= 1914–15 Huddersfield Town A.F.C. season =

Huddersfield Town
1914–15 season
- Chairman: William Hardcastle
- Manager: Arthur Fairclough
- Stadium: Leeds Road
- Football League Second Division: 8th
- FA Cup: First round (eliminated by Burnley)
- Top goalscorer: League: Ralph Shields (16); All: Ralph Shields (16)
- Highest home attendance: 14,000 vs Leeds City (7 November 1914)
- Lowest home attendance: 3,500 vs Nottingham Forest (12 September 1914)
- Biggest win: 5–0 vs Blackpool (26 December 1914)
- Biggest defeat: 1–4 vs Wolverhampton Wanderers (13 February 1915)
Home colours

Huddersfield Town's 1914–15 campaign was the last league campaign before the Football League was suspended following the outbreak of World War I. Town finished in 8th place in Division 2, but it could have improved had Town not had a bad spell at the start of 1915, saw Town lose 6 out of 7 matches, which if Town had won all of them, they would have won promotion.

== Squad at the start of the season ==
Note: Flags indicate national team as defined under FIFA eligibility rules; some limited exceptions apply. Players may hold more than one non-FIFA nationality.

Pos.	Nation	Player
GK	ENG	Ted Davis
GK	SCO	Sandy Mutch
DF	ENG	Jim Baker
DF	ENG	Harry Brough
DF	ENG	Fred Bullock
DF	ENG	James Dow
DF	ENG	Fred Fayers
DF	ENG	Sidney James
DF	ENG	Harry Linley
DF	SCO	William McLaren
DF	ENG	Ralph Rodgerson
DF	ENG	Charlie Slade

Pos.	Nation	Player
DF	ENG	Billy Watson
MF	ENG	John Connor
MF	ENG	Joe Jee
MF	ENG	George Richardson
MF	ENG	Billy Smith
FW	ENG	Jack Cock
FW	ENG	Thomas Elliott
FW	ENG	Ernie Islip
FW	ENG	Frank Mann
FW	ENG	Ralph Shields
FW	ENG	Bert Smith

== Review ==
Despite the outbreak of World War I, the Football League continued for the season to sustain the morale of the country. However, in early November, Larrett Roebuck was killed in action in France. Town's form was good enough at the start of the season to give them a chance at getting into Division 1. However, just after the turn of the year, Town's form dropped alarmingly and they lost their chance to get promoted and finished 8th with 42 points.

== Squad at the end of the season ==
Note: Flags indicate national team as defined under FIFA eligibility rules; some limited exceptions apply. Players may hold more than one non-FIFA nationality.

Pos.	Nation	Player
GK	ENG	Ted Davis
GK	SCO	Sandy Mutch
DF	ENG	Jim Baker
DF	ENG	Harry Brough
DF	ENG	Fred Bullock
DF	ENG	James Dow
DF	ENG	Fred Fayers
DF	ENG	Sidney James
DF	ENG	Harry Linley
DF	SCO	William McLaren
DF	SCO	Bob Reid
DF	ENG	Ralph Rodgerson
DF	ENG	Charlie Slade

Pos.	Nation	Player
DF	ENG	Billy Watson
DF	ENG	James Wood
MF	ENG	John Connor
MF	ENG	Joe Jee
MF	ENG	George Richardson
MF	ENG	Billy Smith
FW	ENG	Jack Cock
FW	ENG	Thomas Elliott
FW	ENG	Ernie Islip
FW	ENG	Frank Mann
FW	ENG	Ralph Shields
FW	ENG	Bert Smith

== Results ==
=== Division Two ===
Date	Opponents	Home/ Away	Result F - A	Scorers	Attendance	Position
5 September 1914	Preston North End	A	1 - 1	Islip	10,000	14th
8 September 1914	Bury	H	0 - 1		4,000	16th
12 September 1914	Nottingham Forest	H	4 - 0	Billy Smith (2), Islip, Jee	3,500	10th
19 September 1914	Leicester Fosse	A	2 - 1	Slade, Jee	7,000	9th
21 September 1914	Leicester Fosse	H	3 - 1	Shields (2), Slade	6,000	3rd
26 September 1914	Barnsley	H	1 - 0	Shields	7,000	2nd
3 October 1914	Glossop	A	2 - 2	Islip, Shields	1,650	2nd
10 October 1914	Wolverhampton Wanderers	H	2 - 0	Billy Smith, Islip	8,500	2nd
17 October 1914	Fulham	A	3 - 2	Shields (2, 1 pen), Islip	10,000	2nd
24 October 1914	Stockport County	H	2 - 1	Mann, Islip	8,500	1st
31 October 1914	Hull City	H	1 - 0	Shields (pen)	7,000	1st
7 November 1914	Leeds City	H	1 - 0	Shields	14,000	1st
14 November 1914	Clapton Orient	A	1 - 3	Slade	8,000	1st
21 November 1914	Arsenal	H	3 - 0	Shields (2), Islip	10,246	1st
28 November 1914	Derby County	A	0 - 1		7,000	1st
5 December 1914	Lincoln City	H	0 - 1		4,000	2nd
12 December 1914	Birmingham	A	0 - 1		9,000	2nd
19 December 1914	Grimsby Town	H	3 - 1	Islip, Cock, Arrowsmith (og)	3,500	2nd
26 December 1914	Blackpool	H	5 - 0	Islip (3), Fayers, Shields	9,500	2nd
1 January 1915	Bury	A	1 - 3	Mann	?	3rd
2 January 1915	Preston North End	H	3 - 1	Shields (pen), Mann, Fayers	7,500	3rd
16 January 1915	Nottingham Forest	A	2 - 3	Islip, Slade	3,500	4th
30 January 1915	Barnsley	A	0 - 1		6,700	4th
6 February 1915	Glossop	H	0 - 1		4,500	4th
13 February 1915	Wolverhampton Wanderers	A	1 - 4	Billy Smith	3,000	6th
20 February 1915	Fulham	H	2 - 2	Islip, Linley	6,000	6th
27 February 1915	Stockport County	A	1 - 2	Shields	5,000	6th
13 March 1915	Leeds City	A	0 - 1		12,000	9th
20 March 1915	Clapton Orient	H	1 - 1	Mann (pen)	4,000	12th
27 March 1915	Arsenal	A	3 - 0	Mann (2), Cock	14,000	11th
2 April 1915	Blackpool	A	2 - 3	Jee, Islip	4,000	11th
3 April 1915	Derby County	H	0 - 0		6,500	12th
5 April 1915	Bristol City	A	1 - 0	Mann	12,000	9th
6 April 1915	Bristol City	H	5 - 3	Shields (3), Jee (pen), Richardson	4,000	7th
10 April 1915	Lincoln City	A	1 - 1	Jee	4,500	8th
15 April 1915	Hull City	A	4 - 0	Bert Smith (3), Cock	2,000	7th
17 April 1915	Birmingham	H	0 - 0		4,000	7th
24 April 1915	Grimsby Town	A	0 - 0		3,500	7th

=== FA Cup ===
Date	Round	Opponents	Home/ Away	Result F - A	Scorers	Attendance
9 January 1915	Round 1	Burnley	A	1 - 3	Fayers	14,423

== Appearances and goals ==
Name	Nationality	Position	League		FA Cup		Total	
Name	Nationality	Position	Apps	Goals	Apps	Goals	Apps	Goals
Jim Baker	England	DF	37	0	1	0	38	0
Fred Bullock	England	DF	28	0	1	0	29	0
Jack Cock	England	FW	9	3	0	0	9	3
John Connor	England	MF	3	0	0	0	3	0
Ted Davis	England	GK	10	0	0	0	10	0
James Dow	England	DF	6	0	0	0	6	0
Thomas Elliott	England	FW	10	0	0	0	10	0
Fred Fayers	England	DF	38	3	1	1	39	4
Ernie Islip	England	FW	33	14	1	0	34	14
Sidney James	England	DF	3	0	0	0	3	0
Joe Jee	England	MF	25	5	0	0	25	5
Harry Linley	England	DF	22	1	1	0	23	1
Frank Mann	England	FW	22	7	1	0	23	7
William McLaren	Scotland	DF	13	0	0	0	13	0
Sandy Mutch	Scotland	GK	28	0	1	0	29	0
Bob Reid	Scotland	DF	26	0	1	0	27	0
George Richardson	England	MF	12	1	0	0	12	1
Ralph Rodgerson	England	DF	1	0	0	0	1	0
Ralph Shields	England	FW	28	16	1	0	29	16
Charlie Slade	England	DF	22	4	1	0	23	4
Bert Smith	England	FW	2	3	0	0	2	3
Billy Smith	England	MF	24	4	1	0	25	4
Billy Watson	England	DF	5	0	0	0	5	0
James Wood	England	DF	11	0	0	0	11	0
