= 1920–21 Huddersfield Town A.F.C. season =

Huddersfield Town
1920–21 season
- Chairman: William Hardcastle; Joseph Barlow
- Manager: Ambrose Langley (until 23 March 1921); Herbert Chapman (from 31 March 1921)
- Stadium: Leeds Road
- Football League First Division: 17th
- FA Cup: Third round
- Top goalscorer: League: Jack Swann (8); All: Jack Swann (8)
- Highest home attendance: 33,862 vs Sheffield United (29 March 1921)
- Lowest home attendance: 14,000 vs Oldham Athletic (2 May 1921)
- Biggest win: 5–1 vs West Bromwich Albion (23 October 1920)
- Biggest defeat: 0–4 vs Arsenal (20 November 1920)
Home colours

Huddersfield Town's 1920–21 campaign was Town's first season in the Football League First Division. It was more a baptism of fire than a season of success. They finished in 17th place, after scoring only 42 goals in the league and no player getting into double figures.

One notable thing from this season was the appointment of Herbert Chapman as manager in March, as his vision would lead Town to great success in the rest of the decade.

== Squad at the start of the season ==
Note: Flags indicate national team as defined under FIFA eligibility rules; some limited exceptions apply. Players may hold more than one non-FIFA nationality.

Pos.	Nation	Player
GK	ENG	Ted Davis
GK	SCO	Sandy Mutch
DF	ENG	Harry Brough
DF	ENG	Fred Bullock
DF	SCO	Jimmy Campbell
DF	ENG	Harry Linley
DF	SCO	Colin McKay
DF	ENG	Ralph Rodgerson
DF	ENG	Charlie Slade
DF	ENG	Billy Watson
DF	ENG	Tom Wilson

Pos.	Nation	Player
DF	ENG	James Wood
MF	ENG	George Richardson
MF	ENG	Billy Smith
FW	ENG	Ernie Islip
FW	ENG	Fred Lunn
FW	ENG	Frank Mann
FW	ENG	Ralph Shields
FW	ENG	Billy E. Smith
FW	ENG	Jack Swann
FW	ENG	Sammy Taylor

== Review ==
After the previous season's successes in both Division 2 and FA Cup, many were wondering how Ambrose Langley's team would get on in the top-flight. After winning 5 of their first 6 games, Town were in line for a possible chance at the title, however the next 26 league games would only produce 3 more wins, which saw Town in the middle of a relegation battle.

Earlier in the season, a Mr. Herbert Chapman was brought in as the new club secretary and at the end of March, he replaced Langley as manager and in 4 of his 7 games, Town recorded the necessary wins which pulled Town out of any danger of relegation.

== Squad at the end of the season ==
Note: Flags indicate national team as defined under FIFA eligibility rules; some limited exceptions apply. Players may hold more than one non-FIFA nationality.

Pos.	Nation	Player
GK	ENG	Ted Davis
GK	SCO	Sandy Mutch
DF	ENG	Frederick Brock
DF	ENG	Harry Brough
DF	ENG	Fred Bullock
DF	ENG	Harry Linley
DF	SCO	Colin McKay
DF	ENG	Charlie Slade
DF	ENG	Sam Wadsworth
DF	ENG	Billy Watson
DF	ENG	Tom Wilson

Pos.	Nation	Player
DF	ENG	James Wood
MF	SCO	Billy Johnston
MF	ENG	George Richardson
MF	ENG	Billy Smith
FW	ENG	Ernie Islip
FW	ENG	Fred Lunn
FW	ENG	Frank Mann
FW	ENG	Billy E. Smith
FW	ENG	Clem Stephenson
FW	ENG	Jack Swann
FW	ENG	William Wright

== Results ==
=== Division One ===
Date	Opponents	Home/ Away	Result F – A	Scorers	Attendance	Position
28 August 1920	Preston North End	A	1–0	Taylor	28,000	1st
30 August 1920	Burnley	H	1–0	B. Smith	22,500	1st
4 September 1920	Preston North End	H	1–0	Mann (pen)	18,000	1st
6 September 1920	Burnley	A	0–3		30,000	3rd
11 September 1920	Bradford City	H	1–0	Lunn	27,500	2nd
18 September 1920	Bradford City	A	2–0	Lunn, Islip	25,000	1st
25 September 1920	Sunderland	H	0–0		31,000	3rd
2 October 1920	Sunderland	A	1–2	Taylor	45,000	6th
9 October 1920	Everton	H	0–1		26,500	6th
16 October 1920	Everton	A	0–0		50,000	8th
23 October 1920	West Bromwich Albion	H	5–1	Taylor, Mann (pen), Shields (2), Islip	24,020	5th
30 October 1920	West Bromwich Albion	A	0–3		44,049	7th
6 November 1920	Manchester City	H	0–1		26,400	8th
13 November 1920	Manchester City	A	2–3	Islip, Watson	30,000	13th
20 November 1920	Arsenal	H	0–4		19,000	16th
27 November 1920	Arsenal	A	0–2		35,000	17th
4 December 1920	Bolton Wanderers	H	0–0		14,500	15th
11 December 1920	Bolton Wanderers	A	1–3	Taylor	27,500	17th
18 December 1920	Derby County	H	2–0	Wright, Swann	15,000	17th
25 December 1920	Middlesbrough	A	0–2		35,000	18th
27 December 1920	Middlesbrough	H	0–1		32,430	18th
29 December 1920	Sheffield United	A	1–1	Sturgess (og)	37,500	18th
1 January 1921	Derby County	A	1–2	Wright	12,000	18th
15 January 1921	Bradford (Park Avenue)	A	1–1	Wright	20,000	18th
22 January 1921	Bradford (Park Avenue)	H	0–0		20,700	18th
5 February 1921	Blackburn Rovers	H	0–0		19,800	18th
10 February 1921	Blackburn Rovers	A	2–1	B. Smith, Islip	25,000	18th
12 February 1921	Newcastle United	A	0–1		46,500	18th
23 February 1921	Newcastle United	H	1–3	Johnston	30,000	18th
26 February 1921	Liverpool	A	1–4	Wright	35,000	18th
5 March 1921	Liverpool	H	1–2	Johnston	18,000	18th
12 March 1921	Aston Villa	A	0–0		20,000	18th
19 March 1921	Aston Villa	H	1–0	Swann	25,000	17th
26 March 1921	Manchester United	H	5–2	Swann (2), Stephenson, Wilson, Mann	20,468	18th
29 March 1921	Sheffield United	H	1–0	Mann	33,862	18th
2 April 1921	Manchester United	A	0–2		30,000	18th
9 April 1921	Chelsea	H	2–0	Johnston, Mann	14,200	18th
16 April 1921	Chelsea	A	1–1	Islip	37,500	18th
25 April 1921	Tottenham Hotspur	H	2–0	Swann (2)	28,000	18th
30 April 1921	Tottenham Hotspur	A	0–1		32,500	18th
2 May 1921	Oldham Athletic	H	3–1	Johnston, Mann, Swann	14,000	18th
7 May 1921	Oldham Athletic	A	2–1	Swann, B. Smith	12,029	17th

=== FA Cup ===
Date	Round	Opponents	Home/ Away	Result F – A	Scorers	Attendance
8 January 1921	Round 1	Brentford	A	2–1	Islip, Wright	14,439
29 January 1921	Round 2	Bradford Park Avenue	A	1–0	Mann	30,303
19 February 1921	Round 3	Aston Villa	A	0–2		60,627

== Appearances and goals ==
Name	Nationality	Position	League		FA Cup		Total	
Name	Nationality	Position	Apps	Goals	Apps	Goals	Apps	Goals
Frederick Brock	England	DF	1	0	0	0	1	0
Harry Brough	England	DF	19	0	0	0	19	0
Fred Bullock	England	DF	25	0	3	0	28	0
Jimmy Campbell	Scotland	DF	1	0	0	0	1	0
Ted Davis	England	GK	1	0	0	0	1	0
Ernie Islip	England	FW	24	5	3	1	27	6
Billy Johnston	Scotland	FW	14	4	0	0	14	4
Harry Linley	England	DF	3	0	0	0	3	0
Fred Lunn	England	FW	6	2	0	0	6	2
Frank Mann	England	FW	33	6	3	1	36	7
Colin McKay	Scotland	DF	4	0	0	0	4	0
Sandy Mutch	Scotland	GK	41	0	3	0	44	0
George Richardson	England	MF	27	0	3	0	30	0
Ralph Rodgerson	England	DF	14	0	1	0	15	0
Ralph Shields	England	FW	4	2	0	0	4	2
Charlie Slade	England	DF	34	0	3	0	37	0
Billy E. Smith	England	FW	2	0	0	0	2	0
Billy H. Smith	England	MF	33	3	2	0	35	3
Clem Stephenson	England	FW	9	1	0	0	9	1
Jack Swann	England	FW	26	8	1	0	27	8
Sammy Taylor	England	FW	19	4	0	0	19	4
Sam Wadsworth	England	DF	6	0	0	0	6	0
Billy Watson	England	DF	31	0	3	0	34	0
Tom Wilson	England	DF	42	2	3	0	45	2
James Wood	England	DF	34	0	2	0	36	0
William Wright	England	FW	9	4	3	1	12	5
