= 1919–20 Huddersfield Town A.F.C. season =

Huddersfield Town
1919–20 season
- Chairman: William Hardcastle
- Manager: Arthur Fairclough (until 23 December 1919); Ambrose Langley (from 23 December 1919)
- Stadium: Leeds Road
- Football League Second Division: 2nd (promoted)
- FA Cup: Runners-Up (eliminated by Aston Villa)
- Top goalscorer: League: Sammy Taylor (35); All: Sammy Taylor (41)
- Highest home attendance: 47,527 vs Liverpool (6 March 1920)
- Lowest home attendance: 3,000 vs Fulham (1 November 1919)
- Biggest win: 7–1 vs Rotherham County (25 December 1919)
- Biggest defeat: 0–2 vs Bury (1 September 1919); 2–4 vs Birmingham (27 September 1919); 0–2 vs Blackpool (6 December 1919); 0–2 vs Tottenham Hotspur (16 February 1920)
Home colours

Huddersfield Town's 1919–20 season was one of the most memorable season in Town's entire history. It could even have been their last, after just 12 years. This was mainly because of plans to amalgamate the club with the new Leeds United team. However, Town's fan bought shares in the team, which saw the team survive and then gain promotion to the top-flight, as well as an appearance in the FA Cup Final against Aston Villa.

== Squad at the start of the season ==
Note: Flags indicate national team as defined under FIFA eligibility rules; some limited exceptions apply. Players may hold more than one non-FIFA nationality.

Pos.	Nation	Player
GK	ENG	Ted Davis
GK	SCO	Sandy Mutch
DF	ENG	Jim Baker
DF	ENG	Harry Brough
DF	ENG	Fred Bullock
DF	ENG	Harry Linley
DF	ENG	Ralph Rodgerson
DF	ENG	Charlie Slade
DF	ENG	Billy Watson
DF	ENG	Tom Wilson

Pos.	Nation	Player
DF	ENG	James Wood
MF	ENG	George Richardson
MF	ENG	Billy Smith
FW	ENG	Jack Cock
FW	ENG	Thomas Elliott
FW	ENG	Ernie Islip
FW	ENG	Frank Mann
FW	ENG	Ralph Shields
FW	ENG	Jack Swann
FW	ENG	Sammy Taylor

== Review ==
After the end of World War I, the league schedule was returned to its normal status with Town still in Division 2. However, people were starting to wonder what the future would hold for the club after the club's first England international Jack Cock was sold to Chelsea. Then it was revealed that the club was to amalgamate with the new Leeds United team, formed following the demise of Leeds City. But, the people of Huddersfield rallied round and bought £30,000 worth of shares, which saw the club survive for the time being.

Following the club's rescue, the team's form dramatically improved and Town were fighting for an automatic promotion place. This was primarily achieved thanks to a run of losing only 1 out of their last 25 matches. That got them a finishing position of 2nd place behind Tottenham Hotspur.

The season is also noted for the club's first FA Cup Final, reached after beating Brentford, Newcastle United, Plymouth Argyle, Liverpool and Bristol City, before playing Aston Villa in the final at Stamford Bridge, before losing to Billy Kirton's goal in extra time.

== Squad at the end of the season ==
Note: Flags indicate national team as defined under FIFA eligibility rules; some limited exceptions apply. Players may hold more than one non-FIFA nationality.

Pos.	Nation	Player
GK	ENG	Ted Davis
GK	SCO	Sandy Mutch
DF	ENG	Jim Baker
DF	ENG	Harry Brough
DF	ENG	Fred Bullock
DF	ENG	Rennie Harrison
DF	ENG	Harry Linley
DF	ENG	Ralph Rodgerson
DF	ENG	Charlie Slade
DF	ENG	Billy Watson

Pos.	Nation	Player
DF	ENG	Tom Wilson
DF	ENG	James Wood
MF	ENG	George Richardson
MF	ENG	Billy Smith
MF	ENG	Percy Tompkin
FW	ENG	Ernie Islip
FW	ENG	Frank Mann
FW	ENG	Ralph Shields
FW	ENG	Jack Swann
FW	ENG	Sammy Taylor

== Results ==
=== Division Two ===
Date	Opponents	Home/ Away	Result F – A	Scorers	Attendance	Position
30 August 1919	Clapton Orient	H	2–1	Cock, Baker	5,000	8th
1 September 1919	Bury	A	0–2		4,000	13th
6 September 1919	Clapton Orient	A	1–0	Taylor	10,000	8th
9 September 1919	Bury	H	5–0	Cock (4), Mann	4,000	5th
13 September 1919	Grimsby Town	A	0–1		5,000	9th
20 September 1919	Grimsby Town	H	3–0	Baker (2, 1 pen), Mann	4,000	4th
27 September 1919	Birmingham	A	2–4	Shields, Cock	16,000	9th
4 October 1919	Birmingham	H	0–0		6,000	10th
11 October 1919	Leicester City	A	4–0	Taylor (2), Mann, Shields	12,000	6th
18 October 1919	Leicester City	H	0–0		4,000	9th
25 October 1919	Fulham	A	2–2	Chaplin (og), Taylor	18,000	10th
1 November 1919	Fulham	H	3–0	Taylor (2), Mann	3,000	8th
8 November 1919	Coventry City	A	2–0	Mann (pen), Taylor	15,000	5th
15 November 1919	Coventry City	H	5–0	Taylor (2), Swann (2), Roberts (og)	5,000	5th
22 November 1919	Bristol City	H	1–0	Smith	7,897	4th
29 November 1919	Bristol City	A	1–2	Shields	10,000	6th
6 December 1919	Blackpool	H	1–3	Taylor	6,500	6th
13 December 1919	Blackpool	A	3–0	Smith (2), Richardson	5,000	5th
20 December 1919	West Ham United	H	2–0	Swann, Smith	7,000	4th
25 December 1919	Rotherham County	H	7–1	Swann (3), Mann (3), Smith	26,000	4th
26 December 1919	Rotherham County	A	3–1	Swann, Taylor (2)	10,000	2nd
27 December 1919	West Ham United	A	1–1	Taylor	20,000	3rd
31 December 1919	Lincoln City	A	3–1	Mann, Taylor, Swann	3,000	2nd
3 January 1920	Port Vale	H	4–1	Taylor, Swann (3)	8,000	2nd
24 January 1920	Tottenham Hotspur	H	1–1	Mann	27,000	2nd
7 February 1920	South Shields	H	2–2	Smith, Swann	12,700	2nd
14 February 1920	South Shields	A	2–1	Taylor, Richardson	12,070	3rd
16 February 1920	Tottenham Hotspur	A	0–2		18,000	3rd
28 February 1920	Wolverhampton Wanderers	A	3–2	Mann, Smith, Richardson	12,000	3rd
13 March 1920	Hull City	H	2–0	Taylor (2)	8,048	3rd
18 March 1920	Hull City	A	4–1	Taylor (3), Swann	12,000	3rd
20 March 1920	Stockport County	A	2–1	Taylor (2)	15,000	2nd
29 March 1920	Port Vale	A	0–0		10,000	2nd
3 April 1920	Barnsley	A	3–3	Mann, Taylor (2)	21,359	2nd
5 April 1920	Stoke	A	1–0	Taylor	20,000	2nd
6 April 1920	Stoke	H	3–0	Taylor (2), Mann	28,000	2nd
10 April 1920	Barnsley	H	4–1	T.J. Tindall (og), Taylor, Swann (2)	10,000	2nd
12 April 1920	Stockport County	H	5–1	Mann (2), Taylor (3)	12,700	2nd
14 April 1920	Wolverhampton Wanderers	H	2–0	Swann, Taylor	14,000	2nd
17 April 1920	Nottingham Forest	A	2–1	Mann, Taylor	20,000	2nd
26 April 1920	Nottingham Forest	H	2–1	Swann (2)	11,500	2nd
1 May 1920	Lincoln City	H	4–2	Taylor, Richardson, Swann, Mann	12,000	2nd

=== FA Cup ===
Date	Round	Opponents	Home/ Away	Result F – A	Scorers	Attendance
10 January 1920	Round 1	Brentford	H	5–1	Smith, Taylor (2), Swann, Shields	10,670
31 January 1920	Round 2	Newcastle United	A	1–0	Mann	46,462
21 February 1920	Round 3	Plymouth Argyle	H	3–1	Taylor, Slade, Swann	35,000
6 March 1920	Round 4	Liverpool	H	2–1	Swann, Taylor	47,527
27 March 1920	Semi-Final	Bristol City	N	2–1	Taylor (2)	35,463
24 April 1920	Final	Aston Villa	N	0–1 (aet: 90 mins: 0–0)		50,018

== Appearances and goals ==
Name	Nationality	Position	League		FA Cup		Total	
Name	Nationality	Position	Apps	Goals	Apps	Goals	Apps	Goals
Jim Baker	England	DF	19	3	0	0	19	3
Harry Brough	England	DF	18	0	0	0	18	0
Fred Bullock	England	DF	33	0	6	0	39	0
Jack Cock	England	FW	9	6	0	0	9	6
Ted Davis	England	GK	6	0	0	0	6	0
Thomas Elliott	England	FW	1	0	0	0	1	0
Rennie Harrison	England	DF	1	0	0	0	1	0
Ernie Islip	England	FW	3	0	1	0	4	0
Harry Linley	England	DF	5	0	0	0	5	0
Frank Mann	England	FW	37	17	6	1	43	18
Sandy Mutch	Scotland	GK	35	0	6	0	41	0
George Richardson	England	MF	34	4	6	0	40	4
Ralph Rodgerson	England	DF	11	0	0	0	11	0
Ralph Shields	England	FW	13	3	1	1	14	4
Charlie Slade	England	DF	17	0	5	1	22	1
Billy Smith	England	MF	39	7	5	1	44	8
Jack Swann	England	FW	32	19	6	3	38	22
Sammy Taylor	England	FW	42	35	6	6	48	41
Percy Tompkin	England	MF	1	0	0	0	1	0
Billy Watson	England	DF	41	0	6	0	47	0
Tom Wilson	England	DF	26	0	6	0	32	0
James Wood	England	DF	39	0	6	0	45	0
