= 1922 FA Cup final =

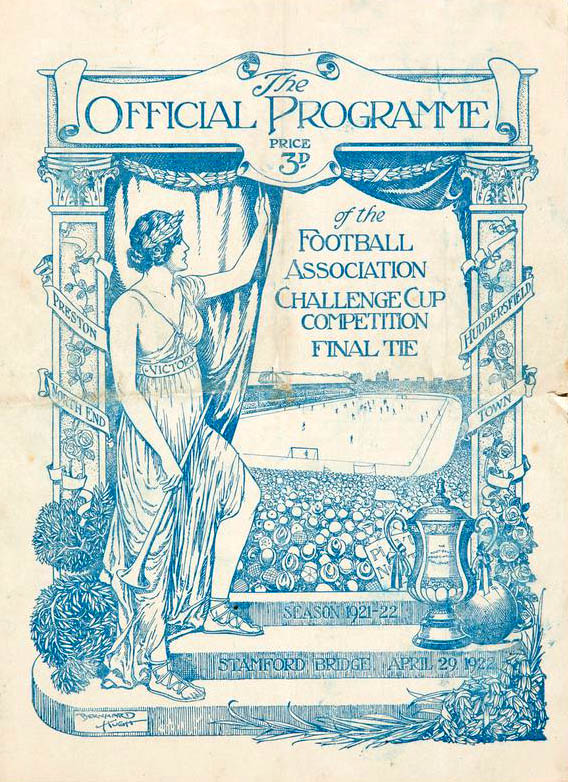
- Official programme
- Event: 1921–22 FA Cup
Huddersfield Town	Preston North End
1	0
- Date: 29 April 1922
- Venue: Stamford Bridge, London
- Referee: John W. D. Fowler (Sunderland)
- Attendance: 53,000

The 1922 FA Cup final was the deciding match of the 1921–22 FA Cup competition, contested by Huddersfield Town and Preston North End at Stamford Bridge on 29 April 1922. It was the last final before the opening of the Empire Stadium at Wembley the following year, and the guest of honour was the Duke of York.

The five teams that Huddersfield had eliminated to reach the final included Burnley, who were the League champions from the previous season, while Preston's opponents had included both Wolverhampton Wanderers and Tottenham Hotspur, who had contested the previous season's Cup final. Huddersfield were playing in their second FA Cup final in three seasons, having lost to Aston Villa in 1920, and Preston were playing in their first final for 33 years.

Huddersfield won by a single goal, a contentious penalty scored by Billy Smith in the second half, after Smith was brought down by the Preston defender Tom Hamilton. The match was strongly criticised by contemporary journalists and the Football Association because of the poor standard of play and the excessive number of deliberate fouls. It was Huddersfield's first major trophy under the management of Herbert Chapman. This remains the only time they have won the Cup, although they have appeared in three subsequent finals, including the 1938 final when they lost to Preston by the same score.

== Route to the final ==
=== Huddersfield Town ===
Round	Opposition	Score	Venue
1st	Burnley	2–2	Turf Moor (a)
1st (replay)	Burnley	3–2	Leeds Road (h)
2nd	Brighton & Hove Albion	0–0	Goldstone Ground (a)
2nd (replay)	Brighton & Hove Albion	2–0	Leeds Road (h)
3rd	Blackburn Rovers	1–1	Ewood Park (a)
3rd (replay)	Blackburn Rovers	5–0	Leeds Road (h)
Quarter-final	Millwall	3–0	Leeds Road (h)
Semi-final	Notts County	3–1	Turf Moor (n)

In the first round, Huddersfield were drawn away to the reigning League champions Burnley, who were unbeaten at home in League and Cup since August 1920. After falling two goals down, Huddersfield rallied to draw 2–2 after a late equaliser from Billy Watson, and then won the replay 3–2 in heavy rain, with Clem Stephenson scoring the winning goal. In the second round, they drew an uneventful match away to Brighton & Hove Albion of the newly-formed Third Division South, and won the replay 2–0 at home with second-half goals from Stephenson and George Richardson.

In the third round they were drawn away for the third time in a row, and again required a replay after a 1–1 with First Division Blackburn Rovers, although Huddersfield had two goals disallowed in the second half. Huddersfield won the replay convincingly, 5–0, with Frank Mann, Ernie Islip and Billy Smith scoring in the first half, and Smith and Islip adding further goals in the second.

Huddersfield received a favourable home draw against another Third Division South team, Millwall, in the quarter-finals, which they won 3–0 with two first-half goals by Stephenson and one in the second half by Islip, before returning to Turf Moor to play the only Cup semi-final ever to be held at Burnley's home stadium. Their opponents, in front of a crowd of 46,000, were Second Division Notts County, who were playing the tenth match of their Cup run, having needed replays in each previous round. A mistake by County's goalkeeper Albert Iremonger allowed Mann to open the scoring with a header after two minutes, but Harold Hill equalised before a quarter of an hour had been played. In the second half, goals in quick succession by Smith and Stephenson gave Huddersfield a 3–1 win and a place in the final for the second time in three seasons.

=== Preston North End ===
Round	Opposition	Score	Venue
1st	Wolverhampton Wanderers	3–0	Deepdale (h)
2nd	Newcastle United	3–1	Deepdale (h)
3rd	Barnsley	1–1	Oakwell (a)
3rd (replay)	Barnsley	3–0	Deepdale (h)
Quarter-final	Arsenal	1–1	Highbury (a)
Quarter-final (replay)	Arsenal	2–1	Deepdale (h)
Semi-final	Tottenham Hotspur	2–1	Hillsborough (n)

Preston North End began by beating the finalists from the previous season, Second Division Wolverhampton Wanderers, 3–0 at home with two goals from Tommy Roberts and one from Frank Jefferis. In the second round they conceded an early goal to Newcastle United's Stan Seymour, but recovered strongly to win 3–1. In the third round against the 1912 Cup winners, Barnsley, they required a replay, which they won 3–0 after Barnsley's Jack Tindall was sent off in the first half.

The quarter-finals saw Preston draw 1–1 with Arsenal at Highbury, despite the absence of their captain Joe McCall, in a match played in heavy rain. Jefferis scored after five minutes, but Bert White equalised with a long shot before half-time and Arsenal could not score again despite dominating the second half. On another heavy pitch in the replay, Arsenal went ahead early in the second half when Billy Blyth scored after a corner, but Roberts soon equalised and then he scored the winning goal in extra-time.

In the semi-finals, Preston beat the Cup holders Tottenham Hotspur 2–1 at Hillsborough, reversing the scoreline by which they had lost to the same opponents at the same stage and at the same venue in 1921. Tottenham had a goal by Bert Bliss disallowed but took the lead in the first half when Jimmy Seed scored with an overhead kick. Preston improved in the second half and equalised with a swerving shot by Archibald Rawlings, before Roberts took advantage of a mistake by Bob McDonald to score the winning goal and send Preston to their first final for 33 years.

== Pre-match ==
In 1922, Huddersfield Town was still a relatively young club. It had been founded in 1908 and had only been playing in the Football League since 1910. In 1919, the club had become involved in the fallout of the scandal that led to Leeds City being expelled from the League for making illegal payments to players during wartime. Amid their own financial troubles, Huddersfield's chairman proposed a merger with the newly-formed Leeds United, although ultimately the plan did not materialise. Huddersfield survived to win promotion to the First Division in 1920, and they also reached the FA Cup final that year, where they lost to Aston Villa after extra time. Herbert Chapman, whose lifetime ban in connection with the Leeds City scandal had been overturned, was appointed as Huddersfield's manager in 1921. Huddersfield finished 17th in the First Division in the 1920–21 season and were again beaten in the FA Cup by Aston Villa.

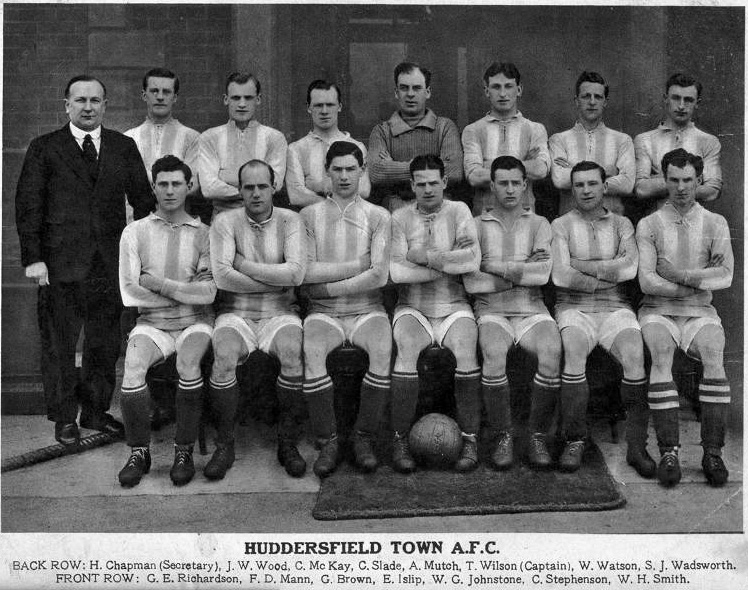
Huddersfield Town in 1922

Eight of Huddersfield's 1922 team had played for them in the final two years earlier, while Clem Stephenson had played for Aston Villa in that match, having previously also won the Cup with Villa in 1913, before signing for Huddersfield during the 1920–21 season. The other newcomers were both England internationals who played in the Home Championship defeat against Scotland on 8 April: Sam Wadsworth, who had been released by Blackburn Rovers after serving with the Royal Garrison Artillery in the First World War, and the outside-left Billy Smith, who had missed the 1920 final through suspension. Wadsworth replaced Fred Bullock, who had captained the 1920 side, at left-back in Huddersfield's team of 1922.

Preston North End were competing in a Preston Guild year, and the final was played in the same month as Tom Finney was born. They had won the Cup once before, in 1889, and had been promoted back to the First Division for the first post-war season having been relegated twice during the previous decade. They finished 16th in the First Division in both 1919–20 and 1920–21, and were also struggling against relegation in 1921–22. Between their semi-final against Tottenham Hotspur on 25 March and the Cup final on 29 April, Preston had endured a remarkable loss of form. They played nine League fixtures in this period and had failed to win any of them, to sink into the lower half of the table with the same number of points as Huddersfield. Huddersfield had also experienced very poor League form during 1922, having been as high as second in the table when they beat Burnley in December 1921.

The teams faced each other at Leeds Road in the League on 22 April, a week before the Cup final. Huddersfield won 6–0, with Smith and Ernie Islip both scoring hat-tricks, although only five of Preston's team in this match went on to play in the Cup final. The previous Saturday, the two teams had drawn 1–1 at Deepdale, so the Cup final was their third meeting in a fortnight. Preston's record away from home in the League was extremely poor: they had failed to win any of their away League fixtures, and had only scored in four of them, while at home they had lost only two League matches.

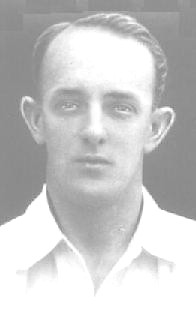
Frank Jefferis, Preston's inside right

In contrast to their opponents, none of Preston's players had played in the FA Cup final before, although their Scottish right-back Tom Hamilton had won the Scottish Cup in 1920 with Kilmarnock. Their 35-year-old captain Joe McCall had won his last international cap in October 1920 as the captain of England, while Archibald Rawlings had a single cap, and the 37-year-old Frank Jefferis, one of the oldest players in Cup final history at that time, was capped twice before the War. Preston's goalkeeper, James Mitchell (also known as Fred), was an eccentric amateur who had played for Great Britain at the 1920 Olympic Games, wore a 'bandeau', or bandana, round his head during matches and was to become the first, and only, player ever to wear spectacles in an FA Cup Final.

For the third year running, the final was to be played at Chelsea's Stamford Bridge stadium, although it had already been decided that in 1923 it would move to the new Empire Stadium at Wembley. The capacity of Stamford Bridge at that time was 85,000, of which 7,500 were seated, but in the two previous finals the stadium had not been full, and the pitch was heavily used and in poor condition. It was the first final to be contested by two First Division teams since 1915, and the third Yorkshire-Lancashire 'Roses' Cup final, after the finals of 1890 and 1907.

== Match ==
The match kicked off at 3pm in warm weather to an attendance of 53,000. Gate receipts were £10,551. Owing to the recent death of Lord Leopold Mountbatten, the King did not attend, so the guest of honour was the Duke of York, accompanied by Prince George. The referee was John W. D. Fowler, who had recovered from serious injuries sustained in the First World War, and the linesmen, D. H. Asson and W. E. Russell, went on to referee the next two FA Cup finals respectively. Both clubs named the same teams that had played in the semi-final. Huddersfield deployed their captain and centre-half, Tom Wilson, in a deeper role than was customary for the 2-3-5 formation conventionally used at the time, to counter the threat of Preston's centre-forward Tommy Roberts.

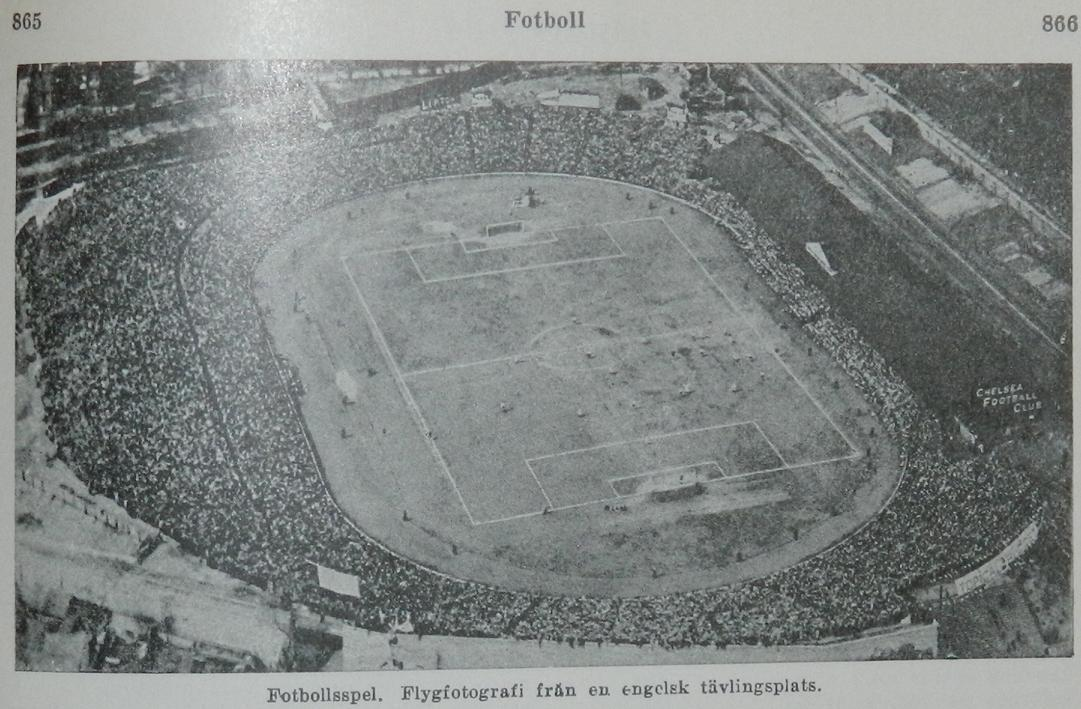
Stamford Bridge in the 1920s

The game quickly degenerated amid a series of fouls by both teams, including "two of the most villainous fouls imaginable" on Roberts and Islip, and there were few goalscoring chances. The first half was goalless, although Preston were denied a goalscoring opportunity when the referee blew for offside against them, only to reverse his decision and restart the game with a drop-ball.

The decisive moment in the match came around halfway through the second half, when Huddersfield's Smith dribbled past Preston's right-back Hamilton, who tripped him from behind. Reporters considered the foul to have taken place outside the penalty area, although Smith fell inside, and despite protests from Preston's players, the referee awarded a penalty to Huddersfield. As Smith prepared to take the kick, Preston's goalkeeper Mitchell tried to distract him by jumping around on the goal-line "like a circus clown" and "with a manoeuvre of dervish leaps", but Smith scored with a shot to the goalkeeper's right.

Huddersfield created a further chance with a move involving several players that ended with a shot by Stephenson, and Stephenson missed with another shot after he had been set up by Smith, but Preston's ineffective forward line were unable to create any chances and the match finished 1–0 to Huddersfield. The Huddersfield team received the trophy from the Duke of York.

=== Match details ===
29 April 1922
15:00 BST

Huddersfield Town	1–0	Preston North End
Smith 67' (pen.)	(Report)

Stamford Bridge, London
Attendance: 53,000
Referee: John W. D. Fowler (Sunderland)

Huddersfield Town
Preston North End

GK	(Scotland) Sandy Mutch
RB	(England) James Wood
LB	(England) Sam Wadsworth
RH	(England) Charlie Slade
CH	(England) Tom Wilson (c)
LH	(England) Billy Watson
OR	(England) George Richardson
IR	(England) Frank Mann
CF	(England) Ernie Islip
IL	(England) Clem Stephenson
OL	(England) Billy Smith
Manager:
(England) Herbert Chapman

GK	(England) James Mitchell
RB	(Scotland) Tom Hamilton
LB	(Scotland) Alex Doolan
RH	(England) Tom Duxbury
CH	(England) Joe McCall (c)
LH	(Scotland) Johnny Williamson
OR	(England) Archibald Rawlings
IR	(England) Frank Jefferis
CF	(England) Tommy Roberts
IL	(England) Roland Woodhouse
OL	(England) Peter Quinn
Manager:
None

== Post-match ==
The 1922 final was widely castigated by contemporary journalists as one of the worst in the competition's history, both for the general quality of the play and for the excessive number of deliberate fouls. The reporter from The Daily Telegraph described the final as "positively bad" and "in every particular the worst I have witnessed". These views are endorsed by subsequent FA Cup historians and football writers. The Sunday Times correspondent was less critical of the amount of foul play and considered Billy Smith to be the match's best performer, but noted the overall paucity of good football and that the match was "so much of a mix-up and a muddle". The Football Association also expressed concern about the conduct of the players during the match. It was the first FA Cup final to be decided by a solitary penalty, and has been described as the last of the three "forgotten finals" that took place between the end of the First World War and the event's move to the Empire Stadium at Wembley, all of which attracted below-capacity crowds and ended in a 1–0 scoreline.

Huddersfield paraded the trophy at St George's Square on the Monday after the final, and beat Middlesbrough and Chelsea in their last two League fixtures to finish 14th. On 10 May, they beat the new League champions Liverpool 1–0 to win the Charity Shield, with a goal by Tom Wilson. Preston recorded their only win away from home all season in their last League match, against Birmingham, and finished 16th.

Huddersfield's defence of their FA Cup ended in the third round the following season with defeat to a Bolton Wanderers team that went on to win the first final at the Empire Stadium in chaotic circumstances. However, Huddersfield's victory in 1922 continued a run under Herbert Chapman that saw them become the most successful team in English football during the 1920s. They became the first team to win the League title three years in succession, between 1923–24 and 1925–26, and were runners-up in the FA Cup in 1928 and 1930 under Wilson's captaincy, although Chapman left for Arsenal in 1925 and Clem Stephenson took over as manager in 1929. Billy Smith played in both of those Cup finals and went on to set a Huddersfield club record of 574 appearances, scoring more than 100 goals. In contrast, Preston continued to struggle in the years after the final, and they were relegated to the Second Division in 1925.

James Mitchell's antics during the penalty incident led to a change in the law, whereby goalkeepers were not allowed to move to distract the kicker before the penalty had been taken. Mitchell moved to Manchester City shortly after the final and won an England cap in 1924. Huddersfield's goalkeeper, Sandy Mutch, was also transferred after the final, and was in the Newcastle United team that reached the 1924 FA Cup final, although he missed the match through injury.

In later years the 1922 final retrospectively gained significance when Huddersfield and Preston met again in the final in 1938, when Preston reversed the scoreline to win 1–0 with another disputed penalty. However, the 1938 FA Cup remains the last time either team has won the competition.
