= 1921–22 Leeds United A.F.C. season =

Leeds United
1921–22 season
- Chairman: Hilton Crowther
- Manager: Arthur Fairclough
- Stadium: Elland Road
- Second Division: 8th
- FA Cup: First round

The 1921–22 season was the third season in the history of Leeds United Association Football Club, a professional football club from Leeds, England. It was the club's second season in the Football League, having been elected into the League ahead of the 1920–21 season from the Midland Football League, to take the place of the disbanded Leeds City Football Club. The club finished 8th in the Football League Second Division out of 20 teams, and also played in the FA Cup, which they were eliminated from in the first round.

== Competitions ==
=== Second Division ===
==== League table ====
Pos	Team	Pld	W	D	L	GF	GA	GAv	Pts
6	South Shields	42	17	12	13	43	38	1.132	46
7	Fulham	42	18	9	15	57	38	1.500	45
8	Leeds United	42	16	13	13	48	38	1.263	45
9	Leicester City	42	14	17	11	39	34	1.147	45
10	The Wednesday	42	15	14	13	47	50	0.940	44

==== Matches ====
Win	Draw	Loss

First Division match results
Date	Opponent	Venue	Result F–A	Scorers	Attendance
27 August 1921	Port Vale	H	2–1	Howarth, Walton	18,000
29 August 1921	Bristol City	A	0–0		16,000
3 September 1921	Port Vale	A	1–0	Howarth	18,000
5 September 1921	Bristol City	H	3–0	Howarth (2), Moore	18,000
10 September 1921	Blackpool	H	0–0		18,000
17 September 1921	Blackpool	A	3–1	Howarth, Wood, Mason	15,000
24 September 1921	Clapton Orient	H	2–0	Wood, Howarth	20,000
1 October 1921	Clapton Orient	A	2–4	Howarth (pen.), Moore	20,000
8 October 1921	South Shields	H	0–0		20,000
15 October 1921	South Shields	A	1–0	Howarth	15,000
22 October 1921	Stoke	H	1–2	Howarth	10,000
29 October 1921	Stoke	A	0–3		15,000
5 November 1921	Bradford Park Avenue	H	3–0	Howarth (pen.), Armitage, Mason	18,000
12 November 1921	Bradford Park Avenue	A	1–0	Howarth	20,000
19 November 1921	Hull City	A	0–1		12,800
26 November 1921	Hull City	H	0–2		20,000
3 December 1921	Notts County	A	1–4	Howarth	12,000
10 December 1921	Notts County	H	1–1	Moore	16,000
17 December 1921	Crystal Palace	H	0–0		10,000
24 December 1921	Crystal Palace	A	2–1	Swan, Moore	10,000
26 December 1921	Sheffield Wednesday	H	1–1	Swan	20,540
27 December 1921	Sheffield Wednesday	A	1–2	Howarth	25,000
31 December 1921	Rotherham County	H	0–2		12,000
14 January 1922	Rotherham County	A	0–1		6,000
21 January 1922	West Ham United	H	0–0		7,000
28 January 1922	West Ham United	A	1–1	Armitage	20,000
4 February 1922	Bury	H	2–0	Armitage, Poyntz	5,000
11 February 1922	Bury	A	1–2	Armitage	10,000
20 February 1922	Leicester City	H	3–0	Poyntz (3)	5,000
25 February 1922	Leicester City	A	0–0		14,000
4 March 1922	Derby County	H	2–1	Swan (2)	12,000
11 March 1922	Derby County	A	0–2		9,000
18 March 1922	Coventry City	A	0–1		15,000
25 March 1922	Coventry City	H	5–2	Armitage (2), Swan (3)	10,000
1 April 1922	Barnsley	A	2–2	Swan, Armitage	12,660
8 April 1922	Barnsley	H	4–0	Swan (2), Gittins (o.g.), Poyntz	10,000
14 April 1922	Fulham	H	2–0	Poyntz, Coates	20,000
15 April 1922	Wolverhampton Wanderers	A	0–0		10,000
17 April 1922	Fulham	A	1–0	Armitage	20,000
22 April 1922	Wolverhampton Wanderers	H	0–0		7,000
29 April 1922	Nottingham Forest	A	0–1		16,000
6 May 1922	Nottingham Forest	H	0–0		10,000

=== FA Cup ===
FA Cup match details
Round	Date	Opponent	Venue	Result F–A	Scorers	Attendance
First round	7 January 1922	Swindon Town	A	1–2	Swan	16,000

== Bibliography ==
- Jarred, Martin; MacDonald, Malcolm (1986). Leeds United: a complete record 1919–1986. Derby: Breedon Books Sport. ISBN 0-907969-17-8. OCLC 14977257.
