= List of Crystal Palace F.C. managers =

The following is a list of managers of Crystal Palace Football Club, from the beginning of the club's official managerial records in 1905 to the present day. Each manager's entry includes the dates of his tenure and the club's overall competitive record (in terms of matches won, drawn and lost).

Edmund Goodman is Crystal Palace's longest serving manager, having taken charge of 613 matches from 1907 to 1925. The club's second-longest serving manager, Steve Coppell, presided over a total of 565 games between 1984 and 2000 across four spells, and in 2005 was voted as the manager for Palace's Centenary XI; he took the club to the 1990 FA Cup final and helped achieve their highest ever league finish of third place in the top-flight, as well as winning the 1990–91 Full Members' Cup and twice achieving promotion from the second tier.

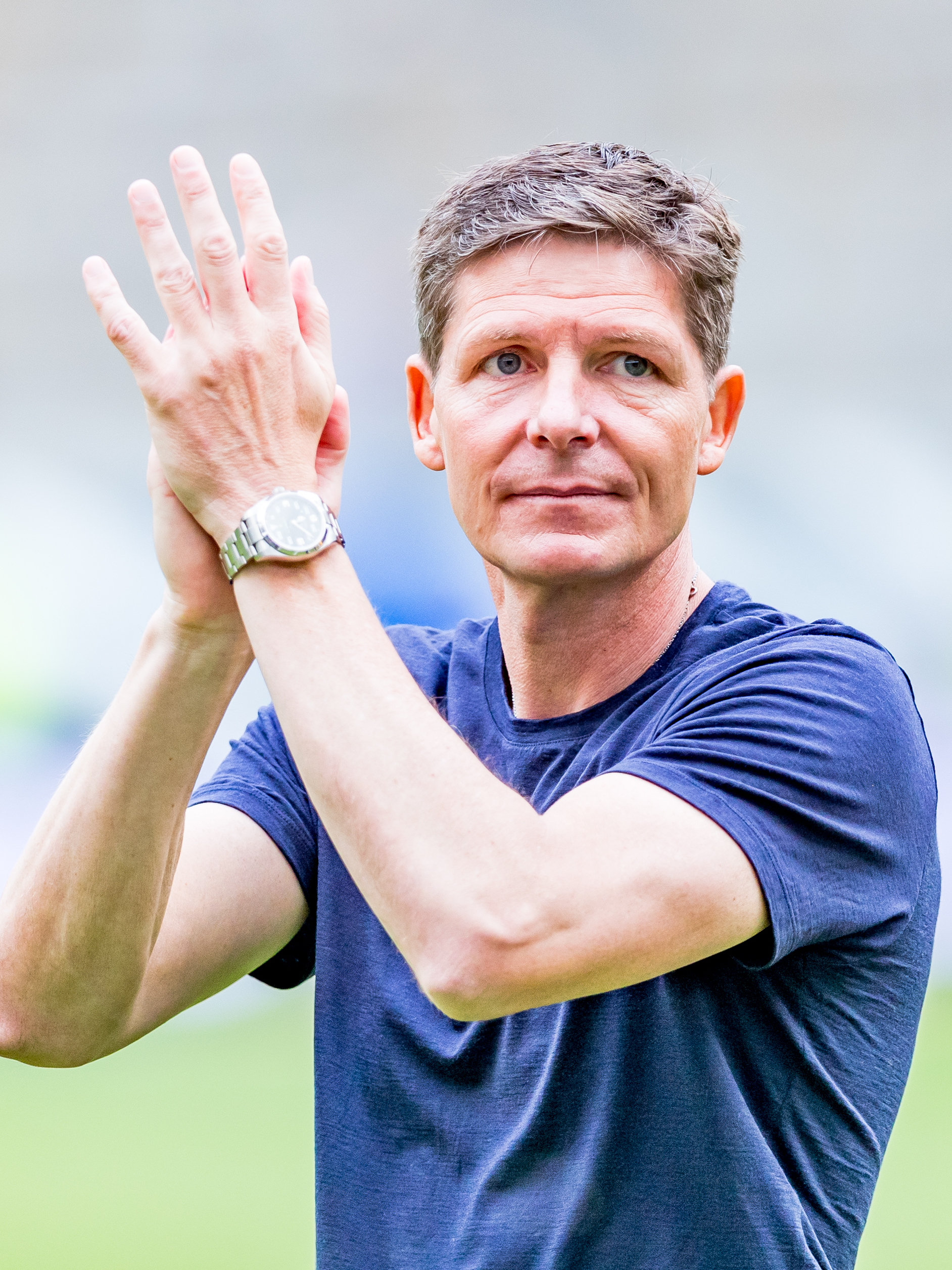
Oliver Glasner is the most successful manager in the club's history

Oliver Glasner was the club's most recent manager, and he led Palace to the 2024–25 FA Cup title, the club's first ever major trophy, as well as ensuring qualification for European competition for the first time, where the club went on to win the 2025–26 UEFA Conference League.

== Key ==
- All first-team matches in national competition are counted, except the abandoned 1939–40 Football League season and matches in wartime leagues and cups
- Names of caretaker managers are supplied where known and marked †
- Names of player-managers are marked ‡
- Win percentage is rounded to two decimal places

== Managers ==
Statistics are complete up to and including the match played 8 November 2026.

Edmund Goodman is Crystal Palace's longest serving manager, taking charge of 613 matches over 18 years.

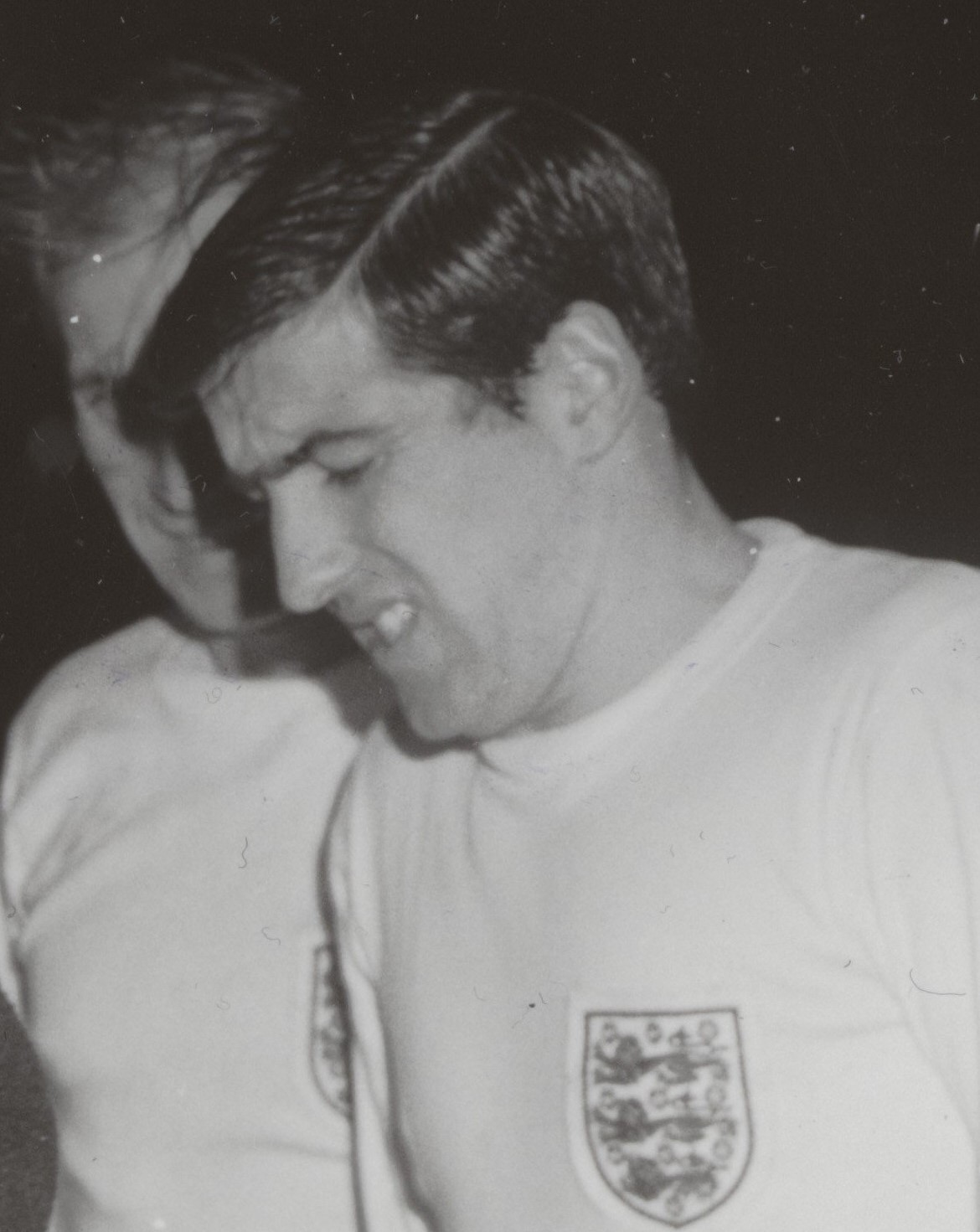
Terry Venables, a former Palace player, was manager between 1976 and 1980, helping the club to promotion out of the Third Division and winning the Second Division, as well as from 1998 to 1999.

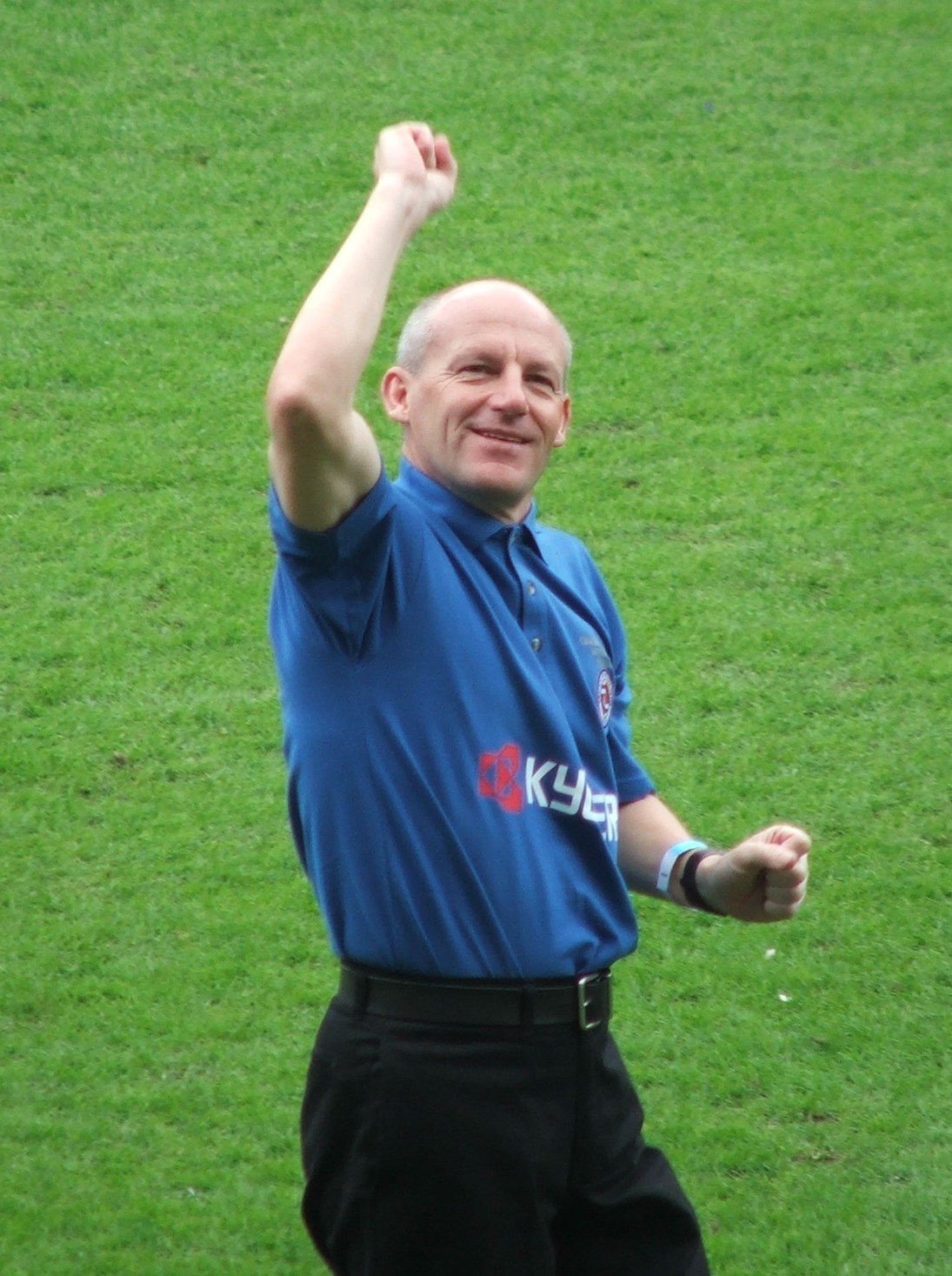
Steve Coppell, in charge across four spells between 1984 and 2000, led the club to two promotions, the 1990 FA Cup final, a highest ever top-flight finish (third) and the 1990–91 Full Members' Cup.

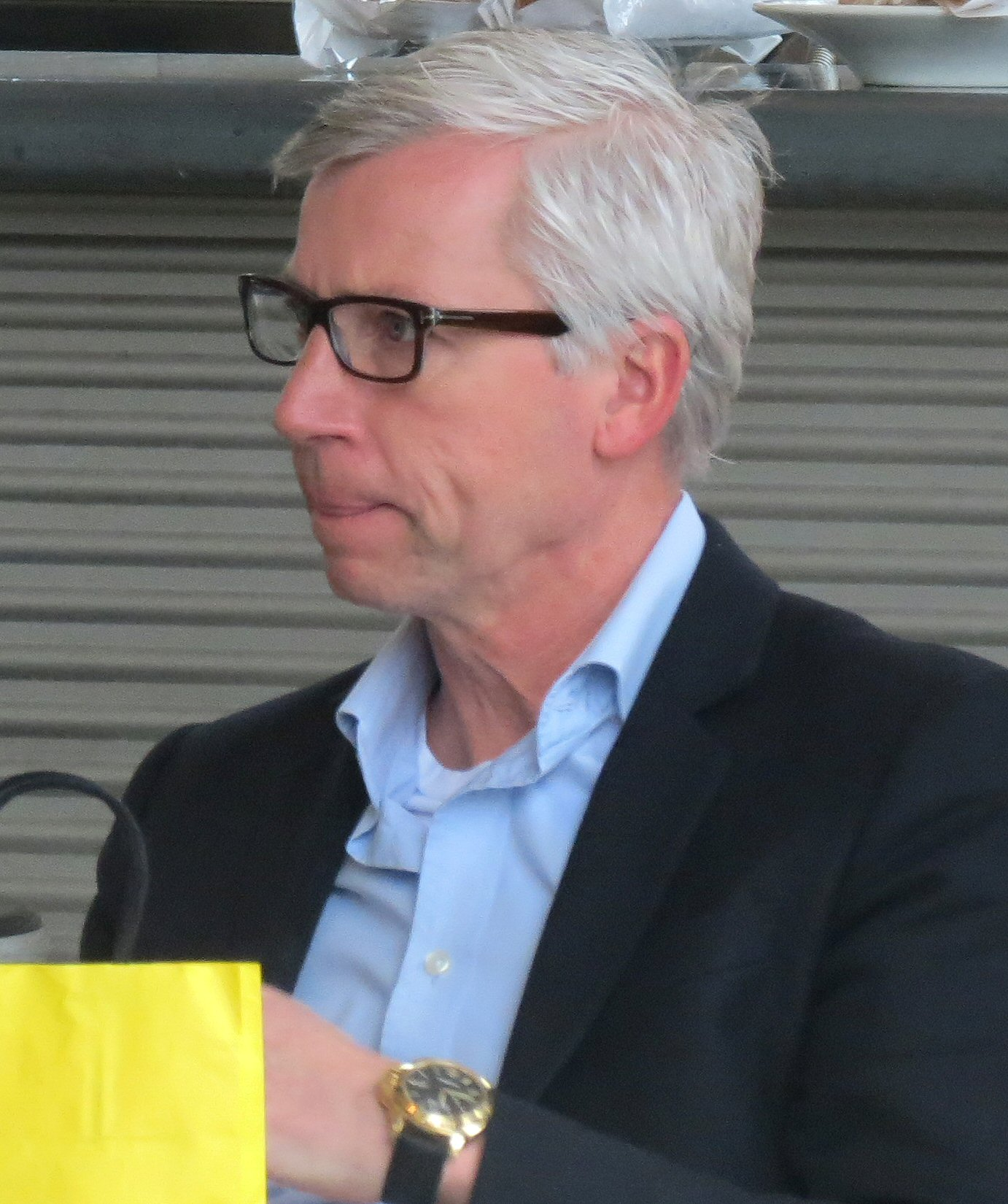
Alan Pardew, a former Palace player, was manager between 2015 and 2016, taking the club to the 2016 FA Cup final.

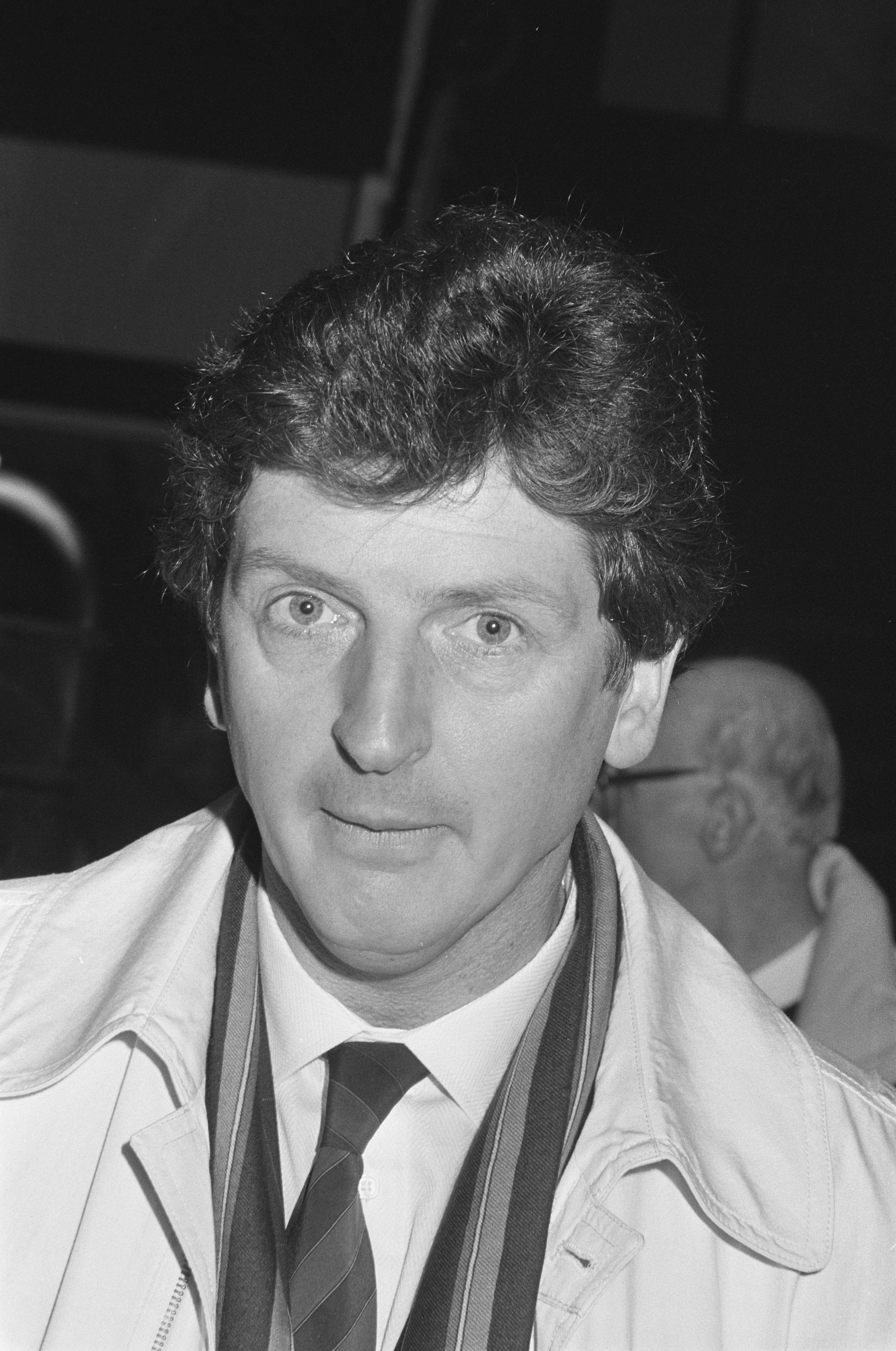
Roy Hodgson, a former Palace player, was manager from 2017 to 2021 and again 2023 to 2024, helping establish the club's longest spell in the top-flight.

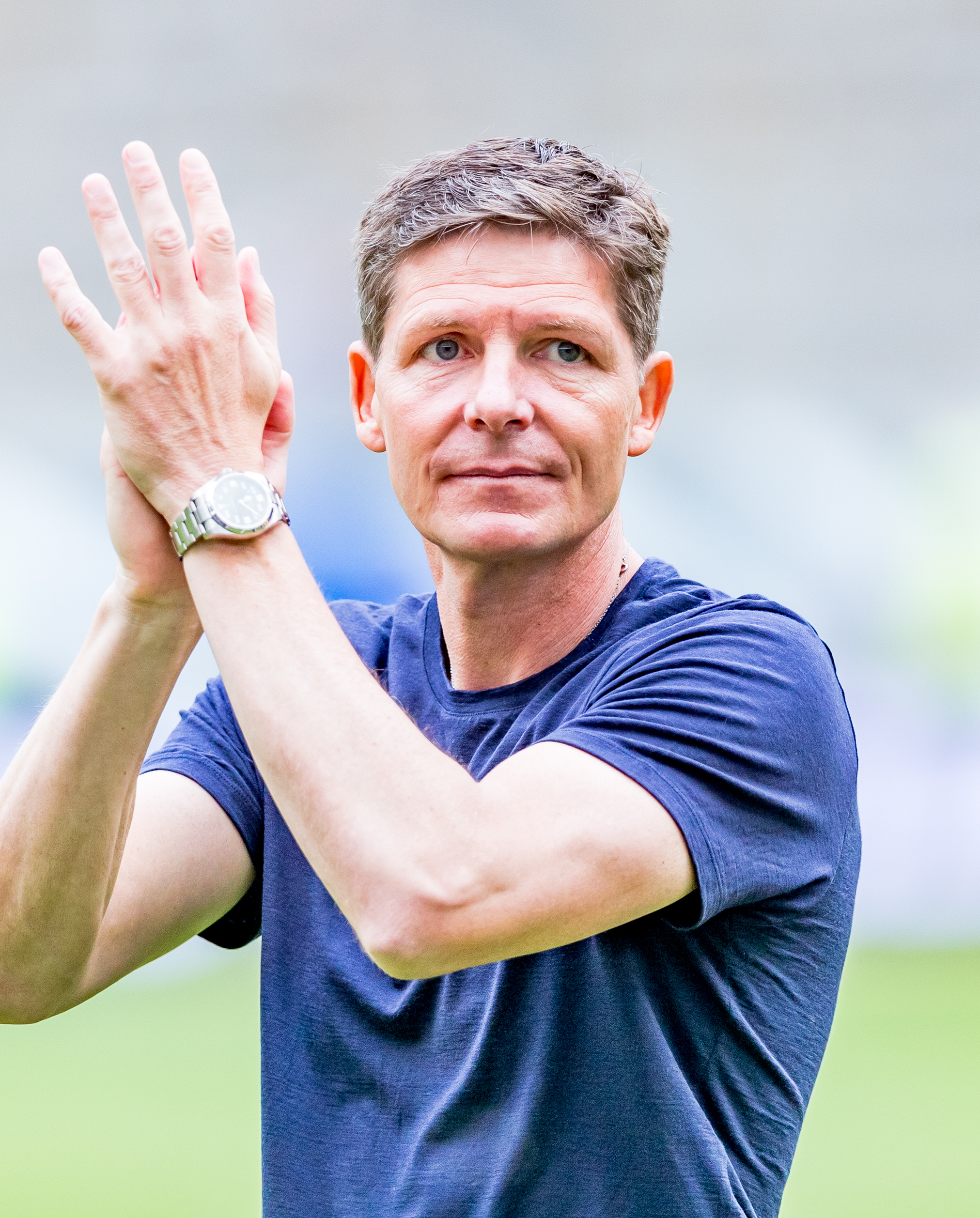
Oliver Glasner led the club to its first ever major trophy, the 2024–25 FA Cup, and qualification to European competition for the first time, winning the 2025–26 UEFA Conference League. Glasner was also the club’s fourth manager from outside the British Isles.

Manager	Nat.	From	To	Record					Honours	Notes
Manager	Nat.	From	To	Pld	W	D	L	W%	Honours	Notes
Jack Robson	ENG	1905	1907	77	35	18	24	45.45	Southern League Division Two championship: 1905–06	
Edmund Goodman	ENG	1907	1925	613	242	166	205	39.48	London Challenge Cup winners: 1912–13, 1913–14, 1920–21 Football League Third Division winners: 1920–21	
Alex Maley	SCO	1925	1927	83	36	16	31	43.37		
Fred Mavin	ENG	1927	1930	132	63	33	36	47.73		
Jack Tresadern	ENG	1930	1935	213	98	44	71	46.01		
Tom Bromilow	ENG	1935	1936	44	23	5	16	52.27		(Note: Tom Bromilow served two terms as manager. His cumulative managerial statistics read as – Record (Pld 162, W 71, D 40, L 51, W% 43.83).)
R. S. Moyes	ENG	1936	1936	23	6	6	11	26.09		
Tom Bromilow	ENG	1937	1939	118	48	35	35	40.68		
George Irwin (Note: Formerly played for the club.)	ENG	1939	1947	45	15	11	19	33.33		
Jack Butler	ENG	1947	1949	88	23	24	41	26.14		
Ronnie Rooke	ENG	1949	1950	62	19	15	28	30.65		
Fred Dawes Charlie Slade	ENG; ENG	1950	1951	40	8	10	22	20.00		
Laurie Scott	ENG	1951	1954	145	43	41	61	29.66		
Cyril Spiers	ENG	1954	1958	181	52	53	76	28.73		
George Smith	ENG	1958	1960	100	42	27	31	42.00		
Arthur Rowe	ENG	1960	1962	132	52	32	48	39.39	Football League Fourth Division promotion: 1960–61	(Note: Arthur Rowe served two terms as manager. His cumulative managerial statistics read as – Record (Pld 139, W 54, D 34, L 51, W% 38.85).)
Dick Graham	ENG	1962	1966	150	68	41	41	45.33	Football League Third Division promotion: 1963–64	
Arthur Rowe †	ENG	1966	1966	7	2	2	3	28.57		
Bert Head	ENG	1966	1973	328	101	96	131	30.79	Football League Second Division promotion: 1968–69	
Malcolm Allison	ENG	1973	1976	146	52	45	49	35.62		(Note: Malcolm Allison served two terms as manager. His cumulative managerial statistics read as – Record (Pld 155, W 53, D 48, L 54, W% 34.19).)
Terry Venables	ENG	1976	1980	189	69	68	52	36.51	Football League Third Division promotion: 1976–77 Football League Second Division championship: 1978–79	(Note: Terry Venables served two terms as manager. His cumulative managerial statistics read as – Record (Pld 220, W 80, D 76, L 64, W% 36.36).)
Ernie Walley †	WAL	1980	1980	6	1	1	4	16.67		
Malcolm Allison	ENG	1980	1981	9	1	3	5	11.11		
Dario Gradi	ENG	1981	1981	30	7	3	20	23.33		
Steve Kember	ENG	1981	1982	30	8	8	14	26.67		(Note: Steve Kember served four terms as manager (including one spell as co-manager). His cumulative managerial statistics read as – Record (Pld 59, W 18, D 14, L 27, W% 30.51).)
Alan Mullery	ENG	1982	1984	98	31	27	40	31.63		
Steve Coppell	ENG	1984	1993	442	179	113	150	40.50	Football League Second Division play-off winners: 1988–89 Full Members' Cup winners: 1990–91	(Note: Steve Coppell served four terms as manager. His cumulative managerial statistics read as – Record (Pld 596, W 223, D 166, L 207, W% 37.42).)
Alan Smith	ENG	1993	1995	108	48	25	35	44.44	Football League First Division championship: 1993–94	(Note: Alan Smith served two terms as manager. His cumulative managerial statistics read as – Record (Pld 163, W 62, D 43, L 58, W% 38.04).)
Steve Coppell (2)	ENG	1995	1996	32	9	14	9	28.13		
Dave Bassett	ENG	1996	1997	60	29	15	16	48.33		
Steve Coppell (3)	ENG	1997	1998	51	16	13	22	31.37	Football League First Division play-off winners: 1996–97	
Attilio Lombardo ‡	ITA	1998	1998	7	2	0	5	28.57		
Ron Noades Ray Lewington †	ENG; ENG	1998	1998	2	0	1	1	0.00		
Terry Venables	ENG	1998	1999	31	11	8	12	35.48		
Steve Coppell (4)	ENG	1999	2000	40	17	6	17	42.50		
Alan Smith	ENG	2000	2001	55	14	18	23	25.45		
Steve Kember †	ENG	2001	2001	2	2	0	0	100.00		
Steve Bruce	ENG	2001	2001	18	11	2	5	61.11		
Terry Bullivant Steve Kember †	ENG; ENG	2001	2001	4	1	0	3	25.00		
Trevor Francis	ENG	2001	2003	78	28	22	28	35.90		
Steve Kember	ENG	2003	2003	23	7	6	10	30.43		
Kit Symons †	WAL	2003	2003	9	3	3	3	33.33		
Iain Dowie	NIR	2003	2006	123	50	29	44	40.65	Football League First Division play-off winners: 2003–04	
Peter Taylor	ENG	2006	2007	60	21	16	23	35.00		
Neil Warnock	ENG	2007	2010	129	47	39	43	36.43		(Note: Neil Warnock served two terms as manager. His cumulative managerial statistics read as – Record (Pld 146, W 50, D 45, L 51, W% 34.25).)
Paul Hart	ENG	2010	2010	14	3	6	5	21.43		
George Burley	SCO	2010	2011	25	7	5	13	28.00		
Dougie Freedman	SCO	2011	2012	90	32	27	31	35.56		
Curtis Fleming † Lennie Lawrence †	ENG; IRL	2012	2012	2	1	1	0	50.00		
Curtis Fleming †	IRL	2012	2012	1	1	0	0	100.00		
Ian Holloway	ENG	2012	2013	46	14	14	18	30.43	Football League Championship play-off winners: 2012–13	
Keith Millen †	ENG	2013	2013	4	1	1	2	25.00		
Tony Pulis	WAL	2013	2014	28	12	5	11	42.86		
Keith Millen †	ENG	2014	2014	3	1	0	2	33.33		
Neil Warnock (2)	ENG	2014	2014	17	3	6	8	17.65		
Keith Millen †	ENG	2014	2015	2	0	2	0	0.00		
Alan Pardew	ENG	2015	2016	87	35	13	39	40.23		
Sam Allardyce	ENG	2016	2017	24	9	3	12	37.50		
Frank de Boer	NED	2017	2017	5	1	0	4	20.00		
Roy Hodgson	ENG	2017	2021	162	54	37	71	33.33		
Patrick Vieira	FRA	2021	2023	74	22	25	27	29.73		
Paddy McCarthy†	IRL	2023	2023	1	0	0	1	0.00		
Roy Hodgson (2)	ENG	2023	2024	38	12	10	16	31.58		
Paddy McCarthy†	IRL	2024	2024	1	0	1	0	0.00		
Oliver Glasner	AUT	2024	2026	121	51	36	34	42.15	FA Cup winners: 2024–25 FA Community Shield winners: 2025 UEFA Conference League winners: 2025–26	
Pierre Sage	FRA	2026	2026	16	5	3	8	31.25		
Thomas Frank	DEN	2026	present	0	0	0	0	—		
