= 1917–18 Huddersfield Town A.F.C. season =

Huddersfield Town
1917–18 season
- Chairman: William Hardcastle
- Manager: Arthur Fairclough
- Stadium: Leeds Road
- Wartime League Midland Section Sudsibiary Comepition: 8th 7th
- Top goalscorer: League: All: Frank Mann (11)
- Highest home attendance: 4,000 vs Leeds City (26 December 1917)
- Lowest home attendance: 1,000 vs Nottingham Forest (1 September 1917)
- Biggest win: 5–0 vs Bradford City (5 April 1919)
- Biggest defeat: 0–3 vs Nottingham Forest (8 September 1917); 1–4 vs Leicester Fosse (22 September 1917); 0–3 vs Leeds City (25 December 1917)

Huddersfield Town's 1917–18 campaign saw Town continuing to play in the wartime football league. Town played in the Midland League and finished in 8th place, as well as 7th place in the Subsidiary Competition.

== Results ==
=== Midland Division ===
Date	Opponents	Home/Away	Result F–A	Scorers	Attendance
1 September 1917	Nottingham Forest	H	2–1	Hall, Elliott	1,000
8 September 1917	Nottingham Forest	A	0–3		2,000
15 September 1917	Leicester Fosse	H	1–2	Mann	?
22 September 1917	Leicester Fosse	A	1–4	Baker (pen)	5,500
29 September 1917	Hull City	H	4–2	J. Anderson (2), T. Anderson, Wooding	3,000
6 October 1917	Hull City	A	1–3	J. Anderson	2,000
27 October 1917	Barnsley	A	1–2	J. Anderson	2,000
3 November 1917	Barnsley	H	5–0	Baker (pen), Elliott, Wooding, Islip, Mann	?
10 November 1917	Bradford (Park Avenue)	A	2–1	Islip, McIlvenney	4,000
17 November 1917	Bradford (Park Avenue)	H	1–0	McIlvenney	3,000
24 November 1917	Sheffield United	A	0–1		7,000
1 December 1917	Sheffield United	H	3–1	Hall (2), Elliott	?
8 December 1917	Rotherham County	H	1–1	Hall	2,000
15 December 1917	Rotherham County	A	1–3	L. Smelt (og)	?
25 December 1917	Leeds City	A	0–3		5,000
26 December 1917	Leeds City	H	1–3	Elliott	4,000
29 December 1917	Lincoln City	A	1–2	Wooding	?
5 January 1918	Grimsby Town	H	2–0	Crowther (2, 1 pen)	?
12 January 1918	Grimsby Town	A	0–1		1,000
19 January 1918	Birmingham	H	4–2	Buchan (2), Hall, Mann	2,000
26 January 1918	Birmingham	A	1–2	Bell	15,000
2 February 1918	Notts County	A	2–3	Mann (2, 1 pen)	2,000
9 February 1918	Notts County	H	0–0		?: Match abandoned at half-time due to waterlogged pitch.
16 February 1918	Bradford City	A	2–0	Mann, Elliott	3,000
23 February 1918	Bradford City	H	2–2	Mann (2)	2,000
2 March 1918	Sheffield Wednesday	H	4–0	Buchan (3), Hall	?
9 March 1918	Sheffield Wednesday	A	1–3	Elliott (pen)	7,000
1 April 1918	Lincoln City	H	4–0	Crowther (2), Elliott (2)	?
2 April 1918	Notts County	H	2–1	Moore, Mann	?

=== Subsidiary Competition ===
Date	Opponents	Home/Away	Result F–A	Scorers	Attendance
16 March 1918	Leeds City	H	4–2	Hall (3, 1 pen), Mann	3,000
23 March 1918	Leeds City	A	0–1		4,000
30 March 1918	Bradford City	A	3–5	Mann, Etherington, Vaughan	1,000
6 April 1918	Bradford City	H	1–1	G.D. Chaplin (og)	?
13 April 1918	Bradford (Park Avenue)	A	2–1	Hall, Elliott	3,000
20 April 1918	Bradford (Park Avenue)	H	3–1	Crowther, Etherington, Elliott	2,000
