= Alexander Doolan =

Alexander Doolan may refer to:

- Alex Doolan (born 1985), Australian cricketer
- Sandy Doolan, Scottish footballer who played for Bradford City 1912–1920, and other teams before and after
