= 1916–17 Huddersfield Town A.F.C. season =

Huddersfield Town
1916–17 season
- Chairman: William Hardcastle
- Manager: Arthur Fairclough
- Stadium: Leeds Road
- Wartime League Midland Section Sudsibiary Comepition: 4th 6th
- Top goalscorer: League: All: T. Hall (13)
- Highest home attendance: 6,000 vs Bradford (Park Avenue) (26 December 1916)
- Lowest home attendance: 1,000 vs Grimsby Town (3 February 1917); Sheffield Wednesday (10 March 1917)
- Biggest win: 4–1 vs Leicester Fosse (21 October 1916); 3–0 vs Rotherham County (17 February 1917); 3–0 vs Sheffield Wednesday (10 March 1917)
- Biggest defeat: 1–4 vs Bradford City (14 October 1916)

Huddersfield Town's 1916–17 campaign saw Town continuing to play in the wartime football league. Town played in the Midland League and finished in the 4th place, as well as the 6th place in the Subsidiary Competition.

== Results ==
=== Midland Division ===
Date	Opponents	Home/Away	Result F–A	Scorers	Attendance
2 September 1916	Birmingham	A	1–2	Elliott	12,500
9 September 1916	Hull City	H	2–1	Holley, T. Hall	3,500
16 September 1916	Nottingham Forest	A	1–0	Elliott	3,000
23 September 1916	Barnsley	H	0–0		5,000
30 September 1916	Leeds City	A	0–1		8,000
7 October 1916	Sheffield United	H	2–1	T. Hall, Best	5,000
14 October 1916	Bradford City	A	1–4	Elliott	3,000
21 October 1916	Leicester Fosse	H	4–1	Mann, Connor (2), Moore	4,000
28 October 1916	Grimsby Town	A	1–2	J. Baker	1,000
4 November 1916	Notts County	H	1–0	Moore	3,000
11 November 1916	Rotherham County	A	3–1	T. Hall, Mann, Moore	4,000
18 November 1916	Chesterfield Town	H	2–1	Elliott, Mann	2,000
25 November 1916	Lincoln City	H	3–1	T. Hall (2), Moore	2,000
2 December 1916	Sheffield Wednesday	A	0–0		4,000
9 December 1916	Birmingham	H	2–1	J. Baker, T. Hall	3,500
16 December 1916	Hull City	A	1–0	T. Hall	1,500
23 December 1916	Nottingham Forest	H	1–2	T. Hall	?
25 December 1916	Bradford (Park Avenue)	A	2–1	Wilde, Fayers	3,000
26 December 1916	Bradford (Park Avenue)	H	0–0		6,000
30 December 1916	Barnsley	A	1–1	Moore	?
6 January 1917	Leeds City	H	1–1	Moore (pen)	7,000
13 January 1917	Sheffield United	A	0–1		5,000
20 January 1917	Bradford City	H	0–0		?
27 January 1917	Leicester Fosse	A	0–2		?
3 February 1917	Grimsby Town	H	1–0	Wooding	1,000
10 February 1917	Notts County	A	1–2	Mann	1,500
17 February 1917	Rotherham County	H	3–0	T. Hall, F. Robinson (og), Elliott	1,500
24 February 1917	Chesterfield Town	A	3–5	T. Hall (3, 1 pen)	1,500
3 March 1917	Lincoln City	A	1–0	Mann	1,000
10 March 1917	Sheffield Wednesday	H	3–0	Elliott, Wooding, Mann	1,000

=== Subsidiary competition ===
Date	Opponents	Home/Away	Result F–A	Scorers	Attendance
17 March 1917	Bradford City	H	0–0		3,000
24 March 1917	Leeds City	A	2–0	Wooding (2)	4,000
31 March 1917	Bradford (Park Avenue)	H	0–2		3,000
7 April 1917	Bradford City	A	2–1	Elliott, T. Hall	3,000
14 April 1917	Leeds City	H	0–1		3,000
21 April 1917	Bradford (Park Avenue)	A	2–0	Mann, Elliott	3,000
