= Tom Hamilton (footballer, born 1893) =

Scottish footballer

Personal information
- Date of birth: 10 February 1893
- Place of birth: New Cumnock, Scotland
- Date of death: 25 December 1959 (aged 66)
- Place of death: Preston, England
- Height: 5 ft 11 in (1.80 m)
- Position: Right back

Senior career*
| Years | Team | Apps | (Gls) |
| – | Cronberry Eglinton | | |
| 1913–1921 | Kilmarnock | 231 | (11) |
| 1921–1929 | Preston North End | 267 | (0) |
| 1929–1930 | Manchester Central | | |
| 1930–1931 | Great Harwood | | |
| Total | | 498 | (11) |

International career
| 1921 | Scottish League XI | 1 | (0) |
- * Club domestic league appearances and goals

Thomas Hamilton (10 February 1893 – 25 December 1959) was a Scottish footballer who played as a right back, primarily for Kilmarnock and Preston North End.

He was a Scottish Cup winner with Kilmarnock in 1920, was selected for the Scottish Football League XI in January 1921, joined Preston for what has been quoted as a then-record transfer fee of £4,600 a month later, and played in the FA Cup final of 1922 (a defeat to Huddersfield Town). After eight years at Deepdale, Hamilton later featured for Manchester Central and Great Harwood.

== Honours ==
Preston North End

- FA Cup runner-up: 1921–22
