= Tom Duxbury =

English footballer

Personal information
- Full name: Thomas Duxbury
- Date of birth: 15 June 1896
- Place of birth: Accrington, England
- Date of death: 1971 (aged 74–75)
- Position: Wing half

Senior career*
Years	Team	Apps	(Gls)
1919–1920	Accrington Stanley		
1920–1924	Preston North End	51	(1)
1924–1925	Leeds United	2	(0)
1926	Fleetwood		
Total		53	(1)
- * Club domestic league appearances and goals

Thomas Duxbury (15 June 1896 – 1971) was an English footballer who played in the Football League for Leeds United and Preston North End. At Preston, Duxbury played in the 1922 FA Cup final.

== Honours ==
Preston North End

- FA Cup runner-up: 1921–22
