= Roland Woodhouse =

English footballer

Personal information
- Date of birth: 15 January 1897
- Place of birth: Leyland, England
- Date of death: 1969 (aged 71–72)
- Height: 5 ft 5 in (1.65 m)
- Position: Inside forward

Senior career*
Years	Team	Apps	(Gls)
1919–1926	Preston North End	206	(52)
1926–1927	Everton	2	(0)
1927–1930	Wrexham	113	(21)
1930–1931	Halifax Town	13	(2)
- * Club domestic league appearances and goals

Roland Thomas Woodhouse (15 January 1897 – 1969) was an English professional footballer who played as an inside forward. He made appearances in the Football League for Preston North End, Everton, Wrexham and Halifax Town. Whilst at Preston North End, Woodhouse played in the 1922 FA Cup Final.

== Honours ==
Preston North End

- FA Cup runner-up: 1921–22
