= Sidney James (footballer) =

English footballer

Personal information
- Full name: Sidney James
- Date of birth: 1891
- Place of birth: Sheffield, England
- Date of death: 9 April 1917 (aged 26)
- Place of death: Saint-Martin-sur-Cojeul, France
- Positions: Centre forward; left half

Senior career*
Years	Team	Apps	(Gls)
- Bird-in-Hand
1913–1915	Huddersfield Town	12	(2)
- * Club domestic league appearances and goals

Sidney James (1891 – 9 April 1917) was an English professional footballer who played in the Football League for Huddersfield Town as a centre forward.

== Personal life ==
James served in The Duke of Wellington's (West Riding) Regiment and the King's Own Yorkshire Light Infantry during the First World War and held the rank of acting lance corporal. He was killed on 9 April 1917 during the capture of the village of Saint-Martin-sur-Cojeul. He was buried in Cojeul British Cemetery, Saint-Martin-sur-Cojeul.

== Career statistics ==
Appearances and goals by club, season and competition
Club	Season	League			FA Cup		Total	
Club	Season	Division	Apps	Goals	Apps	Goals	Apps	Goals
Huddersfield Town	1913–14	Second Division	9	2	2	0	11	2
Huddersfield Town	1914–15	Second Division	3	0	0	0	3	0
Career total			12	2	2	0	14	2
