= Peter Quinn (footballer, born 1892) =

English footballer

Personal information
- Date of birth: 3 December 1892
- Place of birth: Sunderland, England
- Date of death: 1976 (aged 83–84)
- Height: 5 ft 7 1/2 in (1.71 m)
- Position: Midfielder

Senior career*
Years	Team	Apps	(Gls)
- Spennymoor United
1910–1920	Blackpool	152	(16)
1920–1922	Preston North End	87	(10)
- Fleetwood Town
1922	Bury	6	(1)
1923	New Brighton	30	(2)
- * Club domestic league appearances and goals

Peter Quinn (3 December 1892 – 1976) was an English footballer. He made over 150 Football League appearances for Blackpool in the early 20th century. He also played for Preston North End and Bury, amongst other clubs.

== Honours ==
Preston North End

- FA Cup runner-up: 1921–22
