= Hugh Roberts (footballer) =

Welsh footballer

Personal information
- Full name: Hugh Pierce Roberts
- Date of birth: 14 October 1882
- Place of birth: Rhyl, Wales
- Date of death: 5 December 1969 (aged 87)
- Place of death: Coventry, England
- Height: 5 ft 4 in (1.63 m)
- Position: Outside right

Senior career*
| Years | Team | Apps | (Gls) |
- Port Sunlight
- St Helens Recreation
| 1908–1909 | Southport Central | 29 | (5) |
| 1909–1913 | Leeds City | 108 | (13) |
| 1913–1914 | Scunthorpe & Lindsey United | | |
| 1914–1915 | Luton Town | | |
- * Club domestic league appearances and goals

Hugh Pierce Roberts (14 October 1882 – 5 December 1969) was a Welsh professional footballer, best remembered for his four years as an outside right in the Football League with Leeds City.

== Personal life ==
Roberts' had a wife and four children and his brothers Albert and Dick were also footballers. Roberts served as a private in the Middlesex Regiment's Football Battalion during the First World War, but he was unable to return to football after sustaining a fractured ankle in an accident in France in September 1918.

== Career statistics ==
Appearances and goals by club, season and competition
| Club | Season | League | | | FA Cup | | Other | | Total | |
| Club | Season | Division | Apps | Goals | Apps | Goals | Apps | Goals | Apps | Goals |
|---|---|---|---|---|---|---|---|---|---|---|
| Southport Central | 1908–09 | Lancashire Combination First Division | 29 | 5 | 1 | 0 | 2 (Note: Appearances in Lancashire Senior Cup) | 0 | 32 | 5 |
| Leeds City | 1909–10 | Second Division | 24 | 6 | 1 | 0 | — | | 25 | 6 |
| Leeds City | 1910–11 | Second Division | 35 | 4 | 1 | 1 | — | | 36 | 5 |
| Leeds City | 1911–12 | Second Division | 38 | 2 | 2 | 1 | — | | 40 | 3 |
| Leeds City | 1912–13 | Second Division | 11 | 1 | — | | — | | 11 | 1 |
| Leeds City | Total | | 108 | 13 | 4 | 2 | — | | 112 | 15 |
| Career total | | | 137 | 18 | 5 | 2 | 2 | 0 | 144 | 20 |
