= Tommy Roberts (footballer, born 1898) =

English footballer

Personal information
- Full name: William Thomas Roberts
- Date of birth: 29 November 1898
- Place of birth: Handsworth, England
- Date of death: 13 October 1965 (aged 66)
- Height: 5 ft 11 in (1.80 m)
- Position: Centre forward

Senior career*
Years	Team	Apps	(Gls)
- Soho Villa
1914	Leicester Fosse	0	(0)
1919–1924	Preston North End	199	(118)
1924–1925	Burnley	49	(28)
1926–1927	Preston North End	55	(39)
1928	Tottenham Hotspur	4	(2)
- Dick, Kerr's
- Chorley

International career
1923–1924	England	2	(2)
- * Club domestic league appearances and goals

William Thomas Roberts (29 November 1898 – 13 October 1965) was an English professional footballer who played for Soho Villa, Leicester Fosse, Preston North End, Burnley, Tottenham Hotspur, Dick, Kerr's, Chorley and England at international level.

== Football career ==
Roberts began his career at non League Soho Villa and later Leicester Fosse.

After World War I he joined Preston North End and made his debut against Blackburn Rovers in 1919. The high scoring centre forward was top scorer in his first season with 29 goals. Roberts featured in 199 matches and scored 118 goals between 1919 and 1924.

In 1924 he signed for Burnley where he scored a further 28 goals in 49 matches.

He returned to Deepdale for his second spell at the club in 1926 and once again top scored with 30 goals in 55 matches.

Roberts broke an arm in a motor vehicle accident in 1927 and suffered injury problems before joining Tottenham Hotspur in 1928. He scored twice on his Lilywhites debut in a 4–1 victory over Oldham Athletic at White Hart Lane in August 1928 in the old Second Division. He made three more appearances, but never found the net again for the Spurs.

After leaving London Roberts played for the Dick Kerr's XI and finally ended his playing career at Chorley.

== International career ==
Roberts played twice for England. His first match was against Belgium in November 1923 and played in the following game against Wales. He scored in both matches but was never capped again.

== After football ==
Roberts worked as a publican for 30 years in the Preston area.

== Honours ==
Preston North End

- FA Cup runner-up: 1921–22
