= Ralph Rodgerson =

English footballer (1892–1939)

Personal information
- Full name: Ralph Rodgerson
- Date of birth: 30 December 1892
- Place of birth: Sunderland, England
- Date of death: 10 July 1939 (aged 46)
- Place of death: Sunderland, England
- Height: 5 ft 8 in (1.73 m)
- Position: Full back

Senior career*
Years	Team	Apps	(Gls)
- Pallion Institute
	Burnley	0	(0)
1913–1921	Huddersfield Town	26	(0)
	Dundee (loan)	2	(0)
1921–1922	Leeds United	27	(0)
1922–1923	Sunderland West End		
1923	Dundee	5	(0)
- Spennymoor United
- Carlisle United
- * Club domestic league appearances and goals

Ralph Rodgerson (30 December 1892 – 10 July 1939) was an English professional footballer who made 53 appearances in the Football League playing as a full back for Huddersfield Town and Leeds United. He was on the books of Burnley without playing for their first team, played in the Scottish League for Dundee both during the First World War (on loan from Huddersfield) and afterwards, and played non-League football for Pallion Institute, Sunderland West End, Spennymoor United and Carlisle United.

== Life and career ==
Rodgerson was born in Sunderland in 1892, a son of Joseph Rodgerson, an iron worker, and his wife Margaret. The 1911 Census records the 18-year-old Rodgerson also an iron worker and living with his extended family in the Pallion district of the town. He played football for a local team, Pallion Institute, and spent time with Burnley during the 1912–13 season before signing for another Second Division club, Huddersfield Town, in 1913. Rodgerson made his first-team debut on 17 October 1914, standing in at right back for the injured Willie McLaren in a 3–2 win away to Fulham. It was his last senior outing of the season, at the end of which competitive football was suspended for the duration of the First World War.

He was able to play for Huddersfield in the wartime matches: in 1917, the Sheffield-based Sports Special assessed him as a "dashing left back—a determined tackier, with big clearances in both boots", but warned him against "over-robustness", suggesting that "his weight, fairly applied, in conjunction with his skill, will enable him to answer all reasonable requirements." and also appeared twice for Dundee in the 1916–17 Scottish League, which did continue during the war.

In 1919, Rodgerson played three times for Hartlepools United in the Northern Victory League before returning to Huddersfield for the resumption of the Football League. He had a run of seven matches at left back early in the 1919–20 Football League season and made four more appearances later on, in each case covering for one or other of the regular backs, Fred Bullock and James Wood, as Huddersfield finished second in the table and were promoted to the First Division. The new season began in similar vein: with Wood injured, Rodgerson partnered Bullock in four matches, after which Huddersfield were top of the table, but as soon as Wood regained fitness Rodgerson lost his place. For much of the middle part of the season, Rodgerson was in the side, and he took his top-flight appearance total to 14. His last was on 12 February, and in March, he signed for Leeds United of the Second Division.

According to the Yorkshire Evening Post, the transfer fee was undisclosed, but "it may be assumed that ... it is at a much more moderate figure than the £1,500 which Town refused for Rodgerson's transfer last season." He was described as "very sturdily built", and despite "a tendency to become reckless in his tackling when hard pressed, and to dribble the ball instead of getting rid of it ... his play improved markedly while he was regularly included in the league team." He played three times in what remained of the season, and began the 1921–22 season partnering Bert Duffield in the league side. Rodgerson continued in the team, either alongside Duffield or Jimmy Frew, until mid-February 1922 when manager Arthur Fairclough decided to pair Frew and Duffield.

Rodgerson was transfer-listed by Leeds at a fee of £250, and played Wearside League football for Sunderland West End before rejoining Dundee. Although he made a promising debut, the slowness initially attributed to an understandable lack of fitness failed to improve, his tackling lost its certainty, his clearances under pressure became panicky, and he lost his place. His performances picked up again, and he played seven matches in all for the first team, five in the League and two in the Scottish Cup. He returned to England and played for North-Eastern League clubs Spennymoor United and Carlisle United.

Rodgerson was married to Evelyn. A son, also named Ralph, played First Division football for Sunderland in the 1930s. In July 1939, the 46-year-old Rodgerson was working as a labourer for the Sunderland Gas Company when he collapsed and died while digging a trench. An inquest returned a verdict of death from natural causes, specifically heart disease.
