= 1922 FA Charity Shield =

- Event: FA Charity Shield
Huddersfield Town	Liverpool
1	0
- Date: 10 May 1922
- Venue: Old Trafford, Manchester
- Attendance: 20,000

The 1922 Football Association Charity Shield was played on 10 May 1922. The game was played at Old Trafford, home of Manchester United, and was contested by the FA Cup holders Huddersfield Town and First Division champions Liverpool. The game ended in a 1–0 win for Huddersfield Town with the winning goal scored by Tom Wilson. This was the last Charity Shield game to take place in May.

== Venue ==
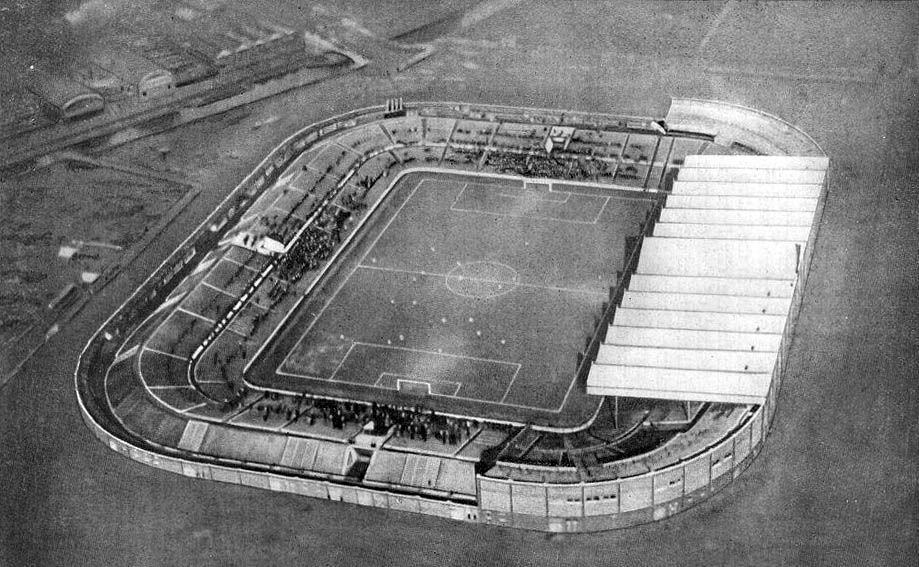
Old Trafford, venue

== Match details ==
10 May 1922

Huddersfield Town	1–0	Liverpool
Wilson

Old Trafford, Manchester
Attendance: 20,000

Huddersfield Town
Liverpool

GK	1	(Scotland) Sandy Mutch
	2	(England) James Wood
	3	(England) Sam Wadsworth
	4	(England) Charlie Slade
	5	(England) Tom Wilson (c)
	6	(England) Billy Watson
	7	(England) George Richardson
	8	(England) Frank Mann
	9	(England) Ernie Islip
	10	(England) Clem Stephenson
	11	(England) Billy Smith
Manager:
(England) Herbert Chapman

GK	1	(Ireland) Elisha Scott
	2	(England) Ephraim Longworth
	3	(Scotland) Donald McKinlay (c)
	4	(Scotland) Jock McNab
	5	(England) Walter Wadsworth
	6	(England) Tom Bromilow
	7	(Ireland) Bill Lacey
	8	(England) Dick Forshaw
	9	(England) Harry Chambers
	10	(Wales) Harry Beadles
	11	(England) Fred Hopkin
Manager:
(England) David Ashworth

== See also ==
- 1921–22 Football League
- 1921–22 FA Cup
