= Johnny Williamson (footballer, born 1895) =

Scottish footballer

Personal information
- Date of birth: 16 October 1895
- Place of birth: Fauldhouse, Scotland
- Date of death: 1979 (aged 83–84)
- Height: 5 ft 6 in (1.68 m)
- Position: Wing half

Senior career*
Years	Team	Apps	(Gls)
1920–1921	Armadale		
1921–1926	Preston North End	63	(2)
1926–1927	Grimsby Town	1	(0)
1927–1929	Lancaster Town		
1929–1930	Darwen		
1930–193?	Morecambe		
- * Club domestic league appearances and goals

Johnny Williamson (16 October 1895 – 1979) was a Scottish professional footballer who played as a wing half.

== Honours ==
Preston North End

- FA Cup runner-up: 1921–22
