= 1920–21 Leeds United A.F.C. season =

Leeds United
1920–21 season
- Chairman: Hilton Crowther
- Manager: Arthur Fairclough
- Stadium: Elland Road
- Second Division: 14th
- FA Cup: Withdrew after preliminary round

The 1920–21 season was the second season in the history of Leeds United Association Football Club, a professional football club from Leeds, England. It was the club's first season in the Football League, having been elected into the League ahead of the new season from the Midland Football League. The club finished 14th in the Football League Second Division out of 20 teams, and also played in the FA Cup, taking part in two qualifying rounds before withdrawing from the competition.

== Background ==
Leeds' first football club, Leeds City F.C., were formed in 1904, but were expelled from the Football League after eight matches of the 1919–20 season, over allegations of making illegal payments to players during the First World War. Leeds City's playing squad and equipment were auctioned off by the Football League at the Hotel Metropole in Leeds on 17 October 1919, and Leeds United A.F.C. was founded at Salem Chapel later that day in a public meeting chaired by local solicitor Alf Masser. The club played in the Midland Football League during the 1919–20 season, occupying the space vacated by Leeds City's reserve team, and were initially managed by former Leeds City player Dick Ray. A merger with Huddersfield Town A.F.C. was proposed shortly after by their chairman Hilton Crowther, though the club's supporters instead bought out Crowther's share in the club, and he became chairman of Leeds United and invested a sum of £35,000 in the club. He also appointed Huddersfield manager Arthur Fairclough as manager of Leeds United, with Dick Ray stepping down to become Fairclough's assistant. Leeds were elected into the Football League on 31 May 1920 and were placed in the Second Division.

== Competitions ==
=== Second Division ===
==== League table ====
| Pos | Team | Pld | W | D | L | GF | GA | GAv | Pts |
|---|---|---|---|---|---|---|---|---|---|
| 12 | Leicester City | 42 | 12 | 16 | 14 | 39 | 46 | 0.848 | 40 |
| 13 | Hull City | 42 | 10 | 20 | 12 | 43 | 53 | 0.811 | 40 |
| 14 | Leeds United | 42 | 14 | 10 | 18 | 40 | 45 | 0.889 | 38 |
| 15 | Wolverhampton Wanderers | 42 | 16 | 6 | 20 | 49 | 66 | 0.742 | 38 |
| 16 | Barnsley | 42 | 10 | 16 | 16 | 48 | 50 | 0.960 | 36 |

==== Matches ====
| Win | Draw | Loss |

First Division match results
| Date | Opponent | Venue | Result F–A | Scorers | Attendance |
|---|---|---|---|---|---|
| 28 August 1920 | Port Vale | A | 0–2 | | 15,000 |
| 1 September 1920 | South Shields | H | 1–2 | Armitage | 16,958 |
| 4 September 1920 | Port Vale | H | 3–1 | Best, Ellson (2) | 15,000 |
| 8 September 1920 | South Shields | A | 0–3 | | 15,000 |
| 11 September 1920 | Leicester City | A | 1–1 | Ellson | 16,000 |
| 18 September 1920 | Leicester City | H | 3–1 | Ellson, Goldthorpe (2, 1 pen.) | 11,000 |
| 25 September 1920 | Blackpool | A | 0–1 | | 8,000 |
| 2 October 1920 | Blackpool | H | 2–0 | Walton, Mason | 10,000 |
| 9 October 1920 | Sheffield Wednesday | A | 0–2 | | 20,000 |
| 16 October 1920 | Sheffield Wednesday | H | 2–0 | Thompson, Ellson | 15,000 |
| 23 October 1920 | Hull City | A | 1–0 | Thompson | 10,000 |
| 30 October 1920 | Hull City | H | 1–1 | Ellson | 20,000 |
| 6 November 1920 | Stoke | A | 0–4 | | 10,000 |
| 13 November 1920 | Stoke | H | 0–0 | | 15,000 |
| 27 November 1920 | Coventry City | A | 1–1 | Lyon | 18,000 |
| 1 December 1920 | Coventry City | H | 4–0 | Thompson (2), Ellson, Mason | 10,000 |
| 4 December 1920 | Notts County | A | 2–1 | Lyon (2) | 14,000 |
| 11 December 1920 | Notts County | H | 3–0 | Thompson (3) | 12,000 |
| 18 December 1920 | Birmingham | A | 0–1 | | 20,000 |
| 25 December 1920 | Fulham | H | 0–0 | | 25,000 |
| 27 December 1920 | Fulham | A | 0–1 | | 30,000 |
| 1 January 1921 | Birmingham | H | 1–0 | Baker (pen.) | 24,000 |
| 8 January 1921 | Rotherham County | H | 1–0 | Ellson | 18,000 |
| 15 January 1921 | Wolverhampton Wanderers | A | 0–3 | | 20,000 |
| 22 January 1921 | Wolverhampton Wanderers | H | 3–0 | Thompson (2), Lyon | 14,000 |
| 29 January 1921 | West Ham United | H | 1–2 | Thompson | 15,000 |
| 5 February 1921 | West Ham United | A | 0–3 | | 23,000 |
| 12 February 1921 | Stockport County | A | 1–3 | Thompson | 9,000 |
| 19 February 1921 | Stockport County | H | 0–2 | | 20,000 |
| 26 February 1921 | Clapton Orient | A | 0–1 | | 17,000 |
| 5 March 1921 | Clapton Orient | H | 2–1 | Musgrove, Baker (pen.) | 18,000 |
| 12 March 1921 | Bury | A | 1–1 | Howarth | 10,000 |
| 19 March 1921 | Bury | H | 1–0 | Musgrove | 16,000 |
| 26 March 1921 | Bristol City | H | 0–1 | | 20,000 |
| 28 March 1921 | Cardiff City | A | 0–1 | | 30,000 |
| 29 March 1921 | Cardiff City | H | 1–2 | Howarth | 20,000 |
| 2 April 1921 | Bristol City | A | 0–0 | | 24,000 |
| 9 April 1921 | Barnsley | H | 0–0 | | 13,000 |
| 16 April 1921 | Barnsley | A | 1–1 | Howarth | 12,000 |
| 23 April 1921 | Nottingham Forest | H | 1–1 | Howarth | 12,000 |
| 30 April 1921 | Nottingham Forest | A | 0–1 | | 8,000 |
| 7 May 1921 | Rotherham County | A | 2–0 | Howarth (2, 1 pen.) | 10,000 |

=== FA Cup ===
FA Cup match details
| Round | Date | Opponent | Venue | Result F–A | Scorers | Attendance |
|---|---|---|---|---|---|---|
| Extra preliminary round | 11 September 1920 | Boothtown | H | 5–2 | Armitage (2), O'Doherty (3) | 1,500 |
| Preliminary round | 25 September 1920 | Leeds Steelworks | H | 7–0 | Butler (3), Thompson, Hart, O'Doherty, Waterhouse | 3,000 |
Leeds United withdrew from the FA Cup after the preliminary round.

== Bibliography ==
- Jarred, Martin; MacDonald, Malcolm (1986). Leeds United: a complete record 1919–1986. Derby: Breedon Books Sport. ISBN 0-907969-17-8. OCLC 14977257.
