= Ralph Rodgerson (footballer, born 1913) =

English footballer (1913–1972)

Personal information
- Full name: Ralph Rodgerson
- Date of birth: 25 December 1913
- Place of birth: Sunderland, England
- Date of death: 18 April 1972 (aged 58)
- Place of death: Sunderland, England
- Height: 5 ft 10 in (1.78 m)
- Position: Full back

Senior career*
Years	Team	Apps	(Gls)
- Millfield
19??–1935	Shotton Colliery Welfare		
1935–1942	Sunderland	5	(0)
- * Club domestic league appearances and goals

Ralph Rodgerson (25 December 1913 – 18 April 1972) was an English professional footballer who played in the Football League as a full back for Sunderland.

== Life and career ==
Rodgerson was born in Sunderland in 1913, the son of Ralph Rodgerson and his wife Evelyn. Ralph senior was a professional footballer who played in the Football League for Huddersfield Town and Leeds United and in the Scottish League for Dundee.

Rodgerson played Sunderland and District League football for Millfield – he also played cricket for the Miilfield club alongside his father – and Wearside League football for Shotton Colliery Welfare before signing professional forms with Football League First Division club Sunderland in December 1935. With the club's sixth League title already confirmed, Rodgerson was given a debut on 18 April 1936, playing at left back in a 4–3 win at home to Huddersfield Town, and also played in the remaining two matches of the season, which were both heavy defeats. He made two more first-team appearances, both at home to Manchester United, one in 1936–37 and the last in 1938–39, before competitive football was suspended for the duration of the Second World War. He played for Sunderland and for North Shields in wartime matches, but did not resume a professional career afterwards.

The 1939 Register finds Rodgerson living in Sunderland with his wife, Vera, and working as a plater's helper. He joined the police in December 1939. He played for the Sunderland Police football team during the war, and for their cricket team until well into the 1950s. Rodgerson died in Sunderland in 1972 at the age of 58.
