= Joe McCall =

English footballer

Joe McCall (6 July 1886 – 3 February 1965) was an English professional footballer, playing centre half.

He appeared for Preston North End and England, playing for the Deepdale club for 20 seasons before retiring in 1924.

== Honours ==
Preston North End

- FA Cup runner-up: 1921–22
