= Harry Brough =

English footballer

Personal information
- Full name: Henry Burton Brough
- Date of birth: 27 December 1896
- Place of birth: Gainsborough, Lincolnshire, England
- Date of death: 20 August 1955 (aged 59)
- Height: 5 ft 9 1/2 in (1.77 m)
- Position: Wing half

Senior career*
Years	Team	Apps	(Gls)
1913–1922	Huddersfield Town	60	(2)
1923–1925	Stoke City	85	(1)
Total		145	(3)
- * Club domestic league appearances and goals

Henry Burton Brough (27 December 1896 – 1975) was an English footballer who played in the Football League for Huddersfield Town and Stoke.

== Career ==
Brough was born in Gainsborough, Lincolnshire and began his career with Huddersfield Town in 1913. His career at Huddersfield was hampered by World War I but once the league had resumed he helped the "Town" finish 2nd in 1919–20 gaining promotion to the First Division. Herbert Chapman came in as manager and Brough lost his place in the side being used as a backup player. In February 1923 he joined Stoke City after he had an unsuccessful trial with Manchester United.

He was a regular in the Stoke side in 1923–24 and 1924–25 and scored once against Coventry City in September 1924. After making 85 appearances for Stoke he retired in October 1925.

== Career statistics ==
Appearances and goals by club, season and competition
Club	Season	League			FA Cup		Total	
Club	Season	Division	Apps	Goals	Apps	Goals	Apps	Goals
Huddersfield Town	1913–14	Second Division	6	2	0	0	6	2
Huddersfield Town	1914–15	Second Division	0	0	0	0	0	0
Huddersfield Town	1919–20	Second Division	18	0	0	0	18	0
Huddersfield Town	1920–21	First Division	19	0	0	0	19	0
Huddersfield Town	1921–22	First Division	9	0	0	0	9	0
Huddersfield Town	1922–23	First Division	8	0	0	0	8	0
Huddersfield Town	Total		60	2	0	0	60	2
Stoke City	1922–23	First Division	12	0	0	0	12	0
Stoke City	1923–24	Second Division	33	0	0	0	33	0
Stoke City	1924–25	Second Division	35	1	0	0	35	1
Stoke City	1925–26	Second Division	5	0	0	0	5	0
Stoke City	Total		85	1	0	0	85	1
Career Total			145	3	0	0	145	3

== Honours ==
Huddersfield Town

- Football League Second Division runner-up: 1919–20
