= Colin McKay (footballer) =

Scottish footballer

Personal information
- Full name: Colin McKay
- Date of birth: 1896
- Place of birth: Kilmarnock, Scotland
- Height: 5 ft 9 1/2 in (1.77 m)
- Position: Midfielder

Senior career*
Years	Team	Apps	(Gls)
- Sheffield Wednesday
1920–1922	Huddersfield Town	18	(2)
1922–1923	Bradford City	26	(4)
- * Club domestic league appearances and goals

Colin McKay (born 1896) was a Scottish professional footballer who played in England for Sheffield Wednesday, Huddersfield Town and Bradford City. He was born in Kilmarnock, Scotland.
