= Bob Reid (footballer, born 1887) =

Scottish footballer

Personal information
- Full name: Robert Reid
- Date of birth: 15 May 1887
- Place of birth: Newtongrange, Scotland
- Date of death: Unknown
- Position: Right back

Senior career*
Years	Team	Apps	(Gls)
–	Newtongrange Star		
1906–1909	Heart of Midlothian	52	(0)
1908	→ Broxburn (loan)		
1909	→ Leith Athletic (loan)	2	(0)
1909–1910	Cowdenbeath	22	(0)
1910–1914	Burnley	84	(0)
1914–1915	Huddersfield Town	26	(0)
1915–1921	Southend United	26	(0)
Total		212	(0)
- * Club domestic league appearances and goals

Robert Reid (born 15 May 1887) was a Scottish footballer who played as a right back for Heart of Midlothian (where he took part in the 1907 Scottish Cup Final), Leith Athletic, Cowdenbeath, Burnley, Huddersfield Town and Southend United.

He served with the Royal Garrison Artillery during World War I, and was awarded the Italian Bronze Medal of Military Valor after the conflict ended.
