= Fred Dawes =

English footballer and manager (1911–1989)

Personal information
- Full name: Frederick W. Dawes
- Date of birth: 2 May 1911
- Place of birth: Frimley Green, England
- Date of death: 12 August 1989 (aged 78)
- Place of death: Shirley, England
- Height: 5 ft 8 in (1.73 m)
- Position: Defender

Youth career
- ?–1929: Aldershot

Senior career*
Years	Team	Apps	(Gls)
1929–1936	Northampton Town	162	(1)
1936–1950	Crystal Palace	223	(1)
- Beckenham Town
Total		385 +	(2 +)

Managerial career
- 1950–1951: Crystal Palace (Joint manager, with Charlie Slade)
- * Club domestic league appearances and goals

Frederick W. Dawes (2 May 1911 – 12 August 1989) was an English professional footballer who played in the Football League as a defender for Northampton Town and Crystal Palace. He also managed Crystal Palace and was the younger brother of Albert Dawes, who also played professionally for Crystal Palace and Northampton.

== Playing career ==
Dawes began his youth career with Aldershot and, in 1929, signed for Northampton Town, where his older brother Albert was also a player. Between then and 1936, Dawes made 162 League appearances for the club, scoring once.

In February 1936, Dawes signed for Crystal Palace, once again re-joining his older brother who had moved to Palace in 1933, and immediately established himself in the side being ever-present for the remainder of that season and throughout the 1936–37 season. Dawes went on to make a total of 223 Football League appearances for Palace before being forced to retire as a player, through injury, during the 1949–50 season. Dawes career was notable in that he completed a century of appearances for Crystal Palace either side of World War II.

== Managerial career ==
After retiring as a player, Dawes was appointed as assistant to then Crystal Palace manager Ronnie Rooke. Despite a reasonably successful 1949–50 season and a number of close-season signings, the club had a very poor start to the 1950–51 season. In November 1950, Rooke was relieved of his position and Dawes was appointed as joint-manager, together with chief scout Charlie Slade. However, the partnership was unable to improve upon the season start and the club had to seek re-election in 1951. The 1951–52 season also began poorly and Dawes and Slade were dismissed in October.

== Later career ==
Dawes was reinstated as an amateur by the Football Association after leaving Crystal Palace and went on to play for Beckenham Town. After leaving football altogether, Dawes became a shopkeeper.

He managed Croydon Amateurs FC in their first two seasons, 1953–54 and 1954–55, taking them to the Surrey Senior League Cup and Charity Cup Finals in that inaugural season. After a poor second campaign, he resigned when Chelsea's John Harris was appointed coach without his knowledge.

Fred Dawes died on 12 August 1989 in Shirley, Surrey, aged 78.
