= Rennie Harrison =

English footballer (1897–??)

Personal information
- Date of birth: 1897
- Place of birth: Burnley, England
- Position: Defender

Senior career*
Years	Team	Apps	(Gls)
1919–1920	Huddersfield Town	1	(0)
- * Club domestic league appearances and goals

Rennie Harrison was a professional footballer who played once for Huddersfield Town in the Football League in the 1919–20 season. He played as a defender.

Harrison was born in 1897 in Burnley. He was the son of James Harrison, who was a builder by trade and a director of Burnley F.C. He signed with Huddersfield in November 1919.
