= Frederick Brock (footballer) =

English footballer

Personal information
- Full name: Frederick Brock
- Date of birth: 1901
- Place of birth: Huddersfield, England
- Position: Full back

Senior career*
Years	Team	Apps	(Gls)
1910–1911	Huddersfield Town	1	(0)
- * Club domestic league appearances and goals

Frederick Brock (born 1901) was an English professional footballer, who played as a defender for Huddersfield Town.
