= John Connor (footballer, born 1893) =

English footballer

Personal information
- Date of birth: 1893
- Place of birth: Durham, England
- Date of death: Unknown
- Position: Outside right

Senior career*
Years	Team	Apps	(Gls)
1914–1915	Huddersfield Town	3	(0)
- * Club domestic league appearances and goals

John Connor (born 1893) was an English professional footballer who played as an outside right for Huddersfield Town.
