= Sandy Doolan =

Scottish footballer

Personal information
- Full name: Alexander Doolan
- Date of birth: 7 August 1889
- Place of birth: Annbank, Scotland
- Date of death: 19 April 1937 (aged 47)
- Place of death: Goodmayes, England
- Height: 5 ft 11 1/2 in (1.82 m)
- Position: Left back

Senior career*
Years	Team	Apps	(Gls)
1907–1912	Kilmarnock	6	(0)
1912–1920	Bradford City	22	(0)
- Preston North End
- * Club domestic league appearances and goals

Alexander Doolan (7 August 1889 – 19 April 1937) was a Scottish professional footballer who played as a left back.

== Career ==
Born in Annbank, Doolan played for Kilmarnock, Bradford City and Preston North End.

For Bradford City he made 22 appearances in the Football League; he also made four appearances in the FA Cup.

== Honours ==
Preston North End

- FA Cup runner-up: 1921–22

== Sources ==
- Frost, Terry (1988). Bradford City A Complete Record 1903-1988. Breedon Books Sport. ISBN 0-907969-38-0.
