= Tony Arrowsmith =

English footballer (1887–1950)

Personal information
- Full name: John Thomas Arrowsmith
- Date of birth: 6 July 1887
- Place of birth: Staveley, West Riding of Yorkshire, England
- Date of death: 1950 (aged 62–63)
- Height: 5 ft 9 in (1.75 m)
- Position: Left back

Senior career*
Years	Team	Apps	(Gls)
- Anston United
- Anston Colliery
- Worksop Town
1911–1914	Grimsby Town	137	(0)
- * Club domestic league appearances and goals

John Thomas Arrowsmith (6 July 1887 – 1950) was a footballer who played in the Football League for Grimsby Town.
