= Dick Roberts (footballer, born 1891) =

Welsh footballer

Personal information
- Full name: Richard Edward Roberts
- Date of birth: 1891
- Place of birth: Rhyl, Wales
- Position: Left back

Senior career*
| Years | Team | Apps | (Gls) |
| –1910 | Rhyl United | | |
| 1910–1914 | Leeds City | 0 | (0) |
| 1914 | Rhyl Town | | |
| 1914–1919 | Coventry City | 37 | (1) |
| –1920 | Rhyl United | | |
| 1920–1922 | Nuneaton Town | | |
| –1929 | Atherstone Town | | |
- Barwell United
- * Club domestic league appearances and goals

Richard Edward Roberts was a Welsh professional footballer who played in the Football League for Coventry City as a left back.

== Personal life ==
Roberts' brothers Hugh and Albert were also footballers.

== Career statistics ==
Appearances and goals by club, season and competition
| Club | Season | League | | | FA Cup | | Total | |
| Club | Season | Division | Apps | Goals | Apps | Goals | Apps | Goals |
|---|---|---|---|---|---|---|---|---|
| Coventry City | 1914–15 | Southern League Second Division | 20 | 1 | 1 | 0 | 21 | 1 |
| Coventry City | 1919–20 | Second Division | 17 | 0 | 2 | 0 | 19 | 0 |
| Career total | | | 37 | 1 | 3 | 0 | 40 | 1 |

== Honours ==
Atherstone Town

- Lady Agnes Durham Cup: 1928–29
