= Percy Tompkin =

English footballer

Personal information
- Full name: Percy Lord Tompkin
- Date of birth: 28 January 1894
- Place of birth: Salford, England
- Date of death: 25 February 1948 (aged 54)
- Place of death: Countesthorpe, England
- Height: 5 ft 7 1/2 in (1.71 m)
- Position: Midfielder

Senior career*
Years	Team	Apps	(Gls)
1919–1920	Huddersfield Town	1	(0)
- Leicester City
- * Club domestic league appearances and goals

Percy Lord Tompkin (born 28 January 1894) was a professional footballer who played for Huddersfield Town and Leicester City.
