= William Wright (footballer, born 1893) =

English footballer

Personal information
- Full name: William Pountney Wright
- Date of birth: 1893
- Place of birth: Seaforth, England
- Date of death: 1945 (aged 51–52)
- Position: Centre forward

Senior career*
Years	Team	Apps	(Gls)
- Egremont
1914	Everton	2	(0)
- South Liverpool
1919	St Mirren	11	(1)
1919–1920	Tranmere Rovers		
1920	Exeter City	17	(9)
1920–1921	Huddersfield Town	9	(4)
- Mid Rhondda United
- Yeovil & Petters United
- * Club domestic league appearances and goals

William Pountney Wright (1893–1945) was an English professional footballer who played in the Football League for Exeter City, Huddersfield Town and Everton as a centre forward.

== Personal life ==
Wright served in the Merchant Navy during the First World War.

== Career statistics ==
Appearances and goals by club, season and competition
Club	Season	League			National Cup		Total	
Club	Season	Division	Apps	Goals	Apps	Goals	Apps	Goals
Everton	1914–15	First Division	2	0	0	0	2	0
St Mirren	1919–20	Scottish First Division	11	1	―		11	1
Career total			13	1	0	0	13	1
