= Sandy Mutch =

Scottish footballer (1884–1967)

Personal information
- Full name: Alexander Mutch
- Date of birth: 13 August 1884
- Place of birth: Inverurie, Scotland
- Date of death: 16 September 1967 (aged 82)
- Place of death: Newcastle upon Tyne, England
- Height: 5 ft 10 in (1.78 m)
- Position: Goalkeeper

Senior career*
Years	Team	Apps	(Gls)
1907–1910	Aberdeen	75	(0)
1910–1922	Huddersfield Town	229	(0)
1922–1924	Newcastle United	36	(0)
- * Club domestic league appearances and goals

Alexander "Sandy" Mutch (9 December 1884 – 16 September 1967) was a Scottish football goalkeeper.

== Playing career ==
Mutch was born in Inverurie, Aberdeenshire, Scotland, the sixth of twelve children of Alexander Mutch (1851–1938) and Ann Milne Birse (1856–1933). He began his football career with Aberdeen before playing for Huddersfield Town between 1910 and 1922, winning the FA Cup once and helping Huddersfield into the Football League First Division in 1920. While playing for Huddersfield, he played in two FA Cup Finals: 1920 where they lost 1–0 to Aston Villa after extra time, and in the 1922 Cup Final which they won 1–0 against Preston North End.

His Newcastle United debut was on 26 Aug 1922 against Everton, a home match. In 1924 he was in the team for the FA Cup Final again, (his third FA Cup Final in four years), but shortly before Newcastle's 2–0 victory over Aston Villa he suffered a bad knee injury which eventually led to his retirement as a player.

== Later career ==
Later at Newcastle United, he became the head groundsman at the club he loved so much until he left due to poor health.

The coaching and physiotherapy roles at Newcastle were held by his son, Alexander Pusey Mutch, who followed in his father's footsteps at the club but carved out his own legacy behind the scenes.

Sandy Mutch died of kidney failure in 1967.

== Honours ==
Huddersfield Town

- FA Cup: 1921–22; runner-up: 1919–20
- FA Charity Shield: 1922
- Football League Second Division runner-up: 1919–20
