= William McLaren (footballer) =

Scottish footballer

Personal information
- Full name: William McLaren
- Date of birth: 1887
- Place of birth: Fauldhouse, Scotland
- Date of death: Unknown
- Position: Wing half

Senior career*
Years	Team	Apps	(Gls)
- Duntocher Hibernian
1907–1910	Cowdenbeath	54	(0)
1910–1913	Burnley	63	(0)
1913–1915	Huddersfield Town	31	(2)
- Cowdenbeath
- * Club domestic league appearances and goals

William McLaren (born in Fauldhouse, Scotland) was a professional footballer who played for Cowdenbeath, Burnley and Huddersfield Town.
