= George Richardson (footballer, born 1891) =

English footballer (1891–1969)

Personal information
- Full name: George Edward Holland Richardson
- Date of birth: 4 December 1891
- Place of birth: Seaham, County Durham, England
- Date of death: 25 April 1969 (aged 77)
- Place of death: Huddersfield, Yorkshire, England
- Height: 5 ft 6 1/2 in (1.69 m)
- Position: Midfielder

Senior career*
Years	Team	Apps	(Gls)
1914–1924	Huddersfield Town	110	(7)
- Hull City
- * Club domestic league appearances and goals

George Edward Holland Richardson (4 December 1891 – 25 April 1969) was an English professional footballer, who played for Huddersfield Town and Hull City. While at Huddersfield he won the 1921–22 FA Cup and the 1922 FA Charity Shield.

== Honours ==
Huddersfield Town

- FA Cup: 1921–22; runner-up: 1919–20
