= Charlie Slade =

English footballer and manager

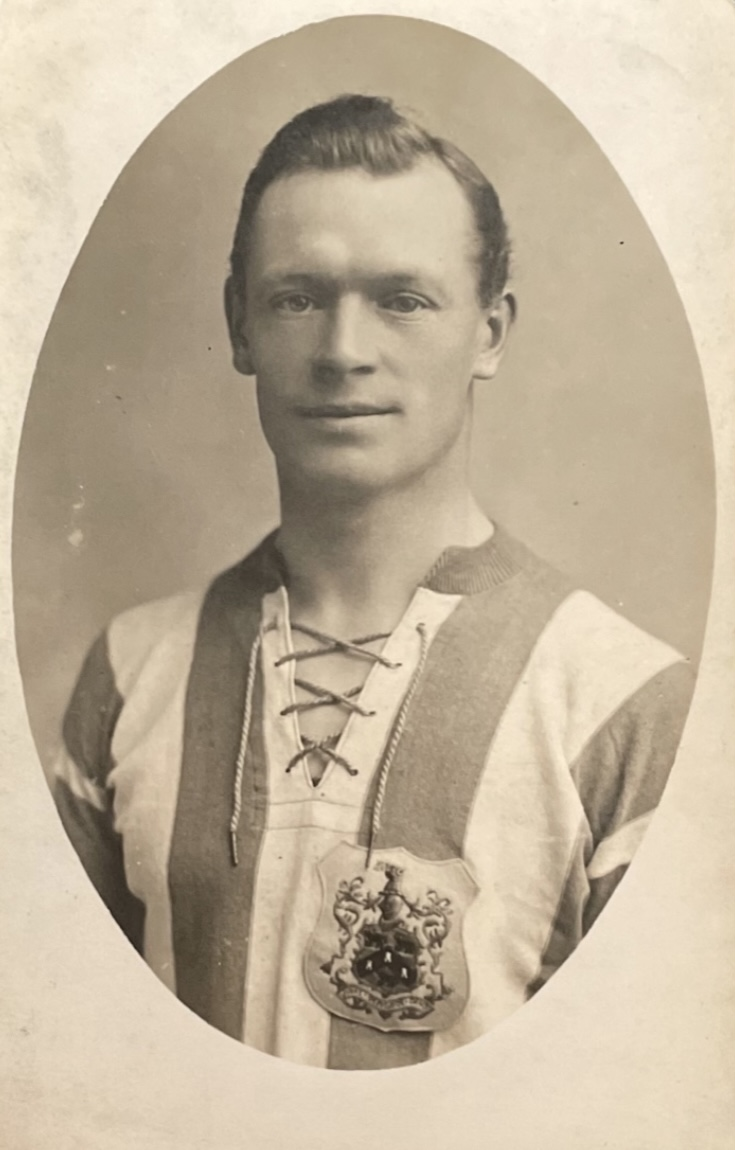

Personal information
- Full name: Charles Howard Slade
- Date of birth: 29 January 1891
- Place of birth: Bristol, England
- Date of death: 7 April 1971 (aged 80)
- Place of death: Doncaster, England
- Height: 5 ft 7 in (1.70 m)
- Position: Midfielder

Youth career
- Bath City
- Stourbridge

Senior career*
| Years | Team | Apps | (Gls) |
| 1913–1914 | Aston Villa | 3 | (0) |
| 1914–1923 | Huddersfield Town | 111 | (6) |
| 1923–1925 | Middlesbrough | 68 | (2) |
| 1925–1927 | Darlington | 23 | (0) |
| 1927–1929 | Folkestone | | |

Managerial career
- 1935-1936: Real Betis
- 1944–1946: Beşiktaş JK
- 1950–1951: Crystal Palace (Joint manager with Fred Dawes)
- * Club domestic league appearances and goals

Charles Howard Slade (29 January 1891 – 7 April 1971) was a professional footballer, who played for Aston Villa, Huddersfield Town, Middlesbrough and Darlington. While at Huddersfield he won the 1921–22 FA Cup and the 1922 FA Charity Shield.

Slade was working as a scout for Crystal Palace when manager Ronnie Rooke resigned, in 1950. Palace appointed Slade as joint-manager with long-serving player, and Rooke's assistant, Fred Dawes. However the club had a poor 1950–51 season and early into the next campaign Dawes and Slade were removed from their positions.

Slade reverted to his position as a scout and remained with Palace until 1955.

== Honours ==
Huddersfield Town

- FA Cup: 1921–22; runner-up: 1919–20
