= Frank Mann (footballer) =

English footballer

Personal information
- Full name: Frank Drury Mann
- Date of birth: 17 March 1891
- Place of birth: Nottingham, England
- Date of death: July 1966 (aged 75)
- Height: 5 ft 7 1/2 in (1.71 m)
- Positions: Forward; half-back

Senior career*
Years	Team	Apps	(Gls)
- Aston Villa
1912–1923	Huddersfield Town	201	(68)
	Manchester City	0	(0)
1923–1930	Manchester United	180	(5)
- * Club domestic league appearances and goals

Frank Drury Mann (17 March 1891 - July 1966) was an English football half back. In his early days, he played for Aston Villa, Huddersfield Town and Manchester City. While at Huddersfield he won the 1921–22 FA Cup and the 1922 FA Charity Shield. In March 1923, he was sold to Manchester United. He stayed with United until 1930 when he retired from playing professionally. He continued playing non-league football for a while with Mossley.

During his United career, he made 197 appearances and scored five goals. He helped them win promotion to the First Division in 1926. He played for them until the age of 39, making him one of the oldest players ever to play for the club.

He made seven appearances for Mossley scoring one goal in the 1930–31 season.

== Honours ==
Huddersfield Town

- FA Cup: 1921–22; runner-up: 1919–20
