= James Wood (footballer) =

English footballer (1893–??)

Personal information
- Full name: James William Wood
- Date of birth: 8 March 1893
- Place of birth: Sunderland, England
- Date of death: Unknown
- Height: 5 ft 7 in (1.70 m)
- Position: Defender

Senior career*
Years	Team	Apps	(Gls)
- South Shields
1914–1923	Huddersfield Town	127	(0)
1922–1925	Blackpool	55	(0)
- * Club domestic league appearances and goals

James William Wood (born 8 March 1893) was a professional footballer, who played for South Shields, Huddersfield Town and Blackpool. While at Huddersfield he won the 1921–22 FA Cup and the 1922 FA Charity Shield.

== Honours ==
Huddersfield Town

- FA Cup: 1921–22; runner-up: 1919–20
