= Arthur Fairclough (football manager) =

English football manager

- Arthur Fairclough

Personal information
- Date of birth: 23 March 1874
- Place of birth: Barnsley, England
- Date of death: 19 March 1947 (aged 72)
- Place of death: Sheffield, England

Managerial career
- Years: Team
- 1898–1901: Barnsley
- 1904–1912: Barnsley
- 1912–1919: Huddersfield Town
- 1920–1927: Leeds United
- 1929–1930: Barnsley

Arthur Fairclough (23 March 1874 - 19 March 1947) was the manager of Barnsley, Huddersfield Town, and Leeds United. He won the FA Cup with Barnsley and the Football League Second Division with Leeds United.

He started his managerial career with Barnsley, being there between 1898 until 1901. He was replaced by John McCartney until 1904, when he came back as manager until 1912, and won the FA Cup with them in his last season in charge (of his 2nd spell). After his success at Barnsley, he was persuaded to join Huddersfield where he laid the groundwork for the success to be achieved by Herbert Chapman. When Huddersfield chairman Hilton Crowther decided that a Leeds-based team would be a better vehicle for his attentions, he persuaded his manager to move with him, and so Fairclough took over from Dick Ray as Leeds United manager for the club's first full season in the Football League. Fairclough put together a useful team, and in 1923-24 he saw his side win promotion to the First Division. The following year saw the signing of the goal-scoring talents of Tom Jennings and Russell Wainscoat, to stand alongside the defensive abilities of Ernest Hart and Tom Townsley. Despite Jennings astonishing haul of 35 goals in 42 games, 1926-27 saw the side relegated and Fairclough resigned in the close season. He briefly returned to management with Barnsley in 1929, but resigned after a year in the job. Though a resident of Barnsley (at 105 Dodworth Road), Fairclough died at Claremont Nursing Home in Sheffield in early 1947. He was buried in Barnsley Cemetery (Plot B 101).
