= 1921–22 FA Cup =

Tournament details
- Country: England; Wales

Final positions
- Champions: Huddersfield Town (1st title)
- Runners-up: Preston North End

The 1921–22 FA Cup was the 47th season of the world's oldest association football competition, the Football Association Challenge Cup (more usually known as the FA Cup). Huddersfield Town won the competition, beating Preston North End 1–0 in the final at Stamford Bridge, London.

Matches were scheduled to be played at the stadium of the team named first on the date specified for each round, which was always a Saturday. If scores were level after 90 minutes had been played, a replay would take place at the stadium of the second-named team later the same week. If the replayed match was drawn further replays would be held at neutral venues until a winner was determined. If scores were level after 90 minutes had been played in a replay, a 30-minute period of extra time would be played.

== Calendar ==
The format of the FA Cup for the season had two preliminary rounds, six qualifying rounds, four proper rounds, and the semi-finals and final.

Round	Date
Extra preliminary round	Saturday 10 September 1921
Preliminary round	Saturday 24 September 1921
First round qualifying	Saturday 8 October 1921
Second round qualifying	Saturday 22 October 1921
Third round qualifying	Saturday 5 November 1921
Fourth round qualifying	Saturday 19 November 1921
Fifth round qualifying	Saturday 3 December 1921
Sixth round qualifying	Saturday 17 December 1921
First round proper	Saturday 7 January 1922
Second round proper	Saturday 28 January 1922
Third round proper	Saturday 18 February 1922
Fourth round proper	Saturday 4 March 1922
Semi-finals	Saturday 25 March 1922
Final	Saturday 29 April 1922

== Qualifying rounds ==
As generally expected, the Football League added another 20 teams to the Third Division this season and split that competition into separate North and South components. 18 of the new clubs joined Grimsby Town and the relegated Stockport County in the northern section, while Aberdare Athletic and Charlton Athletic joined those remaining (minus the promoted Crystal Palace) in the south. This significant expansion of the Football League meant that 31 of its clubs would be entering the FA Cup in the qualifying rounds.

In the end, the 11 League sides winning through to the first round proper from the sixth qualifying round were Darlington, Walsall, Newport County, Brentford, Norwich City, Gillingham, Southport, Ashington, Northampton Town, Swansea Town and Grimsby Town. Although they had entered the Cup sporadically since 1888–89, Ashington was appearing in the main competition for the first time.

The only non-league club to progress from the qualifiers was Worksop Town.

North Eastern League side Shildon was the most successful of the 328 clubs entered in the extra preliminary round this season. Enjoying victories over traditional powerhouse outfits from their region in Tow Law Town, Crook Town, Blyth Spartans and Bishop Auckland, the Railwaymen progressed to the sixth qualifying round before being knocked out of the tournament by Brentford.

For all qualifying round results, see 1921–22 FA Cup qualifying rounds.

== First round proper ==
The 12 qualifiers and 41 of 44 First and Second Division League clubs joined the competition in this round. First Division side Birmingham famously had their entry rejected after they failed to submit the relevant paperwork, while Coventry City and Rotherham County from the Second Division were entered in the fifth qualifying round, but drawn against each other, with Coventry emerging victorious.

Of the Third South clubs, Aberdare Athletic and Charlton Athletic were entered in the extra preliminary round (although Charlton did not play), while nine sides (Brentford, Bristol Rovers, Exeter City, Gllingham, Merthyr Town, Newport County, Northampton Town, Norwich City and Swansea Town) were entered in the fifth qualifying round. The eleven others were given byes to the first round proper. These were:

- Watford
- Brighton & Hove Albion
- Luton Town
- Swindon Town
- Queens Park Rangers
- Millwall
- Plymouth Argyle
- Southampton
- Portsmouth
- Southend United
- Reading

Of the Third North clubs, Halifax Town and Wigan Borough took no part in the competition. Eight sides (Accrington Stanley, Ashington, Barrow, Chesterfield, Crewe Alexandra, Tranmere Rovers, Walsall and Wrexham) were entered in the fourth qualifying round with the rest joining in the fifth qualifying round.

32 matches were scheduled to be played on Saturday, 7 January 1922. Eleven matches were drawn and went to replays in the following midweek fixture, of which one went to another replay.

Tie no	Home team	Score	Away team	Date
1	Blackpool	1–2	Watford	7 January 1922
2	Bristol City	0–0	Nottingham Forest	7 January 1922
Replay	Nottingham Forest	3–1	Bristol City	11 January 1922
3	Burnley	2–2	Huddersfield Town	7 January 1922
Replay	Huddersfield Town	3–2	Burnley	11 January 1922
4	Preston North End	3–0	Wolverhampton Wanderers	7 January 1922
5	Southampton	3–1	South Shields	7 January 1922
6	Walsall	3–3	Bradford City	7 January 1922
Replay	Bradford City	4–0	Walsall	11 January 1922
7	Gillingham	1–3	Oldham Athletic	7 January 1922
8	Leicester City	2–0	Clapton Orient	7 January 1922
9	Blackburn Rovers	1–1	Southport	7 January 1922
Replay	Southport	0–2	Blackburn Rovers	11 January 1922
10	Aston Villa	6–1	Derby County	7 January 1922
11	Bolton Wanderers	1–0	Bury	7 January 1922
12	Grimsby Town	1–1	Notts County	7 January 1922
Replay	Notts County	3–0	Grimsby Town	12 January 1922
13	Sunderland	1–1	Liverpool	7 January 1922
Replay	Liverpool	5–0	Sunderland	11 January 1922
14	Everton	0–6	Crystal Palace	7 January 1922
15	Swindon Town	2–1	Leeds United	7 January 1922
16	Newcastle United	6–0	Newport County	7 January 1922
17	Worksop Town	1–2	Southend United	7 January 1922
18	Manchester City	3–1	Darlington	7 January 1922
19	Barnsley	1–1	Norwich City	7 January 1922
Replay	Norwich City	1–2	Barnsley	12 January 1922
20	Brentford	0–2	Tottenham Hotspur	7 January 1922
21	Northampton Town	3–0	Reading	7 January 1922
22	Portsmouth	1–1	Luton Town	7 January 1922
Replay	Luton Town	2–1	Portsmouth	11 January 1922
23	Brighton & Hove Albion	1–0	Sheffield United	7 January 1922
24	Manchester United	1–4	Cardiff City	7 January 1922
25	Plymouth Argyle	1–1	Fulham	7 January 1922
Replay	Fulham	1–0	Plymouth Argyle	11 January 1922
26	Millwall	4–2	Ashington	7 January 1922
27	Hull City	5–0	Middlesbrough	7 January 1922
28	Chelsea	2–4	West Bromwich Albion	7 January 1922
29	Bradford Park Avenue	1–0	The Wednesday	7 January 1922
30	Port Vale	2–4	Stoke	7 January 1922
31	Swansea Town	0–0	West Ham United	7 January 1922
Replay	West Ham United	1–1	Swansea Town	11 January 1922
Replay	Swansea Town	1–0	West Ham United	16 January 1922
32	Arsenal	0–0	Queens Park Rangers	7 January 1922
Replay	Queens Park Rangers	1–2	Arsenal	11 January 1922

== Second round proper ==
The 16 Second Round matches were played on Saturday, 28 January 1922. Five matches were drawn, with replays taking place in the following midweek fixture. One of these, the Bradford City–Notts County match, went to a second replay.

Tie no	Home team	Score	Away team	Date
1	Liverpool	0–1	West Bromwich Albion	28 January 1922
2	Preston North End	3–1	Newcastle United	28 January 1922
3	Southampton	1–1	Cardiff City	28 January 1922
Replay	Cardiff City	2–0	Southampton	1 February 1922
4	Leicester City	2–0	Fulham	28 January 1922
5	Nottingham Forest	3–0	Hull City	28 January 1922
6	Aston Villa	1–0	Luton Town	28 January 1922
7	Bolton Wanderers	1–3	Manchester City	28 January 1922
8	Swindon Town	0–1	Blackburn Rovers	28 January 1922
9	Tottenham Hotspur	1–0	Watford	28 January 1922
10	Barnsley	3–1	Oldham Athletic	28 January 1922
11	Northampton Town	2–2	Stoke	28 January 1922
Replay	Stoke	3–0	Northampton Town	1 February 1922
12	Brighton & Hove Albion	0–0	Huddersfield Town	28 January 1922
Replay	Huddersfield Town	2–0	Brighton & Hove Albion	1 February 1922
13	Bradford City	1–1	Notts County	28 January 1922
Replay	Notts County	0–0	Bradford City	1 February 1922
Replay	Notts County	1–0	Bradford City	6 February 1922
14	Crystal Palace	0–0	Millwall	28 January 1922
Replay	Millwall	2–0	Crystal Palace	1 February 1922
15	Southend United	0–1	Swansea Town	28 January 1922
16	Bradford Park Avenue	2–3	Arsenal	28 January 1922

== Third round proper ==
The eight Third Round matches were scheduled for Saturday, 18 February 1922. Four matches were drawn and went to replays in the following midweek fixture.

Tie no	Home team	Score	Away team	Date
1	Stoke	0–0	Aston Villa	18 February 1922
Replay	Aston Villa	4–0	Stoke	22 February 1922
2	Blackburn Rovers	1–1	Huddersfield Town	18 February 1922
Replay	Huddersfield Town	5–0	Blackburn Rovers	22 February 1922
3	West Bromwich Albion	1–1	Notts County	18 February 1922
Replay	Notts County	2–0	West Bromwich Albion	22 February 1922
4	Tottenham Hotspur	2–1	Manchester City	18 February 1922
5	Barnsley	1–1	Preston North End	18 February 1922
Replay	Preston North End	3–0	Barnsley	22 February 1922
6	Millwall	4–0	Swansea Town	18 February 1922
7	Cardiff City	4–1	Nottingham Forest	18 February 1922
8	Arsenal	3–0	Leicester City	18 February 1922

== Fourth round proper ==
The four Fourth round matches were scheduled for Saturday, 4 March 1922. There were three replays, each played in the following midweek fixture.

Tie no	Home team	Score	Away team	Date
1	Notts County	2–2	Aston Villa	4 March 1922
Replay	Aston Villa	3–4	Notts County	8 March 1922
2	Huddersfield Town	3–0	Millwall Athletic	4 March 1922
3	Cardiff City	1–1	Tottenham Hotspur	4 March 1922
Replay	Tottenham Hotspur	2–1	Cardiff City	8 March 1922
4	Arsenal	1–1	Preston North End	4 March 1922
Replay	Preston North End	2–1	Arsenal	8 March 1922

== Semi-finals ==
The semi-final matches were played on Saturday, 25 March 1922. The matches ended in victories for Preston North End and Huddersfield Town, who went on to meet in the final at Wembley.

25 March 1922
15:00

Preston North End	2–1	Tottenham Hotspur

Hillsborough, Sheffield

25 March 1922
15:00

Huddersfield Town	3–1	Notts County

Turf Moor, Burnley

== Final ==
The Final was contested by Huddersfield Town and Preston North End at Stamford Bridge. Huddersfield won by a single goal, a penalty scored by Billy Smith.

=== Match details ===
29 April 1922
15:00 BST

Huddersfield Town	1 – 0	Preston North End
Smith 67' (pen.)	Report

Stamford Bridge, London
Attendance: 53,000
Referee: J. W. D. Fowler

Huddersfield Town	Preston North End

== See also ==
- FA Cup Final Results 1872-
