= 1928–29 Huddersfield Town A.F.C. season =

Huddersfield Town
1928–29 season
- Chairman: Sir Amos Brook Hirst
- Manager: Jack Chaplin
- Stadium: Leeds Road
- Football League First Division: 16th
- FA Cup: Semi-finals (eliminated by Bolton Wanderers)
- Top goalscorer: League: George Brown (15); All: George Brown (23)
- Highest home attendance: 53,700 vs Leeds United (26 January 1929)
- Lowest home attendance: 3,997 vs Liverpool (10 April 1929)
- Biggest win: 7–1 vs Burnley (10 November 1928); 7–1 vs Chesterfield (12 January 1929)
- Biggest defeat: 1–4 vs Sunderland (13 October 1928); 1–4 vs Newcastle United (3 November 1928); 1–4 vs Leicester City (15 December 1928); 1–4 vs Aston Villa (20 April 1929)

Huddersfield Town's 1928–29 campaign was a season that saw Town fall from grace, finishing down in 16th place, a far cry from their top 2 finishes in the past 5 seasons. They did manage to reach the semi-finals of the FA Cup, but it didn't stop Jack Chaplin losing his job at the end of the season.

== Squad at the start of the season ==
Note: Flags indicate national team as defined under FIFA eligibility rules; some limited exceptions apply. Players may hold more than one non-FIFA nationality.

Pos.	Nation	Player
GK	ENG	Hugh Turner
DF	ENG	Ned Barkas
DF	SCO	Willie Campbell
DF	ENG	Billy Carr
DF	WAL	Dai Evans
DF	ENG	Billy Fogg
DF	ENG	Roy Goodall
DF	ENG	Tommy Meads
DF	ENG	Bill Pickering
DF	ENG	Levi Redfern
DF	ENG	Bon Spence
DF	SCO	David Steele

Pos.	Nation	Player
DF	ENG	Sam Wadsworth
DF	ENG	Tom Wilson
MF	EIR	Laurie Cumming
MF	SCO	Alex Jackson
MF	ENG	Jimmy Smailes
MF	ENG	Billy Smith
FW	ENG	George Brown
FW	ENG	Johnny Dent
FW	ENG	Bob Kelly
FW	ENG	Harry Raw
FW	ENG	Clem Stephenson

== Squad at the end of the season ==
Note: Flags indicate national team as defined under FIFA eligibility rules; some limited exceptions apply. Players may hold more than one non-FIFA nationality.

Pos.	Nation	Player
GK	ENG	Hugh Turner
DF	ENG	Billy Carr
DF	WAL	Dai Evans
DF	ENG	Billy Fogg
DF	ENG	Roy Goodall
DF	ENG	Jimmy Naylor
DF	ENG	Bill Pickering
DF	ENG	Levi Redfern
DF	ENG	George Roughton
DF	ENG	Bon Spence
DF	SCO	David Steele
DF	ENG	Sam Wadsworth

Pos.	Nation	Player
DF	ENG	Tom Wilson
MF	EIR	Laurie Cumming
MF	SCO	Alex Jackson
MF	ENG	Jimmy Smailes
MF	ENG	Billy Smith
FW	ENG	George Brown
FW	ENG	Johnny Dent
FW	ENG	Bob Kelly
FW	WAL	Wilf Lewis
FW	ENG	Harry Raw
FW	ENG	Clem Stephenson

== Results ==
=== Division One ===
Date	Opponents	Home/ Away	Result F - A	Scorers	Attendance	Position
25 August 1928	Portsmouth	A	0–1		33,475	20th
27 August 1928	Bolton Wanderers	H	4–1	Goodall (pen), Raw, Kelly, Smith	15,710	8th
1 September 1928	Birmingham	H	0–0		19,871	9th
3 September 1928	Bolton Wanderers	A	1–1	Stephenson	15,532	7th
8 September 1928	Manchester City	A	2–3	Brown (2)	34,421	10th
15 September 1928	Leeds United	H	6–1	Brown (2), Stephenson, Smith, Goodall (pen), Jackson	39,869	9th
22 September 1928	Everton	H	3–1	Kelly, Brown, Smith	24,425	4th
29 September 1928	Arsenal	A	0–2		39,938	10th
6 October 1928	Blackburn Rovers	H	0–2		18,261	14th
13 October 1928	Sunderland	A	1–4	Jackson	33,783	16th
20 October 1928	Liverpool	A	3–2	Stephenson, Dent (2)	35,206	12th
27 October 1928	Manchester United	H	1–2	Stephenson	13,648	15th
3 November 1928	Newcastle United	A	1–4	Goodall (pen)	38,620	18th
10 November 1928	Burnley	H	7–1	Kelly, Jackson (3), Lewis (2), Cumming	12,645	16th
17 November 1928	Cardiff City	A	0–0		13,845	16th
24 November 1928	Sheffield United	H	6–1	Jackson (3), Dent, Cumming (2)	7,590	14th
1 December 1928	Bury	A	1–2	Kelly	15,469	14th
8 December 1928	Aston Villa	H	3–0	Dent (2), Kelly	16,406	14th
15 December 1928	Leicester City	A	1–4	Jackson	19,528	14th
22 December 1928	West Ham United	H	4–0	Jackson (3), Smith	11,509	12th
25 December 1928	Derby County	H	0–0		26,709	12th
26 December 1928	Derby County	A	2–1	Brown (2)	30,651	11th
29 December 1928	Portsmouth	H	3–1	Jackson, Brown (2)	15,208	9th
1 January 1929	Sheffield Wednesday	A	1–1	Cumming	57,143	9th
5 January 1929	Birmingham	A	2–1	Kelly, Brown	20,042	6th
19 January 1929	Manchester City	H	2–2	Cumming, Smailes	17,602	6th
2 February 1929	Everton	A	3–0	Naylor, Brown, Raw	25,044	6th
9 February 1929	Arsenal	H	0–1		14,697	8th
23 February 1929	Sunderland	H	1–2	Dent	13,258	9th
9 March 1929	Manchester United	A	0–1		28,183	11th
16 March 1929	Newcastle United	H	2–1	Brown, Dent	16,411	11th
30 March 1929	Cardiff City	H	1–1	Cumming	13,332	13th
1 April 1929	Blackburn Rovers	A	1–1	Raw	14,335	14th
2 April 1929	Sheffield Wednesday	H	0–0		32,555	13th
6 April 1929	Sheffield United	A	0–1		24,458	13th
10 April 1929	Liverpool	H	1–3	Raw	3,997	14th
13 April 1929	Bury	H	0–2		8,609	16th
16 April 1929	Burnley	A	2–3	Brown, Smith	15,426	16th
20 April 1929	Aston Villa	A	1–4	Brown	24,821	18th
27 April 1929	Leicester City	H	1–1	Brown	8,778	18th
1 May 1929	Leeds United	A	2–1	Dent, Jackson	17,291	15th
4 May 1929	West Ham United	A	1–1	Dent	13,005	16th

=== FA Cup ===
Date	Round	Opponents	Home/ Away	Result F - A	Scorers	Attendance
12 January 1929	Round 3	Chesterfield	A	7–1	Brown (4), Jackson, Cumming (2)	15,923
26 January 1929	Round 4	Leeds United	H	3–0	Smith, Jackson (2)	53,700
16 February 1929	Round 5	Crystal Palace	H	5–2	Smith, Brown (3), Kelly	19,000
2 March 1929	Round 6	West Bromwich Albion	A	1–1	Brown	52,333
6 March 1929	Round 6 Replay	West Bromwich Albion	H	2–1	Jackson, Kelly	39,101
23 March 1929	Semi-Final	Bolton Wanderers	N	1–3	Jackson	39,000

== Appearances and goals ==
Name	Nationality	Position	League		FA Cup		Total	
Name	Nationality	Position	Apps	Goals	Apps	Goals	Apps	Goals
Ned Barkas	England	DF	6	0	0	0	6	0
George Brown	England	FW	28	15	6	8	34	23
Willie Campbell	Scotland	DF	1	0	0	0	1	0
Billy Carr	England	DF	3	0	0	0	3	0
Laurie Cumming	Ireland	FW	17	6	2	2	19	8
Johnny Dent	England	FW	21	9	3	0	24	9
Dai Evans	Wales	DF	18	0	1	0	19	0
Billy Fogg	England	DF	4	0	0	0	4	0
Roy Goodall	England	DF	42	3	5	0	47	3
Alex Jackson	Scotland	FW	35	14	6	5	41	19
Bob Kelly	England	FW	32	6	6	2	38	8
Wilf Lewis	Wales	FW	2	2	0	0	2	2
Tommy Meads	England	DF	3	0	0	0	3	0
Jimmy Naylor	England	DF	22	1	6	0	28	1
Bill Pickering	England	DF	0	0	1	0	1	0
Harry Raw	England	FW	16	4	1	0	17	4
Levi Redfern	England	DF	9	0	3	0	12	0
George Roughton	England	DF	2	0	0	0	2	0
Jimmy Smailes	England	MF	10	1	0	0	10	1
Billy Smith	England	MF	32	5	6	2	38	7
Bon Spence	England	DF	13	0	0	0	13	0
David Steele	Scotland	DF	21	0	2	0	23	0
Clem Stephenson	England	FW	12	4	0	0	12	4
Hugh Turner	England	GK	42	0	6	0	48	0
Sam Wadsworth	England	DF	34	0	6	0	40	0
Tom Wilson	England	DF	37	0	6	0	43	0
