= 1927–28 Huddersfield Town A.F.C. season =

Huddersfield Town
1927–28 season
- Chairman: Sir Amos Brook Hirst
- Manager: Jack Chaplin
- Stadium: Leeds Road
- Football League First Division: 2nd
- FA Cup: Runners-Up (eliminated by Blackburn Rovers)
- Top goalscorer: League: George Brown (27); All: George Brown (35)
- Highest home attendance: 55,200 vs Middlesbrough (18 February 1928)
- Lowest home attendance: 7,098 vs Derby County (5 November 1927)
- Biggest win: 8–2 vs Cardiff City (1 October 1927); 7–1 vs Sheffield United (12 November 1927)
- Biggest defeat: 0–4 vs Cardiff City (11 February 1928)

Huddersfield Town's 1927–28 campaign was the last season of Town's true dominance of English football. They finished 2nd behind Everton, although if they had won all their last 3 games, they would have won the title, but they only beat Portsmouth and lost to Sheffield United and Aston Villa. They also reached their 3rd FA Cup Final, losing to Blackburn Rovers in controversial circumstances.

== Squad at the start of season ==
Note: Flags indicate national team as defined under FIFA eligibility rules; some limited exceptions apply. Players may hold more than one non-FIFA nationality.

Pos.	Nation	Player
GK	ENG	Billy Mercer
GK	ENG	Hugh Turner
DF	ENG	Ned Barkas
DF	ENG	Billy Carr
DF	ENG	Roy Goodall
DF	ENG	Tommy Meads
DF	ENG	Levi Redfern
DF	ENG	Norman Smith
DF	ENG	Bon Spence
DF	SCO	David Steele

Pos.	Nation	Player
DF	ENG	Sam Wadsworth
DF	ENG	Tom Wilson
MF	EIR	Laurie Cumming
MF	SCO	Alex Jackson
MF	ENG	Billy Smith
FW	ENG	George Brown
FW	ENG	Johnny Dent
FW	ENG	Bob Kelly
FW	ENG	Harry Raw
FW	ENG	Clem Stephenson

== Review ==
Town had just one season after relinquishing their championship title, but they were still a formidable force in the 1st Division. This was proven by their record 8–2 win over Cardiff City in October and the 7–1 win over Sheffield United in November. George Brown still continued his goalscoring exploits by scoring 35 goals during the season, including 27 in the league. They were still in the hunt for the title until late April. They needed to win their last 3 games to have a realistic chance of reclaiming their title, but defeats to Sheffield United and Aston Villa made the win over Portsmouth irrelevant. They missed out on the championship by 2 points to Everton.

== Squad at the end of the season ==
Note: Flags indicate national team as defined under FIFA eligibility rules; some limited exceptions apply. Players may hold more than one non-FIFA nationality.

Pos.	Nation	Player
GK	ENG	Billy Mercer
GK	ENG	Hugh Turner
DF	ENG	Ned Barkas
DF	SCO	Willie Campbell
DF	ENG	Billy Carr
DF	ENG	Roy Goodall
DF	ENG	Tommy Meads
DF	ENG	Bill Pickering
DF	ENG	Levi Redfern
DF	ENG	Bon Spence
DF	SCO	David Steele
DF	ENG	Sam Wadsworth

Pos.	Nation	Player
DF	ENG	Tom Wilson
MF	EIR	Laurie Cumming
MF	SCO	Alex Jackson
MF	ENG	Jimmy Smailes
MF	ENG	Billy Smith
MF	SCO	George Wilson
FW	ENG	George Brown
FW	ENG	Johnny Dent
FW	ENG	Bob Kelly
FW	ENG	Harry Raw
FW	ENG	Clem Stephenson

== Results ==
=== Division One ===
Date	Opponents	Home/ Away	Result F - A	Scorers	Attendance	Position
27 August 1927	Newcastle United	H	1 - 3	Brown	24,465	17th
29 August 1927	Birmingham	A	1 - 3	Brown	16,432	18th
3 September 1927	West Ham United	A	2 - 4	Brown, Jackson	23,925	22nd
10 September 1927	Tottenham Hotspur	A	2 - 2	Dent, Brown	27,983	21st
17 September 1927	Manchester United	H	4 - 2	Brown (3), Dent	17,307	20th
24 September 1927	Everton	A	2 - 2	B. Smith, Jackson	37,269	20th
1 October 1927	Cardiff City	H	8 - 2	Kelly (3), Jackson, Dent (2), Goodall (pen), B. Smith	12,975	16th
8 October 1927	Blackburn Rovers	A	1 - 1	Jackson	28,032	16th
15 October 1927	Bolton Wanderers	H	1 - 0	Jackson (pen)	19,818	11th
22 October 1927	Aston Villa	H	1 - 1	Jackson	14,679	12th
29 October 1927	Sunderland	A	0 - 3		22,070	16th
5 November 1927	Derby County	H	2 - 1	B. Smith, Goodall (pen)	7,098	15th
12 November 1927	Sheffield United	A	7 - 1	Meads, B. Smith (2), Brown (2), Jackson (2)	22,163	13th
19 November 1927	Bury	H	3 - 0	Brown (2), B. Smith	12,273	9th
26 November 1927	Liverpool	A	2 - 4	B. Smith, Goodall (pen)	34,128	11th
3 December 1927	Arsenal	H	2 - 1	B. Smith (2)	15,140	7th
10 December 1927	Burnley	A	1 - 0	Brown	19,130	5th
17 December 1927	Leicester City	H	3 - 1	Brown (2), Kelly	13,717	3rd
24 December 1927	Portsmouth	A	1 - 2	Brown	21,785	5th
26 December 1927	Sheffield Wednesday	H	1 - 0	Jackson	21,336	4th
27 December 1927	Sheffield Wednesday	A	5 - 0	Barkas (pen), B. Smith, Brown (3)	41,824	2nd
31 December 1927	Newcastle United	A	3 - 2	Brown, Jackson, Barkas (pen)	33,640	2nd
2 January 1928	Middlesbrough	A	1 - 3	Brown	26,032	2nd
7 January 1928	West Ham United	H	5 - 2	Jackson (2), Brown (3)	10,972	2nd
21 January 1928	Tottenham Hotspur	H	4 - 2	Brown, B. Smith (2), Jackson	17,892	2nd
4 February 1928	Everton	H	4 - 1	Dent, B. Smith (3)	51,284	2nd
11 February 1928	Cardiff City	A	0 - 4		21,073	2nd
25 February 1928	Bolton Wanderers	A	1 - 0	B. Smith	44,082	2nd
7 March 1928	Manchester United	A	0 - 0		35,413	2nd
10 March 1928	Sunderland	H	4 - 2	Stephenson, Jackson, Kelly, Brown	17,497	1st
14 March 1928	Blackburn Rovers	H	3 - 1	Goodall (pen), Jackson, Brown	10,890	1st
17 March 1928	Derby County	A	0 - 0		24,684	1st
31 March 1928	Bury	A	3 - 2	G. Wilson, Raw, Dent	14,636	1st
7 April 1928	Liverpool	H	2 - 4	Jackson, Brown	27,290	2nd
9 April 1928	Birmingham	H	2 - 0	Dent (2)	28,779	1st
10 April 1928	Middlesbrough	H	2 - 4	Stephenson, Goodall (pen)	29,034	1st
14 April 1928	Arsenal	A	0 - 0		38,707	1st
25 April 1928	Burnley	H	1 - 2	Brown	20,643	2nd
28 April 1928	Leicester City	A	2 - 1	Raw, Barkas (pen)	29,191	2nd
30 April 1928	Sheffield United	H	0 - 1		22,380	2nd
2 May 1928	Aston Villa	A	0 - 3		30,173	2nd
5 May 1928	Portsmouth	H	4 - 1	Jackson (2), B. Smith, Barkas	11,706	2nd

=== FA Cup ===
Date	Round	Opponents	Home/ Away	Result F - A	Scorers	Attendance
14 January 1928	Round 3	Lincoln City	H	4 - 2	Brown, B. Smith, Goodall (pen), Steele	19,329
28 January 1928	Round 4	West Ham United	H	2 - 1	Brown, Jackson	27,525
18 February 1928	Round 5	Middlesbrough	H	4 - 0	Steele, Brown, Jackson, B. Smith	55,200
3 March 1928	Round 6	Tottenham Hotspur	H	6 - 1	B. Smith (2), Brown (4)	52,390
24 March 1928	Semi-Final	Sheffield United	N	2 - 2	Jackson, Brown	69,260
26 March 1928	Semi-Final Replay	Sheffield United	N	0 - 0		53,749
2 April 1928	Semi-Final 2nd Replay	Sheffield United	N	1 - 0	Jackson	69,370
21 April 1928	Final	Blackburn Rovers	N	1 - 3	Jackson	92,041

== Appearances and goals ==
Name	Nationality	Position	League		FA Cup		Total	
Name	Nationality	Position	Apps	Goals	Apps	Goals	Apps	Goals
Ned Barkas	England	DF	36	4	4	0	40	4
George Brown	England	FW	32	27	6	8	38	35
Willie Campbell	Scotland	DF	2	0	0	0	2	0
Billy Carr	England	DF	1	0	0	0	1	0
Laurie Cumming	Ireland	FW	1	0	0	0	1	0
Johnny Dent	England	FW	18	8	2	0	20	8
Roy Goodall	England	DF	29	5	8	1	37	6
Alex Jackson	Scotland	FW	39	19	8	5	47	24
Bob Kelly	England	FW	35	5	8	0	43	5
Tommy Meads	England	DF	27	1	2	0	29	1
Billy Mercer	England	GK	23	0	7	0	30	0
Bill Pickering	England	DF	1	0	0	0	1	0
Harry Raw	England	FW	10	2	0	0	10	2
Levi Redfern	England	DF	23	0	7	0	30	0
Jimmy Smailes	England	MF	3	0	0	0	3	0
Billy Smith	England	MF	38	17	8	4	46	21
Norman Smith	England	DF	6	0	0	0	6	0
Bon Spence	England	DF	5	0	1	0	6	0
David Steele	Scotland	DF	24	0	6	2	30	2
Clem Stephenson	England	FW	31	2	8	0	39	2
Hugh Turner	England	GK	19	0	1	0	20	0
Sam Wadsworth	England	DF	17	0	4	0	21	0
George Wilson	Scotland	MF	1	1	0	0	1	1
Tom Wilson	England	DF	41	0	8	0	49	0
