= 1929–30 Huddersfield Town A.F.C. season =

Huddersfield Town
1929–30 season
- Chairman: Sir Amos Brook Hirst
- Manager: Clem Stephenson
- Stadium: Leeds Road
- Football League First Division: 10th
- FA Cup: Runners-Up (eliminated by Arsenal)
- Top goalscorer: League: Harry Davies (10); All: Alex Jackson (17)
- Highest home attendance: 47,564 vs Sheffield United (25 January 1930)
- Lowest home attendance: 5,182 vs Portsmouth (7 December 1929)
- Biggest win: 3–0 vs Liverpool (16 September 1929); 3–0 vs Burnley (26 October 1929); 3–0 vs West Ham United (26 December 1929); 4–1 vs Sheffield Wednesday (22 February 1930)
- Biggest defeat: 1–7 vs Bolton Wanderers (1 January 1930)

Huddersfield Town's 1929–30 campaign was a season that saw Town reach their 4th FA Cup Final in 10 years. They finished in 10th place in Clem Stephenson's first season in charge.

Huddersfield Town lost to Arsenal in the FA Cup Final.

== Squad at the start of the season ==
Note: Flags indicate national team as defined under FIFA eligibility rules; some limited exceptions apply. Players may hold more than one non-FIFA nationality.

Pos.	Nation	Player
GK	ENG	Hugh Turner
DF	ENG	Billy Carr
DF	ENG	Billy Fogg
DF	ENG	Roy Goodall
DF	ENG	Jimmy Naylor
DF	ENG	Levi Redfern
DF	ENG	George Roughton
DF	ENG	Bon Spence
DF	ENG	Tom Wade
DF	ENG	Sam Wadsworth
DF	ENG	Tom Wilson

Pos.	Nation	Player
DF	ENG	Alf Young
MF	EIR	Laurie Cumming
MF	SCO	Alex Jackson
MF	ENG	Jimmy Smailes
MF	ENG	Billy Smith
FW	ENG	Harry Davies
FW	ENG	Johnny Dent
FW	ENG	Bob Kelly
FW	WAL	Wilf Lewis
FW	ENG	Harry Raw
FW	ENG	Ernie Whittam

== Review ==
Following the disappointing 16th-place finish the previous season, Jack Chaplin stepped down from the manager's hotseat to be the assistant to the recently retired Town legend Clem Stephenson. The season produced mixed results which varied from a 4–1 win over eventual champions Sheffield Wednesday to the massive 7–1 defeat to Bolton Wanderers on New Year's Day 1930.

The season is most noted for the team's FA Cup run, which saw the team reach their 4th final, mainly thanks to the 9 cup goals scored by Alex Jackson. Unfortunately, the final was against an Arsenal side led by Town's managerial legend Herbert Chapman. The Gunners beat the Terriers 2–0 at Wembley to win their first ever title. That wouldn't be the last title they would win under Chapman.

== Squad at the end of the season ==
Note: Flags indicate national team as defined under FIFA eligibility rules; some limited exceptions apply. Players may hold more than one non-FIFA nationality.

Pos.	Nation	Player
GK	ENG	Hugh Turner
DF	ENG	Austen Campbell
DF	ENG	Billy Carr
DF	ENG	Billy Fogg
DF	ENG	Roy Goodall
DF	ENG	Reg Mountford
DF	ENG	Jimmy Naylor
DF	ENG	Levi Redfern
DF	ENG	George Roughton
DF	ENG	Bon Spence
DF	ENG	Tom Wade
DF	ENG	Tom Wilson

Pos.	Nation	Player
DF	ENG	Alf Young
MF	ENG	George Crownshaw
MF	SCO	Alex Jackson
MF	ENG	Gerry Kelly
MF	ENG	Jimmy Smailes
MF	ENG	Billy Smith
FW	ENG	Bob Kelly
FW	WAL	Wilf Lewis
FW	ENG	Dave Mangnall
FW	ENG	Harry Raw
FW	ENG	Ernie Whittam

== Results ==
=== Division One ===
Date	Opponents	Home/ Away	Result F - A	Scorers	Attendance	Position
31 August 1929	Leicester City	H	3 - 1	Dent, Smith, Jackson	16,646	7th
4 September 1929	Liverpool	A	0 - 3		30,607	12th
7 September 1929	Birmingham	A	1 - 4	Dixon	24,830	15th
14 September 1929	Leeds United	H	1 - 0	Davies	28,287	14th
16 September 1929	Liverpool	H	3 - 0	Davies (3)	11,988	8th
21 September 1929	Sheffield United	H	2 - 2	Jackson, Smith	16,526	8th
24 September 1929	Grimsby Town	A	2 - 4	Smith, Davies	14,989	9th
28 September 1929	Newcastle United	A	2 - 5	Dent, Davies	29,629	16th
5 October 1929	Blackburn Rovers	H	0 - 0		16,543	18th
12 October 1929	Middlesbrough	A	3 - 1	Fogg, Raw, Jackson	24,231	15th
19 October 1929	Sheffield Wednesday	A	1 - 3	Fogg	25,998	19th
26 October 1929	Burnley	H	3 - 0	B. Kelly, G. Kelly, Smailes	15,664	13th
2 November 1929	Sunderland	A	0 - 1		18,912	16th
9 November 1929	Aston Villa	H	1 - 1	Jackson	18,183	14th
16 November 1929	Everton	A	2 - 0	Jackson, Davies	28,892	9th
23 November 1929	Derby County	H	0 - 1		11,402	10th
30 November 1929	Manchester City	A	1 - 1	Crownshaw	28,746	11th
7 December 1929	Portsmouth	H	2 - 1	Davies, B. Kelly	5,182	8th
14 December 1929	Arsenal	A	0 - 2		34,097	13th
21 December 1929	Bolton Wanderers	H	0 - 2		12,625	15th
25 December 1929	West Ham United	A	3 - 2	Jackson, Mangnall (2)	28,390	14th
26 December 1929	West Ham United	H	3 - 0	B. Kelly, Raw, Mangnall	21,657	10th
28 December 1929	Leicester City	A	2 - 1	Raw (2)	23,463	9th
1 January 1930	Bolton Wanderers	A	1 - 7	Mangnall	27,355	10th
4 January 1930	Birmingham	H	1 - 1	G. Kelly	14,596	11th
18 January 1930	Leeds United	A	1 - 0	Davies	40,789	7th
1 February 1930	Newcastle United	H	2 - 0	Mangnall (2)	14,661	6th
8 February 1930	Blackburn Rovers	A	2 - 5	Mangnall, G. Kelly	23,140	10th
17 February 1930	Sheffield United	A	1 - 0	Lewis	13,718	6th
22 February 1930	Sheffield Wednesday	H	4 - 1	B. Kelly, Lewis, G. Kelly, Smith	27,001	5th
8 March 1930	Sunderland	H	0 - 2		19,601	9th
15 March 1930	Aston Villa	A	3 - 5	Lewis, Jackson, Smith	22,467	11th
26 March 1930	Middlesbrough	H	1 - 0	Davies	8,234	10th
29 March 1930	Derby County	A	2 - 2	G. Kelly, Jackson	16,344	9th
1 April 1930	Burnley	A	3 - 1	Mangnall, G. Kelly, Raw	9,418	7th
5 April 1930	Manchester City	H	1 - 1	Smailes	14,180	7th
12 April 1930	Portsmouth	A	1 - 0	B. Kelly	17,585	6th
18 April 1930	Manchester United	A	0 - 1		26,496	6th
19 April 1930	Arsenal	H	2 - 2	B. Kelly, G. Kelly	11,988	6th
22 April 1930	Manchester United	H	2 - 2	Smailes, Lewis	20,716	7th
28 April 1930	Everton	H	1 - 2	Naylor	11,180	10th
3 May 1930	Grimsby Town	H	0 - 1		14,525	10th

=== FA Cup ===
Date	Round	Opponents	Home/ Away	Result F - A	Scorers	Attendance
11 January 1930	Round 3	Bury	A	0 - 0		25,085
15 January 1930	Round 3 replay	Bury	H	3 - 1	Jackson (3)	20,731
25 January 1930	Round 4	Sheffield United	H	2 - 1	Jackson (2)	47,564
15 February 1930	Round 5	Bradford City	H	2 - 1	B. Kelly, Jackson	45,659
1 March 1930	Round 6	Aston Villa	A	2 - 1	Smith, Jackson	65,732
22 March 1930	Semi-Final	Sheffield Wednesday	N	2 - 1	Jackson (2)	69,292
26 April 1930	Final	Arsenal	N	0 - 2		92,488

== Appearances and goals ==
Name	Nationality	Position	League		FA Cup		Total	
Name	Nationality	Position	Apps	Goals	Apps	Goals	Apps	Goals
Austen Campbell	England	DF	34	0	7	0	41	0
George Crownshaw	England	FW	6	1	0	0	6	1
Laurie Cumming	Ireland	FW	1	0	0	0	1	0
Harry Davies	England	FW	30	10	2	0	32	10
Johnny Dent	England	FW	3	2	0	0	3	2
Ernie Dixon	England	FW	5	1	0	0	5	1
Billy Fogg	England	DF	31	2	6	0	37	2
Roy Goodall	England	DF	37	0	7	0	44	0
Alex Jackson	Scotland	FW	30	8	7	9	37	17
Bob Kelly	England	FW	28	6	7	1	35	7
Gerry Kelly	England	MF	14	7	0	0	14	7
Wilf Lewis	Wales	FW	10	4	2	0	12	4
Dave Mangnall	England	FW	14	8	4	0	18	8
Reg Mountford	England	DF	4	0	0	0	4	0
Jimmy Naylor	England	DF	16	1	1	0	17	1
Harry Raw	England	FW	23	5	6	0	29	5
Levi Redfern	England	DF	7	0	0	0	7	0
George Roughton	England	DF	20	0	0	0	20	0
Jimmy Smailes	England	MF	8	3	2	0	10	3
Billy Smith	England	MF	33	5	5	1	38	6
Bon Spence	England	DF	19	0	7	0	26	0
Hugh Turner	England	GK	42	0	7	0	49	0
Tom Wade	England	DF	1	0	0	0	1	0
Sam Wadsworth	England	DF	3	0	0	0	3	0
Ernie Whittam	England	FW	1	0	0	0	1	0
Tom Wilson	England	DF	37	0	7	0	44	0
Alf Young	England	DF	5	0	0	0	5	0
