= 1926–27 Huddersfield Town A.F.C. season =

Huddersfield Town
1926–27 season
- Chairman: Sir Amos Brook Hirst
- Manager: Jack Chaplin
- Stadium: Leeds Road
- Football League First Division: 2nd
- FA Cup: Third round (eliminated by Millwall)
- Top goalscorer: League: George Brown (27); All: George Brown (28)
- Highest home attendance: 44,636 vs Newcastle United (19 April 1927)
- Lowest home attendance: 6,140 vs Liverpool (26 March 1927)
- Biggest win: 5–0 vs Blackburn Rovers (27 December 1926)
- Biggest defeat: 0–4 vs Bolton Wanderers (30 April 1927)
Home colours

Huddersfield Town's 1926–27 campaign was a season which saw the team lose their English league title by five points to Newcastle United after winning it for the previous 3 seasons.

== Squad at the start of the season ==
Note: Flags indicate national team as defined under FIFA eligibility rules; some limited exceptions apply. Players may hold more than one non-FIFA nationality.

| Pos. | Nation | Player |
|---|---|---|
| GK | ENG | Billy Mercer |
| GK | ENG | Ted Taylor |
| DF | ENG | Ned Barkas |
| DF | ENG | Harry Cawthorne |
| DF | ENG | Roy Goodall |
| DF | ENG | George Shaw |
| DF | ENG | Norman Smith |
| DF | ENG | Bon Spence |
| DF | SCO | David Steele |
| DF | ENG | Sam Wadsworth |
| DF | ENG | Billy Watson |

| Pos. | Nation | Player |
|---|---|---|
| DF | ENG | Tom Wilson |
| MF | SCO | Alex Jackson |
| MF | ENG | Jacky Slicer |
| MF | ENG | Billy Smith |
| FW | ENG | George Brown |
| FW | ENG | George Cook |
| FW | ENG | Johnny Dent |
| FW | SCO | William Devlin |
| FW | ENG | Harry Raw |
| FW | ENG | Clem Stephenson |

== Review ==
Town were on top of the world following their 3rd consecutive 1st Division championship. Town's season was a very successful season in the league, although they had as many draws as wins during the season, which probably cost them their chances of their 4th consecutive title, although they were only one point off Newcastle United after beating them on Easter Tuesday, but their last 3 games produced 0–0 draws against Manchester United and Aston Villa at Leeds Road along with a 4–0 defeat at Burnden Park against Bolton Wanderers. That meant Town finished 5 points behind Newcastle at the end of the season.

== Squad at the end of the season ==
Note: Flags indicate national team as defined under FIFA eligibility rules; some limited exceptions apply. Players may hold more than one non-FIFA nationality.

| Pos. | Nation | Player |
|---|---|---|
| GK | ENG | Billy Mercer |
| GK | ENG | Hugh Turner |
| DF | ENG | Ned Barkas |
| DF | ENG | Eddie Carr |
| DF | ENG | Roy Goodall |
| DF | ENG | Tommy Meads |
| DF | ENG | Norman Smith |
| DF | ENG | Bon Spence |
| DF | SCO | David Steele |
| DF | ENG | Sam Wadsworth |

| Pos. | Nation | Player |
|---|---|---|
| DF | ENG | Billy Watson |
| DF | ENG | Tom Wilson |
| MF | SCO | Alex Jackson |
| MF | ENG | Jacky Slicer |
| MF | ENG | Billy Smith |
| FW | ENG | George Brown |
| FW | ENG | Johnny Dent |
| FW | ENG | Bob Kelly |
| FW | ENG | Harry Raw |
| FW | ENG | Clem Stephenson |

== Results ==
=== Division One ===
| Date | Opponents | Home/ Away | Result F–A | Scorers | Attendance | Position |
|---|---|---|---|---|---|---|
| 28 August 1926 | Bury | A | 2–2 | Stephenson, Jackson | 25,204 | 10th |
| 30 August 1926 | West Bromwich Albion | H | 4–1 | Devlin (2), B. Smith (2) | 16,130 | 2nd |
| 4 September 1926 | Birmingham | H | 0–2 | | 19,893 | 9th |
| 8 September 1926 | Sunderland | A | 1–1 | Brown | 27,739 | 9th |
| 11 September 1926 | Tottenham Hotspur | A | 3–3 | B. Smith, Stephenson, Cawthorne | 29,516 | 9th |
| 14 September 1926 | Sunderland | H | 0–0 | | 15,090 | 7th |
| 18 September 1926 | West Ham United | H | 2–1 | Devlin (2) | 16,800 | 6th |
| 25 September 1926 | Sheffield Wednesday | A | 1–1 | Jackson | 32,493 | 8th |
| 2 October 1926 | Leicester City | H | 5–3 | Brown (3), Slicer (2) | 25,288 | 6th |
| 9 October 1926 | Everton | A | 0–0 | | 22,419 | 8th |
| 16 October 1926 | Cardiff City | H | 0–0 | | 17,705 | 8th |
| 23 October 1926 | Burnley | A | 2–2 | Brown (2) | 33,638 | 8th |
| 30 October 1926 | Leeds United | H | 4–1 | Brown (3), Wadsworth | 29,679 | 6th |
| 6 November 1926 | Liverpool | A | 3–2 | Devlin, B. Smith, Brown | 28,703 | 4th |
| 13 November 1926 | Arsenal | H | 3–3 | Goodall (pen), Devlin, Brown | 16,219 | 3rd |
| 20 November 1926 | Sheffield United | A | 3–3 | Devlin, Brown (2) | 21,995 | 5th |
| 27 November 1926 | Derby County | H | 4–2 | Brown (2), Jackson, Goodall (pen) | 16,733 | 3rd |
| 4 December 1926 | Manchester United | A | 0–0 | | 33,135 | 3rd |
| 11 December 1926 | Bolton Wanderers | H | 1–0 | Brown | 24,667 | 2nd |
| 18 December 1926 | Aston Villa | A | 0–3 | | 31,236 | 4th |
| 25 December 1926 | Blackburn Rovers | A | 2–4 | Stephenson, Jackson | 30,144 | 5th |
| 27 December 1926 | Blackburn Rovers | H | 5–0 | Brown (2), Jackson, B. Smith, Stephenson | 34,758 | 4th |
| 1 January 1927 | West Bromwich Albion | A | 2–2 | Brown, Cook | 24,640 | 4th |
| 15 January 1927 | Bury | H | 3–1 | Devlin, Brown (2) | 11,889 | 4th |
| 22 January 1927 | Birmingham | A | 3–1 | Goodall (pen), Cook, B. Smith | 16,779 | 3rd |
| 29 January 1927 | Tottenham Hotspur | H | 2–0 | Brown, Cook | 15,147 | 2nd |
| 5 February 1927 | West Ham United | A | 2–3 | Brown, Devlin | 19,087 | 4th |
| 12 February 1927 | Sheffield Wednesday | H | 4–3 | Kelly (3), Jackson | 22,329 | 2nd |
| 19 February 1927 | Leicester City | A | 4–2 | Osborne (og), B. Smith, Devlin, Brown | 34,142 | 1st |
| 26 February 1927 | Everton | H | 0–0 | | 20,660 | 2nd |
| 12 March 1927 | Burnley | H | 2–0 | Brown (2) | 23,893 | 2nd |
| 19 March 1927 | Leeds United | A | 1–1 | Stephenson | 36,364 | 2nd |
| 21 March 1927 | Cardiff City | A | 0–2 | | 17,051 | 2nd |
| 26 March 1927 | Liverpool | H | 1–0 | B. Smith | 6,140 | 2nd |
| 2 April 1927 | Arsenal | A | 2–0 | Dent (2) | 24,409 | 2nd |
| 9 April 1927 | Sheffield United | H | 0–2 | | 8,128 | 3rd |
| 15 April 1927 | Newcastle United | A | 0–1 | | 60,149 | 3rd |
| 16 April 1927 | Derby County | A | 4–4 | Dent, Goodall (pen), Kelly, Meads | 24,600 | 2nd |
| 19 April 1927 | Newcastle United | H | 1–0 | Brown | 44,636 | 2nd |
| 23 April 1927 | Manchester United | H | 0–0 | | 13,870 | 2nd |
| 30 April 1927 | Bolton Wanderers | A | 0–4 | | 21,229 | 2nd |
| 7 May 1927 | Aston Villa | H | 0–0 | | 10,603 | 2nd |

=== FA Cup ===
| Date | Round | Opponents | Home/ Away | Result F–A | Scorers | Attendance |
|---|---|---|---|---|---|---|
| 8 January 1927 | Round 3 | Millwall | A | 1–3 | Brown | 35,962 |

== Appearances and goals ==
| Name | Nationality | Position | League | | FA Cup | | Total | |
| Name | Nationality | Position | Apps | Goals | Apps | Goals | Apps | Goals |
|---|---|---|---|---|---|---|---|---|
| Ned Barkas | England | DF | 9 | 0 | 0 | 0 | 9 | 0 |
| George Brown | England | FW | 40 | 27 | 1 | 1 | 41 | 28 |
| Billy Carr | England | DF | 2 | 0 | 0 | 0 | 2 | 0 |
| Harry Cawthorne | England | DF | 21 | 1 | 0 | 0 | 21 | 1 |
| George Cook | England | FW | 8 | 3 | 1 | 0 | 9 | 3 |
| Johnny Dent | England | FW | 6 | 3 | 0 | 0 | 6 | 3 |
| William Devlin | Scotland | FW | 28 | 10 | 0 | 0 | 28 | 10 |
| Roy Goodall | England | DF | 34 | 4 | 1 | 0 | 35 | 4 |
| Alex Jackson | Scotland | FW | 32 | 6 | 1 | 0 | 33 | 6 |
| Bob Kelly | England | FW | 14 | 4 | 0 | 0 | 14 | 4 |
| Tommy Meads | England | DF | 10 | 1 | 0 | 0 | 10 | 1 |
| Billy Mercer | England | GK | 8 | 0 | 0 | 0 | 8 | 0 |
| Harry Raw | England | FW | 3 | 0 | 0 | 0 | 3 | 0 |
| George Shaw | England | DF | 5 | 0 | 0 | 0 | 5 | 0 |
| Jacky Slicer | England | MF | 7 | 2 | 0 | 0 | 7 | 2 |
| Billy Smith | England | MF | 39 | 8 | 1 | 0 | 40 | 8 |
| Norman Smith | England | DF | 17 | 0 | 0 | 0 | 17 | 0 |
| David Steele | Scotland | DF | 20 | 0 | 1 | 0 | 21 | 0 |
| Clem Stephenson | England | FW | 25 | 5 | 1 | 0 | 26 | 5 |
| Ted Taylor | England | GK | 10 | 0 | 0 | 0 | 10 | 0 |
| Hugh Turner | England | GK | 24 | 0 | 1 | 0 | 25 | 0 |
| Sam Wadsworth | England | DF | 36 | 1 | 1 | 0 | 37 | 1 |
| Billy Watson | England | DF | 22 | 0 | 1 | 0 | 23 | 0 |
| Tom Wilson | England | DF | 42 | 0 | 1 | 0 | 43 | 0 |
