= George Wilson =

George Wilson may refer to:

== Arts and entertainment ==
- George Balch Wilson (1927–2021), American composer, professor emeritus at the University of Michigan
- George Washington Wilson (1823–1893), Scottish photographer
- George Christopher (actor) (George Wilson, born 1970), British actor
- George Wilson (artist) (1921–1998), American comic book artist

== Law and politics ==
- George Wilson (Chief Colonial Secretary of Uganda), 1862–1943, colonial administrator in Uganda
- George Wilson (reformer) (1808–1870), English political activist, known as chairman of the Anti-Cornlaw League
- George A. Wilson (1884–1953), US Senator and Governor of Iowa
- George Grafton Wilson (1863–1951), distinguished professor of international law
- George H. Wilson (1905–1985), member of the US House of Representatives
- George M. Wilson (1913–?), politician in Newfoundland, Canada
- George W. Wilson (politician) (1840–1909), member of the US House of Representatives
- George W. Wilson (IRS commissioner) (1843–1900), Commissioner of Internal Revenue, 1899–1900
- George Wilson (mayor) (1816–1902), mayor of Pittsburgh
- George P. Wilson (1840–1920), Minnesota lawyer and politician
- George Wilson (Australian politician) (1895–1942), member of the New South Wales Legislative Assembly
- George Henry Wilson (1893–1988), Canadian politician
- G. E. Wilson, Oklahoma state senator
- George L. Wilson (1853–1924), Oklahoma state senator

== Military ==
- George D. Wilson (1830–1862), American soldier and Medal of Honor recipient
- George Wilson (Royal Navy officer) (1756–1826), naval officer
- George Wilson (major) (1836–1897), German-American Union Army officer
- George Wilson (VC) (1886–1926), Scottish recipient of the Victoria Cross

== Science and engineering ==
- George Wilson (chemist) (1818–1859), Regius Professor of Technology at the University of Edinburgh
- George Ambler Wilson (1906–1977), British civil engineer
- George Fergusson Wilson (1822–1902), English industrial chemist

== Sports ==
=== American football ===
- George Wilson (safety) (born 1981), player
- George Wilson (American football coach) (1914–1978), professional football player and coach
- George Wilson (American football halfback) (1905–1990), halfback at Lafayette College, College Football Hall of Fame inductee, World War II U.S. Marine general
- George Wilson (quarterback) (1943–2011), player
- Wildcat Wilson (George Wilson, 1901–1963), player for the University of Washington and the Los Angeles Wildcats of the first American Football League

=== Baseball ===
- George Wilson (outfielder) (1925–1975), American professional baseball outfielder
- George Wilson (pitcher) (1875–1915), American baseball pitcher, Negro leagues career 1895–1905
- George F. Wilson (1889–1967), American professional baseball catcher

=== Basketball ===
- George Wilson (basketball, born 1942) (1942–2023), American professional basketball player
- George Wilson (American football coach) (1914–1978), American professional basketball player

=== Association football ===
- George Wilson (footballer, born 1859) (1859–1924), English footballer (Mexborough, Wednesday, Blackburn Olympic, Preston North End)
- George Wilson (footballer, born 1883) (1883–1960), Scottish footballer (Newcastle, Hearts, Everton, Scotland)
- George Wilson (footballer, born 1887) (1887–1970), Scottish footballer (Aberdeen)
- George Wilson (footballer, born 1892) (1892–1961), English footballer (Blackpool, Sheffield Wednesday, Nelson)
- George Wilson (Irish footballer), George Rupert Wilson; see List of AFC Bournemouth players (25–99 appearances)
- George Wilson (footballer, born 1905) (1905–1984), Scottish footballer (Clydebank, Leeds United)
- George Wilson (footballer, born 1912) English football goalkeeper (Ayr United, York City)
- George Wilson (footballer, born 2001), English footballer (Altrincham, Fylde); see 2024–25 Rochdale A.F.C. season

=== Cricket ===
- George Alfred Wilson (1877–1962), English cricketer, played for Worcestershire 1899–1906
- George Wilson (New Zealand cricketer) (George Charles Lee Wilson, 1887–1917), New Zealand cricketer
- George Clifford Wilson (1902–1957), English cricketer, played for Worcestershire 1924–26, son of George Alfred Wilson
- Billy Wilson (cricketer) (George Lindsay Wilson, 1868–1920), Australian cricketer, played for Sussex 1887–95 and Victoria 1898–99
- George Wilson (Yorkshire cricketer) (George Arthur Wilson, 1916–2002), English first class cricketer, played for Yorkshire 1936–39
- George Wilson (Irish cricketer) (1916–1995), Irish cricketer

=== Other sports ===
- George Wilson (Australian footballer) (1920–2014), Australian footballer for Collingwood and St Kilda
- George Wilson (1940s rugby player), rugby union, and rugby league player of the 1940s and 1950s
- George Wilson (rugby league, born 1975) (born 1975), Australian rugby league player
- George Wilson (rugby union, born 1866) (1866–1908), Scottish rugby union player
- George Wilson (race walker) (1766–1839), Newcastle-born competitive walker
- George Wilson (bowls) (1903–?), South African lawn bowler

== Other ==
- George Wilson of Glenluce (1823–1899), Scottish archaeologist
- George C. Wilson (1927–2014), American journalist
- George Everett Wilson, fictional character in the comic strip Dennis the Menace
- George Wilson (Coronation Street), fictional character in the British soap opera Coronation Street
- George Wilson (The Great Gatsby), fictional character in the novel The Great Gatsby
- George Wilson (businessman) (1869–1939), New Zealand philanthropist knighted in the 1934 Birthday Honours
- George Wilson, convicted of robbing the US Mail and sentenced to death, subject of United States v. Wilson

== See also ==
- Georges Wilson (1921–2010), French film and TV actor
