= 1930 FA Cup final =

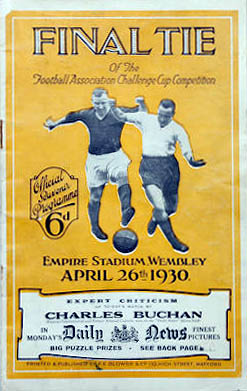
- Programme cover
- Event: 1929–30 FA Cup
Arsenal	Huddersfield Town
2	0
- Date: 26 April 1930
- Venue: Wembley Stadium, Middlesex
- Referee: T. Crew (Leicester)
- Attendance: 92,499

The 1930 FA Cup final was a football match contested by Arsenal and Huddersfield Town at Wembley Stadium on 26 April 1930. It was the final match of the 1929–30 FA Cup, the 55th season of the world's oldest football knockout competition, the FA Cup.

Arsenal won 2–0, with goals from Alex James and Jack Lambert. As a result, Arsenal won their first FA Cup after a defeat in their FA Cup final debut in 1927.

== Background ==
The 1930 Final was the first Cup Final in which both teams entered the pitch side by side, led by Tom Parker and Tom Wilson, in honour of Arsenal manager Herbert Chapman, who had managed Huddersfield to great success in the 1920s. When Chapman arrived at Arsenal in 1925, he claimed it would take him five years to build a winning team. Five years later, Arsenal's cup final performance proved him right.

Historically, Huddersfield Town had been a more dominant team, winning the 1921-22 FA Cup. Coached by Chapman, Huddersfield won the league in 1923-4, 1924-25, and 1925-26, making them the first club to win three successive league titles. In 1927-28, Huddersfield Town had finished runners-up in both the league and the FA Cup. Meanwhile, Arsenal had won nothing in nearly fifty years with only a runners-up performance in the 1926-27 FA Cup to speak of.

Arsenal came into the game following a 6–6 draw at Leicester City, the highest-scoring draw in English top-flight history, five days prior. Dave Halliday, who scored four of Arsenal's goals that game, was omitted from the Cup Final squad in favour of Jack Lambert.

The 1930 FA Cup Final is remembered for the Graf Zeppelin passing over the stadium. The Zeppelin was, at the time, the largest airship ever and was around 776 ft in length. Prior to the match, King George V was also introduced to the players, a surprise outing as he had been recovering from illness for eighteen months. The airship saluted him as it passed by.

After first being broadcast on BBC Radio in 1928, the 1930 final was the first for which a fee was paid for the rights. It was also only the fifth time that a game had been broadcast live. George Allisson, an Arsenal director and shareholder, would provide commentary.

The rest of the Cup day programming included a 4-4 draw between Wolves and Bradford Park Avenue, Fred Cheesmuir scoring six goals for Gillingham in their 6-0 defeat of Merthyr town, Lincoln City beating New Brighton 5-2, and Sheffield Wednesday holding their lead at the top of the First Division, beating Grimsby Town 1-0.

Arsenal's Bill Seddon, who died in January 1993 at the age of 91, was the last surviving player to appear in the game.

== Road to the final ==
=== Arsenal ===
11 Jan 1930
3rd Round

Arsenal	2–0	Chelsea

Highbury, London
25 Jan 1930
4th Round

Arsenal	2–2	Birmingham City

Highbury, London
29 Jan 1930
4th Round Replay

Birmingham City	0–1	Arsenal

St Andrew's, Birmingham
15 Feb 1930
5th Round

Middlesbrough	0–2	Arsenal

Ayresome Park, Middlesbrough
1 Mar 1930
6th Round

West Ham United	0–3	Arsenal

Boleyn Ground, London
22 Mar 1930
Semi-final

Arsenal	2–2	Hull City

Elland Road, Leeds
26 Mar 1930
Semi-final Replay

Hull City	0–1	Arsenal

Villa Park, Birmingham

=== Huddersfield Town ===
11 Jan 1930
3rd Round

Bury	0–1	Huddersfield Town

Gigg Lane, Bury
25 Jan 1930
4th Round

Huddersfield Town	2–1	Sheffield United

Leeds Road, Huddersfield
15 Feb 1930
5th Round

Huddersfield Town	2–1	Bradford City

Leeds Road, Huddersfield
1 Mar 1930
6th Round

Aston Villa	1–2	Huddersfield Town

Villa Park, Birmingham
22 Mar 1930
Semi-final

Huddersfield Town	2–1	Sheffield Wednesday

Old Trafford, Manchester

== Match summary ==
Both teams began the match in Chapman's now-famous W-M formation. Arsenal wore red shirts while Huddersfield wore blue and white striped shirts.

Arsenal scored the first goal in the sixteenth minute. Allegedly, inside left Alex James had said to Cliff Bastin on the way to the match: "If we get a free-kick in their half early on, I'll slip it out to you on the wing. You give it me back and I'll have a crack at goal." During the match, referee Tom Crew awarded Arsenal a free-kick as James was fouled 40 yards from goal. James took the free kick immediately, a move which was controversial at the time. He passed to Bastin, who slipped it back through to James who then scored the first goal for Arsenal.

Huddersfield attacked for the rest of the match. Despite the aggressive and risky goaltending by Charlie Preedy, Arsenal's backup goalkeeper, no goals were let in. Alex Jackson had two excellent chances, a header and an excellent left-footed drive that went just wide. Arsenal's defense also effectively to shut down Huddersfield forwards. The Huddersfield defense also performed well, with Roy Goodall preventing Cliff Bastin from threatening the goal.

Towards the end of the match, a long clearance from James found centre forward Jack Lambert. Lambert slipped between Huddersfield defenders Goodall and Bon Spence to rush at goalkeeper Hugh Turner. Lambert scored, though had no teammates to celebrate with, and had to clap for himself as he ran back to his own half. Arsenal had won the cup for the first time.

After the game, the two sides dined together at Cafe Royal, an innovation from Chapman which did not stick.

== Match details ==
26 April 1930
15:00 BST

Arsenal	2–0	Huddersfield Town
James 16'; Lambert 88'	(Report)

Wembley Stadium, Middlesex
Attendance: 92,499
Referee: T. Crew (Leicester)

Arsenal	Huddersfield Town

GK	(England) Charlie Preedy
RB	(England) Tom Parker (c)
LB	(England) Eddie Hapgood
RH	(England) Alf Baker
CB	(England) Bill Seddon
LH	(Wales) Bob John
OR	(England) Joe Hulme
IR	(England) David Jack
CF	(England) Jack Lambert
IL	(Scotland) Alex James
OL	(England) Cliff Bastin
Manager:
(England) Herbert Chapman

GK	(England) Hugh Turner
RB	(England) Roy Goodall
LB	(England) Bon Spence
RH	(England) Jimmy Naylor
CH	(England) Tom Wilson (c)
LH	(England) Austen Campbell
OR	(Scotland) Alex Jackson
IR	(England) Bob Kelly
CF	(England) Harry Davies
IL	(England) Harry Raw
OL	(England) Billy Smith
Manager:
(England) Clem Stephenson

Match rules

- 90 minutes.
- 30 minutes of extra-time if necessary.
- Replay if scores still level.
