= Andy Kennedy (footballer, born 1897) =

Irish footballer

Personal information
- Full name: Andrew Lynd Kennedy
- Date of birth: 1 September 1897
- Place of birth: Belfast, Ireland
- Date of death: December 1963 (aged 66)
- Height: 5 ft 8 in (1.73 m)
- Position: Full back

Youth career
- Belfast Celtic

Senior career*
Years	Team	Apps	(Gls)
1915–1920	Glentoran		
1920–1922	Crystal Palace	1	(0)
1922–1928	Arsenal	122	(0)
1928–1930	Everton	1	(0)
1930–?	Tranmere Rovers		

International career
1923	Ireland	2	(0)
- * Club domestic league appearances and goals

Andrew Lynd Kennedy (1 September 1897 – December 1963) was an Irish footballer.

== Career ==
Born in Belfast, Kennedy played as a youth for Belfast Celtic before joining Glentoran in 1915. He moved to England in 1920, joining London side Crystal Palace in 1920; he played a solitary Division Three South game for them before moving across the city to join Arsenal as a reserve full back in August 1922.

Soon after joining Arsenal, Kennedy stepped up to the first team after Arthur Hutchins was dropped, and made his debut against Birmingham on 2 December 1922. He impressed enough that he played all but one of the Gunners' remaining games that season, and gained international recognition, winning two caps for Ireland in their 1923 British Home Championship campaign.

After injury wrecked his 1923–24 season – Kennedy missed the start of the season, and after returning was dropped from the side after Arsenal lost 6–1 to Huddersfield Town – he played all but one of Arsenal's League matches the following season (as Arsenal narrowly avoided relegation). However, he did not find favour under Herbert Chapman, who first switched Bob John back into defence, and then signed Horace Cope during 1925–26 as a replacement for Kennedy. However, Cope was injured before Arsenal's first FA Cup final, meaning Kennedy started the match, against Cardiff City; however, a mistake by Dan Lewis meant Arsenal lost 1–0, and Kennedy only walked away with a runners-up medal.

Kennedy only played two more matches for Arsenal, both of them heavy defeats (5–1 and 4–0). Displeased with his team's defence, Chapman had a clearout at Arsenal, and Kennedy was sold to Everton in January 1928. In all, Kennedy had played 129 matches for Arsenal. Everton won the First Division championship that season but Kennedy was only a reserve player that season. After a solitary League appearance for Everton, he moved on to Tranmere Rovers that summer, playing there for two seasons until his retirement in 1930.

== Death ==
He died in 1963, aged 66.

== Honours ==
Arsenal

- FA Cup runner-up: 1926–27
