= Syd Hoar =

English footballer (1895–1967)

Personal information
- Full name: Sydney Walter Hoar
- Date of birth: 28 November 1895
- Place of birth: Leagrave, Luton, England
- Date of death: May 1967 (aged 71)
- Position: Winger

Youth career
- Luton Town

Senior career*
Years	Team	Apps	(Gls)
1919–1924	Luton Town		
1924–1929	Arsenal	100	(16)
1929–1930	Clapton Orient		
- * Club domestic league appearances and goals

Sydney Walter Hoar (28 November 1895 – May 1967) was an English footballer.

Hoar was born in Leagrave, Luton, Bedfordshire, and joined local side Luton Town as a fifteen-year-old in 1911. He was a regular in the Hatters youth team up until the outbreak of World War I, when he joined the Army and served in the trenches of Northern France. After being gassed in an attack, he was invalided out of the war, and his football career looked in doubt. However, he managed to recover fully and returned to Luton Town after the end of the war, making himself known as a winger who could play on either flank. Hoar played over 150 league matches for Luton between 1919 and 1924, as they played in the Southern League and later the Third Division South.

In late 1924, Hoar joined Arsenal for £3,000, making his debut against Cardiff City on 29 November 1924, and went on to make nineteen appearances that season; he also had trials with England but never made it into the first team. By now, Hoar played more often on the right than the left, but the arrival of Joe Hulme put in 1926 forced him out of the Arsenal first team and he spent most of 1926-27 on the sidelines. However, Hoar forced himself back in the side towards the end of the season, taking over Sam Haden's spot on the left wing. Despite an injury in Arsenal's last game of that season, against Aston Villa, Hoar regained fitness in time to play in the FA Cup Final against Cardiff City; however he had a poor match and Arsenal lost 1-0 after a freak error by goalkeeper Dan Lewis.

Hoar continued to be a regular on the Arsenal left wing for another season, missing only four games in 1927-28 and scoring nine times. But in the close season, Arsenal signed Welsh international Charlie Jones, and Hoar played only six matches in 1928-29. He left Arsenal in September 1929 for Clapton Orient for a fee of £1,000. In all, he played 117 matches for Arsenal and scored 18 goals. Hoar was at Orient for a single season, before retiring in the summer of 1930. He died in 1967, at the age of 71.

== Honours ==
=== Player ===
Arsenal

- FA Cup runner-up: 1926–27
