= Bill Seddon =

English footballer

Personal information
- Full name: William Charles Seddon
- Date of birth: 28 July 1901
- Place of birth: Clapton, London, England
- Date of death: January 1993 (aged 91)
- Positions: Right half; centre half

Senior career*
Years	Team	Apps	(Gls)
1922–1924	Gillingham	0	(0)
1924–1932	Arsenal	69	(0)
1932–1933	Grimsby Town	20	(1)
1933–34	Luton Town	0	(0)
- * Club domestic league appearances and goals

William Charles Seddon (28 July 1901 – January 1993) was an English footballer.

== Career ==
Born in Clapton, London, he played junior football in London before joining Gillingham as an amateur, and had an unsuccessful trial with Aston Villa before joining Arsenal in December 1924. Seddon played as a half back and was mainly a second-string player, he played over 200 Football Combination matches for Arsenal Reserves, eventually rising to captain as the side won five Combination titles in the 1920s.

During the 1920s, Seddon played sparingly for the Arsenal first team, making his debut when deputising for Alf Baker in a 2–1 defeat against Sunderland on 10 April 1926. That was his only appearance of 1925–26, but edged his way into the first team with 17 appearances in 1926–27. However, he did not make the cut for the 1927 FA Cup Final, and with Arsenal's strong half-back line of Alf Baker, Jack Butler and Bob John. Seddon only played four times in 1927–28 and not at all in 1928–29.

However, in 1929–30 he was reintroduced into the Arsenal side, alternating with Baker at right half, until centre half Herbie Roberts was injured against West Ham United. Seddon moved into defence and not only played the last twelve games of that season, but started the 1930 FA Cup Final, in which Arsenal beat Huddersfield Town 2–0 to win their first major trophy. He played in Arsenal's 2–1 victory over Sheffield Wednesday in the Charity Shield at Stamford Bridge in October 1930.

Seddon continued to play for Arsenal, appearing 18 times in 1930–31 and winning a League Championship medal as Arsenal won their first ever league title. By this time he had reverted to right half, but the move of Charlie Jones to right half ousted him from the side and he only made five appearances in 1931–32. He eventually left the club in March 1932, moving to Grimsby Town for £2,500. In total, he played 76 matches for Arsenal, though he never scored a goal.

He spent two seasons with Grimsby before a single season with Luton Town. He retired from playing in 1934. He later worked as a trainer for Notts County and Romford. During World War II he served in Africa with the British Army, and returned to Romford after the war to become their groundsman. In 1967, Arsenal and Romford played a testimonial match for him on his retirement. He died in January 1993, aged 91.

== Honours ==
Arsenal

- FA Cup: 1929–30
