= 1927 FA Cup final =

English football championship

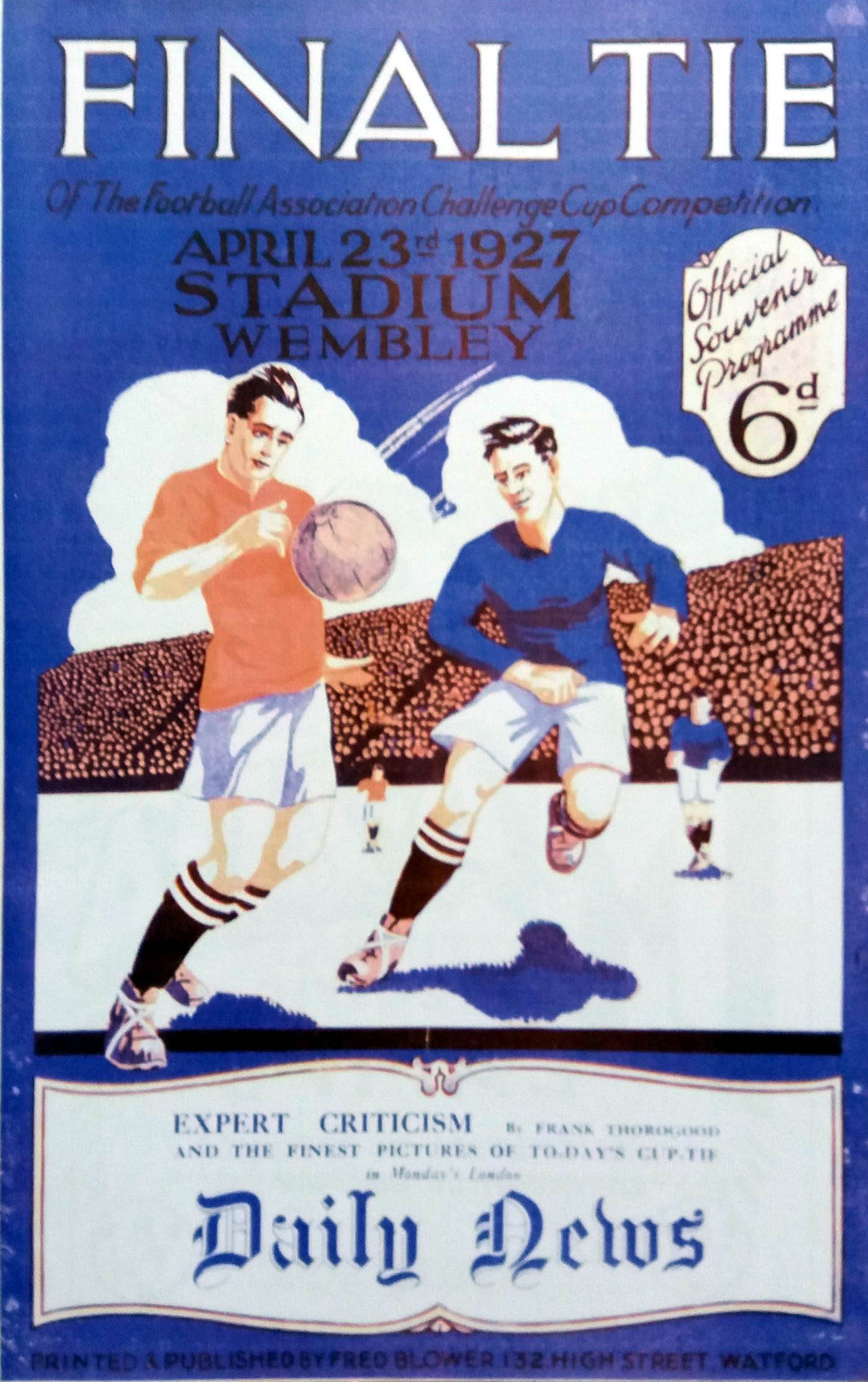
- Official programme
- Event: 1926–27 FA Cup
Cardiff City	Arsenal
(Wales)	(England)
1	0
- Date: 23 April 1927
- Venue: Wembley Stadium, London
- Referee: William F. Bunnell (Lancashire)
- Attendance: 91,206

The 1927 FA Cup final was an association football match between Cardiff City and Arsenal on 23 April 1927 at the Empire Stadium (the original Wembley Stadium). The final was the showpiece match of English football's primary cup competition, the Football Association Challenge Cup (FA Cup), organised by the Football Association. Cardiff, one of the few Welsh teams taking part, won the match 1–0. Their victory remains the only occasion the trophy, which was previously widely referred to as the "English Cup", has been won by a team based outside England.

The teams entered the competition in the third round as members of the Football League First Division and progressed through five rounds to reach the final. In the fifth round, Cardiff knocked out the reigning champions, Bolton Wanderers. By the quarter-final stage, Arsenal and Cardiff were the only teams from the First Division remaining.

On the day of the final, additional trains were provided to transport Cardiff's fans to Wembley, and police reinforcements were deployed to keep at bay fans who had been sold fake tickets. A concert held before the game included a rendition of "Abide with Me". Singing this song before the match has since become a cup final tradition. For the first time, the final was broadcast on the radio by the newly-formed British Broadcasting Corporation with commentary by George Allison and Derek "Uncle Mac" McCulloch. Some sources suggest the broadcast was the origin of the phrase "back to square one", although the expression predates the match. There were more than 300,000 applications for tickets, and 91,206 were in attendance. A further 15,000 fans listened in Cardiff's Cathays Park to the radio broadcast.

The only goal of the game was credited to Cardiff's Hughie Ferguson after his shot slipped out of the hands of Arsenal goalkeeper Dan Lewis, who knocked the ball into the net with his elbow. Lewis later blamed his new woollen jersey, saying that it was greasy. This inspired the Arsenal tradition of washing goalkeeper jerseys before every match. The press called the game the "Singing Final" and highlighted that the FA Cup had gone to Wales for the first time. In the ensuing years, Cardiff suffered a decline in their fortunes and did not reach the FA Cup final again until 2008.

== Route to the final ==
=== Cardiff City ===
Round	Opposition	Score	Venue	Ref
3rd	Aston Villa	2–1	Ninian Park (H)	
4th	Darlington	2–0	Feethams (A)	
5th	Bolton Wanderers	2–0	Burnden Park (A)	
Quarter-final	Chelsea	0–0	Stamford Bridge (A)	
Quarter-final (replay)	Chelsea	3–2	Ninian Park (H)	
Semi-final	Reading	3–0	Molineux Stadium (N)	

Cardiff City began its campaign for the 1926–27 FA Cup with a home game at Ninian Park in front of around 30,000 fans against fellow Football League First Division side Aston Villa in January 1927. After a goalless first half, Cardiff scored twice via a header by Len Davies and a shot by Ernie Curtis. Aston Villa managed to reply just once, when Cardiff goalkeeper Tom Farquharson scored an own goal after turning in a shot by Villa forward Arthur Dorrell. In the fourth round, Cardiff were drawn against Football League Second Division side Darlington. Newspaper reports indicated that Cardiff were the better team, and had it not been for the success of Darlington's defence they would have won by a greater margin. The goals were scored by George McLachlan and Hughie Ferguson.

In the fifth round, Cardiff were drawn away against Bolton Wanderers, the reigning FA Cup champions. In front of a crowd of 49,465 at Bolton's ground Burnden Park, Cardiff won by two goals to nil, the scorers being Ferguson and Davies. Following this round, Cardiff and Arsenal were the only remaining teams from the Football League First Division. After an initial goalless draw in the following round against Second Division Chelsea on 5 March, the two sides met again at Ninian Park in a replay five days later. Sam Irving put the Welsh team ahead after nine minutes, before Davies added a second after 21 minutes. Chelsea were awarded a penalty, but the shot by Andrew Wilson was saved by Farquharson. The goalkeeper had developed a reputation for saving penalty kicks by charging from his goalline as the shot was taken; this save from Wilson ultimately led to a rule change, prohibiting goalkeepers from rushing forward during a penalty. Chelsea scored twice in quick succession, Albert Thain with the first a minute before half-time but Bob Turnbull equalised, four minutes into the second half. Cardiff won through a penalty of their own; Harry Wilding handled the ball and Ferguson converted the penalty.

In the semi-finals Cardiff were drawn against Reading, who had reached the semi-final for the first time. As FA Cup semi-finals are held at neutral venues, the match was played at Molineux Stadium in Wolverhampton. Additional trains were put on to bring Cardiff fans to Wolverhampton for the match, and there was an expectation that the game would set a new attendance record for the ground. Heavy rain had fallen before the match, resulting in a soft pitch. Reading appeared stronger at the start, but in the 25th minute Bert Eggo failed to clear the ball from the Reading penalty area, allowing Ferguson to score for Cardiff. The remainder of the match was dominated by the Welsh. A further goal followed in the 35th minute from Harry Wake, sending Cardiff into half-time two goals ahead. Reading pressed on initially during the second half, but Cardiff gradually regained domination of play, and Ferguson scored his second of the game in the 70th minute. Cardiff's fans began to celebrate early, correctly believing that Reading could not come back from three goals down.

=== Arsenal ===
Round	Opposition	Score	Venue	Ref
3rd	Sheffield United	3–2	Bramall Lane (A)	
4th	Port Vale	2–2	Old Recreation Ground (A)	
4th (replay)	Port Vale	1–0	Arsenal Stadium (H)	
5th	Liverpool	2–0	Arsenal Stadium (H)	
Quarter-final	Wolverhampton Wanderers	2–1	Arsenal Stadium (H)	
Semi-final	Southampton	2–1	Stamford Bridge (N)	

Arsenal were drawn against a First Division opponent in the third round, meeting Sheffield United at Bramall Lane. Both teams scored early in the match, and three goals came in the space of six minutes. The first was the result of a scramble which ended when Jimmy Brain headed the ball into the net for Arsenal. United equalised through a header by Harry Johnson, but Arsenal went ahead once more after a goal by Charlie Buchan. David Mercer equalised again for Sheffield after 40 minutes, to keep the scores level going into half-time. Joe Hulme scored the winning goal for Arsenal in the 60th minute.

Arsenal were nearly eliminated from the competition in the following round when they played Second Division side Port Vale. After eight minutes, Tom Parker scored an own goal, putting Port Vale ahead. Buchan equalised for Arsenal early in the second half, but Port Vale went ahead once more with a goal by Wilf Kirkham via a rebounded shot after Dan Lewis saved the initial penalty. Arsenal chased a further equaliser, which came four minutes from time by Brain.

There were far fewer goals scored in the replay at Arsenal Stadium. A snow flurry left the ground muddy and the play was mostly limited to long balls. Brain hit the post in the first half, and the only goal of the game came shortly afterwards following a run by Buchan into the Port Vale box. Arsenal's remaining games were played in London. In the following round, they defeated Liverpool at home by two goals to nil, the same scoreline in team's league encounter earlier in the season; Liverpool had been unbeaten since New Year's Day. Both goals came as a result of indirect free kicks in rapid succession, the first a header by Brain, then another by Buchan which the goalkeeper could only clear after it had crossed the line.

In the quarter final against Wolverhampton Wanderers, Arsenal initially went down by a goal but an equaliser came from Billy Blyth after a further 15 minutes. Both teams had good attacks on goal throughout the rest of the game, but the only further goal came from a header by Hulme for Arsenal after a run and a cross from Jack Butler. The draw for the semi-final saw Arsenal play Southampton at Stamford Bridge. The muddy state of the pitch hampered the pace of the play shown by Arsenal, but both Buchan and Hulme scored for The Gunners to Southampton's single response by Bill Rawlings. Southampton were denied two penalty appeals.

== Pre-match ==
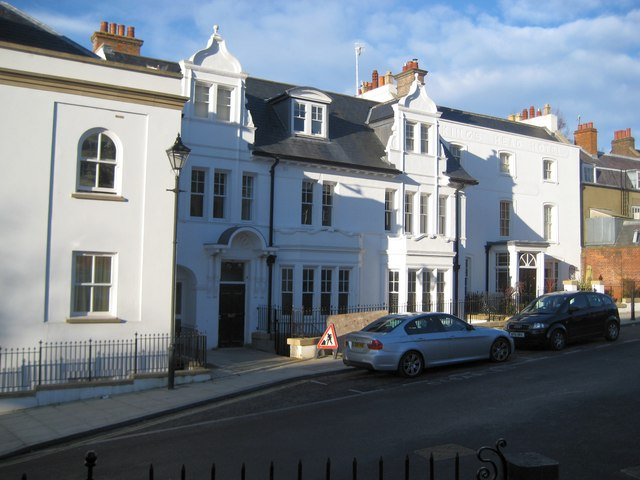
The former Kings Head Hotel in Harrow on the Hill in 2007, where the Cardiff City team spent their evening before the final.

Cardiff City had previously reached the semi-finals of the FA Cup twice, and two years earlier in 1925, they were defeated in the final. Arsenal had never reached a final previously so whoever won would take the trophy for the first time. Arsenal manager Herbert Chapman held a press conference on 21 April where he announced that Horace Cope was injured and would be unable to play at left back. He doubted whether Syd Hoar or Alf Baker would be available as both were still recovering from injury, and so he was leaving the selections for both the right half and outside left positions open should they become fit before the game. He saw Bill Seddon and Sam Haden as the alternatives should his first choice players not recover. When asked about who would win the game, he promised the press an answer after the match. Both Baker and Hoar were eventually named in the Arsenal team. The side trained at the Arsenal Stadium on their own pitch before the final. The players met at Hendon Hall Hotel on the morning of the match but their travel plans were disrupted when they became stuck in heavy traffic. Manager Herbert Chapman was forced to leave the coach to telephone local police for an escort; two motorcycle officers arrived to escort the team to the ground.

Cardiff City prepared for the final at Southport, Lancashire, at the Palace Hotel where the squad had stayed ahead of previous rounds. The players kept relaxed with massages, games of bowls and salt baths. On the day before the match, they travelled to Harrow on the Hill where they stayed at the Kings Head Hotel. They were open with the press about their tactics, saying they hoped to subdue Arsenal's attack by having Billy Hardy keep Buchan at bay. Hardy and Cardiff's defence were seen as a key part of the team's chances; ahead of the match, Buchan described them as "an impassable barrier". Cardiff were almost free to choose their first choice team. The only omission was Harry Wake, who had suffered damage to his kidneys in a league match against The Wednesday a week before the final. Other than Wake, their team was the same as that which played Reading in the semi-final. Ernie Curtis was selected as his replacement, becoming at the age of 19 the youngest player at the time to feature in an FA Cup final. Tom Farquharson, Jimmy Nelson, Fred Keenor and Billy Hardy had played in the 1925 final defeat.

Former Prime Minister of the United Kingdom, David Lloyd George, and future Prime Minister Winston Churchill (then Chancellor of Exchequer) were in attendance for the match. The press billed the match as England versus Wales, and noted that among the Welsh fans were many women, including mothers with babies. Special trains were laid on for the Cardiff fans, arriving at Paddington train station from 4 am onwards. The Metropolitan Railway put on additional trains to commute fans from Baker Street station to Wembley Park; one every two minutes. Between 11 am to kick off, 30,000 fans per hour travelled this route; some 100,000 fans were expected to arrive at the ground. The Welsh fans made special excursions across London; some travelled to St. Paul's Cathedral, where they sang Hen Wlad Fy Nhadau. Other fans went to The Cenotaph, Whitehall, where they dressed it in Welsh colours to honour the veterans of the First World War.

As the Cardiff team bus arrived at the stadium, the fans threw leeks at the vehicle. The team had adopted a black cat for the occasion, named Trixie, which had been found wandering astray by some of the players during a round of golf at the Royal Birkdale Golf Club before their earlier match with Bolton. They decided it was a good omen and Ferguson was sent to find the owners of the animal; they agreed to let the club keep the cat in return for two final tickets if they progressed that far. Police reinforcements were required at Empire Stadium, as at 1 pm a crowd of people had gathered outside the ticket office in a threatening manner. Many fake tickets had been sold to members of the crowd, and the stewards were refusing to allow them entry.

A community concert began inside stadium at 1:50 pm, led by the bands of the Grenadier and Irish Guards. Songs included "Abide with Me". This was the first time it had been formally performed at an FA Cup final. The hymn has a slightly older association with the FA Cup in that St Luke's Choir sang it as the crowds cleared the pitch ahead of the 1923 final. Supporters walking home to the East End after the 1923 match are also said to have sung the hymn. After 1927 it became a tradition to sing it before every final. Loud cheers were heard forty minutes later during the concert to celebrate the arrival of King George V. As the players entered the field, the King shook hands with each of them, as well as the officials: the referee William F. Bunnell from Preston, and the linesmen G.E. Watson from Kent and M. Brewitt from Lincoln. The match was the first cup final to be broadcast on the radio by the BBC. Commentary was provided by George Allison, who later went on to manage Arsenal, and Derek McCulloch. An illustration of the pitch divided into numbered squares was printed in the Radio Times to allow listeners to visualise the area of the pitch where play was taking place based on the commentators making reference to the squares. The broadcast has been credited with coining the phrase "back to square one"; square one in this context was an area nearest to one of the goals. Uses of the phrase have, however, been documented before the match. Nearly 92,000 fans attended the match; more than 300,000 originally applied for tickets.

== Match ==
=== Summary ===
Cardiff City captain Fred Keenor won the coin toss for his side, and so Ferguson kicked off the match. Shortly afterwards Arsenal won a free kick and the ball went into Cardiff's penalty area for the first time but was cleared by Tom Watson. Irving went on a run on the right side of the pitch, but Arsenal defender Andy Kennedy stopped the play. Arsenal attacked again, and Sloan dodged several tackles before a pass to Hoar caused the chance to break down as he had moved offside. A direct free kick was given to Arsenal shortly afterwards, but the shot by Parker from 25 yards (23 m) was saved by Farquharson for Cardiff. Combined play by Hulme and Buchan led to a corner, which then forced another three corners in a rapid succession. Arsenal could not capitalise on the opportunities and after the final corner the ball was shot a distance over the bar. The first half ended, Arsenal having dominated but the Cardiff City defence had stopped them each time. There was an incident in the crowd during the first half, at the 25th minute around 400 spectators outside the stadium rushed a gate being manned by four policemen. Reinforcements arrived and managed to push the crowd back when they reached the turnstiles.

Arsenal again went on the attack as the second half began, winning another corner following a header by Buchan. Hulme drifted in a well placed cross, but nothing was made of it. Cardiff's then attacked: Curtis sent in a low shot which was saved by Lewis in the Arsenal goal. Shortly afterwards, Butler, the Arsenal midfielder, was struck hard in the face by the ball causing a brief delay to play. The game resumed, and McLachlan attacked down the wing for Cardiff; he passed to Davies whose shot went just wide of the post. Buchan attempted to return the advantage to Arsenal with a long pass to the left wing for Hoar, but Cardiff City's Jimmy Nelson covered the move. City's attacking continued, and a shot from Hardy appeared to shake Lewis in goal as he did not gather the ball cleanly.

The only goal of the game followed shortly thereafter. Curtis went on a run for Cardiff before passing it forward near the box to Ferguson. He shot the ball towards the goal, but it had little power and was easily picked up by Lewis. As he did so, the ball squirmed out of Lewis' hands and slipped in between the crook of his left elbow and body. With Cardiff forwards closing in, Lewis tried to reclaim the ball but only succeeded in knocking it into the net with his elbow. Arsenal sought to attack immediately after the kick off, but the move faltered when Brain was caught offside. Cardiff countered, and possibly could have had a second goal, but Curtis chose to shoot himself rather than pass to Davies, who would have been presented with an open goal as Lewis was out of position. The match ended with a victory for Cardiff City by one goal to nil. The King presented the trophy to Cardiff's captain Keenor, and medals to each of the players from both teams.

=== Details ===
23 April 1927
15:00 BST

Cardiff City	1–0	Arsenal
Ferguson 74'

Wembley Stadium, London
Attendance: 91,206
Referee: William F. Bunnell (Lancashire)

Cardiff City	Arsenal

GK	(Republic of Ireland) Tom Farquharson
DF	(Scotland) Jimmy Nelson
DF	(Northern Ireland) Tom Watson
HB	(Wales) Fred Keenor (c)
HB	(Northern Ireland) Tom Sloan
HB	(England) Billy Hardy
OR	(Wales) Ernie Curtis
IR	(Northern Ireland) Sam Irving
CF	(Scotland) Hughie Ferguson
IL	(Wales) Len Davies
OL	(Scotland) George McLachlan
Manager:
(England) Fred Stewart

GK	(Wales) Dan Lewis
DF	(England) Tom Parker
DF	(Northern Ireland) Andy Kennedy
HB	(England) Alf Baker
HB	(England) Jack Butler
HB	(Wales) Bob John
OR	(England) Joe Hulme
IR	(England) Charles Buchan (c)
CF	(England) Jimmy Brain
IL	(Scotland) Billy Blyth
OL	(England) Syd Hoar
Manager:
(England) Herbert Chapman

== Post match and aftermath ==
The Cardiff City victory in the 1927 FA Cup Final remains the only time that the trophy has been won by a team outside England. At the time it had been widely referred to as the "English Cup". This was a highlight of the coverage in the press afterwards, the Daily Mirror using the headline "How England's Football Cup Went to Wales", as was the volume of singing that took place during the proceedings. An article in the Hull Daily Mail even went as far as to suggest that the match would be remembered for the singing specifically, calling it the "Singing Final". There was an open air radio broadcast of the match in Cathays Park attended by 15,000 fans, and after the victory the team's colours were strung throughout the city, and local shopkeepers made replicas of the trophy out of butter to display in shop windows. Cardiff goalkeeper Tom Farquharson, who became the first Irish goalkeeper to win the FA Cup, acquired the match ball after the game and donated it to his church, which subsequently auctioned it for funds. The ball is now stored at the Welsh Sports Hall of Fame at St Fagans National Museum of History.

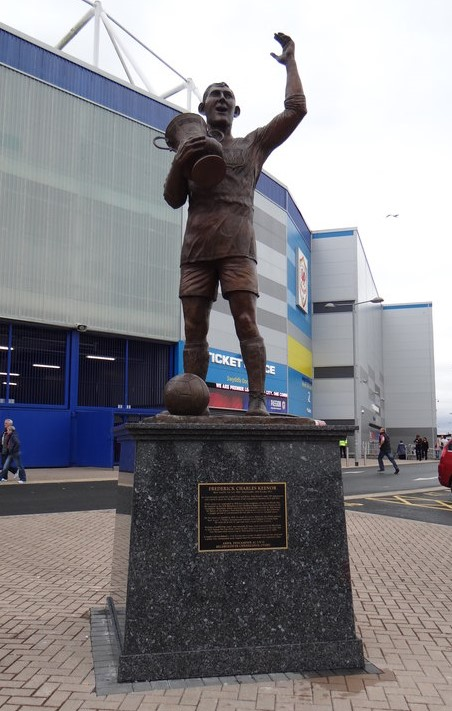
A statue of Cardiff City captain Fred Keenor with the FA Cup located at the Cardiff City Stadium

After the match, the Cardiff team headed to the Palace Hotel in Bloomsbury for a celebratory dinner with their wives before heading to Windsor and Eton College on the following day. They toured the college, and some of the players visited Windsor Castle and Kempton Park Racecourse. They headed back to Cardiff later that day from Paddington station, finding themselves delayed at several stations en route as fans flooded platforms at Reading, Swindon and Newport to see the team. They eventually arrived in Cardiff at 6:35 pm. The team were mobbed at the station with some of the crowd breaking through a police cordon at the entrance before crossing railway lines to greet the players on the platform. When the team disembarked, they were met by motor coaches and a band, and driven to the City Hall. Some 150,000 fans lined the streets of Cardiff to welcome the team back home. After leading some communal singing outside the City Hall, the team and their wives attended a dinner and dance in the building. While some press reports claimed that Keenor had said that the team were lucky to have won, he refuted the claim, saying that Cardiff's defence had led them to victory. In 2012, a statue of Keenor lifting the FA Cup trophy was erected outside the club's Cardiff City Stadium in commemoration of his side's victory.

The Arsenal goalkeeper Lewis blamed a new jersey for the mistake that resulted in the goal, saying that the wool was greasy and allowed the ball to slip from his grip. As tradition ever since, Arsenal goalkeepers have always washed their jerseys before each game. The Cardiff captain Keenor later commented on his view of the goal: "He (Ferguson) put such a spin on it that it would have been difficult for the 'keeper to have saved cleanly. The ball twisted in his hands, bounced onto his chest and curled back into the net. Len Davies was challenging and I think Lewis took his eye off the ball for a fatal second as he went down for it". When presented with his runner-up medal after the game, Lewis was reported to have thrown the award away before it was recovered by his teammates. Lewis was even accused by some supporters of deliberately throwing the game to allow a side from his home nation to win the competition.

The Arsenal captain, Buchan, praised the Cardiff team saying "My congratulations to Cardiff City on being the first club in history to take the Cup out of England. We did our very utmost to prevent them from doing so, but we did not succeed. As, however, the trophy is gone to Cardiff, there is no one who more heartily congratualtes them than the captain of the losers. Cardiff played an honest, clean game, each member of the team obviously striving to do his utmost and my final words are good luck to the City and good luck to Wales and its association football now that they have the Cup."

Less than a fortnight later, Cardiff beat Rhyl 2–0 in the final of the Welsh Cup to claim an unprecedented transnational cup double. Cardiff also qualified for 1927 FA Charity Shield, defeating amateur team Corinthian by two goals to one with the winning goal once again by Ferguson. They also adopted triangular corner flags to commemorate the win. Ferguson returned to his native Scotland two years later, joining Dundee. He sank into depression after struggling to find form and committed suicide less than three years after his winning goal in the 1927 final. Cardiff's fortunes declined quickly afterwards. Within four years of the final, they had been relegated to the Football League Third Division South. Keenor remained captain during this period, and left the club after 19 years to transfer to Crewe Alexandra during the 1930–31 season. In 1934, Cardiff slipped further and were required to petition the Football Association to allow them to remain in the league after they finished last and were eligible to be removed from the competition. Cardiff's Ernie Curtis, who died in November 1992 at the age of 85, was the last surviving player from the final. He had been the youngest player in the match, aged 19 years and 317 days. Cardiff reached the FA Cup Final once more in 2008, where they lost by one goal to nil against Portsmouth.

Arsenal returned to the FA Cup Final in 1930, when they played Huddersfield Town, the former team of Arsenal's manager Herbert Chapman. They won the match by two goals to nil, marking the first major trophy to be won by the team. This began a period of success for the club, with two back-to-back league titles, first under Chapman and then under George Allison after Chapman's death. A further victory in the FA Cup followed in 1936 against Sheffield United.
