= William Devlin (footballer, born 1899) =

Scottish footballer

Personal information
- Full name: William Alexander Devlin
- Date of birth: 30 July 1899
- Place of birth: Bellshill, Scotland
- Date of death: 23 July 1972 (aged 72)
- Place of death: Glasgow, Scotland
- Position: Centre forward

Senior career*
Years	Team	Apps	(Gls)
1920–1921	Vale of Clyde		
1921–1922	Clyde	10	(2)
1921–1922	→ King's Park (loan)	13	(19)
1922–1926	Cowdenbeath	135	(118)
1926–1927	Huddersfield Town	32	(14)
1927	Liverpool	19	(15)
1927–1928	Heart of Midlothian	15	(12)
1928–1929	Macclesfield	23	(18)
1929–1930	Cowdenbeath	20	(5)
1930–1931	Mansfield Town		
1931	Burton Town		
1931	Shelbourne		
1931–1932	Macclesfield	0	(0)
1932	Bangor City		
1932–1933	Marseille		
1933–1934	Boston United		
1934–1935	Ashton National		
1935–1936	Marseille		
- FC Zürich
- * Club domestic league appearances and goals

William Alexander Devlin (30 July 1899 – 23 July 1972) was a Scottish professional footballer, best remembered for his two spells as a centre forward in the Scottish League with Cowdenbeath, for whom he scored 123 goals in 155 appearances. He also played for Scottish League clubs Heart of Midlothian, King's Park, Clyde and for Football League clubs Huddersfield Town and Liverpool.

== Personal life ==
Devlin's brother Tom was also a footballer.

== Career statistics ==
Appearances and goals by club, season and competition
Club	Season	League			National Cup		Other		Total	
Club	Season	Division	Apps	Goals	Apps	Goals	Apps	Goals	Apps	Goals
Clyde	1921–22	Scottish First Division	9	2	—		—		9	2
Clyde	1922–23	Scottish First Division	1	0	—		—		1	0
Clyde	Total		10	2	—		—		10	2
King's Park (loan)	1921–22	Scottish Second Division	13	19	3	2	—		16	21
Cowdenbeath	1922–23	Scottish Second Division	31	20	2	4	—		33	24
Cowdenbeath	1923–24	Scottish Second Division	36	25	2	2	—		38	27
Cowdenbeath	1924–25	Scottish First Division	38	33	1	0	—		39	33
Cowdenbeath	1925–26	Scottish First Division	30	40	1	0	—		31	40
Cowdenbeath	Total		135	118	6	6	—		141	124
Huddersfield Town	1925–26	First Division	4	4	—		—		4	4
Huddersfield Town	1926–27	First Division	28	10	0	0	—		28	10
Huddersfield Town	Total		32	14	0	0	—		32	14
Liverpool	1926–27	First Division	1	1	0	0	—		1	1
Liverpool	1927–28	First Division	18	14	0	0	—		18	14
Liverpool	Total		19	15	0	0	—		19	15
Heart of Midlothian	1927–28	Scottish First Division	15	12	2	2	1 (Note: Appearance in Dunedin Cup)	0	18	14
Macclesfield	1928–29	Cheshire League	23	18	0	0	1 (Note: Appearance in Cheshire Senior Cup)	1	24	19
Cowdenbeath	1929–30	Scottish First Division	20	5	2	1	—		22	6
Macclesfield	1931–32	Cheshire League	0	0	2	1	0	0	2	1
Boston United	1933–34	Midland League	1	0	0	0	1	0	2	0
Career total			268	203	12	10	3	1	283	214

== Honours ==
Cowdenbeath

- Scottish League Second Division second-place promotion: 1923–24

Individual

- Scottish League First Division top scorer (2): 1924–25, 1925–26
- Cowdenbeath Hall of Fame
