= Nathan B. Scott =

American politician (1842–1924)

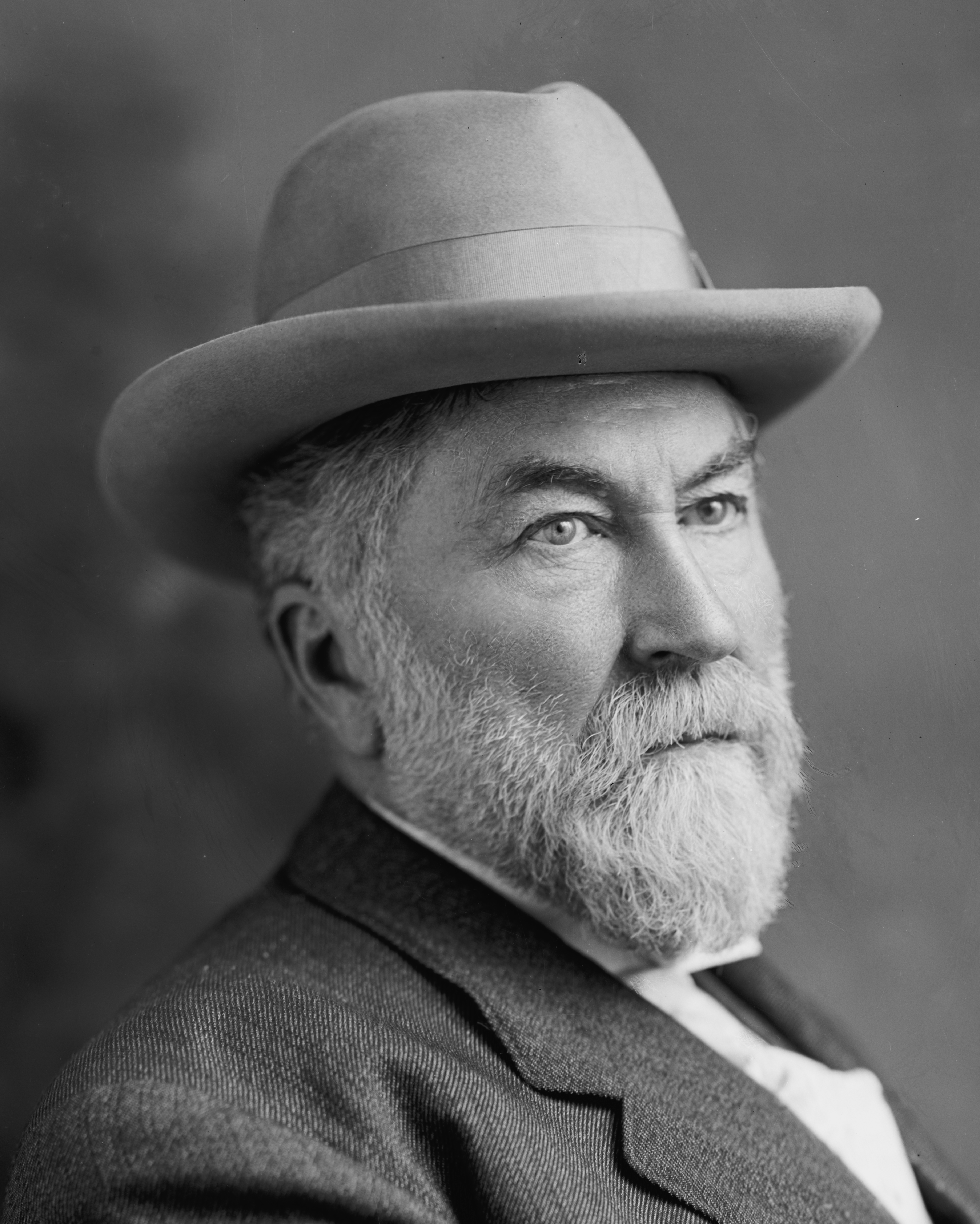

United States Senator from West Virginia
- In office March 4, 1899 – March 3, 1911
- Preceded by: Charles J. Faulkner
- Succeeded by: William E. Chilton

15th Commissioner of Internal Revenue
- In office January 1, 1898 – February 28, 1899
- President: William McKinley
- Preceded by: William St. John Forman
- Succeeded by: George W. Wilson

Member of the West Virginia Senate
- In office 1883–1890

Personal details
- Born: Nathan Bay Scott; December 18, 1842 Quaker City, Ohio, U.S.
- Died: January 2, 1924 (aged 81) Washington, D.C., U.S.
- Resting place: Rock Creek Cemetery; Washington, D.C., U.S.
- Party: Republican

Nathan Bay Scott (December 18, 1842 – January 2, 1924) was a United States senator from West Virginia.

== Biography ==
Born near Quaker City, Ohio, he attended the common schools and engaged in mining near Colorado Springs, Colorado from 1859 to 1862. During the Civil War, he entered the Union Army in 1863 as a corporal and was appointed sergeant in 1864, promoted to regimental commissary sergeant in 1865, and mustered out in 1865. After the war, he engaged in the manufacture of glass in Wheeling, West Virginia and also engaged in banking. He was a member and president of the city council from 1881 to 1883. From 1883 to 1890, he was a member of the West Virginia Senate and, in 1888, he was a member of the Republican National Committee.

Scott was appointed Commissioner of Internal Revenue by President William McKinley in 1898, and served until February 1899, when he resigned to become a U.S. Senator; he had been elected as a Republican in 1899 and was reelected in 1905, serving from March 4, 1899 to March 3, 1911. He was an unsuccessful candidate for renomination. While in the Senate, he was chairman of the Committee on Mines and Mining (Fifty-seventh through Fifty-ninth Congresses) and a member of the Committee on Public Buildings and Grounds (Fifty-ninth through Sixty-first Congresses). Scott was appointed a member of the Lincoln Memorial Commission in 1911 and engaged in banking in Washington, D.C. until his death in 1924.

On August 3, 1918, when Scott and his family were at their home, they were exposed to a cloud of toxic lewisite after an accident occurred at a nearby US army chemical weapons research facility. Scott and his family immediately entered the house, closed all the windows and phoned for help. The senator’s throat and eyes were burned and his face was blistered. His quick action of entering the house and closing the windows probably saved his family’s life. The senator complained vigorously, prompting an official investigation of the accident.

He died in Washington on January 2, 1924. His remains were cremated and the ashes deposited in a mausoleum in Rock Creek Cemetery, Washington, D.C.

U.S. Senate
Preceded by Charles J. Faulkner	Class 1 Senator from West Virginia; 1899–1911	Succeeded by William E. Chilton
