= Triangular corner flags in English football =

Football flags

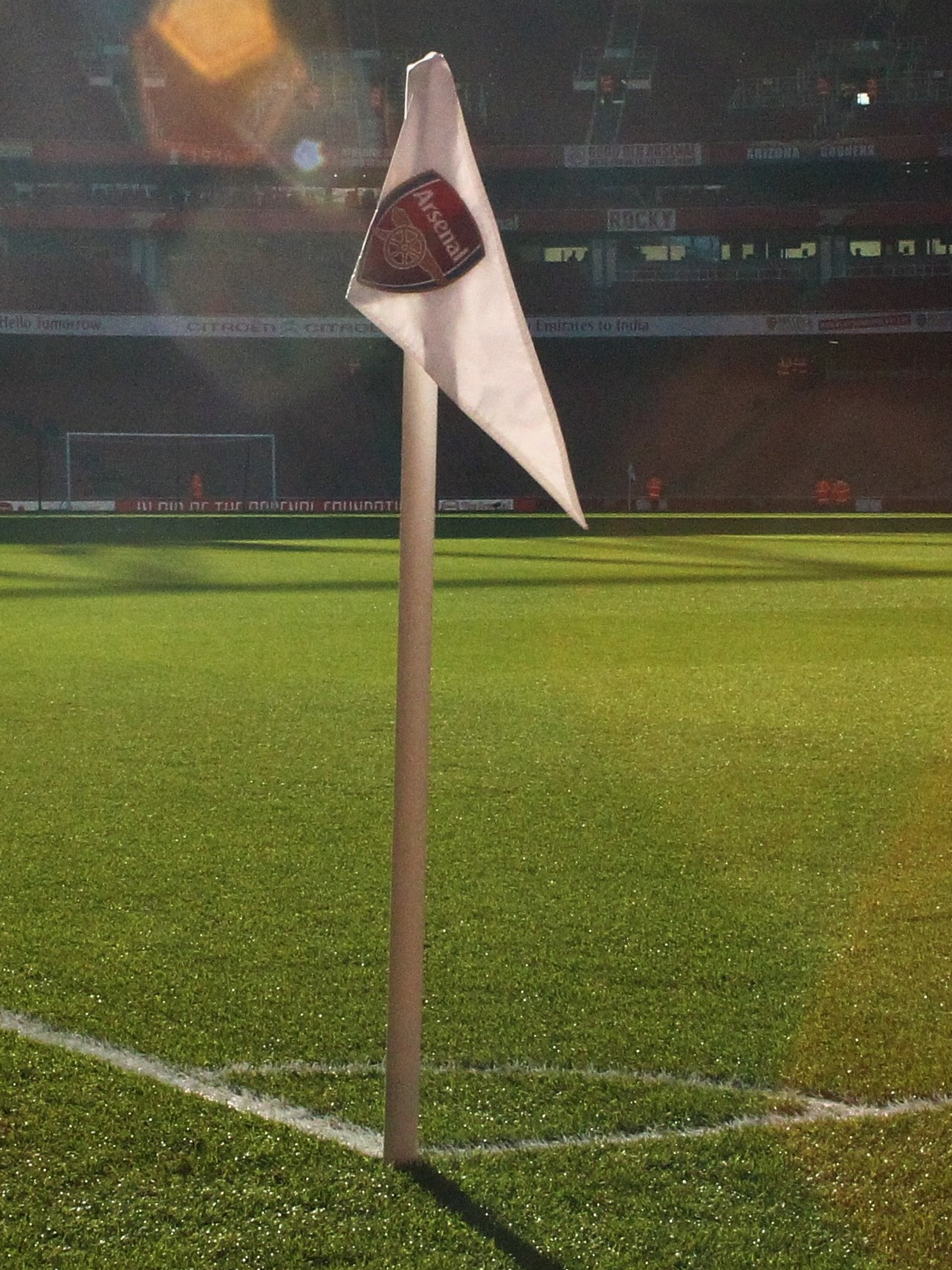
A triangular corner flag at Arsenal's Emirates Stadium

The use of triangular corner flags in English football is a regular occurrence based upon traditional achievements. Tradition holds that only clubs that have won the FA Cup have the right to use triangular corner flags rather than the regular square ones. However, this tradition has no basis in The Football Association's (FA) regulations and clubs are free to decide what shape of flags they use.

== History ==
The origin for the tradition is unknown; however, one possible explanation came that Cardiff City after winning the 1927 FA Cup Final adopted triangular corner flags to commemorate the victory as well as reminding their South Wales derby rivals Swansea City of this. From then on, it became an accepted tradition that only winners of the FA Cup would be entitled to use triangular corner flags. This theory was popularised in the 1997 film Twin Town. While a number of FA Cup-winning clubs including Arsenal and Aston Villa do use triangular corner flags, some such as Liverpool do not. AFC Wimbledon use triangular corner flags despite never winning the FA Cup, as they view themselves as the successors of Wimbledon F.C., who did.

The tradition has no legal basis in the FA's regulations. Indeed, most clubs did not even make an order to start using triangular flags as it was often left up to the club's groundsmen who made the decision. Former English referee David Elleray in his capacity as the technical director of the International Football Association Board stated there is freedom with regard to how clubs chose to select their corner flags. However, newspapers have erroneously asserted that triangular corner flags are a right for FA Cup winners only. Likewise it is a common question in pub quizzes which incorrectly assert the tradition is a right.

== See also ==
- List of common misconceptions#Sports
