= Billy Mercer (footballer, born 1888) =

English footballer

Personal information
- Full name: William Henry Mercer
- Date of birth: 27 May 1888
- Place of birth: Prescot, England
- Date of death: 5 June 1956 (aged 68)
- Place of death: Worthing, England
- Height: 5 ft 10 1/2 in (1.79 m)
- Position: Goalkeeper

Senior career*
Years	Team	Apps	(Gls)
1908–1909	Grosvenor		
1909–	Prescot		
–1914	Prescot Athletic		
1914–1924	Hull City	193	(0)
1924–1928	Huddersfield Town	71	(0)
1928–1929	Blackpool	19	(0)
- * Club domestic league appearances and goals

William Henry Mercer (27 May 1888 – 5 June 1956) was an English professional footballer who played as a goalkeeper in the Football League for Hull City, Huddersfield Town and Blackpool. An all-round sportsman, he notably played for Hull Cricket Club and was a prominent snooker player in Yorkshire.

== Personal life ==
Mercer's brother Peter was 1947 National Bowls champion. Mercer served in the Royal Engineers during the First World War and was demobilised in December 1919. Mercer operated a billiard hall in west Hull during the 1930s and 1940s, but by 1948, he was suffering health issues due to mustard gas poisoning he had suffered in 1917, during the course of his war service. Mercer moved to live with his brother Peter in Worthing and died there of a heart complaint in 1956.

== Career statistics ==
Appearances and goals by club, season and competition
Club	Season	League			FA Cup		Total	
Club	Season	Division	Apps	Goals	Apps	Goals	Apps	Goals
Hull City	1914–15	Second Division	1	0	0	0	1	0
Hull City	1919–20	Second Division	17	0	0	0	17	0
Hull City	1920–21	Second Division	42	0	5	0	47	0
Hull City	1921–22	Second Division	42	0	2	0	44	0
Hull City	1922–23	Second Division	39	0	1	0	40	0
Hull City	1923–24	Second Division	40	0	2	0	42	0
Hull City	1924–25	Second Division	12	0	―		12	0
Hull City	Total		193	0	10	0	203	0
Huddersfield Town	1924–25	First Division	27	0	1	0	28	0
Huddersfield Town	1925–26	First Division	13	0	0	0	13	0
Huddersfield Town	1926–27	First Division	8	0	0	0	8	0
Huddersfield Town	1927–28	First Division	23	0	7	0	30	0
Huddersfield Town	Total		71	0	8	0	79	0
Career total			264	0	18	0	282	0

== Honours ==
Huddersfield Town

- Football League First Division: 1924–25, 1925–26
- FA Cup runner-up: 1927–28
