= Arthur Hutchins =

English footballer

Personal information
- Date of birth: 15 September 1890
- Place of birth: Bishop's Waltham, Hampshire, England
- Date of death: 1948 (aged 57–58)
- Height: 5 ft 10 in (1.78 m)
- Position: Left back

Senior career*
Years	Team	Apps	(Gls)
?–1919	Croydon Common		
1919–1923	Arsenal	104	(1)
1923–1926	Charlton Athletic		
- * Club domestic league appearances and goals

Arthur Hutchins (15 September 1890 – 1948) was an English professional footballer.

Hutchins was born in Bishop's Waltham, Hampshire and first played for Croydon Common before the outbreak of World War I. During the war he guested as a player for Arsenal, playing over 100 wartime matches, and after peace broke out, he signed as a permanent player in April 1919, as Arsenal were promoted back into the Football League First Division. He made his league debut against Sunderland at Roker Park on 13 September 1919 and became Arsenal's regular left back during the 1919-20 season, taking over from Frank Bradshaw who had moved up front to become an inside forward.

Hutchins was a first-team stalwart for 1920-21 and 1921-22, missing only three and five games in each season respectively. However, he only played ten games in 1922-23 before being dropped for Andy Kennedy. Unable to regain his place, Hutchins moved to Charlton Athletic in July 1923. In total he played 108 games for Arsenal, scoring one goal.

He spent three seasons with Charlton, of the Third Division South, before retiring in 1926. He died in 1948, aged 57.

== Sources ==
- Harris, Jeff (1995). Hogg, Tony (ed.). Arsenal Who's Who. Independent UK Sports. ISBN 1-899429-03-4.
