= George Clifford Wilson =

English cricketer

George Clifford Wilson (27 July 1902 – 18 May 1957) was an English first-class cricketer who followed his father, the more accomplished George Alfred Wilson, into a career as a right-arm fast bowler (and right-handed batsman at the bottom of the order) with Worcestershire.

Born in Kidderminster, Wilson made his first-class debut in the local derby with Warwickshire at Edgbaston in May of the 1924 season, but did little, bowling only three overs and making nought in his only innings. The match was notable both for a hat-trick by Worcestershire's Charles Preece and for the county's desperate but ultimately successful struggle for a draw, having been reduced to 48/8 in their second innings when stumps were drawn.

He also went wicketless in his second match, but took 2-7 in the second innings of his third. Wilson played a full part in the 1924 County Championship campaign, playing in 20 of Worcestershire's 24 games as well as one against the touring South Africans and finishing with 38 wickets at an average of a little under 24 runs apiece. The following summer brought him his first five-wicket haul: 5-67 against Hampshire in August; and 44 wickets in all.

By some way Wilson's most successful season was his last, 1926. He took 68 first-class wickets in total, and five or more in an innings on seven occasions, this latter figure being second only to Fred Root in the Worcestershire side that year. In the space of one August week he took five wickets in each innings - his only ten-wicket match haul - against Derbyshire on his home ground at Kidderminster, then claimed his best innings figures of 8-81 in a drawn game against Somerset at Weston-super-Mare.

Wilson played his final match in early September 1926 against Middlesex, but bad weather meant that little play was possible and he did not take a wicket. He died in Elswick, Newcastle upon Tyne, at the age of 54, nearly five years before his father.
