= Charles Preece =

English cricketer

Personal information
- Full name: Charles Richard Preece
- Born: 15 December 1888; Broadheath, Worcestershire, England
- Died: 5 February 1976 (aged 87); Oldbury, West Midlands , England
- Batting: Right-handed
- Bowling: Right arm medium

Domestic team information
- Years: Team
- 1920–1929: Lancashire

Career statistics
Competition	FC
Matches	89
Runs scored	1,601
Batting average	11.60
100s/50s	0/2
Top score	69
Balls bowled	8,081
Wickets	140
Bowling average	29.81
5 wickets in innings	5
10 wickets in match	0
Best bowling	7-35
Catches/stumpings	52/0
- Source: CricketArchive, 24 June 2008

Charles Richard Preece (15 December 1888 – 5 February 1976) was an English cricketer, who played 88 first-class games for Worcestershire in the 1920s. He also made one appearance for HK Foster's XI in 1919.

Almost all of Preece's matches for Worcestershire came in the period between 1920 and 1924. Although he played quite regularly during this period, he never had more than moderate success, his highest season's aggregate of wickets being 42 (at 30.11) in 1920. He claimed five wickets in an innings on four occasions, the best of these being the 7-35 he achieved against Essex at Leyton in 1921. It was to prove in vain, however: Essex, having been bowled out for 90 in their first innings, reached 560 in their second and won by 132 runs.

Preece ceased to play regular first-class cricket after the 1924 season, but after a five-year gap, he returned to the Worcestershire side in 1929 for a one-off appearance against Nottinghamshire at Trent Bridge. He did little of note in this match: in a heavy defeat to a side containing Larwood and Voce, he scored 10 and 11 near the bottom of the order, bowled three wicketless overs for 24 and held a single catch.
