= Dai Evans (footballer, born 1902) =

Welsh footballer

Personal information
- Full name: David Evans
- Date of birth: 28 January 1902
- Place of birth: Abercanaid, Merthyr Tydfil, Wales
- Date of death: 15 December 1951 1951 (aged 48–49)
- Place of death: Sully, Glamorgan, Wales
- Position: Defender

Senior career*
Years	Team	Apps	(Gls)
1921–1922	Merthyr Town	0	(0)
1922–1923	Nelson	0	(0)
1923–1924	Bolton Wanderers	0	(0)
1924–1928	Reading	122	(11)
1928–1929	Huddersfield Town	18	(0)
1929–1930	Bury	19	(0)
Total		149	(11)

International career
1926–1928	Wales	4	(0)
- * Club domestic league appearances and goals

David "Dai" Evans (28 January 1902 – 1951) was a professional footballer who played as a left half in the 1920s. He played for a number of teams in the English Football League, including Reading, Huddersfield Town and Bury.

He also won four caps for Wales, the first of which was against Ireland on 13 February 1926.

He was known as 'Dai Gethin' after the pub owned by his parents.
