= George Wilson (footballer, born 1912) =

English footballer

Personal information
- Full name: George T. Wilson
- Date of birth: 1912
- Place of birth: Hull, England
- Height: 5 ft 10 1/2 in (1.79 m)
- Position: Goalkeeper

Senior career*
Years	Team	Apps	(Gls)
- Dreghorn
–1933	Galston		
1933–1935	Ayr United	24	(0)
1935–1936	York City	39	(0)
Total		63	(0)
- * Club domestic league appearances and goals

George T. Wilson (1912 – ?) was an English professional footballer who played as a goalkeeper in Scottish football for Dreghorn, Galston and Ayr United and in the Football League for York City.
