= Tom Wade (footballer) =

English footballer

Personal information
- Full name: Thomas Wade
- Date of birth: 1909
- Place of birth: Leeds, England
- Position: Defender

Senior career*
Years	Team	Apps	(Gls)
1929–1930	Huddersfield Town	1	(0)
- Darlington
- * Club domestic league appearances and goals

Thomas Wade (born in 1909) was a professional footballer who played as a defender for Huddersfield Town & Darlington.
