= George Alfred Wilson =

English cricketer

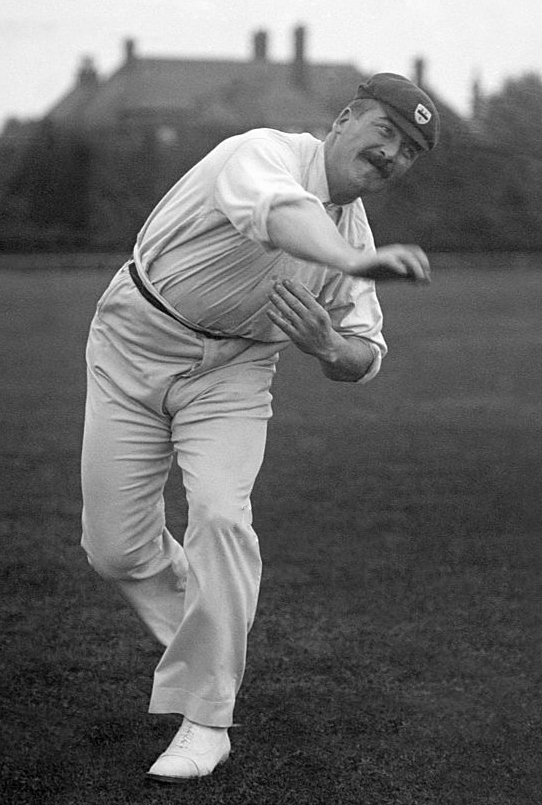

Personal information
- Full name: George Alfred Wilson
- Born: 5 April 1877; Amersham, Buckinghamshire, England
- Died: 3 March 1962 (aged 84); Abbots Langley, Hertfordshire, England
- Batting: Right-handed
- Bowling: Right-arm fast
- Relatives: Cliff Wilson (son)

Domestic team information
- Years: Team
- 1898–1906: Worcestershire
- 1907–1908: Buckinghamshire
- 1912–1914: Staffordshire

Career statistics
Competition	First-class
Matches	160
Runs scored	2,238
Batting average	11.36
100s/50s	–/5
Top score	78
Balls bowled	33,212
Wickets	732
Bowling average	24.06
5 wickets in innings	58
10 wickets in match	18
Best bowling	9/75
Catches/stumpings	57/–
- Source: Cricinfo, 23 March 2019

George Alfred Wilson (5 April 1877 – 3 March 1962) was an English cricketer, a right-arm fast bowler and right-handed batsman who was the first man to take a wicket for Worcestershire County Cricket Club after they attained first-class status for the 1899 season.

Born in Amersham, Buckinghamshire, Wilson opened the bowling in Worcestershire's very first County Championship match against Yorkshire on 4 May 1899, and made his mark at once by dismissing England batsman Jack Brown before Yorkshire had scored a run. He continued in the same vein, finishing with an outstanding debut innings return of 8–70, although he was less successful (2–69) in the second innings and Worcestershire were defeated by 11 runs thanks to 6–19 from John Brown.

Wilson enjoyed a fine first season in first-class cricket, finishing with 92 wickets at 22.46, including 8–46 in Worcestershire's first win, against Oxford University and eight wickets in the match in their first Championship win, against Leicestershire in late July. He also played twice against the touring Australians: once for an England XI, when he took only one wicket (that of Victor Trumper), and once for a Midland Counties side, for whom he was more successful and picked up five wickets in the game.

In 1900, Wilson passed 100 wickets for the first time, a feat he was to repeat in 1901 and 1902, his best being 122 wickets in 1901. The 1900 season also saw him make his highest score of 78 against London County, batting at number 11 and adding 97 for the last wicket with Albert Bird; while in 1901, he played in a Rest of England side against Yorkshire, a game in which Gilbert Jessop scored 233 for the Rest of England in about two and a half hours. In these three summers combined, Wilson took five or more wickets in an innings on 30 occasions.

From 1903 onwards, Wilson's effectiveness steadily declined; indeed, after 1901, he took fewer wickets each summer until his retirement five years later. However, he remained good enough to be selected for the Players of the South against Gentlemen of the South in 1903, while the following year he achieved career-best innings figures of 9–75 against Oxford University.

In 1906 Wilson's season's bowling average, which with the exception of 1904 had remained in the low twenties throughout his career, ballooned to 36.09, and at the end of that season he retired from first-class cricket. He died in Abbots Langley, Hertfordshire, just over a month short of his 85th birthday.

His son, George Clifford Wilson, played 70 times for Worcestershire between 1924 and 1926.
