= Jacky Slicer =

English footballer

Personal information
- Full name: John Slicer
- Date of birth: 24 November 1902
- Place of birth: Bramley, England
- Position: Midfielder

Senior career*
Years	Team	Apps	(Gls)
1926–1927	Huddersfield Town	7	(2)
- Norwich City
- * Club domestic league appearances and goals

John "Jacky" Slicer (born 24 November 1902) was a professional footballer, who played for Huddersfield Town and Norwich City.
