= Horace Cope =

English footballer (1899–1961)

Personal information
- Date of birth: 24 May 1899
- Place of birth: Treeton, West Riding of Yorkshire, England
- Date of death: 4 October 1961 (aged 62)
- Position: Left back

Senior career*
Years	Team	Apps	(Gls)
1919–1926	Notts County		
1926–1933	Arsenal	100	(16)
1933–1936	Bristol Rovers		
- * Club domestic league appearances and goals

Horace Cope (24 May 1899 – 4 October 1961) was an English footballer who played at left back.

Cope spent six years at Arsenal after joining from Notts County for £3,125 in December 1926. He was a regular in his first two-and-a-half seasons at the club. In total, he made 76 starts at Arsenal, but missed the club's 1927 FA Cup Final defeat to Cardiff through injury after playing most of the season. He joined Bristol Rovers for £1,500 in July 1933.

== Honours ==
=== As a player ===
Arsenal

- FA Cup finalist — 1927
