= Alf Baker =

English footballer (1898–1955)

Personal information
- Full name: Alfred Baker
- Date of birth: 27 April 1898
- Place of birth: Ilkeston, Derbyshire, England
- Date of death: 1 April 1955 (aged 56)
- Height: 5 ft 8 in (1.73 m)
- Positions: Right-half; right-back

Senior career*
Years	Team	Apps	(Gls)
–1919	Eastwood Rangers		
1919–1931	Arsenal	310	(23)

International career
1927	England	1	(0)
- * Club domestic league appearances and goals

Alfred Baker (27 April 1898 – April 1955) was an English footballer.

== Playing career ==
Born in Ilkeston, Derbyshire, Baker was originally a miner and played for various clubs in Derbyshire as an amateur, including Eastwood Rangers. During World War I he guested for Chesterfield, Crystal Palace and Huddersfield Town, although these appearances are not considered official. In 1919 he turned professional and signed for Arsenal; according to club legend, Arsenal manager Leslie Knighton signed Baker after meeting him at the pit where he worked, thus beating rivals for the player's signature who were waiting at his home.

He made his debut for Arsenal against Newcastle United on 13 August 1919 (which was Arsenal's first-ever top flight game at Highbury). Baker played seventeen matches that season, but in 1920-21 he became a first-team regular; he also had trials for England, though it would be another seven years before he won a cap.

A Utility player, "Doughy" (as he was nicknamed) played in every position for Arsenal, including as an emergency goalkeeper on several occasions, though usually played as right half. He was made club captain in 1924. In the 1924-25 season, Baker won two Football League representative caps and also played in the Charity Shield, which was a Professionals v. Amateurs match; the Professionals won 3–1. However, when new manager Herbert Chapman arrived at the end of that season, he made Charlie Buchan captain instead of Baker; Baker continued to play for Arsenal for another five years, though.

In 1927, Baker played in Arsenal's first ever FA Cup final; however Arsenal suffered an infamous 1–0 loss to Cardiff City after a mistake by Arsenal goalkeeper Dan Lewis. The following season, he was finally capped for England, appearing against Wales on 28 November 1927; England lost 2–1. It was his only international appearance.

Baker finally won a major medal when he played in Arsenal's 1930 FA Cup final win over Huddersfield Town; by now he had nearly reached the end of his career. He played only one more game for the club (also against Huddersfield, on 7 March 1931) before retiring from the game aged 33 in the summer of 1931. In all, he played 351 matches for Arsenal, scoring 26 goals.

== Personal life ==
His brother Jim Baker was also a footballer who played for Leeds United. Baker later worked for Arsenal as a scout. He died in 1955, at the age of 56.

== Honours ==
Arsenal

- FA Cup: 1929–30; runner-up: 1926–27
