= FA Cup final =

Football association cup championship game

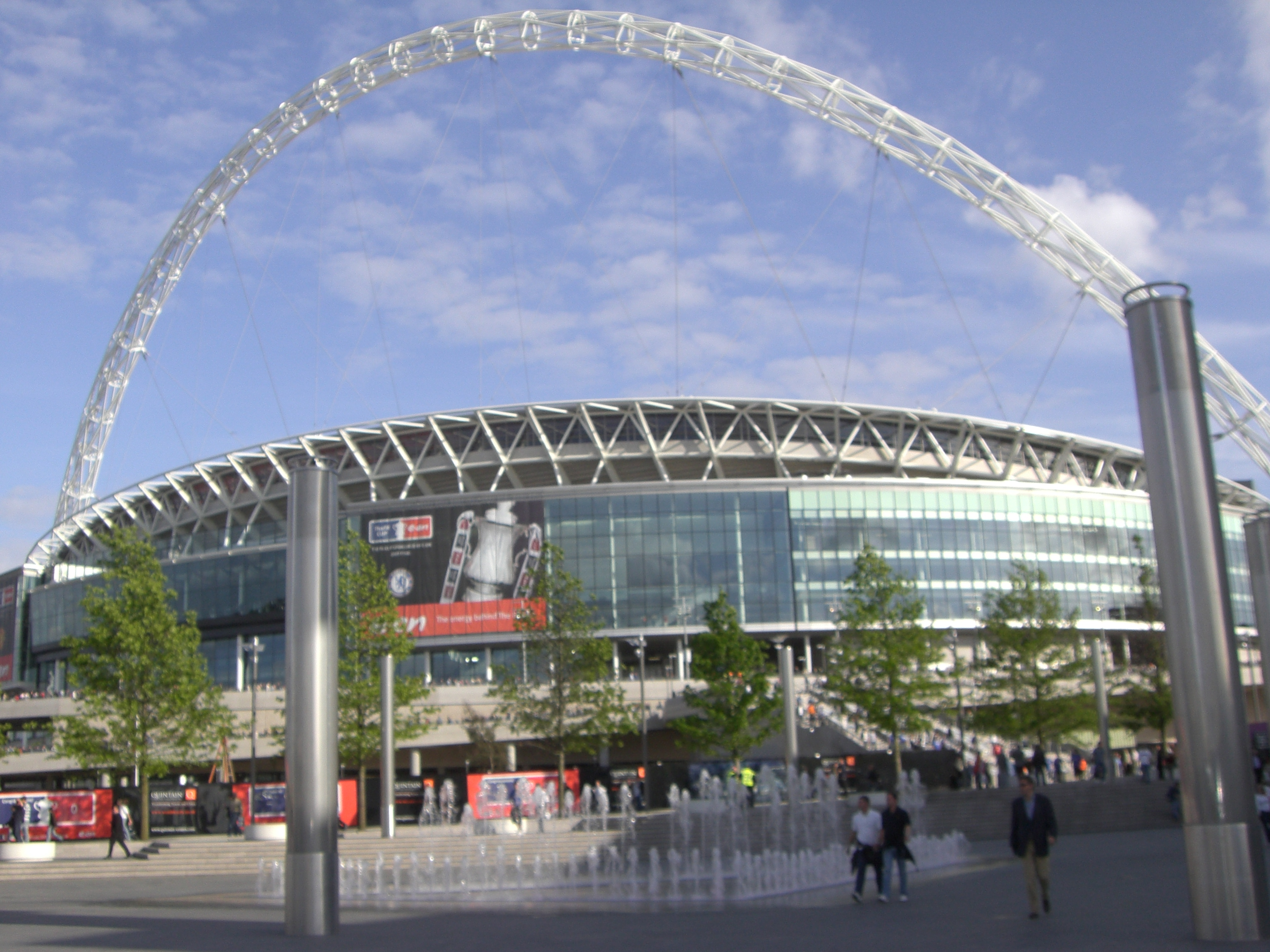
- The new Wembley Stadium on 19 May 2007, the day it held its first FA Cup final
- Status: Active
- Genre: Sporting event
- Dates: Varies, but usually the last Saturday of May
- Frequency: Annual
- Locations: London, England; Cardiff, Wales (2001–2006)
- Inaugurated: 1872
- Organiser: The Football Association

The FA Cup final (in England, traditionally known simply as the Cup Final) is the last match in the Football Association Challenge Cup. It has regularly been one of the most attended domestic football events in the world, with an official attendance of 89,472 at the 2017 final. The Final is the culmination of a knockout competition among clubs belonging to The Football Association in England, although Scottish and Irish teams competed in the early years and Welsh teams regularly compete, with Cardiff City winning the Cup in 1927 and reaching the final in 1925 and 2008. From 1923 until 2000 it was played mostly at the original Wembley Stadium, from 2000 to 2006 at the Millennium Stadium, Cardiff, and has been played at the current Wembley Stadium since 2007.

As of 2026, 145 FA Cup finals have been played.

Victory in the final is one of the ways teams can qualify for the UEFA Europa League of the following season.

== History ==
The first FA Cup final was held at Kennington Oval on 16 March 1872 and was contested between Wanderers and Royal Engineers, with Wanderers winning 1–0.

After the 1873 final was held at Lillie Bridge, the event was held at the Oval until 1892. The 1893 and 1894 finals were respectively held at Fallowfield Stadium in Manchester and Goodison Park in Liverpool, before the event returned to London in 1895, being held at Crystal Palace until the outbreak of World War I. After the war, the event was held at Stamford Bridge, before Wembley Stadium opened in 1923. The first final at Wembley, in which Bolton Wanderers beat West Ham United 2–0, had an official attendance of 126,047, although the actual figure is believed to be as much as 300,000. A police horse named Billy was used to regain control after the large crowd overflowed onto the field, earning it the nickname "White Horse Final". The 1927 final saw "Abide with Me" being sung for the first time at the Cup final, which has become a pre-match tradition.

Wembley continued to host the final until 2000, when it closed for redevelopment. The Millennium Stadium in Cardiff hosted the final between 2001 and 2006, before the new Wembley Stadium opened in 2007.

Up to and including 1998, if the final ended in a draw (after extra time), a replay would be required. This happened on 14 occasions, the last being in 1993 between Arsenal and Sheffield Wednesday. In September 1998, the Football Association decided that all future finals would be decided "on the day", meaning that a penalty shootout would decide the winner if the score was level after normal and extra time. Three finals since have been decided by a penalty shootout, those of 2005 (Arsenal defeating Manchester United), 2006 (Liverpool defeating West Ham United) and 2022 (Liverpool defeating Chelsea).

Stan Mortensen's hat-trick for Blackpool in 1953 is the only hat-trick ever scored at Wembley in the competition's final. The fastest goal in an FA Cup final was scored by Manchester City's İlkay Gündoğan, 12 seconds after kick-off in the 2023 FA Cup final. Bury's 6–0 victory over Derby County in the 1903 FA Cup final and Manchester City's 6–0 victory over Watford in the 2019 FA Cup final are the largest winning margins. With his goal in the 2012 Final, Chelsea's Didier Drogba became the first player to score in four finals.

The FA Cup final is one of ten events reserved for live broadcast on UK terrestrial television under the Ofcom Code on Sports and Other Listed and Designated Events.

== See also ==
- FA Cup semi-finals
