= George W. Wilson (IRS commissioner) =

American government official

Commissioner of Internal Revenue
- In office March 1, 1899 – November 27, 1900
- President: William McKinley
- Preceded by: Nathan B. Scott
- Succeeded by: John W. Yerkes

Personal details
- Born: September 13, 1843; Preble County, Ohio
- Died: November 27, 1900 (aged 57); Washington, D.C.

George W. Wilson (1843–1900) was a Commissioner of Internal Revenue at the Internal Revenue Service (IRS) in the United States.

== Life and career ==
Wilson was born on September 13, 1843, in Preble County, Ohio.

During the American Civil War, Wilson became a private in the Union Army as part of the Fifty-fourth Ohio Volunteer Infantry at the age of eighteen. He left the army at the end of the war as a first lieutenant.

In 1866, Wilson began to practice law. In 1869, Wilson began working for the Internal Revenue Service where he served in various positions. He eventually became head of the IRS.

Wilson served as IRS Commissioner from March 1, 1899, to November 27, 1900.

Wilson died on November 27, 1900, in Washington, D.C.
