= George Wilson (rugby union, born 1866) =

Scotland international rugby union player

- Born: George Robert Wilson; 12 October 1866 Duns, Scotland
- Died: 12 March 1908 (aged 41) Newmains, Scotland

Rugby union career
- Position: Centre
Amateur team(s)
Years	Team	Apps	(Points)
- Royal HSFP
Provincial / State sides
Years	Team	Apps	(Points)
1886-87	East of Scotland District		
1886	Edinburgh District		
International career
Years	Team	Apps	(Points)
1886-91	Scotland	5	(0)

George Wilson (12 October 1866 – 12 March 1908) was a Scotland international rugby union player.

== Rugby Union career ==
=== Amateur career ===
He played for Royal HSFP.

=== Provincial career ===
He played for East of Scotland District against West of Scotland District on 30 January 1886. He played for East again in the 1887 fixture against West.

He played for Edinburgh District in the inter-city match against Glasgow District on 4 December 1886.

=== International career ===
He was capped 5 times for Scotland in 1886 to 1891.

== Death ==
Wilson died of pneumonia in 1908. The British Medical Journal ran this obituary:

THE LATE DR. G. R. WILSON. A wide circle of friends will hear with deep regret of the death of Dr G. R. Wilson, Allanton House, Newmains. Dr Wilson had recently an attack of influenza, from which he was making a satisfactory recovery, when pneumonia supervened, and to this he succumbed yesterday morning. A native of Duns and a member of a well-known Berwickshire family, Dr Wilson was educated at the High School and Edinburgh University. After graduation he devoted himself exclusively to the study of mental diseases. A period of training in other medical schools was followed by his appointment to the post of assistant physician to the Royal Edinburgh Asylum, which post he held for four years, and relinquished on his promotion to that of superintendent at Mavisbank Asylum. He retired from this position in 1905, to devote himself to consulting work in psychiatric medicine and in this connection opened a sanatorium for the treatment of neurasthenia and other nervous diseases at Allanton House, Newmains. This institution had already gained a deservedly high reputation for the successful treatment of a wide group of nervous disorders. Dr Wilson was the author of a number of important works dealing with insanity, which had marked him out as a man of singular ability in this department of medicine, and had earned for him a wide reputation among psychiatric physicians in this country. At the onset of his last illness he had just completed a new and important work on "Evolution, Deviation, and Disease of the Mind" to be published in the autumn of this year. Personally Dr Wilson was one of the most attractive of men, and many who knew him to be an able and eminent physician will remember him best as an old international Rugby football player, as a golfer, cricketer, or curler — and above all, as one of the truest of friends and most genial of companions. Dr Wilson is survived by a widow and two children.
