= Billy Wilson (cricketer) =

Australian cricketer

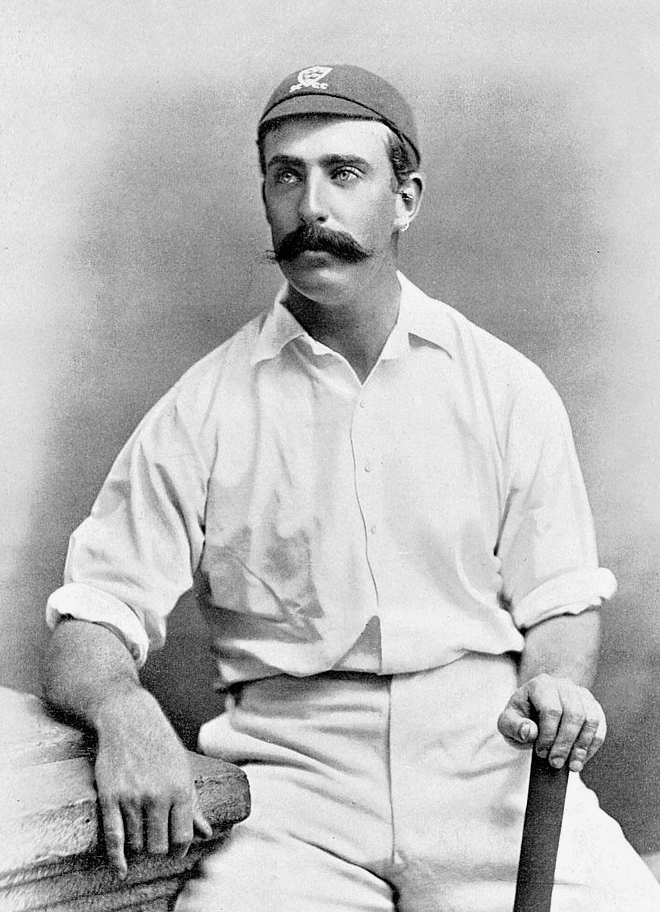
- Wilson in about 1895

Personal information
- Born: 27 April 1868; Fitzroy, Victoria, Australia
- Died: 9 March 1920 (aged 51); St Kilda, Victoria, Australia
- Batting: Right-handed
- Bowling: Right-arm fast medium

Career statistics
Competition	First-class
Matches	75
Runs scored	2,605
Batting average	20.19
100s/50s	3/10
Top score	174
Balls bowled	?
Wickets	34
Bowling average	60.05
5 wickets in innings	0
10 wickets in match	0
Best bowling	4/47
Catches/stumpings	41/–
- Source: CricInfo, 25 March 2019

George Lindsay "Billy" Wilson (27 April 1868 – 9 March 1920) was an Australian first-class cricketer active from 1886 to 1899 who played for Sussex and Victoria. He appeared in 75 first-class matches as a right-handed batsman who bowled right arm fast medium. He scored 2,605 runs with a highest score of 174 among three centuries and took 34 wickets with a best performance of four for 47.
