= William Pickering (footballer) =

Scottish footballer

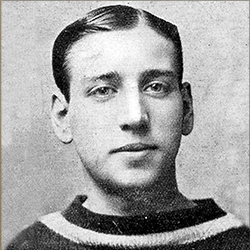

Personal information
- Full name: William Pickering
- Date of birth: 1894
- Place of birth: Glasgow, Scotland
- Date of death: 9 November 1917 (aged 23)
- Place of death: Iraq
- Position: Centre forward

Senior career*
Years	Team	Apps	(Gls)
- Townend
–1912	Ashfield		
1912–1915	Burnley	13	(6)
1915	Johnstone		
1915	Morton	5	(4)
- * Club domestic league appearances and goals

William Pickering (1894 – 9 November 1917) was a Scottish professional footballer who played in the Football League for Burnley as a centre forward. He also played in the Scottish League for Morton.

== Personal life ==
In 1915, during the second year of the First World War, Pickering enlisted as a private in the Seaforth Highlanders. Pickering's battalion saw action in the Mesopotamian campaign and he was shot through the head and killed during the Capture of Tikrit on 9 November 1917. He was buried in Baghdad (North Gate) War Cemetery.

== Honours ==
Burnley

- Lancashire Senior Cup: 1914–15

== Career statistics ==
Appearances and goals by club, season and competition
Club	Season	League			FA Cup		Total	
Club	Season	Division	Apps	Goals	Apps	Goals	Apps	Goals
Burnley	1913–14	First Division	3	1	0	0	3	1
Burnley	1914–15	First Division	10	5	1	0	11	5
Burnley	Total		13	6	1	0	14	6
Morton	1915–16	Scottish First Division	5	4	—		5	4
Career total			18	10	1	0	19	10
