= Sam Haden =

English footballer and manager

Personal information
- Full name: Samson Haden
- Date of birth: 17 January 1902
- Place of birth: Royston, England
- Date of death: 1974 (aged 71–72)
- Height: 5 ft 6 in (1.68 m)
- Position: Forward

Senior career*
Years	Team	Apps	(Gls)
- Castleford Town
1923–1926	Arsenal	88	(10)
1927–1935	Notts County	289	(36)
1938–1946	Peterborough United	21	(8)
Total		398	(54)

Managerial career
- 1938–1948: Peterborough United
- * Club domestic league appearances and goals

Samson Haden (17 January 1902 – 1974) was an English footballer who played in the Football League for Arsenal and Notts County. He also spent ten years as manager of Peterborough United.
