= George Wilson (footballer, born 1905) =

Scottish footballer

Personal information
- Full name: George McIntyre Wilson
- Date of birth: 23 May 1905
- Place of birth: Kilmarnock, Scotland
- Date of death: 22 May 1984 (aged 78)
- Place of death: Huddersfield, England
- Position: Midfielder

Youth career
- Portobello Thistle

Senior career*
Years	Team	Apps	(Gls)
1927	Clydebank	11	(3)
1927–1928	Alloa Athletic	6	(0)
1928–1929	Huddersfield Town	1	(1)
1929–1930	Leeds United	3	(0)
1930–1931	Chesterfield	3	(1)
- * Club domestic league appearances and goals

George McIntyre Wilson (23 May 1905 – 22 May 1984) was a Scottish professional footballer who played as a midfielder for Clydebank, Alloa Athletic, Huddersfield Town, Leeds United and Chesterfield.
