= Norman Smith (footballer, born December 1897) =

English footballer and manager

Personal information
- Full name: Norman Smith
- Date of birth: 15 December 1897
- Place of birth: Newburn, Newcastle upon Tyne, England
- Date of death: 18 May 1978 (aged 80)
- Place of death: Newcastle, England
- Height: 5 ft 8 in (1.73 m)
- Position: Defender

Senior career*
Years	Team	Apps	(Gls)
1924–1927	Huddersfield Town	24	(0)
1927–1930	Sheffield Wednesday	19	(0)
1930–1932	Queens Park Rangers	26	(0)
1932–1934	FC Kreuzlingen	?	(?)
1934–1938	FC St. Gallen	?	(?)

Managerial career
- 1961–1962: Newcastle United
- * Club domestic league appearances and goals

Norman Smith (15 December 1897 – 18 May 1978) was a footballer and later manager. He was born in Newburn, Newcastle upon Tyne, England.

During his playing career he played for sides including Huddersfield Town, Sheffield Wednesday and Queens Park Rangers.

Stan Seymour appointed Smith as his assistant at Newcastle United in 1939 and he helped contribute to the club's success in the 1950s. The loyalty he had shown by staying at the club for twenty-two years was rewarded in 1961 when he was appointed the new manager of the club, following Charlie Mitten's sacking. While he only won twelve games out of thirty-five during his period in charge, this was enough to stave off relegation to the Third Division, which had looked a distinct possibility when Mitten was sacked, and he still had the respect of the fans for staying with the club for so long and showing a passion for the club. He stepped down as manager at the end of the season and was succeeded by Joe Harvey, though Smith remained at the club in various other capacities for several more years.

Smith died suddenly in 1978, while on his way home from Newcastle's stadium St James' Park after watching the team play.
