= Willie Campbell (footballer) =

Scottish footballer (1900–??)

Personal information
- Date of birth: 1900
- Place of birth: Dunfermline, Scotland
- Position: Defender

Senior career*
Years	Team	Apps	(Gls)
- Cowdenbeath
- Alloa Athletic
1927–1929	Huddersfield Town	3	(0)
- Manchester City
- * Club domestic league appearances and goals

William R. Campbell (born 1900, date of death unknown) was a Scottish professional footballer. He was born in Townhill, near Dunfermline.

At 18 he played for the Scottish teams Cowdenbeath, followed by Clackmannan. After that however he moved to Canada where he, for two seasons, played for the Montreal Maroons Soccer Team. In 1928, he returned to Scotland, representing Alloa Athletic, and was from there scouted for Huddersfield Town. He later played for Manchester City.
