= Bill Pickering (footballer, born 1901) =

English footballer

Personal information
- Full name: William Harold Pickering
- Date of birth: 1 November 1901
- Place of birth: Birmingham, England
- Date of death: c. February 1971 (aged 69)
- Place of death: Warley, England
- Height: 5 ft 11 in (1.80 m)
- Position: Full back

Senior career*
Years	Team	Apps	(Gls)
–1924	Latch & Batchelors		
1924–1925	Sunderland	0	(0)
1925–1926	Merthyr Town	9	(0)
1926–1927	Gillingham	45	(0)
1927–1929	Huddersfield Town	1	(0)
1929–1930	Reading	21	(0)
1930–1931	Colwyn Bay United		
1931–1937	Bristol Rovers	215	(1)
1937–1938	Accrington Stanley	29	(0)
1938	Oswestry Town		
- Cradley Heath
- * Club domestic league appearances and goals

William Harold Pickering (1 November 1901 – c. February 1971) was a British professional footballer. He initially played for Latch & Batchelors, before playing as an amateur for Sunderland. He went on to play for Merthyr Town, Gillingham, Huddersfield Town, Reading, Colwyn Bay United, Bristol Rovers, Accrington Stanley, Oswestry Town and Cradley Heath. He was born in Birmingham.
