= Levi Redfern =

English footballer

Personal information
- Date of birth: 18 February 1905
- Place of birth: Burton upon Trent, England
- Date of death: 1976 (aged 70–71)
- Place of death: Poole, England
- Position: Defender

Senior career*
Years	Team	Apps	(Gls)
- York City
1927–1931	Huddersfield Town	52	(1)
1932–1933	Bradford City	6	(0)
- * Club domestic league appearances and goals

Levi Redfern (18 February 1905 – 1976) was an English footballer, who played for York City, Huddersfield Town and Bradford City. He was born in Burton upon Trent.

== Honours ==
Huddersfield Town

- FA Cup runner-up: 1927–28
