= Jimmy Smailes =

English footballer

Personal information
- Full name: James Smailes
- Date of birth: 9 June 1907
- Place of birth: Tow Law, County Durham, England
- Date of death: 1986
- Height: 5 ft 5 in (1.65 m)
- Position: Outside left

Senior career*
Years	Team	Apps	(Gls)
- Tow Law Town
1927–1930	Huddersfield Town	32	(8)
1930–1931	Tottenham Hotspur	16	(3)
1932–1934	Blackpool	92	(25)
1935	Grimsby Town	10	(0)
1936–1937	Stockport County	63	(17)
1938–1939	Bradford City	36	(13)
- Waterhouses Sports Club
- * Club domestic league appearances and goals

James Smailes (9 June 1907 – 1986) was an English professional footballer who played for Tow Law Town, Huddersfield Town, Tottenham Hotspur, Blackpool, Grimsby Town, Stockport County, Bradford City and Waterhouses Sports Club.

== Football career ==
Smailes began his career at his local non-League club Tow Law Town before joining Huddersfield Town in 1927.

He featured in 32 matches and found the net on eight occasions for the Yorkshire club.

The outside left signed for Tottenham Hotspur in 1930. He scored on his 'Lilywhites' debut in a 3–1 victory over Bradford City at White Hart Lane in March 1931 in the old Second Division. Smailes made 16 appearances and scored three goals for 'Spurs'.

After leaving London Smailes played at Blackpool where he scored 25 goals in 92 matches.

He went on to play for Grimsby Town, Stockport County, Bradford City before finally ending his playing career at Waterhouses Sports Club.

During World War II, Smailes was a guest player at Bradford Park Avenue, Hartlepool United and Huddersfield Town.

He died in 1986.
