= Jimmy Naylor =

English footballer

Personal information
- Full name: James Naylor
- Date of birth: 2 March 1901
- Place of birth: High Crompton, England
- Date of death: 31 August 1983 (aged 82)
- Place of death: Shaw, Oldham, England
- Height: 5 ft 10 in (1.78 m)
- Position: Defender

Senior career*
Years	Team	Apps	(Gls)
- Oldham Athletic
1928–1930	Huddersfield Town	38	(2)
1930–1932	Newcastle United	32	(0)
1932–1933	Manchester City	1	(0)
1933–1935	Macclesfield	42	(5)
1935–1936	Nelson		
1937–1938	Wigan Athletic		
- * Club domestic league appearances and goals

James Naylor (2 March 1901 – 31 August 1983) was an English professional footballer who played for Oldham Athletic, Huddersfield Town, Newcastle United, Manchester City and Macclesfield. He made only one appearance for Manchester City, against Middlesbrough on 7 January 1933, when he deputised for Jackie Bray. He was born in High Crompton, Lancashire.

After leaving Macclesfield, he played for Nelson and Wigan Athletic.

== Honours ==
Huddersfield Town

- FA Cup runner-up: 1929–30
