= Tommy Meads =

English footballer

Personal information
- Full name: Thomas Meads
- Date of birth: 2 November 1900
- Place of birth: Grassmoor, Chesterfield, England
- Date of death: 1983 (aged 82–83)
- Position: Midfielder

Senior career*
Years	Team	Apps	(Gls)
1923–1926	Stockport County	117	(21)
1926–1928	Huddersfield Town	40	(2)
1928–1929	Reading	31	(4)
1929–1935	Tottenham Hotspur	183	(6)
1935–1936	Notts County	18	(2)
- * Club domestic league appearances and goals

Thomas Meads (2 November 1900 – 1983) was a professional footballer, who played for Stockport County, Huddersfield Town, Reading, Tottenham Hotspur and Notts County.

== Football career ==
Meads played for non league sides Grassmoor Ivanhoe, Claycross Town and later Matlock Town before joining Stockport County in 1923 where the left half completed 117 matches and netting on 21 occasions. He moved to Huddersfield Town in 1926 and went on to feature in 40 matches and scoring twice for the club. In 1928 he joined Reading and played 31 games and finding the net four times. Meads went on to play for Tottenham Hotspur between 1929 and 1934 where he featured in 189 matches in all competitions and scoring on six occasions for the Lilywhites. He left White Hart Lane in 1935 to end his career at Notts County where he played a further 18 matches and scoring twice.
