= Billy Carr =

English footballer

Personal information
- Full name: William Edward Carr
- Date of birth: 7 March 1905
- Place of birth: Framwellgate Moor, England
- Date of death: 1989 (aged 83–84)
- Height: 5 ft 7 1/2 in (1.71 m)
- Position: Wing-half

Senior career*
Years	Team	Apps	(Gls)
1926–1935	Huddersfield Town	93	(1)
1934–1939	Southend United	95	(1)
- * Club domestic league appearances and goals

William Edward Carr (7 March 1905 – 1989) was a professional footballer who played in the Football League for Huddersfield Town and Southend United. Born in Framwellgate Moor, County Durham, Carr played in either wing-half position.
