= Johnny Dent =

English footballer

Personal information
- Full name: John George Dent
- Date of birth: 31 January 1903
- Place of birth: Spennymoor, County Durham, England
- Height: 5 ft 10 in (1.78 m)
- Position: Centre forward

Senior career*
Years	Team	Apps	(Gls)
- Durham City
1927–1929	Huddersfield Town	48	(22)
1929–1936	Nottingham Forest	206	(122)
- * Club domestic league appearances and goals

John George Dent (born 31 January 1903) was an English professional footballer who played for Durham City, Huddersfield Town and Nottingham Forest.

== Nottingham Forest ==
Dent made his league debut for Nottingham Forest on 3 October 1929 at the City Ground in a 1–1 draw with Bradford Park Avenue.

He is one of only 6 players to score over 100 goals for Nottingham Forest, netting his first on 5 October 1929 away to Tottenham Hotspur. In March 1935 he scored two successive hat-tricks against Oldham Athletic and Burnley. Both matches were 5-0 victories for Forest. He scored five hat-tricks for Forest in total.

Dent's final appearance for Forest was against Leicester City at the City Ground on 19 December 1936.
