= Amos Brook Hirst =

English football administrator, President of the Football Association (1878 - 1955)

Sir Amos Brook Hirst, OBE (6 December 1878 – 26 November 1955) was an English football administrator and legal professional most associated with Huddersfield Town F.C., who served as chairman of The Football Association (FA) from 1941 to 1955.

== Biography ==
Hirst was born in Huddersfield, West Riding of Yorkshire, in 1878, where he attended Longwood Grammar School and Huddersfield College. Hirst was a keen rugby player in his youth before suffering a shoulder injury, and turned to football as a result. Hirst practiced as a solicitor for several years and was subsequently appointed the county court registrar for the Huddersfield, Halifax and Dewsbury districts in 1927; Hirst also briefly served as Huddersfield's deputy coroner. Hirst retired as the district's registrar in 1949. Hirst married Violet Hilda Woolven in 1906, they had a son, Geoffrey, and a daughter, Betty. Hirst lived at 'Brookleigh' on New Hey Road in Huddersfield. Hirst was buried at Salendine Nook's Baptist Chapel.

=== Football ===
Hirst helped found Huddersfield Town F.C. and was the club's inaugural vice-president; Hirst was also elected onto the club's board upon its founding as a limited company. Hirst was one of a number of local Huddersfield dignitaries who prevented the club being moved to Leeds after the First World War. Hirst was subsequently chairman of Huddersfield during its period of greatest success, when the club won the Football League's Championship for three years in succession, in the 1923–24, 1924–25 and 1925–26 seasons. Hirst was the chairman of Huddersfield from 1925 to 1941.

Hirst began his participation in national football administration when he served on the Football League's management committee from 1931 to 1939, and subsequently the league's vice-president from 1939 before his election as the chairman of The Football Association in 1941.

Suffering from ill health, Hirst resigned the chairmanship of the FA in May 1955 and was succeeded by Arthur Drewry. The England national football team wore black armbands to commemorate Hirst at their international friendly against Spain at Wembley Stadium on 30 November 1955, which England won 4-1.

=== Honours ===
Hirst was appointed an Officer of the Order of the British Empire (OBE) in the 1948 Birthday Honours, and knighted in the New Year's Honours of 1954; his knighthood was bestowed by Queen Elizabeth The Queen Mother at Buckingham Palace. Hirst was appointed a chevalier of the French Legion of Honour in 1953, the honour awarded at the FA's 90th Anniversary dinner at the Dorchester Hotel in London. The FA's celebration was held as it coincided with the coronation of Queen Elizabeth II.
