= Hugh Turner (footballer, born 1904) =

English footballer

Personal information
- Date of birth: 6 August 1904
- Place of birth: Wigan, England
- Date of death: late 1996
- Height: 5 ft 10 in (1.78 m)
- Position: Goalkeeper

Senior career*
Years	Team	Apps	(Gls)
1926–1937	Huddersfield Town	364	(0)
	Fulham		(?)

International career
1931	England	2	(0)
- * Club domestic league appearances and goals

Hugh Turner (6 August 1904 – 1996) was a professional footballer who played as a goalkeeper mainly for Huddersfield Town.

He was born in Wigan, but moved to Gateshead as a youngster. He played for Felling Colliery and Gateshead High Fell, before moving to Huddersfield in 1926.

He made two appearances for Mossley in the pre-war 1939–40 season.

He also played two games for England, against France and Belgium in 1931.

== Honours ==
Huddersfield Town

- FA Cup runner-up: 1929–30
