= Bob Kelly (footballer) =

English footballer

Personal information
- Full name: Robert Kelly
- Date of birth: 16 November 1893
- Place of birth: Ashton-in-Makerfield, Lancashire, England
- Date of death: 22 September 1969 (aged 75)
- Place of death: Fylde, England
- Height: 5 ft 7 in (1.70 m)
- Position: Inside forward

Youth career
- Ashton White Star
- Ashton Central
- Earlestown Rovers
- St Helens Town

Senior career*
| Years | Team | Apps | (Gls) |
| 1913–1925 | Burnley | 277 | (88) |
| 1925–1927 | Sunderland | 50 | (11) |
| 1927–1932 | Huddersfield Town | 186 | (59) |
| 1932–1934 | Preston North End | 78 | (29) |
| 1934–1936 | Carlisle United | 12 | (1) |
| Total | | 603 | (189) |

International career
| 1920–1928 | England | 14 | (8) |

Managerial career
- 1935–1936: Carlisle United
- 1936–1938: Stockport County
- 1946–1947: Sporting CP
- 1949–1951: St. Gallen
- 1951–1955: SC Heerenveen
- 1955–19xx: KFC
- 1960–1961: Barry Town
- * Club domestic league appearances and goals

Robert Kelly (16 November 1893 – 22 September 1969) was an English professional footballer. He broke the British football transfer record when he moved from Burnley to Sunderland for £6,550 in 1925. He spent two years at the Roker Park club before joining Huddersfield Town. He later played for Preston North End.

He made 14 appearances for England between 1920 and 1928, scoring eight goals.

He also had spells as manager at Carlisle United, Stockport County, SC Heerenveen and KFC.

== Honours ==
Huddersfield Town

- FA Cup runner-up: 1927–28, 1929–30
