= Harry Raw =

English footballer

Personal information
- Full name: Henry Raw
- Date of birth: 6 July 1903
- Place of birth: Tow Law, County Durham, England
- Position: Striker

Senior career*
Years	Team	Apps	(Gls)
- Tow Law Town
1925–1931	Huddersfield Town	63	(11)
- West Bromwich Albion
- * Club domestic league appearances and goals

Henry Raw (born 6 July 1903) was a professional footballer, who played for Tow Law Town, Huddersfield Town and West Bromwich Albion.

== Honours ==
Huddersfield Town

- FA Cup runner-up: 1929–30
