= Bon Spence =

English footballer

Personal information
- Full name: Marshall Bonwell Spence
- Date of birth: 21 February 1899
- Place of birth: Ferryhill, England
- Height: 5 ft 10 1/2 in (1.79 m)
- Position: Defender

Senior career*
Years	Team	Apps	(Gls)
1924–1933	Huddersfield Town	69	(0)
- * Club domestic league appearances and goals

Marshall Bonwell Spence (born 21 February 1899) was an English professional footballer, who played for Huddersfield Town.

== Honours ==
Huddersfield Town

- FA Cup runner-up: 1929–30
