= 1911–12 Huddersfield Town A.F.C. season =

Huddersfield Town
1911–12 season
- Chairman: Hilton Crowther
- Manager: Dick Pudan (until 20 April 1912); Arthur Fairclough (from 24 April 1912)
- Stadium: Leeds Road
- Football League Second Division: 17th
- FA Cup: First round (eliminated by Manchester United)
- Top goalscorer: League: James Macauley (11); All: James Macauley (12)
- Highest home attendance: 13,000 vs Chelsea (23 March 1912)
- Lowest home attendance: 2,000 vs Bristol City (6 April 1912)
- Biggest win: 4–0 vs Blackpool (27 April 1912)
- Biggest defeat: 0–5 vs Gainsborough Trinity (2 March 1912)

Huddersfield Town's 1911–12 campaign was a season which saw Huddersfield Town's Football League adventure nearly cut short after only 2 seasons for financial reasons. Town finished in 17th place, but Gainsborough Trinity failed re-election and Town survived.

The last match of the season was a 4–0 victory over Blackpool, leading The Huddersfield Weekly Examiner to ask, "Why is it the capabilities of the team have so seldom been revealed during the last eight months?" After the club went into voluntary liquidation at the season's end, the Football Association and the Football League accepted a reconstruction scheme with a new organisation taking the place of the old one.

== Squad at the start of the season ==
Note: Flags indicate national team as defined under FIFA eligibility rules; some limited exceptions apply. Players may hold more than one non-FIFA nationality.

| Pos. | Nation | Player |
|---|---|---|
| GK | ENG | Ronald Brebner |
| GK | SCO | Sandy Mutch |
| DF | ENG | William Bartlett |
| DF | SCO | Simon Beaton |
| DF | ENG | Fred Blackman |
| DF | ENG | Fred Bullock |
| DF | SCO | Charles Dinnie |
| DF | ENG | Fred Fayers |
| DF | ENG | Ellis Hall |
| DF | ENG | George Metcalf |
| DF | SCO | George Raitt |

| Pos. | Nation | Player |
|---|---|---|
| DF | ENG | Robert Thomson |
| MF | ENG | George Blackburn |
| MF | ENG | Arthur Cowley |
| MF | SCO | James Howie |
| MF | ENG | Joe Jee |
| MF | EIR | James Macauley |
| FW | SCO | Jack Cameron |
| FW | ENG | James Proctor |
| FW | SCO | James Richardson |
| FW | ENG | Harry Taylor |

== Review ==
Following their first full season in the Football League, Town under Dick Pudan were hoping to rise up the table to try to establish themselves as possible promotion candidates. However, promotion was never a realistic possibility with inconsistency proving to be Town's downfall in the season. This coupled with Town's off-field finances proved too much for the team to take and Town finished 17th place.

== Squad at the end of the season ==
Note: Flags indicate national team as defined under FIFA eligibility rules; some limited exceptions apply. Players may hold more than one non-FIFA nationality.

| Pos. | Nation | Player |
|---|---|---|
| GK | ENG | Ronald Brebner |
| GK | SCO | Sandy Mutch |
| DF | ENG | William Bartlett |
| DF | SCO | Simon Beaton |
| DF | ENG | Fred Blackman |
| DF | ENG | Fred Bullock |
| DF | SCO | Charles Dinnie |
| DF | ENG | Fred Fayers |
| DF | ENG | Ellis Hall |
| DF | ENG | William Martin |
| DF | ENG | George Metcalf |

| Pos. | Nation | Player |
|---|---|---|
| DF | SCO | George Raitt |
| DF | ENG | Robert Thomson |
| MF | SCO | Andrew Armour |
| MF | ENG | George Blackburn |
| MF | ENG | Arthur Cowley |
| MF | SCO | James Howie |
| MF | ENG | Joe Jee |
| MF | EIR | James Macauley |
| FW | ENG | James Proctor |
| FW | SCO | James Richardson |
| FW | ENG | Harry Taylor |

== Results ==
A complete list of results for Huddersfield Town in the 1911/12 season is below:

=== Division Two ===
| Date | Opponents | Home/ Away | Result F–A | Scorers | Attendance | Position |
|---|---|---|---|---|---|---|
| 2 September 1911 | Barnsley | H | 2–1 | Taylor, Cowley | 12,755 | 5th |
| 9 September 1911 | Bradford Park Avenue | A | 1–3 | Taylor | 16,000 | 15th |
| 16 September 1911 | Fulham | H | 2–0 | Howie, Jee | 7,000 | 11th |
| 23 September 1911 | Derby County | A | 2–4 | Cameron, Blackburn | 10,000 | 14th |
| 30 September 1911 | Stockport County | H | 2–0 | Macauley (2) | 3,000 | 11th |
| 7 October 1911 | Leeds City | A | 0–2 | | 12,000 | 12th |
| 14 October 1911 | Wolverhampton Wanderers | H | 1–1 | Taylor | 4,000 | 13th |
| 21 October 1911 | Leicester Fosse | A | 2–0 | Hall, Cowley | 5,000 | 11th |
| 28 October 1911 | Gainsborough Trinity | H | 2–2 | Richardson, Macauley | 4,000 | 11th |
| 4 November 1911 | Grimsby Town | A | 2–1 | Jee (2) | ? | 8th |
| 11 November 1911 | Nottingham Forest | H | 1–2 | Richardson | 6,500 | 11th |
| 18 November 1911 | Chelsea | A | 1–3 | Blackburn | 5,000 | 12th |
| 25 November 1911 | Clapton Orient | H | 0–0 | | 4,500 | 12th |
| 2 December 1911 | Bristol City | A | 2–3 | Blackburn, Howie | 5,000 | 12th |
| 9 December 1911 | Birmingham | H | 3–2 | Richardson (3) | 3,500 | 12th |
| 16 December 1911 | Burnley | H | 1–1 | Armour | 8,000 | 12th |
| 23 December 1911 | Blackpool | A | 1–3 | Armour | 4,000 | 12th |
| 25 December 1911 | Glossop | H | 3–1 | Taylor, Richardson, Fayers | 10,000 | 11th |
| 1 January 1912 | Barnsley | A | 0–0 | | 12,000 | 13th |
| 6 January 1912 | Bradford Park Avenue | H | 3–1 | Howie, Fayers, Macauley | 3,000 | 11th |
| 20 January 1912 | Fulham | A | 1–3 | Macauley | 10,000 | 11th |
| 27 January 1912 | Derby County | H | 0–0 | | 8,000 | 13th |
| 3 February 1912 | Stockport County | A | 1–3 | Taylor | 2,000 | 13th |
| 10 February 1912 | Leeds City | H | 1–2 | Richardson | 8,000 | 13th |
| 17 February 1912 | Wolverhampton Wanderers | A | 2–1 | Jee, Howie | 8,000 | 11th |
| 24 February 1912 | Leicester Fosse | H | 1–2 | Macauley | 5,000 | 12th |
| 2 March 1912 | Gainsborough Trinity | A | 0–5 | | 5,000 | 13th |
| 9 March 1912 | Grimsby Town | H | 2–0 | Macauley, Fayers | 5,500 | 12th |
| 16 March 1912 | Nottingham Forest | A | 0–3 | | 7,000 | 13th |
| 23 March 1912 | Chelsea | H | 1–3 | Howie | 13,000 | 16th |
| 30 March 1912 | Clapton Orient | A | 1–2 | Richardson | 6,000 | 16th |
| 5 April 1912 | Glossop | A | 3–2 | Richardson, Howie, Macauley | 3,000 | 15th |
| 6 April 1912 | Bristol City | H | 1–2 | Howie | 2,000 | 17th |
| 8 April 1912 | Hull City | A | 1–0 | Richardson | 7,000 | 16th |
| 9 April 1912 | Hull City | H | 0–2 | | 5,000 | 16th |
| 13 April 1912 | Birmingham | A | 0–1 | | 15,000 | 16th |
| 20 April 1912 | Burnley | A | 0–3 | | 15,000 | 17th |
| 27 April 1912 | Blackpool | H | 4–0 | Macauley (3), Fayers (pen) | 3,000 | 17th |

=== FA Cup ===
| Date | Round | Opponents | Home/ Away | Result F–A | Scorers | Attendance |
|---|---|---|---|---|---|---|
| 13 January 1912 | Round 1 | Manchester United | A | 1–3 | Macauley | 19,759 |

== Appearances and goals ==
| Name | Nationality | Position | League | | FA Cup | | Total | |
| Name | Nationality | Position | Apps | Goals | Apps | Goals | Apps | Goals |
|---|---|---|---|---|---|---|---|---|
| Andrew Armour | England | MF | 19 | 2 | 1 | 0 | 20 | 2 |
| William Bartlett | England | DF | 30 | 0 | 0 | 0 | 30 | 0 |
| Simon Beaton | England | DF | 24 | 0 | 1 | 0 | 25 | 0 |
| George Blackburn | England | DF | 18 | 3 | 0 | 0 | 18 | 3 |
| Fred Blackman | England | DF | 32 | 0 | 1 | 0 | 33 | 0 |
| Ronald Brebner | England | GK | 23 | 0 | 0 | 0 | 23 | 0 |
| Fred Bullock | England | DF | 28 | 0 | 1 | 0 | 29 | 0 |
| Jack Cameron | Scotland | FW | 2 | 1 | 0 | 0 | 2 | 1 |
| Arthur Cowley | England | MF | 5 | 2 | 0 | 0 | 5 | 2 |
| Charles Dinnie | Scotland | DF | 16 | 0 | 0 | 0 | 16 | 0 |
| Fred Fayers | England | DF | 27 | 4 | 1 | 0 | 28 | 4 |
| Ellis Hall | England | DF | 15 | 1 | 0 | 0 | 15 | 1 |
| James Howie | England | FW | 32 | 7 | 1 | 0 | 33 | 7 |
| Joe Jee | England | MF | 38 | 4 | 1 | 0 | 39 | 4 |
| James Macauley | Ireland | FW | 35 | 11 | 1 | 1 | 36 | 12 |
| William Martin | England | DF | 5 | 0 | 0 | 0 | 5 | 0 |
| George Metcalf | England | DF | 4 | 0 | 0 | 0 | 4 | 0 |
| Sandy Mutch | Scotland | GK | 13 | 0 | 1 | 0 | 14 | 0 |
| James Proctor | England | FW | 4 | 0 | 0 | 0 | 4 | 0 |
| George Raitt | Scotland | DF | 6 | 0 | 1 | 0 | 7 | 0 |
| James Richardson | Scotland | FW | 20 | 10 | 0 | 0 | 20 | 10 |
| Harry Taylor | England | FW | 15 | 5 | 1 | 0 | 16 | 5 |
| Robert Thomson | Scotland | DF | 5 | 0 | 0 | 0 | 5 | 0 |
| Ike Whelpton | England | GK | 2 | 0 | 0 | 0 | 2 | 0 |
