= 1910–11 Huddersfield Town A.F.C. season =

1910–11 season of Huddersfield Town

Huddersfield Town
1910–11 season
- Chairman: Hilton Crowther
- Manager: Dick Pudan
- Stadium: Leeds Road
- Football League Second Division: 13th
- FA Cup: Fourth qualifying round (eliminated by Lincoln City)
- Top goalscorer: League: James Richardson (14); All: James Richardson (15)
- Highest home attendance: 15,439 v Chelsea (23 March 1911)
- Lowest home attendance: 3,500 v Lincoln City (6 April 1911)
- Biggest win: 6–0 vs Horsforth (1 October 1910); 7–1 vs Birmingham (22 April 1911)
- Biggest defeat: 2–5 vs Glossop (26 November 1910); 2–5 vs Leeds City (28 January 1911); 0–3 vs Derby County (11 February 1911)

Huddersfield Town's 1910–11 campaign was Huddersfield Town's first ever season in the Football League. After coming through the election process to enter Division 2, Town finished their first season in professional football in 13th place.

== Squad at the start of the season ==
Note: Flags indicate national team as defined under FIFA eligibility rules; some limited exceptions apply. Players may hold more than one non-FIFA nationality.

Pos.	Nation	Player
GK	ENG	Thomas Felstead
GK	SCO	Sandy Mutch
DF	ENG	William Bartlett
DF	SCO	Simon Beaton
DF	ENG	Fred Blackman
DF	ENG	Robert Duxbury
DF	ENG	Fred Fayers
DF	ENG	Ellis Hall
DF	ENG	George Metcalf
DF	WAL	Charlie Morris
DF	SCO	Archie Taylor

Pos.	Nation	Player
DF	ENG	Sam Whittingham
MF	ENG	George Blackburn
MF	ENG	Gordon Burniston
MF	ENG	William Grundy
MF	ENG	Harold Hall
MF	ENG	Henry Hamilton
MF	ENG	Joe Jee
MF	ENG	Ernie Millward
FW	SCO	Sandy McCubbin
FW	ENG	John Wood

== Review ==
On 13 June 1910, Town were elected into the Football League only two years after being formed. Their first match against Bradford (Park Avenue) resulted in a 1–0 win thanks to Henry Hamilton's goal. The season saw Town finishing in 13th place with 34 points in Division 2.

== Squad at the end of the season ==
Note: Flags indicate national team as defined under FIFA eligibility rules; some limited exceptions apply. Players may hold more than one non-FIFA nationality.

Pos.	Nation	Player
GK	SCO	Sandy Mutch
GK	WAL	Leigh Richmond Roose
DF	ENG	William Bartlett
DF	SCO	Simon Beaton
DF	ENG	Fred Blackman
DF	ENG	Fred Bullock
DF	ENG	Robert Duxbury
DF	ENG	Fred Fayers
DF	ENG	Ellis Hall
DF	ENG	George Metcalf
DF	SCO	Archie Taylor
DF	ENG	Sam Whittingham

Pos.	Nation	Player
DF	EIR	James Wright
MF	ENG	George Blackburn
MF	ENG	Gordon Burniston
MF	ENG	Harold Hall
MF	ENG	Henry Hamilton
MF	SCO	James Howie
MF	ENG	Joe Jee
MF	EIR	James Macauley
MF	ENG	Ernie Millward
FW	SCO	Sandy McCubbin
FW	SCO	James Richardson
FW	ENG	John Wood

== Results ==
=== Division Two ===
Date	Opponents	Home/ Away	Result F - A	Scorers	Attendance	Position
3 September 1910	Bradford (Park Avenue)	A	1 - 0	Hamilton	16,000	1st
10 September 1910	Burnley	H	0 - 1		7,371	12th
17 September 1910	Gainsborough Trinity	A	1 - 3	McCubbin	6,000	18th
24 September 1910	Leeds City	H	3 - 2	McCubbin, Hamilton, Bartlett	7,500	13th
3 October 1910	Stockport County	A	0 - 1		2,500	17th
8 October 1910	Derby County	A	1 - 1	Burniston	12,000	15th
22 October 1910	Leicester Fosse	H	1 - 2	Hamilton	6,800	18th
29 October 1910	Wolverhampton Wanderers	A	3 - 0	Hamilton, McCubbin, Bartlett (pen)	12,000	17th
12 November 1910	Clapton Orient	A	0 - 2		12,000	18th
17 November 1910	Barnsley	A	2 - 1	Richardson, McCubbin	2,000	16th
26 November 1910	Glossop	A	2 - 5	Jee, Cuffe (og)	3,000	18th
3 December 1910	Bolton Wanderers	A	1 - 3	Jee	8,000	18th
10 December 1910	Bolton Wanderers	H	1 - 1	Richardson	5,000	16th
17 December 1910	Birmingham	A	1 - 2	Howie	5,000	18th
24 December 1910	West Bromwich Albion	H	0 - 2		4,296	18th
26 December 1910	Fulham	A	1 - 2	Hamilton	20,000	18th
27 December 1910	Lincoln City	A	2 - 2	Hamilton (2)	7,000	18th
31 December 1910	Bradford (Park Avenue)	H	0 - 0		7,000	18th
2 January 1911	Hull City	H	2 - 0	Howie, Hamilton	4,000	15th
7 January 1911	Burnley	A	1 - 2	Hamilton (pen)	7,000	17th
14 January 1911	Stockport County	H	4 - 1	Richardson (2), Macauley, Jee	8,000	14th
21 January 1911	Gainsborough Trinity	H	2 - 1	Richardson, Jee	5,000	14th
28 January 1911	Leeds City	A	2 - 5	Richardson, McCubbin	10,000	15th
4 February 1911	Blackpool	H	2 - 2	E. Hall, Jee	6,000	15th
11 February 1911	Derby County	H	0 - 3		8,000	15th
18 February 1911	Barnsley	H	2 - 0	Jee, Macauley	8,000	15th
25 February 1911	Leicester Fosse	A	1 - 2	Richardson	4,000	16th
28 February 1911	Fulham	H	1 - 2	Hamilton	4,000	16th
4 March 1911	Wolverhampton Wanderers	H	3 - 1	Jee, Richardson, Blackburn	5,000	16th
18 March 1911	Clapton Orient	H	2 - 0	Macauley, Richardson	4,000	16th
20 March 1911	Chelsea	A	0 - 2		12,000	16th
25 March 1911	Blackpool	A	1 - 1	Jee	6,000	15th
1 April 1911	Glossop	H	1 - 0	Richardson	6,000	15th
8 April 1911	Lincoln City	H	1 - 1	Richardson	3,500	15th
17 April 1911	Hull City	A	2 - 2	Richardson, Jee	10,000	15th
18 April 1911	Chelsea	H	3 - 1	Richardson (2), Jee	15,459	13th
22 April 1911	Birmingham	H	7 - 1	Macauley (3), Blackburn (2, 1 pen), Howie, Jee	6,000	13th
29 April 1911	West Bromwich Albion	A	0 - 1		30,135	13th

=== FA Cup ===
Date	Round	Opponents	Home/ Away	Result F - A	Scorers	Attendance
1 October 1910	1st Qualifying Round	Horsforth	H	6 - 0	Burniston, H. Hall, Fayers, Hamilton, Beaton, McCubbin	2,000
15 October 1910	2nd Qualifying Round	Mirfield United	H	2 - 0	Fayers, Jee	3,500
5 November 1910	3rd Qualifying Round	South Kirkby Colliery	A	5 - 1	McCubbin, Hamilton (2), Blackburn, unknown (og)	2,500
19 November 1910	4th Qualifying Round	Lincoln City	H	1 - 1	Richardson	3,000
23 November 1910	4th Qualifying Round Replay	Lincoln City	A	0 - 1		3,000

== Appearances and goals ==
Name	Nationality	Position	League		FA Cup		Total	
Name	Nationality	Position	Apps	Goals	Apps	Goals	Apps	Goals
William Bartlett	England	DF	35	2	5	0	40	2
Simon Beaton	England	DF	29	0	2	1	31	1
George Blackburn	England	DF	19	3	2	1	21	4
Fred Bullock	England	DF	25	0	0	0	25	0
Gordon Burniston	England	FW	3	1	2	1	5	2
James Campbell	England	GK	1	0	0	0	1	0
Robert Duxbury	England	DF	6	0	0	0	6	0
Fred Fayers	England	DF	22	0	5	2	27	2
Thomas Felstead	England	GK	2	0	0	0	2	0
William Grundy	England	FW	1	0	0	0	1	0
Ellis Hall	England	DF	24	1	1	0	25	1
Harold Hall	England	MF	20	0	5	1	25	1
Henry Hamilton	England	FW	16	10	4	3	20	13
James Howie	England	FW	26	3	0	0	26	3
Joe Jee	England	MF	37	11	4	1	41	12
James Macauley	Ireland	FW	24	6	0	0	24	6
Sandy McCubbin	Scotland	FW	11	5	5	2	16	7
George Metcalf	England	DF	2	0	2	0	4	0
Ernie Millward	England	MF	1	0	1	0	2	0
Charlie Morris	Wales	DF	16	0	4	0	20	0
Sandy Mutch	Scotland	GK	28	0	5	0	33	0
James Richardson	Scotland	FW	22	14	2	1	24	15
Leigh Richmond Roose	Wales	GK	5	0	0	0	5	0
Archie Taylor	Scotland	DF	29	0	5	0	34	0
Sam Whittingham	England	DF	0	0	1	0	1	0
Tom Wilcox	England	GK	2	0	0	0	2	0
John Wood	England	FW	10	0	0	0	10	0
James Wright	Ireland	DF	2	0	0	0	2	0
