= 1913–14 Huddersfield Town A.F.C. season =

Huddersfield Town
1913–14 season
- Chairman: William Hardcastle
- Manager: Arthur Fairclough
- Stadium: Leeds Road
- Football League Second Division: 13th
- FA Cup: Second round (eliminated by Birmingham)
- Top goalscorer: League: Frank Mann (10); All: Frank Mann (10)
- Highest home attendance: 12,000 vs Bradford Park Avenue (6 December 1913)
- Lowest home attendance: 2,500 vs Clapton Orient (21 March 1914)
- Biggest win: 7–0 vs Birmingham (25 October 1913)
- Biggest defeat: 1–5 vs Leeds City (14 March 1914)

Huddersfield Town's 1913–14 campaign was a particularly disappointing season following 5th place the previous season. Town would finish 13th, 15 points off Bradford (Park Avenue), who finished 2nd place.

== Squad at the start of the season ==
Note: Flags indicate national team as defined under FIFA eligibility rules; some limited exceptions apply. Players may hold more than one non-FIFA nationality.

Pos.	Nation	Player
GK	SCO	Sandy Mutch
DF	SCO	Simon Beaton
DF	ENG	Fred Blackman
DF	ENG	Harry Brough
DF	ENG	Fred Bullock
DF	ENG	James Dow
DF	ENG	Fred Fayers
DF	ENG	Norman Holmes
DF	ENG	Robert Ledger
DF	ENG	Harry Linley
DF	ENG	Larrett Roebuck

Pos.	Nation	Player
DF	ENG	Billy Watson
MF	SCO	Andrew Armour
MF	SCO	James Howie
MF	ENG	Joe Jee
MF	EIR	James Macauley
FW	SCO	Gilbert Christie
FW	ENG	Thomas Elliott
FW	ENG	Ernie Islip
FW	ENG	Frank Mann
FW	ENG	Bert Smith

== Review ==
After finishing 5th place in their 3rd season in the Football League, Town didn't live up to the standards set the previous season, with the only standout result being the 7–0 win over Birmingham in October. They finished in 13th place with only 34 points.

== Squad at the end of the season ==
Note: Flags indicate national team as defined under FIFA eligibility rules; some limited exceptions apply. Players may hold more than one non-FIFA nationality.

Pos.	Nation	Player
GK	ENG	Ted Davis
GK	SCO	Sandy Mutch
DF	SCO	Simon Beaton
DF	ENG	Harry Brough
DF	ENG	Fred Bullock
DF	ENG	James Dow
DF	ENG	Fred Fayers
DF	ENG	Norman Holmes
DF	ENG	Robert Ledger
DF	ENG	Harry Linley
DF	SCO	William McLaren

Pos.	Nation	Player
DF	ENG	Larrett Roebuck
DF	ENG	Billy Watson
MF	SCO	Andrew Armour
MF	ENG	Joe Jee
MF	ENG	Billy Smith
FW	SCO	Gilbert Christie
FW	ENG	Thomas Elliott
FW	ENG	Ernie Islip
FW	ENG	Frank Mann
FW	ENG	Bert Smith

== Results ==
=== Division Two ===
Date	Opponents	Home/ Away	Result F - A	Scorers	Attendance	Position
6 September 1913	Bury	H	1 - 1	Mann	7,884	12th
9 September 1913	Wolverhampton Wanderers	H	0 - 0		7,000	8th
13 September 1913	Fulham	A	0 - 1		25,000	14th
20 September 1913	Lincoln City	A	0 - 3		9,000	17th
27 September 1913	Blackpool	H	1 - 0	Jee	7,000	15th
4 October 1913	Nottingham Forest	A	1 - 1	Macauley	12,000	14th
11 October 1913	Woolwich Arsenal	H	1 - 2	Mann	8,000	16th
18 October 1913	Grimsby Town	A	1 - 2	Elliott	6,000	17th
25 October 1913	Birmingham	H	7 - 0	Bert Smith, Fayers, Ball (og), Macauley, Elliott (3)	5,000	16th
1 November 1913	Bristol City	A	0 - 1		10,000	16th
8 November 1913	Leeds City	H	1 - 1	Bert Smith	9,000	16th
15 November 1913	Clapton Orient	A	0 - 0		?	16th
22 November 1913	Glossop	H	2 - 1	Brough (2)	5,500	15th
1 December 1913	Stockport County	A	0 - 0		2,000	15th
6 December 1913	Bradford Park Avenue	H	0 - 1		12,000	16th
13 December 1913	Notts County	A	0 - 3		12,000	16th
20 December 1913	Leicester Fosse	H	1 - 2	James	5,500	16th
25 December 1913	Hull City	H	0 - 3		7,000	17th
26 December 1913	Hull City	A	1 - 4	Billy Smith	13,000	17th
27 December 1913	Bury	A	1 - 2	Armour	9,000	18th
1 January 1914	Barnsley	A	1 - 2	James	8,000	18th
3 January 1914	Fulham	H	3 - 1	Elliott, Armour, Jee	6,000	17th
17 January 1914	Lincoln City	H	2 - 1	McLaren (pen), Elliott	6,000	17th
24 January 1914	Blackpool	A	1 - 0	Mann	?	17th
7 February 1914	Nottingham Forest	H	1 - 1	Islip	4,500	17th
14 February 1914	Woolwich Arsenal	A	1 - 0	Mann	25,000	16th
21 February 1914	Grimsby Town	H	1 - 2	Mann	2,500	16th
28 February 1914	Birmingham	A	4 - 1	Womack (og), Jee, Elliott, Mann	7,000	16th
7 March 1914	Bristol City	H	1 - 2	Mann	5,000	16th
14 March 1914	Leeds City	A	1 - 5	Elliott	14,000	16th
21 March 1914	Clapton Orient	H	1 - 0	Elliott	2,000	16th
28 March 1914	Glossop	A	3 - 2	Slade (2), Mann	?	15th
4 April 1914	Stockport County	H	0 - 2		5,000	15th
11 April 1914	Bradford Park Avenue	A	1 - 2	McLaren (pen)	20,000	16th
13 April 1914	Wolverhampton Wanderers	A	2 - 2	Islip, Armour	13,000	16th
14 April 1914	Barnsley	H	3 - 1	Islip, Mann, Cooper (og)	11,000	16th
18 April 1914	Notts County	H	2 - 1	Morley (og), Mann	9,000	15th
25 April 1914	Leicester Fosse	A	1 - 0	Islip	6,000	13th

=== FA Cup ===
Date	Round	Opponents	Home/ Away	Result F - A	Scorers	Attendance
10 January 1914	Round 1	London Caledonians	H	3 - 0	Armour, Islip (2)	6,500
31 January 1914	Round 2	Birmingham	A	0 - 1		45,000

== Appearances and goals ==
Name	Nationality	Position	League		FA Cup		Total	
Name	Nationality	Position	Apps	Goals	Apps	Goals	Apps	Goals
Andrew Armour	England	MF	38	3	2	1	40	4
Simon Beaton	England	DF	34	0	2	0	36	0
Fred Blackman	England	DF	24	0	2	0	26	0
Harry Brough	England	DF	6	2	0	0	6	2
Fred Bullock	England	DF	25	0	0	0	25	0
Gilbert Christie	Scotland	FW	2	0	0	0	2	0
Ted Davis	England	GK	6	0	0	0	6	0
James Dow	England	DF	18	0	0	0	18	0
Thomas Elliott	England	FW	27	9	2	0	29	9
Fred Fayers	England	DF	30	1	1	0	31	1
Norman Holmes	England	DF	3	0	0	0	3	0
James Howie	England	FW	2	0	0	0	2	0
Ernie Islip	England	FW	21	4	2	2	23	6
Sidney James	England	DF	9	2	2	0	11	2
Joe Jee	England	MF	33	3	2	0	35	3
Robert Ledger	England	DF	1	0	0	0	1	0
Harry Linley	England	DF	18	0	2	0	20	0
James Macauley	Ireland	FW	10	2	0	0	10	2
Frank Mann	England	FW	19	10	0	0	19	10
William McLaren	Scotland	DF	18	2	1	0	19	2
Sandy Mutch	Scotland	GK	32	0	2	0	34	0
Larrett Roebuck	England	DF	17	0	2	0	19	0
Charlie Slade	England	DF	7	2	0	0	7	2
Bert Smith	England	FW	14	2	0	0	14	2
Billy Smith	England	MF	4	1	0	0	4	1
