= 1912–13 Huddersfield Town A.F.C. season =

Huddersfield Town
1912–13 season
- Chairman: William Hardcastle
- Manager: Arthur Fairclough
- Stadium: Leeds Road
- Football League Second Division: 5th
- FA Cup: Second round (eliminated by Swindon Town)
- Top goalscorer: League: Frank Mann (15); All: Frank Mann (16)
- Highest home attendance: 17,585 vs Swindon Town (1 February 1913)
- Lowest home attendance: 2,500 vs Clapton Orient (9 November 1912)
- Biggest win: 6–0 vs Glossop (8 March 1913)
- Biggest defeat: 0–4 vs Burnley (19 October 1912)
Home colours

Huddersfield Town's 1912–13 campaign was a season which saw Town establish themselves as a possible force to be reckoned with in Division 2. They would finish in 5th place under new manager Arthur Fairclough.

== Squad at the start of the season ==
Note: Flags indicate national team as defined under FIFA eligibility rules; some limited exceptions apply. Players may hold more than one non-FIFA nationality.

Pos.	Nation	Player
GK	ENG	Horace Husler
GK	SCO	Sandy Mutch
DF	SCO	Simon Beaton
DF	ENG	Fred Blackman
DF	ENG	Fred Bullock
DF	SCO	George Comrie
DF	SCO	Charles Dinnie
DF	ENG	James Dow
DF	ENG	Fred Fayers
DF	ENG	Charlie Milnes

Pos.	Nation	Player
DF	ENG	Joseph Wigmore
MF	SCO	Andrew Armour
MF	SCO	James Howie
MF	ENG	Joe Jee
MF	EIR	James Macauley
FW	ENG	George Crowther
FW	ENG	Thomas Elliott
FW	ENG	Bertram Gilboy
FW	ENG	Frederick Groves
FW	ENG	Frank Mann

== Review ==
After managing to survive the threat of liquidation the previous season, the team managed to emerge as a force in Division 2 under Arthur Fairclough. The attacking forces of James Macauley and Frank Mann helped Town reach 5th place, just 7 points behind 2nd placed Burnley.

== Squad at the end of the season ==
Note: Flags indicate national team as defined under FIFA eligibility rules; some limited exceptions apply. Players may hold more than one non-FIFA nationality.

Pos.	Nation	Player
GK	ENG	Horace Husler
GK	SCO	Sandy Mutch
DF	SCO	Simon Beaton
DF	ENG	Fred Blackman
DF	ENG	Fred Bullock
DF	SCO	George Comrie
DF	ENG	James Dow
DF	ENG	Fred Fayers
DF	ENG	Charlie Milnes
DF	ENG	Billy Watson

Pos.	Nation	Player
DF	ENG	Joseph Wigmore
MF	SCO	Andrew Armour
MF	SCO	James Howie
MF	ENG	Joe Jee
MF	EIR	James Macauley
FW	ENG	George Crowther
FW	ENG	Thomas Elliott
FW	ENG	Bertram Gilboy
FW	ENG	Frederick Groves
FW	ENG	Frank Mann

== Results ==
=== Division Two ===
Date	Opponents	Home/ Away	Result F - A	Scorers	Attendance	Position
3 September 1912	Bury	H	4 - 0	T. Millington (og), Elliott, Macauley, Jee	6,000	1st
7 September 1912	Barnsley	A	0 - 2		10,000	8th
14 September 1912	Bradford Park Avenue	H	2 - 0	Howie, Elliott	8,000	5th
16 September 1912	Fulham	A	0 - 2		12,000	8th
21 September 1912	Wolverhampton Wanderers	A	0 - 2		12,000	12th
28 September 1912	Leicester Fosse	H	3 - 0	Howie, Macauley (2)	7,000	10th
5 October 1912	Stockport County	A	1 - 3	Jee	7,000	12th
12 October 1912	Preston North End	H	1 - 1	Elliott	9,000	13th
19 October 1912	Burnley	A	0 - 4		13,000	14th
26 October 1912	Hull City	H	5 - 2	Fayers (2), Howie, Macauley, Bullock	5,000	13th
2 November 1912	Glossop	A	0 - 1		?	13th
9 November 1912	Clapton Orient	H	0 - 0		2,500	15th
16 November 1912	Lincoln City	A	1 - 3	Macauley	10,000	15th
23 November 1912	Nottingham Forest	H	1 - 1	Macauley	3,000	13th
30 November 1912	Bristol City	A	0 - 0		6,000	14th
7 December 1912	Birmingham	H	0 - 0		7,500	13th
14 December 1912	Blackpool	H	3 - 0	Jee, Howie (2)	3,500	10th
21 December 1912	Leeds City	A	3 - 0	Mann (2), Howie	15,000	9th
25 December 1912	Bury	A	2 - 0	Fayers (pen), Mann	6,500	8th
26 December 1912	Grimsby Town	H	0 - 2		9,000	8th
28 December 1912	Barnsley	H	2 - 0	Bratley (og), Armour	11,000	7th
4 January 1913	Bradford Park Avenue	A	1 - 2	S. Blackham (og)	12,000	10th
25 January 1913	Leicester Fosse	A	0 - 0		10,000	12th
8 February 1913	Stockport County	H	3 - 3	Howie, Jee, Mann	4,000	12th
15 February 1913	Preston North End	A	1 - 2	Elliott	15,000	13th
26 February 1913	Burnley	H	1 - 0	Fayers (pen)	4,500	10th
1 March 1913	Hull City	A	3 - 1	Fayers, Mann, Jee	6,000	8th
8 March 1913	Glossop	H	6 - 0	Mann (2), Macauley (2), Elliott, Fayers (pen)	4,000	8th
12 March 1913	Wolverhampton Wanderers	H	2 - 1	Fayers (pen), Mann	3,500	5th
15 March 1913	Clapton Orient	A	1 - 1	Mann	8,000	5th
22 March 1913	Lincoln City	H	5 - 1	Mann (2), Macauley, Elliott, Jee	3,500	5th
24 March 1913	Grimsby Town	A	0 - 0		7,000	6th
25 March 1913	Fulham	H	5 - 1	Elliott, Fayers, Howie, Macauley (2)	10,000	5th
29 March 1913	Nottingham Forest	A	1 - 0	Macauley	20,000	4th
5 April 1913	Bristol City	H	5 - 0	Mann (3), Elliott, Jee	7,500	5th
12 April 1913	Birmingham	A	2 - 3	Macauley, Elliott	10,000	5th
19 April 1913	Blackpool	A	1 - 2	Mann	2,000	5th
26 April 1913	Leeds City	H	1 - 0	Armour	9,000	5th

=== FA Cup ===
Date	Round	Opponents	Home/ Away	Result F - A	Scorers	Attendance
15 January 1913	Round 1	Sheffield United	H	3 - 1	Mann, Elliott (2)	8,187
1 February 1913	Round 2	Swindon Town	H	1 - 2	Macauley	17,585

== Appearances and goals ==
Name	Nationality	Position	League		FA Cup		Total	
Name	Nationality	Position	Apps	Goals	Apps	Goals	Apps	Goals
Andrew Armour	England	MF	36	2	2	0	38	2
Simon Beaton	England	DF	24	0	2	0	26	0
Fred Blackman	England	DF	36	0	1	0	37	0
Fred Bullock	England	DF	38	1	2	0	40	1
George Comrie	Scotland	DF	15	0	0	0	15	0
George Crowther	England	FW	2	0	0	0	2	0
Charles Dinnie	Scotland	DF	1	0	1	0	2	0
James Dow	England	DF	23	0	2	0	25	0
Thomas Elliott	England	FW	34	9	1	2	35	11
Fred Fayers	England	DF	37	8	2	0	39	8
Bertram Gilboy	England	FW	3	0	0	0	3	0
Frederick Groves	England	FW	4	0	0	0	4	0
James Howie	England	FW	24	8	2	0	26	8
Horace Husler	England	GK	1	0	0	0	1	0
Joe Jee	England	MF	38	7	2	0	40	7
James Macauley	Ireland	FW	26	13	1	1	27	14
Frank Mann	England	FW	23	15	2	1	25	16
Charlie Milnes	England	DF	14	0	0	0	14	0
Sandy Mutch	Scotland	GK	37	0	2	0	39	0
Billy Watson	England	DF	1	0	0	0	1	0
Joseph Wigmore	England	DF	1	0	0	0	1	0
