= 1921–22 Brentford F.C. season =

English football team season

Brentford
1921–22 season
- Chairman: H. Jason-Saunders
- Manager: Archie Mitchell
- Stadium: Griffin Park
- Third Division South: 9th
- FA Cup: First round
- Top goalscorer: League: Morris (16); All: Morris (17)
- Highest home attendance: 13,836
- Lowest home attendance: 4,000
- Average home league attendance: 9,115
Home colours

During the 1921–22 English football season, Brentford competed in the Football League Third Division South. The club improved on its debut season in the league to finish 9th, which would be its highest placing until 1929–30.

== Season summary ==
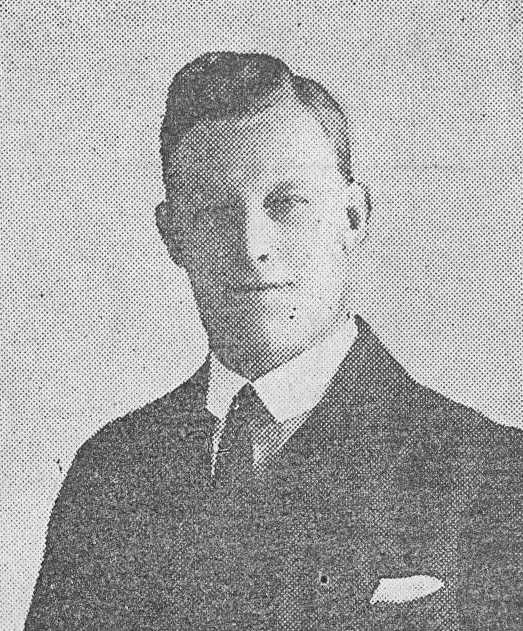
Archie Mitchell took over as player-manager for the 1921–22 season.

After a torrid first season in the Football League, Archie Mitchell joined Brentford as player-manager and the club's squad was overhauled. Outgoing manager Fred Halliday stayed at Griffin Park as secretary, which allowed Mitchell to focus solely on the team. New signings Charles Alton and John Bethune bolstered the defence, half backs Charles Fisher and James Kerr came in and Thomas Elliott and Harry Morris were signed to replace the previous season's departed leading goalscorers Harry King and Reginald Boyne. Cricketer and outside forward Patsy Hendren was available for much of the season.

Brentford began the season inconsistently and hovered around mid-table, before a run of just four defeats in 17 games firmly established the club in the top six by January 1922. Forwards Harry Morris and Harry Anstiss scored the majority of the team's goals and player-manager Mitchell had dropped himself from the team in favour of Cyril Hunter in December 1921. On 11 February 1922, Freddy Capper became the first Brentford player to be sent off in a Football League match. He received his marching orders from referee Harry Curtis, who would later be appointed as Brentford's manager in 1926. Five defeats in seven matches during February and March, coupled with poor away form throughout the season, ruled out the possibility of automatic promotion, but the team finished strongly and won five of the final eight matches to finish 9th. Brentford won just one away league match during the season, which is the joint-fewest in club history.

A rare event occurred on the final day of the season at Swansea Town's Vetch Field, when Brentford were able to field just 9 men at the kick off. William Young, Harry Anstiss and Freddy Capper missed their train at Paddington and manager Archie Mitchell was pressed into service as an emergency goalkeeper.

== League table ==
Pos	Team	Pld	W	D	L	GF	GA	GD	Pts
7	Watford	42	13	18	11	54	48	+6	44
8	Aberdare Athletic	42	17	10	15	57	51	+6	44
9	Brentford	42	16	11	15	52	43	+9	43
10	Swansea Town	42	13	15	14	50	47	+3	41
11	Merthyr Town	42	17	6	19	45	56	−11	40

== Results ==
Brentford's goal tally listed first.

=== Legend ===
Win	Draw	Loss

=== Football League Third Division South ===
No.	Date	Opponent	Venue	Result	Attendance	Scorer(s)
1	27 August 1921	Merthyr Town	H	0–1	11,000	
2	29 August 1921	Southend United	A	1–1	6,000	Morris
3	3 September 1921	Merthyr Town	A	0–2	6,000	
4	5 September 1921	Southend United	H	1–0	8,000	Bertram
5	10 September 1921	Watford	H	1–1	10,732	Morris
6	14 September 1921	Bristol Rovers	A	0–0	7,000	
7	17 September 1921	Watford	A	0–0	7,000	
8	24 September 1921	Charlton Athletic	H	0–2	13,000	
9	1 October 1921	Charlton Athletic	A	1–1	12,000	Anstiss
10	8 October 1921	Northampton Town	H	1–0	9,000	Morris
11	15 October 1921	Northampton Town	A	0–2	6,000	
12	21 October 1921	Queens Park Rangers	H	5–1	13,836	Morris (3), T. Elliott, Bertram
13	29 October 1921	Queens Park Rangers	A	1–1	15,000	Mitchell (pen)
14	5 November 1921	Portsmouth	H	2–2	11,000	Mitchell (pen), Morris
15	12 November 1921	Portsmouth	A	0–1	12,894	
16	19 November 1921	Norwich City	A	0–0	6,000	
17	26 November 1921	Norwich City	H	2–1	5,000	Shields, Morris
18	10 December 1921	Reading	A	3–0	8,000	Anstiss (2), Morris
19	24 December 1921	Bristol Rovers	H	4–2	10,000	T. Elliott, Anstiss (2), Morris
20	26 December 1921	Aberdare Athletic	H	2–1	12,000	T. Elliott, Anstiss
21	27 December 1921	Aberdare Athletic	A	0–2	11,000	
22	31 December 1921	Southampton	A	0–0	10,000	
23	14 January 1922	Southampton	H	1–0	10,000	T. Elliott (pen)
24	21 January 1922	Plymouth Argyle	H	3–1	7,000	Morris (2), Norton
25	28 January 1922	Plymouth Argyle	A	1–4	7,000	Morris
26	4 February 1922	Newport County	H	1–0	6,000	T. Elliott
27	11 February 1922	Newport County	A	1–2	6,500	Norton
28	18 February 1922	Luton Town	H	0–2	9,000	
29	25 February 1922	Luton Town	A	0–3	5,000	
30	4 March 1922	Swindon Town	H	3–0	5,000	Anstiss, Norton, Amos
31	11 March 1922	Swindon Town	A	1–2	6,000	T. Elliott
32	18 March 1922	Gillingham	A	0–0	8,000	
33	25 March 1922	Gillingham	H	0–1	6,000	
34	1 April 1922	Millwall	A	1–1	12,000	Morris
35	8 April 1922	Millwall	H	1–0	6,000	Anstiss
36	14 April 1922	Brighton & Hove Albion	H	4–0	10,000	Anstiss (3), Hendren
37	15 April 1922	Exeter City	A	0–1	5,000	
38	17 April 1922	Brighton & Hove Albion	A	1–2	9,008	Anstiss
39	18 April 1922	Reading	H	2–0	5,000	Anstiss, T. Elliott
40	24 April 1922	Exeter City	H	5–2	4,000	Anstiss, Kerr, Morris, Capper, Amos
41	29 April 1922	Swansea Town	A	0–1	5,000	
42	6 May 1922	Swansea Town	H	3–1	5,000	Morris, T. Elliott, Anstiss

=== FA Cup ===
Round	Date	Opponent	Venue	Result	Attendance	Scorer(s)
5QR	3 December 1921	Dulwich Hamlet	H	3–1	9,078	Capper, Mitchell, Morris
6QR	17 December 1921	Shildon Athletic	H	1–0	9,250	T. Elliott
R1	7 January 1922	Tottenham Hotspur	H	0–2	12,964	

- Sources: Statto, 100 Years of Brentford, The Complete History

== Playing squad ==
Players' ages are as of the opening day of the 1921–22 season.

Pos.	Name	Nat.	Date of birth (age)	Signed from	Signed in	Notes
Goalkeepers
GK	William Young	(England)	4 August 1892 (aged 29)	South Shields	1920	
Defenders
DF	Charles Alton	(England)	24 December 1891 (aged 29)	Rotherham County	1921	
DF	John Bethune	(Scotland)	19 October 1888 (aged 32)	Bristol Rovers	1921	
DF	Bertie Rosier	(England)	21 March 1893 (aged 28)	Southall	1913	
Midfielders
HB	Alf Amos	(England)	9 February 1893 (aged 28)	Old Kingstonians	1913	
HB	Jimmy Elliott	(England)	1891 (aged 29–30)	Tottenham Hotspur	1920	
HB	Charles Fisher	(England)	9 June 1899 (aged 22)	Kidderminster Harriers	1921	
HB	Fred Howe	(England)	1895 (aged 25–26)	Kimberworth Old Boys	1920	
HB	Cyril Hunter	(England)	8 February 1898 (aged 23)	Leadgate Park	1921	
HB	James Kerr	(Scotland)	7 April 1894 (aged 27)	Blackburn Rovers	1921	Amateur
HB	Archie Mitchell	(England)	15 December 1885 (aged 35)	Queens Park Rangers	1921	Manager
Forwards
FW	Harry Anstiss	(England)	22 August 1899 (aged 22)	Hammersmith Athletic	1920	
FW	George Bertram	(England)	15 January 1896 (aged 25)	Fulham	1921	
FW	Freddy Capper	(England)	8 May 1892 (aged 30)	The Wednesday	1921	
FW	Thomas Elliott	(England)	6 April 1890 (aged 31)	Nottingham Forest	1921	
FW	Patsy Hendren (c)	(England)	5 February 1889 (aged 32)	Queens Park Rangers	1911	Played when his cricket commitments allowed
FW	Harry Morris	(England)	25 November 1897 (aged 23)	Fulham	1921	
FW	Horace Norton	(England)	15 September 1896 (aged 24)	Bradford City	1921	
FW	George Pither	(England)	24 June 1899 (aged 22)	Isleworth Town	1921	
FW	Ralph Shields	(England)	13 February 1892 (aged 29)	Exeter City	1921	

- Sources: 100 Years of Brentford, Timeless Bees, Football League Players' Records 1888 to 1939

== Coaching staff ==
Name	Role
(England) Archie Mitchell	Manager
(England) Michael Witham	Trainer

== Statistics ==
=== Appearances and goals ===

Brentford's highest appearance-makers in each position during the Football League season.

Pos	Nat	Name	League		FA Cup		Total	
Pos	Nat	Name	Apps	Goals	Apps	Goals	Apps	Goals
GK	(England)	William Young	41	0	3	0	44	0
DF	(England)	Charles Alton	36	0	3	0	39	0
DF	(Scotland)	John Bethune	10	0	0	0	10	0
DF	(England)	Bertie Rosier	34	0	3	0	37	0
HB	(England)	Alf Amos	40	2	3	0	43	2
HB	(England)	Jimmy Elliott	27	0	3	0	30	0
HB	(England)	Charles Fisher	6	0	0	0	6	0
HB	(England)	Fred Howe	1	0	0	0	1	0
HB	(England)	Cyril Hunter	21	0	—		21	0
HB	(Scotland)	James Kerr	21	1	0	0	21	1
HB	(England)	Archie Mitchell	13	2	3	1	16	3
FW	(England)	Harry Anstiss	23	15	2	0	25	15
FW	(England)	George Bertram	10	2	0	0	10	2
FW	(England)	Freddy Capper	35	1	3	1	38	2
FW	(England)	Thomas Elliott	39	8	3	1	42	9
FW	(England)	Patsy Hendren	35	1	3	0	38	1
FW	(England)	Harry Morris	36	16	3	1	39	17
FW	(England)	Horace Norton	19	3	0	0	19	3
FW	(England)	George Pither	7	0	0	0	7	0
FW	(England)	Ralph Shields	8	1	1	0	9	1

- Players listed in italics left the club mid-season.
- Source: 100 Years of Brentford

=== Goalscorers ===
Pos.	Nat	Player	FL3	FAC	Total
FW	(England)	Harry Morris	16	1	17
FW	(England)	Harry Anstiss	15	0	15
FW	(England)	Thomas Elliott	8	1	9
FW	(England)	Horace Norton	3	0	3
HB	(England)	Archie Mitchell	2	1	3
HB	(England)	Alf Amos	2	0	2
FW	(England)	George Bertram	2	0	2
HB	(England)	Jimmy Elliott	2	0	2
FW	(England)	Freddy Capper	1	1	2
FW	(England)	Patsy Hendren	1	0	1
HB	(Scotland)	James Kerr	1	0	1
FW	(England)	Ralph Shields	1	0	1
Total			52	4	58

- Players listed in italics left the club mid-season.
- Source: 100 Years of Brentford

=== Management ===
Name	Nat	From	To	Record All Comps					Record League				
Name	Nat	From	To	P	W	D	L	W %	P	W	D	L	W %
Archie Mitchell	(England)	27 August 1921	6 May 1922	45	18	11	16	40.00|	42	16	11	15	38.10

=== Summary ===
Games played	45 (42 Third Division South, 3 FA Cup)
Games won	18 (16 Third Division South, 2 FA Cup)
Games drawn	11 (11 Third Division, 0 FA Cup)
Games lost	16 (15 Third Division, 1 FA Cup)
Goals scored	56 (52 Third Division, 4 FA Cup)
Goals conceded	46 (43 Third Division, 3 FA Cup)
Clean sheets	15 (14 Third Division, 1 FA Cup)
Biggest league win	4–0 versus Brighton & Hove Albion, 14 April 1922; 5–1 versus Queens Park Rangers, 21 October 1921
Worst league defeat	3–0 versus Luton Town, 25 February 1922
Most appearances	44, William Young (41 Third Division South, 3 FA Cup)
Top scorer (league)	16, Harry Morris
Top scorer (all competitions)	17, Harry Morris

== Transfers & loans ==
Cricketers are not included in this list.

Players transferred in
Date	Pos.	Name	Previous club	Fee	Ref.
June 1921	FW	(England) George Bertram	(England) Fulham	Free	
June 1921	FW	(England) Harry Morris	(England) Fulham	Free	
July 1921	FW	(England) Ralph Shields	(England) Exeter City	Free	
20 August 1921	FW	(England) George Pither	(England) Isleworth Town	Amateur	
August 1921	DF	(Scotland) John Bethune	(England) Bristol Rovers	Free	
August 1921	FW	(England) Freddy Capper	(England) The Wednesday	Free	
August 1921	FW	(England) Thomas Elliott	(England) Nottingham Forest	Free	
August 1921	HB	(England) Archie Mitchell	(England) Queens Park Rangers	Free	
August 1921	GK	(England) Edmund Wright	(England) Aston Villa	Free	
September 1921	GK	(England) Ted Price	(England) Queens Park Rangers	Free	
October 1921	HB	(England) Cyril Hunter	(England) Leadgate Park	Free	
1921	DF	(England) Charles Alton	(England) Rotherham County	Free	
1921	HB	(England) Charles Fisher	(England) Kidderminster Harriers	Free	
1921	HB	(Scotland) James Kerr	(England) Blackburn Rovers	Amateur	
1921	FW	(England) Horace Norton	(England) Bradford City	Free	
Players released
Date	Pos.	Name	Subsequent club	Join date	Ref.
May 1922	FW	(England) George Bertram	(England) Sittingbourne	1922	
May 1922	DF	(Scotland) John Bethune	(England) Sittingbourne	July 1922	
May 1922	HB	(England) Charles Fisher	(England) Margate	n/a	
May 1922	HB	(England) Fred Howe	(England) Peterborough & Fletton United	n/a	
May 1922	HB	(England) Archie Mitchell	Retired		
May 1922	FW	(England) Horace Norton	(England) Darlington	1922	
May 1922	DF	(England) Archie Reay	(England) Gillingham	July 1922	
May 1922	FW	(England) Ralph Shields	(England) Sittingbourne	1922	
