= Horace Norton =

English footballer (1896–1976)

Personal information
- Full name: Horace Arthur Norton
- Date of birth: 15 September 1896
- Place of birth: Cleckheaton, England
- Date of death: March 1976 (aged 79)
- Place of death: Darlington, England
- Positions: Forward; right half

Youth career
- Bowling Albion
- Cleckheaton

Senior career*
Years	Team	Apps	(Gls)
1915–1921	Bradford City	12	(1)
1921–1922	Brentford	19	(3)
1922	Darlington	0	(0)
- * Club domestic league appearances and goals

Horace Arthur Norton (15 September 1896 – March 1976) was an English professional footballer who played as a forward and right half in the Football League for Brentford and Bradford City.

== Career statistics ==
Appearances and goals by club, season and competition
Club	Season	League			FA Cup		Total	
Club	Season	Division	Apps	Goals	Apps	Goals	Apps	Goals
Bradford City	1919–20	First Division	9	1	0	0	9	1
Bradford City	1920–21	First Division	3	0	0	0	3	0
Bradford City	Total		12	1	0	0	12	1
Brentford	1921–22	Third Division South	19	3	0	0	19	3
Career total			31	4	0	0	31	4
