= Wigmore =

Wigmore may refer to:

== People ==
- Ann Wigmore, U.S. holistic health practitioner
- Ben Wigmore (b. 1982), Australian baseball player
- Clive Wigmore (1892–1969), English footballer
- Gillian Wigmore (b. 1976), Canadian poet
- Gin Wigmore (b. 1986), New Zealand singer-songwriter
- John Henry Wigmore (1863–1943), U.S. jurist, or his book, Treatise on the Anglo-American System of Evidence in Trials at Common Law (often known as "Wigmore on Evidence" or "Wigmore")
- Joseph Wigmore (b. 1892), English footballer
- Lionel Wigmore (1899–1989), Australian military historian and journalist
- Lucy Wigmore, New Zealand actress
- Robert Wigmore (b. 1949), Cook Islands politician
- Rupert Wilson Wigmore (1873–1939), Canadian politician
- Walter Wigmore (1873–1931), English footballer
- William Campion (Jesuit), alias William Wigmore, (1599–1665), an English Jesuit

== Places ==
- Wigmore, Luton, Bedfordshire, England
- Wigmore, Herefordshire, England
- Wigmore, Kent, England
- Wigmore Street, in the West End of London

== Buildings ==
- Wigmore Abbey, Herefordshire, England, a ruined Augustinian abbey
- Wigmore Castle, Herefordshire, England, a ruined castle
- Wigmore Hall, London, a concert hall

== Other ==
- Wigmore Athletic, a former football club in Sussex, England (merged into Worthing United F.C.)
