= Brebner =

Brebner is a surname, and may refer to:

- Dominique Brebner or Dominique Jackson (model), Tobagonian-American transgender actor and model.
- Grant Brebner (born 1977) is a Scottish football player and manager.
- Morwyn Brebner, Canadian playwright, television writer and producer.
- Ronald Brebner (1881–1914), English amateur football player.
