= William Hardcastle =

William Hardcastle may refer to:

- Bill Hardcastle (1874–1944), New Zealand and Australian national representative rugby union and rugby league player
- William Hardcastle (broadcaster) (1918–1975), British journalist and radio news presenter
- William Hardcastle (football chairman), see 1912–13 Huddersfield Town F.C. season
