= 1918–19 Huddersfield Town A.F.C. season =

Huddersfield Town
1918–19 season
- Chairman: William Hardcastle
- Manager: Arthur Fairclough
- Stadium: Leeds Road
- Wartime League Midland Section Sudsibiary Comepition Section "C": 6th 3rd
- Top goalscorer: League: All: Ralph Shields (10)
- Highest home attendance: 8,000 vs Leeds City (29 March 1919)
- Lowest home attendance: 1,000 vs Sheffield United (3 June 1918)
- Biggest win: 5–0 vs Bradford City (5 April 1919)
- Biggest defeat: 1–7 vs Coventry City (26 October 1918)

Huddersfield Town's 1918–19 campaign was the last season of wartime football before the end of World War I. Town played in the Midland League and finished in 6th place, as well as 3rd place in Section "C" of the Subsidiary Competition.

== Results ==
=== Midland Division ===
Date	Opponents	Home/Away	Result F–A	Scorers	Attendance
7 September 1918	Sheffield United	A	1–5	Crowther	10,000
14 September 1918	Sheffield United	H	1–0	Crowther	1,000
21 September 1918	Bradford (Park Avenue)	A	2–2	Elliott (2)	3,500
28 September 1918	Bradford (Park Avenue)	H	0–0		3,000
5 October 1918	Hull City	A	0–3		3,000
12 October 1918	Hull City	H	1–0	Best	2,000
19 October 1918	Coventry City	H	4–1	Crowther (2), Elliott, Broadhead	?
26 October 1918	Coventry City	A	1–7	Jee	?
2 November 1918	Barnsley	H	2–1	T.J. Tindall (og), Elliott	?
9 November 1918	Barnsley	A	4–2	Mann, Crowther (3)	1,500
16 November 1918	Leicester Fosse	H	2–0	Crowther, Foster	2,500
23 November 1918	Leicester Fosse	A	1–3	J. Baker	3,000
30 November 1918	Nottingham Forest	H	0–0		3,000: Match abandoned after 79 minutes due to poor light, but the result was allowed to stand.
7 December 1918	Nottingham Forest	A	0–1		8,000
14 December 1918	Grimsby Town	A	1–1	Buddery	2,000
21 December 1918	Grimsby Town	H	1–0	Buddery	2,000
25 December 1918	Leeds City	A	1–1	Mann	5,000
26 December 1918	Leeds City	H	0–1		7,500
28 December 1918	Lincoln City	A	4–1	Foster, Crowther, Elliott, Buddery	4,000
4 January 1919	Lincoln City	H	?		?: Match abandoned due to bad weather.
11 January 1919	Rotherham County	A	1–2	Broadhead	8,000
18 January 1919	Rotherham County	H	5–1	Elliott (2), Mann (2), A. Baker	?
25 January 1919	Birmingham	A	0–1		12,000
1 February 1919	Birmingham	H	1–0	Shields	2,500
8 February 1919	Notts County	H	1–1	Shields	5,500
15 February 1919	Notts County	A	2–6	Shields, Broadhead	10,000
22 February 1919	Bradford City	H	1–1	Elliott	?
1 March 1919	Bradford City	A	3–2	Cock, Shields (2)	7,000
8 March 1919	Sheffield Wednesday	A	3–1	J. Baker, Shields, Mann	10,000
15 March 1919	Sheffield Wednesday	H	2–1	Shields (2)	5,000
21 April 1919	Lincoln City	H	0–0		4,500

=== Section "C" ===
Date	Opponents	Home/Away	Result F–A	Scorers	Attendance
22 March 1919	Leeds City	A	0–3		9,000
29 March 1919	Leeds City	H	1–0	Mann (pen)	8,000
5 April 1919	Bradford City	H	5–0	Shields (2), Mann, Slade, A. Baker	?
12 April 1919	Bradford City	A	0–0		7,000
19 April 1919	Bradford (Park Avenue)	H	0–0		7,500
26 April 1919	Bradford (Park Avenue)	A	1–1	Mann	5,000
