= William Campion =

William Campion may refer to:

- William Campion (governor), British MP for Lewes and governor of Western Australia
- William Campion (died 1615) (1549–1615), MP for Haslemere
- William Campion (mathematician) (1820–1896), mathematician and president of Queens' College, Cambridge
- William Campion (Jesuit) (1599–1665), English Jesuit
- William Campion (organist), organist of Chichester Cathedral
- William Campion (1640–1702), MP for Kent
- Bill Campion (born 1952), American basketball player
- SS William Campion, the name for SS Oakmar while in service with the Garland Steamship Corporation
