= Norman Holmes =

Norman Holmes may refer to:

- Norman Holmes (footballer) (1890–1965), English footballer
- Norman Holmes (tennis) (born 1949), American tennis player

== See also ==
- Norman Holmes Pearson (1909–1975), American academic at Yale University
