= Harry Morris (footballer, born 1897) =

English footballer and manager

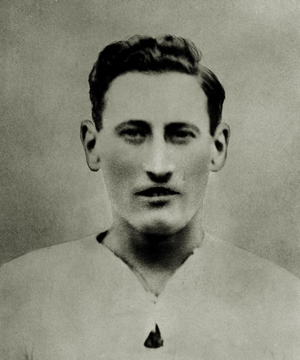
- Morris while with Brentford in 1921.

Personal information
- Full name: David Hyman Morris
- Date of birth: 25 November 1897
- Place of birth: Spitalfields, England
- Date of death: 1 December 1985 (aged 88)
- Place of death: San Mateo, California, United States
- Position: Forward

Youth career
- –1919: Vicar of Wakefield

Senior career*
| Years | Team | Apps | (Gls) |
| 1919–1921 | Fulham | 6 | (2) |
| 1921–1923 | Brentford | 59 | (29) |
| 1923–1925 | Millwall | 74 | (30) |
| 1925–1926 | Swansea Town | 9 | (5) |
| 1926–1933 | Swindon Town | 260 | (215) |
| 1933–1934 | Clapton Orient | 13 | (8) |
- Cheltenham Town
| Total | | 421 | (289) |

Managerial career
- 1938–1941: IFK Göteborg
- * Club domestic league appearances and goals

David Hyman Morris (25 November 1897 – 1 December 1985), known as Harry Morris or Abe Morris, was an English professional footballer, best remembered for his seven-year spell as a forward in the Football League with Swindon Town.

Morris was voted Swindon Town's greatest-ever player by the club's supporters in 2013 and holds the club records for goals scored in a league match, season and career. He also played League football for Fulham, Brentford, Millwall, Swansea Town and Clapton Orient. He later managed Swedish club IFK Göteborg.

== Playing career ==
=== Fulham ===
After being spotted by Phil Kelso scoring prolifically for local Hackney Marshes side Vicar of Wakefield, Morris joined Second Division club Fulham in May 1919. He spent most of his time with the club in the reserve team and scored heavily. Morris managed seven first team appearances, scoring twice. He departed Craven Cottage in June 1921.

=== Brentford ===
Morris transferred to Third Division South club Brentford in June 1921. With the Bees having finished second-from-bottom in their first season in the league, he helped inspire the side to a 9th-place finish in the 1921–22 season, top-scoring with 17 goals in 39 appearances. He top-scored again during the 1922–23 season (with 13 goals from 24 appearances), before departing Griffin Park in February 1923. Morris made 63 appearances and scored 30 goals during his 18 months with the Bees.

=== Millwall ===
In February 2023, Morris moved to Third Division South club Millwall for a £750 fee. Over the course of his time with the club, he scored 30 goals in 76 appearances for the Lions as the club consistently challenged for promotion to the Second Division. He departed The Den in May 1925.

=== Swansea Town ===
Morris moved back up to the Second Division to sign for Swansea Town in May 1925. He remained with the club for one season and made just 9 appearances.

=== Swindon Town ===
Morris dropped back down to the Third Division South to transfer to Swindon Town in June 1926 for a £110 fee. He had a brilliant start to his career at the County Ground, netting hat-tricks in each of his first two matches. He scored in the following two matches to set a club record of scoring in each of his first four games, which stood until it was matched in September 2014 by Jonathan Obika. Flourishing under Sam Allen's management, Morris finished the 1926–27 season with 48 goals from 43 league games (a club record which still stands as of 2025), but problems with the defence meant the Robins could only manage a fifth-place finish. He also became the first Swindon player to score five goals in a single game, which came in a win over Queens Park Rangers. He repeated the feat in a 5–1 demolition of Norwich City in April 1930. He also went on a run of scoring in 11 consecutive games during the season, scoring 19 goals.

Despite failing to win any silverware, Morris was top scorer in each of his seven seasons with Swindon and scored 18 hat-tricks. In addition, he was top scorer in the Third Division South in the 1926–27 and 1927–28 seasons and his record for the 1926–27 season stands at the eighth-highest single-season goal tally in Football League history. Deemed too old by incoming manager Ted Vizard, Morris was released prior to the start of the 1933–34 season.

During his seven years with Swindon, Morris scored 229 goals in 279 games and as of 2025 is still the club's leading goalscorer. His overall league goalscoring record is the joint 16th-highest in English football history as of 2025. In 1955, 22 years after leaving the County Ground, Morris applied for a coaching role with the club, but was rejected. In a poll to celebrate the Football League's 125th anniversary, Morris was voted Swindon's greatest-ever player by the club's supporters.

=== Clapton Orient ===
Morris transferred to Third Division South club Clapton Orient in July 1933 and scored eight goals in 13 appearances during the 1933–34 season.

=== Cheltenham Town ===
Morris wound down his career in non-League football with Southern League club Cheltenham Town.

== International career ==
Morris was called up by England for a trial match, but injury prevented him from taking part.

== Managerial career ==
Morris managed IFK Göteborg between 1938 and 1941. He won promotion from Division 2 via the play-offs in his first season and achieved 2nd and 6th-place finishes in the following two Allsvenskan seasons respectively. He also won the 1939–40 Distriktsmästerskapet. Morris ended his spell with a winning percentage of 67%.

== Personal life ==
Morris was Jewish. Though he was observant of the faith, he played on Saturdays during his football career and only refused to play on high holidays. He was educated at the Jews' Free School in London and was a member of the Brady Street Boys' Club. He served in the Middlesex Regiment during the First World War. Morris was married to Edith and had a son, Jack and a daughter, Estelle, who died from polio in 1937 at the age of eight. Morris, Edith and Jack emigrated shortly afterwards to Gothenburg, Sweden, where Morris worked at the British Consulate. The outbreak of the Second World War in 1939 and the invasion of Norway by the Germans the following year saw Morris and his family remain in neutral Sweden until the end of the war. Through his job at the consulate, Morris helped escaped POWs return to the UK. The family emigrated to the United States after the war, with Harry and Edith working for the British Information Services in New York City. They retired to San Mateo, California, where Edith died in 1984, followed a year later by Harry.

== Career statistics ==
Appearances and goals by club, season and competition
| Club | Season | League | | | FA Cup | | Total | |
| Club | Season | Division | Apps | Goals | Apps | Goals | Apps | Goals |
|---|---|---|---|---|---|---|---|---|
| Fulham | 1920–21 | Second Division | 6 | 2 | 1 | 0 | 7 | 2 |
| Brentford | 1921–22 | Third Division South | 36 | 16 | 3 | 1 | 39 | 17 |
| Brentford | 1922–23 | Third Division South | 23 | 13 | 1 | 0 | 24 | 13 |
| Brentford | Total | | 59 | 29 | 4 | 1 | 63 | 30 |
| Millwall | 1922–23 | Third Division South | 14 | 8 | — | | 14 | 8 |
| Millwall | 1923–24 | Third Division South | 37 | 17 | 1 | 0 | 38 | 17 |
| Millwall | 1924–25 | Third Division South | 23 | 5 | 1 | 0 | 24 | 5 |
| Millwall | Total | | 74 | 30 | 2 | 0 | 76 | 30 |
| Swindon Town | 1926–27 | Third Division South | 41 | 47 | 2 | 1 | 43 | 48 |
| Swindon Town | 1927–28 | Third Division South | 37 | 38 | 5 | 6 | 42 | 44 |
| Swindon Town | 1928–29 | Third Division South | 38 | 26 | 5 | 5 | 43 | 31 |
| Swindon Town | 1929–30 | Third Division South | 38 | 28 | 3 | 1 | 41 | 29 |
| Swindon Town | 1930–31 | Third Division South | 40 | 35 | 1 | 0 | 41 | 35 |
| Swindon Town | 1931–32 | Third Division South | 38 | 29 | 1 | 0 | 39 | 29 |
| Swindon Town | 1932–33 | Third Division South | 28 | 12 | 2 | 1 | 30 | 13 |
| Swindon Town | Total | | 260 | 215 | 19 | 14 | 279 | 229 |
| Career Total | | | 325 | 246 | 24 | 15 | 349 | 261 |

== Honours ==
IFK Göteborg

- Division 2 play-offs: 1939
- Distriktsmästerskapet: 1939–40

Individual

- Football League Third Division South Golden Boot: 1926–27, 1927–28
