= James Kerr (footballer, born 1894) =

Scottish footballer

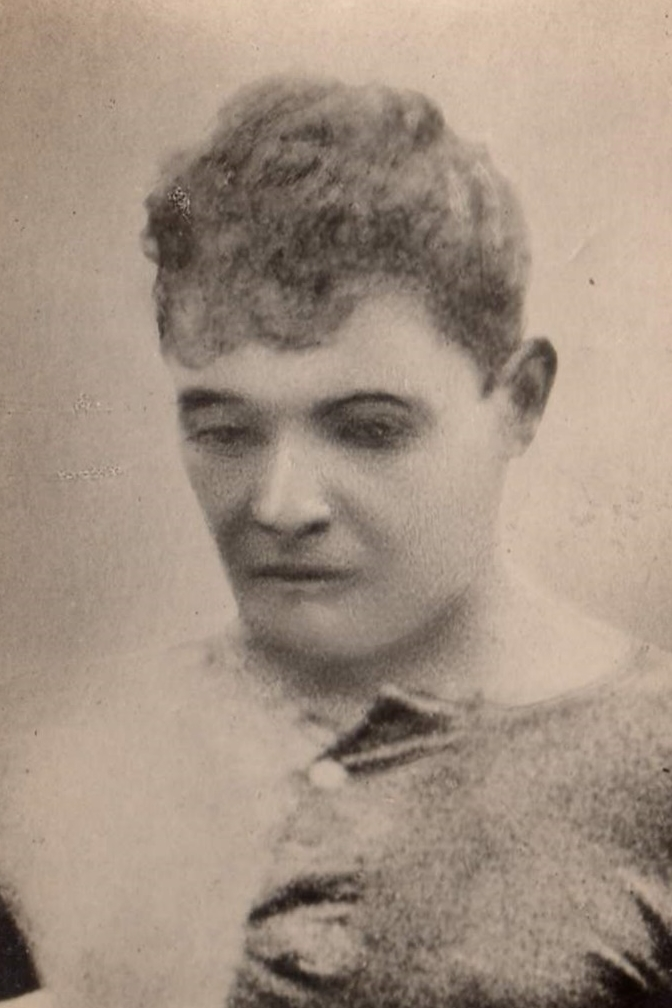
- Kerr while a Blackburn Rovers player.

Personal information
- Full name: John Kerr
- Date of birth: 7 April 1894
- Place of birth: Annan, Scotland
- Date of death: 8 July 1978 (aged 84)
- Place of death: Gretna, Scotland
- Position: Wing half

Senior career*
Years	Team	Apps	(Gls)
- Annan Athletic
1914–1919	Queen's Park	8	(0)
1919–1921	Blackburn Rovers	16	(0)
1921–1924	Brentford	86	(1)
- Solway Star
- * Club domestic league appearances and goals

John Kerr (7 April 1894 – 8 July 1978), sometimes known as James Kerr or Jock Kerr, was a Scottish professional footballer who played as a wing half in the Football League for Brentford and Blackburn Rovers. In 1946, he was one of the founders of Gretna and was a member of the club's committee.

== Personal life ==
While with Queen's Park, Kerr worked as a fitter in the Glasgow shipyards.

== Career statistics ==
Appearances and goals by club, season and competition
Club	Season	League			National cup (Note: Includes Scottish Cup, FA Cup)		Other		Total	
Club	Season	Division	Apps	Goals	Apps	Goals	Apps	Goals	Apps	Goals
Queen's Park	1914–15	Scottish First Division	8	0	—		1 (Note: Appearance in Glasgow Cup)	0	9	0
Blackburn Rovers	1919–20	First Division	15	0	0	0	—		15	0
Blackburn Rovers	1920–21	First Division	1	0	0	0	—		1	0
Blackburn Rovers	Total		16	0	0	0	—		16	0
Brentford	1921–22	Third Division South	21	1	0	0	—		21	1
Brentford	1922–23	Third Division South	42	0	2	0	—		44	0
Brentford	1923–24	Third Division South	23	0	4	0	—		27	0
Brentford	Total		86	1	6	0	—		92	1
Career total			110	1	6	0	1	0	117	1
