= Fretwell Hall =

English footballer

Personal information
- Full name: Fretwell Hall
- Date of birth: 1892
- Place of birth: Ecclesfield, England
- Date of death: October 1937 (aged 45)
- Place of death: Halifax, England
- Height: 5 ft 11 in (1.80 m)
- Position: Wing half

Senior career*
Years	Team	Apps	(Gls)
1913–1915	South Shields		
1915–19??	Goole Town		
1919–1920	Norwich City	30	(?)
1920–1921	Brighton & Hove Albion	12	(0)
1921–1923	Halifax Town	52	(2)
1923–1924	Torquay United		
1924–1925	Peterborough & Fletton United		
- * Club domestic league appearances and goals

Fretwell Hall (1892 – October 1937) was an English professional footballer who played as a wing half in the Football League for Brighton & Hove Albion and Halifax Town.

== Life and career ==
Hall was born in 1892 in Ecclesfield, which was then in the West Riding of Yorkshire. (Note: Joyce lists Hall's birthplace as Wortley; this was the name of the registration district containing Ecclesfield, which census records confirm as his actual place of birth.) He was one of numerous children of Elias Hall, a blacksmith who became a grocer and an official of the West Riding County Council, and his wife, Annie. Three older brothers, Ben, Harry and Ellis, also played in the Football League, and a fourth played Midland League football. The 1911 census records the 18-year-old Hall as living in his father's house in Ecclesfield and working as a coal trammer.

Hall began his football career with South Shields of the North-Eastern League in early 1913. His brother Ellis was already on their books, and Ben Hall was to join later. He remained with the club until February 1915, when he signed for Goole Town of the Midland League. Hall served in the Royal Army Veterinary Corps during the First World War. Afterwards, a trial with Derby County, though promising, came to nothing, and he spent the 1919–20 season with Norwich City, for whom he made 30 appearances in the Southern League.

He signed for Brighton & Hove Albion ahead of their debut season in the Football League as founder members of the newly formed Football League Third Division. His and the club's first appearance in the Football League was on 28 August 1920, a 2–0 defeat away to Southend United in the newly formed Third Division. Competition was fierce for the wing-half position, and Hall made only 11 more first-team appearances in that season.

He moved on to Halifax Town, and again played in his new club's first Football League match: on 27 August 1921, Halifax lost 2–0 at home to Darlington in the new Northern Section of the Third Division. He made 52 league appearances in a two-season stay, playing alongside his brother Ellis in 1922–23. He then returned to the Southern League for two seasons, one with Torquay United and one with Peterborough & Fletton United.

Hall, a married man, lived in Halifax after he retired from the game. He died in the Royal Halifax Infirmary in October 1937 at the age of 45.
