= George Crowther (footballer) =

English footballer

Personal information
- Full name: George Lisle Crowther
- Date of birth: 18 April 1892
- Place of birth: Bishop Middleham, England
- Date of death: 1957 (aged 64–65)
- Place of death: Halifax, England
- Positions: Centre forward; inside left

Senior career*
Years	Team	Apps	(Gls)
1910–1911	Shildon		
1911–1912	Manchester United	0	(0)
1912–1913	Huddersfield Town	2	(0)
1913–1914	Rotherham Town		
1914	Halifax Town		
1914–	Hurst		
1919–1920	Bradford Park Avenue	9	(0)
1920–1921	West Ham United	3	(0)
1921–1922	Hartlepools United	25	(10)
1922–1923	Tranmere Rovers	10	(2)
- * Club domestic league appearances and goals

George Lisle Crowther MM (18 April 1892 – 1957) was an English professional footballer who played as a forward in the Football League for Hartlepools United, Tranmere Rovers, Bradford Park Avenue, West Ham United and Huddersfield Town.

== Personal life ==
Crowther served as a private in the Football Battalion and the Labour Corps during the First World War. He was awarded the Military Medal for his gallantry during the Football Battalion's first major action near Souchez on 1 June 1916.

== Career statistics ==
Appearances and goals by club, season and competition
Club	Season	League			FA Cup		Total	
Club	Season	Division	Apps	Goals	Apps	Goals	Apps	Goals
Huddersfield Town	1912–13	Second Division	2	0	0	0	2	0
West Ham United	1920–21	Second Division	3	0	0	0	3	0
Hartlepools United	1921–22	Third Division North	17	8	0	0	17	8
Hartlepools United	1922–23	Third Division North	8	2	1	0	9	2
Hartlepools United	Total		25	10	1	0	26	10
Career total			30	10	1	0	31	10
