= Billy Holmes (footballer, born 1875) =

English footballer

William Marsden Holmes (1875 – 18 February 1922) was a professional footballer who played as a half back for Manchester City between 1896 and 1904. Holmes made his Manchester City debut in October 1896 in a 4–1 defeat against Notts County. He made 156 league appearances for Manchester City and scored 4 goals. His first goal for the club was scored in the 1897–98 football season in a 2–2 draw against Arsenal. His younger brother Norman was also a footballer.
