= Fred Bullock (footballer) =

English footballer (1886–1922)

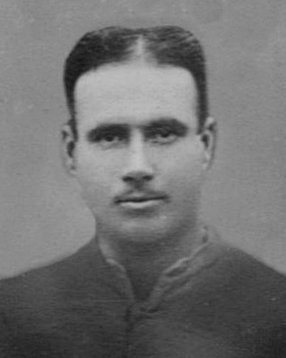
- Bullock while with Huddersfield Town in 1920.

Personal information
- Full name: Frederick Edwin Bullock
- Date of birth: 1 July 1886
- Place of birth: Whitton, England
- Date of death: 14 November 1922 (aged 36)
- Place of death: Huddersfield, England
- Height: 5 ft 7 1/2 in (1.71 m)
- Position: Left back

Senior career*
Years	Team	Apps	(Gls)
1904–1908	Hounslow Town		
1908–1909	Custom House		
1909–1910	Ilford		
1910–1922	Huddersfield Town	202	(1)
1916–1919	→ Brentford (guest)	29	(0)

International career
1910	England Amateurs	1	(0)
1920	England	1	(0)
- * Club domestic league appearances and goals

Frederick Edwin Bullock (1 July 1886 – 14 November 1922) was an English professional footballer, best remembered for his 11-year spell with Huddersfield Town, before, during and after the First World War. He played left back and captained the club.

== International career ==
Bullock won one cap for England, which came in a 2–0 win over Ireland in 1920. He won an amateur cap in 1910.

== Personal life ==
Bullock was married to Maude and had one son. He served as a lance corporal in the Football Battalion during the First World War and was wounded in the right shoulder during the Battle of the Somme in 1916, in the region of Delville Wood and Guillemont. He was injured in the left knee after an accident in 1918 and was demobilised in March 1920. After his retirement from football in 1922, Bullock became landlord of the Slubber's Arms pub in Huddersfield. He died of heart failure due to ammonia poisoning in November 1922 and had been suffering "nerve troubles" during the month preceding his death.

== Career statistics ==
Appearances and goals by club, season and competition
Club	Season	League			FA Cup		Total	
Club	Season	Division	Apps	Goals	Apps	Goals	Apps	Goals
Huddersfield Town	1910–11	Second Division	25	0	0	0	25	0
Huddersfield Town	1911–12	Second Division	28	0	1	0	29	0
Huddersfield Town	1912–13	Second Division	38	1	2	0	40	1
Huddersfield Town	1913–14	Second Division	25	0	0	0	25	0
Huddersfield Town	1914–15	Second Division	28	0	1	0	29	0
Huddersfield Town	1919–20	Second Division	33	0	6	0	39	0
Huddersfield Town	1920–21	First Division	25	0	3	0	28	0
Career Total			202	1	13	0	215	1

== Honours ==
Huddersfield Town

- Football League Second Division second-place promotion: 1919–20
- FA Cup runner-up: 1919–20

Brentford

- London Combination: 1918–19
