= Archie Mitchell (footballer) =

English footballer and manager

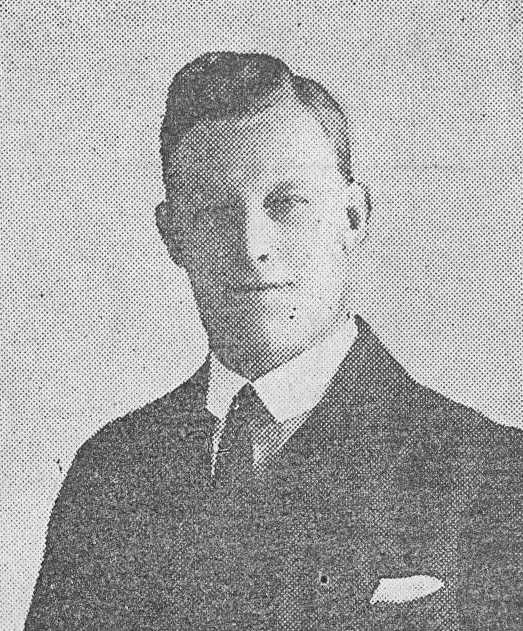
- Mitchell while Brentford manager in 1924.

Personal information
- Full name: Archibald Philip Mitchell
- Date of birth: 15 December 1885
- Place of birth: Smethwick, England
- Date of death: 16 April 1949 (aged 63)
- Place of death: Richmond Hill, Ontario, Canada
- Position: Centre half

Senior career*
Years	Team	Apps	(Gls)
–1905	Oldbury St John's		
1905–1907	Aston Villa	0	(0)
1907–1921	Queens Park Rangers	306	(11)
1916	→ Brentford (guest)	1	(0)
1921–1922	Brentford	13	(2)
Total		48	(5)

International career
	England Juniors	1	
	Southern League XI	7	
1921	Football League XI	1	(0)

Managerial career
- 1921–1924: Brentford
- Dartford
- 1931–1933: Queens Park Rangers
- * Club domestic league appearances and goals

Archibald Philip Mitchell (15 December 1885 – 16 April 1949) was an English professional footballer and manager. He is best remembered for his long spell as a centre half with Queens Park Rangers, for whom he made over 300 appearances and later managed. Mitchell began his professional career with Aston Villa.

== Club career ==
=== Early years and Aston Villa ===
A centre half, Mitchell began his playing career with amateur side Oldbury St John's, before transferring to First Division club Aston Villa in 1905. He failed to make a first team appearance for the club, appearing instead for the reserve team. With the reserves, he helped the team win the Birmingham & District League title in the 1905–06 and 1906–07 seasons. Mitchell departed Villa in 1907.

=== Queens Park Rangers ===
On 2 May 1907, Mitchell joined Southern League First Division club Queens Park Rangers. He had a good start to his career with the Hoops, winning the 1907–08 First Division title in his debut season. A further First Division title was won in 1911–12, with the Charity Shield being lost 2–1 to Football League First Division champions Blackburn Rovers. He remained with Queens Park Rangers through to 1921 and finally made his Football League debut at the age of 34 in the 1920–21 season, after the club were elected to the Football League Third Division. He made 35 appearances and scored three goals during the 1920–21 season. By the time he left the Hoops at the end of the campaign, Mitchell had made over 330 appearances for the club, excluding unofficial wartime competitions.

=== Brentford ===
Mitchell joined Third Division South West London rivals Brentford as player in August 1921, after having previously made an appearance for the club as a guest during the First World War. He made 16 appearances and scored two goals for the Bees, with the final appearance of his career coming as a goalkeeper in the final away league game of the 1921–22 season away to Swansea Town.

== Management career ==
=== Brentford ===
When Mitchell joined Third Division South club Brentford in August 1921, he became the club's player-manager. He presided over three forgettable campaigns, with his best finish being 9th in the 1921–22 season. After a run of seven straight defeats, Mitchell left the club in December 1924.

=== Queens Park Rangers ===
After coaching in the Balkans and a two-year stint as manager of Southern League club Dartford, Mitchell returned to former club Queens Park Rangers as manager in November 1931, replacing John Bowman, who had to step down due to ill-health. He led the club to a mid-table finish in what remained of the 1931–32 Third Division South season and resigned at the end of the 1932–33 season.

== International and representative career ==
Mitchell made one appearance for England Juniors and made seven appearances for the Southern League representative team while with Queens Park Rangers. He made an appearance for the Football League XI in a 4–1 win over the Army on 10 November 1921.

== Personal life ==
After leaving Brentford and before departing for the Balkans, Mitchell worked in Acton as a schoolteacher.

== Career statistics ==
=== Player ===
Appearances and goals by club, season and competition
Club	Season	League			FA Cup		Other		Total	
Club	Season	Division	Apps	Goals	Apps	Goals	Apps	Goals	Apps	Goals
Queens Park Rangers	1907–08	Southern League First Division	12	0	0	0	—		12	0
Queens Park Rangers	1908–09	Southern League First Division	23	0	1	0	—		24	0
Queens Park Rangers	1909–10	Southern League First Division	30	1	7	0	—		37	1
Queens Park Rangers	1910–11	Southern League First Division	33	0	1	0	—		34	0
Queens Park Rangers	1911–12	Southern League First Division	37	2	2	0	1 (Note: Appearance in FA Charity Shield)	0	40	2
Queens Park Rangers	1912–13	Southern League First Division	38	1	2	0	—		40	1
Queens Park Rangers	1913–14	Southern League First Division	33	1	5	1	—		38	2
Queens Park Rangers	1914–15	Southern League First Division	30	1	3	0	—		33	1
Queens Park Rangers	1919–20	Southern League First Division	35	2	1	0	—		36	0
Queens Park Rangers	1920–21	Third Division	35	3	2	0	—		37	0
Queens Park Rangers	Total		306	11	24	1	1	0	331	12
Brentford	1921–22	Third Division South	13	2	3	1	—		16	3
Career total			319	13	27	2	1	0	347	15

=== Manager ===
Team	From	To	Record					Ref
Team	From	To	G	W	D	L	Win %	Ref
Brentford	August 1921	December 1924	155	51	35	69	32.90	
Queens Park Rangers	November 1931	May 1933	79	32	18	29	40.51	
Total			234	83	53	98	35.47	—

== Honours ==
Aston Villa Reserves

- Birmingham & District League (2): 1905–06, 1906–07

Queens Park Rangers

- Southern League First Division (2): 1907–08, 1911–12
