= Thomas Elliott (footballer) =

English footballer

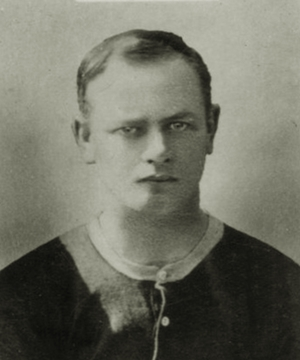
- Elliott while with Brentford in 1921.

Personal information
- Full name: Thomas William Elliott
- Date of birth: 6 April 1890
- Place of birth: Annfield Plain, England
- Date of death: 4 May 1955 (aged 65)
- Place of death: Ryton, England
- Height: 5 ft 7 in (1.70 m)
- Positions: Inside right; centre forward

Senior career*
Years	Team	Apps	(Gls)
- Annfield Plain
1906–1907	Felling Equal Rights		
1908	Wallsend Park Villa		
1908–1909	Pelaw		
1909	West Stanley		
1909	Felling Equal Rights		
1910	Gainsborough Trinity	9	(0)
1910–1912	West Stanley		
1912–1919	Huddersfield Town	72	(18)
1919	Grimsby Town	0	(0)
1920–1921	Nottingham Forest	28	(7)
1921–1923	Brentford	49	(8)
1923–1924	Durham City	27	(13)
1924	Crewe Alexandra	16	(4)
- Annfield Plain
- Crawcrook Albion
- Newcastle Tramways
Total		203	(50)
- * Club domestic league appearances and goals

Thomas William Elliott (6 April 1890 – 4 May 1955) was an English professional footballer who made over 200 appearances as a forward in the Football League for Huddersfield Town, Brentford, Nottingham Forest, Durham City, Crewe Alexandra and Gainsborough Trinity. Either side of his League career, he played in non-League football.

== Personal life ==
Elliott was deaf.

== Career statistics ==
Appearances and goals by club, season and competition
Club	Season	League			FA Cup		Total	
Club	Season	Division	Apps	Goals	Apps	Goals	Apps	Goals
Huddersfield Town	1912–13	Second Division	34	9	1	2	35	11
Huddersfield Town	1913–14	Second Division	27	9	2	0	29	9
Huddersfield Town	1914–15	Second Division	10	0	0	0	10	0
Huddersfield Town	1919–20	Second Division	1	0	0	0	1	0
Huddersfield Town	Total		72	18	3	2	75	20
Nottingham Forest	1920–21	First Division	28	7	0	0	28	7
Brentford	1921–22	Third Division South	39	8	3	1	42	9
Brentford	1922–23	Third Division South	10	0	3	0	13	0
Brentford	Total		49	8	6	1	55	9
Career total			149	33	9	3	158	36
