= William Young (footballer, born 1892) =

English footballer (1892–1965)

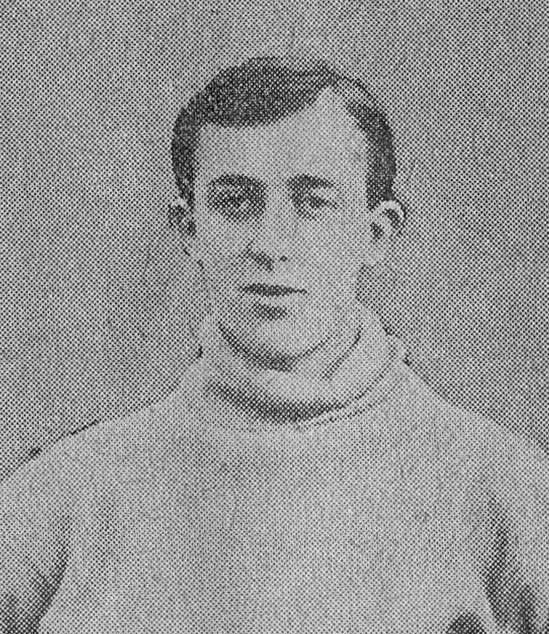
- Young while with Brentford in 1920.

Personal information
- Full name: William Preston Young
- Date of birth: 4 August 1892
- Place of birth: Whitburn, England
- Date of death: 5 June 1965 (aged 72)
- Place of death: South Shields, England
- Position: Goalkeeper

Senior career*
Years	Team	Apps	(Gls)
1919–	Whitburn		
–1920	South Shields		
1920–1925	Brentford	169	(0)
- * Club domestic league appearances and goals

William Preston Young (4 August 1892 – 5 June 1965) was an English professional footballer who played as a goalkeeper in the Football League for Brentford. He was the first player to make 100 Football League appearances for Brentford.

== Career ==
A goalkeeper, Young began his career with spells at Whitburn and South Shields. Young transferred to Brentford in 1920 and played in the club's first ever Football League match on 28 August 1920, which ended in a 3–0 defeat to fellow Third Division newcomers Exeter City. Young battled for the goalkeeper's jersey with cricketer Jack Durston, but eventually made the position his own and made 94 consecutive appearances between September 1922 and October 1924. He left the club at the end of the 1924–25 season, after making 180 appearances for Brentford. Young was the club's record Football League appearance-maker until his total was overtaken by Jack Lane.

== Career statistics ==
Appearances and goals by club, season and competition
Club	Season	League			FA Cup		Total	
Club	Season	Division	Apps	Goals	Apps	Goals	Apps	Goals
Brentford	1920–21	Third Division	18	0	1	0	19	0
Brentford	1921–22	Third Division South	41	0	3	0	44	0
Brentford	1922–23	Third Division South	36	0	3	0	39	0
Brentford	1923–24	Third Division South	42	0	4	0	46	0
Brentford	1924–25	Third Division South	32	0	0	0	32	0
Career total			169	0	11	0	180	0
