= James Campbell (English footballer) =

English footballer

Personal information
- Full name: James Campbell
- Place of birth: London, England
- Position: Goalkeeper

Senior career*
Years	Team	Apps	(Gls)
- Custom House
1910–1911	Huddersfield Town	1	(0)
- * Club domestic league appearances and goals

James Campbell was an English professional footballer who made one appearance in the Football League as a goalkeeper while on trial with Huddersfield Town.

== Career statistics ==
Appearances and goals by club, season and competition
Club	Season	League			FA Cup		Total	
Club	Season	Division	Apps	Goals	Apps	Goals	Apps	Goals
Huddersfield Town	1910–11	Second Division	1	0	0	0	1	0
Career total			1	0	0	0	1	0
