= Fred Howe (footballer, born 1895) =

English footballer

Personal information
- Full name: Frederick Howe
- Date of birth: 1895
- Place of birth: Rotherham, England
- Position: Wing half

Youth career
- Kimberworth Old Boys

Senior career*
Years	Team	Apps	(Gls)
1919–1920	Coventry City	5	(0)
1920	Kimberworth Old Boys		
1920–1922	Brentford	3	(0)
- Peterborough & Fletton United
- Wellingborough Town
- Peterborough & Fletton United
- * Club domestic league appearances and goals

Frederick Howe was an English professional footballer who played as a wing half in the Football League for Coventry City and Brentford.

== Career statistics ==
Appearances and goals by club, season and competition
Club	Season	League			FA Cup		Total	
Club	Season	Division	Apps	Goals	Apps	Goals	Apps	Goals
Coventry City	1919–20	Second Division	5	0	0	0	5	0
Brentford	1920–21	Third Division	2	0	—		2	0
Brentford	1921–22	Third Division South	1	0	0	0	1	0
Brentford	Total		3	0	0	0	3	0
Career total			8	0	0	0	8	0
