= Charles Fisher (footballer) =

English footballer

Personal information
- Date of birth: 9 June 1899
- Place of birth: Handsworth, England
- Date of death: January 1985 (aged 85)
- Place of death: Birmingham, England
- Position: Wing half

Youth career
- Kimberworth Old Boys
- 1914-1915: Aston Villa

Senior career*
Years	Team	Apps	(Gls)
1919–1921	Aston Villa	0	(0)
- Kidderminster Harriers
1921–1922	Brentford	6	(0)
- Margate

International career
- England Juniors
- * Club domestic league appearances and goals

Charles Fisher was an English professional football wing half who played in the Football League for Brentford.

== Career statistics ==
Appearances and goals by club, season and competition
Club	Season	League			FA Cup		Total	
Club	Season	Division	Apps	Goals	Apps	Goals	Apps	Goals
Brentford	1921–22	Third Division South	6	0	0	0	6	0
Career total			6	0	0	0	6	0
