= Andy Armour =

Scottish footballer

Personal information
- Full name: Andrew D. Armour
- Date of birth: 24 July 1883
- Place of birth: Irvine, Scotland
- Date of death: 4 March 1955 (aged 71)
- Place of death: Kilmarnock, Scotland
- Height: 5 ft 7 in (1.70 m)
- Position: Outside right

Senior career*
| Years | Team | Apps | (Gls) |
| –1905 | Irvine Meadow XI | | |
| 1905–1907 | Queen's Park | 51 | (13) |
| 1907–1910 | Kilmarnock | 71 | (12) |
| 1910 | Queen's Park | 5 | (2) |
| 1910–1911 | Kilmarnock | 42 | (1) |
| 1911–1914 | Huddersfield Town | 93 | (7) |
| 1914–1920 | Kilmarnock | 41 | (7) |
| 1916–1917 | → Clydebank (loan) | 0 | (0) |

International career
| 1909 | Scottish League XI | 1 | (0) |
- * Club domestic league appearances and goals

Andrew D. Armour (24 July 1883 – 4 March 1955) was a Scottish professional footballer who played in the Scottish League for Kilmarnock and Queen's Park as an outside right. He also played in the Football League for Huddersfield Town and represented the Scottish League XI.

== Personal life ==
Armour served as an acting sergeant in the Army Service Corps during the First World War.

== Career statistics ==
Appearances and goals by club, season and competition
| Club | Season | League | | | National Cup | | Other | | Total | |
| Club | Season | Division | Apps | Goals | Apps | Goals | Apps | Goals | Apps | Goals |
|---|---|---|---|---|---|---|---|---|---|---|
| Queen's Park | 1905–06 | Scottish Division One | 22 | 2 | 2 | 0 | 2 (Note: 1 appearance in Glasgow Cup, 1 appearance in Glasgow Merchants Charity Cup) | 0 | 26 | 2 |
| Queen's Park | 1906–07 | Scottish Division One | 26 | 11 | 5 | 0 | 2 (Note: Appearances in Glasgow Cup) | 0 | 33 | 11 |
| Queen's Park | 1907–08 | Scottish Division One | 3 | 0 | ― | | ― | | 3 | 0 |
| Queen's Park | Total | | 51 | 13 | 7 | 0 | 4 | 0 | 62 | 13 |
| Kilmarnock | 1907–08 | Scottish Division One | 17 | 4 | 3 | 0 | ― | | 20 | 4 |
| Kilmarnock | 1908–09 | Scottish Division One | 30 | 4 | 1 | 0 | ― | | 31 | 4 |
| Kilmarnock | 1909–10 | Scottish Division One | 24 | 4 | 2 | 0 | ― | | 26 | 4 |
| Kilmarnock | Total | | 71 | 12 | 6 | 0 | ― | | 77 | 12 |
| Queen's Park | 1909–10 | Scottish First Division | 5 | 2 | ― | | 1 (Note: Appearance in Glasgow Merchants Charity Cup) | 0 | 6 | 2 |
| Queen's Park | Total | | 56 | 15 | 7 | 0 | 5 | 0 | 68 | 15 |
| Kilmarnock | 1910–11 | Scottish Division One | 29 | 0 | 1 | 1 | ― | | 30 | 1 |
| Kilmarnock | 1911–12 | Scottish Division One | 13 | 1 | ― | | ― | | 13 | 1 |
| Kilmarnock | Total | | 42 | 1 | 1 | 1 | ― | | 43 | 2 |
| Huddersfield Town | 1911–12 | Second Division | 19 | 2 | 1 | 0 | ― | | 20 | 2 |
| Huddersfield Town | 1912–13 | Second Division | 36 | 2 | 2 | 0 | ― | | 38 | 2 |
| Huddersfield Town | 1913–14 | Second Division | 38 | 3 | 2 | 1 | ― | | 40 | 4 |
| Huddersfield Town | Total | | 93 | 7 | 5 | 1 | ― | | 98 | 8 |
| Kilmarnock | 1914–15 | Scottish Division One | 27 | 5 | ― | | ― | | 27 | 5 |
| Kilmarnock | 1915–16 | Scottish Division One | 14 | 2 | ― | | ― | | 14 | 2 |
| Kilmarnock | Total | | 154 | 20 | 7 | 1 | ― | | 161 | 21 |
| Career total | | | 303 | 42 | 19 | 2 | 5 | 0 | 327 | 44 |
