= Ellis Hall (footballer) =

English footballer (1889–1949)

Personal information
- Full name: Ellis Hall
- Date of birth: 22 June 1889
- Place of birth: Ecclesfield, Sheffield, England
- Date of death: 1949 (aged 60)
- Place of death: Loughborough, England
- Height: 5 ft 10 in (1.78 m)
- Positions: Defender; right half

Senior career*
Years	Team	Apps	(Gls)
1905–1907	Hull City	8	(0)
1907–1908	Millwall Athletic		
1908–1909	Hastings & St. Leonards		
1909–1910	Stoke	39	(4)
1910–1912	Huddersfield Town	39	(2)
1912–1919	South Shields		
1919–1922	Hamilton Academical	118	(3)
1922–1925	Halifax Town	115	(2)
- * Club domestic league appearances and goals

Ellis Hall (22 June 1889 – 1949) was an English footballer who played for Hull City, Stoke, Huddersfield Town, Hamilton Academical and Halifax Town.

== Career ==
Hall was born in Ecclesfield, Sheffield and began his career with Hull City making eight appearances in two years he left for Millwall Athletic and Hastings & St. Leonards United before joining Stoke in 1909. He played 45 times for the "Potters" in 1909–10 scoring four goals and left at the end of the season for Huddersfield Town. His career was interrupted by the outbreak of World War I during which time he also made guest appearances for a number of clubs including Sheffield United, Derby County and Grimsby Town. After the war Ellis went on to play for South Shields, Hamilton Academical and Halifax Town.

Three of his brothers, Ben, Harry and Fretwell, also played in the Football League.

== Career statistics ==
Appearances and goals by club, season and competition
Club	Season	League			FA Cup		Total	
Club	Season	Division	Apps	Goals	Apps	Goals	Apps	Goals
Hull City	1905–06	Second Division	3	0	0	0	3	0
Hull City	1906–07	Second Division	5	0	0	0	5	0
Stoke	1909–10	Birmingham & District League / Southern League Division Two	39	4	6	0	45	4
Huddersfield Town	1910–11	Second Division	24	1	1	0	25	1
Huddersfield Town	1911–12	Second Division	15	1	0	0	15	1
Halifax Town	1922–23	Third Division North	38	1	5	0	43	1
Halifax Town	1923–24	Third Division North	40	0	8	1	48	1
Halifax Town	1924–25	Third Division North	37	1	1	0	38	1
Career total			201	8	21	1	222	9
