= George Bertram (footballer, born 1896) =

English footballer

Personal information
- Full name: George Bertram
- Date of birth: 15 January 1896
- Place of birth: Brandon, England
- Date of death: 6 April 1963 (aged 67)
- Place of death: Uxbridge, England
- Positions: Forward; half back

Senior career*
Years	Team	Apps	(Gls)
–1919	Durham City		
1919–1921	Fulham	15	(2)
1921–1922	Brentford	10	(2)
- Sittingbourne
1924	Rotherham County	1	(0)
- Leadgate Park
- Whitchurch
- Oswestry Town
- Wrexham
- Whitchurch
- Fitzgerald's Athletic
- * Club domestic league appearances and goals

George Bertram (15 January 1896 – 6 April 1963) was an English professional footballer who played in the Football League for Fulham, Brentford and Rotherham County as a forward or half back.

== Career statistics ==
Appearances and goals by club, season and competition
Club	Season	League			FA Cup		Total	
Club	Season	Division	Apps	Goals	Apps	Goals	Apps	Goals
Fulham	1919–20	Second Division	12	2	0	0	12	2
Fulham	1920–21	Second Division	3	0	0	0	3	0
Fulham	Total		15	2	0	0	15	2
Brentford	1921–22	Third Division South	10	2	0	0	10	2
Career total			25	4	0	0	25	4
