= George Pither =

English footballer

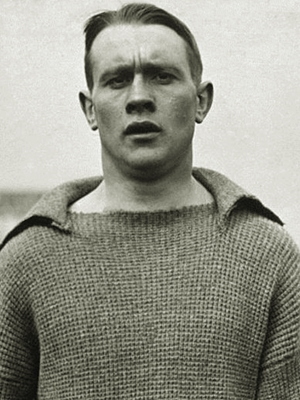
- Pither while with Millwall Athletic in 1921.

Personal information
- Full name: George Pither
- Date of birth: 24 June 1899
- Place of birth: Kew, England
- Date of death: 3 January 1966 (aged 66)
- Place of death: Tonbridge, England
- Height: 5 ft 8 1/2 in (1.74 m)
- Position: Outside left

Senior career*
| Years | Team | Apps | (Gls) |
| 1919–1920 | Richmond Wednesday | | |
| 1920–1921 | Isleworth Town | | |
| 1921–1922 | Brentford | 7 | (0) |
| 1922–1924 | Millwall | 19 | (0) |
| 1924–1925 | Bristol Rovers | 2 | (0) |
| 1925–1926 | Torquay United | | |
| 1926 | Merthyr Town | 16 | (5) |
| 1926–1928 | Liverpool | 12 | (1) |
| 1928–1929 | Crewe Alexandra | 38 | (11) |
| 1929–1930 | New Brighton | 79 | (10) |
| 1931–1932 | Tunbridge Wells Rangers | | |
| 1932–1933 | Margate | | |
| 1933 | Chatham Town | | |
- * Club domestic league appearances and goals

George Pither (24 June 1899 – 3 January 1966) was an English professional footballer who played as an outside forward in the Football League, most notably for New Brighton and Crewe Alexandra.

== Career statistics ==
Appearances and goals by club, season and competition
| Club | Season | League | | | FA Cup | | Total | |
| Club | Season | Division | Apps | Goals | Apps | Goals | Apps | Goals |
|---|---|---|---|---|---|---|---|---|
| Brentford | 1921–22 | Third Division South | 7 | 0 | 0 | 0 | 7 | 0 |
| Millwall | 1922–23 | Third Division South | 11 | 0 | 1 | 0 | 12 | 0 |
| Millwall | 1923–24 | Third Division South | 8 | 0 | 0 | 0 | 8 | 0 |
| Millwall | Total | | 19 | 0 | 1 | 0 | 20 | 0 |
| Bristol Rovers | 1924–25 | Third Division South | 2 | 0 | 0 | 0 | 2 | 0 |
| Liverpool | 1926–27 | First Division | 6 | 0 | 0 | 0 | 6 | 0 |
| Liverpool | 1927–28 | First Division | 6 | 1 | 0 | 0 | 6 | 1 |
| Liverpool | Total | | 12 | 1 | 0 | 0 | 12 | 1 |
| Career total | | | 40 | 1 | 1 | 0 | 41 | 1 |
