= Ben Hall (footballer, born 1879) =

English footballer, manager, and trainer

Personal information
- Full name: Benjamin Hall
- Date of birth: 6 March 1879
- Place of birth: Ecclesfield, Sheffield, England
- Date of death: 1963 (aged 84)
- Position: Centre half

Senior career*
Years	Team	Apps	(Gls)
1900–1903	Grimsby Town	39	(4)
1903–1911	Derby County	245	(11)
1911–1912	Leicester Fosse	14	(0)
- Hyde
- Heywood United
- South Shields

Managerial career
- 1920–1921: Bristol Rovers
- * Club domestic league appearances and goals

Benjamin Hall (6 March 1879 – 1963) was an English football player, manager and trainer, who played as a centre half.

Hall's playing career saw him represent Grimsby Town, Derby County, Leicester Fosse, Hyde, Heywood United and South Shields before the First World War. After the war he worked as a trainer for Huddersfield Town before being appointed as Bristol Rovers' first Football League manager in 1920.

Three of his brothers, Harry, Ellis and Fretwell, also played in the Football League.
