= Harry Linley =

English footballer

Personal information
- Place of birth: Sheffield, England
- Height: 5 ft 11 in (1.80 m)
- Position: Defender

Senior career*
Years	Team	Apps	(Gls)
1913–1921	Huddersfield Town	48	(1)
- Halifax Town
- * Club domestic league appearances and goals

Harry Linley (born in Sheffield) was a professional footballer who played for Huddersfield Town and Halifax Town.
