= Norman Holmes (footballer) =

Footballer

Personal information
- Full name: Norman Arnold Holmes
- Date of birth: 21 September 1890
- Place of birth: Darley Hillside, England
- Date of death: July 1965 (aged 74)
- Place of death: Liverpool, England
- Height: 5 ft 11 1/4 in (1.81 m)
- Position: Right-back

Senior career*
Years	Team	Apps	(Gls)
1909	Leeds City	0	(0)
1910–1913	Clapton Orient	4	(0)
1913–1914	Huddersfield Town	3	(0)
1914–1918	York City		
- * Club domestic league appearances and goals

Norman Arnold Holmes (21 September 1890 – July 1965) was an English professional footballer who played as a right-back in the Football League for Clapton Orient and Huddersfield Town.

== Personal life ==
Holmes was the younger brother of footballer and manager Billy Holmes. He served in the Middlesex Regiment during the First World War and rose to the rank of lance corporal in the 1st Football Battalion, before being commissioned into the 21st (Service) Battalion as a second lieutenant in June 1918. Holmes' football career was ended by wounds received during the course of his service.

== Career statistics ==
Appearances and goals by club, season and competition
Club	Season	League			FA Cup		Total	
Club	Season	Division	Apps	Goals	Apps	Goals	Apps	Goals
Huddersfield Town	1913–14	Second Division	3	0	0	0	3	0
Career Total			3	0	0	0	3	0
