= Thomas Felstead =

English footballer

Personal information
- Full name: Thomas Felstead
- Date of birth: 26 May 1887
- Date of death: 1956 (aged 68–69)
- Position: Goalkeeper

Senior career*
Years	Team	Apps	(Gls)
1909–1911	Huddersfield Town	2	(0)
- * Club domestic league appearances and goals

Thomas Felstead (1887–1956) was a professional footballer, who played for Huddersfield Town.
