= Jack Cameron (footballer, died 1916) =

Scottish footballer

Personal information
- Full name: John Cameron
- Place of birth: Dornoch, Scotland
- Position: Striker

Senior career*
Years	Team	Apps	(Gls)
1911–1912	Huddersfield Town	2	(1)
- * Club domestic league appearances and goals

John Cameron was a Scottish professional footballer, who played for Huddersfield Town. He was killed in action, serving with the Queen's Own Cameron Highlanders, in the First World War sometime during 1916.
