= Robert Duxbury =

English footballer

Personal information
- Full name: Robert Shorrock Duxbury
- Date of birth: 1 January 1890
- Place of birth: Darwen, Lancs., England
- Date of death: 18 April 1962 (aged 72)
- Place of death: Darwen, Lancs., England
- Position: Defender

Senior career*
Years	Team	Apps	(Gls)
1910–1911	Huddersfield Town	6	(0)
- * Club domestic league appearances and goals

Robert Shorrock Duxbury (1 January 1890 – 18 April 1962) was an English professional footballer who played for Huddersfield Town.

Druxbury was born in Darwen on New Year's Day 1890 to Robert Shorrock Duxbury Sr., a mill engine tenter, and Margaret Ann Storer. He died in Darwen in 1962.
