= Gordon Burniston =

English footballer

Personal information
- Full name: Gordon Edmondson Burniston
- Date of birth: 1885
- Place of birth: Harrogate, England
- Date of death: 1934
- Place of death: Yorkshire, England
- Position: Midfielder

Senior career*
Years	Team	Apps	(Gls)
1910–1911	Huddersfield Town	3	(1)
- Merthyr Town
- * Club domestic league appearances and goals

Gordon Edmondson Burniston (1885 – 1934) was a professional footballer, who played for Huddersfield Town, and Merthyr Town.
