= Ralph Shields =

English footballer

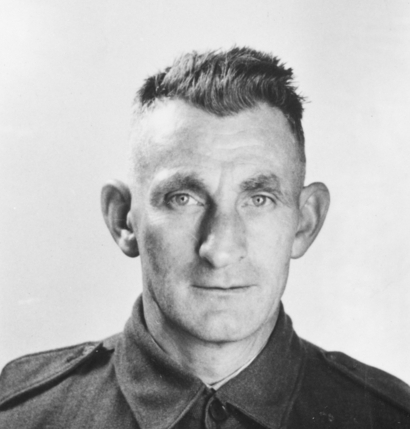
- Shields in 1940.

Personal information
- Full name: Ralph Shields
- Date of birth: 18 February 1892
- Place of birth: Easington, England
- Date of death: 21 November 1944 (aged 52)
- Place of death: Sandakan, Borneo
- Position: Forward

Senior career*
Years	Team	Apps	(Gls)
–1913	Newbiggin Athletic		
1913–1914	Choppington Alliance		
1913–1914	Newcastle United	0	(0)
1914–1920	Huddersfield Town	45	(21)
1920–1921	Exeter City	19	(4)
1921–1922	Brentford	8	(1)
1922–1926	Sittingbourne		
1926–1927	Blyth Spartans		
- * Club domestic league appearances and goals

Ralph Shields (18 February 1892 – 21 November 1944) was an English professional footballer who played as a forward in the Football League for Huddersfield Town, Exeter City and Brentford.

== Career ==
As a young man, Shields was a miner, but played football for his local junior club Newbiggin Athletic in the Wansbeck League. In 1913, he was playing for Choppington Alliance when he was spotted by Newcastle United and was transferred to the club for a fee of £40 on 30 October 1913. Shields did not make a senior appearance for Newcastle United and in May 1914, Second Division club Huddersfield Town paid a £100 fee for his signature. The following season, 1914–15, Shields was Huddersfield Town's leading goal scorer, with 16 goals in 29 appearances.

The season after World War I, 1919–20, he was part of the Huddersfield Town team which gained promotion from the Second Division to the First Division, making 13 appearances and scoring 3 goals. In December 1920, Shields was transferred to Third Division club Exeter City in a part-exchange deal for £2,000, plus William Wright. During the remainder of the 1920–21 season, he scored 4 goals in 19 appearances. In August 1921, he was transferred to Third Division South club Brentford and made 9 appearances during the 1921–22 season, scoring one goal. This was his last season in the Football League. Shields played for Sittingbourne in the Kent League for a number of seasons, before moving back to the North East to play for Blyth Spartans in the North Eastern League.

== Personal life ==
As with many footballers during World War I, Shields signed up to serve and did so as a bombardier in the Royal Field Artillery. In October 1927, Shields and his family emigrated to Australia to build a new life in Concord, New South Wales. On 30 June 1940, 9 months after the outbreak of World War II, he attested in the Australian Army in Paddington and gave a false birth date of 11 September 1900, which produced an age just shy of the limit of 40. In 1942, while serving with the Australian Army Service Corps in Malaya, Shields was captured by the Imperial Japanese Army and interned as a POW in Sandakan Prisoner of War Camp, North Borneo. He died of malnutrition and beriberi on 21 November 1944 and was buried at the Labuan War Cemetery in Malaysia.

== Career statistics ==
Appearances and goals by club, season and competition
Club	Season	League			FA Cup		Total	
Club	Season	Division	Apps	Goals	Apps	Goals	Apps	Goals
Huddersfield Town	1914–15	Second Division	28	16	1	0	29	16
Huddersfield Town	1919–20	Second Division	13	3	1	1	14	4
Huddersfield Town	1920–21	First Division	4	2	—		4	2
Huddersfield Town	Total		45	21	2	1	47	22
Exeter City	1920–21	Third Division	19	4	—		19	4
Brentford	1921–22	Third Division South	8	1	1	0	9	1
Career total			72	26	3	1	75	27

== Honours ==
Huddersfield Town

- Football League Second Division second-place promotion: 1919–20
