= William Martin (English footballer) =

English footballer

Personal information
- Place of birth: London, England
- Position: Defender

Senior career*
| Years | Team | Apps | (Gls) |
| 1911–1912 | Huddersfield Town | 5 | (0) |
- * Club domestic league appearances and goals

William W. Martin (born in London) was an English professional footballer, who played for Huddersfield Town.

== Sources ==
- Ian Thomas, Owen Thomas, Alan Hodgson, John Ward (2007). 99 Years and Counting: Stats and Stories. Huddersfield Town A.F.C. ISBN 978-0955728105.
