= Harold Hall (footballer) =

English footballer

Harry Hall
Personal information
- Full name: Harold Hall
- Date of birth: 1887
- Place of birth: Ecclesfield, Sheffield, England
- Positions: Inside right; outside right

Senior career*
| Years | Team | Apps | (Gls) |
| 1905–1907 | Hull City | 2 | (0) |
- Rotherham Town
| 1910–1911 | Huddersfield Town | 20 | (0) |
| 1911–1912 | Grimsby Town | 0 | (0) |
- * Club domestic league appearances and goals

Harold Hall (1887 – after 1911), also known as Harry Hall, was an English professional footballer who played for Rotherham Town, Huddersfield Town and Grimsby Town.

Three of his brothers, Ben, Ellis and Fretwell, also played in the Football League.
