= 1919–20 Bradford City A.F.C. season =

English football club season

The 1919–20 Bradford City A.F.C. season was the 13th in the club's history.

This was the first season after World War I, football having been suspended during the war.

The club finished 15th in Division One, and reached the 4th round of the FA Cup. The exit in the 4th round to Bristol City was a "shock" and was blamed on the players visiting a chocolate factory before the match.

Pos	Team	Pld	W	D	L	GF	GA	GAv	Pts
13	Middlesbrough	42	15	10	17	61	65	0.938	40
14	Sheffield United	42	16	8	18	59	69	0.855	40
15	Bradford City	42	14	11	17	54	63	0.857	39
16	Everton	42	12	14	16	69	68	1.015	38
17	Oldham Athletic	42	15	8	19	49	52	0.942	38

Source: World Football
Rules for classification: 1) Points; 2) Goal average; 3) Goals scored

== Sources ==
- Frost, Terry (1988). Bradford City A Complete Record 1903-1988. Breedon Books Sport. ISBN 0-907969-38-0.
