= Horace Husler =

English footballer

Personal information
- Full name: Horace Henry Husler
- Date of birth: 1890
- Place of birth: Sheffield, England
- Date of death: 1959 (aged 68–69)
- Place of death: West Riding of Yorkshire, England
- Height: 6 ft 2 in (1.88 m)
- Position: Goalkeeper

Senior career*
Years	Team	Apps	(Gls)
	The Wednesday	?	(?)
1912–1913	Huddersfield Town	1	(0)
1914−1915	Doncaster Rovers	?	(0)
- * Club domestic league appearances and goals

Horace Henry Husler (1890−1959), born and brought up in Sheffield, was a professional footballer who played as a goalkeeper for The Wednesday, Huddersfield Town and Doncaster Rovers.

During his time at Doncaster he had not been fully paid. The FA intervened on his behalf, resulting in the suspension of the club through most of December 1915 when the two parties settled their differences.
