= Larrett Roebuck =

English footballer

Personal information
- Full name: Larrett Roebuck
- Date of birth: 27 January 1889
- Place of birth: Jump, England
- Date of death: 18 October 1914 (aged 25)
- Place of death: near Beaucamps-Ligny, France
- Height: 5 ft 7 in (1.70 m)
- Position: Left back

Senior career*
Years	Team	Apps	(Gls)
–1913	Silverwood Colliery		
1913–1914	Huddersfield Town	17	(0)
- * Club domestic league appearances and goals

Larrett Roebuck (27 January 1889 – 18 October 1914) was an English professional footballer who played in the Football League for Huddersfield Town as a left back. He was the first Football League player to be killed in the First World War.

== Personal life ==
As a boy, Roebuck worked as a trammer at Silverwood Colliery and after being sentenced to one month's imprisonment for stealing a watch in 1904, he enlisted in the territorial section of the York and Lancaster Regiment. Over the next seven years, he was stationed in India and Ireland and was promoted to lance corporal, but was demoted back to private in 1910 for "misconduct". He married in 1908 and had four children. Roebuck was discharged into the reserves in 1912 and likely returned to work as a miner prior to becoming a professional footballer in 1913. After Britain's entry into the First World War in August 1914, he was mobilised by the York and Lancaster Regiment and arrived on the Western Front in September 1914. On 18 October 1914, Roebuck was recorded as "presumed dead" after an attack near Beaucamps-Ligny during the Race to the Sea. His death was confirmed by two comrades in January 1915. Roebuck is commemorated on the Ploegsteert Memorial to the Missing.

== Career statistics ==
Appearances and goals by club, season and competition
Club	Season	League			FA Cup		Total	
Club	Season	Division	Apps	Goals	Apps	Goals	Apps	Goals
Huddersfield Town	1913–14	Second Division	17	0	2	0	19	0
Career total			17	0	2	0	19	0

== See also ==
- List of solved missing person cases
