= Robert Ledger =

English footballer

Personal information
- Full name: Robert Ledger
- Place of birth: Dipton, County Durham, England
- Height: 5 ft 11 1/4 in (1.81 m)
- Position: Defender

Senior career*
Years	Team	Apps	(Gls)
1913–1914	Huddersfield Town	1	(0)
- * Club domestic league appearances and goals

Robert Ledger (born in the 1890s in Ripon) was a professional footballer who played as a defender for Huddersfield Town. There is no more information about him after World War I.

Robert Ledger was born circa 1895 in Dipton, County Durham England. He joined the league via the amateur club from Mickley, Co Durham. He later joined the Durham Light Infantry regiment and survived the First World War.
