= Sandy McCubbin =

Scottish footballer

Personal information
- Date of birth: 1886
- Place of birth: Greenock, Scotland
- Date of death: Unknown
- Height: 5 ft 9 in (1.75 m)
- Position: Inside forward

Senior career*
Years	Team	Apps	(Gls)
1905–1908	Morton	88	(12)
1908–1909	Bristol Rovers		
1909–1910	Morton	31	(8)
1910–1911	Huddersfield Town	11	(5)
- Lincoln City
- * Club domestic league appearances and goals

Alexander C. McCubbin (born 1886) was a professional footballer who played for Morton, Bristol Rovers, Huddersfield Town and Lincoln City.
