= Arthur Cowley =

English footballer

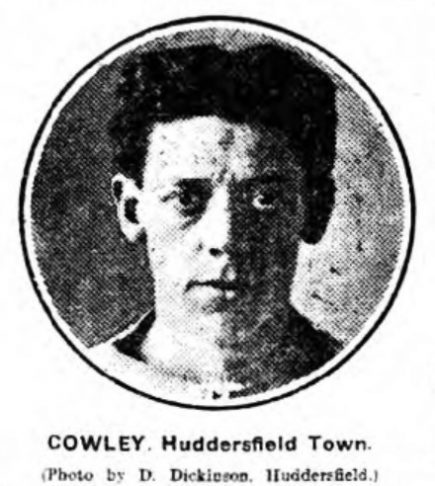
- Cowley while with Huddersfield Town in 1911.

Personal information
- Full name: Arthur Cowley
- Date of birth: 1887
- Place of birth: Hendon, England
- Date of death: Unknown
- Position: Midfielder

Senior career*
Years	Team	Apps	(Gls)
1909–1911	Brentford	2	(0)
1911–1912	Huddersfield Town	5	(2)
- Aberdare Athletic
- * Club domestic league appearances and goals

Arthur Cowley was a professional footballer who played for Huddersfield Town, Brentford and Aberdare Athletic.
