= George Raitt =

Scottish footballer (1888–1960)

Personal information
- Date of birth: 14 August 1888
- Place of birth: Glasgow, Scotland
- Date of death: 24 June 1960 (aged 71)
- Place of death: Brighton, Australia
- Position: Defender

Senior career*
Years	Team	Apps	(Gls)
1909–1911	Cambuslang Rangers		
1911–1912	Huddersfield Town	6	(0)
1913–1925	Melbourne Thistle		

International career
1924	Australia	1	(0)
- * Club domestic league appearances and goals

George Peter Raitt (14 August 1888 – 24 June 1960) was a professional footballer, who played for Huddersfield Town.

Raitt moved to Victoria in Australia where he played for Melbourne Thistle, winning premierships in 1914 and 1915 and the league-cup double in 1925. He captained the first touring Victorian state team in 1914 and continued to appear in representative teams for the state up to 1925.

Raitt played three internationals for Australia, his one full A-international coming in a loss to Canada in 1924 at the age of 35.

He died in 1960 in Melbourne.
