= Freddy Capper =

English footballer

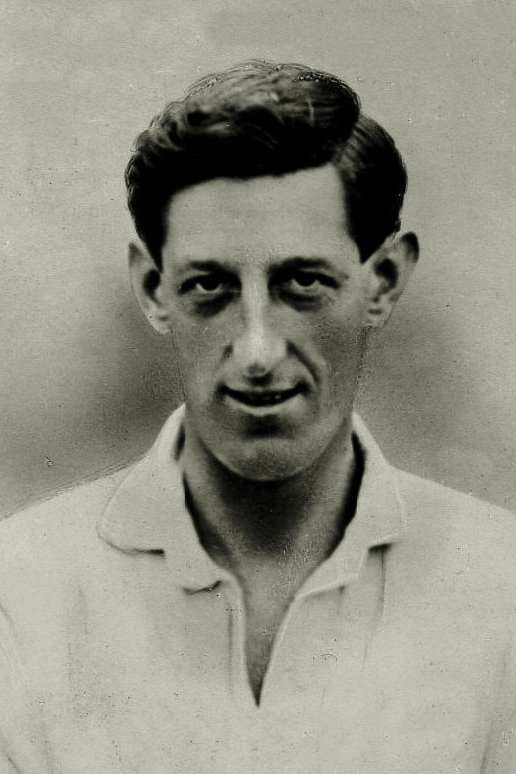
- Capper while with Brentford in 1922

Personal information
- Full name: Alfred Capper
- Date of birth: 8 May 1892
- Place of birth: Winnington, England
- Date of death: 31 October 1955 (aged 63)
- Place of death: Northwich, England
- Height: 5 ft 10 in (1.78 m)
- Position: Outside forward

Youth career
- Winnington Park School
- Winnington Bible Class
- 1909–1910: Northwich Church Lads

Senior career*
Years	Team	Apps	(Gls)
1910–1911	Northwich Victoria		
1911–1913	Manchester United	1	(0)
1913–1914	Witton Albion		
1914–1921	Sheffield Wednesday	59	(4)
1921–1924	Brentford	96	(5)
- * Club domestic league appearances and goals

Alfred Capper (8 May 1892 – 31 October 1955) was an English footballer who played as an outside forward. Born in Knutsford, Cheshire, he played for Northwich Victoria, Manchester United, Witton Albion, Sheffield Wednesday and Brentford.

== Career ==
Born in Winnington, a village just outside Northwich, Cheshire, the son of Joseph Capper. He started work as an apprentice fitter at an alkali works. Capper began his football career with various clubs in the village, before joining Manchester League side Northwich Victoria. In January 1911, he joined Manchester United on an amateur contract, just three months before the team won their second First Division title. Capper's debut came on 23 March 1912, when a spate of injuries – including one to regular outside left George Wall – forced Manchester United to select three debutants for a 1–1 draw with Liverpool at Old Trafford. Capper was later criticised for holding onto the ball too much and failing to use his pace to beat opposing defenders, and he never played for Manchester United again.

In May 1913, he was transfer listed and moved to Lancashire Combination side Witton Albion. During the 1913–14 season, he was part of the Witton Albion side that won the Lancashire Combination Second Division, leading to his return to the Football League with First Division Sheffield Wednesday in May 1914. Despite the outbreak of the First World War in July 1914, the entire 1914–15 season was completed before football was suspended until 1919; Capper made 24 league appearances during the season, as well as one in the FA Cup, scoring four league goals. One of these goals came in a 7–0 win over Bolton Wanderers on 1 March 1915, in which all five forwards and two half-backs got on the scoresheet.

He spent two more seasons with Sheffield Wednesday after the war, making 37 more appearances, before moving to Brentford in August 1921, who had finished 21st out of 22 teams in the inaugural season of the Third Division South. On 11 February 1922, Capper became the first Brentford player to be sent off, receiving his marching orders from referee and future Brentford manager Harry Curtis. In three seasons with Brentford, he made over 100 appearances in all competitions, scoring six goals.

== Personal life ==
Capper served as a second corporal with the Inland Water Transport section of the Royal Engineers during the First World War.
