= 1920–21 Bradford City A.F.C. season =

English football club season

The 1920–21 Bradford City A.F.C. season was the 14th in the club's history.

The club finished 15th in Division One, and reached the 2nd round of the FA Cup.

== Competitions ==
=== First Division ===
==== Table ====
Pos	Team	Pld	W	D	L	GF	GA	GAv	Pts
13	Manchester United	42	15	10	17	64	68	0.941	40
14	West Bromwich Albion	42	13	14	15	54	58	0.931	40
15	Bradford City	42	12	15	15	61	63	0.968	39
16	Preston North End	42	15	9	18	61	65	0.938	39
17	Huddersfield Town	42	15	9	18	42	49	0.857	39

Source: World Football
Rules for classification: 1) Points; 2) Goal average; 3) Goals scored

== Sources ==
- Frost, Terry (1988). Bradford City A Complete Record 1903-1988. Breedon Books Sport. ISBN 0-907969-38-0.
