= John Bethune (footballer) =

Scottish footballer

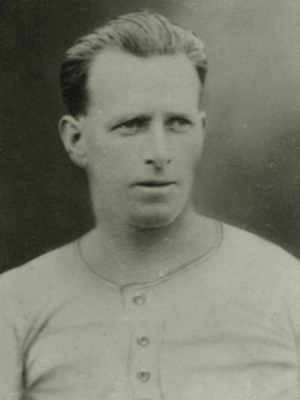
- Bethune while with Bristol Rovers in 1921.

Personal information
- Full name: John Bethune
- Date of birth: 19 October 1888
- Place of birth: Milngavie, Scotland
- Date of death: 23 January 1955 (aged 66)
- Place of death: Sittingbourne, England
- Height: 5 ft 11 in (1.80 m)
- Position: Full back

Senior career*
| Years | Team | Apps | (Gls) |
| 1908–1909 | Milngavie Allander | | |
| 1909–1910 | Vale of Clyde | | |
| 1910–1911 | Ashfield | | |
| 1911–1912 | Heart of Midlothian | 3 | (0) |
- Hamilton Academical
| –1912 | Bonnyrigg Rose Athletic | | |
| 1912 | Darlington | | |
| 1912–1920 | Barnsley | 103 | (1) |
| 1920–1921 | Bristol Rovers | 30 | (0) |
| 1921–1922 | Brentford | 10 | (0) |
| 1922–1927 | Sittingbourne | | |
| 1927–???? | Sittingbourne Paper Mills | | |
- * Club domestic league appearances and goals

John Bethune (19 October 1888 – 23 January 1955), was a professional footballer, who played in both the Scottish Football League and The Football League.

Born in Milngavie near Glasgow, Bethune began his career by playing local football in the Glasgow area for Ashfield. He joined Edinburgh-based side Heart of Midlothian in 1912, for whom he played three times in the Scottish League in a brief spell with them before moving to English clubs Darlington and then Barnsley still within 1912. He settled in Barnsley for almost eight years in a period that was interrupted by the First World War, making over 100 Football League appearances for them.

Bethune, who was known to have a quick temper, joined Bristol Rovers in 1920 for their first season as a Football League club but left for a trial with Brentford in 1921. He played six League games during his trial, and a further four after signing for them permanently, but an injury suffered on Boxing Day that year ended his League career.

He went on to play non-League football for Sittingbourne and Sittingbourne Paper Mills and after retiring as a footballer represented England at indoor bowls in 1936 and 1938.
