= Robert Thomson (footballer, born 1890) =

Scottish footballer

Personal information
- Full name: Robert Thomson
- Date of birth: 1890
- Place of birth: Glasgow, Scotland
- Date of death: Unknown
- Position: Defender

Senior career*
Years	Team	Apps	(Gls)
1911–1912	Huddersfield Town	5	(0)
- * Club domestic league appearances and goals

Robert Thomson (1890–?) was a professional footballer, who played for Huddersfield Town.
