= Gilbert Christie =

Scottish footballer

Personal information
- Full name: Gilbert David Christie
- Date of birth: 18 November 1891
- Place of birth: Dundee, Scotland
- Date of death: 1973 (aged 81–82)
- Height: 5 ft 9 1/4 in (1.76 m)
- Position: Striker

Senior career*
Years	Team	Apps	(Gls)
1913–1914	Huddersfield Town	2	(0)
- Halifax Town
- * Club domestic league appearances and goals

Gilbert David Christie (18 November 1891 – 1973) was a Scottish professional footballer who played for Huddersfield Town and Halifax Town.
