= Ike Whelpton =

English footballer

Personal information
- Full name: James Isaac Whelpton
- Date of birth: 1887
- Place of birth: Sheffield, England
- Date of death: 1944 (aged 56–57)
- Position: Goalkeeper

Senior career*
Years	Team	Apps	(Gls)
1909–1910	Lincoln City	0	(0)
1910–191?	Birmingham	0	(0)
191?–1911	Castleford Town		
1911–1912	Huddersfield Town	2	(0)
1912–1913	Guildford United		
1913–191?	Grimsby Town	1	(0)
–	Guildford United		
1923–1924	Bournemouth & Boscombe Athletic	1	(0)
- * Club domestic league appearances and goals

James Isaac Whelpton (1887–1944) was an English footballer who played in the Football League for Huddersfield Town, Grimsby Town and Bournemouth & Boscombe Athletic. He was on the books of Lincoln City and Birmingham, without playing league football for either, and also played non-league football for Castleford Town and Guildford United.

== Sources ==
- Ian Thomas, Owen Thomas, Alan Hodgson, John Ward (2007). 99 Years and Counting: Stats and Stories. Huddersfield Town A.F.C. ISBN 978-0955728105.
