= James Proctor (footballer) =

English footballer

Personal information
- Date of birth: 1892
- Place of birth: London, England
- Date of death: Unknown
- Position: Striker

Senior career*
| Years | Team | Apps | (Gls) |
| 1911–1912 | Huddersfield Town | 4 | (0) |
- Leicester Fosse
- * Club domestic league appearances and goals

James F. Proctor (born 1892) was a professional footballer, who played for Huddersfield Town and Leicester Fosse.
