= Charles Dinnie =

Scottish footballer

Personal information
- Full name: Charles Dinnie
- Date of birth: 1887
- Place of birth: Arbroath, Scotland
- Date of death: Unknown
- Position: Defender

Senior career*
Years	Team	Apps	(Gls)
- Dundee
1911–1913	Huddersfield Town	17	(0)
- * Club domestic league appearances and goals

Charles Dinnie (born 1887) was a professional footballer, who played for Dundee & Huddersfield Town.
