= George Metcalf (footballer) =

English footballer

Personal information
- Date of birth: 1885
- Place of birth: Easington, County Durham, England
- Date of death: Unknown
- Position: Defender

Senior career*
Years	Team	Apps	(Gls)
- Sunderland
- North Shields
1909–1911	Huddersfield Town	6	(0)
- * Club domestic league appearances and goals

George Metcalf (1885–?) was a professional footballer, who played for Sunderland, North Shields and Huddersfield Town.
