= Joseph Wigmore =

English footballer

Personal information
- Full name: B
- Date of birth: 1892
- Date of death: Unknown
- Position: Defender

Senior career*
Years	Team	Apps	(Gls)
	Huddersfield Town	1	(0)
- * Club domestic league appearances and goals

B. Joseph Wigmore (born 1892) was a professional footballer, who played for Dinnington and Huddersfield Town.
