= Ronald Brebner =

English footballer

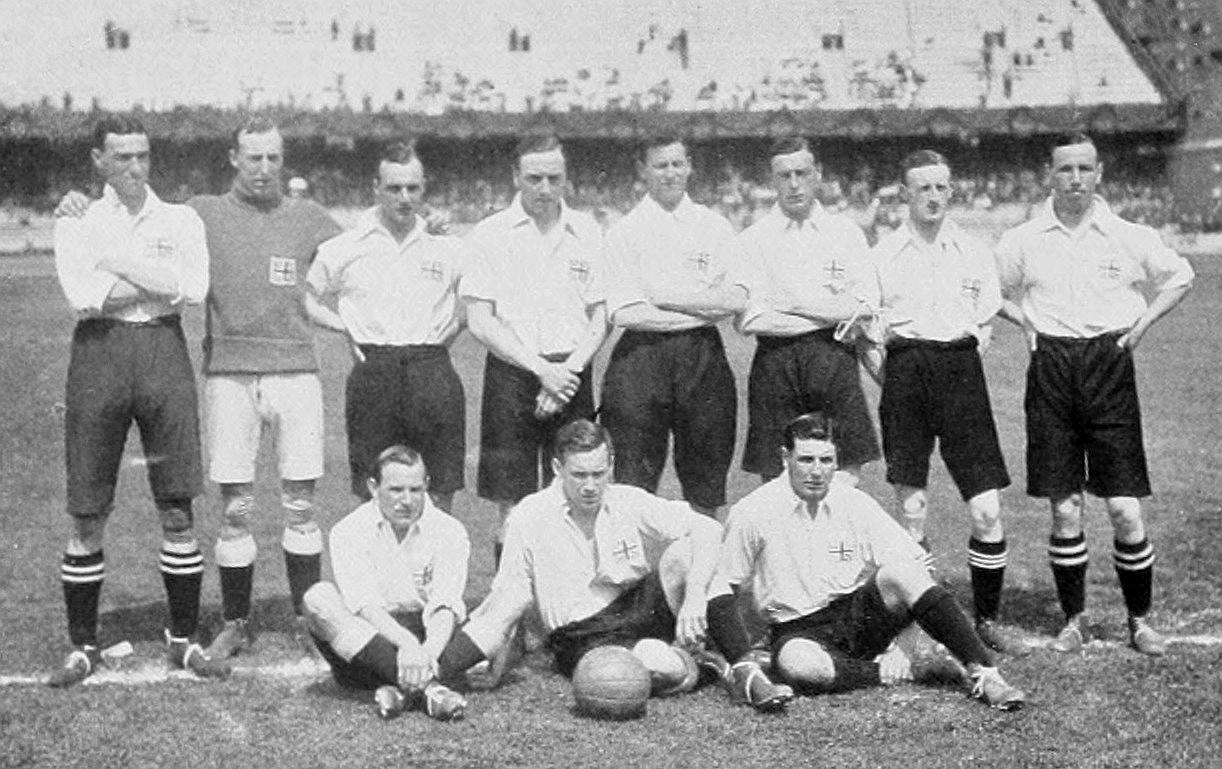
- Brebner was part of Great Britain's 1912 Olympic gold medal winning football team

Personal information
- Full name: Ronald Gilchrist Brebner
- Date of birth: 23 September 1881
- Place of birth: Darlington, England
- Date of death: 11 November 1914 (aged 33)
- Place of death: Chiswick, England
- Height: 5 ft 11 in (1.80 m)
- Position: Goalkeeper

Senior career*
Years	Team	Apps	(Gls)
1897–1899	Edinburgh University		
1899–1902	Northern Nomads		
1902–1904	London Caledonians		
1904–1905	Elgin City		
1905	Sunderland	2	(0)
1906	Chelsea	1	(0)
1911–1912	Darlington		
1912–1913	Chelsea	17	(0)
1913–1914	Leicester Fosse		
Medal record
Men's football
Representing Great Britain
Olympic Games
Gold medal – first place	1912 Stockholm	Team competition
- * Club domestic league appearances and goals

Ronald Gilchrist Brebner (23 September 1881 – 11 November 1914) was an English amateur footballer who competed in the 1912 Summer Olympics in Stockholm, Sweden.

Brebner was born in Darlington. He was the goalkeeper of the English team, which won the gold medal in the football tournament. He played all three matches.

He died young as a result of a football injury. He sustained head injuries whilst guarding the Leicester Fosse goal. He had two spells at Chelsea, and also played club football for Stockton & the Northern Nomads amateur teams as well as for Huddersfield Town.
