= George Blackburn (footballer, born 1888) =

English footballer

Personal information
- Date of birth: 1888
- Place of birth: Worksop, England
- Date of death: Unknown
- Position: Midfielder

Senior career*
Years	Team	Apps	(Gls)
- Bradford Park Avenue
1910–1912	Huddersfield Town	37	(6)
- * Club domestic league appearances and goals

George Blackburn (born 1888) was a professional footballer, who played for Bradford Park Avenue and Huddersfield Town.
