= Dick Pudan =

English footballer (1881–1957)

Personal information
- Full name: Albert Ernest Pudan
- Date of birth: 1881
- Place of birth: West Ham, England
- Date of death: 1957 (aged 75–76)
- Place of death: Clacton-on-Sea, England
- Height: 5 ft 9 1/2 in (1.77 m)
- Position: Full-back

Senior career*
Years	Team	Apps	(Gls)
1898–1900	Clapton		
1900–1902	West Ham United	7	(0)
1902–1907	Bristol Rovers	116	(0)
1907–1909	Newcastle United	24	(0)
1909–1910	Leicester Fosse	29	(7)
1910–1912	Huddersfield Town	0	(0)
1912–1913	Leicester Fosse	17	(0)

Managerial career
- 1910–1912: Huddersfield Town
- * Club domestic league appearances and goals

Albert Ernest "Dick" Pudan (1881–1957) (Note: Due to his nickname of Dick, some sources mistakenly refer to him as Richard Pudan.) was an English professional footballer, who played as a full-back in the late 19th and early 20th centuries. During his career he made most appearances for Bristol Rovers, but also featured for West Ham United, Newcastle United and Leicester Fosse. He also managed Huddersfield Town between 1910 and 1912.

== Career ==
Pudan initially played as an amateur for Clapton, turning professional in 1900 when he joined West Ham United. He made his debut for The Hammers on 12 January 1901 in a 1–0 defeat to Bristol City in the Southern League, and played again a week later against Swindon Town. These were his only first team appearances during the 1900–01 season, and he would play just five more Southern League games the following year before signing for Bristol Rovers in the summer of 1902.

He played regularly as a full-back for Bristol Rovers, amassing a total of 116 Southern League appearances and one league title during his five-year stay. He was made club captain in 1906, but his relationship with the team deteriorated when they refused to allow him to take up an offer of a professional cricket contract in April 1907. Pudan walked out of the club, who reported him to The Football Association resulting in him receiving an indefinite ban. Rovers re-signed him ahead of the 1907–08 season, but immediately transferred him to Newcastle United for "a handsome transfer fee".

Pudan won an FA Cup runners-up medal with Newcastle in 1908, and made a total of 24 Football League appearances for them. He moved to Leicester Fosse in 1909 and played 29 league games during the 1909–10 season, scoring seven goals, despite not having scored once in the previous nine years.

He had a spell managing Huddersfield Town between 1910 and 1912, their first two seasons in the Football League, before returning for a second spell playing for Leicester. He turned out a further 17 times for them before finally retiring from playing in 1913.

== Personal life ==
Pudan was born in London in 1881 to parents Thomas Pudan and Martha Wiggins of West Ham. He married Mabel Sheermur in 1903, and at the time of the 1911 census they had one daughter, Edna.

== Honours ==
Bristol Rovers

- Southern Football League: 1904–05

Newcastle United

- FA Cup runner-up: 1908
