= James Dow (footballer) =

English footballer

Personal information
- Full name: James Frazer Dow
- Date of birth: 27 March 1889
- Place of birth: Sunderland, England
- Date of death: 1972 (aged 82–83)
- Place of death: Sunderland, England
- Height: 5 ft 10 3/4 in (1.80 m)
- Position: Defender

Senior career*
| Years | Team | Apps | (Gls) |
| 1912–1915 | Huddersfield Town | 47 | (0) |
- Carlisle United
- * Club domestic league appearances and goals

James Frazer Dow (27 March 1889 – 1972) was an English professional footballer who played as a defender for Huddersfield Town and Carlisle United. He was born in Sunderland.
