= William Bartlett (footballer) =

English footballer (1878–1939)

Personal information
- Full name: William John Bartlett
- Date of birth: 13 April 1878
- Place of birth: Newcastle upon Tyne, England
- Date of death: 6 August 1939 (aged 61)
- Place of death: Belfast, Northern Ireland
- Position: Defender

Youth career
- Brandon
- Gateshead N.E.R.

Senior career*
Years	Team	Apps	(Gls)
1903–1910	Sheffield Wednesday	176	(2)
1910–1912	Huddersfield Town	65	(2)
- Linfield
- * Club domestic league appearances and goals

William John Bartlett (13 April 1878 – 6 August 1939) was an English professional footballer, who played for Sheffield Wednesday, Huddersfield Town and Linfield.

Bartlett stayed in Belfast after his football career ended, where he worked as a member of the Belfast Corporation Surveyor's Department. After a short illness, he died at Royal Victoria Hospital in Belfast, age 61. He was survived by his wife, Margaret Bartlett. His funeral was held at Belfast City Cemetery, where a large attendance came to pay their respects, including representatives of Linfield F.C., the Irish Football Association, Irish Football League, and the Belfast Corporation.
