= William Campion (Jesuit) =

English Jesuit

William Campion, alias William Wigmore, (1599–1665), was an English Jesuit.

Campion was a native of Herefordshire, who entered the Society of Jesus at Watten, near St. Omer, in 1624. He became a professed father in 1640. He was employed in missions within Britain for many years, being appointed rector of St. Francis Xavier's 'college' (that is, a district, in this case comprising the Welsh missions) in 1655. Afterwards he was appointed rector of the House of Tertians (tertians being Jesuits in their final year of probation.) at Ghent, where he died on 28 September 1665. He published anonymously an octavo volume, without place or date, 'On the Catholic Doctrine of Transubstantiation, against Dr. John Cosin,' who later, in 1660, became (the Anglican) bishop of Durham.
