= Joe Jee =

English footballer

Personal information
- Full name: Joseph William Jee
- Date of birth: 1883
- Place of birth: Chorlton-cum-Hardy, England
- Date of death: Unknown
- Height: 5 ft 6 in (1.68 m)
- Position: Outside left

Senior career*
Years	Team	Apps	(Gls)
1906–1908	Bolton Wanderers	6	(1)
1908–1909	Brighton & Hove Albion	31	(5)
1909–1919	Huddersfield Town (Note: Huddersfield Town figures exclude 1909–10 Midland League season.)	171	(30)
1919–19??	Nelson		
- * Club domestic league appearances and goals

Joseph William Jee (1883 – after 1919) was an English professional footballer who played as an outside left in the Football League for Bolton Wanderers and Huddersfield Town and in the Southern League for Brighton & Hove Albion.
