= James Macauley =

Irish footballer

Jim MacAuley
Personal information
- Full name: James Lowry MacAuley
- Date of birth: 24 November 1889
- Place of birth: Portarlington, Ireland
- Date of death: 8 October 1945 (aged 55)
- Place of death: Preston, England
- Height: 5 ft 10 in (1.78 m)
- Position: Inside forward

Senior career*
Years	Team	Apps	(Gls)
1906–1907	Cloughfern		
1907	Cliftonville Olympic		
1907–1910	Cliftonville		
1910	Rangers	1	(0)
1910–1914	Huddersfield Town	95	(32)
1914–1915	Preston North End	59	(23)
1917–1919	Belfast Celtic		
1919–1920	Leicester Fosse	19	(2)
1920–1921	Grimsby Town	16	(4)
1921–1923	Lancaster Town		
1923–192?	Morecambe		
- * Club domestic league appearances and goals

James Lowry Macauley (born 24 November 1889 – 8 October 1945) was a professional footballer, who played for Rangers, Huddersfield Town and Preston North End. He also played football for Ireland, scoring one goal from six caps. He played as an inside forward.

== Career ==
His family moved to Belfast when he was young and he attended St. Enoch's Presbyterian School, before going to Belfast Royal Academy. McAuley played amateur football for Cliftonville, scoring in their Irish Cup final replay win over Bohemians in Dublin in 1909 and the Irish League victory in 1910, before signing for Rangers. During the Great war he returned to Ireland and guested for Belfast Celtic. In 1919 he returned to England, and played for Leicester City in the Second Division, the club had recently formed after the disbanding of the previous team in the city. At the end of his career he played for Grimsby Town and Lancaster Town and Morecambe.

== Honours ==
Cliftonville

- Irish Cup 1909
- Irish League 1910

Preston North End

- Division Two Runners-up 1914-15

== Bibliography ==
- Thomas, Ian; Thomas, Owen; Hodgson, Alan; Ward, John (2007). 99 years & counting : stats and stories, 1908-2008 : Huddersfield Town A.F.C. centenary history. Huddersfield: Huddersfield Town Football Club. ISBN 978-0955728105.
