= Simon Beaton =

Scottish footballer

Personal information
- Full name: Simon Beaton
- Date of birth: 1888
- Place of birth: Inverness, Scotland
- Date of death: 1959 (aged 70–71)
- Place of death: Middlesbrough, England
- Height: 5 ft 7 1/2 in (1.71 m)
- Position: Defender

Senior career*
Years	Team	Apps	(Gls)
- Newcastle United
1910–1914	Huddersfield Town	111	(0)
- * Club domestic league appearances and goals

Simon Beaton (1888–1959) was a professional footballer, who played for Newcastle United and Huddersfield Town.
