= Fred Blackman =

English footballer

Personal information
- Full name: Frederick Ernest Blackman
- Date of birth: 8 February 1884
- Place of birth: Kennington, England
- Height: 5 ft 10 in (1.78 m)
- Position: Full back

Senior career*
Years	Team	Apps	(Gls)
190?–1907	Woolwich Arsenal	0	(0)
1907–1909	Hastings & St Leonards United		
1909–1911	Brighton & Hove Albion	76	(0)
1911–1914	Huddersfield Town	92	(0)
1914–1919	Leeds City	44	(0)
1919–1922	Queens Park Rangers	60	(0)
- * Club domestic league appearances and goals

Frederick Ernest Blackman (8 February 1884 – after 1922) was an English professional footballer, who played for Woolwich Arsenal, Hastings & St Leonards United, Brighton & Hove Albion, Huddersfield Town, Leeds City and Queens Park Rangers.
