= 1923–24 Huddersfield Town A.F.C. season =

Huddersfield Town
1923–24 season
- Chairman: Joseph Barlow
- Manager: Herbert Chapman
- Stadium: Leeds Road
- Football League First Division: 1st (champion, 1st English title)
- FA Cup: Third round (eliminated by Burnley)
- Top goalscorer: League: Charlie Wilson (18 goals); All: Charlie Wilson (20 goals)
- Highest home attendance: 33,178 vs Burnley (22 April 1924)
- Lowest home attendance: 6,000 vs Newcastle United (27 February 1924)
- Biggest win: 6–1 vs Arsenal (22 December 1923)
- Biggest defeat: 0–2 vs Middlesbrough (1 September 1923); 1–3 vs Bolton Wanderers (17 November 1923); 1–3 vs Aston Villa (17 April 1924)
Home colours

The 1923–24 Huddersfield Town season saw Town become the champion of English football for the first time. They beat Welsh side Cardiff City to the title by goal average.

== Squad at the start of the season ==
Note: Flags indicate national team as defined under FIFA eligibility rules; some limited exceptions apply. Players may hold more than one non-FIFA nationality.

| Pos. | Nation | Player |
|---|---|---|
| GK | ENG | Billy Cowell |
| GK | ENG | Ted Taylor |
| DF | ENG | Ned Barkas |
| DF | ENG | Harry Cawthorne |
| DF | ENG | Roy Goodall |
| DF | ENG | Albert Smith |
| DF | ENG | Norman Smith |
| DF | SCO | David Steele |
| DF | ENG | Sam Wadsworth |
| DF | ENG | Billy Watson |

| Pos. | Nation | Player |
|---|---|---|
| DF | ENG | Tom Wilson |
| MF | SCO | Billy Johnston |
| MF | ENG | George Richardson |
| MF | ENG | Billy Smith |
| MF | ENG | Joe Walter |
| FW | ENG | George Brown |
| FW | ENG | George Cook |
| FW | ENG | Ernie Islip |
| FW | ENG | Clem Stephenson |
| FW | ENG | Charlie Wilson |

== Review ==
After finishing 3rd the previous season and winning the FA Cup the season before, some thought that a championship under Herbert Chapman wasn't impossible. The season would see Town reach the pinnacle of football excellence and win the 1st Division.

This was done with Town only having 5 different scorers all season; George Brown with 8, George Cook with 9, Clem Stephenson with 11, Billy Smith with 13 and Charlie Wilson top-scoring with 18 league goals. (Billy Johnston did score an FA Cup goal). The title went down to the last match and Town's 3–0 win over Nottingham Forest giving Town their title by goal average.

== Squad at the end of the season ==
Note: Flags indicate national team as defined under FIFA eligibility rules; some limited exceptions apply. Players may hold more than one non-FIFA nationality.

| Pos. | Nation | Player |
|---|---|---|
| GK | ENG | Leonard Boot |
| GK | ENG | Billy Cowell |
| GK | ENG | Ted Taylor |
| DF | ENG | Ned Barkas |
| DF | ENG | Harry Cawthorne |
| DF | ENG | Roy Goodall |
| DF | ENG | George Shaw |
| DF | ENG | Albert Smith |
| DF | ENG | Norman Smith |
| DF | SCO | David Steele |
| DF | ENG | Sam Wadsworth |

| Pos. | Nation | Player |
|---|---|---|
| DF | ENG | Billy Watson |
| DF | ENG | Tom Wilson |
| MF | SCO | Billy Johnston |
| MF | ENG | Ted Richardson |
| MF | ENG | Billy Smith |
| MF | ENG | Joe Walter |
| FW | ENG | George Brown |
| FW | ENG | George Cook |
| FW | ENG | Clem Stephenson |
| FW | ENG | Charlie Wilson |

== Results ==
=== Division One ===
| Date | Opponents | Home/ Away | Result F - A | Scorers | Attendance | Position |
|---|---|---|---|---|---|---|
| 25 August 1923 | Middlesbrough | H | 1 - 0 | C. Wilson | 20,000 | 1st |
| 27 August 1923 | Preston North End | A | 3 - 1 | B. Smith, C. Wilson, Stephenson | 18,331 | 2nd |
| 1 September 1923 | Middlesbrough | A | 0 - 2 | | 20,000 | 6th |
| 4 September 1923 | Preston North End | H | 4 - 0 | B. Smith, C. Wilson (2), Stephenson | 14,198 | 2nd |
| 8 September 1923 | Notts County | A | 0 - 1 | | 20,000 | 6th |
| 15 September 1923 | Notts County | H | 0 - 0 | | 16,000 | 8th |
| 22 September 1923 | Everton | A | 1 - 1 | Brown | 35,000 | 9th |
| 29 September 1923 | Everton | H | 2 - 0 | Brown, Stephenson | 16,500 | 4th |
| 6 October 1923 | West Bromwich Albion | A | 4 - 2 | B. Smith (2), Cook (2) | 17,041 | 4th |
| 13 October 1923 | West Bromwich Albion | H | 0 - 0 | | 18,800 | 5th |
| 20 October 1923 | Birmingham | A | 1 - 0 | B. Smith | 18,000 | 3rd |
| 27 October 1923 | Birmingham | H | 1 - 0 | Stephenson | 12,000 | 1st |
| 3 November 1923 | Liverpool | A | 1 - 1 | Stephenson | 30,000 | 2nd |
| 10 November 1923 | Liverpool | H | 3 - 1 | Cook (2), W. Wadsworth (og) | 15,400 | 2nd |
| 17 November 1923 | Bolton Wanderers | A | 1 - 3 | C. Wilson | 17,630 | 2nd |
| 24 November 1923 | Bolton Wanderers | H | 1 - 0 | Cook | 18,000 | 2nd |
| 1 December 1923 | Sunderland | A | 1 - 2 | C. Wilson | 29,000 | 3rd |
| 8 December 1923 | Sunderland | H | 3 - 2 | C. Wilson (2), B. Smith | 18,600 | 3rd |
| 15 December 1923 | Arsenal | A | 3 - 1 | C. Wilson (3) | 25,000 | 2nd |
| 22 December 1923 | Arsenal | H | 6 - 1 | Cook, C. Wilson (3), Stephenson (2) | 15,000 | 2nd |
| 25 December 1923 | Tottenham Hotspur | A | 0 - 1 | | 44,274 | 3rd |
| 26 December 1923 | Tottenham Hotspur | H | 2 - 1 | B. Smith (2 pens) | 28,600 | 3rd |
| 29 December 1923 | Blackburn Rovers | A | 0 - 1 | | 18,000 | 3rd |
| 5 January 1924 | Blackburn Rovers | H | 1 - 0 | Stephenson | 16,300 | 4th |
| 19 January 1924 | Chelsea | H | 0 - 1 | | 14,200 | 4th |
| 26 January 1924 | Chelsea | A | 1 - 0 | Stephenson | 33,500 | 4th |
| 9 February 1924 | Newcastle United | A | 1 - 0 | Stephenson | 25,000 | 4th |
| 16 February 1924 | West Ham United | H | 1 - 1 | B. Smith | 12,500 | 4th |
| 27 February 1924 | Newcastle United | H | 1 - 1 | Stephenson | 6,000 | 4th |
| 1 March 1924 | Cardiff City | H | 2 - 0 | Brown (2) | 18,000 | 3rd |
| 15 March 1924 | Sheffield United | A | 1 - 0 | Brown | 29,000 | 4th |
| 22 March 1924 | Sheffield United | H | 1 - 0 | C. Wilson | 19,500 | 3rd |
| 27 March 1924 | West Ham United | A | 3 - 2 | B. Smith, C. Wilson (2) | 15,000 | 1st |
| 5 April 1924 | Aston Villa | H | 1 - 0 | B. Smith (pen) | 26,280 | 3rd |
| 12 April 1924 | Manchester City | H | 1 - 1 | Brown | 11,000 | 2nd |
| 14 April 1924 | Cardiff City | A | 0 - 0 | | 24,000 | 1st |
| 18 April 1924 | Burnley | A | 1 - 1 | Brown | 25,000 | 2nd |
| 19 April 1924 | Manchester City | A | 1 - 1 | C. Wilson | 30,000 | 2nd |
| 22 April 1924 | Burnley | H | 1 - 0 | B. Smith | 33,178 | 1st |
| 26 April 1924 | Nottingham Forest | A | 1 - 1 | Cook | 12,000 | 2nd |
| 30 April 1924 | Aston Villa | A | 1 - 3 | B. Smith | 33,000 | 2nd |
| 3 May 1924 | Nottingham Forest | H | 3 - 0 | Cook (2), Brown | 19,000 | 1st |

=== FA Cup ===
| Date | Round | Opponents | Home/ Away | Result F - A | Scorers | Attendance |
|---|---|---|---|---|---|---|
| 12 January 1924 | Round 1 | Birmingham | H | 1 - 0 | Johnston | 30,924 |
| 2 February 1924 | Round 2 | Manchester United | A | 3 - 0 | C. Wilson (2), Stephenson | 66,678 |
| 23 February 1924 | Round 3 | Burnley | A | 0 - 1 | | 54,775 |

== Appearances and goals ==
| Name | Nationality | Position | League | | FA Cup | | Total | |
| Name | Nationality | Position | Apps | Goals | Apps | Goals | Apps | Goals |
|---|---|---|---|---|---|---|---|---|
| Ned Barkas | England | DF | 21 | 0 | 2 | 0 | 23 | 0 |
| Leonard Boot | England | GK | 5 | 0 | 0 | 0 | 5 | 0 |
| George Brown | England | FW | 22 | 8 | 1 | 0 | 23 | 8 |
| Harry Cawthorne | England | DF | 16 | 0 | 0 | 0 | 16 | 0 |
| George Cook | England | FW | 25 | 9 | 1 | 0 | 26 | 9 |
| Billy Cowell | England | GK | 2 | 0 | 0 | 0 | 2 | 0 |
| Roy Goodall | England | DF | 14 | 0 | 1 | 0 | 15 | 0 |
| Ernie Islip | England | FW | 3 | 0 | 0 | 0 | 3 | 0 |
| Billy Johnston | Scotland | FW | 8 | 0 | 3 | 1 | 11 | 1 |
| George Richardson | England | MF | 2 | 0 | 0 | 0 | 2 | 0 |
| Ted Richardson | England | MF | 5 | 0 | 0 | 0 | 5 | 0 |
| George Shaw | England | DF | 9 | 0 | 0 | 0 | 9 | 0 |
| Albert Smith | England | FW | 8 | 0 | 0 | 0 | 8 | 0 |
| Billy Smith | England | MF | 39 | 13 | 3 | 0 | 42 | 13 |
| David Steele | Scotland | DF | 31 | 0 | 3 | 0 | 34 | 0 |
| Clem Stephenson | England | FW | 40 | 11 | 3 | 1 | 43 | 12 |
| Ted Taylor | England | GK | 35 | 0 | 3 | 0 | 38 | 0 |
| Sam Wadsworth | England | DF | 37 | 0 | 3 | 0 | 40 | 0 |
| Joe Walter | England | MF | 26 | 0 | 2 | 0 | 28 | 0 |
| Billy Watson | England | DF | 42 | 0 | 3 | 0 | 45 | 0 |
| Charlie Wilson | England | FW | 31 | 18 | 2 | 2 | 33 | 20 |
| Tom Wilson | England | DF | 41 | 0 | 3 | 0 | 44 | 0 |
