= History of Huddersfield Town A.F.C. =

History of an English football club

The history of Huddersfield Town A.F.C., an English football club based in Huddersfield, West Yorkshire, dates back to the club's formation in 1908.

Chart showing the progress of Huddersfield Town F.C. through the English football league system from 1910–11 to the present day.

In 1926, Huddersfield became the first club to win three successive English League titles – a feat which only four other clubs have been able to match. They also won the FA Cup in 1922 and have been runners-up on four other occasions.

== Formation and Liquidation (1908–1912) ==
In 1908, the club was formed in the Albert Pub, Huddersfield and the Huddersfield Association Football Ground Co. was formed and, with capital of £500, set about purchasing the Leeds Road recreation fields. The stadium just started as a pitch but was still ready for their first game, which was a local semi-final. On 15 August 1908, Huddersfield Town Association Football Club was registered as a limited company. Fred Walker was appointed as the club's first manager. The stadium was opened on 2 September with a game against Bradford Park Avenue, which was also the club's first game, Huddersfield beat Bradford, 2–1 in front of a crowd of 1000. Their first match in a senior competition, came 3 days later (5 September), against South Shields Adelaide in which "salmon pink" shirts were worn.

In 1910, Huddersfield tried to gain entry to The Football League. The club had invited the ubiquitous Archibald Leitch to completely reconstruct Leeds Road at an estimated cost of £6,000. The pitch was to be turned by 90 degrees and a 4000-seat stand was to be constructed, with a design which was similar to those of Chelsea, Fulham and Tottenham Hotspur. Terracing was also planned, to provide an overall capacity of 34,000. After the plans went through Huddersfield directors applied successfully to become members of the Football League and development of Leeds Road began immediately.

The stadium was finished a year later and the club was granted Football League status. The stadium was officially opened on 2 September 1911 by The Football League president John McKenna. Not all was well with the club and the new ground, attendances sunk below 7,000 and the pitch had deteriorated. The club's directors attempted to sue Leitch but they had massive debt and in 1912 sank into liquidation. Town played on until 1915 when the League stopped during World War One.

== Re-formation and Golden Days (1919–1945) ==
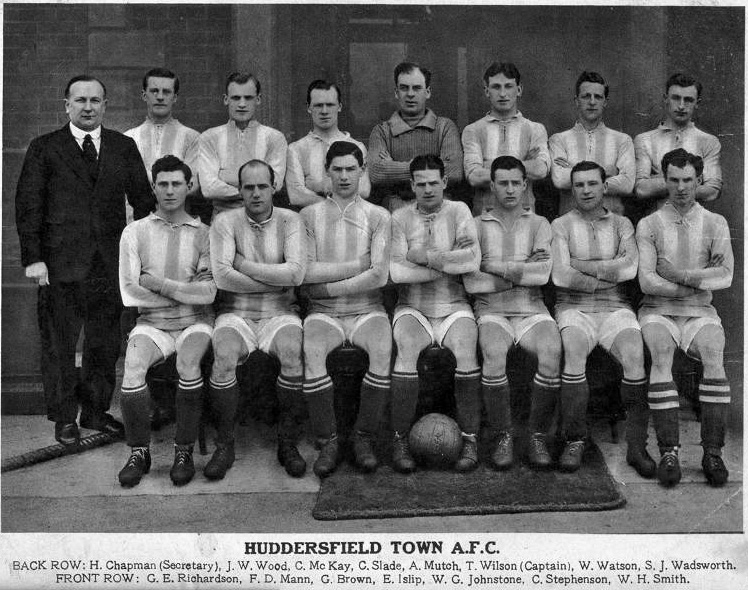
The team that won the 1922 FA Cup

In 1919, Huddersfield Town continued but fared no better and were reportedly £25,000 in debt, prompting a plan to move to Elland Road (previously of Leeds City) in Leeds and sell the Leeds Road site for redevelopment. The reports galvanised supporters to start fund-raising to stave off the move. After a month of fundraising and negotiations the club stayed in Huddersfield. Huddersfield Town then reached the 1920 FA Cup final and won promotion to Division One for the first time.

During their first season in the top flight, the former Leeds City manager Herbert Chapman was brought in (after Huddersfield helped him overturn his ban) as the new assistant to Ambrose Langley after a disappointing run of results, which saw Town battling against relegation. At the end of March, with only seven league matches left to play, Chapman replaced Langley as manager and Huddersfield won four of those last seven matches. They eventually finished 17th, four places above the relegation zone.

The 31-year-old inside forward Clem Stephenson was acquired from Aston Villa for £4,000 and 18-year-old George "Bomber" Brown (who went on to become Town's all-time top scorer) was placed up front, linking up with Billy Smith. Chapman convinced the Huddersfield board to acquire the ageing Stephenson, who was renowned for his passing and vision, after stating that "the young players need a general to lead them". He implemented the basics of his famous W-M formation at his spell at The Terriers. His tactics were based upon the principles of a strong defence and a fast, counter-attacking response, with the focus on quick, short passing and mazy runs from his wingers, who would pass low inside the defence instead of crossing from the byline. Chapman is regarded as the first manager to successfully employ the counter-attack. Other progressive ideas included a disciplined fitness regime for the players and starting the practice of reserve and youth teams playing the same style as the senior team.

In Chapman's first full season in charge, Town finished in a mediocre 14th place. However, that season saw The Terriers win their first major honour, beating Preston North End 1–0 to win the FA Cup, Smith scoring the only goal. Huddersfield went on to win the Charity Shield for the first and thus far only time, beating Liverpool 1–0. After being granted control of all footballing affairs at the club by the board, which was very revolutionary at the time, Chapman employed a wide-ranging scouting network to find the right players for his tactical system. Backed up by the prize money of the FA Cup run, Chapman bought goalkeeper Ted Taylor and centre-forward Charlie Wilson. Herbert Chapman had already brought in the future England internationals Sam Wadsworth and Roy Goodall the previous season, and they formed a strong defence with Billy Watson and Tom Wilson. Town finished in third place in 1922–23.

The following season, Huddersfield fought off Cardiff City and Sunderland to be crowned champions of England for the first time, although it was by the narrowest of margins. Goal average proved to be decisive as Town and Cardiff both finished on 57 points, Huddersfield winning it by a difference of 0.024 (1.818 to 1.794) in goal average. This proved the importance of the third Huddersfield goal scored by Brown in a 3–0 win over Nottingham Forest and the missed penalty of Cardiff against Birmingham in the last match of the season. The Terriers only had five different scorers in the league all season; George Brown with 8 goals, George Cook with 9, Clem Stephenson with 11, Billy Smith with 13 and Charlie Wilson with 18.

During these very successful early years, Huddersfield's fan base increased, necessitating more capacity at their Leeds Road home. The terracing was extended so that it could hold 47,000 for a cup tie against Liverpool, and further work eventually led to the capacity increasing to 60,000.

The 1924–25 season started off well, with the new signing of winger Joey Williams and having an unbeaten streak in the first ten matches. Town slipped to ninth place in November, but retained the league title after only one more loss in the 27 remaining matches, after Chapman signed goalkeeper Billy Mercer to replace the injured Taylor. Huddersfield only conceded 28 goals in the league and never more than two in any league game. In October 1924, Billy Smith became the first player in history to score directly from a corner. After winning successive league titles, Herbert Chapman left for the more fashionable Arsenal, who offered to double his wages and attracted larger crowds than Huddersfield.

Cecil Potter was brought in as Chapman's successor and the highly rated Scottish winger Alex Jackson was bought (by Chapman days before he left for Arsenal) for a record £5,000. Injury to Wilson saw George Cook being placed up front with Brown and Jackson. The new front three scored more than two-thirds of Town's league goals during the 1925–26 season, as Huddersfield completed a historic hat-trick of league titles. The runners-up were Chapman's Arsenal, as The Terriers finished five points clear of The Gunners.

Town came close to winning a fourth consecutive title the following season. With three matches remaining, Huddersfield defeated Newcastle United to go a point behind them in the table. However, Huddersfield failed to win any of their last three matches and thus handed the title to The Magpies. The 1927–28 season saw Town finish runners-up in both the league and the FA Cup, narrowly failing to become the first since Aston Villa in 1896–97 to win the double. George Brown became Town's top scorer with 35 goals.

In March 1928, an international match between England and Scotland in the 1928 British Home Championship at Wembley featured five Town players. Tom Wilson, Bob Kelly, Billy Smith and Roy Goodall started for England, while Alex Jackson played for Scotland. Jackson scored a hat-trick as Scotland, nicknamed "The Wembley Wizards" after the match, thrashed England 5–1.

The team was ageing and players were not adequately replaced. Only five top-six finishes in the following eleven seasons followed, although two more FA Cup finals were reached under their new manager and former player Clem Stephenson. In 1930, The Terriers were beaten 2–0 by Chapman's Arsenal and in 1938 they lost to Preston in extra time.

Stephenson went on to become Huddersfield's longest-serving manager, managing them from 1929 until 1942. He also oversaw Town's biggest win in history, a 10–1 victory at home to Blackpool in December 1930.

Leeds Road

Leeds Road had very modest improvements despite Huddersfield's success, and in February 1932 Huddersfield recorded a record attendance of 67,037 against a Herbert Chapman led Arsenal; this led to two fans being crushed and over one hundred injured. During this game, 5,000 fans broke through the gates on the Popular Side while hundreds spilled onto the track. Five years later, the terracing barriers caved in again leading to four injuries on this occasion, which led to the club having to improve the barriers.

== Post-World War II (1945–1970) ==
Huddersfield Town, stayed in the top division until 1950 when disaster struck. A fire burnt down the schoolboy enclosure and the club were forced to move to Leeds United's Elland Road for two games. In the 1951–52 season, Huddersfield struggled in the top division and in April 1952, Andy Beattie was appointed manager, but failed to keep the Terriers up in the top division and they were relegated for the first time in their history. Beattie was one of the youngest managers in the Football League, and had two horseshoes nailed to his office wall for luck. During the summer he made four crucial signings, full-back Ron Staniforth, utility player Tommy Cavanagh and inside forward Jimmy Watson. At the end of the season, Huddersfield finished runners-up in Division Two sealing an immediate return.

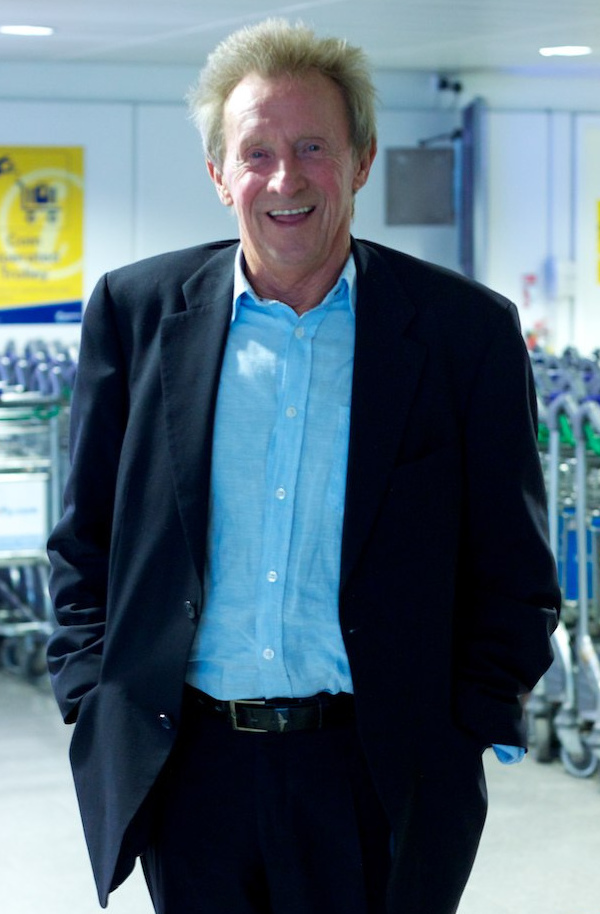
Denis Law

Following their return to the top division, Huddersfield continued to climb the table and finished in third place, which remains Huddersfield's highest finish since World War II. The following season, Huddersfield slipped down the table finishing 12th and Beattie offered to resign despite their run to the FA Cup quarter-finals but was persuaded to stay on. Town appointed Bill Shankly to assist Beattie, the two men having been former teammates at Preston North End, but the following season Huddersfield were relegated in a season which saw the emergence of future England full-back Ray Wilson. Beattie then resigned in November 1956, believing that he had taken the team as far as he could, and Shankly was appointed as manager.

During the 1957–58 season, Shankly oversaw a Huddersfield side who became the only side to score six goals and lose the game against Charlton Athletic which finished 7–6, despite being 5–1 up with 30 minutes remaining. Shankly left on 1 December 1959, to manage Liverpool, Eddie Boot was appointed the day after. Floodlights were installed at Leeds Road in 1961, this was financed by the £55,000 transfer of Denis Law to Manchester City. They became known as the "Denis Law Lights". Two of them collapsed in a heavy gale a year later and they were all replaced.

It wasn't until 1970, that Huddersfield returned to the first division, under the guidance of Ian Greaves, who was appointed on 11 June 1968. The team struggled on their return to the top flight of English football, and finished the season in 15th place.

== Decline (1970–1978) ==
The second season in Division One, led to relegation in 1972 and saw three of their best players leaving at the end of the season. Trevor Cherry and Roy Ellam signed for Leeds United and Frank Worthington went to Leicester City. Alan Gowling and Phil Summerill signed in the close season but that wasn't enough to stop a second consecutive relegation to Division Three. This was the first time Town had played in the third tier of English football and only managed a 10th-place finish which led to Ian Greaves resigning at the end of the season. Former Leeds United player Bobby Collins came in to replace him but he led the club to relegation and Huddersfield became the first league champions to slip into the Division Four in 1975.

At the beginning of 1975, former manager Tom Johnston returned to the club as General Manager and once again Town returned to all blue shirts that Johnston had introduced in the 1960s, he ended up replacing Collins as sole manager in December 1975. Johnston managed a fifth-placed finish at the end of that season. During the 1976–77 season, John Haselden became the Manager with Johnston once again moving upstairs to his previous role. This, however, did not last as Johnston demoted Haselden in September 1977 and gave himself the job and managed Town to their lowest ever league position of 11th at the end of the 1977–78 season. At one point, Town had sat in 91st place in the Football League under manager John Haselden.

In August 1978 Johnston resigned and Physio Mick Buxton became caretaker manager which saw an upturn in form and he was given the job full-time in October 1978 with his Assistant/Physio John Haselden.

== Recovery (1978–1993) ==
A recovery started under Mick Buxton, the physio who had been hired during the previous year. Tom Johnston had retired, due to old age and losing the respect of the playing faithful. Buxton set about revitalising the club, he demanded respect from the players and brought in harder training sessions which were taken by himself and John Haselden who had been promoted to Assistant Manager as well as taking over Physio duties. He signed Ian Robins, Peter Fletcher and off-loaded players such as Kevin Johnson, Terry Gray and Bobby Campbell. The 1979–80 season proved to be the start of the revolution under Buxton where Town won the 4th Division Championship and scored 101 goals in the process. Buxton also won the Bell's Manager of the Year award for the Fourth Division. The following season Buxton set the club's then-record transfer fee of £110,000 for Terry Austin, but it was his first signing, Ian Robins, together with earlier acquisitions, Steve Kindon and Brian Stanton, who set the club alight, scoring a combined total of 41 goals as Town finished just outside the promotion places.

However, an injury-ravaged 1981–82 season brought about the premature retirements of Steve Kindon, Fred Robinson, Dick Taylor and Peter Fletcher. Buxton then managed promotion to the Second Division in 1983 by finished third in the league and gaining automatic promotion. Over the following seasons Town struggled due to lack of investment and after being unable to return to the Top Division, Buxton was sacked just before Christmas in 1986 with the team in 22nd place. Youth Coach Steve Smith came in as caretaker manager and went four games unbeaten in the league and following his fifth match he became the permanent manager and remains to this day, the only permanent Huddersfield Town manager to come from Huddersfield. Smith saved the club from relegation by three points that season. After 10 games without a win at the beginning of the 1987–88 season, Smith was sacked and replaced by former Fulham manager Malcolm Macdonald.

The 1987–88 season is statistically Town's worst-ever season and it included a 10–1 defeat at Manchester City on 7 November 1987. Town only managed six wins all season and was relegated back to the Division Three after conceding 100 goals. Macdonald was sacked and replaced by his assistant, former Republic of Ireland manager Eoin Hand. He was given the task of restoring the side to the second tier. Despite the prolific form of striker Craig Maskell, Town failed to achieve a Play-off berth in any of Hand's seasons in charge and Hand departed the club in 1992.

His replacement Ian Ross did better and, through the creative midfield partnership of Chris Marsden and loan signing Peter Butler and the goalscoring abilities of Iwan Roberts, steered the Terriers to a third-place finish and a Play-off meeting with 6th-placed Peterborough United, a tie Town were heavily favoured to win. Unfortunately for Town, the influential Butler widely credited with sparking Town's strong finish to the season, was ineligible to take part in the matches. Despite this setback, a 2–2 draw at London Road and an early goal at a packed Leeds Road put the Terriers within touching distance of Wembley. However, the players' anxiety clearly increased and The Posh struck twice in the second half to leave Town's hopes shattered. The devastating defeat affected the form of the side into the next season and it was only the late-season appointment of popular former boss Mick Buxton as Ross' assistant that kick-started the season.

== Moving to the McAlpine and on the Brink of Extinction (1993–2008) ==
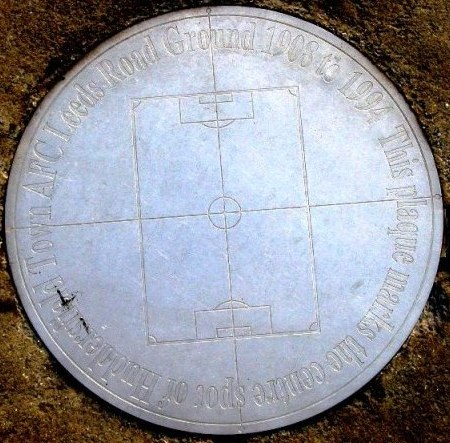
Former Leeds Road centre spot

Neil Warnock took over for the 1993–94 season, replacing Ross after the Terriers had made a remarkable escape from relegation to the basement division. He immediately secured the services of Reading's goalkeeper Steve Francis for the then-substantial sum of £150,000. Despite this outlay and a radical overhaul of the squad that saw the departures of fan favourites such as Chris Marsden and Iwan Roberts, the Terriers struggled for much of the season. In late 1993, Town paid Exeter City £70,000 for Ronnie Jepson who acquired the sobriquet Rocket Ronnie. Jepson initially failed to maintain the prolific form that earned him the move north.

However, a successful run in the Football League Trophy and a narrow aggregate victory over Carlisle United in the Northern Final earned a trip to Wembley to face Southern Section winners Swansea City. It would be Huddersfield's first Wembley appearance since 1938's FA Cup final defeat to Preston North End. The upcoming Wembley appearance boosted the Terriers' morale and young striker Andy Booth and some memorable performances from another fan favourite Phil Starbuck steered the club well clear of relegation with a strong finish to the league campaign. This came despite the team's 3–1 defeat on penalties to Swansea after a 1–1 draw in front of 27,000 Town fans.

Huddersfield Town played their 1,554th and final league game at the Leeds Road ground on 30 April 1994, beating Blackpool 2–1, watched by a near capacity crowd of 16,195. Huddersfield were still in the third tier of the English league when they moved from Leeds Road (now redeveloped into a retail park) into the new Alfred McAlpine Stadium (now called the John Smith's Stadium) for the 1994–95 season. During the first season at the new stadium, Huddersfield were promoted via the play-offs.

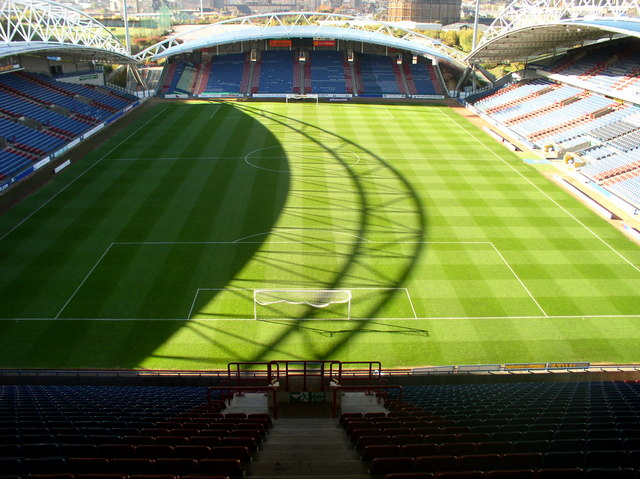
Alfred McAlpine Stadium (currently known as The John Smith's Stadium)

On 5 June 1995, Warnock left Huddersfield and Brian Horton was appointed as manager and an instant push to the Premier League was put on where the Terriers finished 8th in Division One (now the second tier after the introduction of Premier League in 1992). The following season was more of a struggle, with Town finishing 20th. Horton, along with Dennis Booth, David Moss and Les Chapman, was sacked in October 1997 with Huddersfield at the bottom of the table having not won a single league match. Former fans favourite Peter Jackson, who had played for the club between 1990 and 1994, was quickly given the job. Jacko had inherited an unfit Town team that had amassed 4 points from a possible 27 and were rooted to the bottom of the table without a win to their name. The rut didn't stop there and Jacko only managed one point from a possible 15. On 1 November, Huddersfield finally won in the 15th match of the season, by beating Stoke City at the McAlpine 3–1. Town's fortunes started to change with a 1–0 win against Manchester City at Maine Road which happened to be the 10th anniversary of the 10–1 loss in 1987. Three wins in four followed this game and lifted Town from 24th to 22nd in the table. Town climbed to 18th in the table, after a run of six games without defeat (including a 5–2 win away at Crewe and a 5–1 home win against Oxford United). However, Huddersfield went on a terrible run of form and lost five games in six and fell back down to 22nd in the table. Fortunately, another six-game unbeaten run which saw four wins lifted Town to 14th in the table and Town's Division One status was secured. Against all the odds, Jacko and Taff had saved Town from relegation in the Great Escape season.

The 1998–99 season saw Town hit the top spot and remained in the top two until October. They lost form but stayed around the play-off places for most of the season, however, Huddersfield went through a bad run after Christmas. In fact, Town had only three wins in 1999. Jacko steered Town to 10th place in the division. However, the new chairman sacked him because he didn't believe Jackson was a "big enough name" for his vision for the club.

A good start in 1999–2000 saw Town top the division at Christmas and results included a 7–1 hammering of Crystal Palace and went on a run of winning 9 games out of 10. However, Town went again on a poor form at Christmas this carried on into the Year 2000. Steve Bruce came under fire from the fans for travelling to Brazil to commentate on Manchester United games in the Intercontinental Cup when Town were going through a bad period. The sale of star-striker Marcus Stewart was met with outrage from supporters and were not impressed with his replacement Martin Smith. Town only finished in a disappointing eighth place at the end of the season. Town only won one game until December in the 2000–01 season. Bruce was sacked in October after a defeat against Grimsby Town which saw a bust-up between chairman Barry Rubery and Bruce in the tunnel after the game.

Bruce was replaced by European Scout Lou Macari. Town ended up being relegated back to the third tier under Macari, where an instant push for a quick return was put on, but Huddersfield lost 2–1 to Brentford in the play-offs meaning another year in the third tier. Macari was replaced by Southampton coach Mick Wadsworth.

The 2002–03 season was a total disaster. The club had no transfer budget, had debts of 20 million pounds and the players and staff went months without being paid. Crowds were at a record low and demonstrations against Wadsworth were common ground. He was finally sacked in January 2003, only to be reinstated because the club didn't have any money for his pay-off. A further agreement saw Mel Machin being brought in as an Advisor. Wadsworth was eventually sacked in March 2003 and replaced by Machin who oversaw relegation to the Third Division, whose weekly contract was not renewed at the end of the season.

Peter Jackson was appointed as manager before the start of the 2003–04 season, while there were doubts that the club would even survive. Ken Davy ended up buying the club and rescuing Town from extinction. Jackson only had eight professionals on the books at the beginning of the season, including Andy Booth, Nathan Clarke, Danny Schofield and John Thorrington. Jacko had to build a team full of free transfers and youngsters from the academy setup. The beginning of the season saw Town have to wait five league games before a win. Town had sat 19th before they beat Bristol Rovers 2–1 at home and this was the lowest Town had been in the Football League since 1979. Form continued to be hit and miss until a humiliating 4–0 defeat away at Macclesfield Town saw some Town fans begin to turn on Jacko. However, this sparked a run of six wins and a draw and from that game onwards, Town only lost four more games that season. By mid-April Town were three points away from gaining third place and automatic promotion. They first needed to beat Hull City at the KC Stadium but drew 0–0, they then needed to beat Mansfield Town at home but succumbed 3–1 in a sell-out crowd. This lead Town to the final game of the season where a win at Cheltenham Town would guarantee promotion. The game ended 1–1 and sent Huddersfield into the play-offs. After seeing off Lincoln City, Jacko ended up giving Huddersfield an instant return after beating Mansfield Town in the Play-off final.

The 2004–05 season was billed "The Young Guns" season which was focused around the former academy players who had made the step up to be professional footballers during the pre-season. The players were David Mirfin, Andy Holdsworth, Adnan Ahmed, Jon Worthington, John McAliskey and Nathan Clarke. Town had a mixed start to the season and at one point Town sat in 17th place, however, were never really in danger of getting relegated. In March, Town began a nine-game unbeaten run which saw the team win eight games and miss out on the play-offs by one point.

Town had finished strongly the season before and started the 2005–06 season well. They even topped the division after a five-match unbeaten run and from August Town didn't drop below the top six. Automatic promotion was starting to look likely until Town were drawn against Chelsea in the FA Cup 3rd Round and this coincided with bad form. Town ended up losing the tie 2–1 and the season never really recovered, but did manage to finish in the play-off positions where Town were knocked out by Barnsley.

After the play-off failure the previous season, Town were expected to at least reach the play-offs. Despite early promise, Town were pretty poor languishing in mid-table for most of the season. Assistant Manager Terry Yorath had to leave due to alcoholism and he was replaced by the inexperienced John Dungworth. A 5–1 defeat away to Nottingham Forest was the final nail in his coffin and Jackson was sacked after almost four years as Manager. Academy Manager Gerry Murphy took temporary charge of the team and managed a five-game unbeaten run which included four draws. He was replaced by the new permanent manager Andy Ritchie. Ritchie's reign was a pretty forgettable spell in Town's history although he did lead the Terriers to the 5th round of the FA Cup for the first time since 1997. Ritchie only lasted a year when he was sacked on 1 April 2008. Former Burnley manager Stan Ternent was appointed as the new Manager at the end of April 2008, an appointment which was met with large disappointment from the Town faithful who had wanted Martin Allen.

2008–09 was Town's Centenary Season and there was much excitement in pre-season and with £100 season tickets, as proposed by Chairman-Elect Dean Hoyle. Ternent oversaw a terrible start to the season and the crowds were hostile almost immediately. There were also rumours of dressing room unrest. Ternent stated that Town fans expected "champagne football on beer money". After winning only one more game, Ternent was sacked by Dean Hoyle at the beginning of November after only 15 league games in charge.

== On the up again; Premier League football (2008–present) ==
After Gerry Murphy and Graham Mitchell had taken temporary charge after Ternent's sacking, former Newcastle United and Fulham player Lee Clark was appointed as the Manager in December 2008. Clark steered Town to 9th place in the table. During his first full season Clark got Huddersfield to the play-offs but a very lacklustre performance away at Millwall saw Town get knocked out in the semi-finals, 2–0 on aggregate.

The 2010–11 season followed and saw a change in philosophy with Clark completely doing away with the fast attractive football from the previous season and bringing in a 4–5–1 formation which saw loanee Benik Afobe playing as a lone striker in the away matches. At one point Town looked certain for automatic promotion but dropped away near the end of the season and finished third in the table. However, this was followed by another play-off failure losing to Peterborough United at Old Trafford in the final. Dean Hoyle said that Town must get promoted as champions in 2011–12, however, Clark became fixated with an unbeaten record which had begun the season before and fans were annoyed at how many times Town had drawn from winning positions. The team eventually set a Football League record of 43 games unbeaten (not including their play-off final loss), which was previously set by Nottingham Forest. The run was ended by league leaders Charlton Athletic in the very next game after it was set.

After growing unrest amongst supporters and Clark's refusal to dismiss rumours of him taking over at Leicester City, Clark was sacked as manager of Huddersfield on 15 February 2012 following a 1–0 home defeat to Sheffield United. He was replaced by the former Leeds United manager, Simon Grayson. Although Town went through a bad run of form, they secured the play-offs. On 26 May 2012 Grayson led Town to the League One play-off final. The game finished 0–0 after extra time and a dramatic penalty shootout finished with Huddersfield victorious after 22 penalties with the score 8–7, promoting Huddersfield to the Championship.

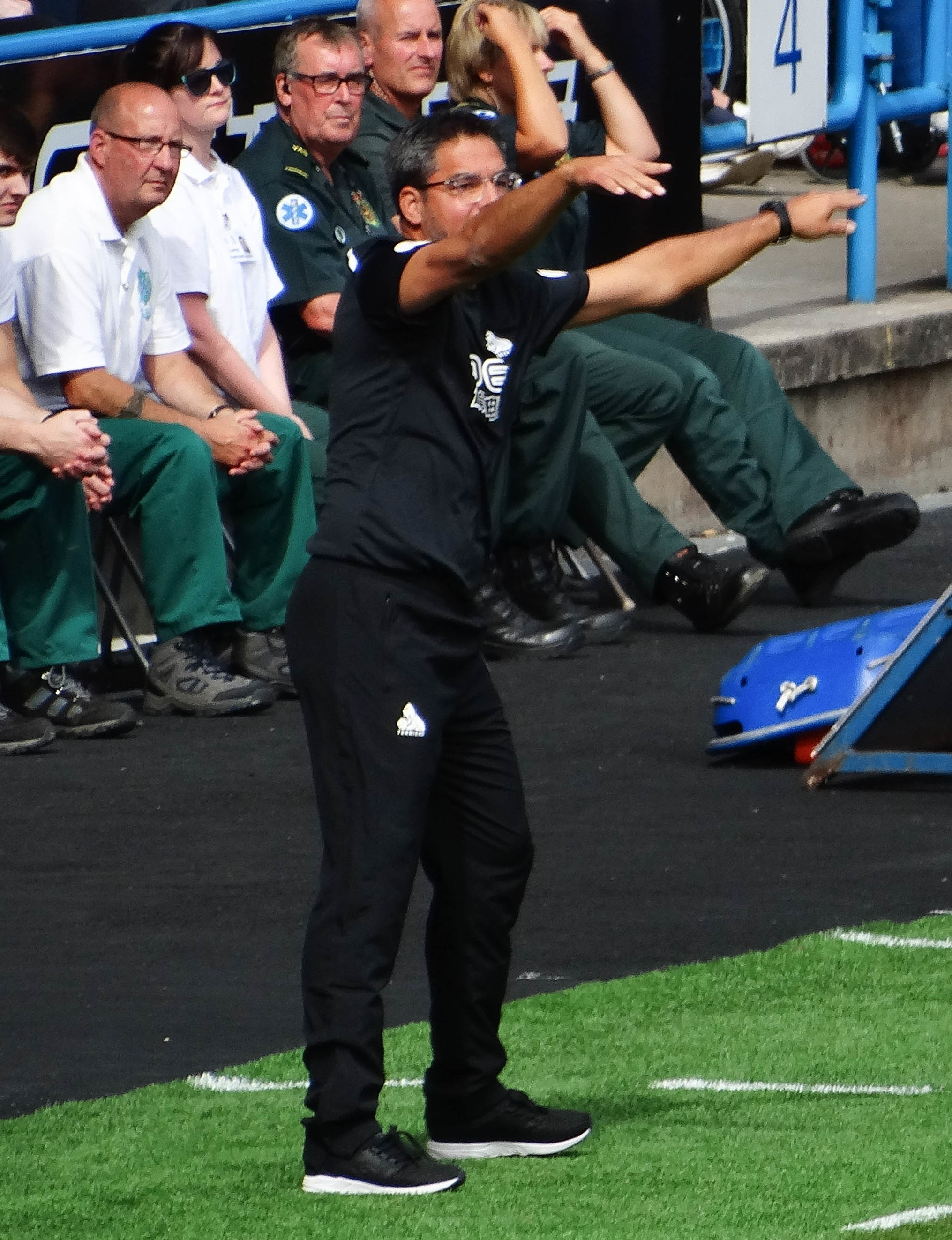
David Wagner

After a good start to the 2012–13 season, even topping the division, Town experienced a dreadful run of games and didn't win in 12 matches and this saw Grayson sacked in January 2013. Mark Lillis was placed in temporary charge and took charge of five games before Mark Robins was given the job in February 2013. Huddersfield survived relegation on the last day to finish 19th and then in the 2013–14 they again stayed up after finishing 17th. Mark Robins and Huddersfield Town parted company by mutual agreement after the first game of the 2014–15 season which was 4–0 home loss to Bournemouth, with Chris Powell taking over in September of the same year. In November 2015, Chris Powell was sacked and Mark Lillis was put in temporary charge for the upcoming local derby against Leeds United. By the time of the game, the new manager was revealed to be David Wagner, the former Borussia Dortmund II Manager who had turned down an offer from Liverpool to be Jürgen Klopp's Assistant to become the first foreign manager of Huddersfield Town. When he was appointed he said he wanted to play a style of play called Gegenpressing and also said he liked to see his teams play fast attractive football.

At the beginning of the 2016–17 season, Town were tipped to get relegated by many pundits. However, they pulled off a shock as they got promoted into the Premier League for the 2017–18 season through the EFL Championship play-offs after finishing fifth in the table. This meant a return to the top-flight for the first time since 1971–72. Being the favourites to be relegated at the start of the season, The Terriers defied the odds again, after they finished 16th and thus to stay up to play consecutive seasons in the Premier League. Steve Mounié was Town's top scorer with 7 league goals. The main highlight of the season was Town's memorable 2–1 home victory against Manchester United on 21 October 2017.

Town however failed to repeat the success from the previous season as they went on a ten match winless start to the season. It was only the 1–0 victory against Fulham on 5 November 2018 that recorded the first win of the season, and a first goal scored at home since the back end of last season.

Despite an upturn in November with Town at 15th, they soon slumped back to the bottom of the league with eight consecutive defeats all through December into early January. This terrible league form had prompted the season to be the worst for Town since the 1987/88 season.

Wagner left the club, however, by mutual consent on 14 January 2019 and was replaced by former Borussia Dortmund II manager Jan Siewert on a two-year deal. It took Siewert until late February to record his first win, 1–0 against Wolverhampton Wanderers on 25 February 2019.

Town's fate was sealed on 30 March 2019 with a 2–0 defeat at Crystal Palace (where Town won in their first ever game in the league the previous campaign), with just six games left to play and 19 points adrift of safety.

Due to a long fight with illness and unable to run with this rate, Dean Hoyle announced his resignation as chairman on 3 May 2019, and was to be replaced the next season by Phil Hodgkinson. A surprisingly strong finish to the season followed, with draws against Manchester United and Southampton which now sets the stage for what is to come with Siewert's plans as The Terriers return to the Championship.

== Notes ==
Preceded by (England) Tottenham Hotspur F.C.	FA Cup Winners; 1922	Succeeded by (England) Bolton Wanderers F.C.
Preceded by (England) Tottenham Hotspur F.C.	FA Charity Shield Winners; 1922	Succeeded by (England) Professionals XI
Preceded by (England) Liverpool F.C.	English Football League; 1923–24; 1924–25; 1925–26	Succeeded by (England) Newcastle United F.C.
