= 1924–25 Huddersfield Town A.F.C. season =

1924–25 season of Huddersfield Town

Huddersfield Town
1924–25 season
- Chairman: Joseph Barlow
- Manager: Herbert Chapman
- Stadium: Leeds Road
- Football League First Division: 1st (champions)
- FA Cup: First round (eliminated by Bolton Wanderers)
- Top goalscorer: League: Charlie Wilson (24); All: Charlie Wilson (24)
- Highest home attendance: 30,300 vs Burnley (26 December 1924)
- Lowest home attendance: 10,500 vs Leeds United (31 January 1925)
- Biggest win: 5–0 vs Arsenal (14 February 1925)
- Biggest defeat: 0–3 vs Bolton Wanderers (10 January 1925)

The 1924–25 Huddersfield Town season saw Town retain their title for the second consecutive season. Under the guidance of Herbert Chapman, they won the title by 2 clear points from West Bromwich Albion. The mood suddenly changed at the end of the season when Chapman suddenly resigned.

== Squad at the start of the season ==
Note: Flags indicate national team as defined under FIFA eligibility rules; some limited exceptions apply. Players may hold more than one non-FIFA nationality.

Pos.	Nation	Player
GK	ENG	Leonard Boot
GK	ENG	Ted Taylor
DF	ENG	Ned Barkas
DF	ENG	Harry Cawthorne
DF	ENG	Roy Goodall
DF	ENG	George Shaw
DF	ENG	Albert Smith
DF	ENG	Norman Smith
DF	SCO	David Steele
DF	ENG	Sam Wadsworth
DF	ENG	Billy Watson

Pos.	Nation	Player
DF	ENG	Tom Wilson
MF	ENG	Harry Dennis
MF	ENG	Ted Richardson
MF	ENG	Billy Smith
MF	ENG	Joe Walter
MF	ENG	Joey Williams
FW	ENG	George Brown
FW	ENG	George Cook
FW	ENG	Clem Stephenson
FW	ENG	Charlie Wilson

== Review ==
After winning their first title, Herbert Chapman's team didn't want to give their title back in a hurry, winning their first 4 games and being unbeaten for their 10 league games. Town's defensive line were particularly impressive, only conceding 28 goals during the league season and never conceded more than 2 in any league game. They only conceded 3 goals in their FA Cup game against Bolton Wanderers. They won their 2nd title by 2 points from West Bromwich Albion. However, Town were left bewildered when Herbert Chapman left for Arsenal at the end of the season.

== Squad at the end of the season ==
Note: Flags indicate national team as defined under FIFA eligibility rules; some limited exceptions apply. Players may hold more than one non-FIFA nationality.

Pos.	Nation	Player
GK	ENG	Leonard Boot
GK	ENG	Billy Mercer
GK	ENG	Ted Taylor
DF	ENG	Ned Barkas
DF	ENG	Harry Cawthorne
DF	ENG	Roy Goodall
DF	ENG	George Shaw
DF	ENG	Albert Smith
DF	ENG	Norman Smith
DF	SCO	David Steele
DF	ENG	Sam Wadsworth

Pos.	Nation	Player
DF	ENG	Billy Watson
DF	ENG	Tom Wilson
MF	ENG	Harry Dennis
MF	ENG	Billy Smith
MF	ENG	Joe Walter
MF	ENG	Joey Williams
FW	ENG	Sid Binks
FW	ENG	George Brown
FW	ENG	George Cook
FW	ENG	Clem Stephenson
FW	ENG	Charlie Wilson

== Results ==
=== Division One ===
Date	Opponents	Home/ Away	Result F - A	Scorers	Attendance	Position
30 August 1924	Newcastle United	A	3 - 1	Brown, C. Wilson, Stephenson	47,000	5th
2 September 1924	Nottingham Forest	H	3 - 0	C. Wilson (3)	13,500	2nd
6 September 1924	Sheffield United	H	2 - 1	C. Wilson, Brown	20,200	2nd
8 September 1924	Nottingham Forest	A	1 - 0	Cook	10,000	1st
13 September 1924	West Ham United	A	0 - 0		28,103	1st
20 September 1924	Blackburn Rovers	H	0 - 0		18,000	1st
27 September 1924	Leeds United	A	1 - 1	B. Smith	41,800	1st
4 October 1924	Aston Villa	A	1 - 1	Cook	43,000	1st
11 October 1924	Arsenal	H	4 - 0	B. Smith, Cook, C. Wilson, Brown	15,500	1st
18 October 1924	Manchester City	A	1 - 1	Brown	50,000	1st
25 October 1924	Birmingham	H	0 - 1		20,500	2nd
1 November 1924	West Bromwich Albion	A	0 - 1		15,683	5th
8 November 1924	Tottenham Hotspur	H	1 - 2	C. Wilson	18,500	9th
12 November 1924	Liverpool	A	3 - 2	B. Smith, Cook, C. Wilson	25,000	3rd
15 November 1924	Bolton Wanderers	A	0 - 1		35,000	5th
22 November 1924	Notts County	H	0 - 0		12,300	7th
29 November 1924	Everton	A	2 - 0	Cook, C. Wilson	27,500	5th
6 December 1924	Sunderland	H	4 - 0	C. Wilson (2), Stephenson, B. Smith	18,000	2nd
13 December 1924	Cardiff City	A	2 - 2	Cook (2)	27,500	4th
20 December 1924	Preston North End	H	1 - 0	C. Wilson	15,000	2nd
25 December 1924	Burnley	A	5 - 1	C. Wilson (4), Brown	26,332	2nd
26 December 1924	Burnley	H	2 - 0	B. Smith, Cook	30,300	2nd
27 December 1924	Newcastle United	H	0 - 0		13,500	2nd
3 January 1925	Sheffield United	A	1 - 1	B. Smith	28,500	2nd
17 January 1925	West Ham United	H	1 - 2	Cook	14,000	3rd
24 January 1925	Blackburn Rovers	A	3 - 2	Brown (2), Walter	12,000	3rd
31 January 1925	Leeds United	H	2 - 0	B. Smith, Brown	10,500	2nd
7 February 1925	Aston Villa	H	4 - 1	Brown (3), Stephenson	19,500	1st
14 February 1925	Arsenal	A	5 - 0	Brown, Stephenson, C. Wilson (3)	25,000	2nd
21 February 1925	Manchester City	H	1 - 1	B. Smith	19,300	1st
28 February 1925	Birmingham	A	1 - 0	Brown	12,000	1st
11 March 1925	West Bromwich Albion	H	1 - 1	Brown	15,400	1st
14 March 1925	Tottenham Hotspur	A	2 - 1	Stephenson, Brown	32,500	1st
21 March 1925	Bolton Wanderers	H	0 - 0		29,287	1st
4 April 1925	Everton	H	2 - 0	C. Wilson (2, 1 pen)	15,500	2nd
10 April 1925	Bury	A	1 - 0	B. Smith	31,772	1st
11 April 1925	Sunderland	A	1 - 1	Brown	35,000	1st
14 April 1925	Bury	H	2 - 0	Brown, C. Wilson	28,440	1st
18 April 1925	Cardiff City	H	0 - 0		15,500	1st
25 April 1925	Preston North End	A	4 - 1	C. Wilson, Brown (3)	12,634	1st
29 April 1925	Notts County	A	1 - 1	C. Wilson	8,000	1st
2 May 1925	Liverpool	H	1 - 1	Cawthrone	19,800	1st

=== FA Cup ===
Date	Round	Opponents	Home/ Away	Result F - A	Scorers	Attendance
10 January 1925	Round 1	Bolton Wanderers	A	0 - 3		50,412

== Appearances and goals ==
Name	Nationality	Position	League		FA Cup		Total	
Name	Nationality	Position	Apps	Goals	Apps	Goals	Apps	Goals
Ned Barkas	England	DF	1	0	0	0	1	0
Sid Binks	England	FW	2	0	0	0	2	0
Leonard Boot	England	GK	5	0	0	0	5	0
George Brown	England	FW	32	20	0	0	32	20
Harry Cawthorne	England	DF	2	1	0	0	2	1
George Cook	England	FW	25	9	1	0	26	9
Roy Goodall	England	DF	38	0	1	0	39	0
Billy Mercer	England	GK	27	0	1	0	28	0
Ted Richardson	England	MF	1	0	0	0	1	0
George Shaw	England	DF	11	0	0	0	11	0
Billy Smith	England	MF	41	9	1	0	42	9
Norman Smith	England	DF	1	0	0	0	1	0
Bon Spence	England	DF	4	0	0	0	4	0
David Steele	Scotland	DF	39	0	1	0	40	0
Clem Stephenson	England	FW	29	5	1	0	30	5
Ted Taylor	England	GK	10	0	0	0	10	0
Sam Wadsworth	England	DF	33	0	1	0	34	0
Joe Walter	England	MF	7	1	0	0	7	1
Billy Watson	England	DF	41	0	1	0	42	0
Joey Williams	England	MF	35	0	1	0	36	0
Charlie Wilson	England	FW	38	24	1	0	39	24
Tom Wilson	England	DF	40	0	1	0	41	0
