= 1922–23 Huddersfield Town A.F.C. season =

Huddersfield Town
1922–23 season
- Chairman: Joseph Barlow
- Manager: Herbert Chapman
- Stadium: Leeds Road
- Football League First Division: 3rd
- FA Cup: Third round (eliminated by Bolton Wanderers)
- Top goalscorer: League: Charlie Wilson (13); All: Charlie Wilson (16)
- Highest home attendance: 39,442 vs Bolton Wanderers (24 February 1923)
- Lowest home attendance: 6,300 vs Preston North End (21 March 1923)
- Biggest win: 4–0 vs Arsenal (23 December 1922); 4–0 vs Birmingham (26 December 1922)
- Biggest defeat: 0–2 vs Middlesbrough (2 September 1922); 1–3 vs Manchester City (23 September 1922); 0–2 vs Bolton Wanderers (14 October 1922); 0–2 vs Blackburn Rovers (4 November 1922); 3–5 vs Aston Villa (10 March 1923)
Home colours

Huddersfield Town's 1922–23 campaign saw Town finish in their highest position since their inception 15 years earlier. In only their third season in top-flight football, they finished in 3rd place behind Liverpool and Sunderland. This was another good season following on from their FA Cup triumph the previous season.

== Squad at the start of the season ==
Note: Flags indicate national team as defined under FIFA eligibility rules; some limited exceptions apply. Players may hold more than one non-FIFA nationality.

Pos.	Nation	Player
GK	ENG	Billy Cowell
GK	ENG	Ted Taylor
DF	ENG	Ned Barkas
DF	ENG	Harry Brough
DF	ENG	Harry Cawthorne
DF	ENG	Roy Goodall
DF	ENG	Charlie Slade
DF	ENG	Albert Smith
DF	SCO	David Steele
DF	ENG	Sam Wadsworth
DF	ENG	Billy Watson

Pos.	Nation	Player
DF	ENG	Tom Wilson
DF	ENG	James Wood
MF	ENG	Jack Byers
MF	SCO	Billy Johnston
MF	ENG	George Richardson
MF	ENG	Billy Smith
MF	ENG	Joe Walter
FW	ENG	George Brown
FW	ENG	Ernie Islip
FW	ENG	Frank Mann
FW	ENG	Clem Stephenson

== Review ==
Following the success at Stamford Bridge in the previous season's FA Cup Final, many were hoping that this newfound form would transfer itself into a successful league campaign and even a possible chance of the 1st Division title. However, Town had a bad start, only winning 2 of their first 10 games. So Herbert Chapman brought in Charlie Wilson from Tottenham Hotspur. His 13 goals helped Town mount a charge up the table along with the goals of Ernie Islip, Billy Smith and Frank Mann. They would eventually finish only 7 points behind defending champions Liverpool.

== Squad at the end of the season ==
Note: Flags indicate national team as defined under FIFA eligibility rules; some limited exceptions apply. Players may hold more than one non-FIFA nationality.

Pos.	Nation	Player
GK	ENG	Billy Cowell
GK	ENG	Ted Taylor
DF	ENG	Ned Barkas
DF	ENG	Harry Cawthorne
DF	ENG	Roy Goodall
DF	ENG	Tom Lilley
DF	ENG	Charlie Slade
DF	ENG	Albert Smith
DF	SCO	David Steele
DF	ENG	Sam Wadsworth

Pos.	Nation	Player
DF	ENG	Billy Watson
DF	ENG	Tom Wilson
MF	SCO	Billy Johnston
MF	ENG	George Richardson
MF	ENG	Billy Smith
MF	ENG	Joe Walter
FW	ENG	George Brown
FW	ENG	Ernie Islip
FW	ENG	Clem Stephenson
FW	ENG	Charlie Wilson

== Results ==
=== Division One ===
Date	Opponents	Home/ Away	Result F–A	Scorers	Attendance	Position
26 August 1922	Middlesbrough	A	2–2	Islip, B. Smith (pen)	20,000	9th
28 August 1922	Nottingham Forest	H	2–1	B. Smith, Islip	10,000	6th
2 September 1922	Middlesbrough	H	0–2		17,270	13th
4 September 1922	Nottingham Forest	A	1–0	Walter	14,000	7th
9 September 1922	Stoke	A	2–2	B. Smith (pen), Islip	22,000	7th
16 September 1922	Stoke	H	1–0	Mann	14,500	4th
23 September 1922	Manchester City	A	1–3	B. Smith	28,000	7th
30 September 1922	Manchester City	H	0–0		16,200	9th
7 October 1922	Bolton Wanderers	A	0–1		20,000	12th
14 October 1922	Bolton Wanderers	H	0–2		13,500	17th
21 October 1922	Oldham Athletic	A	3–0	Mann, Wadsworth (pen), B. Smith	16,826	12th
28 October 1922	Oldham Athletic	H	3–0	Mann, Walter, Islip	14,700	9th
4 November 1922	Blackburn Rovers	H	0–2		16,000	13th
11 November 1922	Blackburn Rovers	A	0–0		21,000	12th
18 November 1922	Cardiff City	H	1–0	C. Wilson	16,500	10th
25 November 1922	Cardiff City	A	1–0	Byers	25,000	7th
2 December 1922	Chelsea	A	2–2	Byers, C. Wilson	25,000	8th
9 December 1922	Chelsea	H	3–0	C. Wilson (2), Mann	15,500	5th
16 December 1922	Arsenal	A	1–1	Walter	25,000	5th
23 December 1922	Arsenal	H	4–0	Wadsworth (pen), Steele, Walter, Stephenson	10,000	5th
25 December 1922	Birmingham	A	0–0		20,000	5th
26 December 1922	Birmingham	H	4–0	C. Wilson (3), T. Wilson	27,900	3rd
30 December 1922	Everton	A	3–0	Mann (2), Byers	20,000	3rd
6 January 1923	Everton	H	1–0	C. Wilson	17,500	3rd
20 January 1923	Sunderland	A	1–1	Islip	30,000	3rd
27 January 1923	Sunderland	H	0–1		30,135	3rd
10 February 1923	Sheffield United	H	2–1	Islip, Mann	11,500	3rd
17 February 1923	Preston North End	A	0–1		15,000	3rd
3 March 1923	Aston Villa	A	1–2	Richardson	25,000	5th
10 March 1923	Aston Villa	H	3–5	Mann, Islip, C. Wilson	15,400	6th
17 March 1923	Burnley	H	2–0	C. Wilson, Brown	14,500	5th
21 March 1923	Preston North End	H	2–0	Islip, B. Smith	6,300	3rd
24 March 1923	Burnley	A	2–0	Basnett (og), Islip	9,100	3rd
31 March 1923	Newcastle United	H	2–0	Brown, B. Smith	16,500	3rd
2 April 1923	West Bromwich Albion	A	2–0	B. Smith, C. Wilson	24,291	3rd
3 April 1923	West Bromwich Albion	H	4–1	Islip, B. Smith, C. Wilson, Brown	25,096	3rd
7 April 1923	Newcastle United	A	0–1		20,000	3rd
9 April 1923	Sheffield United	A	2–0	Brown (2)	9,500	3rd
14 April 1923	Liverpool	H	0–0		17,600	3rd
21 April 1923	Liverpool	A	1–1	Brown	45,000	3rd
28 April 1923	Tottenham Hotspur	H	1–0	C. Wilson	15,000	3rd
5 May 1923	Tottenham Hotspur	A	0–0		18,500	3rd

=== FA Cup ===
Date	Round	Opponents	Home/ Away	Result F–A	Scorers	Attendance
13 January 1923	Round 1	Birmingham	H	2–1	Stephenson, C. Wilson	27,300
3 February 1923	Round 2	Millwall	A	0–0		39,700
7 February 1923	Round 2 Replay	Millwall	H	3–0	C. Wilson (2), Richardson	19,270
24 February 1923	Round 3	Bolton Wanderers	H	1–1	Islip	39,442
28 February 1923	Round 3 Replay	Bolton Wanderers	A	0–1		61,609

== Appearances and goals ==
Name	Nationality	Position	League		FA Cup		Total	
Name	Nationality	Position	Apps	Goals	Apps	Goals	Apps	Goals
Ned Barkas	England	DF	29	0	5	0	34	0
Harry Brough	England	DF	8	0	0	0	8	0
George Brown	England	FW	12	6	0	0	12	6
Jack Byers	England	MF	7	3	0	0	7	3
Harry Cawthorne	England	DF	6	0	0	0	6	0
Billy Cowell	England	GK	7	0	0	0	7	0
Roy Goodall	England	DF	1	0	0	0	1	0
Ernie Islip	England	FW	34	10	5	1	39	11
Billy Johnston	Scotland	FW	3	0	0	0	3	0
Tom Lilley	England	DF	3	0	0	0	3	0
Frank Mann	England	FW	27	8	5	0	32	8
George Richardson	England	MF	21	1	4	1	25	2
Charlie Slade	England	DF	6	0	0	0	6	0
Albert Smith	England	FW	3	0	0	0	3	0
Billy Smith	England	MF	35	9	5	0	40	9
David Steele	Scotland	DF	33	1	4	0	37	1
Clem Stephenson	England	FW	27	1	2	1	29	2
Ted Taylor	England	GK	35	0	5	0	40	0
Sam Wadsworth	England	DF	38	2	5	0	43	2
Joe Walter	England	MF	22	4	0	0	22	4
Billy Watson	England	DF	33	0	5	0	38	0
Charlie Wilson	England	FW	26	13	5	3	31	16
Tom Wilson	England	DF	39	1	5	0	44	1
James Wood	England	DF	7	0	0	0	7	0
