= 1925–26 Huddersfield Town A.F.C. season =

1925–26 season of Huddersfield Town

Huddersfield Town
1925–26 season
- Chairman: Joseph Barlow; Sir Amos Brook Hirst
- Manager: Cecil Potter
- Stadium: Leeds Road
- Football League First Division: 1st (champions)
- FA Cup: Fourth round (eliminated by Manchester City)
- Top goalscorer: League: George Brown (35); All: George Brown (35)
- Highest home attendance: 34,871 vs Blackburn Rovers (6 April 1926)
- Lowest home attendance: 7,285 vs Liverpool (25 November 1925)
- Biggest win: 5–0 vs Manchester United (13 March 1926)
- Biggest defeat: 1–6 vs Bolton Wanderers (12 December 1925)

The 1925–26 Huddersfield Town season saw Town become the first team in English football to achieve the hat-trick of 1st Division championships, a feat which as of the end of the 2022–23 season has not been surpassed.

Under the leadership of Cecil Potter, Town finished 5 points clear of Arsenal, now managed by Herbert Chapman.

== Squad at the start of the season ==
Note: Flags indicate national team as defined under FIFA eligibility rules; some limited exceptions apply. Players may hold more than one non-FIFA nationality.

Pos.	Nation	Player
GK	ENG	Billy Mercer
GK	ENG	Ted Taylor
DF	ENG	Ned Barkas
DF	ENG	Harry Cawthorne
DF	ENG	Roy Goodall
DF	ENG	George Shaw
DF	ENG	Albert Smith
DF	ENG	Bon Spence
DF	SCO	David Steele
DF	ENG	Sam Wadsworth
DF	ENG	Billy Watson
DF	ENG	Tom Wilson

Pos.	Nation	Player
MF	ENG	Harry Dennis
MF	SCO	Alex Jackson
MF	ENG	Jacky Slicer
MF	ENG	Billy Smith
MF	ENG	Joey Williams
FW	ENG	Sid Binks
FW	ENG	George Brown
FW	ENG	George Cook
FW	ENG	Harry Raw
FW	ENG	Clem Stephenson
FW	ENG	Charlie Wilson

== Review ==
Following the sudden resignation of Herbert Chapman, who joined Arsenal as their new manager, Town brought in Cecil Potter to steer the ship. Town continued their brilliant run of form with Charlie Wilson and George Brown being joined in the strikeforce department by Chapman's last signing Alex Jackson. Unfortunately injury cost Wilson his season and he moved to Stoke City by the end of the season. However, George Cook joined Jackson and Brown up front and between them scored 65 of Town's 92 league goals during the season.

They won their 3rd title with 2 games remaining after beating Bolton Wanderers 3–0 at Leeds Road with goals from Jackson, Billy Smith and Clem Stephenson. They finished 5 points clear of Chapman's Arsenal. That success was commemorated with a special trophy that has only been copied on 3 occasions for Arsenal, Liverpool and Manchester United.

== Squad at the end of the season ==
Note: Flags indicate national team as defined under FIFA eligibility rules; some limited exceptions apply. Players may hold more than one non-FIFA nationality.

Pos.	Nation	Player
GK	ENG	Billy Mercer
GK	ENG	Ted Taylor
DF	ENG	Ned Barkas
DF	ENG	Harry Cawthorne
DF	ENG	Roy Goodall
DF	ENG	George Hobson
DF	ENG	George Shaw
DF	ENG	Albert Smith
DF	ENG	Bon Spence
DF	SCO	David Steele
DF	ENG	Sam Wadsworth

Pos.	Nation	Player
DF	ENG	Billy Watson
DF	ENG	Tom Wilson
MF	ENG	Harry Dennis
MF	SCO	Alex Jackson
MF	ENG	Jacky Slicer
MF	ENG	Billy Smith
FW	ENG	George Brown
FW	ENG	George Cook
FW	SCO	William Devlin
FW	ENG	Harry Raw
FW	ENG	Clem Stephenson

== Results ==
=== Division One ===
Date	Opponents	Home/ Away	Result F - A	Scorers	Attendance	Position
29 August 1925	West Bromwich Albion	H	1 - 1	Williams	21,975	9th
5 September 1925	Sheffield United	A	3 - 2	C. Wilson, Jackson, Brown	23,013	8th
8 September 1925	Bury	H	2 - 1	Binks, Brown	11,933	5th
12 September 1925	Cardiff City	H	1 - 1	Stephenson	19,033	4th
16 September 1925	Birmingham	A	3 - 1	Cook (2), Brown	16,320	4th
19 September 1925	Tottenham Hotspur	A	5 - 5	Jackson (3), Cook, Brown	20,880	4th
26 September 1925	Manchester City	H	2 - 2	Cook, Williams	19,541	5th
3 October 1925	Everton	A	3 - 2	Brown (3)	35,665	3rd
10 October 1925	Burnley	H	2 - 1	Brown (2)	18,963	3rd
17 October 1925	Leeds United	A	4 - 0	Cook (2), Williams, Brown	33,008	2nd
24 October 1925	Newcastle United	H	0 - 1		18,285	4th
31 October 1925	Manchester United	A	1 - 1	Cook	37,213	3rd
14 November 1925	Aston Villa	A	0 - 3		33,401	7th
21 November 1925	Leicester City	H	3 - 0	Brown (2), Williams	14,386	6th
25 November 1925	Liverpool	H	0 - 0		7,285	5th
28 November 1925	West Ham United	A	3 - 2	Jackson (2), Brown	13,914	5th
5 December 1925	Arsenal	H	2 - 2	Jackson, Brown	22,115	4th
12 December 1925	Bolton Wanderers	A	1 - 6	Brown	25,823	4th
19 December 1925	Notts County	H	2 - 0	C. Wilson (pen), Brown	7,972	3rd
26 December 1925	Sunderland	H	1 - 1	Brown	27,136	3rd
28 December 1925	Birmingham	H	4 - 1	B. Smith, Stephenson, Brown, Jackson	16,565	3rd
1 January 1926	Blackburn Rovers	A	0 - 1			Match abandoned after 40 minutes due to waterlogged pitch.
2 January 1926	West Bromwich Albion	A	2 - 2	Williams, Brown	22,435	2nd
16 January 1926	Sheffield United	H	4 - 1	Goodall (pen), Cook, Brown, B. Smith	16,181	2nd
20 January 1926	Sunderland	A	1 - 4	Brown	27,833	3rd
23 January 1926	Cardiff City	A	2 - 1	Cook, Jackson	13,049	3rd
6 February 1926	Manchester City	A	5 - 1	Brown (3), Goodall (pen), B. Smith	36,645	1st
11 February 1926	Blackburn Rovers	A	1 - 2	Brown	21,434	2nd
13 February 1926	Everton	H	3 - 0	Brown (2), D. Raitt (og)	17,278	1st
20 February 1926	Burnley	A	1 - 1	B. Smith	21,482	1st
27 February 1926	Leeds United	H	3 - 1	Cook, Brown, Williams	26,248	1st
3 March 1926	Tottenham Hotspur	H	2 - 1	Brown (2)	13,005	1st
6 March 1926	Newcastle United	A	2 - 0	Brown (2)	56,496	1st
13 March 1926	Manchester United	H	5 - 0	Cook (2), Devlin (2), B. Smith	27,842	1st
20 March 1926	Liverpool	A	2 - 1	Devlin, Stephenson	35,255	1st
27 March 1926	Aston Villa	H	5 - 1	Jackson (2), Brown (2), Cook	28,442	1st
3 April 1926	Leicester City	A	0 - 2		29,903	1st
5 April 1926	Bury	A	0 - 0		27,144	1st
6 April 1926	Blackburn Rovers	H	3 - 1	Brown (2), A. Smith	34,871	1st
10 April 1926	West Ham United	H	2 - 1	Jackson (2)	21,116	1st
12 April 1926	Bolton Wanderers	H	3 - 0	B. Smith, Jackson, Stephenson	20,829	1st
17 April 1926	Arsenal	A	1 - 3	Devlin	34,110	1st
1 May 1926	Notts County	A	2 - 4	Cook, Jackson	4,715	1st

=== FA Cup ===
Date	Round	Opponents	Home/ Away	Result F - A	Scorers	Attendance
9 January 1926	Round 3	Charlton Athletic	A	1 - 0	Goodall (pen)	21,184
30 January 1926	Round 4	Manchester City	A	0 - 4		74,799

== Appearances and goals ==
Name	Nationality	Position	League		FA Cup		Total	
Name	Nationality	Position	Apps	Goals	Apps	Goals	Apps	Goals
Ned Barkas	England	DF	13	0	1	0	14	0
Sid Binks	England	FW	2	1	0	0	2	1
George Brown	England	FW	41	35	2	0	43	35
Harry Cawthorne	England	DF	24	0	2	0	26	0
George Cook	England	FW	29	14	1	0	30	14
Harry Dennis	England	MF	1	0	0	0	1	0
William Devlin	Scotland	FW	4	4	0	0	4	4
Roy Goodall	England	DF	29	2	1	1	30	3
George Hobson	England	DF	2	0	0	0	2	0
Alex Jackson	Scotland	FW	39	16	2	0	41	16
Billy Mercer	England	GK	13	0	0	0	13	0
Harry Raw	England	FW	2	0	0	0	2	0
George Shaw	England	DF	4	0	0	0	4	0
Albert Smith	England	FW	1	1	0	0	1	1
Billy Smith	England	MF	28	6	2	0	30	6
Bon Spence	England	DF	1	0	0	0	1	0
David Steele	Scotland	DF	18	0	0	0	18	0
Clem Stephenson	England	FW	36	4	2	0	38	4
Ted Taylor	England	GK	29	0	2	0	31	0
Sam Wadsworth	England	DF	38	0	2	0	40	0
Billy Watson	England	DF	40	0	2	0	42	0
Joey Williams	England	MF	23	6	1	0	24	6
Charlie Wilson	England	FW	4	2	0	0	4	2
Tom Wilson	England	DF	41	0	2	0	43	0
