= 1921–22 Huddersfield Town A.F.C. season =

Huddersfield Town
1921–22 season
- Chairman: Joseph Barlow
- Manager: Herbert Chapman
- Stadium: Leeds Road
- Football League First Division: 14th
- FA Cup: Winners
- FA Charity Shield: Winners
- Top goalscorer: League: Ernie Islip (11); All: Ernie Islip; Clem Stephenson (15)
- Highest home attendance: 45,691 vs Millwall (4 March 1922)
- Lowest home attendance: 8,000 vs West Bromwich Albion (14 January 1922)
- Biggest win: 6–0 vs Preston North End (22 April 1922)
- Biggest defeat: 1–5 vs Middlesbrough (11 March 1922); 0–4 vs Bradford City (1 April 1922); 2–6 vs Everton (14 April 1922)
Home colours

Huddersfield Town's 1921-22 campaign saw the club win their first trophy in their 14-year history. By beating Preston North End at Stamford Bridge, Town won the FA Cup for the first and only time. After an up-and-down season in the league, they finished in 14th place.

== Squad at the start of the season ==
Note: Flags indicate national team as defined under FIFA eligibility rules; some limited exceptions apply. Players may hold more than one non-FIFA nationality.

Pos.	Nation	Player
GK	ENG	Ted Davis
GK	SCO	Sandy Mutch
DF	ENG	Ned Barkas
DF	ENG	Harry Brough
DF	ENG	Harry Cawthorne
DF	SCO	Colin McKay
DF	ENG	Charlie Slade
DF	ENG	Sam Wadsworth
DF	ENG	Billy Watson
DF	ENG	Tom Wilson
DF	ENG	James Wood

Pos.	Nation	Player
MF	SCO	Billy Johnston
MF	ENG	Robert Jones
MF	ENG	George Richardson
MF	ENG	Billy Smith
FW	ENG	George Brown
FW	ENG	Ernie Islip
FW	ENG	Frank Mann
FW	ENG	Billy E. Smith
FW	ENG	Clem Stephenson
FW	ENG	Jack Swann

== Review ==
Following a disappointing showing in their first season in the top flight, Town were hoping for better fortunes in their second season. They beat Burnley on 3 December 1921 to rise to second place in the table. However, they won only three of their following 22 games, falling to 19th after a loss at Everton on 18 April 1922. Huddersfield then won their last three matches to finish on the same number of points—39—as the previous season, but three places higher in the table on 14th.

The season is fondly remembered by fans for the club's success in the FA Cup. After needing replays to beat Burnley, Brighton and Blackburn, they beat Millwall 3–0 in the fourth round, and Notts County 3–1 at Turf Moor in the semifinals, to reach their second final in three years. They played Preston North End in the final, just two days after beating them 6–0 in the league. Billy Smith (who along with Ernie Islip had scored a hat-trick in the 6–0 win) scored the only goal from a penalty, and Town won the cup for their first and only time.

Two week later, Huddersfield won the FA Charity Shield by defeating newly crowned league champions Liverpool 1–0 at Old Trafford with Tom Wilson scoring the winning goal.

== Squad at the end of the season ==
Note: Flags indicate national team as defined under FIFA eligibility rules; some limited exceptions apply. Players may hold more than one non-FIFA nationality.

Pos.	Nation	Player
GK	ENG	Ted Davis
GK	SCO	Sandy Mutch
DF	ENG	Ned Barkas
DF	ENG	Harry Brough
DF	ENG	Harry Cawthorne
DF	SCO	Colin McKay
DF	ENG	Charlie Slade
DF	ENG	Sam Wadsworth
DF	ENG	Billy Watson
DF	ENG	Tom Wilson
DF	ENG	James Wood
MF	ENG	Jack Byers

Pos.	Nation	Player
MF	SCO	Billy Johnston
MF	ENG	Robert Jones
MF	ENG	George Richardson
MF	ENG	Billy Smith
FW	ENG	George Brown
FW	ENG	Ernie Islip
FW	ENG	Frank Mann
FW	ENG	Len Marlow
FW	ENG	Stan Pearson
FW	ENG	Billy E. Smith
FW	ENG	Clem Stephenson

== Results ==
=== Division One ===
Date	Opponents	Home/ Away	Result F - A	Scorers	Attendance	Position
27 August 1921	Newcastle United	H	1 - 2	Swann	25,000	17th
29 August 1921	Sheffield United	A	1 - 1	Islip	22,500	17th
3 September 1921	Newcastle United	A	2 - 1	Jones, Wilson	50,000	11th
6 September 1921	Sheffield United	H	1 - 1	Islip	19,000	12th
10 September 1921	Sunderland	A	2 - 2	Stephenson, Richardson	30,000	11th
17 September 1921	Sunderland	H	1 - 2	Swann	19,000	18th
24 September 1921	Bolton Wanderers	A	1 - 3	Johnston	30,500	18th
1 October 1921	Bolton Wanderers	H	3 - 0	Islip, Swann, B. Smith	16,200	15th
8 October 1921	Birmingham	A	2 - 0	Womack (og), Mann	40,000	12th
15 October 1921	Birmingham	H	1 - 0	B. Smith	17,000	8th
22 October 1921	Arsenal	H	2 - 0	B. Smith, Johnston	10,000	7th
29 October 1921	Arsenal	A	3 - 1	Mann, McKay, Stephenson (pen)	30,000	5th
5 November 1921	Blackburn Rovers	H	3 - 0	Stephenson (2), Islip	14,000	4th
12 November 1921	Blackburn Rovers	A	0 - 2		24,000	6th
19 November 1921	Oldham Athletic	A	1 - 1	Islip	14,623	6th
26 November 1921	Oldham Athletic	H	1 - 0	Stephenson (pen)	16,500	4th
3 December 1921	Burnley	H	1 - 0	Islip	25,500	2nd
10 December 1921	Burnley	A	0 - 1		25,297	4th
17 December 1921	Cardiff City	A	0 - 0		25,000	5th
24 December 1921	Cardiff City	H	0 - 1		20,000	7th
26 December 1921	Manchester City	H	2 - 0	Stephenson (2, 1 pen)	30,000	5th
27 December 1921	Liverpool	A	0 - 2		40,000	6th
31 December 1921	West Bromwich Albion	A	2 - 3	Brown (2)	25,036	6th
2 January 1922	Manchester City	A	1 - 2	Brown	27,500	7th
14 January 1922	West Bromwich Albion	H	2 - 0	Brown, Reed (og)	8,000	7th
21 January 1922	Liverpool	H	0 - 1		19,000	8th
11 February 1922	Manchester United	A	1 - 1	Islip	30,000	10th
25 February 1922	Aston Villa	A	0 - 2		41,000	11th
27 February 1922	Manchester United	H	1 - 1	McBain (og)	30,000	11th
11 March 1922	Middlesbrough	A	1 - 5	B. Smith	26,000	14th
18 March 1922	Tottenham Hotspur	A	0 - 1		36,187	16th
27 March 1922	Tottenham Hotspur	H	1 - 1	Islip	16,000	16th
1 April 1922	Bradford City	A	0 - 4		29,000	16th
5 April 1922	Aston Villa	H	1 - 0	McKay	17,000	14th
8 April 1922	Bradford City	H	1 - 2	Mann	12,000	14th
10 April 1922	Chelsea	A	0 - 1		18,000	16th
14 April 1922	Everton	A	2 - 6	Wadsworth (pen), B. Smith	40,000	16th
15 April 1922	Preston North End	A	1 - 1	Byers	20,000	16th
18 April 1922	Everton	H	1 - 2	Mann	29,000	19th
22 April 1922	Preston North End	H	6 - 0	Islip (3), B. Smith (3)	12,500	16th
1 May 1922	Middlesbrough	H	2 - 1	Stephenson, Carr (og)	29,000	15th
6 May 1922	Chelsea	H	2 - 0	Stephenson, Mann	17,000	14th

==== Final League table ====
Pos	Team	Pld	W	D	L	GF	GA	GAv	Pts
12	Sunderland	42	16	8	18	60	62	0.968	40
13	West Bromwich Albion	42	15	10	17	51	63	0.810	40
14	Huddersfield Town	42	15	9	18	53	54	0.981	39
15	Blackburn Rovers	42	13	12	17	54	57	0.947	38
16	Preston North End	42	13	12	17	42	65	0.646	38

Source: World Football
Rules for classification: 1) Points; 2) Goal average; 3) Goals scored

=== FA Cup ===
Date	Round	Opponents	Home/ Away	Result F - A	Scorers	Attendance
7 January 1922	Round 1	Burnley	A	2 - 2	Islip, Watson	39,103
11 January 1922	Round 1 Replay	Burnley	H	3 - 2	Stephenson (2), Mann	35,355
28 January 1922	Round 2	Brighton & Hove Albion	A	0 - 0		22,241
1 February 1922	Round 2 Replay	Brighton & Hove Albion	H	2 - 0	Stephenson, Richardson	28,086
18 February 1922	Round 3	Blackburn Rovers	A	1 - 1	Mann	45,068
22 February 1922	Round 3 Replay	Blackburn Rovers	H	5 - 0	Mann, Islip (2), B. Smith (2)	31,899
4 March 1922	Round 4	Millwall	H	3 - 0	Stephenson (2), Islip	45,691
25 March 1922	Semi-Final	Notts County	N	3 - 1	Mann, B. Smith, Stephenson	46,323
29 April 1922	Final	Preston North End	N	1 - 0	B. Smith (pen)	53,710

=== 1922 FA Charity Shield ===
10 May 1922	Huddersfield Town	1 – 0	Liverpool	Old Trafford, Manchester
15:00 GMT	Wilson			Attendance: 20,000; Referee: ()

== Appearances and goals ==
Name	Nationality	Position	League		FA Cup		Total	
Name	Nationality	Position	Apps	Goals	Apps	Goals	Apps	Goals
Ned Barkas	England	DF	4	0	0	0	4	0
Harry Brough	England	DF	9	0	0	0	9	0
George Brown	England	FW	6	4	0	0	6	4
Jack Byers	England	MF	5	1	0	0	5	1
Harry Cawthorne	England	DF	5	0	0	0	5	0
Ted Davis	England	GK	27	0	7	0	34	0
Ernie Islip	England	FW	34	11	9	4	43	15
Billy Johnston	Scotland	FW	21	2	2	0	23	2
Robert Jones	England	MF	2	1	0	0	2	1
Frank Mann	England	FW	40	5	8	4	48	9
Len Marlow	England	FW	1	0	0	0	1	0
Colin McKay	Scotland	DF	14	2	0	0	14	2
Sandy Mutch	Scotland	GK	15	0	2	0	17	0
Stan Pearson	England	MF	1	0	1	0	2	0
George Richardson	England	MF	14	1	8	1	22	2
Charlie Slade	England	DF	25	0	9	0	34	0
Billy E. Smith	England	FW	1	0	0	0	1	0
Billy H. Smith	England	MF	40	8	9	4	49	12
Clem Stephenson	England	FW	39	9	9	6	48	15
Jack Swann	England	FW	9	3	0	0	9	3
Sam Wadsworth	England	DF	39	1	9	0	48	1
Billy Watson	England	DF	36	0	9	1	45	1
Tom Wilson	England	DF	39	1	9	0	48	1
James Wood	England	DF	36	0	9	0	45	0
