= List of Huddersfield Town A.F.C. records and statistics =

These are a list of player and club records for Huddersfield Town Association Football Club.

== Club records ==
=== Victories ===
- Record league victory: 10–1 v Blackpool, Division One, 13 December 1930
- Record FA Cup victory: 11–0 v Heckmondwike, preliminary round, 18 September 1909
- Record League Cup victory: 5–1 v Mansfield Town, first round, second leg, 13 September 1983

=== Defeats ===
- Record league defeat: 1–10 v Manchester City, Division Two, 7 November 1987
- Record FA Cup defeat: 0–6 v Sunderland, third round, 7 January 1950
- Record League Cup defeat: 0–5 v Arsenal, second round, first leg, 21 September 1993

=== Attendances ===
- Record attendance at Leeds Road: 67,037 v Arsenal, FA Cup Sixth Round, 27 February 1932
- Record attendance at John Smith's Stadium: 24,169 v Manchester United, Premier League, 21 October 2017

=== Sequences ===
- Longest unbeaten league run: 43 – 1 January 2011 to 28 November 2011. (Note: They lost in the 2011 Football League play-offs in the middle of this run, but the three play-off games were not counted as regular league games.)
- Longest unbeaten league run (in a single season): 25 – 1 January 2011 to 7 May 2011.
- Longest unbeaten home league run: 28 – 5 May 1982 to 17 September 1983.
- Longest unbeaten away league run: 22 – 1 January 2011 to 29 October 2011.
- Longest run of league wins: 11 – 5 April 1920 to 9 September 1920.
- Longest run of home league wins: 11 – 28 December 1925 to 30 August 1926.
- Longest run of away league wins: 6 – 12 March 2011 to 30 April 2011.
- Longest run of league defeats: 8 – 1 December 2018 to 2 January 2019.
- Longest run of home league defeats: 7 – 1 December 2018 to 9 February 2019 and 2 March 2019 to 26 April 2019.
- Longest run of away league defeats: 9 – 13 April 1912 to 16 November 1912, 14 November 1914 to 13 March 1915, 4 September 1946 to 7 December 1946 and 12 March 1988 to 3 October 1988.
- Longest run of league draws: 6 – 3 March 1987 to 3 April 1987.
- Longest run of home league draws: 6 – 3 May 1977 to 17 September 1977.
- Longest run of away league draws: 6 – 28 August 1926 to 23 October 1926.
- Longest run of league matches without a win: 22 – 27 November 1971 to 29 April 1972.
- Longest run of matches without a win: 19 – 26 August 2000 to 25 November 2000.
- Longest league scoring run: 27 – 12 March 2005 to 12 November 2005.
- Longest league home scoring run: 21 – 26 December 2004 to 10 October 2005.
- Longest league away scoring run: 24 – 20 January 1962 to 12 April 1963.
- Longest league non-scoring run: 7 – 22 January 1972 to 21 March 1972.
- Longest run of matches without conceding a goal: 8 – 13 March 1965 to 19 April 1965.
- Longest run of wins at the start of a season: 4 – 1924–25 season.
- Longest run of defeats at the start of a season: 6 – 1992–93 season.

=== Seasonal records ===
- Most wins in a season: 28 – 1919–20 season.
- Most home wins in a season: 16 – 1919–20 season, 1933–34 season, 1979–80 season and 2003–04 season.
- Most away wins in a season: 13 – 2010–11 season.
- Fewest wins in a season: 3 – 2018–19 season.
- Fewest home wins in a season: 2 – 2018–19 season.
- Fewest away wins in a season: 0 – 1936–37 season.
- Most defeats in a season: 28 – 1987–88 season and 2018–19 season.
- Most home defeats in a season: 14 – 2018–19 season.
- Most away defeats in a season: 17 – 1974–75 season.
- Fewest defeats in a season: 5 – 1924–25 season.
- Fewest home defeats in a season: 0 – 1982–83 season.
- Fewest away defeats in a season: 2 – 1924–25 season.
- Most draws in a season: 18 – 2011–12 season.
- Most home draws in a season: 9 – 1972–73 season, 1998–99 season and 2002–03 season.
- Most away draws in a season: 12 – 2011–12 season.
- Fewest draws in a season: 5 – 1937–38 season.
- Fewest home draws in a season: 1 – 1987–88 season.
- Fewest away draws in a season: 1 – 1911–12 season and 1988–89 season.

=== Tallies ===
- Most league goals scored in a season: 101 – 1979–80 season.
- Most home league goals scored in a season: 61 – 1979–80 season.
- Most away league goals scored in a season: 44 – 2011–12 season.
- Fewest league goals scored in a season: 22 – 2018–19 season.
- Fewest home league goals scored in a season: 10 – 2018–19 season.
- Fewest away league goals scored in a season: 12 – 2002–03 season and 2018–19 season.
- Most league goals conceded in a season: 100 – 1987–88 season.
- Most home league goals conceded in a season: 40 – 1950–51 season.
- Most away league goals conceded in a season: 62 – 1987–88 season.
- Fewest league goals conceded in a season: 28 – 1924–25 season.
- Fewest home league goals conceded in a season: 9 – 1923–24 season.
- Fewest away league goals conceded in a season: 17 – 1922–23 season.
- Most points (two points for a win): 66 – 1979–80 season.
- Most home points (two points for a win): 37 – 1979–80 season.
- Most away points (two points for a win): 30 – 1924–25 season.
- Fewest points (two points for a win): 25 – 1971–72 season.
- Fewest home points (two points for a win): 15 – 1971–72 season.
- Fewest away points (two points for a win): 7 – 1946–47 season and 1951–52 season.
- Most points (three points for a win): 87 – 2010–11 season.
- Most home points (three points for a win): 53 – 1982–83 season.
- Most away points (three points for a win): 43 – 2010–11 season.
- Fewest points (three points for a win): 16 – 2018–19 season.
- Fewest home points (three points for a win): 9 – 2018–19 season.
- Fewest away points (three points for a win): 7 – 2018–19 season.
- Most clean sheets: 23 – 1922–23 season.
- Most home clean sheets: 14 – 1980–81 season.
- Most away clean sheets: 10 – 1922–23 season and 1975–76 season.
- Fewest clean sheets: 5 – 2018–19 season.
- Fewest home clean sheets: 2 – 1950–51 season.
- Fewest away clean sheets: 0 – 1974–75 season.
- Most times failed to score: 23 – 1971–72 season.
- Most times failed to score at home: 12 – 1971–72 season.
- Most times failed to score away: 13 – 2002–03 season.
- Fewest times failed to score: 4 – 1930–21 season.
- Fewest times failed to score at home: 1 – 1927–28 season, 1930–31 season and 1931–32 season.
- Fewest times failed to score away: 2 – 1957–58 season.
- Most doubles (home & away wins against same opponent) for: 9 – 1919–20 season.
- Fewest doubles (home & away wins against same opponent) for: 0 – 1936–37 season, 1951–52 season, 1970–71 season, 1971–72 season, 1985–86 season and 1987–88 season.
- Most doubles (home & away wins against same opponent) against: 11 – 2018–19 season.
- Fewest doubles (home & away wins against same opponent) against: 0 – 1912–13 season, 1919–20 season, 1923–24 season, 1924–25 season, 1925–26 season, 1926–27 season, 1935–36 season, 1954–55 season, 1961–62 season, 1969–70 season, 1982–83 season, 2003–04 season and 2010–11 season.

== Player records ==
=== Appearances ===
The following players have played more than 250 league and cup appearances for Huddersfield Town. Statistics correct up to 1 April 2023.

	Name	Nation	Apps	Career
1	Billy Smith	England	574	1913–1934
2	Tom Wilson	England	500	1919–1932
3	Vic Metcalfe	England	459	1946–1958
4	Andy Booth	England	457	1991–1996 and 2001–2009
5	Roy Goodall	England	440	1923–1935
6	Malcolm Brown	England	403	1977–1983 and 1985–1989
7	Hugh Turner	England	394	1926–1937
8	David Cowling	England	392	1978–1988
9=	Bill McGarry	England	381	1950–1961
9=	Steve Smith	England	381	1964–1977 and 1981–1982
11	Kevin McHale	England	375	1956–1968
12	Les Massie	Scotland	363	1956–1967
13	John Coddington	England	356	1955–1967
14	Jonathan Hogg	England	331	2013–present
15	Eddie Boot	England	325	1937–1952
16	Billy Watson, Snr.	England	322	1912–1927
17	Jimmy Glazzard	England	321	1946–1956
18	Sam Wadsworth	England	312	1920–1930
19=	Graham Mitchell	England	310	1986–1995
19=	Jimmy Nicholson	Northern Ireland	310	1964–1974
21	Alf Young	England	309	1929–1939
22	Nathan Clarke	England	299	2001–2012
23	Steve Jenkins	Wales	295	1995–2003
24	Danny Schofield	England	289	1998–2008
25	Simon Trevitt	England	286	1986–1996
26	Dave Sutton	England	284	1977–1984
27	Ray Wilson	England	283	1955–1964
28	Geoff Hutt	England	277	1968–1976
29	Clem Stephenson	England	275	1920–1929
30	Alex Smithies	England	274	2007–2015
31	Phil Wilson	England	271	1981–1987
32	Ken Willingham	England	270	1932–1939
33=	Kevin Gray	England	269	1994–2002
33=	Ken Taylor	England	269	1953–1965
35	Jimmy Lawson	England	266	1968–1976
36	Roy Ellam	England	263	1966–1972 and 1974–1975
37	Andy Holdsworth	England	261	2003–2009
38	Jon Dyson	England	260	1992–2003
39	Reg Mountford	England	255	1929–1939
40	Sandy Mutch	Scotland	251	1910–1922

- Most appearances : 574 – Billy Smith.
- Most league appearances: 521 – Billy Smith.
- Most consecutive appearances : 259 – Malcolm Brown.
- Most consecutive league appearances : 226 – Malcolm Brown.
- Most consecutive FA Cup appearances : 52 – Tom Wilson.
- Most consecutive FL Cup appearances : 22 – Malcolm Brown.

=== Goals ===
The following players have scored more than 40 league and cup goals for Huddersfield Town. Statistics correct up to 29 December 2022.

	Name	Nation	League Goals	FA Cup Goals	FL Cup Goals	Other Goals	Total	Career
1	George Brown	England	142	17	0	0	159	1921–1929
2	Jimmy Glazzard	England	142	12	0	0	154	1946–1956
3	Andy Booth	England	133	5	4	8	150	1991–1996 and 2001–2009
4	Billy Smith	England	114	12	0	0	126	1913–1934
5	Les Massie	Scotland	100	6	2	0	108	1956–1966
6	Jordan Rhodes	Scotland	81	2	7	7	97	2009–2012 and 2021–present
7	Vic Metcalfe	England	87	3	0	0	90	1946–1958
8	Alex Jackson	Scotland	70	19	0	0	89	1925–1930
9	Frank Mann	England	68	7	0	0	75	1912–1923
10	Dave Mangnall	England	61	12	0	0	73	1929–1934
11	Derek Stokes	England	65	2	2	0	69	1960–1965
12=	Kevin McHale	England	60	5	3	0	68	1956–1967
12=	Iwan Roberts	Wales	50	4	6	8	68	1990–1993
14=	Ian Robins	England	59	5	3	0	67	1978–1982
14=	Marcus Stewart	England	58	2	7	0	67	1996–2000
16	Mark Lillis	England	56	4	3	0	63	1978–1985
17	Charlie Wilson	England	57	5	0	0	62	1922–1925
18	Alan Gowling	England	58	1	2	0	61	1972–1975
19	Craig Maskell	England	43	3	4	4	55	1988–1990
20	Brian Stanton	England	45	6	3	0	54	1979–1986
21=	Colin Dobson	England	50	0	2	0	52	1966–1970
21=	Ernie Islip	England	44	8	0	0	52	1913–1923
23	Paweł Abbott	Poland	48	1	2	0	51	2004–2007
24	Clem Stephenson	England	42	8	0	0	50	1921–1929
25	Nahki Wells	Bermuda	45	1	3	0	49	2014–2017
26=	David Cowling	England	43	2	3	0	48	1978–1987
26=	Duncan Shearer	Scotland	38	3	6	1	48	1986–1988
26=	Frank Worthington	England	41	5	2	0	48	1967–1972
29=	Charlie Luke	England	40	7	0	0	47	1931–1936
29=	Phil Starbuck	England	36	4	2	5	47	1991–1995
31=	Jimmy Lawson	England	42	4	0	0	46	1968–1976
31=	Alf Lythgoe	England	42	4	0	0	46	1934–1938
31=	George McLean	Scotland	43	3	0	0	46	1930–1934
31=	Danny Schofield	England	39	1	0	6	46	1998–2008
35=	Peter Fletcher	England	36	4	5	0	45	1978–1982
35=	Sammy Taylor	England	39	6	0	0	45	1919–1921
37	Tony Leighton	England	40	2	2	0	44	1965–1968
38=	Ronnie Jepson	England	36	3	2	1	42	1993–1996
38=	Bob Kelly	England	39	3	0	0	42	1927–1932
38=	Lee Novak	England	34	5	2	1	42	2009–2013
41	Terry Gray	England	36	2	3	0	41	1973–1979

- Most goals scored : 159 – George Brown.
- Most league goals: 142 – George Brown & Jimmy Glazzard.
- Most goals in a season: 42 – Sammy Taylor – 1919–20 season.
- Most league goals in a season: 36 – Jordan Rhodes – 2011–12 season.
- Most goals scored in a match: 5 – Dave Mangnall v Derby County – 21 November 1931, Alf Lythgoe v Blackburn Rovers – 13 April 1935 and Jordan Rhodes v Wycombe Wanderers – 6 January 2012.

=== Scoring records ===
These players have achieved the best consecutive scoring runs in the club's history.

- 11 matches – (England) Dave Mangnall – 2 January – 13 February 1932.
- 7 matches – (England) Jimmy Glazzard – 8 January – 23 February 1955.
- 7 matches – (England) George Brown – 27 December 1927 – 28 January 1928.
- 7 matches – (England) Sammy Taylor – 3–17 April 1920.
- 7 matches – (England) Walter Smith – 12 February – 12 March 1910.
- 6 matches – (Republic of Ireland) Anthony Pilkington – 5 October – 2 November 2010.
- 6 matches – (Poland) Paweł Abbott – 6–27 August 2005.
- 6 matches – (England) Jimmy Glazzard – 16 October – 20 November 1954.
- 6 matches – (England) George Brown – 23 October – 27 November 1926.

=== Transfers ===
- Highest transfer fee paid: £17,500,000 (€20 million) – Terence Kongolo, from Monaco, June 2018.
- Highest transfer fee received: £15 million~ – Philip Billing, to AFC Bournemouth, July 2019.

=== Youngest debutant ===
- Youngest player: 16 years, 229 days – Peter Hart v Southend United, 30 March 1974
