= Harry Dennis =

Harry Dennis may refer to:

- Harry Dennis (footballer) (born 1903), English professional footballer
- Harry Dennis (musician) (fl. 1970s–2020s), American house music producer and lyricist

== See also ==
- Harry Dénis (1896–1971), Dutch football defender
- Henry Dennis (disambiguation)
