= Stanley Pearson =

Stanley Pearson may refer to:

== Sport ==
- Stan Pearson (footballer, born 1888) (1888-?), English footballer
- Stan Pearson (1919-1997), English footballer
- Stanley Pearson, American tennis player, see 1922 U.S. National Championships – Men's singles
- Stanley Pearson (Black Bones), trainee chef at a Michelin star restaurant, ex semi professional footballer, local record holding bodybuilding champion, British local boy

== Fiction ==
- Stan Pearson, see List of This Is Us characters
