= Clem Stephenson =

English footballer & manager (1890–1961)

Personal information
- Full name: Clement Stephenson
- Date of birth: 6 February 1890
- Place of birth: Blyth, Northumberland, England
- Date of death: 24 October 1961 (aged 71)
- Place of death: Huddersfield, England
- Height: 5 ft 7 1/2 in (1.71 m)
- Position: Inside forward

Senior career*
Years	Team	Apps	(Gls)
1905	New Delaval Villa		
1906	West Stanley		
1907	Blyth Spartans		
1908	Durham City		
1910–1920	Aston Villa	192	(85)
1920–1929	Huddersfield Town	248	(42)
Total		440	(127)

International career
1924	England	1	(0)

Managerial career
- 1929–1942: Huddersfield Town
- * Club domestic league appearances and goals

Clement Stephenson (6 February 1890 – 24 October 1961) was an English footballer whose 20-year career at Aston Villa and Huddersfield Town included success in both the FA Cup and League Championship.

Stephenson's place in history as an inside forward was assured when Herbert Chapman targeted him as the man to lead Huddersfield Town's challenge for three consecutive Football League titles in the 1920s, he also made a single appearance for England in that period.

== Playing career ==
=== Aston Villa ===
Born in Blyth, Northumberland, Stephenson originally played for Aston Villa in 1910 as an inside forward. His career at Villa Park comprised 216 matches, in which he scored 85 goals. He was brought to Villa Park as Harry Hampton's career was nearing its end and soon acquired a reputation for intuitive play: his passes were said to be "as sweet as stolen kisses". His first silverware came in the 1913 FA Cup Final alongside Hampton and the England international Joe Bache in a victory over the League champions, Sunderland. Stephenson claimed before the 1913 FA Cup final to have dreamt that Villa would beat Sunderland with a headed goal from Tommy Barber. Villa did indeed win the final with a headed goal from Barber. Stephenson played in the semi-final the following year and was a winner in the FA Cup final in 1920 in his swansong for the club.

During the First World War, Stephenson had guested for Leeds City, managed by Herbert Chapman, who saw qualities beyond Stephenson's well-renowned lack of pace. As a result of making irregular payments to wartime guest players such as Stephenson, Charlie Buchan of Sunderland, Franny Walden of Tottenham Hotspur and Billy Hampson of Newcastle United, Chapman's career at Leeds City came to a questionable end and led to the dissolution of the club in 1919.

=== Huddersfield Town ===
However, when Chapman took over the reins at Huddersfield Town (in August 1920) one of his first tasks was to secure Stephenson in a £4,000 move from Villa Park. This caused controversy at a time and at a club where money was scarce but within two seasons, Stephenson was playing inside-left in the narrow FA Cup victory over Preston North End at Stamford Bridge becoming the first player in the 20th century to win three winners' medals in the FA Cup and eventually took the captain's armband from Tommy Wilson. The Final was notable for the controversy surrounding the penalty decision that decided that match when Hamilton brought down Huddersfield's W.H. Smith. Ivan Sharpe, writing in the Sunday Chronicle, stated: "It was certainly a close thing. I had a fairly good view of the incident and my impression was 'Penalty!' The kick was to be taken by the victim, Smith. The goalkeeper Mitchell decided on the manoeuvre of dervish leaps in the air while the act was brewing, the intention obviously to put the Huddersfield marksman off his shot. 'Ne'er mind the devil-dances' seemed to be the tenor of Town captain Clem Stephenson as he advised Smith: 'Just shove it in the net.'

In another two seasons Huddersfield had won the first of three consecutive League Championships and Chapman was moved to write to Stephenson: "I want to thank you personally for your play, your wholehearted efforts both on and off the field. I have never had such confidence in any captain of a team I have been associated with." It was later written: "Chapman bought perceptively, welded his assets together astutely and soon sent out one of the most successful League sides of all time. It was stubborn, disciplined and highly mobile with Clem Stephenson, once of Aston Villa, at the heart of everything. He was a stocky tactician without much pace but his passes were as sweet as stolen kisses."

Chapman brought in the free scoring George Brown and Alex Jackson and between 1924 and 1925 led the side to two consecutive League titles before departing for fame and fortune with Arsenal Without his guile the brio was gone and whereas Stephenson led Cecil Potter's team to a third straight League title in 1926 Huddersfield have never since won either the League Championship or the FA Cup instead finishing in second place in the League in 1927 and 1928 became the first side to have "Double Horror" and losing the 1928 FA Cup Final to Blackburn Rovers and finishing second to Everton by two points. They lost the semi-final to Bolton Wanderers the following year and Stephenson played his last game for the club that year, becoming manager in May 1929 taking over from Jack Chaplin.

== Managerial career ==
Stephenson went on to become Huddersfield's longest-serving manager from 27 May 1929 until 8 June 1942 overseeing club records:

- The record 10–1 victory over Blackpool in December 1930 at Leeds Road.
- The record attendance at Leeds Road 67,037 attended in the FA Cup quarter-final versus a Herbert Chapman led Arsenal.

But his League and Cup exploits were fraught with irony leading Huddersfield to second place in 1933–34 losing to Arsenal by 3 points in the season Herbert Chapman died, and reaching two FA Cup Finals and losing both: the first to a Herbert Chapman led Arsenal and the other to Preston North End in an exact reversal of the 1922 final, and the semi-final to Portsmouth the following year. Huddersfield have never reached the FA Cup semi-final since 1939.

== Playing statistics ==
Appearances and goals by club, season and competition
Club	Season	League			FA Cup		Total	
Club	Season	Division	Apps	Goals	Apps	Goals	Apps	Goals
Aston Villa	1910–11	First Division	5	3	0	0	5	3
Aston Villa	1911–12	First Division	20	10	0	0	20	10
Aston Villa	1912–13	First Division	34	14	6	5	40	19
Aston Villa	1913–14	First Division	36	12	5	2	41	14
Aston Villa	1914–15	First Division	37	10	2	1	39	12
Aston Villa	1919–20	First Division	39	27	6	2	45	29
Aston Villa	1920–21	First Division	21	8	5	1	26	9
Aston Villa	Total		192	84	26	11	218	95
Huddersfield Town	1920–21	First Division	9	1	—		9	1
Huddersfield Town	1921–22	First Division	39	9	9	6	48	15
Huddersfield Town	1922–23	First Division	27	1	2	1	29	2
Huddersfield Town	1923–24	First Division	40	11	3	1	43	12
Huddersfield Town	1924–25	First Division	29	5	1	0	30	5
Huddersfield Town	1925–26	First Division	36	4	2	0	38	4
Huddersfield Town	1926–27	First Division	25	5	1	0	26	5
Huddersfield Town	1927–28	First Division	31	2	8	0	39	2
Huddersfield Town	1928–29	First Division	12	4	0	0	12	4
Huddersfield Town	Total		248	44	26	8	274	52
Total								

== Honours ==
=== As a player ===
Aston Villa

- FA Cup: 1912–13, 1919–20

Huddersfield Town

- Football League First Division: 1923–24, 1924–25, 1925–26
- FA Cup: 1921–22; runner-up: 1927–28

=== As a manager ===
Huddersfield Town

- FA Cup runner-up: 1929–30, 1937–38
