= Henry Dennis (disambiguation) =

Henry Dennis was a hymnist.

Henry Dennis may also refer to:

- Henry Dennis (sheriff)
- Henry Dennis (industrialist) North Wales (1825–1906) Manager of Coal Mines and Railways, president of the Mining Institute

== See also ==
- Harry Dennis (disambiguation)
