= Robert Reuben Jones =

English footballer

Robert Jones
Personal information
- Full name: Robert Reuben Jones
- Date of birth: 1902
- Place of birth: Gateshead, England
- Height: 5 ft 5 in (1.65 m)
- Position: Outside forward

Senior career*
Years	Team	Apps	(Gls)
?–1921?	High Fell		
1921?–1922?	Huddersfield Town	2	(1)
- * Club domestic league appearances and goals

Robert Reuben Jones (born 1902 in Gateshead) was a former footballer who played as an outside forward. After playing for High Fell F.C. he joined Liverpool for the 1920 - 21 season, then Huddersfield Town for the 1921-22 season. He played two league games for the Terriers, scoring one goal.
