= Sam Wadsworth =

English footballer (1896–1961)

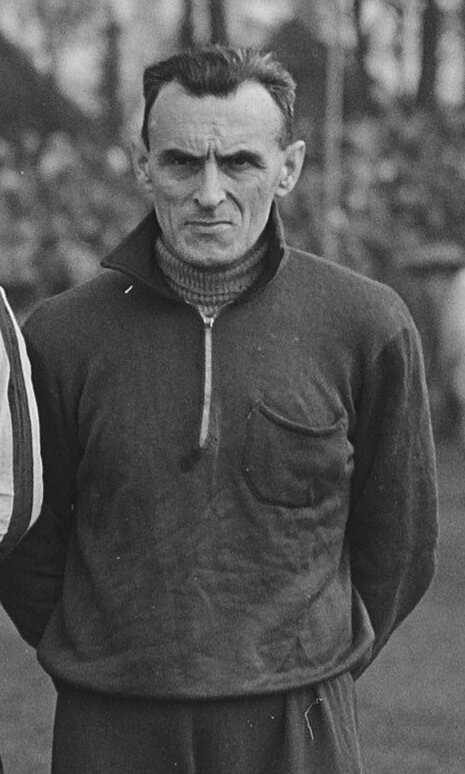
- Wadsworth (1951)

Personal information
- Full name: Samuel John Wadsworth
- Date of birth: 13 September 1896
- Place of birth: Darwen, England
- Date of death: 1 September 1961 (aged 64)
- Place of death: Eindhoven, Netherlands
- Height: 5 ft 7 1/2 in (1.71 m)
- Positions: Left back; centre half

Youth career
- St Cuthbert's
- –1912: Darwen Woodfold
- 1912–1914: Darwen

Senior career*
Years	Team	Apps	(Gls)
1914–1919	Blackburn Rovers	0	(0)
1920–1921	Nelson		
1921–1929	Huddersfield Town	281	(4)
1929–1930	Burnley	7	(0)
- Lytham

International career
1922–1926	England	9	(0)

Managerial career
- 1934–1935: DHC Delft
- 1935–1938: PSV
- 1938–1940: DWS
- 1945–1951: PSV
- 1951–1955: Brabantia
- 1956: BVC Amsterdam
- * Club domestic league appearances and goals

Samuel John Wadsworth (13 September 1896 – 1 September 1961) was an English professional footballer who played as a left back for Darwen, Blackburn Rovers, Nelson, Huddersfield Town, Burnley and Lytham. He won 9 England caps between April 1922 and October 1926 and was captain for his final four appearances. He later had a long career in management in the Netherlands.

== Personal life ==
Wadsworth was born in Darwen, the son of Clara Ellen Briggs and James Wadsworth. He was married to Harriet Elizabeth Woodward. Prior to the outbreak of the First World War, Wadsworth worked as a clerk. He ran a garage while a Blackburn Rovers player and the business later failed, which caused financial and health problems for his family. After his retirement from professional football in 1930, Wadsworth worked for the Lytham St. Annes Corporation's transport department.

== War service ==
During the First World War, Wadsworth lied about his age to enlist as a gunner in the Royal Garrison Artillery and received a shrapnel wound in the left ankle. His older brother Charles was killed in the war and "the atrocities left him physically and mentally scarred, suffering blackouts and grappling with post-traumatic stress".

== Career statistics ==
Appearances and goals by club, season and competition
Club	Season	League			FA Cup		Total	
Club	Season	Division	Apps	Goals	Apps	Goals	Apps	Goals
Huddersfield Town	1920–21	First Division	6	0	0	0	6	0
Huddersfield Town	1921–22	First Division	39	1	9	0	48	1
Huddersfield Town	1922–23	First Division	38	2	5	0	43	2
Huddersfield Town	1923–24	First Division	37	0	3	0	40	0
Huddersfield Town	1924–25	First Division	33	0	1	0	34	0
Huddersfield Town	1925–26	First Division	38	0	2	0	40	0
Huddersfield Town	1926–27	First Division	36	1	1	0	37	1
Huddersfield Town	1927–28	First Division	17	0	4	0	21	0
Huddersfield Town	1928–29	First Division	34	0	6	0	40	0
Huddersfield Town	1929–30	First Division	3	0	―		3	0
Career total			281	4	31	0	312	4

== Honours ==
Huddersfield Town

- Football League First Division: 1923–24, 1924–25, 1925–26
- FA Cup: 1921–22
- FA Charity Shield: 1922

Individual

- FA Charity Shield: 1923, 1924
