= Billy Cowell =

English footballer

Personal information
- Full name: William Cowell
- Date of birth: 7 December 1902
- Place of birth: Acomb, Hexham, Northumberland, England
- Height: 5 ft 10 1/2 in (1.79 m)
- Position: Goalkeeper

Senior career*
Years	Team	Apps	(Gls)
1922–1924	Huddersfield Town	9	(0)
- Hartlepool United
1926–1927	Derby County	1	
- * Club domestic league appearances and goals

William Cowell (born 7 December 1902) was a professional footballer, who played for Huddersfield Town, Hartlepool United and Derby County.
