= Stan Pearson (footballer, born 1888) =

English footballer

Personal information
- Full name: Stanley Pearson
- Date of birth: 1888
- Place of birth: Sheffield, England
- Date of death: Unknown
- Position: Midfielder

Senior career*
Years	Team	Apps	(Gls)
1921–1922	Huddersfield Town	1	(0)
- * Club domestic league appearances and goals

Stanley Pearson (born 1888) was a professional footballer, who played for Huddersfield Town.
