= Ted Richardson =

English footballer

Personal information
- Full name: George Edward Richardson
- Date of birth: 4 July 1902
- Place of birth: Easington, England
- Height: 5 ft 8 in (1.73 m)
- Position: Winger

Youth career
- Easington Colliery

Senior career*
Years	Team	Apps	(Gls)
1919–1922	South Shields	35	(4)
1922–1923	Newcastle United	2	(0)
1923–1924	Huddersfield Town	6	(0)
1924–1925	Sheffield Wednesday	9	(0)
1925	South Shields	0	(0)
1925–1926	York City		
1926–1928	Bradford City	50	(10)
1928	Easington Colliery		
1928–1929	Ashington	23	(5)
1929–????	Whitburn		
- * Club domestic league appearances and goals

George Edward Richardson (born 4 July 1902 in Easington, County Durham) was a professional footballer, who played for Newcastle United, Huddersfield Town, Sheffield Wednesday, York City and Bradford City.
