= Joe Walter (footballer) =

English footballer (1895–1995)

Personal information
- Full name: Joseph Dorville Walter
- Date of birth: 16 August 1895
- Place of birth: Eastville, Bristol, England
- Date of death: 23 May 1995 (aged 99)
- Place of death: Bristol, England
- Height: 5 ft 7 1/2 in (1.71 m)
- Positions: Half back; inside forward; outside forward

Youth career
- All Hallows
- Cliftonians

Senior career*
| Years | Team | Apps | (Gls) |
| 1914–1918 | Gloucestershire Regiment | | |
| 1918–1919 | Horfield United | | |
| 1919–1922 | Bristol Rovers | 117 | (8) |
| 1922–1925 | Huddersfield Town | 55 | (5) |
| 1925–1926 | Taunton United | 31 | (5) |
| 1926–1928 | Blackburn Rovers | 27 | (2) |
| 1928–1929 | Bristol Rovers | 7 | (1) |
| 1929–1931 | Bath City | | |
| 1931–? | Kingswood | | |
- * Club domestic league appearances and goals

Joseph Dorville Walter (16 August 1895 – 23 May 1995) was a professional footballer who played for Bristol Rovers, Huddersfield Town, Taunton United and Bath City. He was the last surviving player to play under Herbert Chapman while at Huddersfield.

Walter's early footballing experience came while serving in the Gloucestershire Regiment during the First World War, when he represented the Third Battalion of the Glorious Glosters, before joining Horfield United in the Horfield area of his home city of Bristol. After a year playing in the Bristol and Suburban Association Football League, he joined his first professional team in 1919 when he signed for Bristol Rovers.

Later in life he worked as a groundsman, firstly for the Bristol Co-Operative Society, before taking responsibility for Bristol City's Ashton Gate pitch in 1955. He was later appointed as an assistant coach at his former club, Bristol Rovers, in 1960 when he was aged 65.

In Huddersfield's final game at Leeds Road, against Blackpool on 30 April 1994, he was the guest of honour. He was also present for Town's visit to Bristol Rovers' Twerton Park.

== Death ==
On 23 May 1995, less than three months before what would have been his 100th birthday, Walter died in his sleep. His funeral was attended by the entire Huddersfield Town squad and their then manager Neil Warnock.

== Honours ==
Huddersfield Town

- First Division: 1923–24
