= Billy Johnston (footballer, born 1901) =

Scottish footballer

Personal information
- Full name: William Gifford Johnston
- Date of birth: 16 January 1901
- Place of birth: Edinburgh, Scotland
- Date of death: 1964 (aged 62–63)
- Height: 5 ft 8 in (1.73 m)
- Position: Inside forward

Senior career*
Years	Team	Apps	(Gls)
- Dalkeith Thistle
1919–1920	Selby Town		
1920–1924	Huddersfield Town	46	(6)
1924–1927	Stockport County		
1927–1929	Manchester United	48	(16)
1929–1931	Macclesfield Town	71	(41)
1931–1932	Manchester United	29	(11)
1932–1933	Oldham Athletic		
- Frickley
- * Club domestic league appearances and goals

William Gifford Johnston (16 January 1901 – 1964) was a Scottish professional footballer who played as an inside forward for Huddersfield Town, Stockport County, Manchester United, Macclesfield Town, Oldham Athletic and Frickley.

Johnston won the Football League First Division Championship with Huddersfield Town in 1923–24 (8 appearances in the campaign). He played for Manchester United in the First Division and returned in the 1931–32 season following their relegation to the Second Division, after two seasons at Macclesfield. In later years Johnston moved to Frickley, taking on the roles of manager and club secretary as well as player and played a large role in securing the future of the football club in 1936.
