= Harry Dennis (footballer) =

English footballer

Personal information
- Date of birth: 1903
- Place of birth: Romsey, Hampshire, England
- Position: Midfielder

Senior career*
Years	Team	Apps	(Gls)
- Newark Town
- Grantham Town
1925–1926	Huddersfield Town	1	(0)
- Southend United
- * Club domestic league appearances and goals

Harold T. Dennis (born 1903) was an English professional footballer who played as a defender for Newark Town, Grantham Town, Huddersfield Town and Southend United. He was born in Romsey, Hampshire.
