= David Steele (footballer) =

Scottish footballer and manager

Personal information
- Full name: David Morton Steele
- Date of birth: 29 June 1894
- Place of birth: Carluke, Scotland
- Date of death: 23 May 1964 (aged 69)
- Height: 5 ft 8 1/2 in (1.74 m)
- Position: Wing half

Senior career*
Years	Team	Apps	(Gls)
- Armadale
1913–1918	St Mirren	31	(4)
1914–1915	→ Abercorn (loan)	5	(1)
1918–1919	Douglas Water Thistle		
1919–1922	Bristol Rovers	70	(0)
1922–1929	Huddersfield Town	186	(1)
1929–1930	Preston North End		
1943	Bradford (Park Avenue)	3	(0)

International career
1923	Scotland	3	(0)

Managerial career
- 1936–1943: Bradford Park Avenue
- 1943–1947: Huddersfield Town
- 1948–1952: Bradford City
- * Club domestic league appearances and goals

David Morton Steele (29 June 1894 – 23 May 1964) was a Scottish professional footballer and manager.

== Playing career ==
Born in Carluke, Scotland, Steele was a wing half who started his football career as a part-timer first with Armadale then St Mirren while he worked as a miner before the First World War. After the war he moved to Scottish junior club Douglas Water Thistle.

In 1919, he joined then Southern League club Bristol Rovers playing for them during their first years in the league after they became members of the newly formed Division Three. Herbert Chapman signed Steele in a £2,500 deal to take him to Huddersfield Town in May 1922. Steele spent seven years at Huddersfield, winning a hat-trick of League Championships, two runners-up spot, an FA Cup runners-up medal in 1928, and three caps for Scotland. He joined Preston North End in May 1929 on a free transfer where he finished his playing days in July 1930.

== Managerial career ==
Steele began his managerial career when he worked at Bury as a coach. Similar roles followed at Danish side Bold Klubben F.C. and Sheffield United.

In 1931 he spent some months in Aalborg in northern Denmark as a coach and introduced the WM-formation in Denmark.

In May 1936, he was appointed Bradford Park Avenue manager. He spent six years at Park Avenue and even turned out as an emergency centre forward against Sheffield Wednesday in October 1942 scoring one goal. He resigned in 1943 to rejoin Huddersfield Town. In the club's first post-war season, Huddersfield finished just one place above the relegation positions in Division One and Steele resigned.

He was working on the family's fruit farm when Bradford City tempted him back into football in July 1948. He became the second man, after Peter O'Rourke to manage both Bradford league clubs. He won just one of his first 18 games in charge as City finished bottom of Division Three (North) in 1948–49. The following season City came 19th, before a 7th-place finish in 1950–51. Steele left in February 1952 with the club again struggling in the bottom half of the league. He returned to Huddersfield Town for a third time as a scout. His grandson, David Shaw played for Town in the 1970s. He also ran a pub in Stanningley. He died in May 1964 aged 69.

== Honours ==
=== Player ===
Huddersfield Town

- Football League First Division: 1923–24, 1924–25, 1925–26
- FA Cup runner-up: 1927–28
