= Albert Smith (footballer, born 1898) =

English footballer

Personal information
- Full name: Albert William Thomas Smith
- Date of birth: 22 April 1898
- Place of birth: Camberwell, England
- Height: 5 ft 9 in (1.75 m)
- Position: Defender

Senior career*
Years	Team	Apps	(Gls)
- Nunhead
1922–1926	Huddersfield Town	12	(1)
1926–1927	Bradford City	17	(5)
- * Club domestic league appearances and goals

Albert William Thomas Smith (born 22 April 1898) was a professional footballer, who played for Nunhead, Huddersfield Town and Bradford City. He was born in Camberwell, London.
