= Billy Smith (footballer, born 1895) =

English footballer (1895–1951)

Personal information
- Full name: William Henry Smith
- Date of birth: 23 May 1895
- Place of birth: Tantobie, England
- Date of death: 13 April 1951 (aged 55)
- Place of death: Huddersfield, England
- Height: 5 ft 10 in (1.78 m)
- Position: Outside left

Senior career*
Years	Team	Apps	(Gls)
1914–1934	Huddersfield Town	521	(126)
1934–1935	Rochdale		

International career
1922–1928	England	3	(0)

Managerial career
- 1934–1935: Rochdale (player-manager)
- * Club domestic league appearances and goals

William Henry Smith (23 May 1895 – 13 April 1951) was a professional footballer who played most of his career at Huddersfield Town.

He is one of Huddersfield's all-time top goal-scorers with 126 goals in his career between 1913 and 1934. Smith scored Huddersfield's winning goal in the 1922 FA Cup Final against Preston North End at Stamford Bridge. He also won three caps for England. He was also the first person in English football to score directly from a corner, in a match against Arsenal in October 1924. He made 574 appearances for the Terriers, scoring 126 goals.

== Career ==
For a Huddersfield legend, the story opened in an unlikely manner. It was September 1913 when at a board meeting a letter of W.H. Smith of Tantobie in County Durham was discussed. The content of the note was short and to the point for the writer made it clear he was not prepared to accept terms of less than 50/- a week (£2.50) and for that reason did not wish to present himself to further trials.

During a Division I match against Stoke he had a fight with a Stoke player. They were both sent off and it meant they would both miss a game. This caused Smith to miss the 1920 FA Cup Final against Aston Villa. After Huddersfield went on appeal he would miss the next league game. Huddersfield lost the cup final 1–0 as Billy Kirton scored in extra time.

In the 2nd half of the 1922 F.A. Cup final, Smith was brought down on the edge of the area. The referee pointed to the spot. Smith, shaken stepped up himself to take the penalty. Preston goalkeeper Mitchell jumped around on his line in attempt to distract Smith but Clem Stephenson said, "Never mind the dancing devil, just shove it in the net. Smith did."

Smith was a key member of the team that won a hattrick of First Division titles under Herbert Chapman and Cecil Potter and in the final championship year (in 1926) received his first England cap. He was one of five Huddersfield players who played in the "Wembley Wizards" 5–1 defeat of England. He, Bob Kelly, Roy Goodall and Tom Wilson played for England, and Alex Jackson for Scotland; Jackson scored a hat-trick, while Kelly scored a consolation for England in the 89th minute. On 11 November 1933 he received his fourth benefit from the president of the football league. He later had a small player - manager stint at Rochdale.

== Later life ==
Smith faded out from the game in the 1940s and died of cancer in 1951, after having his left leg amputated due to a mistreated football injury.

He and his son Conway Smith were the first father and son to score 100 goals each. His grandson Robert played in the last ever match at the Leeds Road ground before it was knocked down.

== Honours ==
Huddersfield Town

- Football League First Division: 1923–24, 1924–25, 1925–26
- FA Cup: 1921–22; runner-up: 1927–28, 1929–30
- FA Charity Shield: 1922

== Sources ==
"Huddersfield Town - 75 Years On. A book by George S. Binns."
