= Harry Cawthorne =

English footballer (1905–??)

Personal information
- Full name: Harold Cawthorne
- Date of birth: 7 March 1905
- Place of birth: Darnall, Sheffield, England
- Date of death: 1967
- Height: 5 ft 11 in (1.80 m)
- Position: Defender

Senior career*
Years	Team	Apps	(Gls)
1921–1926	Huddersfield Town	74	(2)
1927–1929	Sheffield United	28	(0)
- * Club domestic league appearances and goals

Harold Cawthorne (born 7 March 1905) was a professional footballer, who played for Huddersfield Town & Sheffield United.

== Honours ==
Huddersfield Town

- First Division (2): 1923–24, 1925–26
