= Ted Taylor (footballer) =

English footballer

Personal information
- Full name: Edward Taylor
- Date of birth: 8 February 1887
- Place of birth: Liverpool, England
- Date of death: 5 March 1966 (aged 79)
- Height: 5 ft 8 1/2 in (1.74 m)
- Position: Goalkeeper

Youth career
- Marlborough Old Boys (Liverpool)
- Liverpool Balmoral

Senior career*
Years	Team	Apps	(Gls)
1912–1922	Oldham Athletic	87	(0)
1922–1926	Huddersfield Town	119	(0)
1926–1928	Everton	40	(0)
1928–1929	Wrexham	25	(0)
Total		271	(0)

International career
1922–1926	England	8	(0)
- * Club domestic league appearances and goals

Edward Taylor (sometimes referred to as Edward Hallows Taylor; 8 February 1887 – 5 March 1966) was an England international footballer who played 8 games as a goalkeeper for his country.

== Honours ==
Huddersfield Town

- First Division (3): 1923–24, 1924–25, 1925–26
