= Ned Barkas =

English footballer and manager

Personal information
- Full name: Edward Barkas
- Date of birth: 21 November 1901
- Place of birth: Wardley, Gateshead, England
- Date of death: 24 April 1962 (aged 60)
- Place of death: Little Bromwich, Birmingham, England
- Height: 5 ft 9 in (1.75 m)
- Position: Full back

Youth career
- East Boldon
- Hebburn Colliery
- Bedlington United
- South Shields
- 1919–1920: Wardley Colliery

Senior career*
Years	Team	Apps	(Gls)
1920	Norwich City	1	(0)
1920–1921	Bedlington United		
1921–1928	Huddersfield Town	119	(4)
1928–1937	Birmingham	257	(9)
1937–1939	Chelsea	27	(0)
1939–1943	Solihull Town		
1943–19??	Wilmot Breeden		
- Nuffield Mechanics

Managerial career
- 1939–1943: Solihull Town (player-manager)
- * Club domestic league appearances and goals

Edward Barkas (21 November 1901 – 24 April 1962) was an English professional footballer who played as a full back. He played in the Football League First Division for Huddersfield Town, Birmingham and Chelsea.

Barkas was born in Wardley, County Durham. He won two league championship medals and a runners-up medal in the 1928 FA Cup Final with Huddersfield before becoming manager Leslie Knighton's first signing for Birmingham, where he made nearly 300 appearances and won another FA Cup runners-up medal, in 1931. On leaving Birmingham Barkas followed Knighton to Chelsea, returning to the Midlands on the outbreak of the Second World War.

Barkas came from a footballing family: his brother Sam played for and captained England, a cousin, Billy Felton, also played for England, and three other brothers Tommy, James and Harry were professional footballers. Another footballing cousin was David Davison.

Barkas died in Little Bromwich, Birmingham, at the age of 60.

== Honours ==
Huddersfield Town

- Football League First Division: 1923–24, 1924–25
- FA Cup runner-up: 1927–28

Birmingham

- FA Cup runner-up: 1930–31
