= Billy Watson (footballer, born 1893) =

English footballer

Personal information
- Full name: William Watson
- Date of birth: 31 December 1893
- Place of birth: Bolton on Dearne, England
- Date of death: 21 April 1962 (aged 68–69)
- Place of death: Sunderland, England
- Height: 5 ft 9 in (1.75 m)
- Position: Wing half

Senior career*
Years	Team	Apps	(Gls)
1911–1927	Huddersfield Town	292	(0)
- * Club domestic league appearances and goals

William Watson (31 December 1893 – 21 April 1962) was a professional footballer who played as a wing half for Huddersfield Town throughout his career from 1912 to 1927.

His sons Willie (died 23 April 2004 in South Africa) and Albert (died 2009 in Sunderland) were on Town's playing staff in later years.

Watson died on 21 April 1962 in Sunderland.

== Honours ==
Huddersfield Town

- Football League First Division: 1923–24, 1924–25, 1925–26
- FA Cup: 1921–22; runner-up: 1919–20
- FA Charity Shield: 1922
