= Roy Goodall =

English footballer and manager

Personal information
- Full name: Frederick Roy Goodall
- Date of birth: 31 December 1902
- Place of birth: Dronfield, England
- Date of death: 19 January 1982 (aged 79)
- Height: 6 ft 0 in (1.83 m)
- Position: Defender

Senior career*
| Years | Team | Apps | (Gls) |
| 1921–1937 | Huddersfield Town | 403 | (19) |

International career
| 1926–1933 | England | 25 | (0) |

Managerial career
- 1945–1949: Mansfield Town
- * Club domestic league appearances and goals

Frederick Roy Goodall (31 December 1902 – 19 January 1982) was a professional footballer, who played for Huddersfield Town for 16 years and played 25 games for England, 12 as captain.

He was captain of Huddersfield Town throughout their most successful period, when they became the first team to win the English top flight three times in a row and dominated English football through the twenties.

Goodall would have captained England in the first ever World Cup if they had decided to take a team to the tournament. He was widely regarded as one of the best defenders in the world at that time.

In 1945, he became manager of Mansfield Town.

== Honours ==
Huddersfield Town

- Football League First Division: 1923–24, 1924–25, 1925–26
- FA Charity Shield: 1922
- FA Cup runner-up: 1927–28, 1929–30
