= Tom Wilson (footballer, born 1896) =

English footballer

Personal information
- Full name: Thomas Wilson
- Date of birth: 16 April 1896
- Place of birth: Seaham, England
- Date of death: 2 February 1948 (aged 51)
- Place of death: Barnsley, England
- Height: 5 ft 10 in (1.78 m)
- Position: Centre back

Senior career*
Years	Team	Apps	(Gls)
1914–1915	Sunderland	8	(0)
1919–1931	Huddersfield Town	448	(4)
1931–1932	Blackpool	18	(0)
Total		474	(4)

International career
1928	England	1	(0)
- * Club domestic league appearances and goals

Thomas Wilson (16 April 1896 – 2 February 1948) was an English footballer who was a member of the Huddersfield Town team that won the Football League three times in the 1920s.

== Playing career ==
Born in Seaham, County Durham, England, Wilson started his professional career with Sunderland in 1914, before his career was interrupted by World War I. During the war, he turned out for the Seaham Colliery side, before joining Huddersfield in 1919.

Over the next 12 seasons, he was a virtual ever-present with Huddersfield, helping them to the Football League championship in 1923–24, 1924–25, and 1925–26, as well as victory in the FA Cup in 1922. In his time at Huddersfield, they also reached the FA Cup finals in 1920, 1928 and 1930. He was Huddersfield's captain throughout most of this period, before handing over to Clem Stephenson, later to be the club's manager. Wilson was known as the "Gentleman of football"; he also had the nickname of "The Dauntless Tommy Wilson" in the FA Cup Final 1930 against Arsenal. Wilson also had a waxwork figure of himself created for that final and was displayed in Madame Tussauds.

He made one England appearance in a 5–1 defeat by Scotland on 31 March 1928.

He left Huddersfield in 1931, having made 448 league appearances (4 goals) and another 52 appearances in FA Cup matches. He spent one season at Blackpool before retiring in 1932. He then returned to Huddersfield as assistant trainer. After World War II, he joined Barnsley as a trainer where he remained until his death in 1948 at the age of 51.

== Life outside football ==
Wilson had three sons: Thomas (Derek), Gordon and Neil.

== Honours ==
Huddersfield Town

- Football League First Division: 1923–24, 1924–25, 1925–26
- Football League Second Division runner-up: 1919–20
- FA Cup: 1921–22; runner-up: 1919–20, 1927–28, 1929–30
- FA Charity Shield: 1922
