= George Brown (footballer, born 1903) =

English footballer and manager

Personal information
- Date of birth: 22 June 1903
- Place of birth: Mickley, England
- Date of death: 10 June 1948 (aged 44)
- Place of death: Birmingham, England
- Height: 5 ft 9 in (1.75 m)
- Position: Striker

Youth career
- Mickley Colliery

Senior career*
Years	Team	Apps	(Gls)
1921–1929	Huddersfield Town	213	(142)
1929–1934	Aston Villa	116	(79)
1934–1935	Burnley	35	(24)
1935–1936	Leeds United	37	(19)
1936–1938	Darlington	44	(12)
Total		445	(276)

International career
1926–1932	England	9	(5)
	The Football League XI	3	

Managerial career
- 1936–1938: Darlington (player-manager)
- * Club domestic league appearances and goals

George Brown (22 June 1903 – 10 June 1948) was an English professional footballer and football manager, who played most of his career with Huddersfield Town. According to the RSSSF he scored more than 517 goals in 711 official matches.

== Playing career ==
A centre-forward, he was the highest ever goal-scorer for Huddersfield Town with 159 goals; 142 in the League in 213 appearances and 17 from 16 outings in the FA Cup. Signed straight from his pit team at Mickley in May 1921, he was eventually sold to Aston Villa in August 1929 for £5,000.

For Villa he scored a total of 89 goals in 126 games.

During his career he scored 276 goals in 445 league games, between 1921 and 1938, after which he retired to run a pub. He gained 9 full England caps and represented the Football League three times.

== Honours ==
=== As a player ===
Huddersfield Town

- Football League First Division: 1923–24, 1924–25, 1925–26
- FA Charity Shield: 1922
- FA Cup runner-up: 1927–28

== Managerial statistics ==
Team	Nat	From	To	Record				
Team	Nat	From	To	G	W	L	D	Win %
Darlington	(England)	October 1936	October 1938	90	23	45	22	25.6

== See also ==
- List of men's footballers with 500 or more goals
