= Leeds Road =

Football stadium in Huddersfield, England

Coordinates: 53°39′27.108″N 1°46′02.4276″W

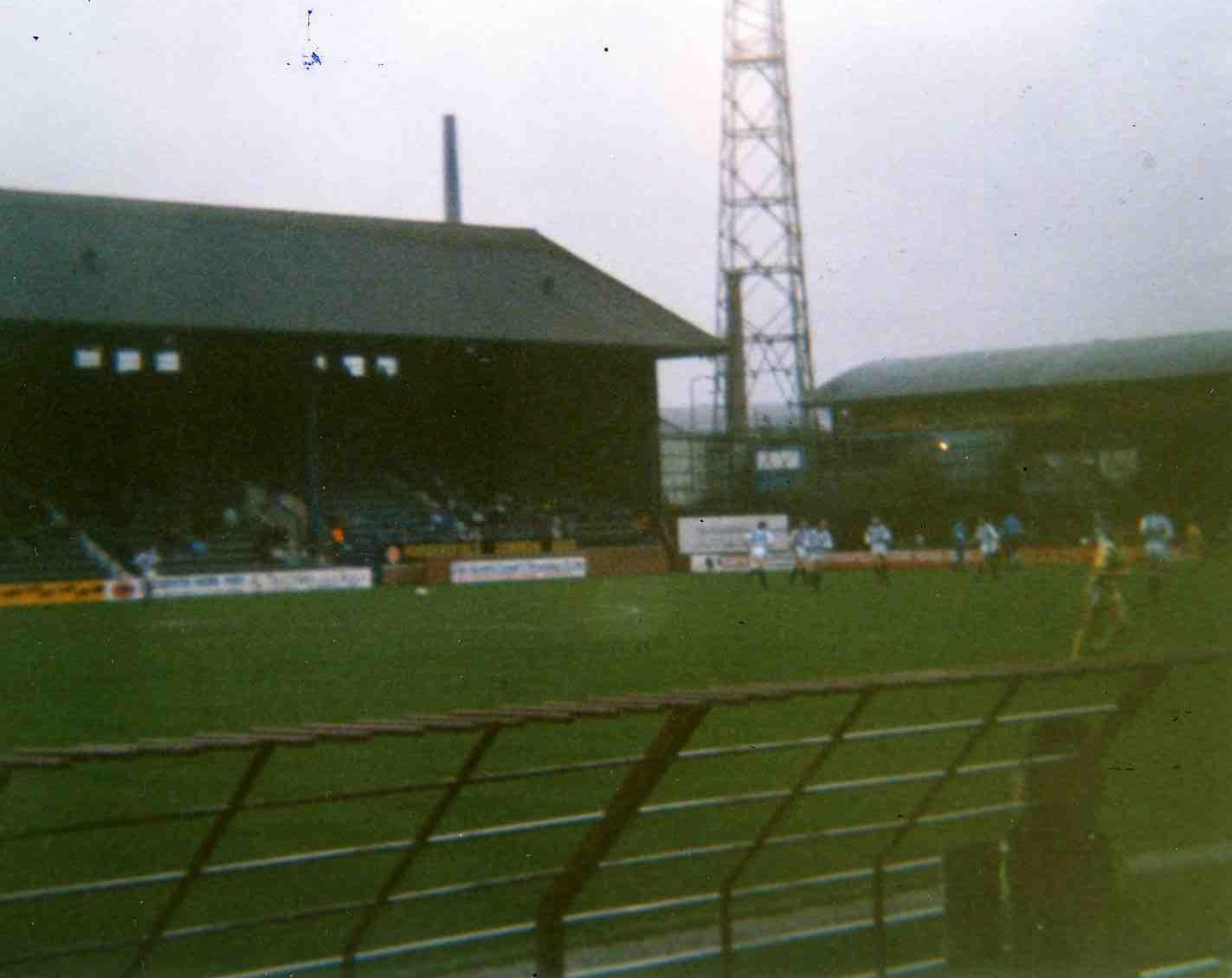
- Leeds Road in 1990
- Interactive map of Leeds Road
- Full name: Leeds Road
- Location: Leeds Road, Huddersfield, England
- Owner: Huddersfield Town A.F.C.
- Operator: Huddersfield Town A.F.C.
- Surface: Grass

Construction
- Opened: 1908
- Closed: 1994
- Architect: Archibald Leitch

Tenants
- Huddersfield Town A.F.C. (1908–1994); Huddersfield Giants (1992–1994); Bradford City (1985)

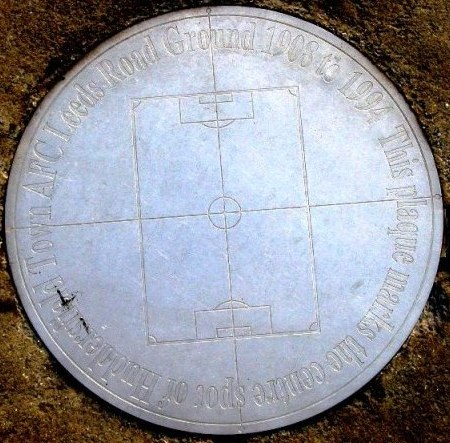
Former Leeds Road centre spot

Leeds Road was a football stadium in Huddersfield, England. It operated from its construction in 1908 until the Kirklees Stadium was opened nearby for the 1994–95 season. It was the home of Huddersfield Town A.F.C. from 1908 to 1994 and was also the base for Huddersfield RLFC from 1992 to 1994.

== History ==
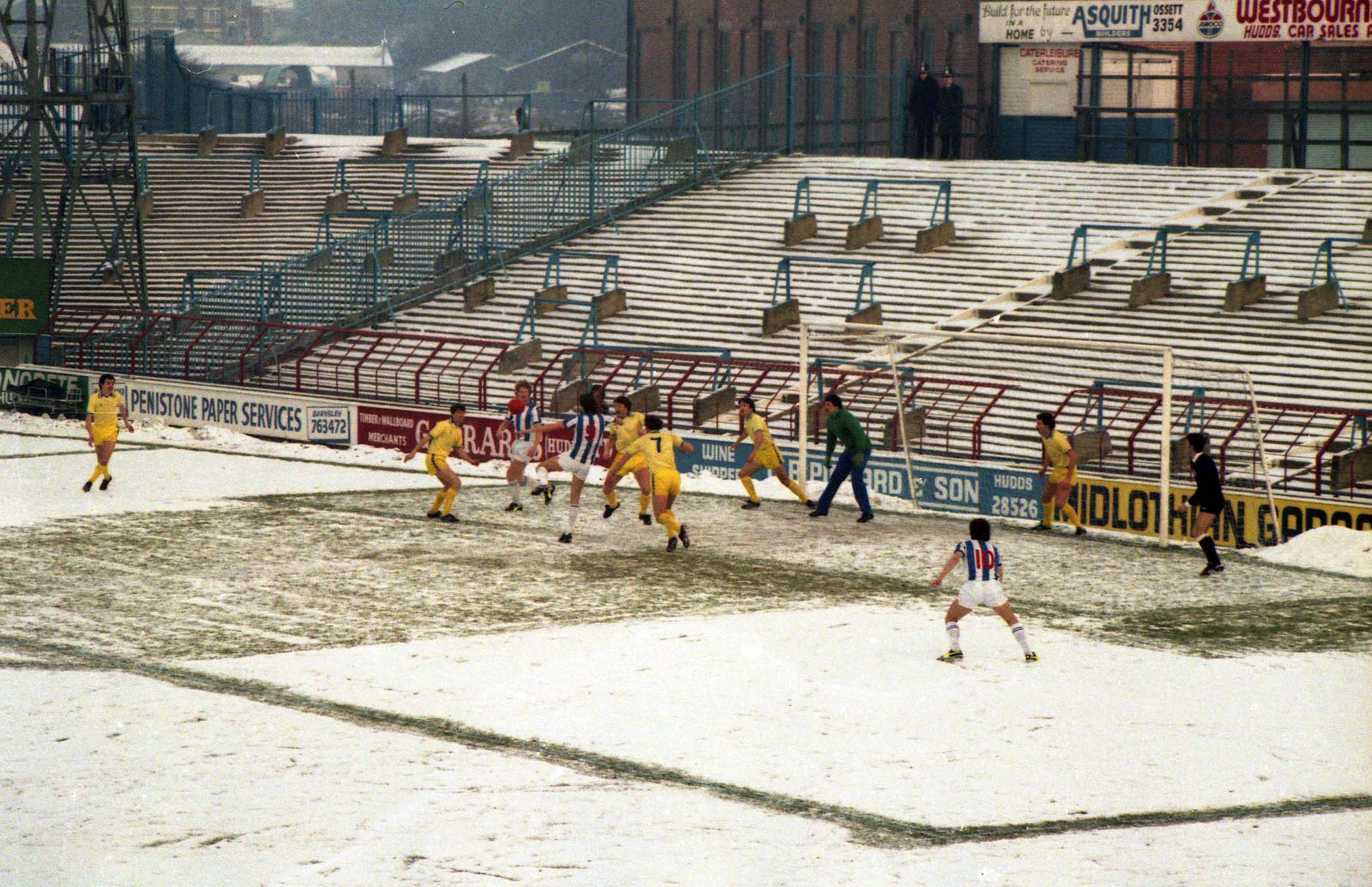
Huddersfield Town taking on Oxford United at Leeds Road in 1982.

The ground was opened in September 1908 with a friendly against Bradford Park Avenue.

The record attendance was 67,037 in a 1–0 FA Cup 6th Round defeat against Arsenal on 27 February 1932.

Bradford City also played six home games at Leeds Road during the 1985–86 season, while its Valley Parade home was rebuilt following the Bradford City stadium fire.

Manchester United also played a home match at Leeds Road in the 1948 FA Cup run while Old Trafford was being rebuilt following damage from German bombers in the Second World War. A single international match took place at the ground, when England defeated the Netherlands 8–2 in a friendly on 27 November 1946. This was England's second home international match after World War II, the first having been held at Maine Road, Manchester two weeks earlier.

In January 1990, the Taylor Report required all clubs in the top two divisions of English football to have an all-seater stadium by the 1994–95 season. Huddersfield were in the Third Division at this stage, but were aiming for promotion – finally achieving it in 1995. The club's board decided to replace Leeds Road with a new all-seater stadium at a different location, and quickly settled on a new site opposite the original stadium.

In 1991 the ground was the venue for Emley's first appearance in the FA Cup first round proper, a crowd of 9,035 is a club record for the village team from the hills outside Huddersfield, Bolton Wanderers won the game 3–0.

Huddersfield Town played their 1,554th and final League game at the Leeds Road ground on 30 April 1994, beating Blackpool 2–1, watched by a near capacity crowd of 16,195. Town's oldest-surviving ex-player, Joe Walter, was guest of honour at the match.

The ground was demolished soon afterwards and the site was redeveloped as a retail park. The point once occupied by the centre spot is now marked by a plaque in the car park, outside B&Q.

Meanwhile, Huddersfield moved to its new stadium – the Alfred McAlpine Stadium.
