= List of Huddersfield Town A.F.C. players =

The following is a list of Huddersfield Town A.F.C. players who have played in a first team game for Huddersfield Town.

== Full list of players ==
=== Current players ===
Correct as of 16 December 2024.

| Name | Nation | Career | League apps | League goals | FA Cup apps | FA Cup goals | League Cup apps | League Cup goals | FLT apps | FLT goals | Playoff apps | Playoff goals | Total apps | Total goals |
|---|---|---|---|---|---|---|---|---|---|---|---|---|---|---|
| Loick Ayina | Congo | 2021– | 0 (2) | 0 | 1 | 0 | 1 | 0 | 0 | 0 | 0 | 0 | 2 (2) | 0 |
| Jacob Chapman | Australia | 2019– | 13 (1) | 0 | 0 | 0 | 0 | 0 | 3 | 0 | 0 | 0 | 16 (1) | 0 |
| Rarmani Edmonds-Green | England | 2019– | 24 (10) | 2 | 0 | 0 | 1 (1) | 0 | 0 | 0 | 0 | 0 | 25 (11) | 2 |
| Kian Harratt | England | 2019– | 6 (16) | 2 | 0 (1) | 1 (2) | 1 | 0 | 0 | 0 | 0 | 0 | 7 (19) | 3 |
| Jaheim Headley | England | 2020– | 4 (2) | 1 | 0 | 0 | 0 | 0 | 0 | 0 | 0 | 0 | 4 (2) | 1 |
| Michał Helik | Poland | 2022– | 29 | 2 | 1 | 0 | 0 | 0 | 0 | 0 | 0 | 0 | 30 | 2 |
| Scott High | Scotland | 2019– | 21 (24) | 0 | 0 | 0 | 2 | 0 | 0 | 0 | 0 | 0 | 23 (24) | 0 |
| Jonathan Hogg | England | 2013– | 295 (12) | 4 | 10 (2) | 0 | 6 | 1 | 0 | 0 | 6 | 0 | 317 (14) | 5 |
| Kyle Hudlin | England | 2022– | 2 (7) | 0 | 0 | 0 | 0 (1) | 1 | 0 | 0 | 0 | 0 | 2 (8) | 1 |
| Joseph Hungbo | England | 2023– | 7 (3) | 1 | 0 | 0 | 0 | 0 | 0 | 0 | 0 | 0 | 7 (3) | 1 |
| Ben Jackson | England | 2019– | 13 (5) | 1 | 0 (1) | 0 | 1 (1) | 0 | 0 | 0 | 0 | 0 | 14 (7) | 1 |
| Pat Jones | Wales | 2020– | 0 (8) | 1 | 1 | 0 | 0 | 0 | 0 | 0 | 0 | 0 | 1 (8) | 1 |
| David Kasumu | Nigeria | 2022– | 20 (6) | 0 | 1 | 0 | 0 | 0 | 0 | 0 | 0 | 0 | 21 (6) | 0 |
| Josh Koroma | England | 2019– | 48 (25) | 14 | 2 (1) | 1 | 4 (1) | 0 | 0 | 0 | 0 | 0 | 54 (27) | 15 |
| Anthony Knockaert | France | 2023– | 2 (3) | 0 | 0 | 0 | 0 | 0 | 0 | 0 | 0 | 0 | 2 (3) | 0 |
| Tom Lees | England | 2021– | 74 (1) | 5 | 3 (1) | 1 | 2 | 1 | 0 | 0 | 3 | 0 | 82 (2) | 7 |
| Matthew Lowton | England | 2023– | 6 (2) | 0 | 1 | 0 | 0 | 0 | 0 | 0 | 0 | 0 | 7 (2) | 0 |
| Connor Mahoney | England | 2022– | 0 (9) | 0 | 0 | 0 | 1 | 0 | 0 | 0 | 0 | 0 | 1 (9) | 0 |
| Yuta Nakayama | Japan | 2022– | 13 (1) | 2 | 0 | 0 | 1 | 0 | 0 | 0 | 0 | 0 | 14 (1) | 2 |
| Lee Nicholls | England | 2021– | 68 | 0 | 0 | 0 | 3 | 0 | 0 | 0 | 3 | 0 | 74 | 0 |
| Charles Ondo | Equatorial Guinea | 2022– | 0 (2) | 0 | 0 | 0 | 0 | 0 | 0 | 0 | 0 | 0 | 0 (2) | 0 |
| Matty Pearson | England | 2021– | 47 (1) | 6 | 3 | 1 | 2 | 0 | 0 | 0 | 0 | 0 | 52 (1) | 7 |
| Kieran Phillips | England | 2020– | 0 (10) | 0 | 1 | 0 | 0 | 0 | 0 | 0 | 0 | 0 | 1 (10) | 0 |
| Jordan Rhodes (1st spell) | Scotland | 2009–2012 | 108 (16) | 73 | 6 (1) | 2 | 4 | 6 | 5 (1) | 4 | 6 (1) | 2 | 129 (19) | 87 |
| Jordan Rhodes (2nd spell) | Scotland | 2021– | 20 (33) | 8 | 2 (1) | 0 | 1 (1) | 1 | 0 | 0 | 0 (3) | 1 | 23 (38) | 10 |
| Aaron Rowe | England | 2019– | 12 (13) | 1 | 1 | 1 | 1 | 0 | 0 | 0 | 0 | 0 | 14 (13) | 2 |
| Michael Roxburgh | England | 2021– | 0 | 0 | 0 | 0 | 0 | 0 | 0 | 0 | 0 | 0 | 0 | 0 |
| Jack Rudoni | England | 2022– | 35 (4) | 0 | 1 | 0 | 0 (1) | 0 | 0 | 0 | 0 | 0 | 36 (5) | 0 |
| Josh Ruffels | England | 2021– | 25 (9) | 3 | 3 | 0 | 0 | 0 | 0 | 0 | 0 | 0 | 28 (9) | 3 |
| Ryan Schofield | England | 2018– | 32 (1) | 0 | 1 | 0 | 1 | 0 | 0 | 0 | 0 | 0 | 34 (1) | 0 |
| Tyreece Simpson | England | 2022– | 0 (8) | 0 | 1 | 0 | 0 | 0 | 0 | 0 | 0 | 0 | 1 (8) | 0 |
| Brodie Spencer | Northern Ireland | 2022– | 3 (1) | 0 | 0 | 0 | 1 | 0 | 0 | 0 | 0 | 0 | 4 (1) | 0 |
| Sorba Thomas | Wales | 2021– | 62 (11) | 3 | 3 (1) | 0 | 1 (2) | 0 | 0 | 0 | 1 (2) | 0 | 67 (16) | 3 |
| Ollie Turton | England | 2021– | 41 (17) | 0 | 0 (1) | 0 | 1 (1) | 0 | 0 | 0 | 1 | 0 | 43 (19) | 0 |
| Martyn Waghorn | England | 2023– | 7 (4) | 1 | 0 | 0 | 0 | 0 | 0 | 0 | 0 | 0 | 7 (4) | 0 |
| Danny C. Ward (1st spell) | England | 2011 | 5 (2) | 3 | 0 | 0 | 0 | 0 | 0 | 0 | 3 | 1 | 8 (2) | 4 |
| Danny C. Ward (2nd spell) | England | 2011–2015 | 77 (40) | 16 | 2 (1) | 0 | 4 (1) | 1 | 1 (1) | 0 | 3 | 0 | 87 (43) | 17 |
| Danny C. Ward (3rd spell) | England | 2020– | 65 (24) | 19 | 0 (3) | 0 | 2 | 0 | 0 | 0 | 3 | 0 | 70 (27) | 19 |

=== Former players ===
| Name | Nation | Career | League apps | League goals | FA Cup apps | FA Cup goals | League Cup apps | League Cup goals | FLT apps | FLT goals | Playoff apps | Playoff goals | Total apps | Total goals |
|---|---|---|---|---|---|---|---|---|---|---|---|---|---|---|
| Rolando Aarons | Jamaica | 2021–2023 | 5 (6) | 0 | 0 (1) | 0 | 0 | 0 | 0 | 0 | 0 | 0 | 5 (7) | 0 |
| Pawel Abbott | Poland | 2004–2007 | 82 (29) | 48 | 2 (2) | 1 | 4 | 2 | 2 (1) | 0 | 1 (3) | 0 | 91 (35) | 51 |
| Danny Adams | England | 2005–2007 | 68 | 0 | 3 | 0 | 3 | 0 | 1 | 0 | 2 | 0 | 77 | 0 |
| Benik Afobe | DR Congo | 2010–2011 | 14 (14) | 5 | 3 | 1 | 0 | 0 | 1 | 2 | 3 | 0 | 21 (14) | 8 |
| Adnan Ahmed | Pakistan | 2004–2007 | 24 (17) | 1 | 1 | 0 | 0 | 0 | 1 (2) | 1 | 0 | 0 | 26 (19) | 2 |
| Paul Aimson | England | 1968–1969 | 34 (4) | 13 | 2 | 0 | 2 | 0 | 0 | 0 | 0 | 0 | 38 (4) | 13 |
| Lionel Ainsworth | England | 2009–2010 | 9 (16) | 0 | 1 (1) | 0 | 0 (2) | 0 | 1 (1) | 0 | 0 | 0 | 11 (20) | 0 |
| Lucas Akins | England | 2007–2008 | 0 (5) | 0 | 0 | 0 | 0 | 0 | 0 (1) | 0 | 0 | 0 | 0 (6) | 0 |
| Sam Allardyce | England | 1984–1985 | 37 | 0 | 3 | 0 | 2 | 0 | 0 | 0 | 0 | 0 | 42 | 0 |
| Jimmy Allen | England | 1934–1935 | 1 | 0 | 0 | 0 | 0 | 0 | 0 | 0 | 0 | 0 | 1 | 0 |
| Lloyd Allinson | England | 2010–2016 | 0 (1) | 0 | 0 | 0 | 0 | 0 | 0 | 0 | 0 | 0 | 0 (1) | 0 |
| Wayne Allison | England | 1997–1999 | 71 (3) | 15 | 6 | 2 | 3 (1) | 2 | 0 | 0 | 0 | 0 | 80 (4) | 19 |
| George Anderson | Scotland | 1934–1935 | 14 | 4 | 0 | 0 | 0 | 0 | 0 | 0 | 0 | 0 | 14 | 4 |
| Tino Anjorin | England | 2022; 2022–2023 | 6 (9) | 3 | 0 (1) | 0 | 0 (1) | 0 | 0 | 0 | 0 | 0 | 6 (11) | 3 |
| John Archer | England | 1968–1969 | 7 (2) | 0 | 0 | 0 | 0 | 0 | 0 | 0 | 0 | 0 | 7 (2) | 0 |
| Scott Arfield | Canada | 2010–2013 | 66 (30) | 7 | 6 (4) | 1 | 3 (1) | 0 | 4 (1) | 1 | 3 (1) | 0 | 81 (37) | 9 |
| Diego Arismendi | Uruguay | 2012 | 7 (2) | 0 | 0 | 0 | 0 | 0 | 0 | 0 | 0 | 0 | 7 (2) | 0 |
| Andrew Armour | Scotland | 1911–1914 | 93 | 7 | 5 | 1 | 0 | 0 | 0 | 0 | 0 | 0 | 98 | 8 |
| Alun Armstrong | England | 2000 | 4 (3) | 0 | 0 | 0 | 0 | 0 | 0 | 0 | 0 | 0 | 4 (3) | 0 |
| Craig Armstrong | England | 1999–2002 | 101 (6) | 5 | 2 | 0 | 7 (1) | 0 | 1 (1) | 0 | 0 | 0 | 111 (8) | 5 |
| Terry Armstrong | England | 1976–1981 | 36 (4) | 2 | 0 | 0 | 0 | 0 | 0 | 0 | 0 | 0 | 36 (4) | 2 |
| Lee Ashcroft | England | 2002–2003 | 4 | 0 | 0 | 0 | 0 | 0 | 0 | 0 | 0 | 0 | 4 | 0 |
| Denis Atkins | England | 1955–1968 | 194 | 0 | 10 | 0 | 10 | 0 | 0 | 0 | 0 | 0 | 214 | 0 |
| Chris Atkinson | England | 2010–2014 | 5 (5) | 1 | 2 (1) | 0 | 0 | 0 | 0 | 0 | 0 | 0 | 7 (6) | 1 |
| Josh Austerfield | England | 2019–2024 | 1 (2) | 1 | 1 | 0 | 1 (1) | 0 | 0 | 0 | 0 | 0 | 3 (3) | 1 |
| Terry Austin | England | 1980–1982 | 39 (3) | 10 | 6 | 1 | 3 (2) | 1 | 0 | 0 | 0 | 0 | 48 (5) | 12 |
| Juninho Bacuna | Curaçao | 2018–2021 | 78 (24) | 12 | 2 | 0 | 3 | 0 | 0 | 0 | 0 | 0 | 83 (24) | 12 |
| Graham Bailey | England | 1936–1948 | 33 | 0 | 3 | 0 | 0 | 0 | 0 | 0 | 0 | 0 | 36 | 0 |
| Alex Bain | Scotland | 1957–1960 | 29 | 11 | 1 | 0 | 0 | 0 | 0 | 0 | 0 | 0 | 30 | 11 |
| Steve Baines | England | 1975–1978 | 113 (1) | 10 | 7 | 1 | 11 | 1 | 0 | 0 | 0 | 0 | 131 (1) | 12 |
| Harry Baird | Northern Ireland | 1938–1939 | 19 | 4 | 2 | 0 | 0 | 0 | 0 | 0 | 0 | 0 | 21 | 4 |
| Jim Baker | England | 1914–1920 | 56 | 3 | 1 | 0 | 0 | 0 | 0 | 0 | 0 | 0 | 57 | 3 |
| Steve Baker | England | 1999 | 3 | 0 | 0 | 0 | 0 | 0 | 0 | 0 | 0 | 0 | 3 | 0 |
| Chris Balderstone | England | 1960–1965 | 117 | 24 | 7 | 0 | 7 | 1 | 0 | 0 | 0 | 0 | 131 | 25 |
| Simon Baldry | England | 1994–2003 | 87 (59) | 8 | 2 (2) | 0 | 5 (6) | 1 | 3 (3) | 1 | 0 | 0 | 97 (69) | 10 |
| Jack Ball | England | 1934 | 5 | 1 | 0 | 0 | 0 | 0 | 0 | 0 | 0 | 0 | 5 | 1 |
| Ian Banks | England | 1986–1988 | 78 | 17 | 4 | 0 | 4 | 1 | 1 | 0 | 0 | 0 | 87 | 18 |
| Bobby Barclay | England | 1937–1946 | 74 | 19 | 13 | 4 | 0 | 0 | 0 | 0 | 0 | 0 | 87 | 23 |
| Mark Barham | England | 1987–1988 | 25 (2) | 1 | 0 | 0 | 1 (1) | 1 | 1 | 0 | 0 | 0 | 27 (3) | 2 |
| Ned Barkas | England | 1921–1928 | 119 | 4 | 12 | 0 | 0 | 0 | 0 | 0 | 0 | 0 | 131 | 4 |
| Jeff Barker | England | 1945–1948 | 67 | 0 | 4 | 0 | 0 | 0 | 0 | 0 | 0 | 0 | 71 | 0 |
| Pat Barlow | Republic of Ireland | 1938–1939 | 7 | 1 | 0 | 0 | 0 | 0 | 0 | 0 | 0 | 0 | 7 | 1 |
| Paul Barnes | England | 1998–1999 | 13 (17) | 2 | 1 (1) | 0 | 0 (3) | 0 | 0 | 0 | 0 | 0 | 14 (21) | 2 |
| Gary Barnett | England | 1990–1993 | 92 (8) | 11 | 10 | 2 | 11 | 3 | 7 (1) | 1 | 0 (1) | 0 | 120 (10) | 17 |
| Mike Barry | Wales | 1970–1973 | 21 (5) | 0 | 2 | 0 | 0 | 0 | 0 | 0 | 0 | 0 | 23 (5) | 0 |
| William Bartlett | England | 1910–1912 | 66 | 2 | 5 | 0 | 0 | 0 | 0 | 0 | 0 | 0 | 71 | 2 |
| Vince Bartram | England | 1997 | 12 | 0 | 0 | 0 | 0 | 0 | 0 | 0 | 0 | 0 | 12 | 0 |
| Albert Bateman | England | 1946–1950 | 73 | 14 | 5 | 2 | 0 | 0 | 0 | 0 | 0 | 0 | 78 | 16 |
| John Battye | England | 1949–1959 | 71 | 1 | 3 | 0 | 0 | 0 | 0 | 0 | 0 | 0 | 74 | 1 |
| Pat Beasley | England | 1936–1945 | 108 | 24 | 15 | 3 | 0 | 0 | 0 | 0 | 0 | 0 | 123 | 27 |
| Simon Beaton | England | 1910–1919 | 111 | 0 | 7 | 1 | 0 | 0 | 0 | 0 | 0 | 0 | 118 | 1 |
| John Beattie | Scotland | 1938 | 3 | 0 | 1 | 1 | 0 | 0 | 0 | 0 | 0 | 0 | 4 | 1 |
| Len Beaumont | England | 1932–1936 | 12 | 1 | 0 | 0 | 0 | 0 | 0 | 0 | 0 | 0 | 12 | 1 |
| Luke Beckett | England | 2005; 2006–2008 | 64 (21) | 29 | 3 (3) | 4 | 4 | 0 | 1 | 0 | 0 | 0 | 72 (24) | 33 |
| Jermaine Beckford | Jamaica | 2012–2013 | 14 (7) | 8 | 1 | 1 | 0 | 0 | 0 | 0 | 0 | 0 | 15 (7) | 9 |
| Albert Beech | England | 1934–1937 | 22 | 4 | 0 | 0 | 0 | 0 | 0 | 0 | 0 | 0 | 22 | 4 |
| Chris Beech | England | 1998–2002 | 63 (8) | 12 | 2 | 2 | 6 | 1 | 0 | 0 | 0 | 0 | 71 (8) | 15 |
| Rod Belfitt (1st spell) | England | 1975 | 6 | 2 | 0 | 0 | 0 | 0 | 0 | 0 | 0 | 0 | 6 | 2 |
| Rod Belfitt (2nd spell) | England | 1975–1976 | 28 | 6 | 4 | 2 | 3 | 0 | 0 | 0 | 0 | 0 | 35 | 8 |
| Graham Bell | England | 1981 | 2 | 0 | 0 | 0 | 0 | 0 | 0 | 0 | 0 | 0 | 2 | 0 |
| Ian Bennett | England | 2010–2014 | 57 (1) | 0 | 4 | 0 | 2 (1) | 0 | 4 | 0 | 5 | 0 | 72 (2) | 0 |
| Junior Bent | England | 1985–1990 | 25 (11) | 6 | 3 (1) | 1 | 1 | 0 | 1 | 0 | 0 | 0 | 30 (12) | 7 |
| David Beresford | England | 1997–2001 | 24 (11) | 3 | 1 (1) | 0 | 2 (3) | 0 | 0 | 0 | 0 | 0 | 27 (15) | 3 |
| James Berrett | Republic of Ireland | 2007–2010 | 20 (15) | 2 | 2 (1) | 0 | 0 (1) | 0 | 2 | 0 | 0 | 0 | 24 (17) | 2 |
| John Bettany | England | 1960–1965 | 59 | 6 | 5 | 0 | 4 | 0 | 0 | 0 | 0 | 0 | 68 | 6 |
| Scott Bevan | England | 2002–2003 | 30 | 0 | 1 | 0 | 2 | 0 | 1 | 0 | 0 | 0 | 34 | 0 |
| Paul Bielby | England | 1978–1980 | 29 (2) | 5 | 1 | 0 | 0 | 0 | 0 | 0 | 0 | 0 | 30 (2) | 5 |
| Philip Billing | Denmark | 2014–2019 | 54 (27) | 5 | 6 (2) | 0 | 1 (1) | 1 | 0 | 0 | 0 | 0 | 61 (30) | 6 |
| Nicholas Bilokapic | Australia | 2021–2023 | 5 (1) | 0 | 1 (1) | 0 | 0 | 0 | 0 | 0 | 0 | 0 | 6 (2) | 0 |
| Chris Billy | England | 1991–1995 | 76 (18) | 4 | 5 | 0 | 9 (1) | 0 | 11 (1) | 0 | 3 | 2 | 104 (20) | 6 |
| Sid Binks | England | 1924–1925 | 4 | 1 | 0 | 0 | 0 | 0 | 0 | 0 | 0 | 0 | 4 | 1 |
| Kevin Bird | England | 1983 | 1 | 0 | 0 | 0 | 0 | 0 | 0 | 0 | 0 | 0 | 1 | 0 |
| George Blackburn | England | 1910–1912 | 37 | 6 | 2 | 1 | 0 | 0 | 0 | 0 | 0 | 0 | 39 | 7 |
| Fred Blackman | England | 1911–1914 | 92 | 0 | 4 | 0 | 0 | 0 | 0 | 0 | 0 | 0 | 96 | 0 |
| Jamal Blackman | England | 2022 | 1 | 0 | 2 | 0 | 0 | 0 | 0 | 0 | 0 | 0 | 3 | 0 |
| Jack Blackwell | England | 1931–1932 | 3 | 0 | 0 | 0 | 0 | 0 | 0 | 0 | 0 | 0 | 3 | 0 |
| Kevin Blackwell | England | 1993–1995 | 3 (2) | 0 | 1 | 0 | 0 (1) | 0 | 3 | 0 | 0 | 0 | 7 (3) | 0 |
| Herbert Bockhorn | Uganda | 2019–2020 | 0 | 0 | 0 | 0 | 1 | 0 | 0 | 0 | 0 | 0 | 1 | 0 |
| Flo Bojaj | Albania | 2015–2017 | 0 (8) | 1 | 0 | 0 | 0 | 0 | 0 | 0 | 0 | 0 | 0 (8) | 1 |
| Eddie Boot | England | 1937–1952 | 305 | 5 | 20 | 0 | 0 | 0 | 0 | 0 | 0 | 0 | 325 | 5 |
| Leonard Boot | England | 1923–1925 | 10 | 0 | 0 | 0 | 0 | 0 | 0 | 0 | 0 | 0 | 10 | 0 |
| Andy Booth (1st spell) | England | 1992–1996 | 109 (14) | 53 | 8 | 3 | 10 (1) | 3 | 9 (1) | 2 | 3 | 2 | 139 (16) | 63 |
| Andy Booth (2nd spell) | England | 2001–2009 | 230 (41) | 80 | 8 (1) | 2 | 5 (2) | 1 | 8 | 3 | 7 | 1 | 258 (44) | 87 |
| Aidy Boothroyd | England | 1987–1990 | 9 (1) | 0 | 0 | 0 | 0 | 0 | 0 | 0 | 0 | 0 | 9 (1) | 0 |
| Martyn Booty | England | 2003–2004 | 3 (1) | 0 | 0 | 0 | 0 | 0 | 0 | 0 | 0 | 0 | 3 (1) | 0 |
| Wilf Bott | England | 1931–1934 | 110 | 25 | 5 | 1 | 0 | 0 | 0 | 0 | 0 | 0 | 115 | 26 |
| Billy Bottrill | England | 1933–1934 | 12 | 1 | 0 | 0 | 0 | 0 | 0 | 0 | 0 | 0 | 12 | 1 |
| Will Boyle | England | 2015–2017; 2022–2023 | 8 (10) | 0 | 0 (1) | 0 | 1 | 0 | 0 | 0 | 0 | 0 | 9 (11) | 0 |
| Jim Branagan | England | 1977–1979 | 37 (1) | 0 | 0 | 0 | 0 (1) | 0 | 0 | 0 | 0 | 0 | 37 (2) | 0 |
| Chris Brandon | England | 2004–2008 | 120 (15) | 12 | 6 | 2 | 3 (1) | 0 | 2 | 0 | 0 (1) | 0 | 131 (17) | 14 |
| Ian Bray | Wales | 1985–1990 | 87 (2) | 1 | 7 | 0 | 5 | 0 | 1 | 0 | 0 | 0 | 100 (2) | 1 |
| Ronald Brebner | England | 1911–1912 | 23 | 0 | 0 | 0 | 0 | 0 | 0 | 0 | 0 | 0 | 23 | 0 |
| Jim Brennan | Canada | 2001 | 0 (2) | 0 | 0 | 0 | 0 | 0 | 0 | 0 | 0 | 0 | 0 (2) | 0 |
| Tom Briggs | England | 1946–1949 | 45 | 0 | 4 | 0 | 0 | 0 | 0 | 0 | 0 | 0 | 49 | 0 |
| Myles Bright | England | 2021–2024 | 0 | 0 | 0 (1) | 0 | 0 | 0 | 0 | 0 | 0 | 0 | 0 (1) | 0 |
| Daniel Broadbent | England | 2007–2009 | 0 (6) | 0 | 0 | 0 | 0 | 0 | 0 | 0 | 0 | 0 | 0 (6) | 0 |
| Frederick Brock | England | 1920–1921 | 1 | 0 | 0 | 0 | 0 | 0 | 0 | 0 | 0 | 0 | 1 | 0 |
| Daryl Brook | England | 1977–1980 | 1 | 0 | 0 | 0 | 0 | 0 | 0 | 0 | 0 | 0 | 1 | 0 |
| Lewis Brook | England | 1936–1948 | 18 | 6 | 0 | 0 | 0 | 0 | 0 | 0 | 0 | 0 | 18 | 6 |
| Harry Brough | England | 1913–1923 | 60 | 2 | 0 | 0 | 0 | 0 | 0 | 0 | 0 | 0 | 60 | 2 |
| Alan Brown | England | 1934–1936; 1937–1946 | 57 | 0 | 3 | 0 | 0 | 0 | 0 | 0 | 0 | 0 | 60 | 0 |
| Buster Brown | England | 1935–1937 | 20 | 2 | 2 | 0 | 0 | 0 | 0 | 0 | 0 | 0 | 22 | 2 |
| George Brown | England | 1921–1929 | 213 | 142 | 16 | 17 | 0 | 0 | 0 | 0 | 0 | 0 | 229 | 159 |
| Izzy Brown | England | 2017 | 12 (3) | 4 | 2 (1) | 1 | 0 | 0 | 0 | 0 | 3 | 0 | 18 (4) | 5 |
| Jaden Brown | England | 2019–2021 | 13 (15) | 0 | 2 | 0 | 1 | 0 | 0 | 0 | 0 | 0 | 16 (15) | 0 |
| Kenny Brown | England | 1995 | 5 | 0 | 0 | 0 | 0 | 0 | 0 | 0 | 0 | 0 | 5 | 0 |
| Malcolm Brown | England | 1977–1983; 1985–1989 | 349 (3) | 17 | 24 | 4 | 26 (1) | 2 | 0 | 0 | 0 | 0 | 399 (4) | 23 |
| Nat Brown | England | 1999–2005 | 56 (20) | 0 | 1 (1) | 0 | 1 (2) | 0 | 2 (1) | 0 | 0 | 0 | 60 (24) | 0 |
| Reece Brown | England | 2019–2022 | 0 | 0 | 0 | 0 | 1 | 0 | 0 | 0 | 0 | 0 | 1 | 0 |
| Marcus Browning | Wales | 1997–1999 | 25 (8) | 0 | 0 | 0 | 2 (2) | 0 | 0 | 0 | 0 | 0 | 27 (10) | 0 |
| Alex Bruce | Republic of Ireland | 2011 | 3 | 0 | 0 | 0 | 0 | 0 | 0 | 0 | 0 | 0 | 3 | 0 |
| Darren Bullock | England | 1993–1997 | 127 (1) | 17 | 8 | 2 | 11 | 1 | 6 | 1 | 3 | 0 | 155 (1) | 21 |
| Fred Bullock | England | 1910–1922 | 202 | 1 | 13 | 0 | 0 | 0 | 0 | 0 | 0 | 0 | 215 | 1 |
| Frank Bungay | England | 1931–1933 | 18 | 5 | 1 | 0 | 0 | 0 | 0 | 0 | 0 | 0 | 19 | 5 |
| Harry Bunn | England | 2014–2017 | 64 (27) | 15 | 4 (1) | 2 | 2 | 0 | 0 | 0 | 0 | 0 | 70 (27) | 17 |
| David Burke | England | 1981–1987 | 189 | 3 | 15 | 0 | 19 | 0 | 0 | 0 | 0 | 0 | 223 | 3 |
| Ronnie Burke | England | 1949–1953 | 27 | 6 | 1 | 0 | 0 | 0 | 0 | 0 | 0 | 0 | 28 | 6 |
| Wayne Burnett | England | 1996–1998 | 44 (6) | 0 | 1 (1) | 0 | 6 (1) | 1 | 0 | 0 | 0 | 0 | 51 (8) | 1 |
| Gordon Burniston | England | 1910–1912 | 3 | 1 | 2 | 1 | 0 | 0 | 0 | 0 | 0 | 0 | 5 | 2 |
| Gerry Burrell | Northern Ireland | 1953–1956 | 59 | 9 | 2 | 0 | 0 | 0 | 0 | 0 | 0 | 0 | 61 | 9 |
| Andy Butler | England | 2008–2010 | 52 (1) | 4 | 1 | 0 | 2 | 0 | 1 (1) | 0 | 0 | 0 | 56 (2) | 4 |
| Mick Butler | England | 1976–1978 | 73 (6) | 22 | 1 | 0 | 7 | 3 | 0 | 0 | 0 | 0 | 81 (6) | 25 |
| Peter Butler | England | 1982–1986; 1992 | 7 (5) | 0 | 0 | 0 | 0 | 0 | 0 | 0 | 0 | 0 | 7 (5) | 0 |
| Len Butt | England | 1935–1937 | 67 | 11 | 3 | 0 | 0 | 0 | 0 | 0 | 0 | 0 | 70 | 11 |
| Jacob Butterfield | England | 2014–2015 | 50 | 7 | 0 | 0 | 1 (1) | 0 | 0 | 0 | 0 | 0 | 51 (1) | 7 |
| Jack Byers | England | 1921–1923 | 12 | 4 | 0 | 0 | 0 | 0 | 0 | 0 | 0 | 0 | 12 | 4 |
| Mick Byrne | Republic of Ireland | 1988–1990 | 46 (10) | 11 | 2 (1) | 0 | 0 (1) | 0 | 2 | 1 | 0 | 0 | 50 (12) | 12 |
| Danny Cadamarteri | England | 2007–2009; 2011–2012 | 42 (28) | 8 | 1 (3) | 0 | 2 | 0 | 1 (1) | 0 | 0 (2) | 0 | 46 (34) | 8 |
| Terry Caldwell | England | 1957–1959 | 4 | 0 | 0 | 0 | 0 | 0 | 0 | 0 | 0 | 0 | 4 | 0 |
| Nigel Callaghan | England | 1992 | 8 | 0 | 0 | 0 | 0 | 0 | 1 | 0 | 0 | 0 | 9 | 0 |
| Etienne Camara | France | 2021– | 13 (7) | 0 | 1 (1) | 0 | 1 | 0 | 0 | 0 | 0 | 0 | 15 (8) | 0 |
| Jack Cameron | Scotland | 1911 | 2 | 1 | 0 | 0 | 0 | 0 | 0 | 0 | 0 | 0 | 2 | 1 |
| Austen Campbell | England | 1929–1935 | 194 | 5 | 18 | 1 | 0 | 0 | 0 | 0 | 0 | 0 | 212 | 6 |
| Bobby Campbell (1st spell) | Northern Ireland | 1975–1977 | 30 (1) | 9 | 0 | 0 | 3 | 1 | 0 | 0 | 0 | 0 | 33 (1) | 10 |
| Bobby Campbell (2nd spell) | Northern Ireland | 1978 | 7 | 3 | 0 | 0 | 0 | 0 | 0 | 0 | 0 | 0 | 7 | 3 |
| Dave Campbell | Republic of Ireland | 1990–1992 | 4 | 0 | 0 | 0 | 0 | 0 | 0 | 0 | 0 | 0 | 4 | 0 |
| Fraizer Campbell | England | 2019–2022 | 60 (32) | 10 | 1 | 0 | 1 | 0 | 0 | 0 | 0 | 0 | 62 (32) | 10 |
| James Campbell | England | 1911 | 1 | 0 | 0 | 0 | 0 | 0 | 0 | 0 | 0 | 0 | 1 | 0 |
| Jimmy Campbell | Scotland | 1920–1921 | 1 | 0 | 0 | 0 | 0 | 0 | 0 | 0 | 0 | 0 | 1 | 0 |
| Willie Campbell | Scotland | 1928–1929 | 3 | 0 | 0 | 0 | 0 | 0 | 0 | 0 | 0 | 0 | 3 | 0 |
| Mustapha Carayol | Gambia | 2015–2016 | 9 (6) | 3 | 0 | 0 | 0 | 0 | 0 | 0 | 0 | 0 | 9 (6) | 3 |
| Graham Carey | Republic of Ireland | 2010–2011 | 18 (1) | 2 | 3 (1) | 0 | 0 (1) | 0 | 2 | 1 | 0 | 0 | 23 (3) | 3 |
| Mick Carmody | England | 1985 | 8 | 0 | 0 | 0 | 0 | 0 | 0 | 0 | 0 | 0 | 8 | 0 |
| Billy Carr | England | 1926–1934 | 93 | 1 | 7 | 0 | 0 | 0 | 0 | 0 | 0 | 0 | 100 | 1 |
| Daniel Carr | England | 2013–2015 | 0 (2) | 0 | 0 | 0 | 1 | 0 | 0 | 0 | 0 | 0 | 1 (2) | 0 |
| Eddie Carr | England | 1945–1946 | 2 | 0 | 1 | 0 | 0 | 0 | 0 | 0 | 0 | 0 | 3 | 0 |
| Jackie Carr | South Africa | 1950–1952 | 1 | 0 | 0 | 0 | 0 | 0 | 0 | 0 | 0 | 0 | 1 | 0 |
| Jake Carroll | Republic of Ireland | 2013–2015 | 5 (1) | 0 | 0 | 0 | 3 | 0 | 0 | 0 | 0 | 0 | 8 (1) | 0 |
| Tony Carss | England | 2003–2006 | 67 (13) | 3 | 0 (1) | 0 | 6 | 1 | 1 | 0 | 1 | 0 | 75 (14) | 4 |
| Chris Cattlin | England | 1964–1968 | 59 (2) | 1 | 2 | 0 | 7 | 1 | 0 | 0 | 0 | 0 | 68 (2) | 2 |
| Tommy Cavanagh | England | 1952–1956 | 93 | 29 | 5 | 0 | 0 | 0 | 0 | 0 | 0 | 0 | 98 | 29 |
| Harry Cawthorne | England | 1919–1927 | 74 | 2 | 2 | 0 | 0 | 0 | 0 | 0 | 0 | 0 | 76 | 2 |
| Mike Cecere | England | 1988–1990 | 50 (4) | 8 | 7 (1) | 3 | 4 | 1 | 0 | 0 | 0 | 0 | 61 (5) | 12 |
| Trevoh Chalobah | England | 2019–2020 | 30 (6) | 1 | 1 | 0 | 1 | 0 | 0 | 0 | 0 | 0 | 32 (6) | 1 |
| Les Chapman | England | 1969–1974 | 120 (14) | 8 | 11 | 2 | 8 | 0 | 0 | 0 | 0 | 0 | 139 (14) | 10 |
| Vince Chapman | England | 1988–1989 | 4 (2) | 0 | 0 | 0 | 0 | 0 | 0 | 0 | 0 | 0 | 4 (2) | 0 |
| Jake Charles | Wales | 2015–2016 | 0 (1) | 0 | 0 | 0 | 0 | 0 | 0 | 0 | 0 | 0 | 0 (1) | 0 |
| Simon Charlton | England | 1989–1993 | 122 (3) | 1 | 10 | 0 | 9 | 1 | 12 | 0 | 2 | 0 | 155 (3) | 2 |
| Trevor Cherry | England | 1963–1972 | 185 (3) | 12 | 13 | 1 | 7 | 1 | 0 | 0 | 0 | 0 | 205 (3) | 14 |
| Reg Chester | England | 1935–1937 | 25 | 7 | 0 | 0 | 0 | 0 | 0 | 0 | 0 | 0 | 25 | 7 |
| Ben Chilwell | England | 2015–2016 | 7 (1) | 0 | 0 | 0 | 0 | 0 | 0 | 0 | 0 | 0 | 7 (1) | 0 |
| Aidan Chippendale | England | 2009–2012 | 0 (1) | 0 | 0 | 0 | 0 | 0 | 0 | 0 | 0 | 0 | 0 (1) | 0 |
| Frank Chivers | England | 1936–1938 | 50 | 16 | 4 | 1 | 0 | 0 | 0 | 0 | 0 | 0 | 54 | 17 |
| Gilbert Christie | Scotland | 1913–1914 | 2 | 0 | 0 | 0 | 0 | 0 | 0 | 0 | 0 | 0 | 2 | 0 |
| Norman Christie | England | 1931–1934 | 47 | 0 | 1 | 0 | 0 | 0 | 0 | 0 | 0 | 0 | 48 | 0 |
| Simon Church | Wales | 2012 | 7 | 1 | 0 | 0 | 0 | 0 | 0 | 0 | 0 | 0 | 7 | 1 |
| Brian Clark | England | 1966–1968 | 28 (4) | 11 | 0 | 0 | 2 | 0 | 0 | 0 | 0 | 0 | 30 (4) | 11 |
| Dennis Clarke | England | 1969–1973 | 172 | 3 | 11 | 1 | 3 | 0 | 0 | 0 | 0 | 0 | 186 | 4 |
| Nathan Clarke | England | 2001–2012 | 260 (3) | 8 | 15 | 1 | 8 | 0 | 9 (1) | 1 | 2 (1) | 0 | 294 (5) | 10 |
| Peter Clarke | England | 2009–2014 | 189 (3) | 9 | 11 | 0 | 8 | 0 | 5 | 2 | 8 | 0 | 221 (3) | 11 |
| Tim Clarke | England | 1991–1993 | 70 | 0 | 6 | 0 | 7 | 0 | 6 | 0 | 2 | 0 | 91 | 0 |
| Tom Clarke | England | 2005–2013 | 72 (25) | 3 | 1 (4) | 0 | 1 (2) | 0 | 3 (1) | 0 | 1 (2) | 0 | 78 (34) | 3 |
| Adam Clayton | England | 2012–2014 | 84 (1) | 11 | 6 | 1 | 3 | 0 | 0 | 0 | 0 | 0 | 93 (1) | 12 |
| Gary Clayton | England | 1994–1995 | 15 (4) | 1 | 0 (1) | 0 | 0 | 0 | 4 | 2 | 0 | 0 | 19 (5) | 3 |
| Don Clegg | England | 1943–1948 | 3 | 0 | 2 | 0 | 0 | 0 | 0 | 0 | 0 | 0 | 5 | 0 |
| Conor Coady | England | 2014–2015 | 42 (3) | 3 | 1 | 0 | 2 | 0 | 0 | 0 | 0 | 0 | 45 (3) | 3 |
| Jack Cock | England | 1914–1919 | 18 | 9 | 0 | 0 | 0 | 0 | 0 | 0 | 0 | 0 | 18 | 9 |
| Ron Cockerill | England | 1952–1958 | 40 | 1 | 5 | 0 | 0 | 0 | 0 | 0 | 0 | 0 | 45 | 1 |
| John Coddington | England | 1955–1967 | 332 | 17 | 18 | 1 | 6 | 0 | 0 | 0 | 0 | 0 | 356 | 18 |
| Joel Coleman | England | 2016–2020 | 6 (3) | 0 | 7 | 0 | 2 | 0 | 0 | 0 | 1 | 0 | 16 (3) | 0 |
| Nick Colgan | Republic of Ireland | 2011–2013 | 0 | 0 | 1 | 0 | 0 | 0 | 2 | 0 | 0 | 0 | 3 | 0 |
| Michael Collins | Republic of Ireland | 2005–2010 | 148 (25) | 19 | 8 (4) | 2 | 4 (1) | 0 | 5 (1) | 1 | 0 (1) | 0 | 165 (32) | 22 |
| Sam Collins | England | 1992–1999 | 24 (7) | 0 | 2 (2) | 0 | 3 (2) | 0 | 0 | 0 | 0 | 0 | 29 (11) | 0 |
| Simon Collins | England | 1992–1997 | 24 (16) | 3 | 1 (2) | 0 | 1 (2) | 1 | 5 (3) | 0 | 0 | 0 | 31 (23) | 4 |
| Levi Colwill | England | 2021–2022 | 26 (3) | 2 | 0 | 0 | 1 | 0 | 0 | 0 | 2 | 0 | 29 (3) | 2 |
| George Comrie | Scotland | 1912–1913 | 15 | 0 | 0 | 0 | 0 | 0 | 0 | 0 | 0 | 0 | 15 | 0 |
| Ollie Conmy | Republic of Ireland | 1959–1964 | 3 | 0 | 0 | 0 | 2 | 0 | 0 | 0 | 0 | 0 | 5 | 0 |
| Jack Connor | England | 1952–1960 | 85 | 10 | 9 | 2 | 0 | 0 | 0 | 0 | 0 | 0 | 94 | 12 |
| John Connor | England | 1914–1915 | 3 | 0 | 0 | 0 | 0 | 0 | 0 | 0 | 0 | 0 | 3 | 0 |
| Tony Conwell | England | 1955–1959 | 106 | 2 | 6 | 0 | 0 | 0 | 0 | 0 | 0 | 0 | 112 | 2 |
| George Cook | England | 1923–1927 | 87 | 35 | 4 | 0 | 0 | 0 | 0 | 0 | 0 | 0 | 91 | 35 |
| Graham Cooper | England | 1984–1988 | 61 (13) | 13 | 3 (3) | 0 | 3 (3) | 0 | 0 | 0 | 0 | 0 | 69 (19) | 13 |
| Liam Cooper | Scotland | 2011 | 2 (2) | 0 | 0 | 0 | 1 | 0 | 2 | 0 | 0 | 0 | 5 (2) | 0 |
| Mark Cooper | England | 1993–1994 | 10 | 4 | 0 | 0 | 0 | 0 | 0 | 0 | 0 | 0 | 10 | 4 |
| Paul Cooper | England | 1975–1977 | 2 | 0 | 0 | 0 | 0 | 0 | 0 | 0 | 0 | 0 | 2 | 0 |
| Sedley Cooper | England | 1936–1937 | 5 | 1 | 0 | 0 | 0 | 0 | 0 | 0 | 0 | 0 | 5 | 1 |
| David Cork | England | 1985–1989 | 104 (6) | 25 | 5 (1) | 1 | 7 (1) | 2 | 1 | 0 | 0 | 0 | 117 (8) | 28 |
| Willie Coulson | England | 1975 | 2 | 0 | 0 | 0 | 0 | 0 | 0 | 0 | 0 | 0 | 2 | 0 |
| Tom Cowan (1st spell) | Scotland | 1994 | 10 | 0 | 0 | 0 | 0 | 0 | 1 | 0 | 0 | 0 | 11 | 0 |
| Tom Cowan (2nd spell) | Scotland | 1994–1999 | 127 | 8 | 9 | 1 | 13 | 1 | 2 | 0 | 3 | 0 | 154 | 10 |
| Billy Cowell | England | 1921–1924 | 9 | 0 | 0 | 0 | 0 | 0 | 0 | 0 | 0 | 0 | 9 | 0 |
| Arthur Cowley | England | 1911–1912 | 5 | 2 | 0 | 0 | 0 | 0 | 0 | 0 | 0 | 0 | 5 | 2 |
| David Cowling | England | 1977–1988 | 331 (9) | 43 | 25 | 2 | 26 (1) | 3 | 1 | 0 | 0 | 0 | 383 (10) | 48 |
| Brian Cox | England | 1982–1988 | 213 | 0 | 14 | 0 | 22 | 0 | 0 | 0 | 0 | 0 | 249 | 0 |
| Maurice Cox | England | 1982 | 3 (1) | 1 | 0 | 0 | 1 | 0 | 0 | 0 | 0 | 0 | 4 (1) | 1 |
| Benny Craig | England | 1934–1938 | 98 | 0 | 8 | 0 | 0 | 0 | 0 | 0 | 0 | 0 | 106 | 0 |
| Ian Craney | England | 2008–2010 | 23 (11) | 5 | 1 | 1 | 0 | 0 | 0 | 0 | 0 | 0 | 24 (11) | 6 |
| Martin Cranie | England | 2015–2018 | 37 (17) | 0 | 4 (1) | 0 | 3 | 0 | 0 | 0 | 0 (2) | 0 | 44 (19) | 0 |
| Romoney Crichlow | England | 2020–2023 | 2 (2) | 0 | 1 | 1 | 1 | 0 | 0 | 0 | 0 | 0 | 4 (2) | 1 |
| Lee Croft | England | 2010–2011 | 0 (3) | 0 | 0 | 0 | 1 | 0 | 0 (2) | 0 | 0 | 0 | 1 (5) | 0 |
| Matt Crooks | England | 2010–2015 | 1 | 0 | 0 | 0 | 0 | 0 | 0 | 0 | 0 | 0 | 1 | 0 |
| Gary Crosby | England | 1994–1997 | 35 (9) | 6 | 3 | 1 | 2 | 0 | 2 (2) | 1 | 3 | 0 | 45 (11) | 8 |
| George Crownshaw | England | 1929–1934 | 26 | 8 | 1 | 0 | 0 | 0 | 0 | 0 | 0 | 0 | 27 | 8 |
| George Crowther | England | 1912–1913 | 2 | 0 | 0 | 0 | 0 | 0 | 0 | 0 | 0 | 0 | 2 | 0 |
| Laurie Cumming | Ireland | 1927–1929 | 19 | 6 | 2 | 2 | 0 | 0 | 0 | 0 | 0 | 0 | 21 | 8 |
| Terry Curran | England | 1985–1986 | 33 (1) | 7 | 0 | 0 | 2 | 1 | 0 | 0 | 0 | 0 | 35 (1) | 8 |
| David Currie | England | 1994 | 7 | 1 | 0 | 0 | 0 | 0 | 1 | 0 | 0 | 0 | 8 | 1 |
| Tom Daley | England | 1957–1958 | 1 | 0 | 0 | 0 | 0 | 0 | 0 | 0 | 0 | 0 | 1 | 0 |
| Paul Dalton | England | 1995–2000 | 79 (19) | 25 | 5 (1) | 0 | 9 (3) | 2 | 0 | 0 | 0 | 0 | 93 (23) | 27 |
| Matty Daly | England | 2019–2023 | 1 (10) | 1 | 1 | 0 | 0 | 0 | 0 | 0 | 0 | 0 | 2 (10) | 1 |
| Neil Danns | Guyana | 2013 | 17 | 2 | 1 | 0 | 0 | 0 | 0 | 0 | 0 | 0 | 18 | 2 |
| Jason Davidson | Australia | 2015–2017 | 26 (1) | 1 | 2 | 0 | 1 | 0 | 0 | 0 | 0 | 0 | 29 (1) | 1 |
| Willie Davie | Scotland | 1951–1957 | 113 | 16 | 5 | 0 | 0 | 0 | 0 | 0 | 0 | 0 | 118 | 16 |
| Harry Davies | England | 1929–1932 | 55 | 17 | 2 | 0 | 0 | 0 | 0 | 0 | 0 | 0 | 57 | 17 |
| Simon Davies | Wales | 1996 | 3 | 0 | 0 | 0 | 0 | 0 | 0 | 0 | 0 | 0 | 3 | 0 |
| Ted Davis | England | 1913–1922 | 50 | 0 | 7 | 0 | 0 | 0 | 0 | 0 | 0 | 0 | 57 | 0 |
| Bobby Davison | England | 1980–1981 | 1 (1) | 0 | 0 | 0 | 0 | 0 | 0 | 0 | 0 | 0 | 1 (1) | 0 |
| Damien Delaney | Republic of Ireland | 2002 | 1 (1) | 0 | 0 | 0 | 0 | 0 | 0 | 0 | 0 | 0 | 1 (1) | 0 |
| Kyle Dempsey | England | 2015–2017 | 10 (11) | 1 | 1 (1) | 0 | 1 | 0 | 0 | 0 | 0 | 0 | 12 (12) | 1 |
| Harry Dennis | England | 1924–1926 | 1 | 0 | 0 | 0 | 0 | 0 | 0 | 0 | 0 | 0 | 1 | 0 |
| Johnny Dent | England | 1926–1929 | 48 | 22 | 5 | 0 | 0 | 0 | 0 | 0 | 0 | 0 | 53 | 22 |
| Laurent Depoitre | Belgium | 2017–2019 | 28 (28) | 6 | 2 | 0 | 2 | 0 | 0 | 0 | 0 | 0 | 32 (28) | 6 |
| William Devlin | Scotland | 1926–1927 | 32 | 14 | 0 | 0 | 0 | 0 | 0 | 0 | 0 | 0 | 32 | 14 |
| Rob Dewhurst | England | 1992 | 7 | 0 | 0 | 0 | 0 | 0 | 0 | 0 | 0 | 0 | 7 | 0 |
| Brahima Diarra | Mali | 2020–2024 | 11 (30) | 0 | 0 (3) | 0 | 1 | 0 | 0 | 0 | 0 | 0 | 12 (33) | 0 |
| Adama Diakhaby | France | 2018–2021 | 22 (24) | 0 | 1 | 0 | 0 (1) | 0 | 0 | 0 | 0 | 0 | 23 (25) | 0 |
| Andy Dibble | Wales | 1987 | 5 | 0 | 0 | 0 | 0 | 0 | 0 | 0 | 0 | 0 | 5 | 0 |
| Liam Dickinson | England | 2008 | 13 | 6 | 0 | 0 | 0 | 0 | 0 | 0 | 0 | 0 | 13 | 6 |
| Charles Dinnie | Scotland | 1910–1913 | 17 | 0 | 1 | 0 | 0 | 0 | 0 | 0 | 0 | 0 | 18 | 0 |
| Peter Dinsdale | England | 1956–1967 | 213 (1) | 8 | 13 | 0 | 12 | 2 | 0 | 0 | 0 | 0 | 238 (1) | 10 |
| Ernie Dixon | England | 1929 | 5 | 1 | 0 | 0 | 0 | 0 | 0 | 0 | 0 | 0 | 5 | 1 |
| Paul Dixon | Scotland | 2012–2015 | 74 (11) | 0 | 4 | 0 | 3 | 0 | 0 | 0 | 0 | 0 | 81 (11) | 0 |
| Colin Dobson | England | 1966–1972 | 149 (6) | 50 | 5 | 0 | 13 | 2 | 0 | 0 | 0 | 0 | 167 (7) | 52 |
| Bill Dodgin | England | 1929–1933 | 10 | 0 | 0 | 0 | 0 | 0 | 0 | 0 | 0 | 0 | 10 | 0 |
| Peter Doherty | Northern Ireland | 1946–1949 | 83 | 33 | 4 | 3 | 0 | 0 | 0 | 0 | 0 | 0 | 87 | 36 |
| Terry Dolan | England | 1970–1976 | 157 (5) | 14 | 12 (1) | 1 | 9 | 1 | 0 | 0 | 0 | 0 | 178 (6) | 16 |
| Georgios Donis | Greece | 1999–2000 | 10 (10) | 0 | 0 (1) | 0 | 3 (1) | 0 | 0 | 0 | 0 | 0 | 13 (12) | 0 |
| Kevin Donovan | England | 1989–1992 | 11 (9) | 1 | 1 | 2 | 1 (1) | 0 | 0 | 0 | 0 | 0 | 17 (10) | 3 |
| James Dow | England | 1912–1915 | 47 | 0 | 2 | 0 | 0 | 0 | 0 | 0 | 0 | 0 | 49 | 0 |
| Steve Doyle | Wales | 1982–1986 | 158 (3) | 6 | 11 | 0 | 15 | 0 | 0 | 0 | 0 | 0 | 184 (3) | 6 |
| Ray Dring | England | 1944–1948 | 4 | 0 | 0 | 0 | 0 | 0 | 0 | 0 | 0 | 0 | 4 | 0 |
| Danny Drinkwater | England | 2009–2010 | 27 (6) | 2 | 0 (1) | 0 | 1 | 0 | 0 | 0 | 2 | 0 | 30 (7) | 2 |
| Andy Duggan | England | 1988–1991 | 29 | 3 | 0 | 0 | 0 | 0 | 2 | 1 | 0 | 0 | 31 | 4 |
| Demeaco Duhaney | England | 2019–2021 | 12 (8) | 0 | 1 | 0 | 0 | 0 | 0 | 0 | 0 | 0 | 13 (8) | 0 |
| John Dungworth | England | 1972–1975 | 18 (5) | 1 | 0 | 0 | 0 | 0 | 0 | 0 | 0 | 0 | 18 (5) | 1 |
| Iain Dunn | England | 1992–1997 | 62 (58) | 14 | 6 (3) | 3 | 6 (4) | 3 | 10 (4) | 9 | 0 (3) | 0 | 84 (72) | 29 |
| Erik Durm | Germany | 2018–2019 | 21 (7) | 0 | 1 | 0 | 1 | 0 | 0 | 0 | 0 | 0 | 23 (7) | 0 |
| Ian Duthie | Scotland | 1949–1954 | 7 | 0 | 2 | 0 | 0 | 0 | 0 | 0 | 0 | 0 | 9 | 0 |
| Lee Duxbury | England | 1994–1995 | 29 | 2 | 0 | 0 | 1 | 0 | 0 | 0 | 3 | 0 | 33 | 2 |
| Robert Duxbury | England | 1910–1912 | 6 | 0 | 0 | 0 | 0 | 0 | 0 | 0 | 0 | 0 | 6 | 0 |
| Alex Dyer | England | 1997–1998 | 8 (4) | 1 | 0 | 0 | 3 | 1 | 0 | 0 | 0 | 0 | 11 (4) | 2 |
| Jon Dyson | England | 1992–2002 | 184 (32) | 9 | 11 | 0 | 19 (4) | 0 | 7 (2) | 0 | 0 (1) | 0 | 221 (39) | 9 |
| Peter Eastoe | England | 1984 | 8 (2) | 0 | 0 | 0 | 0 | 0 | 0 | 0 | 0 | 0 | 8 (2) | 0 |
| Simon Eastwood | England | 2006–2010 | 1 | 0 | 0 | 0 | 0 | 0 | 0 | 0 | 0 | 0 | 1 | 0 |
| Terry Eccles | England | 1977–1978 | 41 (5) | 6 | 1 | 0 | 4 | 2 | 0 | 0 | 0 | 0 | 46 (5) | 8 |
| Nathan Eccleston | England | 2010 | 4 (7) | 1 | 0 | 0 | 0 | 0 | 0 | 0 | 0 (1) | 0 | 4 (8) | 1 |
| David Edgar | Canada | 2015 | 9 (3) | 0 | 0 | 0 | 0 | 0 | 0 | 0 | 0 | 0 | 9 (3) | 0 |
| Darren Edmondson | England | 1997–2000 | 28 (9) | 0 | 2 (2) | 0 | 2 | 0 | 0 | 0 | 0 | 0 | 32 (11) | 0 |
| Keith Edwards (1st spell) | England | 1990 | 6 (4) | 4 | 0 | 0 | 0 | 0 | 0 | 0 | 0 | 0 | 6 (4) | 4 |
| Keith Edwards (2nd spell) | England | 1990–1991 | 10 (8) | 4 | 1 | 0 | 1 (1) | 0 | 0 (1) | 0 | 0 | 0 | 12 (10) | 4 |
| Rob Edwards (1st spell) | England | 1996–2000 | 109 (29) | 14 | 7 (1) | 1 | 12 (1) | 1 | 0 | 0 | 0 | 0 | 128 (31) | 16 |
| Rob Edwards (2nd spell) | England | 2003–2005 | 32 (9) | 3 | 0 | 0 | 2 | 0 | 0 | 0 | 2 (1) | 1 | 36 (10) | 4 |
| Carel Eiting (1st spell) | Netherlands | 2020–2021 | 17 (6) | 3 | 0 | 0 | 0 | 0 | 0 | 0 | 0 | 0 | 17 (6) | 3 |
| Carel Eiting (2nd spell) | Netherlands | 2022 | 1 (4) | 0 | 2 | 0 | 0 | 0 | 0 | 0 | 0 | 0 | 3 (4) | 0 |
| Roy Ellam (1st spell) | England | 1966–1972 | 206 | 8 | 12 | 0 | 14 | 0 | 0 | 0 | 0 | 0 | 232 | 8 |
| Roy Ellam (2nd spell) | England | 1974–1975 | 18 | 2 | 1 | 0 | 2 | 0 | 0 | 0 | 0 | 0 | 21 | 2 |
| Thomas Elliott | England | 1912–1919 | 72 | 18 | 3 | 2 | 0 | 0 | 0 | 0 | 0 | 0 | 75 | 20 |
| Tony Elliott | England | 1992–1993 | 15 | 0 | 3 | 0 | 2 | 0 | 3 | 0 | 0 | 0 | 23 | 0 |
| Tommy Elphick | England | 2019–2021 | 14 | 0 | 0 | 0 | 0 | 0 | 0 | 0 | 0 | 0 | 14 | 0 |
| Barry Endean | England | 1975–1976 | 8 (4) | 1 | 0 | 0 | 0 | 0 | 0 | 0 | 0 | 0 | 8 (4) | 1 |
| Dai Evans | Wales | 1928–1929 | 18 | 0 | 1 | 0 | 0 | 0 | 0 | 0 | 0 | 0 | 19 | 0 |
| Gareth Evans | England | 2001–2003 | 35 | 0 | 0 | 0 | 1 | 0 | 3 | 0 | 2 | 0 | 41 | 0 |
| Mel Eves | England | 1984 | 7 | 4 | 0 | 0 | 0 | 0 | 0 | 0 | 0 | 0 | 7 | 4 |
| Delroy Facey (1st spell) | Grenada | 1997–2002 | 40 (35) | 15 | 1 (2) | 0 | 1 (1) | 0 | 0 | 0 | 2 | 0 | 44 (38) | 15 |
| Delroy Facey (2nd spell) | Grenada | 2005 | 4 | 0 | 0 | 0 | 0 | 0 | 0 | 0 | 0 | 0 | 4 | 0 |
| Mick Fairclough | Republic of Ireland | 1971–1975 | 25 (10) | 2 | 2 (1) | 2 | 1 | 0 | 0 | 0 | 0 | 0 | 28 (11) | 4 |
| Fred Fayers | England | 1909–1915 | 158 | 15 | 10 | 3 | 0 | 0 | 0 | 0 | 0 | 0 | 168 | 18 |
| Harry Fearnley | England | 1952–1963 | 90 | 0 | 10 | 0 | 3 | 0 | 0 | 0 | 0 | 0 | 103 | 0 |
| Thomas Felstead | England | 1909–1911 | 31 | 0 | 2 | 0 | 0 | 0 | 0 | 0 | 0 | 0 | 33 | 0 |
| Franny Firth | England | 1973–1978 | 26 (1) | 4 | 0 | 0 | 4 | 0 | 0 | 0 | 0 | 0 | 30 (1) | 4 |
| Peter Fletcher | England | 1978–1982 | 83 (16) | 36 | 6 (2) | 4 | 8 | 5 | 0 | 0 | 0 | 0 | 97 (18) | 45 |
| Michael Flynn | Wales | 2008–2009 | 18 (7) | 4 | 0 | 0 | 2 | 1 | 0 | 0 | 0 | 0 | 20 (7) | 5 |
| Billy Fogg | England | 1928–1933 | 62 | 3 | 7 | 0 | 0 | 0 | 0 | 0 | 0 | 0 | 69 | 3 |
| Lee Fowler | Wales | 2003–2005 | 35 (14) | 0 | 0 (1) | 0 | 3 | 0 | 2 | 1 | 0 (1) | 0 | 40 (16) | 1 |
| Martin Fowler | England | 1974–1978 | 62 (11) | 2 | 2 | 0 | 4 | 0 | 0 | 0 | 0 | 0 | 68 (11) | 2 |
| Paul France | England | 1985–1989 | 7 (4) | 0 | 3 | 0 | 0 | 0 | 1 | 0 | 0 | 0 | 11 (4) | 0 |
| Tony France | England | 1956–1961 | 9 | 2 | 0 | 0 | 0 | 0 | 0 | 0 | 0 | 0 | 9 | 2 |
| Steve Francis | England | 1993–1999 | 186 | 0 | 9 | 0 | 20 | 0 | 9 | 0 | 3 | 0 | 227 | 0 |
| Billy Fraser | Scotland | 1963–1965 | 8 | 2 | 0 | 0 | 0 | 0 | 0 | 0 | 0 | 0 | 8 | 2 |
| Bryan Frear | England | 1950–1957 | 37 | 10 | 2 | 0 | 0 | 0 | 0 | 0 | 0 | 0 | 39 | 10 |
| Neil Freeman (1st spell) | England | 1981 | 10 | 0 | 0 | 0 | 0 | 0 | 0 | 0 | 0 | 0 | 10 | 0 |
| Neil Freeman (2nd spell) | England | 1981 | 8 | 0 | 0 | 0 | 0 | 0 | 0 | 0 | 0 | 0 | 8 | 0 |
| Kevin Gallacher | Scotland | 2002 | 5 (2) | 0 | 0 | 0 | 1 | 0 | 0 | 0 | 0 | 0 | 6 (2) | 0 |
| Kevin Gallen | England | 2000–2001 | 30 (8) | 10 | 1 | 0 | 0 | 0 | 0 | 0 | 0 | 0 | 31 (8) | 10 |
| Charlie Gallogly | Northern Ireland | 1949–1952 | 76 | 0 | 2 | 0 | 0 | 0 | 0 | 0 | 0 | 0 | 78 | 0 |
| Joe Garner | England | 2010–2011 | 10 (6) | 0 | 0 | 0 | 1 | 0 | 0 (2) | 0 | 0 | 0 | 11 (8) | 0 |
| Paul Garner | England | 1972–1975 | 96 | 2 | 2 | 0 | 8 | 0 | 0 | 0 | 0 | 0 | 106 | 2 |
| Paul Gartland | England | 1977–1980 | 8 | 0 | 0 | 0 | 0 | 0 | 0 | 0 | 0 | 0 | 8 | 0 |
| Colin Garwood | England | 1974–1976 | 22 (6) | 8 | 2 | 0 | 0 | 0 | 0 | 0 | 0 | 0 | 24 (6) | 8 |
| Jason Gavin | Republic of Ireland | 2003 | 10 | 1 | 0 | 0 | 0 | 0 | 0 | 0 | 0 | 0 | 10 | 1 |
| Anthony Gerrard | Republic of Ireland | 2012–2015 | 72 (9) | 1 | 6 (1) | 0 | 3 | 0 | 0 | 0 | 0 | 0 | 81 (10) | 2 |
| Brian Gibson | England | 1951–1962 | 157 | 1 | 13 | 0 | 1 | 0 | 0 | 0 | 0 | 0 | 171 | 1 |
| Bertram Gilboy | England | 1912–1913 | 3 | 0 | 0 | 0 | 0 | 0 | 0 | 0 | 0 | 0 | 3 | 0 |
| John Gilligan | England | 1976 | 0 (1) | 0 | 0 | 0 | 0 | 0 | 0 | 0 | 0 | 0 | 0 (1) | 0 |
| Allan Gilliver | England | 1961–1966 | 45 | 22 | 5 | 0 | 3 | 0 | 0 | 0 | 0 | 0 | 53 | 22 |
| Jimmy Glazzard | England | 1943–1956 | 299 | 142 | 22 | 12 | 0 | 0 | 0 | 0 | 0 | 0 | 321 | 154 |
| Matt Glennon | England | 2006–2010 | 109 | 0 | 7 | 0 | 4 | 0 | 2 | 0 | 0 | 0 | 122 | 0 |
| Lee Glover | Scotland | 1997 | 11 | 0 | 0 | 0 | 0 | 0 | 0 | 0 | 0 | 0 | 11 | 0 |
| Oscar Gobern | England | 2011–2015 | 51 (20) | 3 | 1 (1) | 0 | 3 (1) | 0 | 2 | 0 | 0 | 0 | 57 (22) | 3 |
| Wayne Goldthorpe | England | 1975–1978 | 19 (7) | 7 | 1 | 0 | 1 | 0 | 0 | 0 | 0 | 0 | 21 (7) | 7 |
| Roy Goodall | England | 1921–1937 | 403 | 19 | 37 | 2 | 0 | 0 | 0 | 0 | 0 | 0 | 440 | 21 |
| Jim Goodwin | Republic of Ireland | 2008–2010 | 38 (4) | 1 | 1 | 0 | 1 (1) | 0 | 2 | 0 | 0 | 0 | 42 (5) | 1 |
| Robert Gordon | England | 1936–1940 | 7 | 0 | 0 | 0 | 0 | 0 | 0 | 0 | 0 | 0 | 7 | 0 |
| Dean Gorré | Suriname | 1999–2001 | 49 (13) | 6 | 1 (1) | 0 | 4 | 1 | 0 | 0 | 0 | 0 | 54 (14) | 7 |
| Alan Gowling | England | 1972–1975 | 128 | 58 | 5 | 1 | 6 | 2 | 0 | 0 | 0 | 0 | 139 | 61 |
| Peter Goy | England | 1965–1967 | 4 | 0 | 0 | 0 | 0 | 0 | 0 | 0 | 0 | 0 | 4 | 0 |
| Kamil Grabara | Poland | 2019–2020 | 28 | 0 | 0 | 0 | 0 | 0 | 0 | 0 | 0 | 0 | 28 | 0 |
| David Graham | Scotland | 2006 | 15 (1) | 9 | 0 | 0 | 0 | 0 | 0 | 0 | 2 | 0 | 17 (1) | 9 |
| Karlan Grant | England | 2019–2020 | 51 (5) | 23 | 0 (1) | 0 | 0 | 0 | 0 | 0 | 0 | 0 | 51 (6) | 23 |
| Ian Gray | England | 2003–2004 | 29 | 0 | 1 | 0 | 4 | 0 | 1 | 0 | 0 | 0 | 35 | 0 |
| Kevin Gray | England | 1994–2002 | 214 (16) | 6 | 15 | 0 | 12 (1) | 0 | 9 | 0 | 2 | 0 | 252 (17) | 6 |
| Terry Gray | England | 1972–1979 | 146 (17) | 36 | 9 | 2 | 7 (2) | 3 | 0 | 0 | 0 | 0 | 162 (19) | 41 |
| Arthur Green | England | 1951–1952 | 3 | 0 | 0 | 0 | 0 | 0 | 0 | 0 | 0 | 0 | 3 | 0 |
| George Green | England | 1944–1947 | 9 | 1 | 2 | 0 | 0 | 0 | 0 | 0 | 0 | 0 | 11 | 1 |
| Brian Greenhalgh | England | 1969–1971 | 15 | 0 | 2 | 0 | 0 | 0 | 0 | 0 | 0 | 0 | 17 | 0 |
| Roy Greenwood | England | 1982–1984 | 5 (3) | 0 | 0 (1) | 0 | 2 | 0 | 0 | 0 | 0 | 0 | 7 (4) | 0 |
| Frederick Groves | England | 1912–1914 | 4 | 0 | 0 | 0 | 0 | 0 | 0 | 0 | 0 | 0 | 4 | 0 |
| William Grundy | England | 1909–1910 | 18 | 12 | 0 | 0 | 0 | 0 | 0 | 0 | 0 | 0 | 18 | 12 |
| Joey Guðjónsson | Iceland | 2010–2012 | 34 (10) | 2 | 2 (1) | 0 | 2 | 0 | 4 (1) | 0 | 1 | 0 | 43 (12) | 2 |
| Alistair Gunn | Scotland | 1951–1954 | 83 | 11 | 2 | 0 | 0 | 0 | 0 | 0 | 0 | 0 | 85 | 11 |
| Florent Hadergjonaj | Kosovo | 2017–2020 | 52 (16) | 0 | 3 (1) | 0 | 1 | 0 | 0 | 0 | 0 | 0 | 56 (17) | 0 |
| Neil Hague | England | 1976–1977 | 25 | 2 | 1 | 0 | 4 | 0 | 0 | 0 | 0 | 0 | 30 | 2 |
| Ellis Hall | England | 1910–1912 | 39 | 2 | 1 | 0 | 0 | 0 | 0 | 0 | 0 | 0 | 40 | 2 |
| Harold Hall | England | 1910–1911 | 20 | 0 | 5 | 1 | 0 | 0 | 0 | 0 | 0 | 0 | 25 | 1 |
| Ben Hamer | England | 2018–2021 | 22 | 0 | 2 | 0 | 1 | 0 | 0 | 0 | 0 | 0 | 25 | 0 |
| Des Hamilton | England | 1999 | 10 | 1 | 0 | 0 | 0 | 0 | 0 | 0 | 0 | 0 | 10 | 1 |
| Henry Hamilton | England | 1909–1911 | 18 | 15 | 4 | 3 | 0 | 0 | 0 | 0 | 0 | 0 | 22 | 18 |
| Adam Hammill (1st spell) | England | 2012–2013 | 6 (10) | 2 | 0 | 0 | 0 | 0 | 0 | 0 | 0 | 0 | 6 (10) | 2 |
| Adam Hammill (2nd spell) | England | 2013–2015 | 43 (7) | 4 | 3 | 0 | 2 (4) | 1 | 0 | 0 | 0 | 0 | 48 (11) | 5 |
| James Hand | Republic of Ireland | 2005–2007 | 0 (1) | 0 | 0 | 0 | 0 | 0 | 1 | 0 | 0 | 0 | 1 (1) | 0 |
| Karl Aage Hansen | Denmark | 1949 | 15 | 2 | 0 | 0 | 0 | 0 | 0 | 0 | 0 | 0 | 15 | 2 |
| Keith Hanvey | England | 1978–1984 | 205 | 14 | 14 | 1 | 16 | 0 | 0 | 0 | 0 | 0 | 235 | 15 |
| Steve Hardwick | England | 1988–1991 | 109 | 0 | 6 | 0 | 8 | 0 | 6 | 0 | 0 | 0 | 129 | 0 |
| Aaron Hardy | England | 2005–2008 | 10 (5) | 0 | 0 | 0 | 0 (1) | 0 | 3 | 0 | 0 | 0 | 13 (6) | 0 |
| Gary Harkins | Scotland | 2004 | 1 (2) | 0 | 0 | 0 | 0 | 0 | 0 | 0 | 0 | 0 | 1 (2) | 0 |
| Steve Harkness | England | 1993 | 5 | 0 | 0 | 0 | 0 | 0 | 1 | 0 | 0 | 0 | 6 | 0 |
| Joe Harper | Scotland | 1966–1968 | 26 (2) | 4 | 0 | 0 | 1 (1) | 0 | 0 | 0 | 0 | 0 | 27 (3) | 4 |
| Steve Harper | England | 1997–1998 | 24 | 0 | 2 | 0 | 0 | 0 | 0 | 0 | 0 | 0 | 26 | 0 |
| Rennie Harrison | England | 1919–1920 | 1 | 0 | 0 | 0 | 0 | 0 | 0 | 0 | 0 | 0 | 1 | 0 |
| Peter Hart | England | 1974–1980 | 208 (2) | 7 | 5 | 1 | 14 | 0 | 0 | 0 | 0 | 0 | 227 (2) | 8 |
| Harold Hassall | England | 1946–1952 | 74 | 26 | 4 | 0 | 0 | 0 | 0 | 0 | 0 | 0 | 78 | 26 |
| Archibald Hastie | Scotland | 1936–1937 | 13 | 1 | 0 | 0 | 0 | 0 | 0 | 0 | 0 | 0 | 13 | 1 |
| Derek Hawksworth | England | 1958–1960 | 55 | 14 | 4 | 0 | 0 | 0 | 0 | 0 | 0 | 0 | 59 | 14 |
| Chris Hay | Scotland | 2000–2002 | 21 (21) | 5 | 0 (1) | 0 | 3 | 0 | 2 (2) | 1 | 0 (2) | 0 | 26 (26) | 6 |
| Bill Hayes | Ireland; Republic of Ireland | 1933–1950 | 181 | 5 | 14 | 0 | 0 | 0 | 0 | 0 | 0 | 0 | 195 | 5 |
| Paul Hayes | England | 2007 | 4 | 1 | 0 | 0 | 0 | 0 | 0 | 0 | 0 | 0 | 4 | 1 |
| Garry Haylock | England | 1991 | 10 (3) | 4 | 0 | 0 | 0 | 0 | 0 | 0 | 0 | 0 | 10 (3) | 4 |
| Thomas Heary | Republic of Ireland | 1996–2003 | 68 (24) | 0 | 4 | 0 | 3 (1) | 0 | 7 | 0 | 2 | 0 | 84 (25) | 0 |
| Michael Hefele | Germany | 2016–2018 | 28 (11) | 3 | 2 (1) | 2 | 2 (1) | 0 | 0 | 0 | 3 | 0 | 35 (13) | 5 |
| Dean Heffernan | Australia | 2010 | 15 | 0 | 0 | 0 | 0 | 0 | 0 | 0 | 0 | 0 | 15 | 0 |
| Mike Hellawell | England | 1966–1968 | 45 (1) | 1 | 2 | 0 | 6 | 0 | 0 | 0 | 0 | 0 | 53 (1) | 1 |
| George Hepplewhite | England | 1939–1951 | 156 | 3 | 9 | 0 | 0 | 0 | 0 | 0 | 0 | 0 | 165 | 3 |
| Stan Hepton | England | 1957–1959 | 6 | 1 | 1 | 0 | 0 | 0 | 0 | 0 | 0 | 0 | 7 | 1 |
| Bob Hesford | England | 1933–1950 | 203 | 0 | 17 | 0 | 0 | 0 | 0 | 0 | 0 | 0 | 220 | 0 |
| Sean Hessey | England | 1998–1999 | 7 (4) | 0 | 1 | 0 | 0 | 0 | 0 | 0 | 0 | 0 | 8 (4) | 0 |
| Stuart Hicks | England | 1993–1994 | 20 (2) | 1 | 3 | 0 | 3 | 0 | 1 | 0 | 0 | 0 | 27 (2) | 1 |
| Dave Hickson | England | 1955–1957 | 54 | 28 | 6 | 3 | 0 | 0 | 0 | 0 | 0 | 0 | 60 | 31 |
| Kallum Higginbotham | England | 2012–2013 | 3 (1) | 0 | 0 | 0 | 0 | 0 | 0 | 0 | 2 (1) | 0 | 5 (2) | 0 |
| Brian Hill | England | 1966–1969 | 85 (3) | 6 | 4 | 1 | 9 | 0 | 0 | 0 | 0 | 0 | 98 (3) | 7 |
| Tom Hinchcliffe | England | 1938 | 13 | 4 | 0 | 0 | 0 | 0 | 0 | 0 | 0 | 0 | 13 | 4 |
| Ernie Hine | England | 1932–1933 | 23 | 4 | 2 | 0 | 0 | 0 | 0 | 0 | 0 | 0 | 25 | 4 |
| Jordy Hiwula | England | 2015–2018 | 0 | 0 | 0 | 0 | 0 (1) | 0 | 0 | 0 | 0 | 0 | 0 (1) | 0 |
| Albert Hobson | England | 1954–1956 | 9 | 0 | 5 | 1 | 0 | 0 | 0 | 0 | 0 | 0 | 14 | 1 |
| George Hobson | England | 1925–1927 | 2 | 0 | 0 | 0 | 0 | 0 | 0 | 0 | 0 | 0 | 2 | 0 |
| Kwami Hodouto | Togo | 1999–2000 | 1 (1) | 0 | 0 | 0 | 1 | 0 | 0 | 0 | 0 | 0 | 2 (1) | 0 |
| Stewart Holden | England | 1959–1965 | 28 | 2 | 0 | 0 | 2 | 0 | 0 | 0 | 0 | 0 | 30 | 2 |
| Andy Holdsworth | England | 2003–2009 | 214 (17) | 6 | 12 | 1 | 8 | 1 | 4 (1) | 0 | 5 | 0 | 243 (18) | 8 |
| Chris Holland | England | 2000–2004 | 113 (7) | 2 | 5 | 0 | 4 | 0 | 7 (1) | 1 | 2 | 0 | 131 (8) | 3 |
| Duane Holmes | United States | 2013–2016; 2021–2023 | 66 (40) | 10 | 2 (4) | 1 | 3 (2) | 0 | 0 | 0 | 2 (1) | 0 | 73 (48) | 11 |
| Ian Holmes | England | 1977–1980 | 65 (8) | 21 | 1 | 0 | 6 | 2 | 0 | 0 | 0 | 0 | 72 (8) | 23 |
| Micky Holmes | England | 1988–1989 | 3 (4) | 0 | 0 | 0 | 1 | 0 | 0 | 0 | 0 | 0 | 4 (4) | 0 |
| Norman Holmes | England | 1913–1914 | 3 | 0 | 0 | 0 | 0 | 0 | 0 | 0 | 0 | 0 | 3 | 0 |
| Tareiq Holmes-Dennis | England | 2016–2018 | 7 (2) | 0 | 4 | 0 | 0 | 0 | 0 | 0 | 0 (2) | 0 | 11 (4) | 0 |
| Grant Holt | England | 2014 | 14 (1) | 2 | 0 | 0 | 0 | 0 | 0 | 0 | 0 | 0 | 14 (1) | 2 |
| Ray Holt | England | 1958–1965 | 16 | 0 | 2 | 0 | 5 | 2 | 0 | 0 | 0 | 0 | 23 | 2 |
| Barry Horne | Wales | 1997–2000 | 55 (9) | 1 | 2 | 0 | 7 | 0 | 0 | 0 | 0 | 0 | 64 (9) | 1 |
| Tim Hotte | England | 1981–1983 | 14 (2) | 4 | 0 | 0 | 0 | 0 | 0 | 0 | 0 | 0 | 14 (2) | 4 |
| Stan Howard | England | 1952–1960 | 62 | 13 | 2 | 0 | 0 | 0 | 0 | 0 | 0 | 0 | 64 | 13 |
| George Howe | England | 1945–1954 | 40 | 0 | 1 | 0 | 0 | 0 | 0 | 0 | 0 | 0 | 41 | 0 |
| Jack Howe | England | 1949–1951 | 29 | 1 | 1 | 0 | 0 | 0 | 0 | 0 | 0 | 0 | 30 | 1 |
| Peter Howey | England | 1974–1979 | 20 (2) | 3 | 0 | 0 | 6 | 0 | 0 | 0 | 0 | 0 | 26 (2) | 3 |
| James Howie | England | 1910–1913 | 84 | 18 | 3 | 0 | 0 | 0 | 0 | 0 | 0 | 0 | 87 | 18 |
| Bobby Hoy | England | 1967–1975 | 140 (4) | 18 | 7 | 1 | 8 | 0 | 0 | 0 | 0 | 0 | 155 (4) | 19 |
| Mark Hudson | England | 2005–2007 | 55 (6) | 6 | 4 | 0 | 2 | 0 | 0 | 0 | 2 | 0 | 63 (6) | 6 |
| Mark A. Hudson | England | 2014–2017 | 97 (5) | 5 | 7 | 0 | 0 | 0 | 0 | 0 | 0 | 0 | 104 (5) | 5 |
| Ian Hughes | Wales | 2003–2004 | 12 (1) | 1 | 0 | 0 | 1 | 0 | 1 | 0 | 0 | 0 | 14 (1) | 1 |
| Joe Hulme | England | 1938 | 8 | 0 | 2 | 0 | 0 | 0 | 0 | 0 | 0 | 0 | 10 | 0 |
| Ronald Humpston | England | 1951–1953 | 5 | 0 | 0 | 0 | 0 | 0 | 0 | 0 | 0 | 0 | 5 | 0 |
| Jack Hunt | England | 2009–2013 | 97 (7) | 2 | 4 | 0 | 4 (1) | 1 | 2 | 0 | 5 (1) | 1 | 112 (9) | 4 |
| Donald Hunter | England | 1945–1951 | 26 | 1 | 0 | 0 | 0 | 0 | 0 | 0 | 0 | 0 | 26 | 1 |
| Chris Hurst | England | 1997–1998 | 1 (2) | 0 | 0 | 0 | 0 (1) | 0 | 0 | 0 | 0 | 0 | 1 (3) | 0 |
| James Husband | England | 2016 | 10 (1) | 0 | 0 (1) | 0 | 0 | 0 | 0 | 0 | 0 | 0 | 10 (2) | 0 |
| Horace Husler | England | 1912–1913 | 1 | 0 | 0 | 0 | 0 | 0 | 0 | 0 | 0 | 0 | 1 | 0 |
| Chris Hutchings | England | 1987–1990 | 110 | 10 | 8 | 0 | 6 | 0 | 0 | 0 | 0 | 0 | 124 | 10 |
| George Hutchinson | England | 1947–1948 | 1 | 0 | 0 | 0 | 0 | 0 | 0 | 0 | 0 | 0 | 1 | 0 |
| Geoff Hutt | England | 1965–1976 | 245 | 4 | 21 | 0 | 11 | 0 | 0 | 0 | 0 | 0 | 277 | 4 |
| Emyr Huws | Wales | 2015–2016 | 27 (3) | 5 | 1 | 0 | 0 | 0 | 0 | 0 | 0 | 0 | 28 (3) | 5 |
| Jerel Ifil | England | 2002 | 1 (1) | 0 | 0 | 0 | 0 | 0 | 0 | 0 | 2 | 0 | 3 (1) | 0 |
| Jeremy Illingworth | England | 1993–1999 | 2 (1) | 0 | 0 | 0 | 0 | 0 | 0 | 0 | 0 | 0 | 2 (1) | 0 |
| Tom Ince | England | 2017–2018 | 27 (6) | 2 | 2 | 1 | 1 (1) | 0 | 0 | 0 | 0 | 0 | 30 (7) | 3 |
| Simon Ireland | England | 1990–1992 | 10 (9) | 0 | 0 (1) | 0 | 1 | 1 | 1 (1) | 0 | 0 | 0 | 12 (11) | 1 |
| Kenny Irons | England | 1999–2003 | 120 (28) | 11 | 3 | 0 | 9 | 2 | 5 (1) | 0 | 2 | 0 | 139 (29) | 13 |
| Jimmy Isaac | England | 1935–1945 | 33 | 8 | 7 | 2 | 0 | 0 | 0 | 0 | 0 | 0 | 40 | 10 |
| Ernie Islip | England | 1911–1923 | 152 | 44 | 21 | 8 | 0 | 0 | 0 | 0 | 0 | 0 | 173 | 52 |
| Alex Jackson | Scotland | 1925–1930 | 179 | 70 | 24 | 19 | 0 | 0 | 0 | 0 | 0 | 0 | 203 | 89 |
| Mark Jackson | England | 1998 | 5 | 0 | 0 | 0 | 0 | 0 | 0 | 0 | 0 | 0 | 5 | 0 |
| Peter Jackson | England | 1990–1994 | 152 (3) | 3 | 13 | 1 | 11 | 0 | 16 | 1 | 2 | 0 | 193 (3) | 5 |
| Reece James | England | 2015 | 6 | 1 | 0 | 0 | 0 | 0 | 0 | 0 | 0 | 0 | 6 | 1 |
| Sidney James | England | 1913–1917 | 12 | 2 | 2 | 0 | 0 | 0 | 0 | 0 | 0 | 0 | 14 | 2 |
| Johnny Jameson | Northern Ireland | 1977–1978 | 1 | 0 | 0 | 0 | 0 | 0 | 0 | 0 | 0 | 0 | 1 | 0 |
| Joe Jee | England | 1909–1915 | 209 | 43 | 15 | 3 | 0 | 0 | 0 | 0 | 0 | 0 | 224 | 46 |
| Steve Jenkins | Wales | 1995–2003 | 257 (1) | 4 | 14 | 0 | 18 | 0 | 4 | 0 | 1 | 0 | 294 (1) | 4 |
| Dennis Jennings | England | 1930–1932 | 33 | 5 | 0 | 0 | 0 | 0 | 0 | 0 | 0 | 0 | 33 | 5 |
| Ronnie Jepson | England | 1993–1996 | 95 (12) | 36 | 4 | 3 | 6 (1) | 2 | 4 | 1 | 3 | 0 | 112 (13) | 42 |
| Phil Jevons | England | 2007–2010 | 29 (15) | 9 | 4 (1) | 2 | 0 (1) | 0 | 0 | 0 | 0 | 0 | 33 (17) | 11 |
| Damien Johnson (1st spell) | Northern Ireland | 2010–2011 | 14 (2) | 0 | 3 | 0 | 1 (1) | 0 | 2 | 0 | 0 | 0 | 20 (3) | 0 |
| Damien Johnson (2nd spell) | Northern Ireland | 2011–2012 | 16 (2) | 0 | 0 | 0 | 0 | 0 | 0 | 0 | 3 | 0 | 19 (2) | 0 |
| Grant Johnson | Scotland | 1997–2000 | 64 (1) | 5 | 7 | 0 | 4 | 1 | 0 | 0 | 0 | 0 | 75 (1) | 6 |
| Jack Johnson | England | 1936–1938 | 18 | 2 | 0 | 0 | 0 | 0 | 0 | 0 | 0 | 0 | 18 | 2 |
| Kevin Johnson | England | 1976–1978 | 80 (1) | 23 | 1 (1) | 0 | 4 | 0 | 0 | 0 | 0 | 0 | 85 (2) | 23 |
| Billy Johnston | England | 1920–1924 | 46 | 6 | 4 | 1 | 0 | 0 | 0 | 0 | 0 | 0 | 50 | 7 |
| Alan Jones | England | 1968–1973 | 30 (2) | 0 | 2 (1) | 0 | 1 | 0 | 0 | 0 | 0 | 0 | 33 (3) | 0 |
| Chris Jones | England | 1976–1977 | 9 (5) | 2 | 1 (1) | 0 | 1 (1) | 0 | 0 | 0 | 0 | 0 | 11 (7) | 2 |
| Gwyn Jones | Wales | 1933–1934 | 1 | 0 | 0 | 0 | 0 | 0 | 0 | 0 | 0 | 0 | 1 | 0 |
| Joey Jones | Wales | 1985–1987 | 67 (1) | 3 | 2 | 0 | 6 | 1 | 0 | 0 | 0 | 0 | 75 (1) | 4 |
| Paul Jones | England | 1983–1985 | 73 | 8 | 0 | 0 | 10 | 3 | 0 | 0 | 0 | 0 | 83 | 11 |
| Robert Jones | England | 1921–1922 | 2 | 1 | 0 | 0 | 0 | 0 | 0 | 0 | 0 | 0 | 2 | 1 |
| Steve Jones | Northern Ireland | 2008 | 2 (2) | 0 | 0 | 0 | 0 | 0 | 0 | 0 | 0 | 0 | 2 (2) | 0 |
| Stephen Jordan | England | 2011 | 6 | 0 | 0 | 0 | 0 | 0 | 0 | 0 | 0 | 0 | 6 | 0 |
| Mathias Jørgensen | Denmark | 2017–2019 | 62 | 3 | 3 | 0 | 0 | 0 | 0 | 0 | 0 | 0 | 65 | 3 |
| David Joy | England | 1962–1967 | 1 | 0 | 0 | 0 | 0 | 0 | 0 | 0 | 0 | 0 | 1 | 0 |
| Lukas Jutkiewicz | Poland | 2009 | 6 (1) | 0 | 0 | 0 | 0 | 0 | 0 | 0 | 0 | 0 | 6 (1) | 0 |
| Elias Kachunga | DR Congo | 2016–2020 | 101 (16) | 16 | 2 (1) | 0 | 4 (1) | 1 | 0 | 0 | 3 | 0 | 110 (18) | 17 |
| Tamás Kádár | Hungary | 2011 | 2 | 0 | 0 | 0 | 0 | 0 | 0 | 0 | 0 | 0 | 2 | 0 |
| Malvin Kamara | Sierra Leone | 2007–2009 | 33 (12) | 3 | 3 (2) | 2 | 1 (2) | 0 | 1 | 0 | 0 | 0 | 38 (16) | 5 |
| Florian Kamberi | Albania | 2023 | 0 (1) | 0 | 0 (1) | 1 | 0 | 0 | 0 | 0 | 0 | 0 | 0 (2) | 1 |
| Antony Kay | England | 2009–2012 | 84 (11) | 10 | 8 | 1 | 2 (1) | 0 | 7 (1) | 0 | 5 | 1 | 106 (13) | 12 |
| Peter Kaye | England | 1996–1998 | 0 (1) | 0 | 0 | 0 | 0 | 0 | 0 | 0 | 0 | 0 | 0 (1) | 0 |
| Bob Kelly | England | 1927–1932 | 186 | 39 | 27 | 3 | 0 | 0 | 0 | 0 | 0 | 0 | 213 | 42 |
| Gerry Kelly | England | 1929–1932 | 37 | 15 | 1 | 0 | 0 | 0 | 0 | 0 | 0 | 0 | 38 | 15 |
| John Kelly (1st spell) | England | 1990 | 9 (1) | 1 | 0 | 0 | 0 | 0 | 0 | 0 | 0 | 0 | 9 (1) | 1 |
| John Kelly (2nd spell) | England | 1991–1992 | 16 (2) | 0 | 1 | 0 | 0 | 0 | 1 (2) | 0 | 2 | 0 | 20 (4) | 0 |
| Laurie Kelly | England | 1950–1957 | 225 | 2 | 14 | 0 | 0 | 0 | 0 | 0 | 0 | 0 | 239 | 2 |
| Martin Kelly | England | 2009 | 7 | 1 | 0 | 0 | 0 | 0 | 0 | 0 | 0 | 0 | 7 | 1 |
| Mick Kennedy | England | 1980–1982 | 80 (1) | 9 | 8 | 0 | 4 (2) | 0 | 0 | 0 | 0 | 0 | 92 (3) | 9 |
| Sandy Kennon | South Africa | 1956–1958 | 78 | 0 | 2 | 0 | 0 | 0 | 0 | 0 | 0 | 0 | 80 | 0 |
| Richard Keogh (1st spell) | Republic of Ireland | 2007 | 9 | 1 | 0 | 0 | 0 | 0 | 1 | 0 | 0 | 0 | 10 | 1 |
| Richard Keogh (2nd spell) | Republic of Ireland | 2021 | 21 | 0 | 0 | 0 | 0 | 0 | 0 | 0 | 0 | 0 | 21 | 0 |
| Jim Kerray | Scotland | 1960–1962 | 54 | 12 | 2 | 1 | 4 | 0 | 0 | 0 | 0 | 0 | 60 | 13 |
| Kaine Kesler-Hayden | England | 2022–2023 | 9 (5) | 1 | 1 | 0 | 0 | 0 | 0 | 0 | 0 | 0 | 10 (5) | 1 |
| Kevin Kilbane | Republic of Ireland | 2011 | 23 (1) | 2 | 2 | 0 | 0 | 0 | 2 | 0 | 3 | 1 | 30 (1) | 3 |
| Shane Killock | England | 2007–2009 | 1 | 0 | 0 | 0 | 0 | 0 | 0 | 0 | 0 | 0 | 1 | 0 |
| Steve Kindon | England | 1979–1981 | 69 (4) | 35 | 4 | 0 | 5 | 2 | 0 | 0 | 0 | 0 | 78 (4) | 37 |
| Andy King | Wales | 2020 | 6 (8) | 0 | 0 | 0 | 0 | 0 | 0 | 0 | 0 | 0 | 6 (8) | 0 |
| Paul Kirkham | England | 1987–1989 | 0 (1) | 0 | 0 | 0 | 0 | 0 | 0 | 0 | 0 | 0 | 0 (1) | 0 |
| Leon Knight | England | 2001–2002 | 31 | 16 | 2 | 1 | 0 | 0 | 4 | 0 | 0 | 0 | 37 | 17 |
| Terence Kongolo (1st spell) | Netherlands | 2018 | 11 (2) | 0 | 4 | 0 | 0 | 0 | 0 | 0 | 0 | 0 | 15 (2) | 0 |
| Terence Kongolo (2nd spell) | Netherlands | 2018–2020 | 41 (1) | 1 | 0 | 0 | 0 | 0 | 0 | 0 | 0 | 0 | 41 (1) | 1 |
| Rob Kozluk | England | 2000 | 14 | 0 | 0 | 0 | 0 | 0 | 0 | 0 | 0 | 0 | 14 | 0 |
| Dick Krzywicki | Wales | 1970–1974 | 39 (8) | 7 | 3 (1) | 1 | 0 | 0 | 0 | 0 | 0 | 0 | 42 (9) | 8 |
| Kevin Kyle | Scotland | 2000 | 0 (4) | 0 | 0 | 0 | 0 | 0 | 0 | 0 | 0 | 0 | 0 (4) | 0 |
| Gianfranco Labarthe Tome | Peru | 2002–2003 | 0 (3) | 0 | 0 | 0 | 0 | 0 | 0 | 0 | 0 | 0 | 0 (3) | 0 |
| Kevin Lampkin | England | 1992–1994 | 13 | 0 | 0 | 0 | 1 | 0 | 0 | 0 | 0 | 0 | 14 | 0 |
| Tommy Lang | Scotland | 1934–1935 | 24 | 5 | 2 | 1 | 0 | 0 | 0 | 0 | 0 | 0 | 26 | 6 |
| Mick Laverick (1st spell) | England | 1979–1982 | 74 | 9 | 5 (1) | 3 | 6 | 0 | 0 | 0 | 0 | 0 | 85 (1) | 12 |
| Mick Laverick (2nd spell) | England | 1983 | 2 | 0 | 0 | 0 | 0 | 0 | 0 | 0 | 0 | 0 | 2 | 0 |
| Denis Law | Scotland | 1956–1960 | 81 | 16 | 10 | 3 | 0 | 0 | 0 | 0 | 0 | 0 | 91 | 19 |
| Brian Laws | England | 1983–1985 | 56 | 1 | 3 | 0 | 7 | 0 | 0 | 0 | 0 | 0 | 66 | 1 |
| David Lawson | England | 1969–1972 | 51 | 0 | 7 | 0 | 1 | 0 | 0 | 0 | 0 | 0 | 59 | 0 |
| Ian Lawson | England | 1995–1999 | 13 (29) | 5 | 1 (1) | 0 | 1 (4) | 0 | 0 | 0 | 0 | 0 | 15 (34) | 5 |
| Jimmy Lawson | England | 1968–1976 | 234 (11) | 42 | 14 | 4 | 6 (1) | 0 | 0 | 0 | 0 | 0 | 254 (12) | 46 |
| Bob Ledger | England | 1954–1962 | 58 | 7 | 2 | 0 | 2 | 0 | 0 | 0 | 0 | 0 | 62 | 7 |
| Robert Ledger | England | 1913–1915 | 1 | 0 | 0 | 0 | 0 | 0 | 0 | 0 | 0 | 0 | 1 | 0 |
| Alan Lee | Republic of Ireland | 2010–2013 | 36 (44) | 9 | 5 (3) | 1 | 0 (3) | 0 | 5 (1) | 2 | 0 (4) | 0 | 46 (55) | 12 |
| Billy Legg | England | 1963–1972 | 54 (2) | 4 | 2 | 0 | 2 | 0 | 0 | 0 | 0 | 0 | 58 (2) | 4 |
| Tony Leighton | England | 1964–1968 | 89 (1) | 40 | 3 | 2 | 4 | 2 | 0 | 0 | 0 | 0 | 96 (1) | 44 |
| Dudley Lewis | Wales | 1989–1992 | 32 (2) | 0 | 3 | 0 | 6 | 0 | 3 | 0 | 0 | 0 | 44 (2) | 0 |
| Kevin Lewis | England | 1963–1965 | 45 | 13 | 2 | 0 | 5 | 2 | 0 | 0 | 0 | 0 | 52 | 15 |
| Wilf Lewis | Wales | 1928–1931 | 15 | 7 | 2 | 0 | 0 | 0 | 0 | 0 | 0 | 0 | 17 | 7 |
| Tom Lilley | England | 1922–1923 | 3 | 0 | 0 | 0 | 0 | 0 | 0 | 0 | 0 | 0 | 3 | 0 |
| Mark Lillis | England | 1977–1985 | 199 (7) | 56 | 19 (1) | 4 | 16 | 3 | 0 | 0 | 0 | 0 | 234 (8) | 63 |
| Dennis Lindsay | South Africa | 1937–1938 | 1 | 0 | 0 | 0 | 0 | 0 | 0 | 0 | 0 | 0 | 1 | 0 |
| Harry Linley | England | 1912–1921 | 48 | 1 | 3 | 0 | 0 | 0 | 0 | 0 | 0 | 0 | 51 | 1 |
| Anthony Lloyd | England | 2003–2006 | 40 (2) | 3 | 2 | 0 | 0 | 0 | 4 | 0 | 3 | 0 | 49 (2) | 3 |
| Joe Lodge | England | 1941–1948 | 2 | 0 | 0 | 0 | 0 | 0 | 0 | 0 | 0 | 0 | 2 | 0 |
| Richard Logan | England | 1993–1995 | 35 (10) | 1 | 1 | 0 | 3 | 0 | 9 | 1 | 0 | 0 | 48 (10) | 2 |
| Joe Lolley | England | 2014–2018 | 39 (41) | 9 | 6 (2) | 0 | 2 (1) | 2 | 0 | 0 | 0 | 0 | 47 (44) | 11 |
| Cristian López | Spain | 2013–2014 | 0 (2) | 0 | 0 (1) | 0 | 0 (1) | 0 | 0 | 0 | 0 | 0 | 0 (4) | 0 |
| Jonas Lössl (1st spell) | Denmark | 2017–2019 | 68 (1) | 0 | 2 | 0 | 1 | 0 | 0 | 0 | 0 | 0 | 71 (1) | 0 |
| Jonas Lössl (2nd spell) | Denmark | 2020 | 15 | 0 | 0 | 0 | 0 | 0 | 0 | 0 | 0 | 0 | 15 | 0 |
| Gordon Low | Scotland | 1955–1961 | 67 | 6 | 0 | 0 | 1 | 0 | 0 | 0 | 0 | 0 | 68 | 6 |
| Chris Löwe | Germany | 2016–2019 | 81 (12) | 2 | 2 (1) | 0 | 1 (1) | 0 | 0 | 0 | 3 | 0 | 87 (14) | 2 |
| Chris Lucketti (1st spell) | England | 1999–2001 | 69 | 1 | 0 | 0 | 7 | 1 | 0 | 0 | 0 | 0 | 76 | 2 |
| Chris Lucketti (2nd spell) | England | 2008–2010 | 12 (1) | 0 | 0 | 0 | 2 | 0 | 1 | 0 | 0 | 0 | 15 (1) | 0 |
| Charlie Luke | England | 1931–1936 | 130 | 40 | 13 | 7 | 0 | 0 | 0 | 0 | 0 | 0 | 143 | 47 |
| Frank Lumsden | England | 1934–1935 | 1 | 0 | 0 | 0 | 0 | 0 | 0 | 0 | 0 | 0 | 1 | 0 |
| Fred Lunn | England | 1920–1921 | 6 | 2 | 0 | 0 | 0 | 0 | 0 | 0 | 0 | 0 | 6 | 2 |
| Joel Lynch | Wales | 2012–2016 | 115 (7) | 8 | 2 | 0 | 4 | 1 | 0 | 0 | 0 | 0 | 121 (7) | 9 |
| Billy Lynn | England | 1965–1967 | 4 | 0 | 0 | 0 | 0 | 0 | 0 | 0 | 0 | 0 | 4 | 0 |
| Joe Lynn | England | 1947–1950 | 5 | 0 | 0 | 0 | 0 | 0 | 0 | 0 | 0 | 0 | 5 | 0 |
| Dave Lyon | England | 1971–1974 | 24 (1) | 0 | 1 | 0 | 1 | 0 | 0 | 0 | 0 | 0 | 26 (1) | 0 |
| Alf Lythgoe | England | 1934–1938 | 73 | 42 | 6 | 4 | 0 | 0 | 0 | 0 | 0 | 0 | 79 | 46 |
| Paul Macari | England | 2001–2003 | 0 (11) | 0 | 0 | 0 | 0 (2) | 0 | 0 (1) | 0 | 0 | 0 | 0 (14) | 0 |
| James Macauley | Ireland | 1910–1913 | 95 | 32 | 2 | 2 | 0 | 0 | 0 | 0 | 0 | 0 | 97 | 34 |
| Willie MacFadyen | Scotland | 1936–1939 | 48 | 18 | 6 | 1 | 0 | 0 | 0 | 0 | 0 | 0 | 54 | 19 |
| Ally MacLeod | Scotland | 1974 | 3 (1) | 1 | 0 | 0 | 0 | 0 | 0 | 0 | 0 | 0 | 3 (1) | 1 |
| Carl Madrick | England | 1987–1988 | 3 (5) | 1 | 0 | 0 | 0 | 0 | 0 | 0 | 0 | 0 | 3 (5) | 1 |
| Peter Maguire | England | 1989–1991 | 1 (6) | 1 | 0 | 0 | 0 | 0 | 0 | 0 | 0 | 0 | 1 (6) | 1 |
| Jack Mahon | England | 1938–1945 | 5 | 0 | 1 | 1 | 0 | 0 | 0 | 0 | 0 | 0 | 6 | 1 |
| Brian Mahoney | England | 1969–1972 | 18 (2) | 2 | 2 | 1 | 0 | 0 | 0 | 0 | 0 | 0 | 20 (2) | 3 |
| Lloyd Maitland | England | 1974–1977 | 31 (8) | 2 | 3 | 0 | 4 | 0 | 0 | 0 | 0 | 0 | 38 (8) | 2 |
| Radosław Majewski | Poland | 2014–2015 | 3 (5) | 0 | 0 | 0 | 0 (1) | 0 | 0 | 0 | 0 | 0 | 3 (6) | 0 |
| Lee Makel | England | 1995–1998 | 62 (3) | 5 | 6 (1) | 0 | 7 | 0 | 0 | 0 | 0 | 0 | 75 (4) | 5 |
| Albert Malam | England | 1934–1936 | 21 | 11 | 2 | 0 | 0 | 0 | 0 | 0 | 0 | 0 | 23 | 11 |
| Scott Malone | England | 2017–2018 | 12 (10) | 0 | 2 (2) | 0 | 2 | 0 | 0 | 0 | 0 | 0 | 16 (12) | 0 |
| Dave Mangnall | England | 1929–1934 | 79 | 61 | 11 | 12 | 0 | 0 | 0 | 0 | 0 | 0 | 90 | 73 |
| Frank Mann | England | 1912–1923 | 201 | 68 | 25 | 7 | 0 | 0 | 0 | 0 | 0 | 0 | 226 | 75 |
| Elvis Manu | Ghana | 2016 | 0 (5) | 0 | 0 | 0 | 0 | 0 | 0 | 0 | 0 | 0 | 0 (5) | 0 |
| Martyn Margetson | Wales | 1999–2002 | 47 (1) | 0 | 2 | 0 | 1 | 0 | 6 | 0 | 2 | 0 | 58 (1) | 0 |
| Len Marlow | England | 1922 | 1 | 0 | 0 | 0 | 0 | 0 | 0 | 0 | 0 | 0 | 1 | 0 |
| Jackie Marriott | England | 1955–1957 | 38 | 4 | 1 | 0 | 0 | 0 | 0 | 0 | 0 | 0 | 39 | 4 |
| Chris Marsden | England | 1988–1994 | 113 (8) | 9 | 6 (2) | 0 | 15 (1) | 0 | 10 | 0 | 0 | 0 | 144 (11) | 9 |
| Brian Marshall | England | 1971–1975 | 30 (2) | 0 | 0 | 0 | 0 | 0 | 0 | 0 | 0 | 0 | 30 (2) | 0 |
| Lee A. Martin | England | 1997 | 2 (1) | 0 | 0 | 0 | 1 | 0 | 0 | 0 | 0 | 0 | 3 (1) | 0 |
| Lee B. Martin | England | 1985–1992 | 54 | 0 | 4 | 0 | 0 | 0 | 5 | 0 | 0 | 0 | 63 | 0 |
| William Martin | England | 1911–1912 | 5 | 0 | 0 | 0 | 0 | 0 | 0 | 0 | 0 | 0 | 5 | 0 |
| Craig Maskell | England | 1988–1990 | 86 (1) | 43 | 8 | 3 | 6 | 4 | 7 | 4 | 0 | 0 | 107 (1) | 54 |
| Keith Mason | England | 1982–1986 | 30 | 0 | 2 | 0 | 0 | 0 | 0 | 0 | 0 | 0 | 32 | 0 |
| Les Massie | Scotland | 1953–1966 | 334 (1) | 100 | 20 | 6 | 8 | 2 | 0 | 0 | 0 | 0 | 362 (1) | 108 |
| Karim Matmour | Algeria | 2016 | 7 (9) | 1 | 0 | 0 | 0 | 0 | 0 | 0 | 0 | 0 | 7 (9) | 1 |
| Dwayne Mattis | Republic of Ireland | 1999–2004 | 50 (19) | 2 | 3 (1) | 0 | 1 (2) | 0 | 5 | 1 | 0 | 0 | 59 (22) | 3 |
| Andy May | England | 1987–1990 | 112 (2) | 5 | 10 | 1 | 5 | 0 | 3 | 0 | 0 | 0 | 130 (2) | 6 |
| David May | England | 1999–2000 | 1 | 0 | 0 | 0 | 0 | 0 | 0 | 0 | 0 | 0 | 1 | 0 |
| Isaac Mbenza | Belgium | 2018–2021 | 38 (25) | 6 | 0 (1) | 0 | 2 (1) | 0 | 0 | 0 | 0 | 0 | 39 (27) | 6 |
| Luke Mbete | England | 2022–2023 | 3 (3) | 0 | 0 | 0 | 0 | 0 | 0 | 0 | 0 | 0 | 3 (3) | 0 |
| John McAliskey | Republic of Ireland | 2004–2007 | 15 (28) | 7 | 0 | 0 | 0 (1) | 0 | 1 (1) | 1 | 0 (2) | 0 | 16 (32) | 8 |
| Jim McCaffrey | England | 1977–1978 | 23 (4) | 0 | 0 (1) | 0 | 4 | 0 | 0 | 0 | 0 | 0 | 27 (5) | 0 |
| Andy McCall | Scotland | 1939 | 5 | 0 | 3 | 1 | 0 | 0 | 0 | 0 | 0 | 0 | 8 | 1 |
| John McCann | Scotland | 1960–1962 | 20 | 1 | 0 | 0 | 1 | 1 | 0 | 0 | 0 | 0 | 21 | 2 |
| Jamie McCombe | England | 2010–2012 | 51 (3) | 8 | 3 (2) | 1 | 4 | 0 | 4 | 0 | 0 (1) | 0 | 62 (6) | 9 |
| John McCombe | England | 2003–2007 | 10 (3) | 0 | 1 | 0 | 1 | 0 | 4 | 0 | 0 | 0 | 16 (3) | 0 |
| Sandy McCubbin | Scotland | 1910–1912 | 11 | 5 | 5 | 2 | 0 | 0 | 0 | 0 | 0 | 0 | 16 | 7 |
| Brian McDermott | England | 1986 | 4 | 1 | 0 | 0 | 0 | 0 | 0 | 0 | 0 | 0 | 4 | 1 |
| Donal McDermott | Republic of Ireland | 2011–2012 | 6 (3) | 0 | 1 | 0 | 2 | 0 | 2 | 1 | 0 | 0 | 11 (3) | 1 |
| Seamous McDonagh | Republic of Ireland | 1988 | 6 | 0 | 0 | 0 | 0 | 0 | 0 | 0 | 0 | 0 | 6 | 0 |
| Scott McDonald | Australia | 2002 | 7 (6) | 1 | 0 | 0 | 0 (1) | 0 | 0 | 0 | 0 | 0 | 7 (7) | 1 |
| Don McEvoy | England | 1947–1954 | 148 | 3 | 7 | 0 | 0 | 0 | 0 | 0 | 0 | 0 | 155 | 3 |
| Bill McGarry | England | 1951–1961 | 363 | 25 | 18 | 1 | 0 | 0 | 0 | 0 | 0 | 0 | 381 | 26 |
| Grahame McGifford | England | 1970–1976 | 41 (1) | 0 | 1 | 0 | 2 | 0 | 0 | 0 | 0 | 0 | 44 (1) | 0 |
| Jimmy McGill | Scotland | 1967–1971 | 161 (3) | 8 | 10 | 0 | 9 (1) | 0 | 0 | 0 | 0 | 0 | 180 (4) | 8 |
| Billy McGinley | Scotland | 1974–1975 | 11 (4) | 1 | 0 | 0 | 2 (1) | 1 | 0 | 0 | 0 | 0 | 13 (5) | 2 |
| Frank McGrellis | Scotland | 1978 | 4 (1) | 0 | 0 | 0 | 2 | 0 | 0 | 0 | 0 | 0 | 6 (1) | 0 |
| Kevin McHale | England | 1956–1968 | 345 | 60 | 24 | 5 | 6 | 3 | 0 | 0 | 0 | 0 | 375 | 68 |
| Ian McInerney | England | 1988–1989 | 5 (5) | 1 | 0 | 0 | 0 | 0 | 0 (1) | 0 | 0 | 0 | 5 (6) | 1 |
| Martin McIntosh | Scotland | 2005–2007 | 44 (4) | 4 | 1 | 0 | 1 | 0 | 0 | 0 | 2 | 0 | 48 (4) | 4 |
| Colin McKay | Scotland | 1920–1922 | 18 | 2 | 0 | 0 | 0 | 0 | 0 | 0 | 0 | 0 | 18 | 2 |
| Johnny McKenna | Northern Ireland | 1948–1954 | 134 | 8 | 5 | 1 | 0 | 0 | 0 | 0 | 0 | 0 | 139 | 9 |
| William McLaren | Scotland | 1913–1915 | 31 | 2 | 1 | 0 | 0 | 0 | 0 | 0 | 0 | 0 | 32 | 2 |
| George McLean | Scotland | 1930–1935 | 120 | 44 | 11 | 4 | 0 | 0 | 0 | 0 | 0 | 0 | 131 | 48 |
| Brendan McManus | Republic of Ireland | 1945–1947 | 1 | 0 | 0 | 0 | 0 | 0 | 0 | 0 | 0 | 0 | 1 | 0 |
| Bob McNab | England | 1962–1966 | 68 | 0 | 3 | 0 | 5 | 0 | 0 | 0 | 0 | 0 | 76 | 0 |
| Neil McNab | Scotland | 1992 | 11 | 0 | 0 | 0 | 0 | 0 | 1 | 0 | 0 | 0 | 12 | 0 |
| Alan McNeill | Northern Ireland | 1968–1969 | 1 (1) | 0 | 0 | 0 | 0 | 0 | 0 | 0 | 0 | 0 | 1 (1) | 0 |
| Harry McShane | Scotland | 1946–1947 | 15 | 1 | 0 | 0 | 0 | 0 | 0 | 0 | 0 | 0 | 15 | 1 |
| Willie McStay | Scotland | 1987–1988 | 4 (5) | 0 | 0 | 0 | 0 | 0 | 1 | 0 | 0 | 0 | 5 (5) | 0 |
| Tommy Meads | England | 1927–1928 | 40 | 2 | 2 | 0 | 0 | 0 | 0 | 0 | 0 | 0 | 42 | 2 |
| Mick Meagan | Republic of Ireland | 1964–1968 | 118 (1) | 1 | 6 | 0 | 7 | 0 | 0 | 0 | 0 | 0 | 131 (1) | 1 |
| Ian Measham | England | 1981–1986 | 17 | 0 | 0 | 0 | 0 | 0 | 0 | 0 | 0 | 0 | 17 | 0 |
| Brett Mellor | England | 1978–1980 | 1 | 0 | 0 | 0 | 0 | 0 | 0 | 0 | 0 | 0 | 1 | 0 |
| Junior Mendes | Montserrat | 2004–2006 | 14 (16) | 5 | 1 | 0 | 1 (1) | 0 | 1 | 1 | 0 | 0 | 17 (17) | 6 |
| Billy Mercer | England | 1924–1928 | 71 | 0 | 8 | 0 | 0 | 0 | 0 | 0 | 0 | 0 | 79 | 0 |
| George Metcalf | England | 1910–1911 | 15 | 0 | 2 | 0 | 0 | 0 | 0 | 0 | 0 | 0 | 17 | 0 |
| Vic Metcalfe | England | 1945–1958 | 434 | 87 | 25 | 3 | 0 | 0 | 0 | 0 | 0 | 0 | 459 | 90 |
| Michael Midwood | England | 1997–1998 | 0 (1) | 0 | 0 | 0 | 0 | 0 | 0 | 0 | 0 | 0 | 0 (1) | 0 |
| Ray Mielczarek | Wales | 1967–1971 | 25 (1) | 1 | 2 | 0 | 1 | 0 | 0 | 0 | 0 | 0 | 28 (1) | 1 |
| Ishmael Miller | England | 2015–2016 | 21 (13) | 4 | 0 (2) | 0 | 1 | 0 | 0 | 0 | 0 | 0 | 22 (15) | 4 |
| Tommy Miller | England | 2011–2012 | 24 (2) | 1 | 1 | 0 | 2 | 0 | 1 | 1 | 3 | 0 | 31 (2) | 2 |
| Harry Mills | England | 1948–1955 | 157 | 0 | 3 | 0 | 0 | 0 | 0 | 0 | 0 | 0 | 160 | 0 |
| Willie Mills | Scotland | 1938–1940 | 27 | 7 | 4 | 0 | 0 | 0 | 0 | 0 | 0 | 0 | 31 | 7 |
| Ernie Millward | England | 1910–1913 | 1 | 0 | 1 | 0 | 0 | 0 | 0 | 0 | 0 | 0 | 2 | 0 |
| John Milner | England | 1959–1963 | 17 | 0 | 0 | 0 | 2 | 1 | 0 | 0 | 0 | 0 | 19 | 1 |
| Charlie Milnes | England | 1912–1913 | 14 | 0 | 0 | 0 | 0 | 0 | 0 | 0 | 0 | 0 | 14 | 0 |
| David Mirfin | England | 2003–2008 | 141 (20) | 9 | 6 (2) | 0 | 4 | 0 | 2 (1) | 2 | 3 | 1 | 156 (23) | 12 |
| Graham Mitchell | England | 1986–1994 | 235 (9) | 2 | 27 | 1 | 13 (2) | 1 | 22 | 1 | 2 | 0 | 299 (11) | 5 |
| Ken Monkou | Suriname | 1999–2001 | 21 | 1 | 0 | 0 | 4 | 0 | 0 | 0 | 0 | 0 | 25 | 1 |
| Thomas Mooney | Northern Ireland | 1990–1993 | 1 | 0 | 0 | 0 | 0 | 0 | 2 | 0 | 0 | 0 | 3 | 0 |
| Aaron Mooy | Australia | 2016–2020 | 102 (9) | 11 | 1 (2) | 0 | 1 (2) | 0 | 0 | 0 | 3 | 0 | 107 (13) | 11 |
| Lol Morgan | England | 1949–1954 | 7 | 0 | 0 | 0 | 0 | 0 | 0 | 0 | 0 | 0 | 7 | 0 |
| Charlie Morris | England | 1910–1911 | 16 | 0 | 4 | 0 | 0 | 0 | 0 | 0 | 0 | 0 | 20 | 0 |
| Lee Morris | England | 2001 | 5 | 1 | 0 | 0 | 0 | 0 | 0 | 0 | 0 | 0 | 5 | 1 |
| Seymour Morris | Wales | 1933–1935 | 6 | 3 | 0 | 0 | 0 | 0 | 0 | 0 | 0 | 0 | 6 | 3 |
| Andy Morrison | Scotland | 1996–1998 | 43 (2) | 2 | 2 | 0 | 8 | 0 | 0 | 0 | 0 | 0 | 53 (2) | 2 |
| Sean Morrison | England | 2012 | 19 | 1 | 0 | 0 | 0 | 0 | 0 | 0 | 3 | 0 | 22 | 1 |
| Arthur Morton | England | 1945–1948 | 0 | 0 | 2 | 0 | 0 | 0 | 0 | 0 | 0 | 0 | 2 | 0 |
| Adie Moses | England | 2000–2003 | 63 (6) | 1 | 2 | 1 | 1 | 0 | 4 | 0 | 1 | 0 | 71 (6) | 2 |
| Paul Moulden | England | 1995 | 0 (2) | 0 | 0 | 0 | 0 | 0 | 0 | 0 | 0 | 0 | 0 (2) | 0 |
| Steve Mounié | Benin | 2017–2020 | 52 (37) | 17 | 3 (2) | 2 | 0 (1) | 0 | 0 | 0 | 0 | 0 | 55 (40) | 19 |
| Bob Mountain | England | 1973–1975 | 1 | 0 | 0 | 0 | 0 | 0 | 0 | 0 | 0 | 0 | 1 | 0 |
| Bob Mountford | England | 1977–1978 | 12 (2) | 4 | 0 | 0 | 0 | 0 | 0 | 0 | 0 | 0 | 12 (2) | 4 |
| Reg Mountford | England | 1929–1946 | 236 | 7 | 19 | 0 | 0 | 0 | 0 | 0 | 0 | 0 | 255 | 7 |
| Joe Murphy | Republic of Ireland | 2014–2017 | 9 | 0 | 2 | 0 | 3 | 0 | 0 | 0 | 0 | 0 | 14 | 0 |
| Sandy Mutch | Scotland | 1910–1922 | 229 | 0 | 22 | 0 | 0 | 0 | 0 | 0 | 0 | 0 | 251 | 0 |
| Jimmy Naylor | England | 1928–1930 | 38 | 2 | 7 | 0 | 0 | 0 | 0 | 0 | 0 | 0 | 45 | 2 |
| Gary Naysmith | Scotland | 2010–2012 | 33 (3) | 0 | 1 | 0 | 4 | 0 | 1 | 0 | 3 | 0 | 42 (3) | 0 |
| Peter Ndlovu | Zimbabwe | 2000–2001 | 6 | 4 | 0 | 0 | 0 | 0 | 0 | 0 | 0 | 0 | 6 | 4 |
| Alf Newbold | England | 1945–1946 | 2 | 0 | 0 | 0 | 0 | 0 | 0 | 0 | 0 | 0 | 2 | 0 |
| Jon Newby | England | 2003–2004 | 10 (4) | 0 | 0 | 0 | 1 | 0 | 0 | 0 | 0 | 0 | 11 (4) | 0 |
| Bob Newton | England | 1973–1977 | 37 (5) | 7 | 3 | 2 | 3 (1) | 3 | 0 | 0 | 0 | 0 | 43 (6) | 12 |
| Michel Ngonge | Belgium | 2000 | 0 (4) | 0 | 0 | 0 | 0 | 0 | 0 | 0 | 0 | 0 | 0 (4) | 0 |
| Jimmy Nicholson | Northern Ireland | 1964–1973 | 280 (1) | 25 | 14 | 1 | 15 | 2 | 0 | 0 | 0 | 0 | 309 (1) | 28 |
| Martin Nielsen | Denmark | 1998 | 0 (3) | 0 | 0 | 0 | 0 | 0 | 0 | 0 | 0 | 0 | 0 (3) | 0 |
| Albert Nightingale | England | 1948–1951 | 119 | 20 | 8 | 1 | 0 | 0 | 0 | 0 | 0 | 0 | 127 | 21 |
| Tony Norman | Wales | 1995–1997 | 7 | 0 | 1 | 0 | 1 | 0 | 0 | 0 | 0 | 0 | 9 | 0 |
| Oliver Norwood | Northern Ireland | 2012–2014 | 75 (5) | 8 | 4 (2) | 1 | 4 | 0 | 0 | 0 | 0 | 0 | 83 (7) | 9 |
| Lee Novak | England | 2009–2013 | 88 (56) | 34 | 6 (2) | 5 | 4 (2) | 2 | 4 (3) | 1 | 5 (2) | 0 | 107 (65) | 42 |
| Micah Obiero | England | 2020–2022 | 0 (1) | 0 | 0 | 0 | 0 | 0 | 0 | 0 | 0 | 0 | 0 (1) | 0 |
| Lewis O'Brien | England | 2018–2022 | 118 (5) | 8 | 1 (2) | 0 | 1 (1) | 0 | 0 | 0 | 3 | 0 | 123 (8) | 8 |
| Brendan O'Connell | England | 1989–1990 | 11 | 1 | 0 | 0 | 0 | 0 | 0 | 0 | 0 | 0 | 11 | 1 |
| Derek O'Connor | Republic of Ireland | 1994–1998 | 1 | 0 | 0 | 0 | 0 (1) | 0 | 0 | 0 | 0 | 0 | 1 (1) | 0 |
| Ken O'Doherty | Republic of Ireland | 1988–1992 | 63 (2) | 1 | 6 | 0 | 6 | 1 | 5 | 0 | 0 | 0 | 80 (2) | 2 |
| Mipo Odubeko | Republic of Ireland | 2021–2022 | 0 (6) | 0 | 0 | 0 | 0 | 0 | 0 | 0 | 0 | 0 | 0 (6) | 0 |
| Duncan Ogilvie | Scotland | 1936 | 28 | 4 | 0 | 0 | 0 | 0 | 0 | 0 | 0 | 0 | 28 | 4 |
| Michael O'Grady | England | 1959–1965 | 160 | 26 | 8 | 1 | 6 | 1 | 0 | 0 | 0 | 0 | 174 | 28 |
| Mustapha Olagunju | England | 2020–2024 | 0 | 0 | 1 | 0 | 0 | 0 | 0 | 0 | 0 | 0 | 1 | 0 |
| John Oldfield | Republic of Ireland | 1961–1969 | 152 | 0 | 6 | 0 | 13 | 0 | 0 | 0 | 0 | 0 | 171 | 0 |
| Peter Oliver | Scotland | 1976–1977 | 41 | 1 | 2 | 0 | 4 | 0 | 0 | 0 | 0 | 0 | 47 | 1 |
| Brian O'Neil | England | 1974–1976 | 60 (1) | 3 | 3 | 0 | 3 | 0 | 0 | 0 | 0 | 0 | 66 (1) | 3 |
| Fola Onibuje | Nigeria | 2003–2004 | 0 (2) | 0 | 0 | 0 | 0 | 0 | 0 | 0 | 0 | 0 | 0 (2) | 0 |
| Iffy Onuora (1st spell) | Scotland | 1989–1994 | 115 (50) | 30 | 12 (3) | 3 | 10 (6) | 4 | 11 (3) | 2 | 2 | 1 | 150 (62) | 40 |
| Iffy Onuora (2nd spell) | Scotland | 2004 | 0 (3) | 0 | 0 | 0 | 0 | 0 | 0 | 0 | 2 | 1 | 2 (3) | 1 |
| Kieran O'Regan | Republic of Ireland | 1988–1993 | 187 (12) | 25 | 16 (1) | 3 | 15 (1) | 1 | 14 (1) | 3 | 2 | 0 | 234 (15) | 32 |
| Rob Page | Wales | 2008 | 18 | 1 | 2 | 0 | 0 | 0 | 0 | 0 | 0 | 0 | 20 | 1 |
| Kasey Palmer (1st spell) | Jamaica | 2016–2017 | 16 (8) | 4 | 1 | 1 | 0 (1) | 0 | 0 | 0 | 0 (1) | 0 | 17 (10) | 5 |
| Kasey Palmer (2nd spell) | Jamaica | 2017 | 1 (3) | 0 | 0 | 0 | 1 | 0 | 0 | 0 | 0 | 0 | 2 (3) | 0 |
| Bob Parker | England | 1954–1965 | 65 | 0 | 5 | 0 | 5 | 0 | 0 | 0 | 0 | 0 | 75 | 0 |
| Keigan Parker | Scotland | 2008–2009 | 14 (6) | 2 | 0 | 0 | 1 (1) | 0 | 1 | 0 | 0 | 0 | 16 (7) | 2 |
| Derek Parkin | England | 1963–1968 | 60 (1) | 1 | 2 | 0 | 7 | 0 | 0 | 0 | 0 | 0 | 69 (1) | 1 |
| Jon Parkin | England | 2011–2012 | 2 (1) | 0 | 0 | 0 | 0 | 0 | 0 | 0 | 0 | 0 | 2 (1) | 0 |
| Neil Parsley | England | 1990–1993 | 55 (2) | 0 | 6 | 0 | 6 | 1 | 6 | 0 | 0 | 0 | 73 (2) | 1 |
| Jamie Paterson | England | 2015–2016 | 22 (12) | 6 | 2 | 2 | 0 | 0 | 0 | 0 | 0 | 0 | 24 (12) | 8 |
| Martin Paterson | Northern Ireland | 2013–2015 | 13 (12) | 5 | 1 | 1 | 3 | 0 | 0 | 0 | 0 | 0 | 17 (12) | 6 |
| Ivan Paurević | Croatia | 2016–2017 | 0 (1) | 0 | 0 | 0 | 0 (1) | 0 | 0 | 0 | 0 | 0 | 0 (2) | 0 |
| Jack Payne | England | 2016–2019 | 10 (13) | 2 | 3 | 2 | 1 | 0 | 0 | 0 | 0 (1) | 0 | 14 (14) | 4 |
| Andy Payton | England | 1996–1998 | 42 (1) | 17 | 2 | 0 | 7 | 0 | 0 | 0 | 0 | 0 | 51 (1) | 17 |
| Krystian Pearce | Barbados | 2010 | 0 (1) | 0 | 0 | 0 | 0 | 0 | 0 | 0 | 0 | 0 | 0 (1) | 0 |
| Stan Pearson | England | 1921–1922 | 1 | 0 | 1 | 0 | 0 | 0 | 0 | 0 | 0 | 0 | 2 | 0 |
| Jack Percival | England | 1948–1950 | 8 | 0 | 0 | 0 | 0 | 0 | 0 | 0 | 0 | 0 | 8 | 0 |
| Joel Pereira | Portugal | 2020–2021 | 2 | 0 | 0 | 0 | 0 | 0 | 0 | 0 | 0 | 0 | 2 | 0 |
| Robert Perrett | England | 1936–1939 | 1 | 0 | 0 | 0 | 0 | 0 | 0 | 0 | 0 | 0 | 1 | 0 |
| Lee Peltier (1st spell) | England | 2009–2011 | 80 | 1 | 8 | 1 | 4 | 0 | 6 | 0 | 5 | 1 | 103 | 3 |
| Lee Peltier (2nd spell) | England | 2014–2015 | 8 (3) | 0 | 0 | 0 | 1 | 0 | 0 | 0 | 0 | 0 | 9 (3) | 0 |
| David Phillips | Wales | 1997–1999 | 44 (8) | 3 | 7 | 0 | 0 | 0 | 0 | 0 | 0 | 0 | 51 (8) | 3 |
| Bill Pickering | England | 1927–1929 | 1 | 0 | 1 | 0 | 0 | 0 | 0 | 0 | 0 | 0 | 2 | 0 |
| Gary Pierce | England | 1971–1973 | 23 | 0 | 0 | 0 | 1 | 0 | 0 | 0 | 0 | 0 | 24 | 0 |
| Anthony Pilkington | Republic of Ireland | 2009–2011 | 88 (2) | 19 | 6 | 1 | 3 | 0 | 6 | 5 | 2 | 0 | 105 (2) | 25 |
| Pipa | Spain | 2020–2022 | 41 (7) | 2 | 3 | 0 | 0 | 0 | 0 | 0 | 2 (1) | 0 | 46 (8) | 2 |
| Joe Poole | England | 1943–1947 | 2 | 0 | 1 | 0 | 0 | 0 | 0 | 0 | 0 | 0 | 3 | 0 |
| Terry Poole | England | 1968–1977 | 207 | 0 | 11 | 0 | 13 | 0 | 0 | 0 | 0 | 0 | 231 | 0 |
| Diego Poyet | England | 2014 | 2 | 0 | 0 | 0 | 0 | 0 | 0 | 0 | 0 | 0 | 2 | 0 |
| Billy Price | England | 1937–1947 | 51 | 23 | 9 | 8 | 0 | 0 | 0 | 0 | 0 | 0 | 60 | 31 |
| Alex Pritchard | England | 2018–2021 | 54 (26) | 3 | 0 (1) | 0 | 1 (1) | 0 | 0 | 0 | 0 | 0 | 55 (28) | 3 |
| James Proctor | England | 1911–1912 | 4 | 0 | 0 | 0 | 0 | 0 | 0 | 0 | 0 | 0 | 4 | 0 |
| Daral Pugh | England | 1982–1995 | 52 (33) | 7 | 3 (3) | 1 | 2 (1) | 0 | 0 | 0 | 0 | 0 | 57 (37) | 8 |
| Graham Pugh | England | 1972–1975 | 80 | 1 | 3 | 0 | 4 | 1 | 0 | 0 | 0 | 0 | 87 | 2 |
| Jason Puncheon | England | 2019 | 5 (1) | 0 | 1 | 0 | 0 | 0 | 0 | 0 | 0 | 0 | 6 (1) | 0 |
| Bernard Purdie | Wales | 1979–1982 | 37 (9) | 1 | 4 (2) | 0 | 4 | 0 | 0 | 0 | 0 | 0 | 45 (11) | 1 |
| Rekeil Pyke | England | 2016–2020 | 0 (1) | 0 | 0 | 0 | 0 | 0 | 0 | 0 | 0 | 0 | 0 (1) | 0 |
| Collin Quaner | Germany | 2017–2020 | 22 (27) | 2 | 7 | 1 | 1 | 0 | 0 | 0 | 0 (3) | 0 | 30 (30) | 3 |
| Len Quested | England | 1951–1957 | 220 | 8 | 16 | 1 | 0 | 0 | 0 | 0 | 0 | 0 | 236 | 9 |
| Johnny Quigley | Scotland | 1965–1966 | 66 (1) | 4 | 2 | 2 | 2 | 0 | 0 | 0 | 0 | 0 | 70 (1) | 6 |
| Phil Quinlan | England | 1991 | 7 (1) | 2 | 0 | 0 | 0 | 0 | 0 | 0 | 0 | 0 | 7 (1) | 2 |
| Danny Racchi | England | 2005–2008 | 0 (6) | 0 | 0 | 0 | 0 | 0 | 0 | 0 | 0 | 0 | 0 (6) | 0 |
| Paul Rachubka (1st spell) | England | 2004 | 13 | 0 | 0 | 0 | 0 | 0 | 0 | 0 | 3 | 0 | 16 | 0 |
| Paul Rachubka (2nd spell) | England | 2004–2007 | 63 | 0 | 3 | 0 | 2 | 0 | 1 (1) | 0 | 2 | 0 | 69 (1) | 0 |
| George Raitt | Scotland | 1911–1912 | 6 | 0 | 1 | 0 | 0 | 0 | 0 | 0 | 0 | 0 | 7 | 0 |
| Charles Randall | England | 1908–1910 | 16 | 0 | 3 | 1 | 0 | 0 | 0 | 0 | 0 | 0 | 19 | 1 |
| Andy Rankin | England | 1979–1982 | 71 | 0 | 4 | 0 | 6 | 0 | 0 | 0 | 0 | 0 | 81 | 0 |
| Harry Raw | England | 1925–1931 | 63 | 11 | 7 | 0 | 0 | 0 | 0 | 0 | 0 | 0 | 70 | 11 |
| Sid Rawlings | England | 1934–1935 | 11 | 2 | 0 | 0 | 0 | 0 | 0 | 0 | 0 | 0 | 11 | 2 |
| Paul Raynor | England | 1985–1987 | 38 (12) | 9 | 2 (1) | 0 | 3 | 0 | 1 | 0 | 0 | 0 | 44 (13) | 9 |
| Levi Redfern | England | 1927–1932 | 52 | 1 | 11 | 0 | 0 | 0 | 0 | 0 | 0 | 0 | 63 | 1 |
| Bob Reid | Scotland | 1914–1919 | 26 | 0 | 1 | 0 | 0 | 0 | 0 | 0 | 0 | 0 | 27 | 0 |
| Frank Reid | Scotland | 1946–1949 | 7 | 0 | 0 | 0 | 0 | 0 | 0 | 0 | 0 | 0 | 7 | 0 |
| Paul Reid | England | 1994–1997 | 70 (7) | 6 | 5 (1) | 0 | 9 | 1 | 1 | 0 | 0 | 0 | 85 (8) | 7 |
| Jazz Richards | Wales | 2013 | 7 (2) | 0 | 0 | 0 | 0 | 0 | 0 | 0 | 0 | 0 | 7 (2) | 0 |
| George Richardson | England | 1933–1934 | 1 | 0 | 0 | 0 | 0 | 0 | 0 | 0 | 0 | 0 | 1 | 0 |
| George E. H. Richardson | England | 1914–1923 | 110 | 7 | 21 | 2 | 0 | 0 | 0 | 0 | 0 | 0 | 131 | 9 |
| James Richardson | Scotland | 1910–1912 | 42 | 24 | 2 | 1 | 0 | 0 | 0 | 0 | 0 | 0 | 44 | 25 |
| Jimmy Richardson | England | 1934–1937 | 120 | 32 | 5 | 0 | 0 | 0 | 0 | 0 | 0 | 0 | 125 | 32 |
| Lee Richardson | England | 1997–2000 | 29 (7) | 3 | 0 (2) | 0 | 0 | 0 | 0 | 0 | 0 | 0 | 29 (9) | 3 |
| Ted Richardson | England | 1923–1924 | 6 | 0 | 0 | 0 | 0 | 0 | 0 | 0 | 0 | 0 | 6 | 0 |
| Liam Ridehalgh | England | 2009–2014 | 15 (5) | 0 | 3 | 0 | 0 | 0 | 3 | 0 | 0 | 0 | 21 (5) | 0 |
| Keith Ripley | England | 1978–1979 | 2 (3) | 0 | 0 | 0 | 0 (1) | 1 | 0 | 0 | 0 | 0 | 2 (4) | 1 |
| Gary Roberts | England | 2008–2012 | 145 (17) | 31 | 8 (1) | 5 | 6 (1) | 3 | 5 (3) | 0 | 5 (1) | 0 | 169 (23) | 39 |
| Iwan Roberts | Wales | 1990–1993 | 141 (1) | 50 | 12 | 4 | 13 (1) | 6 | 12 (1) | 8 | 2 | 0 | 180 (3) | 68 |
| Ian Robins | England | 1978–1982 | 145 (11) | 59 | 9 (2) | 5 | 9 | 3 | 0 | 0 | 0 | 0 | 163 (13) | 67 |
| Anton Robinson | England | 2011–2014 | 13 (14) | 1 | 1 | 0 | 1 | 0 | 2 | 0 | 0 (1) | 0 | 17 (15) | 1 |
| Fred Robinson | England | 1979–1982 | 72 | 2 | 6 | 0 | 6 | 0 | 0 | 0 | 0 | 0 | 84 | 2 |
| Jack Robinson | England | 2014–2015 | 30 | 0 | 1 | 0 | 0 | 0 | 0 | 0 | 0 | 0 | 31 | 0 |
| Liam Robinson | England | 1982–1986 | 17 (4) | 2 | 0 | 0 | 0 | 0 | 0 | 0 | 0 | 0 | 17 (4) | 2 |
| Phil Robinson | England | 1992–1994 | 74 (1) | 5 | 8 | 1 | 4 | 0 | 8 | 0 | 0 | 0 | 94 (1) | 6 |
| Reg Robinson | England | 1933–1935 | 2 | 0 | 1 | 0 | 0 | 0 | 0 | 0 | 0 | 0 | 3 | 0 |
| Ronnie Robinson | England | 1994 | 2 | 0 | 0 | 0 | 0 | 0 | 0 | 0 | 0 | 0 | 2 | 0 |
| Theo Robinson (1st spell) | Jamaica | 2009–2011 | 17 (21) | 13 | 0 (3) | 0 | 2 (1) | 3 | 0 | 0 | 0 (1) | 0 | 19 (26) | 16 |
| Theo Robinson (2nd spell) | Jamaica | 2013 | 4 (2) | 0 | 0 | 0 | 0 | 0 | 0 | 0 | 0 | 0 | 4 (2) | 0 |
| Joe Robson | England | 1930–1932 | 30 | 20 | 1 | 0 | 0 | 0 | 0 | 0 | 0 | 0 | 31 | 20 |
| Arnold Rodgers | England | 1943–1949 | 28 | 17 | 1 | 0 | 0 | 0 | 0 | 0 | 0 | 0 | 29 | 17 |
| Ralph Rodgerson | England | 1913–1921 | 26 | 0 | 1 | 0 | 0 | 0 | 0 | 0 | 0 | 0 | 27 | 0 |
| Larrett Roebuck | England | 1913–1914 | 17 | 0 | 2 | 0 | 0 | 0 | 0 | 0 | 0 | 0 | 19 | 0 |
| Leigh Richmond Roose | Wales | 1911 | 5 | 0 | 0 | 0 | 0 | 0 | 0 | 0 | 0 | 0 | 5 | 0 |
| George Roughton | England | 1928–1936 | 164 | 0 | 7 | 0 | 0 | 0 | 0 | 0 | 0 | 0 | 171 | 0 |
| Rodney Rowe | England | 1993–1997 | 14 (20) | 2 | 6 (1) | 2 | 0 (2) | 0 | 3 | 1 | 0 | 0 | 23 (23) | 5 |
| John Rudge | England | 1961–1966 | 5 | 0 | 0 | 0 | 0 | 0 | 0 | 0 | 0 | 0 | 5 | 0 |
| Colin Russell | England | 1982–1984 | 64 (2) | 23 | 4 (1) | 0 | 10 | 2 | 0 | 0 | 0 | 0 | 78 (3) | 25 |
| Jon Russell | Jamaica | 2021–2023 | 21 (3) | 2 | 2 | 0 | 1 | 0 | 0 | 0 | 2 (1) | 0 | 26 (4) | 2 |
| Robbie Ryan | Republic of Ireland | 1994–1998 | 12 (3) | 0 | 0 | 0 | 2 | 0 | 0 | 0 | 0 | 0 | 14 (3) | 0 |
| Abdelhamid Sabiri | Germany | 2017–2019 | 3 (4) | 0 | 3 (1) | 0 | 1 (1) | 0 | 0 | 0 | 0 | 0 | 7 (6) | 0 |
| Phil Sandercock | England | 1977–1979 | 81 | 1 | 2 | 0 | 6 | 0 | 0 | 0 | 0 | 0 | 89 | 1 |
| Yaya Sanogo | France | 2021 | 5 (4) | 0 | 0 | 0 | 0 | 0 | 0 | 0 | 0 | 0 | 5 (4) | 0 |
| Naby Sarr | Senegal | 2020–2022 | 55 (4) | 7 | 3 | 0 | 1 | 0 | 0 | 0 | 2 (1) | 0 | 61 (5) | 7 |
| John Saunders | England | 1972–1976 | 121 | 1 | 4 | 1 | 8 | 1 | 0 | 0 | 0 | 0 | 133 | 3 |
| Pat Saward | Republic of Ireland | 1961–1963 | 59 | 1 | 1 | 0 | 3 | 0 | 0 | 0 | 0 | 0 | 63 | 1 |
| Sean Scannell | Republic of Ireland | 2012–2018 | 95 (63) | 8 | 4 (5) | 1 | 3 (2) | 0 | 0 | 0 | 0 | 0 | 102 (70) | 9 |
| Christopher Schindler | Germany | 2016–2021 | 172 (3) | 5 | 2 | 0 | 4 | 0 | 0 | 0 | 3 | 0 | 181 (3) | 5 |
| Danny Schofield | England | 1999–2008 | 205 (43) | 39 | 13 (2) | 1 | 8 (1) | 0 | 11 (1) | 5 | 5 | 1 | 242 (47) | 46 |
| Paul Scott | England | 2002–2004 | 18 (14) | 2 | 1 | 0 | 1 (1) | 0 | 1 | 0 | 0 (1) | 0 | 21 (16) | 2 |
| Pat Scully | Republic of Ireland | 1994–1996 | 74 | 2 | 2 | 0 | 4 | 1 | 5 | 0 | 3 | 0 | 88 | 3 |
| Scott Sellars | England | 1999–2002 | 29 (19) | 1 | 1 (1) | 0 | 1 (2) | 1 | 0 | 0 | 0 | 0 | 31 (22) | 2 |
| Colin Senior | England | 1945–1951 | 5 | 1 | 1 | 0 | 0 | 0 | 0 | 0 | 0 | 0 | 6 | 1 |
| Michael Senior | England | 1999–2002 | 0 (4) | 0 | 0 | 0 | 0 | 0 | 0 | 0 | 0 | 0 | 0 (4) | 0 |
| Phil Senior | England | 1996–2006 | 49 (4) | 0 | 1 (1) | 0 | 0 | 0 | 2 | 0 | 0 | 0 | 52 (5) | 0 |
| Kevin Sharp | Canada | 2002–2003 | 38 (1) | 0 | 1 | 0 | 2 | 0 | 1 | 0 | 0 | 0 | 42 (1) | 0 |
| David Shaw | England | 1967–1969 | 23 (3) | 2 | 0 | 0 | 1 | 1 | 0 | 0 | 0 | 0 | 24 (3) | 3 |
| George Shaw | England | 1924–1926 | 29 | 0 | 0 | 0 | 0 | 0 | 0 | 0 | 0 | 0 | 29 | 0 |
| Duncan Shearer | Scotland | 1986–1988 | 80 (3) | 38 | 5 | 3 | 6 | 6 | 2 | 1 | 0 | 0 | 93 (3) | 48 |
| John Shiel | England | 1938–1939 | 1 | 0 | 0 | 0 | 0 | 0 | 0 | 0 | 0 | 0 | 1 | 0 |
| Ralph Shields | England | 1914–1920 | 45 | 21 | 0 | 0 | 0 | 0 | 0 | 0 | 0 | 0 | 45 | 21 |
| Roy Shiner | England | 1951–1955 | 21 | 6 | 2 | 1 | 0 | 0 | 0 | 0 | 0 | 0 | 23 | 7 |
| Chris Short | England | 1994–1995 | 6 | 0 | 0 | 0 | 0 | 0 | 1 | 0 | 0 | 0 | 7 | 0 |
| Malcolm Shotton | England | 1988 | 16 | 1 | 0 | 0 | 2 | 0 | 0 | 0 | 0 | 0 | 18 | 1 |
| Arnie Sidebottom | England | 1976–1978 | 56 (5) | 5 | 3 | 1 | 0 (2) | 0 | 0 | 0 | 0 | 0 | 59 (7) | 6 |
| Chris Simpkin | England | 1975–1976 | 25 | 0 | 4 | 0 | 0 | 0 | 0 | 0 | 0 | 0 | 29 | 0 |
| Danny Simpson | England | 2019–2020 | 23 (1) | 0 | 1 | 0 | 0 | 0 | 0 | 0 | 0 | 0 | 24 (1) | 0 |
| John Simpson | England | 1939–1948 | 5 | 0 | 2 | 0 | 0 | 0 | 0 | 0 | 0 | 0 | 7 | 0 |
| Robbie Simpson | England | 2009–2012 | 4 (10) | 0 | 0 | 0 | 0 (2) | 0 | 1 | 1 | 0 | 0 | 5 (12) | 1 |
| Ron Simpson | England | 1951–1958 | 110 | 24 | 8 | 2 | 0 | 0 | 0 | 0 | 0 | 0 | 118 | 26 |
| Danel Sinani | Luxembourg | 2021–2022 | 31 (8) | 6 | 2 (1) | 0 | 1 (1) | 0 | 0 | 0 | 3 | 1 | 37 (10) | 7 |
| Frank Sinclair (1st spell) | Jamaica | 2007 | 13 | 0 | 0 | 0 | 0 | 0 | 0 | 0 | 0 | 0 | 13 | 0 |
| Frank Sinclair (2nd spell) | Jamaica | 2007–2008 | 28 (1) | 0 | 5 | 0 | 1 | 0 | 0 | 0 | 0 | 0 | 34 (1) | 0 |
| Willie Sinclair | Scotland | 1958–1960 | 15 | 5 | 0 | 0 | 0 | 0 | 0 | 0 | 0 | 0 | 15 | 5 |
| Jordan Sinnott | England | 2013–2015 | 0 (2) | 0 | 2 (1) | 0 | 0 | 0 | 0 | 0 | 0 | 0 | 2 (3) | 0 |
| Lee Sinnott | England | 1994–1997 | 86 (1) | 1 | 4 | 0 | 6 | 0 | 0 | 0 | 3 | 0 | 99 (1) | 1 |
| Joe Skarz | England | 2006–2010 | 60 (8) | 1 | 5 (1) | 0 | 3 | 0 | 3 (1) | 0 | 0 | 0 | 71 (10) | 1 |
| George Skelton | England | 1945–1947 | 1 | 0 | 0 | 0 | 0 | 0 | 0 | 0 | 0 | 0 | 1 | 0 |
| Charlie Slade | England | 1914–1922 | 111 | 6 | 18 | 1 | 0 | 0 | 0 | 0 | 0 | 0 | 129 | 7 |
| Jacky Slicer | England | 1925–1927 | 7 | 2 | 0 | 0 | 0 | 0 | 0 | 0 | 0 | 0 | 7 | 2 |
| Jimmy Smailes | England | 1928–1931 | 32 | 8 | 3 | 0 | 0 | 0 | 0 | 0 | 0 | 0 | 35 | 8 |
| Albert Smith | England | 1922–1926 | 12 | 1 | 0 | 0 | 0 | 0 | 0 | 0 | 0 | 0 | 12 | 1 |
| Alex P. Smith | England | 1997–1998 | 4 (2) | 0 | 0 | 0 | 0 | 0 | 0 | 0 | 0 | 0 | 4 (2) | 0 |
| Alex Smith | England | 1968–1970 | 29 | 0 | 2 | 0 | 2 | 0 | 0 | 0 | 0 | 0 | 33 | 0 |
| Bert Smith | England | 1913–1919 | 16 | 5 | 0 | 0 | 0 | 0 | 0 | 0 | 0 | 0 | 16 | 5 |
| Billy E. Smith | England | 1919–1922 | 3 | 0 | 0 | 0 | 0 | 0 | 0 | 0 | 0 | 0 | 3 | 0 |
| Billy H. Smith | England | 1913–1934 | 521 | 114 | 53 | 12 | 0 | 0 | 0 | 0 | 0 | 0 | 574 | 126 |
| Conway Smith | England | 1945–1951 | 37 | 5 | 3 | 0 | 0 | 0 | 0 | 0 | 0 | 0 | 40 | 5 |
| Dan Smith | England | 2006 | 7 (1) | 0 | 0 | 0 | 0 | 0 | 0 | 0 | 0 | 0 | 7 (1) | 0 |
| Dave Smith | England | 1967–1974 | 27 (7) | 7 | 4 | 1 | 2 | 0 | 0 | 0 | 0 | 0 | 33 (7) | 8 |
| Jack Smith | England | 1932–1934 | 45 | 24 | 1 | 0 | 0 | 0 | 0 | 0 | 0 | 0 | 46 | 24 |
| Les Smith | England | 1946–1949 | 37 | 0 | 1 | 0 | 0 | 0 | 0 | 0 | 0 | 0 | 38 | 1 |
| Mark Craig Smith | England | 1993 | 5 | 0 | 0 | 0 | 0 | 0 | 0 | 0 | 0 | 0 | 5 | 0 |
| Mark Cyril Smith | England | 1989–1991 | 85 (11) | 11 | 5 (1) | 1 | 5 | 0 | 5 | 0 | 0 | 0 | 100 (12) | 13 |
| Martin Smith | England | 2000–2003 | 72 (8) | 29 | 1 | 0 | 2 (1) | 0 | 1 | 0 | 0 | 0 | 76 (9) | 29 |
| Norman Smith | England | 1923–1927 | 24 | 0 | 0 | 0 | 0 | 0 | 0 | 0 | 0 | 0 | 24 | 0 |
| Paul Smith | England | 1972–1974 | 1 (1) | 0 | 0 (1) | 0 | 0 | 0 | 0 | 0 | 0 | 0 | 1 (2) | 0 |
| Steve Smith (1st spell) | England | 1963–1977 | 330 (12) | 31 | 21 | 3 | 16 (1) | 0 | 0 | 0 | 0 | 0 | 367 (13) | 34 |
| Steve Smith (2nd spell) | England | 1981 | 0 | 0 | 1 | 0 | 0 | 0 | 0 | 0 | 0 | 0 | 1 | 0 |
| Tommy E. Smith | England | 1979–1981 | 0 (1) | 0 | 0 | 0 | 1 | 0 | 0 | 0 | 0 | 0 | 1 (1) | 0 |
| Tommy G. Smith | England | 2012–2019 | 170 (12) | 4 | 7 (3) | 1 | 5 | 0 | 0 | 0 | 3 | 0 | 185 (15) | 5 |
| Emile Smith Rowe | England | 2020 | 13 (6) | 2 | 0 | 0 | 0 | 0 | 0 | 0 | 0 | 0 | 13 (6) | 2 |
| Alex Smithies | England | 2007–2015 | 246 (1) | 0 | 11 | 0 | 8 | 0 | 4 | 0 | 3 (1) | 0 | 272 (2) | 0 |
| Ramadan Sobhi | Egypt | 2018–2020 | 0 (4) | 0 | 0 | 0 | 0 | 0 | 0 | 0 | 0 | 0 | 0 (4) | 0 |
| Akpo Sodje | Nigeria | 2003–2005 | 1 (6) | 0 | 0 | 0 | 0 | 0 | 1 (1) | 0 | 0 | 0 | 2 (7) | 0 |
| Efe Sodje | Nigeria | 2003–2005 | 61 (6) | 5 | 1 | 0 | 3 | 0 | 1 (1) | 0 | 3 | 0 | 69 (7) | 5 |
| Keith Southern | England | 2012–2014 | 32 (7) | 2 | 0 | 0 | 2 | 0 | 0 | 0 | 0 | 0 | 34 (7) | 2 |
| Jim Spedding | England | 1936–1937 | 4 | 0 | 0 | 0 | 0 | 0 | 0 | 0 | 0 | 0 | 4 | 0 |
| Bon Spence | England | 1923–1933 | 69 | 0 | 13 | 0 | 0 | 0 | 0 | 0 | 0 | 0 | 82 | 0 |
| Jimmy Spencer | England | 2010–2014 | 0 (1) | 0 | 0 | 0 | 1 | 0 | 0 | 0 | 0 | 0 | 1 (1) | 0 |
| Steve Spriggs | England | 1973–1975 | 2 (2) | 0 | 0 | 0 | 1 | 0 | 0 | 0 | 0 | 0 | 3 (2) | 0 |
| Ron Staniforth | England | 1952–1955 | 110 | 0 | 8 | 0 | 0 | 0 | 0 | 0 | 0 | 0 | 118 | 0 |
| Jon Gorenc Stanković | Slovenia | 2016–2020 | 26 (11) | 2 | 6 | 0 | 3 | 0 | 0 | 0 | 0 | 0 | 35 (11) | 2 |
| Phil Stant | England | 1991 | 5 | 1 | 0 | 0 | 0 | 0 | 0 | 0 | 0 | 0 | 5 | 1 |
| Brian Stanton | England | 1979–1986 | 199 (10) | 45 | 17 | 6 | 14 (1) | 3 | 0 | 0 | 0 | 0 | 230 (11) | 54 |
| Frank Stapleton | Republic of Ireland | 1991 | 5 | 0 | 1 (1) | 1 | 0 (1) | 0 | 1 | 0 | 0 | 0 | 7 (2) | 1 |
| Phil Starbuck | England | 1991–1994 | 120 (17) | 36 | 5 (1) | 0 | 13 (2) | 4 | 14 (3) | 6 | 2 | 1 | 154 (23) | 47 |
| Alan Starling | England | 1977–1980 | 112 | 0 | 4 | 0 | 10 | 0 | 0 | 0 | 0 | 0 | 126 | 0 |
| Jon Stead (1st spell) | England | 2002–2004 | 54 (14) | 22 | 2 | 0 | 5 | 2 | 2 | 0 | 0 | 0 | 63 (14) | 24 |
| Jon Stead (2nd spell) | England | 2013–2015 | 8 (11) | 2 | 0 | 0 | 2 (2) | 0 | 0 | 0 | 0 | 0 | 10 (13) | 3 |
| Richard Stearman | England | 2020–2021 | 31 (7) | 0 | 0 | 0 | 0 | 0 | 0 | 0 | 0 | 0 | 31 (7) | 0 |
| David Steele | Scotland | 1922–1929 | 186 | 1 | 17 | 2 | 0 | 0 | 0 | 0 | 0 | 0 | 203 | 3 |
| Jed Steer (1st spell) | England | 2015 | 10 | 0 | 0 | 0 | 0 | 0 | 0 | 0 | 0 | 0 | 10 | 0 |
| Jed Steer (2nd spell) | England | 2015 | 6 | 0 | 0 | 0 | 0 | 0 | 0 | 0 | 0 | 0 | 6 | 0 |
| Jed Steer (3rd spell) | England | 2016 | 22 | 0 | 0 | 0 | 0 | 0 | 0 | 0 | 0 | 0 | 22 | 0 |
| Clem Stephenson | England | 1921–1929 | 248 | 42 | 27 | 8 | 0 | 0 | 0 | 0 | 0 | 0 | 275 | 50 |
| Alan Stewart | England | 1941–1949 | 14 | 0 | 1 | 0 | 0 | 0 | 0 | 0 | 0 | 0 | 15 | 0 |
| Henry Stewart | England | 1948–1951 | 49 | 0 | 0 | 0 | 0 | 0 | 0 | 0 | 0 | 0 | 49 | 0 |
| Marcus Stewart | England | 1996–2000 | 129 (4) | 58 | 9 | 3 | 18 | 7 | 0 | 0 | 0 | 0 | 156 (4) | 68 |
| Derek Stokes | England | 1960–1966 | 153 | 65 | 10 | 2 | 7 | 2 | 0 | 0 | 0 | 0 | 170 | 69 |
| Kevin Stonehouse | England | 1983–1984 | 20 (2) | 4 | 2 | 2 | 3 (1) | 0 | 0 | 0 | 0 | 0 | 25 (3) | 6 |
| Steve Stoutt | England | 1980–1985 | 6 | 0 | 4 | 0 | 0 | 0 | 0 | 0 | 0 | 0 | 10 | 0 |
| Mark Stuart | England | 1992–1993 | 9 (6) | 3 | 2 | 0 | 0 | 0 | 4 | 1 | 0 | 0 | 15 (6) | 4 |
| Phil Summerill | England | 1973–1974 | 48 (6) | 11 | 1 | 0 | 3 | 1 | 0 | 0 | 0 | 0 | 52 (6) | 12 |
| Dave Sutton | England | 1978–1985 | 242 | 11 | 19 | 0 | 23 | 4 | 0 | 0 | 0 | 0 | 284 | 15 |
| Jack Swann | England | 1919–1921 | 67 | 33 | 7 | 3 | 0 | 0 | 0 | 0 | 0 | 0 | 74 | 36 |
| Alan Sweeney | Scotland | 1972–1978 | 65 (1) | 5 | 0 | 0 | 0 | 0 | 0 | 0 | 0 | 0 | 70 (1) | 0 |
| John Tanner | England | 1946–1948 | 1 | 1 | 0 | 0 | 0 | 0 | 0 | 0 | 0 | 0 | 1 | 1 |
| Andy Taylor | England | 2007 | 7 (1) | 0 | 0 | 0 | 0 | 0 | 0 | 0 | 0 | 0 | 7 (1) | 0 |
| Archie Taylor | Scotland | 1911–1912 | 29 | 0 | 5 | 0 | 0 | 0 | 0 | 0 | 0 | 0 | 34 | 0 |
| Dick Taylor | England | 1973–1982 | 105 | 0 | 11 | 0 | 3 | 0 | 0 | 0 | 0 | 0 | 119 | 0 |
| Harry Taylor | England | 1910–1912 | 15 | 5 | 1 | 0 | 0 | 0 | 0 | 0 | 0 | 0 | 16 | 5 |
| Jeff Taylor | England | 1949–1951 | 68 | 27 | 3 | 2 | 0 | 0 | 0 | 0 | 0 | 0 | 71 | 29 |
| Ken Taylor | England | 1952–1965 | 250 | 14 | 18 | 0 | 1 | 0 | 0 | 0 | 0 | 0 | 269 | 14 |
| Ray Taylor | England | 1949–1953 | 2 | 0 | 0 | 0 | 0 | 0 | 0 | 0 | 0 | 0 | 2 | 0 |
| Sammy Taylor | England | 1913–1921 | 61 | 39 | 6 | 6 | 0 | 0 | 0 | 0 | 0 | 0 | 67 | 45 |
| Ted Taylor | England | 1922–1927 | 119 | 0 | 10 | 0 | 0 | 0 | 0 | 0 | 0 | 0 | 129 | 0 |
| Gary Taylor-Fletcher | England | 2005–2007 | 69 (13) | 21 | 4 | 1 | 3 | 3 | 1 | 0 | 2 | 1 | 79 (13) | 26 |
| Dale Tempest | England | 1984–1986 | 63 (2) | 27 | 4 | 1 | 3 | 1 | 0 | 0 | 0 | 0 | 70 (2) | 29 |
| Andy Thackeray | England | 1986–1987 | 2 | 0 | 0 | 0 | 0 | 0 | 0 (1) | 0 | 0 | 0 | 2 (1) | 0 |
| Arthur Thompson | England | 1943–1949 | 25 | 5 | 0 | 0 | 0 | 0 | 0 | 0 | 0 | 0 | 25 | 5 |
| Tyrone Thompson | England | 2003–2004 | 1 (1) | 0 | 0 | 0 | 0 | 0 | 0 | 0 | 0 | 0 | 1 (1) | 0 |
| Robert Thomson | Scotland | 1911–1912 | 5 | 0 | 0 | 0 | 0 | 0 | 0 | 0 | 0 | 0 | 5 | 0 |
| Ben Thornley (1st spell) | England | 1996 | 12 | 2 | 0 | 0 | 0 | 0 | 0 | 0 | 0 | 0 | 12 | 2 |
| Ben Thornley (2nd spell) | England | 1998–2001 | 77 (22) | 5 | 5 | 0 | 10 | 1 | 0 | 0 | 0 | 0 | 92 (22) | 6 |
| George Thorpe | England | 1932–1933 | 8 | 0 | 0 | 0 | 0 | 0 | 0 | 0 | 0 | 0 | 8 | 0 |
| John Thorrington | United States | 2001–2004 | 48 (19) | 7 | 0 (1) | 0 | 1 (2) | 1 | 2 | 0 | 2 | 0 | 53 (22) | 8 |
| Brian Tickell | England | 1956–1959 | 1 | 0 | 0 | 0 | 0 | 0 | 0 | 0 | 0 | 0 | 1 | 0 |
| Paul Tisdale | Malta | 1996–1997 | 1 (1) | 0 | 0 | 0 | 0 | 0 | 0 | 0 | 0 | 0 | 1 (1) | 0 |
| Harry Toffolo | England | 2020–2022 | 90 (2) | 9 | 0 (1) | 0 | 3 | 0 | 0 | 0 | 3 | 0 | 96 (3) | 9 |
| Maurice Tompkin | England | 1946–1947 | 10 | 1 | 0 | 0 | 0 | 0 | 0 | 0 | 0 | 0 | 10 | 1 |
| Percy Tompkin | England | 1919–1920 | 1 | 0 | 0 | 0 | 0 | 0 | 0 | 0 | 0 | 0 | 1 | 0 |
| Chris Topping | England | 1978–1981 | 43 | 1 | 4 | 0 | 2 | 0 | 0 | 0 | 0 | 0 | 49 | 1 |
| Simon Trevitt | England | 1986–1995 | 216 (13) | 3 | 13 | 0 | 23 | 1 | 15 (1) | 0 | 5 | 0 | 272 (14) | 4 |
| Neal Trotman | England | 2010 | 21 | 2 | 0 | 0 | 0 | 0 | 0 | 0 | 2 | 0 | 23 | 2 |
| Gordon Tucker | England | 1987–1989 | 30 (5) | 0 | 0 (2) | 0 | 3 (1) | 0 | 1 (1) | 0 | 0 | 0 | 34 (9) | 0 |
| Andy Turner | England | 1995 | 2 (3) | 1 | 0 | 0 | 0 | 0 | 0 | 0 | 0 | 0 | 2 (3) | 1 |
| Hugh Turner | England | 1926–1937 | 364 | 0 | 30 | 0 | 0 | 0 | 0 | 0 | 0 | 0 | 394 | 0 |
| John Turner | England | 1975 | 1 | 0 | 0 | 0 | 0 | 0 | 0 | 0 | 0 | 0 | 1 | 0 |
| Ken Turner | England | 1958–1963 | 5 | 0 | 0 | 0 | 1 | 0 | 0 | 0 | 0 | 0 | 6 | 0 |
| Robbie Turner | England | 1983–1985 | 0 (2) | 0 | 0 | 0 | 1 | 0 | 0 | 0 | 0 | 0 | 1 (2) | 0 |
| David Unsworth | England | 2008–2009 | 4 | 0 | 0 | 0 | 0 | 0 | 1 | 0 | 0 | 0 | 5 | 0 |
| Tomáš Vaclík | Czech Republic | 2023 | 13 | 0 | 0 | 0 | 0 | 0 | 0 | 0 | 0 | 0 | 13 | 0 |
| Nico Vaesen | Belgium | 1998–2001 | 134 | 0 | 7 | 0 | 12 | 0 | 0 | 0 | 0 | 0 | 153 | 0 |
| Peter Valentine | England | 1979–1983 | 19 | 1 | 1 | 0 | 2 | 0 | 0 | 0 | 0 | 0 | 22 | 1 |
| Álex Vallejo | Spain | 2020–2022 | 14 (7) | 1 | 1 | 0 | 1 | 0 | 0 | 0 | 0 | 0 | 16 (7) | 1 |
| Rajiv van La Parra | Netherlands | 2016–2020 | 77 (13) | 5 | 3 (3) | 2 | 2 (1) | 0 | 0 | 0 | 3 | 0 | 85 (17) | 7 |
| James Vaughan (1st spell) | England | 2012–2013 | 31 (2) | 14 | 2 (2) | 0 | 0 | 0 | 0 | 0 | 0 | 0 | 33 (4) | 14 |
| James Vaughan (2nd spell) | England | 2013–2016 | 41 (12) | 16 | 2 | 0 | 2 (1) | 2 | 0 | 0 | 0 | 0 | 45 (13) | 19 |
| Willis Vaughton | England | 1929–1934 | 2 | 1 | 0 | 0 | 0 | 0 | 0 | 0 | 0 | 0 | 2 | 1 |
| Ray Veall | England | 1965–1968 | 12 | 1 | 1 | 0 | 0 | 0 | 0 | 0 | 0 | 0 | 13 | 1 |
| Jamie Vincent | England | 1999–2001 | 54 (5) | 2 | 2 | 0 | 3 (2) | 0 | 0 | 0 | 0 | 0 | 59 (7) | 2 |
| Tom Wade | England | 1929–1930 | 1 | 0 | 0 | 0 | 0 | 0 | 0 | 0 | 0 | 0 | 1 | 0 |
| Ian Wadsworth | England | 1983–1986 | 0 (1) | 0 | 0 | 0 | 0 | 0 | 0 | 0 | 0 | 0 | 0 (1) | 0 |
| Sam Wadsworth | England | 1921–1929 | 281 | 4 | 31 | 0 | 0 | 0 | 0 | 0 | 0 | 0 | 312 | 4 |
| Steve Walford | England | 1987 | 12 | 0 | 0 | 0 | 0 | 0 | 1 | 0 | 0 | 0 | 13 | 0 |
| Fred Walker | England | 1908–1910 | 24 | 0 | 2 | 1 | 0 | 0 | 0 | 0 | 0 | 0 | 26 | 1 |
| Paul Walker | England | 1976–1977 | 1 | 0 | 0 | 0 | 0 | 0 | 0 | 0 | 0 | 0 | 1 | 0 |
| Bob Wallace | England | 1963–1967 | 4 | 0 | 0 | 0 | 0 | 0 | 0 | 0 | 0 | 0 | 4 | 0 |
| Murray Wallace | Scotland | 2012–2016 | 34 (17) | 3 | 4 | 0 | 4 (1) | 1 | 0 | 0 | 0 | 0 | 42 (18) | 4 |
| Ronnie Wallwork | England | 2007 | 16 | 3 | 2 | 0 | 0 | 0 | 0 | 0 | 0 | 0 | 18 | 3 |
| Alan Walsh | England | 1991–1992 | 0 (4) | 0 | 0 (1) | 0 | 0 | 0 | 0 | 0 | 0 | 0 | 0 (5) | 0 |
| Joe Walter | England | 1922–1925 | 55 | 5 | 2 | 0 | 0 | 0 | 0 | 0 | 0 | 0 | 57 | 5 |
| Danny Ward | Wales | 2016–2017 | 43 | 0 | 0 | 0 | 1 | 0 | 0 | 0 | 2 | 0 | 46 | 0 |
| Elliott Ward | England | 2015 | 5 | 0 | 0 | 0 | 0 | 0 | 0 | 0 | 0 | 0 | 5 | 0 |
| Mark Ward | England | 1996 | 7 (1) | 0 | 0 | 0 | 0 | 0 | 0 | 0 | 0 | 0 | 7 (1) | 0 |
| Peter Ward | England | 1986–1989 | 24 (13) | 2 | 2 | 0 | 1 (1) | 0 | 1 | 0 | 0 | 0 | 28 (14) | 2 |
| Richard Ward | England | 1993–1994 | 0 | 0 | 0 | 0 | 1 | 0 | 0 | 0 | 0 | 0 | 1 | 0 |
| Albert Watson | England | 1936–1948 | 17 | 0 | 1 | 0 | 0 | 0 | 0 | 0 | 0 | 0 | 18 | 0 |
| Billy Watson | England | 1912–1928 | 292 | 0 | 30 | 1 | 0 | 0 | 0 | 0 | 0 | 0 | 322 | 1 |
| Edwin Watson | Scotland | 1938–1939 | 3 | 0 | 3 | 1 | 0 | 0 | 0 | 0 | 0 | 0 | 6 | 1 |
| Jimmy Watson | Scotland | 1952–1957 | 140 | 29 | 8 | 3 | 0 | 0 | 0 | 0 | 0 | 0 | 148 | 32 |
| Willie Watson | England | 1937–1946 | 11 | 0 | 0 | 0 | 0 | 0 | 0 | 0 | 0 | 0 | 11 | 0 |
| Julian Watts | England | 1998 | 8 | 0 | 0 | 0 | 0 | 0 | 0 | 0 | 0 | 0 | 8 | 0 |
| Simon Webster | England | 1985–1988 | 118 | 4 | 7 | 0 | 7 | 0 | 2 | 0 | 0 | 0 | 134 | 4 |
| Mark Wells | England | 1993–1994 | 21 (1) | 4 | 3 | 0 | 4 | 0 | 2 (1) | 0 | 0 | 0 | 30 (2) | 4 |
| Nahki Wells | Bermuda | 2014–2017 | 120 (24) | 45 | 3 (1) | 1 | 2 | 3 | 0 | 0 | 3 | 0 | 128 (25) | 49 |
| Dominik Werling | Germany | 2009 | 0 (3) | 0 | 0 | 0 | 0 | 0 | 0 | 0 | 0 | 0 | 0 (3) | 0 |
| Don Weston | England | 1965–1966 | 20 (2) | 7 | 1 | 0 | 0 | 0 | 0 | 0 | 0 | 0 | 21 (2) | 7 |
| Jack Wheeler | England | 1948–1956 | 166 | 0 | 16 | 0 | 0 | 0 | 0 | 0 | 0 | 0 | 182 | 0 |
| Ike Whelpton | England | 1911–1912 | 2 | 0 | 0 | 0 | 0 | 0 | 0 | 0 | 0 | 0 | 2 | 0 |
| Len White | England | 1962–1965 | 102 | 37 | 4 | 1 | 4 | 1 | 0 | 0 | 0 | 0 | 110 | 39 |
| Dean Whitehead | England | 2015–2018 | 41 (13) | 0 | 4 (2) | 0 | 2 (1) | 0 | 0 | 0 | 0 | 0 | 47 (16) | 0 |
| Craig Whitington | England | 1994–1996 | 1 | 0 | 0 | 0 | 0 | 0 | 0 | 0 | 0 | 0 | 1 | 0 |
| Jon Whitney | England | 1993–1996 | 17 (1) | 0 | 0 | 0 | 0 (1) | 0 | 4 | 0 | 0 | 0 | 21 (2) | 0 |
| Bill Whittaker | England | 1948–1950 | 43 | 0 | 4 | 0 | 0 | 0 | 0 | 0 | 0 | 0 | 47 | 0 |
| Ernie Whittam | England | 1928–1933 | 19 | 4 | 1 | 0 | 0 | 0 | 0 | 0 | 0 | 0 | 20 | 4 |
| Alf Whittingham | England | 1947–1949 | 67 | 17 | 1 | 0 | 0 | 0 | 0 | 0 | 0 | 0 | 68 | 17 |
| Sam Whittingham | England | 1910–1911 | 0 | 0 | 1 | 0 | 0 | 0 | 0 | 0 | 0 | 0 | 1 | 0 |
| Ted Widdowfield | England | 1935–1936 | 5 | 0 | 0 | 0 | 0 | 0 | 0 | 0 | 0 | 0 | 5 | 0 |
| George Wienand | South Africa | 1937–1938 | 28 | 3 | 4 | 0 | 0 | 0 | 0 | 0 | 0 | 0 | 32 | 3 |
| Jock Wightman | Scotland | 1935–1937 | 64 | 0 | 3 | 0 | 0 | 0 | 0 | 0 | 0 | 0 | 67 | 0 |
| Joseph Wigmore | England | 1912–1913 | 1 | 0 | 0 | 0 | 0 | 0 | 0 | 0 | 0 | 0 | 1 | 0 |
| Clyde Wijnhard | Suriname | 1999–2002 | 51 (11) | 16 | 1 | 0 | 7 | 1 | 1 (1) | 1 | 0 | 0 | 60 (12) | 18 |
| Tom Wilcox | England | 1911 | 2 | 0 | 0 | 0 | 0 | 0 | 0 | 0 | 0 | 0 | 2 | 0 |
| Joe Wilkinson | England | 2015–2016 | 1 | 0 | 0 | 0 | 0 | 0 | 0 | 0 | 0 | 0 | 1 | 0 |
| Andy Williams | England | 1993 | 4 (2) | 0 | 0 | 0 | 0 | 0 | 0 | 0 | 0 | 0 | 4 (2) | 0 |
| Danny Williams | United States | 2017–2019 | 12 (13) | 0 | 3 | 1 | 2 | 0 | 0 | 0 | 0 | 0 | 17 (13) | 1 |
| Jackie Williams | Wales | 1932–1935 | 50 | 15 | 2 | 0 | 0 | 0 | 0 | 0 | 0 | 0 | 52 | 15 |
| Joey Williams | England | 1924–1926 | 58 | 6 | 2 | 0 | 0 | 0 | 0 | 0 | 0 | 0 | 60 | 6 |
| Jordan Williams | England | 2017–2018 | 0 | 0 | 0 | 0 | 1 | 0 | 0 | 0 | 0 | 0 | 1 | 0 |
| Mike Williams | England | 1996 | 2 | 0 | 0 | 0 | 0 | 0 | 0 | 0 | 0 | 0 | 2 | 0 |
| Paul Williams (1st spell) | England | 1994 | 2 | 0 | 0 | 0 | 0 | 0 | 1 | 0 | 0 | 0 | 3 | 0 |
| Paul Williams (2nd spell) | England | 1995 | 7 | 0 | 0 | 0 | 0 | 0 | 0 | 0 | 0 | 0 | 7 | 0 |
| Robbie Williams | England | 2007–2010 | 68 (9) | 4 | 6 | 2 | 2 | 1 | 1 (1) | 0 | 1 (1) | 0 | 78 (11) | 7 |
| Ken Willingham | England | 1931–1945 | 247 | 4 | 23 | 1 | 0 | 0 | 0 | 0 | 0 | 0 | 270 | 5 |
| Chris Willock | England | 2020 | 8 (6) | 2 | 0 | 0 | 0 | 0 | 0 | 0 | 0 | 0 | 8 (6) | 2 |
| Charlie Wilson | England | 1922–1926 | 99 | 57 | 8 | 5 | 0 | 0 | 0 | 0 | 0 | 0 | 107 | 62 |
| George Wilson | Scotland | 1928–1929 | 1 | 1 | 0 | 0 | 0 | 0 | 0 | 0 | 0 | 0 | 1 | 1 |
| Paul Wilson | England | 1985–1987 | 15 | 0 | 0 | 0 | 1 | 0 | 0 | 0 | 0 | 0 | 16 | 0 |
| Phil Wilson | England | 1981–1987 | 229 (4) | 16 | 14 | 0 | 24 | 1 | 1 | 0 | 0 | 0 | 268 (4) | 17 |
| Ray Wilson | England | 1952–1964 | 266 | 6 | 13 | 0 | 4 | 0 | 0 | 0 | 0 | 0 | 283 | 6 |
| Robert Wilson | England | 1989–1991 | 52 (5) | 8 | 5 | 0 | 5 | 2 | 5 | 0 | 0 | 0 | 67 (5) | 10 |
| Tom Wilson | England | 1919–1931 | 448 | 4 | 52 | 0 | 0 | 0 | 0 | 0 | 0 | 0 | 500 | 4 |
| Julian Winter | England | 1982–1989 | 89 (4) | 5 | 6 (1) | 0 | 2 (1) | 0 | 5 (1) | 0 | 0 | 0 | 102 (7) | 5 |
| Dick Witham | England | 1930–1934 | 4 | 0 | 0 | 0 | 0 | 0 | 0 | 0 | 0 | 0 | 4 | 0 |
| Peter Withe | England | 1988–1991 | 22 (16) | 1 | 2 (2) | 1 | 2 | 0 | 0 (3) | 1 | 0 | 0 | 26 (21) | 3 |
| Ernest Womersley | England | 1949–1957 | 2 | 0 | 0 | 0 | 0 | 0 | 0 | 0 | 0 | 0 | 2 | 0 |
| Chris Wood | England | 1961–1975 | 7 | 0 | 0 | 0 | 0 | 0 | 0 | 0 | 0 | 0 | 7 | 0 |
| James Wood | England | 1915–1922 | 127 | 0 | 17 | 0 | 0 | 0 | 0 | 0 | 0 | 0 | 144 | 0 |
| John Wood | England | 1910–1911 | 10 | 0 | 0 | 0 | 0 | 0 | 0 | 0 | 0 | 0 | 10 | 0 |
| Ray Wood | England | 1958–1965 | 207 | 0 | 11 | 0 | 5 | 0 | 0 | 0 | 0 | 0 | 223 | 0 |
| Calum Woods | England | 2011–2014 | 54 (18) | 1 | 4 | 0 | 1 | 0 | 1 | 0 | 3 | 0 | 63 (18) | 1 |
| Frank Worthington | England | 1966–1972 | 166 (5) | 41 | 12 | 5 | 9 | 2 | 0 | 0 | 0 | 0 | 187 (5) | 48 |
| Jon Worthington | England | 2002–2009 | 184 (29) | 12 | 7 | 0 | 7 | 1 | 4 (1) | 0 | 5 | 1 | 207 (30) | 14 |
| James Wright | Ireland | 1910–1911 | 2 | 0 | 0 | 0 | 0 | 0 | 0 | 0 | 0 | 0 | 2 | 0 |
| Mark Wright (1st spell) | England | 1991 | 10 | 1 | 0 | 0 | 0 | 0 | 0 | 0 | 0 | 0 | 10 | 1 |
| Mark Wright (2nd spell) | England | 1991–1993 | 15 (7) | 0 | 4 (2) | 0 | 3 | 0 | 2 (3) | 0 | 0 | 0 | 24 (12) | 0 |
| William Wright | England | 1920–1921 | 9 | 4 | 3 | 1 | 0 | 0 | 0 | 0 | 0 | 0 | 12 | 5 |
| Harry Yates | England | 1945–1950 | 1 | 0 | 0 | 0 | 0 | 0 | 0 | 0 | 0 | 0 | 1 | 0 |
| Steve Yates | England | 2003–2005 | 50 (2) | 1 | 1 | 0 | 3 | 0 | 1 | 0 | 3 | 0 | 58 (2) | 1 |
| Eddie Youds | England | 2002–2003 | 25 | 0 | 0 | 0 | 0 | 0 | 0 | 0 | 0 | 0 | 25 | 0 |
| Alf Young | England | 1927–1945 | 283 | 6 | 26 | 0 | 0 | 0 | 0 | 0 | 0 | 0 | 309 | 6 |
| Matty Young | England | 2006–2008 | 20 (19) | 2 | 0 (1) | 0 | 0 | 0 | 1 (1) | 0 | 0 | 0 | 21 (21) | 2 |
| John Yuill | Scotland | 1935–1936 | 1 | 0 | 0 | 0 | 0 | 0 | 0 | 0 | 0 | 0 | 1 | 0 |
