= 1961–62 Huddersfield Town A.F.C. season =

Huddersfield Town
1961–62 season
- Chairman: Stephen Lister
- Manager: Eddie Boot
- Stadium: Leeds Road
- Football League Second Division: 7th
- FA Cup: Fourth round (eliminated by Aston Villa)
- Football League Cup: Second round (eliminated by Leeds United)
- Top goalscorer: League: Derek Stokes (14); All: Derek Stokes (14)
- Highest home attendance: 28,071 vs Rotherham United (9 January 1962)
- Lowest home attendance: 5,256 vs Preston North End (2 April 1962)
- Biggest win: 5–1 vs Plymouth Argyle (23 August 1961); 4–0 vs Derby County (9 April 1962)
- Biggest defeat: 0–3 vs Leyton Orient (20 September 1961); 0–3 vs Stoke City (28 October 1961); 0–3 vs Rotherham United (28 April 1962)

Huddersfield Town's 1961–62 campaign was an impressive season for the Town, following the previous season's near miss with relegation to Division 3. In Eddie Boot's first full season in charge, Town finished in 7th place in Division 2 with 44 points, 10 off 2nd placed Leyton Orient and a further 8 behind league champions Liverpool.

== Squad at the start of the season ==
Note: Flags indicate national team as defined under FIFA eligibility rules; some limited exceptions apply. Players may hold more than one non-FIFA nationality.

Pos.	Nation	Player
GK	ENG	Harry Fearnley
GK	ENG	Ray Wood
DF	ENG	Denis Atkins
DF	ENG	John Coddington
DF	ENG	Brian Gibson
DF	ENG	Stewart Holden
DF	ENG	Ray Holt
DF	ENG	Bob Ledger
DF	ENG	Bob Parker
DF	IRL	Pat Saward
DF	ENG	Ken Taylor
DF	ENG	Ken Turner

Pos.	Nation	Player
DF	ENG	Ray Wilson
MF	ENG	John Bettany
MF	IRL	Ollie Conmy
MF	ENG	Peter Dinsdale
MF	SCO	Jim Kerray
MF	SCO	John McCann
MF	ENG	Kevin McHale
MF	ENG	John Milner
MF	ENG	Michael O'Grady
FW	ENG	Chris Balderstone
FW	SCO	Les Massie
FW	ENG	Derek Stokes

== Review ==
After just missing out on relegation to Division 3, Eddie Boot took his first full season in charge to try to raise Town up to the top half of the Division 2. Town made a promising start with 4 wins from their first 6 games, including a 5–1 win against Plymouth Argyle and a 4–3 win at Luton Town. Derek Stokes had a great start to the season with 8 goals from the first 9 league games including a hat-trick in the 4–2 win against Walsall. An indifferent spell in October and November saw Town lose ground, but a player exchange in February would see Town surge up the table.

Jim Kerray moved to Newcastle United with experienced striker Len White returning to his native Yorkshire. His 8 goals in 16 matches propelled Town to the upper reaches of the Division 2. They would finish the season in 7th place with 44 points.

== Squad at the end of the season ==
Note: Flags indicate national team as defined under FIFA eligibility rules; some limited exceptions apply. Players may hold more than one non-FIFA nationality.

Pos.	Nation	Player
GK	ENG	Harry Fearnley
GK	ENG	Ray Wood
DF	ENG	Denis Atkins
DF	ENG	John Coddington
DF	ENG	Brian Gibson
DF	ENG	Stewart Holden
DF	ENG	Ray Holt
DF	ENG	Bob Ledger
DF	ENG	Bob Parker
DF	IRL	Pat Saward
DF	ENG	Ken Taylor
DF	ENG	Ken Turner

Pos.	Nation	Player
DF	ENG	Ray Wilson
MF	ENG	John Bettany
MF	IRL	Ollie Conmy
MF	ENG	Peter Dinsdale
MF	SCO	John McCann
MF	ENG	Kevin McHale
MF	ENG	John Milner
MF	ENG	Michael O'Grady
FW	ENG	Chris Balderstone
FW	SCO	Les Massie
FW	ENG	Derek Stokes
FW	ENG	Len White

== Results ==
=== Division Two ===
Date	Opponents	Home/ Away	Result F – A	Scorers	Attendance	Position
19 August 1961	Swansea Town	A	1–1	Stokes	18,208	11th
23 August 1961	Plymouth Argyle	H	5–1	Stokes (2), Kerray, O'Grady, Massie	13,730	5th
26 August 1961	Southampton	H	1–0	Patrick (og)	13,998	3rd
30 August 1961	Plymouth Argyle	A	2–4	Kerray, Stokes (pen)	14,065	6th
2 September 1961	Luton Town	A	4–3	Dinsdale, Stokes (2), Saward	14,436	4th
9 September 1961	Newcastle United	H	2–1	Kerray, Massie	18,087	3rd
16 September 1961	Middlesbrough	A	0–1		14,003	6th
20 September 1961	Leyton Orient	A	0–3		8,957	10th
23 September 1961	Walsall	H	4–2	Stokes (3), Sharples (og)	15,100	5th
27 September 1961	Leyton Orient	H	1–1	Bettany	16,917	6th
30 September 1961	Derby County	A	0–1		13,455	6th
7 October 1961	Norwich City	H	1–1	McHale	14,910	8th
14 October 1961	Leeds United	A	0–1		19,162	11th
21 October 1961	Bristol Rovers	H	4–1	Kerray, Stokes (2), Frowen (og)	11,845	8th
28 October 1961	Stoke City	A	0–3		35,974	9th
4 November 1961	Sunderland	H	0–0		19,017	9th
11 November 1961	Brighton & Hove Albion	A	2–2	Kerray (2)	10,742	10th
18 November 1961	Liverpool	H	1–2	McHale	23,086	13th
25 November 1961	Charlton Athletic	A	2–0	Massie, O'Grady	12,187	10th
2 December 1961	Bury	H	2–0	Kerray, Coddington (pen)	11,914	9th
8 December 1961	Rotherham United	A	3–3	Massie, Kerray, McHale	10,241	9th
23 December 1961	Southampton	A	1–3	McHale	11,262	12th
26 December 1961	Preston North End	A	0–1		15,524	13th
13 January 1962	Luton Town	H	1–2	Coddington (pen)	11,140	14th
20 January 1962	Newcastle United	A	1–1	O'Grady	31,950	14th
3 February 1962	Middlesbrough	H	0–0		11,619	14th
10 February 1962	Walsall	A	2–2	McHale, Balderstone	10,864	16th
24 February 1962	Norwich City	A	2–1	White (2)	16,112	13th
3 March 1962	Leeds United	H	2–1	White, Massie	16,799	12th
10 March 1962	Bristol Rovers	A	1–1	White	10,712	12th
17 March 1962	Stoke City	H	3–0	White (2), Stokes	20,261	10th
24 March 1962	Sunderland	A	1–3	Balderstone	26,412	12th
26 March 1962	Swansea Town	H	3–1	Coddington (2 pens), Massie	7,813	9th
31 March 1962	Brighton & Hove Albion	H	2–0	Baxter (og), McHale	8,187	9th
2 April 1962	Preston North End	H	2–2	McHale, Balderstone	5,256	8th
7 April 1962	Liverpool	A	1–1	Balderstone	38,022	8th
9 April 1962	Derby County	H	4–0	Stokes, White, Coddington (2 pens)	8,323	6th
14 April 1962	Charlton Athletic	H	0–2		9,127	7th
21 April 1962	Bury	A	2–1	McHale (2)	7,630	6th
23 April 1962	Scunthorpe United	H	1–2	Stokes	12,397	7th
24 April 1962	Scunthorpe United	A	3–1	White, O'Grady, Massie	10,812	6th
28 April 1962	Rotherham United	H	0–3		8,679	7th

=== FA Cup ===
Date	Round	Opponents	Home/ Away	Result F – A	Scorers	Attendance
9 January 1962	Round 3	Rotherham United	H	4–3	Massie, McHale (2), Kerray	28,071
27 January 1962	Round 4	Aston Villa	A	1–2	McHale 69'	38,013

=== Football League Cup ===
Date	Round	Opponents	Home/ Away	Result F – A	Scorers	Attendance
12 September 1961	Round 1	Carlisle United	A	1–1	Massie	7,360
25 September 1961	Round 1 Replay	Carlisle United	H	3–0	McCann, Holt (2)	8,880
4 October 1961	Round 2	Leeds United	A	2–3	McHale 69', Dinsdale 85'	10,023

== Appearances and goals ==
Name	Nationality	Position	League		FA Cup		League Cup		Total	
Name	Nationality	Position	Apps	Goals	Apps	Goals	Apps	Goals	Apps	Goals
Denis Atkins	England	DF	28	0	1	0	2	0	31	0
Chris Balderstone	England	MF	9	4	0	0	1	0	10	4
John Bettany	England	MF	8	1	0	0	1	0	9	1
John Coddington	England	DF	38	6	2	0	1	0	41	6
Peter Dinsdale	England	DF	40	1	2	0	3	1	45	2
Harry Fearnley	England	GK	25	0	1	0	3	0	29	0
Brian Gibson	England	DF	0	0	1	0	0	0	1	0
Ray Holt	England	DF	3	0	0	0	2	2	5	2
Jim Kerray	Scotland	MF	26	8	2	1	3	0	31	9
Bob Ledger	England	MF	2	0	0	0	2	0	4	0
Les Massie	Scotland	FW	31	7	2	1	1	0	34	8
John McCann	Scotland	MF	8	0	0	0	1	1	9	1
Kevin McHale	England	MF	40	9	2	3	2	1	44	13
John Milner	England	MF	8	0	0	0	0	0	8	0
Michael O'Grady	England	MF	38	4	2	0	2	0	42	4
Bob Parker	England	DF	10	0	0	0	2	0	12	0
Pat Saward	Republic of Ireland	MF	32	1	1	0	3	0	36	1
Derek Stokes	England	FW	37	14	2	0	2	0	41	14
Ken Taylor	England	DF	2	0	1	0	0	0	3	0
Ken Turner	England	DF	5	0	0	0	1	0	6	0
Len White	England	FW	16	8	0	0	0	0	16	8
Ray Wilson	England	DF	39	0	2	0	1	0	42	0
Ray Wood	England	GK	17	0	1	0	0	0	18	0
