= 1962–63 Huddersfield Town A.F.C. season =

Huddersfield Town
1962–63 season
- Chairman: Dick Parker
- Manager: Eddie Boot
- Stadium: Leeds Road
- Football League Second Division: 6th
- FA Cup: Third round (eliminated by Manchester United)
- Football League Cup: Second round (eliminated by Bradford (Park Avenue))
- Top goalscorer: League: Derek Stokes (18); All: Derek Stokes (18)
- Highest home attendance: 34,946 vs Leeds United (1 September 1962)
- Lowest home attendance: 7,964 vs Swansea Town (6 May 1963)
- Biggest win: 5–0 vs Middlesbrough (25 August 1962)
- Biggest defeat: 0–5 vs Manchester United (4 March 1963)

Huddersfield Town's 1962–63 campaign was an impressive season for the Town. They finished 6th in Division 2, just 4 points off Chelsea, who took the second promotion spot to Division 1. They finished their campaign on the same points as Leeds United.

== Squad at the start of the season ==
Note: Flags indicate national team as defined under FIFA eligibility rules; some limited exceptions apply. Players may hold more than one non-FIFA nationality.

Pos.	Nation	Player
GK	ENG	Harry Fearnley
GK	ENG	Ray Wood
DF	ENG	Denis Atkins
DF	ENG	John Coddington
DF	ENG	Stewart Holden
DF	ENG	Ray Holt
DF	ENG	Bob Parker
DF	IRL	Pat Saward
DF	ENG	Ken Taylor
DF	ENG	Ray Wilson
MF	ENG	John Bettany
MF	IRL	Ollie Conmy

Pos.	Nation	Player
MF	ENG	Peter Dinsdale
MF	SCO	Billy Fraser
MF	SCO	John McCann
MF	ENG	Kevin McHale
MF	ENG	John Milner
MF	ENG	Michael O'Grady
FW	ENG	Chris Balderstone
FW	ENG	Allan Gilliver
FW	SCO	Les Massie
FW	ENG	Derek Stokes
FW	ENG	Len White

== Review ==
After the success of the previous season, Town under Eddie Boot were hoping to mount yet another promotion push to Division 1. An impressive start to the season saw Town unbeaten in their first 13 league games of the season. This run was ended by a home defeat from Southampton on 27 October. A mixed November and December saw Town lose ground, but an amazingly cold snap during the winter would see the team out of action for 3 months at Leeds Road. During that time, Town played only 3 away league games and an FA Cup game at Manchester United. Town would have to play their last 20 games in 2 1/2 months.

It was a tall order and Town's impressive start to the season slowly evaporated. Too many draws and losses during the period saw Town lose ground with the leading pack of Stoke City, Chelsea and Sunderland. A win over Leeds United in May, gave Town a faint hope of promotion, but 2 defeats to Portsmouth and Cardiff City saw Town finish down in 6th place with 48 points.

== Squad at the end of the season ==
Note: Flags indicate national team as defined under FIFA eligibility rules; some limited exceptions apply. Players may hold more than one non-FIFA nationality.

Pos.	Nation	Player
GK	ENG	Harry Fearnley
GK	ENG	Ray Wood
DF	ENG	Denis Atkins
DF	ENG	John Coddington
DF	ENG	Stewart Holden
DF	ENG	Ray Holt
DF	ENG	Bob Parker
DF	ENG	Ken Taylor
DF	ENG	Ray Wilson
MF	ENG	John Bettany
MF	IRL	Ollie Conmy

Pos.	Nation	Player
MF	ENG	Peter Dinsdale
MF	SCO	Billy Fraser
MF	ENG	Kevin McHale
MF	ENG	John Milner
MF	ENG	Michael O'Grady
FW	ENG	Chris Balderstone
FW	ENG	Allan Gilliver
FW	SCO	Les Massie
FW	ENG	John Rudge
FW	ENG	Derek Stokes
FW	ENG	Len White

== Results ==
=== Division Two ===
Date	Opponents	Home/ Away	Result F – A	Scorers	Attendance	Position
18 August 1962	Derby County	H	3–3	O'Grady, Stokes, Barrowclough (og)	10,660	8th
21 August 1962	Walsall	A	1–1	Stokes	13,505	8th
25 August 1962	Middlesbrough	A	5–0	Stokes (2), Jones (og), Wilson, McHale	18,470	4th
29 August 1962	Walsall	H	4–0	Massie (2), O'Grady, White	12,310	1st
1 September 1962	Leeds United	H	1–1	White	34,946	6th
5 September 1962	Norwich City	A	3–2	O'Grady (3)	28,794	1st
8 September 1962	Cardiff City	H	1–0	White	17,573	1st
12 September 1962	Norwich City	H	0–0		13,285	1st
15 September 1962	Portsmouth	A	1–1	Stokes	18,410	1st
22 September 1962	Preston North End	H	1–0	White	17,594	1st
29 September 1962	Plymouth Argyle	A	1–1	Stokes	20,125	1st
6 October 1962	Swansea Town	A	2–1	White, Stokes	11,024	1st
13 October 1962	Chelsea	H	1–0	Stokes	23,936	1st
27 October 1962	Southampton	H	2–3	Massie, White	15,589	2nd
2 November 1962	Scunthorpe United	A	2–2	Balderstone (2)	8,908	1st
10 November 1962	Bury	H	0–1		17,214	5th
17 November 1962	Rotherham United	A	2–0	Stokes, McHale	11,589	5th
24 November 1962	Charlton Athletic	H	2–0	White (pen), Dinsdale	12,435	3rd
1 December 1962	Stoke City	A	1–2	Stokes	29,856	5th
8 December 1962	Sunderland	H	0–3		21,260	5th
15 December 1962	Derby County	A	1–2	O'Grady	9,076	7th
29 December 1962	Grimsby Town	A	1–1	McHale	9,814	7th
2 March 1963	Chelsea	A	2–1	O'Grady, White	32,427	9th
9 March 1963	Luton Town	H	2–0	Stokes, Kelly (og)	10,279	7th
16 March 1963	Luton Town	A	2–3	Balderstone, O'Grady	5,507	9th
20 March 1963	Southampton	A	1–3	Stokes	11,957	10th
23 March 1963	Scunthorpe United	H	2–0	Stokes, White	11,002	10th
30 March 1963	Bury	A	1–1	White	7,768	7th
1 April 1963	Plymouth Argyle	H	4–2	Stokes (2), Massie (2)	8,452	5th
6 April 1963	Rotherham United	H	1–0	Stokes	14,015	6th
12 April 1963	Newcastle United	A	1–1	O'Grady	49,672	6th
13 April 1963	Charlton Athletic	A	0–1		13,008	7th
16 April 1963	Newcastle United	H	2–1	Coddington (pen), McHale	22,022	6th
20 April 1963	Stoke City	H	3–3	White, Stokes (2)	27,779	6th
24 April 1963	Grimsby Town	H	0–0		14,281	6th
27 April 1963	Sunderland	A	1–1	O'Grady	37,098	6th
29 April 1963	Middlesbrough	H	0–0		14,000	4th
4 May 1963	Preston North End	A	0–2		11,770	6th
6 May 1963	Swansea Town	H	4–1	Bettany, White, McHale, Gilliver	7,964	6th
11 May 1963	Leeds United	A	1–0	McHale	28,501	4th
13 May 1963	Portsmouth	H	1–3	White	12,854	4th
18 May 1963	Cardiff City	A	0–3		8,774	5th: Town didn't drop to 6th until Leeds United played their matches at a later date.

=== FA Cup ===
Date	Round	Opponents	Home/ Away	Result F – A	Scorers	Attendance
4 March 1963	Round 3	Manchester United	A	0–5		47,703

=== Football League Cup ===
Date	Round	Opponents	Home/ Away	Result F – A	Scorers	Attendance
26 September 1962	Round 2	Bradford (Park Avenue)	A	1–3	Balderstone	6,931

== Appearances and goals ==
Name	Nationality	Position	League		FA Cup		League Cup		Total	
Name	Nationality	Position	Apps	Goals	Apps	Goals	Apps	Goals	Apps	Goals
Denis Atkins	England	DF	41	0	1	0	1	0	43	0
Chris Balderstone	England	MF	17	3	0	0	1	1	18	4
John Bettany	England	MF	20	1	1	0	1	0	22	1
John Coddington	England	DF	26	1	0	0	0	0	26	1
Ollie Conmy	Republic of Ireland	MF	2	0	0	0	1	0	3	0
Peter Dinsdale	England	DF	42	1	1	0	1	1	44	1
Harry Fearnley	England	GK	1	0	0	0	0	0	1	0
Allan Gilliver	England	FW	3	1	0	0	1	0	4	1
Stewart Holden	England	MF	1	0	0	0	1	0	2	0
Ray Holt	England	DF	0	0	0	0	1	0	1	0
Les Massie	Scotland	FW	33	5	1	0	0	0	34	5
John McCann	Scotland	MF	1	0	0	0	0	0	1	0
Kevin McHale	England	MF	37	6	1	0	0	0	38	6
John Milner	England	MF	2	0	0	0	1	0	3	0
Michael O'Grady	England	MF	41	10	1	0	0	0	42	10
Bob Parker	England	DF	5	0	1	0	1	0	7	0
John Rudge	England	MF	1	0	0	0	0	0	1	0
Pat Saward	Republic of Ireland	MF	19	0	0	0	0	0	19	0
Derek Stokes	England	FW	35	18	1	0	0	0	36	18
Ken Taylor	England	DF	21	0	1	0	0	0	22	0
Len White	England	FW	40	13	1	0	0	0	41	13
Ray Wilson	England	DF	33	1	0	0	0	0	33	1
Ray Wood	England	GK	41	0	1	0	1	0	43	0
