= 1960–61 Huddersfield Town A.F.C. season =

Huddersfield Town
1960–61 season
- Chairman: Stephen Lister
- Manager: Eddie Boot
- Stadium: Leeds Road
- Football League Second Division: 20th
- FA Cup: Fourth round (eliminated by Barnsley)
- Football League Cup: Second round (eliminated by Aston Villa)
- Top goalscorer: League: Derek Stokes (16); All: Derek Stokes (18)
- Highest home attendance: 46,155 vs Wolverhampton Wanderers (11 January 1961)
- Lowest home attendance: 5,860 vs Brighton & Hove Albion (3 December 1960)
- Biggest win: 4–0 vs Bristol Rovers (29 April 1961)
- Biggest defeat: 1–5 vs Plymouth Argyle (24 September 1960)

Huddersfield Town's 1960–61 campaign was Town's worst ever season to date. They missed out on relegation to Division Three for the first time in their history. They finished the season in 20th place, just two points ahead of relegated Portsmouth. Their main high point of the season was the defeat of FA Cup holders Wolverhampton Wanderers in the third round of the FA Cup.

== Squad at the start of the season ==
Note: Flags indicate national team as defined under FIFA eligibility rules; some limited exceptions apply. Players may hold more than one non-FIFA nationality.

Pos.	Nation	Player
GK	ENG	Harry Fearnley
GK	ENG	Ray Wood
DF	ENG	Denis Atkins
DF	ENG	John Coddington
DF	ENG	Colin Howarth
DF	ENG	Brian Gibson
DF	ENG	Bob Ledger
DF	SCO	Gordon Low
DF	ENG	Bill McGarry
DF	ENG	Bob Parker
DF	ENG	Ken Taylor

Pos.	Nation	Player
DF	ENG	Ray Wilson
MF	IRL	Ollie Conmy
MF	ENG	Peter Dinsdale
MF	SCO	Jim Kerray
MF	ENG	Kevin McHale
MF	ENG	John Milner
MF	ENG	Michael O'Grady
FW	ENG	Chris Balderstone
FW	SCO	Les Massie
FW	ENG	Derek Stokes

== Review ==
Following Denis Law's record-breaking departure to Manchester City the previous season, Town's strikeforce was severely depleted, despite the purchase of Derek Stokes from neighbours Bradford City. Town's start was somewhat decent in the strike department, but the defence department was leaking goals leading Town down the table to the relegation trapdoor to Division Three. Not even a 4–1 win over rivals Leeds United at their home Elland Road gave Town much joy during the season. As Town were dropping rapidly down the table Aston Villa's Pat Saward was brought in to stop the slide. Les Massie & Derek Stokes' 31 league goals helped Town survive the drop by just two points from Portsmouth. They finished 20th with just 35 points, their closest shave with relegation in their history.

Their season will be best remembered for their exploits in the FA Cup. Their third round match was against the holders and Division One leaders Wolverhampton Wanderers. At the time, Town were bottom of Division Two and travelled to Molineux Stadium with virtually no chance of victory expected. They managed a 1–1 draw thanks to a goal by Stokes. The replay at Leeds Road was the first match to use the newly erected "Denis Law Lights" and saw Town victorious by the score of 2–1 with goals from Stokes and Michael O'Grady. They eventually lost to Barnsley in the next round.

== Squad at the end of the season ==
Note: Flags indicate national team as defined under FIFA eligibility rules; some limited exceptions apply. Players may hold more than one non-FIFA nationality.

Pos.	Nation	Player
GK	ENG	Harry Fearnley
GK	ENG	Ray Wood
DF	ENG	Denis Atkins
DF	ENG	John Coddington
DF	ENG	Brian Gibson
DF	ENG	Stewart Holden
DF	ENG	Bob Ledger
DF	ENG	Bob Parker
DF	IRL	Pat Saward
DF	ENG	Ken Taylor
DF	ENG	Ray Wilson

Pos.	Nation	Player
MF	ENG	John Bettany
MF	IRL	Ollie Conmy
MF	ENG	Peter Dinsdale
MF	SCO	Jim Kerray
MF	SCO	John McCann
MF	ENG	Kevin McHale
MF	ENG	John Milner
MF	ENG	Michael O'Grady
FW	ENG	Chris Balderstone
FW	SCO	Les Massie
FW	ENG	Derek Stokes

== Results ==
=== Division Two ===
Date	Opponents	Home/ Away	Result F – A	Scorers	Attendance	Position
20 August 1960	Luton Town	H	1–1	Stokes	18,156	9th
23 August 1960	Swansea Town	A	0–2		15,295	15th
27 August 1960	Lincoln City	A	0–0		8,639	19th
31 August 1960	Swansea Town	H	3–1	Stokes, Massie, McHale	12,913	10th
3 September 1960	Portsmouth	H	3–3	Massie, Stokes (2)	15,237	11th
6 September 1960	Sheffield United	A	1–3	Stokes (pen)	14,258	15th
10 September 1960	Leeds United	A	4–1	Stokes (2, 1 pen), Charlton (og), Balderstone	22,146	11th
14 September 1960	Sheffield United	H	0–1		12,346	15th
17 September 1960	Sunderland	A	2–1	McGarry, Stokes	21,336	10th
24 September 1960	Plymouth Argyle	H	1–5	Holden	14,154	14th
1 October 1960	Norwich City	A	0–2		25,304	16th
8 October 1960	Southampton	H	3–1	Massie, McCann, Stokes	11,220	12th
15 October 1960	Rotherham United	A	2–2	Massie, Taylor	10,961	13th
22 October 1960	Liverpool	H	2–4	Massie, Taylor	15,719	15th
29 October 1960	Bristol Rovers	A	2–1	Stokes (2)	15,381	13th
5 November 1960	Derby County	H	1–3	Stokes (pen)	11,770	14th
19 November 1960	Scunthorpe United	H	1–2	John (og)	8,617	17th
26 November 1960	Ipswich Town	A	2–4	Stokes, Low	11,056	18th
3 December 1960	Brighton & Hove Albion	H	0–1		5,860	20th
10 December 1960	Middlesbrough	A	1–2	McNeil (og)	9,948	21st
17 December 1960	Luton Town	A	0–1		11,219	21st
24 December 1960	Stoke City	A	2–2	O'Grady, Massie	12,029	21st
26 December 1960	Stoke City	H	0–0		13,783	19th
31 December 1960	Lincoln City	H	4–1	Massie, Stokes, Bettany, O'Grady	11,564	19th
14 January 1961	Portsmouth	A	3–1	Massie, McHale, Balderstone	11,243	18th
21 January 1961	Leeds United	H	0–1		18,938	18th
4 February 1961	Sunderland	H	4–2	Bettany (2), Balderstone (2)	16,341	17th
11 February 1961	Plymouth Argyle	A	1–2	Kerray	12,876	18th
21 February 1961	Norwich City	H	1–1	Kerray	16,984	16th
25 February 1961	Southampton	A	2–4	Kerray, McHale	14,368	18th
4 March 1961	Rotherham United	H	0–1		15,144	19th
11 March 1961	Liverpool	A	1–3	Kerray	29,733	20th
18 March 1961	Middlesbrough	H	1–0	Massie	11,788	20th
21 March 1961	Leyton Orient	A	0–2		10,099	20th
25 March 1961	Derby County	A	1–1	Dinsdale	9,524	20th
31 March 1961	Charlton Athletic	A	3–2	Massie (2), Balderstone	12,980	20th
1 April 1961	Ipswich Town	H	1–3	McHale	16,459	20th
3 April 1961	Charlton Athletic	H	2–2	Balderstone, Massie	12,542	20th
8 April 1961	Scunthorpe United	A	1–0	Massie	8,352	20th
15 April 1961	Leyton Orient	H	1–0	Massie	12,247	19th
22 April 1961	Brighton & Hove Albion	A	1–2	O'Grady	13,088	20th
29 April 1961	Bristol Rovers	H	4–0	Stokes (2), O'Grady, Massie	10,322	19th

=== FA Cup ===
Date	Round	Opponents	Home/ Away	Result F – A	Scorers	Attendance
7 January 1961	Round 3	Wolverhampton Wanderers	A	1–1	Stokes 43'	31,403
11 January 1961	Round 3 Replay	Wolverhampton Wanderers	H	2–1	Stokes 3', O'Grady 75'	46,155
1 February 1961	Round 4	Barnsley	H	1–1	Coddington (pen)	44,761
6 February 1961	Round 4 Replay	Barnsley	A	0–1		29,149

=== Football League Cup ===
Date	Round	Opponents	Home/ Away	Result F – A	Scorers	Attendance
12 October 1960	Round 2	Aston Villa	A	1–4	Milner	17,057

== Appearances and goals ==
Name	Nationality	Position	League		FA Cup		League Cup		Total	
Name	Nationality	Position	Apps	Goals	Apps	Goals	Apps	Goals	Apps	Goals
Denis Atkins	England	DF	3	0	0	0	0	0	3	0
Chris Balderstone	England	MF	29	6	3	0	1	0	33	6
John Bettany	England	MF	7	3	3	0	0	0	10	3
John Coddington	England	DF	41	0	4	1	1	0	46	1
Ollie Conmy	Republic of Ireland	MF	1	0	0	0	0	0	1	0
Jack Connor	England	DF	2	0	0	0	0	0	2	0
Peter Dinsdale	England	DF	24	1	3	0	0	0	27	1
Harry Fearnley	England	GK	23	0	4	0	0	0	27	0
Brian Gibson	England	DF	16	0	0	0	1	0	17	0
Stewart Holden	England	MF	1	1	0	0	0	0	1	1
Jim Kerray	Scotland	MF	28	4	0	0	1	0	29	4
Bob Ledger	England	MF	1	0	0	0	0	0	1	0
Gordon Low	Scotland	DF	7	1	0	0	1	0	8	1
Les Massie	Scotland	FW	42	15	4	0	1	0	47	15
John McCann	Scotland	MF	11	1	0	0	0	0	11	1
Bill McGarry	England	DF	19	1	1	0	0	0	20	1
Kevin McHale	England	MF	34	4	4	0	0	0	38	4
John Milner	England	MF	7	0	0	0	1	1	8	1
Michael O'Grady	England	MF	23	4	4	1	0	0	27	5
Bob Parker	England	DF	30	0	4	0	1	0	35	0
Pat Saward	Republic of Ireland	MF	8	0	0	0	0	0	8	0
Derek Stokes	England	FW	33	16	4	2	1	0	38	18
Ken Taylor	England	DF	21	2	2	0	1	0	24	2
Ray Wilson	England	DF	32	0	4	0	0	0	36	0
Ray Wood	England	GK	19	0	0	0	1	0	20	0
