= 1964–65 Huddersfield Town A.F.C. season =

Huddersfield Town
1964–65 season
- Chairman: Roger B. Kaye
- Manager: Eddie Boot (until 2 September 1964); Tom Johnston (from 26 October 1964)
- Stadium: Leeds Road
- Football League Second Division: 8th
- FA Cup: Fourth round (eliminated by Swansea Town)
- Football League Cup: Second round (eliminated by Leeds United)
- Top goalscorer: League: Les Massie (10); All: Les Massie (11)
- Highest home attendance: 14,405 vs Manchester City (27 February 1965)
- Lowest home attendance: 5,533 vs Swansea Town (5 December 1964)
- Biggest win: 4–0 vs Swansea Town (5 December 1964)
- Biggest defeat: 1–4 vs Southampton (19 September 1964); 1–4 vs Swindon Town (26 September 1964); 0–3 vs Crystal Palace (14 November 1964); 0–3 vs Portsmouth (20 February 1965)

Huddersfield Town's 1964–65 campaign was mainly a season of change for the Town, with Roger B. Kaye becoming the new chairman just before the start of the season, followed by the departure of manager Eddie Boot after just 3 games. Tom Johnston would then give Town a big boost for the rest of the season. A superb second half of the season saw Town only lose 3 league games in 1965, which would eventually lead Town to 8th place in Division 2.

== Squad at the start of the season ==
Note: Flags indicate national team as defined under FIFA eligibility rules; some limited exceptions apply. Players may hold more than one non-FIFA nationality.

Pos.	Nation	Player
GK	IRL	John Oldfield
GK	ENG	Ray Wood
DF	ENG	Denis Atkins
DF	ENG	John Coddington
DF	ENG	Stewart Holden
DF	ENG	Ray Holt
DF	ENG	Bob McNab
DF	IRL	Mick Meagan
DF	ENG	Bob Parker
DF	ENG	Ken Taylor
MF	ENG	John Bettany
MF	ENG	Peter Dinsdale

Pos.	Nation	Player
MF	SCO	Billy Fraser
MF	ENG	Kevin McHale
MF	ENG	Michael O'Grady
MF	ENG	Steve Smith
FW	ENG	Chris Balderstone
FW	ENG	Allan Gilliver
FW	ENG	Kevin Lewis
FW	SCO	Les Massie
FW	ENG	John Rudge
FW	ENG	Derek Stokes
FW	ENG	Len White

== Review ==
Following the previous season's mid-table position, gates at Leeds Road drastically fell, no match recorded a crowd of more than 15,000 during the season. It wasn't helped by the dreadful start made by the Town, which cost Eddie Boot his job in early September. Town failed to win any of their first 9 matches. Tom Johnston would replace Boot and brought in Jimmy Nicholson, Tony Leighton and Johnny Quigley. But, Town's form didn't seem to completely improve until Town reached December.

Town's new acquisitions would help Town's form improve during the second half of the season, which would see Town lose only 3 times in the second half of the season. It would see Town finish in 8th place with 44 points, 12 points behind 2nd placed Northampton Town.

== Squad at the end of the season ==
Note: Flags indicate national team as defined under FIFA eligibility rules; some limited exceptions apply. Players may hold more than one non-FIFA nationality.

Pos.	Nation	Player
GK	IRL	John Oldfield
GK	ENG	Ray Wood
DF	ENG	Denis Atkins
DF	ENG	Chris Cattlin
DF	ENG	John Coddington
DF	ENG	Stewart Holden
DF	ENG	Ray Holt
DF	ENG	Billy Legg
DF	ENG	Bob McNab
DF	IRL	Mick Meagan
DF	ENG	Bob Parker
DF	ENG	Derek Parkin
MF	ENG	Peter Dinsdale

Pos.	Nation	Player
MF	SCO	Billy Fraser
MF	ENG	Kevin McHale
MF	NIR	Jimmy Nicholson
MF	ENG	Michael O'Grady
MF	SCO	Johnny Quigley
MF	ENG	Steve Smith
FW	ENG	Chris Balderstone
FW	ENG	Allan Gilliver
FW	ENG	Tony Leighton
FW	ENG	Kevin Lewis
FW	SCO	Les Massie
FW	ENG	John Rudge
FW	ENG	Derek Stokes

== Results ==
=== Division Two ===
Date	Opponents	Home/ Away	Result F–A	Scorers	Attendance	Position
22 August 1964	Bolton Wanderers	H	1–1	White	12,657	12th
26 August 1964	Plymouth Argyle	A	0–0		17,841	8th
29 August 1964	Middlesbrough	A	0–0		23,152	10th
2 September 1964	Plymouth Argyle	H	1–2	White	9,478	17th
5 September 1964	Newcastle United	H	0–1		8,770	21st
11 September 1964	Northampton Town	A	2–3	O'Grady, Massie	12,984	20th
16 September 1964	Cardiff City	A	1–1	White	9,392	20th
19 September 1964	Southampton	H	0–3		6,969	21st
26 September 1964	Swindon Town	A	1–4	Gilliver	12,764	22nd
29 September 1964	Cardiff City	H	3–1	Lewis, Stokes, McHale	5,640	19th
3 October 1964	Coventry City	A	3–2	Coddington (pen), Lewis, Balderstone	26,994	20th
7 October 1964	Derby County	A	0–2		13,622	21st
10 October 1964	Portsmouth	H	2–1	Massie, Stokes	7,511	18th
17 October 1964	Manchester City	A	3–2	White (2), Gratrix (og)	15,704	17th
24 October 1964	Charlton Athletic	H	0–1		7,480	18th
31 October 1964	Leyton Orient	A	0–1		7,673	20th
7 November 1964	Bury	H	0–2		7,793	21st
14 November 1964	Crystal Palace	A	0–3		14,084	21st
21 November 1964	Norwich City	H	0–0		6,536	21st
28 November 1964	Rotherham United	A	3–2	Massie, O'Grady, Bettany	9,116	21st
5 December 1964	Swansea Town	H	4–0	Holden, McHale (2), Massie	5,533	19th
15 December 1964	Bolton Wanderers	A	0–1		11,782	19th
26 December 1964	Ipswich Town	A	2–3	McHale, Stokes	11,608	21st
28 December 1964	Ipswich Town	H	0–0		10,596	21st
2 January 1965	Newcastle United	A	1–2	Leighton	45,315	21st
16 January 1965	Northampton Town	H	2–0	Balderstone, Massie	7,359	21st
23 January 1965	Southampton	A	3–3	Dinsdale, Leighton (2)	17,473	21st
6 February 1965	Swindon Town	H	2–1	Leighton, Nicholson	9,064	19th
13 February 1965	Coventry City	H	2–1	Massie, McHale	13,042	16th
20 February 1965	Portsmouth	A	0–3		11,435	17th
27 February 1965	Manchester City	H	1–0	Legg	14,405	15th
6 March 1965	Swansea Town	A	2–2	Legg, Leighton	7,574	15th
13 March 1965	Leyton Orient	H	0–0		11,237	15th
19 March 1965	Bury	A	2–0	Leighton, Coddington (pen)	8,106	15th
27 March 1965	Crystal Palace	H	2–0	Massie, O'Grady	10,255	14th
30 March 1965	Middlesbrough	H	1–0	Massie	13,215	12th
3 April 1965	Norwich City	A	2–0	Quigley, Massie	14,465	9th
10 April 1965	Rotherham United	H	1–0	Legg	12,462	9th
17 April 1965	Charlton Athletic	A	0–0		11,962	9th
19 April 1965	Preston North End	H	3–0	Massie, Fraser, Leighton	12,261	9th
20 April 1965	Preston North End	A	0–2		13,256	9th
24 April 1965	Derby County	H	3–1	Leighton, Quigley (2)	10,275	8th

=== FA Cup ===
Date	Round	Opponents	Home/ Away	Result F–A	Scorers	Attendance
9 January 1965	Round 3	Doncaster Rovers	A	1–0	Massie	19,914
30 January 1965	Round 4	Swansea Town	A	0–1		22,614

=== Football League Cup ===
Date	Round	Opponents	Home/ Away	Result F–A	Scorers	Attendance
23 September 1964	Round 2	Leeds United	A	2–3	Lewis, Bell (og)	9,837

== Appearances and goals ==
Name	Nationality	Position	League		FA Cup		League Cup		Total	
Name	Nationality	Position	Apps	Goals	Apps	Goals	Apps	Goals	Apps	Goals
Denis Atkins	England	DF	27	0	2	0	1	0	30	0
Chris Balderstone	England	MF	17	2	1	0	1	0	19	2
John Bettany	England	MF	6	1	1	0	0	0	7	1
Chris Cattlin	England	DF	1	0	0	0	0	0	1	0
John Coddington	England	DF	42	2	2	0	0	0	44	2
Peter Dinsdale	England	DF	25	1	1	0	1	0	27	1
Billy Fraser	Scotland	MF	4	1	0	0	0	0	4	1
Allan Gilliver	England	FW	10	1	2	0	1	0	13	1
Stewart Holden	England	MF	17	1	0	0	1	0	18	1
Ray Holt	England	DF	0	0	0	0	1	0	1	0
Billy Legg	England	DF	7	3	1	0	0	0	8	3
Tony Leighton	England	FW	18	8	0	0	0	0	18	8
Kevin Lewis	England	MF	15	2	0	0	1	1	16	3
Les Massie	Scotland	FW	36	10	2	1	1	0	39	11
Kevin McHale	England	MF	32	5	2	0	0	0	34	5
Bob McNab	England	DF	19	0	0	0	0	0	19	0
Mick Meagan	Republic of Ireland	DF	34	0	2	0	0	0	36	0
Jimmy Nicholson	Northern Ireland	MF	20	1	2	0	0	0	22	1
Michael O'Grady	England	MF	23	3	1	0	0	0	24	3
John Oldfield	Republic of Ireland	GK	12	0	0	0	0	0	12	0
Bob Parker	England	DF	12	0	0	0	1	0	13	0
Derek Parkin	England	DF	1	0	0	0	0	0	1	0
Johnny Quigley	Scotland	MF	15	3	0	0	0	0	15	3
John Rudge	England	MF	2	0	0	0	0	0	2	0
Steve Smith	England	MF	6	0	0	0	0	0	6	0
Derek Stokes	England	FW	12	3	0	0	1	0	13	3
Ken Taylor	England	DF	8	0	1	0	0	0	9	0
Len White	England	FW	11	5	0	0	0	0	11	5
Ray Wood	England	GK	30	0	2	0	1	0	33	0
