= 1963–64 Huddersfield Town A.F.C. season =

Huddersfield Town
1963–64 season
- Chairman: James Chadwick
- Manager: Eddie Boot
- Stadium: Leeds Road
- Football League Second Division: 12th
- FA Cup: Fifth round (eliminated by Burnley)
- Football League Cup: Third round (eliminated by Workington)
- Top goalscorer: League: Derek Stokes (14); All: Derek Stokes (16)
- Highest home attendance: 31,270 vs Leeds United (12 October 1963)
- Lowest home attendance: 5,158 vs Scunthorpe United (25 April 1964)
- Biggest win: 4–0 vs Southampton (3 September 1963)
- Biggest defeat: 2–5 vs Charlton Athletic (14 September 1963); 2–5 vs Manchester City (30 November 1963); 0–3 vs Burnley (15 February 1964); 0–3 vs Rotherham United (28 March 1964)

Huddersfield Town's 1963–64 campaign was mainly a season of nothingness for the Town. They finished 12th in Division 2. Their only main high point of the season was reaching the fifth round of the FA Cup, before losing to Burnley.

== Squad at the start of the season ==
Note: Flags indicate national team as defined under FIFA eligibility rules; some limited exceptions apply. Players may hold more than one non-FIFA nationality.

Pos.	Nation	Player
GK	IRL	John Oldfield
GK	ENG	Ray Wood
DF	ENG	Denis Atkins
DF	ENG	John Coddington
DF	ENG	Stewart Holden
DF	ENG	Ray Holt
DF	ENG	Bob Parker
DF	ENG	Ken Taylor
DF	ENG	Ray Wilson
MF	ENG	John Bettany
MF	IRL	Ollie Conmy

Pos.	Nation	Player
MF	ENG	Peter Dinsdale
MF	SCO	Billy Fraser
MF	ENG	Kevin McHale
MF	ENG	Michael O'Grady
FW	ENG	Chris Balderstone
FW	ENG	Allan Gilliver
FW	SCO	Les Massie
FW	ENG	John Rudge
FW	ENG	Derek Stokes
FW	ENG	Len White

== Review ==
Following the previous season's impressive performances and the acquisition of Kevin Lewis from Liverpool, many thought that Town's chances of promotion back to Division 1 for the first time since 1956. The town mainly won or lost their first 16 league games of the season. The form was inconsistent throughout a large portion of the season. Only during the second half of the season did Town's form start to stabilise, but it improved enough for Town not to be involved in a relegation dogfight to Division 3. They finished in 12th place with 40 points. The main high points of the season came in the FA Cup, when they beat Plymouth Argyle (one of 6 times Town met Argyle during the season), followed by an amazing win at Stamford Bridge over Division 1 Chelsea, before bowing out to Burnley at Turf Moor.

== Squad at the end of the season ==
Note: Flags indicate national team as defined under FIFA eligibility rules; some limited exceptions apply. Players may hold more than one non-FIFA nationality.

Pos.	Nation	Player
GK	IRL	John Oldfield
GK	ENG	Ray Wood
DF	ENG	Denis Atkins
DF	ENG	John Coddington
DF	ENG	Stewart Holden
DF	ENG	Ray Holt
DF	ENG	Bob McNab
DF	ENG	Bob Parker
DF	ENG	Ken Taylor
DF	ENG	Ray Wilson
MF	ENG	John Bettany
MF	IRL	Ollie Conmy

Pos.	Nation	Player
MF	ENG	Peter Dinsdale
MF	SCO	Billy Fraser
MF	ENG	Kevin McHale
MF	ENG	Michael O'Grady
FW	ENG	Chris Balderstone
FW	ENG	Allan Gilliver
FW	ENG	Kevin Lewis
FW	SCO	Les Massie
FW	ENG	John Rudge
FW	ENG	Derek Stokes
FW	ENG	Len White

== Results ==
=== Division Two ===
Date	Opponents	Home/ Away	Result F – A	Scorers	Attendance	Position
24 August 1963	Sunderland	H	0–2		20,894	19th
28 August 1963	Southampton	A	1–1	White	21,456	16th
31 August 1963	Derby County	A	0–2		14,717	18th
3 September 1963	Southampton	H	4–0	Balderstone, McHale, Stokes, White	13,679	14th
7 September 1963	Plymouth Argyle	H	4–3	Stokes (2), Balderstone, White	12,977	13th
10 September 1963	Swansea Town	H	1–0	White	15,846	5th
14 September 1963	Charlton Athletic	A	2–5	White, Stokes	12,511	11th
17 September 1963	Swansea Town	A	2–1	Lewis, O'Grady	10,191	8th
21 September 1963	Grimsby Town	H	1–2	White	14,258	13th
28 September 1963	Preston North End	A	1–2	White	15,840	14th
5 October 1963	Leyton Orient	H	2–1	O'Grady, Coddington (pen)	10,765	15th
8 October 1963	Northampton Town	A	0–1		13,257	15th
12 October 1963	Leeds United	H	0–2		31,270	16th
19 October 1963	Rotherham United	A	1–3	Massie	8,962	18th
26 October 1963	Bury	H	2–1	Wilson, McHale	9,421	14th
2 November 1963	Scunthorpe United	A	0–1		6,074	18th
9 November 1963	Norwich City	H	1–1	Massie	7,923	16th
16 November 1963	Cardiff City	A	1–2	Lewis	14,398	18th
23 November 1963	Swindon Town	H	2–0	White, Massie	7,718	16th
30 November 1963	Manchester City	A	2–5	Lewis (2)	16,192	17th
7 December 1963	Portsmouth	H	1–1	Lewis	8,087	18th
14 December 1963	Sunderland	A	2–3	Lewis, White	27,417	18th
21 December 1963	Derby County	H	0–0		6,094	18th
26 December 1963	Newcastle United	A	0–2		37,898	18th
28 December 1963	Newcastle United	H	3–0	Stokes, Lewis, Balderstone	12,832	17th
11 January 1964	Plymouth Argyle	A	0–0		9,842	17th
18 January 1964	Charlton Athletic	H	0–1	Match abandoned after 52 minutes due to fog	7,341
1 February 1964	Grimsby Town	A	2–2	Gilliver, McHale	7,266	18th
8 February 1964	Preston North End	H	2–2	Gilliver, Stokes	15,792	18th
22 February 1964	Leeds United	A	1–1	Lewis	36,439	18th
24 February 1964	Leyton Orient	A	3–2	Stokes (3)	7,843	15th
29 February 1964	Cardiff City	H	2–1	White (pen), Stokes	10,580	15th
7 March 1964	Bury	A	2–0	White, McHale	6,212	14th
21 March 1964	Norwich City	A	2–2	Fraser, Balderstone	14,458	15th
28 March 1964	Rotherham United	H	0–3		10,363	15th
30 March 1964	Middlesbrough	A	1–1	Stokes	9,871	16th
31 March 1964	Middlesbrough	H	1–0	Lewis	10,964	14th
4 April 1964	Swindon Town	A	2–1	Lewis, Stokes	11,034	12th
7 April 1964	Charlton Athletic	H	2–1	O'Grady, McHale	9,626	11th
11 April 1964	Manchester City	H	0–2		13,520	12th
13 April 1964	Northampton Town	H	0–1		6,762	12th
18 April 1964	Portsmouth	A	1–2	Lewis	11,101	13th
25 April 1964	Scunthorpe United	H	3–2	Stokes (2), Balderstone	5,158	12th

=== FA Cup ===
Date	Round	Opponents	Home/ Away	Result F – A	Scorers	Attendance
4 January 1964	Round 3	Plymouth Argyle	A	1–0	McHale	13,883
25 January 1964	Round 4	Chelsea	A	2–1	McHale 15', White 80'	39,036
15 February 1964	Round 5	Burnley	A	0–3		39,326

=== Football League Cup ===
Date	Round	Opponents	Home/ Away	Result F – A	Scorers	Attendance
25 September 1963	Round 2	Plymouth Argyle	A	2–2	Stokes (2)	7,907
21 October 1963	Round 2 Replay	Plymouth Argyle	H	3–3	Dinsdale, Lewis (pen), White	5,429
28 October 1963	Round 2 2nd Replay	Plymouth Argyle	N	2–1	Massie, McHale	3,000
4 November 1963	Round 3	Workington	A	0–1		9,982

== Appearances and goals ==
Name	Nationality	Position	League		FA Cup		League Cup		Total	
Name	Nationality	Position	Apps	Goals	Apps	Goals	Apps	Goals	Apps	Goals
Denis Atkins	England	DF	41	0	3	0	3	0	47	0
Chris Balderstone	England	MF	37	5	3	0	3	0	43	5
John Bettany	England	MF	18	0	0	0	2	0	20	0
John Coddington	England	DF	27	1	2	0	3	0	32	1
Ollie Conmy	Republic of Ireland	MF	0	0	0	0	1	0	1	0
Peter Dinsdale	England	DF	42	0	3	0	4	1	49	1
Billy Fraser	Scotland	MF	4	1	0	0	0	0	4	1
Allan Gilliver	England	FW	5	2	2	0	1	0	8	2
Stewart Holden	England	MF	9	0	0	0	0	0	9	0
Ray Holt	England	DF	13	0	2	0	1	0	16	0
Kevin Lewis	England	MF	30	11	2	0	4	1	36	12
Les Massie	Scotland	FW	33	3	3	0	3	1	39	4
Kevin McHale	England	MF	31	5	3	2	2	1	36	8
Bob McNab	England	DF	2	0	0	0	2	0	4	0
Michael O'Grady	England	MF	22	3	0	0	3	0	25	3
John Oldfield	Republic of Ireland	GK	3	0	0	0	2	0	5	0
Bob Parker	England	DF	6	0	0	0	0	0	6	0
Derek Stokes	England	FW	36	14	3	0	1	2	40	16
Len White	England	FW	35	11	3	1	4	1	42	13
Ray Wilson	England	DF	29	1	1	0	3	0	33	1
Ray Wood	England	GK	39	0	3	0	2	0	44	0
