= 1959–60 Huddersfield Town A.F.C. season =

1925–26 season of Huddersfield Town

Huddersfield Town
1959–60 season
- Chairman: Stephen Lister
- Manager: Bill Shankly (until 1 December 1959); Eddie Boot (from 19 January 1960)
- Stadium: Leeds Road
- Football League Second Division: 6th
- FA Cup: Fourth round (eliminated by Luton Town)
- Top goalscorer: League: Les Massie (18); All: Les Massie (20)
- Highest home attendance: 30,526 vs West Ham United (9 January 1960)
- Lowest home attendance: 9,336 vs Derby County (14 November 1959)
- Biggest win: 6–1 vs Bristol City (12 December 1959)
- Biggest defeat: 0–4 vs Aston Villa (6 February 1960)

Huddersfield Town's 1959–60 campaign was Town's best season following their relegation from Division 1 4 years earlier. The main points of the season were the resignation of Bill Shankly, who would then lead Liverpool to greatness in his years in charge. Their FA Cup win over West Ham United in the third round replay at Upton Park, which would inadvertently lead to the departure of Denis Law to Manchester City for a record-breaking fee of £55,000.

== Squad at the start of the season ==
Note: Flags indicate national team as defined under FIFA eligibility rules; some limited exceptions apply. Players may hold more than one non-FIFA nationality.

Pos.	Nation	Player
GK	ENG	Harry Fearnley
GK	ENG	Ray Wood
DF	ENG	Terry Caldwell
DF	ENG	John Coddington
DF	ENG	Jack Connor
DF	ENG	Brian Gibson
DF	ENG	Bob Ledger
DF	SCO	Gordon Low
DF	ENG	Bill McGarry
DF	ENG	Bob Parker

Pos.	Nation	Player
DF	ENG	Ken Taylor
DF	ENG	Ray Wilson
MF	ENG	Peter Dinsdale
MF	ENG	Kevin McHale
FW	ENG	Tony France
FW	ENG	Derek Hawksworth
FW	ENG	Stan Howard
FW	SCO	Denis Law
FW	SCO	Les Massie
FW	SCO	Willie Sinclair

== Review ==
Bill Shankly made good progress with Town at the start of the season, leading them to 5 wins in their first 7 league games. A dreadful run of only 1 win in 10 games saw Town slide down the table and then on 1 December, Shankly resigned to take charge of league rivals Liverpool. Shankly's last match in charge of Town was against the Anfield outfit. Ex-Town player Eddie Boot took charge of Town for the rest of the season. He led Town on a charge up the table mainly consisting of alternating wins and losses. However, Town's form led them to a finish of 6th place, their best finish since relegation 4 years earlier.

Another highlight of the season was the win over West Ham United in the FA Cup third round replay at Upton Park with a score of 5 goals to 1. This win showcased the talents of Denis Law, who within 2 months broke the transfer record for a British player after transferring to Manchester City for £55,000.

== Squad at the end of the season ==
Note: Flags indicate national team as defined under FIFA eligibility rules; some limited exceptions apply. Players may hold more than one non-FIFA nationality.

Pos.	Nation	Player
GK	ENG	Harry Fearnley
GK	ENG	Ray Wood
DF	ENG	Denis Atkins
DF	ENG	John Coddington
DF	ENG	Jack Connor
DF	ENG	Brian Gibson
DF	ENG	Bob Ledger
DF	SCO	Gordon Low
DF	ENG	Bill McGarry
DF	ENG	Bob Parker

Pos.	Nation	Player
DF	ENG	Ken Taylor
DF	ENG	Ray Wilson
MF	ENG	Peter Dinsdale
MF	ENG	Kevin McHale
MF	ENG	Michael O'Grady
FW	ENG	Chris Balderstone
FW	ENG	Tony France
FW	ENG	Stan Howard
FW	SCO	Les Massie
FW	SCO	Willie Sinclair

== Results ==
=== Division Two ===
Date	Opponents	Home/ Away	Result F – A	Scorers	Attendance	Position
22 August 1959	Ipswich Town	A	4–1	Ledger, Low, Hawksworth (2)	14,441	1st
26 August 1959	Brighton & Hove Albion	H	2–0	McHale, Dinsdale	15,221	2nd
29 August 1959	Scunthorpe United	H	2–0	Massie (2)	14,370	1st
2 September 1959	Brighton & Hove Albion	A	2–3	Dinsdale, Wilson	22,588	3rd
5 September 1959	Leyton Orient	H	1–1	Dinsdale	15,192	3rd
9 September 1959	Swansea Town	H	4–3	Massie, Ledger (2), Sinclair	12,369	3rd
12 September 1959	Lincoln City	A	2–0	Massie (2)	10,406	2nd
17 September 1959	Swansea Town	A	1–3	Sinclair	15,250	5th
19 September 1959	Aston Villa	H	0–1		22,522	6th
26 September 1959	Sunderland	A	0–0		31,655	7th
3 October 1959	Portsmouth	H	6–3	Connor (2), Massie (2), McHale, Taylor	15,452	4th
10 October 1959	Rotherham United	A	1–1	Law	17,029	4th
17 October 1959	Cardiff City	H	0–1		18,367	6th
24 October 1959	Hull City	A	1–1	Howard	15,864	5th
31 October 1959	Sheffield United	H	0–1		18,466	8th
7 November 1959	Middlesbrough	A	0–1		23,077	11th
14 November 1959	Derby County	H	2–2	France, Coddington (pen)	9,336	10th
21 November 1959	Plymouth Argyle	A	3–1	McHale (2), Law	18,250	6th
28 November 1959	Liverpool	H	1–0	Massie	16,185	5th
5 December 1959	Charlton Athletic	A	1–1	Law	12,333	5th
12 December 1959	Bristol City	H	6–1	Dinsdale, Law, Massie (2), Taylor, Coddington (pen)	10,705	5th
19 December 1959	Ipswich Town	H	3–1	Hawksworth, Massie, Coddington (pen)	10,648	4th
26 December 1959	Stoke City	A	1–1	McHale	20,183	5th
28 December 1959	Stoke City	H	2–3	Massie (2)	25,728	5th
2 January 1960	Scunthorpe United	A	2–0	McHale, Massie	12,228	5th
16 January 1960	Leyton Orient	A	1–2	Connor	11,652	5th
23 January 1960	Lincoln City	H	3–0	McHale, Massie, Gibson	14,995	5th
6 February 1960	Aston Villa	A	0–4		44,879	5th
13 February 1960	Sunderland	H	1–1	Law	9,648	6th
20 February 1960	Portsmouth	A	2–0	Law, Coddington (pen)	14,062	5th
27 February 1960	Rotherham United	H	1–1	Coddington (pen), Law	19,560	5th
5 March 1960	Cardiff City	A	1–2	Balderstone	32,733	7th
12 March 1960	Hull City	H	1–0	Massie	12,167	3rd
19 March 1960	Liverpool	A	2–2	McHale, Balderstone	30,009	6th
26 March 1960	Middlesbrough	H	2–0	McHale, Massie	13,887	3rd
2 April 1960	Derby County	A	2–3	Massie, McHale	13,297	7th
9 April 1960	Plymouth Argyle	H	2–0	McHale, Balderstone	10,660	4th
15 April 1960	Bristol Rovers	A	0–2		16,069	4th
16 April 1960	Bristol City	A	3–2	McHale, Etheridge (og), Massie	17,483	4th
18 April 1960	Bristol Rovers	H	0–1		13,820	4th
23 April 1960	Charlton Athletic	H	4–0	Balderstone, Massie, Connor (2)	10,932	5th
30 April 1960	Sheffield United	A	0–2		16,393	6th

=== FA Cup ===
Date	Round	Opponents	Home/ Away	Result F – A	Scorers	Attendance
9 January 1960	Round 3	West Ham United	H	1–1	Law	30,526
13 January 1960	Round 3 Replay	West Ham United	A	5–1	Massie (2), McGarry, Connor (2)	22,605
30 January 1960	Round 4	Luton Town	H	0–1		28,220

== Appearances and goals ==
Name	Nationality	Position	League		FA Cup		Total	
Name	Nationality	Position	Apps	Goals	Apps	Goals	Apps	Goals
Denis Atkins	England	DF	1	0	0	0	1	0
Chris Balderstone	England	MF	8	4	0	0	8	4
Terry Caldwell	England	DF	4	0	0	0	4	0
John Coddington	England	DF	41	5	3	0	44	5
Jack Connor	England	DF	23	5	2	2	25	7
Peter Dinsdale	England	DF	16	4	1	0	17	4
Harry Fearnley	England	GK	3	0	0	0	3	0
Tony France	England	FW	4	1	0	0	4	1
Brian Gibson	England	DF	36	1	3	0	39	1
Derek Hawksworth	England	MF	22	3	3	0	25	3
Stan Howard	England	MF	9	1	0	0	9	1
Denis Law	Scotland	MF	24	7	3	1	27	8
Bob Ledger	England	MF	24	2	1	0	25	2
Gordon Low	Scotland	DF	19	1	0	0	19	1
Les Massie	Scotland	FW	40	20	3	2	43	22
Bill McGarry	England	DF	35	0	3	1	38	1
Kevin McHale	England	MF	32	14	2	0	34	14
Michael O'Grady	England	MF	1	0	0	0	1	0
Bob Parker	England	DF	2	0	0	0	2	0
Willie Sinclair	Scotland	FW	7	3	0	0	7	3
Ken Taylor	England	DF	31	2	3	0	34	2
Ray Wilson	England	DF	41	1	3	0	44	1
Ray Wood	England	GK	39	0	3	0	42	0
