= John Rudge =

English football player and manager (born 1944)

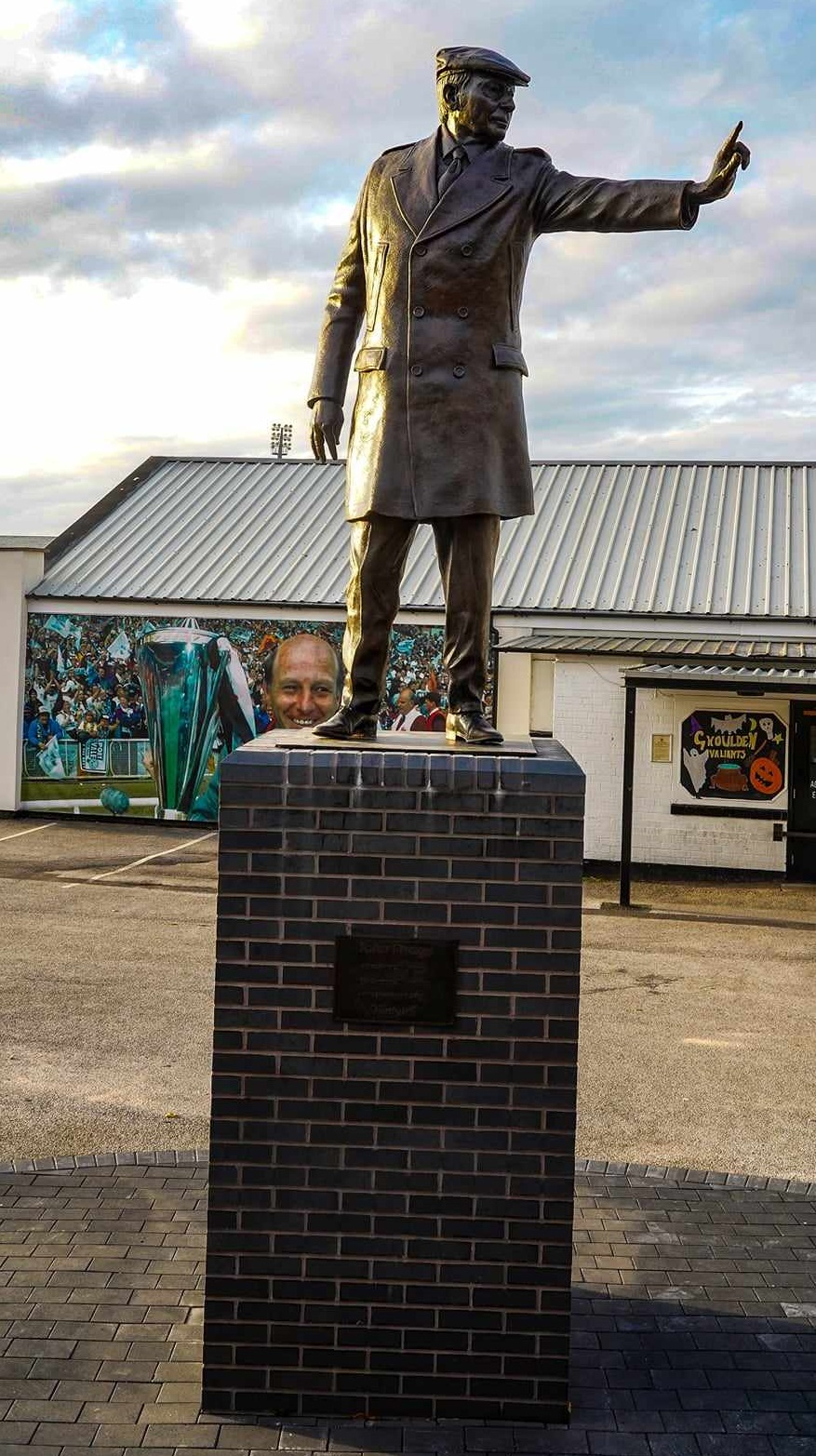
- Statue of John Rudge at Vale Park (2024)

Personal information
- Full name: John Robert Rudge
- Date of birth: 21 October 1944 (age 82)
- Place of birth: Wolverhampton, England
- Height: 5 ft 10 in (1.78 m)
- Position: Forward

Youth career
- 1959–1961: Huddersfield Town

Senior career*
Years	Team	Apps	(Gls)
1961–1966	Huddersfield Town	5	(0)
1966–1969	Carlisle United	50	(16)
1969–1972	Torquay United	96	(34)
1972–1975	Bristol Rovers	70	(17)
1975–1977	AFC Bournemouth	21	(2)
Total		242	(69)

Managerial career
- 1983–1999: Port Vale
- * Club domestic league appearances and goals

John Robert Rudge (born 21 October 1944) is an English former professional football player and manager who is the president of EFL League Two club Port Vale.

Rudge began his playing career at Huddersfield Town in November 1961, but made little impact at the club and was transferred to Carlisle United in December 1966. In January 1969, he joined Torquay United and twice finished as the club's top scorer before he moved on to Bristol Rovers in February 1972. He helped the club to win promotion out of the Third Division in 1973–74 before departing for AFC Bournemouth in March 1975. Injury disrupted his time on the coast, and he retired in 1977. A forward, he scored a total of 78 goals in 267 league and cup appearances in a 16-year career in the English Football League.

He coached at Torquay United and Port Vale before being appointed Port Vale's manager in December 1983. He remained in the role for the next 16 years, easily the longest management spell in the club's history. He masterminded some of the club's most successful campaigns, leading them to promotion in 1985–86, 1989 and 1993–94; he also led them to the Anglo-Italian Cup final in 1996, and victory in the Football League Trophy final in 1993. However, he was sacked in January 1999 and was subsequently appointed director of football at their rivals, Stoke City, a position he held until May 2013. After working as a scout at Hull City, he returned to Port Vale in an advisory role in October 2017. At statue of Rudge was unveiled at Vale Park in October 2024.

== Early and personal life ==
John Robert Rudge was born in Wolverhampton on 21 October 1944 to Marie and Frank Harold Rudge (known as Jack). Marie ran a fruit and vegetable stall at Wolverhampton Market, whilst Jack was a capstan operator at a factory works. Rudge attended St Joseph's secondary modern school and supported Wolverhampton Wanderers (Wolves). His elder sister, Pat, dated and later married Peter Clark, who was Eddie Clamp's understudy at Wolves. In April 1967, Rudge married Dellice, whom he had met whilst he was serving his apprenticeship. They had two daughters, Lisa and Deb. Lisa died in 2026. Rudge released his autobiography, To Cap It All, in 2023, written alongside Potteries football journalist Simon Lowe, with all profits from the book going to the Port Vale Supporters' Club's fundraising efforts for a £100,000 statue in his honour.

== Playing career ==
=== Huddersfield Town ===
Rudge represented Wolverhampton Schoolboys but was declined an apprenticeship at Wolves in 1959. He instead was offered a £7-a-week apprenticeship at Huddersfield Town, having been scouted by Lawrie Kelly, and placed in the boarding house room Denis Law had stayed in until the Scotsman had been sold to Manchester City. Rudge was a right-footed forward who had pace and good heading ability, though was prone to injury. He turned professional at Huddersfield in November 1961. He made his Second Division debut under manager Eddie Boot in the 1962–63 campaign. He made his debut alongside Allan Gilliver in a 4–1 victory over Swansea Town on 6 May 1963. However, Rudge had great difficulty establishing himself in the first team due to the prominent strike partnership of Les Massie and Len White. He did not feature in the 1963–64 season, appeared just twice in 1964–65, and did not get a game in 1965–66. He played two games at the start of the 1966–67 season before manager Tom Johnston allowed him a £4,000 move to Second Division rivals Carlisle United in December 1966, promoting youth team player Frank Worthington in his stead.

=== Carlisle United ===
Working alongside Dick Young, Carlisle manager Alan Ashman built an attacking pass and move side with a one-and-two touch style of play, bargain-hunting for players who could fit into that method. This management philosophy became highly influential for Rudge later in his career. In the meantime, Rudge found regular first-team football at Carlisle and scored seven goals in 14 appearances, including a hat-trick in a 6–1 win over Bolton Wanderers, as the "Cumbrians" finished third in 1966–67, six points short of promotion. One of the goals in the hat-trick was a shot from 35 yards (32 m) that finished off a dribbling move he made to move past two Bolton players.

He went on to form a good partnership with Hughie McIlmoyle, who later had a statue built in his honour outside Brunton Park. Over the course of the 1967–68 campaign he scored nine goals in 29 league and cup games, as Carlisle posted a tenth-place finish under the stewardship of new manager Tim Ward. Carlisle also defeated Newcastle United in the third round of the FA Cup at St James' Park, in what was the first meeting between the two clubs, and Rudge's first experience of a major upset in the competition. He made just four goalless appearances in the first half of the 1968–69 season, being judged as surplus to requirements by new manager Bob Stokoe. During this time Rudge worked on his coaching badges, becoming fully qualified at the age of 25. Stokoe listed Rudge for sale in January 1969 and accepted a bid of £8,000 from Torquay United of the Third Division.

=== Torquay United ===
Rudge scored twice in 14 appearances before the end of the campaign for Allan Brown's "Gulls". He then discovered his form in 1969–70, finishing as the club's top scorer with 16 goals in 35 league and cup matches. He continued to regularly find the net in 1970–71, hitting 21 goals in 43 appearances, as Torquay finished tenth. Torquay also knocked Aston Villa out of the FA Cup in the first round, winning 3–1 at Plainmoor. However, he scored just twice in 12 games in 1971–72, as the club suffered relegation under Jack Edwards. Rudge escaped this fate as he left the club in February 1972, signing a contract with Bill Dodgin's Bristol Rovers. He had been part of a swap deal that saw Robin Stubbs return from Rovers to Torquay.

=== Bristol Rovers ===
Manager Don Megson dubbed Rudge "a second Andy Lochhead", who was the Third Division's top scorer. After three goals in eight games towards the end of the campaign, Rudge hit 12 goals in 29 appearances in the 1972–73 campaign. Rovers also reached the final of the Watney Cup, where they would defeat Sheffield United in a penalty shoot-out at Eastville. However, Rudge missed the final due to injury. He featured as a midfielder in the club's League Cup giant-killing over Manchester United, scoring a header in a 2–1 win at Old Trafford.

Rovers were promoted as runners-up of the Third Division in 1973–74, finishing one point behind champions Oldham Athletic despite having been at the top of the table from 22 September to 27 April; However, Rudge made only 13 starts and six substitute appearances in the league, scoring four goals. By this time, he was mainly utilised in midfield, with Bruce Bannister and Alan Warboys forming a dominant 'Smash and Grab' partnership up front, scoring 40 of the club's 65 goals between them. His injury record also worsened to the extent that Bristol Post reporter Robin Perry wrote that he was the only player to pull on a muscle whilst putting on his tracksuit. He was restricted to just three league starts in the 1974–75 campaign, as well as ten substitute appearances, and moved on to John Benson's AFC Bournemouth in March 1975 for a £7,000 fee.

=== AFC Bournemouth ===
Rudge played seven games for Bournemouth and could not prevent them from being relegated to the Fourth Division at the end of the 1974–75 campaign. He missed most of the 1975–76 season with a ruptured Achilles tendon, scoring twice in 14 appearances. His career ended at age 32 due to his Achilles injury. He operated a fruit and vegetable stall on Christchurch Market to supplement his income.

== Coaching career ==
Following his retirement as a player, Rudge was made a coach at former club Torquay United by Mike Green – a former teammate at both Carlisle and Bristol Rovers. In taking the position he rejected player-manager offers at non-League clubs Weymouth and Atherstone. He enjoyed the role but began to look for opportunities elsewhere after being moved away from the first-team and placed in charge of the School of Excellence. He interviewed at Kettering Town and Crewe Alexandra, though was rejected by Kettering. He felt that Crewe did not have much potential.

In January 1980, Rudge was appointed as a coach at Port Vale, after he was recommended to new manager John McGrath. Vale had long been a struggling lower league club, though McGrath had grand ambitions and wanted to bring in someone with coaching experience who possessed a deep knowledge of the Third and Fourth Divisions. He quickly became a "cushioning buffer" between the players and McGrath, who was "quite dictatorial with a cutting tongue". He would back McGrath in front of the squad whilst addressing the player's concerns to him in private. McGrath could also be an inspirational leader, giving Rudge insights into that aspect of man-management, as well as public relations and headline-grabbing stunts.

Rudge was promoted to the position of assistant manager in December 1980. Vale were promoted out of the Fourth Division at the end of the 1982–83 season and had four players named on the PFA Team of the Year. Rudge and Jimmy Greenhoff took temporary charge of the team for fix games just after Christmas 1982 whilst McGrath was ill with a virus; the team won five of the six games, sustaining Vale's promotion push. Greenhoff was appointed as Rochdale manager in March 1983 and offered Rudge a role at Spotland, which he declined.

=== Manager of Port Vale ===
==== Appointment and becoming established (1983–85) ====
Following the sacking of McGrath in December 1983, Rudge was made caretaker manager at Port Vale. Under McGrath, the club had lost 13 of their opening 17 league games. The club had the third highest budget in the division, a weekly wage bill of three times that of the home gate receipts and were rooted to the foot of the table, nine points from their nearest competitors. Rudge stated that "we cannot change things overnight." However, player Tommy Gore noted "the players are in a more determined mood." Rudge signed left-sided midfielder Kevin Young on loan, and switched Eamonn O'Keefe from midfield to the attack. Rudge lost his first two games in charge, but the team went on to win 21 points from 15 games, and he was given the job permanently on 9 March with a salary of £11,000-a-year. He was unable to prevent relegation at the end of the 1983–84 season, though the club did avoid finishing in last place. Though Mark Bright and Robbie Earle were signed to Vale before Rudge's appointment, he helped to bed them into the first team, making use of the many hours he had previously spent providing them with extra training sessions as a coach. Bright, though, refused to sign a new contract with the club and joined Leicester City for a tribunal set figure of £66,666.

"Vale's reputation has been built on grit and determination and I will be looking to bring in the player who is willing to die for the cause."

— Rudge prepares for his first full season as manager.

The 1984–85 campaign aimed to arrest the decline and consolidate in mid-table. Rudge achieved this aim, slashing the wage bill to offset the club's reduced income, guiding the Vale to a 12th-place finish. He had sold big striker Jim Steel for £10,000 in January 1984 and received a £17,500 fee for Eamonn O'Keefe in March 1985, which gave him money to invest in the playing squad. His first transfer signing was Oshor Williams for £7,000 from Stockport County, who would become a key player after recovering from a cracked kneecap sustained early at the club. Two stand-out free transfer signings were full-back Alan Webb and attacker Alistair Brown; Webb went on to win the Port Vale Player of the Year award in 1985, whilst the veteran Brown proved to be an excellent midfield partner to young Earle.

==== From the Fourth to Second Divisions (1985–91) ====
In summer 1985, Rudge bought experienced centre-half John Williams from Tranmere Rovers for £12,000, whilst young striker Andy Jones was purchased for £3,000 from Rhyl. Williams was sold on for a £18,000 profit within 18 months, whilst Jones would score 53 goals in his first two seasons at Vale Park. An 18-game unbeaten run from January to April helped to secure Vale the fourth promotion place at the end of the 1985–86 season, leaving them seven points clear of fifth-place Leyton Orient. In addition to 18 goals from Jones, the team had a solid defence, and their tally of 19 clean sheets was beaten by only one other club in the entire Football League. At the end of the season, Rudge turned down the opportunity to become manager of Preston North End.

Major signings for the start of the 1986–87 season were goalkeeper Mark Grew and central midfielder Ray Walker, both of whom featured heavily for the club in the coming years, as well as winger Paul Smith. A tribunal set the fee for Walker from Aston Villa at £12,000, much to Villa chairman Doug Ellis's fury. However, the attached 50% sell-on clause dissuaded any motivation to sell him on, meaning that he would end up staying for 11 years and making 424 appearances for the club. Smith was purchased for £10,000 from Sheffield United and was sold for four times that figure to Lincoln City just over a year later. The club finished mid-table, twelve points above the relegation zone, whilst Jones scored 37 goals. The winter signing of veteran Bob Hazell helped to shore up Vale's defence as he formed an excellent partnership with Phil Sproson. At the end of the season, Bill Bell was made the club's chairman, who would have a tempestuous but ultimately successful relationship with Rudge – though Rudge usually had to work hard to persuade Bell to agree to invest in a new signing or even to provide free matchday tickets to club staff, whilst Bell would change the coaching staff on his own volition. Also, Darren Beckford was signed from Manchester City for £15,000, with half of the funds coming from bucket collections from supporters. He would become the club's top scorer for the next four seasons. Rudge also gave a first-team debut to youth academy product Andy Porter, who would make over 400 appearances over the next 12 years; Rudge was so enamoured with Porter that he said "he was the only professional footballer I would have allowed a daughter of mine to marry".

In 1987–88, Vale finished comfortably in mid-table after Rudge switched to a 4–3–3 formation that better suited the players available to him. The cash-flow problem was eased by the sale of Andy Jones to Charlton Athletic for £350,000. Rudge spent £35,000 for Simon Mills from York City, who would be a firm fixture in the first-team for the next five seasons. The Jones money was also invested in midfielder Darren Hughes (£5,000 from Brighton & Hove Albion) and winger Gary Ford (£35,000 from Leicester City). On 20 January 1988, the club achieved a 2–1 victory over top-flight Tottenham Hotspur in the FA Cup which Rudge said "put us on the footballing map". Before the cup run there were rumours that the directors were considering sacking Rudge due to a poor run of results in the league. The cup run and the sale of Jones helped to put the club in the black financially for the first time in a long time, with the £175,000 prize money helping to sustain an overall profit of £410,000.

The 1988–89 season was highly successful. Rudge signed a new two-year contract after Port Vale beat Bristol Rovers in the play-off final following a third-place finish in the league and victory over former boss John MGrath's Preston North End in the semi-finals. For the first time in thirty-two years, Vale were in the Second Division. A new club record was set in January 1989, as Rudge purchased defender Dean Glover from Middlesbrough for £200,000; the signing was a necessary short-term one to maintain the promotion push as both Hazell and Sproson was injured, though Glover would remain with the club for the next ten years. The next month he added Liverpool winger John Jeffers to the squad for £35,000, using the money he received from selling Steve Harper to Preston North End.

To boost the side for the oncoming 1989–90 season, defender Neil Aspin was purchased from Leeds United for £150,000; Aspin would play over 400 games for Vale in the next ten years, mainly alongside Glover at centre-back. Another outlay of £125,000 was spent on striker Nicky Cross, who would play around 150 games over the next five years. Vale fans were not used to such purchases, but compared to other teams in the division, the money spent was quite modest. Now on a par with Potteries derby rivals Stoke City, both league games ended as draws, though Stoke were relegated in last place to leave Vale in a higher division than their rivals for the first time since 1955–56.

He made a few changes in preparation for the 1990–91 campaign, with Kevin Kent as the only major incoming transfer. Vale once again finished comfortably in mid-table. Non-scoring striker Ronnie Jepson was sold to Preston North End for £80,000, which was reinvested in bringing Dutch midfielder Robin van der Laan to the club; over the next five years the Dutchman become a key player. In June 1992, Rudge again broke the club's transfer record, picking up striker Martin Foyle for £375,000 from Oxford United; Foyle went on to score 108 goals in 296 games for the club. Rudge also brought in Keith Houchen from Hibernian for £100,000 and spent £300,000 on the versatile centre-half Peter Swan. The money for these acquisitions came from the sale of Robbie Earle to Wimbledon for £775,000 and Darren Beckford to Norwich City for £925,000.

"We've got to see whether we can reach the top seven, but we cannot afford to get complacent. It could be just as tough."

— Rudge's ambitions in 1991 were much higher than those of eight years previous.

==== Vale as a second-tier mainstay (1991–99) ====
In 1991–92, the club finished in last place, five points shy of safety. Vale were still a Second Division club due to the creation of the Premier League, though they were now in the third tier. Vale had gone 18 games without a win in the campaign's second half after Ray Walker was sidelined for five months with ligament damage, Nico Jalink proving to be an inadequate replacement. Ian Taylor became another excellent signing, the replacement for Earle after he was purchased from non-League Moor Green for £15,000 in May 1992. Another key arrival for the 1992–93 campaign was goalkeeper Paul Musselwhite, signed for a £17,500 fee from Scunthorpe United to take the place of the ageing Mark Grew, with Musselwhite going on to feature in over 360 games over the next eight years. Taylor would finish as top scorer on 19 goals, helping the team to 89 points and a third-place finish. Rudge managed his team at Wembley twice in 1993, winning the Football League Trophy final 2–1 over Stockport County, but losing the play-off final 3–0 to West Bromwich Albion. Vale also played their Potteries derby rivals five times, beating Lou Macari's Stoke in the Football League Trophy clash and the FA Cup tie after a replay, but losing both encounters in the league. Writing in his autobiography, he described the play-off final defeat as the lowest point of his career as the clubs "epic" season ended without the promotion they craved.

In 1993–94 the club gained promotion in second place on 88 points whilst also beating Premier League side Southampton in the FA Cup. This was achieved without star midfielder Ray Walker, who was forced to sit out the entire campaign with a cruciate ligament injury. The hangover of the play-off final had continued up until mid-September, at which point they won eight games out of ten to climb to the top of the table. Six wins from eight league games also won Rudge the Second Division Manager of the Month award for April. At the end of the season, Ian Taylor was sold to Sheffield Wednesday, becoming the club's first million-pound sale. Rudge was also approached to manage Stoke City but declined chairman Peter Coates's offer. Rudge was though very unhappy with Bell for refusing to pay him a promotion bonus that had been verbally agreed, and strongly considered accepting Bradford City chairman Geoffrey Richmond's offer to manage his club with a 25% salary increase until a gathering of hundreds of Vale fans outside the stadium convinced him to stay put.

The club consolidated their First Division status in 1994–95, finishing ten points above the relegation zone. The money from Taylor's sale was reinvested into the playing squad, with £225,000 going to Newcastle United for Steve Guppy, and a £150,000 fee was paid to bring striker Tony Naylor in from nearby Crewe Alexandra. Both men would prove to be good buys, Naylor being a three-time top scorer. At the end of the season, Van der Laan was sold to Derby County for £475,000 plus Lee Mills (Mills would go on to win the club's Player of the Year award in 1998). Of this sum, £450,000 was reinvested in York City midfielder Jon McCarthy and another £50,000 was spent on midfielder Ian Bogie.

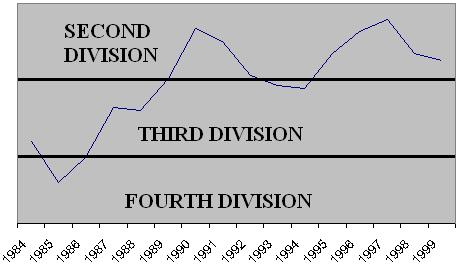
The club rose through the divisions under the management of John Rudge.

In 1995–96, Vale finished 12th in the First Division and beat Stoke City 1–0 in both league encounters thanks to goals from Bogie. The club achieved another giant slaying by beating Everton 2–1 in an FA Cup fourth-round replay. Rudge also led Vale to the final of the Anglo-Italian Cup, where they lost 5–2 to Genoa, Gennaro Ruotolo scoring a hat-trick.

In 1996–97, the club finished in eighth place, their best league finish since 1934. In February, he sold Guppy to Martin O'Neill's Leicester City for £950,000. Gareth Ainsworth was purchased for a club record £500,000 from Lincoln City at the start of the 1997–98 season. This was paid for by the sale of McCarthy to Birmingham City for £1.5 million. Vale finished a disappointing 19th, a mere point away from the drop after winning 4–0 at Huddersfield Town on the final day to ensure that both Manchester City and Stoke City joined Reading in being relegated. Stoke City chairman Peter Coates again offered the vacant manager's position to Rudge, who accepted and signed a contract, only to change his mind and stay at Vale Park.

At the start of the 1998–99 season, Ainsworth was sold to Wimbledon for £2 million, breaking another club transfer record. Ainsworth's sale was authorised by the club's board without Rudge's knowledge or blessing as he was out of the country scouting in Sweden. Mills was also sold to Bradford City for £1 million, with the player unable to leave for free as he had signed a contract extension with the Vale only hours before the bosman ruling came into law. As well as an increased number of big money sales, key players such as Naylor, Foyle, Aspin, Glover and Walker were coming towards the end of their careers, with the latter having already departed for the local non-League scene. Bell and Rudge frequently clashed over the club's spending priorities, with the chairman wanting to improve further the stadium and the manager demanding funds to improve the playing squad. In the summer of 1998, Rudge was permitted to spend £300,000 on forward Peter Beadle and £100,000 on defender Michael Walsh, whilst having to make do with free transfers to make up the rest of his squad.

Bell sacked Rudge on 18 January 1999, two days after a 1–0 home defeat to Swindon Town that left the Vale 23rd in the table. This caused outrage amongst Port Vale fans, who held a "flat cap protest" (Rudge's headwear of choice) to display their disgust at Bell's decision. Rudge had to take the club to an employment tribunal as Bell refused to pay the amount stipulated in his contract. Following the dismissal, Sir Alex Ferguson said: "Every Port Vale supporter should get down on their knees and thank The Lord for John Rudge."

One last signing from the Rudge era was Marcus Bent, who arrived for £300,000 from Crystal Palace just days before Rudge's sacking. However, new manager Brian Horton let Bent go to Sheffield United for £375,000; United would sell Bent to Blackburn Rovers for £2 million just 13 months later. Another star of the late Rudge era was Anthony Gardner. Gardner was retained by Vale and was sold to Spurs for £855,000 in January 2000.

=== Director of football at Stoke City ===
"Nineteen years was a long time. I was sacked and asked to be director of football, but I thought it was the right time for me to leave because I didn't think my relationship then with the board of directors was as good as I would have liked it to have been. It was always an awkward situation and I think the main reason I stayed as long as I did was down to the supporters, because they were fantastic to me. I didn't intend any revenge on Vale by joining their local rivals. It was just the convenience of the area; my family and I are settled here, it was a quick opportunity to get back into football, and it was right for me at the time."

— Rudge explains his reasons for heading to the Britannia Stadium, rather than stay at Vale Park.

Rudge was appointed as director of football at Stoke City in 1999, working alongside manager Gary Megson, after turning down the same role at Port Vale. One of his early signing successes was goalkeeper Ben Foster, who had been scouted by Colin Dobson; Foster was bought from Racing Club Warwick for £15,000 and sold to Manchester United for £1 million four years later. Rudge retained his position after the club were taken over by Gunnar Gíslason's Icelandic consortium because newly appointed manager Guðjón Þórðarson wanted him and coach Nigel Pearson to provide knowledge of the English leagues. Another Rudge signing was future Scotland international striker Chris Iwelumo, as well as the majority of the British signings of the Icelandic era, such as fellow Scotsman Peter Handyside; he also dabbled in the Dutch market, signing Netherlands international Peter Hoekstra, whilst Belarus international Syarhey Shtanyuk arrived from Belgium. Rudge was offered the post of manager at former club Bristol Rovers in February 2001, but declined. Stoke won the 2000 Football League Trophy final and 2002 Second Division play-off final.

Guðjón was sacked despite promotion, and his replacement in Steve Cotterill quit after four months. The board gave Rudge the task of convincing George Burley to take charge, a task in which he failed after Burley changed his mind the day before his scheduled unveiling. Rudge suggested Tony Pulis, and Pulis was given the job instead, who in turn told Rudge which players to sign rather than allow Rudge to take the recruitment lead. However, problems occurred at the boardroom level, leading to one embarrassing moment where Ade Akinbiyi refused to leave Rudge's office all day in protest that a promised contract was not forthcoming; Gíslason refused to sanction Akinbiyi's new contract and the player was eventually sold to Burnley. Gíslason sacked Pulis for not recruiting a sufficient amount of Icelandic players and hired Dutchman Johan Boskamp to take charge.

On 2 November 2005, he had a public fall-out with Boskamp at Highfield Road. Rudge went down to the dug-out during a 2–1 win over Coventry City to give some advice to Boskamp. The Dutchman took offence to this and said to the board, 'Either he goes, or I go', believing that Rudge had overstepped the mark. Rudge maintained, though, that Boskamp used the incident as a ploy in an attempt to be paid off by Stoke as the Dutchman could not handle the pressure of the English game, revealing that he had talked Boskamp out of quitting during the pre-season. Rudge and his assistant Jan de Koning were twice suspended by Stoke, after disagreements with Boskamp. Rudge was reinstated in his role following Boskamp's departure and the return of former chairman Peter Coates and former manager Tony Pulis.

Stoke City's promotion out of the Championship in 2007–08 meant that he would be at a top-flight club for the first time after 49 years in the game. As the club's administrative, coaching and management staff grew in number during the club's time in the Premier League, Rudge's influence on the first-team lessened. He focussed more of his time on recruiting players identified by the manager – often travelling all across the globe. Stoke reached the 2011 FA Cup final and competed in the UEFA Europa League. However, Rudge found himself having to act as a buffer between manager Tony Pulis and chief executive Tony Scholes. Rudge left Stoke City at the end of the 2012–13 season in a 'major shake-up' of the club's scouting network, ending 14 years at the club at the age of 68; Pulis and many of his backroom team also left the club at this time. After leaving Stoke, Rudge then spent the next four years scouting for Hull City.

=== Return to Port Vale ===
On 4 October 2017, he returned to Port Vale in an advisory role to assist his former defender Neil Aspin, who had just been appointed manager. He was appointed as club president on 10 August 2019. He was inducted into the Stoke-on-Trent Sporting Hall of Fame. A statue of Rudge was unveiled at Vale Park for his 80th birthday in October 2024. His was one of four faces painted onto a community mural at Vale Park in December 2025, alongside Roy Sproson, Robbie Earle and Tom Pope.

== Managerial style ==
Rudge had an attacking philosophy based on a one-and-two-touch style and preferred to play a 4–4–2 formation. Though he got his teams to play attractive football, he was meticulous and rather cautious. He thoroughly researched opposition players and informed his players on weaknesses to exploit and strengths to watch out for. He was reluctant to use substitutions unless a player was injured as he believed the first XI he had selected could get the job done over the ninety minutes. He tended not to lose his temper after a bad performance, and instead Robbie Earle said that he had the "ability to make you feel guilty about playing badly".

He had the knack of spotting talented players, signing them cheaply, and then selling them to bigger clubs for a large profit. In addition to being an excellent judge of talent, he had to be a skilled negotiator. He spent most of his free time scouting players, saying that "I would pride myself in knowing almost every player in the Football League down to the colour of his eyes". In all he made a profit for Port Vale of almost £5 million in the transfer market. However, Port Vale's budget meant that he always worked with only a skeleton staff of one first-team coach, one youth team coach and one part-time physiotherapist, meaning that he "would be cast in the role of chief cook and bottle washer, gaffer, chief coach, chief scout, press officer, psychologist, psychiatrist and chief negotiator of all manner of things".

== Career statistics ==
=== Playing statistics ===
Appearances and goals by club, season and competition
Club	Season	League			FA Cup		League Cup		Total	
Club	Season	Division	Apps	Goals	Apps	Goals	Apps	Goals	Apps	Goals
Huddersfield Town	1962–63	Second Division	1	0	0	0	0	0	1	0
Huddersfield Town	1963–64	Second Division	0	0	0	0	0	0	0	0
Huddersfield Town	1964–65	Second Division	2	0	0	0	0	0	2	0
Huddersfield Town	1966–67	Second Division	2	0	0	0	0	0	2	0
Huddersfield Town	Total		5	0	0	0	0	0	5	0
Carlisle United	1966–67	Second Division	14	7	0	0	0	0	14	7
Carlisle United	1967–68	Second Division	32	9	2	0	0	0	34	9
Carlisle United	1968–69	Second Division	4	0	0	0	0	0	4	0
Carlisle United	Total		50	16	2	0	0	0	52	16
Torquay United	1968–69	Third Division	14	2	0	0	0	0	14	2
Torquay United	1969–70	Third Division	31	14	1	1	3	1	35	16
Torquay United	1970–71	Third Division	40	17	4	2	3	1	47	20
Torquay United	1971–72	Third Division	11	1	1	0	2	1	14	2
Torquay United	Total		96	34	6	3	8	3	110	40
Bristol Rovers	1971–72	Third Division	10	3	0	0	0	0	10	3
Bristol Rovers	1972–73	Third Division	28	10	1	0	3	2	32	12
Bristol Rovers	1973–74	Third Division	19	4	1	1	2	0	22	5
Bristol Rovers	1974–75	Second Division	13	0	0	0	2	0	15	0
Bristol Rovers	Total		70	17	2	1	7	2	79	20
AFC Bournemouth	1974–75	Second Division	7	0	0	0	0	0	7	0
AFC Bournemouth	1975–76	Fourth Division	14	2	0	0	0	0	14	2
AFC Bournemouth	Total		21	2	0	0	0	0	21	2
Career total			242	69	10	4	15	5	267	78

=== Managerial statistics ===
Managerial record by team and tenure
Team	From	To	Record				
Team	From	To	G	W	D	L	Win %
Port Vale	5 December 1983	18 January 1999	843	316	237	290	37.49
Total			843	316	237	290	37.49

== Honours ==
=== As a player ===
Bristol Rovers

- Football League Third Division second-place promotion: 1973–74

=== As a manager ===
Port Vale

- Football League Fourth Division fourth-place promotion: 1985–86
- Football League Third Division play-offs: 1989
- Football League Trophy: 1992–93
- Football League Second Division second-place promotion: 1993–94
- Anglo-Italian Cup runner-up: 1996

Individual

- Football League Fourth Division Manager of the Month: February 1985, April 1986
- Football League Third Division Manager of the Month: November 1988
- Football League Second Division Manager of the Month: April 1994
- EFL Awards Contribution to League football: 2021
- Port Vale Hall of Fame: inducted 2026 (inaugural)
