= Laurence Kelly =

Laurence Kelly may refer to:

- Laurence Kelly (politician) (born 1946), Irish politician
- Laurence Kelly (writer) (1933–2025), English writer

== See also ==
- Lawrence Kelly (disambiguation)
- Laurie Kelly (disambiguation)
