= Ray Wilson (English footballer) =

English footballer (1934–2018)

Ray Wilson MBE
Personal information
- Full name: Ramon Wilson
- Date of birth: 17 December 1934
- Place of birth: Shirebrook, Derbyshire, England
- Date of death: 15 May 2018 (aged 83)
- Place of death: Huddersfield, Yorkshire, England
- Height: 5 ft 8 in (1.73 m)
- Position: Left-back

Senior career*
Years	Team	Apps	(Gls)
1952–1964	Huddersfield Town	266	(6)
1964–1969	Everton	116	(0)
1969–1970	Oldham Athletic	25	(0)
1970–1971	Bradford City	2	(0)
Total		409	(6)

International career
1960–1968	England	63	(0)

Managerial career
- 1971: Bradford City (caretaker)
Medal record
Men's football
Representing England
FIFA World Cup
Winner	1966 England
- * Club domestic league appearances and goals

Ramon Wilson (17 December 1934 – 15 May 2018) was an English professional footballer who played as a left-back. He was a member of the England national team that won the 1966 World Cup.

== Club career ==
=== Huddersfield Town ===
Wilson became an apprentice railwayman upon leaving school, but was spotted by a scout playing amateur football at Huddersfield Town. He began a combination of working on the tracks by night and training with Huddersfield by day, before being called up for national service.

Quickly singled out as a strong and nippy left back, with good overlapping skills, Wilson signed professional forms with Huddersfield in 1952 after his two-year army posting, and made his debut against Manchester United in October 1955. Two years later, under manager Bill Shankly, Wilson was Huddersfield's established, first-choice left back. As well as the full England side, he was selected for various representative teams such the Football League and an 'FA XI'.

=== Everton ===
In 1964, Wilson joined Everton, by which time he had already played 30 times for England, and he remains Huddersfield's most-capped England international. However, a torn thigh muscle sustained in training meant that he missed most of his first season at Everton. He went on to win the FA Cup with Everton in 1966. Two years later, he was on the losing side, as Everton were beaten by West Bromwich Albion in the 1968 FA Cup final. Wilson's fortunes declined at Everton following another injury, and he was granted a free transfer in 1969, missing out on Everton's First Division title in 1970.

=== Later career ===
Wilson moved to Oldham Athletic on a free in 1969. In 1970, he moved again to Bradford City. He served as caretaker manager at Bradford from September to November 1971, after the departure of Jimmy Wheeler. He took command for ten games, before being succeeded by Bryan Edwards.

== International career ==
In April 1960, Wilson won his first cap for England in a 1–1 draw with Scotland. Over the next 12 months, he became a fixture in the side. The FA selection committee put him in the squad for the 1962 World Cup in Chile, and Wilson played in all three group games and England's elimination in the quarter finals at the hands of Brazil.

After the World Cup, Wilson kept his England place under new manager Alf Ramsey. With Ramsey successfully snatching sole responsibility for picking the team from the FA came a firm feeling that Wilson was Ramsey's highest-rated left-back. Others, such as Liverpool's Gerry Byrne, were given the odd chance, but Wilson remained Ramsey's first choice.

As hosts of the 1966 World Cup, England did not have to partake in a rigorous qualifying campaign, and Ramsey experimented with other left-backs as he shaped a squad for the tournament. Later the same year, Wilson was playing at Wembley on six more occasions, ever-present as Ramsey's England got through a World Cup group consisting of Uruguay, Mexico and France; a highly volatile quarter-final against a physical Argentina, and a semi-final against the skilful but enigmatic Portuguese, which was Wilson's 50th appearance for his country.

Wilson was the oldest member of the England team in the World Cup final against West Germany. His early headed clearance fell to striker Helmut Haller, who gave the Germans the lead as a result, but after a hat-trick from Geoff Hurst, England ran out 4-2 winners.

Ramsey continued to select Wilson as England progressed through the qualification process for UEFA Euro 1968, ultimately going out in the semi-finals and finishing third overall. Wilson's 63rd and final England cap came in the third-place play-off against the USSR. At the time of his final cap, he held the record for the highest number of appearances for an outfield player without having scored a goal, a record since broken by Gary Neville and Ashley Cole.

A serious knee injury suffered in the summer of 1968, coupled with the emergence of young Leeds United full-back Terry Cooper (who would be as impressive in the 1970 World Cup as Wilson was in 1966, despite England's elimination in the last eight), ended Wilson's England career.

== After retirement from football ==
Wilson after his playing days ended built an undertaker's business in Huddersfield. Wilson retired as an undertaker in 1997 to Halifax. In 2000, he and four of his 1966 teammates – Hunt, George Cohen, Nobby Stiles and Alan Ball – were appointed MBE for services to football after a high-profile campaign conducted by sections of the media, which was surprised that their contribution to England's World Cup win had never been recognised by the British honours system. The other six, plus Ramsey, had already received various honours. In 2008, Wilson was inducted into the English Football Hall of Fame by a select committee of ex-footballers.

He lived in Slaithwaite near Huddersfield with his wife Pat, who was three years his junior. They had two children. Ray and Pat Wilson were interviewed together in the book No More Worlds to Conquer by Chris Wright (2015).

Wilson was diagnosed with Alzheimer's disease in 2004, along with World Cup-winning teammates Martin Peters in 2013 and Nobby Stiles in 2012. It is feared that the disease was brought on by their heading of the heavier footballs used in their playing days.

On 30 July 2016, fifty years to the day since England lifted the World Cup, Wilson's former club Huddersfield Town released its new second-change kit for the 2016–17 season in his honour. It was released with the tag line "Legends Are Rarely Made", and featured a red shirt, in homage to the 1966 World Cup winning kit, and had Wilson's signature in white, just beneath the collar on the back, and below the white badge on the front. Ray's two sons and his wife released a statement alongside the release:

We are very grateful and humbled that Huddersfield Town have chosen to honour our father with this kit. We have spoken to him about it and he is absolutely delighted. Ray often reminisces about his playing days and in particular his enjoyable time at Town and we'd like to thank the club for doing this tribute and it is lovely to know that Ray is so well thought of at Town.

On 15 May 2018, Wilson died in a care home in Huddersfield from Alzheimer's disease after suffering from the condition for 14 years.

== Career statistics ==
=== Club ===
Appearances and goals by club, season and competition
Club	Season	League			FA Cup		League Cup		Europe		Total	
Club	Season	Division	Apps	Goals	Apps	Goals	Apps	Goals	Apps	Goals	Apps	Goals
Huddersfield Town	1955–56	First Division	6	0	0	0	—		—		26	0
Huddersfield Town	1956–57	Second Division	13	0	0	0	—		—		36	0
Huddersfield Town	1957–58	Second Division	31	1	2	0	—		—		51	0
Huddersfield Town	1958–59	Second Division	42	2	1	0	—		—		48	0
Huddersfield Town	1959–60	Second Division	41	1	3	0	—		—		46	0
Huddersfield Town	1960–61	Second Division	32	0	4	0	0	0	—		45	0
Huddersfield Town	1961–62	Second Division	39	0	2	0	1	0	—		53	0
Huddersfield Town	1962–63	Second Division	33	1	0	0	0	0	—		37	0
Huddersfield Town	1963–64	Second Division	29	1	1	0	3	0	—		40	0
Huddersfield Town	Total		266	6	13	0	4	0	0	0	283	6
Everton	1964–65	First Division	17	0	4	0	0	0	2 (Note: Appearances in Inter-Cities Fairs Cup)	0	23	0
Everton	1965–66	First Division	35	0	8	0	0	0	4 (Note: Appearances in Inter-Cities Fairs Cup)	0	47	0
Everton	1966–67	First Division	30	0	6	0	0	0	4 (Note: Appearances in European Cup Winners' Cup)	0	40	0
Everton	1967–68	First Division	28	0	6	0	0	0	—		34	0
Everton	1968–69	First Division	4/2	0	2	0	0/1	0	—		6/3	0
Everton	Total		114/2	0	26	0	0/1	0	10	0	150/3	0
Oldham Athletic	1969–70	Fourth Division	25	0	3	0	1	0	—		29	0
Bradford City	1970–71	Fourth Division	2	0	1	0	0	0	—		3	0
Career total			407/2	6	43	0	5/1	0	10	0	465/3	6

=== International ===
Appearances and goals by national team and year
National team	Year	Apps	Goals
England	1960	4	1
England	1961	3	0
England	1962	10	0
England	1963	5	0
England	1964	7	0
England	1965	9	0
England	1966	15	0
England	1967	4	0
England	1968	5	0
Total		63	0

== Honours ==
Everton

- FA Cup: 1965–66; runner-up: 1967–68

England

- FIFA World Cup: 1966
