= Lawrence Kelly =

Lawrence Kelly may refer to:

- Laurie Kelly Sr. (1883–1955), Australian politician
- Laurie Kelly (politician) (1928–2018), his son, Australian politician
- Lawrence P. Kelly (1913–1999), Wisconsin legislator
- Laurence Kelly (politician) (born 1946), Irish politician
- Laurence Kelly (writer), English writer
- Lawrie Kelly (1911–1979), Scottish footballer

== See also ==
- Laurie Kelly (disambiguation)
