= Nick Taylor (cricketer, born 1963) =

English cricketer (born 1963)

Personal information
- Full name: Nicholas Simon Taylor
- Born: 2 June 1963 (age 63); Holmfirth, Yorkshire, England
- Batting: Right-handed
- Bowling: Right-arm fast-medium

Domestic team information
- Years: Team
- 1982–1983: Yorkshire
- 1984–1985: Surrey
- 1986: Somerset
- 1990: Norfolk

Career statistics
Competition	First-class	List A
Matches	34	25
Runs scored	180	53
Batting average	8.18	6.62
100s/50s	0/0	0/0
Top score	24*	28
Balls bowled	4,600	1,083
Wickets	79	32
Bowling average	35.12	25.81
5 wickets in innings	2	1
10 wickets in match	0	0
Best bowling	7/44	5/51
Catches/stumpings	7/–	6/–
- Source: CricketArchive, 22 December 2015

Nicholas Simon Taylor (2 June 1963) is an English former first-class cricketer. Born at Holmfirth, the son of the Yorkshire County Cricket Club stalwart Ken Taylor, he made his debut as a right arm fast medium bowler, and right-handed tail end batsman, for Yorkshire in 1982. After failing to establish himself in the team he moved first to Surrey for the 1984 and 1985 seasons, before ending his career at Somerset in 1986. He reappeared for Norfolk in List A cricket in 1990.

In 34 first-class games, Taylor took 79 wickets at 35.12, with a best of 7 for 44 for Surrey against Cambridge University, one of two occasions when he took five wickets in an innings. He also scored 180 runs at 8.18, with a top score of 24 not out.
