= Dennis John (footballer) =

Welsh footballer

Personal information
- Full name: Dennis John
- Date of birth: 27 January 1935
- Place of birth: Swansea, Wales
- Date of death: 12 April 2013 (aged 78)
- Place of death: Cardiff
- Height: 5 ft 10 in (1.78 m)
- Position: Defender

Senior career*
Years	Team	Apps	(Gls)
1955–1957	Plymouth Argyle	3	(0)
1958–1959	Swansea Town	4	(0)
1959–1962	Scunthorpe United	88	(0)
1962–1966	Millwall	106	(6)
- * Club domestic league appearances and goals

Dennis John (27 January 1935 – 12 April 2013) was a Welsh professional footballer who played for Plymouth Argyle, Swansea Town, Scunthorpe United and Millwall.

John was part of the Millwall squad that went unbeaten in 59 consecutive league matches at home, a record at the time, from 24 August 1964 until 14 January 1967.

Dennis John is also the father of Welsh Rugby Union player WillGriff John.
