= Laurie Kelly =

Laurie Kelly may refer to:

- Laurie Kelly (footballer) (1925–1972), English former footballer
- Laurie Kelly Sr. (1883–1955), Australian politician
- Laurie Kelly (politician) (1928–2018), Australian politician

== See also ==
- Lawrence Kelly (disambiguation)
