= Terry Caldwell =

English footballer

Personal information
- Full name: Terence Caldwell
- Date of birth: 5 December 1938 (age 87)
- Place of birth: Wakefield, England
- Position: Defender

Youth career
- Huddersfield Town

Senior career*
| Years | Team | Apps | (Gls) |
| 1959–1960 | Huddersfield Town | 4 | (0) |
| 1960–1961 | Leeds United | 20 | (0) |
| 1961–1970 | Carlisle United | 344 | (1) |
| 1970–1972 | Barrow | 30 | (0) |
| 1972–19?? | Wakefield | | |
- * Club domestic league appearances and goals

Terence Caldwell (born 5 December 1938) is an English former professional footballer who made nearly 400 appearances in the Football League playing as a defender for Huddersfield Town, Leeds United, Carlisle United and Barrow.
