= Willie Sinclair =

Scottish footballer (1934–2023)

Personal information
- Full name: William Mearns Sinclair
- Date of birth: 14 October 1934
- Place of birth: Coatbridge, Scotland
- Date of death: 2023 (aged 89)
- Place of death: Dunfermline, Scotland
- Position: Right winger

Senior career*
Years	Team	Apps	(Gls)
1950–1953	Aberdeen	0	(0)
1953–1959	Falkirk	88	(21)
1959–1960	Huddersfield Town	15	(5)
1960	Tranmere Rovers	4	(0)
1961	Halifax Town	21	(3)
1961–1962	Stirling Albion	18	(3)
- * Club domestic league appearances and goals

William Mearns Sinclair (14 October 1934 – 2023) was a Scottish professional footballer who played as a midfielder for Aberdeen, Falkirk, Huddersfield Town, Tranmere Rovers, Halifax Town and Stirling Albion.

In the early 1960s, Sinclair moved to Australia where he played for Adelaide Polonia and APIA. He later returned to Scotland, and lived in Fife, where he died in 2023, at the age of 89.
