= Terry Kelly (English footballer) =

English footballer

Personal information
- Full name: Terence William John Kelly
- Date of birth: 16 January 1932
- Place of birth: Luton, England
- Date of death: 2 August 2007 (aged 75)
- Place of death: Luton, England
- Position: Defender

Senior career*
Years	Team	Apps	(Gls)
1950–1963	Luton Town	136	(1)
- * Club domestic league appearances and goals

Terence William John Kelly (16 January 1932 – 2 August 2007) was an English professional footballer, who played for Vauxhall Motors, Luton Town, Dunstable Town and Cambridge City. He played 150 games for the Hatters between 1950 and 1963, scoring once.
