= Ken Turner (English footballer) =

English footballer

Personal information
- Full name: Kenneth Turner
- Date of birth: 22 April 1941 (age 85)
- Place of birth: Great Houghton, England
- Position: Full back

Senior career*
Years	Team	Apps	(Gls)
1958–1963	Huddersfield Town	5	(0)
1963–1966	Shrewsbury Town	64	(1)
1966–1967	York City	88	(2)
1968–1969	Sligo Rovers		
- * Club domestic league appearances and goals

Kenneth Turner (born 22 April 1941) is an English former footballer.

He signed for Sligo Rovers in August 1968.
