= Jim Kerray =

Scottish footballer (1935–2021)

Personal information
- Full name: James Rillay Kerray
- Date of birth: 2 December 1935
- Place of birth: Stirling, Scotland
- Date of death: 6 November 2021 (aged 85)
- Place of death: Larbert, Scotland
- Position: Striker

Senior career*
Years	Team	Apps	(Gls)
1957–1960	Raith Rovers	76	(28)
1960	Dunfermline Athletic	11	(4)
1960–1961	Huddersfield Town	54	(12)
1961–1962	Newcastle United	38	(10)
1962–1964	Dunfermline Athletic	44	(18)
1964–1966	St Johnstone	47	(18)
1966–1968	Stirling Albion	54	(9)
1968–1969	Falkirk	15	(1)
Total		339	(100)
- * Club domestic league appearances and goals

James Rillay Kerray (2 December 1935 – 6 November 2021) was a Scottish professional footballer who played during the 1950s and 1960s for clubs in England and Scotland.
