= John Oldfield (footballer) =

English footballer

Personal information
- Full name: John Stephen Oldfield
- Date of birth: 19 August 1943
- Place of birth: Lindrick, England
- Date of death: October 2002 (aged 59)
- Place of death: Leeds, England
- Position: Goalkeeper

Senior career*
| Years | Team | Apps | (Gls) |
| 1963–1969 | Huddersfield Town | 152 | (0) |
| 1969–1971 | Wolverhampton Wanderers | 19 | (0) |
| 1971 | → Crewe Alexandra (loan) | 5 | (0) |
| 1971–1973 | Bradford City | 31 | (0) |
- * Club domestic league appearances and goals

John Stephen Oldfield (born 19 August 1943) is a former professional footballer, who played for Huddersfield Town, Wolverhampton Wanderers, Crewe Alexandra and Bradford City.

John Oldfield was a keeper who set a record by saving penalties in successive games against Arsenal and Liverpool more than 40 years ago.
