= Lawrie Kelly =

Scottish footballer

Personal information
- Full name: Lawrence Kelly
- Date of birth: 19 November 1911
- Place of birth: Bellshill, Scotland
- Date of death: 1979 (aged 67–68)
- Height: 5 ft 8 1/2 in (1.74 m)
- Position: Full back

Senior career*
Years	Team	Apps	(Gls)
–1934	St Anthony's		
1934–1936	Southend United	20	(0)
1937	Bristol City	1	(0)
1937–1944	Aldershot	40	(0)
- * Club domestic league appearances and goals

Lawrence Kelly (19 November 1911 – 1979) was a Scottish professional footballer who played in the Football League for Aldershot, Southend United, Bristol City as a full back.
