= Billy Fraser =

Scottish footballer

Personal information
- Full name: William Thomas Fraser
- Date of birth: 12 August 1945 (age 81)
- Place of birth: Edinburgh, Scotland
- Height: 5 ft 6 in (1.68 m)
- Position: Outside left

Youth career
- Huddersfield Town

Senior career*
Years	Team	Apps	(Gls)
1963–1965	Huddersfield Town	8	(2)
1965–1966	Heart of Midlothian	1	(1)
1967	Washington Whips	0	(0)
1968	Boston Beacons	32	(5)
1970–1971	Washington Darts	46	(5)
1972	Miami Gatos	14	(1)
- * Club domestic league appearances and goals

William Thomas Fraser (born 12 August 1945) is a Scottish former professional footballer who played as an outside left for Huddersfield Town in the English Football League and for Heart of Midlothian in the Scottish Football League. He then moved to the United States, where he played in the North American Soccer League for the Boston Beacons, the Washington Darts and the Miami Gatos. Fraser was selected to the 1970 NASL All-star First team, and as an All-star Honorable mention in 1971 and 1972.
