= John McCann (footballer, born 1934) =

Scottish footballer

Personal information
- Full name: John McCann
- Date of birth: 27 July 1934
- Place of birth: Glasgow, Scotland
- Date of death: May 2020
- Place of death: Barnsley
- Position: Left winger

Senior career*
Years	Team	Apps	(Gls)
1955–1959	Barnsley	118	(17)
1959–1960	Bristol City	30	(0)
1960–1962	Huddersfield Town	20	(1)
1962–1964	Derby County	55	(2)
1964	Darlington	4	(0)
1964–1966	Chesterfield	41	(9)

International career
1957	Scotland B	1	(0)
- * Club domestic league appearances and goals

John McCann (born 27 July 1934 in Glasgow, Scotland) was a professional footballer who played as a winger for six English clubs during the 1950s and 1960s.
