= John Milner (footballer) =

English footballer

Personal information
- Date of birth: 14 May 1942 (age 84)
- Place of birth: Huddersfield, England
- Position: Wing half

Youth career
- Huddersfield Town

Senior career*
Years	Team	Apps	(Gls)
1960–1963	Huddersfield Town	17	(0)
1963–1966	Lincoln City	109	(6)
1966–1967	Bradford Park Avenue	8	(0)
1968	Boston Beacons	31	(2)
1974	Denver Dynamos	1	(0)
- * Club domestic league appearances and goals

John Milner (born 14 May 1942 in Huddersfield) is an English former professional footballer who played in the Football League as a wing half for Huddersfield Town, Lincoln City and Bradford Park Avenue during the 1960s.

He also played in the North American Soccer League for the Boston Beacons and the Denver Dynamos.
