= Bob Ledger =

English footballer

Personal information
- Full name: Robert Hardy Ledger
- Date of birth: 5 October 1937
- Place of birth: Chester-le-Street, England
- Date of death: 14 September 2015 (aged 77)
- Place of death: Doncaster, England
- Position: Midfielder

Senior career*
Years	Team	Apps	(Gls)
1955–1962	Huddersfield Town	58	(7)
1962–1968	Oldham Athletic	222	(37)
1968–1969	Mansfield Town	57	(14)
1969–1970	Barrow	22	(2)
Total		359	(60)
- * Club domestic league appearances and goals

Robert Hardy Ledger (5 October 1937 – 14 September 2015) was an English professional footballer born in Chester-le-Street, County Durham. He played as a midfielder during the 1950s, 1960s and 1970s. He was defense, midfield and forward for Oldham Athletic and went in goals when goalkeeper Dave Best was injured.

Ledger died on 14 September 2015 at his home in Doncaster, following a short illness. He was 77.
