= Allan Gilliver =

English footballer (1944–2025)

Personal information
- Date of birth: 3 August 1944
- Place of birth: Swallownest, Rotherham, England
- Date of death: 23 December 2025 (aged 81)
- Position: Forward

Senior career*
Years	Team	Apps	(Gls)
1962–1966	Huddersfield Town	45	(22)
1966–1968	Blackburn Rovers	34	(9)
1968–1969	Rotherham United	27	(2)
1969–1970	Brighton & Hove Albion	57	(19)
1970–1972	Lincoln City	37	(8)
1972–1974	Bradford City	70	(30)
1974–1975	Stockport County	25	(5)
1975	Baltimore Comets	5	(0)
1975–1976	Boston United	13	(3)
1976–1978	Gainsborough Trinity		
1978–1979	Bradford City	2	(0)
Total		315+	(98+)
- * Club domestic league appearances and goals

Allan Henry Gilliver (3 August 1944 – 23 December 2025) was an English professional footballer who played as a forward. He made nearly 300 appearances and scored nearly 100 goals in the Football League during the 1960s and 1970s. He also appeared in the North American Soccer League for the Baltimore Comets. He was also a local cricketer.

== Football career ==
Gilliver started his career with Huddersfield Town in 1961 after being spotted by a talent scout, and went on to play for several English clubs including Bradford City who he signed for in 1972 and again in 1978. After his playing career ended his connection with Bradford City continued through a number of roles including groundsman, safety officer and commercial manager. A testimonial match was held for him at Valley Parade in 1998 and he retired in 2007.

== Cricket career ==
Gilliver also played local cricket in Bradford, spending eight years with Brighouse from 1975, scoring a total of 5,063 runs, later playing for Liversedge, Manningham Mills, Cleckheaton, Windhill, Lidget Green and Undercliffe

== Personal life and death ==
His dementia diagnosis in the early 2010s was thought to be connected with a career of heading the football and led to the setting up of Bradford Memory Walks which take place in aid of the Alzheimer's Society.

Gilliver died on 23 December 2025 at the age of 81.
