= Ray Holt (footballer) =

English footballer

Personal information
- Date of birth: 29 October 1939
- Place of birth: Thorne, Doncaster, England
- Date of death: 7 December 2024 (aged 85)
- Position: Defender

Senior career*
Years	Team	Apps	(Gls)
1961–1965	Huddersfield Town	16	(0)
1965–1966	Oldham Athletic	15	(0)
1966–1968	Halifax Town	86	(0)
1968–1970	Scunthorpe United	50	(0)
- * Club domestic league appearances and goals

Raymond Holt (29 October 1939 – 7 December 2024) was an English professional footballer who played as a defender for Huddersfield Town, Oldham Athletic, Halifax Town and Scunthorpe United in the Football League.
