= Harry Fearnley (footballer, born 1935) =

English footballer

Personal information
- Full name: Henry Fearnley
- Date of birth: 16 June 1935
- Place of birth: Penistone, Barnsley, England
- Date of death: 12 January 2013 (aged 77)
- Place of death: Poole, Dorset, England
- Position: Goalkeeper

Youth career
- ????–1951: Penistone Church

Senior career*
Years	Team	Apps	(Gls)
1952–1963	Huddersfield Town	90	(0)
1963–1965	Oxford United	90	(0)
1965–1967	Doncaster Rovers	32	(0)
- * Club domestic league appearances and goals

Henry "Harry" Fearnley (16 June 1935 – 12 January 2013) was a professional footballer born in Penistone, near Barnsley, Yorkshire, who played as a goalkeeper for Huddersfield Town, Oxford United and Doncaster Rovers.

In the 1965−66 season, Fearnely won a 4th Division Champions medal with Rovers.

He died on 12 January 2013, at his home in Poole, Dorset, aged 77.
