= Ollie Conmy =

Irish footballer (1939–2014)

Personal information
- Full name: Oliver Martin Conmy
- Date of birth: 13 November 1939
- Place of birth: Mulrany, County Mayo, Ireland
- Date of death: 26 January 2014 (aged 74)
- Place of death: Southport, Merseyside, England
- Position: Midfielder

Senior career*
Years	Team	Apps	(Gls)
1960–1963	Huddersfield Town	3	(0)
1964–1972	Peterborough United	263	(34)
1972–1974	Cambridge City		

International career
1965–1969	Republic of Ireland	5	(0)
- * Club domestic league appearances and goals

Oliver Martin Conmy (13 November 1939 – 26 January 2014) was a former footballer who played as a winger in the 1960s and 1970s.

Although born in Ireland, he was just nine years old when his parents left County Mayo to live in Dewsbury, Yorkshire, where he was spotted by Huddersfield Town playing for St Paulinus Youth Club.

He played in The Football League for Huddersfield Town and Peterborough United, making over 250 league appearances with Peterborough, and he later played for Cambridge City.

Conmy was capped five times in total for the Republic of Ireland national football team at senior level.

He died aged 74 on 26 January 2014 at his Southport home, following a long illness.
