= Derek Stokes =

English footballer (1939–2022)

Personal information
- Full name: Derek Stokes
- Date of birth: 13 September 1939
- Place of birth: Normanton, England
- Date of death: 24 May 2022 (aged 82)
- Place of death: Bradford, England
- Height: 5 ft 9 in (1.75 m)
- Position: Striker

Youth career
- Bolton Wanderers
- Snydale Road Athletic
- 1956–1957: Bradford City

Senior career*
Years	Team	Apps	(Gls)
1957–1960	Bradford City	94	(44)
1960–1966	Huddersfield Town	153	(65)
1966–1967	Bradford City	32	(11)
1966–1970	Dundalk	62	(29)
1970	Drogheda United		
Total		331	(149)

International career
1962–1963	England U23s	4	(2)
- * Club domestic league appearances and goals

Derek Stokes (13 September 1939 – 24 May 2022) was an English professional footballer who played for Bradford City and Huddersfield Town during the 1950s and 1960s, as a striker.

== Early life ==
Born in Snydale near Normanton, Stokes was the youngest of 11 children, 10 boys and 1 girl.

== Career ==
Stokes began his career with Bolton Wanderers and Snydale Road Athletic, before moving from Snydale to Bradford City in May 1956. He had two spells with the club which saw him score 55 goals in 126 league games. He scored in 8 consecutive matches between 26 December 1959 and 6 February 1960, scoring a total of 14 goals; the record was later matched by Nahki Wells.

His time at Bradford City was split by a spell with Huddersfield Town. In total, he scored 120 goals in 279 Football League appearances for the two clubs. He scored on both of his debuts for Bradford City and on his debut for Huddersfield.

He later played in Ireland with Dundalk, scoring 58 goals in 122 goals in all competitions for the club, before finishing his career with Drogheda United.

He also played for England under-23s.

== Later life and death ==
After retiring in 1970, Stokes worked as a golf steward and publican. Following his retirement, Stokes moved down to Charmouth in Dorset in 2004 before returning to Bradford in 2016. Stokes was diagnosed with Alzheimer's disease in 2018 and died from complications from the disease on the evening of 24 May 2022 at the age of 82.

His funeral was held on 14 July and was attended by friends, family and former teammates.
