= Stewart Holden (footballer) =

English footballer (1942–2004)

Personal information
- Full name: James Stewart Holden
- Date of birth: 21 April 1942
- Place of birth: Grange Moor, Huddersfield, England
- Date of death: 2004 (aged 61–62)
- Position: Defender

Senior career*
| Years | Team | Apps | (Gls) |
| 1960–1965 | Huddersfield Town | 28 | (2) |
| 1965–1966 | Oldham Athletic | 42 | (5) |
| 1966–1967 | Rochdale | 21 | (0) |
| 1967–1968 | Wigan Athletic | 6 | (1) |
- * Club domestic league appearances and goals as of 19 August 2007

James Stewart Holden (21 April 1942 in Grange Moor, Huddersfield – 2004) was a professional footballer who played for Huddersfield Town, Oldham Athletic, Rochdale and Wigan Athletic.

Holden appeared in 6 Cheshire League games for Wigan.
