= Len White =

English footballer

Personal information
- Full name: Leonard Roy White
- Date of birth: 23 March 1930
- Place of birth: Skellow, England
- Date of death: 17 June 1994 (aged 64)
- Place of death: Huddersfield, England
- Position: Centre forward

Youth career
- Upton Colliery

Senior career*
Years	Team	Apps	(Gls)
1950–1952	Rotherham United	43	(15)
1953–1962	Newcastle United	269	(153)
1962–1964	Huddersfield Town	102	(37)
1964–1966	Stockport County	53	(24)
Total		467	(229)
- * Club domestic league appearances and goals

Leonard Roy White (23 March 1930 – 17 June 1994) was an English professional footballer who played as a centre forward. He is most notable for his time at Newcastle United, where he is the club's all-time third highest goalscorer.

== Biography ==
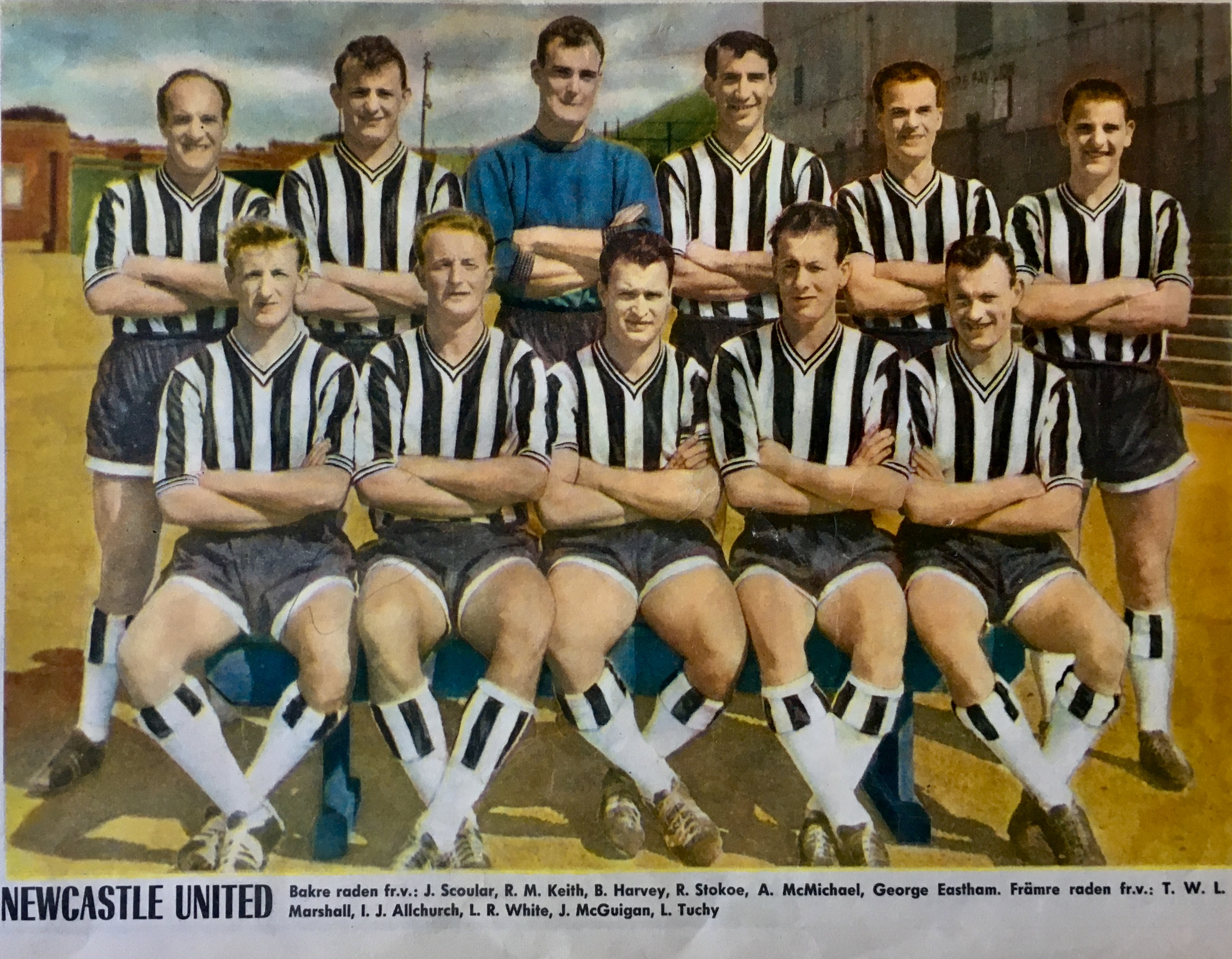
Newcastle United in 1960 – from left, standing: Jimmy Scoular, Dick Keith, Bryan Harvey (goalkeeper), Bob Stokoe, Alf McMichael and George Eastham; sitting: Terry Marshall, Ivor Allchurch, Len White, John McGuigan and Liam Tuohy.

Born in Skellow, West Riding of Yorkshire, a small village near Doncaster, White started his career at Upton Colliery, before moving to Rotherham United and progressing through the Millers' youth and reserve teams. Although originally a centre forward, he developed his skills as a winger too. It was in the latter position that he made his league debut, scoring in a 5–0 victory over Wrexham in August 1950. He scored six goals in his first six first-team games. With winger Jack Grainger already established in the Millers' team, White's appearances were limited, but in 1952, an injury to centre forward Jack Shaw led to Grainger being switched to the central striker role, and White again playing as a winger. He was in great form and was selected for the FA national team in fixtures against the Army and the RAF. Those FA representative games brought him to the attention of the First Division clubs and he joined Newcastle United in 1953 for £12,500 – a relatively high amount at the time. The signing of White came following two recent FA Cup successes for Newcastle.

At Newcastle, White was primarily partnered up front alongside the well-established Jackie Milburn during the 1950s. Because of this, White often found himself in the shadows. Despite that, he had an impressive goalscoring tally and was instrumental during Newcastle's FA Cup-winning campaign of 1955. Once Milburn ended his career in the late 1950s, White took over as the leading striker, and continued to improve his ratio of goals. White is the club's all-time third highest goalscorer with 153 goals, behind Milburn with 200 goals and Alan Shearer with 206 goals.

White eventually left the club for Huddersfield Town in 1962, and finished his career with Stockport County in 1966.

== Personal life ==
White was married to his wife Joyce until his death in Huddersfield in June 1994.

White's brother Jack White was also a professional footballer playing centre half for Aldershot and Bristol City before managing non league Cambridge City and Wellington Town.

== Honours ==
Newcastle United

- FA Cup: 1954–55
