= John Bettany =

English footballer (1937–2019)

Personal information
- Full name: John William Bettany
- Date of birth: 16 December 1937
- Place of birth: Laughton Common, West Riding of Yorkshire, England
- Date of death: 24 October 2019 (aged 81)
- Position: Wing half

Senior career*
Years	Team	Apps	(Gls)
- Thurcroft
1960–1965	Huddersfield Town	59	(6)
1965–1970	Barnsley	198	(25)
1970–1971	Rotherham United	16	(1)
- Goole Town
- * Club domestic league appearances and goals

John William Bettany (16 December 1937 – 24 October 2019) was an English professional footballer who played in the Football League as a wing half for Huddersfield Town, Barnsley and Rotherham United in the 1960s and 1970s.
