= Mike O'Grady =

English footballer

Personal information
- Date of birth: 11 October 1942 (age 84)
- Place of birth: Leeds, England
- Position: Midfielder

Senior career*
Years	Team	Apps	(Gls)
1959–1965	Huddersfield Town	160	(26)
1965–1969	Leeds United	91	(12)
1969–1973	Wolverhampton Wanderers	33	(5)
1971	→ Birmingham City (loan)	3	(0)
1973–1974	Rotherham United	24	(2)
1974–1975	Cork Hibernians	1	(0)
Total		312	(45)

International career
1962–1969	England	2	(3)
- * Club domestic league appearances and goals

Michael O'Grady (born 11 October 1942) is an English former professional footballer from Leeds. He played two games for the England national team, scoring three goals. He also played club football in the Football League for Huddersfield Town, Leeds United, Wolverhampton Wanderers, Birmingham City and Rotherham United, and made one appearance in November 1974 for Cork Hibernians.

During his time at Leeds he played in the second leg of the 1968 Inter-Cities Fairs Cup Final as they defeated Ferencváros on aggregate, and also made 38 appearances (and scored 8 goals) as they won the First Division in 1968–69.

After retiring from play due to the effects of injuries, O'Grady went to work for Yorkshire Television. In his later years he managed a public house near Leeds.

O'Grady is the grandson of Walter Tranter.
