= Peter Dinsdale =

English footballer and manager

Personal information
- Date of birth: 19 October 1938
- Place of birth: Bradford, England
- Date of death: 5 June 2004 (aged 65)
- Place of death: British Columbia, Canada
- Position: Defender

Youth career
- –1956: Yorkshire Amateurs
- 1956–1959: Huddersfield Town

Senior career*
Years	Team	Apps	(Gls)
1959–1967	Huddersfield Town	214	(8)
1967–1968	Vancouver Royals		
1968	→ Bradford Park Avenue (loan)	9	(0)

Managerial career
- 1968–1970: Canada
- 1970–1972: Brighton and Hove Albion (assistant)
- * Club domestic league appearances and goals

Peter Dinsdale (19 October 1938 – 5 June 2004) was a football player and coach. He played 239 times for Huddersfield Town and was head coach of the Canadian national soccer team for qualifying for the 1970 FIFA World Cup.

== Player ==
Born in Bradford, Dinsdale played for the Yorkshire Amateurs before turning professional with Huddersfield Town in January 1956. He cracked the first team in 1959 upon finishing his National Service. A forward early in his career, he made a switch left midfielder by 1962. He played with Town until 1966, making 219 league appearances for the side. Dinsdale was one of the first English players to play professionally in North America, joining the Vancouver Royals of the United Soccer Association (USA) for their inaugural 1967 (summer) season. The USA merged with the National Professional Soccer League (NPSL) to form the North American Soccer League (NASL). Dinsdale played with the Royals during the 1968 NASL season. There he was subject to one of the earliest football loan transfers, playing on loan from Vancouver with Bradford Park Avenue during the Canadian club's off-season. He made nine league appearances for the Bradford club.

== Manager ==
After managing Canada between 1968 and 1970, Dinsdale returned to England to become assistant manager of Brighton and Hove Albion from 1970 to 1972 under former Huddersfield teammate Pat Saward. He later emigrated and settled in Vancouver, working as a real estate agent.
