= Bob Parker (footballer) =

English footballer

Personal information
- Full name: Robert William Parker
- Date of birth: 26 November 1935 (age 90)
- Place of birth: Seaham, County Durham, England
- Position: Defender

Senior career*
| Years | Team | Apps | (Gls) |
| 1959–1965 | Huddersfield Town | 65 | (0) |
| 1965–1969 | Barnsley | 108 | (0) |
| Total | | 173 | (0) |
- * Club domestic league appearances and goals

Robert William Parker (born 26 November 1935) is an English former professional footballer, who played for Huddersfield Town and Barnsley.
