= Kevin McHale (footballer) =

English footballer

Personal information
- Full name: John Kevin McHale
- Date of birth: 1 October 1939 (age 87)
- Place of birth: Darfield, West Riding of Yorkshire, England
- Position: Outside right

Youth career
- 1955–1956: Huddersfield Town

Senior career*
| Years | Team | Apps | (Gls) |
| 1956–1967 | Huddersfield Town | 345 | (60) |
| 1967–1970 | Crewe Alexandra | 116 | (22) |
| 1970–1972 | Chester | 64 | (4) |
| 1972 | Hastings United | ? | (?) |

Managerial career
- 1972: Hastings United
- Emley A.F.C. (1903)
- * Club domestic league appearances and goals as of 10:26, 27 October 2008 (UTC)

John Kevin McHale (born 1 October 1939) was an English professional footballer who played as a striker for Huddersfield Town, Crewe Alexandra, Chester and Hastings United.

== Huddersfield Town Days ==
Over eleven seasons, he became one of Huddersfield's most consistent and familiar post-war players as Town began adjusting to life in the Second Division during the 1950s and 60s.

Born in 1939, McHale began his career playing for Barnsley and England Schools, before joining First Division Town as a sixteen-year-old in May 1955. The following season was to be Town's last in the top flight for fourteen years. A right-sided player with brilliant distribution and pace, Kevin's signature was much sought after by Town boss Andy Beattie, but the young player delayed signing professional forms until after he gained England Youth honours. He eventually became a full-time professional in October 1956 and made an impressive debut against Leicester City, during which he scored Town's second in a 2–2 draw. It was the start of a long career at Leeds Road.

As Johnston attempted to lower the average age of the team, 28-year-old McHale was sidelined and from August 1966 to January 1968 he made just 12 appearances. He was soon transferred to Crewe Alexandra.

== After Huddersfield ==
McHale arrived at Crewe Alexandra in January 1968 and four months later he had helped guide the Railwaymen to promotion from Division Four, which was followed by relegation in 1968–69. He remained at Gresty Road until October 1970, when he moved to Cheshire rivals Chester for £5,000. He made his debut in a 4–2 win against Bournemouth & Boscombe Athletic and was an ever-present for the remainder of the season as Chester just missed out on promotion. He remained with the club the following season and took his tally to four goals in 64 league appearances for Chester before moving to non-league side Hastings United in the summer of 1972.
