= Ken Taylor (cricketer, born 1935) =

English cricketer and footballer (1935–2026)

Personal information
- Full name: Kenneth Taylor
- Date of birth: 21 August 1935
- Place of birth: Huddersfield, West Riding of Yorkshire, England
- Date of death: 27 September 2026 (aged 91)
- Position: Defender

Senior career*
Years	Team	Apps	(Gls)
1953–1965	Huddersfield Town	250	(14)
1965–1967	Bradford (Park Avenue)	51	(1)
1968	Sligo Rovers	5	(0)
- * Club domestic league appearances and goals

Ken Taylor
Cricket information
- Batting: Right-handed
- Bowling: Right-arm medium

International information
- National side: England
- Test debut: 4 June 1959 v India
- Last Test: 2 July 1964 v Australia

Career statistics
Competition	Test	First-class
Matches	3	313
Runs scored	57	13,053
Batting average	11.40	26.74
100s/50s	0/0	16/68
Top score	24	203*
Balls bowled	12	10,631
Wickets	0	131
Bowling average	–	28.72
5 wickets in innings	–	1
10 wickets in match	–	0
Best bowling	–	6/75
Catches/stumpings	1/–	150/–
- Source: CricInfo, 7 November 2022

Kenneth Taylor (21 August 1935 – 27 September 2026) was an English cricketer, who played in three Tests for England from 1959 to 1964. He also played first-class cricket for Yorkshire. Taylor was renowned as a good player of spin and was one of the best cover fielders of his generation, while his medium pace 'darts' broke many a stubborn partnership for his county captains, Vic Wilson and Brian Close.

The cricket correspondent, Colin Bateman, commented that Taylor was, "a fine, straight-hitting batsman and brilliant fielder.... yet he never made full use of his bounteous abilities and was affected by nerves when the stakes were high". Bateman added, "'A total enigma' was how one former team-mate described him".

Taylor was also a professional footballer in the winter, and later a professional artist.

== Early life and education ==
Taylor was born in Huddersfield, Yorkshire, on 21 August 1935. His father repaired looms in the local weaving industry. His maternal grandfather was a ventriloquist, and ran a Punch and Judy show on the beach at Blackpool. His elder brother, Jeff Taylor, played professional football for Huddersfield Town, Fulham and Brentford; he also studied geography at the University of London, and then went to the Royal Academy of Music and became an opera singer. Taylor attended Stile Common School in Huddersfield.

== Football career ==
Taylor joined the groundstaff at Huddersfield Town after leaving school in 1950, and made 250 first-team appearances for them from 1953 to 1965, before playing for Bradford (Park Avenue) from 1965 to 1967, playing as a centre half. He also played for England under 23s. He played in the extraordinary match against Charlton Athletic on 21 December 1957. Charlton played most of the match with ten men after Derek Ufton was injured, and Huddersfield were leading 5–1 with just 27 minutes remaining. At that point, Johnny Summers began an extraordinary passage of play in which he scored five goals and assisted with two others to allow Charlton to win 7–6. Huddersfield became the first, and still the only, team to score six goals in an English Football League match – or indeed any other professional football match – and still be on the losing side.

== Cricket career ==
Taylor was also an important member of the successful Yorkshire team which dominated the County Championship in the 1960s, winning seven titles between 1959 and 1968. Often an opening batsman, he was also an occasional bowler, taking 131 first-class wickets in his career. He was a member of the Yorkshire team that won the final of the third Gillette Cup, in 1965. Taylor made his first appearance for Yorkshire in 1953, aged 17, won his county cap at 21 and played for England at 23, opening the batting against India with Arthur Milton. He was dropped after two matches, but was selected again in 1964, after an epic innings of 160 at Sheffield against the visiting Australians. He broke a finger in that match, and was not selected for his country again. After a benefit, he retired from professional cricket in 1968.

== Art career ==
His father encouraged him to find a job that would continue after he stopped "playing games", and he studied at Huddersfield Art School and then the Slade School of Fine Art in London from 1956, and became a professional artist. After retiring from cricket he taught art at Gresham's School in Norfolk for more than thirty years. His son, Nick Taylor, also played first-class cricket for Yorkshire, Surrey and Somerset.

A biography, Ken Taylor: Drawn to Sport by Stephen Chalke, with illustrations by Taylor, was published in 2006.

== Death ==
Taylor died from complications of dementia on 27 September 2026, aged 91.
