= John Coddington =

English footballer (1937–2023)

Personal information
- Full name: John William Coddington
- Date of birth: 16 December 1937
- Place of birth: Worksop, England
- Date of death: 9 August 2023 (aged 85)
- Place of death: Middlesbrough, England
- Height: 6 ft 1 in (1.85 m)
- Position: Centre half

Youth career
- 1953–1955: Huddersfield Town

Senior career*
Years	Team	Apps	(Gls)
1955–1967	Huddersfield Town	332	(17)
1967–1970	Blackburn Rovers	73	(3)
1970–1971	Stockport County	52	(0)
- Great Harwood Town
1973	Drogheda United		
- * Club domestic league appearances and goals

John William Coddington (16 December 1937 – 9 August 2023) was an English professional footballer who played as a centre half in the Football League for Huddersfield Town, Blackburn Rovers and Stockport County. He played most of his career with Huddersfield Town, spending 14 years at Leeds Road between 1953 and 1967, before joining Blackburn Rovers and then Stockport County.

Coddington along with ex Huddersfield player Les Massie signed for Drogheda United in January 1973 and made his League of Ireland debut on 4 February at Lourdes Stadium.

Coddington later worked as a coach at Bradford City and Middlesbrough.

== Personal life and death ==
Coddington's grandson, Luke, also became a professional footballer, playing as a goalkeeper.

John Coddington died in August 2023, at the age of 85.
