= Ray Wood =

English footballer and manager (1931–2002)

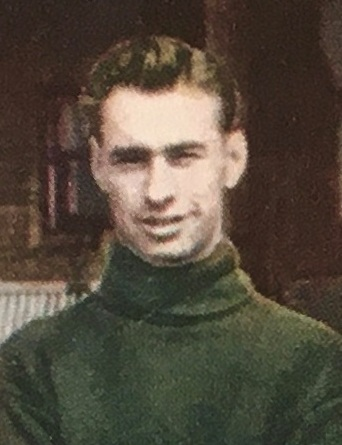
- Wood in 1957

Personal information
- Full name: Raymond Ernest Wood
- Date of birth: 11 June 1931
- Place of birth: Hebburn, County Durham, England
- Date of death: 7 July 2002 (aged 71)
- Place of death: Bexhill-on-Sea, England
- Height: 5 ft 11 in (1.80 m)
- Position: Goalkeeper

Youth career
- 1948–1949: Newcastle United

Senior career*
Years	Team	Apps	(Gls)
1949	Darlington	12	(0)
1949–1958	Manchester United	178	(0)
1958–1965	Huddersfield Town	207	(0)
1965	Toronto Inter-Roma		
1965–1966	Bradford City	32	(0)
1966–1968	Barnsley	30	(0)
Total		459	(0)

International career
1954	England U23	1	(0)
1954–1956	England	3	(0)

Managerial career
- 1968: Los Angeles Wolves
- 1969–1972: Cyprus
- 1972–1973: APOEL
- 1973: Trikala
- 1973–1974: Salymia
- * Club domestic league appearances and goals

Raymond Ernest Wood (11 June 1931 – 7 July 2002) was an English professional football manager and player who played as a goalkeeper.

Known for his pace and agility, Wood had the opportunity to be a professional sprinter, but opted instead to play football. Representing Manchester United, he played in the 1956 and 1957 Football League championship-winning teams. Wood played for England at international level on three occasions between 1954 and 1956.

After retiring from playing in 1968, he managed clubs in the United States, Cyprus, Greece, Kenya and the United Arab Emirates.

== Playing career ==
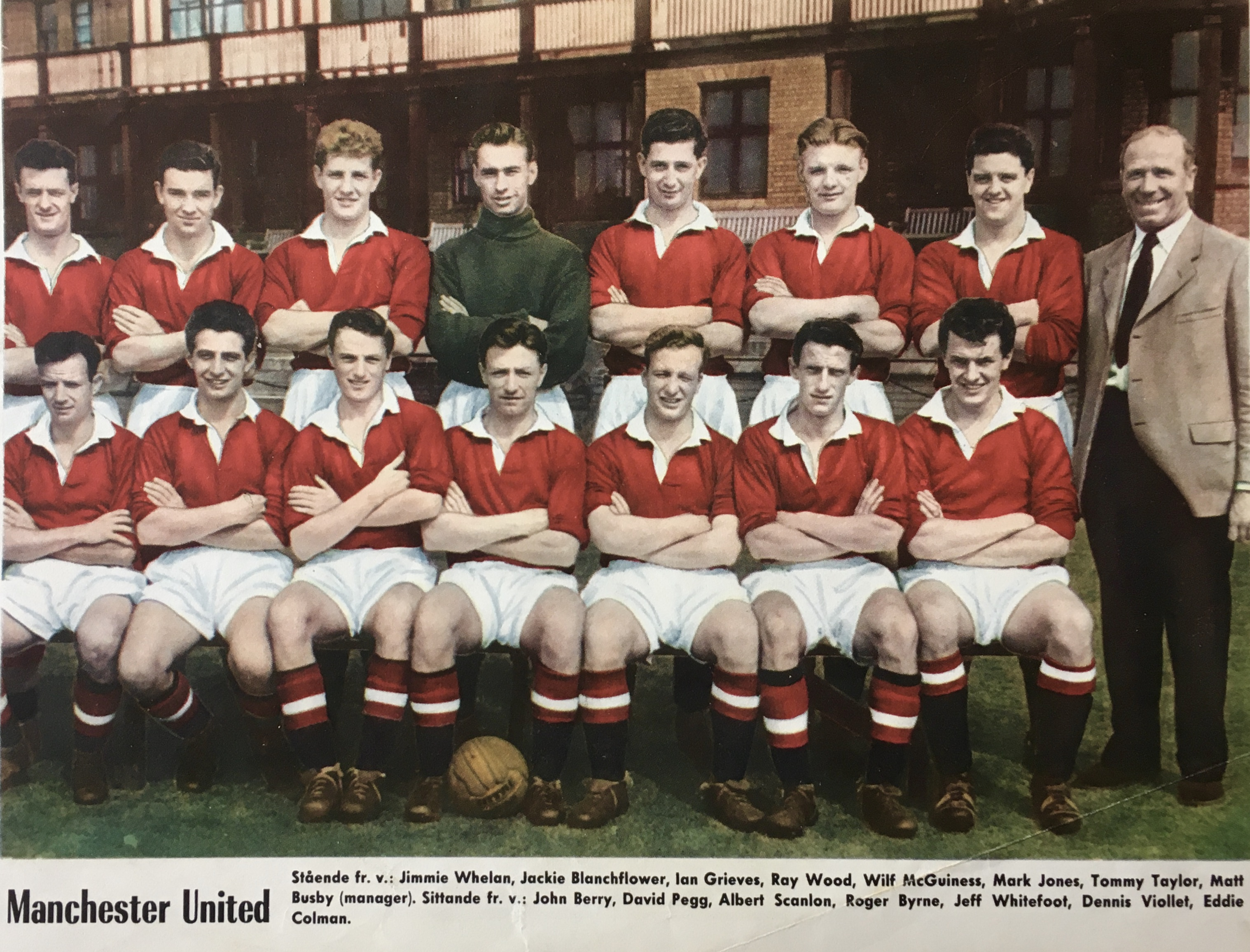
Wood (back row, fourth from left) in a Manchester United team photo in 1957

Wood started his career as an amateur with Newcastle United, though he failed to make a first team appearance and moved to Darlington in 1949. He only stayed for three months though before joining Manchester United, making his first team debut against Newcastle at Old Trafford in the league on 3 December 1949. Over the next few seasons he gradually displaced the ageing Jack Crompton as United's first choice goalkeeper.

During the 1957 FA Cup Final against Aston Villa, Wood was the victim of what was then a perfectly legal shoulder charge. In the sixth minute of the game Wood successfully claimed a cross; however, Villa outside-left Peter McParland clattered into him, breaking Wood's jaw due to him ducking to avoid the challenge. As this game was played in the era before substitutes Jackie Blanchflower was forced to play in goal following the incident, Wood eventually came back on after treatment to play as a forward, United went on to lose the game 2–1. His compensation for this was a Football League First Division title medal to add to the first medal he had gained a year earlier.

In 1954, when only 23 years old, he was selected to play for the England team.

In December 1957, United signed Harry Gregg from Doncaster Rovers for £23,500 – the world record fee for a goalkeeper at the time – and Wood found his first-team opportunities limited.

Wood was among the survivors of the Munich air disaster on 6 February 1958, suffering minor injuries, but played just one first-team game afterwards and was later sold to Huddersfield Town within a year. He spent seven seasons at Huddersfield, playing more than 250 first-team games, although he was unable to help them win promotion to the First Division. In 1965, he played in the Eastern Canada Professional Soccer League with Toronto Inter-Roma. He then played one season at Bradford City, before finishing his career with two seasons at Barnsley.

Several years after leaving Manchester United, Matt Busby unsuccessfully tried to re-sign him for Manchester United when Harry Gregg was injured.

== Managerial career ==
Wood continued as a manager in several countries including United States, Ireland, Zambia, Canada, Greece, Kenya, Kuwait and United Arab Emirates. He coached Cyprus and Kenya national teams. He also coached the NASL team Los Angeles Wolves and the Cypriot team APOEL in 1971–72.

== Personal life ==
Wood married his wife Elizabeth in 1954. They had two daughters, but the couple divorced during the 1970s. He died in July 2002 aged 71 in Bexhill-on-Sea, having returned to England after the end of his coaching career overseas. His death was the result of a heart attack.

== Honours ==
Manchester United

- Football League First Division: 1951–52, 1955–56, 1956–57
- FA Charity Shield: 1952, 1956, 1957
- FA Cup runner-up: 1956–57
