= Denis Atkins =

English footballer

Personal information
- Date of birth: 8 November 1938
- Place of birth: Bradford, England
- Date of death: 13 September 2016 (aged 77)
- Position: Full back

Youth career
- 1955–1960: Huddersfield Town

Senior career*
Years	Team	Apps	(Gls)
1955–1968	Huddersfield Town	194	(0)
1968–1971	Bradford City	108	(0)
- * Club domestic league appearances and goals

Denis Atkins (8 November 1938 – 13 September 2016) was a professional English footballer who played as a defender for Huddersfield Town and Bradford City during his 12-year career between 1959 and 1971.

== Sources ==
- Frost, Terry (1988). Bradford City A Complete Record 1903-1988. Breedon Books Sport. p. 83. ISBN 0-907969-38-0.
