= Eddie Boot =

English footballer and manager

Personal information
- Full name: Edmund Boot
- Date of birth: 13 October 1915
- Place of birth: Laughton Common, England
- Date of death: 1999 (aged 83–84)
- Height: 5 ft 6 in (1.68 m)
- Position: Left half

Senior career*
Years	Team	Apps	(Gls)
- Aughton
- Denaby United
1934–1937	Sheffield United	41	(0)
1937–1952	Huddersfield Town	305	(5)

Managerial career
- 1959–1960: Huddersfield Town (caretaker)
- 1960–1964: Huddersfield Town
- * Club domestic league appearances and goals

Edmund Boot (13 October 1915 – 1999) was an English professional footballer who played in the Football League as a left half for Sheffield United and Huddersfield Town. He went on to become manager of Huddersfield Town.

Boot was born in Laughton Common, near Rotherham. He played non-league football for Aughton and Denaby United before joining Sheffield United in 1934. He played 41 matches for the club in the Second Division, then in 1937 signed for First Division club Huddersfield Town. He appeared in the 1938 FA Cup Final, captained the side in the post-war period, and played 305 games for Huddersfield, all in the First Division, before retiring as a player in 1952. He then joined the coaching staff at the club, and in 1959 was appointed manager, a post which he held for four years. Boot died in 1999.

== Honours ==
Huddersfield Town

- FA Cup runner-up: 1937–38
