= Les Massie =

Scottish footballer (1935–2020)

Personal information
- Full name: Leslie Massie
- Date of birth: 20 July 1935
- Place of birth: Aberdeen, Scotland
- Date of death: 11 November 2020 (aged 85)
- Position: Forward

Youth career
- –1956: Banks o' Dee

Senior career*
Years	Team	Apps	(Gls)
1956–1966	Huddersfield Town	335	(100)
1966–1967	Darlington	20	(2)
1967–1969	Halifax Town	89	(41)
1969–1970	Bradford Park Avenue	14	(2)
1970–1971	Workington	62	(15)
1972–1973	Drogheda United	?	(?)
- * Club domestic league appearances and goals

Leslie "Les" Massie (20 July 1935 – 11 November 2020) was a Scottish footballer, who played most of his games during the 1950s and 1960s for Huddersfield Town.

== Biography ==
Massie and ex-Huddersfield player John Coddington signed for Drogheda United in January 1973. He made his League of Ireland debut on 4 February 1973 at Lourdes Stadium.

In 2006, he was named on Huddersfield's 100 fans' favourites of all time.

Massie died on 11 November 2020.
