= 1955–56 Huddersfield Town A.F.C. season =

Huddersfield Town
1955–56 season
- Chairman: Dick Parker; J. Bernard Newman
- Manager: Andy Beattie
- Stadium: Leeds Road
- Football League First Division: 21st (relegated)
- FA Cup: Third round (eliminated by Bolton Wanderers)
- Top goalscorer: League: Jimmy Glazzard (11); All: Jimmy Glazzard (11)
- Highest home attendance: 37,780 vs Manchester United (31 March 1956)
- Lowest home attendance: 9,224 vs Birmingham City (7 March 1956)
- Biggest win: 4–0 vs Sunderland (24 December 1955); 4–0 vs Charlton Athletic (14 April 1956)
- Biggest defeat: 0–5 vs Birmingham City (19 November 1955)

Huddersfield Town's 1955–56 campaign saw Town relegated from Division 1. They finished in 21st position with 35 points, the same as 20th placed Aston Villa, who survived due to a superior goal average. The season was a cramped affair in the league standings, with difference in points between 2nd placed Blackpool and bottom placed Sheffield United, being just 16 points.

== Squad at the start of the season ==
Note: Flags indicate national team as defined under FIFA eligibility rules; some limited exceptions apply. Players may hold more than one non-FIFA nationality.

Pos.	Nation	Player
GK	ENG	Harry Mills
GK	ENG	Jack Wheeler
DF	ENG	John Battye
DF	ENG	Jack Connor
DF	ENG	Tony Conwell
DF	ENG	Brian Gibson
DF	ENG	Laurie Kelly
DF	ENG	Bill McGarry
DF	ENG	Len Quested
DF	ENG	Ken Taylor

Pos.	Nation	Player
MF	NIR	Gerry Burrell
MF	SCO	Willie Davie
MF	ENG	Albert Hobson
MF	ENG	Jackie Marriott
MF	ENG	Vic Metcalfe
FW	ENG	Tommy Cavanagh
FW	ENG	Bryan Frear
FW	ENG	Jimmy Glazzard
FW	ENG	Ron Simpson
FW	SCO	Jimmy Watson

== Review ==
Following the previous season's failure to improve on the season before's 3rd-placed finish, some were wondering what Town would conjure up under Andy Beattie. The start of the season was dreadful for Town, with many losses sending Town into a downward spiral to the bottom of Division 1. Even the signing of Aston Villa striker Dave Hickson didn't halt the slide to Division 2. A run of 7 defeats in a row, including a 5–2 defeat at Everton, followed immediately by a 6–2 defeat to Newcastle United at Leeds Road didn't help things much.

February to April saw Town mount a recovery mainly through the goals of Jimmy Glazzard, Dave Hickson and Vic Metcalfe. Town still had a chance of survival with 4 matches to go, although they realistically had to win all their last 4 games against West Bromwich Albion, Charlton Athletic, Tottenham Hotspur and Charlton Athletic. They did manage to achieve this, but an inferior goal average meant that Town went down, while Aston Villa survived.

== Squad at the end of the season ==
Note: Flags indicate national team as defined under FIFA eligibility rules; some limited exceptions apply. Players may hold more than one non-FIFA nationality.

Pos.	Nation	Player
GK	ENG	Harry Fearnley
GK	ENG	Jack Wheeler
DF	ENG	John Battye
DF	ENG	Ron Cockerill
DF	ENG	John Coddington
DF	ENG	Jack Connor
DF	ENG	Tony Conwell
DF	ENG	Brian Gibson
DF	ENG	Laurie Kelly
DF	ENG	Bill McGarry
DF	ENG	Len Quested
DF	ENG	Ken Taylor

Pos.	Nation	Player
DF	ENG	Ray Wilson
MF	NIR	Gerry Burrell
MF	SCO	Willie Davie
MF	SCO	Bob Ledger
MF	ENG	Jackie Marriott
MF	ENG	Vic Metcalfe
FW	ENG	Tommy Cavanagh
FW	ENG	Bryan Frear
FW	ENG	Jimmy Glazzard
FW	ENG	Dave Hickson
FW	ENG	Ron Simpson
FW	SCO	Jimmy Watson

== Results ==
=== Division One ===
Date	Opponents	H / A	Result F – A	Scorers	Attendance	Position
20 August 1955	Portsmouth	H	1–0	Watson	21,062	1st
24 August 1955	Chelsea	H	1–3	Glazzard	20,308	14th
27 August 1955	Sunderland	A	1–4	Cavanagh	42,369	17th
29 August 1955	Chelsea	A	0–0		25,883	16th
3 September 1955	Aston Villa	H	1–1	Glazzard	19,805	17th
10 September 1955	Wolverhampton Wanderers	A	0–4		43,954	20th
17 September 1955	Manchester City	H	3–3	McGarry, Metcalfe (pen), Connor	26,443	21st
24 September 1955	Cardiff City	A	2–1	Watson, Davie	25,117	18th
1 October 1955	Preston North End	H	2–2	Watson, Glazzard	23,892	16th
8 October 1955	Burnley	A	0–2		22,109	19th
15 October 1955	Luton Town	H	0–2		19,621	21st
22 October 1955	Manchester United	A	0–3		34,150	21st
29 October 1955	Sheffield United	H	1–2	Glazzard	17,832	21st
5 November 1955	Everton	A	2–5	Glazzard, Lello (og)	36,423	21st
12 November 1955	Newcastle United	H	2–6	Cavanagh, Watson	18,664	22nd
19 November 1955	Birmingham City	A	0–5		24,841	22nd
26 November 1955	West Bromwich Albion	H	1–0	Metcalfe (pen)	18,731	22nd
3 December 1955	Charlton Athletic	A	1–4	Metcalfe (pen)	16,728	22nd
10 December 1955	Tottenham Hotspur	H	1–0	Glazzard	11,094	22nd
17 December 1955	Portsmouth	A	2–5	Metcalfe (pen), Watson	16,347	22nd
24 December 1955	Sunderland	H	4–0	Quested, Marriott, Glazzard (2)	21,803	22nd
26 December 1955	Blackpool	A	2–4	Glazzard, Hickson	27,628	22nd
27 December 1955	Blackpool	H	3–1	Metcalfe (2), Gratrix (og)	34,619	22nd
31 December 1955	Aston Villa	A	0–3		24,993	22nd
2 January 1956	Bolton Wanderers	A	2–2	Hartle (og), Cavanagh	39,524	22nd
14 January 1956	Wolverhampton Wanderers	H	1–3	Metcalfe (pen)	14,587	22nd
21 January 1956	Manchester City	A	0–1		21,076	22nd
4 February 1956	Cardiff City	H	1–2	Metcalfe (pen)	12,586	22nd
11 February 1956	Preston North End	A	2–1	Hickson (2)	17,363	22nd
18 February 1956	Burnley	H	1–0	Cavanagh	16,243	21st
25 February 1956	Luton Town	A	2–1	McGarry (2)	15,331	21st
7 March 1956	Birmingham City	H	1–1	Simpson	9,224	20th
10 March 1956	Sheffield United	A	1–3	Quested	30,382	21st
17 March 1956	Everton	H	1–0	Hickson	18,807	21st
24 March 1956	Newcastle United	A	1–1	Davie	20,008	20th
31 March 1956	Manchester United	H	0–2		37,780	22nd
2 April 1956	Arsenal	A	0–2		30,836	22nd
3 April 1956	Arsenal	H	0–1		24,469	22nd
7 April 1956	West Bromwich Albion	A	2–1	Hickson, Glazzard	16,141	22nd
14 April 1956	Charlton Athletic	H	4–0	Metcalfe (2), McGarry, Hickson	14,065	22nd
21 April 1956	Tottenham Hotspur	A	2–1	Norman (og), Hickson	36,387	21st
28 April 1956	Bolton Wanderers	H	3–1	Glazzard, Hickson (2)	18,877	21st

=== FA Cup ===
Date	Round	Opponents	H / A	Result F – A	Scorers	Attendance
7 January 1956	Round 3	Bolton Wanderers	A	0–0	Match abandoned after 46 minutes due to fog	?
11 January 1956	Round 3	Bolton Wanderers	A	0–3		20,862

== Appearances and goals ==
Name	Nationality	Position	League		FA Cup		Total	
Name	Nationality	Position	Apps	Goals	Apps	Goals	Apps	Goals
John Battye	England	DF	8	0	0	0	8	0
Gerry Burrell	Northern Ireland	MF	4	0	0	0	4	0
Tommy Cavanagh	England	FW	19	4	1	0	20	4
Ron Cockerill	England	DF	1	0	0	0	1	0
John Coddington	England	DF	1	0	0	0	1	0
Jack Connor	England	DF	2	1	0	0	2	1
Tony Conwell	England	DF	18	0	0	0	18	0
Willie Davie	Scotland	FW	21	2	0	0	21	2
Harry Fearnley	England	GK	13	0	0	0	13	0
Bryan Frear	England	FW	7	0	0	0	7	0
Brian Gibson	England	DF	28	0	1	0	29	0
Jimmy Glazzard	England	FW	27	11	1	0	28	11
Dave Hickson	England	FW	26	9	1	0	27	9
Albert Hobson	England	MF	3	0	0	0	3	0
Laurie Kelly	England	DF	28	0	1	0	29	0
Bob Ledger	England	MF	1	0	0	0	1	0
Jackie Marriott	England	MF	27	1	1	0	28	1
Bill McGarry	England	DF	40	4	1	0	41	4
Vic Metcalfe	England	MF	31	10	1	0	32	10
Harry Mills	England	GK	10	0	0	0	10	0
Len Quested	England	DF	42	2	1	0	43	2
Ron Simpson	England	FW	21	1	0	0	21	1
Ken Taylor	England	DF	36	0	1	0	37	0
Jimmy Watson	Scotland	MF	23	5	0	0	23	5
Jack Wheeler	England	GK	19	0	1	0	20	0
Ray Wilson	England	DF	6	0	0	0	6	0
