= 1951–52 Huddersfield Town A.F.C. season =

Huddersfield Town
1951–52 season
- Chairman: Haydn Battye
- Manager: George Stephenson (until 11 March 1952); Andy Beattie (from 24 April 1952)
- Stadium: Leeds Road
- Football League First Division: 21st (relegated)
- FA Cup: Third round (eliminated by Tranmere Rovers)
- Top goalscorer: League: Jimmy Glazzard (10); All: Jimmy Glazzard (10)
- Highest home attendance: 33,584 vs Blackpool (25 August 1951)
- Lowest home attendance: 8,260 vs Fulham (8 December 1951)
- Biggest win: 5–1 vs Manchester City (22 August 1951)
- Biggest defeat: 1–7 vs Wolverhampton Wanderers (19 September 1951); 1–7 vs Sunderland (11 April 1952)
Home colours

Huddersfield Town's 1951–52 campaign was Town's 32nd consecutive season in the 1st Division, but relegation would send Town to the 2nd Division since the 1919–20 season. Under the leadership of George Stephenson, Town recorded some of their worst ever results in their history, including 7–1 defeats by Wolverhampton Wanderers and Sunderland, as well as a 6–2 defeat by Newcastle United.

== Squad at the start of the season ==
Note: Flags indicate national team as defined under FIFA eligibility rules; some limited exceptions apply. Players may hold more than one non-FIFA nationality.

Pos.	Nation	Player
GK	ENG	Ronald Humpston
GK	ENG	Harry Mills
GK	ENG	Jack Wheeler
DF	ENG	John Battye
DF	ENG	Eddie Boot
DF	NIR	Charlie Gallogly
DF	ENG	Arthur Green
DF	ENG	George Howe
DF	ENG	Laurie Kelly
DF	ENG	Don McEvoy

Pos.	Nation	Player
DF	ENG	Bill McGarry
MF	SCO	Ian Duthie
MF	SCO	Alistair Gunn
MF	NIR	Johnny McKenna
MF	ENG	Vic Metcalfe
FW	ENG	Ronnie Burke
FW	ENG	Jimmy Glazzard
FW	ENG	Harold Hassall
FW	ENG	Albert Nightingale
FW	ENG	Jeff Taylor

== Review ==
Since the end of World War II, Town's league form was in dire need of a boost, but unfortunately George Stephenson's team would soon find out the hard way that staying in Division 1 would be harder than even he imagined. Things weren't made easier with dreadful results against Wolverhampton Wanderers, Preston North End, Newcastle United and Sunderland.

Stephenson would leave Leeds Road in March and would be replaced by Stockport County manager Andy Beattie before the end of the season. Town finished in 21st place with 28 points, 3 points behind 20th placed Stoke City.

== Squad at the end of the season ==
Note: Flags indicate national team as defined under FIFA eligibility rules; some limited exceptions apply. Players may hold more than one non-FIFA nationality.

Pos.	Nation	Player
GK	ENG	Ronald Humpston
GK	ENG	Harry Mills
GK	ENG	Jack Wheeler
DF	ENG	John Battye
DF	ENG	Eddie Boot
DF	NIR	Charlie Gallogly
DF	ENG	Arthur Green
DF	ENG	George Howe
DF	ENG	Laurie Kelly
DF	ENG	Don McEvoy
DF	ENG	Bill McGarry

Pos.	Nation	Player
DF	ENG	Len Quested
MF	SCO	Willie Davie
MF	SCO	Ian Duthie
MF	SCO	Alistair Gunn
MF	NIR	Johnny McKenna
MF	ENG	Vic Metcalfe
FW	ENG	Ronnie Burke
FW	ENG	Bryan Frear
FW	ENG	Jimmy Glazzard
FW	ENG	Roy Shiner
FW	ENG	Ron Simpson

== Results ==
=== Division One ===
Date	Opponents	H / A	Result F–A	Scorers	Attendance	Position
18 August 1951	Arsenal	A	2–2	Taylor, Glazzard	54,072	11th
22 August 1951	Manchester City	H	5–1	McGarry, Nightingale (2), Hassall, Taylor	25,623	4th
25 August 1951	Blackpool	H	1–3	Taylor	33,584	10th
29 August 1951	Manchester City	A	0–3		30,863	16th
1 September 1951	Liverpool	A	1–2	Metcalfe (pen)	39,818	18th
8 September 1951	Portsmouth	H	0–1		25,861	20th
10 September 1951	Aston Villa	A	0–1		38,046	20th
15 September 1951	Chelsea	A	1–2	Hassall	25,129	21st
19 September 1951	Aston Villa	H	3–1	Taylor (2), Blanchflower (og)	19,994	19th
22 September 1951	Middlesbrough	H	1–0	Hassall	27,995	15th
29 September 1951	Wolverhampton Wanderers	H	1–7	Metcalfe	32,496	18th
6 October 1951	West Bromwich Albion	A	0–0		24,236	19th
13 October 1951	Newcastle United	H	2–4	Harvey (og), Brennan (og)	32,945	21st
20 October 1951	Bolton Wanderers	A	1–2	Metcalfe	33,670	22nd
27 October 1951	Stoke City	H	0–2		19,496	22nd
3 November 1951	Manchester United	A	1–1	Metcalfe (pen)	25,616	21st
10 November 1951	Tottenham Hotspur	H	1–1	Burke	30,259	21st
17 November 1951	Preston North End	A	2–5	Glazzard (2)	31,695	21st
24 November 1951	Burnley	H	1–3	Cummings (og)	14,882	22nd
1 December 1951	Charlton Athletic	A	0–4		24,245	22nd
8 December 1951	Fulham	H	1–0	Pavitt (og)	8,260	21st
15 December 1951	Arsenal	H	2–3	Davie, Gunn	22,427	22nd
22 December 1951	Blackpool	A	1–3	Gunn	14,923	22nd
25 December 1951	Derby County	H	1–1	Simpson	28,418	22nd
26 December 1951	Derby County	A	1–2	Simpson	24,896	22nd
29 December 1951	Liverpool	H	1–2	Glazzard	25,500	22nd
5 January 1952	Portsmouth	A	1–3	Gunn	30,048	22nd
19 January 1952	Chelsea	H	1–0	Metcalfe (pen)	19,315	22nd
26 January 1952	Middlesbrough	A	1–2	McGarry	22,876	22nd
9 February 1952	Wolverhampton Wanderers	A	0–0		26,965	22nd
16 February 1952	West Bromwich Albion	H	3–0	Kelly, Rickaby (og), Gunn	16,983	22nd
1 March 1952	Newcastle United	A	2–6	Kelly, Davie	51,394	22nd
8 March 1952	Bolton Wanderers	H	0–2		24,045	22nd
15 March 1952	Stoke City	A	0–0		19,602	22nd
22 March 1952	Manchester United	H	3–2	Glazzard (2), Metcalfe (pen)	30,316	22nd
2 April 1952	Tottenham Hotspur	A	0–1		22,396	22nd
5 April 1952	Preston North End	H	2–0	Glazzard, McEvoy	15,815	21st
11 April 1952	Sunderland	A	1–7	Glazzard	34,640	21st
12 April 1952	Burnley	A	2–0	Metcalfe, Glazzard	23,081	21st
15 April 1952	Sunderland	H	2–2	Metcalfe (pen), Glazzard	32,961	21st
19 April 1952	Charlton Athletic	H	1–0	Boot	22,079	20th
26 April 1952	Fulham	A	0–1		21,295	21st

=== FA Cup ===
Date	Round	Opponents	H / A	Result F–A	Scorers	Attendance
12 January 1952	Round 3	Tranmere Rovers	H	1–2	Metcalfe (pen)	30,314

== Appearances and goals ==
Name	Nationality	Position	League		FA Cup		Total	
Name	Nationality	Position	Apps	Goals	Apps	Goals	Apps	Goals
John Battye	England	DF	9	0	0	0	9	0
Eddie Boot	England	DF	26	1	0	0	26	1
Ronnie Burke	England	FW	13	1	0	0	13	1
Willie Davie	Scotland	FW	20	2	1	0	21	2
Bryan Frear	England	FW	1	0	0	0	1	0
Charlie Gallogly	Northern Ireland	DF	31	0	1	0	32	0
Brian Gibson	England	DF	1	0	0	0	1	0
Jimmy Glazzard	England	FW	18	10	1	0	19	10
Arthur Green	England	DF	3	0	0	0	3	0
Alistair Gunn	Scotland	MF	24	4	1	0	25	4
Harold Hassall	England	FW	21	3	0	0	21	3
George Howe	England	DF	14	0	0	0	14	0
Ronald Humpston	England	GK	5	0	0	0	5	0
Laurie Kelly	England	DF	37	2	1	0	38	2
Don McEvoy	England	DF	35	1	1	0	36	1
Bill McGarry	England	DF	42	2	1	0	43	2
Johnny McKenna	Northern Ireland	MF	25	0	0	0	25	0
Vic Metcalfe	England	MF	38	8	1	1	39	9
Harry Mills	England	GK	20	0	1	0	21	0
Albert Nightingale	England	MF	7	2	0	0	7	2
Len Quested	England	DF	27	0	1	0	28	0
Roy Shiner	England	FW	9	0	0	0	9	0
Ron Simpson	England	FW	6	2	1	0	7	2
Jeff Taylor	England	FW	13	5	0	0	13	5
Jack Wheeler	England	GK	17	0	0	0	17	0
