= 1952–53 Huddersfield Town A.F.C. season =

Huddersfield Town
1952–53 season
- Chairman: Dick Parker
- Manager: Andy Beattie
- Stadium: Leeds Road
- Football League Second Division: 2nd (promoted)
- FA Cup: Fourth round (eliminated by Blackpool)
- Top goalscorer: League: Jimmy Glazzard (30); All: Jimmy Glazzard (31)
- Highest home attendance: 43,339 vs Sheffield United (3 January 1953)
- Lowest home attendance: 18,023 vs Blackburn Rovers (14 February 1953)
- Biggest win: 6–0 vs Barnsley (6 September 1952); 8–2 vs Everton (7 April 1953)
- Biggest defeat: 0–3 vs Blackburn Rovers (14 February 1953)

Huddersfield Town's 1952–53 campaign was Town's first season back in the 2nd Division since the 1919–20 season. Under the leadership of Andy Beattie, Town returned to the top flight at the first attempt. They finished in 2nd place behind Sheffield United by 2 points, with 58 points. The main reasons for Town's success during the season were the 45 goals between Jimmy Glazzard and Vic Metcalfe. Also, 7 of Town's players (Jack Wheeler, Ron Staniforth, Laurie Kelly, Bill McGarry, Don McEvoy, Len Quested and Vic Metcalfe) played every game in the season, while Jimmy Glazzard missed just the last game of the season.

== Squad at the start of the season ==
Note: Flags indicate national team as defined under FIFA eligibility rules; some limited exceptions apply. Players may hold more than one non-FIFA nationality.

Pos.	Nation	Player
GK	ENG	Harry Mills
GK	ENG	Jack Wheeler
DF	ENG	John Battye
DF	ENG	Brian Gibson
DF	ENG	George Howe
DF	ENG	Laurie Kelly
DF	ENG	Don McEvoy
DF	ENG	Bill McGarry
DF	ENG	Len Quested
DF	ENG	Ron Staniforth
MF	SCO	Willie Davie

Pos.	Nation	Player
MF	SCO	Ian Duthie
MF	SCO	Alistair Gunn
MF	NIR	Johnny McKenna
MF	ENG	Vic Metcalfe
FW	ENG	Tommy Cavanagh
FW	ENG	Bryan Frear
FW	ENG	Jimmy Glazzard
FW	ENG	Roy Shiner
FW	ENG	Ron Simpson
FW	SCO	Jimmy Watson

== Review ==
Andy Beattie's first full season in charge of the Terriers had one simple objective – return Town to the top flight as soon as possible. The start of the season saw Town go on a 10-match unbeaten run, abruptly ended by a defeat at home to Nottingham Forest in early October. This was then followed by 5 consecutive wins, followed swiftly by 2 consecutive losses to Leicester City and West Ham United. Town's form continued to improve with Town only losing 5 more matches between December and the end of the season on 1 May.

The main reason for Town's success was their defence which remained unchanged all season. The 6-man defence of Jack Wheeler in goal, protected by Ron Staniforth, Laurie Kelly, Bill McGarry, Don McEvoy and Len Quested only let in 33 league goals all season, 22 less than champions Sheffield United. Vic Metcalfe played every game as well, while 30-goal Jimmy Glazzard just missed the final game against Plymouth Argyle. His replacement, Roy Shiner, scored a hat-trick in a 4–0 win, which cemented Town's second-place finish and guaranteed their return to Division 1 after one season out.

== Squad at the end of the season ==
Note: Flags indicate national team as defined under FIFA eligibility rules; some limited exceptions apply. Players may hold more than one non-FIFA nationality.

Pos.	Nation	Player
GK	ENG	Harry Mills
GK	ENG	Jack Wheeler
DF	ENG	John Battye
DF	ENG	Brian Gibson
DF	ENG	George Howe
DF	ENG	Laurie Kelly
DF	ENG	Don McEvoy
DF	ENG	Bill McGarry
DF	ENG	Len Quested
DF	ENG	Ron Staniforth
MF	SCO	Willie Davie

Pos.	Nation	Player
MF	SCO	Ian Duthie
MF	SCO	Alistair Gunn
MF	NIR	Johnny McKenna
MF	ENG	Vic Metcalfe
FW	ENG	Tommy Cavanagh
FW	ENG	Bryan Frear
FW	ENG	Jimmy Glazzard
FW	ENG	Roy Shiner
FW	ENG	Ron Simpson
FW	SCO	Jimmy Watson

== Results ==
=== Division Two ===
Date	Opponents	H / A	Result F–A	Scorers	Attendance	Position
23 August 1952	Leeds United	H	1–0	Glazzard	35,230	1st
27 August 1952	Brentford	H	0–0		21,358	5th
30 August 1952	Sheffield United	A	2–0	Watson, Glazzard	34,872	1st
3 September 1952	Brentford	A	3–1	Glazzard (2), Metcalfe	21,733	1st
6 September 1952	Barnsley	H	6–0	Glazzard (2), Metcalfe (2, 1 pen), Davie, Quested	33,157	1st
9 September 1952	Doncaster Rovers	A	1–1	Watson	27,614	1st
13 September 1952	Lincoln City	A	2–2	Glazzard, Metcalfe	21,884	1st
17 September 1952	Doncaster Rovers	H	3–1	Watson, Glazzard, Gunn	26,504	1st
20 September 1952	Hull City	H	1–1	Metcalfe (pen)	34,411	1st
27 September 1952	Blackburn Rovers	A	1–1	Glazzard	29,429	1st
4 October 1952	Nottingham Forest	H	1–2	Gunn	27,813	2nd
11 October 1952	Luton Town	H	3–0	Watson, Glazzard, Gunn	26,345	2nd
18 October 1952	Birmingham City	A	2–0	Watson, Glazzard	26,484	1st
25 October 1952	Bury	H	2–0	Metcalfe, Glazzard	28,870	1st
1 November 1952	Southampton	A	2–0	Cavanagh, Glazzard	20,867	1st
8 November 1952	Notts County	H	1–0	Metcalfe	28,205	1st
15 November 1952	Leicester City	A	1–2	Glazzard	39,908	1st
22 November 1952	West Ham United	H	0–1		22,267	2nd
29 November 1952	Fulham	A	2–0	Davie, Metcalfe	25,000	2nd
6 December 1952	Rotherham United	H	1–0	Metcalfe	31,312	2nd
13 December 1952	Plymouth Argyle	A	2–0	McGarry, Glazzard	33,228	2nd
20 December 1952	Leeds United	A	1–2	Glazzard	34,365	2nd
25 December 1952	Swansea Town	H	3–0	Davie, Metcalfe, Glazzard	28,510	2nd
27 December 1952	Swansea Town	A	3–3	Glazzard, Dunn, Davie	24,978	2nd
3 January 1953	Sheffield United	H	1–1	Furniss (og)	43,339	2nd
17 January 1953	Barnsley	A	4–2	Cavanagh (3), Glazzard	28,728	2nd
24 January 1953	Lincoln City	H	5–0	Glazzard (2), Watson, Cavanagh (2)	26,512	2nd
7 February 1953	Hull City	A	2–0	Glazzard (2)	26,081	2nd
14 February 1953	Blackburn Rovers	H	0–3		18,023	2nd
21 February 1953	Nottingham Forest	A	0–1		25,074	2nd
28 February 1953	Luton Town	A	2–0	Glazzard, Shiner	25,831	2nd
7 March 1953	Birmingham City	H	1–1	Glazzard	28,636	2nd
14 March 1953	Bury	A	1–1	Quested	19,334	2nd
24 March 1953	Southampton	H	5–0	Metcalfe (2), Cavanagh, Glazzard, Quested	21,797	2nd
28 March 1953	Notts County	A	0–1		15,810	2nd
4 April 1953	Leicester City	H	1–0	Shiner	26,822	2nd
6 April 1953	Everton	A	1–2	Lindsay (og)	48,221	2nd
7 April 1953	Everton	H	8–2	Davie, Glazzard (4), Metcalfe, Gunn, Cavanagh	30,721	2nd
11 April 1953	West Ham United	A	1–0	Cavanagh	22,801	2nd
18 April 1953	Fulham	H	4–2	Cavanagh, Gunn, Metcalfe (2)	23,950	2nd
25 April 1953	Rotherham United	A	0–0		19,777	2nd
1 May 1953	Plymouth Argyle	H	4–0	Shiner (3), Gunn	19,624	2nd

=== FA Cup ===
Date	Round	Opponents	H / A	Result F–A	Scorers	Attendance
10 January 1953	Round 3	Bristol Rovers	H	2–0	Glazzard, Watson	34,967
31 January 1953	Round 4	Blackpool	A	0–1		29,239

== Appearances and goals ==
Name	Nationality	Position	League		FA Cup		Total	
Name	Nationality	Position	Apps	Goals	Apps	Goals	Apps	Goals
Tommy Cavanagh	England	FW	21	10	1	0	22	10
Willie Davie	Scotland	FW	31	5	2	0	33	5
Ian Duthie	Scotland	MF	6	0	2	0	8	0
Jimmy Glazzard	England	FW	41	30	2	1	43	31
Alistair Gunn	Scotland	MF	33	7	0	0	33	7
Laurie Kelly	England	DF	42	0	2	0	44	0
Don McEvoy	England	DF	42	0	2	0	44	0
Bill McGarry	England	DF	42	1	2	0	44	1
Johnny McKenna	Northern Ireland	MF	2	0	0	0	2	0
Vic Metcalfe	England	MF	42	15	2	0	44	15
Len Quested	England	DF	42	3	2	0	44	3
Roy Shiner	England	FW	6	5	0	0	6	5
Ron Staniforth	England	DF	42	0	2	0	44	0
Jimmy Watson	Scotland	MF	28	6	1	1	29	7
Jack Wheeler	England	GK	42	0	2	0	44	0
