= 1953–54 Huddersfield Town A.F.C. season =

Huddersfield Town
1953–54 season
- Chairman: Dick Parker
- Manager: Andy Beattie
- Stadium: Leeds Road
- Football League First Division: 3rd
- FA Cup: Third round (eliminated by West Ham United)
- Top goalscorer: League: Jimmy Glazzard (29); All: Jimmy Glazzard (29)
- Highest home attendance: 48,237 vs West Bromwich Albion (27 February 1954)
- Lowest home attendance: 20,896 vs Charlton Athletic (27 March 1954)
- Biggest win: 5–1 vs Portsmouth (29 August 1953); 4–0 vs Aston Villa (3 October 1953)
- Biggest defeat: 0–4 vs West Bromwich Albion (10 October 1953); 0–4 vs West Ham United (9 January 1954); 0–4 vs Wolverhampton Wanderers (19 April 1954)

Huddersfield Town's 1953–54 campaign is Town's best ever finish in a season since World War II. Following the previous season's promotion onslaught, Town and especially Jimmy Glazzard made sure that the previous season's achievements weren't forgotten in a hurry. They finished in 3rd place in Division 1 with 51 points, just 6 points behind the champions Wolverhampton Wanderers. The goalscoring feats of Jimmy Glazzard, who scored 29 goals and the assistance of Vic Metcalfe, who himself scored 11 goals helped Town finish in their highest post-war finish to date.

== Squad at the start of the season ==
Note: Flags indicate national team as defined under FIFA eligibility rules; some limited exceptions apply. Players may hold more than one non-FIFA nationality.

Pos.	Nation	Player
GK	ENG	Harry Mills
GK	ENG	Jack Wheeler
DF	ENG	John Battye
DF	ENG	Brian Gibson
DF	ENG	George Howe
DF	ENG	Laurie Kelly
DF	ENG	Don McEvoy
DF	ENG	Bill McGarry
DF	ENG	Len Quested
DF	ENG	Ron Staniforth

Pos.	Nation	Player
MF	SCO	Willie Davie
MF	SCO	Alistair Gunn
MF	ENG	Vic Metcalfe
FW	ENG	Tommy Cavanagh
FW	ENG	Bryan Frear
FW	ENG	Jimmy Glazzard
FW	ENG	Roy Shiner
FW	ENG	Ron Simpson
FW	SCO	Jimmy Watson

== Review ==
Andy Beattie's team were on an all-time high following their immediate return to Division 1 after just one season in Division 2. The start of the season continued where the previous season left off and after 4 games, Town were top of the table with 3 wins, including a 5–1 win over Portsmouth, where Jimmy Glazzard got the first of his 3 hat-tricks that he would achieve during the season. His other 2 came in the space of 3 matches against Sheffield United and Aston Villa.

The team's performances kept them up in the upper realms of the division, with the chance of winning the title, not being too unrealistic. The season ground to a halt near the end, when Vic Metcalfe was forced to miss the last 7 games of the season and many say this was the reason that Town failed to win the title for the first time in 28 years. They did however finish 3rd, just 6 points behind Wolverhampton Wanderers, who Town actually beat in their penultimate game of the season.

== Squad at the end of the season ==
Note: Flags indicate national team as defined under FIFA eligibility rules; some limited exceptions apply. Players may hold more than one non-FIFA nationality.

Pos.	Nation	Player
GK	ENG	Harry Mills
GK	ENG	Jack Wheeler
DF	ENG	John Battye
DF	ENG	Brian Gibson
DF	ENG	George Howe
DF	ENG	Laurie Kelly
DF	ENG	Don McEvoy
DF	ENG	Bill McGarry
DF	ENG	Len Quested
DF	ENG	Ron Staniforth
DF	ENG	Ken Taylor

Pos.	Nation	Player
MF	NIR	Gerry Burrell
MF	SCO	Willie Davie
MF	SCO	Alistair Gunn
MF	ENG	Vic Metcalfe
FW	ENG	Tommy Cavanagh
FW	ENG	Bryan Frear
FW	ENG	Jimmy Glazzard
FW	ENG	Roy Shiner
FW	ENG	Ron Simpson
FW	SCO	Jimmy Watson

== Results ==
=== Division One ===
Date	Opponents	Home/ Away	Result F - A	Scorers	Attendance	Position
19 August 1953	Preston North End	A	2 - 1	Watson (2)	35,925	6th
22 August 1953	Arsenal	A	0 - 0		54,847	4th
26 August 1953	Cardiff City	H	2 - 0	Watson, Metcalfe	30,089	1st
29 August 1953	Portsmouth	H	5 - 1	Glazzard (3), Davie, Watson	22,474	1st
2 September 1953	Cardiff City	A	1 - 2	Glazzard	29,446	2nd
5 September 1953	Blackpool	A	1 - 3	Davie	34,507	6th
9 September 1953	Manchester City	H	1 - 1	Metcalfe	24,341	7th
12 September 1953	Chelsea	H	3 - 1	Davie, Glazzard, Watson	29,631	3rd
16 September 1953	Manchester City	A	1 - 0	McGarry	24,580	3rd
19 September 1953	Sheffield United	A	6 - 3	Glazzard (3), Metcalfe (2), Davie	40,065	2nd
26 September 1953	Middlesbrough	H	2 - 1	Glazzard (2)	37,054	2nd
3 October 1953	Aston Villa	H	4 - 0	Glazzard (3), Metcalfe	36,534	2nd
10 October 1953	West Bromwich Albion	A	0 - 4		47,043	4th
17 October 1953	Liverpool	H	2 - 0	Glazzard, Metcalfe	30,115	3rd
24 October 1953	Newcastle United	A	2 - 0	Glazzard, Brennan (og)	46,644	2nd
31 October 1953	Manchester United	H	0 - 0		34,175	3rd
7 November 1953	Charlton Athletic	A	1 - 2	Glazzard	23,733	3rd
14 November 1953	Sheffield Wednesday	H	2 - 0	Glazzard (2)	30,671	3rd
21 November 1953	Tottenham Hotspur	A	0 - 1		42,503	3rd
28 November 1953	Burnley	H	3 - 1	Glazzard, Davie (2)	34,666	3rd
5 December 1953	Bolton Wanderers	A	0 - 0		36,077	3rd
12 December 1953	Preston North End	H	2 - 2	Cavanagh, Metcalfe (pen)	26,972	3rd
19 December 1953	Arsenal	H	2 - 2	Glazzard (2)	34,018	3rd
25 December 1953	Sunderland	A	1 - 1	Watson	36,751	4th
26 December 1953	Sunderland	H	2 - 1	Cavanagh, Metcalfe	40,898	3rd
2 January 1954	Portsmouth	A	2 - 5	Mansell (og), Quested	27,533	3rd
16 January 1954	Blackpool	H	0 - 0		25,733	3rd
23 January 1954	Chelsea	A	2 - 2	Glazzard (2)	45,041	3rd
6 February 1954	Sheffield United	H	2 - 2	Frear (2)	27,335	4th
13 February 1954	Middlesbrough	A	3 - 0	Metcalfe, Burrell, Glazzard	18,717	3rd
20 February 1954	Aston Villa	A	2 - 2	Metcalfe, Glazzard	24,118	3rd
27 February 1954	West Bromwich Albion	H	0 - 2		48,237	3rd
6 March 1954	Liverpool	A	3 - 1	Burrell (2), Cavanagh	46,074	3rd
13 March 1954	Newcastle United	H	3 - 2	Cavanagh (2), Glazzard	25,710	3rd
20 March 1954	Manchester United	A	1 - 3	Metcalfe (pen)	41,184	3rd
27 March 1954	Charlton Athletic	H	4 - 1	McGarry, Frear (2), Cavanagh	20,896	3rd
3 April 1954	Sheffield Wednesday	A	4 - 1	Glazzard, Frear (2, 1 pen), Cavanagh	31,106	3rd
10 April 1954	Tottenham Hotspur	H	2 - 5	Glazzard, Shiner	26,232	3rd
17 April 1954	Burnley	A	1 - 2	Cavanagh	26,180	3rd
19 April 1954	Wolverhampton Wanderers	A	0 - 4		42,862	4th
20 April 1954	Wolverhampton Wanderers	H	2 - 1	Glazzard, McGarry	35,814	3rd
24 April 1954	Bolton Wanderers	H	2 - 1	McGarry (pen), Cavanagh	25,635	3rd

=== FA Cup ===
Date	Round	Opponents	Home/ Away	Result F - A	Scorers	Attendance
9 January 1954	Round 3	West Ham United	A	0 - 4		25,250

== Appearances and goals ==
Name	Nationality	Position	League		FA Cup		Total	
Name	Nationality	Position	Apps	Goals	Apps	Goals	Apps	Goals
John Battye	England	DF	3	0	0	0	3	0
Gerry Burrell	Northern Ireland	MF	19	3	1	0	20	3
Tommy Cavanagh	England	FW	29	9	0	0	29	9
Willie Davie	Scotland	FW	30	6	1	0	31	6
Bryan Frear	England	FW	14	6	0	0	14	6
Brian Gibson	England	DF	2	0	0	0	2	0
Jimmy Glazzard	England	FW	37	29	1	0	38	29
Alistair Gunn	Scotland	MF	23	0	0	0	23	0
George Howe	England	DF	6	0	0	0	6	0
Laurie Kelly	England	DF	36	0	1	0	37	0
Don McEvoy	England	DF	35	0	1	0	36	0
Bill McGarry	England	DF	42	4	1	0	43	4
Vic Metcalfe	England	MF	35	11	1	0	36	11
Harry Mills	England	GK	38	0	1	0	39	0
Len Quested	England	DF	26	1	1	0	27	1
Roy Shiner	England	FW	5	1	0	0	5	1
Ron Simpson	England	FW	1	0	0	0	1	0
Ron Staniforth	England	DF	40	0	1	0	41	0
Ken Taylor	England	DF	7	0	0	0	7	0
Jimmy Watson	Scotland	MF	30	6	1	0	31	6
Jack Wheeler	England	GK	4	0	0	0	4	0
