= 1954–55 Huddersfield Town A.F.C. season =

Huddersfield Town
1954–55 season
- Chairman: Dick Parker
- Manager: Andy Beattie
- Stadium: Leeds Road
- Football League First Division: 12th
- FA Cup: Quarter-finals (eliminated by Newcastle United)
- Top goalscorer: League: Jimmy Glazzard (26); All: Jimmy Glazzard (32)
- Highest home attendance: 54,960 vs Newcastle United (12 March 1955)
- Lowest home attendance: 5,287 vs Aston Villa (23 February 1955)
- Biggest win: 3–0 vs Sheffield Wednesday (13 September 1954)
- Biggest defeat: 0–4 vs Preston North End (5 March 1955); 0–4 vs Everton (23 March 1955)
Home colours

Huddersfield Town's 1954–55 campaign saw Town make a brilliant start in their second season back in the 1st Division. However, a disappointing mid-season ended their chance of improving on their 3rd-place finish the previous season. They eventually finished down in 12th place with 41 points, 7 points behind second placed Wolverhampton Wanderers. This was also the last season in which the leading goalscorer in Division 1 came from the club, when Jimmy Glazzard scored 32 goals, 26 in the League and 6 from Cup matches.

== Squad at the start of the season ==
Note: Flags indicate national team as defined under FIFA eligibility rules; some limited exceptions apply. Players may hold more than one non-FIFA nationality.

Pos.	Nation	Player
GK	ENG	Harry Mills
GK	ENG	Jack Wheeler
DF	ENG	John Battye
DF	ENG	Brian Gibson
DF	ENG	Laurie Kelly
DF	ENG	Don McEvoy
DF	ENG	Bill McGarry
DF	ENG	Len Quested
DF	ENG	Ron Staniforth
DF	ENG	Ken Taylor

Pos.	Nation	Player
MF	NIR	Gerry Burrell
MF	SCO	Willie Davie
MF	ENG	Albert Hobson
MF	ENG	Vic Metcalfe
FW	ENG	Tommy Cavanagh
FW	ENG	Bryan Frear
FW	ENG	Jimmy Glazzard
FW	ENG	Roy Shiner
FW	ENG	Ron Simpson
FW	SCO	Jimmy Watson

== Review ==
After losing their first 3 matches, Town went on an impressive run of just 1 defeat in 12 matches, which included wins over Chelsea, Wolverhampton Wanderers and Portsmouth, the teams who would eventually be the top 3 at the end of the season. Other interesting results during the season were a 5–3 win over Arsenal at Highbury and a 6–4 defeat by Wolverhampton Wanderers at Molineux.

Jimmy Glazzard's 32 goals made him the top scorer in Division 1, but a depressing spell between mid-December and early April which saw Town fail to register a win in the league saw Town drop out of the top 5 of the table. However, Town's form in the FA Cup didn't reflect their league form, as they reached the sixth round for the first time since the 1938–39 season, before losing to Newcastle United in a replay at St James' Park. In the league they finished 12th with 41 points.

== Squad at the end of the season ==
Note: Flags indicate national team as defined under FIFA eligibility rules; some limited exceptions apply. Players may hold more than one non-FIFA nationality.

Pos.	Nation	Player
GK	ENG	Harry Mills
GK	ENG	Jack Wheeler
DF	ENG	John Battye
DF	ENG	Jack Connor
DF	ENG	Brian Gibson
DF	ENG	Laurie Kelly
DF	ENG	Bill McGarry
DF	ENG	Len Quested
DF	ENG	Ken Taylor
MF	NIR	Gerry Burrell

Pos.	Nation	Player
MF	SCO	Willie Davie
MF	ENG	Albert Hobson
MF	ENG	Vic Metcalfe
FW	ENG	Tommy Cavanagh
FW	ENG	Bryan Frear
FW	ENG	Jimmy Glazzard
FW	ENG	Roy Shiner
FW	ENG	Ron Simpson
FW	SCO	Jimmy Watson

== Results ==
=== Division One ===
Date	Opponents	Home/ Away	Result F–A	Scorers	Attendance	Position
21 August 1954	Blackpool	H	1–3	Metcalfe (pen)	35,793	18th
25 August 1954	Portsmouth	A	2–4	Pickett (og), Watson	35,873	18th
28 August 1954	Charlton Athletic	A	1–2	Burrell	22,422	21st
30 August 1954	Portsmouth	H	2–1	Watson, Metcalfe	22,688	18th
4 September 1954	Bolton Wanderers	H	2–0	Metcalfe, Cavanagh	28,726	14th
6 September 1954	Sheffield Wednesday	A	1–4	Glazzard	25,825	18th
11 September 1954	Cardiff City	A	1–1	Watson	21,840	17th
13 September 1954	Sheffield Wednesday	H	3–0	Metcalfe (pen), Glazzard (2)	20,570	12th
18 September 1954	Manchester United	A	1–1	Cavanagh	45,648	13th
25 September 1954	Wolverhampton Wanderers	H	2–0	Burrell, Cavanagh	30,861	12th
2 October 1954	Aston Villa	A	0–0		20,435	13th
9 October 1954	Chelsea	H	1–0	Cavanagh	29,556	11th
16 October 1954	Leicester City	A	3–1	Burrell, Glazzard, Cavanagh	30,491	10th
23 October 1954	Everton	H	2–1	Watson, Glazzard	27,390	7th
30 October 1954	Manchester City	A	4–2	Glazzard (3), Watson	34,246	4th
6 November 1954	Sheffield United	H	1–2	Glazzard	20,664	6th
13 November 1954	Arsenal	A	5–3	McGarry, Watson, Glazzard (2), Metcalfe	42,950	4th
20 November 1954	West Bromwich Albion	H	3–3	Glazzard, Watson, Quested	28,372	5th
27 November 1954	Newcastle United	A	2–2	Watson, Burrell	36,409	4th
4 December 1954	Burnley	H	0–1		17,392	7th
11 December 1954	Preston North End	A	3–2	Glazzard, Forbes (og), Cavanagh	23,774	5th
18 December 1954	Blackpool	A	1–1	Glazzard	17,579	6th
25 December 1954	Sunderland	A	1–1	Burrell	39,900	6th
27 December 1954	Sunderland	H	1–1	Metcalfe (pen)	47,450	6th
1 January 1955	Charlton Athletic	H	0–0		26,996	7th
5 February 1955	Manchester United	H	1–3	Glazzard	31,408	9th
12 February 1955	Wolverhampton Wanderers	A	4–6	Glazzard (3), Frear	30,666	10th
23 February 1955	Aston Villa	H	1–2	Glazzard	5,287	10th
26 February 1955	Chelsea	A	1–4	Burrell	35,786	11th
5 March 1955	Preston North End	H	0–4		24,929	15th
19 March 1955	Manchester City	H	0–0		31,065	17th
23 March 1955	Everton	A	0–4		15,561	17th
26 March 1955	Sheffield United	A	2–2	Glazzard, Coldwell (og)	11,951	18th
2 April 1955	Arsenal	H	0–1		22,853	18th
9 April 1955	Burnley	A	1–1	Glazzard	22,214	20th
11 April 1955	Tottenham Hotspur	A	1–1	Hopkins (og)	23,332	20th
12 April 1955	Tottenham Hotspur	H	1–0	Frear	23,580	16th
16 April 1955	Newcastle United	H	2–0	Glazzard (2)	21,913	14th
23 April 1955	West Bromwich Albion	A	1–2	Glazzard	18,661	17th
27 April 1955	Bolton Wanderers	A	0–1		16,184	17th
30 April 1955	Leicester City	H	3–1	Glazzard, Watson (2)	16,498	16th
2 May 1955	Cardiff City	H	2–0	Glazzard, Watson	10,476	12th

=== FA Cup ===
Date	Round	Opponents	Home/ Away	Result F–A	Scorers	Attendance
8 January 1955	Round 3	Coventry City	H	3–3	Glazzard (2), Watson	31,576
13 January 1955	Round 3 Replay	Coventry City	A	2 – 1 (aet: 90 mins: 1–1)	Glazzard, Watson	23,716
29 January 1955	Round 4	Torquay United	A	1–0	Glazzard	21,908
19 February 1955	Round 5	Liverpool	A	2–0	Hobson, Glazzard	57,115
12 March 1955	Round 6	Newcastle United	H	1–1	Glazzard	54,960
16 March 1955	Round 6 Replay	Newcastle United	A	0 – 2 (aet: 90 mins: 0–0)		52,380

== Appearances and goals ==
Name	Nationality	Position	League		FA Cup		Total	
Name	Nationality	Position	Apps	Goals	Apps	Goals	Apps	Goals
John Battye	England	DF	6	0	0	0	6	0
Gerry Burrell	Northern Ireland	MF	36	6	1	0	37	6
Tommy Cavanagh	England	FW	24	6	3	0	27	6
Jack Connor	England	DF	5	0	0	0	5	0
Willie Davie	Scotland	FW	6	0	1	0	7	0
Bryan Frear	England	FW	11	2	2	0	13	2
Brian Gibson	England	DF	14	0	1	0	15	0
Jimmy Glazzard	England	FW	42	26	6	6	48	32
Albert Hobson	England	MF	6	0	5	1	11	1
Laurie Kelly	England	DF	41	0	6	0	47	0
Don McEvoy	England	DF	6	0	0	0	6	0
Bill McGarry	England	DF	32	1	6	0	38	1
Vic Metcalfe	England	MF	35	6	6	0	41	6
Len Quested	England	DF	42	1	6	0	48	1
Roy Shiner	England	FW	1	0	0	0	1	0
Ron Simpson	England	FW	7	0	0	0	7	0
Ron Staniforth	England	DF	28	0	5	0	33	0
Ken Taylor	England	DF	36	0	6	0	42	0
Jimmy Watson	Scotland	MF	42	11	6	2	48	13
Jack Wheeler	England	GK	42	0	6	0	48	0
