= 1950–51 Huddersfield Town A.F.C. season =

Huddersfield Town
1950–51 season
- Chairman: Haydn Battye
- Manager: George Stephenson
- Stadium: Leeds Road
- Football League First Division: 19th
- FA Cup: Fifth round (eliminated by Wolverhampton Wanderers)
- Top goalscorer: League: Harold Hassall (18); All: Harold Hassall (18)
- Highest home attendance: 52,479 vs Blackpool (7 April 1951)
- Lowest home attendance: 11,537 vs Sunderland (7 March 1951)
- Biggest win: 4–1 vs Liverpool (31 March 1951)
- Biggest defeat: 0–8 vs Middlesbrough (30 September 1950)
Home colours

Huddersfield Town's 1950–51 campaign continued Town's post-war form of narrowly surviving relegation to Division Two. They finished in 19th place, just four points clear of the three teams below them, Chelsea, who survived relegation and the unlucky twosome of Sheffield Wednesday and Everton.

== Squad at the start of the season ==
Note: Flags indicate national team as defined under FIFA eligibility rules; some limited exceptions apply. Players may hold more than one non-FIFA nationality.

Pos.	Nation	Player
GK	ENG	Harry Mills
GK	ENG	Jack Wheeler
DF	ENG	John Battye
DF	ENG	Eddie Boot
DF	NIR	Charlie Gallogly
DF	ENG	George Hepplewhite
DF	ENG	George Howe
DF	ENG	Jack Howe
DF	ENG	Donald Hunter
DF	ENG	Don McEvoy
DF	ENG	Lol Morgan

Pos.	Nation	Player
DF	ENG	Henry Stewart
MF	SCO	Ian Duthie
MF	NIR	Johnny McKenna
MF	ENG	Vic Metcalfe
FW	ENG	Ronnie Burke
FW	ENG	Jimmy Glazzard
FW	ENG	Harold Hassall
FW	ENG	Albert Nightingale
FW	ENG	Conway Smith
FW	ENG	Jeff Taylor

== Review ==
Since the end of World War II, Town's form was more relegation than championship-winning form. However, Town's form at the start of the season was impressive with 5 wins in their first 7 games. Following that, Town's form made a rapid spiral downwards with a dreadful 6–2 loss against Arsenal and an even worse 8–0 defeat by Middlesbrough. Town's form would eventually improve following the defensive purchases of Bill McGarry and Laurie Kelly. Between December and mid-March, Town would only win 2 matches, oddly enough both away from home at Burnley and Aston Villa.

Town were in dire straits by the end of the season, but an amazing run of form saw Town record impressive wins over would-be champions Tottenham Hotspur and 3rd placed Blackpool. A 6–0 defeat by Manchester United right at the end made no difference to Town's fate, with the Terriers just surviving yet again. They finished in 19th place, just 4 points clear of the 3 teams below them, Chelsea, who survived relegation and the unlucky twosome of Sheffield Wednesday and Everton.

== Squad at the end of the season ==
Note: Flags indicate national team as defined under FIFA eligibility rules; some limited exceptions apply. Players may hold more than one non-FIFA nationality.

Pos.	Nation	Player
GK	ENG	Harry Mills
GK	ENG	Jack Wheeler
DF	ENG	John Battye
DF	ENG	Eddie Boot
DF	NIR	Charlie Gallogly
DF	ENG	George Howe
DF	ENG	Jack Howe
DF	ENG	Donald Hunter
DF	ENG	Laurie Kelly
DF	ENG	Don McEvoy
DF	ENG	Bill McGarry
DF	ENG	Lol Morgan
DF	ENG	Colin Senior

Pos.	Nation	Player
DF	ENG	Henry Stewart
MF	RSA	Jackie Carr
MF	SCO	Ian Duthie
MF	SCO	Alistair Gunn
MF	NIR	Johnny McKenna
MF	ENG	Vic Metcalfe
MF	ENG	Ernest Womersley
FW	ENG	Ronnie Burke
FW	ENG	Jimmy Glazzard
FW	ENG	Harold Hassall
FW	ENG	Albert Nightingale
FW	ENG	Jeff Taylor

== Results ==
=== Division One ===
Date	Opponents	Home/ Away	Result F–A	Scorers	Attendance	Position
19 August 1950	Everton	A	2–3	Taylor (2)	51,768	14th
23 August 1950	Stoke City	H	3–1	Smith, Boot, Hassall	16,075	9th
26 August 1950	Portsmouth	H	2–1	Hassall, Taylor	28,087	7th
28 August 1950	Stoke City	A	1–0	Hassall	21,780	1st
2 September 1950	Chelsea	A	2–1	Taylor, Hepplewhite	41,112	2nd
6 September 1950	Newcastle United	A	0–6		34,031	6th
9 September 1950	Burnley	H	3–1	Cummings (og), Metcalfe (pen), Nightingale	30,664	3rd
13 September 1950	Newcastle United	H	0–0		30,343	4th
16 September 1950	Arsenal	A	2–6	Metcalfe, Nightingale	54,200	7th
23 September 1950	Sheffield Wednesday	H	3–4	Nightingale, Hassall, Metcalfe	28,645	9th
30 September 1950	Middlesbrough	A	0–8		32,401	11th
7 October 1950	Sunderland	A	0–0		33,571	9th
14 October 1950	Aston Villa	H	4–2	Taylor (2), Hassall (2)	25,903	7th
21 October 1950	Fulham	A	1–1	Hassall	36,000	9th
28 October 1950	Bolton Wanderers	H	0–4		30,989	10th
4 November 1950	Derby County	A	0–3		21,593	13th
11 November 1950	Liverpool	H	2–2	Glazzard, Battye	25,229	13th
18 November 1950	Blackpool	A	1–3	Glazzard	19,724	15th
25 November 1950	Tottenham Hotspur	H	3–2	Glazzard, Hassall, Metcalfe	39,519	12th
2 December 1950	Charlton Athletic	A	2–3	Hassall, Croker (og)	19,605	15th
9 December 1950	Manchester United	H	2–3	Metcalfe (pen), Taylor	26,845	15th
16 December 1950	Everton	H	1–2	Glazzard	12,253	16th
23 December 1950	Portsmouth	A	0–1		22,411	16th
25 December 1950	Wolverhampton Wanderers	H	1–2	Hunter	24,952	18th
26 December 1950	Wolverhampton Wanderers	A	1–3	Hassall	40,838	20th
13 January 1951	Burnley	A	1–0	Glazzard	22,371	20th
20 January 1951	Arsenal	H	2–2	Glazzard, Hassall	37,175	18th
3 February 1951	Sheffield Wednesday	A	2–3	Taylor, Hassall	40,805	20th
17 February 1951	Middlesbrough	H	2–3	Hassall, Senior	23,533	20th
3 March 1951	Aston Villa	A	1–0	McKenna	34,882	19th
7 March 1951	Sunderland	H	3–4	Metcalfe (pen), Hassall, Glazzard	11,537	19th
10 March 1951	Fulham	H	1–2	Nightingale	19,651	19th
17 March 1951	Bolton Wanderers	A	0–4		29,796	20th
24 March 1951	Derby County	H	2–0	Nightingale, Taylor	25,573	19th
26 March 1951	West Bromwich Albion	A	2–0	Metcalfe, Hassall	24,360	19th
27 March 1951	West Bromwich Albion	H	1–2	Glazzard	32,401	19th
31 March 1951	Liverpool	A	4–1	Hassall, Spicer (og), Glazzard, Metcalfe	27,915	18th
7 April 1951	Blackpool	H	2–1	Taylor, Hassall	52,479	19th
14 April 1951	Tottenham Hotspur	A	2–0	Glazzard, Nightingale	55,014	18th
18 April 1951	Chelsea	H	2–1	Glazzard, Hassall	23,995	16th
21 April 1951	Charlton Athletic	H	1–1	Taylor	24,109	17th
28 April 1951	Manchester United	A	0–6		25,560	18th

=== FA Cup ===
Date	Round	Opponents	Home/ Away	Result F–A	Scorers	Attendance
6 January 1951	Round 3	Tottenham Hotspur	H	2–0	Taylor, Glazzard	25,390
27 January 1951	Round 4	Preston North End	A	2–0	Metcalfe (pen), Taylor	39,552
10 February 1951	Round 5	Wolverhampton Wanderers	A	0–2		52,708

== Appearances and goals ==
Name	Nationality	Position	League		FA Cup		Total	
Name	Nationality	Position	Apps	Goals	Apps	Goals	Apps	Goals
John Battye	England	DF	22	1	3	0	25	1
Eddie Boot	England	DF	37	1	2	0	39	1
Ronnie Burke	England	FW	2	0	0	0	2	0
Jackie Carr	South Africa	MF	1	0	0	0	1	0
Charlie Gallogly	Northern Ireland	DF	30	0	1	0	31	0
Jimmy Glazzard	England	FW	18	11	2	1	20	12
Alistair Gunn	Scotland	MF	3	0	1	0	4	0
Harold Hassall	England	FW	40	18	3	0	43	18
George Hepplewhite	England	DF	19	1	2	0	21	1
George Howe	England	DF	4	0	0	0	4	0
Jack Howe	England	DF	9	0	0	0	9	0
Donald Hunter	England	DF	6	1	0	0	6	1
Laurie Kelly	England	DF	30	0	3	0	33	0
Don McEvoy	England	DF	25	0	3	0	28	0
Bill McGarry	England	DF	10	0	0	0	10	0
Johnny McKenna	Northern Ireland	MF	28	1	0	0	28	1
Vic Metcalfe	England	MF	41	8	3	1	44	9
Harry Mills	England	GK	18	0	0	0	18	0
Lol Morgan	England	DF	1	0	0	0	1	0
Albert Nightingale	England	MF	34	6	3	0	37	6
Colin Senior	England	DF	5	1	1	0	6	1
Conway Smith	England	MF	8	1	0	0	8	1
Henry Stewart	England	DF	11	0	0	0	11	0
Jeff Taylor	England	FW	34	11	3	2	37	13
Jack Wheeler	England	GK	24	0	3	0	27	0
Ernest Womersley	England	MF	2	0	0	0	2	0
