= 1956–57 Huddersfield Town A.F.C. season =

Huddersfield Town
1956–57 season
- Chairman: J. Bernard Newman
- Manager: Andy Beattie (until 3 November 1956); Bill Shankly (from 5 November 1956)
- Stadium: Leeds Road
- Football League Second Division: 12th
- FA Cup: Fifth round (eliminated by Burnley)
- Top goalscorer: League: Dave Hickson (19); All: Dave Hickson (22)
- Highest home attendance: 55,168 vs Burnley (16 February 1957)
- Lowest home attendance: 5,878 vs West Ham United (23 February 1957)
- Biggest win: 5–0 vs Barnsley (10 November 1956)
- Biggest defeat: 2–7 vs Middlesbrough (22 April 1957)

Huddersfield Town's 1956–57 campaign was a fairly poor season for the Town under Andy Beattie and then his assistant Bill Shankly, following the previous season's relegation from Division 1. They finished in 12th place with 42 points, 12 points behind 2nd placed Nottingham Forest, but only 12 points ahead of 20th placed Notts County.

== Squad at the start of the season ==
Note: Flags indicate national team as defined under FIFA eligibility rules; some limited exceptions apply. Players may hold more than one non-FIFA nationality.

Pos.	Nation	Player
GK	ENG	Harry Fearnley
GK	RSA	Sandy Kennon
DF	ENG	John Battye
DF	ENG	Ron Cockerill
DF	ENG	John Coddington
DF	ENG	Jack Connor
DF	ENG	Tony Conwell
DF	ENG	Brian Gibson
DF	ENG	Laurie Kelly
DF	ENG	Bill McGarry
DF	ENG	Len Quested

Pos.	Nation	Player
DF	ENG	Ken Taylor
DF	ENG	Ray Wilson
MF	SCO	Willie Davie
MF	ENG	Bob Ledger
MF	ENG	Jackie Marriott
MF	ENG	Vic Metcalfe
FW	ENG	Bryan Frear
FW	ENG	Dave Hickson
FW	ENG	Ron Simpson
FW	SCO	Jimmy Watson

== Review ==
Following the previous season's relegation from Division 1, Andy Beattie tried to get Town back into the 1st Division at the first attempt. A mixed start to the season saw Town gain some memorable wins including an opening day 3–2 win at Anfield over Liverpool. Beattie resigned in early November and was replaced by his assistant Bill Shankly, who would then lead Liverpool to greatness in the 1960s and 1970s. Memorable wins during the season for Town were a 5–0 away win at Barnsley and a 6–2 win over West Ham United, where defender Ken Taylor, playing as an emergency striker, scored 4 goals.

This season also marked the debuts of Town's future stalwarts Kevin McHale and Les Massie and future British transfer record holder Denis Law. Law broke the record for the youngest player ever to make a first-team appearance when he came on at the age of 16 years, 303 days, beating McHale's record by 26 days, which he set earlier in the season.

Town also had a good run in the FA Cup, where they reached the fifth round, before bowing out to Burnley in a 2–1 defeat in front of over 55,000 fans at Leeds Road. Town finished the league season in 12th position with 44 points, but it would be nearly 15 years until Town returned to the big time.

== Squad at the end of the season ==
Note: Flags indicate national team as defined under FIFA eligibility rules; some limited exceptions apply. Players may hold more than one non-FIFA nationality.

Pos.	Nation	Player
GK	ENG	Tom Daley
GK	ENG	Harry Fearnley
GK	RSA	Sandy Kennon
DF	ENG	John Battye
DF	ENG	Ron Cockerill
DF	ENG	John Coddington
DF	ENG	Jack Connor
DF	ENG	Tony Conwell
DF	ENG	Brian Gibson
DF	ENG	Laurie Kelly
DF	ENG	Bill McGarry
DF	ENG	Len Quested

Pos.	Nation	Player
DF	ENG	Ken Taylor
DF	ENG	Ray Wilson
MF	SCO	Willie Davie
MF	ENG	Bob Ledger
MF	ENG	Jackie Marriott
MF	ENG	Kevin McHale
MF	ENG	Vic Metcalfe
FW	ENG	Dave Hickson
FW	SCO	Denis Law
FW	SCO	Les Massie
FW	ENG	Ron Simpson
FW	SCO	Jimmy Watson

== Results ==
=== Division Two ===
Date	Opponents	Home/ Away	Result F – A	Scorers	Attendance	Position
18 August 1956	Liverpool	A	3–2	Simpson, Hickson, Davie	49,344	7th
20 August 1956	Leicester City	H	1–2	Simpson	18,978	8th
25 August 1956	Leyton Orient	H	3–0	Metcalfe (pen), Hickson, Watson	15,164	7th
29 August 1956	Leicester City	A	2–2	Hickson, McHale	28,301	6th
1 September 1956	Fulham	A	0–1		17,606	9th
3 September 1956	Bristol Rovers	H	2–1	Hickson (2)	14,560	5th
8 September 1956	Bury	A	3–1	Hickson (2), Frear	17,434	4th
10 September 1956	Bristol Rovers	A	0–4		27,553	5th
15 September 1956	Grimsby Town	H	2–1	Frear, McHale	18,312	5th
22 September 1956	Doncaster Rovers	A	0–4		19,754	9th
29 September 1956	Stoke City	H	2–2	Hickson, McHale	16,202	8th
6 October 1956	Nottingham Forest	H	1–0	Hickson	17,600	7th
13 October 1956	West Ham United	A	2–0	Marriott, Hickson	22,643	6th
20 October 1956	Lincoln City	H	0–1		16,999	8th
27 October 1956	Bristol City	A	1–2	Hickson	24,873	9th
3 November 1956	Sheffield United	H	1–4	Hickson	18,853	10th
10 November 1956	Barnsley	A	5–0	Hickson, Massie, Marriott, Simpson (2)	15,234	9th
17 November 1956	Port Vale	H	3–1	Marriott, Sproson (og), Hickson	14,044	8th
24 November 1956	Rotherham United	A	3–3	Hickson, Metcalfe, Quested	12,977	8th
1 December 1956	Blackburn Rovers	H	0–2		14,418	10th
8 December 1956	Swansea Town	A	2–4	Simpson (2)	13,781	12th
15 December 1956	Liverpool	H	0–3		11,577	13th
22 December 1956	Leyton Orient	A	1–3	Metcalfe (pen)	14,725	14th
24 December 1956	Notts County	A	2–1	Simpson (2)	9,165	12th
26 December 1956	Notts County	H	3–0	Hickson, Connor, Law	7,483	12th
29 December 1956	Fulham	H	1–1	Hickson	16,503	12th
12 January 1957	Bury	H	1–2	Metcalfe (pen)	16,282	13th
19 January 1957	Grimsby Town	A	2–1	Simpson (2)	14,929	12th
2 February 1957	Doncaster Rovers	H	0–1		17,888	13th
9 February 1957	Stoke City	A	1–5	Hickson	27,503	14th
21 February 1957	Nottingham Forest	A	0–0		14,754	13th
23 February 1957	West Ham United	H	6–2	Taylor (4), Massie, McGarry	5,878	13th
2 March 1957	Lincoln City	A	2–1	McGarry, Massie	9,917	12th
9 March 1957	Bristol City	H	2–1	Taylor, Metcalfe (pen)	14,218	11th
16 March 1957	Sheffield United	A	0–2		19,038	12th
23 March 1957	Barnsley	H	2–0	Simpson, Conwell	16,772	11th
30 March 1957	Port Vale	A	2–1	Massie, Taylor	10,500	11th
6 April 1957	Rotherham United	H	1–0	Taylor	13,008	9th
13 April 1957	Blackburn Rovers	A	2–3	Taylor, Woods (og)	24,181	10th
20 April 1957	Swansea Town	H	2–2	Law, Simpson	13,516	11th
22 April 1957	Middlesbrough	A	2–7	Hickson, Massie	20,651	12th
23 April 1957	Middlesbrough	H	0–1		13,818	12th

=== FA Cup ===
Date	Round	Opponents	Home/ Away	Result F – A	Scorers	Attendance
5 January 1957	Round 3	Sheffield United	H	0–0		24,220
7 January 1957	Round 3 Replay	Sheffield United	A	1–1	Simpson	25,537
14 January 1957	Round 3 2nd Replay	Sheffield United	N	2–1	Quested, Hickson	12,270
26 January 1957	Round 4	Peterborough United	H	3–1	Law, Hickson, Simpson	48,735
16 February 1957	Round 5	Burnley	H	1–2	Hickson	55,168

== Appearances and goals ==
Name	Nationality	Position	League		FA Cup		Total	
Name	Nationality	Position	Apps	Goals	Apps	Goals	Apps	Goals
Ron Cockerill	England	DF	20	0	5	0	25	0
Jack Connor	England	DF	10	1	4	0	14	1
Tony Conwell	England	DF	31	1	5	0	36	1
Tom Daley	England	GK	1	0	0	0	1	0
Willie Davie	Scotland	FW	5	1	0	0	5	1
Harry Fearnley	England	GK	21	0	5	0	26	0
Bryan Frear	England	FW	4	2	0	0	4	2
Brian Gibson	England	DF	29	0	5	0	34	0
Dave Hickson	England	FW	28	19	5	3	33	22
Laurie Kelly	England	DF	11	0	0	0	11	0
Sandy Kennon	South Africa	GK	20	0	0	0	20	0
Denis Law	Scotland	MF	13	2	5	1	18	3
Jackie Marriott	England	MF	11	3	0	0	11	3
Les Massie	Scotland	FW	16	5	0	0	16	5
Bill McGarry	England	DF	35	2	1	0	36	2
Kevin McHale	England	MF	27	3	5	0	32	3
Vic Metcalfe	England	MF	42	5	5	0	47	5
Len Quested	England	DF	41	1	5	1	46	2
Ron Simpson	England	FW	34	12	5	2	39	14
Ken Taylor	England	DF	33	8	0	0	33	8
Jimmy Watson	Scotland	MF	17	1	0	0	17	1
Ray Wilson	England	DF	13	0	0	0	13	0
