= Leslie Wood (footballer) =

English footballer

Personal information
- Full name: Thomas Leslie Wood
- Date of birth: 20 December 1932
- Place of birth: Haslingden, England
- Date of death: 24 January 2005 (aged 72)
- Place of death: Manchester, England
- Position: Goalkeeper

Youth career
- Woolfold St. James

Senior career*
Years	Team	Apps	(Gls)
	Bolton Wanderers	0	(0)
1952–1955	Huddersfield Town	0	(0)
1955–1956	Barrow	31	(0)
1956–1958	Port Vale	2	(0)
1958	Southport	1	(0)
- Rossendale United
- Bolton Road
Total		33+	(0+)
- * Club domestic league appearances and goals

Thomas Leslie Wood (20 December 1932 – 24 January 2005) was an English footballer. A goalkeeper, he played 33 league games in the Football League, mostly for Barrow. He was also signed to Bolton Wanderers, Huddersfield Town, Port Vale, and Southport.

== Career ==
Wood played for Woolfold St. James and Bolton Wanderers before joining Huddersfield Town in 1952. The "Terriers" won promotion to the First Division in 1952–53, and made a bid for the Football League title in 1953–54, before falling away in 1954–55. However, manager Andy Beattie was satisfied with the services of regular goalkeepers Harry Mills and Jack Wheeler, and Wood never made his first-team debut at Leeds Road.

Wood spent the 1955–56 season with Barrow, and played 31 Third Division North games for Joe Harvey's struggling "Bluebirds". He left Holker Street and joined Freddie Steele's Second Division side Port Vale for 'a reasonable fee' in June 1956. Working as Ray King's understudy, Wood conceded three goals on his debut against Blackburn Rovers at Vale Park on 12 January 1957. He played just one more game in 1956–57, and was transferred to Southport in January 1958 by new boss Norman Low. He played one Third Division North game for a struggling "Sandgrounders" side in 1957–58. After leaving Haig Avenue, he later turned out for non-League sides Rossendale United and Bolton Road.

== Career statistics ==
Appearances and goals by club, season and competition
Club	Season	League			FA Cup		Total	
Club	Season	Division	Apps	Goals	Apps	Goals	Apps	Goals
Barrow	1955–56	Third Division North	31	0	3	0	34	0
Port Vale	1956–57	Second Division	2	0	0	0	2	0
Port Vale	1957–58	Third Division South	0	0	0	0	0	0
Port Vale	Total		2	0	0	0	2	0
Southport	1957–58	Third Division North	1	0	0	0	1	0
