= Bill McGarry =

English footballer (1927–2005)

Personal information
- Full name: William Harry McGarry
- Date of birth: 10 June 1927
- Place of birth: Stoke-on-Trent, Staffordshire, England
- Date of death: 15 March 2005 (aged 77)
- Place of death: Bophuthatswana, South Africa
- Height: 5 ft 8 in (1.73 m)
- Position: Right-half

Youth career
- Northwood Mission

Senior career*
Years	Team	Apps	(Gls)
1945–1951	Port Vale	148	(5)
1951–1961	Huddersfield Town	363	(25)
1961–1963	Bournemouth & Boscombe Athletic	78	(2)
Total		589	(32)

International career
1954	England "B"	1	(0)
1954–1955	England	4	(0)
	Football League	1	(0)

Managerial career
- 1961–1963: Bournemouth & Boscombe Athletic (player-manager)
- 1963–1964: Watford
- 1964–1968: Ipswich Town
- 1968–1976: Wolverhampton Wanderers
- 1976–1977: Saudi Arabia
- 1977–1980: Newcastle United
- 198?–198?: Power Dynamos
- 1982–1983: Zambia
- 1985: Wolverhampton Wanderers
- * Club domestic league appearances and goals

William Harry McGarry (10 June 1927 – 15 March 2005) was an English football player and manager who spent 40 years in the professional game. He had a reputation for toughness, both as a player and as a manager.

A right-half as a player, he joined Port Vale following the end of World War II and spent the next six years with the club. He then moved on to Huddersfield Town in 1951, where he would spend the next ten years of his career. He was an ever-present as Town won promoted out of the Second Division in 1952–53. He retired in 1963 after two years as Bournemouth & Boscombe Athletic's player-manager. He scored 33 goals in 617 league and cup games in an 18-year career in the Football League. After winning one England "B" cap in 1954, he went on to win four senior England caps.

He also found success as a manager, moving from Bournemouth to Watford in 1963; he was appointed as Ipswich Town manager the following year. There, he led the club to the Second Division championship in 1967–68 before moving on to the vacant position at Wolverhampton Wanderers later in 1968. He spent eight years with "Wolves", leading them to the UEFA Cup final in 1972 and League Cup glory in 1974. He became an international manager with Saudi Arabia in 1976, only to return to the domestic game with Newcastle United the following year. He failed to find success at Newcastle and left the club in 1980 before finding work in Zambia with Power Dynamos. He spent two months as Wolves manager in 1985 before leaving his management career behind him. After a long battle against illness, he died on 15 March 2005, aged 77. He had one son and one daughter.

== Early and personal life ==
William Harry McGarry was born on 10 June 1927 in Stoke-on-Trent, Staffordshire to Ralph and Ethel (née Vernon). He later married Constance Dale in 1950.

== Club career ==
McGarry began his career at local non-League club Northwood Mission, based in Hanley, before joining David Pratt's Port Vale as an amateur in April 1945, signing professional forms in June of that year. He was handed his debut by Billy Frith at the Old Recreation Ground on boxing day 1945, in a 1–0 defeat by Walsall. Under Gordon Hodgson's stewardship, he played seven Third Division South games in the 1946–47 season. He forced his way into the first XI by November 1947 and scored his first goal on boxing day in a 5–0 win over Brighton & Hove Albion. He played a total of 27 games in the 1947–48 campaign. He featured 41 times in the 1948–49 season, scoring one goal against Torquay United. He was an ever-present throughout the 46 game 1949–50 season, and found the net once on the final day of the season, in a 2–1 defeat to Ipswich Town at Portman Road. He played 35 games in the 1950–51 season, and scored in games away at Millwall and Torquay, before he was sold to First Division side Huddersfield Town for a £12,000 fee in March 1951.

"Terriers" manager George Stephenson bought McGarry to play in a defensive partnership with Laurie Kelly. He built a reputation as a tough-tackling, sturdy wing-half, and featured ten times towards the end of the 1950–51 season. He then scored twice in 43 games in 1951–52, as Huddersfield suffered relegation. New boss Andy Beattie led the club to immediate promoted out of the Second Division with a second-place finish in 1952–53. McGarry played all 44 games in an extremely settled defence that featured himself, Kelly, Don McEvoy, Len Quested, Ron Staniforth, and goalkeeper Jack Wheeler; remarkably, the six men played every minute of the campaign, and had the best defensive record in the Football League with just 33 goals conceded in 42 league games. Town's solid defence then helped them to finish third in the top-flight in 1953–54, just six points behind champions Wolverhampton Wanderers; McGarry was again an ever-present, scoring four goals in 43 appearances. He scored once in 38 games in 1954–55, as Town posted a 12th-place finish. He then scored four goals in 41 games in 1955–56, as their once solid defence leaked goals and cost them relegation as they finished below 20th place Aston Villa on goal average. Bill Shankly took charge at Leeds Road in November 1956 and took the club to 12th in the Second Division in 1956–57; he kept faith with McGarry, who scored twice in 36 appearances. He scored six goals in 36 games in 1957–58, as Huddersfield rose slightly to ninth place. His goal tally included a successfully converted penalty in the 7–6 defeat to Charlton Athletic at The Valley on 21 December; ten-man Charlton came back from 5–1 down in what The Guardian described as "the most remarkable comeback in football history". They then dropped down to 14th in 1958–59, with McGarry scoring four goals in 32 games. He scored once in 38 games in 1959–60; Town posted a sixth-place finish under new boss Eddie Boot, who took charge after Shankly left the club to manage Liverpool. McGarry scored once in 20 appearances in 1960–61, as Town dropped down to 20th place.

After a decade of service at Huddersfield Town, he headed south to become Bournemouth & Boscombe Athletic's first player-manager. He was signed for a £2,000 fee. He spent two years at Dean Court, scoring twice in 78 league games, before hanging up his boots and devoting himself to management.

== International career ==
McGarry's performances at Huddersfield won him first an England "B" appearance, and then a place in the England squad for the 1954 World Cup. Despite having never featured for the national team before, he played two of England's three games in the tournament (against hosts Switzerland and Uruguay). He won two further caps the following year in a 5–1 victory over Denmark and in a Home International 2–1 defeat by Wales. He also played for the Football League and went on the FA's 1956 South African tour.

== Style of play ==
Former teammate Roy Sproson said that: "he was everything that a manager could want in a player. Magnificently fit, Bill was aggressive, busy, good in the air and a player of tremendous enthusiasm for the game. He gave 100 per cent effort for all of 90 minutes" and that he also used to "underrate himself". Freddie Steele stated that "McGarry is a tough bugger. He wasn't born, you know – he was cast at Shelton Bar!".

== Managerial career ==
=== Bournemouth & Boscombe Athletic ===
His post as player-manager as Don Welsh's successor at Bournemouth & Boscombe Athletic in 1961 was the start of a long career in management for McGarry. He led the "Cherries" to a third-place finish in the Third Division in 1961–62, just three points behind promoted Grimsby Town. They went on to finish in fifth place in 1962–63, six points behind promoted Swindon Town, in his final season at Dean Court.

=== Watford ===
In July 1963, McGarry took the reins at Watford following the dismissal of Ron Burgess. He took the "Hornets" to third in the Third Division in 1963–64, his only full season in charge at Vicarage Road. They finished just two points behind Coventry City and Crystal Palace, who were both promoted.

=== Ipswich Town ===
McGarry left Watford (who appointed Ken Furphy in his place) to take charge at recently relegated Ipswich Town in October 1964, following Jackie Milburn's brief and unsuccessful tenure. He led the "Blues" to a fifth-place finish in the Second Division in 1964–65. However, they dropped to 15th place in 1965–66, before posting another fifth-place finish in 1966–67 after he signed proven forward Ray Crawford. He finally won promotion as a manager in 1967–68, when he took the Portman Road club back to the First Division. Ipswich won the Second Division title, though were only one point clear of third place Blackpool. One of McGarry's signings was Charlie Woods who later became coach at Ipswich Town.

=== Wolverhampton Wanderers ===
Just months into the 1968–69 campaign, he walked out on Ipswich (who appointed Bobby Robson in his stead) to take charge at fellow First Division club Wolverhampton Wanderers, who had just sacked his former teammate Ronnie Allen. He appointed Sammy Chung as his assistant, who he had previously taken on at Ipswich. He built a team around speedy winger Dave Wagstaffe, central midfield duo Mike Bailey and Kenny Hibbitt, and strike partners Derek Dougan and John Richards.

After a 16th-place finish in 1968–69, he took Wolves to 13th place in 1969–70 and then up to fourth place in 1970–71. They won the first-ever instalment of the Texaco Cup, in 1971, with a 3–2 victory over Heart of Midlothian. They dropped to ninth in the league in 1971–72, but went all the way to the UEFA Cup final, recording victories over Juventus and Ferencvárosi. They lost 2–1 to Tottenham Hotspur in the home leg of the final and could only manage a 1–1 draw at White Hart Lane, and were thereby denied European silverware.

They again qualified for Europe following a fifth-place finish in 1972–73, and McGarry also led the club to the semi-finals of both the FA Cup and League Cup. They were beaten 1–0 by Leeds United at Maine Road in the FA Cup and lost 4–3 on aggregate to Tottenham Hotspur in the League Cup. They dropped to 12th place in 1973–74, but finally won a major trophy after beating Manchester City 2–1 in the League Cup final at Wembley. He later admitted that he would have resigned had Wolves lost in the final. Wolves dropped back down to 12th in 1974–75, though they did record a 7–1 win over Chelsea at Molineux. However, the club suffered relegation at the end of the 1975–76 season, and McGarry was promptly fired after nearly eight years at the helm. He was replaced by long-time assistant Sammy Chung.

"The older players like Mike Bailey, Derek Dougan and Waggy [Dave Wagstaffe] were leaving and he tried to replace them like for like, but you couldn't do it. He tried to make Steve Kindon into a centre-forward but he wasn't a Dougan type of centre-forward. He brought in John Farley to be a Waggy and he wasn't that, and he never replaced Mike. If there was ever a criticism of McGarry, it was that he could not adapt his tactics to different players."

— Striker John Richards explains his theory as to McGarry's decline at Wolves.

=== Newcastle United via Saudi Arabia ===
He headed abroad and replaced Ferenc Puskás as coach of the Saudi Arabia national team, but soon returned to England. Port Vale tried to hire him after sacking Roy Sproson in October 1977, but he rejected their terms. He was appointed as manager of Newcastle United the following month, after Richard Dinnis's brief and unsuccessful reign at St James' Park. He gave Kenny Wharton his first professional contract, who would go on to play for the club for eleven years. He also signed Peter Withe, Alan Shoulder, and Bobby Shinton. He could not stop the "Magpies" from suffering relegation out of the First Division in the 1977–78 season. He could only take United to two mid-table finishes in the Second Division in 1978–79 and 1979–80, before he was fired just weeks into the 1980–81 season after his team were knocked out of the League Cup by Third Division club Bury. Arthur Cox was appointed as his successor.

=== Later career ===
McGarry then served in a variety of posts, with spells as a scout at Brighton & Hove Albion, Zambian Power Dynamos as a coach, the Zambia national team as manager and a period as a coach in South Africa. He returned to his former club, Wolves, in September 1985 but walked out after just 61 days after a fall-out with the Bhatti Brothers. After a spell outside the game, he returned to South Africa and coached in Bophuthatswana.

== Style of management ==
Journalist Pat Murphy described McGarry as a "fearsome character when crossed" who was a "hard taskmaster". Murphy and Alan Oliver both noted that McGarry could often give journalists a hard time. Former Wolves player Kenny Hibbitt said that "I didn't necessarily like him, but I respected him." He also instigated rules on players diet, long before the trend became standard practice within the footballing world.

== Career statistics ==
=== Club ===
Appearances and goals by club, season and competition
Club	Season	League			FA Cup		Total	
Club	Season	Division	Apps	Goals	Apps	Goals	Apps	Goals
Port Vale	1945–46	Third Division South	2	0	0	0	2	0
Port Vale	1946–47	Third Division South	7	0	0	0	7	0
Port Vale	1947–48	Third Division South	26	1	1	0	27	1
Port Vale	1948–49	Third Division South	40	1	1	0	41	1
Port Vale	1949–50	Third Division South	42	1	4	0	46	1
Port Vale	1950–51	Third Division South	31	2	4	0	35	2
Port Vale	Total		148	5	10	0	158	5
Huddersfield Town	1950–51	First Division	10	0	0	0	10	0
Huddersfield Town	1951–52	First Division	42	2	1	0	43	1
Huddersfield Town	1952–53	Second Division	42	1	2	0	44	1
Huddersfield Town	1953–54	First Division	42	4	1	0	43	4
Huddersfield Town	1954–55	First Division	32	1	6	0	38	1
Huddersfield Town	1955–56	First Division	40	4	1	0	41	4
Huddersfield Town	1956–57	Second Division	35	2	1	0	36	2
Huddersfield Town	1957–58	Second Division	34	6	2	0	36	6
Huddersfield Town	1958–59	Second Division	32	4	0	0	32	4
Huddersfield Town	1959–60	Second Division	35	0	3	1	38	1
Huddersfield Town	1960–61	Second Division	19	1	1	0	20	1
Huddersfield Town	Total		363	25	18	1	381	26
Bournemouth & Boscombe Athletic	1960–61	Third Division	8	0	0	0	8	0
Bournemouth & Boscombe Athletic	1961–62	Third Division	38	2	1	0	39	2
Bournemouth & Boscombe Athletic	1962–63	Third Division	32	0	1	0	33	0
Bournemouth & Boscombe Athletic	Total		78	2	2	0	80	2
Career total			589	32	30	1	619	33

=== International ===
Appearances and goals by national team and year
National team	Year	Apps	Goals
England	1954	2	0
England	1955	2	0
Total		4	0

== Managerial statistics ==
Managerial record by team and tenure
Team	From	To	Record				
Team	From	To	G	W	D	L	Win %
Bournemouth & Boscombe Athletic	March 1961	July 1963	112	47	38	27	41.96
Watford	July 1963	October 1964	68	29	21	18	42.65
Ipswich Town	October 1964	November 1968	181	76	58	47	41.99
Wolverhampton Wanderers	November 1968	May 1976	358	135	101	122	37.71
Newcastle United	November 1977	August 1980	118	37	33	48	31.36
Wolverhampton Wanderers	September 1985	November 1985	12	2	3	7	16.67
Total			849	326	254	269	38.40

Notes

- Statistics at Saudi Arabia, Power Dynamos & Zambia not known.

== Honours ==
=== Player ===
Huddersfield Town

- Football League Second Division second-place promotion: 1952–53

=== Manager ===
Ipswich Town

- Football League Second Division: 1967–68

Wolverhampton Wanderers

- Football League Cup: 1973–74
- Texaco Cup: 1971
- UEFA Cup runner-up: 1971–72
