= Henry Mills =

Henry Mills may refer to:

- Henry Mills (Once Upon a Time), a fictional character in the TV series Once Upon a Time
- Henry Mills (cricketer) (1847–1915), English cricketer
- Henry Mills (British politician) (1868–1928), member of London County Council
- Harry Mills (politician), Canadian politician
- Rev. Henry Mills, Bad Girls character
- Harry Mills (footballer) (1922–1990), English footballer
- Henry Mills, father of fictional firefighter Peter Mills (Chicago Fire)

== See also ==
- Harry Mills (disambiguation)
- Henry Milles, politician
- Henry Mill (1683–1771), inventor
