= Harry Mills =

Harry Mills may refer to:

- Brusher Mills (Harry Mills, 1840–1905), English hermit and snake catcher
- Harry Mills (politician) (1874–1959), Canadian locomotive engineer and politician
- Harry Mills (singer) (1913–1982), singer with The Mills Brothers
- Harry Mills (footballer) (1922–1990), former professional footballer

== See also ==
- Henry Mills (disambiguation)
