= Gary Quested =

Australian soccer player (born 1951)

Gary Quested (born April 1951) is an Australian former soccer player. Between 1968 and 1977 he played as a winger for Melita Eagles and Auburn in the top level of the NSW Soccer Federation. Born in England, he represented Australia on the tour to Vietnam in 1970.

== Life ==
Gary Quested is the son of the English professional association football player Len Quested and his Australian born wife Elsie. He was born in April 1951 when his father played for Fulham FC in the English Football League First Division. In mid 1957 Len Quested, his wife and their children Gary, then six, and Jacqueline, 3, migrated to Australia. After arrival in Sydney, Len Quested joined the Auburn football team in Western Sydney which played in the NSW first division and commenced a successful career in Australian "soccer".

Gary Quested went to Auburn Public School and in 1960 joined the juniors of the Auburn soccer club, which played after an amalgamation with Gladesville-Ryde between 1964 and 1967 as Cumberland United. His father coached the first grade team there in 1964 and between 1965 and In 1966 he played for the NSW Under 16 side.

In 1968 he played for NSW Division One club Melita Eagles which was formed by Maltese immigrants and was then based in the inner western suburb of Newtown. The side finished tenth in the league of 12 clubs.

In 1969 he moved back to Auburn, which had been newly promoted to the state's top flight.

In April 1970 Australian coach Joe Vlasits, who as coach of Melita Eagles also was instrumental in him joining that club, invited Quested to participate at the Friendship Cup in Saigon, South Vietnam. There he played alongside Johnny Warren, Manfred Schaefer, Peter Wilson and Adrian Alston against the Kowloon Bus Company from Hong Kong and a selection of the South Vietnamese Army. Australia pocketed the trophy with two wins. On the way back they also encountered a West Australian XI where Quested scored a goal in an 8–2 win.

After return, he broke down with knee issues which kept him out of Auburn's side. Nevertheless, by the end of the year he had the opportunity to travel to London to have a try-out with the Third Division club Fulham FC. After recurring knee issues he had to cut that short and spent a prolonged holiday in Europe before returning to Sydney in mid 1971. There it was decided that his cruciate ligaments in the left knee require an operation.

In July 1972, Quested, who "was rated one of Australia's most promising players" and described "as a clever, ball-playing winger with plenty of pace", made a comeback at Auburn's home ground Mona Vale against St. George-Budapest.

He apparently played soccer with Auburn until 1977. After 1975, when Auburn became fourth in the league and reached the play-offs for the first time in many years, where they were eliminated in the minor semifinal with 1–2 against Pan Hellenic, 1977 was the most successful season during Quested's stay with the club. It became third in the NSW Division One and reached the Grand Final where Croatia Sydney prevailed 2–0. But by that year the National Soccer League had commenced and five of the strongest Sydney sides played there.

Later Gary Quested became an ambitious hobby golfer who represented the Bowral Country Club in competitions.
