= Erling Meirik =

Norwegian footballer and football executive (born 1948)

Personal information
- Date of birth: 17 December 1948 (age 77)
- Place of birth: Levanger, Norway
- Position: Midfielder

Senior career*
Years	Team	Apps	(Gls)
1970–76	Rosenborg	123	(13)

International career
1972–1975	Norway	13	(0)
- * Club domestic league appearances and goals

Erling Meirik (born 17 December 1948) is a Norwegian former football and football executive. Born in Levanger, he played for Rosenborg between 1970 and 1976, being capped 134 times and scoring 14 goals. He was Rosenborg's top scorer in the 1970 season with five goals. He also represented the Norway national team on 13 occasions between 1972 and 1975. He was later hired as president of Rosenborg. He withdrew as president in 1983 as a consequence of the unsuccessful hiring of Tommy Cavanagh as manager.
