= Colin Senior =

English footballer

Personal information
- Date of birth: 3 June 1927
- Place of birth: Dewsbury, England
- Date of death: 9 January 2011 (aged 83)
- Place of death: Leicester, England
- Position: Defender

Senior career*
Years	Team	Apps	(Gls)
- Stocksbridge
1950–1951	Huddersfield Town	5	(1)
1951–1952	Accrington Stanley	27	(1)
1952–1953	Corby Town		
1953–1954	Peterborough United	24	(0)
- * Club domestic league appearances and goals

Colin Senior (3 June 1927 – 9 January 2011) was an English professional footballer who played as a defender for Huddersfield Town and Accrington Stanley in the Football League during the 1950s.
