= Ernest Womersley =

English footballer (1932–2018)

Personal information
- Date of birth: 28 August 1932
- Place of birth: Hartshead, England
- Date of death: 15 September 2018 (aged 86)
- Place of death: Cleckheaton, West Yorkshire, England
- Position: Midfielder

Senior career*
Years	Team	Apps	(Gls)
1950–1957	Huddersfield Town	2	(0)
	Bradford City	0	(0)
- * Club domestic league appearances and goals

Ernest Womersley ( 28 August 1932 – 15 September 2018) was a former professional footballer, who played for Huddersfield Town. He was born in Hartshead, West Yorkshire.
