= Ronald Humpston =

English footballer

Personal information
- Full name: Ronald Humpston
- Date of birth: 14 December 1924
- Place of birth: Derby, England
- Date of death: 4 January 2012 (aged 87)
- Place of death: Cheltenham, Gloucestershire, England
- Position: Goalkeeper

Senior career*
Years	Team	Apps	(Gls)
1947–1951	Portsmouth	9	(0)
1951–1952	Huddersfield Town	5	(0)
	Headington United	?	(?)
- * Club domestic league appearances and goals

Ronald Humpston (14 December 1924 – 4 January 2012) was a former professional footballer, who played for Portsmouth, Huddersfield Town & Headington United. He was born in Derby. He was manager of Gravesend and Northfleet from summer 1960 to November 1961.
