= Vic Metcalfe =

English footballer (1922–2003)

Personal information
- Full name: Victor Metcalfe
- Date of birth: 3 February 1922
- Place of birth: Barrow-in-Furness, Lancashire, England
- Date of death: 6 April 2003 (aged 81)
- Place of death: Huddersfield, England
- Position: Winger

Senior career*
| Years | Team | Apps | (Gls) |
| 1946–1958 | Huddersfield Town | 434 | (87) |
| 1958–1960 | Hull City | 6 | (3) |

International career
| 1951 | England | 2 | (0) |
- * Club domestic league appearances and goals

Victor Metcalfe (3 February 1922 – 6 April 2003) was an English professional footballer who played as a winger.

== Life and career ==
Metcalfe was born in Barrow-in-Furness where his father played rugby league for Barrow. He was though a product of West Riding schools football and joined Huddersfield Town from Ravensthorpe BC as an amateur in June 1940. He was immediately put into the first team, then playing in the Wartime League North-East Division. After service as a wireless operator in the RAF he signed as a professional in December 1945 and was a regular in the first team until leaving for Hull City in June 1958. He had made a total of 459 first team appearances and scored 90 goals. He played a few times for Hull in their promotion season 1958–59 and retired on his 38th birthday in February 1960.

After a year out of football he returned to Huddersfield to coach for three years then moved to a similar post at Halifax Town, at that time in the Third Division. In April 1966 he was promoted to manager and left there in November 1967 when Alan Ball, Sr was appointed.

He was a natural left-footed player and his position at outside left was essentially unchallenged during his twelve years of post-war football at Huddersfield, nine seasons in the First Division and three in the Second. He was known for his pace and shooting power (he was for a long time the team's penalty taker) and above all for the accuracy of his crosses from the wing. His partnership with centre forward Jimmy Glazzard accounted for a high proportion of Huddersfield's goals during that period. Most notable were the four crosses from which Glazzard scored in the 8–2 defeat of Everton in April 1953. Metcalfe himself scored in that match as did all the other members of the forward line.

In 1952–53 Huddersfield set a league record in that the entire defence (Wheeler; Staniforth, Kelly; McGarry, McEvoy, Quested) played unchanged throughout the season. Metcalfe also played, at outside left, in every match.

Representative honours for other wingers were hard to come by in the days of Stanley Matthews and Tom Finney, but Metcalfe won two caps for England against Portugal and against Argentina, both in May 1951; in both matches his club colleague Harold Hassall played at inside-left. In 1948 and 1949 he played for the FA against the RAF (scoring twice) and twice against the Army. He played for the Football League twice, in 1950 and 1954.

Metcalfe was also a useful cricketer. He played regularly at no. 4 for Broad Oak in the Huddersfield Cricket League. After retirement he continued to live in Huddersfield and died in 2003, aged 81. The nostalgia section of the Huddersfield Daily Examiner website has reports on a few of his matches.
