= Alan Oliver =

Alan Oliver is a sports journalist and former chief sports writer for the Evening Chronicle, based in Newcastle upon Tyne. He has written reports on Newcastle United since the 1980s.

He wrote an unofficial book about Kevin Keegan's time as manager of the club entitled Geordie Messiah.

On 28 December 2008, Oliver left the Newcastle Evening Chronicle to join The People.
