= Arthur Green (footballer, born 1928) =

English footballer

Personal information
- Date of birth: 28 April 1928
- Place of birth: Liverpool, England
- Date of death: 1992 (aged 63–64)
- Position: Defender

Senior career*
Years	Team	Apps	(Gls)
- Burscough
1951–1952	Huddersfield Town	3	(0)
- Burton Albion
- * Club domestic league appearances and goals

Arthur Green (born 28 April 1928 – 1992) was a professional footballer, who played for Burscough, Huddersfield Town and Burton Albion. He was born in Liverpool.
