= Cyril Lello =

English footballer

Personal information
- Full name: Cyril Frank Lello
- Date of birth: 24 February 1920
- Place of birth: Ludlow, England
- Date of death: August 1997 (aged 77)
- Place of death: Liverpool, England
- Position: Wing half

Senior career*
Years	Team	Apps	(Gls)
- Shrewsbury Town
1947–1956	Everton	237	(9)
1956–1957	Rochdale	11	(0)
- Runcorn
- * Club domestic league appearances and goals

Cyril Frank Lello (24 February 1920 – August 1997) was an English professional footballer who played for Shrewsbury Town, Lincoln City, Everton, Rochdale and Runcorn.

Born in Ludlow, Shropshire, he had played at amateur level for Ludlow Town and Hereford United before turning professional when he joined Shrewsbury Town in 1939. He served in the Royal Air Force during the Second World War, and made guest appearances for Lincoln City. He also played for Derry City while posted in Northern Ireland. After the war ended, he signed for Everton in 1946. He set a record 155 consecutive appearances for the club. He transferred to Rochdale in 1956.

In retirement after playing for Runcorn, he ran an electrical goods shop and ran youth club football sides for several years. He died in August 1997 in Liverpool at the age of 77.
