= Jackie Carr (soccer, born 1926) =

South African soccer player (1926–1996)

Personal information
- Full name: John William Carr
- Date of birth: 10 June 1926
- Place of birth: Durban, South Africa
- Date of death: 13 December 1996 (aged 70)
- Place of death: Durban, South Africa
- Position: Winger

Senior career*
Years	Team	Apps	(Gls)
1950–1951	Huddersfield Town	1	(0)
- * Club domestic league appearances and goals

John William Carr (10 June 1926 – 13 December 1996) was a professional footballer who played as a winger for Huddersfield Town. He was born and died in Durban, South Africa.
