= Henry Mills (cricketer) =

English cricketer (1847–1915)

Henry Maynard Mills (18 August 1847 – 13 April 1915) was an English first-class cricketer active 1879–81 who played for Middlesex and Marylebone Cricket Club (MCC). He was born in Paddington; died in Buenos Aires.
