= Charlie Gallogly =

Irish football player

Personal information
- Full name: Charles Gallogly
- Date of birth: 16 June 1919
- Place of birth: Gilford, County Down, Ireland
- Date of death: 12 January 1993 (aged 73)
- Place of death: New York, U.S.
- Position: Fullback

Senior career*
Years	Team	Apps	(Gls)
- Glenavon
1949–1952	Huddersfield Town	76	(0)
1952–1954	Watford	47	(0)
1954–1955	Bournemouth & Boscombe Athletic	0	(0)

International career
1950	Ireland	2	(0)
- * Club domestic league appearances and goals

Charles Gallogly (16 June 1919 – 12 January 1993) was an Irish professional footballer who played as a fullback for Huddersfield Town, Watford and Bournemouth & Boscombe Athletic.

In 1950 he was awarded two caps for Northern Ireland. In 1958, he emigrated to the United States – for whom he had won a single international cap in 1949 – and managed Brooklyn Shamrocks F.C. from 1958 to 1961. He died in New York on 12 January 1993.
