= Albert Hobson =

English footballer (1925–2017)

Personal information
- Date of birth: 7 April 1925
- Place of birth: Glossop, England
- Date of death: 23 December 2017 (aged 92)
- Position: Midfielder

Senior career*
Years	Team	Apps	(Gls)
1945–1954	Blackpool	60	(3)
1954–1956	Huddersfield Town	9	(0)
1956–1957	York City	22	(1)
- * Club domestic league appearances and goals

Albert Hobson (7 April 1925 – 23 December 2017) was an English footballer who played for Blackpool, Huddersfield Town and York City.

== Career ==
Hobson started his career with Blackpool in August 1945. He joined Huddersfield Town in July 1954 and finally moved to York City in March 1956. He died on 23 December 2017 at the age of 92.
