= Dave Hickson =

English footballer (1929–2013)

Personal information
- Full name: David Hickson
- Date of birth: 30 October 1929
- Place of birth: Salford, England
- Date of death: 8 July 2013 (aged 83)
- Position: Forward

Youth career
- Ellesmere Port Town

Senior career*
Years	Team	Apps	(Gls)
1948–1955	Everton	139	(63)
1955	Aston Villa	12	(1)
1955–1957	Huddersfield Town	54	(28)
1957–1959	Everton	86	(32)
1959–1961	Liverpool	60	(37)
1961	Cambridge City	?	(?)
1961–1962	Bury	8	(0)
1962–1963	Tranmere Rovers	45	(21)
1967	Fleetwood F.C.	3	(1)

Managerial career
- 1963–1964: Ballymena United
- 1967: Ballymena United
- 1968: Bangor
- * Club domestic league appearances and goals

David Hickson (30 October 1929 – 8 July 2013) was an English professional footballer who played as a forward for Everton, Aston Villa, Huddersfield Town, Liverpool, Cambridge City, Bury and Tranmere Rovers. Best known for his time at Everton, he could produce a powerful shot which earned him the nickname the Cannonball Kid.

== Career ==
Hickson started his football career as a teenager with non-league Ellesmere Port Town, where his robust style and keen eye for goal were noticed by the Everton manager Cliff Britton. He signed for the Toffees in 1948, but serving his stint of National Service delayed his debut for another three years. During this period he played for the Cheshire Army Cadets team, and it was with them that he was coached by the Everton legend Dixie Dean. It is fairly safe to assume that Dave developed the physical side of his game in this period. Hickson made his debut for Everton in September 1951 against Leeds United, with the Blues in Division Two for only the second season in their history. Hickson was soon a regular fixture in the Everton side.

Perhaps the defining moment in Dave's career came in Everton's 1952–53 FA Cup run. The Blues were still in Division Two, and home wins against Ipswich Town and Nottingham Forest put Everton into the fifth round, where they were drawn with Manchester United. In front of a capacity crowd at Goodison Park, Hickson launched himself headlong in amongst flying boots and emerged with a huge gash above one eyebrow. Hickson was led off down the tunnel, with the crowd fully expecting Everton to play the remainder with 10 men, as substitutes were not yet permitted. He emerged from the tunnel in the second half, greeted by a huge ovation from the crowd, with a row of freshly applied stitches holding the wound together. Minutes later Hickson scored what would end up as the winning goal, then headed against the post and opened the wound again. Despite pleas from both the referee and his captain to leave the field Hickson remained to the end of the game, his blond hair now red, and his shirt the same colour as the United ones. Hickson was also the match-winner in the quarter final against Aston Villa, with a thunderbolt shot from the edge of the box, after starting the move himself behind the halfway line. An epic year for cup ties this, as Everton next faced Bolton Wanderers at Maine Road. Hickson again received a head injury in this game, and was forced to retire with 15 minutes of the game to go. This was not until he'd scored a goal in an improbable comeback from 4-0 down at half time. The final score was 4–3, with Bolton going on to be defeated by the same score against Blackpool in the "Matthews final".

Everton soon returned to Division One, as Hickson's haul of 25 goals in the 1953–54 season helped them gain promotion to the top flight. After just one season back in the top flight with Everton, Hickson was sold to Aston Villa for £17,500. He never settled at Villa Park and played just 12 games in a brief stay.

He moved next to Huddersfield Town, where he spent a further two years. Although his record at Huddersfield was respectable, Hickson was not content and he was happy to return to Goodison for a second spell in 1957 for £7,500. At least the board made a tidy profit on these deals. Hickson's second spell was not as productive as his first, but his passion & determination remained, and the Goodison Park faithful still worshipped him. When Everton sold him to their Merseyside derby rivals Liverpool in 1959, there was much dissent.

Hickson was undoubtedly revered at Everton, but equally despised by the red half of the city. Supporters of the Reds, then struggling in Division Two, would soon be appeased. Hickson scored twice on his Liverpool debut at Anfield, watched by a crowd 15,000 higher than the average that season. Days later Liverpool had a new manager, Bill Shankly. Shankly had previously managed Hickson at Huddersfield and again made effective use of Hickson's style. His return of 21 goals in 27 games that season almost took Liverpool back to the top flight. Another near promotion the following year and a return of 16 goals in 33 would see the end of Hickson's stint with Liverpool. Hickson was now nearing 32 and had to make way for Shankly's new signings.

Hickson moved on, via non league Cambridge City, to Bury for a short spell, playing just a handful of games. He headed back to Merseyside in the twilight of his career, with a productive last couple of league seasons at Tranmere Rovers. He was Rovers' leading scorer in the 1962/63 season with 23 goals, at the age of 34. Dave continued after this outside the Football League, playing for Ellesmere Port Town and Ballymena United (player/manager for both), and as a player at Winsford, Northwich Victoria and Fleetwood F.C..

It is often said of Hickson that he is the only player to have played "for all three Merseyside clubs". This is wrong for several reasons: two other players, John Heydon and Frank Mitchell, also played for all three of Everton, Liverpool and Tranmere Rovers. But New Brighton were Football League members from 1923 to 1951 and Bill Lacey and Neil McBain played for all three of Everton, Liverpool and New Brighton. In addition, John Whitehead played for Liverpool, Everton and also for Bootle in their one year as a league team (1892/93), before they were replaced in Division 2 by Liverpool.

== Style of play ==
A physical centre forward, Hickson was popular with Everton supporters for his aggressive playing style. His temperament also led to several disciplinary incidents, including three sendings-off during his career. He formed a striking partnership with John Willie Parker, playing as the target man. Although best known as an aerial threat, Hickson was also dangerous with the ball at his feet. His powerful shot earned him the nickname "Cannonball Kid".

== Death ==
On 8 July 2013, Hickson died after a short illness, at the age of 83. His funeral service was held on 25 July 2013 at Liverpool Cathedral.
