= Gerry Burrell =

Northern Ireland footballer

Personal information
- Full name: Gerald Burrell
- Date of birth: 6 September 1924
- Place of birth: Portadown, Northern Ireland
- Date of death: 25 October 2014 (aged 90)
- Place of death: Belfast, Northern Ireland
- Position: Outside right

Youth career
- Belfast Celtic II
- Dundela

Senior career*
Years	Team	Apps	(Gls)
1947–1951	St Mirren	90	(26)
1951–1953	Dundee	31	(6)
1953–1956	Huddersfield Town	59	(9)
1956–1958	Chesterfield	51	(4)
1958-1960	Portadown		
1960-1961	Bangor		
1961-196-	Dundela		
Total		231	(45)
- * Club domestic league appearances and goals

Gerald Burrell (6 September 1924 – 25 October 2014) was a professional footballer, who played in the Scottish Football League for St Mirren and Dundee and in the English Football League for Huddersfield Town and Chesterfield during the 1940s and 1950s. He played as an outside right.

He was selected to play for the Third Division North representative team in 1956–57.
