= Jackie Marriott =

English footballer

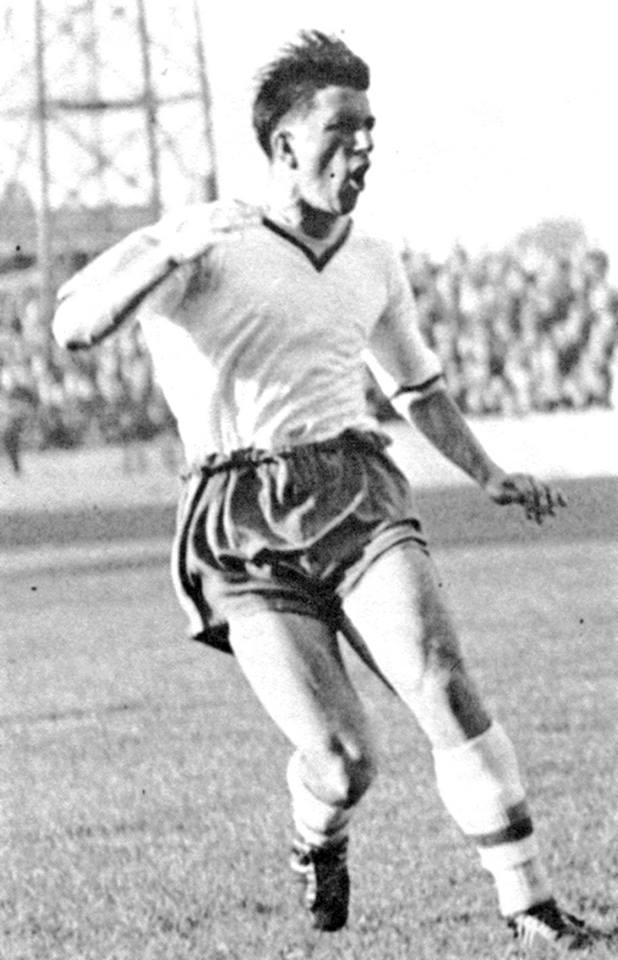

Personal information
- Full name: John Leonard Marriott
- Date of birth: 1 April 1928
- Place of birth: Scunthorpe, England
- Date of death: 9 February 2016 (aged 87)
- Place of death: Scunthorpe, England
- Position: Outside right

Youth career
- Scunthorpe United

Senior career*
Years	Team	Apps	(Gls)
194?–1947	Scunthorpe United		
1947–1955	Sheffield Wednesday	153	(19)
1955–1957	Huddersfield Town	38	(4)
1957–1964	Scunthorpe United	212	(26)
- * Club domestic league appearances and goals

John Leonard Marriott (1 April 1928 – 9 February 2016) was an English professional footballer who made more than 400 appearances in the Football League playing as an outside right for Sheffield Wednesday, Huddersfield Town and Scunthorpe United.
