= Johnny McKenna =

Northern Ireland footballer

Personal information
- Full name: John McKenna
- Date of birth: 6 June 1926
- Place of birth: Belfast, Northern Ireland
- Date of death: 1980 (aged 53–54)
- Height: 5 ft 5 in (1.65 m)
- Position: Midfielder

Senior career*
Years	Team	Apps	(Gls)
1945–1948	Linfield	46	(12)
1948–1953	Huddersfield Town	134	(8)
1954–1957	Blackpool	25	(2)
1957–1958	Southport	15	(1)
1958–1959	Wisbech Town	12	(0)

International career
1949–1951	Northern Ireland	7	(0)
- * Club domestic league appearances and goals

John McKenna (6 June 1926 – 1980) was a professional footballer who played mainly for Huddersfield Town during the 1940s and 1950s. He also gained seven caps for Northern Ireland.
