= Ron Staniforth =

English footballer (1924–1988)

Personal information
- Full name: Ronald Staniforth
- Date of birth: 13 April 1924
- Place of birth: Manchester, England
- Date of death: 5 October 1988 (aged 64)
- Place of death: Barrow in Furness, England
- Position: Defender

Senior career*
Years	Team	Apps	(Gls)
1946–1952	Stockport County	223	(1)
1952–1955	Huddersfield Town	110	(0)
1955–1959	Sheffield Wednesday	102	(2)
1959–1961	Barrow	38	(0)
Total		473	(3)

International career
1954	England	8	(0)

Managerial career
- 1959–1964: Barrow
- * Club domestic league appearances and goals

Ronald Staniforth (13 April 1924 – 5 October 1988) was an English footballer, described as a tall, cultured full-back. His attacking excursions down the right wing sometimes caused concern to his team's supporters but probably more to his opponents.

After service in the Royal Navy during World War II he became a milkman and played in local league football, signing professional for Stockport County at the relatively late age of 22. When the Stockport manager Andy Beattie moved to Huddersfield Town in the 1952 close season, Staniforth followed. Huddersfield had just been relegated. Staniforth, together with all the remainder of the defence, played in every game in the following season in which Huddersfield finished in second place and so were promoted back to the First Division.

In their first season back, Huddersfield maintained their momentum and were challenging for the championship. This led to Staniforth playing three times for England 'B' and then gaining eight England caps, all in 1954, including three in the final stages of the World Cup. He was also in the England side which notoriously lost 7–1 to Hungary although this did not lead to his losing his place.

In 1955 Huddersfield were becoming concerned about the ageing profile of their team and Staniforth was dropped after being given the run-around by Bobby Mitchell in a quarter-final of the F.A. Cup. In July 1955 he moved to Sheffield Wednesday, along with Roy Shiner, in an exchange deal which brought Tony Conwell and Jackie Marriott to Huddersfield (they were respectively eight and four years younger).

At the age of 31, however, Staniforth's career was far from over. It must have seemed like déjà vu. Like his arrival at Huddersfield, Wednesday had just been relegated from the First Division and were promoted in his first season. Also he teamed up again with former Huddersfield defender Don McEvoy. He went on to make 102 appearances for Wednesday over four seasons, during which they were promoted twice and relegated once.

In October 1959 he moved to Barrow as player-manager, later to be joined by McEvoy as a player. He retired from playing after 38 games and resigned as manager in 1964. Later he had two spells on the coaching staff at Hillsborough.

He died in Barrow on 5 October 1988, aged 64.
