= Ian Duthie =

Scottish footballer

Personal information
- Full name: Ian Martin Duthie
- Date of birth: 18 January 1930
- Place of birth: Trumperton, Forfar, Scotland
- Date of death: 27 June 2010 (aged 80)
- Place of death: Huddersfield, England
- Position: Midfielder

Senior career*
Years	Team	Apps	(Gls)
- Forfar Celtic
1949–1953	Huddersfield Town	7	(0)
1954–1956	Bradford City	28	(4)
- Witton Albion
- Northwich Victoria
- * Club domestic league appearances and goals

Ian Martin Duthie (18 January 1930 – 27 June 2010) was a Scottish professional footballer who played as a striker for Forfar Celtic, Huddersfield Town, Bradford City, Witton Albion and Northwich Victoria. He was born in Trumperton, Forfar, Scotland. His time at Huddersfield Town was interrupted by National service.

He married the daughter of fellow professional football player, Roy Goodall, who captained England in the early 1930s, and had two children and two grandchildren.

He was an archetypal Scottish lad o' parts. As well as playing football he served an apprenticeship as a painter and decorator, undertook teacher training, became a lecturer in interior decorating at Northwich School of Art and then a senior lecturer at Huddersfield Polytechnic. After gaining further qualifications he was awarded a degree in education at Leeds University and a master's degree at Sheffield University.
