= Dick Parker =

English footballer

Personal information
- Full name: Richard Parker
- Date of birth: 14 September 1894
- Place of birth: Stockton-on-Tees, England
- Date of death: 1 January 1969 (aged 74)
- Place of death: Stockton-on-Tees, England
- Position: Centre forward

Senior career*
Years	Team	Apps	(Gls)
1913–1914	Norton		
1914	Thornaby Corinthians		
1914	South Bank		
1914	Stockton		
1919–1920	Sunderland	6	(2)
1920	Coventry City	26	(11)
1920–1921	South Shields	9	(5)
1921–1922	Wallsend		
1922–1924	Queens Park Rangers	61	(30)
1924–1927	Millwall	88	(62)
1927–1928	Watford	13	(2)
1928–1929	Merthyr Town	0	(0)
- Tunbridge Wells Rangers
- * Club domestic league appearances and goals

Richard Parker (14 September 1894 – 1 January 1969) was an English professional footballer who made over 200 appearances as a centre forward in the Football League. He is best remembered for his three-year spell with Millwall, for whom he scored 62 goals in 88 league matches.

== Personal life ==
Parked attended Tilery School in Stockton-on-Tees. He served in the Northumberland Fusiliers during the First World War.

== Career statistics ==
Appearances and goals by club, season and competition
Club	Season	League			FA Cup		Total	
Club	Season	Division	Apps	Goals	Apps	Goals	Apps	Goals
Sunderland	1919–20	First Division	6	2	0	0	6	2
Coventry City	1919–20	Second Division	16	9	0	0	16	9
Coventry City	1920–21	Second Division	10	2	0	0	10	2
Coventry City	Total		26	11	0	0	26	11
Queens Park Rangers	1922–23	Third Division South	28	16	4	4	32	20
Queens Park Rangers	1923–24	Third Division South	33	14	1	0	34	14
Queens Park Rangers	Total		61	30	5	4	66	34
Millwall	1924–25	Third Division South	24	10	1	0	25	10
Millwall	1925–26	Third Division South	22	11	4	3	26	14
Millwall	1926–27	Third Division South	40	37	5	1	45	38
Millwall	1927–28	Third Division South	2	4	—		2	4
Millwall	Total		88	62	10	4	98	66
Watford	1927–28	Third Division South	13	2	1	1	14	3
Career total			194	107	16	9	210	116
