= Tommy Cavanagh =

English footballer (1928–2007)

Personal information
- Full name: Thomas Henry Cavanagh
- Date of birth: 29 June 1928
- Place of birth: Liverpool, England
- Date of death: 14 March 2007 (aged 78)
- Place of death: Driffield, England
- Position: Inside forward

Senior career*
Years	Team	Apps	(Gls)
1948–1950	Preston North End	0	(0)
1950–1952	Stockport County	32	(2)
1952–1956	Huddersfield Town	93	(29)
1956–1959	Doncaster Rovers	119	(16)
1959–1960	Bristol City	24	(6)
1960–1961	Carlisle United	33	(4)
Total		301	(57)

Managerial career
- 1961: Cheltenham Town
- 1965–1966: Brentford
- 1983: Rosenborg
- 1985–1986: Burnley
- * Club domestic league appearances and goals

Thomas Henry Cavanagh (29 June 1928 – 14 March 2007) was an English football player and coach. As a player, he was an inside-forward at six professional clubs, most notably Huddersfield Town, Doncaster Rovers and was player manager at Cheltenham Town, Brentford, Newcastle, and Manchester United, leading the latter to win the FA cup in 1977.

== Career ==
After retiring as a player, Cavanagh coached and later managed Brentford. He coached at Nottingham Forest from 1966 until 1972. He then linked up with his former Preston teammate Tommy Docherty as a coach at Manchester United. During this time he worked with George Best, who notably bought him a white television for being late for training. Cavanagh stayed at United when Docherty was sacked in 1977 and became assistant manager under Docherty's successor, Dave Sexton, but he left the club following Ron Atkinson's appointment in 1981. From 1976 to 1979 he was also Northern Ireland assistant manager to Danny Blanchflower. He later had a spell as coach at Newcastle United.

Ahead of the 1983 season, Cavanagh was hired as manager of Rosenborg. In Norwegian, the terms coach and manager are used interchangeably. Cavanagh had previously done an excellent job as coach at Manchester United, but lacked abilities in team selection, tactics and inspiration. He used players in the wrong position, and instructed the ball to be kicked over the midfield, making it impossible to use the playmaker. He believed in breaking down the players and then building them up, and was unarguably good at the former. By the summer, his style was costing the club players: Knut Torbjørn Eggen transferred to Orkanger in the Fourth Division, while Øivind Husby transferred to Brøndby in Denmark. Cavanagh was fired in August, at which time the club was second-last in the league, and Nils Arne Eggen took over as manager for the rest of the season. The team finished on a seventh place. President Erling Meirik withdrew as a consequence of the hiring, stating that in the future, the club should hire people based on more than their reputation and that they should seek judicial assistance with the contract.

In 1985, he became Martin Buchan's assistant at Burnley, and took over as manager when Buchan was sacked later that year. After leaving Burnley in 1986, he worked at the FA School of Excellence at Lilleshall until his retirement.

== Personal life ==
In 2002, Cavanagh was diagnosed with Alzheimer's disease and died in March 2007, aged 78.

Sporting positions
Preceded by Frank Blunstone	Manchester United F.C. assistant manager 1977–1981	Succeeded by Mick Brown
