= Roy Shiner =

English footballer

Personal information
- Full name: Roy Albert James Shiner
- Date of birth: 15 November 1924
- Place of birth: Ryde, Isle of Wight, England
- Date of death: 1988 (aged 63–64)
- Height: 5 ft 8 1/2 in (1.74 m)
- Position: Striker

Senior career*
Years	Team	Apps	(Gls)
- Ryde Sports
- Cheltenham Town
1951–1955	Huddersfield Town	21	(6)
1955–1959	Sheffield Wednesday	153	(93)
1959–1960	Hull City	22	(8)

Managerial career
- Newport (IOW)
- Seaview
- St. Helens
- * Club domestic league appearances and goals as of 27 August 2007

Roy Albert James Shiner (15 November 1924 in Ryde, Isle of Wight – 1988) was a professional footballer who played as a forward for Ryde Sports, Cheltenham Town, Huddersfield Town, Sheffield Wednesday & Hull City. He later went on to manage clubs on the Isle of Wight such as Newport (IOW), Seaview and St. Helens. During the period 1946 - 1951 whilst I (Roger Edwards) was the team mascot, Roy Shiner played regularly for Ryde Sports as a centre forward. During this period Ryde Sports won the Hampshire League Gold Cup; which was paraded through the town on the roof of the team coach.

Shiner joined Huddersfield in December 1951 as a replacement for Ronnie Burke at centre-forward and made his debut on Christmas Day. He played in eight further matches that season but for the next three years he was used mainly as a replacement when another forward was injured. Always an enthusiastic and vigorous player, he made a total of only 21 first-team appearances in three and a half seasons at Huddersfield, scoring six goals.

He moved to Sheffield Wednesday along with Ron Staniforth in the summer of 1955 where his career blossomed. In four seasons there he made 153 appearances and scored 93 goals. He then spent a season at Hull City.
