= Jack Wheeler (footballer, born 1919) =

English footballer and coach

Personal information
- Full name: William John Wheeler
- Date of birth: 13 July 1919
- Place of birth: North Littleton, near Evesham, England
- Date of death: 10 January 2009 (aged 89)
- Place of death: Nottingham, England
- Position: Goalkeeper

Senior career*
Years	Team	Apps	(Gls)
193?–1938	Cheltenham Town		
1938–1948	Birmingham City	12	(0)
1948–1956	Huddersfield Town	166	(0)
1956–1957	Kettering Town	47	(0)

Managerial career
- 1968–1969: Notts County (caretaker manager)
- * Club domestic league appearances and goals

William John Wheeler (13 July 1919 – 10 January 2009) was an English professional footballer who played as a goalkeeper for Cheltenham Town, Birmingham City, Huddersfield Town and Kettering Town. He helped Huddersfield Town to promotion to the First Division, and played more than 150 matches in the Football League for the club. After his playing career finished, he spent more than 25 years with Notts County, in a variety of roles including coach, trainer, caretaker manager and scout.

== Personal ==
Wheeler was born in North Littleton, near Evesham, Worcestershire. He died in Queen's Medical Centre, Nottingham on 10 January 2009 at the age of 89. A minute's applause was observed before Notts County's League Two game with Exeter City later the same day.

== Playing career ==
Wheeler started playing in village and mid week football in the Evesham area for teams such as Cleeve Prior Amateurs and Evesham Early Closers, he also played in the Evesham Town reserve team before returning to mid week football. While at Evesham Early Closers he had a trial with Coventry City. He joined Cheltenham Town in the summer of 1937 and played for them in the Southern League before joining First Division Birmingham as a professional in 1938. He was signed as understudy and potential successor to England goalkeeper Harry Hibbs, but played only five first-team matches – as the youngest goalkeeper in the First Division – before the Second World War interrupted his career. During the war he served in the 6th Armoured Division in North Africa and Italy, but when he returned to his club, future England international Gil Merrick had established himself as first-choice goalkeeper. Wheeler played six matches in the renamed Birmingham City's Second Division championship-winning 1947–48 season when Merrick was injured, but before the next season started he was transferred to Huddersfield Town.

Wheeler had to spend some time in the reserves before becoming a first-team regular at Huddersfield. They were relegated in 1952, but promoted back to the First Division in the following season. Wheeler and the five defenders in the side (Ron Staniforth, Laurie Kelly, Bill McGarry, Don McEvoy and Len Quested) shared the distinction of playing every game of the club's 42-match promotion campaign, a league record.

In 1956 he joined Southern League club Kettering Town, where the former England international Tommy Lawton was player-manager. Though the club had struggled the previous season, Wheeler helped them win the Southern League title in 1956–57, playing 47 matches in all competitions. When Lawton took over as manager of Notts County at the end of that season, he asked Wheeler to come with him as coach and trainer.

== Notts County ==
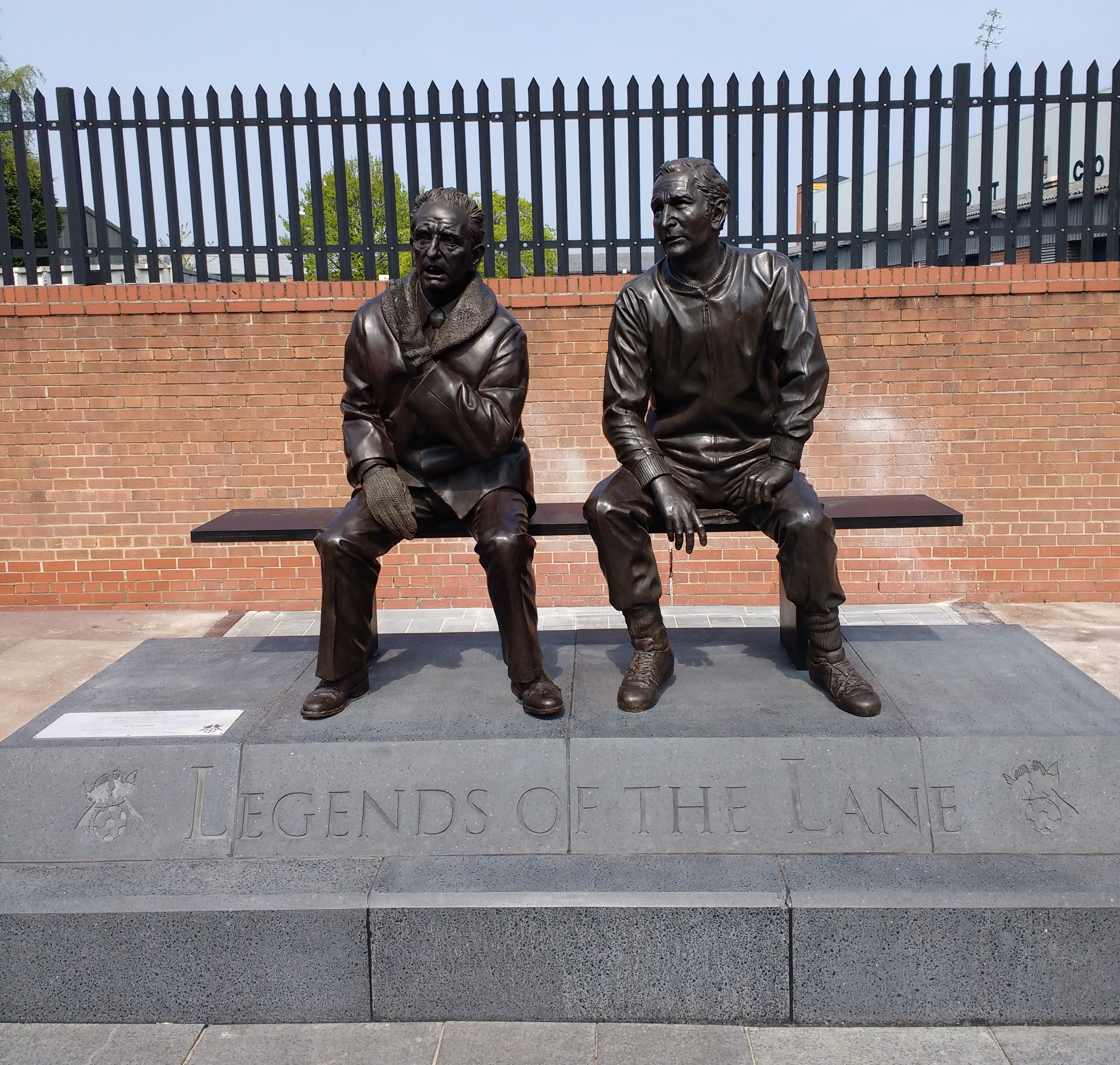
Jimmy & Jack statue at Meadow Lane

Between joining the club in 1957 and retirement enforced by arthritis in the hip in 1983, during which time he filled numerous roles including trainer, coach, caretaker manager and scout, Wheeler never missed a first-team match – 1,152 consecutive games. In recognition of such service, the club awarded him life membership and a permanent seat in the Meadow Lane directors' box, and had announced plans to rename their clubhouse "Wheeler's" in his honour.
