= Jimmy Glazzard =

English footballer (1923–1995)

Jim Glazzard
Personal information
- Date of birth: 23 April 1923
- Place of birth: Normanton, West Yorkshire, England
- Date of death: 1995 (aged 71–72)
- Place of death: Yorkshire, England
- Position: Striker

Senior career*
Years	Team	Apps	(Gls)
1946–1956	Huddersfield Town	299	(142)
1956–1957	Everton	3	(0)
1956–1957	Mansfield Town	22	(10)
Total		324	(152)
- * Club domestic league appearances and goals

Jim Glazzard (23 April 1923, in Normanton, Yorkshire – 1995) was a professional footballer, who spent most of his career at Huddersfield Town, where he became a fans' favourite. After playing as an amateur for Altofts Colliery he signed for the club in October 1943 and played his first game for the first team in the Wartime League (North) in the same month. His first game after the resumption of the Football League was in August 1946 and his last was in April 1956. Apart from one season (1952–53) Huddersfield were in the First Division of the Football League throughout this period.

After being used in various positions in midfield and attack, he settled into his most effective position, at centre forward. Although of relatively slight build compared to, say, Nat Lofthouse, he was top scorer for the club on six occasions and joint top scorer in the First Division with 29 goals in 1953–54. He was an exceptional header of the ball and his most memorable achievement was heading four goals in an 8–2 victory over Everton in April 1953, all four coming from crosses from the left wing by Vic Metcalfe.

With Lofthouse firmly ensconced as England centre forward and with competition from the likes of Jackie Milburn, Stan Mortensen and Ronnie Allen, it is perhaps not too surprising that his only representative honour was as reserve for a 'B' international against West Germany in March 1954. At this time Huddersfield were near the top of the First Division (something they have not repeated since). Coincidentally both Milburn and Mortensen had guested for Huddersfield during the war.

Glazzard scored 142 goals in 299 league games for Huddersfield. A number of reports show Glazzard as scoring 141 League for Huddersfield Town; this is incorrect.

On 20 January 1951 there was a disputed goal against Arsenal, which was first awarded to Glazzard, then to Hepplewhite and later back to Glazzard.

The Huddersfield Examiner of 20 January 1951 stated:

"After 18 minutes Huddersfield took the lead. Platt the Arsenal goalkeeper could not keep hold of possession of a low ball which looked to have been deflected, and Glazzard forced it over the line."

In a later paragraph which was related to the second half, it read:

"It was difficult from the press box to determine the actual scorer of Town's goal, during the interval it was learned that Hepplewhite was credited with it, being the last player to play the ball before Platt's fumble."

In the 22 January 1951 edition of Huddersfield Examiner it was reported:

"Huddersfield Town FC are crediting the first Town goal on Saturday to Jim Glazzard. At half time I learned that the Referee had credited the goal to Hepplewhite, but after the game he held an inquiry in the dressing room so he could complete his match report when he was informed by all the players who all thought Glazzard was the actual scorer."

A book in celebration of the club's centenary by a team of people, including club historian Ian Thomas and his wife, have also credited the goal to Glazzard, hence him having 142 League goals, a Town League goals record that he holds jointly with George Brown.

In August 1956 he was transferred to Everton. Things did not work out there and he moved on to Mansfield Town after only three senior appearances. Ten goals and 22 appearances later, he retired in the summer of 1957 aged 34.

In later years he suffered from Alzheimer's disease and died in 1995, aged 72. A number of reports on his matches are to be found in the nostalgia section of the Huddersfield Daily Examiner website.
