= Bryan Frear =

English footballer

Personal information
- Date of birth: 8 July 1933 (age 93)
- Place of birth: Cleckheaton, England
- Date of death: 1997 (aged 63–64)
- Position: Striker

Youth career
- Huddersfield Town

Senior career*
Years	Team	Apps	(Gls)
1951–1956	Huddersfield Town	37	(10)
1956–1964	Chesterfield	281	(84)
1964–1965	Halifax Town	35	(5)
- * Club domestic league appearances and goals

Bryan Frear (8 July 1933 – 1997) was an English professional footballer who played in the Football League as a striker for Huddersfield Town, Chesterfield and Halifax Town.
