= Willie Davie =

Scottish footballer (1925–1996)

Personal information
- Full name: William Clark Davie
- Date of birth: 7 January 1925
- Place of birth: Paisley, Scotland
- Date of death: 29 January 1996 (aged 71)
- Place of death: Huddersfield, England
- Position: Inside forward

Senior career*
Years	Team	Apps	(Gls)
1947–1950	St Mirren	50	(4)
1950–1951	Luton Town	42	(11)
1951–1957	Huddersfield Town	113	(16)
1957–1958	Walsall	7	(0)
- * Club domestic league appearances and goals

William Clark Davie (7 January 1925 – 29 January 1996) was a Scottish professional footballer, who played for a number of Scottish and English football clubs during the 1940s and 1950s.
