= Ron Simpson (English footballer) =

English footballer

Personal information
- Date of birth: 25 February 1934
- Place of birth: Carlisle, England
- Date of death: 10 November 2010 (aged 76)
- Place of death: Carlisle, England
- Position: Left wing

Senior career*
Years	Team	Apps	(Gls)
1951–1958	Huddersfield Town	110	(24)
1958–1965	Sheffield United	203	(45)
1965–1966	Carlisle United	45	(6)
1966–1967	Queen of the South	25	(4)
- * Club domestic league appearances and goals

Ronald Simpson (25 February 1934 – 11 November 2010) was an English professional footballer, born in Carlisle, Cumberland, who played as a midfielder in the Football League for Huddersfield Town, Sheffield United and Carlisle United and in the Scottish Football League for Queen of the South. He died on 11 November 2010 following a short illness. There was a floral tribute to Simpson at Bramall Lane in his honour. His funeral was on 18 November 2010.
