= Brian Gibson (footballer) =

English footballer

Personal information
- Date of birth: 22 February 1928
- Place of birth: Huddersfield, England
- Date of death: 11 May 2010 (aged 82)
- Position: Defender

Senior career*
Years	Team	Apps	(Gls)
19xx–1951	Paddock Athletic		
1951–1962	Huddersfield Town	157	(1)
- * Club domestic league appearances and goals

Brian Gibson (22 February 1928 – 11 May 2010) was an English professional footballer born in Huddersfield, who played as a defender in the Football League for Huddersfield Town.
