= John Battye =

English footballer

Personal information
- Full name: John Edward Battye
- Date of birth: 19 May 1926
- Place of birth: Scissett, Huddersfield, England
- Date of death: June 2016 (aged 90)
- Place of death: Barnsley, England
- Position: Wing half

Senior career*
Years	Team	Apps	(Gls)
1949–1957	Huddersfield Town	71	(1)
1959–1960	York City	17	(0)
- * Club domestic league appearances and goals

John Edward Battye (19 May 1926 – June 2016) was an English professional footballer who played for Huddersfield Town and York City. He was born in Scissett, near Huddersfield, Yorkshire.
