= Andy Beattie =

Scottish footballer and manager

Personal information
- Full name: Andrew Beattie
- Date of birth: 11 August 1913
- Place of birth: Kintore, Aberdeenshire, Scotland
- Date of death: 20 September 1983 (aged 70)
- Place of death: Nottingham, England
- Height: 5 ft 8 in (1.73 m)
- Position: Full back

Senior career*
Years	Team	Apps	(Gls)
1930–1935	Inverurie Loco Works		
1935–1947	Preston North End	125	(5)

International career
1937–1939	Scotland	7	(0)
1941–1942	Scotland (wartime)	5	(0)

Managerial career
- 1947–1949: Barrow
- 1949–1952: Stockport County
- 1952–1956: Huddersfield Town
- 1954: Scotland
- 1958–1960: Carlisle United
- 1959–1960: Scotland
- 1960–1963: Nottingham Forest
- 1963–1964: Plymouth Argyle
- 1964–1965: Wolverhampton Wanderers
- 1967: Notts County
- * Club domestic league appearances and goals

Andrew Beattie (11 August 1913 – 20 September 1983) was a Scottish professional football player and manager. He was the first manager of the Scotland national team.

== Playing career ==
Beattie was born in Kintore, Aberdeenshire and was employed when young as a quarry-man at the Inverurie Locomotive Works. He was soon to join the Inverurie Loco Works FC where he established himself as an accomplished full-back before attracting the interest of English First Division club Preston North End. They paid £135 for him in March 1935, but World War II was to sadly interrupt his career and he made just 125 Football League appearances for the Lilywhites, scoring five goals, before retiring from his only professional club in March 1947.

The war also curtailed a promising international career which saw him awarded seven Scotland caps between April 1937 and December 1938. In spite of spending part of his military service abroad Beattie was also to gain a further five unofficial caps for Scotland during wartime internationals and appear as a 'guest' player for several clubs. Most notably though he helped his own side Preston North End secure the 1940–41 double of the North Regional League Championship and the Wartime League Cup, which they won by beating Arsenal 2–1 after a 1–1 draw.

== Managerial career ==
=== Barrow ===
After the war, and with his playing days now behind him, Beattie accepted the position of secretary-manager with Barrow, then a mid-table club in the old English regional Third Division North, after leaving Preston in March 1947. Barrow had long been 'also-rans' and in the 25 years since joining the Football League had already been forced to seek re-election five times – but Beattie's arrival was to change all that. The 1946–47 season saw them finish 9th but Beattie was to create a local sensation by having his players report back for pre-season training a whole month before the new season's start. The new team spirit he fostered paid rich dividends and, after beating Halifax Town 2–1 on Boxing Day, his Barrow team topped the table for the first time ever.

Beattie's Barrow 'Bluebirds' would at last finish a creditable seventh and also experienced some FA Cup success along the way. A club record gate of 14,081 saw their 3–2 'derby' victory over Carlisle United in the first round before a 1–0 success at non-League Runcorn set up an away tie at Chelsea in round three. Some 44,336 crammed into Stamford Bridge to see Beattie's team lose 0–5, but the attendance is still the largest Barrow have ever played before. Finally a third club record gate was achieved on Good Friday when 11,644 watched a 1–1 draw with Wrexham, their biggest ever crowd for a home league fixture.

Beattie then shocked Barrow when, only two weeks before the 1948–49 season was due to begin, he handed in his resignation following a dispute with the club chairman. After the board refused to accept this, the chairman and another director resigned and Beattie carried on, but his team began to slip down the table and attendances fell.

=== Stockport County ===
By the end of March 1949 he at last left the troubled Bluebirds to join Stockport County, also a Third Division North club, whom he transformed from a mid-table side into promotion challengers in late 1951–52. It was then that top-flight Huddersfield Town approached Beattie and asked him to become their manager.

=== Huddersfield Town ===
The Yorkshire club offered Beattie a reported salary of around £2,500 but despite his efforts to save the club from the drop he was simply too late. Huddersfield were relegated to Division Two for the first time in their history but Beattie, then one of the youngest managers in the Football League, and who had now nailed two lucky horseshoes to his office wall, was already planning ahead. During the summer months he was to make three crucial signings. Full-back Ron Staniforth and utility player Tommy Cavanagh followed him across the Pennines from Stockport County, whilst inside forward Jimmy Watson came down from Motherwell to pep up the attack.

Under Andy Beattie, Huddersfield Town performed strongly in Division Two; during 1952–53 Town and Sheffield United left the rest behind with United eventually pipping Town for the title by two points as both Yorkshire clubs gained promotion. Along the way Huddersfield had also recorded an 8–2 thrashing of Everton, a 6–0 beating of Barnsley, and 5–0 wins over Lincoln City and Southampton. The entire defence of Jack Wheeler, Ron Staniforth, Laurie Kelly, Bill McGarry, Don McEvoy and Len Quested played in every fixture, as did winger Vic Metcalfe, while 30-goal top scoring centre forward Jimmy Glazzard missed only one match as Town gained an immediate return to the top flight.

Back in Division One, Beattie's team then continued the charge despite being wracked by injury, and eventually finished in a very creditable third place. They were just two points behind runners-up West Bromwich Albion and six behind champions Wolverhampton Wanderers. This remains Huddersfield's highest finish in the Football League since World War Two, yet a decline was soon to set in. 1954–55 saw them slip down to 12th spot, despite a run to the FA Cup quarter-finals, and Beattie offered to resign that August only to be persuaded to stay on. At this point Town appointed Bill Shankly to assist Beattie, the two men having been former teammates at Preston North End years earlier, but relegation was again around the corner.

Huddersfield struggled in vain to avoid the drop, in a season that saw the emergence of future England full-back Ray Wilson, and they succumbed to the inevitable ironically with Sheffield United, the side with whom they had been promoted three years before. Beattie resigned in November 1956 as he felt he had taken the team as far as he could. Bill Shankly was thus left in charge as Beattie sought out a new career as a sub-postmaster at Penwortham, Preston, where he could spend more time with his wife and four children.

=== Later career ===
However, football had been his life and in May 1958 he answered the call to manage Carlisle United, where he stayed until moving to top-flight Nottingham Forest in 1960.

His next stop was at Plymouth Argyle, where he was appointed manager in 1963. There he helped stave off relegation from Division Two in 1963–64 but his next job was to end in disaster.

He was appointed caretaker manager at Wolverhampton Wanderers in November 1964, replacing Stan Cullis. The team were bottom of the table at this point, with just three points. Beattie was unable to halt their slump and the club dropped to the Second Division after 23 seasons in the top flight. He began the new season still at the helm but resigned after nine games, ending with a 9–3 thrashing at Southampton in September 1965.

After a stint scouting for Brentford, Beattie's next port of call was Notts County, who made him 'advisor' to Peter Doherty in December 1965. In March 1967 County made him general manager where he remained until joining John Harris at Sheffield United as assistant manager in October 1967, and before retiring he also held coaching or scouting positions with both Walsall and Liverpool.

=== Scotland manager ===
Beattie became Scotland's first manager in February 1954, although his brief tenure was something of a farce. After of the match Austria vs Scotland in 1954 FIFA World Cup (in which the Austrians defeated the Scots by 1–0), in the Scotland's first entry into the competition, he resigned after claiming his four-game stint with a squad of only 13 players (as the Scottish Football Association determined at time) placed him in an impossible situation, becoming the only coach to resign during a World Cup to date. Later, the Scots (which were once again led by a technical committee) were soundly defeated 7–0 by Uruguay and were knocked out of the tournament (becoming the only other team that hasn't scored a goal in the competition, alongside South Korea).

In March 1959 he was once again appointed Scotland manager, but resigned in November 1960 because of his commitments with Forest.

== Death ==
Beattie died in September 1983 at the age of 70.

== Honours ==
Preston North End

- FA Cup: 1937–38; runner-up: 1936–37
