= Len Quested =

English footballer (1925–2012)

Personal information
- Full name: Wilfred Leonard Quested
- Date of birth: 9 January 1925
- Place of birth: Folkestone, England
- Date of death: 20 August 2012 (aged 87)
- Place of death: Buderim, Queensland, Australia
- Positions: Full-back; midfielder

Senior career*
Years	Team	Apps	(Gls)
1945	HMS Golden Hind		(25)
1946	North Shore		
1946–1947	Folkestone Town		
1947–1951	Fulham	175	(6)
1951–1957	Huddersfield Town	220	(8)
1957–1963	Auburn		
1963	Hakoah Eastern Suburbs		
1965	Awaba		

Managerial career
- 1964: Cumberland United
- 1966–1967: Cumberland United
- * Club domestic league appearances and goals

Wilfred Leonard Quested (9 January 1925 – 20 August 2012) was an English footballer. Quested played one match for England B as well as being selected as a travelling reserve for a Full International for England. In 1957 he moved to Australia where he played for the Sydney clubs Auburn and Hakoah. He also played in an unofficial match for Australia.

== Life ==
Quested's son Gary also became a soccer player and got to play twice for Australia. Len Quested settled in Kuluin, a suburb of Maroochydore on Queensland's Sunshine Coast. He died on 20 August 2012.
