= Don McEvoy =

English footballer and manager

Personal information
- Full name: Donald William McEvoy
- Date of birth: 3 December 1928
- Place of birth: Golcar, Yorkshire, England
- Date of death: 9 October 2004 (aged 75)
- Place of death: Halifax, England
- Position: Defender

Senior career*
Years	Team	Apps	(Gls)
1949–1954	Huddersfield Town	148	(3)
1954–1958	Sheffield Wednesday	105	(1)
1958–1960	Lincoln City	23	(0)
1960–1962	Barrow	74	(1)
Total		350	(5)

Managerial career
- 1962–1964: Halifax Town
- 1964–1967: Barrow
- 1967–1968: Grimsby Town
- 1968–1970: Southport
- 1970–1971: Barrow
- * Club domestic league appearances and goals

Donald William McEvoy (3 December 1928 – 9 October 2004) was a professional footballer, who played principally for Huddersfield Town, his home-town club, and Sheffield Wednesday and latterly for Lincoln City and Barrow, who were then in the Fourth Division. He later went on to manage Halifax Town, Barrow (twice), Grimsby Town and Southport.

After local league football he signed for Huddersfield as an amateur in 1945, turned professional in September 1947 and made his debut in the first team in October 1949. After a short spell at centre forward he became a formidable centre-half for the remainder of his career. He was in promoted sides at both Huddersfield and Sheffield and led Barrow to their only promotion in the Football League. He retired from playing after the 1961–62 season and from management in 1971. His sole representative honour was to play for the FA in a 3–1 win against the Army in November 1953.

There is a good summary of his career on the give me football website. Further details are in the references.
