= Harry Mills (footballer) =

English footballer

Personal information
- Full name: Henry Owen Mills
- Date of birth: 23 August 1922
- Place of birth: Blyth, Northumberland, England
- Date of death: 1990 (aged 67–68)
- Place of death: Northumberland, England
- Position: Goalkeeper

Senior career*
Years	Team	Apps	(Gls)
- Blyth Spartans
1947–1956	Huddersfield Town	157	(0)
1956–1957	Halifax Town	26	(0)
- Blyth Spartans
- * Club domestic league appearances and goals

Henry Owen Mills (23 August 1922 – 1990) is a former professional footballer, who played for Blyth Spartans, Huddersfield Town and Halifax Town. He was born in Blyth, Northumberland.
