= Laurie Kelly (footballer) =

English footballer

Personal information
- Date of birth: 28 April 1925
- Place of birth: Wolverhampton, England
- Date of death: 1972
- Place of death: Dudley, Staffordshire, England
- Position: Defender

Youth career
- –: Wolverhampton Wanderers

Senior career*
Years	Team	Apps	(Gls)
1947–1950	Wolverhampton Wanderers	60	(0)
1950–1956	Huddersfield Town	225	(2)
–	Nuneaton Borough		

Managerial career
- –: Nuneaton Borough
- * Club domestic league appearances and goals

Laurence Kelly (28 April 1925 – 1972) was an English professional footballer who played as a defender in the Football League for Wolverhampton Wanderers and Huddersfield Town.

He signed amateur forms for his home-town club in 1940 and made his first-team debut in the 1942–43 season in the Wartime League (North), with seven appearances in all. He first played in the Football League in 1947–48. However Wolves were then at the start of a period of dominance in the First Division and Kelly was not a regular first team player; he made 60 league appearances in three seasons. In October 1950 he was persuaded to move to Huddersfield who had had difficulties with the left back position. He made the position his own for the next six years, during which he was a member of the Huddersfield Town defence which was ever-present through the 1952–53 season. He made 239 first team appearances in all, playing five seasons in the First Division and two in the Second. Huddersfield also reached the quarter-final of the F.A. Cup during this period.

In 1956–57 it was Huddersfield's policy to reduce the average age of the team and Kelly lost his place to the up-and-coming Ray Wilson. At the end of the season he moved to play for and manage non-league club Nuneaton Borough. He resigned from that post in December 1958.
