= 1946–47 Huddersfield Town A.F.C. season =

Huddersfield Town
1946–47 season
- Chairman: Philip Wood
- Manager: David Steele
- Stadium: Leeds Road
- Football League First Division: 20th
- FA Cup: Third round (eliminated by Barnsley)
- Top goalscorer: League: Jimmy Glazzard (11); All: Jimmy Glazzard (11)
- Highest home attendance: 39,944 vs Barnsley (7 January 1947)
- Lowest home attendance: 4,172 vs Portsmouth (29 January 1947)
- Biggest win: 5–1 vs Charlton Athletic (2 November 1946)
- Biggest defeat: 0–5 vs Leeds United (5 October 1946); 1–6 vs Wolverhampton Wanderers (12 October 1946)
Home colours

Huddersfield Town's 1946–47 campaign was the first full season since the end of World War II, but Town would have little to cheer during the season. Under David Steele, Town were in the relegation zone for majority of the season, but because of the even worse displays of relegation candidates Brentford and Leeds United saw Town live to fight another day in Division 1.

== Squad at the start of the season ==
Note: Flags indicate national team as defined under FIFA eligibility rules; some limited exceptions apply. Players may hold more than one non-FIFA nationality.

Pos.	Nation	Player
GK	ENG	Don Clegg
GK	ENG	Bob Hesford
GK	EIR	Brendan McManus
DF	ENG	Graham Bailey
DF	ENG	Jeff Barker
DF	ENG	Eddie Boot
DF	ENG	Tom Briggs
DF	ENG	George Green
DF	IRL	Bill Hayes
DF	ENG	George Howe
DF	ENG	Alf Newbold
DF	ENG	John Simpson

Pos.	Nation	Player
DF	ENG	Les Smith
DF	ENG	Albert Watson
MF	ENG	Albert Bateman
MF	ENG	Eddie Carr
MF	ENG	Vic Metcalfe
MF	ENG	George Skelton
FW	ENG	Lewis Brook
FW	ENG	Jimmy Glazzard
FW	ENG	Joe Poole
FW	ENG	Billy Price
FW	SCO	Frank Reid
FW	ENG	Arnold Rodgers

== Review ==
David Steele had been Town manager since 1943, but this was his first season in league football management with the Leeds Road club and it would be his last in Huddersfield. Town lost 5 of their opening league matches, but oddly enough won the other game 5–2 against Derby County. During October, Town lost 4 matches and conceded 19 goals in a 5–0 defeat against Leeds United, a 6–1 loss at Wolverhampton Wanderers and 4–1 defeats to Liverpool and Middlesbrough.

Following that run, Town beat Charlton Athletic 5–1, but Town's form never made any dramatic improvements and even lost an FA Cup tie at home to Barnsley. Luckily during that season, Town were up against 2 worse teams in the relegation dogfight in Brentford and Leeds United, who were more than 7 points behind Town by the end of the season. This however didn't stop Steele from resigning at the end of the season.

== Squad at the end of the season ==
Note: Flags indicate national team as defined under FIFA eligibility rules; some limited exceptions apply. Players may hold more than one non-FIFA nationality.

Pos.	Nation	Player
GK	ENG	Don Clegg
GK	ENG	Bob Hesford
GK	EIR	Brendan McManus
DF	ENG	Graham Bailey
DF	ENG	Jeff Barker
DF	ENG	Eddie Boot
DF	ENG	Tom Briggs
DF	ENG	George Green
DF	IRL	Bill Hayes
DF	ENG	George Hepplewhite
DF	ENG	George Howe
DF	ENG	Joe Lodge
DF	ENG	John Simpson
DF	ENG	Les Smith
DF	ENG	Alan Stewart

Pos.	Nation	Player
DF	ENG	Albert Watson
MF	ENG	Albert Bateman
MF	ENG	Eddie Carr
MF	SCO	Harry McShane
MF	ENG	Vic Metcalfe
MF	ENG	George Skelton
FW	ENG	Lewis Brook
FW	EIR	Peter Doherty
FW	ENG	Jimmy Glazzard
FW	ENG	Billy Price
FW	SCO	Frank Reid
FW	ENG	Arnold Rodgers
FW	ENG	Arthur Thompson
FW	ENG	Maurice Tompkin
FW	ENG	Alf Whittingham

== Results ==
=== Division One ===
Date	Opponents	Home/ Away	Result F–A	Scorers	Attendance	Position
31 August 1946	Blackpool	H	1–3	Glazzard	14,378	17th
4 September 1946	Sunderland	A	0–3		37,595	21st
7 September 1946	Brentford	A	0–2		31,264	22nd
11 September 1946	Derby County	H	5–2	McShane, Glazzard, Price (2), Bateman	18,748	17th
14 September 1946	Blackburn Rovers	H	0–1		17,368	20th
21 September 1946	Portsmouth	A	1–3	Glazzard	30,591	22nd
25 September 1946	Sunderland	H	0–0		15,551	21st
28 September 1946	Everton	H	1–0	Glazzard	19,208	18th
5 October 1946	Leeds United	A	0–5		30,622	22nd
12 October 1946	Wolverhampton Wanderers	A	1–6	Bateman	37,690	22nd
19 October 1946	Liverpool	H	1–4	Brook	17,323	22nd
26 October 1946	Middlesbrough	A	1–4	Tompkin	36,694	22nd
2 November 1946	Charlton Athletic	H	5–1	Rodgers (3), Bateman, Glazzard	16,944	22nd
9 November 1946	Grimsby Town	A	0–1		14,815	22nd
16 November 1946	Preston North End	H	3–0	Rodgers (2), Thompson	17,733	22nd
23 November 1946	Manchester United	A	2–5	Thompson, Glazzard	39,216	22nd
30 November 1946	Stoke City	H	1–0	Metcalfe	26,767	22nd
7 December 1946	Bolton Wanderers	A	0–4		21,975	22nd
14 December 1946	Chelsea	H	1–4	Bateman	9,011	22nd
21 December 1946	Sheffield United	A	2–2	Bateman, Glazzard	23,980	22nd
25 December 1946	Aston Villa	A	2–2	Glazzard, Rodgers	29,906	22nd
26 December 1946	Aston Villa	H	1–0	Rodgers	39,606	20th
28 December 1946	Blackpool	A	1–2	Metcalfe	24,558	21st
4 January 1947	Brentford	H	3–0	Rodgers (2), Glazzard	27,759	21st
18 January 1947	Blackburn Rovers	A	2–2	Glazzard, Metcalfe	24,218	21st
29 January 1947	Portsmouth	H	1–2	Doherty	4,172	21st
1 February 1947	Everton	A	0–1		37,205	21st
22 February 1947	Liverpool	A	0–1		35,000	21st
8 March 1947	Charlton Athletic	A	3–0	Thompson, Bateman, Doherty	27,805	20th
15 March 1947	Grimsby Town	H	3–2	Bateman, Doherty, Whittingham	17,204	20th
22 March 1947	Preston North End	A	2–6	Doherty, Whittingham	25,460	20th
29 March 1947	Manchester United	H	2–2	Whittingham, Doherty	18,509	20th
4 April 1947	Arsenal	A	2–1	Metcalfe, Doherty (pen)	46,105	20th
5 April 1947	Stoke City	A	0–3		29,257	20th
7 April 1947	Arsenal	H	0–0		33,381	20th
12 April 1947	Bolton Wanderers	H	1–0	Whittingham	21,639	20th
19 April 1947	Chelsea	A	0–1		38,903	20th
26 April 1947	Sheffield United	H	1–1	Whittingham	18,406	20th
3 May 1947	Derby County	A	0–1		16,883	20th
10 May 1947	Leeds United	H	1–0	Doherty (pen)	20,596	19th
17 May 1947	Middlesbrough	H	3–1	Whittingham (2), Glazzard	16,328	19th
26 May 1947	Wolverhampton Wanderers	H	0–1		25,401	19th

=== FA Cup ===
Date	Round	Opponents	Home/ Away	Result F–A	Scorers	Attendance
11 January 1947	Round 3	Barnsley	H	3–4	Doherty (2), Bateman	39,944

== Appearances and goals ==
Name	Nationality	Position	League		FA Cup		Total	
Name	Nationality	Position	Apps	Goals	Apps	Goals	Apps	Goals
Graham Bailey	England	DF	33	0	1	0	34	0
Jeff Barker	England	DF	32	0	1	0	33	0
Albert Bateman	England	MF	40	7	1	1	41	8
Eddie Boot	England	DF	40	0	1	0	41	0
Tom Briggs	England	DF	15	0	0	0	15	0
Lewis Brook	England	FW	6	1	0	0	6	1
Eddie Carr	England	MF	2	0	0	0	2	0
Don Clegg	England	GK	1	0	0	0	1	0
Peter Doherty	Ireland	FW	19	7	1	2	20	9
Jimmy Glazzard	England	FW	31	11	1	0	32	11
George Green	England	DF	2	0	0	0	2	0
Bill Hayes	Republic of Ireland	DF	18	0	0	0	18	0
George Hepplewhite	England	DF	23	0	1	0	24	0
Bob Hesford	England	GK	40	0	1	0	41	0
George Howe	England	DF	10	0	0	0	10	0
Joe Lodge	England	DF	1	0	0	0	1	0
Brendan McManus	Ireland	GK	1	0	0	0	1	0
Harry McShane	Scotland	MF	15	1	0	0	15	1
Vic Metcalfe	England	MF	27	4	1	0	28	4
Alf Newbold	England	DF	2	0	0	0	2	0
Joe Poole	England	FW	2	0	0	0	2	0
Billy Price	England	FW	9	2	0	0	9	2
Frank Reid	Scotland	FW	2	0	0	0	2	0
Arnold Rodgers	England	FW	13	9	1	0	14	9
John Simpson	England	DF	5	0	0	0	5	0
George Skelton	England	FW	1	0	0	0	1	0
Les Smith	England	DF	16	0	0	0	16	0
Alan Stewart	England	DF	7	0	1	0	8	0
Arthur Thompson	England	FW	18	3	0	0	18	3
Maurice Tompkin	England	FW	10	1	0	0	10	1
Albert Watson	England	DF	6	0	0	0	6	0
Alf Whittingham	England	FW	15	7	0	0	15	7
