= 1947–48 Huddersfield Town A.F.C. season =

Huddersfield Town
1947–48 season
- Chairman: Haydn Battye
- Manager: George Stephenson
- Stadium: Leeds Road
- Football League First Division: 19th
- FA Cup: Third round (eliminated by Colchester United)
- Top goalscorer: League: Peter Doherty (13); All: Peter Doherty (13)
- Highest home attendance: 38,266 vs Manchester United (27 March 1948)
- Lowest home attendance: 13,905 vs Everton (28 April 1948)
- Biggest win: 5–1 vs Grimsby Town (10 September 1947); 5–1 vs Bolton Wanderers (11 October 1947)
- Biggest defeat: 0–4 vs Blackpool (1 September 1947); 0–4 vs Liverpool (6 March 1948)
Home colours

Huddersfield Town's 1947–48 campaign was a dreadful season for Town under new manager George Stephenson, brother of Town legend Clem Stephenson. They would finish the season in 19th place in Division 1, but had to endure the humiliation of being knocked out of the FA Cup by Southern League side Colchester United.

== Squad at the start of the season ==
Note: Flags indicate national team as defined under FIFA eligibility rules; some limited exceptions apply. Players may hold more than one non-FIFA nationality.

Pos.	Nation	Player
GK	ENG	Don Clegg
GK	ENG	Bob Hesford
DF	ENG	Jeff Barker
DF	ENG	Eddie Boot
DF	ENG	Tom Briggs
DF	ENG	George Green
DF	IRL	Bill Hayes
DF	ENG	George Hepplewhite
DF	ENG	George Howe
DF	ENG	Joe Lodge
DF	ENG	Les Smith
DF	ENG	Alan Stewart

Pos.	Nation	Player
DF	ENG	Albert Watson
MF	ENG	Albert Bateman
MF	ENG	George Hutchinson
MF	ENG	Vic Metcalfe
FW	EIR	Peter Doherty
FW	ENG	Jimmy Glazzard
FW	ENG	Billy Price
FW	SCO	Frank Reid
FW	ENG	Arnold Rodgers
FW	ENG	Arthur Thompson
FW	ENG	Alf Whittingham

== Review ==
Following David Steele's resignation, George Stephenson, brother of Town legend Clem was appointed as the new manager at Leeds Road. The previous season's 20th-place finish needed to improve and Town made a bright start with 3 wins in the first 6 games, including a 5–1 win at Grimsby Town. A 5–1 win at Bolton Wanderers, the following month stopped a winless run of 6 matches, but Town only won 12 matches in the league all season and never won more than 2 matches in a row.

The main result of the season, came up in the FA Cup, when Town lost 1–0 to Southern League side Colchester United. This match is cited in historical account of FA Cup.

== Squad at the end of the season ==
Note: Flags indicate national team as defined under FIFA eligibility rules; some limited exceptions apply. Players may hold more than one non-FIFA nationality.

Pos.	Nation	Player
GK	ENG	Don Clegg
GK	ENG	Ray Dring
GK	ENG	Bob Hesford
GK	ENG	Harry Mills
DF	ENG	Jeff Barker
DF	ENG	Eddie Boot
DF	ENG	Tom Briggs
DF	IRL	Bill Hayes
DF	ENG	George Hepplewhite
DF	ENG	George Howe
DF	ENG	Joe Lodge
DF	ENG	Jack Percival
DF	ENG	Les Smith

Pos.	Nation	Player
DF	ENG	Alan Stewart
DF	ENG	Albert Watson
MF	ENG	Albert Bateman
MF	ENG	Vic Metcalfe
FW	EIR	Peter Doherty
FW	ENG	Jimmy Glazzard
FW	ENG	Albert Nightingale
FW	SCO	Frank Reid
FW	ENG	Arnold Rodgers
FW	ENG	Conway Smith
FW	ENG	Arthur Thompson
FW	ENG	Alf Whittingham

== Results ==
=== Division One ===
Date	Opponents	Home/ Away	Result F–A	Scorers	Attendance	Position
23 August 1947	Derby County	A	0–0		30,069	10th
27 August 1947	Blackpool	H	2–0	Whittingham (2)	32,099	4th
30 August 1947	Portsmouth	H	0–2		25,415	12th
1 September 1947	Blackpool	A	0–4		29,555	15th
6 September 1947	Chelsea	H	3–1	Doherty, Metcalfe, Price	24,837	13th
10 September 1947	Grimsby Town	H	5–1	Doherty (2), Green, Glazzard, Whittingham	20,145	9th
13 September 1947	Everton	A	1–1	Metcalfe	40,622	6th
17 September 1947	Grimsby Town	A	0–3		17,658	10th
20 September 1947	Wolverhampton Wanderers	H	0–1		28,591	14th
27 September 1947	Aston Villa	A	1–2	Thompson	36,000	16th
4 October 1947	Sunderland	H	2–2	Thompson, Metcalfe	24,928	16th
11 October 1947	Bolton Wanderers	A	5–1	Doherty, Rodgers (3), Whittingham	27,590	13th
18 October 1947	Liverpool	H	1–1	Ramsden (og)	27,518	15th
25 October 1947	Middlesbrough	A	0–1		36,142	16th
1 November 1947	Charlton Athletic	H	0–1		22,028	18th
8 November 1947	Manchester United	A	4–4	Glazzard, Doherty (2, 1 pen), Bateman	59,772	18th
15 November 1947	Preston North End	H	1–0	Bateman	27,506	15th
22 November 1947	Arsenal	A	0–2		47,514	17th
29 November 1947	Sheffield United	H	2–1	Whittingham, Doherty	21,915	13th
6 December 1947	Stoke City	A	1–1	Whittingham	24,451	13th
13 December 1947	Burnley	H	0–1		36,375	16th
20 December 1947	Derby County	H	2–1	Doherty (2)	27,752	13th
26 December 1947	Manchester City	A	1–1	Whittingham	56,460	13th
27 December 1947	Manchester City	H	1–1	Whittingham	32,634	15th
3 January 1948	Portsmouth	A	2–3	Doherty (pen), Glazzard	23,481	17th
17 January 1948	Chelsea	A	4–2	Bateman, Whittingham, Metcalfe, Glazzard	41,908	15th
7 February 1948	Wolverhampton Wanderers	A	1–2	Doherty	35,875	15th
14 February 1948	Aston Villa	H	0–1		20,571	15th
21 February 1948	Sunderland	A	0–2		33,146	16th
28 February 1948	Bolton Wanderers	H	1–2	Bateman	14,273	18th
6 March 1948	Liverpool	A	0–4		40,000	21st
13 March 1948	Middlesbrough	H	2–1	Metcalfe, Nightingale	23,588	18th
20 March 1948	Charlton Athletic	A	0–0		29,837	18th
26 March 1948	Blackburn Rovers	A	2–1	Bateman, Glazzard	28,795	16th
27 March 1948	Manchester United	H	0–2		38,266	18th
29 March 1948	Blackburn Rovers	H	1–1	Bateman	19,928	17th
3 April 1948	Preston North End	A	2–0	Glazzard (2)	27,648	17th
10 April 1948	Arsenal	H	1–1	Bateman	38,110	18th
17 April 1948	Sheffield United	A	1–0	Doherty	32,596	17th
24 April 1948	Stoke City	H	0–0		16,115	17th
28 April 1948	Everton	H	1–3	Glazzard	13,905	17th
1 May 1948	Burnley	A	1–2	Doherty	25,443	19th

=== FA Cup ===
Date	Round	Opponents	Home/ Away	Result F–A	Scorers	Attendance
10 January 1948	Round 3	Colchester United	A	0–1		17,000

== Appearances and goals ==
Name	Nationality	Position	League		FA Cup		Total	
Name	Nationality	Position	Apps	Goals	Apps	Goals	Apps	Goals
Jeff Barker	England	DF	35	0	1	0	36	0
Albert Bateman	England	MF	31	7	1	0	32	7
Eddie Boot	England	DF	41	0	1	0	42	0
Tom Briggs	England	DF	8	0	0	0	8	0
Don Clegg	England	GK	2	0	0	0	2	0
Peter Doherty	Ireland	FW	38	13	1	0	39	13
Ray Dring	England	GK	4	0	0	0	4	0
Jimmy Glazzard	England	FW	34	8	1	0	35	8
George Green	England	DF	7	1	0	0	7	1
Bill Hayes	Republic of Ireland	DF	40	0	1	0	41	0
George Hepplewhite	England	DF	39	0	1	0	40	0
Bob Hesford	England	GK	25	0	1	0	26	0
George Hutchinson	England	MF	1	0	0	0	1	0
Joe Lodge	England	DF	1	0	0	0	1	0
Vic Metcalfe	England	MF	42	5	1	0	43	5
Harry Mills	England	GK	11	0	0	0	11	0
Albert Nightingale	England	MF	11	1	0	0	11	1
Jack Percival	England	DF	1	0	0	0	1	0
Billy Price	England	FW	5	1	0	0	5	1
Frank Reid	Scotland	FW	3	0	0	0	3	0
Arnold Rodgers	England	FW	6	3	0	0	6	3
Conway Smith	England	MF	3	0	1	0	4	0
Les Smith	England	DF	21	0	1	0	22	1
Alan Stewart	England	DF	2	0	0	0	2	0
Arthur Thompson	England	FW	6	2	0	0	6	2
Albert Watson	England	DF	4	0	0	0	4	0
Alf Whittingham	England	FW	41	9	1	0	42	9
