= 1948–49 Huddersfield Town A.F.C. season =

Huddersfield Town
1948–49 season
- Chairman: Haydn Battye
- Manager: George Stephenson
- Stadium: Leeds Road
- Football League First Division: 20th
- FA Cup: Fourth round (eliminated by Newport County)
- Top goalscorer: League: Peter Doherty (13); All: Peter Doherty (14)
- Highest home attendance: 41,322 vs Blackpool (27 December 1948)
- Lowest home attendance: 15,401 vs Aston Villa (12 February 1949)
- Biggest win: 5–0 vs Queens Park Rangers (15 January 1949)
- Biggest defeat: 1–7 vs Wolverhampton Wanderers (2 October 1948)
Home colours

Huddersfield Town's 1948–49 campaign is referred to in Town folklore as the original "Great Escape" season (the second being the 1997–98 season), when Arnold Rodgers scored the goal that saw Town maintain their 1st Division status. His goal against Manchester City, with 10 minutes of the last match of the season remaining saw Town keep their status and relegate Preston North End and Sheffield United in the process.

== Squad at the start of the season ==
Note: Flags indicate national team as defined under FIFA eligibility rules; some limited exceptions apply. Players may hold more than one non-FIFA nationality.

Pos.	Nation	Player
GK	ENG	Bob Hesford
GK	ENG	Harry Mills
DF	ENG	Eddie Boot
DF	ENG	Tom Briggs
DF	IRL	Bill Hayes
DF	ENG	George Hepplewhite
DF	ENG	George Howe
DF	ENG	Jack Percival
DF	ENG	Alan Stewart
DF	ENG	Henry Stewart
MF	ENG	Albert Bateman

Pos.	Nation	Player
MF	ENG	Vic Metcalfe
FW	EIR	Peter Doherty
FW	ENG	Jimmy Glazzard
FW	ENG	Harold Hassall
FW	ENG	Albert Nightingale
FW	SCO	Frank Reid
FW	ENG	Arnold Rodgers
FW	ENG	Conway Smith
FW	ENG	John Tanner
FW	ENG	Arthur Thompson
FW	ENG	Alf Whittingham

== Review ==
Town's fortunes during the season didn't seem to improve on the previous season. Even the 14 goals from veteran Peter Doherty didn't seem to pull Town away from almost certain relegation. Relegation seemed to be certain for 2 out of Town, Preston North End and Sheffield United. With 10 minutes of Town's last match at home against Manchester City seemed to be heading down the trapdoor to Division 2.

But, an uncharacteristic error by legendary goalkeeper Frank Swift gave Arnold Rodgers the chance to score, which he did. Town won 1–0 which relegated Preston & Sheffield United and meant Town would live to fight another day.

== Squad at the end of the season ==
Note: Flags indicate national team as defined under FIFA eligibility rules; some limited exceptions apply. Players may hold more than one non-FIFA nationality.

Pos.	Nation	Player
GK	ENG	Bob Hesford
GK	ENG	Harry Mills
GK	ENG	Jack Wheeler
DF	ENG	Eddie Boot
DF	ENG	Tom Briggs
DF	IRL	Bill Hayes
DF	ENG	George Hepplewhite
DF	ENG	George Howe
DF	ENG	Donald Hunter
DF	ENG	Jack Percival
DF	ENG	Alan Stewart
DF	ENG	Henry Stewart
DF	ENG	Bill Whittaker

Pos.	Nation	Player
MF	ENG	Albert Bateman
MF	DEN	Karl Aage Hansen
MF	EIR	Johnny McKenna
MF	ENG	Vic Metcalfe
FW	EIR	Peter Doherty
FW	ENG	Jimmy Glazzard
FW	ENG	Harold Hassall
FW	ENG	Albert Nightingale
FW	SCO	Frank Reid
FW	ENG	Arnold Rodgers
FW	ENG	Conway Smith
FW	ENG	Arthur Thompson

== Results ==
=== Division One ===
Date	Opponents	Home/ Away	Result F–A	Scorers	Attendance	Position
21 August 1948	Arsenal	H	1–1	Whittingham	30,620	7th
25 August 1948	Derby County	A	1–4	Tanner	31,236	19th
28 August 1948	Charlton Athletic	A	1–3	Smith	38,437	21st
1 September 1948	Derby County	H	1–1	Doherty	24,182	20th
4 September 1948	Manchester United	A	1–4	Doherty	57,714	21st
6 September 1948	Bolton Wanderers	A	2–1	Hepplewhite, Metcalfe	25,332	18th
11 September 1948	Sheffield United	H	0–0		21,088	19th
15 September 1948	Bolton Wanderers	H	0–2		16,046	20th
18 September 1948	Aston Villa	A	3–3	Doherty (2), Smith	44,523	20th
25 September 1948	Sunderland	H	2–0	Smith, Nightingale	23,035	17th
2 October 1948	Wolverhampton Wanderers	A	1–7	Nightingale	36,153	17th
9 October 1948	Stoke City	H	1–3	Hassall	19,385	18th
16 October 1948	Burnley	A	2–1	Metcalfe (2)	28,976	18th
23 October 1948	Preston North End	H	0–2		20,819	19th
30 October 1948	Everton	A	0–2		46,632	19th
6 November 1948	Chelsea	H	3–4	Doherty (2, 1 pen), Nightingale	18,963	20th
13 November 1948	Birmingham City	A	0–1		35,207	20th
20 November 1948	Middlesbrough	H	0–0		16,413	22nd
27 November 1948	Newcastle United	A	4–2	Nightingale, Doherty (3)	49,332	21st
4 December 1948	Portsmouth	H	0–0		21,785	19th
11 December 1948	Manchester City	A	1–3	Doherty	31,717	21st
18 December 1948	Arsenal	A	0–3		40,000	22nd
25 December 1948	Blackpool	A	0–0		29,244	21st
27 December 1948	Blackpool	H	1–0	Boot	41,322	20th
1 January 1949	Charlton Athletic	H	1–2	Smith	20,937	21st
22 January 1949	Sheffield United	A	0–0		37,126	22nd
12 February 1949	Aston Villa	H	0–1		15,401	22nd
19 February 1949	Sunderland	A	1–0	Doherty (pen)	42,719	22nd
5 March 1949	Stoke City	A	3–1	Hansen, McKenna, Doherty (pen)	15,595	22nd
12 March 1949	Burnley	H	1–0	McKenna	23,136	20th
19 March 1949	Middlesbrough	A	0–1		33,279	21st
26 March 1949	Newcastle United	H	0–2		25,745	21st
2 April 1949	Chelsea	A	0–5		48,136	22nd
6 April 1949	Manchester United	H	2–1	Doherty (pen), Metcalfe	17,256	21st
9 April 1949	Birmingham City	H	0–0		18,856	21st
15 April 1949	Liverpool	A	1–0	Glazzard	47,319	19th
16 April 1949	Preston North End	A	0–2		36,153	21st
18 April 1949	Liverpool	H	0–4		22,158	22nd
23 April 1949	Everton	H	1–1	McKenna	19,051	22nd
30 April 1949	Portsmouth	A	0–2		37,042	22nd
5 May 1949	Wolverhampton Wanderers	H	4–0	McKenna, Rodgers (2), Hansen	21,445	21st
7 May 1949	Manchester City	H	1–0	Rodgers	27,507	20th

=== FA Cup ===
Date	Round	Opponents	Home/ Away	Result F–A	Scorers	Attendance
8 January 1949	Round 3	Queens Park Rangers	A	0 – 0 (aet: 90 mins: 0 – 0)		25,000
15 January 1949	Round 3 Replay	Queens Park Rangers	H	5–0	Glazzard (2), Nightingale, McKenna, Bateman	31,075
29 January 1949	Round 4	Newport County	A	3 – 3 (aet: 90 mins: 3 – 3)	Doherty, Glazzard (2)	22,500
5 February 1949	Round 4 Replay	Newport County	H	1–3	Metcalfe	34,183

== Appearances and goals ==
Name	Nationality	Position	League		FA Cup		Total	
Name	Nationality	Position	Apps	Goals	Apps	Goals	Apps	Goals
Albert Bateman	England	MF	2	0	2	1	4	1
Eddie Boot	England	DF	41	1	4	0	45	1
Tom Briggs	England	DF	18	0	4	0	22	0
Peter Doherty	Ireland	FW	26	13	2	1	28	14
Jimmy Glazzard	England	FW	30	1	4	4	34	5
Karl Hansen	Denmark	MF	15	2	0	0	15	2
Harold Hassall	England	FW	3	1	0	0	3	1
Bill Hayes	Republic of Ireland	DF	37	0	4	0	41	0
George Hepplewhite	England	DF	39	1	4	0	43	1
George Howe	England	DF	1	0	0	0	1	0
Donald Hunter	England	DF	13	0	0	0	13	0
Johnny McKenna	Ireland	MF	39	4	4	1	43	5
Vic Metcalfe	England	MF	37	4	2	1	39	5
Harry Mills	England	GK	26	0	0	0	26	0
Albert Nightingale	England	MF	28	4	4	1	32	5
Frank Reid	Scotland	FW	2	0	0	0	2	0
Arnold Rodgers	England	FW	5	3	0	0	5	3
Conway Smith	England	MF	16	4	0	0	16	4
Alan Stewart	England	DF	5	0	0	0	5	0
Henry Stewart	England	DF	23	0	0	0	23	0
John Tanner	England	MF	1	1	0	0	1	1
Arthur Thompson	England	FW	1	0	0	0	1	0
Jack Wheeler	England	GK	16	0	4	0	20	0
Bill Whittaker	England	DF	27	0	4	0	31	0
Alf Whittingham	England	FW	11	1	0	0	11	1
