= 1949–50 Huddersfield Town A.F.C. season =

Huddersfield Town
1949–50 season
- Chairman: Haydn Battye
- Manager: George Stephenson
- Stadium: Leeds Road
- Football League First Division: 15th
- FA Cup: Third round (eliminated by Sunderland)
- Top goalscorer: League: Vic Metcalfe; Jeff Taylor (11); All: Vic Metcalfe; Jeff Taylor (11)
- Highest home attendance: 37,766 vs Newcastle United (11 April 1950)
- Lowest home attendance: 12,352 vs Bolton Wanderers (25 February 1950)
- Biggest win: 4–0 vs Stoke City (11 March 1950)
- Biggest defeat: 1–7 vs Wolverhampton Wanderers (24 September 1949); 0–6 vs Manchester United (5 November 1949); 0–6 vs Sunderland (7 January 1950)
Home colours

Huddersfield Town's 1949–50 campaign saw Town finish in their highest position in Division 1 since their 3rd-place finish in the 1935–36 season. They finished in 15th place with just 37 points and most of the highlights of the season were of the negative sort with disappointing thrashings by Wolverhampton Wanderers and Manchester United, as well as a 6–0 drubbing by Sunderland in the FA Cup.

== Squad at the start of the season ==
Note: Flags indicate national team as defined under FIFA eligibility rules; some limited exceptions apply. Players may hold more than one non-FIFA nationality.

Pos.	Nation	Player
GK	ENG	Bob Hesford
GK	ENG	Harry Mills
GK	ENG	Jack Wheeler
DF	ENG	John Battye
DF	ENG	Eddie Boot
DF	ENG	Tom Briggs
DF	IRL	Bill Hayes
DF	ENG	George Hepplewhite
DF	ENG	George Howe
DF	ENG	Donald Hunter
DF	ENG	Lol Morgan
DF	ENG	Jack Percival
DF	ENG	Henry Stewart

Pos.	Nation	Player
DF	ENG	Bill Whittaker
MF	SCO	Ian Duthie
MF	ENG	Joe Lynn
MF	EIR	Johnny McKenna
MF	ENG	Vic Metcalfe
MF	ENG	Harry Yates
FW	ENG	Ronnie Burke
FW	ENG	Jimmy Glazzard
FW	ENG	Harold Hassall
FW	ENG	Albert Nightingale
FW	ENG	Arnold Rodgers
FW	ENG	Conway Smith

== Review ==
After Arnold Rodgers' goal in the final match of the previous season, some were wondering how Town would cope in Division 1 as they headed into the 1950s. The season didn't start too well with Town only winning 1 of their first 10 matches, that being a 2–1 win over Charlton Athletic, but that run also included a 7–1 defeat by Wolverhampton Wanderers.

Town's form would never dramatically improve, which led Town to another relegation battle, but an improvement saw Town finish in the more respectable position of 15th place. This was also the season that Town played 2 matches at Elland Road, the home of rivals Leeds United, because of a fire at Leeds Road after the game against Manchester United.

== Squad at the end of the season ==
Note: Flags indicate national team as defined under FIFA eligibility rules; some limited exceptions apply. Players may hold more than one non-FIFA nationality.

Pos.	Nation	Player
GK	ENG	Bob Hesford
GK	ENG	Harry Mills
GK	ENG	Jack Wheeler
DF	ENG	John Battye
DF	ENG	Eddie Boot
DF	EIR	Charlie Gallogly
DF	ENG	George Hepplewhite
DF	ENG	George Howe
DF	ENG	Jack Howe
DF	ENG	Donald Hunter
DF	ENG	Don McEvoy
DF	ENG	Lol Morgan
DF	ENG	Jack Percival
DF	ENG	Henry Stewart

Pos.	Nation	Player
DF	ENG	Bill Whittaker
MF	SCO	Ian Duthie
MF	ENG	Joe Lynn
MF	EIR	Johnny McKenna
MF	ENG	Vic Metcalfe
MF	ENG	Ray Taylor
MF	ENG	Harry Yates
FW	ENG	Ronnie Burke
FW	ENG	Jimmy Glazzard
FW	ENG	Harold Hassall
FW	ENG	Albert Nightingale
FW	ENG	Conway Smith
FW	ENG	Jeff Taylor

== Results ==
=== Division One ===
Date	Opponents	Home/ Away	Result F–A	Scorers	Attendance	Position
20 August 1949	Blackpool	A	1–4	Burke	29,712	16th
24 August 1949	Fulham	H	2–2	Nightingale, Hassall	21,805	17th
27 August 1949	Middlesbrough	H	2–2	Hassall, Burke	22,711	19th
31 August 1949	Fulham	A	1–4	Hassall	30,000	21st
3 September 1949	Everton	A	0–3		43,009	21st
7 September 1949	Charlton Athletic	H	2–1	Burke, Glazzard	15,489	21st
10 September 1949	Arsenal	H	2–2	Burke, Glazzard	20,882	20th
14 September 1949	Charlton Athletic	A	2–2	Rodgers (2)	18,821	18th
17 September 1949	Portsmouth	H	0–1		26,222	20th
24 September 1949	Wolverhampton Wanderers	A	1–7	Metcalfe	45,559	21st
1 October 1949	Aston Villa	H	1–0	Nightingale	20,636	20th
8 October 1949	Bolton Wanderers	A	2–1	McEvoy, Metcalfe	31,048	15th
15 October 1949	Birmingham City	H	1–0	Glazzard	22,872	13th
22 October 1949	Derby County	A	2–4	McEvoy, McKenna	23,624	16th
29 October 1949	West Bromwich Albion	H	1–1	Glazzard	22,461	16th
5 November 1949	Manchester United	A	0–6		40,295	16th
12 November 1949	Chelsea	H	1–2	J. Taylor	12,565	18th
19 November 1949	Stoke City	A	0–0		22,473	18th
26 November 1949	Burnley	H	1–2	J. Taylor	19,154	20th
3 December 1949	Sunderland	A	1–1	J. Taylor	33,951	19th
10 December 1949	Liverpool	H	3–2	J. Taylor, Metcalfe (pen), McKenna	25,767	17th
17 December 1949	Blackpool	H	0–1		28,107	18th
24 December 1949	Middlesbrough	A	0–3		33,424	19th
26 December 1949	Manchester City	H	1–0	Burke	29,989	16th
27 December 1949	Manchester City	A	2–1	Glazzard, Hassall	45,000	16th
31 December 1949	Everton	H	1–2	Metcalfe (pen)	24,277	16th
14 January 1950	Arsenal	A	0–1		46,815	17th
21 January 1950	Portsmouth	A	0–4		29,746	19th
4 February 1950	Wolverhampton Wanderers	H	1–0	Metcalfe	16,736	18th
18 February 1950	Aston Villa	A	1–2	J. Taylor	24,560	18th
25 February 1950	Bolton Wanderers	H	2–0	Nightingale, J. Howe (pen)	12,352	18th
4 March 1950	Birmingham City	A	1–2	Nightingale	26,230	18th
11 March 1950	Stoke City	H	4–0	McKenna, J. Taylor (2), Nightingale	18,702	17th
18 March 1950	Burnley	A	0–1		19,960	18th
25 March 1950	Manchester United	H	3–1	Crompton (og), Metcalfe (2, 1 pen)	34,348	16th
1 April 1950	Chelsea	A	1–3	Nightingale	32,064	18th
7 April 1950	Newcastle United	A	0–0		46,886	18th
8 April 1950	Derby County	H	2–0	J. Taylor (2)	30,147	16th
11 April 1950	Newcastle United	H	1–2	Metcalfe	37,766	17th
15 April 1950	West Bromwich Albion	A	0–0		28,240	17th
22 April 1950	Sunderland	H	3–1	J. Taylor, Metcalfe (2, 1 pen)	31,743	15th
3 May 1950	Liverpool	A	3–2	J. Taylor, Nightingale, Metcalfe	35,763	15th

=== FA Cup ===
Date	Round	Opponents	Home/ Away	Result F–A	Scorers	Attendance
7 January 1950	Round 3	Sunderland	A	0–6		55,097

== Appearances and goals ==
Name	Nationality	Position	League		FA Cup		Total	
Name	Nationality	Position	Apps	Goals	Apps	Goals	Apps	Goals
John Battye	England	DF	22	0	0	0	22	0
Eddie Boot	England	DF	38	0	1	0	39	0
Tom Briggs	England	DF	4	0	0	0	4	0
Ronnie Burke	England	FW	12	5	0	0	12	5
Ian Duthie	Scotland	MF	1	0	0	0	1	0
Charlie Gallogly	Ireland	DF	15	0	0	0	15	0
Jimmy Glazzard	England	FW	21	5	1	0	22	5
Harold Hassall	England	FW	10	4	1	0	11	4
Bill Hayes	Republic of Ireland	DF	17	0	1	0	18	0
George Hepplewhite	England	DF	36	0	1	0	37	0
Bob Hesford	England	GK	6	0	0	0	6	0
George Howe	England	DF	5	0	0	0	5	0
Jack Howe	England	DF	20	1	1	0	21	1
Donald Hunter	England	DF	7	0	0	0	7	0
Joe Lynn	England	MF	5	0	0	0	5	0
Don McEvoy	England	DF	5	2	0	0	5	2
Johnny McKenna	Ireland	MF	40	3	1	0	41	3
Vic Metcalfe	England	MF	41	11	1	0	42	11
Harry Mills	England	GK	34	0	1	0	35	0
Lol Morgan	England	DF	6	0	0	0	6	0
Albert Nightingale	England	MF	39	7	1	0	40	7
Jack Percival	England	DF	7	0	0	0	7	0
Arnold Rodgers	England	FW	4	2	0	0	4	2
Conway Smith	England	MF	10	0	0	0	10	0
Henry Stewart	England	DF	15	0	0	0	15	0
Jeff Taylor	England	FW	21	11	0	0	21	11
Ray Taylor	England	MF	2	0	0	0	2	0
Jack Wheeler	England	GK	2	0	0	0	2	0
Bill Whittaker	England	DF	16	0	0	0	16	0
Harry Yates	England	MF	1	0	0	0	1	0
