= 1945–46 Huddersfield Town A.F.C. season =

Huddersfield Town
1945–46 season
- Chairman: Philip Wood
- Manager: David Steele
- Stadium: Leeds Road
- Wartime League North: 15th
- FA Cup: Third round (eliminated by Sheffield United)
- Top goalscorer: League: Billy Price (22); All: Billy Price (23)
- Highest home attendance: 21,170 vs Sheffield United (5 January 1946)
- Lowest home attendance: 4,622 vs Leeds United (27 April 1946)
- Biggest win: 7–0 vs Middlesbrough (13 October 1945)
- Biggest defeat: 2–6 vs Stoke City (27 October 1945)

Huddersfield Town's 1945–46 campaign was mainly played in the still active Wartime League, but the FA Cup was revived for the 1945–46 season in a two-leg format. Town went out in the third round to Sheffield United.

== Players used during the two legs ==
Note: Flags indicate national team as defined under FIFA eligibility rules; some limited exceptions apply. Players may hold more than one non-FIFA nationality.

Pos.	Nation	Player
GK	ENG	Don Clegg
DF	ENG	Graham Bailey
DF	ENG	Jeff Barker
DF	ENG	George Green
DF	ENG	George Howe
DF	ENG	Arthur Morton
DF	ENG	John Simpson

Pos.	Nation	Player
MF	ENG	Albert Bateman
MF	ENG	Eddie Carr
MF	ENG	Vic Metcalfe
FW	ENG	Jimmy Glazzard
FW	ENG	Joe Poole
FW	ENG	Billy Price

== Review ==
It was the first and so far, only season in which a 2-leg system was used in the competition. Town were out in Round 3 with a 1–1 draw at Leeds Road, followed by a 2–0 loss at Bramall Lane, which made them lose 3–1 on aggregate.

== Results ==
=== Wartime League North ===
Pos	Team	Pld	W	D	L	GF	GA	GR	Pts
13	Stoke City	42	18	6	18	88	79	1.114	42
14	Bradford	42	17	6	19	71	84	0.845	40
15	Huddersfield Town	42	17	4	21	90	89	1.011	38
16	Burnley	42	13	10	19	63	84	0.750	36
17	Grimsby Town	42	13	9	20	61	89	0.685	35

Source: rsssf.com

Date	Opponents	Home/ Away	Result F–A	Scorers	Attendance
25 August 1945	Manchester United	H	3–2	Rodgers (2), Boot	7,672
1 September 1945	Manchester United	A	3–2	Rodgers (2), Carr	28,000
8 September 1945	Sunderland	A	2–0	Rodgers, Poole	26,000
12 September 1945	Bradford Park Avenue	A	2–2	Danskin (og), Glazzard	10,868
15 September 1945	Sunderland	H	4–1	Boot (pen), Rodgers (2), Willingham	12,555
22 September 1945	Sheffield United	H	1–4	Rodgers	10,435
29 September 1945	Sheffield United	A	1–4	Carr	23,415
6 October 1945	Middlesbrough	A	8–2	Brook (3), Glazzard (2), Carr (2), Watson	14,654
13 October 1945	Middlesbrough	H	7–0	Bateman, Carr (2), Rodgers (2), Watson (pen), Glazzard	10,436
20 October 1945	Stoke City	H	3–1	Glazzard, Rodgers (2)	11,493
27 October 1945	Stoke City	A	2–6	Price (2)	20,000
3 November 1945	Grimsby Town	A	3–5	Glazzard (2), Rodgers	10,275
10 November 1945	Grimsby Town	H	3–2	Price (2), Watson	10,744
17 November 1945	Blackpool	H	2–4	Bateman, Price	16,378
24 November 1945	Blackpool	A	0–1		15,000
1 December 1945	Liverpool	A	1–4	Hughes (og)	30,000
8 December 1945	Liverpool	H	3–1	Carr (2), Price	10,362
15 December 1945	Bury	H	3–0	Glazzard, Poole, Price	9,293
22 December 1945	Bury	A	1–2	Carr	7,612
25 December 1945	Blackburn Rovers	A	6–1	Carr (3), Boot, Price, Poole	15,072
26 December 1945	Blackburn Rovers	H	0–2		17,657
29 December 1945	Bradford Park Avenue	H	1–1	Glazzard	14,283
1 January 1946	Manchester City	A	2–3	Price (2)	25,490
12 January 1946	Newcastle United	H	1–4	Price	11,423
19 January 1946	Newcastle United	A	1–4	Price	34,877
26 January 1946	Burnley	A	3–4	Green, Price (2)	12,000
2 February 1946	Sheffield Wednesday	H	3–2	Price, Carr (2)	8,912
4 February 1946	Sheffield Wednesday	A	0–3		12,000
16 February 1946	Burnley	H	4–2	Price (3), Watson	8,851
23 February 1946	Chesterfield	H	1–2	Price	11,370
2 March 1946	Chesterfield	A	0–0		12,000
9 March 1946	Barnsley	H	2–1	Boot (pen), Bateman	18,161
16 March 1946	Barnsley	H	0–1		18,000
23 March 1946	Everton	H	0–1		15,664
30 March 1946	Everton	A	2–5	Glazzard, Carr	40,000
6 April 1946	Bolton Wanderers	A	1–2	Brook	15,000
13 April 1946	Bolton Wanderers	H	1–1	Barker	11,996
20 April 1946	Leeds United	A	2–3	Carr, Boot	15,000
22 April 1946	Preston North End	A	0–2		15,000
23 April 1946	Preston North End	H	2–0	Poole, Baxter	9,099
27 April 1946	Leeds United	H	3–2	Carr (2), Watson	4,622
4 May 1946	Manchester City	H	3–0	Price (3)	8,781

=== FA Cup ===
Date	Round	Opponents	Home/ Away	Result F – A	Scorers	Attendance
5 January 1946	Round 3 1st Leg	Sheffield United	H	1–1	Price	21,170
7 January 1946	Round 3 2nd Leg	Sheffield United	A	0–2		32,100: Huddersfield lost 3–1 on aggregate.

== FA Cup appearances and goals ==
Name	Nationality	Position	FA Cup		Total	
Name	Nationality	Position	Apps	Goals	Apps	Goals
Graham Bailey	England	DF	2	0	2	0
Jeff Barker	England	DF	2	0	2	0
Albert Bateman	England	MF	2	0	2	0
Eddie Carr	England	MF	1	0	1	0
Don Clegg	England	GK	2	0	2	0
Jimmy Glazzard	England	FW	2	0	2	0
George Green	England	DF	2	0	2	0
George Howe	England	DF	1	0	1	0
Vic Metcalfe	England	MF	1	0	1	0
Arthur Morton	England	DF	2	0	2	0
Joe Poole	England	FW	1	0	1	0
Billy Price	England	FW	2	1	2	1
John Simpson	England	DF	2	0	2	0
