= 1943–44 Huddersfield Town A.F.C. season =

Huddersfield Town
1943–44 season
- Chairman: Philip Wood
- Manager: Ted Magner
- Stadium: Leeds Road
- Wartime League North: 6th (1st NRL Competition); 37th (War Cup Qualifiers); 32nd (2nd NRL Competition)
- Top goalscorer: League: All: Billy Price (46)
- Highest home attendance: 7,792 vs Leeds United (25 December 1943)
- Lowest home attendance: 1,810 vs Leeds United (22 January 1944)
- Biggest win: 8–0 vs Crewe Alexandra (6 November 1943)
- Biggest defeat: 1–4 vs Barnsley (11 September 1943); 1–4 vs Halifax Town (27 November 1943); 1–4 vs Barnsley (12 February 1944); 1–4 vs Halifax Town (25 March 1944); 1–4 vs Halifax Town (29 April 1944)

Huddersfield Town's 1943–44 campaign saw Town continuing to play in the Wartime League. They finished 6th in the 1st NRL Competition, 37th in the War Cup qualifiers and 32nd in the 2nd NRL Competition.

== Results ==
=== 1st NRL Competition ===
Date	Opponents	Home/Away	Result F–A	Scorers	Attendance
28 August 1943	Bradford (Park Avenue)	H	7–4	Baird, Price (4), Watson (pen), Barclay	2,578
4 September 1943	Bradford (Park Avenue)	A	2–1	Watson, Barclay	4,957
11 September 1943	Barnsley	H	1–4	Watson	2,642
18 September 1943	Barnsley	A	2–1	Barclay, Price	5,264
25 September 1943	Sunderland	H	4–0	Price (2), Isaac, Barclay	5,734
2 October 1943	Sunderland	A	2–3	Isaac, Price	9,500
9 October 1943	Newcastle United	A	2–5	Price, Storey	10,400
16 October 1943	Newcastle United	H	1–1	Watson	4,268
23 October 1943	Bradford City	A	3–1	Glazzard, Price, Poole	5,260
30 October 1943	Bradford City	H	2–1	Baird, Price	3,233
6 November 1943	Crewe Alexandra	H	8–0	Price (7), Glazzard	3,278
13 November 1943	Crewe Alexandra	A	1–0	Price	2,500
20 November 1943	Halifax Town	H	0–0		3,416
27 November 1943	Halifax Town	A	1–4	Boot	4,000
4 December 1943	Bolton Wanderers	H	2–0	Poole, Price	3,091
11 December 1943	Bolton Wanderers	A	4–0	Price (4)	4,125
18 December 1943	Leeds United	A	3–0	Price (2), Baird	5,000
25 December 1943	Leeds United	H	3–0	Calverley (3)	7,792

=== 2nd NRL Competition ===
The first 10 matches of this competition took part in the War Cup qualifiers. The last 10 matches took place in the Combined Counties Cup.

Date	Opponents	Home/Away	Result F–A	Scorers	Attendance
27 December 1943	York City	A	1–2	Price	8,475
1 January 1944	York City	H	0–3		4,184
8 January 1944	Bradford (Park Avenue)	H	1–2	Glazzard	5,359
15 January 1944	Bradford (Park Avenue)	A	1–1	Isaac	6,569: Match abandoned at half-time due to fog, but result was allowed to stand.
22 January 1944	Leeds United	H	4–1	Price (2), Baird (2)	1,810
29 January 1944	Leeds United	A	0–2		8,000
5 February 1944	Barnsley	H	2–2	Price (2)	4,872
12 February 1944	Barnsley	A	1–4	Price	7,652
19 February 1944	Bradford City	H	2–0	Barclay, Price	2,382
26 February 1944	Bradford City	A	4–2	Barclay, Price (2), R. Rae (og)	2,437
4 March 1944	Chesterfield	H	4–0	Price (2), Bateman, Calverley	1,858
11 March 1944	Chesterfield	A	0–2		2,000
18 March 1944	Halifax Town	H	2–1	Boot, Thompson	3,001
25 March 1944	Halifax Town	A	1–4	Poole	3,000
1 April 1944	Bradford City	A	0–3		2,600
8 April 1944	Bradford City	H	5–0	Glazzard, Price (2), Isaac, Barclay	2,412
10 April 1944	Sheffield Wednesday	A	2–2	Baird, Isaac	10,000
15 April 1944	Sheffield Wednesday	A	1–2	Isaac	9,230
22 April 1944	Sheffield Wednesday	H	5–1	Price (4), Baird	3,448
29 April 1944	Halifax Town	H	1–4	Price	4,293
6 May 1944	Halifax Town	A	4–2	Glazzard, Baird, Price (2)	5,537
