= 1942–43 Huddersfield Town A.F.C. season =

Huddersfield Town
1942–43 season
- Chairman: Philip Wood
- Manager: Ted Magner
- Stadium: Leeds Road
- Wartime League North: 5th (1st NRL Competition); 6th (War Cup Qualifiers); 8th (2nd NRL Competition)
- Top goalscorer: League: All: Billy Price (38)
- Highest home attendance: 8,813 vs Bradford Park Avenue (13 March 1943)
- Lowest home attendance: 1,513 vs Barnsley (5 September 1942)
- Biggest win: 5–0 vs Middlesbrough (13 February 1943); 5–0 vs Barnsley (27 March 1943)
- Biggest defeat: 1–6 vs Barnsley (28 August 1942)

Huddersfield Town's 1942–43 campaign saw Town continuing to play in the Wartime League. They finished 5th in the 1st NRL Competition, 6th in the War Cup qualifiers and 8th in the 2nd NRL Competition.

== Results ==
=== 1st NRL Competition ===
Date	Opponents	Home/Away	Result F–A	Scorers	Attendance
28 August 1942	Barnsley	A	1–6	Duffy	3,400
5 September 1942	Barnsley	H	3–3	Thompson, Price (2)	1,513
12 September 1942	Newcastle United	H	4–0	Mortenson (2), Price (2)	2,475
19 September 1942	Newcastle United	A	4–0	Boot, Wilkinson (2), Price	8,000
26 September 1942	Sunderland	A	3–1	Watson, Price, Thompson	3,000
3 October 1942	Sunderland	H	2–2	Boot (pen), Price	3,490
10 October 1942	Gateshead	A	4–3	Poole, Baird, Watson, Wilkinson	3,000
17 October 1942	Gateshead	H	2–1	McKellor, Barclay	2,252
24 October 1942	Middlesbrough	A	2–2	Willingham, Poole	2,500
31 October 1942	Middlesbrough	H	4–1	Price (2), Watson, Boot (pen)	3,155
7 November 1942	Crewe Alexandra	A	1–1	Price	4,860
14 November 1942	Crewe Alexandra	H	4–0	Price, Barclay, Baird, Watson	2,071
21 November 1942	Halifax Town	A	1–2	Price	4,000
28 November 1942	Halifax Town	H	4–1	Price (2), Barclay, Thompson	3,033
5 December 1942	Bradford City	A	3–3	Baird, S. Smith (og), Barclay	1,043
12 December 1942	Bradford City	H	3–2	Watson (3)	2,533
19 December 1942	Leeds United	H	4–1	Boot (pen), Price (3)	2,286
25 December 1942	Leeds United	A	3–3	Price (2), Isaac	4,000

=== 2nd NRL Competition ===
The first 9 matches of this competition took part in the War Cup qualifiers. The last 7 matches, with the exception of the match against Manchester City, took place in the Combined Counties Cup.

Date	Opponents	Home/Away	Result F – A	Scorers	Attendance
26 December 1942	Bradford (Park Avenue)	H			Match abandoned due to fog and never re-arranged.
2 January 1943	Bradford (Park Avenue)	A	3–2	Poole, Barclay, Price	4,062
9 January 1943	Leeds United	A	4–2	Barclay (2), Watson, Price	1,000
16 January 1943	Leeds United	H	4–1	Price (3), Baird	3,178
23 January 1943	Barnsley	A	2–3	Price (2)	5,000
30 January 1943	Barnsley	H	4–0	Boot (pen), Price, Watson, Barclay	5,000
6 February 1943	Middlesbrough	A	2–1	Price, Barclay	2,000
13 February 1943	Middlesbrough	H	5–0	Barclay (3), Price, Watson	3,544
20 February 1943	Doncaster Rovers	H	6–2	Juliussen (3), Baird, Barclay, Willingham	3,635
27 February 1943	Doncaster Rovers	A	1–3	Baird	3,500
6 March 1943	Bradford (Park Avenue)	A	0–0		8,440
13 March 1943	Bradford (Park Avenue)	H	2–3	Watson (2)	8,813
20 March 1943	Barnsley	A	1–2	Barclay	2,000
27 March 1943	Barnsley	H	5–0	Price (3), Baird, W. Jones (og)	2,000
3 April 1943	Halifax Town	H	1–0	Barclay	3,430
10 April 1943	Halifax Town	A	2–0	Price, Watson	3,000
17 April 1943	Newcastle United	H	1–0	Price	2,835
24 April 1943	Newcastle United	A	2–2	Price (2)	14,000
26 April 1943	Manchester City	A	1–1	Watson (pen)	4,000
1 May 1943	Sunderland	A	2–6	Price (2)	8,000
8 May 1943	Sunderland	H	4–1	Watson (3, 1 pen), Rickett	2,626
