= Peter Doherty (footballer) =

Northern Irish footballer and manager

Personal information
- Full name: Peter Dermot Doherty
- Date of birth: 5 June 1913
- Place of birth: Magherafelt, County Londonderry, Ireland
- Date of death: 6 April 1990 (aged 76)
- Place of death: Poulton-le-Fylde, Lancashire, England
- Height: 5 ft 11 in (1.80 m)
- Position: Inside left

Youth career
- 1926–1930: Station United

Senior career*
| Years | Team | Apps | (Gls) |
| 1930–1931 | Coleraine | | |
| 1931–1933 | Glentoran | | |
| 1933–1936 | Blackpool | 82 | (28) |
| 1936–1945 | Manchester City | 119 | (74) |
| 1945–1946 | Derby County | 15 | (7) |
| 1946–1949 | Huddersfield Town | 83 | (33) |
| 1949–1953 | Doncaster Rovers | 103 | (56) |
| Total | | 402 | (198) |

International career
| 1935–1950 | Ireland (IFA) | 16 | (3) |

Managerial career
- 1949–1958: Doncaster Rovers
- 1951–1962: Northern Ireland
- 1958–1960: Bristol City
- * Club domestic league appearances and goals

Peter Dermot Doherty (5 June 1913 – 6 April 1990) was a Northern Irish international footballer and manager.

An inside-left, he was one of the top players of his time, gaining 16 caps for Ireland (IFA). He played for Coleraine and Glentoran, winning the Irish Cup with Glentoran in 1933, before winning a move to English club Blackpool later in the year. He was sold to Manchester City in February 1936 for a fee of £10,000 and helped the club to win the First Division title for the first time in the 1936–37 season. The outbreak of World War II cost him the chance to play competitive football during his peak years, and he was transferred to Derby County as the war drew to a close. He won the FA Cup with Derby, scoring in the 1946 FA Cup final victory over Charlton Athletic. He moved on to Huddersfield Town later in the year.

In April 1949, he was appointed player-manager of Doncaster Rovers. He was also top-scorer as the club won the Third Division North title during the 1949–50 season. The club then spent the next seven seasons in the Second Division before he resigned in January 1958. He also worked as Northern Ireland's first national team manager from October 1951 to May 1962. He used his position to help Doncaster sign talented Irish players whilst helping his nation qualify for the 1958 FIFA World Cup, where they reached the quarter-finals. He spent 1958 to 1960 as Bristol City manager. He later scouted for Liverpool and was in the first group of 22 players to be inducted into the English Football Hall of Fame.

== Playing career ==
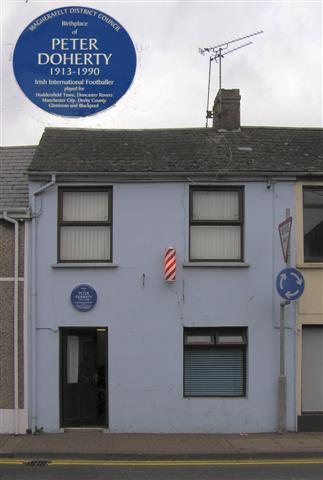
A plaque marks the birthplace of Doherty in Magherafelt.

Doherty (left), in his Manchester City days, shaking hands with Jimmy Hampson, of his first club, Blackpool, in the late 1930s. The two were former teammates at Blackpool.

Born in Magherafelt, County Londonderry, Doherty began his career with Glentoran in the Irish League. He worked first as a bricklayer and then as a bus conductor. After helping Glentoran to the 1933 Irish Cup, early in the 1933–34 season Doherty joined English club Blackpool for a £2,000 fee, at the age of 19. He joined Manchester City on 19 February 1936 for a then-club record of £10,000. Blackpool needed the money urgently, and Doherty was summoned from his lunch to report to Bloomfield Road. The Irishman tried hard to persuade Blackpool directors that he did not wish to leave the club, for he was due to marry a local girl and had just bought a new house in the town. The fee was an exceptionally high transfer fee for the period; it came within £1,000 of the British record. Doherty's Manchester City debut, against Preston North End, was not a successful one. Tightly man-marked by Bill Shankly throughout, he failed to make an impact, leading to one catcall from the crowd of "Ten thousand pounds? More like ten thousand cigarette cards". Doherty later described the remainder of his first Manchester City season as "uneventful", but his second was to be anything but.

Manchester City started the 1936–37 season poorly and were in the bottom half of the table until December. Occasional big wins, including a 6–2 defeat of West Bromwich Albion and a 4–1 defeat of Everton, were mixed with extended barren runs; at one point the club gained just one win in twelve matches. However, Doherty was scoring goals regularly. A goal in a 5–3 Christmas day loss to Grimsby Town was his twelfth of the season. Christmas proved to be a turning point for the club, as a win against Middlesbrough the following day was the start of a long unbeaten run. By April, Manchester City were second in the table and faced a fixture against Arsenal, league leaders and the dominant club of the period. Doherty scored the first goal in a 2–0 win, and City reached the top of the table. The unbeaten run continued until the end of the season, and City secured their first league championship with a 4–1 win over Sheffield Wednesday. With 30 league goals, Doherty was the club's leading scorer, helped by a run of eleven goals in seven games as the season drew to a close.

Doherty scored 79 goals in 130 appearances at Maine Road. During the Second World War years of 1939–1945, Doherty served in the RAF. He remained registered as a Manchester City player, scoring 60 goals in 89 wartime matches, though wartime games are not generally included in official records. He also guested for numerous clubs across the country: Port Vale, Blackburn Rovers, Derby County, Birmingham, Brentford, Grimsby Town, Lincoln City, Liverpool, Manchester United, West Bromwich Albion and Walsall. During a guest appearance for Port Vale in 1945, he famously went to take a penalty, but instead of shooting he laid it off to a teammate who scored.

After the conclusion of the war, he transferred to Derby County, with whom he won the FA Cup, scoring a goal in the final itself as Derby beat Charlton Athletic 4–1 at Wembley Stadium. In December 1946, Doherty moved to David Steele's Huddersfield Town for a fee of over £9,000 after requesting a transfer. Doherty was unhappy with the directors who opposed his plan to secure his future by taking over the Arboretum Hotel and an earlier dispute over FA Cup final tickets. The "Terriers" boasted a powerful front five of Albert Bateman, Jimmy Glazzard, Alf Whittingham, Doherty and Vic Metcalfe. However, a weak defence saw them struggle in the lower reaches of the First Division throughout the 1946–47 season, 1947–48 and 1948–49 seasons. At Leeds Road he scored 33 goals in 83 league appearances, finishing as the "Terriers" top-scorer in his final two seasons under George Stephenson.

In his autobiography, Len Shackleton wrote of Doherty:

"Peter Doherty was surely the genius among geniuses. Possessor of the most baffling body swerve in football, able to perform all the tricks with the ball, owning a shot like the kick of a mule, and, with all this, having such tremendous enthusiasm for the game that he would work like a horse for ninety minutes. That was pipe-smoking Peter Doherty, the Irish redhead who, I am convinced, had enough football skill to stroll through a game smoking that pipe-and still make the other twenty-one players appear second-raters. But of course Peter never strolled through anything. His energy had to be seen to be appreciated."

== Management career ==
=== Doncaster Rovers ===
He made his final move to Doncaster Rovers in April 1949, where he assumed the role of player-manager. He scored 30 goals from 39 games in the 1949–50 season and led "Donny" to promotion as champions of the Third Division North. He was again top-scorer with 14 goals in 23 matches during the 1950–51 season as Rovers posted an 11th-place finish in the Second Division. He then settled more into his management role, helping the club to sign players from his home country such as Len Graham, Harry Gregg and Kit Lawlor, whilst overseeing the development of young players such as Alick Jeffrey. The club spent the next six seasons finishing in the lower half of the Second Division table: 1951–52 (16th), 1952–53 (13th), 1953–54 (12th), 1954–55 (18th) 1955–56 (17th) and 1956–57 (14th). He left Belle Vue when he resigned in January 1958 following several disputes with the club's board of directors; the club went on to be relegated at the end of the 1957–58 season.

=== Northern Ireland ===
He became manager of Northern Ireland between 1951 and 1962, for whom he had 16 caps as a player. He led the country at the 1958 FIFA World Cup in Sweden after they topped their qualification group ahead of Italy and Portugal. At the tournament itself, Northern Ireland qualified for the knockout stages after finishing second in their group, having beaten Czechoslovakia, lost to Argentina and drew with West Germany. Having finished level on points with Czechoslovakia, they then beat the Czechs 2–1 in a play-off game, with Peter McParland scoring a brace at the Malmö Stadion. They were then eliminated after losing 4–0 against France in the quarter-finals.

=== Bristol City ===
He also managed Bristol City from 1958 to 1960. The "Robins" finished tenth in the Second Division at the end of the 1958–59 season and were relegated at the end of the 1959–60 campaign.

=== Preston North End (assistant) ===
From October 1970 to January 1973, he held the position of assistant manager at Preston North End, working alongside Alan Ball Sr who had been appointed Preston's manager during the 1970 close season. In this role, he was immediately successful, with Preston becoming Third Division champions at their first attempt in the 1970–71 season.

=== Style of management ===
His coaching techniques were revolutionary at the time. He emphasised ball practice, and instead of endless laps of the pitch, Doherty suggested volleyball "to promote jumping, timing and judgement"; basketball "to encourage split-second decision-making and finding space"; and walking football, "to build up calf muscles".

== Later life and death ==
After management, Doherty went into business. He returned to football becoming a scout for Coventry City during the 1967–68 season. In July 1968, Doherty was appointed chief scout at Tommy Cummings' Aston Villa.

In later life he became a scout for Liverpool, helping to unearth such talents as Kevin Keegan. He and Andy Beattie also served Notts County as 'professional advisers' from December 1965 to March 1966, providing council to first-team manager Ernie Coleman. Following his death in 1990, there is a plaque to mark his birthplace in Magherafelt.

== Career statistics ==
=== Club statistics ===
Appearances and goals by club, season and competition
| Club | Season | League | | | FA Cup | | Total | |
| Club | Season | Division | Apps | Goals | Apps | Goals | Apps | Goals |
|---|---|---|---|---|---|---|---|---|
| Blackpool | 1933–34 | Second Division | 19 | 4 | 2 | 1 | 21 | 5 |
| Blackpool | 1934–35 | Second Division | 35 | 13 | 1 | 0 | 36 | 13 |
| Blackpool | 1935–36 | Second Division | 28 | 11 | 2 | 0 | 30 | 11 |
| Blackpool | Total | | 82 | 28 | 5 | 1 | 87 | 29 |
| Manchester City | 1935–36 | First Division | 9 | 4 | 0 | 0 | 9 | 4 |
| Manchester City | 1936–37 | First Division | 41 | 30 | 4 | 2 | 45 | 32 |
| Manchester City | 1937–38 | First Division | 41 | 23 | 5 | 2 | 46 | 25 |
| Manchester City | 1938–39 | Second Division | 28 | 17 | 2 | 1 | 30 | 18 |
| Manchester City | Total | | 119 | 74 | 11 | 5 | 130 | 79 |
| Derby County | 1945–46 | | 0 | 0 | 10 | 10 | 10 | 10 |
| Derby County | 1946–47 | First Division | 15 | 7 | 2 | 0 | 17 | 7 |
| Derby County | Total | | 15 | 7 | 12 | 10 | 27 | 17 |
| Huddersfield Town | 1946–47 | First Division | 19 | 7 | 1 | 2 | 20 | 9 |
| Huddersfield Town | 1947–48 | First Division | 38 | 13 | 1 | 0 | 39 | 13 |
| Huddersfield Town | 1948–49 | First Division | 26 | 13 | 2 | 1 | 28 | 14 |
| Huddersfield Town | Total | | 83 | 33 | 4 | 3 | 87 | 36 |
| Doncaster Rovers | 1949–50 | Third Division North | 35 | 27 | 4 | 3 | 39 | 30 |
| Doncaster Rovers | 1950–51 | Second Division | 23 | 14 | 0 | 0 | 23 | 14 |
| Doncaster Rovers | 1951–52 | Second Division | 16 | 6 | 1 | 0 | 17 | 6 |
| Doncaster Rovers | 1952–53 | Second Division | 29 | 9 | 1 | 0 | 30 | 9 |
| Doncaster Rovers | Total | | 103 | 56 | 6 | 3 | 109 | 59 |
| Career total | | | 402 | 198 | 38 | 22 | 440 | 220 |

=== International statistics ===
Ireland national team
| Year | Apps | Goals |
|---|---|---|
| 1935 | 4 | 0 |
| 1936 | 1 | 0 |
| 1937 | 3 | 1 |
| 1938 | 1 | 0 |
| 1939 | 1 | 0 |
| 1946 | 1 | 0 |
| 1947 | 2 | 3 |
| 1948 | 2 | 0 |
| 1949 | 0 | 0 |
| 1950 | 1 | 0 |
| Total | 16 | 4 |

=== Managerial statistics ===
Managerial record by team and tenure
| Team | From | To | Record | | | | | Ref. |
| Team | From | To | G | W | D | L | Win % | Ref. |
|---|---|---|---|---|---|---|---|---|
| Doncaster Rovers | 18 May 1949 | 17 January 1958 | 388 | 133 | 108 | 147 | 34.28 | |
| Northern Ireland | 6 October 1951 | 9 May 1962 | 51 | 9 | 14 | 28 | 17.65 | |
| Bristol City | 17 January 1958 | 1 March 1960 | 95 | 33 | 14 | 48 | 34.74 | |
| Career total | | | 534 | 175 | 136 | 223 | 32.77 | — |

== Honours ==
=== As a player ===
Glentoran

- Irish Cup: 1932–33

Manchester City

- Football League First Division: 1936–37

Derby County

- FA Cup: 1945–46

Awards

- English Football Hall of Fame: inducted 2002
- Manchester City Hall of Fame: inducted 2004

=== As a player-manager ===
Doncaster Rovers

- Football League Third Division North: 1949–50
