= 1944–45 Huddersfield Town A.F.C. season =

Huddersfield Town
1944–45 season
- Chairman: Philip Wood
- Manager: David Steele
- Stadium: Leeds Road
- Wartime League North: 1st (1st NRL Competition); 34th (War Cup Qualifiers); 13th (2nd NRL Competition)
- Top goalscorer: League: All: Billy Price (40)
- Highest home attendance: 17,253 vs Newcastle United (23 December 1944)
- Lowest home attendance: 2,007 vs Middlesbrough (28 April 1945)
- Biggest win: 6–1 vs Oldham Athletic (10 February 1945); 6–1 vs Hartlepools United (7 April 1945)
- Biggest defeat: 0–5 vs Bradford (Park Avenue) (17 March 1945)

Huddersfield Town's 1944–45 campaign saw Town continuing to play in the Wartime League. They finished 1st in the 1st NRL Competition, 34th in the War Cup qualifiers and 13th in the 2nd NRL Competition.

== Results ==
=== 1st NRL Competition ===
Date	Opponents	Home/ Away	Result F–A	Scorers	Attendance
26 August 1944	Barnsley	A	2–1	Price, Bateman	6,500
2 September 1944	Barnsley	H	2–1	Price (2)	4,049
9 September 1944	York City	H	2–1	Price, Glazzard	4,885
16 September 1944	York City	A	3–1	Price (2), Glazzard	5,251
23 September 1944	Darlington	A	3–2	Price (2), Poole	9,857
30 September 1944	Darlington	H	1–2	Watson	6,419
7 October 1944	Gateshead	H	4–0	Price (2), Glazzard, Green	4,263
14 October 1944	Gateshead	A	6–2	Bateman (2), Price (3), Glazzard	3,000
21 October 1944	Bradford (Park Avenue)	A	2–2	Glazzard, Price	15,628
28 October 1944	Bradford (Park Avenue)	H	1–1	Baird	13,130
4 November 1944	Sunderland	H	3–0	Glazzard (2), Price	11,432
11 November 1944	Sunderland	A	2–2	Baird, Price	20,000
18 November 1944	Middlesbrough	A	1–0	Boot	6,700
25 November 1944	Middlesbrough	H	5–1	Watson, Price, Robinson (og), Poole, Glazzard	7,532
2 December 1944	Leeds United	H	4–2	Price (2), JW Birch (og), Glazzard	7,880
9 December 1944	Leeds United	A	3–2	Bateman (2), Glazzard	14,000
16 December 1944	Newcastle United	A	2–1	Bateman, Price	22,000
23 December 1944	Newcastle United	H	4–1	Boot, Glazzard, Price, Watson	17,253

=== 2nd NRL Competition ===
Date	Opponents	Home/ Away	Result F–A	Scorers	Attendance
25 December 1944	Halifax Town	H	0–0		11,589
26 December 1944	Barnsley	A	1–0	Price	10,933
30 December 1944	Halifax Town	A	2–4	Rodgers (2)	8,000
6 January 1945	Manchester United	A	0–1		8,000
13 January 1945	Manchester United	H	2–2	Bateman, Price	6,146
20 January 1945	Bury	H	2–1	Glazzard, Price	3,976
27 January 1945	Bury	A	3–4	Price (2), Watson	1,588
3 February 1945	Oldham Athletic	A	3–2	Price (3)	6,429
10 February 1945	Oldham Athletic	H	6–1	Baird, Glazzard, Watson (3), Price	7,083
17 February 1945	Manchester City	H	3–1	Glazzard, Price, Watson	12,937
24 February 1945	Manchester City	A	0–2		24,003
3 March 1945	Derby County	H	0–4		13,798
10 March 1945	Derby County	A	1–2	Price	17,428
17 March 1945	Bradford (Park Avenue)	A	0–5		13,032
24 March 1945	York City	A	0–1		3,635
31 March 1945	York City	H	1–0	Rodgers	3,297
2 April 1945	Sheffield United	A	1–3	Price	8,680
7 April 1945	Hartlepools United	A	6–1	Price (5), Glazzard	6,046
14 April 1945	Hartlepools United	H	6–3	Poole (2), Glazzard (2), Price, Rodgers	2,210
21 April 1945	Middlesbrough	A	1–2	Glazzard	6,000
28 April 1945	Middlesbrough	H	2 – 0 (aet: 90 mins: 1 – 0)	Rodgers, Poole	2,007
5 May 1945	Gateshead	A	3–3	Poole, Rodgers, Price	2,000
8 May 1945	Barnsley	A	4–2	Rodgers (2), Mosby, Boot	527
9 May 1945	Barnsley	H	2–1	Shackleton, Rodgers	4,000
12 May 1945	Gateshead	H	2 – 3 (aet: 90 mins: 2 – 2)	Mosby, Shackleton	3,636
19 May 1945	Sunderland	H	1–0	Rodgers	3,696
21 May 1945	Sunderland	A	0–2		13,600
