= George Skelton =

George Skelton may refer to:

- George Skelton (footballer) (1919–1994), English footballer
- George Skelton (politician) (1826–1920), Canadian politician
