= Anton Otulakowski =

English footballer

Personal information
- Full name: Anton Otulakowski
- Date of birth: 29 January 1956 (age 70)
- Place of birth: Dewsbury, England
- Height: 5 ft 9 in (1.75 m)
- Position: Midfielder

Senior career*
Years	Team	Apps	(Gls)
- Ossett Town
1975–1976	Barnsley	42	(2)
1976–1979	West Ham United	17	(0)
1979–1983	Southend United	163	(8)
1983–1986	Millwall	114	(14)
1986–1987	Crystal Palace	12	(1)
–	Hastings Town		
Total		348	(25)
- * Club domestic league appearances and goals

Anton Otulakowski (born 29 January 1956) is an English former footballer who played in the Football League for Barnsley, Crystal Palace, Millwall, Southend United and West Ham United.

Otulakowski was born in Dewsbury. As a youngster he was a successful gymnast and gained England youth international honours but he chose instead to pursue a career in football. He started his League career at Barnsley in Division Four, making his League debut against Hartlepool United in April 1975. He combined his time at Barnsley with working for the Gas Board. In October 1976, he joined West Ham United for £60,000, a record fee received for Barnsley at the time, and made his debut at Old Trafford against Manchester United with The Hammers winning 2–0.

He then joined Southend United in March 1979, where he made 163 League appearances before George Graham signed him for Millwall for a combined total of £60,000 in March 1983, which also included Dave Cusack making the same journey. He won promotion from Division Three in 1985, and was named Player of the Year in 1986.

After a successful spell with Millwall, he signed for Crystal Palace for £19,000 paid for from Palace's Lifeline appeal. After only 12 games, Otulakowski was forced to retire from the professional game due to a persistent knee injury.

== Personal life ==
Otulakowski's father is from Poland and moved to England after World War II.

His uncle, Arthur Thompson played for Huddersfield Town from 1946 to 1949.

== Honours ==
Southend United

- Football League Fourth Division: 1980–81
