= John Barker (English footballer) =

English footballer

Personal information
- Date of birth: 4 July 1948
- Place of birth: Huddersfield, England
- Date of death: December 2004 (aged 56)
- Position: Left back

Youth career
- 19??–1966: Scunthorpe United

Senior career*
Years	Team	Apps	(Gls)
1966–1975	Scunthorpe United	263	(6)
–	Scarborough		
- * Club domestic league appearances and goals

John Barker (4 July 1948 – 2004) was an English professional footballer who made 263 appearances in the Football League playing as a left back for Scunthorpe United.

== Career ==
Barker was born in Huddersfield, the son of former footballer Jeff Barker. He began his career in the youth system of Scunthorpe United, where his father was a member of the backroom staff, and made his debut in the Fourth Division as a 17-year-old, in April 1966 away at Bournemouth. He scored the equalising goal with a diving header against Sheffield Wednesday as Scunthorpe knocked the First Division club out of the 1970 FA Cup. Barker suffered concussion in the act of scoring, took no further part in the match, and was unaware until afterwards that he had scored a goal. He went on to make more than 300 appearances for the club before retiring from professional football at the early age of 27 to take up a post with the Forestry Commission. He also played non-League football for Scarborough. Barker died in December 2004 at the age of 56.
