= Bill Whittaker (footballer) =

English footballer and manager

Personal information
- Full name: William Paul Whittaker
- Date of birth: 20 December 1922
- Place of birth: Charlton, England
- Date of death: 30 August 1977 (aged 54)
- Place of death: Greenwich, England
- Position: Wing half

Youth career
- Arsenal

Senior career*
Years	Team	Apps	(Gls)
1940–1948	Charlton Athletic	28	(0)
- → Clapton Orient (guest)
- → Fulham (guest)
1941	→ West Ham United (guest)	1	(0)
1941–1942	→ Liverpool (guest)	9	(0)
1942	→ Watford (guest)	1	(0)
- → Chelsea (guest)
1942–1946	→ Brentford (guest)	65	(0)
1945	→ Plymouth Argyle (guest)	1	(0)
1948–1950	Huddersfield Town	43	(0)
1950–1951	Crystal Palace	35	(1)
1951–1955	Cambridge United		

International career
1937	England Schoolboys	2	(0)

Managerial career
- 1951–1955: Cambridge United (player-manager)
- * Club domestic league appearances and goals

William Paul Whittaker (20 December 1922 – 30 August 1977) was an English professional footballer who played in the Football League for Charlton Athletic, Huddersfield Town and Crystal Palace as a wing half. He guested for eight additional clubs during the Second World War. Whittaker later played for and managed Eastern Counties League club Cambridge United. At school he was also an outstanding cricketer who Kent wanted to join their nursery.

== Career statistics ==
Appearances and goals by club, season and competition
Club	Season	League			FA Cup		Total	
Club	Season	Division	Apps	Goals	Apps	Goals	Apps	Goals
Charlton Athletic	1946–47	First Division	9	0	1	0	10	0
Charlton Athletic	1947–48	First Division	11	0	0	0	11	0
Charlton Athletic	1948–49	First Division	8	0	―		8	0
Charlton Athletic	Total		28	0	1	0	29	0
Brentford (guest)	1945–46	―			4	0	4	0
Huddersfield Town	1948–49	First Division	27	0	4	0	31	0
Huddersfield Town	1949–50	First Division	16	0	0	0	16	0
Huddersfield Town	Total		43	0	4	0	47	0
Career total			71	0	9	0	80	0

== Honours ==
Charlton Athletic

- FA Cup: 1946–47
