= Albert Nightingale =

English footballer

Personal information
- Full name: Albert Nightingale
- Date of birth: 10 November 1923
- Place of birth: Thrybergh, England
- Date of death: 26 February 2006 (aged 82)
- Place of death: Liverpool, England
- Height: 5 ft 8 in (1.73 m)
- Position: Inside forward

Senior career*
Years	Team	Apps	(Gls)
1941–1948	Sheffield United	62	(15)
1948–1951	Huddersfield Town	119	(20)
1951–1952	Blackburn Rovers	35	(5)
1952–1956	Leeds United	130	(48)
Total		346	(88)
- * Club domestic league appearances and goals

Albert Nightingale (10 November 1923 – 26 February 2006) was a professional footballer who played as an inside forward. He played in the Football League for Sheffield United, Huddersfield Town, Blackburn Rovers and Leeds United, making 346 league appearances in total. He won promotion to the First Division with Leeds United in the 1955–56 season, but retired from injury after playing once during the following season through injury.

== Life and career ==
=== Early life ===
Nightingale was born in Thrybergh, South Yorkshire, England on 10 November 1923, as one of fourteen siblings. He is the uncle of fellow footballer Lol Morgan, who he played alongside at Huddersfield Town. He played wartime football with Sheffield United, Rotherham United, and Chesterfield. Following the end of wartime football, he made 62 league appearances for Sheffield United, in which he scored 15 goals.

=== Huddersfield Town ===
In March 1948, Nightingale joined Huddersfield Town in a swap deal with Graham Bailey and George Hutchinson, with Nightingale having been transfer listed by Sheffield United at his request. He was a popular player amongst the fans during his three-and-a-half years with Huddersfield, across which he made 119 appearances and scored 20 goals for the club.

=== Blackburn Rovers ===
He transferred to Second Division club Blackburn Rovers on 29 September 1951 for a fee of £12,000, and made his debut for the club later that day, at home to Notts County. He was one of many signings made by a relegation-threatened Blackburn after a poor start to the 1951–52 season, and the club would eventually finish 14th. He continued to live in Huddersfield following his transfer to Blackburn, and handed in a transfer request in September 1953 season, having struggled to settle in at the club. He scored five times in 35 league matches during his spell with the club.

=== Leeds United ===
Nightingale signed for Leeds United in October 1952, for a fee of £10,000. The fee made him the club's most expensive transfer at the time of his signing. He made his debut for the club on 11 October, scoring Leeds' goal in a 2–1 away defeat to Sheffield United on 11 October, and went on to score 8 goals in 27 matches across the 1952–53 season. He scored 17 in 39 league matches in the 1953–54 season, and 13 in 38 league matches in the 1954–55 season. He was part of the Leeds team who won promotion to the First Division in the 1955–56 season, scoring 10 goals in 26 Second Division matches as Leeds finished second on 52 points.

He played Leeds' opening match of the 1956–57 season, but suffered a knee injury which he was hospitalised for, and did not play again. He declined a knee operation which "only had a faint chance of prolonging his career, and announced his retirement from football in December 1956.

== After football ==
After the end of his playing career, he worked as a storeman in an electrical company and then he became a green-keeper at Woodsome Hall Golf Club until retirement. He died on 26 February 2006, aged 82, after being taken ill at his daughters home in Liverpool.

== Style of play ==
Nightingale played as an inside forward. He was noted as a hard-working player and liked to make direct forward runs. He had a reputation for diving to win penalties, with Richard Ulyatt of the Yorkshire Post and Leeds Intelligencer writing in 1952 that "if penalties had been given every time he had been tackled just outside the penalty area and had fallen just inside it, opponents would be inclined to let him alone". Nightingale told the Yorkshire Evening Post in 1994 that he was "always known for diving" and that "I got a few penalties in my time, and to be right some of them should not have been".
