= Alf Newbold =

English footballer

Personal information
- Date of birth: 7 August 1921
- Place of birth: Hartlepool, England
- Date of death: January 2002
- Position: Defender

Senior career*
Years	Team	Apps	(Gls)
1946–1947	Huddersfield Town	2	(0)
1947	Newport County	22	(0)
- Worcester City
- * Club domestic league appearances and goals

Alfred Newbold (7 August 1921 – January 2002) is a former professional footballer, who played for Huddersfield Town, Newport County and Worcester City.
