= Arthur Morton (footballer) =

English footballer

Personal information
- Place of birth: Thurcroft, England
- Position: Defender

Senior career*
| Years | Team | Apps | (Gls) |
| 1945–1946 | Huddersfield Town | 0 | (0) |
- * Club domestic league appearances and goals

Arthur Morton (22 August 1925 – 1 March 2011) was a professional footballer, who played in 2 FA Cup matches for Huddersfield Town.
