= Bob Danskin =

English footballer (1908–1985)

Personal information
- Full name: Robert Danskin
- Date of birth: 28 May 1908
- Place of birth: Scotswood, England
- Date of death: 14 September 1985 (aged 77)
- Place of death: Shelf, England
- Height: 5 ft 8 in (1.73 m)
- Position: Defender

Senior career*
Years	Team	Apps	(Gls)
- Wallsend
1930–1932	Leeds United	5	(1)
1932–1948	Bradford (Park Avenue)	260	(6)
- * Club domestic league appearances and goals

Bob Danskin (28 May 1908 – 14 September 1985) was an English professional footballer who played as a defender for Leeds United and Bradford Park Avenue.
