= John Tanner (footballer) =

English footballer and cricketer (1921–1987)

Personal information
- Full name: John Denys Parkin Tanner
- Date of birth: 2 July 1921
- Place of birth: Harrogate, England
- Date of death: 25 October 1987
- Place of death: Ben Rhydding, West Yorkshire, England
- Position: Striker

Senior career*
Years	Team	Apps	(Gls)
1948–1949	Huddersfield Town	1	(1)
- * Club domestic league appearances and goals

John Denys Parkin Tanner (2 July 1921 – 25 October 1987) was a professional footballer, who played for Huddersfield Town. He signed for the club in April 1946 from Yorkshire Amateur, turning professional in 1948. He played just one game - and scoring one goal - for the club at the start of the 1948–49 season before returning to Yorkshire Amateur in September 1948.

He was born in Harrogate and died at Ben Rhydding.

Tanner was also a cricketer who played first-class cricket for Oxford University from 1947 to 1949 in a few matches each season as a lower-order right-handed batsman and wicketkeeper, as well as for the Marylebone Cricket Club in 1955. He also played Minor Counties Championship cricket for Oxfordshire in 1951.
