= Brendan McManus =

Northern Ireland footballer

Personal information
- Full name: Brendan McManus
- Date of birth: 2 December 1923
- Place of birth: Kilkeel, Northern Ireland
- Date of death: September 2010 (aged 86)
- Place of death: Oldham, Greater Manchester, England
- Position: Goalkeeper

Senior career*
Years	Team	Apps	(Gls)
- Newry City
1946–1947	Huddersfield Town	1	(0)
1947–1948	Oldham Athletic	35	(0)
1948–1953	Bradford City	125	(0)
- Frickley Colliery
- Scarborough
- * Club domestic league appearances and goals

Brendan McManus (2 December 1923 – September 2010) was a former professional footballer, who played for Newry Town, Huddersfield Town, Oldham Athletic and Bradford City. He was born in Kilkeel, Northern Ireland. He was a goalkeeper who played 161 Football League matches before playing non-league football with Frickley Colliery and Scarborough.
