= Ray Taylor (English footballer) =

English footballer

Raymond Taylor
Personal information
- Full name: Raymond Jeffrey Taylor
- Date of birth: 1 March 1930
- Place of birth: Jump, Barnsley, England
- Date of death: 6 August 2012 (aged 82)
- Place of death: Barnsley, England
- Position: Midfielder

Senior career*
Years	Team	Apps	(Gls)
1946	Wath Wanderers		
1949–1950	Huddersfield Town	2	(0)
1953–1955	Southport	51	(7)
- Denaby United
- * Club domestic league appearances and goals

Raymond Jeffrey Taylor (1 March 1930 – 6 August 2012) was an English professional footballer who played for Wath Wanderers, Huddersfield Town, Southport and Denaby United.
