= Harry Yates (footballer, born 1925) =

English footballer (1925–1987)

Personal information
- Full name: Harry Yates
- Date of birth: 26 September 1925
- Place of birth: Huddersfield, England
- Date of death: 26 November 1987 (aged 62)
- Place of death: Liverpool, England
- Position: Inside forward

Senior career*
| Years | Team | Apps | (Gls) |
| 1949–1950 | Huddersfield Town | 1 | (0) |
| 1950–1952 | Darlington | 91 | (29) |
| 1952–1955 | Headington United | 80 | (42) |
- Bedford Town
- Nuneaton Borough
- * Club domestic league appearances and goals

Harry Yates (26 September 1925 – 26 November 1987) was a professional footballer who played as an inside forward for Huddersfield Town, Darlington, Headington United, Bedford Town and Nuneaton Borough.

He was born in Huddersfield in 1925 and died in Liverpool in 1987 at the age of 62.
