= Joe Poole =

English footballer

Personal information
- Full name: Joseph Poole
- Date of birth: 25 May 1923
- Place of birth: Huddersfield, England
- Date of death: 1990
- Position: Striker

Senior career*
Years	Team	Apps	(Gls)
1946–1947	Huddersfield Town	2	(0)
1947–1949	Bradford City	56	(5)
- * Club domestic league appearances and goals

Joseph Poole (born 25 May 1923) is a former professional footballer, who played for Huddersfield Town and Bradford City. He was born in Huddersfield.
