= George Hutchinson (English footballer) =

English footballer

Personal information
- Full name: George Henry Hutchinson
- Date of birth: 31 October 1929
- Place of birth: Allerton Bywater, England
- Date of death: 1996 (aged 66–67)
- Place of death: Sheffield, England
- Position: Midfielder

Senior career*
Years	Team	Apps	(Gls)
1947–1948	Huddersfield Town	1	(0)
1948–1953	Sheffield United	73	(10)
1953–1954	Tottenham Hotspur	5	(1)
1954–1955	Guildford City	34	(7)
1955–1956	Leeds United	11	(5)
1956–1958	Halifax Town	44	(11)
- Skegness Town
- * Club domestic league appearances and goals

George Henry Hutchinson (31 October 1929 – 1996) was an English professional footballer who played for Huddersfield Town, Sheffield United, Tottenham Hotspur, Guildford City, Leeds United, Halifax Town and Skegness Town. He served in the RAF during national service and was stationed at Ballykelly in Northern Ireland and RAF Cosford and was a PTI. He also played for the RAF team. Hutchinson was born in Allerton Bywater, West Riding of Yorkshire, the son of a miner who worked at the local colliery.
