= Henry Stewart (footballer, born 1925) =

English footballer

Personal information
- Date of birth: 28 April 1925
- Place of birth: Wigan, England
- Date of death: April 1996 (aged 70)
- Place of death: Doncaster, South Yorkshire, England
- Position: Defender

Senior career*
Years	Team	Apps	(Gls)
?–1946	Thorne Colliery		
1946–?	Goole Town		
?–1948	Thorne Colliery		
1948–1951	Huddersfield Town	49	(0)
1951–?	Frickley Colliery		
- * Club domestic league appearances and goals

Harry Stewart (25 April 1925 - April 1996) was a professional footballer, who played for Huddersfield Town in the Football League as a left full-back. He was born in Wigan in 1925.

== Career ==
Prior to becoming a professional footballer, Stewart served in the army, who he represented at football. He played for Thorne Colliery switching to Goole Town before moving back to Thorne Colliery, where he was signed by Huddersfield Town. He was part of the infamous 'Great Escape' Huddersfield team that narrowly avoided relegation from the First Division and despite being a regular he left the club in 1951 to return to non-league football at Frickley Colliery.

== After football ==
Following his unexpected departure from Huddersfield Town, Stewart returned to the Thorne area of Doncaster where he later worked in the colliery and also worked at Bullcroft Colliery, then Richard Dunston's Shipyard in Thorne before retiring. He continued to be involved with football in the Thorne area, as a player and later as a referee.
