= Albert Watson (footballer, born 1918) =

English footballer

Personal information
- Date of birth: 1 June 1918
- Place of birth: Bolton on Dearne, England
- Date of death: 22 October 2009 (aged 91)
- Place of death: Sunderland, England
- Position: Wing half

Senior career*
Years	Team	Apps	(Gls)
1937–1948	Huddersfield Town	18	(0)
1948–1950	Oldham Athletic	42	(0)
- * Club domestic league appearances and goals

Albert Watson (1 June 1918 – 22 October 2009) was a professional footballer, who played for Huddersfield Town and Oldham Athletic. He was born in Bolton on Dearne, near Barnsley, Yorkshire. For many years he had a sports shop in Sunderland trading as Willie Watson Sports, and he died in Sunderland in 2009.
