= Les Smith (footballer, born 1920) =

English footballer

Personal information
- Full name: Leslie Smith
- Date of birth: 2 October 1920
- Place of birth: Manchester, England
- Date of death: 2001 (aged 80–81)
- Place of death: England
- Position: Wing-half

Youth career
- Stockport County

Senior career*
Years	Team	Apps	(Gls)
1946–1949	Huddersfield Town	37	(0)
1949–1956	Oldham Athletic	178	(3)
- * Club domestic league appearances and goals

Leslie Smith (2 October 1920 – 2001) was a professional footballer, who played for Huddersfield Town and Oldham Athletic.

Smith began his career as an amateur at Stockport County, but left the club without making an appearance for the club. In March 1946, he joined Huddersfield Town, where he spent three years before moving to Oldham Athletic where he spent seven seasons, playing close to 200 first-team games.

He died in 2001.
