= Eddie Carr =

English footballer and manager

Personal information
- Full name: Edward Miller Carr
- Date of birth: 3 October 1917
- Place of birth: Wheatley Hill, England
- Date of death: 1998 (aged 80–81)
- Position: Striker

Senior career*
Years	Team	Apps	(Gls)
1935–1939	Arsenal	12	(7)
1935–1937	→ Margate (loan)		
1946	Huddersfield Town	2	(0)
1946–1950	Newport County	98	(48)
1950–1953	Bradford City	94	(49)
1953–1954	Darlington	7	(0)

Managerial career
- 1960–1964: Darlington
- * Club domestic league appearances and goals

Edward Miller Carr (3 October 1917 – 1998) was an English professional footballer and manager.

== Career ==
Born in Wheatley Hill, Carr started his career at Arsenal, joining in 1935 but he spent the first two years of his career there on loan at their nursery club, Margate. He returned to Arsenal in August 1937 and made his debut against Manchester City on 16 February 1938; he went on to score seven times in eleven games to help Arsenal win the 1937–38 title. However, he suffered a serious knee injury in a game at the start of the following season which seemingly finished his career.

During the Second World War he returned to his hometown to work at the local pit but upon the end of hostilities, he returned to playing football with Huddersfield Town. He later played for Newport County, Bradford City and Darlington, whom he later also managed.

== Honours ==
=== As a player ===
Margate

- Southern League Central Section Title winner: 1935–36
- Southern League Eastern Section Title winner: 1935–36
- Southern League Midweek Section Title winner: 1936–37
- Kent Senior Cup winner: 1935–36, 1936–37

Arsenal

- First Division: 1937-38

== Managerial statistics ==
Team	Nat	From	To	Record				
Team	Nat	From	To	G	W	L	D	Win %
Darlington	(England)	June 1960	June 1964	199	73	81	45	36.7
