= George Skelton (footballer) =

English footballer

Personal information
- Full name: George Alfred Skelton
- Date of birth: 27 November 1919
- Place of birth: Thurcroft, England
- Date of death: 1994 (aged 74–75)
- Position: Inside forward

Senior career*
Years	Team	Apps	(Gls)
1945–1946	Huddersfield Town	1	(0)
1946–1947	Leyton Orient	0	(0)
1948–?	Goole Town	0	(0)
- * Club domestic league appearances and goals

George Alfred Skelton (27 November 1919 in Thurcroft, near Rotherham, Yorkshire – 1994) was a professional footballer who played as an inside forward for Huddersfield Town and Leyton Orient.

Skelton played for various army teams during the Second World War, after which he was signed by Huddersfield. He mostly featured as a reserve team player and was transfer-listed at the end of the season. Leyton Orient signed him on a two-month trial during the early part of the following season, after which he was released. He joined Goole Town in May 1948.
