= Donald Hunter (footballer, born 1927) =

English footballer

Personal information
- Full name: Donald Hunter
- Date of birth: 10 March 1927
- Place of birth: Thorne, Doncaster, England
- Date of death: 26 March 2008 (aged 81)
- Position: Defender

Senior career*
| Years | Team | Apps | (Gls) |
| 1948–1951 | Huddersfield Town | 26 | (1) |
| 1951–1952 | Halifax Town | 11 | (0) |
| 1952–1957 | Southport | 174 | (1) |
- * Club domestic league appearances and goals

Donald Hunter (10 March 1927 – 26 March 2008) was a professional footballer, who played for Huddersfield Town, Halifax Town & Southport. He was born in Thorne, Doncaster. Then went on to open butchers and sausage factory Hampton road Southport.
