= Harold Hassall =

English footballer

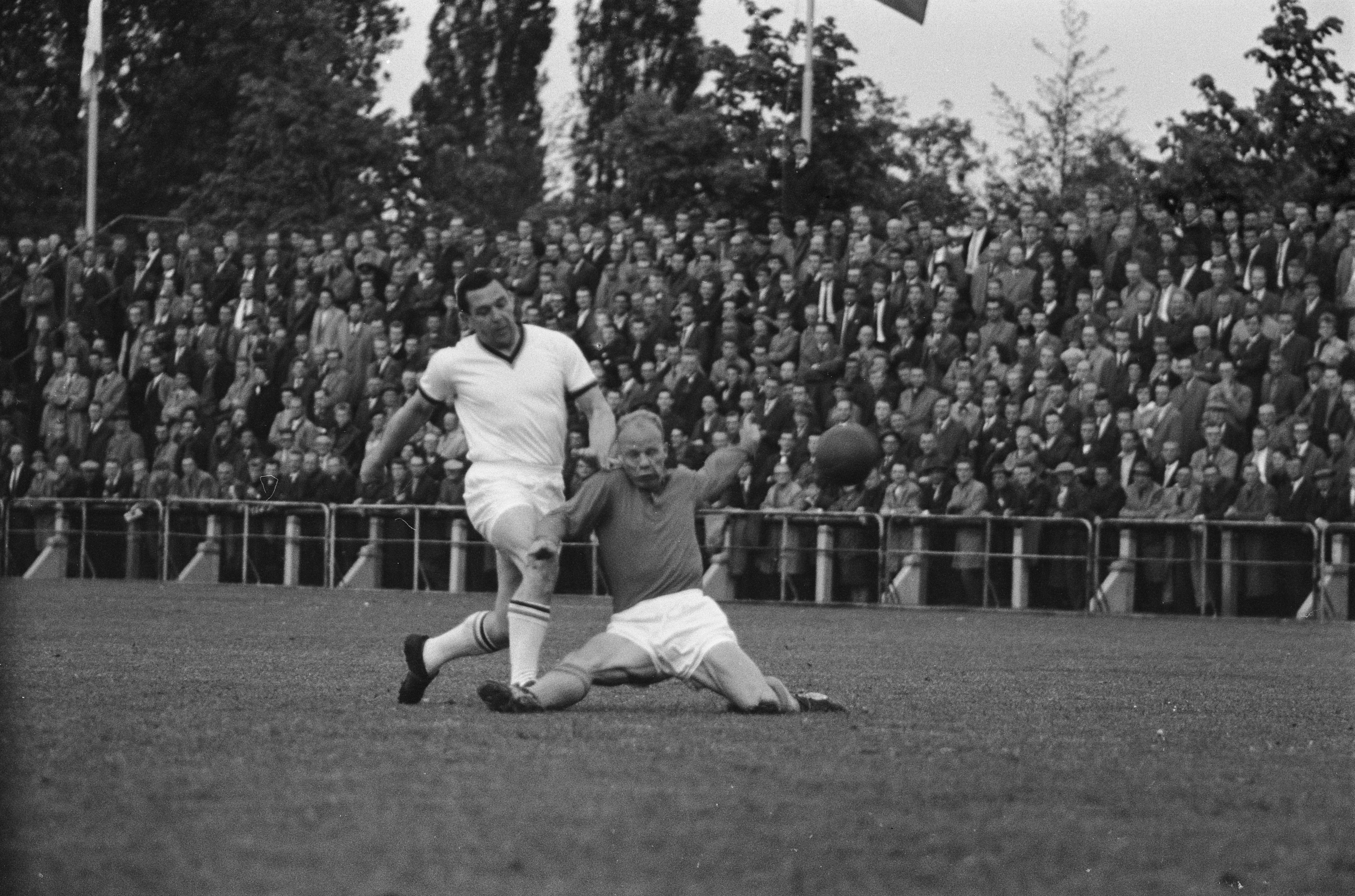
- Hassall (1963)

Personal information
- Full name: Harold William Hassall
- Date of birth: 4 March 1929
- Place of birth: Bolton, England
- Date of death: 30 January 2015 (aged 85)
- Place of death: Bolton, England
- Position: Forward

Senior career*
Years	Team	Apps	(Gls)
1948–1952	Huddersfield Town	74	(26)
1952–1955	Bolton Wanderers	102	(34)
Total		176	(60)

International career
1951–1953	England	5	(4)

Managerial career
- 1969–1970: Malaysia
- * Club domestic league appearances and goals

Harold William Hassall (4 March 1929 – 30 January 2015) was a professional footballer, who played as a forward for Huddersfield Town and Bolton Wanderers in the 1940s and 1950s. Although primarily a forward, Hassall also once played in goal for Huddersfield on 10 November 1951 after regular goalie, Wheeler was injured. The match against defending champions, Tottenham Hotspur was tied at 1-1 and Hassall was praised for keeping a clean sheet that helped earn his team a point.

Harold was one of four Hassall brothers. He lived relatively near to where he was born. He also played 5 matches for England, in which he scored 4 goals.

He coached Malaysia national football team from 1969 to 1970.

Harold's career was ended earlier than expected due to a serious knee injury picked up during his Bolton days on New Year's Day 1955.

He died in Bolton on 30 January 2015.

== Honours ==
Bolton Wanderers

- FA Cup runner-up: 1952–53
