= Tommy Lodge =

English cricketer

Joe Lodge
Personal information
- Full name: Joseph Thomas Lodge
- Date of birth: 16 April 1921
- Place of birth: Skelmanthorpe, England
- Date of death: July 2012
- Position: Defender

Senior career*
| Years | Team | Apps | (Gls) |
| 1946–1948 | Huddersfield Town | 2 | (0) |
| 1950–1951 | St Johnstone | 4 | (0) |
- * Club domestic league appearances and goals

Joe Thomas "Tommy" Lodge (6 April 1921 – July 2012) was an English first-class cricketer, who played two matches for Yorkshire County Cricket Club in 1948. He also played football in the post-war period.

== Cricket career ==
Lodge also played for the Yorkshire Second XI in 1947 and 1948. He took part in three century opening partnerships with Jakeman, Halliday and J.C. Rigg. He also performed well in the Huddersfield and Bradford Leagues and was renowned as a cricket coach. He acted as a professional with Perthshire C.C. for at least ten seasons, scoring over 1,000 runs in each season up to 1961. He also coached at Strathallen School, Scotland.

He made his first-class cricket debut against Kent at Bradford Park Avenue in June, opening the batting and scoring 30 and 5 as Yorkshire won by six wickets. His last match came in July against Northamptonshire, where Lodge scored 13 runs batting at number three, as Yorkshire won by an innings and 196 runs. A right-arm medium pacer, he bowled eight overs for 17 runs without success.

== Football career ==
Lodge played as a defender for Huddersfield Town & St Johnstone.
