= Ted Magner =

Professional Association football manager

Personal information
- Full name: Edward Magner
- Date of birth: 1 January 1891
- Place of birth: Newcastle upon Tyne, England
- Date of death: 16 July 1948 (aged 57)
- Place of death: Derby, England
- Position: Forward

Senior career*
| Years | Team | Apps | (Gls) |
| 1909–1910 | Gainsborough Trinity | | |
| 1910–1912 | Everton | | |
| 1912–1914 | St Mirren | | |
| 1914 | South Liverpool | | |
| 1919–1920 | Shelbourne | | |
| 1920–1921 | Monk's Hall | | |

Managerial career
- 1921–1923: Heracles Almelo
- 1935–1937: Olympique Lillois
- 1937–1938: Metz
- 1939: Denmark
- 1942–1943: Huddersfield Town
- 1944–1946: Derby County
- 1946–1947: Metz
- * Club domestic league appearances and goals

Edward Magner (1 January 1891 in Newcastle upon Tyne – 16 July 1948) was a professional Association football manager. He managed Denmark before moving on to Huddersfield Town, where he managed during the Second World War, and Derby County, where he won a double of the Football League North and Midlands Cup in the 1944–45 season.

Magner was asked to coach the Denmark national football team for the 50th anniversary tournament of the Danish Football Association in 1939. He was seen as possessing a great natural authority, and he introduced a focus on physical conditioning unknown to the then strictly amateur-only Danish football. Magner managed Denmark for the two games at the tournament, as Denmark won against both Finland and Norway.

== Bibliography ==
- Ian Thomas, Owen Thomas, Alan Hodgson, John Ward (2007). 99 Years and Counting: Stats and Stories. Huddersfield Town A.F.C. ISBN 978-0955728105.
- Magner, Ted: Remembering the forgotten manager (biography)
