= John Simpson (footballer, born 1918) =

English footballer and manager

Personal information
- Full name: John Simpson
- Date of birth: 27 October 1918
- Place of birth: Hedon, England
- Date of death: 21 June 2000 (aged 81)
- Place of death: Market Weighton, England
- Position: Full back

Senior career*
Years	Team	Apps	(Gls)
	Bridlington Trinity	?	(?)
1946–1947	Huddersfield Town	5	(0)
1947–1953	York City	207	(0)
	Grantham	?	(?)

Managerial career
- 1970–1971: Hartlepool
- * Club domestic league appearances and goals

John Simpson (27 October 1918 – 21 June 2000) was an English-born footballer who played as a left back in The Football League in the 1940s and 1950s.

After playing as an amateur for Hull City reserves, he started his league career with Huddersfield Town and then moved to York City, first playing for them in 1947–48. He went on to play over 200 games for the Minstermen. He retired through injury in 1954.

During the war, John was in the Army Physical Training Corps and guested for Plymouth Argyle, Bournemouth & Boscombe Athletic, Portsmouth, Southampton, Leyton Orient, Aldershot and Leeds United.

After a spell out of the game, he spent 9 years coaching at Hull City before moving to Hartlepool United as coach. In April 1970 he was appointed manager of Football League Fourth Division side Hartlepool, and he remained as manager until March 1971.

In 1971, he joined Cambridge United and helped them to 2 promotion successes.

In summer 1977, he was appointed physiotherapist at York City. He retired in May 1983 after a testimonial game against Leeds United.
