= Alan Stewart (footballer) =

English footballer

Personal information
- Full name: Alan Victor Stewart
- Date of birth: 24 July 1922
- Place of birth: Newcastle upon Tyne, England
- Date of death: 13 July 2004 (aged 81)
- Place of death: York, England
- Position: Central defender

Senior career*
Years	Team	Apps	(Gls)
1946–1948	Huddersfield Town	14	(0)
1949–1956	York City	208	(1)
- * Club domestic league appearances and goals

Alan Victor Stewart (24 July 1922 – 24 July 2004) was an English professional footballer.

Stewart began his career with Huddersfield Town in 1946. He joined York City in 1949, where he was a part of the team which played in the FA Cup semi-final in 1955. He retired in 1957.
