= Jack Percival (footballer, born 1924) =

English footballer

Personal information
- Full name: Ronald Frederick John Percival
- Date of birth: 19 April 1924
- Place of birth: Ealing, Greater London, England
- Date of death: 6 October 2011 (aged 87)
- Position: Defender

Senior career*
Years	Team	Apps	(Gls)
- Tunbridge Wells
1947–1950	Huddersfield Town	8	(0)
1950–1951	Chesterfield	6	(0)
- Cambridge United
- * Club domestic league appearances and goals

Ronald Frederick John "Jack" Percival (19 April 1924 – 6 October 2011) was a professional footballer, who played for Huddersfield Town, Chesterfield and Cambridge United. He was born in Norwood Green, Ealing, Greater London, and started his career in 1947 playing for Tunbridge Wells in the Kent Amateur League before signing for Huddersfield in February 1948.
