= Don Clegg =

English footballer (1921–2005)

Personal information
- Full name: Donald Clegg
- Date of birth: 2 June 1921
- Place of birth: Huddersfield, England
- Date of death: 2005 (aged 84)
- Position: Goalkeeper

Senior career*
Years	Team	Apps	(Gls)
1946–1948	Huddersfield Town	3	(0)
1949–1950	Bury	15	(0)
1950–1951	Stoke City	2	(0)
1951–19xx	Yeovil Town		
- * Club domestic league appearances and goals

Donald Clegg (2 June 1921 – 2005) was an English footballer who played in the Football League for Bury, Huddersfield Town and Stoke City.

== Career ==
Clegg was born in Huddersfield and played for his local side Huddersfield Town where he made three appearances before leaving for Bury in 1949. He spent two seasons at Gigg Lane making 15 appearances and the joined Stoke City in 1950. He played in just two matches for Stoke failing to make much of an impression, conceding five goals and was released soon after. He went on to play for non-league Yeovil Town.

== Career statistics ==
Appearances and goals by club, season and competition
Club	Season	League			FA Cup		Total	
Club	Season	Division	Apps	Goals	Apps	Goals	Apps	Goals
Huddersfield Town	1945–46	War League	0	0	2	0	2	0
Huddersfield Town	1946–47	First Division	1	0	0	0	1	0
Huddersfield Town	1947–48	First Division	2	0	0	0	2	0
Bury	1948–49	Second Division	2	0	0	0	2	0
Bury	1949–50	Second Division	13	0	0	0	13	0
Stoke City	1950–51	First Division	2	0	0	0	2	0
Career total			20	0	2	0	22	0
