= Conway Smith =

English footballer

Personal information
- Full name: William Conway Smith
- Date of birth: 13 July 1926
- Place of birth: Huddersfield, England
- Date of death: 1989 (aged 62–63)
- Position: Inside forward

Senior career*
Years	Team	Apps	(Gls)
1945–1951	Huddersfield Town	37	(5)
1951–1956	Queens Park Rangers	174	(81)
1956–1962	Halifax Town	183	(73)
–	Nelson		
- * Club domestic league appearances and goals

William Conway Smith (13 July 1926 – 1989) was an English footballer born in Huddersfield, Yorkshire, who played as an inside forward for Huddersfield Town, Queens Park Rangers and Halifax Town in the Football League, and in non-league football for Nelson.

Smith, the son of Huddersfield Town and England footballer Billy Smith, signed for Huddersfield on professional forms in 1945, and made his debut in the 1947–48 season. His progress was interrupted by a broken leg sustained in January 1949, and in March 1951, after "a lengthy spell" on the transfer list, he joined Queens Park Rangers. He played 174 league games for QPR, scoring 81 goals, before transferring to Halifax Town in 1956, where he achieved a similar record.
