= Jeff Barker (footballer) =

English footballer and manager

Personal information
- Full name: Jeffrey Barker
- Date of birth: 16 October 1915
- Place of birth: Scunthorpe, England
- Date of death: March 1985 (aged 69)
- Place of death: Scunthorpe, England
- Position: Defender

Youth career
- Goole Town

Senior career*
| Years | Team | Apps | (Gls) |
| 1935–1936 | Scunthorpe and Lindsey United | ? | (?) |
| 1936–1945 | Aston Villa | 3 | (0) |
| 1945–1948 | Huddersfield Town | 67 | (0) |
| 1948–1952 | Scunthorpe United | 73 | (1) |

Managerial career
- 1974: Scunthorpe United (caretaker)
- * Club domestic league appearances and goals

Jeffrey Barker (16 October 1915 – March 1985) was a professional footballer.

He started his career at Goole Town, before joining Scunthorpe and Lindsey United in 1935. After a year in the Midland League, his exceptional skills got him signed up by Aston Villa for a fee of £400 in November 1936.

He remained at Villa for ten years but only managed three league appearances, before his career was interrupted by World War II. In September 1939, he played in the Villa Reserves last pre-war game at home to Derby County. On 4th September the Government announced a ban on Sport to prevent crowds gathering. Villa's League match away to Wolves was one of over thirty mid-week League fixtures called-off. Villa Park found itself in an evacuation district designated under the British Government's civilian evacuation scheme. The Police Chief Constable of Birmingham, C.C.H Moriarty, intimated that he would not sanction football matches within the city of Birmingham. The Football League's Scheme for War-time football proposed to limit gates to 8,000 in evacuation areas. With their large overheads, the directors of Aston Villa and Sunderland announced their intention to close down. The manager and players were paid off whilst Villa Park was commandeered by the War Office. Villa's players quickly found war-time employment. Barker became a constable in Birmingham City Police.

Barker continued to play for Villa in the wartime leagues, making six appearances and also guested for Blackpool, Rochdale, Walsall, Watford and Huddersfield Town. In August 1942, he made a single guest appearance for Dundee United in Scotland.

After the war, he joined Huddersfield Town in November 1945, where he made 67 appearances before returning to Scunthorpe United in August 1948.

In 1974, he was in charge of "the Iron" for three games while a new manager was being approached.

He died in 1985 in Scunthorpe.

His son John also played for Scunthorpe United.
