= Frank Reid (footballer) =

Scottish footballer (1920–1970)

Personal information
- Full name: Francis Reid
- Date of birth: June 16, 1920
- Place of birth: Mauchline, Scotland
- Date of death: 2 February 1970 (aged 49)
- Place of death: Huddersfield, England
- Position: Striker

Youth career
- Cumnock Juniors

Senior career*
Years	Team	Apps	(Gls)
1946–1949	Huddersfield Town	7	(0)
1949–1951	Stockport County	23	(0)
- Mossley
- * Club domestic league appearances and goals

Francis Reid (16 June 1920 – 2 February 1970) was a Scottish professional footballer who played as a striker for Cumnock Juniors, Huddersfield Town, Stockport County and Mossley.
