= Graham Bailey (footballer) =

English footballer (1920–2024)

Personal information
- Full name: Thomas Graham Bailey
- Date of birth: 22 March 1920
- Place of birth: Dawley, Shropshire, England
- Date of death: 15 November 2024 (aged 104)
- Place of death: Falmouth, Cornwall
- Position: Full-back

Senior career*
Years	Team	Apps	(Gls)
1936–1947	Huddersfield Town	33	(0)
1947–1950	Sheffield United	20	(0)
Total		53	(0)
- * Club domestic league appearances and goals

Thomas Graham Bailey (22 March 1920 – 15 November 2024) was an English professional footballer who played as a full-back for Huddersfield Town and for Sheffield United.

== Early life ==
Thomas Graham Bailey was born in Dawley, Shropshire on 22 March 1920.

== Career ==
When he signed for the 1949–50 season at Sheffield United in May 1949 a fee of £12 per week was agreed for the first part of the season.

In 1989, Bailey was invited back to Sheffield United to celebrate the club's centenary at a reunion of past and present players at Bramall Lane.

== Personal life and death ==
After retiring from play he became a newsagent in business in Huddersfield and later in Falmouth, settling in Bridlington in 1997. Bailey celebrated his 100th birthday in March 2020, and in February 2021 was tracked down by the Huddersfield Town Supporters Association and confirmed to be the club's oldest living former player. He was visited by the Club Ambassador Andy Booth on his 101st birthday and presented with a Town shirt with his name on the back. As of April 2023, Bailey was living in East Yorkshire with his wife. He died on 15 November 2024, at his son's home in Falmouth, at the age of 104. At the time of his death he was the last surviving professional footballer to have played in the 1930's.
