= Alf Whittingham =

English footballer (1914–1993)

Personal information
- Full name: Alfred Whittingham
- Date of birth: 19 June 1914
- Place of birth: Altofts, England
- Date of death: 1993 (aged 78–79)
- Position: Striker

Senior career*
Years	Team	Apps	(Gls)
1936–1946	Bradford City	87	(24)
1946–1949	Huddersfield Town	67	(17)
1949–1950	Halifax Town	39	(9)
- * Club domestic league appearances and goals

Alfred Whittingham (19 June 1914 – 1993) was a professional footballer, who played for Bradford City, Huddersfield Town and Halifax Town. He was born in Altofts, West Yorkshire.

During World War II, Whittingham made 78 guest appearances for Southampton, scoring 84 goals; on 16 January 1943 he scored eight goals in an 11–0 victory over Luton Town.
