= Arnold Rodgers =

English footballer

Personal information
- Full name: Arnold William Rodgers
- Date of birth: 5 December 1923
- Place of birth: Rotherham, England
- Date of death: October 1993
- Place of death: Bristol, England
- Position: Striker

Senior career*
Years	Team	Apps	(Gls)
1946–1950	Huddersfield Town	28	(17)
1950–1956	Bristol City	195	(106)
1956	Shrewsbury Town	13	(3)
- * Club domestic league appearances and goals

Arnold William Rodgers (5 December 1923 – October 1993) was an English professional footballer who made over 230 Football League appearances in the years after the Second World War in a career for Huddersfield Town, Bristol City and Shrewsbury Town.

Rodgers had initially played for Huddersfield as a guest in 1942, before he signed on full-time in 1946. After Shrewsbury Town he moved to Somerset where he was manager for non-league clubs Welton Rovers, which he helped to two losing first round appearances in the FA Cup (in 1964-65 and 1967–68), and Bath City from 1967 to 1971.

Following retirement from football he ran a business in Bristol as a florist for 37 years until he died of a heart attack in October 1993, aged 69.
