= Tom Briggs (footballer) =

English footballer

Personal information
- Full name: Thomas Raymond Briggs
- Date of birth: 11 May 1919
- Place of birth: Rotherham, England
- Date of death: 7 November 1999 (aged 80)
- Place of death: Crewe, England
- Position: Full back

Senior career*
Years	Team	Apps	(Gls)
1946–1949	Huddersfield Town	45	(0)
1949–1956	Crewe Alexandra	202	(2)
- * Club domestic league appearances and goals

Thomas Raymond Briggs (11 May 1919 in Rotherham, England – 1999) was an English footballer, who played as a defender for Huddersfield Town and Crewe Alexandra.
