= Arthur Thompson (English footballer) =

English footballer

Personal information
- Full name: Arthur Thompson
- Date of birth: 15 June 1922
- Place of birth: Dewsbury, England
- Date of death: July 1996 (aged 74)
- Position: Striker

Senior career*
Years	Team	Apps	(Gls)
1946–1949	Huddersfield Town	25	(5)
- * Club domestic league appearances and goals

Arthur Thompson (15 June 1922 – July 1996) is a former professional footballer, who played for Huddersfield Town. He was born in Dewsbury.
