= George Hepplewhite (footballer) =

English footballer

Personal information
- Full name: George Hepplewhite
- Date of birth: 5 September 1919
- Place of birth: Edmondsley, County Durham, England
- Date of death: 1989 (aged 69–70)
- Place of death: Washington, Tyne and Wear, England
- Position: Defender

Senior career*
| Years | Team | Apps | (Gls) |
| 1946–1951 | Huddersfield Town | 156 | (3) |
| 1951–1953 | Preston North End | 0 | (0) |
| 1953–1954 | Bradford City | 57 | (2) |
- * Club domestic league appearances and goals

George Hepplewhite (5 September 1919 – 1989) was a professional footballer, who played for Huddersfield Town, Preston North End and Bradford City. He was born in Edmondsley, County Durham.
