= Albert Bateman =

English footballer (1924–2020)

Personal information
- Date of birth: 13 June 1924
- Place of birth: Stocksbridge, Sheffield, England
- Date of death: 21 April 2020 (aged 95)
- Position: Midfielder

Senior career*
| Years | Team | Apps | (Gls) |
| 1946–1949 | Huddersfield Town | 73 | (14) |
- * Club domestic league appearances and goals

Albert Bateman (13 June 1924 – 23 April 2020) was an English professional footballer, who played for Huddersfield Town. He was born in Stocksbridge, Sheffield, Yorkshire. At the time of his death, Bateman was the oldest living former Huddersfield Town player. 5 great-grandchildren
