= George Howe (footballer) =

English footballer (1924–1971)

Personal information
- Full name: George Howe
- Date of birth: 10 January 1924
- Place of birth: Wakefield, England
- Date of death: 10 November 1971 (aged 47)
- Place of death: Wakefield, England
- Height: 5 ft 8 in (1.73 m)
- Position: Defender

Senior career*
Years	Team	Apps	(Gls)
?–1942	Carlton United	?	(?)
1942–1954	Huddersfield Town	40	(0)
1954–1961	York City	307	(0)
Total		347	(0)
- * Club domestic league appearances and goals

George Howe (10 January 1924 – 10 November 1971) was an English footballer who played as a defender.

== Career ==
Born in Wakefield, West Yorkshire, Howe joined Huddersfield Town from non-League side Carlton United in May 1942. He joined York City in June 1954, where he was a part of the team which played in the FA Cup semi-final in 1955. He retired from playing after spending the 1961–62 in the reserve team. He died suddenly at the age of 47 on 10 November 1971.
