= Philip Wood =

British Army brigadier

Brigadier-General Philip Wood CB CMG
- Born: February 1868
- Died: 10 October 1945 (aged 77)
- Military career
- Allegiance: United Kingdom
- Branch: British Army
- Service years: 1887−1919
- Rank: Brigadier-General
- Unit: Royal Irish Fusiliers
- Commands: 2nd Battalion, Royal Irish Fusiliers; 43rd Infantry Brigade; 33rd Division
- Conflicts: First World War
- Awards: Companion of the Order of the Bath; Companion of the Order of St Michael and St George

Brigadier-General Philip Richard Wood (February 1868 – 10 October 1945) was a senior British Army officer who briefly served as General Officer Commanding 33rd Division during the First World War.

== Military career ==
Wood was commissioned into the Royal Irish Fusiliers in February 1887.

He saw action in the Nile Expedition in 1899 before becoming commanding officer of the 2nd Battalion, Royal Irish Fusiliers on the Western Front in December 1914 during the First World War. After receiving a promotion to the temporary rank of brigadier general in August 1915, he went on to be commander of the 43rd Infantry Brigade. In June 1916 he was made a brevet lieutenant colonel and after being made a substantive colonel in March 1917, was general officer commanding (GOC) of the 33rd Division, Kitchener's Army, in September 1917, but was replaced in November. He was promoted again to temporary brigadier general in April 1918 and succeeded George Glas Sandeman Carey in command of the 46th (North Midland) Division's 139th (Sherwood Foresters) Brigade.

He was appointed a Companion of the Order of St Michael and St George on 23 June 1915 and a Companion of the Order of the Bath in the 1917 Birthday Honours.

In May 1919, with the war now over, he reverted to his permanent rank of colonel.

He retired from the army on 18 December 1919 and was granted the honorary rank of brigadier general.
