= Billy Price (footballer, born 1917) =

English footballer

Personal information
- Full name: Albert James William Price
- Date of birth: 4 October 1917
- Place of birth: Wrockwardine, England
- Date of death: 1995 (aged 77–78)
- Position: Centre forward

Senior career*
Years	Team	Apps	(Gls)
- Wrockwardine Wood
1937–1947	Huddersfield Town	51	(23)
1947–1948	Reading	15	(2)
1948–1949	Hull City	8	(5)
1949–1952	Bradford City	54	(28)
- Winsford United
- * Club domestic league appearances and goals

Albert James William Price (4 October 1917 – 1995) was a professional footballer. He played as centre forward.

Born in Wrockwardine, Shropshire, Billy Price's career started at local side Wrockwardine Wood, before he signed for Huddersfield Town. His Town career was interrupted by the Second World War but by the time he left for Reading two years after the war he had scored 23 goals from 51 games. After a short stay at Reading he had a shorter spell at Hull City, although he did manage five goals in just eight games.

Instead he moved to Bradford City in October 1949, scoring a penalty in his second game, and finishing his first season as top goal-scorer with 12 league goals and four FA Cup goals including a hat-trick in a 9–0 rout of Fleetwood. Another 15 goals saw him finish as top goal-scorer again in 1950–51 before he left the following season after making just eight starts. His career took him to non-league Winsford United.
