= 1971–72 Manchester United F.C. season =

English football club season

Manchester United
1971–72 season
- Chairman: Louis Edwards
- Manager: Frank O'Farrell
- First Division: 8th
- FA Cup: Sixth Round
- League Cup: Fourth Round
- Top goalscorer: League: George Best (18); All: George Best (26)
- Highest home attendance: 56,362 vs Manchester City (12 April 1972)
- Lowest home attendance: 23,146 vs West Bromwich Albion (23 August 1971)
- Average home league attendance: 47,177
Home colours	Away colours	Third colours

The 1971–72 season was Manchester United's 70th season in the Football League, and their 27th consecutive season in the top division of English football. In a pre-season competition United participated in the Watney Cup, which was contested by the teams that had scored the most goals in each of the four divisions of the Football League the previous season who had not been promoted or admitted to one of the European competitions.

Before the beginning of the season, on 8 June 1971, Frank O'Farrell was appointed as United manager, more than five months after Wilf McGuinness had been sacked. Sir Matt Busby had returned to the role of manager until the end of the season before returning to his role of director.

Due to Manchester United being banned from playing their first two home matches in Old Trafford, after hooligans had thrown knives into the away section at a match at the end of the previous season, their opening "home" games were played at Anfield and the Victoria Ground.

O'Farrell's first season as United managed started well, and they were top of the league by Christmas. However, a run of seven successive league defeats after the turn of 1972 dragged them down the table. In January and February 1972, United conceded 16 goals, including 5 at Elland Road. O'Farrell attempted to shore up the leaky defence with the signing of Martin Buchan from Aberdeen for a (then) club record fee of £125,000. United never recovered their early season form and they could only manage an eighth-place finish.

== Watney Cup ==
Date	Round	Opponents	H / A	Result F–A	Scorers	Attendance
31 July 1971	Round 1	Halifax Town	A	1–2	Best	19,765

== First Division ==
Date	Opponents	H / A	Result F–A	Scorers	Attendance
14 August 1971	Derby County	A	2–2	Gowling, Law	35,386
18 August 1971	Chelsea	A	3–2	Charlton, Kidd, Morgan	54,663
20 August 1971	Arsenal	H	3–1	Charlton, Gowling, Kidd	27,649
23 August 1971	West Bromwich Albion	H	3–1	Best (2), Gowling	23,146
28 August 1971	Wolverhampton Wanderers	A	1–1	Best	46,479
31 August 1971	Everton	A	0–1		52,151
4 September 1971	Ipswich Town	H	1–0	Best	45,656
11 September 1971	Crystal Palace	A	3–1	Law (2), Kidd	43,720
18 September 1971	West Ham United	H	4–2	Best (3), Charlton	53,339
25 September 1971	Liverpool	A	2–2	Charlton, Law	55,642
2 October 1971	Sheffield United	H	2–0	Best, Gowling	51,758
9 October 1971	Huddersfield Town	A	3–0	Best, Charlton, Law	33,458
16 October 1971	Derby County	H	1–0	Best	53,247
23 October 1971	Newcastle United	A	1–0	Best	55,603
30 October 1971	Leeds United	H	0–1		53,884
6 November 1971	Manchester City	A	3–3	Gowling, Kidd, McIlroy	63,326
13 November 1971	Tottenham Hotspur	H	3–1	Law (2), McIlroy	54,058
20 November 1971	Leicester City	H	3–2	Law (2), Kidd	48,764
27 November 1971	Southampton	A	5–2	Best (3), Kidd, McIlroy	30,323
4 December 1971	Nottingham Forest	H	3–2	Kidd (2), Law	45,411
11 December 1971	Stoke City	A	1–1	Law	33,875
18 December 1971	Ipswich Town	A	0–0		29,213
27 December 1971	Coventry City	H	2–2	James, Law	52,035
1 January 1972	West Ham United	A	0–3		41,990
8 January 1972	Wolverhampton Wanderers	H	1–3	McIlroy	47,626
22 January 1972	Chelsea	H	0–1		55,927
29 January 1972	West Bromwich Albion	A	1–2	Kidd	46,992
12 February 1972	Newcastle United	H	0–2		44,983
19 February 1972	Leeds United	A	1–5	Burns	45,399
4 March 1972	Tottenham Hotspur	A	0–2		54,814
8 March 1972	Everton	H	0–0		38,415
11 March 1972	Huddersfield Town	H	2–0	Best, Storey-Moore	53,581
25 March 1972	Crystal Palace	H	4–0	Charlton, Gowling, Law, Storey-Moore	41,550
1 April 1972	Coventry City	A	3–2	Best, Charlton, Storey-Moore	37,870
3 April 1972	Liverpool	H	0–3		54,000
4 April 1972	Sheffield United	A	1–1	Sadler	45,045
8 April 1972	Leicester City	A	0–2		35,649
12 April 1972	Manchester City	H	1–3	Buchan	56,362
15 April 1972	Southampton	H	3–2	Best, Kidd, Storey-Moore	38,437
22 April 1972	Nottingham Forest	A	0–0		35,063
25 April 1972	Arsenal	A	0–3		49,125
29 April 1972	Stoke City	H	3–0	Best, Charlton, Storey-Moore	34,959

Pos	Team	Pld	W	D	L	GF	GA	GAv	Pts	Qualification or relegation
6	Tottenham Hotspur	42	19	13	10	63	42	1.500	51	Qualification for the UEFA Cup first round (Note: Tottenham Hotspur qualified for the UEFA Cup as the 1971-72 UEFA Cup winners.)
7	Chelsea	42	18	12	12	58	49	1.184	48	
8	Manchester United	42	19	10	13	69	61	1.131	48	Declined place in Watney Cup
9	Wolverhampton Wanderers	42	18	11	13	65	57	1.140	47	Qualification for the Watney Cup (Note: Wolverhampton Wanderers and Sheffield United qualified for the Watney Cup as the two teams with the most goals that hadn't already qualified for a European competition. (Manchester United would have qualified, but declined their place in the competition.))
10	Sheffield United	42	17	12	13	61	60	1.017	46	Qualification for the Watney Cup

Source: World Football
Rules for classification: 1) Points; 2) Goal average; 3) Goals scored

== FA Cup ==
Date	Round	Opponents	H / A	Result F–A	Scorers	Attendance
15 January 1972	Round 3	Southampton	A	1–1	Charlton	30,190
19 January 1972	Round 3 Replay	Southampton	H	4–1	Best (2), Sadler, Aston	50,966
5 February 1972	Round 4	Preston North End	A	2–0	Gowling (2)	27,025
26 February 1972	Round 5	Middlesbrough	H	0–0		53,850
29 February 1972	Round 5 Replay	Middlesbrough	A	3–0	Morgan, Best, Charlton	39,683
18 March 1972	Round 6	Stoke City	H	1–1	Best	54,226
22 March 1972	Round 6 Replay	Stoke City	A	1–2	Best	49,192

== League Cup ==
Date	Round	Opponents	H / A	Result F–A	Scorers	Attendance
7 September 1971	Round 2	Ipswich Town	A	3–1	Morgan, Best (2)	28,143
6 October 1971	Round 3	Burnley	H	1–1	Charlton	44,600
18 October 1971	Round 3 Replay	Burnley	A	1–0	Charlton	27,511
27 October 1971	Round 4	Stoke City	H	1–1	Gowling	47,062
8 November 1971	Round 4 Replay	Stoke City	A	0–0		40,805
15 November 1971	Round 4 Second Replay	Stoke City	A	1–2	Best	42,249

== Squad statistics ==
Pos.	Name	League		FA Cup		League Cup		Total	
Pos.	Name	Apps	Goals	Apps	Goals	Apps	Goals	Apps	Goals
GK	(England) John Connaughton	3	0	0	0	0	0	3	0
GK	(England) Alex Stepney	39	0	7	0	6	0	52	0
DF	(Scotland) Martin Buchan	13	1	2	0	0	0	15	1
DF	(Scotland) Francis Burns	15(2)	1	5	0	3	0	23(2)	1
DF	(Republic of Ireland) Tony Dunne	34	0	4	0	3	0	41	0
DF	(England) Paul Edwards	4	0	2	0	0	0	6	0
DF	(England) Steve James	37	1	5	0	6	0	48	1
DF	(England) Tommy O'Neil	37	0	7	0	6	0	50	0
DF	(England) David Sadler	37	1	6	1	6	0	49	2
DF	(England) Tony Young	5(2)	0	0	0	0	0	5(2)	0
MF	(England) John Aston, Jr.	2(7)	0	0(1)	1	2(2)	0	4(10)	1
MF	(Northern Ireland) George Best	40	18	7	5	6	3	53	26
MF	(England) Bobby Charlton	40	8	7	2	6	2	53	12
MF	(Scotland) John Fitzpatrick	1	0	0	0	0	0	1	0
MF	(Northern Ireland) Sammy McIlroy	8(8)	4	1(2)	0	2	0	11(10)	4
MF	(Scotland) Willie Morgan	35	1	7	1	6	1	48	3
MF	(Italy) Carlo Sartori	0(2)	0	0	0	1	0	1(2)	0
FW	(England) Alan Gowling	35(2)	6	6(1)	2	6	1	47(3)	9
FW	(England) Brian Kidd	34	10	4	0	5	0	43	10
FW	(Scotland) Denis Law	32(1)	13	7	0	2	0	41(1)	13
FW	(England) Ian Storey-Moore	11	5	0	0	0	0	11	5
–	Own goals	–	0	–	0	–	0	–	0
