= 1970–71 Manchester United F.C. season =

English football club season

Manchester United F.C.
1970–71 season
- Chairman: Louis Edwards
- Manager: Wilf McGuinness (until 29 December 1970); Matt Busby (from 29 December 1970)
- First Division: 8th
- FA Cup: Third round
- League Cup: Semi-finals
- Top goalscorer: League: George Best (18); All: George Best (21)
- Highest home attendance: 59,523 vs Leeds United (15 August 1970)
- Lowest home attendance: 32,068 vs Portsmouth (7 October 1970)
- Average home league attendance: 45,028
Home colours	Away colours	Third colours

The 1970–71 season was Manchester United's 69th season in the Football League, and their 26th consecutive season in the top division of English football. In a pre-season competition United participated in the Watney Cup, which was contested by the teams that had scored the most goals in each of the four divisions of the Football League the previous season who had not been promoted or admitted to one of the European competitions.

On 29 December 1970, United manager Wilf McGuinness who struggled in his new post was replaced with Matt Busby who returned as United manager until the end of the season, guiding the club to an eighth-place finish in the league. Following speculation that the Celtic manager Jock Stein would take over during the close season of 1971, Leicester City manager Frank O'Farrell was given the United job.

United's best chance of success came in the League Cup, but they were beaten by Third Division side Aston Villa in the semi-finals.

== Watney Cup ==
Date	Round	Opponents	H / A	Result F–A	Scorers	Attendance
1 August 1970	Round 1	Reading	A	3–2	Charlton (2), P. Edwards	18,348
5 August 1970	Semi-final	Hull City	A	1–1 (a.e.t., 4–3 p.)	Law	34,007
8 August 1970	Final	Derby County	A	1–4	Best	32,049

== First Division ==
Date	Opponents	H / A	Result F–A	Scorers	Attendance
15 August 1970	Leeds United	H	0–1		59,523
19 August 1970	Chelsea	H	0–0		51,079
22 August 1970	Arsenal	A	0–4		54,137
25 August 1970	Burnley	A	2–0	Law (2)	29,442
29 August 1970	West Ham United	H	1–1	Fitzpatrick	50,959
2 September 1970	Everton	H	2–0	Best, Charlton	51,220
5 September 1970	Liverpool	A	1–1	Kidd	52,542
12 September 1970	Coventry City	H	2–0	Best, Charlton	48,912
19 September 1970	Ipswich Town	A	0–4		27,776
26 September 1970	Blackpool	H	1–1	Best	46,647
3 October 1970	Wolverhampton Wanderers	A	2–3	Gowling, Kidd	38,629
10 October 1970	Crystal Palace	H	0–1		42,969
17 October 1970	Leeds United	A	2–2	Charlton, Fitzpatrick	50,169
24 October 1970	West Bromwich Albion	H	2–1	Kidd, Law	43,278
31 October 1970	Newcastle United	A	0–1		45,195
7 November 1970	Stoke City	H	2–2	Law, Sadler	47,553
14 November 1970	Nottingham Forest	A	2–1	Gowling, Sartori	36,384
21 November 1970	Southampton	A	0–1		30,202
28 November 1970	Huddersfield Town	H	1–1	Best	45,306
5 December 1970	Tottenham Hotspur	A	2–2	Best, Law	55,693
12 December 1970	Manchester City	H	1–4	Kidd	52,686
19 December 1970	Arsenal	H	1–3	Sartori	33,182
26 December 1970	Derby County	A	4–4	Law (2), Best, Kidd	34,068
9 January 1971	Chelsea	A	2–1	Gowling, Morgan	53,482
16 January 1971	Burnley	H	1–1	Aston	40,135
30 January 1971	Huddersfield Town	A	2–1	Aston, Law	41,464
6 February 1971	Tottenham Hotspur	H	2–1	Best, Morgan	48,965
20 February 1971	Southampton	H	5–1	Gowling (4), Morgan	36,060
23 February 1971	Everton	A	0–1		52,544
27 February 1971	Newcastle United	H	1–0	Kidd	41,902
6 March 1971	West Bromwich Albion	A	3–4	Aston, Best, Kidd	41,112
13 March 1971	Nottingham Forest	H	2–0	Best, Law	40,473
20 March 1971	Stoke City	A	2–1	Best (2)	40,005
3 April 1971	West Ham United	A	1–2	Best	38,507
10 April 1971	Derby County	H	1–2	Law	45,691
12 April 1971	Wolverhampton Wanderers	H	1–0	Gowling	41,766
13 April 1971	Coventry City	A	1–2	Best	33,849
17 April 1971	Crystal Palace	A	5–3	Law (3), Best (2)	39,146
19 April 1971	Liverpool	H	0–2		44,004
24 April 1971	Ipswich Town	H	3–2	Charlton, Best, Kidd	33,566
1 May 1971	Blackpool	A	1–1	Law	29,857
5 May 1971	Manchester City	A	4–3	Best (2), Charlton, Law	43,626

Pos	Team	Pld	W	D	L	GF	GA	GAv	Pts	Qualification or relegation
6	Chelsea	42	18	15	9	52	42	1.238	51	Qualification for the European Cup Winners' Cup first round (Note: Chelsea qualified for the European Cup Winners' Cup as the 1970-71 European Cup Winners' Cup winners.)
7	Southampton	42	17	12	13	56	44	1.273	46	Qualification for the UEFA Cup first round
8	Manchester United	42	16	11	15	65	66	0.985	43	Qualification for the Watney Cup (Note: Manchester United and West Bromwich Albion qualified for the Watney Cup as the two teams with the most goals that hadn't already qualified for a European competition.)
9	Derby County	42	16	10	16	56	54	1.037	42	
10	Coventry City	42	16	10	16	37	38	0.974	42	

Source: World Football
Rules for classification: 1) Points; 2) Goal average; 3) Goals scored

== FA Cup ==
Date	Round	Opponents	H / A	Result F–A	Scorers	Attendance
2 January 1971	Round 3	Middlesbrough	H	0–0		47,924
5 January 1971	Round 3 Replay	Middlesbrough	A	1–2	Best	41,000

== League Cup ==
Date	Round	Opponents	H / A	Result F–A	Scorers	Attendance
9 September 1970	Round 2	Aldershot	A	3–1	Best, Kidd, Law	18,509
7 October 1970	Round 3	Portsmouth	H	1–0	Charlton	32,068
28 October 1970	Round 4	Chelsea	H	2–1	Charlton, Best	47,565
18 November 1970	Round 5	Crystal Palace	H	4–2	Fitzpatrick, Kidd (2), Charlton	48,961
16 December 1970	Semi-final; First leg	Aston Villa	H	1–1	Kidd	48,889
23 December 1970	Semi-final; Second leg	Aston Villa	A	1–2	Kidd	63,000

== Squad statistics ==
Pos.	Name	League		FA Cup		League Cup		Total	
Pos.	Name	Apps	Goals	Apps	Goals	Apps	Goals	Apps	Goals
GK	(England) Jimmy Rimmer	20	0	2	0	6	0	28	0
GK	(England) Alex Stepney	22	0	0	0	0	0	22	0
DF	(Scotland) Francis Burns	16(4)	0	0	0	1(1)	0	17(5)	0
DF	(Scotland) Ian Donald	0	0	0	0	1	0	1	0
DF	(Republic of Ireland) Tony Dunne	35	0	2	0	5	0	42	0
DF	(England) Paul Edwards	29(1)	0	1	0	2	0	32(1)	0
DF	(England) Steve James	13	0	0	0	3(1)	0	16(1)	0
DF	(England) Tommy O'Neil	1	0	0	0	0	0	1	0
DF	(England) David Sadler	32	1	2	0	5	0	39	1
DF	(Scotland) Ian Ure	13	0	1	0	3	0	17	0
DF	(Scotland) Willie Watson	8	0	0	0	2	0	10	0
DF	(England) Tony Young	0(1)	0	0	0	0	0	0(1)	0
MF	(England) John Aston, Jr.	19(1)	3	0	0	3(1)	0	22(2)	3
MF	(Northern Ireland) George Best	40	18	2	1	6	2	48	21
MF	(England) Bobby Charlton	42	5	2	0	6	3	50	8
MF	(Scotland) Paddy Crerand	24	0	2	0	1	0	27	0
MF	(Scotland) John Fitzpatrick	35	2	2	0	6	1	43	3
MF	(Scotland) Willie Morgan	25	3	2	0	2	0	29	3
MF	(Italy) Carlo Sartori	2(5)	2	0	0	1	0	3(5)	2
MF	(England) Nobby Stiles	17	0	0	0	2	0	19	0
FW	(England) Alan Gowling	17(3)	8	0(1)	0	1	0	18(4)	8
FW	(England) Brian Kidd	24(1)	8	2	0	6	5	32(1)	13
FW	(Scotland) Denis Law	28	15	2	0	4	1	34	16
–	Own goals	–	0	–	0	–	0	–	0
