= 1972–73 Manchester United F.C. season =

English football club season

Manchester United
1972–73 season
- Chairman: Louis Edwards
- Manager: Frank O'Farrell (until 19 December 1972); Tommy Docherty (from 22 December 1972)
- First Division: 18th
- FA Cup: Third Round
- League Cup: Third Round
- Anglo-Italian Cup: Group stage (2nd)
- Top goalscorer: League: Bobby Charlton (6); All: Bobby Charlton (7)
- Highest home attendance: 61,676 vs Manchester City (21 April 1973)
- Lowest home attendance: 21,486 vs Oxford United (12 September 1972)
- Average home league attendance: 46,703
Home colours	Away colours	Third colours

The 1972–73 season was Manchester United's 71st season in the Football League, and their 28th consecutive season in the top division of English football. For the first and only season United took part in the Anglo-Italian Cup, the 1973 version.

In September 1972, Frank O'Farrell signed Welsh international centre-forward Wyn Davies from Manchester City for a fee of £60,000. The signing paid immediate dividends with Davies scoring on his United debut in a 3-0 win against Derby County. Shortly afterwards, O'Farrell paid Bournemouth, then in the Third Division, a reported £194,445 for the services of striker, Ted MacDougall. Despite these signings, United's results were poor and on 19 December 1972, Frank O'Farrell was sacked as United manager following a 5–0 defeat at Crystal Palace that had left them in real danger of relegation, with little improvement having been made on United's dismal nine-match winless start to the league campaign. On the same day, the club's directors also announced that the errant George Best would not be playing for them again.

Three days later Tommy Docherty was appointed as the new manager, after he resigned from the Scotland national team, and he guided United to survival. Docherty's guided United to 18th place in the final table, after they managed seven league victories following his appointment.

United struggled to find goals in the league, only managing 44 from 42 games, with Bobby Charlton – in his final season as a player before retiring – topping the club's goalscoring charts with a mere six goals in the First Division. Denis Law, who had rarely played this season, was given a free transfer at the end of the campaign after 11 years with the club.

== First Division ==
Date	Opponents	H / A	Result F–A	Scorers	Attendance
12 August 1972	Ipswich Town	H	1–2	Law	51,459
15 August 1972	Liverpool	A	0–2		54,779
19 August 1972	Everton	A	0–2		52,348
23 August 1972	Leicester City	H	1–1	Best	40,067
26 August 1972	Arsenal	H	0–0		48,108
30 August 1972	Chelsea	H	0–0		44,482
2 September 1972	West Ham United	A	2–2	Best, Storey-Moore	32,372
9 September 1972	Coventry City	H	0–1		37,073
16 September 1972	Wolverhampton Wanderers	A	0–2		34,049
23 September 1972	Derby County	H	3–0	Davies, Morgan, Storey-Moore	48,255
30 September 1972	Sheffield United	A	0–1		37,347
7 October 1972	West Bromwich Albion	A	2–2	Best, Storey-Moore	39,209
14 October 1972	Birmingham City	H	1–0	MacDougall	52,104
21 October 1972	Newcastle United	A	1–2	Charlton	38,170
28 October 1972	Tottenham Hotspur	H	1–4	Charlton	52,497
4 November 1972	Leicester City	A	2–2	Best, Davies	32,575
11 November 1972	Liverpool	H	2–0	Davies, MacDougall	53,944
18 November 1972	Manchester City	A	0–3		52,086
25 November 1972	Southampton	H	2–1	Davies, MacDougall	36,073
2 December 1972	Norwich City	A	2–0	MacDougall, Storey-Moore	35,913
9 December 1972	Stoke City	H	0–2		41,347
16 December 1972	Crystal Palace	A	0–5		39,484
23 December 1972	Leeds United	H	1–1	MacDougall	46,382
26 December 1972	Derby County	A	1–3	Storey-Moore	35,098
6 January 1973	Arsenal	A	1–3	Kidd	51,194
20 January 1973	West Ham United	H	2–2	Charlton, Macari	50,878
24 January 1973	Everton	H	0–0		58,970
27 January 1973	Coventry City	A	1–1	Holton	42,767
10 February 1973	Wolverhampton Wanderers	H	2–1	Charlton (2)	52,089
17 February 1973	Ipswich Town	A	1–4	Macari	31,918
3 March 1973	West Bromwich Albion	H	2–1	Kidd, Macari	46,735
10 March 1973	Birmingham City	A	1–3	Macari	51,278
17 March 1973	Newcastle United	H	2–1	Holton, Martin	48,426
24 March 1973	Tottenham Hotspur	A	1–1	Graham	49,751
31 March 1973	Southampton	A	2–0	Charlton, Holton	23,161
7 April 1973	Norwich City	H	1–0	Martin	48,593
11 April 1973	Crystal Palace	H	2–0	Kidd, Morgan	46,891
14 April 1973	Stoke City	A	2–2	Macari, Morgan	37,051
18 April 1973	Leeds United	A	1–0	Anderson	45,450
21 April 1973	Manchester City	H	0–0		61,676
23 April 1973	Sheffield United	H	1–2	Kidd	57,280
28 April 1973	Chelsea	A	0–1		44,184

Pos	Team	Pld	W	D	L	GF	GA	GAv	Pts
16	Leicester City	42	10	17	15	40	46	0.870	37
17	Everton	42	13	11	18	41	49	0.837	37
18	Manchester United	42	12	13	17	44	60	0.733	37
19	Coventry City	42	13	9	20	40	55	0.727	35
20	Norwich City	42	11	10	21	36	63	0.571	32

Source: World Football
Rules for classification: 1) Points; 2) Goal average; 3) Goals scored

== FA Cup ==
Date	Round	Opponents	H / A	Result F–A	Scorers	Attendance
13 January 1973	Round 3	Wolverhampton Wanderers	A	0–1		40,005

== League Cup ==
Date	Round	Opponents	H / A	Result F–A	Scorers	Attendance
6 September 1972	Round 2	Oxford United	A	2–2	Law, Charlton	16,560
12 September 1972	Round 2 Replay	Oxford United	H	3–1	Best (2), Storey-Moore	21,486
3 October 1972	Round 3	Bristol Rovers	A	1–1	Morgan	33,597
11 October 1972	Round 3 Replay	Bristol Rovers	H	1–2	McIlroy	29,348

== Anglo-Italian Cup ==
Date	Opponents	H / A	Result F–A	Scorers	Attendance
21 February 1973	Fiorentina	H	1–1	Holton	23,951
21 March 1973	Lazio	A	0–0		52,834
4 April 1973	Bari	H	3–1	Law, Storey-Moore, Martin	14,303
2 May 1973	Verona	A	4–1	Charlton (2), Olney, Fletcher	8,168

English Group 1

Club	Pld	W	D	L	GF	GA	Pts
Crystal Palace	4	3	1	0	10	4	7
Manchester United	4	2	2	0	8	3	6
Luton Town	4	2	1	1	8	4	5
Hull City	4	2	1	1	4	3	5

Italian Group 1

Club	Pld	W	D	L	GF	GA	Pts
Fiorentina	4	1	2	1	4	4	4
Lazio	4	0	2	2	4	7	2
Verona	4	1	0	3	5	11	2
Bari	4	0	1	3	1	8	1

== Squad statistics ==
Pos.	Name	League		FA Cup		League Cup		Total	
Pos.	Name	Apps	Goals	Apps	Goals	Apps	Goals	Apps	Goals
GK	(England) Alex Stepney	38	0	1	0	4	0	43	0
GK	(England) Jimmy Rimmer	4	0	0	0	0	0	4	0
DF	(Scotland) Martin Buchan	42	0	1	0	4	0	47	0
DF	(Scotland) Ian Donald	4	0	0	0	1	0	5	0
DF	(Republic of Ireland) Tony Dunne	24	0	0(1)	0	3	0	27(1)	0
DF	(England) Paul Edwards	1	0	0	0	0	0	1	0
DF	(Scotland) Alex Forsyth	8	0	1	0	0	0	9	0
DF	(Scotland) Jim Holton	15	3	0	0	0	0	15	3
DF	(England) Steve James	22	0	0	0	4	0	26	0
DF	(England) Tommy O'Neil	16	0	0	0	1	0	17	0
DF	(England) David Sadler	19	0	1	0	2	0	22	0
DF	(England) Arnie Sidebottom	2	0	0	0	0	0	2	0
DF	(Scotland) Willie Watson	3	0	0	0	1	0	4	0
DF	(England) Tony Young	28(2)	0	1	0	3	0	32(2)	0
MF	(Northern Ireland) George Best	19	4	0	0	4	2	23	6
MF	(England) Bobby Charlton	34(2)	6	1	0	4	1	39(2)	7
MF	(Scotland) John Fitzpatrick	5	0	0	0	1	0	6	0
MF	(Scotland) George Graham	18	1	1	0	0	0	19	1
MF	(Republic of Ireland) Mick Martin	14(2)	2	0	0	0	0	14(2)	2
MF	(Northern Ireland) Sammy McIlroy	4(6)	0	0	0	0(3)	1	4(9)	1
FW	(Northern Ireland) Trevor Anderson	2(5)	1	0	0	0	0	2(5)	1
FW	(Wales) Wyn Davies	15(1)	4	1	0	0	0	16(1)	4
FW	(England) Peter Fletcher	0(2)	0	0	0	0	0	0(2)	0
FW	(England) Brian Kidd	17(5)	4	1	0	2	0	20(5)	4
FW	(Scotland) Denis Law	9(2)	1	1	0	2	1	12(2)	2
FW	(Scotland) Lou Macari	16	5	0	0	0	0	16	5
FW	(Scotland) Ted MacDougall	18	5	0	0	0	0	18	5
FW	(Scotland) Willie Morgan	39	4	1	0	4	0	44	4
FW	(England) Ian Storey-Moore	26	5	0	0	4	1	30	6
–	Own goals	–	0	–	0	–	0	–	0

Anglo-Italian Cup matches are not included in statistics
