= 1967–68 Manchester United F.C. season =

English football club season

Manchester United F.C.
1967–68 season
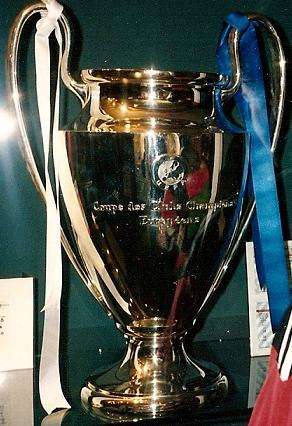
- The European Cup trophy won by Manchester United displayed in the Manchester United museum, 1992.
- Chairman: Louis Edwards
- Manager: Matt Busby
- First Division: 2nd
- FA Cup: Third round
- European Cup: Winners
- Charity Shield: Shared
- Top goalscorer: League: George Best (28); All: George Best (32)
- Highest home attendance: 63,500 vs Tottenham Hotspur (27 January 1968); 63,500 vs Real Madrid (24 April 1968)
- Lowest home attendance: 43,912 vs Hibernians (20 September 1967)
- Average home league attendance: 57,790
Home colours	Away colours	Third colours

The 1967–68 season was one of the most successful seasons in Manchester United's history, as the team beat Benfica 4–1 in the final of the 1967–68 European Cup to become the first English team to win the competition. The team was led by manager Matt Busby. Despite the European Cup success, United finished second in the First Division, two points behind local rival Manchester City after losing the last game of the season against Sunderland.

The 1967–68 season was a breakout year for winger George Best, who led the team with 28 goals in the First Division and 32 goals overall, being voted European Footballer of the Year and FWA Footballer of the Year. Four other players scored double-digit goals during the campaign: Bobby Charlton (20), Brian Kidd (17), Denis Law (11), and young winger John Aston, Jr. (10).

== FA Charity Shield ==
On 12 August 1967, United and Tottenham Hotspur kicked off the season, playing for the 1967 FA Charity Shield at Old Trafford. Bobby Charlton scored two goals for United, while Denis Law scored their third. The match finished at 3–3, which meant that the two clubs shared the Shield, each holding it for six months.

Date	Opponents	H / A	Result F–A	Scorers	Attendance
12 August 1967	Tottenham Hotspur	H	3–3	Charlton (2), Law	54,106

== Football League First Division ==
Date	Opponents	H / A	Result F–A	Scorers	Attendance	League position
19 August 1967	Everton	A	1–3	Charlton	61,452	18th
23 August 1967	Leeds United	H	1–0	Charlton	53,016	13th
26 August 1967	Leicester City	H	1–1	Foulkes	51,256	11th
2 September 1967	West Ham United	A	3–1	Kidd, Ryan, Sadler	36,562	9th
6 September 1967	Sunderland	A	1–1	Kidd	51,527	10th
9 September 1967	Burnley	H	2–2	Burns, Crerand	55,809	11th
16 September 1967	Sheffield Wednesday	A	1–1	Best	47,274	9th
23 September 1967	Tottenham Hotspur	H	3–1	Best (2), Law	58,779	7th
30 September 1967	Manchester City	A	2–1	Charlton (2)	62,942	5th
7 October 1967	Arsenal	H	1–0	Aston	60,197	3rd
14 October 1967	Sheffield United	A	3–0	Aston, Kidd, Law	29,170	3rd
25 October 1967	Coventry City	H	4–0	Aston (2), Best, Charlton	54,253	2nd
28 October 1967	Nottingham Forest	A	1–3	Best	49,946	2nd
4 November 1967	Stoke City	H	1–0	Charlton	51,041	2nd
8 November 1967	Leeds United	A	0–1		43,999	2nd
11 November 1967	Liverpool	A	2–0	Best (2)	54,515	1st
18 November 1967	Southampton	H	3–2	Aston, Charlton, Kidd	48,732	1st
25 November 1967	Chelsea	A	1–1	Kidd	54,712	1st
2 December 1967	West Bromwich Albion	H	2–1	Best (2)	52,568	1st
9 December 1967	Newcastle United	A	2–2	Dunne, Kidd	48,639	1st
16 December 1967	Everton	H	3–1	Aston, Law, Sadler	60,736	1st
23 December 1967	Leicester City	A	2–2	Charlton, Law	40,104	1st
26 December 1967	Wolverhampton Wanderers	H	4–0	Best (2), Charlton, Kidd	63,450	1st
30 December 1967	Wolverhampton Wanderers	A	3–2	Aston, Charlton, Kidd	53,940	1st
6 January 1968	West Ham United	H	3–1	Aston, Best, Charlton	54,468	1st
20 January 1968	Sheffield Wednesday	H	4–2	Best (2), Charlton, Kidd	55,254	1st
3 February 1968	Tottenham Hotspur	A	2–1	Best, Charlton	57,790	1st
17 February 1968	Burnley	A	1–2	Best	31,965	1st
24 February 1968	Arsenal	H	2–0	Best, Own goal	46,417	1st
2 March 1968	Chelsea	H	1–3	Kidd	62,978	1st
16 March 1968	Coventry City	A	0–2		47,110	2nd
23 March 1968	Nottingham Forest	H	3–0	Brennan, Burns, Herd	61,978	2nd
27 March 1968	Manchester City	H	1–3	Best	63,004	3rd
30 March 1968	Stoke City	A	4–2	Aston, Best, Gowling, Ryan	30,141	1st
6 April 1968	Liverpool	H	1–2	Best	63,059	2nd
12 April 1968	Fulham	A	4–0	Best (2), Kidd, Law	40,152	1st
13 April 1968	Southampton	A	2–2	Best, Charlton	30,079	1st
15 April 1968	Fulham	H	3–0	Aston, Best, Charlton	60,465	1st
20 April 1968	Sheffield United	H	1–0	Law	55,033	1st
29 April 1968	West Bromwich Albion	A	3–6	Law, Kidd (2)	43,412	1st
4 May 1968	Newcastle United	H	6–0	Best (3), Kidd (2), Sadler	59,976	2nd
11 May 1968	Sunderland	H	1–2	Best	62,963	2nd

Pos	Team	Pld	W	D	L	GF	GA	GAv	Pts	Qualification or relegation
1	Manchester City (C)	42	26	6	10	86	43	2.000	58	Qualification for the European Cup first round (Note: Manchester United qualified for the European Cup as the 1967–68 European Cup winners.)
2	Manchester United	42	24	8	10	89	55	1.618	56	Qualification for the European Cup first round
3	Liverpool	42	22	11	9	71	40	1.775	55	Qualification for the Inter-Cities Fairs Cup first round
4	Leeds United	42	22	9	11	71	41	1.732	53	Qualification for the Inter-Cities Fairs Cup first round
5	Everton	42	23	6	13	67	40	1.675	52	

Source: World Football
Rules for classification: 1) Points; 2) Goal average; 3) Goals scored
(C) Champions

== FA Cup ==
Date	Round	Opponents	H / A	Result F–A	Scorers	Attendance
27 January 1968	Third Round	Tottenham Hotspur	H	2–2	Best, Charlton	63,500
31 January 1968	Third Round; Replay	Tottenham Hotspur	A	0–1		57,200

== European Cup ==
Date	Round	Opponents	H / A	Result F–A	Scorers	Attendance
20 September 1967	First round First leg	Hibernians	H	4–0	Law (2), Sadler (2)	43,912
27 September 1967	First round Second leg	Hibernians	A	0–0		25,000
15 November 1967	Second round First leg	FK Sarajevo	A	0–0		45,000
29 November 1967	Second round Second leg	FK Sarajevo	H	2–1	Aston, Best	62,801
27 February 1968	Quarter-final; First leg	Górnik Zabrze	H	2–0	Florenski (o.g.), Kidd	63,456
13 March 1968	Quarter-final; Second leg	Górnik Zabrze	A	0–1		105,000
24 April 1968	Semi-final; First leg	Real Madrid	H	1–0	Best	63,500
15 May 1968	Semi-final; Second leg	Real Madrid	A	3–3	Foulkes, Sadler, Zoco (o.g.)	125,000
29 May 1968	Final	Benfica	N	4–1 (a.e.t.)	Charlton (2), Best, Kidd	100,000

== Squad statistics ==
Pos.	Name	First Division		FA Cup		European Cup		Other		Total	
Pos.	Name	Apps	Goals	Apps	Goals	Apps	Goals	Apps	Goals	Apps	Goals
GK	(England) Jimmy Rimmer	1	0	0	0	0	0	0	0	1	0
GK	(England) Alex Stepney	41	0	2	0	9	0	1	0	53	0
FB	(Republic of Ireland) Shay Brennan	13	1	0	0	3	0	1	0	17	1
FB	(Scotland) Francis Burns	36	2	2	0	7	0	0	0	49	2
FB	(Republic of Ireland) Tony Dunne	37	1	2	0	9	0	1	0	49	1
FB	(Scotland) Frank Kopel	1(1)	0	0	0	0	0	0	0	1(1)	0
HB	(Scotland) Paddy Crerand	41	1	2	0	9	0	1	0	53	1
HB	(Scotland) John Fitzpatrick	14(3)	0	2	0	2	0	0	0	18(3)	0
HB	(England) Bill Foulkes	24	1	0	0	6	1	1	0	31	2
HB	(England) David Sadler	40(1)	3	2	0	9	3	0	0	51(1)	6
HB	(England) Nobby Stiles	20	0	0	0	7	0	1	0	28	0
FW	(England) John Aston, Jr.	34(3)	11	2	0	6	1	1	0	43(3)	11
FW	(Northern Ireland) George Best	41	28	2	1	9	3	1	0	53	32
FW	(England) Bobby Charlton	41	15	2	1	9	2	1	2	53	20
FW	(England) Alan Gowling	4(1)	1	0	0	0	0	0	0	4(1)	1
FW	(Scotland) David Herd	6	1	1	0	1	0	0	0	8	1
FW	(England) Brian Kidd	38	15	2	0	9	2	1	0	50	17
FW	(Scotland) Denis Law	23	7	1	0	3	2	1	1	28	10
FW	(Scotland) Jimmy Ryan	7(1)	2	0	0	1	0	0	0	8(1)	2
Own goals		–	1	–	0	–	2	–	0	–	3
