= 1966–67 Manchester United F.C. season =

English football club season

Manchester United F.C.
1966–67 season
- Chairman: Louis Edwards
- Manager: Matt Busby
- First Division: 1st
- FA Cup: Fourth round
- League Cup: Second round
- Top goalscorer: League: Denis Law (23); All: Denis Law (25)
- Highest home attendance: 63,500 vs Stoke City (28 January 1967)
- Lowest home attendance: 41,343 vs West Bromwich Albion (20 August 1966)
- Average home league attendance: 54,726
Home colours	Away colours	Third colours

The 1966–67 season was Manchester United's 65th season in the Football League, and their 22nd consecutive season in the top division of English football. They finished the season as league champions for the seventh time in their history and the fifth under the management of Matt Busby, but this would be their last top division title for 26 years.

United's top scorer this season was Denis Law, with 23 in the league and 25 in all competitions.

== First Division ==
Date	Opponents	H / A	Result F–A	Scorers	Attendance
20 August 1966	West Bromwich Albion	H	5–3	Law (2), Best, Herd, Stiles	41,343
23 August 1966	Everton	A	2–1	Law (2)	60,657
27 August 1966	Leeds United	A	1–3	Best	45,092
31 August 1966	Everton	H	3–0	Connelly, Foulkes, Law	61,114
3 September 1966	Newcastle United	H	3–2	Connelly, Herd, Law	44,448
7 September 1966	Stoke City	A	0–3		44,337
10 September 1966	Tottenham Hotspur	A	1–2	Law	56,295
17 September 1966	Manchester City	H	1–0	Law	62,085
24 September 1966	Burnley	H	4–1	Crerand, Herd, Law, Sadler	52,697
1 October 1966	Nottingham Forest	A	1–4	Charlton	41,854
8 October 1966	Blackpool	A	2–1	Law (2)	33,555
15 October 1966	Chelsea	H	1–1	Law	56,789
29 October 1966	Arsenal	H	1–0	Sadler	45,387
5 November 1966	Chelsea	A	3–1	Aston (2), Best	55,958
12 November 1966	Sheffield Wednesday	H	2–0	Charlton, Herd	46,942
19 November 1966	Southampton	A	2–1	Charlton (2)	29,458
26 November 1966	Sunderland	H	5–0	Herd (4), Law	44,687
30 November 1966	Leicester City	A	2–1	Best, Law	39,014
3 December 1966	Aston Villa	A	1–2	Herd	39,937
10 December 1966	Liverpool	H	2–2	Best (2)	61,768
17 December 1966	West Bromwich Albion	A	4–3	Herd (3), Law	32,080
26 December 1966	Sheffield United	A	1–2	Herd	42,752
27 December 1966	Sheffield United	H	2–0	Crerand, Herd	59,392
31 December 1966	Leeds United	H	0–0		53,486
14 January 1967	Tottenham Hotspur	H	1–0	Herd	57,366
21 January 1967	Manchester City	A	1–1	Foulkes	62,983
4 February 1967	Burnley	A	1–1	Sadler	40,165
11 February 1967	Nottingham Forest	H	1–0	Law	62,727
25 February 1967	Blackpool	H	4–0	Charlton (2), Law, own goal	47,158
3 March 1967	Arsenal	A	1–1	Aston	63,363
11 March 1967	Newcastle United	A	0–0		37,430
18 March 1967	Leicester City	H	5–2	Aston, Charlton, Herd, Law, Sadler	50,281
25 March 1967	Liverpool	A	0–0		53,813
27 March 1967	Fulham	A	2–2	Best, Stiles	47,290
28 March 1967	Fulham	H	2–1	Foulkes, Stiles	51,673
1 April 1967	West Ham United	H	3–0	Best, Charlton, Law	61,308
10 April 1967	Sheffield Wednesday	A	2–2	Charlton (2)	51,101
18 April 1967	Southampton	H	3–0	Charlton, Law, Sadler	54,291
22 April 1967	Sunderland	A	0–0		43,570
29 April 1967	Aston Villa	H	3–1	Aston, Best, Law	55,782
6 May 1967	West Ham United	A	6–1	Law (2), Best, Charlton, Crerand, Foulkes	38,424
13 May 1967	Stoke City	H	0–0		61,071

Pos	Team	Pld	W	D	L	GF	GA	GAv	Pts	Qualification or relegation
1	Manchester United (C)	42	24	12	6	84	45	1.867	60	Qualification for the European Cup first round
2	Nottingham Forest	42	23	10	9	64	41	1.561	56	Qualification for the Inter-Cities Fairs Cup first round
3	Tottenham Hotspur	42	24	8	10	71	48	1.479	56	Qualification for the European Cup Winners' Cup first round (Note: Tottenham Hotspur qualified for the European Cup Winners' Cup as the 1966–67 FA Cup winners.)
4	Leeds United	42	22	11	9	62	42	1.476	55	Qualification for the Inter-Cities Fairs Cup first round
5	Liverpool	42	19	13	10	64	47	1.362	51	Qualification for the Inter-Cities Fairs Cup first round

Source: World Football
Rules for classification: 1) Points; 2) Goal average; 3) Goals scored
(C) Champions

== FA Cup ==
Date	Round	Opponents	H / A	Result F–A	Scorers	Attendance
28 January 1967	Round 3	Stoke City	H	2–0	Herd, Law	63,500
18 February 1967	Round 4	Norwich City	H	1–2	Law	63,409

== Football League Cup ==
Date	Round	Opponents	H / A	Result F–A	Scorers	Attendance
14 September 1966	Second round	Blackpool	A	1–5	Herd	15,570

== Squad statistics ==
Pos.	Name	League		FA Cup		League Cup		Total	
Pos.	Name	Apps	Goals	Apps	Goals	Apps	Goals	Apps	Goals
GK	(Republic of Ireland) Pat Dunne	0	0	0	0	1	0	1	0
GK	(England) David Gaskell	5	0	0	0	0	0	5	0
GK	(Northern Ireland) Harry Gregg	2	0	0	0	0	0	2	0
GK	(England) Alex Stepney	35	0	2	0	0	0	37	0
FB	(Republic of Ireland) Shay Brennan	16	0	0	0	1	0	17	0
FB	(Republic of Ireland) Noel Cantwell	4	0	0	0	0	0	4	0
FB	(Republic of Ireland) Tony Dunne	40	0	2	0	1	0	43	0
FB	(England) Bobby Noble	29	0	2	0	0	0	31	0
HB	(Scotland) Paddy Crerand	39	3	2	0	1	0	42	3
HB	(Scotland) John Fitzpatrick	3	0	0	0	0	0	3	0
HB	(England) Bill Foulkes	33	4	1	0	1	0	35	4
HB	(England) Nobby Stiles	37	3	2	0	1	0	40	3
FW	(England) Willie Anderson	0(1)	0	0	0	0	0	0(1)	0
FW	(England) John Aston, Jr.	26(4)	5	0	0	1	0	27(4)	5
FW	(Northern Ireland) George Best	42	10	2	0	1	0	45	10
FW	(England) Bobby Charlton	42	12	2	0	0	0	44	12
FW	(England) John Connelly	6	2	0	0	1	0	7	2
FW	(Scotland) David Herd	28	16	2	1	1	1	31	18
FW	(Scotland) Denis Law	36	23	2	2	0	0	38	25
FW	(Scotland) Jimmy Ryan	4(1)	0	1	0	0	0	5(1)	0
FW	(England) David Sadler	35(1)	5	2	0	1	0	38(1)	5
–	Own goals	–	1	–	0	–	0	–	1
