= John Fitzpatrick (footballer, born 1946) =

Scottish footballer (1946–2020)

Personal information
- Full name: John Herbert Norton Fitzpatrick
- Date of birth: 18 August 1946
- Place of birth: Aberdeen, Scotland
- Date of death: 21 December 2020 (aged 74)
- Height: 5 ft 6 in (1.68 m)
- Positions: Wing half; full-back

Youth career
- ?–1961: Thistle Lads' Club (Aberdeen)
- 1961–1963: Manchester United

Senior career*
| Years | Team | Apps | (Gls) |
| 1963–1973 | Manchester United | 117 | (8) |
- * Club domestic league appearances and goals

John Herbert Norton Fitzpatrick (18 August 1946 – 21 December 2020) was a Scottish footballer who played variously as a wing half, forward and full-back for English club Manchester United. He joined the Manchester United ground staff as a 15-year-old and made his way up through the club's ranks before complications from a knee injury forced him to retire from playing at the age of 26. Following retirement from professional football at an early age, and having moved back to his home City of Aberdeen, John carried on his involvement in professional football in the Scottish Highland Football League where he took up Club management rolls with Buckie Thistle FC, and subsequently with Huntly FC.

== Career ==
Born in Aberdeen, Fitzpatrick started his football career with a local youth club, Thistle Lads' Club, before being spotted by Manchester United scouts in September 1961. He was invited to Old Trafford for trials, but before the move to Manchester, he asked to play one last match for his old club; during the match he broke his leg, which delayed him signing apprentice forms with Manchester United until July 1962. In the meantime, he worked as a member of the club's ground staff. He turned professional in September 1963.

After being part of the team that won the FA Youth Cup in April 1964, which also included John Aston, David Sadler and George Best, Fitzpatrick made his professional debut at the age of 18 in February 1965, filling in for the injured Nobby Stiles at left-half in a 1–0 away defeat to Sunderland. On 16 October 1965, he became Manchester United's first ever substitute in a Football League match, coming on for Denis Law in a 5–1 away defeat against Tottenham Hotspur. He made only sporadic appearances over the next two seasons, exclusively as a wing-half, where his opportunities were limited by the appearances of Stiles and Paddy Crerand. The 1967–68 season saw him make more regular appearances in a variety of positions, including in the forward line, but it was not until February 1969 that he found his ultimate position as a right-sided full-back, filling in for the injured Shay Brennan. His season came to a slightly premature end, when he was sent off in the first leg of the European Cup semi-final against Milan, following which he had to have a police escort to the changing rooms. The incident resulted in Fitzpatrick receiving an eight-week suspension.

Fitzpatrick retained his place in the side at the start of the 1969–70 season, but an injury gained against Tottenham on 22 November 1969 ruled him out for the next four months. He recovered to play in the last seven matches of the season, and after the departure of Brennan to become player–manager at Waterford United, he missed only seven league matches in 1970–71. He made only one appearance in 1971–72, after a recurrence of the knee cartilage problem he had experienced two years earlier, which subsequently required four operations to correct. Although he was able to return for the start of the 1972–73 season, he lasted just six matches in the first team and another two in the reserves before retiring on medical advice, bringing to an end a career in which he made nearly 150 appearances, and scored 10 goals. In recognition of his nine years of service to the club, Manchester United presented Fitzpatrick with a cheque for £20,000, as well as organising a cabaret dinner in his honour, which raised a further £1,000. When John moved back to Aberdeen, he took on Club management roles in the Scottish Highland Football League with Buckie Thistle FC, and subsequently with Huntly FC.

== Statistics ==
Appearances and goals by club, season and competition
| Club | Season | League | | Cup | | League Cup | | Europe | | Other (Note: Includes the FA Community Shield, Intercontinental Cup and Anglo-Italian Cup) | | Total | |
| Club | Season | Apps | Goals | Apps | Goals | Apps | Goals | Apps | Goals | Apps | Goals | Apps | Goals |
|---|---|---|---|---|---|---|---|---|---|---|---|---|---|
| Manchester United | 1964–65 | 2 | 0 | 0 | 0 | — | | 0 | 0 | — | | 2 | 0 |
| Manchester United | 1965–66 | 4 | 0 | 0 | 0 | — | | 1 | 0 | 0 | 0 | 5 | 0 |
| Manchester United | 1966–67 | 3 | 0 | 0 | 0 | 0 | 0 | — | | — | | 3 | 0 |
| Manchester United | 1967–68 | 17 | 0 | 2 | 0 | — | | 2 | 0 | 0 | 0 | 21 | 0 |
| Manchester United | 1968–69 | 30 | 3 | 6 | 1 | — | | 4 | 0 | 0 | 0 | 40 | 4 |
| Manchester United | 1969–70 | 20 | 3 | 1 | 0 | 5 | 0 | — | | — | | 26 | 3 |
| Manchester United | 1970–71 | 35 | 2 | 2 | 0 | 6 | 1 | — | | — | | 43 | 3 |
| Manchester United | 1971–72 | 1 | 0 | 0 | 0 | 0 | 0 | — | | — | | 1 | 0 |
| Manchester United | 1972–73 | 5 | 0 | 0 | 0 | 1 | 0 | 0 | 0 | 0 | 0 | 6 | 0 |
| Total | | 117 | 8 | 11 | 1 | 12 | 1 | 7 | 0 | 0 | 0 | 147 | 10 |

== Honours ==
Manchester United

- European Cup: 1967–68

== Later life ==
After retiring, he returned to his home town of Aberdeen, where he went into business as a wine importer.

He died in December 2020 at the age of 74.
