= Crerand =

Crerand is a surname. Notable people with the surname include:

- Danny Crerand (born 1969), English footballer
- Paddy Crerand (born 1939), Scottish footballer
