= 1968 European Cup final =

Football match at Wembley Stadium, London

- Official event poster
- Event: 1967–68 European Cup
Benfica	Manchester United
(Portugal)	(England)
1	4
- After extra time
- Date: 29 May 1968
- Venue: Wembley Stadium, London
- Man of the Match: John Aston (Manchester United)
- Referee: Concetto Lo Bello (Italy)
- Attendance: 92,225

The 1968 European Cup final was the final match of the 1967–68 European Cup, the premier club football competition in Europe. It was played at Wembley Stadium in London, England, on 29 May 1968 between Benfica of Portugal and Manchester United of England in front of a crowd of 92,225. Both teams had to go through four rounds of two-legged knockout ties to reach the final; it was Benfica's fifth European Cup final, two of which they had won, and Manchester United's first.

Both sides went close in a goalless first half, before Manchester United took the lead from Bobby Charlton's header eight minutes into the second; however, Jaime Graça's 79th-minute equaliser meant the match went into extra time. Manchester United then scored three times in seven minutes in the extra period; the first was a solo goal from George Best, followed by a header from Brian Kidd on his 19th birthday. Charlton scored his second in the 99th minute, as Manchester United triumphed 4–1 to become the first English club to win the European Cup.

== Background ==
The European Cup, now known as the UEFA Champions League, is a club football tournament contested by the best teams across Europe. The competition was first played in 1955–56. Neither Benfica nor Manchester United participated in the inaugural tournament, which was by invitation only; although Benfica had won the 1954–55 Primeira Divisão title, Sporting CP had already been invited. In 1968, only the league champion from each country qualified. Benfica reached the European Cup final for the first time in 1961, when they beat Barcelona 3–2. The following year, Benfica defended their title, coming from behind to beat Real Madrid 5–3 in the final. Benfica were losing finalists twice more over the next three years, losing to AC Milan in 1963 and Inter Milan in 1965.

Manchester United had never previously reached a European Cup final. They had been losing semi-finalists in both the 1956–57 and 1957–58 competitions. In February 1958, the team were returning from Belgrade having eliminated Red Star Belgrade in the quarter-finals when eight of their players were killed and two more suffered career-ending injuries in the Munich air disaster. Despite not qualifying, they were invited by UEFA to play in the following season's European Cup, but were forced to withdraw by the English Football Association. They returned to the competition in 1965–66, when they faced Benfica for the first time in the quarter-finals. Manchester United won 8–3 on aggregate, but were eliminated in the semi-final.

== Route to the final ==
=== Benfica ===
Benfica's route to the final
Round	Opponent	Agg.	1st leg	2nd leg
First round	(Northern Ireland) Glentoran	1–1 (away goals)	1–1 (a)	0–0 (h)
Second round	(France) Saint-Étienne	2–1	2–0 (h)	0–1 (a)
Quarter-final	(Hungary) Vasas	3–0	0–0 (a)	3–0 (h)
Semi-final	(Italy) Juventus	3–0	2–0 (h)	1–0 (a)

Benfica entered the tournament as champions of Portugal, having won the 1966–67 Primeira Divisão. They faced Glentoran of Northern Ireland in the first round, travelling to Belfast for the first leg. Glentoran took the lead from a John Colrain penalty in the 10th minute, before Eusébio equalised in the 86th minute, and it finished 1–1. In the second leg, the two sides played out a goalless draw, which resulted in Benfica qualifying for the second round on the away goals rule. In the next round, they were drawn against Saint-Étienne of France. A goal from José Augusto in the 29th minute and a penalty from Eusébio in the 60th helped Benfica to a 2–0 home victory in the first leg. In France, Saint-Étienne won the second leg 1–0 via a 10th-minute goal from Georges Bereta. Despite losing the match, Benfica progressed 2–1 on aggregate.

In the quarter-finals, Benfica played out a goalless draw with Hungarian side Vasas in their away leg. Returning to Portugal for the second leg, the first half also remained goalless, before two goals from Eusébio and another from José Torres made it 3–0 to Benfica, and secured their place in the semi-final, where they faced Juventus of Italy. Benfica played the first leg at home, and once again strikes from Eusébio and Torres helped them to victory; each scored during the second half to give their team a 2–0 lead in the tie. In the second leg, The Guardian reported that Benfica were "technically superior, although Juventus maintained aggressive play." A Eusébio goal in 66th minute extended Benfica's advantage in the tie to 3–0, and secured them a place in the final.

=== Manchester United ===
Manchester United's route to the final
Round	Opponent	Agg.	1st leg	2nd leg
First round	(Malta) Hibernians	4–0	4–0 (h)	0–0 (a)
Second round	(Socialist Federal Republic of Yugoslavia) Sarajevo	2–1	0–0 (a)	2–1 (h)
Quarter-final	(Poland) Górnik Zabrze	2–1	2–0 (h)	0–1 (a)
Semi-final	(Spain) Real Madrid	4–3	1–0 (h)	3–3 (a)

Manchester United qualified for the competition as champions of England, having won the 1966–67 Football League First Division. They faced Maltese side Hibernians in the first round and won 4–0 in the home first leg; David Sadler and Denis Law scored two goals each. Despite the wide margin of victory, Brian Crowther of The Guardian described their play as disappointing. In the second leg, United suffered a "sad succession of near misses", according to a correspondent for The Guardian, as they struggled to adapt to the sandy pitch and the match finished as a goalless draw. They were drawn against Sarajevo of Yugoslavia in the second round, who were appearing in the competition for the first time. Playing the first leg away from home, Manchester United narrowly avoided going behind in the 27th minute, needing a goal-line save to prevent a shot from Vahidin Musemić going in. Despite playing against 10 men for most of the match after Boško Prodanović had to go off injured, United were not able to score, and it finished 0–0. John Aston gave United an early lead in the second leg, which was extended by George Best in the second half. Despite a late goal for Sarajevo from Salih Delalić, United held on to win 2–1 and progress to the quarter-finals.

United played the first leg of their quarter-final against Polish champions Górnik Zabrze at home. In the 60th minute, a shot by Best was deflected into his own net by Górnik defender Stefan Florenski. In the dying minutes of the game, Jimmy Ryan shot into a melee of players in the penalty area, including Brian Kidd, who backheeled the ball into the goal to make it 2–0. Playing on a snow-covered pitch in the second leg, Manchester United were forced to defend for most of the match, but only conceded once, when Włodzimierz Lubański scored in the 72nd minute. Despite losing the match 1–0, Manchester United progressed 2–1 on aggregate. United faced six-time European Cup winners Real Madrid in the semi-final. Despite dominating the first leg at home, a single goal from Best in the 36th minute separated the sides, and they took a 1–0 lead into the second leg. In Madrid, the hosts took the lead in the 32nd minute, with a headed goal from Pirri. In the last few minutes of the first half, three more goals were scored; Francisco Gento made it 2–0 to Madrid, then an own goal from Ignacio Zoco brought the gap back to one goal, before Amancio scored to make it 3–1 at half-time. Sustained pressure from United in the second half brought a goal for Sadler in the 73rd minute, which brought the aggregate score level. Five minutes later, Bill Foulkes added a third for Manchester United. The match finished 3–3; United won the tie 4–3 on aggregate to reach the European Cup final for the first time.

== Pre-match ==
The press rated Manchester United as favourites for the final. In The Guardian, Albert Barham suggested that Benfica were an ageing team, and that "the old skills seem to be declining". He rated them as less dangerous than they had been when United beat them two years prior. Hugh McIlvanney of The Observer noted that although he believed United should be rated as favourites, some of their team were "undeniably ordinary players", and they had "an alarming vulnerability in defence" and "an excessive dependence on one or two men in attack." The Lisbon-based newspaper A Bola reported after United's semi-final victory that "a meeting with Manchester is the worst thing that could have happened."

Manchester United had fitness concerns regarding Nobby Stiles, who had been suffering from a bruised knee, but he recovered in time to be included in the squad. Law underwent surgery on his knee on the Saturday preceding the final, and remained in hospital for the match. Manchester United stayed in Surrey for two nights before the match, and the day before, United named an unchanged team from their semi-final second leg victory over Real Madrid. Benfica stayed at the Saxon Inn in Harlow, Essex, and also named an unchanged team from their semi-final win over Juventus.

The two teams had uneven allocations of tickets; Benfica requested 10,000, compared to the 30,000 for which Manchester United asked. The demand for tickets far outstripped the supply. The Benfica management estimated that a further 1,000 of their fans travelled to London without a ticket, while 10,000 Manchester United fans had bought tickets on general sale at wembley before the quarter-finals. On the Monday prior to the match, standing tickets originally priced at 10 shillings were selling on the black market for £7, while seats which had been £2 were £20.

== Match ==
=== Summary ===
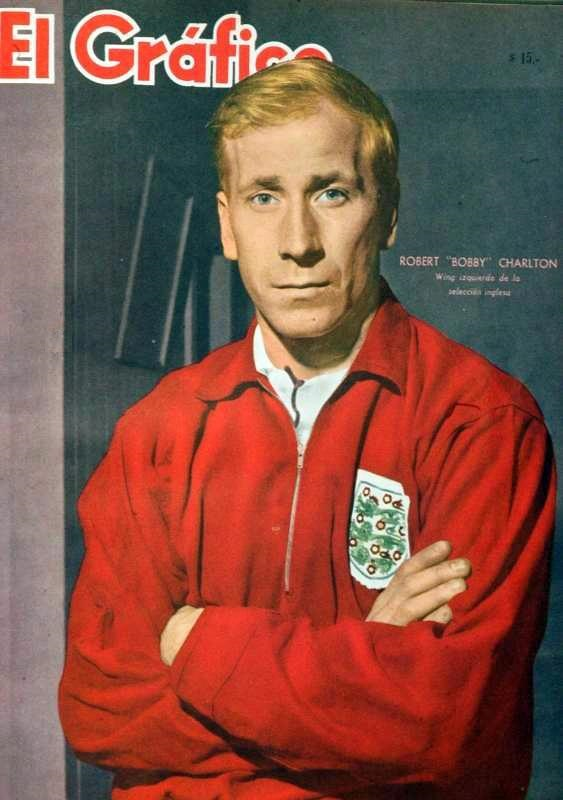
Bobby Charlton scored twice for Manchester United.

The final was played at Wembley Stadium in London on 29 May 1968 and kicked off at 19:45 BST in front of a crowd of 92,225; in addition, there was an estimated European television audience of 250 million. The referee was Concetto Lo Bello of Italy. Manchester United had the best of the play in the first half, but aggressive defence from Benfica prevented them from making a breakthrough. According to Eric Todd of The Guardian, Best was knocked down six times in the first half; three each by Fernando Cruz and Humberto, the latter of whom was cautioned in the 20th minute. In the 28th minute, Kidd passed the ball to Sadler, 10 yards from goal, but he shot wide. Benfica's three best chances on goal in the first half all came from Eusébio; the first was from a free kick, which deflected off the wall and drew a save from United goalkeeper Alex Stepney. Another free kick was struck high over the goal, before he hit the crossbar, having beaten Stepney with what Todd described as "the best shot of the first half".

Aston had two shots early in the second half, both saved by the Benfica goalkeeper, José Henrique. Eight minutes into the second half, Tony Dunne passed the ball to Sadler, who lobbed the ball into the Benfica area; Bobby Charlton jumped and headed the ball into the goal to give United a 1–0 lead. In the 79th minute, Augusto and Torres set up a goal for Jaime Graça, levelling the score at 1–1. In the last five minutes of normal time, Eusébio had two chances on goal, drawing saves from Stepney, who was applauded for his efforts by the Portuguese forward.

The score remained at 1–1 until the end of normal time, forcing the match into extra time. In the third minute of the additional period, Stepney took a long goal kick, which was headed on by Kidd, and collected by Best; he dribbled the ball past the defence, and then around the goalkeeper, before rolling the ball into an empty net. Two minutes later, a header from Sadler was saved by Henrique, but the rebound came to Kidd, who headed it in to give United a 3–1 lead. United continued to dominate play, and had another shot that hit the bar. Charlton completed the scoring in the ninth minute of extra time, converting a pass from Kidd to make it 4–1.

=== Details ===
29 May 1968
19:45 BST

Benfica (Portugal)	1–4 (a.e.t.)	(England) Manchester United
Graça 79'	Report	Charlton 53', 99'; Best 92'; Kidd 94'

Wembley Stadium, London
Attendance: 92,225
Referee: Concetto Lo Bello (Italy)

Benfica	Manchester United

GK	1	(Portugal) José Henrique
RB	2	(Portugal) Adolfo Calisto
CB	3	(Portugal) Humberto Fernandes	(yellow card) 20'
CB	4	(Portugal) Jacinto Santos
LB	5	(Portugal) Fernando Cruz
RM	6	(Portugal) Jaime Graça
CM	7	(Portugal) Mário Coluna (c)
LM	8	(Portugal) José Augusto
RF	9	(Portugal) José Torres
CF	10	(Portugal) Eusébio
LF	11	(Portugal) António Simões
Substitute:
GK	12	(Portugal) Nascimento
Manager:
(Brazil) Otto Glória

GK	1	(England) Alex Stepney
RB	2	(Republic of Ireland) Shay Brennan
LB	3	(Republic of Ireland) Tony Dunne
RM	4	(Scotland) Paddy Crerand
CB	5	(England) Bill Foulkes
LM	6	(England) Nobby Stiles
RF	7	(Northern Ireland) George Best
CF	8	(England) Brian Kidd
CM	9	(England) Bobby Charlton (c)
CB	10	(England) David Sadler
LF	11	(England) John Aston
Substitute:
GK	12	(England) Jimmy Rimmer
Manager:
(Scotland) Matt Busby

Man of the Match:
John Aston (Manchester United)

== Post-match ==
United's win meant that they became the first English team to win the European Cup, a year after Celtic of Scotland had become the first British team to do so. The win also marked the culmination of Manchester United's 10 years of rebuilding after the Munich air disaster; two of the team, Charlton and Foulkes, were survivors of the crash. As European Cup champions, Manchester United contested the 1968 Intercontinental Cup against Estudiantes, winners of the 1968 Copa Libertadores. Manchester United lost the tie, 2–1 on aggregate. Both Benfica and Manchester United competed in the European Cup again in 1968–69: Benfica were eliminated in the quarter-finals by Ajax, while Manchester United reached the semi-finals, where they were beaten by AC Milan.

== See also ==
- 1967–68 S.L. Benfica season
- 1967–68 Manchester United F.C. season
- 1968 European Cup Winners' Cup final
- 1968 Inter-Cities Fairs Cup final
- 1968 Intercontinental Cup
- S.L. Benfica in international football
- Manchester United F.C. in international football

== Notes and references ==
=== References ===
- Somerscales, Jillian; Murrell, Deborah; Pritchard, Louise, eds. (1998). The Official Manchester United Illustrated Encyclopedia. Manchester United Books. ISBN 0-233-99155-7.
