= Alan Gowling =

English footballer

Personal information
- Full name: Alan Edwin Gowling
- Date of birth: 16 March 1949 (age 77)
- Place of birth: Stockport, England
- Position: Forward

Senior career*
Years	Team	Apps	(Gls)
1966–1972	Manchester United	71	(18)
1972–1975	Huddersfield Town	128	(58)
1975–1978	Newcastle United	92	(30)
1978–1982	Bolton Wanderers	149	(28)
1982–1983	Preston North End	40	(5)
Total		480	(129)

International career
1971	England U23	1	(0)
- * Club domestic league appearances and goals

Alan Edwin Gowling (born 16 March 1949) is an English former footballer who played as a forward for several clubs in the north of England.

== Playing career ==
=== Club ===
Born in Stockport, Cheshire, Gowling went to Manchester United by way of county schools and Manchester University, where he studied for a degree in economics. He played for Manchester United juniors while at university, and once scored seven goals in a 'B' game. Due to his degree, he earned the nickname "Bamber", after Bamber Gascoigne, the host of University Challenge.

Gowling made a goalscoring league debut against Stoke City. Coincidentally, he also played his last game for Manchester United against Stoke City, coming on as a substitute for Bobby Charlton. He played 87 times for Manchester United and scored four in a game against Southampton on 20 February 1971. Nevertheless, Gowling was never really a first choice player at the club, and he enjoyed his longest run in the side when playing in midfield in his final season in 1971–72. He was sold to Huddersfield Town for £65,000 in June 1972.

After a disappointing period at Huddersfield that resulted in two relegations, he joined Newcastle United as a strike partner for Malcolm Macdonald. At Newcastle, he scored their only goal in the 1976 League Cup Final defeat at the hands of Manchester City. Nicknamed the "Galloping Chip", the workmanlike Gowling was preferred by Gordon Lee to the stylish Macdonald, scoring 30 goals in 92 league appearances before moving to Bolton Wanderers in 1978. He retired from football in 1984, aged 36, after a period at Preston North End.

=== International ===
Gowling gained England caps at amateur, schoolboy and under-23 level. Gowling represented the British Olympic side in the qualifying tournament for the 1968 Summer Olympics.

== After football ==
After his retirement, Gowling worked as general manager of a chemicals company in Buxton, Derbyshire.

== Career statistics ==
Club	Season	League		Cup		League Cup		Europe		Other		Total	
Club	Season	Apps	Goals	Apps	Goals	Apps	Goals	Apps	Goals	Apps	Goals	Apps	Goals
Manchester United	1967–68	5	1	0	0	0	0	0	0	0	0	5	1
Manchester United	1968–69	2	0	0	0	1	0	0	0	0	0	2	0
Manchester United	1969–70	7	3	0	0	1	0	–		–		8	3
Manchester United	1970–71	20	8	1	0	1	0	–		–		22	8
Manchester United	1971–72	37	6	7	2	6	1	–		–		50	9
Total		71	18	8	2	9	1	0	0	0	0	87	21

== Honours ==
Newcastle United

- Football League Cup runner-up: 1975–76

Individual

- Newcastle United Player of the Year: 1975–76
