= Danny Crerand =

English footballer (born 1969)

Personal information
- Full name: Daniel Bruno Crerand
- Date of birth: 5 May 1969 (age 57)
- Place of birth: Manchester, England
- Position: Midfielder

Youth career
- 1984-1986: Manchester United
- Chapel Villa

Senior career*
Years	Team	Apps	(Gls)
1988	Rochdale	3	(0)
1988–1989	Altrincham		
- * Club domestic league appearances and goals

Daniel Bruno Crerand (born 5 May 1969) is an English former professional footballer who played as a midfielder.

== Career ==
After playing for his local non-League team Chapel Villa and two seasons with hometown club Manchester United, Crerand signed for Football League side Rochdale on non-contract terms, making three appearances in the 1987–88 season. He later returned to non-League football with Altrincham.

== Personal life ==
His father Paddy was also a professional footballer, as was a second cousin Charlie Gallagher.
