= Brian Kidd =

English football manager (born 1949)

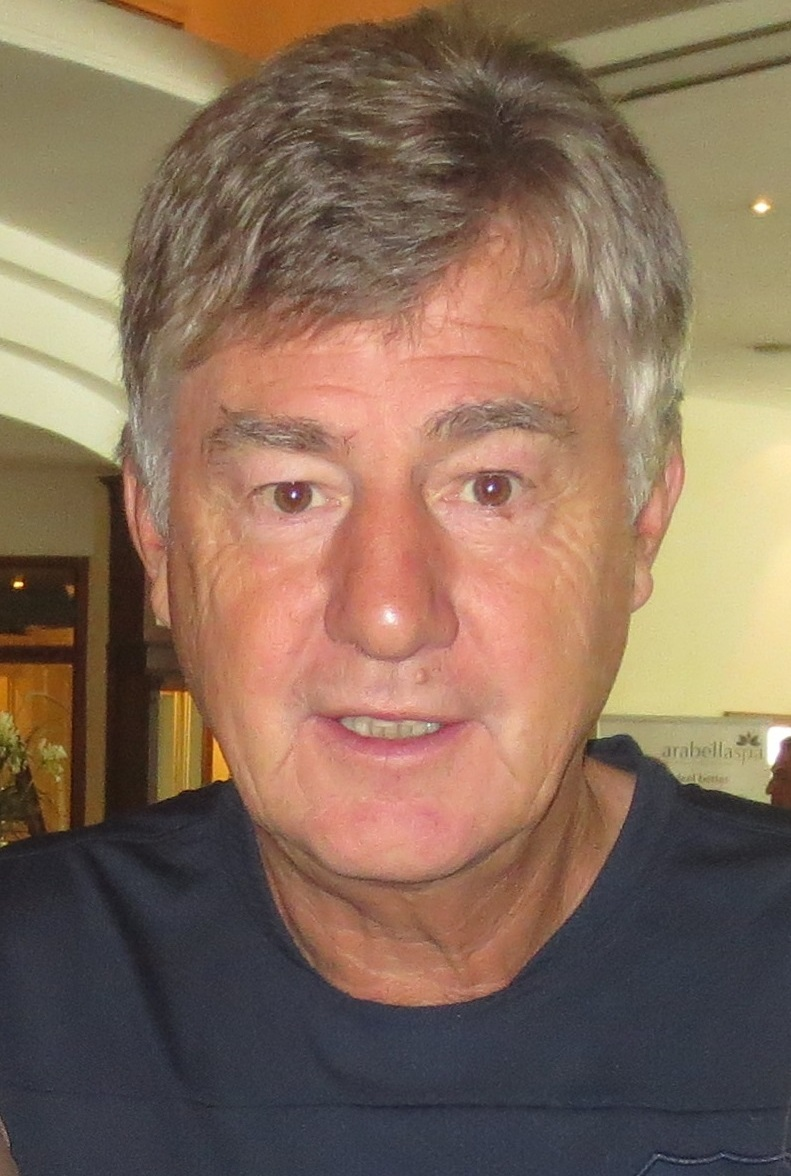
- Kidd in 2013

Personal information
- Full name: Brian Kidd
- Date of birth: 29 May 1949 (age 77)
- Place of birth: Manchester, England
- Height: 1.78 m (5 ft 10 in)
- Position: Forward

Youth career
- 1963–1967: Manchester United

Senior career*
Years	Team	Apps	(Gls)
1967–1974	Manchester United	203	(52)
1974–1976	Arsenal	77	(30)
1976–1979	Manchester City	98	(44)
1979–1980	Everton	40	(11)
1980–1982	Bolton Wanderers	43	(14)
1981	→ Atlanta Chiefs (loan)	27	(22)
1982–1983	Fort Lauderdale Strikers	44	(33)
1983	Fort Lauderdale Strikers (indoor)	2	(3)
1984	Minnesota Strikers	13	(8)
Total		545	(214)

International career
1967	England Youth	8	(2)
1967–1970	England U23	10	(5)
1970	England	2	(1)

Managerial career
- 1984–1985: Barrow
- 1986: Preston North End
- 1998–1999: Blackburn Rovers
- 2013: Manchester City (caretaker)
- * Club domestic league appearances and goals

Brian Kidd (born 29 May 1949) is an English football coach and former player who won the European Cup in 1968 with Manchester United. He was most recently assistant coach of Premier League club Manchester City.

Kidd, a striker, played for Manchester United, Arsenal, Manchester City, Everton, Bolton Wanderers, Fort Lauderdale Strikers and the Minnesota Strikers in his footballing career.

== Playing career ==
Kidd was born in Manchester, and started playing for Manchester United as a youngster, joining the club's academy in August 1964. Two years later, he went on to become a professional player with the club.

Kidd had the distinction of scoring on his 19th birthday for Manchester United in their 4–1 victory over Benfica in the 1968 European Cup Final. All in all, he scored 52 times in 203 league appearances for Manchester United.

Following United's relegation to the Football League Second Division in 1974, Kidd was transferred to Arsenal for £110,000. Kidd scored on his debut for Arsenal against Leicester City at Filbert Street. He then scored a brace at home against Manchester City. He was by far Arsenal's top goalscorer during the 1974–75 season, scoring 19 goals in 40 appearances. In the following season Kidd, on 20 March 1976, scored a hat-trick against West Ham United in a 6–1 win at Highbury. Altogether Kidd scored 34 times for Arsenal from 90 appearances. In July 1976, he was sold to Manchester City for a fee of £100,000.

With Manchester City, Kidd scored three times against rivals Manchester United, in a 3–1 win at Maine Road and a 2–2 draw at Old Trafford during the 1977–78 season. He would play 98 times for Manchester City, netting 44 goals. He then moved to Everton in March 1979 for £150,000. With the Toffees, Kidd netted 12 times in 44 appearances and was sent off in an FA Cup semi final against West Ham United. Kidd then joined Bolton Wanderers in May 1980 for £110,000. Kidd found the back of the net a total of 13 times for Bolton where he made a total of 43 appearances at and away from Burnden Park. He was then loaned out to NASL team Atlanta Chiefs in 1981. He played 29 times for the chiefs, scoring on 23 occasions.

In January 1982, Kidd moved on from Bolton to return to the NASL. He then signed with the Fort Lauderdale Strikers and two years afterward with the Minnesota Strikers. He was prolific with both teams when it came to goalscoring, but in 1984 he retired from the game.

== Management and coaching career ==
=== 1984–2008 ===
In 1984, Kidd began his coaching career at Barrow. He briefly managed Preston North End for several games in 1986 before resigning on the eve of a game against Southend United. Kidd then became involved in coaching young players before being brought back to Manchester United as a youth team coach by Alex Ferguson in 1988. Over the next three years Kidd helped to bring through a host of talented players like Ryan Giggs, David Beckham, Paul Scholes, Gary Neville and others in the Class of '92. When Ferguson's assistant Archie Knox moved to a similar capacity at Rangers in the summer of 1991, Kidd was promoted to the role of assistant manager. He helped Ferguson guide United to a Football League Cup win in 1992, the Premier League title in 1993, the double in 1994 and again in 1996, as well as another Premier League title in 1997.

Kidd left United to take charge at Blackburn Rovers in December 1998, replacing Roy Hodgson who had been sacked after Blackburn's poor start to the season left them in the relegation zone. Despite Kidd having a promising start with Rovers, which saw him voted Premier League Manager of the Month and having also spent nearly £20 million on new players in his first four months in charge he was unable to save them from being relegated from the Premier League (just four years after being champions) and Kidd was dismissed on 3 November 1999 with Rovers standing 19th in Division One.

In 1999, a rift developed between Kidd and Alex Ferguson after Kidd was strongly criticised in Ferguson's autobiography Managing My Life. Ferguson was angered that when Kidd was his assistant manager he had questioned United's 1998 summer signing of striker Dwight Yorke. Ferguson criticised Kidd's footballing judgement and wrote in his book: "I saw Brian Kidd as a complex person, often quite insecure, particularly about his health." Kidd was upset at Ferguson's attack on him and responded by saying: "I believe Walt Disney is trying to buy the film rights to his book as a sequel to Fantasia."

Kidd moved to Leeds United in May 2000 as youth coach but was promoted to act as Head Coach in March 2001 under David O'Leary then Terry Venables. He left Leeds in May 2003 after Peter Reid was appointed manager.

Meanwhile, Kidd was named as assistant to England manager Sven-Göran Eriksson in January 2003. He was forced to end this role in May 2004, just weeks before Euro 2004, due to undergoing surgery for prostate cancer. Kidd had recovered by February 2006.

In August 2006, former United player Roy Keane was appointed manager of Sunderland and there were reports that Keane wanted Kidd to become his assistant manager at the Stadium of Light. However, Kidd instead accepted an offer to work as assistant to Neil Warnock at Sheffield United a few months after their promotion to the Premier League. After the Blades were relegated and Warnock resigned, Kidd remained at Bramall Lane under new manager Bryan Robson (another former Manchester United player) but left the club after Robson departed in February 2008.

=== 2009–present ===
On 11 February 2009, Kidd was appointed as the assistant to caretaker manager Paul Hart at Premier League side Portsmouth. He stayed until August 2009, when he rejected a new contract offer.

Kidd became Technical Development Manager at Manchester City in September 2009, before becoming assistant manager to new boss Roberto Mancini on 19 December 2009, following the sacking of manager Mark Hughes.

In February 2011, Kidd said that he was willing to give Alex Ferguson "the benefit of the doubt" in the dispute that the two men had in the late 1990s. Kidd revealed that although there was no phone call from Ferguson when he was fighting prostate cancer in 2004, he was now speaking to Ferguson after matches again.

In the 2011 FA Cup Final, Manchester City won their first major trophy for 35 years after beating Stoke City 1–0. In the following 2011–12 season, City were crowned league champions for the first time since 1968. In an extraordinary finale to the season, City scored twice in stoppage time to beat Queens Park Rangers 3–2 in dramatic style to win the Premier League on goal difference from Manchester United. Together with Mancini and City's first team coach David Platt, Kidd raced on to the pitch to celebrate Sergio Agüero's title-winning goal for City.

Kidd served as caretaker manager for the final two games of the 2012–13 season, following the departure of Mancini. Kidd returned to his assistant role following the appointment of Manuel Pellegrini and worked with both him and his successor Pep Guardiola, before leaving after the 2020–21 season.

== International career ==
Kidd was capped twice for the England national football team with both of those appearances coming in 1970.

== Honours ==
=== Player ===
Manchester United

- European Cup: 1967–68
- FA Charity Shield: 1967

=== Manager ===
Individual

- Premier League Manager of the Month: December 1998

== Career statistics ==
=== Club ===
Appearances and goals by club, season and competition
Club	Season	League			FA Cup		League Cup		Continental		Other		Total	
Club	Season	Division	Apps	Goals	Apps	Goals	Apps	Goals	Apps	Goals	Apps	Goals	Apps	Goals
Manchester United	1967–68	First Division	38	15	2	0	—		9 (Note: Appearances in European Cup)	2	1 (Note: Appearance in FA Charity Shield)	0	50	17
Manchester United	1968–69	First Division	29	1	5	2	—		7	1	1 (Note: Appearance in Intercontinental Cup)	0	42	4
Manchester United	1969–70	First Division	34	12	9	6	6	2	—		—		49	20
Manchester United	1970–71	First Division	25	8	2	0	6	5	—		3 (Note: Appearance(s) in Watney Mann Invitation Cup)	0	36	13
Manchester United	1971–72	First Division	34	10	4	0	5	0	—		1	0	44	10
Manchester United	1972–73	First Division	22	4	1	0	2	0	—		2 (Note: Appearances in Anglo-Italian Cup)	0	27	4
Manchester United	1973–74	First Division	21	2	2	0	1	0	—		—		24	2
Manchester United	Total		203	52	25	8	20	7	16	3	8	0	272	70
Arsenal	1974–75	First Division	40	19	8	3	2	1	—		—		50	23
Arsenal	1975–76	First Division	37	11	1	0	2	0	—		—		40	11
Arsenal	Total		77	30	9	3	4	1	0	0	0	0	90	34
Manchester City	1976–77	First Division	39	21	4	1	0	0	2 (Note: Appearances in UEFA Cup)	1	—		45	23
Manchester City	1977–78	First Division	39	16	2	1	7	3	2	0	—		50	20
Manchester City	1978–79	First Division	20	7	3	2	4	0	6	5	—		33	14
Manchester City	Total		98	44	9	4	11	3	10	6	0	0	128	57
Everton	1978–79	First Division	9	2	—		—		—		—		9	2
Everton	1979–80	First Division	31	9	4	4	5	4	2	0	—		42	17
Everton	Total		40	11	4	4	5	4	2	0	0	0	51	19
Bolton Wanderers	1980–81	Second Division	33	13	2	0	2	1	—		—		37	14
Bolton Wanderers	1981–82	Second Division	10	1	0	0	2	1	—		0	0	12	2
Bolton Wanderers	Total		43	14	2	0	4	2	0	0	0	0	49	16
Atlanta Chiefs (loan)	1981	NASL	27	22	—		—		—		—		27	22
Fort Lauderdale Strikers	1982	NASL	23	15	—		—		—		—		23	15
Fort Lauderdale Strikers	1983	NASL	21	18	—		—		—		—		21	18
Fort Lauderdale Strikers	Total		44	33	0	0	0	0	0	0	0	0	44	33
Minnesota Strikers	1984	NASL	13	8	—		—		—		—		13	8
Career total			545	214	49	19	44	17	28	9	8	0	676	259

=== International ===
Appearances and goals by national team and year
National team	Year	Apps	Goals
England	1970	2	1
Total		2	1

Scores and results list England's goal tally first, score column indicates score after each Kidd's goal.

List of international goals scored by Brian Kidd
No.	Date	Venue	Opponent	Score	Result	Competition
1	24 May 1970	Estadio Olímpico Atahualpa, Quito, Ecuador	Ecuador	2–0	2–0	Friendly

== Managerial statistics ==
Team	Nat	From	To	Record				
Team	Nat	From	To	G	W	D	L	Win %
Preston North End	ENG	5 December 1986	1 March 1986	19	2	5	12	10.53
Blackburn Rovers	ENG	4 December 1998	3 November 1999	44	12	18	14	27.27
Manchester City	ENG	13 May 2013	14 June 2013	2	1	0	1	50.00
Total				52	13	20	19	25.00
