= Nobby Stiles =

English footballer (1942–2020)

Nobby Stiles MBE
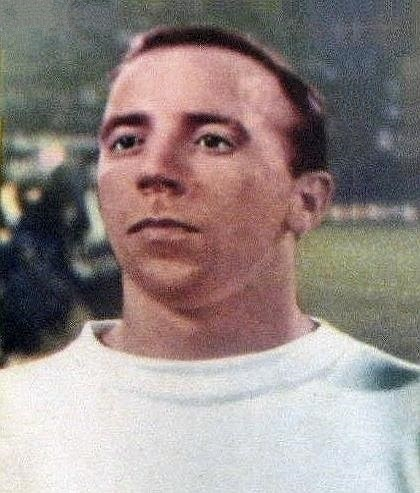
- Stiles in 1966

Personal information
- Full name: Norbert Peter Stiles
- Date of birth: 18 May 1942
- Place of birth: Collyhurst, Manchester, England
- Date of death: 30 October 2020 (aged 78)
- Place of death: Manchester, England
- Height: 5 ft 6 in (1.68 m)
- Position: Defensive midfielder

Youth career
- 1957–1960: Manchester United

Senior career*
Years	Team	Apps	(Gls)
1960–1971	Manchester United	311	(17)
1971–1973	Middlesbrough	57	(2)
1973–1975	Preston North End	46	(1)
Total		414	(20)

International career
1965–1968	Football League XI	3	(0)
1965–1970	England	28	(1)

Managerial career
- 1977–1981: Preston North End
- 1981–1984: Vancouver Whitecaps
- 1985–1986: West Bromwich Albion
Medal record
Men's football
Representing England
FIFA World Cup
Winner	1966 England
- * Club domestic league appearances and goals

Norbert Peter Stiles (18 May 1942 – 30 October 2020) was an English professional footballer. He played for England for five years, winning 28 caps and scoring one goal. He played every minute of England's victorious 1966 FIFA World Cup campaign, including the final, which England won 4–2 against West Germany. His post-match dance on the Wembley pitch, holding the World Cup trophy in one hand and his false teeth in the other, was widely broadcast.

Stiles spent the majority of his club career at Manchester United, spending eleven years at Old Trafford, where he became renowned for his tough tackling and ball-winning qualities. Jonathan Wilson, writing for The Guardian in 2013, labelled Stiles as a type of holding midfielder he described as a "destroyer", a player who is primarily tasked with running, winning back possession and distributing the ball to other players.

With the Red Devils, he won two League titles and one European Cup. Stiles is one of only three Englishmen, alongside Bobby Charlton and Ian Callaghan, to have won both the World Cup and European Cup.

Stiles also had short spells with Middlesbrough and Preston North End.

== Early life ==
Stiles grew up in Collyhurst, a working-class district of North Manchester, attending the local St Patrick's Catholic (Primary) School. He was born in the cellar of the family home during an air raid, the son of Charlie, a manager of an undertakers' parlour in a family business, and Kitty, who supplemented the family income working as a machinist. He was of Irish descent.

== Club career ==
=== Manchester United ===
Stiles supported Manchester United and his talent was swiftly recognised when he played for England Schoolboys at the age of 15. He achieved a childhood ambition when, in the same year, the club he supported gave him an apprenticeship in September 1959.

Stiles was an unlikely-looking footballer in many ways – he was short, at a time when teenagers were being rejected by clubs purely because of their lack of height; he also had several teeth missing and wore dentures, the removal of which prior to matches gave him a gap-toothed expression which had the potential to scare. He became significantly bald at a young age and sported a dramatic comb-over. He was also severely short-sighted and needed strong contact lenses when playing, and wore thick spectacles off the field.

Nevertheless, Manchester United manager Matt Busby saw something in Stiles. He was given his debut as a full back in October 1960 against Bolton Wanderers. Stiles's simple passing game and ball-winning skills saw his conversion into a "holding" midfield player of a type now a feature of all top teams but still a rarity at a time when forward lines consisted of five players and the midfield was restricted to covering half-backs. His ability to gain and retain possession also allowed his teammates, such as Bobby Charlton and, later, George Best, to utilise more space on the field. Stiles's defensive skills were also utilised by United managers to great effect throughout his career.

That said, Busby was not afraid to sacrifice Stiles when required and when United beat Leicester City 3–1 in the 1963 FA Cup final, Stiles was not picked for the game. He began to make more frequent appearances in the seasons ahead, however, and won the First Division title in 1965.

In 1967, Stiles won his second League championship medal with Manchester United, but greater club honours were to come. United reached the European Cup final, which was to be staged at Wembley, and Stiles's old nemesis Eusébio was again someone he had to deal with as part of a fearsome attacking potential posed by opponents Benfica. Stiles played well without keeping Eusébio wholly quiet; with the score at 1–1 and just a few minutes left, the Portuguese legend got away from the United defence with just goalkeeper Alex Stepney to beat, yet only managed to slam the ball straight into Stepney's midriff. United won 4–1 and became the first English club to lift Europe's main trophy.

=== Later career ===
After 395 matches and 19 goals, Manchester United sold Stiles in 1971 to Middlesbrough for £20,000. Two years later, he became a player-coach at Preston North End when Bobby Charlton was manager.

== International career ==
=== 1966 FIFA World Cup ===
With England hosting the World Cup in 1966, manager Alf Ramsey had no competitive qualifying campaign to prepare; therefore, he spent the prior two years meticulously assessing players in friendly matches and British Home Championship games. With Bobby Charlton the only certainty for his World Cup midfield, he needed to create a trio of players to complement the Manchester United attacker and among those was the requirement for a "spoiler". Stiles was tested out for this role in a 2–2 draw against Scotland at Wembley on 10 April 1965. He kept his place for eight of the next nine internationals, scoring the only goal in a Wembley win against West Germany along the way, and by the time Ramsey confirmed his 22, it was thought likely that he would be in England's starting team for the World Cup.

Stiles won his 15th cap as England kicked off the competition with a goalless draw against Uruguay and maintained his place as the uncompromising hardman playing ahead of the back four and making sure there was space and time for the likes of Charlton ahead of him. With Stiles not missing a minute, England progressed through the group with wins over Mexico and France and then scraped past a violent Argentina side in the last eight. In the France game, Stiles seriously injured their midfielder Jacques Simon with a late tackle and there were calls from the media and FA for Stiles to be dropped. Ramsey publicly defended Stiles, being sure that the tackle was mistimed rather than malicious.

In the semi-final, Stiles performed an effective man-marking job on the Portuguese prolific goalscorer Eusébio, to the extent that the skilled player was essentially nullified for the whole match, which England won 2–1. His tactics, despite the criticism they provoked from some, were effective; Eusébio's only major contribution was a late penalty, in a match where both sides were considered to have played attractive football in a good spirit with few fouls, and England progressed to the final. In the dressing room afterwards, Ramsey praised Stiles's individual performance, a rare accolade.

Stiles, winning his 20th cap, had no man-marking brief against West Germany but played a strong, tough match as England saw a 2–1 lead levelled with the last kick of the game before Geoff Hurst completed a hat-trick to win the competition in extra time. At the final whistle, Stiles did a spontaneous jig with the Jules Rimet Trophy in his hand while holding his false teeth in the other. Thirty years later this moment would be referred to by Frank Skinner and David Baddiel in the lyrics to "Three Lions", the England theme song written with the Lightning Seeds for Euro 96: in the 1996 version, a list of English football memories ends with "...Nobby dancing"; and in the 1998 version, in a reference to the World Cup finals taking place in France, the middle section consists of the line: "We can dance Nobby's dance, we can dance it in France".

=== UEFA Euro 1968 and 1970 FIFA World Cup ===
Stiles played in the next four internationals, but was deemed to have performed poorly as England lost to Scotland at Wembley in 1967 and was dropped by Ramsey. Stiles was selected for the England squad which contested the 1968 European Championships, but the holding role in midfield had been taken by Tottenham Hotspur's Alan Mullery. England went out to Yugoslavia in the semi-finals, during which Mullery became the first ever England player to be sent off. Stiles was recalled for the otherwise meaningless third place play-off game against the Soviet Union, but it was clear that despite his misdemeanour, Mullery was now Ramsey's first choice.

Stiles played just once for England in 1969 and twice in 1970. He was selected by Ramsey for the 1970 World Cup in Mexico, but only as Mullery's understudy. Not only did he not get a kick during the competition, as England surrendered the title in the quarter-final, but he never played for his country again. He ended with 28 caps – ultimately the least capped member of the 1966 XI – and one goal.

== Managerial and post-playing career ==
In August 1975, Stiles was appointed as caretaker manager of Preston when Bobby Charlton resigned in protest at the transfer of defender John Bird to Newcastle United, but he resigned a week later in support of his former Manchester United teammate. Stiles returned to Preston to serve as manager from 22 July 1977 to 5 June 1981 when he was sacked along with his assistant after the club were relegated.

Stiles joined the exodus of ageing and semi-retired European players to the NASL in 1981, to become coach of the Vancouver Whitecaps, spending three years at the Canadian club.

On 29 September 1985, Stiles took over as manager of West Bromwich Albion; however, he was sacked the following February after the side managed only three wins under his leadership, and this was his final stab at management. He later revealed his struggle with depression while in the job, finding it tough to cope with working in the Midlands and the daily commute from Manchester where his family lived.

Between 1989 and 1993 he worked for Manchester United as their youth team coach, developing the considerable skills of teenage prodigies such as David Beckham, Ryan Giggs and Paul Scholes. Nicky Butt and the Neville brothers, Gary and Phil, also came through at this time.

In 2000, Stiles was awarded an MBE after a campaign by sections of the media who highlighted that five of the 1966 team had never been officially decorated for their achievements. Stiles duly joined Alan Ball, Roger Hunt, Ray Wilson and George Cohen in collecting his award.

== Personal life ==
Stiles married Kay Giles in June 1963. His wife was a sister of Johnny Giles and they were introduced to each other around the time they were teammates at Manchester United. They lived in Manchester and had three children. Stiles' son John was also a footballer, playing for Shamrock Rovers in Dublin and Leeds United in the 1980s.

Stiles was a devout Catholic throughout his life and even tried to attend Mass on the day of the World Cup final. In 1968, Stiles released his first autobiography, Soccer My Battlefield; his second, After the Ball, followed in 2003. In 2007, he was inducted into the English Football Hall of Fame.

Stiles's FIFA World Cup medal and a European Cup medal were bought by Manchester United for more than £200,000 at an auction on 27 October 2010. The World Cup medal, which Stiles won in the 1966 final against West Germany, sold for £160,000. His European Cup medal, which he won with Manchester United in 1968, was also sold, reaching more than £49,000. Stiles sold the medals so that his family could benefit from the proceeds.

A teenage Stiles, then a Manchester United apprentice, was portrayed by actor Kyle Ward in a 2011 BBC TV drama, United, which was centred around the Munich air disaster in 1958, in which eight of United's senior players died.

On 24 November 2013, it was announced that Stiles was diagnosed with prostate cancer, and in 2016, it was announced that he was suffering from advanced dementia. He was too ill to attend a celebration dinner to mark the 50th anniversary of England's 1966 World Cup win. In November 2017, a BBC documentary on the subject of brain injuries amongst retired footballers presented by former England striker Alan Shearer included an interview with Stiles' son.

Stiles died on 30 October 2020 at Manor Hay Care Centre in Manchester, aged 78. He had been suffering from prostate cancer and dementia, the latter brought on due to chronic traumatic encephalopathy (CTE) from the repeated heading of footballs. Stiles's brain was donated to the FIELD study conducted by Dr Willie Stewart into the link between dementia and a career in professional football. Stiles was one of five England players from the 1966 World Cup final who suffered from and in some cases died of dementia. In July 2026 a coroner ruled that Stiles's dementia had been caused by repeatedly heading a football throughout his career.

== Career statistics ==
=== Club ===
Appearances and goals by club, season and competition
Club	Season	League			FA Cup		League Cup		Europe		Other		Total	
Club	Season	Division	Apps	Goals	Apps	Goals	Apps	Goals	Apps	Goals	Apps	Goals	Apps	Goals
Manchester United	1960–61	First Division	26	2	3	0	2	0	—		—		31	2
Manchester United	1961–62	First Division	34	7	4	0	—		—		—		38	7
Manchester United	1962–63	First Division	31	2	4	0	—		—		—		35	2
Manchester United	1963–64	First Division	17	0	2	0	—		2 (Note: Appearances in European Cup Winners' Cup)	0	0	0	21	0
Manchester United	1964–65	First Division	41	0	7	0	—		11 (Note: Appearances in Inter-Cities Fairs Cup)	0	—		59	0
Manchester United	1965–66	First Division	39	2	7	0	—		8 (Note: Appearances in European Cup)	1	1 (Note: Appearance in FA Charity Shield)	0	55	3
Manchester United	1966–67	First Division	37	3	2	0	1	0	—		—		40	3
Manchester United	1967–68	First Division	20	0	0	0	—		7	0	1	0	28	0
Manchester United	1968–69	First Division	41	1	6	0	—		8	1	1 (Note: Appearance in Intercontinental Cup)	0	56	2
Manchester United	1969–70	First Division	8	0	3	0	2	0	—		—		13	0
Manchester United	1970–71	First Division	17	0	0	0	2	0	—		—		19	0
Manchester United	Total		311	17	38	0	7	0	36	2	3	0	395	19
Middlesbrough	1971–72	Second Division	25	1	6	0	2	0	—		—		33	1
Middlesbrough	1972–73	Second Division	32	1	1	0	3	0	—		—		36	1
Middlesbrough	Total		57	2	7	0	5	0	0	0	0	0	69	2
Preston North End	1973–74	Second Division	27	1	1	0	1	0	—		—		29	1
Preston North End	1974–75	Third Division	19	0	2	0	0	0	—		—		21	0
Preston North End	Total		46	1	3	0	1	0	0	0	0	0	50	1
Career total			414	20	48	0	13	0	36	2	3	0	514	22

=== International ===
Appearances and goals by national team and year
National team	Year	Apps	Goals
England	1965	8	0
England	1966	15	1
England	1967	1	0
England	1968	1	0
England	1969	1	0
England	1970	2	0
Total		28	1

Scores and results list England's goal tally first, score column indicates score after each Stiles goal.

List of international goals scored by Nobby Stiles
No.	Date	Venue	Opponent	Score	Result	Competition
1	23 February 1966	Wembley Stadium, London	West Germany	1–0	1–0	Friendly

== Honours ==
Manchester United

- Football League First Division: 1964–65, 1966–67
- FA Cup: 1962–63
- FA Charity Shield: 1965 (shared), 1967 (shared)
- European Cup: 1967–68

England

- FIFA World Cup: 1966

Individual

- Football League 100 Legends: 1998 (inducted)
- English Football Hall of Fame: 2007 (inducted)
- PFA Team of the Century (1907–1976): 2007
- FAI International Football Awards – International Personality: 1998
