= 1967 FA Charity Shield =

- The match programme cover
- Event: FA Charity Shield
Manchester United	Tottenham Hotspur
3	3
- Date: 12 August 1967
- Venue: Old Trafford, Manchester
- Referee: Eric Jennings
- Attendance: 54,106

The 1967 FA Charity Shield was the 45th FA Charity Shield, an annual football match held between the winners of the previous season's Football League and FA Cup competitions. The match was contested by Manchester United, who had won the 1966–67 Football League, and Tottenham Hotspur, who had won the 1966–67 FA Cup, at Old Trafford, Manchester, on 12 August 1967. The match was drawn 3–3, which meant that the two clubs shared the Shield, holding it for six months each. Bobby Charlton scored two goals for United, while Denis Law scored their third. Jimmy Robertson and Frank Saul scored for Spurs, but the match is most famous for Tottenham's second goal, which was scored by goalkeeper Pat Jennings. Ball in hand, Jennings punted it downfield, only for it to bounce in front of United goalkeeper Alex Stepney, over his head and into the goal.

== Match details ==
12 August 1967
15:00 BST

Manchester United	3–3	Tottenham Hotspur
Charlton; Law	Report	Robertson; Jennings; Saul

Old Trafford, Manchester
Attendance: 54,106
Referee: Eric Jennings

Manchester United	Tottenham Hotspur

GK	1	(England) Alex Stepney
DF	2	(Republic of Ireland) Shay Brennan
DF	3	(Republic of Ireland) Tony Dunne
MF	4	(Scotland) Paddy Crerand
DF	5	(England) Bill Foulkes
DF	6	(England) Nobby Stiles
FW	7	(Northern Ireland) George Best
FW	8	(England) Brian Kidd
MF	9	(England) Bobby Charlton
FW	10	(Scotland) Denis Law (c)
FW	11	(England) John Aston
Manager:
(Scotland) Matt Busby

GK	1	(Northern Ireland) Pat Jennings
DF	2	(Republic of Ireland) Joe Kinnear
DF	3	(England) Cyril Knowles
MF	4	(England) Alan Mullery
DF	5	(Wales) Mike England
DF	6	(Scotland) Dave Mackay (c)
MF	7	(Scotland) Jimmy Robertson
FW	8	(England) Jimmy Greaves
FW	9	(Scotland) Alan Gilzean
MF	10	(England) Terry Venables
MF	11	(England) Frank Saul
Manager:
(England) Bill Nicholson

== See also ==
- 1966–67 Football League
- 1966–67 FA Cup
