= Ian Storey-Moore =

English footballer

Personal information
- Date of birth: 17 January 1945 (age 81)
- Place of birth: Ipswich, England
- Position: Forward

Youth career
- Scunthorpe United

Senior career*
Years	Team	Apps	(Gls)
1962–1972	Nottingham Forest	236	(105)
1972–1974	Manchester United	39	(11)
1974–1975	Burton Albion	?	(7)
1975	Chicago Sting	14	(2)
1975–1977	Burton Albion	107	(42)
1977–1978	Shepshed Charterhouse	?	(?)
1978–1981	Burton Albion	40	(10)

International career
1970	England	1	(0)

Managerial career
- 1977–1978: Shepshed Charterhouse (player-manager)
- 1978–1981: Burton Albion (player-manager)
- * Club domestic league appearances and goals

Ian Storey-Moore (born 17 January 1945) is an English former association football forward. He scored over 100 league goals for Nottingham Forest and earned one cap for England during his time there. In 1972, he moved to Manchester United, but his league career was brought to an early end by injury in 1974. He went on to play for non-league Burton Albion, as well as North American Soccer League side Chicago Sting. He later served as player-manager for Shepshed Charterhouse, and for Burton Albion in his third spell at the club, before becoming chief scout at Nottingham Forest and Aston Villa.

== Nottingham Forest ==
Storey-Moore was playing junior football in Scunthorpe when he was spotted by a scout for Nottingham Forest, for whom he signed in May 1961. Johnny Carey became Forest manager in 1963, and he assembled a team including Storey-Moore, Joe Baker and Alan Hinton that, for a long spell, went largely unchallenged in competing for the 1966–67 Football League title. They beat title rivals Manchester United 4–1 at the City Ground on 1 October 1966. The 3–0 win against Aston Villa on 15 April had Forest second in the table, a point behind United. Injuries eventually took effect, meaning Forest had to settle for second place; they also lost in the 1966–67 FA Cup semi-final to Dave Mackay's Tottenham Hotspur.

At Forest, Storey-Moore collected his sole England cap in a game against the Netherlands in 1970. Up until his departure in March 1972, he scored 105 goals in his 236 league games for the club.

== Manchester United ==
In March 1972, Storey-Moore was announced by Derby County manager Brian Clough as having signed for the club, with a fee of £225,000 reportedly agreed. However, Storey-Moore instead opted to sign for Manchester United, managed by Frank O'Farrell. In 1974, he suffered an injury that brought his league career to an end. He had scored 12 goals for United.

== Burton Albion ==
Following his injury, Storey-Moore signed for Southern League side Burton Albion, having been convinced to join by manager Ken Gutteridge. He played for Burton for three seasons from 1974 to 1977, including a spell at North American Soccer League side Chicago Sting in 1975, before moving to Shepshed Charterhouse for his first managerial role in 1977. Storey-Moore returned to Burton as player-manager from 1978 to 1981, before retiring from the game.

== After playing ==
Storey-Moore later became a bookmaker in Nottingham and worked as Forest's chief scout. He went on to work as chief scout at Aston Villa, leaving the role when Martin O'Neill resigned as manager. Storey-Moore occasionally accompanies Forest supporters on ground and museum tours.
