= Carlo Sartori =

Italian footballer (born 1948)

Personal information
- Full name: Carlo Domenico Sartori
- Date of birth: 10 February 1948 (age 78)
- Place of birth: Caderzone, Italy
- Position: Midfielder

Youth career
- 1963–1965: Manchester United

Senior career*
| Years | Team | Apps | (Gls) |
| 1965–1973 | Manchester United | 55 | (6) |
- Bologna
- US Lecce
- SPAL 1907
- Rimini
- Trentino
- * Club domestic league appearances and goals

Carlo Domenico Sartori (born 10 February 1948) is an Italian former footballer.

== Career ==
Born in Caderzone, Italy, the Sartoris moved to Manchester when Carlo was a child, and he grew up in the Collyhurst area of the city.

He came through the Manchester United youth team in the mid-1960s and was one of the first non-British or Irish players to come up through the junior ranks at the club. He signed as an apprentice with the club in July 1963, at the age of 15, turned professional at the age of 17, and made his debut for the club in October 1968, coming on as a substitute for Francis Burns in a 2–2 away draw against Tottenham Hotspur, becoming the club's very first non-British or Irish player.

He left in 1973, with a total of 55 appearances and 6 goals for Manchester United, and returned to Italy to sign for Bologna where he was part of the team that won the Coppa Italia 1973–74. He would later play for Lecce, SPAL 1907, Rimini and Trentino before retiring in 1984. With US Lecce, he won the Serie C title in 1975–1976 and, most importantly, the Anglo–Italian Cup by defeating Scarborough in the championship game (4-1).
