= Willie Watson (footballer, born 1949) =

Scottish footballer (1949–2026)

Personal information
- Full name: William Watson
- Date of birth: 4 December 1949
- Place of birth: New Stevenston, Scotland
- Date of death: 30 March 2026 (aged 76)
- Height: 1.75 m (5 ft 9 in)
- Position: Defender

Senior career*
Years	Team	Apps	(Gls)
1970–1973	Manchester United	11	(0)
1973	→ Miami Toros (loan)	19	(0)
1973–1978	Motherwell	127	(2)
1978–1980	Dundee	39	(0)
1980–1984	Phoenix Inferno (indoor)	135	(32)
Total		331	(34)
- * Club domestic league appearances and goals

William Watson (4 December 1949 – 30 March 2026) was a Scottish footballer, who played as a defender.

Watson signed with Manchester United F.C in 1970. He made limited appearances for the club and spent part of 1973 on loan with the Miami Toros of the North American Soccer League. After returning to England, Watson made a free transfer to Motherwell. In 1978, Watson moved to Dundee for two seasons. In 1980, he moved to the United States and signed with the Phoenix Inferno of the Major Indoor Soccer League. He spent four seasons with Phoenix. In the last season, the team was renamed the Phoenix Pride because the new Mormon ownership objected to the reference to hell. Watson died on 30 March 2026, at the age of 76.
