= Tony Dunne =

Irish international footballer (1941–2020)

Personal information
- Full name: Anthony Peter Dunne
- Date of birth: 24 July 1941
- Place of birth: Dublin, Ireland
- Date of death: 8 June 2020 (aged 78)
- Height: 5 ft 6 in (1.68 m)
- Position: Left-back

Youth career
- Stella Maris

Senior career*
Years	Team	Apps	(Gls)
1958–1960	Shelbourne	18	(1)
1960–1973	Manchester United	414	(2)
1973–1979	Bolton Wanderers	170	(0)
1979	Detroit Express	12	(0)
Total		614	(3)

International career
1962–1975	Republic of Ireland	33	(0)

Managerial career
- 1982–1983: Steinkjer FK
- * Club domestic league appearances and goals

Anthony Peter Dunne (24 July 1941 – 8 June 2020) was an Irish footballer who played as a left-back. Born in Dublin, he began his career with youth side Stella Maris before signing for Drumcondra-based Shelbourne, with whom he won the FAI Cup in his second year in the senior team in 1960. That year, he moved to England to play for Manchester United, for whom he made more than 500 appearances in 13 years, winning the First Division in 1965 and 1967, the FA Cup in 1963 and the European Cup in 1968. After being released in 1973, he signed for Bolton Wanderers, making another almost 200 appearances in six years, before playing a single season with the Detroit Express in the North American Soccer League in 1979. Dunne won 33 caps for the Republic of Ireland between 1962 and 1975, and was named Irish Footballer of the Year in 1969. After retiring, he had a brief spell as manager of Norwegian club Steinkjer FK in 1982–83.

== Club career ==
=== Early career ===
Born in Dublin on 24 July 1941, Dunne played for Stella Maris as a schoolboy and Shelbourne from 1958 to 1960. Having helped Shelbourne win the FAI Youth Cup in 1959, he won the FAI Cup with them the following year, beating Cork Hibernians 2–0 in the final.

=== Manchester United ===
A week after the final, on 26 April 1960, he was signed by Manchester United for £5,000 as cover for Noel Cantwell and Shay Brennan. His debut for United came against Burnley on 15 October 1960, playing at left-back alongside Maurice Setters. He helped Manchester United win the FA Cup in 1963, and the First Division title 1965 and 1967. His highest honour came as part of the side that won the 1968 European Cup, beating Benfica 4–1 in the final. This was despite having ruptured his Achilles tendon in the quarter-final of the competition against Gornik Zabrze.

He made 535 appearances for Manchester United, behind only Bobby Charlton and Bill Foulkes at the time of his departure in 1973.

=== Bolton Wanderers ===
Dunne was released by Manchester United following the 1972–73 season, and signed for newly promoted Second Division side Bolton Wanderers in August 1973, though he returned to Manchester United for a testimonial match two months later. In six years with Bolton, he made almost 200 appearances and helped them win the Second Division in 1977–78.

=== Detroit Express ===
He joined Detroit Express in the North American Soccer League (NASL) in 1979.

== International career ==
He made his full international debut in the 3–2 home defeat by Austria on 8 April 1962. Over 13 years, he earned 33 caps, appearing in both full-back positions and at centre-half. He captained his country on four occasions. He was named Irish Footballer of the Year in 1969.

== Management career ==
After retiring from professional football, Dunne returned to Bolton as an assistant manager from 1979 to 1981; he then replaced his former Manchester United teammate Bill Foulkes as manager of Norwegian club Steinkjer FK in 1982–1983.

== Personal life ==
Dunne lived in Sale and ran a driving range in Altrincham. Tony Dunne had three children with his wife Ann. Two daughters and a son.

He died on 8 June 2020, aged 78.

== Honours ==
=== Shelbourne ===
- FAI Cup: 1959–60

=== Manchester United ===
- Football League First Division: 1964–65, 1966–67
- FA Cup: 1962–63
- European Cup: 1967–68
- FA Charity Shield: 1965, 1967

=== Bolton Wanderers ===
- Football League Second Division: 1977–78
