= David Sadler (footballer) =

English footballer

Personal information
- Date of birth: 5 February 1946 (age 80)
- Place of birth: Yalding, Kent, England
- Positions: Defender; midfielder; forward

Youth career
- ?–1963: Maidstone United
- Manchester United

Senior career*
Years	Team	Apps	(Gls)
1963–1973	Manchester United	272	(22)
1973	→ Miami Toros (loan)	1	(0)
1973–1977	Preston North End	105	(3)
Total		378	(25)

International career
1962–?	England Amateur	?	(?)
1967–1970	England	4	(0)
- * Club domestic league appearances and goals

David Sadler (born 5 February 1946 in Yalding, Kent, England) is an English former footballer. He was a skilful central defender who could also play usefully in midfield or even as a forward. He is secretary of the Manchester United Former Players' Association.

Sadler started his career with Maidstone United, but signed a professional contract with Manchester United in 1963, helping the club win the 1965 and 1967 First Division Football League championships as well as the 1968 European Cup. He left United in 1974 after scoring 27 goals for the club to join Preston North End, who were being managed by Sadler's former teammate Bobby Charlton.

He made 121 appearances (including one as substitute) for the Deepdale club and scored four goals before retiring due to injury in 1977, by which time Charlton had resigned as manager.

Sadler was capped four times for England.

== Post-football career ==
Sadler became a manager for a building society in Hale, Greater Manchester. He also became involved with Charlton in corporate hospitality.

== Career statistics ==
=== Club statistics ===
Appearances and goals by club, season and competition
Club	Season	First Division		FA Cup		League Cup		Europe		Other		Total	
Club	Season	Apps	Goals	Apps	Goals	Apps	Goals	Apps	Goals	Apps	Goals	Apps	Goals
Manchester United	1963–64	19	5	0	0	0	0	2	0	0	0	21	5
Manchester United	1964–65	6	1	0	0	0	0	0	0	0	0	6	1
Manchester United	1965–66	10	4	0	0	0	0	0	0	0	0	10	4
Manchester United	1966–67	36	5	2	0	1	0	0	0	0	0	39	5
Manchester United	1967–68	41	3	2	0	0	0	9	3	0	0	52	6
Manchester United	1968–69	29	0	1	0	0	0	5	0	2	0	37	0
Manchester United	1969–70	40	2	9	0	8	1	0	0	0	0	57	3
Manchester United	1970–71	32	1	2	0	5	0	0	0	0	0	39	1
Manchester United	1971–72	37	1	6	1	6	0	0	0	0	0	49	2
Manchester United	1972–73	19	0	1	0	2	0	0	0	0	0	22	0
Manchester United	1973–74	3	0	0	0	0	0	0	0	0	0	3	0
Manchester United	Total	272	22	23	1	22	1	16	3	2	0	335	27

=== International statistics ===
National team	Year	Apps	Goals
England	1967	2	0
England	1970	2	0
England	Career total	4	0
