= Paul Edwards (footballer, born 1947) =

English footballer

Personal information
- Full name: Paul Francis Edwards
- Date of birth: 7 October 1947 (age 79)
- Place of birth: Shaw and Crompton, Lancashire, England
- Height: 1.78 m (5 ft 10 in)
- Positions: Right-back; centre-back

Youth career
- 1963–1969: Manchester United

Senior career*
Years	Team	Apps	(Gls)
1969–1973	Manchester United	54	(0)
1972–1973	→ Oldham Athletic (loan)	2	(0)
1973–1978	Oldham Athletic	110	(7)
1976–1977	→ Stockport County (loan)	2	(0)
1978–1980	Stockport County	67	(2)

International career
1970	England U23	1	(0)
- * Club domestic league appearances and goals

Paul Francis Edwards (born 7 October 1947) is an English former footballer who played as a defender for Manchester United, Oldham Athletic and Stockport County.

Born in Shaw and Crompton, Lancashire, Edwards began his football career with Manchester United, signing his first amateur contract with them on 14 August 1963. He turned professional 18 months later, but it was another four years before he made his first team debut, playing in the 3–0 defeat away to Everton on 19 August 1969. His first goal for the club came in December of that year, In a League Cup semi-final against Manchester City on 17 December 1969, Edwards let fly with a long-range effort that flew past the City goalkeeper. It proved to be the highlight of Edwards' Manchester United career,he would score his second and final goal for United in the Watney Cup on 15th August 1970 . In his first full season with the club, Edwards made 28 appearances for Manchester United, but a run of bad form halfway through his second season resulted in a short period in the reserves. Up to that point, Edwards had mainly been deployed as a right-back, but when he returned to the first team, he was played at centre-back.

Frank O'Farrell took over as manager of Manchester United in June 1971, and Edwards fell out of favour in the new manager's team selections. He remained at the club for two more seasons, but he first team opportunities were limited. He was loaned to Oldham Athletic for six months in September 1972, before they signed him for £15,000 in the summer of 1973. The following season, Edwards helped the Latics to their second Third Division title. He stayed with them until 1978. After 112 appearances and seven goals, he moved to Stockport County, with whom he had spent a short period on loan in 1976–77. After 67 appearances and two goals for Stockport, Edwards retired from professional football.
