= Willie Morgan =

Scottish footballer

Willie Morgan MBE
Personal information
- Full name: William Alix Morgan
- Date of birth: 2 October 1944 (age 82)
- Place of birth: Troon, South Ayrshire, Scotland
- Position: Winger

Senior career*
Years	Team	Apps	(Gls)
1960–1968	Burnley	231	(22)
1968–1975	Manchester United	236	(25)
1975–1976	Burnley	16	(1)
1976–1980	Bolton Wanderers	154	(10)
1977	→ Chicago Sting (loan)	20	(3)
1978–1980	→ Minnesota Kicks (loan)	65	(4)
1980–1981	Blackpool	41	(1)
Total		681	(59)

International career
1967–1974	Scotland	26	(4)
- * Club domestic league appearances and goals

William Alix "Willie" Morgan MBE (born 2 October 1944) is a Scottish former professional footballer.

== Club career ==
A winger, Morgan started his career with Burnley, making his first-team debut against Sheffield Wednesday at Hillsborough in 1963. He took over from John Connelly who was transferred to Manchester United and scored his first Burnley goal, when he scored twice in a Boxing Day demolition of Manchester United in a 6–1 win at Turf Moor.

He made his Scotland debut against Northern Ireland at Belfast's Windsor Park in 1967.

He was transferred to Manchester United early in the 1968/9 League season, after Utd's John Aston had broken a leg. He scored 34 goals for United and led them to promotion in 1975 after one season in the Second Division. He played in the World Cup Finals of 1974, which took place in West Germany.

With Steve Coppell's signing in 1975, Morgan lost his place in the Manchester United team and returned to Burnley. His second spell at Turf Moor lasted less than a year. He moved to Bolton Wanderers, enjoying a successful spell at Burnden Park before finishing his career at Blackpool.

Morgan played summers on loan in the North American Soccer League in the late 1970s, playing for the Chicago Sting in 1977 and Minnesota Kicks the following three summers.

During his time at Manchester United, the band Tristar Airbus, a pseudonym for the future members of 10cc, recorded the song "Willie Morgan" in tribute to the footballer. It would later appear on the compilation Strawberry Bubblegum: A Collection of Pre-10CC Strawberry Studio Recordings 1969–1972.

== International career ==
Morgan won 26 caps for Scotland, and was selected for their 1974 World Cup squad. His cap tally was increased from 21 to 26 and goal tally from 1 to 4 following a decision by the Scottish Football Association in October 2021 to reclassify some tour matches in 1967 as full internationals.

== Personal life ==
After retiring, Morgan was involved in charity work, including for the NSPCC. In the 2023 Birthday Honours, he was appointed Member of the Order of the British Empire (MBE) for services to charity.

== Career statistics ==
=== International goals ===
#	Date	Venue	Opponent	Score	Result	Competition
1	16 May 1967	Ramat Gan Stadium, Ramat Gan	Israel	1–2	Win	Friendly match
2	31 May 1967	Norwood Oval, Adelaide	Australia	1–2	Win	Friendly match
3	13 June 1967	Alexander Park, Winnipeg	Canada Olympic team	2–7	Win	Friendly match (Note: Some reports assign a second goal to Morgan, elsewhere credited to Joe Harper.)
4	18 October 1972	Parken Stadium, Copenhagen, Denmark	Denmark	1–4	Win	1974 World Cup qualifier
Correct as of 10 October 2021

Sporting positions
Preceded by George Graham	Manchester United captain 1974-1975	Succeeded by Martin Buchan
