= Tommy O'Neil =

English footballer

Personal information
- Full name: Thomas Patrick O'Neil
- Date of birth: 25 October 1952
- Place of birth: St Helens, Merseyside, England
- Date of death: May 2006 (aged 53)
- Height: 5 ft 6 1/2 in (1.69 m)
- Position: Right back

Youth career
- 1968–1969: Manchester United

Senior career*
Years	Team	Apps	(Gls)
1969–1973	Manchester United	54	(0)
1973	→ Blackpool (loan)	7	(0)
1973–1978	Southport	197	(16)
1978–1980	Tranmere Rovers	74	(10)
1980–1982	Halifax Town	40	(2)
- * Club domestic league appearances and goals

Thomas Patrick O'Neil (25 October 1952 – May 2006) was an English footballer who played as a defender for various English clubs, including Manchester United, Southport and Tranmere Rovers.

Born in St Helens, Merseyside, O'Neil was a schoolboy international at both football and rugby league, but abandoned the oval ball in favour of the spherical one. He began his football career as an apprentice with Manchester United in 1968, and signed on as a professional in November 1969. He made his first team debut on 5 May 1971 in a 4–3 victory over Manchester City at Maine Road. A lack of quality competition for the right-back berth meant that O'Neil was a regular in that position throughout the 1971–72 season, missing just five games during the season. However, after Tommy Docherty replaced Frank O'Farrell as manager halfway through the 1972–73 season, O'Neil fell out of favour and was allowed to go on loan to Blackpool in March 1973. He made seven appearances for Blackpool, and, although he returned to Manchester United at the end of the spell, he left the club for Southport in August 1973.

In five seasons at Southport, O'Neil made 197 appearances and scored 16 goals before moving on to Tranmere Rovers in 1978. He made 74 appearances in two seasons with Tranmere, scoring 10 goals in the process, and was transferred to Halifax Town in 1980. After two years at Halifax, O'Neil retired from professional football and went into coaching. O'Neil eventually ended up back at Manchester United, coaching the club's academy teams from Under-9s to Under-16s until 2005. He died a year later at the age of 53.
