= John Aston Jr. =

English footballer

John Aston
Personal information
- Full name: John Aston
- Date of birth: 28 June 1947 (age 79)
- Place of birth: Manchester, England
- Height: 5 ft 10 in (1.78 m)
- Position: Left winger

Youth career
- 1962–1965: Manchester United

Senior career*
Years	Team	Apps	(Gls)
1965–1972	Manchester United	155	(25)
1972–1977	Luton Town	174	(31)
1977–1978	Mansfield Town	31	(4)
1978–1979	Blackburn Rovers	15	(2)
Total		375	(62)

International career
1969	England U23	1	(0)
- * Club domestic league appearances and goals

John Aston Jr. (born 28 June 1947) is an English former professional footballer who played in the Football League for Manchester United, Luton Town, Mansfield Town and Blackburn Rovers.

Aston was a forward who rose through the Manchester United youth system. His debut for the club came in 1965 against Leicester City. He went on to help the club win the 1967 League championship as well as the 1968 European Cup, where he provided a man of the match performance in the final against Benfica at Wembley Stadium on 29 May 1968. Aston scored 27 goals in 187 appearances before leaving the club in 1972 for Luton Town, later playing for Mansfield Town and Blackburn Rovers.

His father, John Aston Sr., also played for Manchester United in the immediate post-Second World War years, and was a coach at United during his son's playing career.

After retiring, Aston ran a pet stall in Glossop, High Peak, Derbyshire.

== Honours ==
=== Club ===
Manchester United

- First Division
  - Winner: 1966–67
- Charity Shield
  - Winner (2): 1965*, 1967* (*=shared)
- European Cup
  - Winner: 1967–68
- Intercontinental Cup
  - Runner-up: 1968

=== Individual ===
- 1968 European Cup Final Man of the Match
