= Paddy Crerand =

Scottish footballer (born 1939)

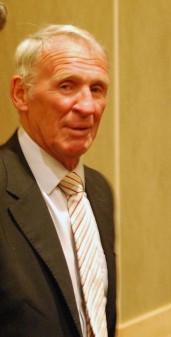
- Crerand in 2011

Personal information
- Full name: Patrick Timothy Crerand
- Date of birth: 19 February 1939 (age 87)
- Place of birth: Glasgow, Scotland
- Position: Right half

Youth career
- 1957–1958: Duntocher Hibs

Senior career*
Years	Team	Apps	(Gls)
1958–1963	Celtic	91	(5)
1963–1971	Manchester United	304	(10)
Total		395	(15)

International career
1960–1962	Scottish Football League XI	7	(1)
1961	SFL trial v SFA	1	(0)
1961–1965	Scotland	16	(0)

Managerial career
- 1972–1976: Manchester United (assistant)
- 1976–1977: Northampton Town
- * Club domestic league appearances and goals

Patrick Timothy Crerand (born 19 February 1939) is a Scottish former footballer who played as a right half. After six years at Celtic, he moved to Manchester United, where he won the English League title twice, the FA Cup, the FA Charity Shield twice and the European Cup. He also gained 16 international caps for Scotland. He is considered one of the best midfielders of his generation, possessing an extraordinary sense of sight and having a particularly prolific partnership with talisman George Best.

Crerand spent one season managing Northampton Town and has since forged a career in the media. He started on radio, and later commentated on matches for MUTV.

== Early and personal life ==
Crerand was born to Irish immigrants in the Gorbals area of Glasgow on 19 February 1939. His father, Michael Crerand, was from Newtownstewart, County Tyrone, and his mother, Sarah Boyle, was from Gweedore, County Donegal, where Crerand spent much of his childhood. His father was killed on 12 March 1941 in a German air raid on John Brown's shipyard in Clydebank, where he was working the fire watch on the night of his death; Crerand was two years old.

Crerand married Noreen Ferry, a Scottish girl of Irish descent, in 1963. They have three children, Patrick, Lorraine and Danny, the latter of whom was also a professional footballer. He also has eight grandchildren: Chelsea, Jade, Scarlett, Nicholas, Eina, Saoirse, Danny and Ursula. A cousin, Charlie Gallagher, also later became a footballer with Celtic. In 2007, he released his autobiography, Never Turn the Other Cheek.

Crerand became involved in Irish politics during the Troubles. He said in his autobiography that he was a friend of John Hume and he had talked to IRA members, including Martin McGuinness, in an effort to resolve the rent strikes of 1975.

== Football career ==
Crerand signed for Celtic, following a spell playing Scottish junior football for Duntocher Hibernian alongside future Australia international Pat Hughes. After six years at Celtic, making 120 appearances and scoring five goals, he signed for Manchester United on 6 February 1963, the fifth anniversary of the Munich air disaster. Crerand made his debut against Blackpool. A hard-tackling right half known for his tenacity, he was also an accurate passer, creating chances for attacking players such as Bobby Charlton and George Best.

If pace was not one of his attributes, pugnacity was: "Where I was brought up, you had to be able to run or fight, and you know about my running," he once told a journalist. His pugilistic skills, as well as accurate passing, were much appreciated by his teammate George Best who was frequently the target for some rough treatment by opponents, especially in European matches. At such times, Best recalled: "I always looked around for Paddy Crerand. He's not a dirty player but he's a case-hardened tough Scottish nut when it comes to a fight."

Crerand helped United to the league championship in 1965 and 1967 and won the 1963 FA Cup final and 1968 European Cup final. He represented the Scotland national side on 16 occasions and the Scottish Football League XI. Crerand was inducted into the Scottish Football Hall of Fame in November 2011.

In 1967, Crerand was involved in an incident which led to a change in the International Laws of Association Football. On 13 May 1967, Stoke City visited Old Trafford to play Manchester United. Crerand had an altercation with Peter Dobing of Stoke, which was dealt with by referee Pat Partridge by holding Crerand close, such that his head was over the referee's shoulder. Unknown to the official, TV cameras picked up Crerand spitting over his shoulder at opponent Tony Allen. Crerand and Dobing were cautioned for their confrontation. Partridge later received a letter from the Football League, asking for his observations on the incident. Partridge was unable to respond with conclusive evidence, but nevertheless the International Board changed the Laws of the Game to put spitting on a par with violent conduct and therefore a dismissible offence.

Crerand retired from playing in 1971, having appeared in 401 games. He became a coach at Manchester United and was assistant manager under Tommy Docherty in December 1972. However, Docherty added Frank Blunstone and Tommy Cavanagh to his coaching team soon after, and Crerand was sidelined. Crerand left Old Trafford in 1976 and was manager of Northampton Town in 1976–77. He covered Manchester United matches on local radio in the 1980s and early 1990s.

== Media career ==
Today, he appears regularly on MUTV, Manchester United's television channel, as a co-commentator on its coverage of all Manchester United first-team and reserve matches, as well as appearing as a pundit on the phone-in show The Paddy Crerand Show, where he receives calls from supporters and discusses all things Manchester United. Crerand had previously summarised United matches for Piccadilly Radio in the 1990s before joining MUTV.

In February 2009, Crerand was part of the Manchester United contingent that visited Malta to commemorate the 50th anniversary of the founding of the Malta Manchester United Supporters' Club, the oldest supporters club in the world. During this visit, MUTV and Crerand provided local fans with the opportunity to form part of the audience for his phone-in show.

In 1995, Crerand supported Eric Cantona during the time of his infamous kung-fu kick on Crystal Palace fan Matthew Simmons and the resulting death of Paul Nixon as a consequence of ill-feeling between the clubs fans. Both before and after this incident, Crerand became known for being a "cheerleader" for the Old Trafford club in the media. Speaking in October 2014, former United captain Roy Keane criticised Crerand and Bryan Robson for being biased towards the club in their media work. Keane cited an incident where Nani had been sent off in a Champions League tie against Real Madrid which Keane believed was a correct decision, but Crerand and Robson had believed was incorrect.

On 10 December 2012, Crerand had a hostile reaction during an interview on BBC Radio 5 Live, where he was asked about Rio Ferdinand being struck by a coin from the home crowd during the previous day's Manchester derby.

In 2019, after 252 episodes on-air, The Paddy Crerand Show came to an end.

== Career statistics ==
=== International appearances ===
National team	Season	Apps	Goals
Scotland	1961	7	0
Scotland	1962	4	0
Scotland	1963	1	0
Scotland	1964	—	
Scotland	1965	4	0
Total		16	0

== Honours ==
Manchester United

- Football League First Division: 1964–65, 1966–67
- FA Cup: 1962–63
- FA Charity Shield: 1965, 1967
- European Cup: 1967–68

Scotland

- British Home Championship: 1961–62

Individual

- Scottish Football Hall of Fame: 2011 inductee

Sporting positions
Preceded by Malcolm Musgrove	Manchester United F.C. assistant manager 1972–1976	Succeeded by Frank Blunstone
