= 1960–61 Manchester United F.C. season =

English football club season

Manchester United
1960–61 season
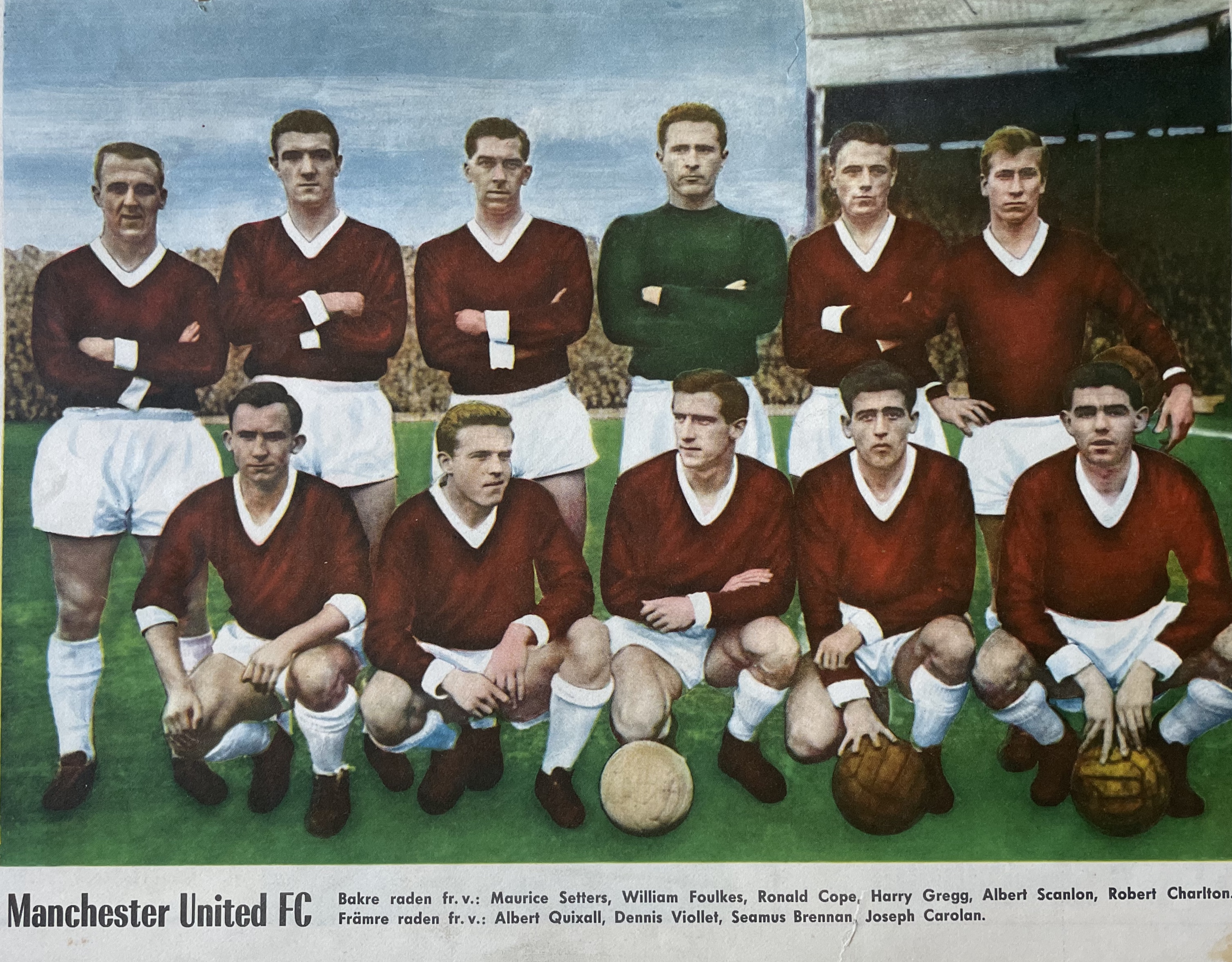
- Manchester United in 1960
- Chairman: Harold Hardman
- Manager: Matt Busby
- First Division: 7th
- FA Cup: Fourth Round
- League Cup: Second Round
- Top goalscorer: League: Bobby Charlton (21); All: Bobby Charlton (21)
- Highest home attendance: 65,295 vs Tottenham Hotspur (16 January 1961)
- Lowest home attendance: 15,662 vs Exeter City (26 October 1960)
- Average home league attendance: 38,501
Home colours	Away colours

The 1960–61 season was Manchester United's 59th season in the Football League, and their 16th consecutive season in the top division of English football. It was also United's first season in the inaugural Football League Cup, and for the second successive season they finished seventh in the league.

== First Division ==
Date	Opponents	H / A	Result F–A	Scorers	Attendance
20 August 1960	Blackburn Rovers	H	1–3	Charlton	47,778
24 August 1960	Everton	A	0–4		51,602
31 August 1960	Everton	H	4–0	Dawson (2), Charlton, Nicholson	51,818
3 September 1960	Tottenham Hotspur	A	1–4	Viollet	55,445
5 September 1960	West Ham United	A	1–2	Quixall	30,506
10 September 1960	Leicester City	H	1–1	Giles	35,493
14 September 1960	West Ham United	H	6–1	Charlton (2), Viollet (2), Quixall, Scanlon	33,695
17 September 1960	Aston Villa	A	1–3	Viollet	43,593
24 September 1960	Wolverhampton Wanderers	H	1–3	Charlton	44,458
1 October 1960	Bolton Wanderers	A	1–1	Giles	39,197
15 October 1960	Burnley	A	3–5	Viollet (3)	32,011
22 October 1960	Newcastle United	H	3–2	Dawson, Setters, Stiles	37,516
24 October 1960	Nottingham Forest	H	2–1	Viollet (2)	23,628
29 October 1960	Arsenal	A	1–2	Quixall	45,715
5 November 1960	Sheffield Wednesday	H	0–0		36,855
12 November 1960	Birmingham City	A	1–3	Charlton	31,549
19 November 1960	West Bromwich Albion	H	3–0	Dawson, Quixall, Viollet	32,756
26 November 1960	Cardiff City	A	0–3		21,122
3 December 1960	Preston North End	H	1–0	Dawson	24,904
10 December 1960	Fulham	A	4–4	Quixall (2), Charlton, Dawson	23,625
17 December 1960	Blackburn Rovers	A	2–1	Pearson (2)	17,285
24 December 1960	Chelsea	A	2–1	Dawson, Charlton	37,601
26 December 1960	Chelsea	H	6–0	Dawson (3), Nicholson (2), Charlton	50,164
31 December 1960	Manchester City	H	5–1	Dawson (3), Charlton (2)	61,213
14 January 1961	Tottenham Hotspur	H	2–0	Pearson, Stiles	65,295
21 January 1961	Leicester City	A	0–6		31,308
4 February 1961	Aston Villa	H	1–1	Charlton	33,525
11 February 1961	Wolverhampton Wanderers	A	1–2	Nicholson	38,526
18 February 1961	Bolton Wanderers	H	3–1	Dawson (2), Quixall	37,558
25 February 1961	Nottingham Forest	A	2–3	Charlton, Quixall	26,850
4 March 1961	Manchester City	A	3–1	Charlton, Dawson, Pearson	50,479
11 March 1961	Newcastle United	A	1–1	Charlton	28,870
18 March 1961	Arsenal	H	1–1	Moir	29,732
25 March 1961	Sheffield Wednesday	A	1–5	Charlton	35,901
31 March 1961	Blackpool	A	0–2		30,835
1 April 1961	Fulham	H	3–1	Charlton, Quixall, Viollet	24,654
3 April 1961	Blackpool	H	2–0	Nicholson, own goal	39,169
8 April 1961	West Bromwich Albion	A	1–1	Pearson	27,750
12 April 1961	Burnley	H	6–0	Quixall (3), Viollet (3)	25,019
15 April 1961	Birmingham City	H	4–1	Pearson (2), Quixall, Viollet	28,376
22 April 1961	Preston North End	A	4–2	Charlton (2), Setters (2)	21,252
29 April 1961	Cardiff City	H	3–3	Charlton (2), Setters	30,320

Pos	Team	Pld	W	D	L	GF	GA	GAv	Pts	Qualification or relegation
5	Everton	42	22	6	14	87	69	1.261	50	
6	Leicester City	42	18	9	15	87	70	1.243	45	Qualification for the European Cup Winners' Cup preliminary round (Note: Leicester City qualified for the Cup Winners' Cup preliminary round as the 1960–61 FA Cup runners-up, since the winners, Tottenham Hotspur, had already qualified for the European Cup.)
7	Manchester United	42	18	9	15	88	76	1.158	45	
8	Aston Villa	42	17	9	16	78	77	1.013	43	
9	Blackburn Rovers	42	15	13	14	77	76	1.013	43	

Source: World Football
Rules for classification: 1) Points; 2) Goal average; 3) Goals scored

== FA Cup ==
Date	Round	Opponents	H / A	Result F–A	Scorers	Attendance
7 January 1961	Round 3	Middlesbrough	H	3–0	Dawson (2), Cantwell	49,184
28 January 1961	Round 4	Sheffield Wednesday	A	1–1	Cantwell	58,000
1 February 1961	Round 4 Replay	Sheffield Wednesday	H	2–7	Dawson, Pearson	65,243

== League Cup ==
Date	Round	Opponents	H / A	Result F–A	Scorers	Attendance
19 October 1960	Round 1	Exeter City	A	1–1	Dawson	14,494
26 October 1960	Round 1 Replay	Exeter City	H	4–1	Quixall (2), Giles, Pearson	15,662
2 November 1960	Round 2	Bradford City	A	1–2	Viollet	4,670

== Squad statistics ==
Pos.	Name	League		FA Cup		League Cup		Total	
Pos.	Name	Apps	Goals	Apps	Goals	Apps	Goals	Apps	Goals
GK	(Northern Ireland) Ronnie Briggs	1	0	2	0	0	0	3	0
GK	(England) David Gaskell	10	0	0	0	1	0	11	0
GK	(Northern Ireland) Harry Gregg	27	0	1	0	2	0	30	0
GK	(England) Mike Pinner	4	0	0	0	0	0	4	0
FB	(England) Harold Bratt	0	0	0	0	1	0	1	0
FB	(Republic of Ireland) Shay Brennan	41	0	3	0	2	0	46	0
FB	(Republic of Ireland) Noel Cantwell	24	0	3	2	0	0	27	2
FB	(Republic of Ireland) Joe Carolan	2	0	0	0	1	0	3	0
FB	(England) Ronnie Cope	6	0	0	0	1	0	7	0
FB	(Republic of Ireland) Tony Dunne	3	0	0	0	1	0	4	0
FB	(Scotland) Tommy Heron	1	0	0	0	0	0	1	0
HB	(England) Bill Foulkes	40	0	3	0	2	0	45	0
HB	(England) Frank Haydock	4	0	0	0	0	0	4	0
HB	(England) Nobby Lawton	1	0	0	0	1	0	2	0
HB	(Northern Ireland) Jimmy Nicholson	31	5	3	0	3	0	37	5
HB	(England) Maurice Setters	40	4	3	0	2	0	45	4
HB	(England) Nobby Stiles	26	2	3	0	2	0	31	2
FW	(England) Warren Bradley	4	0	0	0	0	0	4	0
FW	(England) Bobby Charlton	39	21	3	0	0	0	42	21
FW	(Scotland) Alex Dawson	28	16	3	3	3	1	34	20
FW	(Republic of Ireland) Johnny Giles	23	2	0	0	2	1	25	3
FW	(Scotland) Ian Moir	8	1	0	0	0	0	8	1
FW	(Wales) Kenny Morgans	2	0	0	0	0	0	2	0
FW	(England) Mark Pearson	27	7	3	1	3	1	33	9
FW	(England) Albert Scanlon	8	1	0	0	3	0	11	1
FW	(England) Albert Quixall	38	13	2	0	1	2	41	15
FW	(England) Dennis Viollet	24	15	1	0	2	1	27	16
–	Own goals	–	1	–	0	–	0	–	1
