= 1958–59 Manchester United F.C. season =

English football club season

Manchester United
1958–59 season
- Chairman: Harold Hardman
- Manager: Matt Busby
- First Division: 2nd
- FA Cup: Third Round
- Top goalscorer: League: Bobby Charlton (29); All: Bobby Charlton (29)
- Highest home attendance: 65,187 vs Blackburn Rovers (6 September 1958)
- Lowest home attendance: 38,482 vs Leicester City (6 December 1958)
- Average home league attendance: 53,258
Home colours	Away colours

The 1958–59 season was Manchester United's 57th season in the Football League, and their 14th consecutive season in the top division of English football. It was the first season of a revamped United side which was being rebuilt following the Munich air disaster in the February of the previous season which had claimed the lives of eight players. The most notable addition to the squad for the new season as forward Albert Quixall, a pre-season signing from Sheffield Wednesday.

The season saw the retirement of centre-half Jackie Blanchflower as a result of the injuries he suffered in the Munich crash.

Munich crash survivor Bobby Charlton was United's top scorer this season with 29 league goals, while fellow survivor Albert Scanlon was also impressive with 16 goals from the left wing.

The new look United side finished second in the league this season.

== First Division ==
Date	Opponents	H / A	Result F–A	Scorers	Attendance	League position
23 August 1958	Chelsea	H	5–2	Charlton (3), Dawson (2)	52,382	5th
27 August 1958	Nottingham Forest	A	3–0	Charlton (2), Scanlon	44,971	2nd
30 August 1958	Blackpool	A	1–2	Viollet	26,719	6th
3 September 1958	Nottingham Forest	H	1–1	Charlton	51,880	7th
6 September 1958	Blackburn Rovers	H	6–1	Charlton (2), Viollet (2), Scanlon, Webster	65,187	2nd
8 September 1958	West Ham United	A	2–3	McGuinness, Webster	35,672	5th
13 September 1958	Newcastle United	A	1–1	Charlton	60,670	7th
17 September 1958	West Ham United	H	4–1	Scanlon (3), Webster	53,276	7th
20 September 1958	Tottenham Hotspur	H	2–2	Webster (2)	62,277	4th
27 September 1958	Manchester City	A	1–1	Charlton	62,912	6th
4 October 1958	Wolverhampton Wanderers	A	0–4		36,840	8th
8 October 1958	Preston North End	H	0–2		46,163	8th
11 October 1958	Arsenal	H	1–1	Viollet	56,148	7th
18 October 1958	Everton	A	2–3	Cope (2)	64,079	10th
25 October 1958	West Bromwich Albion	H	1–2	Goodwin	51,721	14th
1 November 1958	Leeds United	A	2–1	Goodwin, Scanlon	48,574	12th
8 November 1958	Burnley	H	1–3	Quixall	48,509	14th
15 November 1958	Bolton Wanderers	A	3–6	Dawson (2), Charlton	33,358	15th
22 November 1958	Luton Town	H	2–1	Charlton, Viollet	42,428	12th
29 November 1958	Birmingham City	A	4–0	Charlton (2), Bradley, Scanlon	28,658	10th
6 December 1958	Leicester City	H	4–1	Charlton, Bradley, Scanlon, Viollet	38,482	9th
13 December 1958	Preston North End	A	4–3	Charlton, Bradley, Scanlon, Viollet	26,290	8th
20 December 1958	Chelsea	A	3–2	Charlton, Goodwin, own goal	48,550	7th
26 December 1958	Aston Villa	H	2–1	Quixall, Viollet	63,098	7th
27 December 1958	Aston Villa	A	2–0	Pearson, Viollet	56,450	4th
3 January 1959	Blackpool	H	3–1	Charlton (2), Viollet	61,961	3rd
31 January 1959	Newcastle United	H	4–4	Charlton, Quixall, Scanlon, Viollet	49,008	4th
7 February 1959	Tottenham Hotspur	A	3–1	Charlton (2), Scanlon	48,401	3rd
16 February 1959	Manchester City	H	4–1	Bradley (2), Goodwin, Scanlon	59,846	3rd
21 February 1959	Wolverhampton Wanderers	H	2–1	Charlton, Viollet	62,794	2nd
28 February 1959	Arsenal	A	2–3	Bradley, Viollet	67,162	3rd
2 March 1959	Blackburn Rovers	A	3–1	Bradley (2), Scanlon	40,401	3rd
7 March 1959	Everton	H	2–1	Goodwin, Scanlon	51,254	2nd
14 March 1959	West Bromwich Albion	A	3–1	Bradley, Scanlon, Viollet	35,463	2nd
21 March 1959	Leeds United	H	4–0	Viollet (3), Charlton	45,473	2nd
27 March 1959	Portsmouth	H	6–1	Charlton (2), Viollet (2), Bradley, own goal	52,004	1st
28 March 1959	Burnley	A	2–4	Goodwin, Viollet	44,577	2nd
30 March 1959	Portsmouth	A	3–1	Charlton (2), Bradley	29,359	1st
4 April 1959	Bolton Wanderers	H	3–0	Charlton, Scanlon, Viollet	61,528	2nd
11 April 1959	Luton Town	A	0–0		27,025	2nd
18 April 1959	Birmingham City	H	1–0	Quixall	43,006	2nd
25 April 1959	Leicester City	A	1–2	Bradley	38,466	2nd

Pos	Team	Pld	W	D	L	GF	GA	GAv	Pts	Qualification or relegation
1	Wolverhampton Wanderers (C)	42	28	5	9	110	49	2.245	61	Qualification for the European Cup preliminary round
2	Manchester United	42	24	7	11	103	66	1.561	55	
3	Arsenal	42	21	8	13	88	68	1.294	50	
4	Bolton Wanderers	42	20	10	12	79	66	1.197	50	
5	West Bromwich Albion	42	18	13	11	88	68	1.294	49	
6	West Ham United	42	21	6	15	85	70	1.214	48	
7	Burnley	42	19	10	13	81	70	1.157	48	
8	Blackpool	42	18	11	13	66	49	1.347	47	
9	Birmingham City	42	20	6	16	84	68	1.235	46	
10	Blackburn Rovers	42	17	10	15	76	70	1.086	44	
11	Newcastle United	42	17	7	18	80	80	1.000	41	
12	Preston North End	42	17	7	18	70	77	0.909	41	
13	Nottingham Forest	42	17	6	19	71	74	0.959	40	
14	Chelsea	42	18	4	20	77	98	0.786	40	
15	Leeds United	42	15	9	18	57	74	0.770	39	
16	Everton	42	17	4	21	71	87	0.816	38	
17	Luton Town	42	12	13	17	68	71	0.958	37	
18	Tottenham Hotspur	42	13	10	19	85	95	0.895	36	
19	Leicester City	42	11	10	21	67	98	0.684	32	
20	Manchester City	42	11	9	22	64	95	0.674	31	
21	Aston Villa (R)	42	11	8	23	58	87	0.667	30	Relegation to the Second Division
22	Portsmouth (R)	42	6	9	27	64	112	0.571	21	Relegation to the Second Division

Source: World Football
Rules for classification: 1) Points; 2) Goal average; 3) Goals scored
(C) Champions; (R) Relegated

== FA Cup ==
Date	Round	Opponents	H / A	Result F–A	Scorers	Attendance
10 January 1959	Round 3	Norwich City	A	0–3		38,000

== Squad statistics ==
Pos.	Name	League		FA Cup		Total	
Pos.	Name	Apps	Goals	Apps	Goals	Apps	Goals
GK	(Northern Ireland) Harry Gregg	41	0	1	0	42	0
GK	(England) Ray Wood	1	0	0	0	1	0
FB	(Republic of Ireland) Joe Carolan	23	0	1	0	24	0
FB	(England) Bill Foulkes	32	0	1	0	33	0
FB	(England) Ian Greaves	34	0	0	0	34	0
HB	(Republic of Ireland) Shay Brennan	1	0	0	0	1	0
HB	(England) Ronnie Cope	32	2	1	0	33	2
HB	(England) Stan Crowther	2	0	0	0	2	0
HB	(England) Freddie Goodwin	42	6	1	0	43	6
HB	(England) Bobby Harrop	5	0	0	0	5	0
HB	(England) Wilf McGuinness	39	1	1	0	40	1
FW	(England) Warren Bradley	24	12	1	0	25	12
FW	(England) Bobby Charlton	38	29	1	0	39	29
FW	(Scotland) Alex Dawson	11	4	0	0	11	4
FW	(Wales) Reg Hunter	1	0	0	0	1	0
FW	(Wales) Kenny Morgans	2	0	0	0	2	0
FW	(England) Mark Pearson	4	1	0	0	4	1
FW	(England) Albert Quixall	33	4	1	0	34	4
FW	(England) Albert Scanlon	42	16	1	0	43	16
FW	(England) Ernie Taylor	11	0	0	0	11	0
FW	(England) Dennis Viollet	37	21	1	0	38	21
FW	(Wales) Colin Webster	7	5	0	0	7	5
–	Own goals	–	2	–	0	–	2
