= 1959–60 Manchester United F.C. season =

English football club season

Manchester United
1959–60 season
- Chairman: Harold Hardman
- Manager: Matt Busby
- First Division: 7th
- FA Cup: Fifth Round
- Top goalscorer: League: Dennis Viollet (32); All: Dennis Viollet (32)
- Highest home attendance: 66,350 vs Sheffield Wednesday (20 February 1960)
- Lowest home attendance: 33,677 vs West Bromwich Albion (19 December 1959)
- Average home league attendance: 48,012
Home colours	Away colours

The 1959–60 season was Manchester United's 58th season in the Football League, and their 15th consecutive season in the top division of English football. They finished seventh in the league, and striker Dennis Viollet scored a record 32 league goals in a season for the club.

== First Division ==
Date	Opponents	H / A	Result F–A	Scorers	Attendance
22 August 1959	West Bromwich Albion	A	2–3	Viollet (2)	40,076
26 August 1959	Chelsea	H	0–1		57,674
29 August 1959	Newcastle United	H	3–2	Viollet (2), Charlton	53,257
2 September 1959	Chelsea	A	6–3	Bradley (2), Viollet (2), Charlton, Quixall	66,579
5 September 1959	Birmingham City	A	1–1	Quixall	38,220
9 September 1959	Leeds United	H	6–0	Bradley (2), Charlton (2), Scanlon, Viollet	48,407
12 September 1959	Tottenham Hotspur	H	1–5	Viollet	55,402
16 September 1959	Leeds United	A	2–2	Charlton, own goal	34,048
19 September 1959	Manchester City	A	0–3		58,300
26 September 1959	Preston North End	A	0–4		35,016
3 October 1959	Leicester City	H	4–1	Viollet (2), Charlton, Quixall	41,637
10 October 1959	Arsenal	H	4–2	Charlton, Quixall, Viollet, own goal	51,626
17 October 1959	Wolverhampton Wanderers	A	2–3	Viollet, own goal	45,451
24 October 1959	Sheffield Wednesday	H	3–1	Viollet (2), Bradley	39,259
31 October 1959	Blackburn Rovers	A	1–1	Quixall	39,621
7 November 1959	Fulham	H	3–3	Charlton, Scanlon, Viollet	44,063
14 November 1959	Bolton Wanderers	A	1–1	Dawson	37,892
21 November 1959	Luton Town	H	4–1	Viollet (2), Goodwin, Quixall	40,572
28 November 1959	Everton	A	1–2	Viollet	46,095
5 December 1959	Blackpool	H	3–1	Viollet (2), Pearson	45,558
12 December 1959	Nottingham Forest	A	5–1	Viollet (3), Dawson, Scanlon	31,666
19 December 1959	West Bromwich Albion	H	2–3	Dawson, Quixall	33,677
26 December 1959	Burnley	H	1–2	Quixall	62,376
28 December 1959	Burnley	A	4–1	Scanlon (2), Viollet (2)	47,253
2 January 1960	Newcastle United	A	3–7	Quixall (2), Dawson	57,200
16 January 1960	Birmingham City	H	2–1	Quixall, Viollet	47,361
23 January 1960	Tottenham Hotspur	A	1–2	Bradley	62,602
6 February 1960	Manchester City	H	0–0		59,450
13 February 1960	Preston North End	H	1–1	Viollet	44,014
24 February 1960	Leicester City	A	1–3	Scanlon	33,191
27 February 1960	Blackpool	A	6–0	Charlton (3), Viollet (2), Scanlon	23,996
5 March 1960	Wolverhampton Wanderers	H	0–2		60,560
19 March 1960	Nottingham Forest	H	3–1	Charlton (2), Dawson	35,269
26 March 1960	Fulham	A	5–0	Viollet (2), Dawson, Giles, Pearson	38,250
30 March 1960	Sheffield Wednesday	A	2–4	Charlton, Viollet	26,821
2 April 1960	Bolton Wanderers	H	2–0	Charlton (2)	45,298
9 April 1960	Luton Town	A	3–2	Dawson (2), Bradley	21,242
15 April 1960	West Ham United	A	1–2	Dawson	34,969
16 April 1960	Blackburn Rovers	H	1–0	Dawson	45,945
18 April 1960	West Ham United	H	5–3	Charlton (2), Dawson (2), Quixall	34,676
23 April 1960	Arsenal	A	2–5	Giles, Pearson	41,057
30 April 1960	Everton	H	5–0	Dawson (3), Bradley, Quixall	43,823

Pos	Team	Pld	W	D	L	GF	GA	GAv	Pts
5	Sheffield Wednesday	42	19	11	12	80	59	1.356	49
6	Bolton Wanderers	42	20	8	14	59	51	1.157	48
7	Manchester United	42	19	7	16	102	80	1.275	45
8	Newcastle United	42	18	8	16	82	78	1.051	44
9	Preston North End	42	16	12	14	79	76	1.039	44

Source: World Football
Rules for classification: 1) Points; 2) Goal average; 3) Goals scored

== FA Cup ==
Date	Round	Opponents	H / A	Result F–A	Scorers	Attendance
9 January 1960	Round 3	Derby County	A	4–2	Goodwin, Charlton, Scanlon, own goal	33,297
30 January 1960	Round 4	Liverpool	A	3–1	Charlton (2), Bradley	56,736
20 February 1960	Round 5	Sheffield Wednesday	H	0–1		66,350

== Squad statistics ==
Pos.	Name	League		FA Cup		Total	
Pos.	Name	Apps	Goals	Apps	Goals	Apps	Goals
GK	(England) David Gaskell	9	0	0	0	9	0
GK	(Northern Ireland) Harry Gregg	33	0	3	0	36	0
FB	(Republic of Ireland) Shay Brennan	29	0	3	0	32	0
FB	(Republic of Ireland) Joe Carolan	41	0	3	0	44	0
FB	(England) Ronnie Cope	40	0	3	0	43	0
FB	(England) Ian Greaves	2	0	0	0	2	0
FB	(Scotland) Tommy Heron	1	0	0	0	1	0
HB	(England) Bill Foulkes	42	0	3	0	45	0
HB	(England) Freddie Goodwin	18	1	1	1	19	2
HB	(England) Nobby Lawton	3	0	0	0	3	0
HB	(England) Wilf McGuinness	19	0	0	0	19	0
HB	(England) Maurice Setters	17	0	2	0	19	0
FW	(England) Warren Bradley	29	8	2	1	31	9
FW	(England) Bobby Charlton	37	18	3	3	40	21
FW	(Scotland) Alex Dawson	22	15	1	0	23	15
FW	(Republic of Ireland) Johnny Giles	10	2	0	0	10	2
FW	(England) Mark Pearson	10	3	0	0	10	3
FW	(England) Albert Quixall	33	13	3	0	36	13
FW	(England) Albert Scanlon	31	7	3	1	34	8
FW	(England) Dennis Viollet	36	32	3	0	39	32
–	Own goals	–	3	–	1	–	4
