= 1957–58 Manchester United F.C. season =

English football club season

Manchester United
1957–58 season
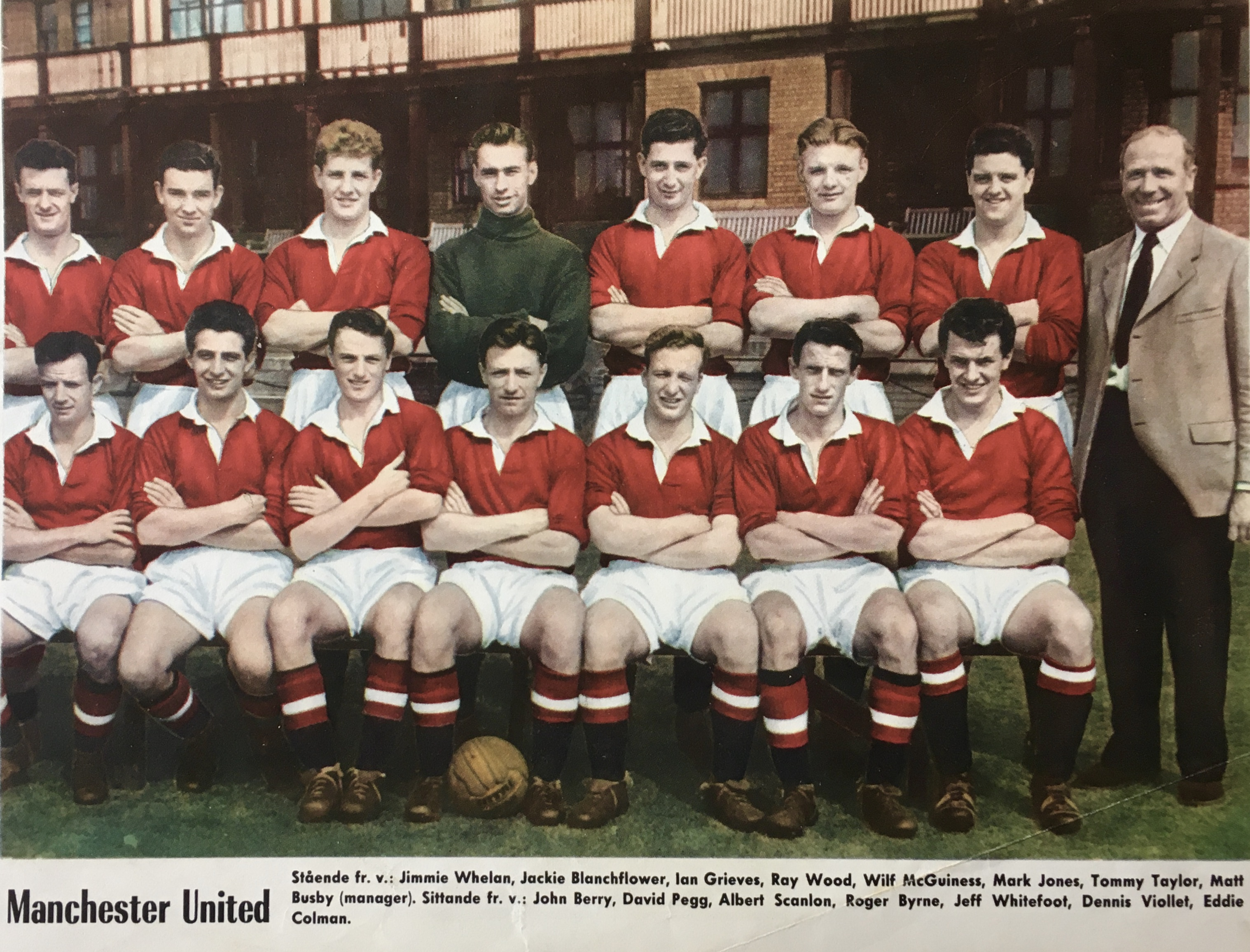
- The Manchester United season squad prior to the Munich air disaster
- Chairman: Harold Hardman
- Manager: Matt Busby (on convalescent leave from 7 February); Jimmy Murphy (acting manager from 7 February)
- First Division: 9th
- FA Cup: Runners-up
- European Cup: Semi-finals
- Charity Shield: Winners
- Top goalscorer: League: Dennis Viollet (16); Tommy Taylor (16); All: Dennis Viollet (23)
- Highest home attendance: 66,124 vs Nottingham Forest (22 February 1958)
- Lowest home attendance: 27,293 vs Aston Villa (22 October 1957)
- Average home league attendance: 46,866
Home colours	Away colours

The 1957–58 season was Manchester United's 56th in the Football League, and their 13th consecutive season in the top division of English football.

The season marked the biggest tragedy in the club's history as eight players, three club officials and ten other passengers died as a result of their injuries in the Munich air disaster on 6 February 1958 on their way back from a European Cup quarter-final away to Red Star Belgrade. Centre-half Mark Jones, captain Roger Byrne, full-back Geoff Bent, winger David Pegg, right-half Eddie Colman, inside-right Bill Whelan and centre-forward Tommy Taylor were all killed instantly. Left-half Duncan Edwards was in hospital for two weeks before he too died on 21 February.

Winger Johnny Berry and centre-half Jackie Blanchflower were both injured to such an extent that they never played again, while several of the surviving players were unavailable for a considerable amount of time as they recovered from their injuries.

Manager Matt Busby was badly injured, and his assistant Jimmy Murphy (who was not on that fateful flight) took charge of the first team until the end of the season as Busby recovered from his injuries. Club secretary Walter Crickmer and coaches Tom Curry and Bert Whalley were all killed in the crash, which claimed a total of 23 lives.

Despite the decimation of their squad, a makeshift United side still managed to reach the FA Cup final that season, where they lost to Bolton Wanderers. They also reached the semi-finals of the European Cup. However, their league form suffered after the crash and their title challenge faded as they finished ninth in the final table.

With the United squad decimated by death and injuries in the aftermath of the Munich tragedy, a number of younger players broke through into the first team. These included winger Shay Brennan and forward Mark Pearson. Another notable new member of the side was goalkeeper Harry Gregg, signed in December 1957 a few weeks before the Munich crash, and who was hailed a hero for his rescue efforts in the crash.

United's top scorer for the season was Dennis Viollet, who found the net 23 times in all competitions and 16 times in the league despite being out of action for some two months as he recovered from injuries sustained in the Munich crash.

== FA Charity Shield ==
Date	Opponents	H / A	Result F–A	Scorers	Attendance
22 October 1957	Aston Villa	H	4–0	T. Taylor (3), Berry	27,293

== First Division ==
Date	Opponents	H / A	Result F–A	Scorers	Attendance
24 August 1957	Leicester City	A	3–0	Whelan (3)	40,214
28 August 1957	Everton	H	3–0	T. Taylor, Viollet, own goal	59,103
31 August 1957	Manchester City	H	4–1	Berry, Edwards, T. Taylor, Viollet	63,347
4 September 1957	Everton	A	3–3	Berry, Viollet, Whelan	72,077
7 September 1957	Leeds United	H	5–0	Berry (2), T. Taylor (2), Viollet	50,842
9 September 1957	Blackpool	A	4–1	Viollet (2), Whelan (2)	34,181
14 September 1957	Bolton Wanderers	A	0–4		48,003
18 September 1957	Blackpool	H	1–2	Edwards	40,763
21 September 1957	Arsenal	H	4–2	Whelan (2), Pegg, T. Taylor	47,142
28 September 1957	Wolverhampton Wanderers	A	1–3	Doherty	48,825
5 October 1957	Aston Villa	H	4–1	T. Taylor (2), Pegg, own goal	43,102
12 October 1957	Nottingham Forest	A	2–1	Viollet, Whelan	47,654
19 October 1957	Portsmouth	H	0–3		38,253
26 October 1957	West Bromwich Albion	A	3–4	T. Taylor (2), Whelan	52,160
2 November 1957	Burnley	H	1–0	T. Taylor	49,449
9 November 1957	Preston North End	A	1–1	Whelan	39,063
16 November 1957	Sheffield Wednesday	H	2–1	Webster (2)	40,366
23 November 1957	Newcastle United	A	2–1	Edwards, T. Taylor	53,890
30 November 1957	Tottenham Hotspur	H	3–4	Pegg (2), Whelan	43,077
7 December 1957	Birmingham City	H	3–3	Viollet (2), T. Taylor	35,791
14 December 1957	Chelsea	H	0–1		36,853
21 December 1957	Leicester City	H	4–0	Viollet (2), Charlton, Scanlon	41,631
25 December 1957	Luton Town	H	3–0	Charlton, Edwards, T. Taylor	39,444
26 December 1957	Luton Town	A	2–2	Scanlon, T. Taylor	26,458
28 December 1957	Manchester City	A	2–2	Charlton, Viollet	70,483
11 January 1958	Leeds United	A	1–1	Viollet	39,401
18 January 1958	Bolton Wanderers	H	7–2	Charlton (3), Viollet (2), Edwards, Scanlon	41,141
1 February 1958	Arsenal	A	5–4	T. Taylor (2), Charlton, Edwards, Viollet	63,578
22 February 1958	Nottingham Forest	H	1–1	Dawson	66,124
8 March 1958	West Bromwich Albion	H	0–4		63,278
15 March 1958	Burnley	A	0–3		37,247
29 March 1958	Sheffield Wednesday	A	0–1		35,608
31 March 1958	Aston Villa	A	2–3	Dawson, Webster	16,631
4 April 1958	Sunderland	H	2–2	Charlton, Dawson	47,421
5 April 1958	Preston North End	H	0–0		47,816
7 April 1958	Sunderland	A	2–1	Webster (2)	51,302
12 April 1958	Tottenham Hotspur	A	0–1		59,836
16 April 1958	Portsmouth	A	3–3	Dawson, E. Taylor, Webster	39,975
19 April 1958	Birmingham City	H	0–2		38,991
21 April 1958	Wolverhampton Wanderers	H	0–4		33,267
23 April 1958	Newcastle United	H	1–1	Dawson	28,393
26 April 1958	Chelsea	A	1–2	E. Taylor	45,011

Pos	Team	Pld	W	D	L	GF	GA	GAv	Pts	Qualification or relegation
7	Blackpool	42	19	6	17	80	67	1.194	44	
8	Luton Town	42	19	6	17	69	63	1.095	44	
9	Manchester United	42	16	11	15	85	75	1.133	43	
10	Nottingham Forest	42	16	10	16	69	63	1.095	42	
11	Chelsea	42	15	12	15	83	79	1.051	42	Qualification for the Inter-Cities Fairs Cup first round

Source: World Football
Rules for classification: 1) Points; 2) Goal average; 3) Goals scored

== FA Cup ==
Date	Round	Opponents	H / A	Result F–A	Scorers	Attendance
4 January 1958	Round 3	Workington	A	3–1	Viollet (3)	21,000
25 January 1958	Round 4	Ipswich Town	H	2–0	Charlton (2)	53,550
19 February 1958	Round 5	Sheffield Wednesday	H	3–0	Brennan (2), Dawson	59,848
1 March 1958	Round 6	West Bromwich Albion	A	2–2	Dawson, E. Taylor	58,250
5 March 1958	Round 6 Replay	West Bromwich Albion	H	1–0	Webster	60,000
22 March 1958	Semi-final	Fulham	N	2–2	Charlton (2)	69,745
26 March 1958	Semi-final; Replay	Fulham	N	5–3	Dawson (3), Brennan, Charlton	38,000
3 May 1958	Final	Bolton Wanderers	N	0–2		100,000

== European Cup ==
Date	Round	Opponents	H / A	Result F–A	Scorers	Attendance
25 September 1957	Preliminary round First leg	Shamrock Rovers	A	6–0	T. Taylor (2), Whelan (2), Berry, Pegg	45,000
2 October 1957	Preliminary round Second leg	Shamrock Rovers	H	3–2	Viollet (2), Pegg	33,754
20 November 1957	First round First leg	Dukla Prague	H	3–0	Pegg, T. Taylor, Webster	60,000
4 December 1957	First round Second leg	Dukla Prague	A	0–1		35,000
14 January 1958	Quarter-final; First leg	Red Star Belgrade	H	2–1	Charlton, Colman	60,000
5 February 1958	Quarter-final; Second leg	Red Star Belgrade	A	3–3	Charlton (2), Viollet	55,000
8 May 1958	Semi-final; First leg	Milan	H	2–1	E. Taylor, Viollet	44,880
14 May 1958	Semi-final; Second leg	Milan	A	0–4		80,000

== Squad statistics ==
Pos.	Name	League		FA Cup		European Cup		Other		Total	
Pos.	Name	Apps	Goals	Apps	Goals	Apps	Goals	Apps	Goals	Apps	Goals
GK	(England) David Gaskell	3	0	0	0	0	0	0	0	3	0
GK	(Northern Ireland) Harry Gregg	19	0	8	0	4	0	1	0	31	0
GK	(England) Ray Wood	20	0	0	0	4	0	1	0	25	0
FB	(Republic of Ireland) Shay Brennan	5	0	2	3	0	0	0	0	7	3
FB	(England) Roger Byrne	26	0	2	0	6	0	1	0	35	0
FB	(England) Bill Foulkes	42	0	8	0	8	0	1	0	59	0
FB	(England) Ian Greaves	12	0	6	0	2	0	0	0	20	0
FB	(England) Bobby Harrop	5	0	1	0	0	0	0	0	6	0
FB	(Scotland) Tommy Heron	1	0	0	0	0	0	0	0	1	0
FB	(England) Peter Jones	1	0	0	0	0	0	0	0	1	0
HB	(Northern Ireland) Jackie Blanchflower	18	0	0	0	2	0	1	0	21	0
HB	(England) Eddie Colman	24	0	2	0	5	1	0	0	31	1
HB	(England) Ronnie Cope	13	0	6	0	2	0	0	0	21	0
HB	(England) Stan Crowther	11	0	5	0	2	0	0	0	18	0
HB	(England) Duncan Edwards	26	6	2	0	5	0	1	0	34	6
HB	(England) Freddie Goodwin	16	0	6	0	3	0	1	0	26	0
HB	(England) Mark Jones	10	0	2	0	4	0	0	0	16	0
HB	(England) Wilf McGuinness	7	0	0	0	1	0	0	0	8	0
FW	(England) Johnny Berry	20	4	0	0	3	1	1	1	24	6
FW	(England) Bobby Charlton	21	8	7	5	2	3	0	0	30	16
FW	(Scotland) Alex Dawson	12	5	6	5	0	0	0	0	18	10
FW	(England) John Doherty	1	1	0	0	0	0	0	0	1	1
FW	(Wales) Kenny Morgans	13	0	2	0	4	0	0	0	19	0
FW	(England) Mark Pearson	8	0	4	0	2	0	0	0	14	0
FW	(England) David Pegg	21	4	0	0	4	3	1	0	26	7
FW	(England) Albert Scanlon	9	3	2	0	3	0	0	0	14	3
FW	(England) Ernie Taylor	11	2	6	1	2	1	0	0	19	4
FW	(England) Tommy Taylor	25	16	2	0	6	3	1	3	34	22
FW	(England) Dennis Viollet	22	16	3	3	6	4	1	0	32	23
FW	(Wales) Colin Webster	20	6	6	1	5	1	0	0	31	8
FW	(Republic of Ireland) Billy Whelan	20	12	0	0	3	2	1	0	24	14

== Munich air disaster ==
On 5 February 1958, United played Red Star Belgrade in Yugoslavia, in the second leg of the European Cup quarter finals. The match ended in a 3–3 draw, but as United had already won the home leg 2–1, they won the tie 5–4 on aggregate and reached the semi-finals for the second year in succession.

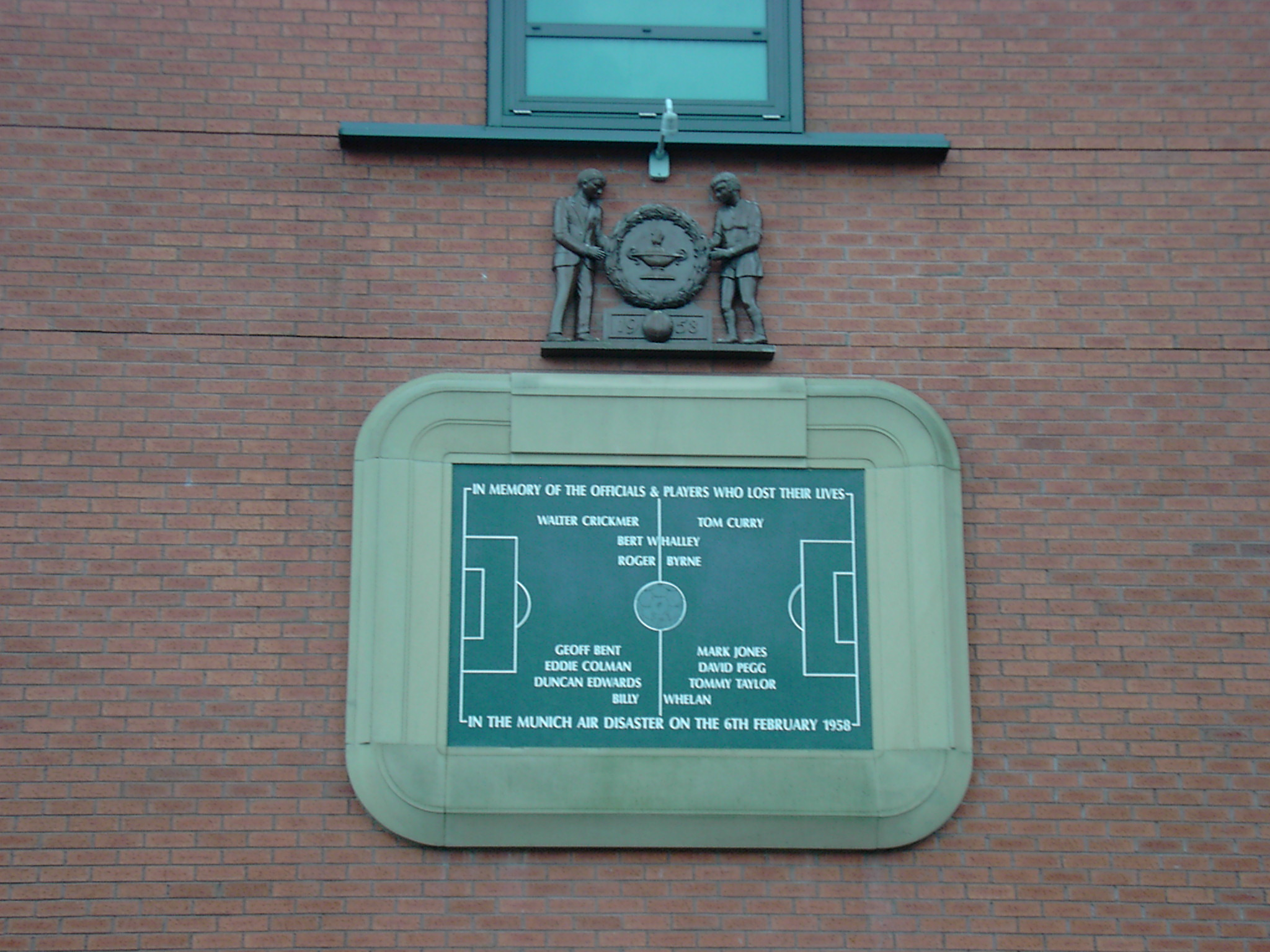
A plaque at Old Trafford in honour of the players who died in the Munich air disaster

The team's chartered plane, an Airspeed Ambassador owned by British European Airways, left Belgrade on 6 February and stopped at Munich to refuel. Takeoff had to be aborted twice because of boost surging, a common problem in the "Elizabethan". The problem was caused by the fuel mixture being too rich, which caused the engines to over-accelerate: this problem was exacerbated by the altitude of the Munich airport.

The pilots were able to control the surging on the third takeoff attempt, but as they reached the V1 "decision speed" (after which it is unsafe to abort takeoff), the airspeed suddenly dropped. The aircraft left the runway, crashed through a fence and into a house. The left wing and the tail were ripped off, while the starboard side of the fuselage hit a fuel tank and exploded. Officially, the cause of the accident was build-up of slush on the runway, which caused the aircraft to lose speed, preventing it from achieving takeoff.

Mark Jones, David Pegg, Roger Byrne (United's captain since 1953), Geoff Bent, Eddie Colman, Liam Whelan, and Tommy Taylor were killed outright, in addition to club secretary Walter Crickmer, and coaches Tom Curry and Bert Whalley. Duncan Edwards, Matt Busby, and Johnny Berry were critically injured; Edwards died fifteen days later. Berry and Jackie Blanchflower survived but never played again. Byrne, Taylor and Edwards were all regular members of the England team, with 70 caps and 21 goals between them, while Pegg, Whelan, Berry and Blanchflower had all received full international recognition for England, the Republic of Ireland or Northern Ireland.

A total of 23 people died as a result of their injuries; among them were four other passengers and two of the crew, as were eight sportswriters including former Manchester City and England goalkeeper Frank Swift. Among the survivors were goalkeeper Harry Gregg, who had only just joined the club from Doncaster Rovers, full-back Bill Foulkes and forward Bobby Charlton.
