= 1956–57 Manchester United F.C. season =

English football club season

Manchester United
1956–57 season
- Chairman: Harold Hardman
- Manager: Matt Busby
- First Division: 1st
- FA Cup: Runners-up
- European Cup: Semi-finals
- Charity Shield: Winners
- Top goalscorer: League: Billy Whelan (26); All: Tommy Taylor (34)
- Highest home attendance: 75,598 vs Borussia Dortmund (17 October 1956)
- Lowest home attendance: 20,357 vs West Bromwich Albion (29 April 1957)
- Average home league attendance: 48,679
Home colours	Away colours	Third colours

The 1956–1957 season was Manchester United's 55th season in the Football League, and their 12th consecutive season in the top division of English football.

United retained their league title this season, which was also notable for being the breakthrough season of forward Bobby Charlton, who made his debut on 6 October 1956 in the league match against Charlton Athletic a few days before his 19th birthday and scored twice, making 17 appearances and scoring 12 goals that season and collecting a league title medal, his appearances mostly coming at the expense of Dennis Viollet. As Old Trafford didn't have floodlights installed at the time, United's first three European home games were played at Maine Road instead. United reached the semi-finals of the European Cup, where they were beaten by eventual winners Real Madrid. They also reached the FA Cup final, where they lost 2–1 to Aston Villa in a game where they were handicapped by an injury to goalkeeper Ray Wood, meaning Jackie Blanchflower had to stand in for him in goal.

== FA Charity Shield ==
Date	Opponents	H / A	Result F–A	Scorers	Attendance
24 October 1956	Manchester City	A	1–0	Viollet	30,495

== First Division ==
Date	Opponents	H / A	Result F–A	Scorers	Attendance
18 August 1956	Birmingham City	H	2–2	Viollet (2)	32,752
20 August 1956	Preston North End	A	3–1	Taylor (2), Whelan	32,569
25 August 1956	West Bromwich Albion	A	3–2	Taylor, Viollet, Whelan	26,387
29 August 1956	Preston North End	H	3–2	Viollet (3)	32,515
1 September 1956	Portsmouth	H	3–0	Berry, Pegg, Viollet	40,369
5 September 1956	Chelsea	A	2–1	Taylor, Whelan	29,082
8 September 1956	Newcastle United	A	1–1	Whelan	50,130
15 September 1956	Sheffield Wednesday	H	4–1	Berry, Taylor, Viollet, Whelan	48,078
22 September 1956	Manchester City	H	2–0	Viollet, Whelan	53,525
29 September 1956	Arsenal	A	2–1	Berry, Whelan	62,479
6 October 1956	Charlton Athletic	H	4–2	Charlton (2), Berry, Whelan	41,439
13 October 1956	Sunderland	A	3–1	Viollet, Whelan, own goal	49,487
20 October 1956	Everton	H	2–5	Charlton, Whelan	43,151
27 October 1956	Blackpool	A	2–2	Taylor (2)	32,632
3 November 1956	Wolverhampton Wanderers	H	3–0	Pegg, Taylor, Whelan	59,835
10 November 1956	Bolton Wanderers	A	0–2		39,922
17 November 1956	Leeds United	H	3–2	Whelan (2), Charlton	51,131
24 November 1956	Tottenham Hotspur	A	2–2	Berry, Colman	57,724
1 December 1956	Luton Town	H	3–1	Edwards, Pegg, Taylor	34,736
8 December 1956	Aston Villa	A	3–1	Taylor (2), Viollet	42,530
15 December 1956	Birmingham City	A	1–3	Whelan	36,146
26 December 1956	Cardiff City	H	3–1	Taylor, Viollet, Whelan	28,607
29 December 1956	Portsmouth	A	3–1	Edwards, Pegg, Viollet	32,147
1 January 1957	Chelsea	H	3–0	Taylor (2), Whelan	42,116
12 January 1957	Newcastle United	H	6–1	Pegg (2), Viollet (2), Whelan (2)	44,911
19 January 1957	Sheffield Wednesday	A	1–2	Taylor	51,068
2 February 1957	Manchester City	A	4–2	Edwards, Taylor, Viollet, Whelan	63,872
9 February 1957	Arsenal	H	6–2	Berry (2), Whelan (2), Edwards, Taylor	60,384
18 February 1957	Charlton Athletic	A	5–1	Charlton (3), Taylor (2)	16,308
23 February 1957	Blackpool	H	0–2		42,602
6 March 1957	Everton	A	2–1	Webster (2)	34,029
9 March 1957	Aston Villa	A	1–1	Charlton	55,484
16 March 1957	Wolverhampton Wanderers	A	1–1	Charlton	53,228
25 March 1957	Bolton Wanderers	H	0–2		60,862
30 March 1957	Leeds United	A	2–1	Berry, Charlton	47,216
6 April 1957	Tottenham Hotspur	H	0–0		60,349
13 April 1957	Luton Town	A	2–0	Taylor (2)	21,227
19 April 1957	Burnley	A	3–1	Whelan (3)	41,321
20 April 1957	Sunderland	H	4–0	Whelan (2), Edwards, Taylor	58,725
22 April 1957	Burnley	H	2–0	Dawson, Webster	41,321
27 April 1957	Cardiff City	A	3–2	Scanlon (2), Dawson	17,708
29 April 1957	West Bromwich Albion	H	1–1	Dawson	20,357

Pos	Team	Pld	W	D	L	GF	GA	GAv	Pts	Qualification or relegation
1	Manchester United (C)	42	28	8	6	103	54	1.907	64	Qualification for the European Cup preliminary round
2	Tottenham Hotspur	42	22	12	8	104	56	1.857	56	
3	Preston North End	42	23	10	9	84	56	1.500	56	
4	Blackpool	42	22	9	11	93	65	1.431	53	
5	Arsenal	42	21	8	13	85	69	1.232	50	

Source: World Football
Rules for classification: 1) Points; 2) Goal average; 3) Goals scored
(C) Champions

== FA Cup ==
Date	Round	Opponents	H / A	Result F–A	Scorers	Attendance
5 January 1957	Round 3	Hartlepool United	A	4–3	Whelan (2), Berry, Taylor	17,264
26 January 1957	Round 4	Wrexham	A	5–0	Taylor (2), Whelan (2), Byrne	34,445
16 February 1957	Round 5	Everton	H	1–0	Edwards	61,803
2 March 1957	Round 6	Bournemouth	A	2–1	Berry (2)	28,799
23 March 1957	Semi-final	Birmingham City	N	2–0	Berry, Charlton	65,107
4 May 1957	Final	Aston Villa	N	1–2	Taylor	100,000

== European Cup ==
Date	Round	Opponents	H / A	Result F–A	Scorers	Attendance
12 September 1956	Preliminary round First leg	Anderlecht	A	2–0	Taylor, Viollet	35,000
26 September 1956	Preliminary round Second leg	Anderlecht	H	10–0	Viollet (4), Taylor (3), Whelan (2), Berry	40,000
17 October 1956	First round First leg	Borussia Dortmund	H	3–2	Viollet (2), Pegg	75,598
21 November 1956	First round Second leg	Borussia Dortmund	A	0–0		44,570
16 January 1957	Quarter-final; First leg	Athletic Bilbao	A	3–5	Taylor, Viollet, Whelan	60,000
6 February 1957	Quarter-final; Second leg	Athletic Bilbao	H	3–0	Berry, Taylor, Viollet	70,000
11 April 1957	Semi-final; First leg	Real Madrid	A	1–3	Taylor	135,000
25 April 1957	Semi-final; Second leg	Real Madrid	H	2–2	Charlton, Taylor	65,000

== Squad statistics ==
Pos.	Name	League		FA Cup		European Cup		Other		Total	
Pos.	Name	Apps	Goals	Apps	Goals	Apps	Goals	Apps	Goals	Apps	Goals
GK	(England) Gordon Clayton	2	0	0	0	0	0	0	0	2	0
GK	(England) Tony Hawksworth	1	0	0	0	0	0	0	0	1	0
GK	(England) Ray Wood	39	0	6	0	8	0	1	0	54	0
FB	(England) Geoff Bent	6	0	0	0	0	0	0	0	6	0
FB	(England) Roger Byrne	36	0	6	1	8	0	1	0	51	1
FB	(England) Bill Foulkes	39	0	6	0	8	0	1	0	54	0
FB	(England) Ian Greaves	3	0	0	0	0	0	0	0	3	0
HB	(Northern Ireland) Jackie Blanchflower	11	0	2	0	3	0	0	0	16	0
HB	(England) Eddie Colman	36	1	6	0	8	0	1	0	51	1
HB	(England) Ronnie Cope	2	0	0	0	0	0	0	0	2	0
HB	(England) Duncan Edwards	34	5	6	1	7	0	1	0	48	6
HB	(England) Freddie Goodwin	6	0	0	0	0	0	0	0	6	0
HB	(England) Mark Jones	29	0	4	0	6	0	1	0	40	0
HB	(England) Wilf McGuinness	13	0	1	0	1	0	0	0	15	0
FW	(England) Johnny Berry	40	8	5	4	8	2	1	0	54	14
FW	(England) Bobby Charlton	14	10	2	1	1	1	0	0	17	12
FW	(Scotland) Alex Dawson	3	3	0	0	0	0	0	0	3	3
FW	(England) John Doherty	3	0	0	0	0	0	0	0	3	0
FW	(England) David Pegg	37	6	6	0	8	1	1	0	52	7
FW	(England) Albert Scanlon	5	2	0	0	0	0	0	0	5	2
FW	(England) Tommy Taylor	32	22	4	4	8	8	1	0	45	34
FW	(England) Dennis Viollet	27	16	5	0	6	9	1	1	39	26
FW	(Wales) Colin Webster	5	3	1	0	0	0	0	0	6	3
FW	(Republic of Ireland) Billy Whelan	39	26	6	4	8	3	1	0	54	33
–	Own goals	–	1	–	0	–	0	–	0	–	1
