= Geoff Bent =

English footballer (1932–1958)

- Bent in 1957

Personal information
- Full name: Geoffrey Bent
- Date of birth: 27 September 1932
- Place of birth: Salford, Lancashire, England
- Date of death: 6 February 1958 (aged 25)
- Place of death: Munich, West Germany
- Height: 5 ft 11 in (1.80 m)
- Position: Left back

Youth career
- 1948–1951: Manchester United

Senior career*
Years	Team	Apps	(Gls)
1951–1958	Manchester United	12	(0)
- * Club domestic league appearances and goals

Geoffrey Bent (27 September 1932 – 6 February 1958) was an English footballer who played as a left back for Manchester United from 1948 until 1958. He was one of the Busby Babes, the young team formed under manager Matt Busby in the mid-1950s. Bent only made twelve first-team appearances for Manchester United, who already had an international-quality left back in Roger Byrne. Modern writers speculate that at most other teams Bent would have been a regular starter, and he was the subject of interest from fellow First Division clubs, but Busby refused to let him leave. He was one of eight Manchester United players who died in the Munich air disaster, when their aircraft crashed on its third attempt to take off from a slush-covered runway at Munich-Riem Airport after a European Cup match in Belgrade.

== Early life ==
Geoffrey Bent was born on 27 September 1932 at Irlams o' th' Height in Salford, Lancashire. He was the only child of Clifford Bent, a surfaceman at Sandhole Colliery, and his wife Clara (née Dunning). He grew up in a matriarchal working-class family; his father was the sole money earner, but his mother ran the household and had more influence on her son. The family lived in a small house in Jackson's Buildings, Salford, at the back of a shop; the only entrance was from a side alley, and the house had no indoor toilet. Bent received his education in Swinton; he first attended St John's Junior School, and then was awarded a scholarship to Tootal Road Grammar School. He was a member of both the Boy Scouts and the Boys' Brigade, and a keen swimmer. In 1946, aged 13, Bent saved another child from drowning in the Manchester and Salford Junction Canal, and was awarded a medal by his local Humane Society.

Although Bent was encouraged to play rugby league by both his father, who supported the local Swinton club, and one of his teachers, he was only ever interested in playing association football. Bent began as a forward, playing at inside left, but later moved into the defence, first as a half back and then left back. He played for Barton Villa in local league football, and in the 1946–47 season, he captained the Salford Schoolboys team to victory in the English Schools Trophy, beating a Leicester team in the final. His performances for Salford drew the attention of several prominent clubs. Bent's mother did not want him to leave home, and she swayed him to sign a contract with Manchester United. At the time, players were not allowed to sign a professional contract with a team until the age of 17, so like many of his teammates, Bent also took on an apprenticeship as a joiner, a trade he continued during the summer breaks between football seasons. After signing for Manchester United, a teenage Bent met Marion Mallandaine, initially when he had been dating her younger sister, Betty. His relationship with Betty did not last very long, and he married Marion on 27 June 1953 in Pendlebury, and the couple later moved into one of the football club's houses on King's Road, not far from the club's home ground of Old Trafford.

== Manchester United career ==
Bent initially joined Manchester United as a trialist in August 1948, then as an amateur alongside his apprenticeship in May 1949. (Note: Despite top-level English football having long been a professional sport primarily played by the working-class, the game was still overseen by predominantly middle-class administrators with traditional values, and amateur and professional status remained in the game until the 1970s. Officially, amateurs could only receive appropriate "expenses" for playing, but could top-up their income with other jobs outside football, such as Bent's joinery apprenticeship.) Over the following few years, he played for United's youth and reserve teams, where he excelled. Manchester United had a nucleus of young, upcoming players, so these teams were often very strong; Bent appeared alongside players such as Bobby Charlton, Wilf McGuinness, David Pegg and Duncan Edwards. In April 1951, aged 18, Bent signed a professional contract with the club.

Bent had been expected to replace John Aston Sr. at left back in the Manchester United first team; Aston was one of the older players in the team and injuries led to his retirement at the end of the 1953–54 season. Bent's teammate Roger Byrne, who had deputised for Aston to make his Manchester United debut in 1951, had made it clear early in the 1952–53 season that he wanted to play at left back, requesting a transfer when the Manchester United manager Matt Busby played him on the left wing instead. Busby relented, and Byrne returned to left back. Byrne became Manchester United captain in February 1954, and it was clear that Bent would not be preferred for the position.

Bent made his first-team debut for Manchester United in December 1954 against Burnley, in place of Byrne, who had a neck injury. He appeared once more that season, when Byrne was on international duty for England in April. Bent's appearances were again sporadic in the 1955–56 season, deputising for either Byrne or Bill Foulkes; he played three times in October, and then once in April. Modern commentators suggest that at almost any other First Division club, Bent would have been a regular member of the first team, and he twice requested a transfer. On both occasions, Busby turned down the request, explaining that he was too valuable for the club to lose. His wife, Marion, believed that several other First Division teams were interested in Bent, including Wolverhampton Wanderers, who along with Manchester United were one of the most successful English clubs of the 1950s. In 1956–57, Bent played six times, each time standing in for either Byrne or Foulkes.

Despite his infrequent first-team appearances, Bent was well thought of, both within the club, as evidenced by Busby's refusal to sell him, and beyond. In an article published in the Manchester Evening News in 1955, Byrne described the positive effect that having strong reserve players such as Bent, who he called a "valuable prospect", had on the team, specifying that; "I for one have really got to strive to keep my position". Foulkes later echoed claims that Bent would have been a first-team regular for most other clubs, and went on to describe him as being "quiet and more studious" than many of his teammates. Wilf McGuinness rated Bent as good enough to play at senior level for England. In his history of the victims of the Munich air disaster, Jeff Connor describes Bent as "tall, well built and a strong tackler", and his biography in The Official Manchester United Illustrated Encyclopedia calls him a "good tackler and accurate passer".

== Munich air disaster ==
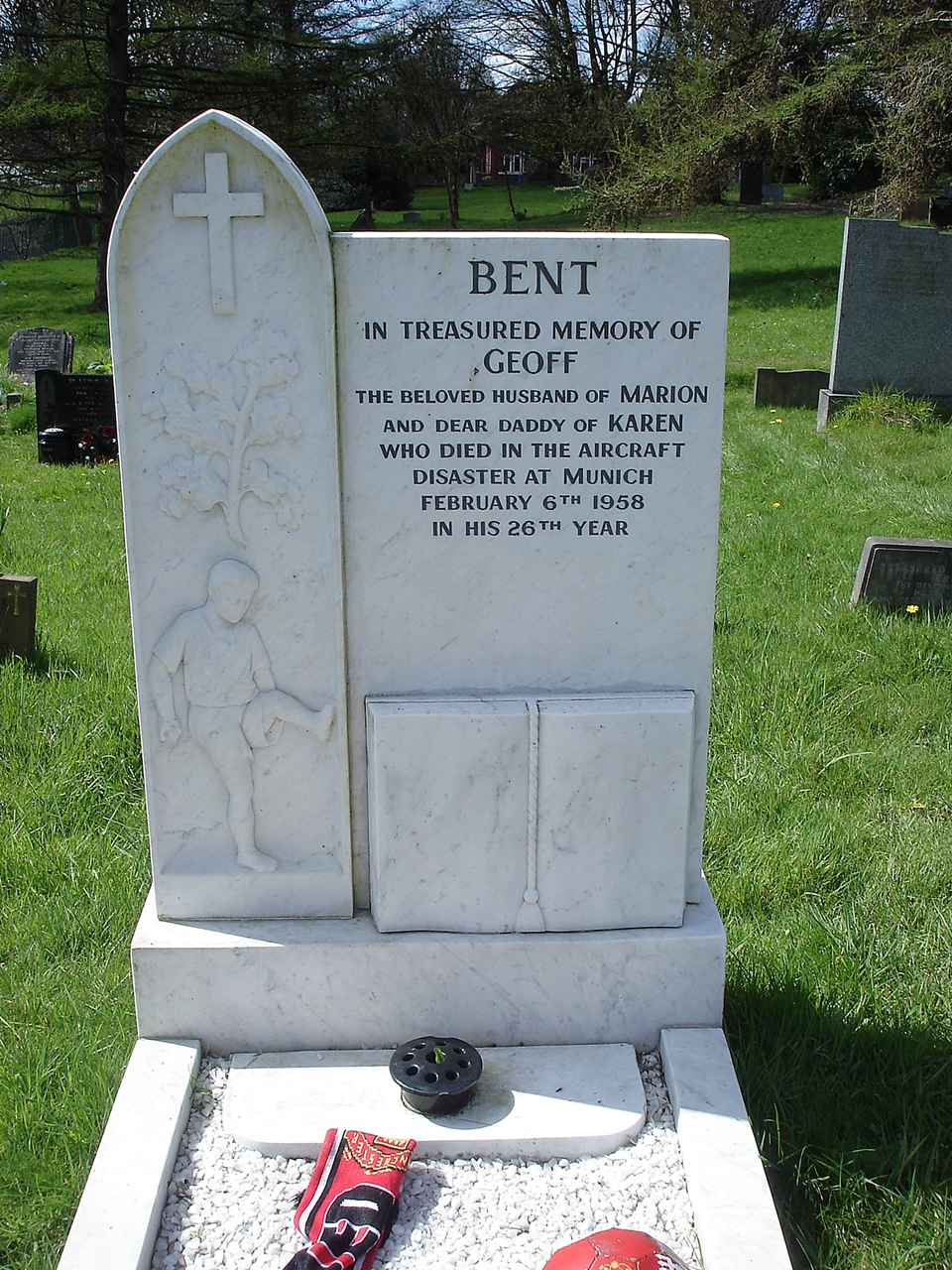
Headstone in St John's churchyard

Bent did not play any first-team games during the 1957–58 season, having been on the sidelines for several months with a broken foot, the second such injury he had suffered during his time with the club. He was on crutches when visiting hospital in September 1957 for the birth of his daughter, Karen.

By February 1958, Bent was fully recovered, and had returned to action for the reserve team. He was not initially included in the travelling party for the second leg of the European Cup quarter-final against Red Star Belgrade. Bent did not enjoy flying, suffering from nose bleeds and requiring ear drops when he did so, and Ronnie Cope was going to travel with the team as a reserve for the experience of a European away fixture. (Note: Substitutes were not yet part of the game, so travelling players not included in the starting team would not feature.) In the days leading up to the trip, Byrne complained of an injury niggle, and so Busby called up Bent for the trip in case Byrne could not play. Bent complained to his wife about the trip, saying: "I don't know why they're taking me, because I'm sure Roger will be fit." Ultimately, Bent was proved right; Byrne recovered and played through the match which United drew 3–3. As they had won the first leg 2–1, United won the two-legged tie and progressed to the semi-finals.

Snow had been falling for most of the game in Belgrade, but the weather was better for the team's flight home the next morning, 6 February. As the aircraft approached Munich-Riem Airport, the snow worsened once more. The plane landed safely, and the players disembarked while the plane was refuelled. A short time later, with the passengers back on board, the plane made two aborted attempts to take off, each time suffering from apparent engine problems. The passengers were asked to disembark again while the pilots discussed the issue with the ground crew, and fifteen minutes later they were ready to try again. On the third attempt, the plane reached 117 knots (217 km/h; 135 mph), the plane's takeoff decision speed, the speed above which take off can no longer safely be aborted, but then hit slush on the runway, and dropped speed. The plane failed to take off, and crashed off the end of the runway, through the barrier fencing, and across a road. Different parts of the plane hit a tree, a house and a wooden hut which exploded. Bent was one of 21 people who died at the scene —a death toll which included eight journalists and seven Manchester United players. Two more died from their injuries over the following few weeks, taking the total number of fatalities to twenty-three. Bent's funeral and interment were held on 13 February at St John's Church in Pendlebury.

== Legacy ==
Although he was not a regular starter, Bent was considered to be one of the Busby Babes, the young team formed at Manchester United under manager Matt Busby in the 1950s which won the First Division in both the 1955–56 and 1956–57 seasons. Bent's name, along with the others who died in Munich, appears on a memorial plaque at Old Trafford, and there is also a memorial stone in Munich, near the site of the crash. The neglected state of his grave has been a regular press story; in 1988 the Manchester Evening News ran a story, in which Bent's widow said she could not afford to maintain the grave. Similar stories appeared in 2005 and 2015; in each instance Manchester United said they would look to provide regular maintenance.

== Career statistics ==
Appearances and goals by club, season and competition
Club	Season	League			FA Cup		Europe		Other		Total	
Club	Season	Division	Apps	Goals	Apps	Goals	Apps	Goals	Apps	Goals	Apps	Goals
Manchester United	1954–55	First Division	2	0	0	0	—		—		2	0
Manchester United	1955–56	First Division	4	0	0	0	—		—		4	0
Manchester United	1956–57	First Division	6	0	0	0	0	0	0	0	6	0
Career total			12	0	0	0	0	0	0	0	12	0

== Notes, citations and sources ==
=== Sources ===
==== Books ====
- Connor, Jeff (2007). The Lost Babes. London: HarperSport. ISBN 978-0-00-720808-1.
- Connor, Jeff (2020). Busby's Last Crusade. From Munich to Wembley: A Pictorial History. Edinburgh: Birlinn. ISBN 978-1-909715-89-9.
- Cox, Richard; Russell, Dave; Vamplew, Wray (2002). Encyclopedia of British Football. London; Portland, Oregon: Frank Cass. ISBN 9780714652498 – via Google Books.
- Hall, David (2009). Manchester's Finest, How the Munich Air Disaster Broke the Heart of a Great City. London: Transworld Publishers. ISBN 9781407033433 – via Google Books.
- Morrin, Stephen (2007). The Munich Air Disaster – The True Story Behind the Fatal 1958 Crash. Dublin: Gill Books. ISBN 978-0-7146-5249-8 – via Google Books.
- Porter, Dilwyn (2000). "Amateur Football in England, 1948–63: The Pegasus Phenomenon". In Smith, Adrian; Dilwyn, Dilwyn (eds.). Amateurs and Professionals in Post-War British Sport. London; Portland, Oregon: Frank Cass. pp. 1–30. ISBN 0-7146-5086-2 – via Google Books.
- Roberts, John (2012). The Team That Wouldn't Die: The Story of the Busby Babes (Kindle ebook). London: Aurum Press. ISBN 978-1-84513-858-5.
- Somerscales, Jillian; Murrell, Deborah; Pritchard, Louise, eds. (1998). The Official Manchester United Illustrated Encyclopedia. London: Manchester United Books. ISBN 0-233-99155-7.

==== Newspapers ====
- "United pick new boy: Revie back". Manchester Evening News. 10 December 1954. p. 8 – via Newspapers.com.
- "Deaths; Bent". Manchester Evening News. 10 February 1958. p. 7 – via Newspapers.com.
- Jackson, Tom (2 April 1955). "A 'bonus' bid by United". Manchester Evening News. p. 8 – via Newspapers.com.
- Trickett, John (1 October 1955). "Taylor soon stems the Luton tide". Manchester Evening News. p. 6 – via Newspapers.com.
- Thornton, Eric (4 October 1955). "United test Charlton under Bury lights". Manchester Evening News. p. 12 – via Newspapers.com.
- Jackson, Tom (21 October 1955). "Edwards, Viollet back in United side". Manchester Evening News. p. 20 – via Newspapers.com.
- Jackson, Tom (24 October 1955). "Wood fit again: Berry doubt". Manchester Evening News. p. 12 – via Newspapers.com.
- Byrne, Roger (1 November 1955). "United the tops—but no first team man sure of a place". Manchester Evening News. p. 8 – via Newspapers.com.
- Joy, Bernard (31 August 1957). "Why players miss 'golden' chances". London Evening Standard. p. 10 – via Newspapers.com.
- Foulkes, Bill (5 February 1968). "My pals who died at Munich". Reading Evening Post. p. 8 – via Newspapers.com.
- Mulchrone, Patrick (4 February 1988). "Shame of a Babe's memory". Manchester Evening News. p. 3 – via Newspapers.com.
- "Forgotten grave of a Busby Babe". Manchester Evening News. 22 June 2005.
- Keeling, Neal (2 September 2015). "Criminals clean up neglected grave of Busby Babe Geoff Bent killed in Munich Air Disaster". Manchester Evening News.

==== Online ====
- Crick, Michael (2017). "Busby Babes". Oxford Dictionary of National Biography (online ed.). Oxford University Press. doi:10.1093/ref:odnb/70631. (Subscription, Wikipedia Library access or UK public library membership required.)
- Ganley, Joe (8 February 2023). "The Story of the Manchester Munich Memorial Foundation". Manchester United. Archived from the original on 3 April 2023.
- "Geoff Bent". Manchester United. Archived from the original on 1 April 2023.
- "The Munich air disaster: a timeline". BBC. 24 September 2014. Archived from the original on 23 May 2023.
