= Dennis Viollet =

English footballer (1933–1999)

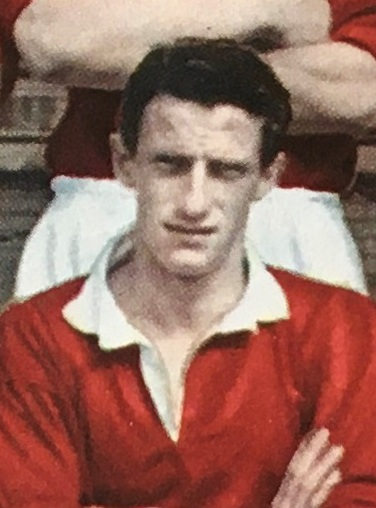
- Viollet in 1957

Personal information
- Full name: Dennis Sydney Viollet
- Date of birth: 20 September 1933
- Place of birth: Fallowfield, Manchester, Lancashire, England
- Date of death: 6 March 1999 (aged 65)
- Place of death: Jacksonville, Florida, United States
- Height: 1.75 m (5 ft 9 in)
- Position: Inside forward

Youth career
- 1949–1953: Manchester United

Senior career*
Years	Team	Apps	(Gls)
1953–1962	Manchester United	259	(159)
1962–1967	Stoke City	182	(59)
1967–1968	Baltimore Bays	34	(7)
1969	Witton Albion	8	(2)
1969–1970	Linfield	11	(5)
Total		494	(232)

International career
1960–1961	England	2	(1)

Managerial career
- 1971: Crewe Alexandra
- 1974–1977: Washington Diplomats
- 1978–1980: New England Tea Men (assistant)
- 1980–1982: Jacksonville Tea Men (assistant)
- 1983–1984: Jacksonville Tea Men
- 1990–1995: Jacksonville Dolphins
- 1995–1996: Richmond Kickers
- 1997–1999: Jacksonville Cyclones
- * Club domestic league appearances and goals

Dennis Sydney Viollet (20 September 1933 – 6 March 1999) was an English footballer who played for Manchester United and Stoke City as well as the England national team. He was famous as one of the Busby Babes and survived the Munich air disaster. After his retirement as a player, he became a coach and spent most of his managerial career in the United States for various professional and school teams.

== Club career ==
=== Manchester United ===
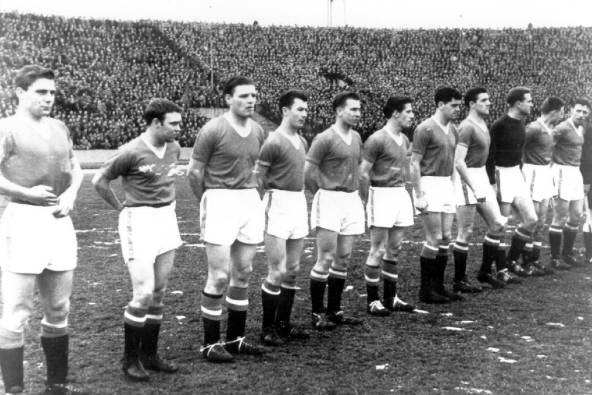
Viollet (sixth from the left) lines up for the Busby Babes' final match in February 1958.

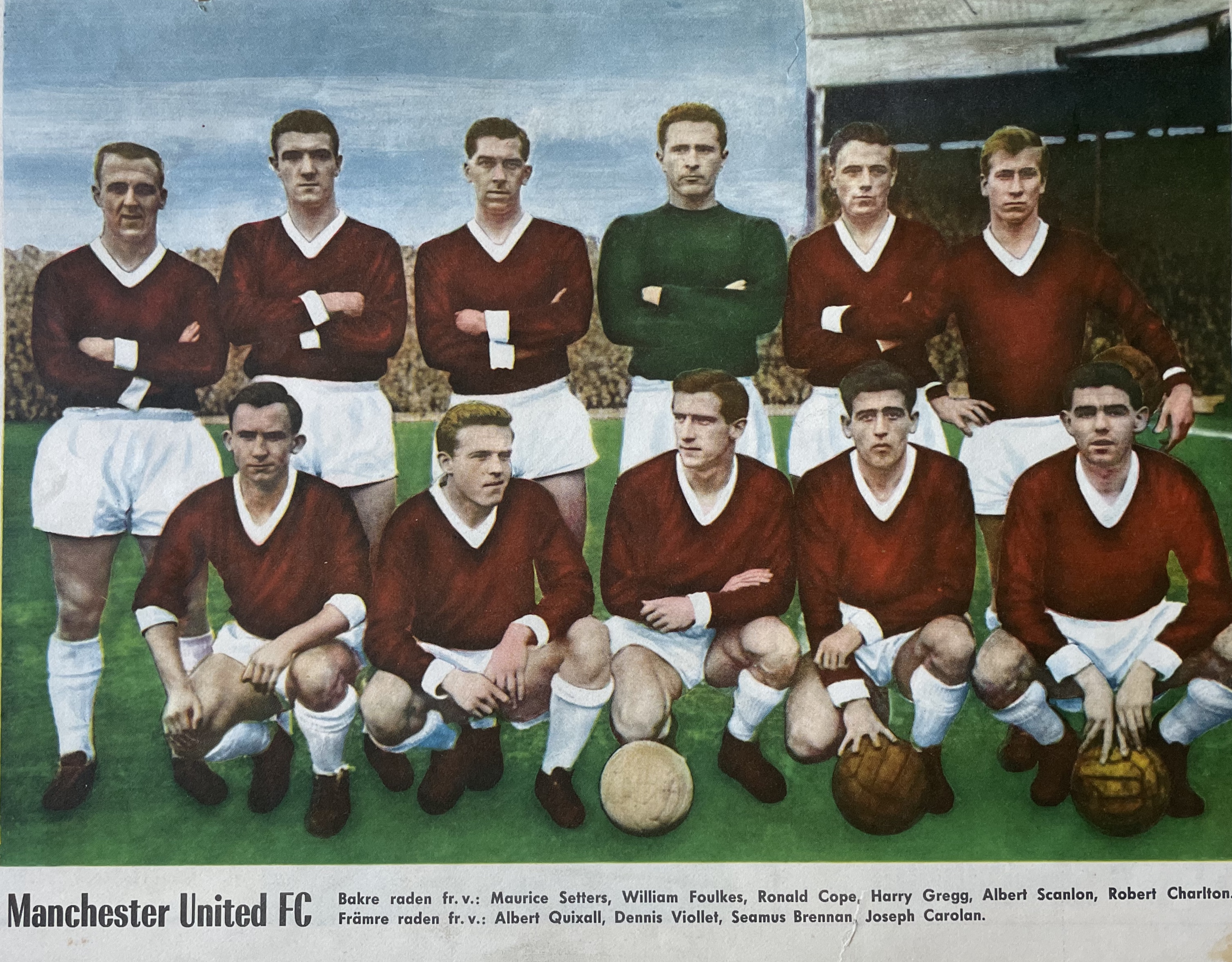
Manchester United F.C. in 1960 – from the left, standing: Maurice Setters, Bill Foulkes, Ronnie Cope, Harry Gregg, Albert Scanlon, Bobby Charlton. Front row: Warren Bradley, Albert Quixall, Dennis Viollet, Shay Brennan and Joe Carolan.

Viollet joined Manchester United on 1 September 1949. He came through the junior ranks at United and turned professional in 1950. His first competitive game for the first team came against Newcastle United on 11 April 1953 and he was a key part of the United teams that won back to back First Division titles in 1956 and 1957. One of his most notable games came on 26 September 1956, in the second leg of United's European Cup preliminary round tie against Belgian champions Anderlecht, in which he scored four goals in a 10–0 win that remains United's biggest competitive victory. In February 1958, Viollet was flying back from a European Cup match in Belgrade via Munich; attempting to take off in bad weather, the plane crashed, killing 21 people, including seven Manchester United players, in what would become known as the Munich air disaster. Viollet survived, suffering only injuries to his head and face, and he returned to action before the end of the season, less than three months later. He played in the 1958 FA Cup Final against Bolton Wanderers, which United lost 2–0, and less than a week later, he scored the equalising goal in a 2–1 win over Milan in the first leg of their European Cup semi-final; Milan won the second leg 4–0 to deny United a place in the final.

After scoring 21 goals in 37 league appearances in 1958–59, Viollet had his most prolific season to date in 1959–60, scoring 32 goals in 36 league appearances, a club record. In recognition of his scoring exploits, Viollet received his first call-up to the England team in May 1960; after being left out for a 3–3 home draw with Yugoslavia and a 3–0 away defeat to Spain on 15 May, he was named at inside left for a 2–0 away defeat to Hungary a week later. Despite missing three months of the 1960–61 season, he still scored 15 goals, behind only Bobby Charlton and Alex Dawson as Manchester United's top scorer, and in September 1961, he was called up to the England squad again for a 1962 World Cup qualifier at home to Luxembourg; Viollet scored England's second goal in a 4–1 win. In January 1962, Matt Busby surprisingly sold the 28-year-old Viollet to Stoke City for £25,000 after scoring 179 goals in 293 appearances for United.

=== Stoke City ===
He joined a team being re-built by Tony Waddington, containing experienced players such as Stanley Matthews, and Jackie Mudie and also emerging talent such as John Ritchie and Eric Skeels. His signing was viewed as a coup for Stoke as at 28 Viollet was still in his prime. He made a decent start to his Stoke career scoring five goals towards the end of the 1961–62 season meaning that hopes were high for 1962–63. While six games without a win heralded another poor start for Stoke, Viollet kick-started Stoke's season with four goals against Charlton Athletic on 12 September. That win gave Stoke the impetus to embark on an unbeaten run of 18, ended by Leeds United on 15 December. The winter of 1962–63 saw no matches played for two months and once football resumed in March Stoke lost once in their next 13 matches and won the Second Division title with Viollet scoring 23 goals. With Stoke back in the First Division after a ten-year absence Waddington decided to move Viollet into midfield. He played and scored in the 1964 Football League Cup Final as Stoke lost 4–3 to Leicester City. He continued to play for Stoke until the summer of 1967 when he announced his retirement after scoring 66 goals in 207 matches for the "Potters". Shortly after his death in March 1999 he was honoured by the club having a street near the Britannia Stadium named 'Dennis Viollet Avenue'.

=== Later career ===
Shortly after leaving the Victoria Ground, he came out of retirement to join NASL team Baltimore Bays in the United States for a season. On returning to Britain, he played for non-league Witton Albion, before finishing his career at Linfield helping them to win the Irish cup in 1970. Once his playing career finished, he had spells coaching at Preston North End, and Crewe Alexandra briefly in 1971.

== International career ==
On 22 May 1960, at the end of his record-breaking season with Manchester United, Viollet won his first full England cap in a 2–0 friendly defeat to Hungary in Budapest. His second and final appearance came on 28 September 1961, in a qualifying game for the 1962 World Cup at Highbury, in which he scored in a 4–1 win over Luxembourg.

== Coaching career in the United States ==
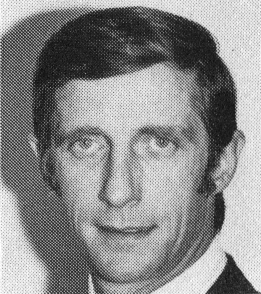
Viollet in 1975

In 1974, Dennis Viollet became the first head coach of the Washington Diplomats of the North American Soccer League. The team did not achieve a great deal of on-field success during his three-year tenure as the coach, only reaching postseason play once (1977) where they were eliminated in the first round. After being replaced in Washington, Viollett accepted the invitation of his former United teammate, Noel Cantwell, to serve as his assistant with the expansion New England Tea Men. After three seasons in the Boston area, the team relocated to Jacksonville, Florida, where Viollet continued on the coaching staff for the now Jacksonville Tea Men. Before the 1983 season, the financially struggling club was sold to an owner whose plan to turn around their budget woes included moving down to the second division American Soccer League, and Cantwell decided to move on. Viollet assumed head coaching duties for the ASL version of the Tea Men and led that squad to the 1983 ASL title, bringing the city of Jacksonville its first ever professional sports championship. He stayed on for one more year as the team moved to the ASL's successor, the United Soccer League, but the Tea Men were still losing money and folded after the 1984 season. In 1985, Viollett became the coach of the varsity boys soccer team at St. Johns Country Day School located in Orange Park, Florida. He also coached the Jacksonville Knights, a professional indoor soccer team, in 1989. In 1990, Viollet took the reins of the Jacksonville University Dolphins, where he stayed until 1995. Jacksonville University and their primary rivals, the University of North Florida, compete annually for the Dennis Viollet Cup. He then took the USISL Richmond Kickers to the 1995 American Double (USISL Premier League and US Open Cup titles). He stayed with Richmond for 2 seasons, then served as coach of the A-League Jacksonville Cyclones before his death from cancer on 6 March 1999, aged 65, in his adopted home of Jacksonville.

In additional to his professional coaching career, Dennis Viollet made important volunteer contributions to youth soccer development in the Orange Park community near Jacksonville. He became an influential member of Orange Park Soccer Club in the early 1980s, helping to organize the club and volunteering to coach a number of youth teams. Over the years that club grew to become Clay County Soccer Club, and in recognition of Dennis' contributions in its early days they honored him by naming their primary soccer field complex after him (Dennis Viollet Soccer Complex) in Orange Park, Florida. Dennis also ran youth soccer camps every summer in Orange Park at St. Johns Country Day School, where he would invite players from teams he managed, such as the Tea Men or Jacksonville University, to act as instructors. Dennis coached and mentored numerous local youth players who later succeeded at various college and professional levels.

== Personal life ==
Viollet was born in Fallowfield, Manchester, in September 1933, the youngest of three children born to Charles Sydney Viollet (1890–1961) and Hannah Tomlinson (1893–1992); he had two older sisters, Vera (born 1917) and Audrey (born 1930). He grew up as a Manchester City supporter.

He married Barbara Mavis Southern at St Edmund's Church, Manchester, in 1951, when he was 17 years old. Their daughter Stephanie was born later that year, and they later had two sons, Roger (born 1957) and Malcolm (born 1961), and another daughter, Deborah (born 1958). They divorced in 1969, and in June that year, Viollet married Helen B. Greeph; they were married until his death nearly 30 years later. Their daughter Rachel (born 1972) became the British number one ranked tennis player when she reached the second round of Wimbledon in 1996. During her tennis career, she won one ITF singles tournament and one ITF doubles tournament.

Viollet died in March 1999 after a two-year battle against cancer, with a brain tumour first being diagnosed during 1997, despite treatment and surgery during that time to combat the illness.

In 2010, Viollet was inducted into the Washington, D.C. Soccer Hall of Fame. Viollet was also inducted into the first class of the United Soccer League Hall of Fame in 2002. The annual University of North Florida/Jacksonville University soccer match has been contested for the Viollet Cup since 2001. The Dennis Viollet Soccer Training Center was dedicated in 2006 and located at the Complete Soccer Academy in Longwood, Florida.

== Career statistics ==
=== Club ===
Appearances and goals by club, season and competition
Club	Season	League			FA Cup		League Cup		Europe		Other		Total	
Club	Season	Division	Apps	Goals	Apps	Goals	Apps	Goals	Apps	Goals	Apps	Goals	Apps	Goals
Manchester United	1952–53	First Division	3	1	0	0	—		—		0	0	3	1
Manchester United	1953–54	First Division	29	11	1	1	—		—		—		30	12
Manchester United	1954–55	First Division	34	20	3	1	—		—		—		37	21
Manchester United	1955–56	First Division	34	20	1	0	—		—		—		35	20
Manchester United	1956–57	First Division	27	16	5	0	—		6 (Note: Appearances in European Cup)	9	1 (Note: Appearances in FA Charity Shield)	1	39	26
Manchester United	1957–58	First Division	22	16	3	3	—		6	4	1	0	32	23
Manchester United	1958–59	First Division	37	21	1	0	—		—		—		38	21
Manchester United	1959–60	First Division	36	32	3	0	—		—		—		39	32
Manchester United	1960–61	First Division	24	15	1	0	2	1	—		—		27	16
Manchester United	1961–62	First Division	13	7	0	0	—		—		—		13	7
Manchester United	Total		259	159	18	5	2	1	12	13	2	1	293	179
Stoke City	1961–62	Second Division	13	5	0	0	0	0	—		—		13	5
Stoke City	1962–63	Second Division	37	23	1	0	1	0	—		—		39	23
Stoke City	1963–64	First Division	32	10	3	2	6	1	—		—		41	13
Stoke City	1964–65	First Division	34	13	3	2	3	1	—		—		40	16
Stoke City	1965–66	First Division	32	6	1	0	5	1	—		—		38	7
Stoke City	1966–67	First Division	34	2	1	0	1	0	—		—		36	2
Stoke City	Total		182	59	9	4	16	3	—		—		207	66
Baltimore Bays	1967	NPSL	12	4	—		—		—		—		12	4
Baltimore Bays	1968	NASL	22	3	—		—		—		—		22	3
Baltimore Bays	Total		34	7	—		—		—		—		34	7
Career total			475	225	27	9	18	4	12	13	2	1	534	252

=== International ===
Appearances and goals by national team and year
National team	Year	Apps	Goals
England	1960	1	0
England	1961	1	1
Total		2	1

== Managerial statistics ==
Team	From	To	Record				
Team	From	To	G	W	D	L	Win %
Crewe Alexandra	1 August 1971	1 November 1971	15	4	2	9	26.67

== Honours ==
Manchester United

- Football League First Division: 1955–56, 1956–57
- FA Charity Shield: 1956, 1957
- FA Cup runner-up: 1957–58

Stoke City

- Football League Second Division: 1962–63
- Football League Cup runner-up: 1963–64

Linfield

- Irish Cup: 1969–70

Individual

- European Cup Top Scorer: 1956–57
- Football League First Division Top Scorer: 1959–60

Sporting positions
Preceded by Bill Foulkes	Manchester United captain 1959–1960	Succeeded by Maurice Setters
