= Joe Carolan =

Irish footballer (1937–2018)

Personal information
- Full name: Joseph Francis Carolan
- Date of birth: 8 September 1937
- Place of birth: Dublin, Ireland
- Date of death: 26 September 2018 (aged 81)
- Position: Left-back

Youth career
- 1955–1956: Home Farm

Senior career*
Years	Team	Apps	(Gls)
1956–1960	Manchester United	66	(0)
1960–1962	Brighton & Hove Albion	33	(0)
1962–1968	Tonbridge	424	(50)
1968–1971	Canterbury City		

International career
1959–1960	Republic of Ireland	2	(0)
- * Club domestic league appearances and goals

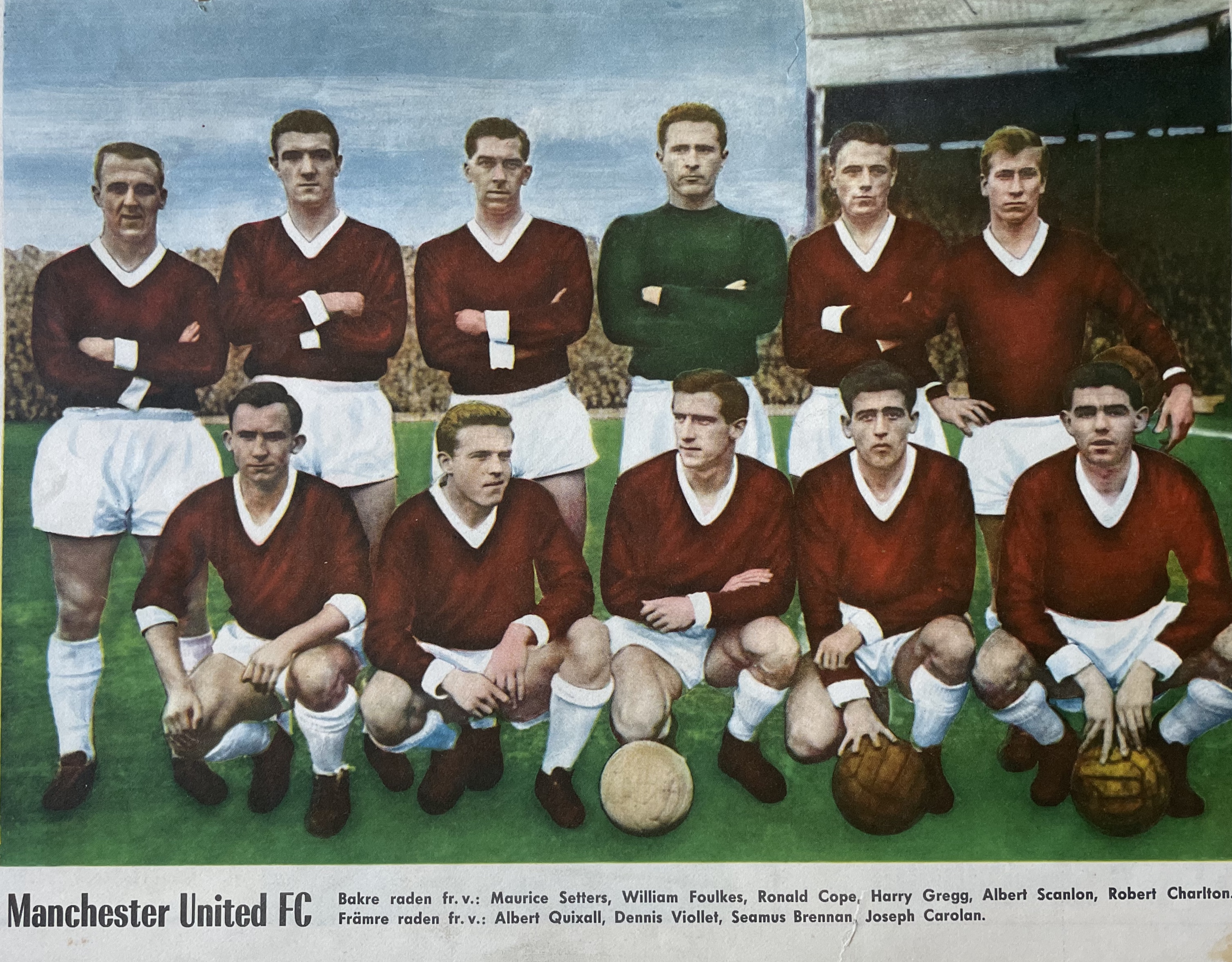
Manchester United F.C. in 1960 – from the left, standing: Maurice Setters, Bill Foulkes, Ronnie Cope, Harry Gregg, Albert Scanlon, Bobby Charlton. Front row: Warren Bradley, Albert Quixall, Dennis Viollet, Shay Brennan and Joe Carolan.

Joseph Carolan (8 September 1937 – 26 September 2018) was an Irish professional footballer who played as a full-back in the Football League for Manchester United and Brighton & Hove Albion.

Born in Dublin, Carolan started his career with Home Farm at youth level before moving to Manchester United on 15 February 1956, where he featured in their FA Youth Cup winning team. On 22 November 1958, Carolan made his senior debut against Luton Town. He broke into the first team nine months after the Munich air disaster, which had claimed the lives of eight United players - including his fellow countryman Billy Whelan - and resulted in two other players being injured to such an extent that they never played again.

He played 71 times for United between 1958 and 1960 and won two caps for the Republic of Ireland making his debut on the 1 November 1959.

Carolan joined Brighton and Hove Albion in December 1960. He joined Tonbridge in 1962 before signing for Canterbury City in 1968.

He died in September 2018.
