= Shay Brennan =

Irish footballer (1937–2000)

Personal information
- Full name: Seamus Anthony Brennan
- Date of birth: 6 May 1937
- Place of birth: Manchester, England
- Date of death: 9 June 2000 (aged 63)
- Place of death: Tramore, Ireland
- Position: Full-back

Youth career
- 1953–1957: Manchester United

Senior career*
Years	Team	Apps	(Gls)
1957–1970	Manchester United	355	(6)
1970–1974	Waterford	40	(0)
Total		395	(6)

International career
1965–1970	Republic of Ireland	19	(0)
1970	League of Ireland XI	1	(0)
- * Club domestic league appearances and goals

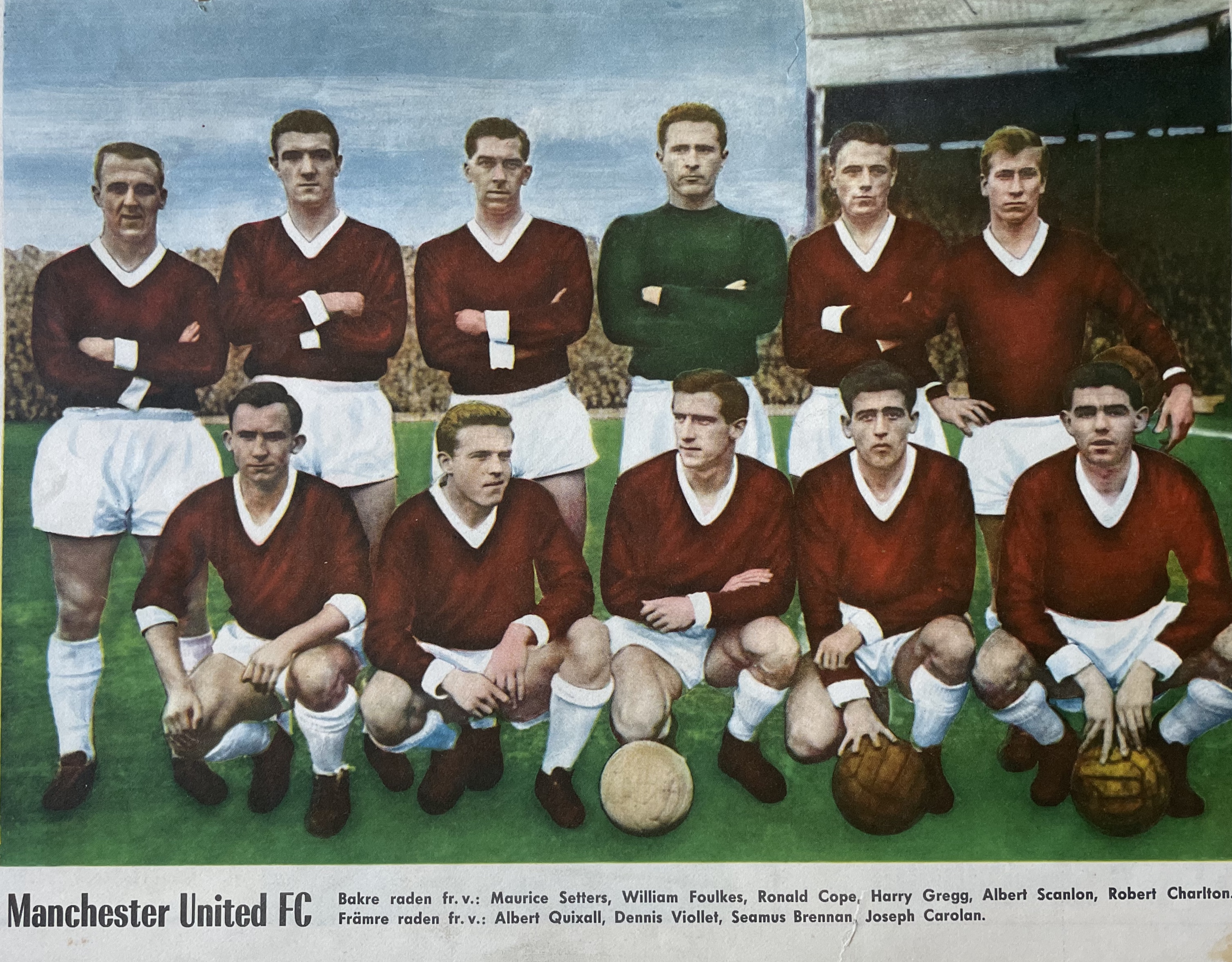
Manchester United F.C. in 1960 – from the left, standing: Maurice Setters, Bill Foulkes, Ronnie Cope, Harry Gregg, Albert Scanlon, Bobby Charlton. Front row: Warren Bradley, Albert Quixall, Dennis Viollet, "Shay" Brennan, Joe Carolan.

Seamus Anthony "Shay" Brennan (6 May 1937 – 9 June 2000) was an Irish footballer who played as a full-back for Manchester United and the Republic of Ireland national team.

== Career ==
His first game for the club came in an FA Cup match against Sheffield Wednesday on 19 February 1958; this was United's first game after the Munich air disaster and Brennan scored twice on an emotionally charged night. He was playing as an outside-left in this game, the position left vacant following the death of David Pegg and the injuries to Albert Scanlon in the crash.

He helped United to the 1965 and 1967 First Division championships, as well as the European Cup in 1968. Born in Manchester, England, he played internationally for the Republic of Ireland, qualifying through his parentage—the first Irish international to qualify in this way. He retired from Manchester United in 1970 after playing 359 games and scoring six goals.

Brennan moved to Ireland where he became player-manager with Waterford United, winning two titles and three further international caps. He left at the end of the 1973–74 season.

Brennan had his testimonial on 14 August 1986 when Shamrock Rovers defeated Manchester United 2–0 at Glenmalure Park.

He died, aged 63, after suffering a heart attack while playing golf at Courtown golf club, on 9 June 2000 and was buried at his adopted town of Tramore. He was the first member of the 1968 European Cup winning side to die, the second being George Best in November 2005.

== Honours ==
=== Player ===
Manchester United

- Football League First Division: 1964–65, 1966–67
- European Cup: 1967–68
- FA Charity Shield: 1965, 1967

=== Manager ===
Waterford United

- League of Ireland: 1971–72, 1972–73
- League of Ireland Cup: 1973–74
- Top Four Cup: 1970–71,1972–73
- Texaco Cup: 1974–75

== See also ==
- List of Republic of Ireland international footballers born outside the Republic of Ireland
