= Ronnie Briggs =

Northern Irish footballer

Personal information
- Full name: William Ronald Briggs
- Date of birth: 29 March 1943
- Place of birth: Belfast, Northern Ireland
- Date of death: 28 August 2008 (aged 65)
- Place of death: Bristol, England
- Height: 6 ft 2 in (1.88 m)
- Position: Goalkeeper

Youth career
- 1958–1960: Manchester United

Senior career*
| Years | Team | Apps | (Gls) |
| 1960–1964 | Manchester United | 9 | (0) |
| 1964–1965 | Swansea Town | 27 | (0) |
| 1965–1968 | Bristol Rovers | 35 | (0) |
| 1968–? | Frome Town | | |

International career
| 1962–1965 | Northern Ireland | 2 | (0) |
- * Club domestic league appearances and goals

William Ronald Briggs (29 March 1943 – 28 August 2008) was a Northern Irish footballer who played as a goalkeeper for Manchester United, Swansea Town and Bristol Rovers in the 1960s.

Born in Belfast, Briggs was scouted by Manchester United at the age of 15, and signed professional forms with them on his 17th birthday. His first team debut came 10 months later, in a First Division match away to Leicester City on 21 January 1961. However, his debut was unsuccessful; he conceded six goals as United lost 6–0. Briggs would go on to make a total of 11 appearances for the club, the last coming in 1962, before he was sold to Swansea Town in 1964. A year later, he was signed by Bristol Rovers, where he stayed until 1968, when he moved to Frome Town, thus ending his League football career.

Briggs also collected two caps for Northern Ireland, making his debut in a 4–0 loss to Wales in April 1962. His only other appearance was a 2–1 win over the Netherlands in 1965.

After retiring from football, Briggs went to live in Stapleton, Bristol, and worked in insurance, construction and security until a diagnosis of inoperable lung cancer in December 2007 forced his retirement in March 2008. Briggs died on 28 August 2008.
