= Mark Pearson (footballer) =

English footballer (1939–2023)

Personal information
- Full name: Mark Pearson
- Date of birth: 28 October 1939
- Place of birth: Ridgeway, Derbyshire, England
- Date of death: 2 September 2023 (aged 83)
- Height: 5 ft 6 in (1.68 m)
- Position: Inside forward

Youth career
- 1955–1957: Manchester United

Senior career*
Years	Team	Apps	(Gls)
1957–1963	Manchester United	68	(12)
1963–1965	Sheffield Wednesday	39	(9)
1965–1968	Fulham	58	(7)
1968–1969	Halifax Town	5	(0)
- Bacup Borough
- * Club domestic league appearances and goals

Mark Pearson (28 October 1939 – 2 September 2023) was an English footballer who played in the Football League as an inside forward for Manchester United, Sheffield Wednesday, Fulham and Halifax Town.

== Career ==
Born in Ridgeway, Derbyshire, Pearson joined Manchester United as a trainee in 1955 and signed professional forms two years later. He made his first-team debut as an 18-year-old on 19 February 1958 as part of the makeshift side that beat Sheffield Wednesday in United's first game after the Munich Air Crash. He was involved in two of the three goals, and The Times' correspondent was impressed:

But it was the performance of two young men, Cope at centre-half and the 17-year-old [sic] Pearson at inside-left, that left us rubbing our eyes in astonishment. Their maturity, polish, and skill left one wondering what other magic is hidden away in Old Trafford.

Pearson, nicknamed "Pancho" due to the Mexican appearance that his sideburns gave him, played for the club until 1963, making 80 appearances and scoring 14 goals, when he was sold to Sheffield Wednesday for a £17,000 fee. He did not make United's side for the 1963 FA Cup Final, where they defeated Leicester City 3–1 to clinch their first major trophy of the post-Munich era.

Despite his regular action for United in the immediate aftermath of the Munich crash, and the deaths of Tommy Taylor and Liam Whelan, Pearson was soon faced with competition for a regular place in the team when crash survivors Bobby Charlton and Dennis Viollet regained fitness, and gained a fresh rival that summer when United signed Albert Quixall. Over the next few years, competition for places became tighter due to the arrival of new signings David Herd and Denis Law, as well as the form of younger players including Johnny Giles.

In 1965, after two seasons at Hillsborough, Pearson joined Fulham and played a pivotal role in the club's escape from relegation in the 1965–66 season. Fulham seemed doomed until a 2–0 win against Liverpool, runaway league leaders and eventual champions, in which Ian St John was sent off for punching Pearson, sparked them into a sequence of 10 wins from their last 13 matches. He left Fulham for Halifax Town in 1968, playing just five league games before retiring the following year at the age of 29.

== Death ==
Mark Pearson died on 2 September 2023, at the age of 83. He was survived by his wife, Susan, and their two daughters, Jackie and Sarah.
