= Albert Quixall =

English footballer (1933–2020)

Personal information
- Date of birth: 9 August 1933
- Place of birth: Sheffield, West Riding of Yorkshire, England
- Date of death: 12 November 2020 (aged 87)
- Height: 5 ft 8 in (1.73 m)
- Position: Inside forward

Youth career
- 1948–1950: Sheffield Wednesday

Senior career*
Years	Team	Apps	(Gls)
1950–1958	Sheffield Wednesday	241	(63)
1958–1964	Manchester United	165	(50)
1964–1966	Oldham Athletic	37	(11)
1966–1967	Stockport County	13	(0)
1967	Altrincham	3	(0)
1968	Radcliffe Borough		
Total		459	(124)

International career
1953–1954	England B	3	(0)
1953–1955	England	5	(0)
1956	England U23	1	(0)
- * Club domestic league appearances and goals

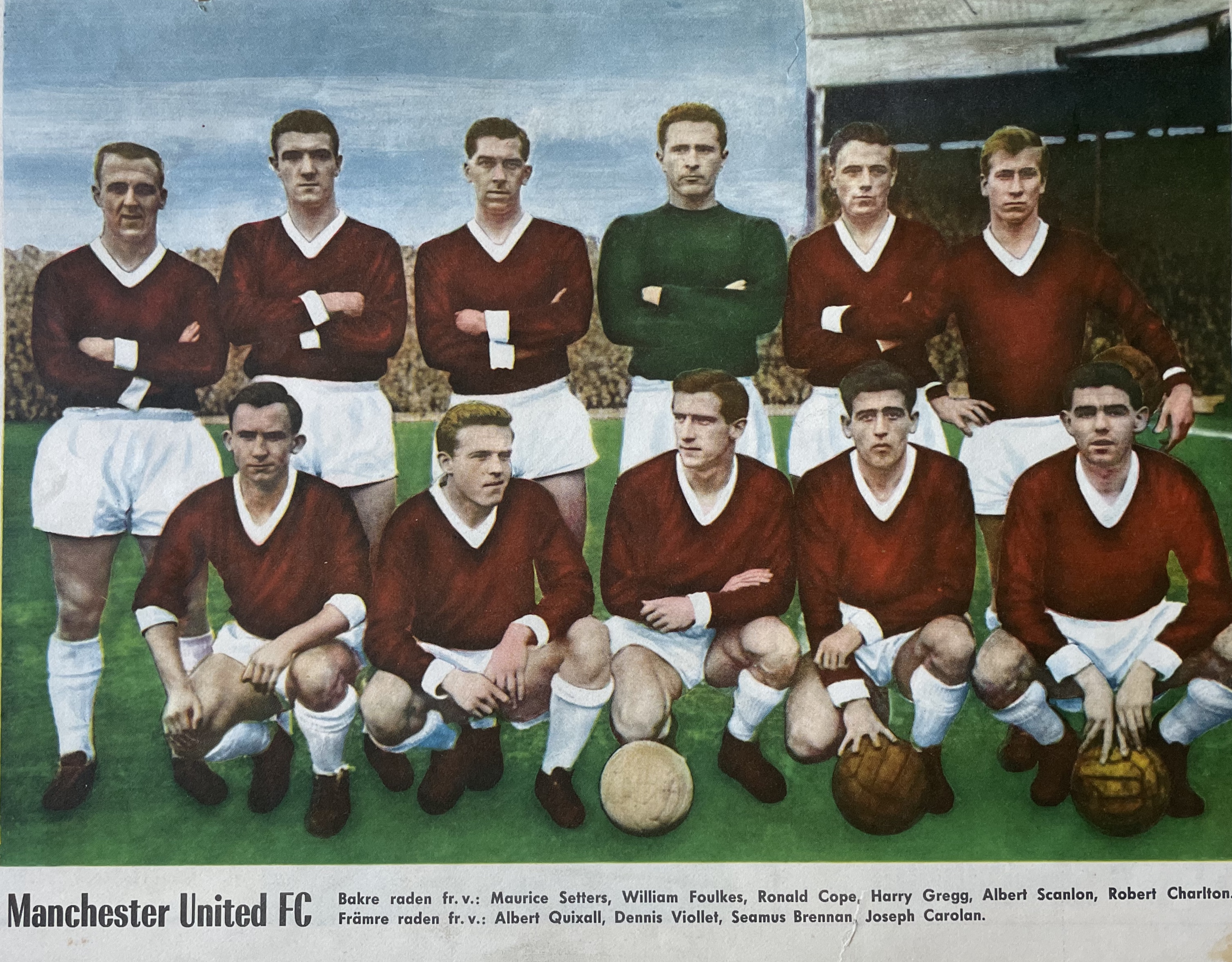
Manchester United F.C. in 1960 – from the left, standing: Maurice Setters, Bill Foulkes, Ronnie Cope, Harry Gregg, Albert Scanlon, Bobby Charlton. Front row: Warren Bradley, Albert Quixall, Dennis Viollet, Shay Brennan and Joe Carolan.

Albert Quixall (9 August 1933 – 12 November 2020) was an English professional footballer who played as an inside-forward. He joined Sheffield Wednesday as a youth and debuted in their professional side in 1951. He played almost 250 league games for Wednesday and became known as the "Golden Boy", also featuring five times for the England national team. Quixall joined Manchester United in 1958 for a record transfer fee, a signing made by Matt Busby to rebuild his team following the Munich air disaster. Quixall played 184 games for United and was regarded by Bobby Charlton as key to many of his goals in this era. He ended his football career at Oldham Athletic and Stockport County. In retirement he lived in Greater Manchester and ran a scrap metal firm.

== Early life ==
Born in Sheffield, West Riding of Yorkshire, on 9 August 1933, Quixall joined the ground staff of Sheffield Wednesday as a 14-year old. He played twice for the England schoolboys international team. Away from the club Quixall found work as an apprentice joiner.

== Club career ==
Quixall signed with Sheffield Wednesday as an amateur in 1948 and turned professional in 1950. He made his debut in February 1951 as a 17-year-old centre forward and went on to play almost 250 League games, scoring 66 League and Cup goals with the Owls. He was in his prime with Sheffield Wednesday and gained much media attention, becoming the "Golden Boy" of British football. He helped the club win promotion in 1952 and 1956 and appeared in the 1954 FA-Cup semi-final.

Quixall joined Manchester United in September 1958 for a then British record fee of £45,000, one of Matt Busby's key recruits in building a new team in the aftermath of the Munich air disaster, which had killed eight players and ended the careers of two others on 6 February that year. After seven games without a win for United, Quixall eventually helped the team go on a run of only two losses in 23 matches to end the season as runners-up in the First Division.

Quixall's only medal with the club was the 1963 FA Cup. Altogether, he scored 56 goals in 184 games for the Red Devils. Manchester United midfielder Bobby Charlton recalled in his autobiography that Quixall played a key role in many of his goals in this era. He noted that Quixall "played a significant role in my rush of goals. When I broke through an offside trap, often it was to get on to the end of one of Albert's perfectly placed passes".

Along with Johnny Giles and David Herd, he was dropped after Everton beat United 4–0 in the 1963 FA Charity Shield. He rarely featured in the 1963–64 season, last appearing for United on Boxing Day 1963. He left the club at the end of the season, moving to Oldham Athletic for £7,000, spending two years at Boundary Park before finishing his professional career at Stockport County in 1967. Quixall afterwards spent brief spells at non-league Altrincham and Radcliffe Borough.

== International career ==
Quixall was capped five times for England between 1953 and 1955. He made his first appearance in a world cup qualifying match against Wales on 10 October 1953 and his final appearance in a friendly against Portugal on 22 May 1955. He made the starting line-up four times and appeared once as a substitute.

He was the last surviving member of the England squad at the 1954 World Cup.

== Later life and death ==
After his football career ended Quixall moved to Greater Manchester and established a scrap metal business which he ran until his retirement. Sheffield Wednesday named a hospitality suite at Hillsborough in his honour. On 12 November 2020, Quixall died at the age of 87.

== Honours ==
Manchester United

- FA Cup: 1962–63
