= Alex Dawson =

Scottish footballer (1940–2020)

Personal information
- Full name: Alexander Downie Dawson
- Date of birth: 21 February 1940
- Place of birth: Aberdeen, Scotland
- Date of death: 17 July 2020 (aged 80)
- Height: 5 ft 10 in (1.78 m)
- Position: Forward

Senior career*
Years	Team	Apps	(Gls)
1957–1961	Manchester United	80	(45)
1961–1967	Preston North End	197	(114)
1967–1968	Bury	50	(21)
1968–1971	Brighton & Hove Albion	57	(26)
1970	→ Brentford (loan)	10	(6)
1971–1973	Corby Town		
Total		394	(212)

International career
- England Schoolboys
- * Club domestic league appearances and goals

Alexander Downie Dawson (21 February 1940 – 17 July 2020) was a Scottish footballer who played as a forward. He was born in Aberdeen in Scotland, but began his professional career with Manchester United, where he spent four years before joining nearby Preston North End in 1961. In six seasons there, he made almost 200 league appearances and scored 114 goals. He then spent a year with fellow Lancashire side Bury, before moving to Brighton & Hove Albion. In 1970, he went on loan to Brentford, but his league career ended the following year. He spent two more seasons playing for Corby Town before retiring in 1973.

== Career ==
Born in Aberdeen, Dawson started his career as a trainee with Manchester United under Matt Busby in the mid 1950s. He was given his First Division debut as a 17-year-old on 22 April 1957, when he scored in a 2–0 home win over Burnley in the First Division. He also found the net in United's next two league games against Cardiff City and West Bromwich Albion. These games came after United had sealed the First Division title for a second successive season.

In 1957–58, he made just one appearance during the first six months of the season, but then came the Munich air disaster in which eight Manchester United players died, including forwards Tommy Taylor and Liam Whelan, while Bobby Charlton and Dennis Viollet were unavailable for several weeks as they recovered from their injuries. He was on the scoresheet in United's first game after the crash, scoring one of United's goals in a 3–0 victory over Sheffield Wednesday in the fifth round of the FA Cup. He remained a regular player in the team until the season's end, scoring a hat-trick against Fulham in the FA Cup semi-final replay at Highbury, the last man to do so until Riyad Mahrez in 2023. He was in the team for the Wembley final against Bolton Wanderers, but United lost 2–0.

He faced competition for a first-team place from new signing Albert Quixall, which restricted him to 11 appearances in 1958–59. The subsequent two seasons saw Dawson enjoy more regular first team action, and in the 1960–61 season he scored 20 goals in all competitions.

Dawson's first team chances were limited in 1961–62 following the arrival of David Herd.

He left United for Preston North End in 1961 after scoring 54 goals in all competitions for the Red Devils. At Preston, he became known as the "Black Prince of Deepdale" and featured in their 1964 FA Cup final team. He scored in the final as Preston lost 3–2 to West Ham United. He later played for Bury, Brighton and Brentford.

Dawson died on 17 July 2020, aged 80.

== Honours ==
Manchester United

- FA Cup runner-up: 1957–58

Preston North End

- FA Cup runner-up: 1963–64
