= Colin Webster =

Welsh footballer

Personal information
- Full name: Colin Webster
- Date of birth: 17 July 1932
- Place of birth: Cardiff, Wales
- Date of death: 1 March 2001 (aged 68)
- Place of death: Swansea, Wales
- Height: 1.75 m (5 ft 9 in)
- Position: Inside forward

Senior career*
Years	Team	Apps	(Gls)
1950–1952	Cardiff City	0	(0)
1952–1958	Manchester United	65	(26)
1958–1963	Swansea Town	157	(66)
1963–1964	Newport County	31	(4)
Total		253	(96)

International career
1957–1958	Wales	4	(0)
- * Club domestic league appearances and goals

Colin Webster (17 July 1932 – 1 March 2001) was a Welsh footballer and Wales international. A striker, he played his club football for Manchester United, Swansea Town and Newport County and was part of the Wales squad for the 1958 FIFA World Cup in Sweden.

== Club career ==
Webster began his career at his home town club Cardiff City but, despite playing regularly for the reserve side while also working as a part-time motor fitter, he was unable to break into the first team. He was later brought to the attention of Manchester United by Jimmy Murphy and signed for the club in May 1952.

He was playing for Manchester United at the time of the Munich air disaster on 6 February 1958, but did not travel with the team due to ill health. He remained at the club for one year after the tragedy and played in the 1958 FA Cup final, collecting a runners-up medal as United were defeated by Bolton Wanderers. In 1958, he moved to Swansea Town for a fee of £7,5000 where he spent five years, finishing as top scorer for the club in the 1959–60 and 1960–61 seasons and winning the Welsh Cup in 1961.

Webster finished his professional career in 1964 with Newport County, later playing non-league football for Worcester City and Merthyr Tydfil.

== International career ==
Webster made his debut for Wales on 1 May 1957 in a 1–0 win over Czechoslovakia. The following year, he was named as part of the Wales squad for the 1958 FIFA World Cup. He played in 1–1 draws against Hungary and Mexico during the group stages and later replaced the injured John Charles in the quarter-final against Brazil.

On the eve of the Brazil match the Wales squad was enjoying a night out in Stockholm when Webster got into a fracas with a waiter, allegedly headbutting him and knocking out three of his teeth. Wales manager Jimmy Murphy - who was also Webster's club manager at Manchester United - was furious and wanted to send Webster home with the FAW members in agreement, but with the squad enduring so many injuries, Webster was reprieved but never played for Wales again after the World Cup.

== After retirement ==
Webster later ran a scaffolding business and later spent nine years working as a park ranger in Swansea. After breaking his leg in a fall, Webster took early retirement. He died from lung cancer on 1 March 2001 at the age of 68.

== Honours ==
Manchester United

- Football League First Division: 1955–56
- FA Cup runner-up: 1957–58
