= Tommy Heron =

Scottish footballer

Personal information
- Full name: Thomas Russell Ferrie Heron
- Date of birth: 31 March 1936 (age 90)
- Place of birth: Irvine, Scotland
- Position: Left-back

Senior career*
Years	Team	Apps	(Gls)
1956–1957	Queen's Park	5	(1)
1957	Kilmarnock	?	(?)
1957–1958	Portadown	?	(?)
1958–1961	Manchester United	3	(0)
1961–1966	York City	192	(6)
1966–1969	Altrincham	40	(1)
1967–1968	Hyde United	12	(1)
1969–1970	Droylsden	?	(?)
- * Club domestic league appearances and goals

Thomas Russell Ferrie Heron (born 31 March 1936) is a Scottish former footballer. Born in Irvine, he played as an outside left for Queen's Park before being moved to left-back by Manchester United. He moved to York City in 1961, where he made almost 200 league appearances.
