= Ronnie Cope =

English footballer and manager

Personal information
- Full name: Ronald Cope
- Date of birth: 5 October 1934
- Place of birth: Crewe, Cheshire, England
- Date of death: 27 August 2016 (aged 81)
- Position: Centre half

Youth career
- 1950–1951: Manchester United

Senior career*
Years	Team	Apps	(Gls)
1951–1961	Manchester United	93	(2)
1961–1963	Luton Town	28	(0)
1963–1968	Northwich Victoria	?	(10)
1968–1969	Winsford United	?	(?)
1968–1969	Nantwich	?	(1)
1969–1971	Northwich Victoria	?	(0)

Managerial career
- 1965–1966: Northwich Victoria
- * Club domestic league appearances and goals

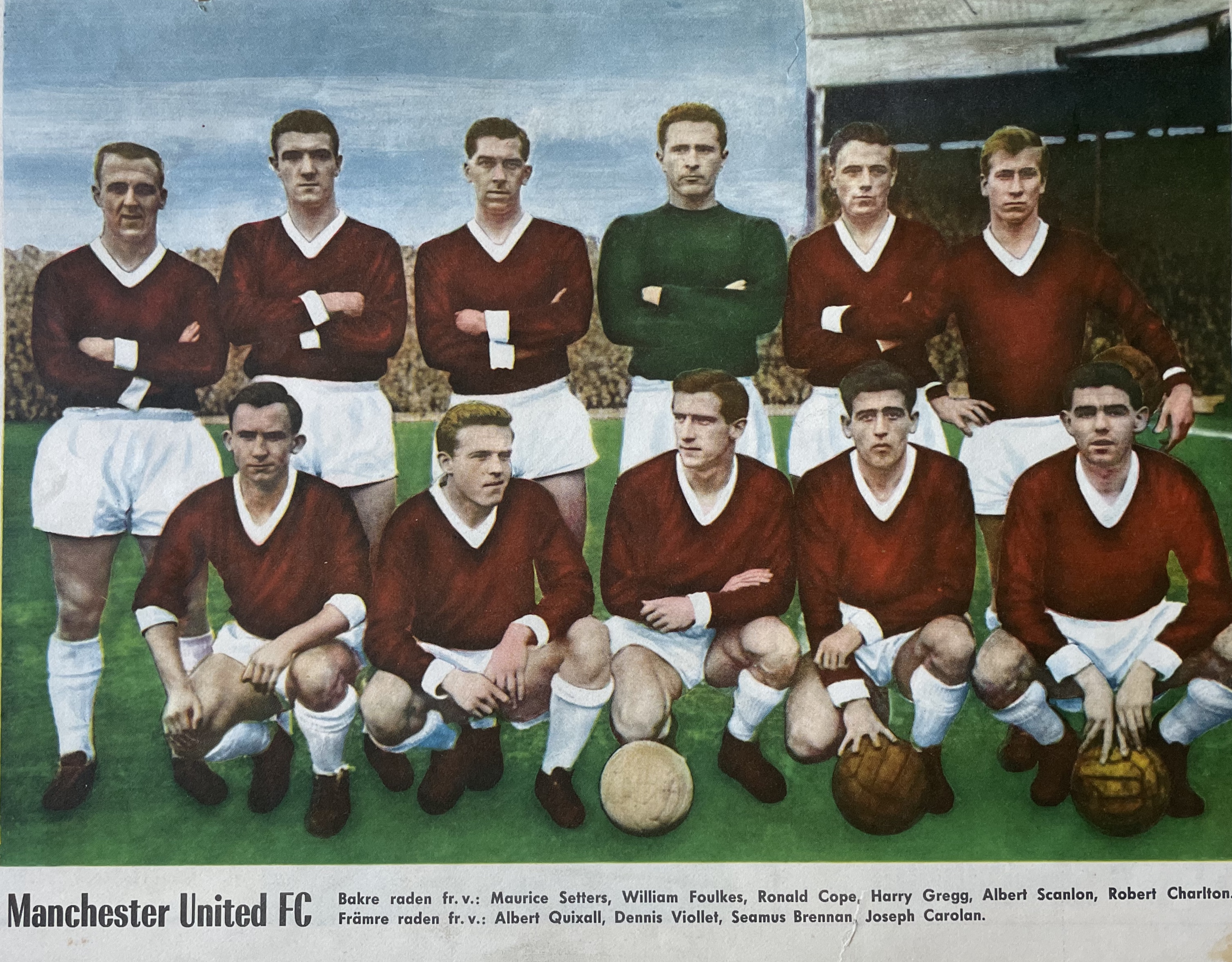
Manchester United F.C. in 1960 – from the left, standing: Maurice Setters, Bill Foulkes, Ronnie Cope, Harry Gregg, Albert Scanlon, Bobby Charlton. Front row from the left: Warren Bradley, Albert Quixall, Dennis Viollet, Shay Brennan and Joe Carolan.

Ronald Cope (5 October 1934 – 27 August 2016) was an English footballer from Crewe, Cheshire, who played as a centre half-back in the Football League for Manchester United and Luton Town.

Cope played four times for England Schoolboys in 1950. He joined Manchester United as an amateur in the same year, turned professional in 1951, and made his debut for the club on 29 September 1956 against Arsenal at Highbury. However, he only gained a regular first-team place after the Munich air disaster. He lost his first-team place to Bill Foulkes in October 1960, and left United for Luton Town in August 1961 on a £10,000 transfer. He left the professional scene two years later, although he continued to play at non-league level for Northwich Victoria and also served the Cheshire club as manager.

His father, George, had played for Crewe Alexandra, and he was considered a stand-out player in the squad, always being where he was needed. Like his father, Cope also played Cheshire County League football for Nantwich.

Cope died on 27 August 2016.

== Honours ==
Manchester United

- FA Cup runner-up: 1957–58
