= David Pegg =

English footballer (1935–1958)

- Pegg in 1956

Personal information
- Date of birth: 20 September 1935
- Place of birth: Highfields, Doncaster, South Yorkshire, England
- Date of death: 6 February 1958 (aged 22)
- Place of death: Munich, West Germany
- Position: Outside left

Youth career
- Manchester United

Senior career*
Years	Team	Apps	(Gls)
1952–1958	Manchester United	127	(24)

International career
	England U23	3	(?)
1957	England	1	(0)
- * Club domestic league appearances and goals

David Pegg (20 September 1935 – 6 February 1958) was an English footballer who played as an outside-left and one of the eight Manchester United players who died in the Munich air disaster on 6 February 1958.

== Career ==
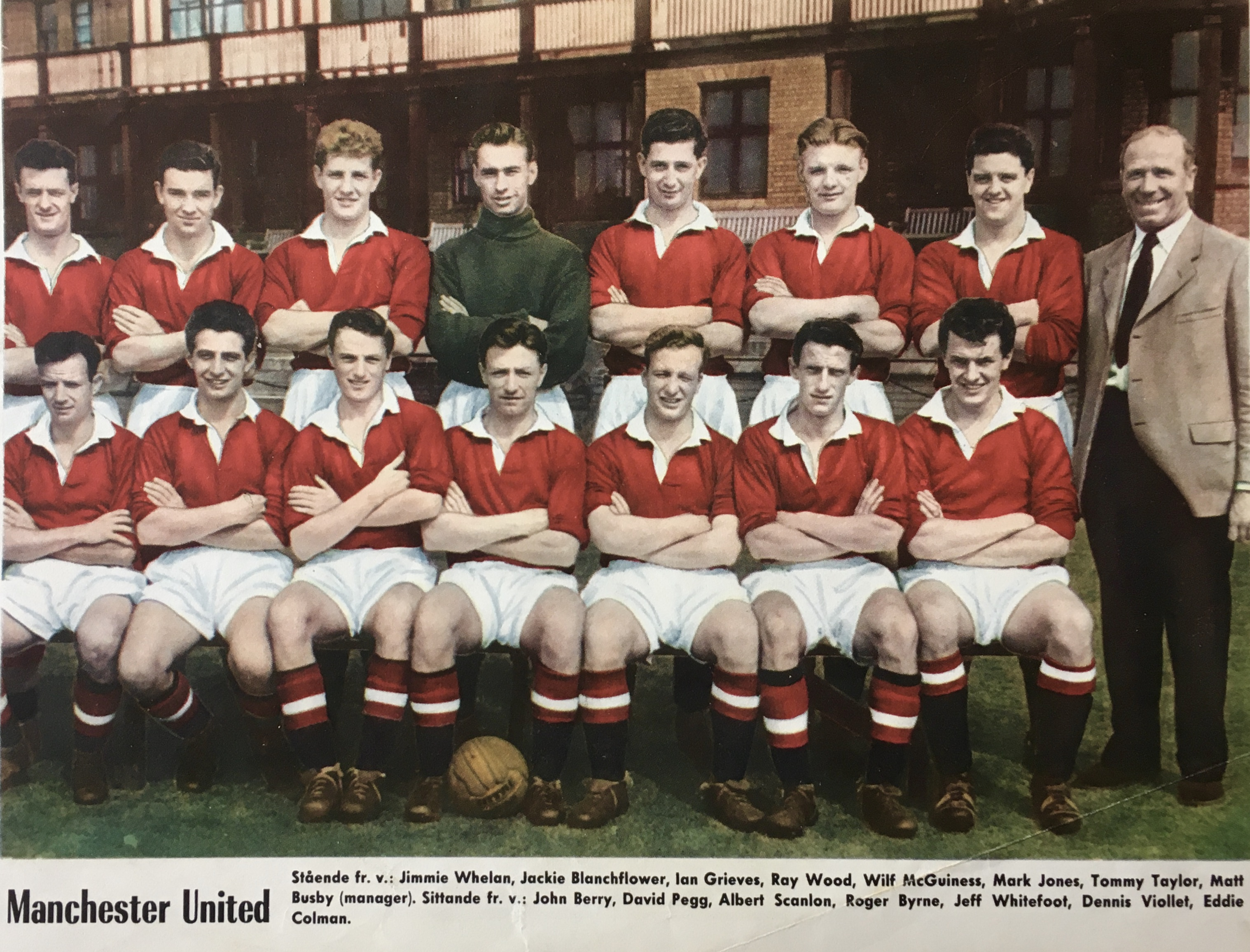
Pegg (front row, second from left) in a Manchester United team photo in 1957

He signed for United on leaving school in 1950 and made his first team debut in the Football League First Division against Middlesbrough on 6 December 1952, at the age of 17, and by the age of 20 he was a regular member of the first team. In 1956, at the age of 21, he collected a First Division title medal. The following season, he picked up another league title medal and also helped United reach the semi-finals of the European Cup, also collecting a runners-up medal in the FA Cup.

He was the club's first-choice outside left until the final few months before the disaster (when he was displaced by Albert Scanlon) and had collected two League Championship winner's medals in the two seasons leading up to the Munich air disaster. He also helped them reach the European Cup semi-finals twice. His performance against Real Madrid in the 1956-57 semi-finals reportedly inspired the Spanish giants to sign a new right-back specifically to combat Pegg's talents in the future, although his death less than a year later meant that he never played against them again.

He was capped once for the England national football team, his solitary appearance coming in 1957, and was tipped by many to succeed Tom Finney, who was nearing the end of his international career, in the England team as England's regular left winger.

== Legacy ==
Pegg's sister, Irene Beevers, contributed to a 1998 ITV documentary, The Busby Babes: End of a Dream, which commemorated the 40th anniversary of the tragedy. She, Pegg's brother and Pegg's other sister, Doreen Robinson (who now lives in Australia) visited the scene of the Munich air crash in September 2005, on what would have been his 70th birthday, to pay tribute to their brother.

== Personal life ==
He was born in Highfields, a village located in Doncaster, South Yorkshire, in September 1935, one of three children born to miner William Pegg and his wife Jessie. His father also played amateur football to a high standard during the 1930s, winning a number of trophies with local football teams.

Aged 22 when he died, he was one of the youngest of the 23 who died at Munich. He was buried in the nearby Redhouse Cemetery. A memorial chair was dedicated in his memory at St. George's Church in Highfields and when that church was closed the chair was moved to All Saints' Church in Woodlands which now serves both villages.

He was also outlived by both of his parents, though they have both since died; his father died in 1980 and his mother in 2006. They are both buried alongside him.

== Honours ==
Manchester United

- FA Cup runner-up: 1956–57
