= Albert Scanlon =

English footballer (1935–2009)

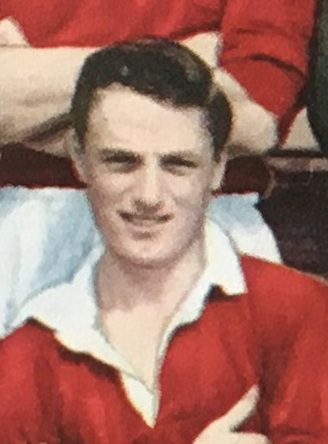
- Scanlon in 1957

Personal information
- Full name: Albert Joseph Scanlon
- Date of birth: 10 October 1935
- Place of birth: Hulme, Manchester, England
- Date of death: 22 December 2009 (aged 74)
- Place of death: Pendleton, Salford, England
- Height: 5 ft 10 in (1.78 m)
- Position: Outside left

Youth career
- Manchester United

Senior career*
Years	Team	Apps	(Gls)
1954–1960	Manchester United	115	(34)
1960–1962	Newcastle United	22	(5)
1962–1963	Lincoln City	47	(11)
1963–1966	Mansfield Town	108	(21)
1966	Belper Town		
Total		292	(71)
- * Club domestic league appearances and goals

Albert Joseph Scanlon (10 October 1935 – 22 December 2009) was an English footballer who played as an outside left. He began his career with Manchester United and was one of the "Busby Babes" who survived the Munich air disaster of 1958. Although he sustained severe injuries, he recovered and continued to play league football for Newcastle United, Lincoln City and Mansfield Town. He then went on to play non-league football until his retirement.

== Early life ==
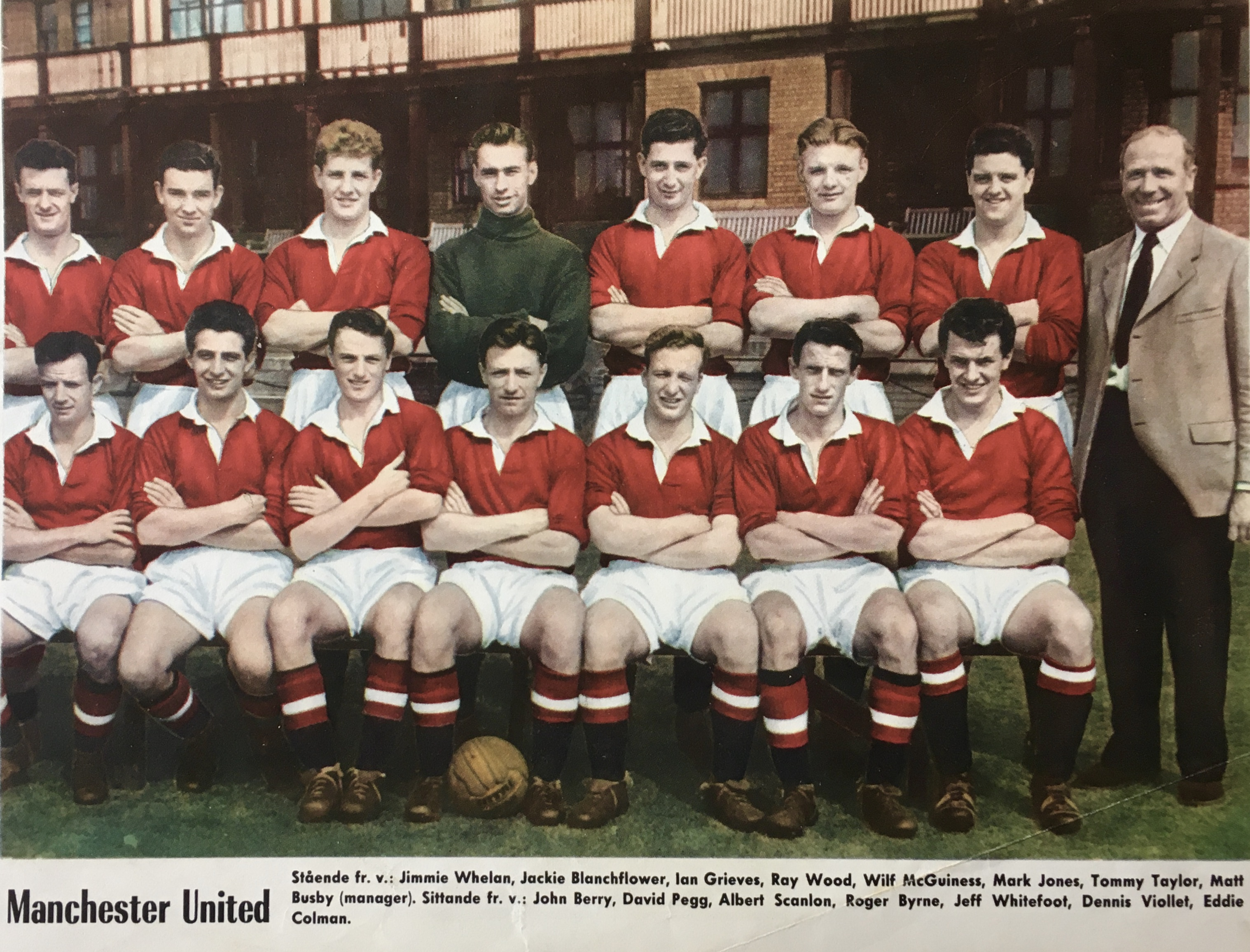
Scanlon (front row, third from left) in a Manchester United team photo in 1957.

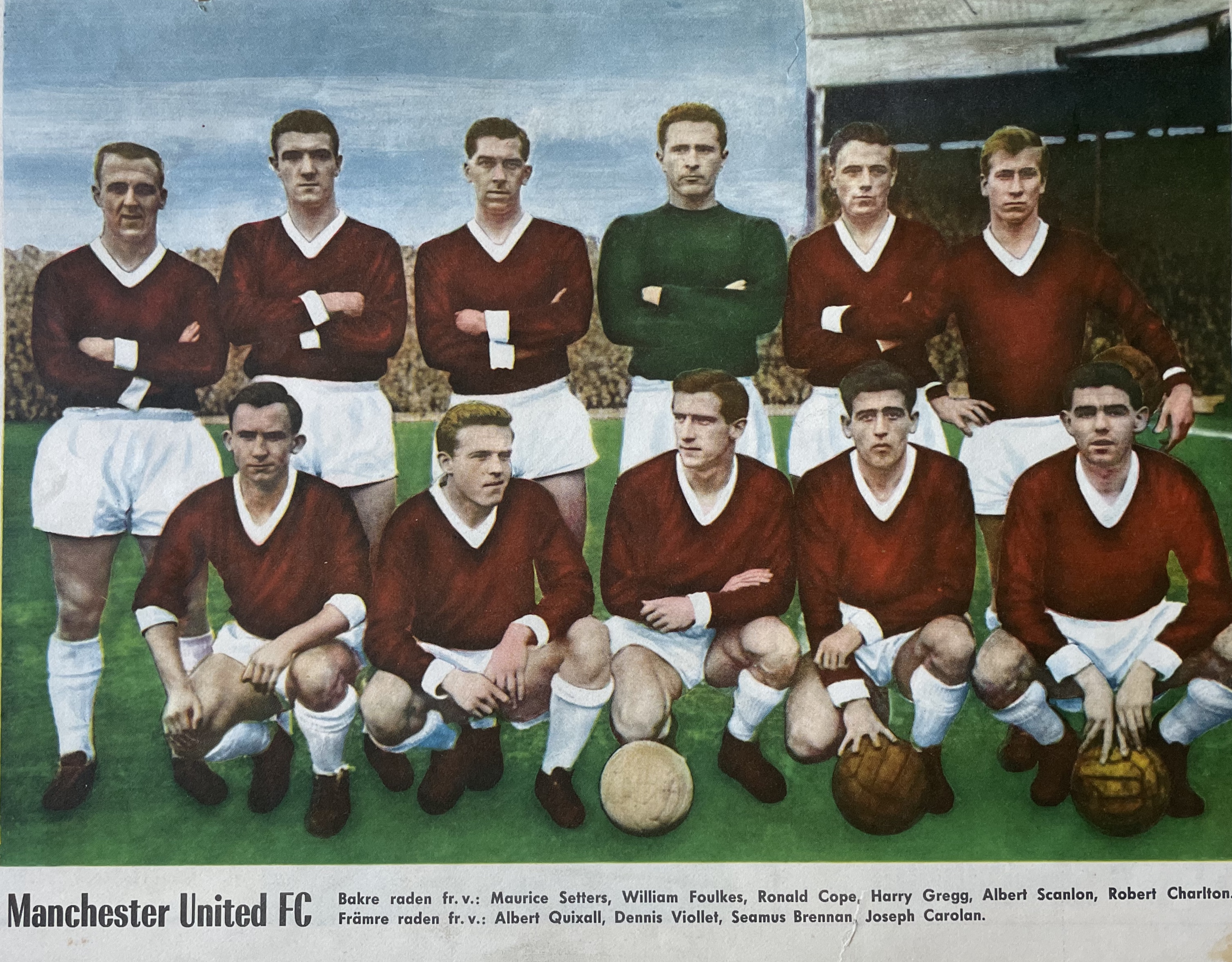
Scanlon ― standing row, 2nd from right ― team photo in 1960.

Born in Hulme, Manchester, Scanlon was a nephew of former Manchester United winger Charlie Mitten. He attended St Wilfred's School in Hulme. His talent for football was noticed early on, and he was selected to play for the Manchester Boys side. He joined the Manchester United groundstaff in 1950, before signing a professional contract in December 1952.

== Manchester United ==
Scanlon made his way through the Manchester United youth system, winning two FA Youth Cups in 1953 and 1954 before making his first-team debut against Arsenal on 20 November 1954. Scanlon was involved in two league title wins – in 1956 and 1957 – but he failed to make enough appearances to earn a winners' medal on either occasion, with David Pegg being United's regular left winger during this time. Scanlon was occasionally used as a right winger, which was the regular position of Johnny Berry.

On 5 February 1958, Scanlon started on the left wing in United's European Cup quarter-final second leg away to Red Star Belgrade; for five of the players who started the game, it was to be their last match for the club. The next day, on the return journey to Manchester, the team's plane crashed while attempting to take off from Munich airport, in an incident that later became known as the Munich air disaster. The crash killed 23 of the plane's 44 passengers and crew, and Scanlon suffered a fractured skull, a broken leg and kidney damage. He did not play again that season.

He made a full recovery and was back in action at the start of the following season, going on to appear in every game that season, scoring 16 goals in the process.

== Later career ==
Scanlon was sold to Newcastle United for £18,000 in November 1960, but his time on Tyneside was not a success and he then dropped down to a lower level to play for Lincoln City in February 1962. He was on the move again just over a year later, joining Mansfield Town in April 1963, just in time to participate in the club's celebrations at being promoted to the Third Division. Mansfield narrowly missed out on promotion to the Second Division two years later, finishing third in Division Three, but they dropped to 19th the following season and Scanlon dropped out of league football. He joined Belper Town in 1966, and retired shortly afterwards.

== Later years and death ==
Following his retirement, Scanlon returned to the Manchester area and worked in a succession of jobs outside football, including working as a security guard at a Colgate-Palmolive factory near Old Trafford, and being a docker in Salford.

In 2006, Scanlon complained about several "inaccuracies" in an episode of Surviving Disaster focussing on the Munich air disaster, despite being consulted by the production company.

On 13 May 2007, Scanlon presented the Premier League trophy to Manchester United along with former teammate Bill Foulkes.

He attended United's victorious Champions League final appearance in May 2008 in Moscow, being flown to the game in Russia on a private jet hired by United, along with fellow Munich survivors Bobby Charlton and Harry Gregg. Bill Foulkes, the other remaining survivor, attended the game as well.

Scanlon was admitted to the Salford Royal Hospital with kidney problems and pneumonia on 21 October 2009. He was in intensive care for more than a month, and died on 22 December 2009, aged 74. His funeral was held on 13 January 2010, and more than 300 people attended the service at All Souls' Church in Weaste, including fellow Munich survivors Bobby Charlton, Harry Gregg and Bill Foulkes, and former Manchester United players Denis Law and Nobby Stiles.
