= 1962–63 Manchester United F.C. season =

English football club season

Manchester United F.C.
1962–63 season
- Chairman: Harold Hardman
- Manager: Matt Busby
- First Division: 19th place
- FA Cup: Champion
- Top goalscorer: League: Denis Law (23 goals); All: Denis Law (29 goals)
- Highest home attendance: 63,437 vs Everton (29 August 1962)
- Lowest home attendance: 27,496 vs Nottingham Forest (8 December 1962)
- Average home league attendance: 41,297
Home colours	Away colours

The 1962–63 season was Manchester United's 61st consecutive season in the Football League, and their 18th consecutive season in the top division of English football. They finished a disappointing 19th in the league, narrowly avoiding relegation, but also finished the season as FA Cup winners with a 3–1 win over Leicester City in the final. It was a successful first season at the club for record signing Denis Law, who scored 23 goals in the league and 29 in all competitions. The FA Cup win was United's first major trophy for six years and the first trophy they had won since the Munich air disaster.

The Big Freeze of 1962–1963, was one of the coldest winters on record Football matches in the English leagues suffered because of the severe effects of the winter weather. Some matches in the FA Cup were rescheduled ten or more times. Matches in the fifth and sixth rounds, scheduled for 16 February and 9 March respectively, were played on 16 and 30 March. A board known as the Pools Panel was set up to adjudicate postponed matches to provide the football pool results. From 26 December to 23 February, United completed no league matches. The delays occurred before under-soil heating became widespread at major venues. When the thaw arrived, a backlog of fixtures had to be hastily determined. The Football League season was extended by four weeks from its original finishing date of 27 April. The final league fixtures took place one day before the rescheduled FA Cup final.

== First Division ==
Date	Opponents	H / A	Result F–A	Scorers	Attendance
18 August 1962	West Bromwich Albion	H	2–2	Herd, Law	51,685
22 August 1962	Everton	A	1–3	Moir	69,501
25 August 1962	Arsenal	A	3–1	Herd (2), Chisnall	62,308
29 August 1962	Everton	H	0–1		63,437
1 September 1962	Birmingham City	H	2–0	Giles, Herd	39,847
5 September 1962	Bolton Wanderers	A	0–3		44,859
8 September 1962	Leyton Orient	A	0–1		24,901
12 September 1962	Bolton Wanderers	H	3–0	Herd (2), Cantwell	37,721
15 September 1962	Manchester City	H	2–3	Law (2)	49,193
22 September 1962	Burnley	H	2–5	Law, Stiles	45,954
29 September 1962	Sheffield Wednesday	A	0–1		40,520
6 October 1962	Blackpool	A	2–2	Herd (2)	33,242
13 October 1962	Blackburn Rovers	H	0–3		42,252
24 October 1962	Tottenham Hotspur	A	2–6	Herd, Quixall	51,314
27 October 1962	West Ham United	H	3–1	Quixall (2), Law	29,204
3 November 1962	Ipswich Town	A	5–3	Law (4), Herd	18,483
10 November 1962	Liverpool	H	3–3	Giles, Herd, Quixall	43,810
17 November 1962	Wolverhampton Wanderers	A	3–2	Law (2), Herd	27,305
24 November 1962	Aston Villa	H	2–2	Quixall (2)	36,852
1 December 1962	Sheffield United	A	1–1	Charlton	25,173
8 December 1962	Nottingham Forest	H	5–1	Herd (2), Charlton, Giles, Law	27,496
15 December 1962	West Bromwich Albion	A	0–3		18,113
26 December 1962	Fulham	A	1–0	Charlton	23,928
23 February 1963	Blackpool	H	1–1	Herd	43,121
2 March 1963	Blackburn Rovers	A	2–2	Charlton, Law	27,924
9 March 1963	Tottenham Hotspur	H	0–2		53,416
18 March 1963	West Ham United	A	1–3	Herd	28,950
23 March 1963	Ipswich Town	H	0–1		32,792
1 April 1963	Fulham	H	0–2		28,124
9 April 1963	Aston Villa	A	2–1	Charlton, Stiles	26,867
13 April 1963	Liverpool	A	0–1		51,529
15 April 1963	Leicester City	H	2–2	Charlton, Herd	50,005
16 April 1963	Leicester City	A	3–4	Law (3)	37,002
20 April 1963	Sheffield United	H	1–1	Law	31,179
22 April 1963	Wolverhampton Wanderers	H	2–1	Herd, Law	36,147
1 May 1963	Sheffield Wednesday	H	1–3	Setters	31,878
4 May 1963	Burnley	A	1–0	Law	30,266
6 May 1963	Arsenal	H	2–3	Law (2)	35,999
10 May 1963	Birmingham City	A	1–2	Law	21,814
15 May 1963	Manchester City	A	1–1	Quixall	52,424
18 May 1963	Leyton Orient	H	3–1	Charlton, Law, own goal	32,759
20 May 1963	Nottingham Forest	A	2–3	Giles, Herd	16,130

Pos	Team	Pld	W	D	L	GF	GA	GAv	Pts	Qualification or relegation
17	Ipswich Town	42	12	11	19	59	78	0.756	35	
18	Bolton Wanderers	42	15	5	22	55	75	0.733	35	
19	Manchester United	42	12	10	20	67	81	0.827	34	Qualification for the European Cup Winners' Cup first round
20	Birmingham City	42	10	13	19	63	90	0.700	33	
21	Manchester City (R)	42	10	11	21	58	102	0.569	31	Relegation to the Second Division

Source: World Football
Rules for classification: 1) Points; 2) Goal average; 3) Goals scored
(R) Relegated

== FA Cup ==
Date	Round	Opponents	H / A	Result F–A	Scorers	Attendance
4 March 1963	Round 3	Huddersfield Town	H	5–0	Law (3), Giles, Quixall	47,703
11 March 1963	Round 4	Aston Villa	H	1–0	Quixall	52,265
16 March 1963	Round 5	Chelsea	H	2–1	Law, Quixall	48,298
30 March 1963	Round 6	Coventry City	A	3–1	Charlton (2), Quixall	44,000
27 April 1963	Semi-final	Southampton	N	1–0	Law	65,000
25 May 1963	Final	Leicester City	N	3–1	Herd (2), Law	100,000

== Squad statistics ==
Pos.	Name	League		FA Cup		Total	
Pos.	Name	Apps	Goals	Apps	Goals	Apps	Goals
GK	(England) David Gaskell	18	0	2	0	20	0
GK	(Northern Ireland) Harry Gregg	24	0	4	0	28	0
FB	(Republic of Ireland) Shay Brennan	37	0	4	0	41	0
FB	(Republic of Ireland) Noel Cantwell	25	1	5	0	30	1
FB	(Republic of Ireland) Tony Dunne	25	0	3	0	28	0
HB	(Scotland) Paddy Crerand	19	0	3	0	22	0
HB	(England) Bill Foulkes	41	0	6	0	47	0
HB	(England) Frank Haydock	1	0	0	0	1	0
HB	(England) Nobby Lawton	12	0	0	0	12	0
HB	(Northern Ireland) Jimmy Nicholson	10	0	0	0	10	0
HB	(England) Maurice Setters	27	1	6	0	33	1
HB	(England) Nobby Stiles	31	2	4	0	35	2
FW	(England) Bobby Charlton	28	7	6	2	34	9
FW	(England) Phil Chisnall	6	1	0	0	6	1
FW	(Republic of Ireland) Johnny Giles	36	4	6	1	42	5
FW	(Scotland) David Herd	37	19	6	2	43	21
FW	(Scotland) Denis Law	38	23	6	6	44	29
FW	(Northern Ireland) Sammy McMillan	4	0	0	0	4	0
FW	(Scotland) Ian Moir	9	1	0	0	9	1
FW	(England) Mark Pearson	2	0	0	0	2	0
FW	(England) Albert Quixall	31	7	5	4	36	11
FW	(England) Dennis Walker	1	0	0	0	1	0
–	Own goals	–	1	–	0	–	1
