= 1963–64 Manchester United F.C. season =

English football club season

Manchester United F.C.
1963–64 season
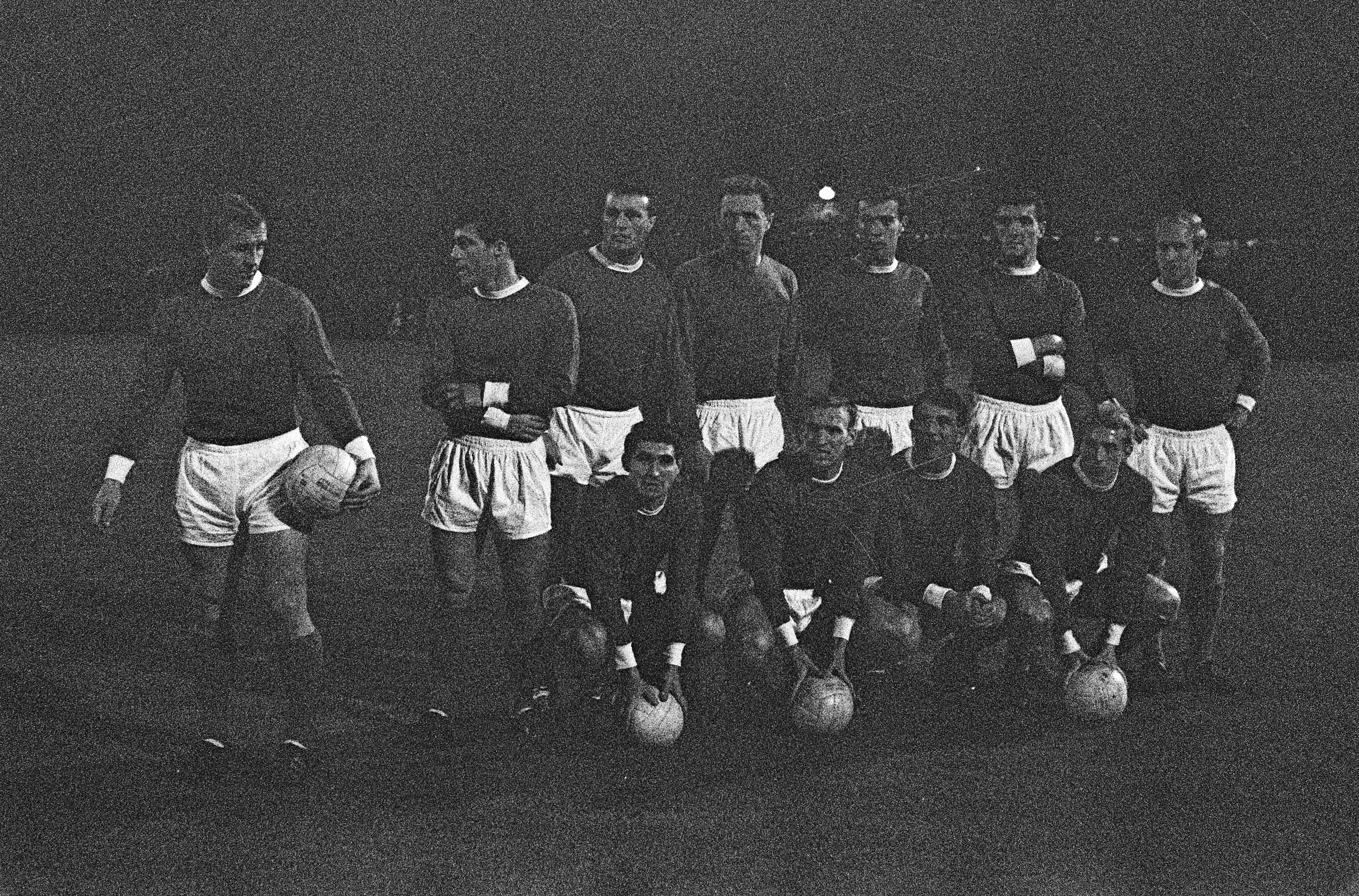
- The United team that faced Willem II in the Cup Winners' Cup, 25 September 1963
- Chairman: Harold Hardman
- Manager: Matt Busby
- First Division: 2nd
- FA Cup: Semi-finals
- Cup Winners' Cup: Quarter-finals
- Charity Shield: Runners-up
- Top goalscorer: League: Denis Law (30); All: Denis Law (46)
- Highest home attendance: 63,700 vs Sunderland (29 February 1964)
- Lowest home attendance: 25,848 vs Aston Villa (6 April 1964)
- Average home league attendance: 45,891
Home colours	Away colours

The 1963–64 season was Manchester United's 62nd season in the Football League, and their 19th consecutive season in the top division of English football. United failed to win any major trophies this season, but they made a strong challenge for the three major prizes, finishing second in the league, reaching the semi-finals of the FA Cup and the quarter-finals of the European Cup Winners' Cup. A notable debutant this season was 17-year-old Northern Irish forward George Best, whose debut came in the league against West Bromwich Albion on 14 September 1963. The highly promising Best turned out a total of 17 times for United that season, scoring four goals. Striker Denis Law had an outstanding season, scoring 30 goals in the league and a total of 46 in all competitions, which is still the club record.

== FA Charity Shield ==
Date	Opponents	H / A	Result F–A	Scorers	Attendance
17 August 1963	Everton	A	0–4		54,840

== First Division ==
Date	Opponents	H / A	Result F–A	Scorers	Attendance
24 August 1963	Sheffield Wednesday	A	3–3	Charlton (2), Moir	32,177
28 August 1963	Ipswich Town	H	2–0	Law (2)	39,921
31 August 1963	Everton	H	5–1	Chisnall (2), Law (2), Sadler	62,965
3 September 1963	Ipswich Town	A	7–2	Law (3), Chisnall, Moir, Sadler, Setters	28,113
7 September 1963	Birmingham City	A	1–1	Chisnall	36,874
11 September 1963	Blackpool	H	3–0	Charlton (2), Law	47,400
14 September 1963	West Bromwich Albion	H	1–0	Sadler	50,453
16 September 1963	Blackpool	A	0–1		29,806
21 September 1963	Arsenal	A	1–2	Herd	56,776
28 September 1963	Leicester City	H	3–1	Herd (2), Setters	41,374
2 October 1963	Chelsea	A	1–1	Setters	45,351
5 October 1963	Bolton Wanderers	A	1–0	Herd	35,872
19 October 1963	Nottingham Forest	A	2–1	Chisnall, Quixall	41,426
26 October 1963	West Ham United	H	0–1		45,120
28 October 1963	Blackburn Rovers	H	2–2	Quixall (2)	41,169
2 November 1963	Wolverhampton Wanderers	A	0–2		34,159
9 November 1963	Tottenham Hotspur	H	4–1	Law (3), Herd	57,413
16 November 1963	Aston Villa	A	0–4		36,276
23 November 1963	Liverpool	H	0–1		54,654
30 November 1963	Sheffield United	A	2–1	Law (2)	30,615
7 December 1963	Stoke City	H	5–2	Law (4), Herd	52,232
14 December 1963	Sheffield Wednesday	H	3–1	Herd (3)	35,139
21 December 1963	Everton	A	0–4		48,027
26 December 1963	Burnley	A	1–6	Herd	35,764
28 December 1963	Burnley	H	5–1	Herd (2), Moore (2), Best	47,834
11 January 1964	Birmingham City	H	1–2	Sadler	44,695
18 January 1964	West Bromwich Albion	A	4–1	Law (2), Best, Charlton	25,624
1 February 1964	Arsenal	H	3–1	Herd, Law, Setters	48,340
8 February 1964	Leicester City	A	2–3	Herd, Law	35,538
19 February 1964	Bolton Wanderers	H	5–0	Best (2), Herd (2), Charlton	33,926
22 February 1964	Blackburn Rovers	A	3–1	Law (2), Chisnall	36,726
7 March 1964	West Ham United	A	2–0	Herd, Sadler	27,027
21 March 1964	Tottenham Hotspur	A	3–2	Charlton, Law, Moore	56,392
23 March 1964	Chelsea	H	1–1	Law	42,931
27 March 1964	Fulham	A	2–2	Herd, Law	41,769
28 March 1964	Wolverhampton Wanderers	H	2–2	Charlton, Herd	44,470
30 March 1964	Fulham	H	3–0	Crerand, Foulkes, Herd	42,279
4 April 1964	Liverpool	A	0–3		52,559
6 April 1964	Aston Villa	H	1–0	Law	25,848
13 April 1964	Sheffield United	H	2–1	Law, Moir	27,587
18 April 1964	Stoke City	A	1–3	Charlton	45,670
25 April 1964	Nottingham Forest	H	3–1	Law (2), Moore	31,671

Pos	Team	Pld	W	D	L	GF	GA	GAv	Pts	Qualification or relegation
1	Liverpool (C)	42	26	5	11	92	45	2.044	57	Qualification for the European Cup preliminary round
2	Manchester United	42	23	7	12	90	62	1.452	53	Qualification for the Inter-Cities Fairs Cup first round
3	Everton	42	21	10	11	84	64	1.313	52	Qualification for the Inter-Cities Fairs Cup first round
4	Tottenham Hotspur	42	22	7	13	97	81	1.198	51	
5	Chelsea	42	20	10	12	72	56	1.286	50	

Source: World Football
Rules for classification: 1) Points; 2) Goal average; 3) Goals scored
(C) Champions

== FA Cup ==
Date	Round	Opponents	H / A	Result F–A	Scorers	Attendance
4 January 1964	Round 3	Southampton	A	3–2	Crerand, Herd, Moore	29,164
25 January 1964	Round 4	Bristol Rovers	H	4–1	Law (3), Herd	55,772
15 February 1964	Round 5	Barnsley	A	4–0	Law (2), Best, Herd	38,076
29 February 1964	Round 6	Sunderland	H	3–3	Best, Charlton, own goal	63,700
4 March 1964	Round 6 Replay	Sunderland	A	2–2	Charlton, Law	68,000
9 March 1964	Round 6; 2nd Replay	Sunderland	N	5–1	Law (3), Chisnall, Herd	54,952
14 March 1964	Semi-final	West Ham United	N	1–3	Law	65,000

== European Cup Winners' Cup ==
Date	Round	Opponents	H / A	Result F–A	Scorers	Attendance
25 September 1963	First round First leg	Willem II	A	1–1	Herd	20,000
15 October 1963	First round Second leg	Willem II	H	6–1	Law (3), Charlton, Chisnall, Setters	46,272
3 December 1963	Second round First leg	Tottenham Hotspur	A	0–2		57,447
10 December 1963	Second round Second leg	Tottenham Hotspur	H	4–1	Charlton (2), Herd (2)	50,000
26 February 1964	Quarter-final; First leg	Sporting CP	H	4–1	Law (3), Charlton	60,000
18 March 1964	Quarter-final; Second leg	Sporting CP	A	0–5		40,000

== Squad statistics ==
Pos.	Name	League		FA Cup		Cup Winners' Cup		Other		Total	
Pos.	Name	Apps	Goals	Apps	Goals	Apps	Goals	Apps	Goals	Apps	Goals
GK	(England) David Gaskell	17	0	7	0	4	0	1	0	29	0
GK	(Northern Ireland) Harry Gregg	25	0	0	0	2	0	0	0	27	0
FB	(Republic of Ireland) Shay Brennan	17	0	5	0	2	0	0	0	24	0
FB	(Republic of Ireland) Noel Cantwell	28	0	2	0	4	0	1	0	35	0
FB	(Republic of Ireland) Tony Dunne	40	0	7	0	6	0	1	0	54	0
HB	(Scotland) Paddy Crerand	41	1	7	1	6	0	1	0	55	2
HB	(England) Bill Foulkes	41	1	7	0	6	0	1	0	55	1
HB	(England) Maurice Setters	32	4	7	0	6	1	1	0	46	5
HB	(England) Nobby Stiles	17	0	2	0	2	0	0	0	21	0
HB	(England) Wilf Tranter	1	0	0	0	0	0	0	0	1	0
FW	(England) Willie Anderson	2	0	1	0	0	0	0	0	3	0
FW	(Northern Ireland) George Best	17	4	7	2	2	0	0	0	26	6
FW	(England) Bobby Charlton	40	9	7	2	6	4	1	0	54	15
FW	(England) Phil Chisnall	20	6	4	1	4	1	0	0	28	8
FW	(Republic of Ireland) Johnny Giles	0	0	0	0	0	0	1	0	1	0
FW	(Scotland) David Herd	30	20	7	4	6	3	1	0	44	27
FW	(Scotland) Denis Law	30	30	6	10	5	6	1	0	42	46
FW	(Scotland) Ian Moir	18	3	0	0	0	0	0	0	18	3
FW	(Wales) Graham Moore	18	4	1	1	0	0	0	0	19	5
FW	(England) Albert Quixall	9	3	0	0	3	0	1	0	13	3
FW	(England) David Sadler	19	5	0	0	2	0	0	0	21	5
