= 1965–66 Manchester United F.C. season =

English football club season

Manchester United F.C.
1965–66 season
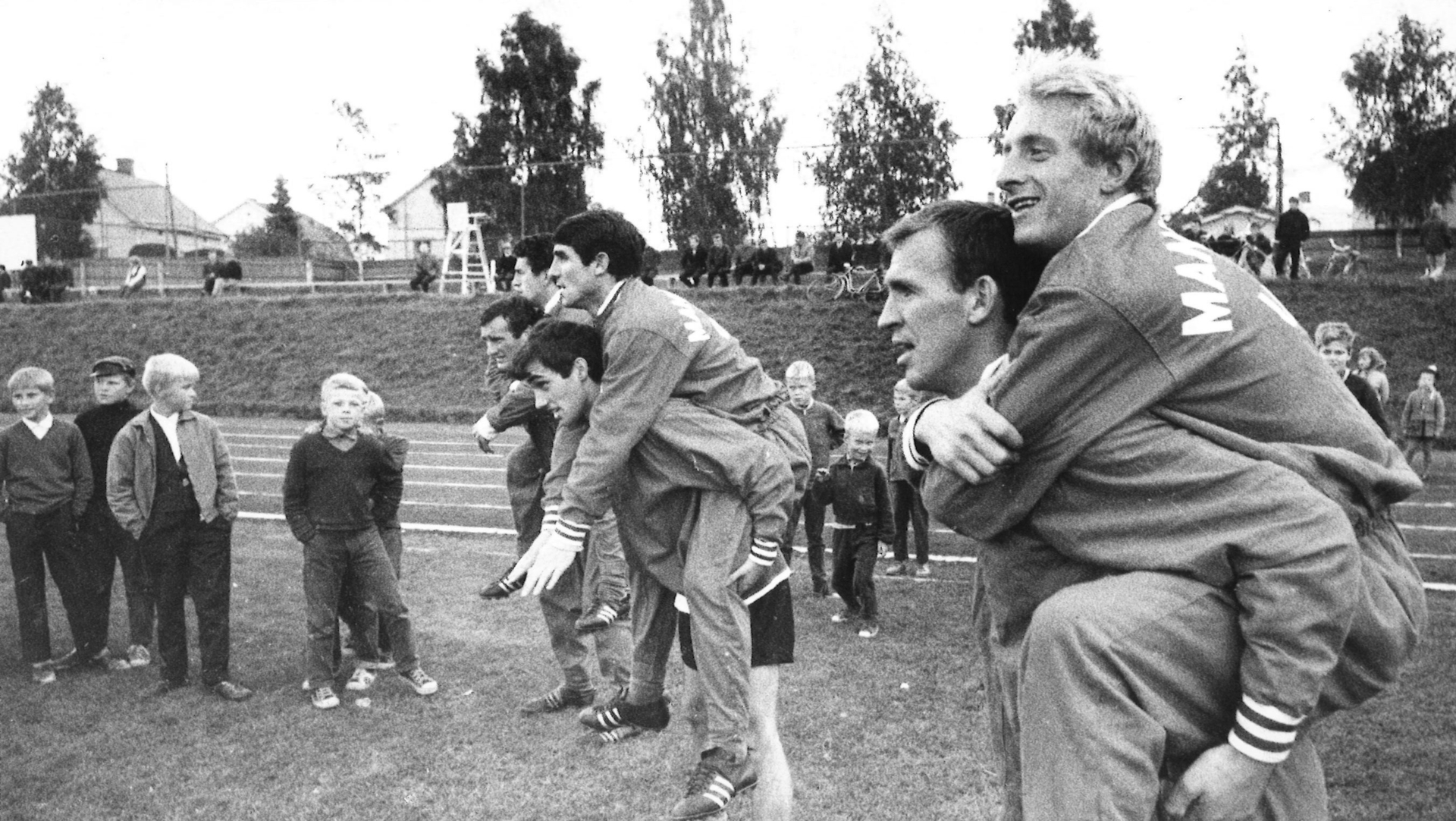
- Manchester United players during their preseason tour in Finland, 21 September 1965. In front Paddy Crerand carries Denis Law; middle George Best carries Tony Dunne; at back Noel Cantwell carries Pat Dunne.
- Chairman: Louis Edwards
- Manager: Matt Busby
- First Division: 4th
- FA Cup: Semi-finals
- European Cup: Semi-finals
- Charity Shield: Shared
- Top goalscorer: League: David Herd (24); All: David Herd (33)
- Highest home attendance: 64,035 vs Benfica (2 February 1966)
- Lowest home attendance: 23,039 vs Aston Villa (9 May 1966)
- Average home league attendance: 41,352
Home colours	Away colours	Third colours

The 1965–66 season was Manchester United's 64th season in the Football League, and their 21st consecutive season in the top division of English football.

As defending champions of the First Division title, they finished fourth and secured qualification for the Inter-Cities Fairs Cup. They lost to eventual winners Everton in the FA Cup semifinal.

In the European Cup, they were also semi-finalists, edged out by Yugoslav champions Partizan Belgrade. They had to negotiate a preliminary round of the competition before qualifying for the first round, and did so by achieving a 9–2 aggregate win over Finnish champions HJK Helsinki.

United's top scorer for this season was David Herd, with 24 league goals and 33 in all competitions.

== FA Charity Shield ==
Date	Opponents	H / A	Result F–A	Scorers	Attendance
14 August 1965	Liverpool	H	2–2	Best, Herd	48,502

== First Division ==
Date	Opponents	H / A	Result F–A	Scorers	Attendance
21 August 1965	Sheffield Wednesday	H	1–0	Herd	37,524
24 August 1965	Nottingham Forest	A	2–4	Aston, Best	33,744
28 August 1965	Northampton Town	A	1–1	Connelly	21,140
1 September 1965	Nottingham Forest	H	0–0		38,777
4 September 1965	Stoke City	H	1–1	Herd	37,603
8 September 1965	Newcastle United	A	2–1	Herd, Law	57,380
11 September 1965	Burnley	A	0–3		30,235
15 September 1965	Newcastle United	H	1–1	Stiles	30,401
18 September 1965	Chelsea	H	4–1	Law (3), Charlton	37,917
25 September 1965	Arsenal	A	2–4	Aston, Charlton	56,757
9 October 1965	Liverpool	H	2–0	Best, Law	58,161
16 October 1965	Tottenham Hotspur	A	1–5	Charlton	58,051
23 October 1965	Fulham	H	4–1	Herd (3), Charlton	32,716
30 October 1965	Blackpool	A	2–1	Herd (2)	24,703
6 November 1965	Blackburn Rovers	H	2–2	Charlton, Law	38,823
13 November 1965	Leicester City	A	5–0	Herd (2), Best, Charlton, Connelly	34,551
20 November 1965	Sheffield United	H	3–1	Best (2), Law	37,922
4 December 1965	West Ham United	H	0–0		32,924
11 December 1965	Sunderland	A	3–2	Best (2), Herd	37,417
15 December 1965	Everton	H	3–0	Best, Charlton, Herd	32,624
18 December 1965	Tottenham Hotspur	H	5–1	Law (2), Charlton, Herd, Beal (o.g.)	39,270
27 December 1965	West Bromwich Albion	H	1–1	Law	54,102
1 January 1966	Liverpool	A	1–2	Law	53,790
8 January 1966	Sunderland	A	1–1	Best	39,162
12 January 1966	Leeds United	A	1–1	Herd	49,672
15 January 1966	Fulham	A	1–0	Charlton	33,018
29 January 1966	Sheffield Wednesday	A	0–0		39,281
5 February 1966	Northampton Town	H	6–2	Charlton (3), Law (2), Connelly	34,986
19 February 1966	Stoke City	A	2–2	Connelly, Herd	36,667
26 February 1966	Burnley	H	4–2	Herd (3), Charlton	49,892
12 March 1966	Chelsea	A	0–2		60,269
19 March 1966	Arsenal	H	2–1	Law, Stiles	47,246
6 April 1966	Aston Villa	A	1–1	Cantwell	28,211
9 April 1966	Leicester City	H	1–2	Connelly	42,593
16 April 1966	Sheffield United	A	1–3	Sadler	22,330
25 April 1966	Everton	A	0–0		50,843
27 April 1966	Blackpool	H	2–1	Charlton, Law	26,953
30 April 1966	West Ham United	A	2–3	Aston, Cantwell	36,416
4 May 1966	West Bromwich Albion	A	3–3	Aston, T. Dunne, Herd	22,609
7 May 1966	Blackburn Rovers	A	4–1	Herd (2), Charlton, Sadler	14,513
9 May 1966	Aston Villa	H	6–1	Herd (2), Sadler (2), Charlton, Ryan	23,039
19 May 1966	Leeds United	H	1–1	Herd	35,008

Pos	Team	Pld	W	D	L	GF	GA	GAv	Pts	Qualification or relegation
2	Leeds United	42	23	9	10	79	38	2.079	55	Qualification for the Inter-Cities Fairs Cup second round
3	Burnley	42	24	7	11	79	47	1.681	55	Qualification for the Inter-Cities Fairs Cup first round
4	Manchester United	42	18	15	9	84	59	1.424	51	
5	Chelsea	42	22	7	13	65	53	1.226	51	
6	West Bromwich Albion	42	19	12	11	91	69	1.319	50	Qualification for the Inter-Cities Fairs Cup second round

Source: World Football
Rules for classification: 1) Points; 2) Goal average; 3) Goals scored

== FA Cup ==
Date	Round	Opponents	H / A	Result F–A	Scorers	Attendance
22 January 1966	Round 3	Derby County	A	5–2	Best (2), Law (2), Herd	33,827
12 February 1966	Round 4	Rotherham United	H	0–0		54,263
15 February 1966	Round 4 Replay	Rotherham United	A	1–0	Connelly	23,500
5 March 1966	Round 5	Wolverhampton Wanderers	A	4–2	Law (2), Best, Herd	53,500
26 March 1966	Round 6	Preston North End	A	1–1	Herd	37,876
30 March 1966	Round 6 Replay	Preston North End	H	3–1	Law (2), Connelly	60,433
23 April 1966	Semi-final	Everton	N	0–1		60,000

== European Cup ==
Date	Round	Opponents	H / A	Result F–A	Scorers	Attendance
22 September 1965	Preliminary round First leg	HJK Helsinki	A	3–2	Connelly, Herd, Law	25,000
6 October 1965	Preliminary round Second leg	HJK Helsinki	H	6–0	Connelly (3), Best (2), Charlton	30,388
17 November 1965	Round 1 First leg	Vorwärts Berlin	A	2–0	Connelly, Law	40,000
1 December 1965	Round 1 Second leg	Vorwärts Berlin	H	3–1	Herd (3)	30,082
2 February 1966	Quarter-final; First leg	Benfica	H	3–2	Foulkes, Herd, Law	64,035
9 March 1966	Quarter-final; Second leg	Benfica	A	5–1	Best (2), Charlton, Connelly, Crerand	75,000
13 April 1966	Semi-final; First leg	Partizan	A	0–2		60,000
20 April 1966	Semi-final; Second leg	Partizan	H	1–0	Stiles	62,500

== Squad statistics ==
Pos.	Name	League		FA Cup		European Cup		Other		Total	
Pos.	Name	Apps	Goals	Apps	Goals	Apps	Goals	Apps	Goals	Apps	Goals
GK	(Republic of Ireland) Pat Dunne	8	0	0	0	2	0	1	0	11	0
GK	(England) David Gaskell	8	0	0	0	1	0	0	0	9	0
GK	(Northern Ireland) Harry Gregg	26	0	7	0	5	0	0	0	38	0
FB	(Republic of Ireland) Shay Brennan	28	0	5	0	5	0	1	0	39	0
FB	(Republic of Ireland) Noel Cantwell	23	2	2	0	3	0	1	0	29	2
FB	(Republic of Ireland) Tony Dunne	40	1	7	0	8	0	1	0	56	0
FB	(England) Bobby Noble	2	0	0	0	0	0	0	0	2	0
HB	(Scotland) Paddy Crerand	41	0	7	0	7	1	1	0	56	1
HB	(Scotland) John Fitzpatrick	3(1)	0	0	0	1	0	0	0	4(1)	0
HB	(England) Bill Foulkes	33	0	7	0	8	1	0	0	48	1
HB	(England) Nobby Stiles	39	2	7	0	8	1	1	0	55	3
FW	(England) Willie Anderson	5(1)	0	1	0	1	0	0	0	7(1)	0
FW	(England) John Aston, Jr.	23	4	2	0	2	0	1	0	28	4
FW	(Northern Ireland) George Best	31	9	5	3	6	4	1	1	43	17
FW	(England) Bobby Charlton	38	16	7	0	8	2	1	0	54	18
FW	(England) John Connelly	31(1)	5	6	2	8	6	0	0	45(1)	13
FW	(Scotland) David Herd	36(1)	24	7	3	7	5	1	1	51(1)	33
FW	(Scotland) Denis Law	33	15	7	6	8	3	1	0	49	24
FW	(Scotland) Jimmy Ryan	4	1	0	0	0	0	0	0	4	1
FW	(England) David Sadler	10	4	0	0	0	0	0	0	10	4
