= 1964–65 Manchester United F.C. season =

English football club season

Manchester United F.C.
1964–65 season
- Chairman: Harold Hardman
- Manager: Matt Busby
- First Division: 1st
- FA Cup: Semi-finals
- Inter-Cities Fairs Cup: Semi-finals
- Top goalscorer: League: Denis Law (28); All: Denis Law (39)
- Lowest home attendance: 25,721 vs Birmingham City (16 December 1964)
- Average home league attendance: 44,886
Home colours	Away colours	Third colours

The 1964–65 season was Manchester United's 63rd season in the Football League, and their 20th consecutive season in the top division of English football. They finished the season as league champions for the sixth time in their history, with teenage winger George Best making headlines by establishing himself in the first team and finding the net 10 times in the league and 14 times in all competitions, though Denis Law was once again the club's top goalscorer with 28 goals in the league and 39 in all competitions.

== First Division ==
Date	Opponents	H / A	Result F–A	Scorers	Attendance
22 August 1964	West Bromwich Albion	H	2–2	Charlton, Law	52,007
24 August 1964	West Ham United	A	1–3	Law	37,070
29 August 1964	Leicester City	A	2–2	Law, Sadler	32,373
2 September 1964	West Ham United	H	3–1	Best, Connelly, Law	45,123
5 September 1964	Fulham	A	1–2	Connelly	36,291
8 September 1964	Everton	A	3–3	Connelly, Herd, Law	63,024
12 September 1964	Nottingham Forest	H	3–0	Herd (2), Connelly	45,012
16 September 1964	Everton	H	2–1	Best, Law	49,968
19 September 1964	Stoke City	A	2–1	Connelly, Herd	40,031
26 September 1964	Tottenham Hotspur	H	4–1	Crerand (2), Law (2)	53,058
30 September 1964	Chelsea	A	2–0	Best, Law	60,769
3 October 1964	Burnley	A	0–0		30,761
10 October 1964	Sunderland	H	1–0	Herd	48,577
17 October 1964	Wolverhampton Wanderers	A	4–2	Law (2), Herd, own goal	26,763
24 October 1964	Aston Villa	H	7–0	Law (4), Herd (2), Connelly	35,807
31 October 1964	Liverpool	A	2–0	Crerand, Herd	52,402
7 November 1964	Sheffield Wednesday	H	1–0	Herd	50,178
14 November 1964	Blackpool	A	2–1	Connelly, Herd	31,129
21 November 1964	Blackburn Rovers	H	3–0	Best, Connelly, Herd	49,633
28 November 1964	Arsenal	A	3–2	Law (2), Connelly	59,627
5 December 1964	Leeds United	H	0–1		53,374
12 December 1964	West Bromwich Albion	A	1–1	Law	28,126
16 December 1964	Birmingham City	H	1–1	Charlton	25,721
26 December 1964	Sheffield United	A	1–0	Best	37,295
28 December 1964	Sheffield United	H	1–1	Herd	42,219
16 January 1965	Nottingham Forest	A	2–2	Law (2)	43,009
23 January 1965	Stoke City	H	1–1	Law	50,392
6 February 1965	Tottenham Hotspur	A	0–1		58,639
13 February 1965	Burnley	H	3–2	Best, Charlton, Herd	38,865
24 February 1965	Sunderland	A	0–1		51,336
27 February 1965	Wolverhampton Wanderers	H	3–0	Charlton (2), Connelly	37,018
13 March 1965	Chelsea	H	4–0	Herd (2), Best, Law	56,261
15 March 1965	Fulham	H	4–1	Connelly (2), Herd (2)	45,402
20 March 1965	Sheffield Wednesday	A	0–1		33,549
22 March 1965	Blackpool	H	2–0	Law (2)	42,318
3 April 1965	Blackburn Rovers	A	5–0	Charlton (3), Connelly, Herd	29,363
12 April 1965	Leicester City	H	1–0	Herd	34,114
17 April 1965	Leeds United	A	1–0	Connelly	52,368
19 April 1965	Birmingham City	A	4–2	Best (2), Cantwell, Charlton	28,907
24 April 1965	Liverpool	H	3–0	Law (2), Connelly	55,772
26 April 1965	Arsenal	H	3–1	Law (2), Best	51,625
28 April 1965	Aston Villa	A	1–2	Charlton	36,081

Pos	Team	Pld	W	D	L	GF	GA	GAv	Pts	Qualification or relegation
1	Manchester United (C)	42	26	9	7	89	39	2.282	61	Qualification for the European Cup preliminary round
2	Leeds United	42	26	9	7	83	52	1.596	61	Qualification for the Inter-Cities Fairs Cup first round
3	Chelsea	42	24	8	10	89	54	1.648	56	Qualification for the Inter-Cities Fairs Cup first round
4	Everton	42	17	15	10	69	60	1.150	49	Qualification for the Inter-Cities Fairs Cup first round
5	Nottingham Forest	42	17	13	12	71	67	1.060	47	

Source: World Football
Rules for classification: 1) Points; 2) Goal average; 3) Goals scored
(C) Champions

== FA Cup ==
Date	Round	Opponents	H / A	Result F–A	Scorers	Attendance
9 January 1965	Round 3	Chester City	H	2–1	Best, Kinsey	40,000
30 January 1965	Round 4	Stoke City	A	0–0		53,009
3 February 1965	Round 4 Replay	Stoke City	H	1–0	Herd	50,814
20 February 1965	Round 5	Burnley	H	2–1	Crerand, Law	54,000
10 March 1965	Round 6	Wolverhampton Wanderers	A	5–3	Law (2), Best, Crerand, Herd	53,581
27 March 1965	Semi-final	Leeds United	N	0–0		65,000
31 March 1965	Semi-final; Replay	Leeds United	N	0–1		46,300

== Inter-Cities Fairs Cup ==
Date	Round	Opponents	H / A	Result F–A	Scorers	Attendance
23 September 1964	First round First leg	Djurgården	A	1–1	Herd	6,537
27 October 1964	First round Second leg	Djurgården	H	6–1	Law (3), Charlton (2), Best	38,437
11 November 1964	Second round First leg	Borussia Dortmund	A	6–1	Charlton (3), Best, Herd, Law	25,000
2 December 1964	Second round Second leg	Borussia Dortmund	H	4–0	Charlton (2), Connelly, Law	31,896
20 January 1965	Third round First leg	Everton	H	1–1	Connelly	50,000
9 February 1965	Third round Second leg	Everton	A	2–1	Connelly, Herd	54,397
12 May 1965	Quarter-final; First leg	Strasbourg	A	5–0	Law (2), Charlton, Connelly, Herd	30,000
19 May 1965	Quarter-final; Second leg	Strasbourg	H	0–0		34,188
31 May 1965	Semi-final; First leg	Ferencváros	H	3–2	Herd (2), Law	39,902
6 June 1965	Semi-final; Second leg	Ferencváros	A	0–1		50,000
16 June 1965	Semi-final; Play-off	Ferencváros	A	1–2	Connelly	60,000

== Squad statistics ==
Pos.	Name	League		FA Cup		Inter-Cities Fairs Cup		Total	
Pos.	Name	Apps	Goals	Apps	Goals	Apps	Goals	Apps	Goals
GK	(Republic of Ireland) Pat Dunne	37	0	7	0	11	0	55	0
GK	(England) David Gaskell	5	0	0	0	0	0	5	0
FB	(Republic of Ireland) Shay Brennan	42	0	7	0	11	0	60	0
FB	(Republic of Ireland) Noel Cantwell	2	1	0	0	0	0	2	1
FB	(Republic of Ireland) Tony Dunne	42	0	7	0	11	0	60	0
HB	(Scotland) Paddy Crerand	39	3	7	2	11	0	57	5
HB	(Scotland) John Fitzpatrick	2	0	0	0	0	0	2	0
HB	(England) Bill Foulkes	42	0	7	0	11	0	60	0
HB	(England) Maurice Setters	5	0	0	0	1	0	6	0
HB	(England) Nobby Stiles	41	0	7	0	11	0	59	0
FW	(England) John Aston, Jr.	1	0	0	0	0	0	1	0
FW	(Northern Ireland) George Best	41	10	7	2	11	2	59	14
FW	(England) Bobby Charlton	41	10	7	0	11	8	59	18
FW	(England) John Connelly	42	15	7	0	11	5	60	20
FW	(Scotland) David Herd	37	20	7	2	11	6	55	28
FW	(England) Albert Kinsey	0	0	1	1	0	0	1	1
FW	(Scotland) Denis Law	36	28	6	3	10	8	52	39
FW	(Scotland) Ian Moir	1	0	0	0	0	0	1	0
FW	(England) David Sadler	6	1	0	0	0	0	6	1
–	Own goals	–	1	–	0	–	0	–	1
