= George Best =

Northern Irish footballer (1946–2005)

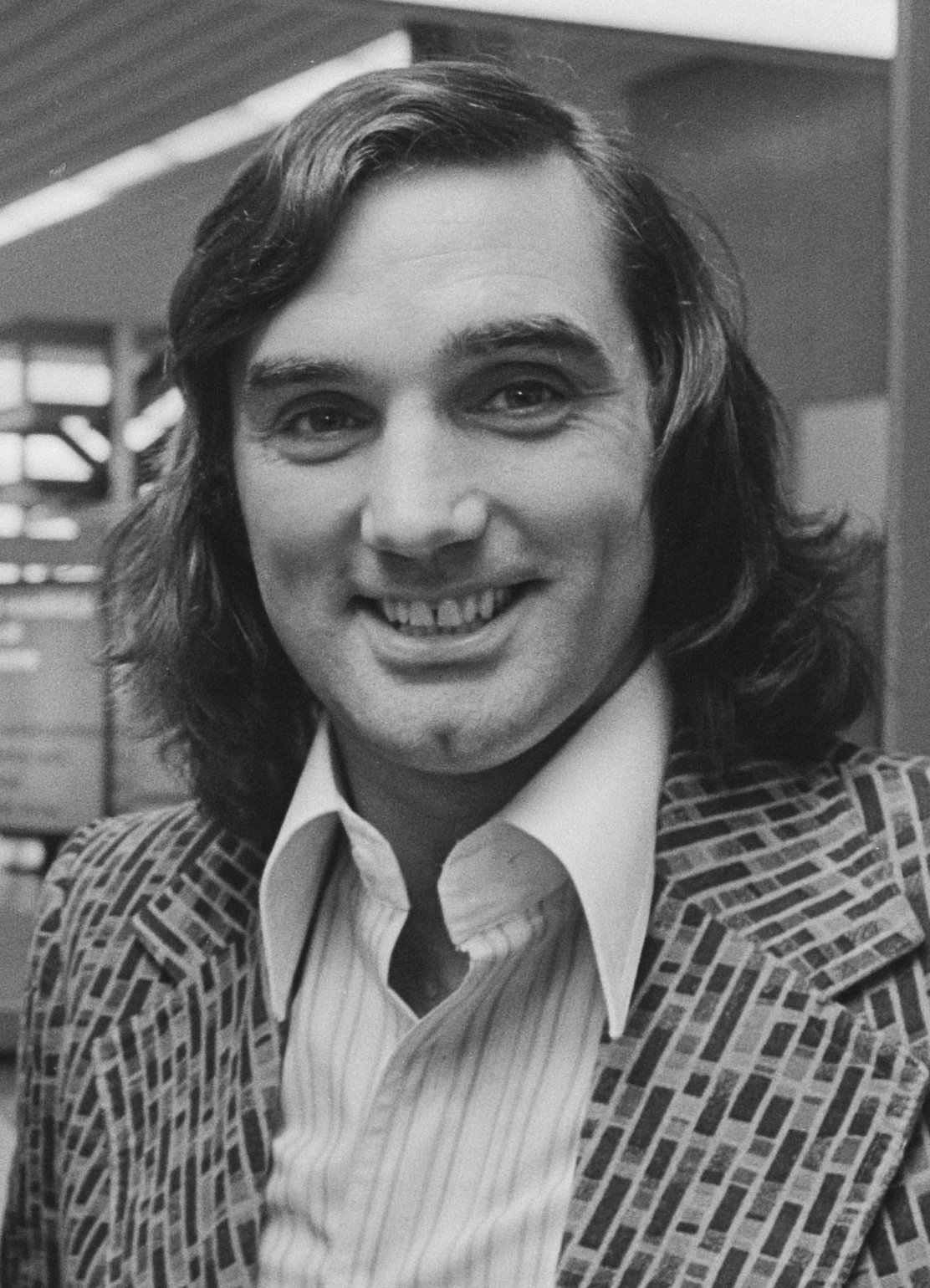
- Best in 1976

Personal information
- Full name: George Best
- Date of birth: 22 May 1946
- Place of birth: Belfast, Northern Ireland
- Date of death: 25 November 2005 (aged 59)
- Place of death: London, England
- Height: 5 ft 9 in (1.75 m)
- Positions: Right winger; attacking midfielder

Youth career
- 1960–1961: Cregagh Boys Club
- 1961–1963: Manchester United

Senior career*
Years	Team	Apps	(Gls)
1963–1974	Manchester United	361	(137)
1974	Jewish Guild	5	(1)
1974	Dunstable Town	2	(0)
1975	Stockport County	3	(2)
1975–1976	Cork Celtic	3	(0)
1976	Los Angeles Aztecs	23	(15)
1976–1977	Fulham	42	(8)
1977–1978	Los Angeles Aztecs	32	(12)
1978–1979	Fort Lauderdale Strikers	28	(6)
1979–1980	Hibernian	17	(3)
1980–1981	San Jose Earthquakes	56	(21)
1982	Sea Bee		
1982	Hong Kong Rangers		
1982–1983	AFC Bournemouth	5	(0)
1983	Brisbane Lions	4	(0)
1984	Tobermore United	0	(0)
Total		616	(204)

International career
1964–1977	Northern Ireland	37	(9)
- * Club domestic league appearances and goals

George Best (22 May 1946 – 25 November 2005) was a Northern Irish professional footballer who played as a right winger, spending most of his club career at Manchester United. A skillful dribbler, he is considered one of the greatest players of all time, along with being considered one of the most talented to play. He was named European Footballer of the Year in 1968 and came fifth in the FIFA Player of the Century vote. Best received plaudits for his playing style, which combined pace, skill, balance, feints, the ability to get past defenders and goalscoring. In 1999 he was on the six-man shortlist for the BBC's Sports Personality of the Century. He was an inaugural inductee into the English Football Hall of Fame in 2002.

Born in Belfast, Best began his club career in England with Manchester United, with the scout who had spotted his talent at the age of 15 sending a telegram to manager Matt Busby which read: "I think I've found you a genius". After making his debut at age 17, he scored 179 goals in 470 appearances over 11 years and was the club's top goalscorer in the league for five consecutive seasons. He won two League titles, two Charity Shields and the European Cup with the club.

In international football, Best was capped 37 times for Northern Ireland between 1964 and 1977. A combination of the team's performance and his lack of fitness in 1982 meant that he never played in the finals of a major tournament. He considered his international career as being "recreational football", with the expectations placed on a smaller nation in Northern Ireland being much less than with his club. He is regarded as one of the greatest players never to have played at a World Cup. The Irish Football Association described him as the "greatest player to ever pull on the green shirt of Northern Ireland".

With his good looks, dark Beatle mop-top hair and playboy lifestyle, Best became one of the first media celebrity footballers, earning the nickname "o Quinto Beatle" by Portuguese press reporters after a stand-out performance for Manchester United in Lisbon in March 1966. However, his extravagant lifestyle led to various personal problems, most notably alcoholism, from which he suffered for the rest of his life. These issues affected him on and off the field, often causing controversy. Although conscious of his problems, he made light of them and was known for his intelligence and wit on the subject during periods of sobriety: "I spent a lot of money on booze, girls and fast cars – the rest I just squandered". After football, he spent some time as a football analyst, but his financial and health problems continued into his retirement. He died in 2005, aged 59, from complications from the immunosuppressive drugs he needed to take after a liver transplant in 2002.

== Early years and family ==
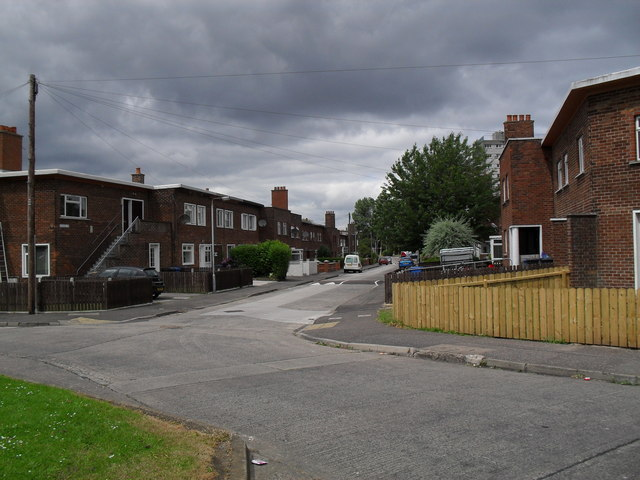
Best grew up on the Cregagh estate, east Belfast. The playing fields in the estate where he played football as a boy, Cregagh Green, is protected for community recreation in perpetuity as a Fields in Trust Active Space.

George Best was born on 22 May 1946 in Belfast, the first child of Richard "Dickie" Best (1919–2008) and Anne Withers (1922–1978). He was raised in the Cregagh estate in east Belfast. Best had five siblings: four sisters, Carol, Barbara, Julie, and Grace, and one brother, Ian Busby Best. Best's mother, herself an Irish hockey international, recalled that the boy was able to stand aged ten months and from then on was never seen without a ball at his feet, even taking one to bed. His father was a member of the Orange Order and as a boy George carried the strings of the banner in his local Cregagh lodge. In his autobiography, Best mentioned how important the Order was to his family. The Best family was raised in the Free Presbyterian faith.

In 1957, the academically gifted Best passed the 11-plus and went to Grosvenor High School, but he soon played truant as the school specialised in rugby union. Best then moved to Lisnasharragh Secondary School, reuniting him with friends from primary school and allowing him to focus on football. He played for Cregagh Boys Club. He grew up supporting Glentoran and Wolverhampton Wanderers.

Anne Best died from alcoholism-related cardiovascular disease in 1978, at the age of 55. Best's father died on 16 April 2008, 3 years after George's death, at the age of 88, in the Ulster Hospital in Dundonald, Northern Ireland.

== Club career ==
=== Manchester United ===
At the age of 15, Best was discovered in Belfast by Manchester United scout Bob Bishop, whose telegram to United manager Matt Busby read: "I think I've found you a genius." His local club Glentoran had previously rejected him for being "too small and light". Best was subsequently given a trial and signed up by United's chief scout Joe Armstrong. His first time moving to the club, Best quickly became homesick and stayed for only two days before going back home to Northern Ireland. He returned to Manchester and spent two years as an amateur, as English clubs were not allowed to take Northern Irish players on as apprentices. He was given a job as an errand boy on the Manchester Ship Canal, allowing him to train with the club twice a week.

Best made his First Division debut, aged 17, on 14 September 1963 against West Bromwich Albion at Old Trafford in a 1–0 victory. He then dropped back into the reserves, before scoring his first goal for the first team in his second appearance in a 5–1 win over Burnley on 28 December. Manager Matt Busby then kept Best in the team; by the end of the 1963–64 season, he had made 26 appearances, scoring six goals. Manchester United finished second, four points behind Liverpool.

They reached the semi-finals of the FA Cup, where a defeat to West Ham United cost Best the chance to break a record. In the final Preston North End's Howard Kendall became the youngest ever player in a FA Cup Final – he shared the same birth date as Best. That same season, Best captained the Manchester United side that won the 1964 FA Youth Cup, the sixth FA Youth Cup won under the management of Jimmy Murphy and the first since the 1958 Munich air disaster.

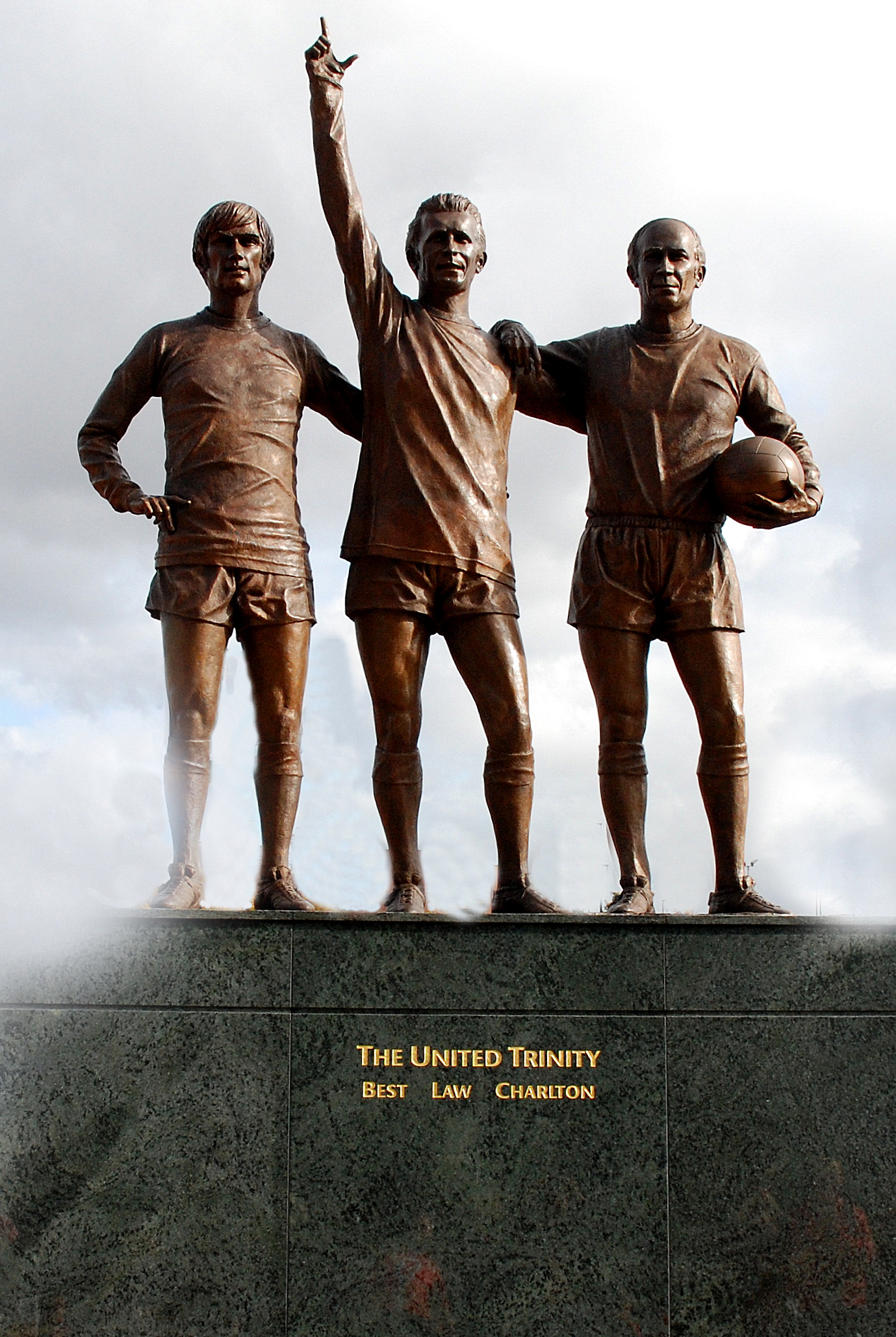
The United Trinity statue of Best (left), Denis Law (centre) and Bobby Charlton (right) outside Old Trafford

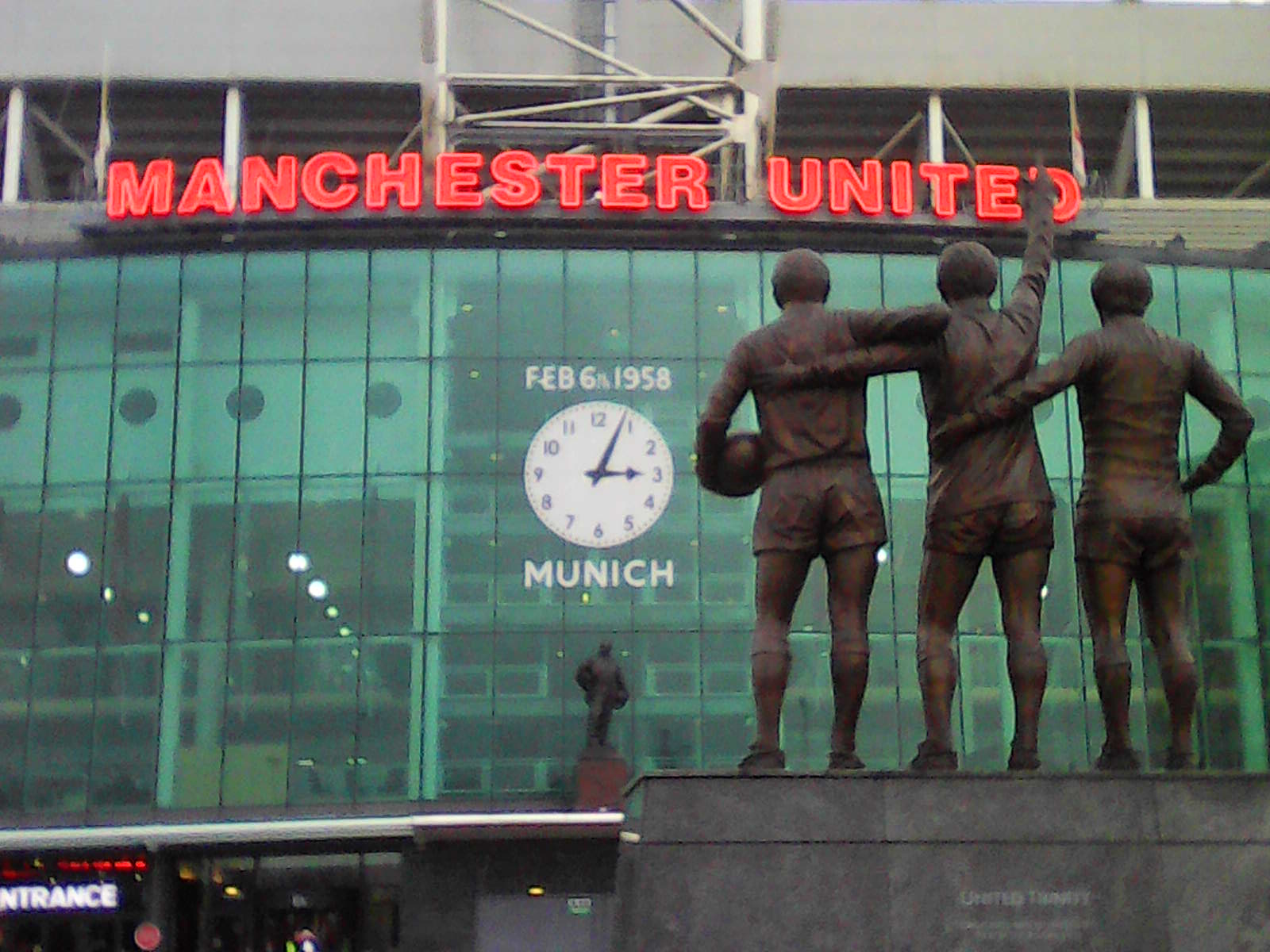
Rear view looking towards the stadium

Though opponents would often use rough play to try to stifle his technical ability, Busby ensured that "fierce, sometimes brutal" training sessions left Best well used to coping with tough challenges. In the 1964–65 season, his first full season as a first team regular, Best helped Manchester United to claim the league title. A 1–0 victory at Elland Road proved decisive as the title race came down to goal average between the "Red Devils" and bitter rivals Leeds United. Leeds managed to gain some measure of revenge though, by knocking Manchester United out of the FA Cup at the semi-final stage. Over the course of the campaign Best contributed 14 goals in 59 competitive games. He scored the opening goal of the 1965 FA Charity Shield at Old Trafford, which ended in a 2–2 draw with Liverpool.

The rising star of English football, Best was catapulted to superstar status at the age of 19, when he scored two goals in a European Cup quarter-final match against Benfica at the Estádio da Luz on 9 March 1966. His impressive stand-out display allied with his dark Beatle mop-top hair, the Portuguese media dubbed him "O Quinto Beatle" ("the fifth Beatle"); on the team's return to England, Best was photographed on the airport tarmac in his new sombrero with the headline, "El Beatle". His talent and showmanship made him a crowd and media favourite and he went from being headline news in the back pages to the front pages.

Before the game, manager Matt Busby had told his wingers, Best and Connelly, to stay deep for the first 20 minutes. Keep it tight and quieten the crowd. But George Best was only 19, too young for such caution. All he heard was 'blah, blah, blah'. When the game started, he grabbed it by the scruff. 'Watch this, Eusebio. And Coluna, Simoes, Torres, Germano, Jose Augusto. I'm George Best, and this is how it's done.'

— 'El Beatle' arrives, Jon Carter for ESPN.

Other nicknames included the "Belfast Boy", while he was often referred to as "Geordie" in his native Belfast and "Georgie" in England. However United failed to win any major honours in the 1965–66 season. Best was injured from 26 March onwards, with a twisted knee following a bad tackle from a Preston North End player. United staff claimed it was light ligament damage, to keep Best on the field for the rest of the campaign. He had little faith in the United medical staff and so he secretly saw Glentoran's physiotherapist, who readjusted his ligaments in a painful procedure. His last game of the season, his knee strapped-up, came on 13 April, a 2–0 defeat to Partizan Belgrade at Partizan Stadium.

The 1966–67 season was again successful, as Manchester United claimed the league title by four points. Best stated that "if the championship was decided on home games we would win it every season. This time our away games made the difference. We got into the right frame of mind." An ever-present all season long, he scored 10 goals in 45 games. He then helped the "Red Devils" to share the Charity Shield with a 3–3 draw with FA Cup winners Tottenham Hotspur. It was the first game to be broadcast in colour on British television.

Best scored twice against rivals Liverpool in a 2–0 win at Anfield and claimed a hat-trick against Newcastle United in a 6–0 home win on the penultimate league game of the season. However a home defeat to local rivals Manchester City proved costly, as City claimed the league title with a two-point lead over United. Yet the 1967–68 season was remembered by United fans for the European Cup win. After disposing of Maltese Hibernians, United advanced past Yugoslavian Sarajevo with a 2–1 home win. Best assisted John Aston for the first and scored the second himself and was described by Geoffrey Green of The Times as "the centrepiece of the chessboard ... a player full of fantasy; a player who lent magic to what might have been whimsy".

In the quarter-finals, United advanced past Polish club Górnik Zabrze 2–1 on aggregate, having held on to their aggregate lead in freezing temperatures in front of 105,000 at Silesian Stadium. Despite losing the away tie 1–0, Best described the defeat as "one of our best-ever performances, given all the unwelcome circumstances". Facing six times champions Real Madrid in the semi-finals, Best scored the only goal of the home fixture with a 15-yard strike that Alex Stepney described as one of Best's finest goals. In the tie at the Bernabéu, Best was marked effectively by Manuel Sanchís Martínez, but on the one time Best got the better of him he made a telling pass to Bill Foulkes, who calmly found the net, to level the game at 3–3 and to win the aggregate tie 4–3.

Days after returning to England, as the First Division's joint top-scorer, level on 28 goals with Southampton's Ron Davies, Best was presented with the FWA Footballer of the Year award, becoming the youngest ever recipient. Facing United in the European Cup Final at Wembley were Benfica. While his teammates rested, Best found "a novel way to relax" before the big game by sleeping with "a particular young lady called Sue". The game went into extra-time and, just after three minutes, Best went on a mazy run and beat goalkeeper José Henrique with a dummy before rolling the ball into the net with his left foot. Two further goals from Brian Kidd and Bobby Charlton settled the tie at 4–1. The victory was not only the pinnacle of Best's career, but arguably Manchester United's greatest achievement, considering the Munich air disaster had wiped out most of the Busby Babes just ten years previously. Best also won the Ballon d'Or in 1968 after receiving more votes than Bobby Charlton, Dragan Džajić and Franz Beckenbauer. This meant that he had won the three major honours in club football at the age of just 22: the league title, European Cup and European Player of the Year award. After this, a steady decline began.

"It seems impossible to hurt him. All manner of men have tried to intimidate him. Best merely glides along, riding tackles and brushing giants aside like leaves."

— Joe Mercer, Manchester City manager, 1969.

The "Holy Trinity" of Best, Law and Charlton were still as effective as ever in the 1968–69 campaign. Although, it became obvious that the club's new recruits were not up to scratch as United dropped to 11th in the league before Busby announced his retirement. Best later said that "I increasingly had the feeling that I was carrying the team at times on the pitch." He scored 22 goals in 55 games, though only he and Denis Law scored more than six league goals. In the Intercontinental Cup, fans and players alike looked forward to seeing United take on Argentine opposition Estudiantes de La Plata over the course of two legs. However Best said "no one tackled harder or dirtier than this Argentinian team" as a 1–0 defeat at the Estadio Camilo Cichero was followed by a 1–1 draw at Old Trafford. In the home tie, Best was kicked and spat on by José Hugo Medina and both players were sent off after Best reacted with a punch. Despite their poor league form, Manchester United reached the semi-finals of the European Cup: they had a relatively easy run in getting past Ireland's Waterford United, Belgium's Anderlecht and Austria's Rapid Wien), but were knocked out 2–1 on aggregate by A.C. Milan following a 2–0 defeat at the San Siro.

"It's been a joke on the circuit ever since. You know, I'm on one side of the street, George Best is on the other. He nods to me and I dive under a bus."

— Northampton goalkeeper Kim Book on the jibes he has faced since being fooled by Best's feint in a 1970 FA Cup game against Manchester United. Best's six goal performance in the game was voted No. 26 on Channel 4's list of the 100 Greatest Sporting Moments.

United improved slightly under new boss Wilf McGuinness, but still only managed an eighth-place finish in the 1969–70 season. Best hit 23 goals, including an FA Cup record six goals in an 8–2 win over Northampton Town in a mud-bath at the County Ground on 7 February 1970. Best's sixth goal saw him go one on one with Northampton goalkeeper Kim Book. Best made a feint to go right which put Book on his backside, before he went left and walked the ball into the net. Book states:

I remember thinking George was going to go one way, but he dropped his shoulder and went the other, and by then I was already on the deck. He was just too good for me.

Best's six goal performance earned him an invitation to No 10 Downing Street from UK Prime Minister Harold Wilson, who had also regularly written fan letters to him. In 2002 the British public voted Best's record breaking performance No. 26 in the list of the 100 Greatest Sporting Moments. Busby returned as manager in December 1970, though the 1970–71 season also ended without a trophy. Best began to get into trouble with his discipline: he was fined by the Football Association for receiving three bookings for misconduct and was suspended by United for two weeks after missing his train to Stamford Bridge so as to spend a weekend with actress Sinéad Cusack.

New manager Frank O'Farrell led United to an 8th-place finish in 1971–72. Highlights for Best included hat-tricks against West Ham United and Southampton, as well as a goal against Sheffield United that came after he beat four defenders in a mazy run. However, he was also sent off against Chelsea, was the subject of death threats and failed to turn up for training for a whole week in January. Instead, he spent his time with Miss Great Britain 1971, Carolyn Moore. On 17 November, he was the subject of the biographical television show This Is Your Life, when he was surprised by Eamonn Andrews at a central London restaurant. He would be the subject for a second time in 2003 when Michael Aspel surprised him at Teddington Studios. With 27 goals in 54 appearances, Best finished as the club's top-scorer for the sixth – and final – consecutive season. Best then announced his retirement from football, but nevertheless turned up for pre-season training and continued to play.

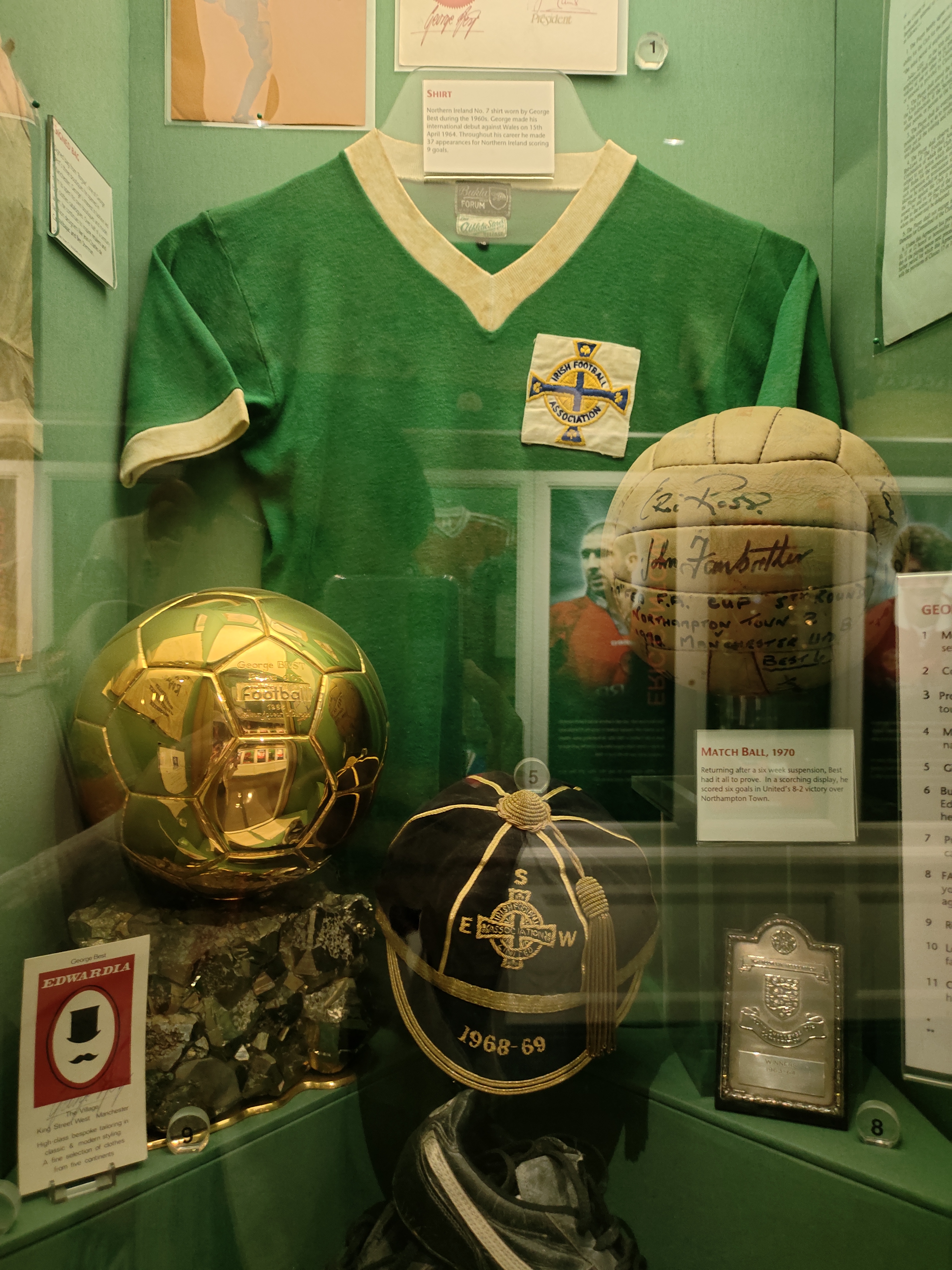
George Best memorabilia at the Manchester United museum at Old Trafford

United's decline continued in the 1972–73 season, as Best was part of the 'old guard clique' that barely talked to the newer, less talented players. Frustrated with the club's decline, Best went missing in December to party at the London nightclubs. He was suspended and transfer-listed at a value of £300,000. After O'Farrell was replaced as manager by Tommy Docherty, Best announced his retirement for a second time. He resumed training on 27 April.

Best's last competitive game for the club was on 1 January 1974 against Queens Park Rangers at Loftus Road, which United lost 3–0. He failed to turn up for training three days later and was dropped by Docherty, though he claimed Docherty was deceitful with him. Best was arrested and charged with stealing a fur coat, passport and cheque book from Marjorie Wallace, but was later cleared of all charges. United went on to suffer relegation into the Second Division in 1973–74.

Best played at United when shirt numbers were assigned to a position and not the player. When Best played at right wing, he donned the number 7. As a left winger, where he played exclusively in his debut season and nearly all of the 1971–72 campaign, he wore the number 11. Best wore the number 8 shirt at inside right on occasion throughout the 1960s, but for more than half of his matches during 1970–71. He was playing at inside left (wearing the number 10) in 1972 when he famously walked out on United the first time but was back in the number 11 for the autumn of 1973 before leaving for good. Best even wore the number 9 jersey once for United, with Bobby Charlton injured, on 22 March 1969 at Old Trafford, scoring the only goal in a 1–0 win over Sheffield Wednesday. In total Best made 474 appearances for Manchester United in all competitions from 1963 to 1974 and scored 181 goals. Over the next decade he went into an increasingly rapid decline, drifting between several clubs, including spells in South Africa, the Republic of Ireland, the United States, Scotland and Australia.

=== Later years ===
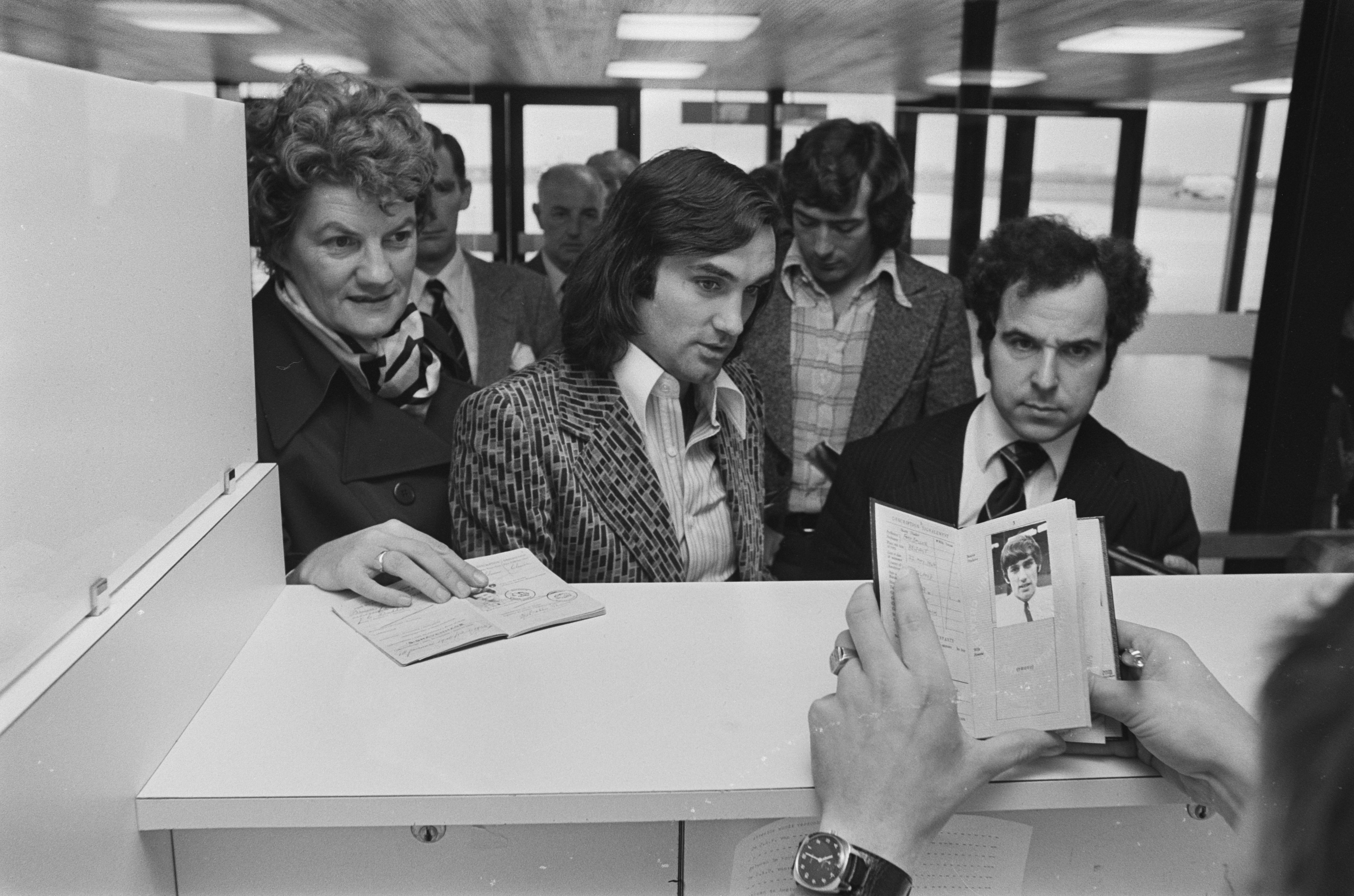
Best (middle) in Rotterdam, the Netherlands, October 1976

Playing only five competitive matches for Jewish Guild in South Africa, Best endured criticism for missing several training sessions. During his short time there, he was the main draw attracting thousands of spectators to the matches.

In 1975, Best played three matches for Stockport County in the Fourth Division. He had a brief spell at Cork Celtic from December 1975 to January 1976. He made his League of Ireland debut against Drogheda United at Flower Lodge on 28 December. He played only three league games, the others against Bohemians and Shelbourne, but despite attracting big crowds he failed to score or impress. Being on a rolling contract with Cork his failure to show for a game saw him being dropped and subsequently leaving the club.

He had a brief resurgence in form with Second Division club Fulham from 1976–78, showing that, although he had lost some of his pace, he retained his skills. His time with the "Cottagers" is particularly remembered for a match against Hereford United on 25 September 1976 in which he jokingly tackled his own teammate and drinking mate, Rodney Marsh. Best and Marsh were drawn to the club by the presence of England World Cup-winning captain Bobby Moore, and they were involved in exuberant goal celebrations.

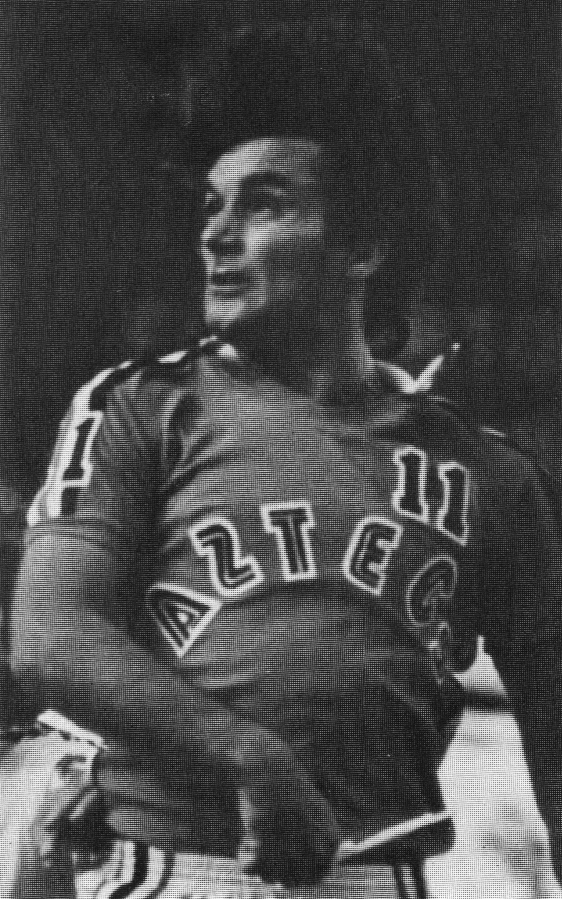
Best with the Los Angeles Aztecs circa 1978

Best played for three clubs in the United States: Los Angeles Aztecs, Fort Lauderdale Strikers and later San Jose Earthquakes; he also played for the Detroit Express on a European tour. Best was a success on the field, scoring 15 goals in 24 games in his first season with the Aztecs and named as the NASL's best midfielder in his second. He and manager Ken Adam opened "Bestie's Beach Club" (now called "The Underground" after the London subway system) in Hermosa Beach, California in the 1970s, and continued to operate it until the 1990s.

Best caused a stir when he returned to the UK to play for the Scottish club Hibernian. The club was suffering a decline in fortunes and was heading for relegation from the Premier Division, before Best was signed on a "pay per play" basis after the club chairman, Tom Hart, received a tip-off from an Edinburgh Evening News reporter that he was available. Even though Best failed to save Hibs from relegation, gates increased dramatically and the attendance quadrupled for his first match at Easter Road. One infamous incident saw Best initially sacked by Hibs after he went on a massive drinking session with the French rugby team, who were in Edinburgh to play Scotland. He was brought back a week later. In August 1982, he played 20 minutes for Scone Thistle against Scone Amateurs; the appearance fee he received helped to pay off an income tax bill.

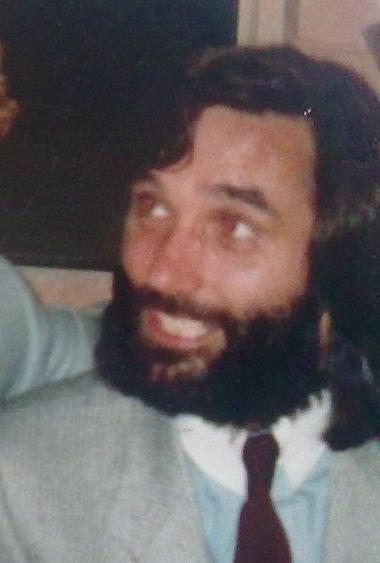
Best in Hong Kong in 1982

He returned to the US to play for the San Jose Earthquakes in what was officially described as a "loan", though he only managed a handful of appearances for Hibs in the First Division in the following season. He returned one last time to Easter Road in 1984, for Jackie McNamara's testimonial match against Newcastle United. In his third season in the States, Best scored once in 12 appearances. His moves to Fort Lauderdale and San Jose were also unhappy, as his off-field demons began to take control of his life again. After failing to agree terms with Bolton Wanderers in 1981, he was invited as a guest player and played three matches for two Hong Kong First Division teams (Sea Bee and Rangers) in 1982. At HK Rangers he played alongside his former Northern Ireland teammate Derek Spence. While in Hong Kong, Best also played darts for a team called Presstuds, made up of a combination of professional footballers and sports journalists.

In late 1982, AFC Bournemouth manager Don Megson signed the 36-year-old Best for the Third Division side. He remained there until the end of the 1982–83 season, when he retired from football at the age of 37. Best played in a friendly for Newry Town against Shamrock Rovers in August 1983, before ending his professional career exactly 20 years after joining Manchester United with a brief four-match stint playing for the Brisbane Lions in the Australian National Soccer League during the 1983 season. He also was a guest player in an exhibition match between Dee Why and Manly Warringah held on 27 July 1983; Dee Why lost the match 3–2, though Best did get on the score sheet, scoring the second goal for Dee Why.

On 11 February 1984, Best played one match for Tobermore United, the only club in Northern Ireland that he ever played competitively for. Tobermore lost 7–0 to Ballymena United. On 29 October, Best played as a special guest for Reading against the New Zealand national team in a friendly game, alongside 1966 World Cup winner Martin Peters. Reading were defeated 2–1.

On 8 August 1988, a testimonial match was held for Best at Windsor Park. Among the crowd were Matt Busby, Jimmy Murphy and Bob Bishop, the scout who discovered him. Those playing included Osvaldo Ardiles, Johan Neeskens, Pat Jennings and Liam Brady. Best scored twice, one goal from outside the box, the other from the penalty spot.

== International career ==
"George Best was one of the most talented players of all time and probably the best footballer who never made it to a major world final."

— 1974 World Cup winning West Germany captain Franz Beckenbauer on Best not playing at a World Cup.

Best was capped 37 times for Northern Ireland, scoring nine goals. Of his nine international goals, four were scored against Cyprus and one each against Albania, England, Scotland, Switzerland and Turkey. Largely surrounded by teammates of lesser ability with Northern Ireland than with his club and lower expectations as a result, Best considered his international career as being "recreational football". He is regarded as one of the greatest players never to have played at a World Cup, being "hamstrung in World Cup terms by hailing from a global minnow". His international debut came in a 3–2 win over Wales in Swansea, on 15 April 1964, in the 1963–64 British Home Championship in 1964. He scored his first international goal seven days later, the opening goal in a 2–1 World Cup qualifying defeat to Switzerland in Lausanne.

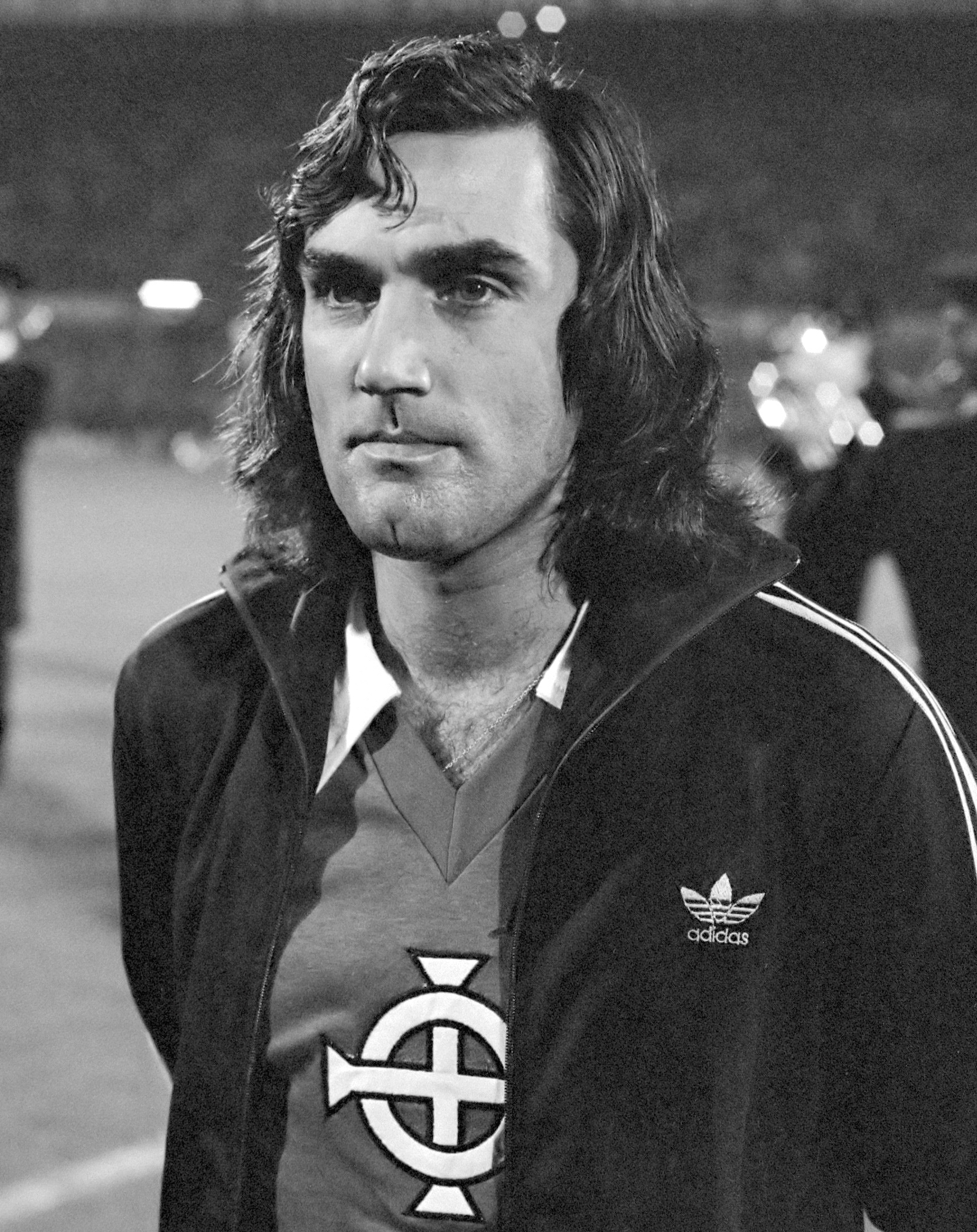
Best with Northern Ireland in 1976

On 15 May 1971, Best scored possibly the most famous "goal" of his career at Windsor Park in Belfast against England. As Gordon Banks, the English goalkeeper, released the ball in the air in order to kick the ball downfield, Best managed to kick the ball first, which sent the ball high over their heads and heading towards the open goal. Best outpaced Banks and headed the ball into the empty goal, but the goal was disallowed by referee Alistair Mackenzie.

Best continued to be selected for Northern Ireland throughout the 1970s, despite his fluctuating form and off field problems. Dutch captain Johan Cruyff commented: "What he [Best] had was unique, you can't coach it". One of Best's most memorable performances came in a 2–2 draw against Netherlands in a World Cup qualifier in Rotterdam on 13 October 1976; during the match, he famously nutmegged Cruyff. His final appearance for Northern Ireland came in the reverse fixture against the Netherlands, at Windsor Park on 12 October of the following year, which ended in a 1–0 defeat.

Best was considered briefly by manager Billy Bingham for the 1982 World Cup, but at the age of 35, with his football skills dulled by age and drink (and five years having passed since his last cap), he was not selected for the Northern Ireland squad. A proponent of a United Ireland football team, in 2005 Best stated: "I've always thought that at any given time both the Republic and Northern Ireland have had some great world class players. I still hope that in my lifetime it happens."

== Style of play ==
A highly skilful winger, considered by several pundits to be one of the greatest dribblers in the history of the sport, Best received plaudits for his playing style, which combined pace, skill, balance, feints, two-footedness, goalscoring and the ability to get past defenders. Pelé declared that Best was the greatest footballer he'd ever seen. Recalling Best's career and style of play, sports writer Patrick Barclay said: "In terms of ability he was the world's best footballer of all time. He could do almost anything – technically, speed, complete mastery of not only the ball but his own body. You could saw his legs away and he still wouldn't fall because his balance was uncanny, almost supernatural. Heading ability, passing ability, I mean it goes without saying the dribbling – he could beat anybody in any way he chose. For fun he'd play a one-two off the opponent's shins."

"People were transfixed, bewitched and delighted by the impish, cheeky skills of Best that invariably brought a smile to all except the defenders who had to face him."

— BBC journalist John May in an article titled, "Was Georgie the Best?".

Although Best was mostly renowned for his dribbling skills, he also drew praise for his ability as a creator; in regard to this ability, Daily Telegraph reader Tony Dove commented: "I only had the opportunity to see George play once in person – Man U played a tour game in Auckland, New Zealand, late in the 60s. His brilliance was simply dazzling – player after player from the New Zealand national team queued up to try to tackle him and he gave them all dancing lessons. I clearly remember one run, starting almost from the goal-line, from a roll-out by Stepney, when he evaded every player in the NZ team, one after the other, until he reached the opposite end of the pitch and produced a perfectly floated centre for Charlton's head. His grace, agility and ball skills were only eclipsed by his unselfish passing – many love to remark on his goal scoring but he was prodigious as the set-up man. On the field you couldn't ask for a better football role-model. Let the man pass with what dignity remains to him. Remember him at his best."

In an interview, Manchester United's Alex Stepney said: "Best would knock the ball on to the goalkeeper's shin, who would be rushing towards this feet to close down the angle, and the ball would bounce back to him and he would score. No one has been able to emulate that in football. Not only did he do it in training but he did it against Manchester United's arch rivals Liverpool at Anfield."

The National Football Museum noted that Best played in an era of muddy pitches and heavy tackling, yet appeared to "glide through opponents" and could play on either wing, as a forward, or behind a central striker. Writing for These Football Times, Jon Townsend highlighted Best's balance, strength on the ball, finishing and ability to slalom through defences, and argued that his game would have translated well to the modern era despite his having played without modern advantages such as sports science, nutrition, manicured pitches and lighter boots. In a 2015 interview, José Mourinho, then manager of Chelsea, named Best as the player from any era he would most like to sign, describing him as "amazing" and "30 years ahead of his time".

== Personal life ==
George Best's voice
from the BBC Radio 4 programme The New Elizabethans, 20 July 2012

During his early years at Old Trafford, Best was a shy teenager who passed his free time in snooker halls. However, he later became known for his long hair, good looks and extravagant celebrity lifestyle, and he appeared on Top of the Pops in 1965.

Although the football pitch was his arena, Best was essentially a pop star—young, stylish, strikingly beautiful, possessed of a creative confidence that bordered on arrogance, and worshipped by young men and women alike. Like The Beatles and The Rolling Stones, he epitomised the first, sudden, dynamic emergence of a postwar youth culture that, for better or worse, would help define the rest of the century. Long before Beckham, he was Britain's first footballer as popular icon.

— Sean O'Hagan in The Guardian on Best's celebrity status in the 1960s.

In 1969 Eva Haraldsted sued him for breach of promise, in the last such prominent case in England. However, the case never reached trial; instead, Haraldsted received a settlement of £500.

Best had a brief relationship with actress Sinéad Cusack in 1971.

He opened a nightclub called Slack Alice on Bootle Street in Manchester in 1973 and owned restaurants in the city including Oscars, on the site of the old Waldorf Hotel. He also owned fashion boutiques, in partnership with Manchester City player Mike Summerbee. Best's cousin, Gary Reid, a member of the Ulster Defence Association, was killed in 1974 during an episode of serious rioting in east Belfast.

"In 1969 I gave up women and alcohol—it was the worst 20 minutes of my life."

— Best quips on his lifestyle.

Best married Angela MacDonald-Janes on 24 January 1978 at Candlelight Wedding Chapel in Las Vegas, having met her in the United States when Best was playing for the Los Angeles Aztecs in 1976. Their son, Calum, was born in 1981. They separated in 1982 and divorced in 1986.

"If I had to choose between dribbling past five players and scoring from 40 yards at Anfield or shagging Miss World, it'd be a hard choice. Thankfully, I've done both."

— Best on life on and off the field.

He married Alex Pursey in 1995 in Kensington and Chelsea, London. They divorced in 2004 with no children. In 2004, she alleged that Best was violent towards her at times during their marriage, an issue that was covered in Best's authorised 1998 biography Bestie in which Alex claimed that Best punched her in the face on more than one occasion. Earlier in the book it is revealed that he struck another of his girlfriends at least once and was arrested and charged with assault on a waitress, Stevie Sloniecka, in November 1972, when he fractured her nose in Reuben's nightclub, Manchester. He was successfully defended when the case reached court in January 1973 by barrister George Carman QC, a close drinking companion of Best, as acknowledged in his book, Scoring at Half Time.

At the peak of his career in the late 1960s and early 1970s, Best advertised Cookstown sausages on television with the phrase "the Best family sausages". In 2007 a memorial plaque was placed outside the pork factory in the County Tyrone town. In the early 1970s, Best also advertised eggs, under the campaign "E for B and Georgie Best", both in print and on TV, where "E for B" was short for "Eggs for Breakfast".

Best had a cameo as himself in the 1971 British comedy film Percy. In 1984, he made a fitness album with Mary Stävin called Shape Up and Dance. The Farm's video for their 1992 cover version of The Human League's "Don't You Want Me" featured Best mouthing the chorus. A biographical film entitled Best was released in May 2000, with John Lynch portraying George Best. Indie rock band The Wedding Present named their first album George Best and featured him on the cover wearing his red Manchester United kit. After his death, Brian Kennedy and Peter Corry released a single entitled George Best – A Tribute. Best features in EA Sports' FIFA video game series; he was included as an icon in the FIFA 19 Ultimate Team Legends.

In 2007, GQ magazine named him as one of the 50 most stylish men of the past 50 years. When Best played football, salaries were a fraction of what top players earn today, but, with his pop star image and celebrity status, Best still earned a fortune. He lost almost all of it. When asked what happened to the money he had earned, Best quipped: "I spent a lot of money on booze, birds (women) and fast cars. The rest I just squandered."

In 2012, Best was featured in the list of The New Elizabethans to mark the diamond Jubilee of Queen Elizabeth II. A panel of seven academics, journalists and historians named Best among the group of people in the UK "whose actions during the reign of Elizabeth II have had a significant impact on lives in these islands and given the age its character".

=== Alcoholism ===
"I was born with a great gift, and sometimes with that comes a destructive streak. Just as I wanted to outdo everyone when I played, I had to outdo everyone when we were out on the town."

— Best on his excesses off the field.

Best suffered from alcoholism for most of his adult life, leading to numerous controversies and, eventually, his death. In 1981, while playing in the United States, Best stole from a woman by taking money from her handbag to fund a drinking session. He recalled the incident, "We were sitting in a bar on the beach, and when she got up to go to the toilet I leaned over and took all the money she had in her bag."

In 1984, Best received a three-month prison sentence for drunk driving, assaulting a police officer and failing to answer bail. He spent Christmas 1984 at Ford Open Prison. Contrary to popular belief and urban legend, he never played football for the prison team. In September 1990, Best appeared on the primetime BBC1 chat show Wogan in which he was heavily drunk and swore, at one point saying to the host, "Terry, I like screwing". In 2002, he told The Guardian: "I was ill and everyone could see it but me."

=== Liver transplant and controversy ===
Best was diagnosed with severe liver damage in March 2000. His liver was said to be functioning at only 20%. In 2001, he was admitted to hospital with pneumonia. At the end of July and start of August 2002, he had a successful liver transplant at the private Cromwell Hospital in London. He haemorrhaged so badly during the operation that he nearly died. The transplant was performed at public expense on the NHS, a decision which was controversial due to Best's alcoholism. The controversy was reignited in 2003 when he was spotted openly drinking white wine spritzers. On 2 February 2004, Best was convicted of another drink-driving offence and banned from driving for 20 months.

== Death ==
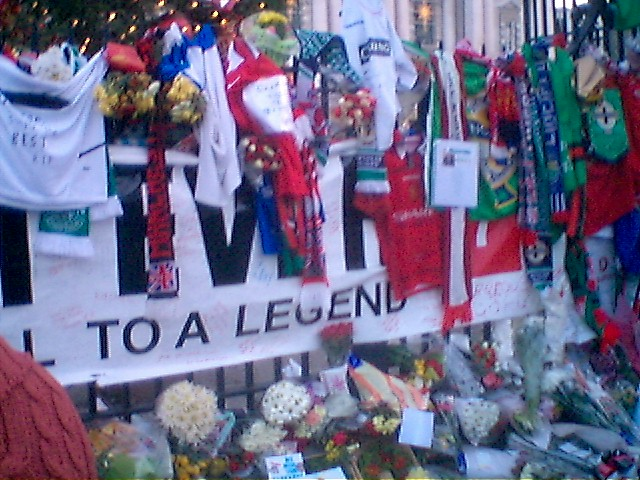
Gates of Belfast City Hall soon after Best's death, Another view.

Best continued to drink after his liver transplant, and was sometimes seen at his local pub in Surbiton, London. On 3 October 2005, he was admitted to intensive care at the private Cromwell Hospital in London, suffering from a kidney infection caused by the side effects of immuno-suppressive drugs used to prevent his body from rejecting his transplanted liver. On 27 October, newspapers stated that Best was close to death and had sent a farewell message to his loved ones. Close friends in the game visited his bedside to make their farewells, including Rodney Marsh, Bobby Charlton and Denis Law.

On 20 November, the tabloid News of the World published a picture of Best, at his own request, showing him in his hospital bed with jaundice, along with a warning about the dangers of alcohol with his message: 'Don't die like me'. In the early hours of 25 November 2005, treatment was stopped; later that day he died, aged 59, as a result of a lung infection and multiple organ failure.

=== Tributes ===
Tributes were paid to Best from around the world, including from arguably three of the greatest football players ever, Pelé, Diego Maradona and Johan Cruyff. British prime minister Tony Blair described him as "probably the most naturally gifted footballer of his generation, one of the greatest footballers the UK has ever produced". Maradona commented: "George inspired me when I was young. He was flamboyant and exciting and able to inspire his teammates. I actually think we were very similar players – dribblers who were able to create moments of magic." Fellow Manchester United legend Eric Cantona also paid tribute, saying: "I would love him to save me a place in his team, George Best that is, not God." At Best's funeral, the Duke of York sent white roses bearing a message which described him as "an inspirational footballer from Northern Ireland whose skills captured the imagination of fans from around the world".

The Premier League announced that a minute's silence would be observed before all Premier League games to be held over the weekend of his death; however, at many grounds a minute's applause broke out in his honour. The first match at Old Trafford after Best's death was a League Cup tie against West Bromwich Albion, the club against which he made his debut for Manchester United in 1963. The match, which United won, was preceded by tributes from former teammate Bobby Charlton. Best's son, Calum, former teammates and surviving members from the West Brom team which he played against in his debut all joined the current United squad on the pitch for a minute's silence. During this, fans in every seat held aloft pictures of Best, which were given out before the match.

=== Funeral ===
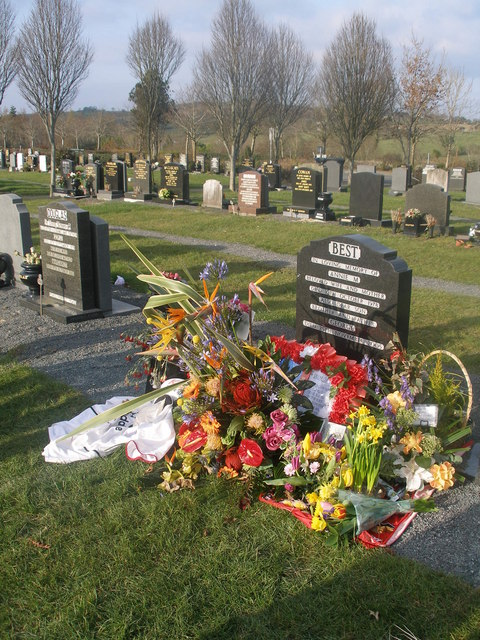
The Best family grave at Roselawn Cemetery, overlooking east Belfast

His body left the family home at Cregagh Road, East Belfast, shortly after 10 am on Saturday 3 December 2005. The cortege then travelled the short distance to Stormont. The route was lined with around 100,000 mourners. Former Northern Ireland manager Billy Bingham, international teammates Derek Dougan, Peter McParland, Harry Gregg and Gerry Armstrong and Denis Law were the first to carry the coffin to the base of the Stormont steps.

There was an 11 am service in the Grand Hall attended by 300 invited guests relayed to around 25,000 mourners inside the grounds of Stormont. Best's brother Ian, agent Phil Hughes, Dr Akeel Alisa, who treated Best, and his brothers-in-law Norman McNarry and Alan McPherson, were also pallbearers. As the cortege left Stormont, the Gilnahirk pipe band played. The funeral was live on several television stations, including BBC One. Afterwards, Best was interred beside his mother, Annie Mary Best, in a private ceremony at the hill-top Roselawn Cemetery, overlooking east Belfast.

=== Memorials ===
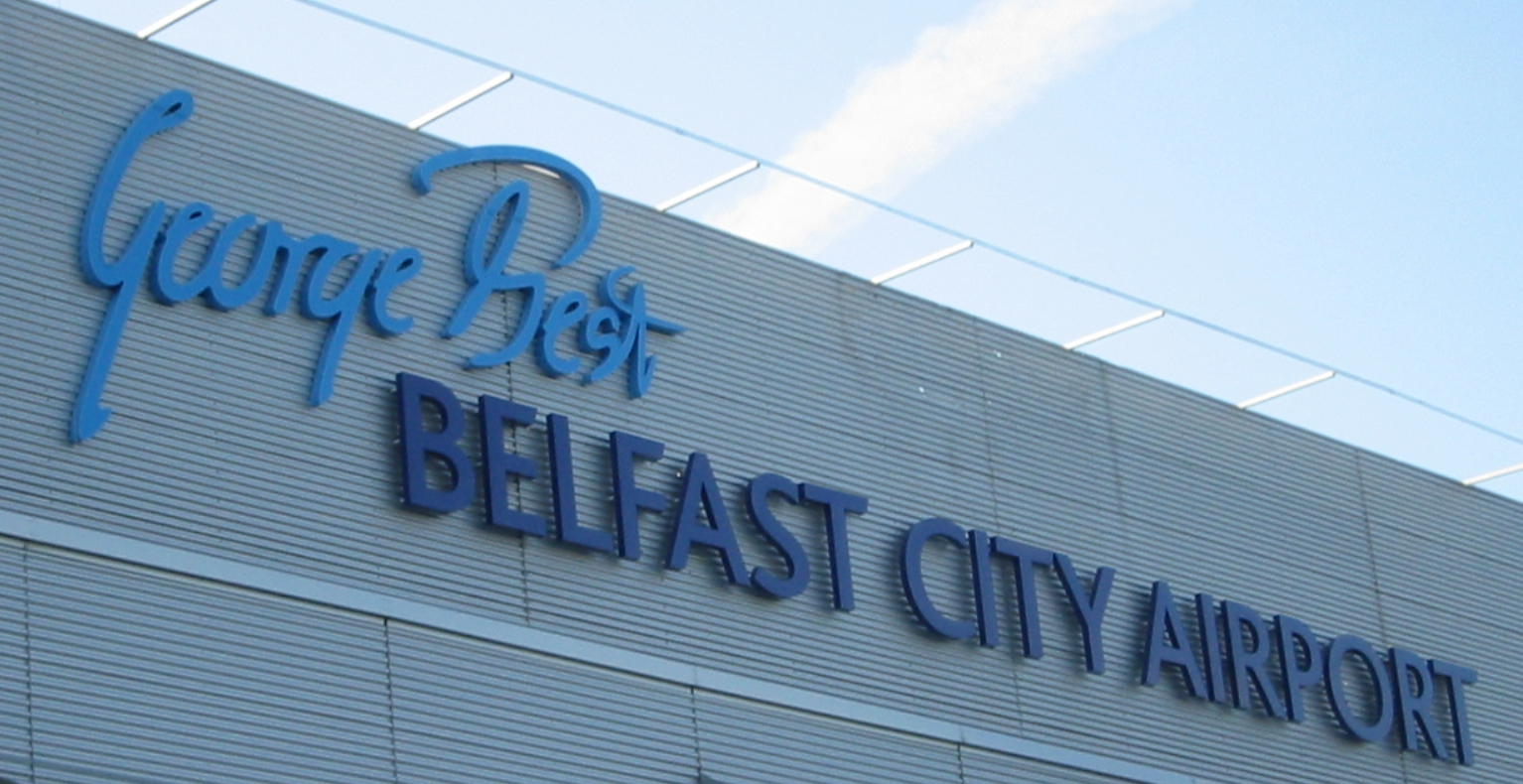
Following his death, the George Best Belfast City Airport was named after him

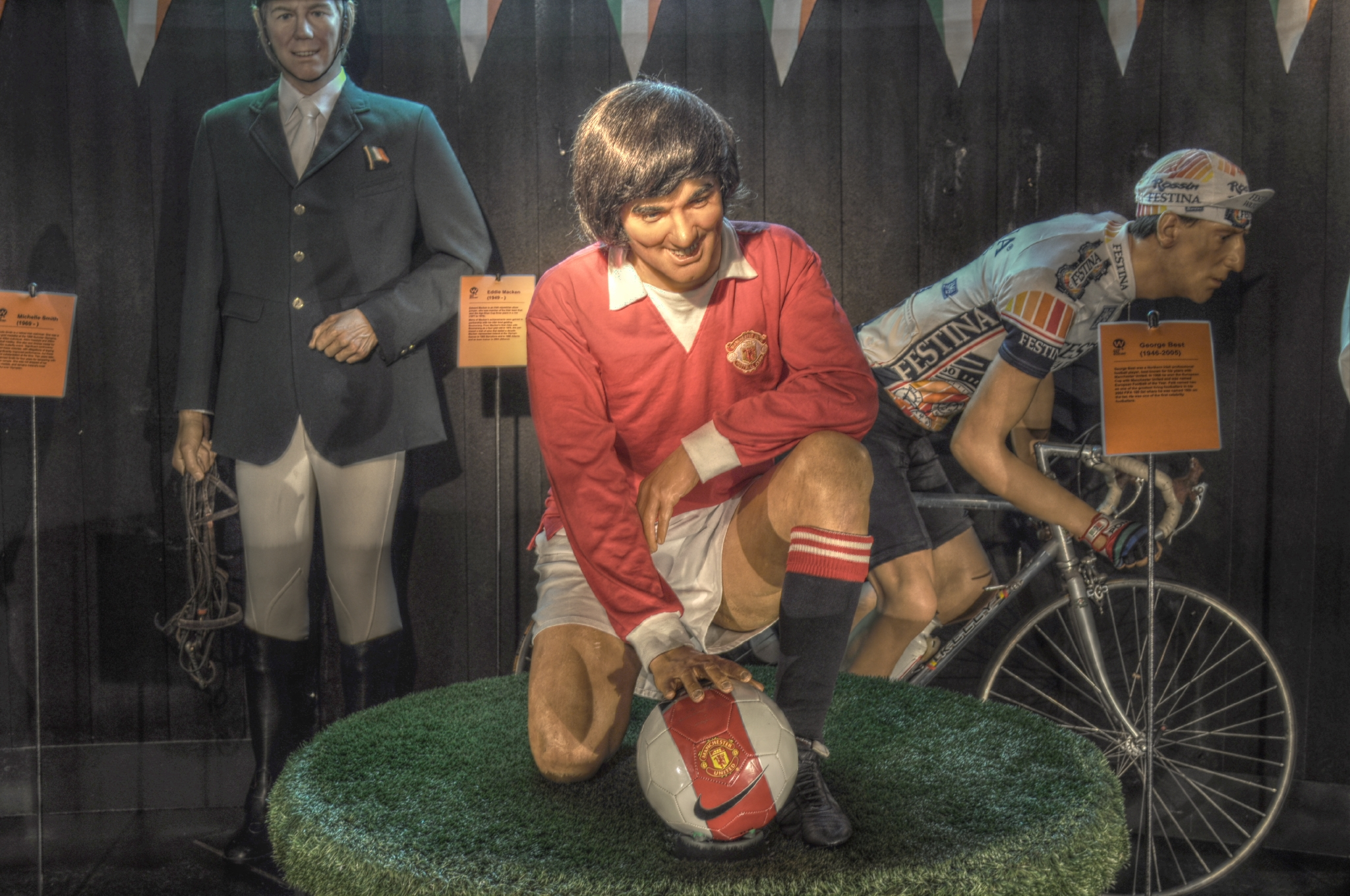
George Best waxwork in Malahide, Dublin

Belfast City Airport was renamed George Best Belfast City Airport as a tribute to Best. The official new name and signage was unveiled to a gathering of the Best family and friends at the airport on 22 May 2006, which would have been his 60th birthday. Public opinion in Northern Ireland about the renaming of the airport was divided, with one poll showing 52% in favour and 48% against. Democratic Unionist Party (DUP) deputy leader and East Belfast Member of Parliament Peter Robinson, in whose constituency Belfast City airport is situated, stated that his preference was a sports stadium be named after Best.

"With feet as sensitive as a pickpocket's hands, his control of the ball under the most violent pressure was astonishing. The bewildering repertoire of feints and swerves... and balance that would have made Isaac Newton decide he might as well have eaten the apple."

— Sports writer Hugh McIlvanney.

In March 2006, the airline Flybe named a Dash 8 (Q400) plane The George Best. The aircraft was later used to carry Best's family across to the Manchester memorial service for Best.

In June 2006, Sarah Fabergé, great-granddaughter of Russian imperial jeweller Peter Carl Fabergé, was commissioned to create the George Best Egg, in tribute. A limited edition of 68 eggs were produced, with all profits from the sale of the eggs going to the George Best Foundation, which promotes health through sport and supports people with alcohol and drug problems. The first egg is on display at the George Best Airport. For the first anniversary of his death, Ulster Bank issued 1 million commemorative £5 notes. The notes sold out in five days. The notes sold on the online auction site eBay for up to £30.

In December 2006, the George Best Memorial Trust launched a fund-raising drive to raise £200,000 in subscriptions to pay for a life-size bronze sculpture of George Best. By 2008 the money had still not been raised until a local developer, Doug Elliott, announced on 29 January 2008, that he would put up the rest of the money and would manage delivery of the project.

== Career statistics ==
=== Club ===
Appearances and goals by club, season and competition
Club	Season	League			Cup		League Cup		Continental		Other		Total	
Club	Season	Division	Apps	Goals	Apps	Goals	Apps	Goals	Apps	Goals	Apps	Goals	Apps	Goals
Manchester United	1963–64	First Division	17	4	7	2	—		2	0	0	0	26	6
Manchester United	1964–65	First Division	41	10	7	2	—		11	2	0	0	59	14
Manchester United	1965–66	First Division	31	9	5	3	—		6	4	1 (Note: Appearance in 1965 FA Charity Shield)	1	43	17
Manchester United	1966–67	First Division	42	10	2	0	1	0	—		0	0	45	10
Manchester United	1967–68	First Division	41	28	2	1	—		9	3	1 (Note: Appearance in 1967 FA Charity Shield)	0	53	32
Manchester United	1968–69	First Division	41	19	6	1	—		6	2	2 (Note: Appearances in 1968 Intercontinental Cup)	0	55	22
Manchester United	1969–70	First Division	37	15	8	6	8	2	—		0	0	53	23
Manchester United	1970–71	First Division	40	18	2	1	6	2	—		(Note: Appearances in Watney Cup)3	1	51	22
Manchester United	1971–72	First Division	40	18	7	5	6	3	—		1 (Note: Appearance in Watney Cup)	1	54	27
Manchester United	1972–73	First Division	19	4	0	0	4	2	—		0	0	23	6
Manchester United	1973–74	First Division	12	2	0	0	0	0	—		0	0	12	2
Manchester United	Total		361	137	46	21	25	9	34	11	8	3	474	181
Dunstable Town	1974–75	SL Division One North	0	0	0	0	0	0	—		—		0	0
Stockport County	1975–76	Fourth Division	3	2	0	0	0	0	—		—		3	2
Cork Celtic	1975–76	League of Ireland	3	0	0	0	0	0	—		—		3	0
Los Angeles Aztecs	1976	North American Soccer League	23	15	—		—		—		1 (Note: Appearance(s) in NASL play-offs)	0	24	15
Fulham	1976–77	Second Division	32	6	2	0	3	2	—		—		37	8
Fulham	1977–78	Second Division	10	2	0	0	0	0	—		—		10	2
Fulham	Total		42	8	2	0	3	2	—		—		47	10
Los Angeles Aztecs	1977	North American Soccer League	20	11	—		—		—		5	2	25	13
Los Angeles Aztecs	1978	North American Soccer League	12	1	—		—		—		—		12	1
Los Angeles Aztecs	Total		32	12	—		—		—		5	2	37	14
Fort Lauderdale Strikers	1978	North American Soccer League	9	4	—		—		—		5	1	14	5
Fort Lauderdale Strikers	1979	North American Soccer League	19	2	—		—		—		—		19	2
Fort Lauderdale Strikers	Total		28	6	—		—		—		5	1	33	7
Hibernian	1979–80	Scottish Premier Division	13	3	3	0	0	0	—		—		16	3
Hibernian	1980–81	Scottish First Division	4	0	0	0	2	0	—		—		6	0
Hibernian	Total		17	3	3	0	2	0	—		—		22	3
San Jose Earthquakes	1980	North American Soccer League	26	8	—		—		—		—		26	8
San Jose Earthquakes	1981	North American Soccer League	30	13	—		—		—		—		30	13
San Jose Earthquakes	Total		56	21	—		—		—		—		56	21
AFC Bournemouth	1982–83	Third Division	5	0	0	0	0	0	—		—		5	0
Brisbane Lions	1983	National Soccer League	4	0	0	0	—		—		—		4	0
Career total			574	204	52	21	30	11	34	11	19	6	705	251

=== International ===
Appearances and goals by national team and year
National team	Year	Apps	Goals
Northern Ireland	1964	6	2
Northern Ireland	1965	6	1
Northern Ireland	1966	1	0
Northern Ireland	1967	1	0
Northern Ireland	1968	1	1
Northern Ireland	1969	4	0
Northern Ireland	1970	4	1
Northern Ireland	1971	6	4
Northern Ireland	1972	2	0
Northern Ireland	1973	1	0
Northern Ireland	1974	0	0
Northern Ireland	1975	0	0
Northern Ireland	1976	2	0
Northern Ireland	1977	3	0
Total		37	9

Scores and results list Northern Ireland's goal tally first, score column indicates score after each Best goal.

List of international goals scored by George Best
No.	Date	Venue	Opponent	Score	Result	Competition
1	14 November 1964	Stade Olympique de la Pontaise, Lausanne, Switzerland	Switzerland	1–0	1–2	1966 FIFA World Cup qualification
2	25 November 1964	Hampden Park, Glasgow, Scotland	Scotland	1–0	2–3	1964–65 British Home Championship
3	7 May 1965	Windsor Park, Belfast, Northern Ireland	Albania	4–1	4–1	1966 FIFA World Cup qualification
4	23 October 1968	Windsor Park, Belfast, Northern Ireland	Turkey	1–1	4–1	1970 FIFA World Cup qualification
5	21 April 1970	Wembley Stadium, London, England	England	1–1	1–3	1969–70 British Home Championship
6	3 February 1971	GSP Stadium, Nicosia, Cyprus	Cyprus	3–0	3–0	UEFA Euro 1972 qualification
7	21 April 1971	Windsor Park, Belfast, Northern Ireland	Cyprus	2–0	5–0	UEFA Euro 1972 qualification
8	21 April 1971	Windsor Park, Belfast, Northern Ireland	Cyprus	3–0	5–0	UEFA Euro 1972 qualification
9	21 April 1971	Windsor Park, Belfast, Northern Ireland	Cyprus	4–0	5–0	UEFA Euro 1972 qualification

== Honours ==
Manchester United

- Football League First Division: 1964–65, 1966–67
- Charity Shield: 1965, 1967
- European Cup: 1968

Hibernian

- East of Scotland Shield: 1979–80

Northern Ireland

- British Home Championship: 1964

Individual

- Football League First Division top scorer: 1967–68
- FWA Footballer of the Year: 1967–68
- Ballon d'Or: 1968; third place 1971
- FA Cup top scorer: 1971–72
- FUWO European Team of the Season: 1968, 1969
- Rothmans Golden Boots Awards: 1970, 1971
- Sport Ideal European XI: 1971
- PFA Team of the Year Second Division: 1977
- Football League 100 Legends: 1998
- Honorary doctorate from Queen's University Belfast: 2001
- Freeman of Castlereagh: 2002
- Inaugural inductee into the English Football Hall of Fame: 2002
- BBC Sports Personality of the Year Lifetime Achievement Award: 2002
- UEFA Jubilee Awards – Northern Ireland's Golden Player: 2003
- UEFA Golden Jubilee Poll: No. 19
- FIFA 100 (world's greatest living players: 2004)
- Golden Foot: 2005, as football legend
- PFA Merit Award: 2006
- FWA Tribute Award: 2000
- English Football Hall of Fame: 2002
- FIFA Player of the Century:
  - FIFA internet vote: No. 20
  - FIFA Magazine and Grand Jury vote: No. 5
- World Soccer The Greatest Players of the 20th century: No. 8
- Ballon d'Or Dream Team (Bronze): 2020

== Biographies ==
- Bestie (co-written with Joe Lovejoy),
- The Good, The Bad and The Bubbly (with Ross Benson)
- Blessed: The Autobiography (with Roy Collins)
- George Best: A Celebration (Bernie Smith and Maureen Hunt)
- Scoring at Half Time (with Martin Knight).
- Hard Tackles and Dirty Baths (with Harry Harris)
- George Best: A Memoir (Michael Parkinson)
