= Harry Gregg =

Northern Irish footballer and manager (1932–2020)

Harry Gregg OBE
- Gregg (1960)

Personal information
- Full name: Henry Gregg
- Date of birth: 27 October 1932
- Place of birth: Tobermore, Northern Ireland
- Date of death: 16 February 2020 (aged 87)
- Place of death: Coleraine, Northern Ireland
- Height: 6 ft 0 in (1.83 m)
- Position: Goalkeeper

Youth career
- Windsor Park Swifts
- Coleraine

Senior career*
Years	Team	Apps	(Gls)
1952–1957	Doncaster Rovers	94	(0)
1957–1966	Manchester United	210	(0)
1966–1967	Stoke City	2	(0)
Total		306	(0)

International career
1954–1963	Northern Ireland	25	(0)

Managerial career
- 1968–1972: Shrewsbury Town
- 1972–1975: Swansea City
- 1975–1978: Crewe Alexandra
- 1986–1987: Carlisle United
- * Club domestic league appearances and goals

Henry Gregg (27 October 1932 – 16 February 2020) was a Northern Irish professional footballer and manager. A goalkeeper, he played for Manchester United during the reign of Sir Matt Busby, with a total of 247 appearances for the club. He was a survivor of the Munich air disaster in 1958. Gregg also played for Doncaster Rovers and Stoke City, as well as making 25 appearances for the Northern Ireland national team between 1954 and 1963, including at the 1958 FIFA World Cup. He later went into management with Carlisle United, Crewe Alexandra, Shrewsbury Town and Swansea City.

== Club career ==
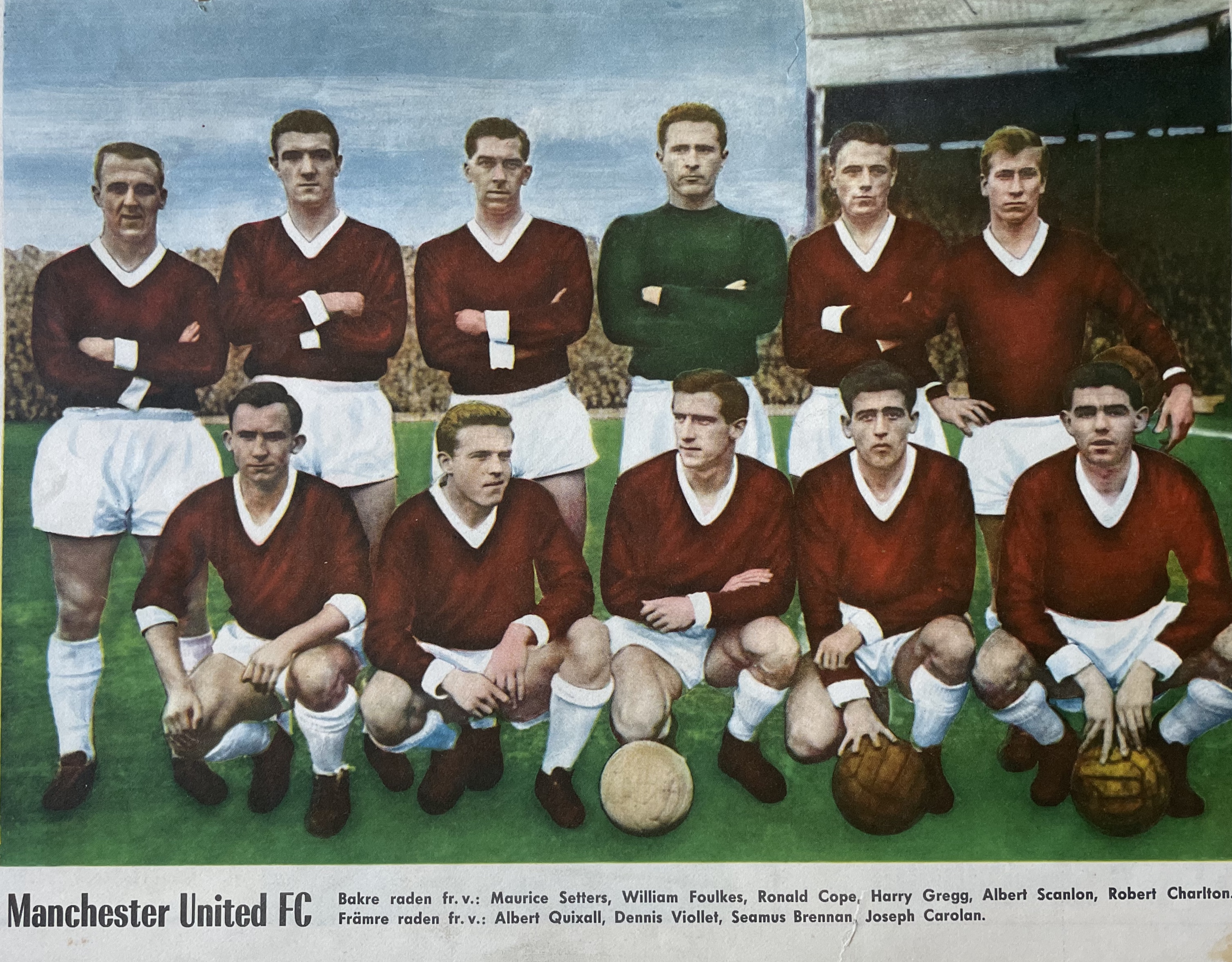
A Manchester United team photo from 1960. Gregg is on the back row in the green shirt.

Gregg was born in Tobermore, County Londonderry to William and Isobel Gregg, who soon after moved to Coleraine. While working as an apprentice joiner, he started his football career with Windsor Park Swifts, the reserve team of Linfield, before signing for his local club, Coleraine. At the age of 18, he earned a move across the Irish Sea to Doncaster Rovers. In December 1957, he transferred to Manchester United for £23,500, at the time a world-record fee for a goalkeeper.

He is sometimes referred to as "The Hero of Munich" for his actions in the aftermath of the Munich air disaster, pulling his teammates – including Bobby Charlton, Jackie Blanchflower and Dennis Viollet – from the burning plane. Among others he helped were Vera Lukić, the pregnant wife of a Yugoslav diplomat and her two-year-old daughter, Vesna, as well as his badly injured manager, Matt Busby. George Best, who used to clean Gregg's boots, said, "Bravery is one thing but what Harry did was about more than bravery. It was about goodness."

Gregg played in United's first match after the disaster, a FA Cup fifth round tie with Sheffield Wednesday. United won 3–0 and went on to reach the 1958 FA Cup Final, which they lost 2–0 to Bolton Wanderers. The second goal in the final was scored in controversial fashion as Nat Lofthouse barged Gregg, and the ball with him, into the goal. United finished ninth in the league that season, as their league form declined after losing so many players in the Munich tragedy.

He was unable to earn a winners' medal with United, despite playing for the club during a successful period. He was ruled out of the 1963 FA Cup Final victory due to a shoulder injury, and a succession of injuries meant that he could not play enough games to qualify for a league championship medal in the 1964–65 season, and he was sold during the first half of their title-winning campaign in 1966–67. During his United career, Gregg kept 48 clean sheets in 247 appearances.

Gregg was transferred to Stoke City in December 1966. He played twice for Stoke, with mixed success; in his first match, he conceded four against Leicester City as Stoke lost 4–2, and then kept a clean sheet in a 2–0 victory over Blackpool. He retired at the end of the 1966–67 season.

== International career ==
Gregg won 25 caps for the Northern Ireland national team. He made his international debut in March 1954, playing against Wales. Gregg featured as Northern Ireland won 3–2 against England at Wembley in November 1957, and helped them qualify for the 1958 FIFA World Cup. He was voted the best goalkeeper of the tournament, in which Northern Ireland reached the quarter-finals.

== Coaching career ==
In 1968, Gregg was appointed manager of Shrewsbury Town. In November 1972, he became manager of Swansea City, resigning in February 1975 to join Crewe Alexandra where he remained until 1978. He then had a spell as goalkeeper coach with his old team Manchester United at the invitation of Dave Sexton, where he stayed until Sexton left in 1981.

His next club was Swindon Town, as assistant manager to Lou Macari. Macari used a direct style of play, which Gregg disapproved of, and they were both sacked by Swindon in April 1985 after the disagreement between the pair became public. Macari was reinstated after a fan protest, and went on to lead Swindon to the Fourth Division title in 1986. Gregg then joined Carlisle United, initially working for manager Bob Stokoe. During the 1986–87 season Gregg succeeded Stokoe as Carlisle manager, but he was unable to prevent them from suffering relegation to the Fourth Division. Gregg left Carlisle during the autumn of 1987.

== Television appearances and portrayals ==
Gregg appeared in a number of television programmes about Manchester United and the Munich air disaster, including Munich: End of a Dream – a 1998 documentary that marked the 40th anniversary of the crash.

On the 50th anniversary of the air crash he appeared in the documentary One Life: Munich Air Disaster, broadcast 6 February 2008 on the BBC, in which he returned to the scene of the crash and the hospital for the first time and also met Zoran Lukić, the son of Mrs Vera Lukić, a Serbian woman (the wife of a Yugoslav diplomat) who was pregnant with Zoran at the time of the disaster. It was Gregg who had saved Mrs Lukić (and her unborn son) from the wreckage, as well as Vera's baby daughter Vesna.

Gregg made an emotional account of the disaster on a TV programme entitled Munich Air Disaster: I Was There on the National Geographic Channel.

Gregg expressed disappointment at never having been able to meet Mr Lukić, who had died in 2007.

Gregg was portrayed by actor Ben Peel in a 2011 BBC film, United, which was centred around the Munich air disaster.

== Personal life ==
Gregg married his first wife, Mavis Markham, at St James's Church, Doncaster, in 1957, while still a Doncaster Rovers player. Mavis died of cancer in 1961. On 2 July 1965, Gregg married Carolyn Maunders at St Mary's Parish Church, Rostherne. They had four children. Gregg's uncle was the grandfather of fellow footballer Steve Lomas, who played for clubs including Manchester City and West Ham United, and managed St Johnstone and Millwall.

Gregg once owned the Windsor Hotel in the town of Portstewart, on the north coast of County Londonderry.

Gregg played for an under-18 team from Coleraine in a Ramelton Cup match during the 1950s. In May 2011, Gregg agreed to go back to Ramelton, County Donegal where he spent an evening, alongside Jobby Crossan, with local people in Ramelton Community Hall.

Gregg celebrated his time at Old Trafford on 15 May 2012 with a testimonial organised by John White and John Dempsey from the George Best Carryduff Manchester United SC. The testimonial featured Manchester United playing an Irish League Select XI managed by Martin O'Neill and David Jeffrey. The match ended 4–1 to Manchester United.

Gregg died on 16 February 2020, aged 87, after several weeks of illness, at the Causeway Hospital in Coleraine, County Londonderry, Northern Ireland.

== Career statistics ==
=== Club ===
Appearances and goals by club, season and competition
Club	Season	League			FA Cup		League Cup		Europe		Total	
Club	Season	Division	Apps	Goals	Apps	Goals	Apps	Goals	Apps	Goals	Apps	Goals
Doncaster Rovers	1952–53	Second Division	8	0	0	0	–		–		8	0
Doncaster Rovers	1953–54	Second Division	2	0	0	0	–		–		2	0
Doncaster Rovers	1954–55	Second Division	2	0	0	0	–		–		2	0
Doncaster Rovers	1955–56	Second Division	21	0	3	0	–		–		24	0
Doncaster Rovers	1956–57	Second Division	40	0	2	0	–		–		42	0
Doncaster Rovers	1957–58	Second Division	21	0	0	0	–		–		21	0
Doncaster Rovers	Total		94	0	5	0	–		–		99	0
Manchester United	1957–58	First Division	19	0	8	0	–		4	0	31	0
Manchester United	1958–59	First Division	41	0	1	0	–		0	0	42	0
Manchester United	1959–60	First Division	33	0	3	0	–		0	0	36	0
Manchester United	1960–61	First Division	27	0	1	0	2	0	0	0	30	0
Manchester United	1961–62	First Division	13	0	0	0	0	0	0	0	13	0
Manchester United	1962–63	First Division	24	0	4	0	0	0	0	0	28	0
Manchester United	1963–64	First Division	25	0	0	0	0	0	2	0	27	0
Manchester United	1964–65	First Division	0	0	0	0	0	0	0	0	0	0
Manchester United	1965–66	First Division	26	0	7	0	0	0	5	0	38	0
Manchester United	1966–67	First Division	2	0	0	0	0	0	0	0	2	0
Manchester United	Total		210	0	24	0	2	0	13	0	247	0
Stoke City	1966–67	First Division	2	0	0	0	0	0	0	0	2	0
Career total			306	0	29	0	2	0	13	0	348	0

=== International ===
Appearances and goals by national team and year
National team	Year	Apps	Goals
Northern Ireland	1954	1	0
Northern Ireland	1956	2	0
Northern Ireland	1957	6	0
Northern Ireland	1958	6	0
Northern Ireland	1959	3	0
Northern Ireland	1960	3	0
Northern Ireland	1961	2	0
Northern Ireland	1963	2	0
Total		25	0

=== Managerial record ===
Managerial record by team and tenure
Team	From	To	Record				
Team	From	To	P	W	D	L	Win %
Shrewsbury Town	1 July 1968	1 October 1972	195	66	55	74	33.8
Swansea City	1 November 1972	1 January 1975	101	34	23	44	33.7
Crewe Alexandra	1 January 1975	31 May 1978	163	53	53	57	32.5
Carlisle United	20 May 1986	17 November 1987	73	20	11	42	27.4
Total			532	173	142	217	32.5

== Honours ==
Manchester United

- FA Cup runner-up: 1957–58

Individual

- FIFA World Cup All-Star Team: 1958
- FIFA World Cup Best Goalkeeper: 1958

Gregg was appointed a Member of the Order of the British Empire (MBE) in 1995, and made an Officer of the Order (OBE) for services to football in the 2019 New Year Honours.

On 1 July 2008, Gregg was made an Honorary Graduate of the University of Ulster and awarded a Doctor of the University (DUniv) in recognition of his contribution to football at their Summer Graduation Ceremony.
