= David Herd (footballer) =

Scottish footballer and manager (1934–2016)

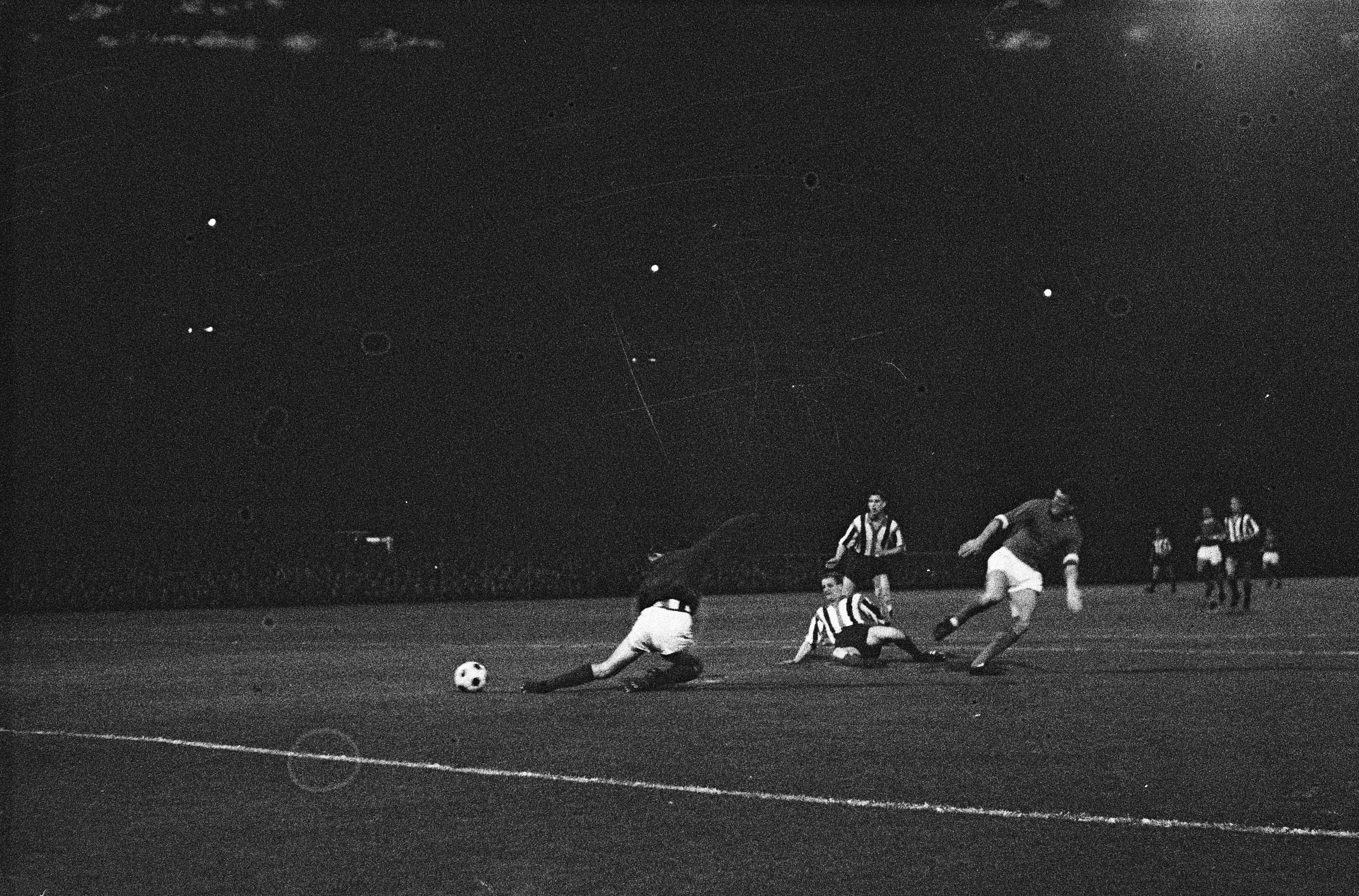
- Herd scoring, 1963

Personal information
- Full name: David George Herd
- Date of birth: 15 April 1934
- Place of birth: Hamilton, Lanarkshire, Scotland
- Date of death: 1 October 2016 (aged 82)
- Position: Forward

Senior career*
Years	Team	Apps	(Gls)
1951–1954	Stockport County	15	(6)
1954–1961	Arsenal	166	(97)
1961–1968	Manchester United	202	(114)
1968–1970	Stoke City	44	(11)
1970–1971	Waterford	3	(0)
Total		430	(228)

International career
1958–1961	Scotland	5	(3)
1961	SFA trial v SFL	1	(2)

Managerial career
- 1971–1972: Lincoln City
- * Club domestic league appearances and goals

David George Herd (15 April 1934 – 1 October 2016) was a Scottish international footballer who played for Arsenal, Manchester United, Stockport County, and Stoke City. His regular position was as a forward where he was a consistent goal scorer.

== Playing career ==
=== Stockport County ===
Herd was born in Hamilton, Lanarkshire but grew up in Manchester as his father Alex was playing for Manchester City and later Stockport County where Herd Jr. began his career. He made his debut on the final day of the 1950–51 season with his father and he scored as County beat Hartlepools United 2–0. His appearances for Stockport were limited by his national service duties. He scored five goals in 12 games in 1953–54 and he attracted the attentions of First Division clubs.

=== Arsenal ===
Herd did well enough to attract the attention of Arsenal, who signed him for £10,000 in 1954. Herd made his Arsenal debut on 19 February 1955 against Leicester City. Herd continued to be a bit part player, playing just eight games in his first two seasons at the club, before making his breakthrough in 1956–57, scoring 18 goals in 28 games that season. From then on he was an established goalscorer, being the club's top goalscorer for four seasons straight, from 1956–57 through to 1960–61 – when he hit 29 goals, the most by an Arsenal player since Ronnie Rooke.

However, Arsenal's poor form meant they were nowhere near winning a trophy, the closest coming was a third place in the league in 1958–59. Despite being top scorer in 1960–61, Herd was unsettled at Arsenal due to their lack of success, and he moved to Manchester United in July 1961 for £35,000. In all he scored 107 goals for Arsenal in 180 appearances, making him the club's 15th highest goalscorer.

=== Manchester United ===
His first game for United came against West Ham United on 19 August 1961. Herd helped the club to the 1962–63 FA Cup, scoring two goals in the final itself against Leicester City. He also helped them to win the English league championship in 1965 and 1967,.

His first team appearances were limited after he suffered a broken leg in March 1967. Herd was part of the squad that won the 1967–68 European Cup, but he was not selected for the final on 29 May 1968. In all, he scored 145 career goals in 265 appearances (including one substitute appearance), an average of 0.54 goals per game and is currently 13th on the all-time club goalscorers list. He also once scored past three different goalkeepers in one match on 26 November 1966 against Sunderland, as United won the game 5–0.

=== Stoke City ===
He left Manchester United in July 1968 for Stoke City on a free transfer. He played 39 games for Stoke in 1968–69 scoring nine goals as Stoke had a poor season narrowly avoiding relegation. In 1969–70 Herd made nine appearances scoring twice and was released at the end of the season.

=== Waterford United ===
In December 1970 Herd signed for Shay Brennan at Waterford. He made his league of Ireland debut at Kilcohan Park on 14 December.

== International career ==
He won his first cap for Scotland, on 18 October 1958 against Wales at Ninian Park; Scotland won 3–0. Herd won five caps in total for Scotland between 1958 and 1961, scoring three goals, his last cap coming in a 4–0 defeat by Czechoslovakia on 14 May 1961.

== Managerial career ==
After retiring from playing, he had a stint managing Lincoln City between 1971 and 1972.

== Personal life ==
Born in Hamilton, Lanarkshire, Herd was the son of former Manchester City player Alec Herd and the nephew of Scottish international Sandy Herd.

He died on 1 October 2016. Players of former clubs Manchester United and Stoke City wore black arm bands when they played each other the next day. His small, family funeral on 14 October at Middlebie in Dumfriesshire was in the same cemetery as his parents who spent their latter years living in Ecclefechan.

== Career statistics ==
=== Club ===
Appearances and goals by club, season and competition
Club	Season	League			FA Cup		League Cup		Europe		Other^{[A]}		Total	
Club	Season	Division	Apps	Goals	Apps	Goals	Apps	Goals	Apps	Goals	Apps	Goals	Apps	Goals
Stockport County	1950–51	Third Division North	1	1	0	0	—		—		—		1	1
Stockport County	1951–52	Third Division North	2	0	0	0	—		—		—		2	0
Stockport County	1952–53	Third Division North	0	0	0	0	—		—		—		0	0
Stockport County	1953–54	Third Division North	12	5	0	0	—		—		—		12	5
Stockport County	Total		15	6	0	0	—		—		—		15	6
Arsenal	1954–55	First Division	3	1	0	0	—		0	0	0	0	3	1
Arsenal	1955–56	First Division	5	2	0	0	—		0	0	0	0	5	2
Arsenal	1956–57	First Division	22	12	6	6	—		0	0	0	0	28	18
Arsenal	1957–58	First Division	39	24	1	0	—		0	0	0	0	40	24
Arsenal	1958–59	First Division	26	15	5	3	—		0	0	0	0	31	18
Arsenal	1959–60	First Division	31	14	1	0	—		0	0	0	0	32	14
Arsenal	1960–61	First Division	40	29	1	1	0	0	0	0	0	0	41	30
Arsenal	Total		166	97	14	10	0	0	0	0	0	0	180	107
Manchester United	1961–62	First Division	27	14	5	3	0	0	0	0	0	0	32	17
Manchester United	1962–63	First Division	37	19	6	2	0	0	0	0	0	0	43	21
Manchester United	1963–64	First Division	30	20	7	4	0	0	6	3	1	0	44	27
Manchester United	1964–65	First Division	37	20	7	2	0	0	11	6	0	0	55	28
Manchester United	1965–66	First Division	37	24	7	3	0	0	7	5	1	1	52	33
Manchester United	1966–67	First Division	28	16	2	1	1	1	0	0	0	0	31	18
Manchester United	1967–68	First Division	6	1	1	0	0	0	1	0	0	0	8	1
Manchester United	Total		202	114	35	15	1	1	25	14	2	1	265	145
Stoke City	1968–69	First Division	35	9	4	0	0	0	0	0	0	0	39	9
Stoke City	1969–70	First Division	9	2	0	0	0	0	0	0	0	0	9	2
Stoke City	Total		44	11	4	0	0	0	0	0	0	0	48	11
Waterford United	1970–71	League of Ireland	3	0	0	0	0	0	0	0	0	0	3	0
Career Total			430	228	53	25	1	1	25	14	2	1	511	269

A. The "Other" column constitutes appearances and goals in the FA Charity Shield.

=== International ===
National team	Year	Apps	Goals
Scotland	1958	2	1
Scotland	1959	1	0
Scotland	1961	2	2
Total		5	3

== Honours ==
Manchester United

- Football League First Division: 1964–65, 1966–67
- FA Cup: 1962–63
- FA Charity Shield: 1965
- European Cup: 1967–68

== See also ==
- List of footballers in England by number of league goals (200+)
