= Phil Chisnall =

English association footballer (1942–2021)

- Chisnall in the early 1960s

Personal information
- Full name: John Philip Chisnall
- Date of birth: 27 October 1942
- Place of birth: Manchester, England
- Date of death: 4 March 2021 (aged 78)
- Height: 5 ft 8 in (1.73 m)
- Position: Forward

Senior career*
Years	Team	Apps	(Gls)
1959–1964	Manchester United	35	(8)
1964–1967	Liverpool	6	(1)
1967–1971	Southend United	142	(28)
1971–1972	Stockport County	30	(2)
Total		213	(39)

International career
1964	England U23	1	(0)
- * Club domestic league appearances and goals

John Philip Chisnall (27 October 1942 – 4 March 2021) was an English professional footballer, who played as an inside forward for 13 seasons. He played for Manchester United, Liverpool, Southend United and Stockport County from 1959 to 1972. He was noted for being the last player to have been transferred directly between Manchester United and Liverpool at the time of his death. In the space of twelve months, Chisnall played under three key managers – Matt Busby at Manchester United, Bill Shankly at Liverpool, and Alf Ramsey for the England under-23 team.

== Early life ==
Chisnall was born in Manchester on 27 October 1942. He played schools football for both Lancashire and England. Growing up a fan of Manchester United, he signed for the club as an apprentice in April 1958, two months after the Munich air disaster. He suffered a knee injury that almost jeopardised his career but eventually recovered. He subsequently turned professional in November 1959.

== Professional career ==
=== Manchester United ===
Chisnall made his debut for the United first team under Matt Busby in December 1961, at the age of 19, playing against Everton. He played in nine straight games and scored his first goal during a 2–0 victory in the Manchester derby at Maine Road. He spent the following season primarily with the reserve team to develop his skills. Chisnall was given the number 8 shirt at the start of the 1963–64 season, displacing Albert Quixall. He went on to form a strike partnership with Ian Moir and David Sadler, both of whom had also been recently promoted. His performance resulted in his being called up to the England under-23 team in November 1963. He made one appearance for the England squad, a 4–2 win over Germany at Anfield. Alf Ramsey said at the time that Chisnall was "probably the best passer of a ball in the country". However, he fell out of favour from the club starting lineup towards the latter part of 1963–64. He played a total of 47 times for the club, scoring 10 goals.

=== Liverpool ===
Chisnall was subsequently transferred to Liverpool in April 1964 for a fee of £25,000. He recounted how Busby informed him of the offer but assured him that there was no compulsion for him to leave. Chisnall observed how his transfer was helped by the close friendship between Busby and Bill Shankly, which he compared to brothers, as well as father and son. He said in 2007 "there was nothing like the intensity between [Liverpool] and United that now exists". He was the last player to be transferred directly between the two clubs at the time of his death. Chisnall made his debut, four months after signing, at the 1964 FA Charity Shield as a substitute. He scored his first goal for the club two days later in the team's first ever European Cup game in a win at KR Reykjavik on 17 August 1964. He proceeded to be the first player to touch the ball on Match of the Day, against Arsenal on the first day of the 1964–65 season. He played his final game for Liverpool in the first leg of the 1965–66 European Cup Winners' Cup semi-final against Celtic. Chisnall ultimately scored two goals in nine appearances with the team.

=== Later career ===
Chisnall moved to Southend United for £14,000 in 1967. This was the most expensive transfer fee paid by Southend until it signed Bill Garner two years later. Chisnall appeared in 161 games and scored 32 goals in his four seasons with the club. He finished his career with Stockport County, playing one season with them in 1971–72. He made 30 league appearances for the team and scored two goals.

== Later life ==
After retiring from football, Chisnall settled down in Urmston. He operated two betting shops, before becoming a factory processor in Trafford Park and working at a malt loaf bakery. His grandson played as a winger for United's academy team around 2007. Chisnall expressed his displeasure at the manner in which the attempted transfer of Gabriel Heinze from Manchester United to Liverpool unfolded in the summer of 2007. He reflected how during his playing career, "you signed a contract, stayed loyal to your club until it was finished and regarded your wife as your agent. But there's no loyalty in football nowadays; players just leg it if they're unhappy."

Chisnall suffered a major stroke in late 2013 that left him unable to walk and with speech problems. A charity evening was held in October 2014 near Manchester to raise money for him and was attended by former Manchester United and Manchester City players. He died on 4 March 2021 at the age of 78.

== See also ==
- Liverpool F.C.–Manchester United F.C. rivalry
