= David Gaskell =

English footballer (1940–2025)

Personal information
- Full name: John David Gaskell
- Date of birth: 5 October 1940
- Place of birth: Orrell, England
- Date of death: 24 January 2025 (aged 84)
- Height: 1.78 m (5 ft 10 in)
- Position: Goalkeeper

Youth career
- 1955–1956: Manchester United

Senior career*
| Years | Team | Apps | (Gls) |
| 1956–1968 | Manchester United | 96 | (0) |
| 1968–1969 | Wigan Athletic | 35 | (0) |
| 1969–1973 | Wrexham | 95 | (0) |
| 1973–1974 | Arcadia Shepherds | | |
- * Club domestic league appearances and goals

John David Gaskell (5 October 1940 – 24 January 2025) was an English footballer who played as a goalkeeper. He started his career with Manchester United, becoming their youngest ever player. He helped United win several trophies during the 1960s. He left the club for Wigan Athletic in June 1968 before joining Wrexham a year later.

== Career ==
Born in Orrell, Lancashire, Gaskell began his football career with Manchester United, having been spotted playing for youth team Orrell St Luke's. He made his senior debut for United on 24 October 1956, when he played in the 1956 FA Charity Shield at the age of 16 years and 19 days, making him the youngest player ever to have played for the club. His league debut came over a year later, in a 4–3 home defeat to Tottenham Hotspur on 30 November 1957.

Gaskell was not with the Manchester United squad when their aeroplane crashed at Munich on the way home from a European Cup tie on 6 February 1958, killing eight players.

By the early 1960s, Gaskell had become a regular in the United first team, covering for first-choice goalkeeper Harry Gregg. The zenith of Gaskell's career came in 1963, when he kept goal for United in their 1963 FA Cup Final win over Leicester City.

A succession of injuries to Gregg meant that Gaskell was in and out of the first team on a regular basis, but the signing of Pat Dunne in May 1964 meant that Gaskell was relegated to the position of third-choice goalkeeper. Both Gregg and Dunne left in 1966, but the arrival of Alex Stepney and the emergence of young Jimmy Rimmer meant that Gaskell was still third-choice at the club. For the last two years of his Manchester United contract he was in dispute with Matt Busby and refused to play for the reserve teams and instead turned out for Orrell R.U.F.C.. He was released in the summer of 1968, and signed for non-League club Wigan Athletic.

A year later, Gaskell returned to League football and signed for Wrexham, and remained there for three years. He worked for Post Office Telephones (now BT) for a short period before moving to South Africa, where he played for Arcadia Shepherds until his retirement. He also spent time working in Kuwait. (Note: Multiple sources are unclear if this was as a player or a coach.)

After recovering from a serious knee injury, he made a rugby comeback in his late thirties for Wrexham RFC in the WRU Challenge Cup against some of Wales' leading teams of the day.

== Personal life and death ==
Gaskell was married to his wife, Barbara, for 68 years. Together they had three daughters. He died on 24 January 2025, at the age of 84.

== Honours ==
Manchester United

- Football League First Division: 1964–65, 1966–67
- FA Cup: 1962–63
- FA Charity Shield: 1956
