= List of Charlton Athletic F.C. players =

This is a list of notable footballers who have played for Charlton Athletic F.C.. This means players who have played 100 or more first-class matches for the club.

- For a list of all Charlton Athletic players, major or minor, with a Wikipedia article, see Category: Charlton Athletic F.C. players
- For current players see Charlton Athletic current squad

Players are listed in alphabetical order. Appearances and goals are for first-team competitive matches only (including Cup matches). Substitute appearances included. Names in bold are currently a part of the club

Statistics correct as of 23 May 2026.

Name	Nationality	Position	Period	Appearances	Goals
George Armitage	England	DF	1923–30	182	4
Chuks Aneke	England	FW	2019–2021; 2022–2025	138	27
Dai Astley	Wales	FW	1927–31	105	32
Bobby Ayre	England	FW	1952–58	115	54
Mike Bailey	England	MF	1958–66	168	22
Ted Ballantyne	England	MF	1925–31	100	12
Stuart Balmer	Scotland	DF	1990–98	263	9
Anthony Barness	England	DF	1991–92; 1996–2000	143	5
Shaun Bartlett	South Africa	FW	2000–06	139	26
George Biswell	England	MF/FW	1925–34	101	26
Sam Bartram	England	GK	1934–56	623	
Bob Bolder	England	GK	1986–93	296	
Billy Bonds	England	DF/MF	1964–67	100	1
Richie Bowman	England	DF	1971–77	110	9
Les Boulter	Wales	FW	1932–39	176	29
Steve Brown	England	DF	1991–2003	283	11
Les Berry	England	DF	1975–86	396	11
Alan Campbell	Scotland	MF/FW	1965–71	214	29
Jock Campbell	Scotland	DF	1946–58	276	1
Phil Chapple	England	DF	1993–98	167	15
Jordan Cousins	Jamaica	MF	2012–16	136	7
**Conor Coventry**	Republic of Ireland	MF	2024–present	110	1
Bob Curtis	England	DF/MF	1966–78	372	38
George Dobson	England	MF	2021–24	144	6
Chris Duffy	Scotland	FW	1945–53	183	48
Willie Duff	Scotland	GK	1956–63	231	0
Dennis Edwards	England	FW	1958–65	187	66
Rob Elliot	England	GK	2004–11	109	
Jason Euell	Jamaica	MF/FW	2001–06; 2011–12	170	39
Benny Fenton	England	MF/FW	1946–55	275	22
Eddie Firmani	South Africa	FW	1951–55; 1963–65; 1966–68	177	89
Mark Fish	South Africa	DF	2000–05	111	2
Mike Flanagan	England	FW	1971–79; 1983–86	396	120
Jake Forster-Caskey	England	MF	2016–22	128	13
Jonathan Fortune	England	DF	1998–09; 2010–12	215	9
James Giles	England	DF	1975–78	109	8
**Macaulay Gillesphey**	England	DF	2024–present	109	8
Len Glover	England	FW	1962–68	196	24
Bert Goodman	England	DF/MF/FW	1921–25	133	19
Kim Grant	Ghana	FW	1990–96	155	25
Harry Gregory	England	MF/FW	1966–71	159	26
Steve Gritt	England	DF/MF/FW	1977–93	435	26
Derek Hales	England	FW	1973–76; 1978–85	368	168
Ben Hamer	England	GK	2011–14	121	
Cyril Hammond	England	MF	1950–58	208	4
Baden Herod	England	DF	1921–28	236	2
John Hewie	Scotland	DF	1951–66	530	38
Marvin Hinton	England	DF	1957–64	145	2
Alex Hird	Scotland	MF	1927–31	144	
Harold Hobbis	England	FW	1931–48	268	78
Matt Holland	Republic of Ireland	MF	2003–09	215	14
Arthur Horsfield	England	DF/FW	1972–76	156	61
Jackie Horton	England	FW	1926–33	272	58
Hermann Hreiðarsson	Iceland	DF	2003–07	149	4
John Humphrey	England	DF	1985–90; 1995–96	267	4
Peter Hunt	England	MF	1972–77	181	8
Gordon Hurst	England	FW	1946–58	393	81
Johnnie Jackson	England	MF	2010–18	279	55
Gordon Jago	England	DF	1954–62	147	1
Claus Jensen	Denmark	MF	2000–04	133	17
Joe Jobling	England	MF	1931–39	223	5
Jonatan Johansson	Finland	FW	2000–06	167	33
Nicky Johns	England	GK	1978–88	322	
William Johnson	England	MF	1945–53	162	1
Keith Jones	England	MF	1994–2000	176	7
**Lloyd Jones**	England	DF	2023–present	124	6
Mike Kenning	England	FW	1962–67; 1968–72	238	59
Dean Kiely	Republic of Ireland	GK	1999–2006	248	
Billy Kiernan	England	MF/FW	1949–61	401	93
Mark Kinsella	Republic of Ireland	MF	1996–2002	226	23
Brian Kinsey	England	DF/FW	1956–71	418	26
Radostin Kishishev	Bulgaria	DF/MF	2000–07	200	2
Paul Konchesky	England	DF	1997–2005	169	6
Sam Lawrie	Scotland	MF	1957–64	208	78
Carl Leaburn	England	FW	1987–98	376	66
**Miles Leaburn**	England	FW	2022–present	130	34
Stuart Leary	South Africa	FW	1951–62	403	163
Robert Lee	England	MF/FW	1984–92	343	65
Kevin Lisbie	Jamaica	FW	1996–2007	146	19
Frank Lock	England	DF	1946–54	230	8
Fred Lucas	England	MF/FW	1955–64	198	31
Stephen MacKenzie	England	MF	1987–91	117	6
Lawrie Madden	England	DF/MF	1977–82	127	7
Roy Matthews	England	FW	1959–67	181	52
Scott Minto	England	DF/MF	1988–94	203	9
Graham Moore	Wales	MF/FW	1967–71	120	8
Michael Morrison	England	DF	2011–14	150	8
Paul Mortimer	England	MF	1987–91; 1994–99	225	34
Garry Nelson	England	FW	1991–96	222	41
Shaun Newton	England	MF	1992–2001	285	27
Jimmy Oakes	England	DF	1932–39	234	
Jack Oakes	England	DF/FW	1935–47	145	3
Sid O'Linn	South Africa	MF/FW	1947–57	194	33
Alan Pardew	England	MF	1991–95	124	27
Scott Parker	England	MF	1997–2004	145	10
Willie Paterson	Scotland	MF	1925–28	102	
Keith Peacock	England	MF	1962–79	591	107
Andy Peake	England	MF	1986–91	212	6
Jason Pearce	England	DF	2016–22	175	7
Harold Phipps	England	DF	1945–51	201	2
Darren Pitcher	England	DF/MF	1988–94	204	12
Chris Powell	England	DF	1998–2004; 2005–06; 2007–08	270	3
Colin Powell	England	FW	1972–81	358	35
Charles Preedy	England	GK	1923–28	140	
John Pugsley	England	DF/MF	1928–34	225	9
Albert Purdy	England	MF	1921–25	110	
Ben Purrington	England	DF	2019–2022	115	9
Johnnie Rankin	Scotland	FW	1925–30	204	37
Peter Reeves	England	MF	1965–74	294	2
Mark Reid	Scotland	DF	1985–91	250	17
Charles Revell	England	MF/FW	1946–51	117	18
George Robinson	England		1931–47	254	45
John Robinson	Wales	MF	1992–2003	382	43
Martin Robinson	England	FW	1977–85	256	67
Mark Robson	England	MF	1993–97	123	11
Richard Rufus	England	DF	1994–2003	323	13
Lloyd Sam	England	MF	2003–10	134	7
Naby Sarr	Senegal	DF	2015–20	116	8
Jose Semedo	Portugal	CM	2007–11	137	2
John Sewell	England	DF/MF	1956–64	204	5
Peter Shaw	England	DF	1977–81	122	6
Dave Shipperley	England	DF	1970–74; 1977–80	175	16
Peter Shirtliff	England	DF	1986–89	125	9
John Shreeve	England	DF	1936–51	166	0
Kevin Smith	England	MF	1979–84	114	14
Norman Smith	England	DF	1922–36	450	16
Steve Smith	England	FW	1922–25	102	10
Chris Solly	England	DF	2009–2020	313	2
Alex Steele	Northern Ireland	MF/FW	1921–26	146	26
Graham Stuart	England	MF	1999–2005	164	24
Mark Stuart	England	FW	1984–89	129	31
Johnny Summers	England	FW	1956–61	182	104
Jerome Thomas	England	MF	2004–08	119	7
Steve Thompson	England	DF	1985–88	112	1
Brian Tocknell	South Africa	DF/MF	1960–66	220	15
Don Townsend	Republic of Ireland	DF	1954–62	268	1
Ray Treacy	Republic of Ireland	FW	1967–72	164	52
Bert Turner	Wales	DF/MF	1933–47	196	3
Derek Ufton	England	DF	1949–60	277	0
Charlie Vaughan	England	FW	1946–53	238	94
Scott Wagstaff	England	MF	2008–13	142	22
Phillip Walker	England	MF	1979–80	102	17
Colin Walsh	Scotland	MF	1986–96	291	30
Paul Walsh	England	FW	1979–82	100	31
Phil Warman	England	DF/FW	1969–81	364	20
Simon Webster	England	DF	1990–93	143	7
Don Welsh	England	FW	1934–48	216	50
Paul Went	England	DF/MF/FW	1967–72	178	16
Ronald White	England	FW	1953–62	181	9
Fred Whitlow	England	FW	1927–31	100	64
David Whyte	England	FW	1991–92; 1995–97	106	35
Rhoys Wiggins	Wales	DF	2011–15	128	1
Monty Wilkinson	England	FW	1932–39	237	51
Paul Williams	England	FW	1987–90; 1995–96	104	29
Fred Wood	England	GK	1922–25	102	
Jeff Wood	England	GK	1975–81	166	
Charlie Wright	Scotland	GK	1965–71	209	
Luke Young	England	DF	2001–07	208	4
