= 1958–59 Huddersfield Town A.F.C. season =

Huddersfield Town
1958–59 season
- Chairman: Stephen Lister
- Manager: Bill Shankly
- Stadium: Leeds Road
- Football League Second Division: 14th
- FA Cup: Third round (eliminated by Ipswich Town)
- Top goalscorer: League: Les Massie (15); All: Les Massie (15)
- Highest home attendance: 20,301 vs Sunderland (8 November 1958)
- Lowest home attendance: 9,604 vs Ipswich Town (7 March 1959)
- Biggest win: 5–0 vs Liverpool (4 October 1958)
- Biggest defeat: 1–5 vs Stoke City (13 December 1958)

Huddersfield Town's 1958–59 campaign was a season under Bill Shankly, which saw Town make little progress up the Division 2 table, with the team finishing in 14th place.

== Squad at the start of the season ==
Note: Flags indicate national team as defined under FIFA eligibility rules; some limited exceptions apply. Players may hold more than one non-FIFA nationality.

Pos.	Nation	Player
GK	ENG	Harry Fearnley
GK	RSA	Sandy Kennon
DF	ENG	John Coddington
DF	ENG	Jack Connor
DF	ENG	Tony Conwell
DF	ENG	Brian Gibson
DF	SCO	Gordon Low
DF	ENG	Bill McGarry
DF	ENG	Ken Taylor
DF	ENG	Ray Wilson

Pos.	Nation	Player
MF	ENG	Bob Ledger
MF	ENG	Kevin McHale
FW	SCO	Alex Bain
FW	ENG	Tony France
FW	ENG	Derek Hawksworth
FW	ENG	Stan Hepton
FW	ENG	Stan Howard
FW	SCO	Denis Law
FW	SCO	Les Massie

== Review ==
Bill Shankly attempted to improve on Town's 9th-place finish the previous season. Their form was mixed for a large portion of the season with many wins, draws and losses at exactly the wrong time of the season. Their best wins were a 5–0 win over Liverpool, a 5–1 win over Middlesbrough and a 5–2 away win at Leyton Orient.

They finished in 14th place with just 40 points, although they were 12 points clear of relegated Grimsby Town, but they were 20 points behind promoted Fulham.

== Squad at the end of the season ==
Note: Flags indicate national team as defined under FIFA eligibility rules; some limited exceptions apply. Players may hold more than one non-FIFA nationality.

Pos.	Nation	Player
GK	ENG	Harry Fearnley
GK	ENG	Ray Wood
DF	ENG	John Coddington
DF	ENG	Jack Connor
DF	ENG	Tony Conwell
DF	ENG	Brian Gibson
DF	SCO	Gordon Low
DF	ENG	Bill McGarry
DF	ENG	Ken Taylor
DF	ENG	Ray Wilson
MF	ENG	Bob Ledger

Pos.	Nation	Player
MF	ENG	Kevin McHale
FW	SCO	Alex Bain
FW	ENG	Tony France
FW	ENG	Derek Hawksworth
FW	ENG	Stan Hepton
FW	ENG	Stan Howard
FW	SCO	Denis Law
FW	SCO	Les Massie
FW	SCO	Willie Sinclair
FW	ENG	Brian Tickell

== Results ==
=== Division Two ===
Date	Opponents	Home/ Away	Result F – A	Scorers	Attendance	Position
23 August 1958	Derby County	H	1–1	Massie	16,977	8th
27 August 1958	Cardiff City	H	3–0	Malloy (og), Massie, Hawksworth	13,266	4th
30 August 1958	Barnsley	A	0–1		17,684	11th
3 September 1958	Cardiff City	A	2–3	Hawksworth (2, 1 pen)	13,078	12th
6 September 1958	Rotherham United	H	3–0	Massie (2), Law	14,330	8th
9 September 1958	Bristol City	H	0–1		13,884	9th
13 September 1958	Sheffield United	A	0–0		22,980	11th
16 September 1958	Bristol City	A	1–2	Massie	29,148	12th
20 September 1958	Brighton & Hove Albion	H	3–2	McGarry, Burtenshaw (og), Massie	13,244	12th
27 September 1958	Grimsby Town	A	1–2	Jobling (og)	14,401	15th
4 October 1958	Liverpool	H	5–0	Hawksworth (2), Massie, Taylor, Wilson	15,934	11th
11 October 1958	Bristol Rovers	A	1–2	McHale	16,753	14th
18 October 1958	Ipswich Town	A	0–0		14,578	13th
25 October 1958	Swansea Town	H	3–2	McGarry (2), McHale	15,629	10th
1 November 1958	Leyton Orient	A	5–2	Howard, McKnight (og), Massie, Hawksworth, McHale	13,828	8th
8 November 1958	Sunderland	H	1–1	Massie	20,301	9th
15 November 1958	Lincoln City	A	1–1	Hawksworth	9,361	9th
22 November 1958	Fulham	H	2–1	Hawksworth, Massie	19,778	9th
29 November 1958	Sheffield Wednesday	A	1–4	Massie	25,394	9th
6 December 1958	Scunthorpe United	H	0–1		13,888	11th
13 December 1958	Stoke City	A	1–5	Hawksworth (pen)	12,761	11th
20 December 1958	Derby County	A	1–3	Howard	13,874	14th
25 December 1958	Charlton Athletic	H	1–0	Howard	14,295	11th
27 December 1958	Charlton Athletic	A	1–2	Massie	20,381	13th
1 January 1959	Middlesbrough	A	1–3	Howard	28,154	16th
3 January 1959	Barnsley	H	2–1	Massie, Hawksworth (pen)	17,933	12th
31 January 1959	Sheffield United	H	0–2		17,402	15th
7 February 1959	Brighton & Hove Albion	A	0–2		18,828	16th
14 February 1959	Grimsby Town	H	2–0	Bain, Hawksworth	11,389	15th
21 February 1959	Liverpool	A	2–2	McHale, White (og)	28,860	15th
28 February 1959	Sunderland	A	0–1		27,264	16th
7 March 1959	Ipswich Town	H	3–0	Low, Bain, Howard	9,604	14th
14 March 1959	Swansea Town	A	1–0	Bain	8,176	14th
21 March 1959	Leyton Orient	H	0–0		10,065	14th
28 March 1959	Bristol Rovers	A	1–1	McHale	16,029	15th
30 March 1959	Middlesbrough	H	5–1	Howard, Low, Sinclair, McHale, Massie	14,671	13th
4 April 1959	Lincoln City	H	2–1	Low, Howard	12,646	12th
11 April 1959	Fulham	A	0–1		24,000	15th
18 April 1959	Sheffield Wednesday	H	1–2	Sinclair	19,960	15th
22 April 1959	Stoke City	H	1–2	McGarry (pen)	9,819	15th
25 April 1959	Scunthorpe United	A	3–0	Law, Howard, Wilson	9,035	15th
30 April 1959	Rotherham United	A	1–0	Massie	10,553	14th

=== FA Cup ===
Date	Round	Opponents	Home/ Away	Result F – A	Scorers	Attendance
10 January 1959	Round 3	Ipswich Town	A	0–1		14,521

== Appearances and goals ==
Name	Nationality	Position	League		FA Cup		Total	
Name	Nationality	Position	Apps	Goals	Apps	Goals	Apps	Goals
Alex Bain	Scotland	FW	10	3	0	0	10	3
John Coddington	England	DF	37	0	1	0	38	0
Jack Connor	England	DF	12	0	1	0	13	0
Tony Conwell	England	DF	26	0	1	0	27	0
Harry Fearnley	England	GK	1	0	0	0	1	0
Tony France	England	FW	1	0	0	0	1	0
Brian Gibson	England	DF	12	0	0	0	12	0
Derek Hawksworth	England	MF	33	11	1	0	34	11
Stan Hepton	England	MF	1	0	1	0	2	0
Stan Howard	England	MF	40	8	1	0	41	8
Sandy Kennon	South Africa	GK	19	0	0	0	19	0
Denis Law	Scotland	MF	26	2	0	0	26	2
Bob Ledger	England	MF	9	0	0	0	9	0
Gordon Low	Scotland	DF	36	3	0	0	36	3
Les Massie	Scotland	FW	42	15	1	0	43	15
Bill McGarry	England	DF	32	4	0	0	32	4
Kevin McHale	England	MF	37	6	1	0	38	6
Willie Sinclair	Scotland	FW	8	2	0	0	8	2
Ken Taylor	England	DF	15	1	1	0	16	1
Brian Tickell	England	FW	1	0	0	0	1	0
Ray Wilson	England	DF	42	2	1	0	43	2
Ray Wood	England	GK	22	0	1	0	23	0
