= Charlton Athletic F.C. 7–6 Huddersfield Town A.F.C. =

1957 football match in England

Charlton Athletic 7–6 Huddersfield Town
- Event: 1957–58 Football League Second Division
Charlton Athletic	Huddersfield Town
7	6
- Date: Saturday, 21 December 1957
- Venue: The Valley, London
- Referee: Ron Warnke
- Attendance: 12,535
- Weather: Chilly, but dry

Charlton Athletic F.C. 7–6 Huddersfield Town A.F.C. was an association football match between Football League Second Division teams Charlton Athletic and Huddersfield Town that took place on 21 December 1957 at Charlton Athletic's home ground, The Valley. Charlton played most of the match with 10 men after their captain Derek Ufton was injured, and Huddersfield were leading 5–1 with just 27 minutes remaining. At that point, Johnny Summers began an extraordinary passage of play in which he scored four goals (he had already scored one early in the second half) and assisted with two others to allow Charlton to win 7–6. Huddersfield become the first, and still the only, team to score six goals in a professional football match in England and still be on the losing side. A reporter at the time described the match as "amazing, incredible, fantastic".

== Background ==
Bill Shankly became manager of Huddersfield after Andy Beattie resigned in November 1956, so 1957–58 was his first full season in charge of the team. After the team's glory years in the 1920s, winning the 1922 FA Cup final and leading the First Division for three consecutive years in 1923–24, 1924–25, and 1925–26, Huddersfield had been spent many years towards the bottom of Football League First Division. They were finally relegated at the end of 1951–52, but gained immediate re-promotion the following season. They came third in the First Division in 1953–54, only to be relegated again in 1955–56, and remained in the Second Division at the end of 1956–57.

Charlton Athletic had reached the First Division in 1936, been Division One runners-up the following year, and won the 1947 FA Cup final, but were also newly relegated to the Second Division, having conceded 120 goals to finish at the bottom of the First Division at the end of 1956–57. Their manager, Jimmy Trotter, had replaced Jimmy Seed after his resignation in September 1956 ended Seed's 23 years in charge at Charlton.

The teams had already met on the first day of the 1957–58 season, at Huddersfield. Charlton were 3–0 up at half time, but Huddersfield scored 3 goals in the second half to secure a draw. After that, Huddersfield were having a moderately successful season in 1957–58, with 6 wins (3 away), 9 draws, and 6 losses (2 at home), but Charlton were doing better, and were in the race for promotion back to the First Division.

The teams met again just before Christmas.

== The teams ==
21 December 1957

Charlton Athletic	7–6	Huddersfield Town
Summers 47', 64', 73', 78', 81'; Ryan 63', 89'	Report	Massie 27'; Bain 35', 49'; McGarry 51' (pen.); Ledger 62'; Howard 86'

The Valley, London
Attendance: 12,535
Referee: Ron Warnke

Charlton Athletic
GK	(Scotland) Willie Duff
DF	(Wales) Trevor Edwards
DF	(England) Don Townsend
MF	(Scotland) John Hewie
MF	(England) Derek Ufton	(substituted off) 17'
MF	(England) Billy Kiernan
FW	(Australia) Ron White
FW	(England) Fred Lucas
FW	(Scotland) Johnny "Buck" Ryan
FW	(South Africa) Stuart Leary
FW	(England) Johnny Summers

Huddersfield Town
GK	(South Africa) Sandy Kennon
DF	(England) Tony Conwell
DF	(England) Ray Wilson
MF	(England) Ken Taylor
MF	(England) Jack Connor
MF	(England) Bill McGarry
FW	(England) Bob Ledger
FW	(England) Stan Howard
FW	(Scotland) Alex Bain
FW	(Scotland) Les Massie
FW	(England) Ron Simpson

== The match ==
The match opened quietly, with a smaller crowd than usual due to the cold and wet weather, but with Huddersfield apparently the livelier team. Just 17 minutes into the match, Charlton's captain and centre half, Derek Ufton was taken to hospital after he landed awkwardly from a challenge and dislocated his shoulder. With no substitutes allowed, Charlton were forced to play another 73 minutes with ten men. Huddersfield took control of the match. Les Massie pierced the leaky Charlton defence to score the first goal for Huddersfield at 27 minutes. Eight minutes later, Alex Bain added a second. Charlton managed to keep Huddersfield at bay until half-time, and so trailed 2–0 at the break. Seeing little chance of a comeback, some of the crowd started to leave.

During half time, Charlton's manager Jimmy Trotter decided to move left winger Johnny Summers to centre forward, and asked his players to feed the ball to Summers, seeing him as their likeliest way to get back into the match. Summers also replaced his old boots, which were on the verge of falling apart, with some new ones.

Trotter's plan seemed to be working when the left-footed Summers scored with his unfavoured right foot from close range within 2 minutes of the start of the second half, but the relief was short-lived. The pitch was getting increasingly muddy, and gaps were opening in both teams. But in the space of just 4 minutes, Bain scored a second goal and Bill McGarry put away a penalty, to leave Charlton 4–1 behind. Bob Ledger scored another goal for Huddersfield, giving them a 5–1 lead with less than half an hour of the match left. Charlton seemed lost, a man down and four goals in arrears, and an increasingly large number in the crowd turned towards the exits.

But then, Charlton drew back two goals in the next two minutes, with a Summers pass put into back of the Huddersfield net by Johnny "Buck" Ryan, and then Summers scoring a second goal with his weaker right foot, to leave Charlton two behind, 5–3. Huddersfield could not find a way to stop Charlton's probing attack on the increasingly treacherous pitch. Within 16 minutes of scoring his first goal, Summers completed his hat trick, again with his right foot, and Charlton were only one behind, 5–4. What remained of the home crowd had come alight, cheering their team on, and Summers scored his fourth goal and then his fifth, all right-footed, to give Charlton the lead for the first time in the match, 6–5, with just 9 minutes to play. Charlton had scored five goals in 18 minutes, the last three by Summers within the space of 8 minutes, and Charlton were still ten men against eleven. Huddersfield's manager Bill Shankly was nonplussed.

With 4 minutes left, Stan Howard found an equaliser for Huddersfield with a shot that deflected off Charlton defender John Hewie and past Willie Duff into his own goal, 6–6. With barely seconds left, Summers put in a final cross, which Ryan put past the Huddersfield goalkeeper Sandy Kennon. The referee blew his whistle moments after the restart, and Charlton had won a famous victory, 7–6. Ecstatic Charlton supporters invaded the pitch and carried their team from the field cheering. The team came back out into the main stand to accept their supporters' congratulations.

== Aftermath ==
Trotter commented: "Things had not been coming off for Summers so I moved him from inside-left to centre-forward. As a last resort, I switched him to outside-left, his last chance to make good. How well he took it!"

The result of this match allowed Charlton to climb to fourth place in the Second Division, and Huddersfield slipped down to thirteenth. Huddersfield would go on to end the season ninth in the Second Division. Charlton finished third, pipped to promotion by Blackburn Rovers by a single point, having lost their final match of the season 4–3 to Blackburn, when a draw would have seen Charlton promoted instead. Two weeks later, Huddersfield also met Charlton in the third round of the 1958 FA Cup. After a 2–2 draw at Huddersfield on 4 January 1958, Charlton won the replay in London on 8 January, 1–0, before a much larger crowd.

Within three years, Charlton were involved in another match in which their opponents scored six goals at The Valley but failed to win. On 22 October 1960, they hosted Middlesbrough in a Second Division match that finished 6–6, one of only two Football League matches in history to finish thus.

Summers also scored five goals in a Second Division game against Portsmouth in October 1960, but died of cancer in June 1962, aged just 34.

Notable members of the losing side were Ray Wilson, who went on to win domestic silverware with Everton and the World Cup with England, and Bill McGarry, who went on to manage Wolverhampton Wanderers to success including a Football League Cup triumph.

The match is remembered over 60 years later, and was chosen by The Observer in 2001 as the sole football representative in its list of the 10 greatest comebacks of all time in any sport, calling this match "the most remarkable comeback in football history".
