= 1957–58 Huddersfield Town A.F.C. season =

Huddersfield Town
1957–58 season
- Chairman: J. Bernard Newman
- Manager: Bill Shankly
- Stadium: Leeds Road
- Football League Second Division: 9th
- FA Cup: Third round (eliminated by Charlton Athletic)
- Top goalscorer: League: Les Massie (12); All: Les Massie (13)
- Highest home attendance: 21,662 vs Barnsley (9 November 1957)
- Lowest home attendance: 5,971 vs Bristol City (19 February 1958)
- Biggest win: 3–0 vs Doncaster Rovers (31 August 1957); 3–0 vs Ipswich Town (12 October 1957); 3–0 vs Notts County (18 January 1958)
- Biggest defeat: 0–5 vs Barnsley (21 August 1957)

Huddersfield Town's 1957–58 campaign was a fairly mediocre season for the Town under Bill Shankly, taking charge for his first full season at Leeds Road. The season will be best remembered for the match against Charlton Athletic at The Valley on 21 December 1957. The match finished 7–6 to Charlton, after Charlton had only ten men for the majority of the match and the fact that with 27 minutes remaining, Town were leading 5–1 before losing the match. This remains the only match in professional football where a team has scored 6 goals and went on to lose the match.

== Squad at the start of the season ==
Note: Flags indicate national team as defined under FIFA eligibility rules; some limited exceptions apply. Players may hold more than one non-FIFA nationality.

Pos.	Nation	Player
GK	ENG	Harry Fearnley
GK	RSA	Sandy Kennon
DF	ENG	John Battye
DF	ENG	Ron Cockerill
DF	ENG	John Coddington
DF	ENG	Jack Connor
DF	ENG	Tony Conwell
DF	ENG	Brian Gibson
DF	ENG	Bill McGarry
DF	ENG	Ken Taylor

Pos.	Nation	Player
DF	ENG	Ray Wilson
MF	ENG	Bob Ledger
MF	ENG	Kevin McHale
MF	ENG	Vic Metcalfe
FW	SCO	Alex Bain
FW	ENG	Stan Hepton
FW	ENG	Stan Howard
FW	SCO	Denis Law
FW	SCO	Les Massie
FW	ENG	Ron Simpson

== Review ==
In Bill Shankly's first full season in charge, the team experienced a mixture of results, ultimately finishing the season in 9th place with 44 points, 12 points behind 2nd placed Blackburn Rovers. The season also saw Vic Metcalfe make his last appearance in a Town shirt in March against Sheffield United.

A significant highlight of the season was the match against Charlton Athletic at The Valley on 21 December 1957. Despite playing with only ten men for the majority of the match, Charlton claimed a 7–6 victory. Notably, with only 27 minutes remaining, Town were leading 5–1 before they went on to lose the match. This remains the only match in professional football, where a team has scored 6 goals and still lost. Incredibly, Town and Charlton played each other 4 times that season, and 24 goals were scored in those matches.

== Squad at the end of the season ==
Note: Flags indicate national team as defined under FIFA eligibility rules; some limited exceptions apply. Players may hold more than one non-FIFA nationality.

Pos.	Nation	Player
GK	ENG	Harry Fearnley
GK	RSA	Sandy Kennon
DF	ENG	John Battye
DF	ENG	Ron Cockerill
DF	ENG	John Coddington
DF	ENG	Jack Connor
DF	ENG	Tony Conwell
DF	ENG	Brian Gibson
DF	SCO	Gordon Low
DF	ENG	Bill McGarry
DF	ENG	Ken Taylor

Pos.	Nation	Player
DF	ENG	Ray Wilson
MF	ENG	Bob Ledger
MF	ENG	Kevin McHale
MF	ENG	Vic Metcalfe
FW	SCO	Alex Bain
FW	ENG	Tony France
FW	ENG	Stan Hepton
FW	ENG	Stan Howard
FW	SCO	Denis Law
FW	SCO	Les Massie
FW	ENG	Ron Simpson

== Results ==
=== Division Two ===
Date	Opponents	Home/ Away	Result F – A	Scorers	Attendance	Position
24 August 1957	Charlton Athletic	H	3–3	Bain, Simpson, Taylor	16,921	11th
28 August 1957	Liverpool	A	1–1	Massie	41,447	11th
31 August 1957	Doncaster Rovers	A	3–0	Massie (2), Simpson	14,631	7th
4 September 1957	Liverpool	H	2–1	Howard (2)	16,614	4th
7 September 1957	Rotherham United	H	1–3	Bain	20,414	9th
11 September 1957	Cardiff City	A	0–1		10,073	12th
14 September 1957	Notts County	A	1–1	Bain	15,584	12th
18 September 1957	Cardiff City	H	1–1	Baker (og)	9,821	11th
21 September 1957	Grimsby Town	A	1–4	Hepton	14,380	14th
28 September 1957	Stoke City	H	1–0	Connor	12,467	11th
5 October 1957	Bristol City	A	3–1	Wilson, Massie, Bain	21,341	10th
12 October 1957	Ipswich Town	H	3–0	Deacon (og), McHale, Bain	15,276	8th
19 October 1957	Blackburn Rovers	A	1–1	Massie	20,606	7th
26 October 1957	Sheffield United	H	1–1	Cockerill	17,149	7th
2 November 1957	West Ham United	A	2–5	Connor, Cockerill	21,525	10th
9 November 1957	Barnsley	H	0–5		21,662	11th
16 November 1957	Fulham	A	1–2	Bain	18,243	12th
23 November 1957	Swansea Town	H	2–2	Simpson, McGarry	12,860	13th
30 November 1957	Derby County	A	4–2	Law (2, 1 pen), Massie, Simpson	20,566	12th
7 December 1957	Bristol Rovers	H	0–0		11,028	12th
14 December 1957	Lincoln City	A	1–1	Law	8,473	11th
21 December 1957	Charlton Athletic	A	6–7	Massie, Bain (2), McGarry (pen), Ledger, Howard	12,535	13th
25 December 1957	Middlesbrough	H	1–0	Massie	16,281	11th
26 December 1957	Middlesbrough	A	1–0	Ledger	22,964	10th
28 December 1957	Doncaster Rovers	H	2–2	Ledger, Howard	16,682	11th
11 January 1958	Rotherham United	A	1–1	Connor	8,833	12th
18 January 1958	Notts County	H	3–0	Simpson, France, McGarry	9,173	10th
1 February 1958	Grimsby Town	H	1–0	Simpson	14,333	8th
8 February 1958	Stoke City	A	1–1	Simpson	16,489	9th
19 February 1958	Bristol City	H	0–0		5,971	8th
22 February 1958	Swansea Town	A	1–1	Law	13,400	7th
5 March 1958	Blackburn Rovers	H	2–1	McGarry, Massie	6,431	5th
8 March 1958	Sheffield United	A	2–3	Law, McGarry (pen)	19,834	8th
15 March 1958	West Ham United	H	3–1	Ledger (2), Simpson	19,093	7th
22 March 1958	Barnsley	A	3–2	Massie, McHale, Simpson	16,549	7th
29 March 1958	Fulham	H	0–3		19,215	8th
4 April 1958	Leyton Orient	A	1–3	Massie	16,840	8th
5 April 1958	Ipswich Town	A	0–4		15,712	10th
8 April 1958	Leyton Orient	H	2–0	Massie, McGarry	14,886	9th
12 April 1958	Derby County	H	0–0		12,441	9th
19 April 1958	Bristol Rovers	A	1–1	Low	16,185	7th
26 April 1958	Lincoln City	H	0–1		8,464	9th

=== FA Cup ===
Date	Round	Opponents	Home/ Away	Result F – A	Scorers	Attendance
4 January 1958	Round 3	Charlton Athletic	H	2–2	Law, Massie	20,223
8 January 1958	Round 3 Replay	Charlton Athletic	A	0–1		26,637

== Appearances and goals ==
Name	Nationality	Position	League		FA Cup		Total	
Name	Nationality	Position	Apps	Goals	Apps	Goals	Apps	Goals
Alex Bain	Scotland	FW	19	8	1	0	20	8
John Battye	England	DF	1	0	0	0	1	0
Ron Cockerill	England	DF	19	1	0	0	19	1
John Coddington	England	DF	3	0	0	0	3	0
Jack Connor	England	DF	31	3	2	0	33	3
Tony Conwell	England	DF	31	1	0	0	31	1
Harry Fearnley	England	GK	3	0	0	0	3	0
Tony France	England	FW	4	1	0	0	4	1
Brian Gibson	England	DF	19	0	2	0	21	0
Stan Hepton	England	MF	5	1	0	0	5	1
Stan Howard	England	MF	13	4	1	0	14	4
Sandy Kennon	South Africa	GK	39	0	2	0	41	0
Denis Law	Scotland	MF	18	5	2	1	20	6
Bob Ledger	England	MF	21	5	1	0	22	5
Gordon Low	Scotland	DF	5	1	0	0	5	1
Les Massie	Scotland	FW	39	12	2	1	41	13
Bill McGarry	England	DF	34	6	2	0	36	6
Kevin McHale	England	MF	23	2	1	0	24	2
Vic Metcalfe	England	MF	23	0	0	0	23	0
Ron Simpson	England	FW	41	9	2	0	43	9
Ken Taylor	England	DF	40	1	2	0	42	1
Ray Wilson	England	DF	31	1	2	0	33	1
