= Stan Howard =

Stan Howard is the name of:

- Stan Howard (Australian footballer)
- Stan Howard (English footballer)
