= United Trinity =

Three Manchester United players in 1968

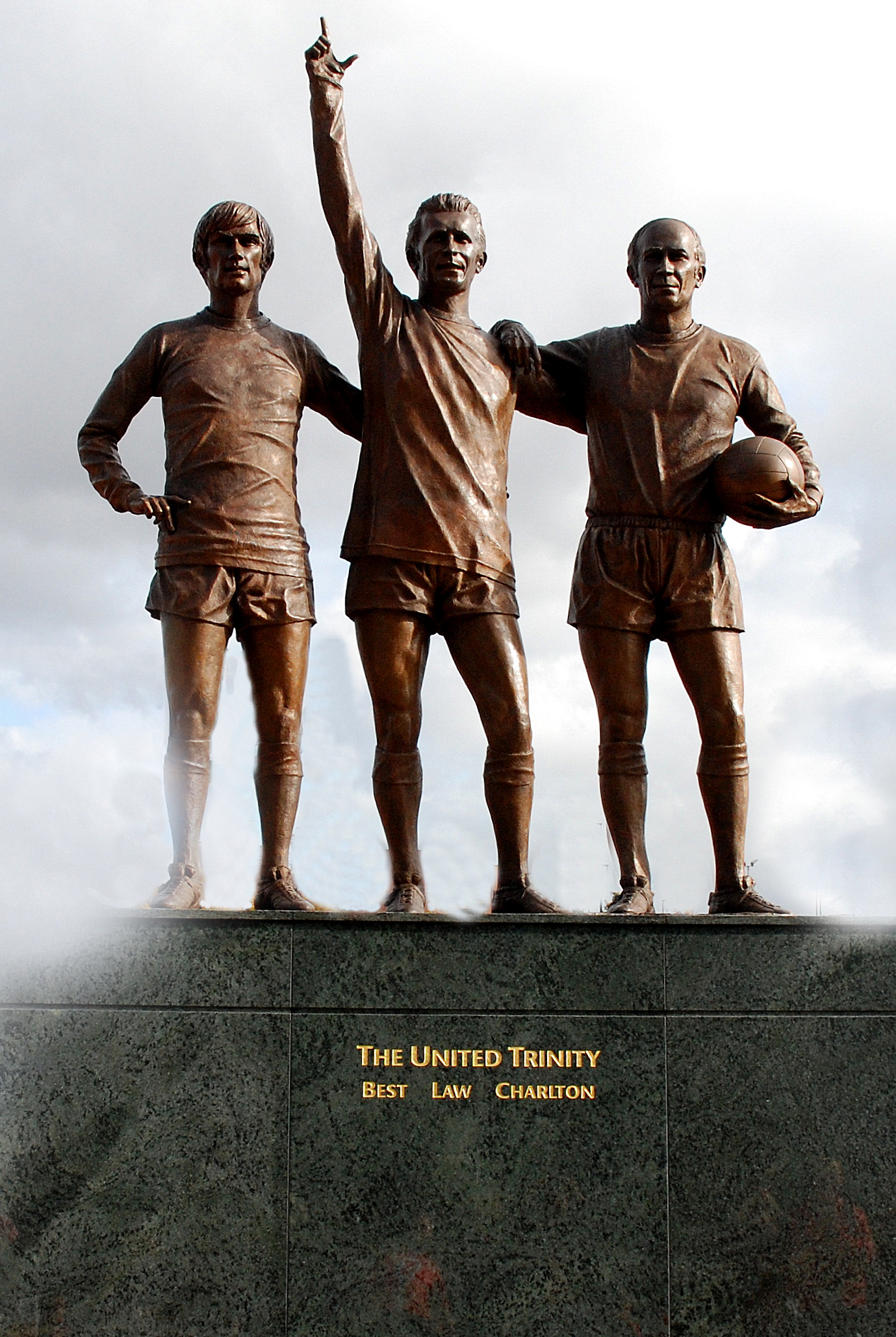
Statue outside Old Trafford depicting the United Trinity: Best, Law and Charlton

In association football, the United Trinity or the Holy Trinity refers to the Manchester United trio of George Best, Denis Law and Bobby Charlton, who helped United become the first ever English club team to win the European Cup in 1968.

Charlton was a member of the Busby Babes, a group of talented young players brought through the club's academy by the eponymous manager Matt Busby and his assistant Jimmy Murphy, as well as club scout Joe Armstrong, who discovered Charlton in 1953 and Best in 1961, among others. Law arrived at the club from Italian team Torino for a club record £115,000 in 1962, having previously played for Huddersfield Town and rivals Manchester City.

Charlton made his debut on 6 October 1956, scoring twice in a 4–2 win against Charlton Athletic. Law made his debut on 18 August 1962, scoring in a 2–2 with West Bromwich Albion. Although Best made his debut against West Bromwich Albion on 14 September 1963, it wouldn't be until the reverse fixture on 18 January 1964 when all three would feature in the same starting line-up; a 4–1 victory in which all three scored, with Law scoring two of them.

Throughout the 1960s all three would be voted as the winner of the Ballon d'Or, the trophy awarded to the world's best player. Law won in 1964, Charlton in 1966 and Best in 1968. Since then, only Cristiano Ronaldo has won the award while playing for United, winning in 2008. Combined, the players scored 665 goals in 1633 games. Manager Bill Shankly regaled how he once psychologically built up his Liverpool team ahead of a game against United; "I took the models of Bobby Charlton, Denis Law and George Best off the model pitch and put them in my left-hand pocket. Then I told our players: 'Don't worry about them, they can't play at all.' It was psychology, of course. Charlton, Best and Law were three of the best players in the world".

Right away, you could see the great chemistry between them. Great players know how to play together. However tough the match was, you always knew Bobby could unleash one of his strikes from God-knows-where, Denis would make something out of nothing inside the box or George would just do something magical.

— Paddy Crerand.

Best died on 25 November 2005, with Law and Charlton amongst the last to visit him in hospital. A year later, it was announced that a statue of the trio would be erected outside Old Trafford, which was eventually unveiled in 2008.

In subsequent years, various triumvirates have been dubbed the new Trinity, including academy graduates and one-club men Ryan Giggs–Paul Scholes–Gary Neville, who played in the senior team together between 1992 and 2011 and Cristiano Ronaldo–Wayne Rooney–Carlos Tevez, who played together at United when the team won the Premier League and reached the UEFA Champions League final in 2008 and 2009.

The statue of the Trinity featured in the design of Manchester United's 2017–18 third shirt.

Charlton died on 21 October 2023. Law died on 17 January 2025.
