= Fred Lucas (footballer) =

English footballer and cricketer

Personal information
- Full name: Frederick Charles Lucas
- Date of birth: 29 September 1933
- Place of birth: Slade Green, Kent
- Date of death: 11 September 2015 (aged 81)
- Place of death: Woolwich, London
- Height: 1.73 m (5 ft 8 in)
- Position: Wing half

Senior career*
Years	Team	Apps	(Gls)
1955–1964	Charlton Athletic	185	(29)
1964–1965	Crystal Palace	16	(0)
Total		201	(29)
- Cricket career
Cricket information
- Batting: Right-handed
- Bowling: Right-arm off-spin
Domestic team information
- Years: Team
- 1954: Kent
Career statistics
Competition	First-class
Matches	2
Runs scored	62
Batting average	13.50
100s/50s	0/0
Top score	38
Balls bowled	18
Wickets	0
Bowling average	–
5 wickets in innings	–
10 wickets in match	–
Best bowling	–
Catches/stumpings	1/–
- Source: CricInfo, 24 October 2018
- * Club domestic league appearances and goals

Frederick Charles Lucas (29 September 1933 – 11 September 2015) was an English footballer who played as a wing half and inside forward in the Football League, primarily for Charlton Athletic. He was a good all-round sportsman and played two first-class cricket matches for Kent County Cricket Club in 1954.

Lucas was born at Slade Green in Kent in 1933 and educated at Erith Grammar School. He was an "outstanding all-round sportsman" at school and left at 14 to join Charlton, working in the club's offices until he was able to sign as a professional after his 17th birthday. He joined the staff at Kent County Cricket Club in 1950 and played five Second XI games during the season before taking 25 wickets and winning his Second XI county cap in 1951.

He served in the Royal Electrical and Mechanical Engineers (REME) on national service between 1951 and 1953 but found the opportunity to play cricket limited, although he did play football for REME. He was called into the Kent First XI in 1954 and made two first-class appearances for the side but was released at the end of the season. Lucas also rejoined Charlton after being demobilised and enjoyed a "rather more successful" career as a footballer, making 185 appearances for the team between 1956 and 1964, scoring 29 goals. He played in the 1957 match between Charlton and Huddersfield Town which finished 7–6 to Charlton, setting up John Ryan's winner with a minute left. Charlton had been 1–5 down with 27 minutes remaining and with Derek Ufton, also a Kent cricketer, unable to play on after an injury.

Lucas moved to Crystal Palace in 1964 and joined concrete company Readymix Corporation Group as a sales executive on his retirement in 1969. He retired in 1998 and died, aged 81, at Woolwich in September 2015.
