= Andy Townsend =

Irish footballer (born 1963)

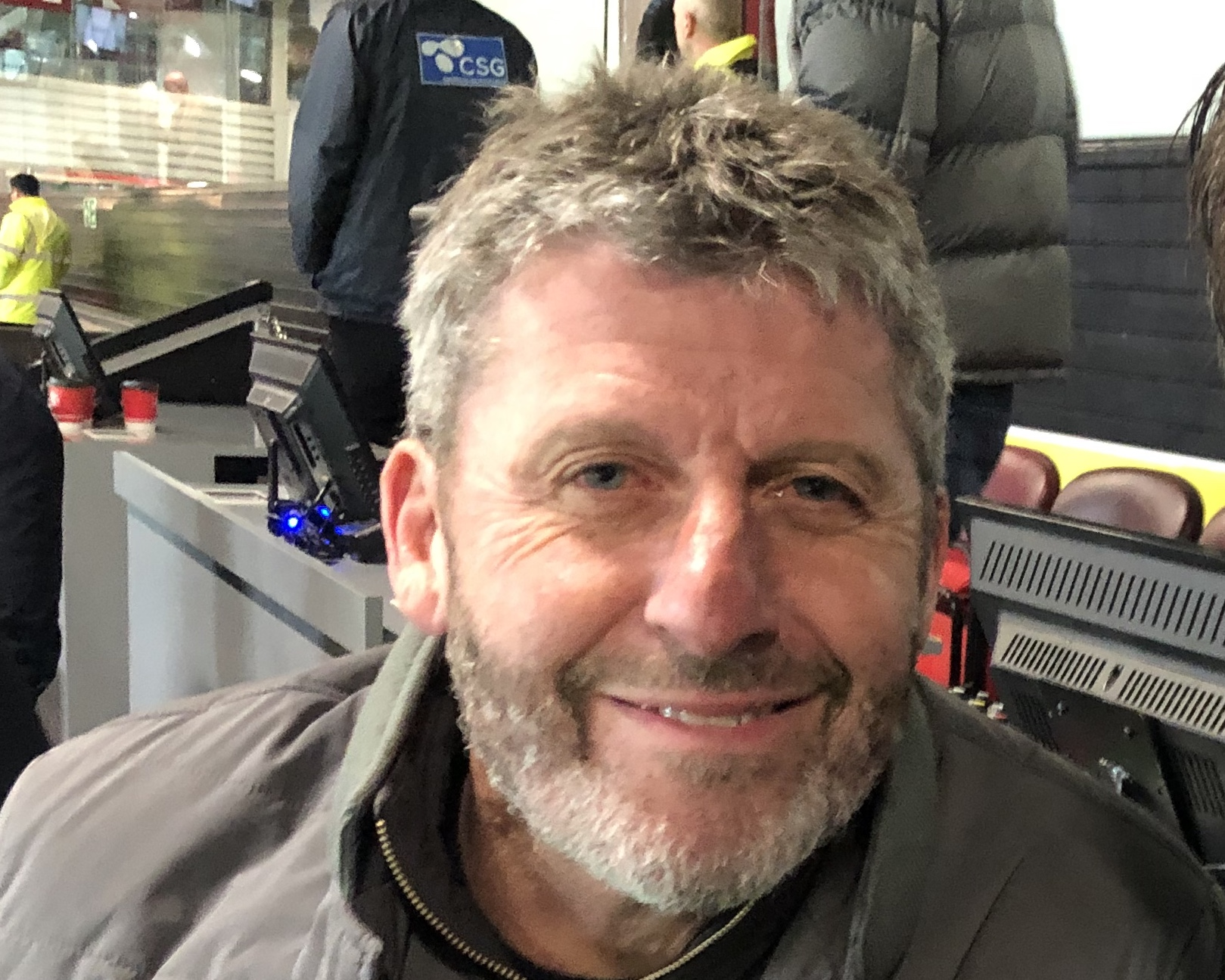
- Townsend in 2020

Personal information
- Full name: Andrew David Townsend
- Date of birth: 23 July 1963 (age 63)
- Place of birth: Maidstone, England
- Height: 5 ft 11 in (1.80 m)
- Position: Midfielder

Youth career
- Welling United

Senior career*
Years	Team	Apps	(Gls)
1980–1984	Welling United	105	(n/a)
1984–1985	Weymouth	40	(16)
1985–1988	Southampton	83	(5)
1988–1990	Norwich City	71	(8)
1990–1993	Chelsea	110	(12)
1993–1997	Aston Villa	134	(8)
1997–1999	Middlesbrough	77	(3)
1999–2000	West Bromwich Albion	18	(0)
Total		638	(52)

International career
1994	Republic of Ireland B	1	(0)
1989–1997	Republic of Ireland	70	(7)
- * Club domestic league appearances and goals

Andrew David Townsend (born 23 July 1963) is a former professional footballer and sports co-commentator for Premier League Productions and CBS Sports.

As a player he was a midfielder who notably played in the Premier League for Chelsea, Aston Villa and Middlesbrough. He also played in the Football League for Southampton, Norwich City and West Bromwich Albion. Prior to his professional career he had spent four years in Non-League with Welling United. Despite being born in England, Townsend played in World Cups for the Republic of Ireland national team, making 70 appearances and scoring seven goals.

Following retirement, Townsend moved into sports commentary and was ITV Sport's co-commentator for all of their major coverage of games until 2015. He has also commentated for BT Sport, Talksport and BBC Radio 5 Live.

== Early life ==
Townsend was born in Maidstone, Kent, but grew up in Bexley, where he attended Upton Primary School in Bexleyheath, followed by Bexleyheath School. He is the son of former Charlton Athletic and Crystal Palace footballer Don Townsend.

== Club career ==
He began his playing career in August 1980 with Welling United in the Athenian League, while working as an ICL computer operator for Greenwich Borough Council in south-east London. After making 105 appearances for Welling, he was signed by Weymouth in March 1984 for £13,500.

=== Southampton ===
In January 1985, Townsend was signed by Lawrie McMenemy at First Division Southampton for £35,000 and made his professional debut at home to Aston Villa on 20 April 1985 as Southampton qualified for Europe, only to be banned in the aftermath of the Heysel Stadium disaster.

Over the next season, he was in and out of the team (then managed by Chris Nicholl) but broke his leg in a pre-season friendly against his old club Weymouth in August 1986. He fought his way back to fitness and rejoined the side the following January.

In the 1987–88 he was a virtual ever-present, playing alongside Jimmy Case and Glenn Cockerill in the Southampton midfield. He was a hard-tackling, hard-working midfielder with an eye for goal. It was a shock, therefore, when Nicholl sold him to First Division rivals Norwich City in August 1988, for a fee of £300,000.

=== Norwich City ===
Townsend made his debut as a substitute against Middlesbrough on 3 September 1988, before replacing the suspended Trevor Putney for his first full appearance in a 3–1 win over Spurs on 22 October. He retained his place in the Norwich midfield and ended the season with 36 league appearances (5 as substitute) with five goals. He also made six FA Cup appearances with two goals against Port Vale in the Third Round on 7 January 1989. Under manager Dave Stringer, he was a member of the Canaries' 1988–89 side that finished fourth in the top flight and reached the semi-finals of the FA Cup. At the season's end, Townsend was shortlisted for the PFA Players' Player of the Year award, which was won by Mark Hughes.

Norwich made a handsome profit when they let Townsend join Chelsea for £1,200,000 in July 1990.

=== Premier League ===
After making a total of 138 appearances for Chelsea, scoring 12 goals but winning no trophies (they never finished higher than 11th in the league while he was there), Townsend transferred to Aston Villa in July 1993 for £2.1million.

Aged 30, Townsend made his debut on 14 August in a 4–1 home victory over QPR. Townsend finally won some silverware when Villa won the 1994 League Cup, beating Manchester United 3–1. He captained Villa when they reclaimed the trophy in 1996 with a 3–0 victory over Leeds United.

In August 1997, under Brian Little, he made his last appearance in a 2–3 defeat against Spurs at White Hart Lane. He transferred to Bryan Robson's Middlesbrough that month for £500,000, having made 134 league appearances for the Villans, scoring eight league goals.

=== Later career ===
Townsend made 37 appearances in his first season on Teesside, scoring twice as Boro' won promotion to the Premier League. In the 1998–99 season, he formed a useful partnership with Paul Gascoigne as Middlesbrough finished comfortably in mid-table in their first season back in the Premier League.

In the following season, he found it harder to get into the first team and on 17 September 1999 he moved down a division to West Bromwich Albion for £50,000. Townsend's high wage demands prevented a move back to Norwich or a loan spell with non-league Boston United.

In his one season at West Bromwich Albion he only made 17 league appearances before a recurrent knee injury forced his retirement in July 2000, after a season in which Albion narrowly avoided relegation to Division Two.

"I was very flattered by Albion's offer. I thought long and hard about it but I just felt that if I am going to go down the road of management I am going to have to do things my own way."

— Townsend rejects Albion manager Gary Megson's offer of a coaching role at the club.

On 21 April 2016, Townsend joined Bolton Wanderers as a consultant.

== International career ==
His contribution to Norwich's successful season saw Townsend selected for the Republic of Ireland, making his debut against France in February 1989. He qualified for Ireland due to his Irish family heritage, with a grandmother who came from Kerry.

He played in the next year's World Cup, in Italy, where he played in all five of Ireland's matches. They reached the quarter-finals, the country's strongest ever campaign. The Irish drew their three group matches – against England, Egypt and the Netherlands. Scoring a penalty in the shoot-out with Romania, his country were eventually sunk by a Salvatore Schillaci goal for the hosts. They had conceded just three goals in those five games. They had scored just two goals in those five games.

He was captain of the Ireland squad for the 1994 World Cup. All four teams of Group E finished on four points, they got their revenge on the Italians, but were defeated by Mexico and drew with Norway. Ireland lost 2–0 to the Dutch at the Citrus Bowl in the knock-out stage.

On 22 March 2015, Townsend was inducted into the FAI Hall of Fame.

== Broadcasting career ==
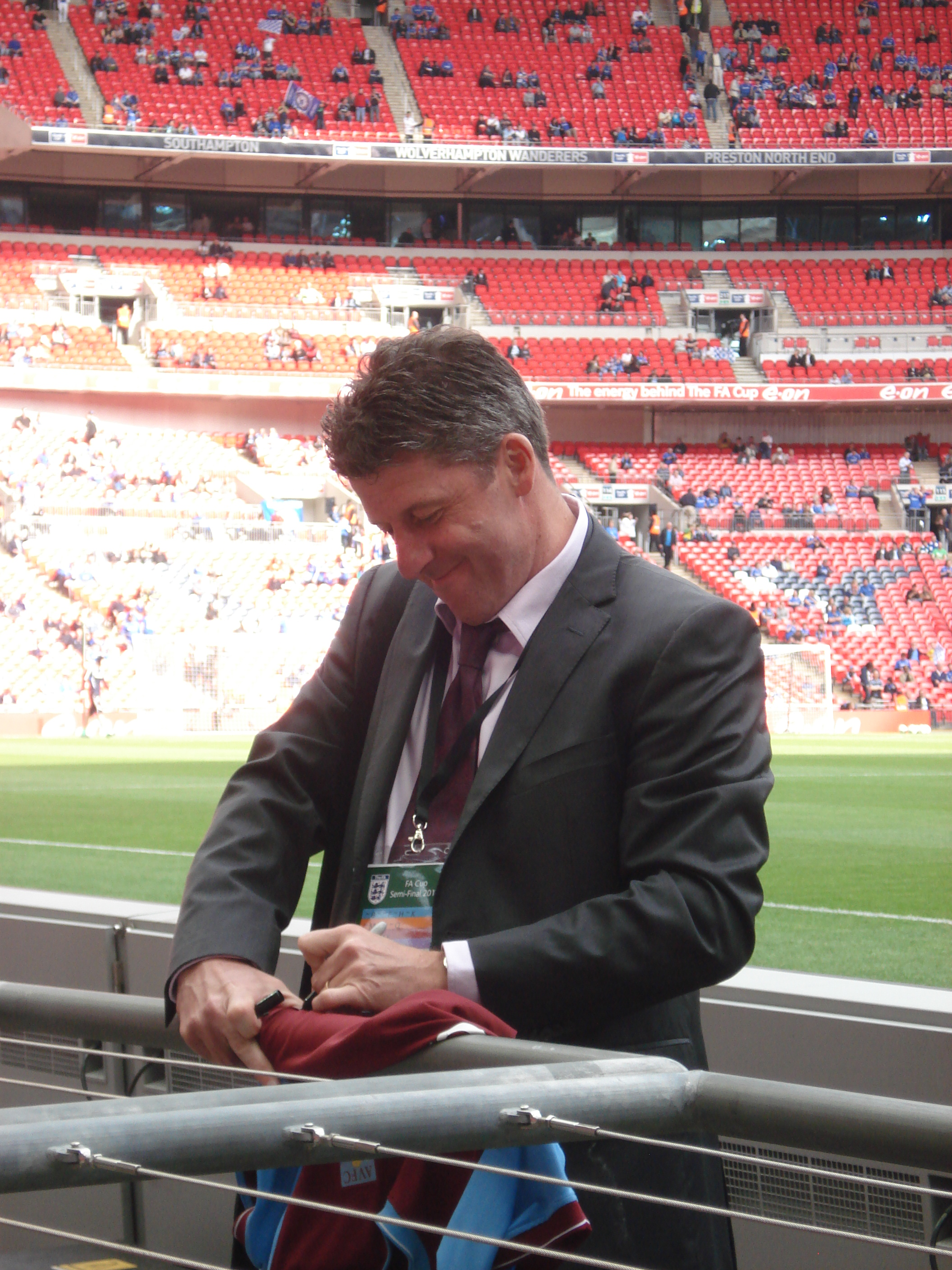
Townsend signing an autograph at the 2010 FA Cup Semifinal.

=== ITV Sport ===
Townsend's most prominent role was as part of ITV Sport's live Champions League, FA Cup and England internationals coverage. He took over from Ron Atkinson as the channel's lead co-commentator, forming a long-running partnership with main commentator Clive Tyldesley, as well as appearing as a studio pundit. He co-hosted talkSPORT's Weekend Sports Breakfast on Sundays with Mike Parry, and hosted the station's drive-time show on Fridays. He also hosted the mid morning discussion on talkSPORT from 10 am to 1 pm from Monday to Friday, having replaced Jon Gaunt, who was sacked for calling a guest a Nazi. He left the station because he no longer wanted to commute from his Midlands home to the London studio. He also hosted ITV1's regional programme Soccer Night, alongside Peter Beagrie. Between 2001 and 2004, Townsend was part of ITV's coverage of the Premier League after they won the rights from the BBC to show top flight football on Saturday evening. In January 2015 ITV confirmed that Townsend, along with presenter Adrian Chiles, would not be retained by the broadcaster after the expiry of his contract in the summer of 2015, with the channel having lost Champions League broadcasting rights.

=== BT Sport ===
After leaving ITV in 2015 he joined BT Sport as a co-commentator for their coverage of the Premier League, FA Cup, UEFA Champions League and UEFA Europa League. He made his co-commentating debut on 15 February 2015, co-commentating on Arsenal vs Middlesbrough in the FA Cup fifth round alongside Ian Darke.

=== Other work ===
He has also presented BBC Radio 5 Live and written columns for the Daily Mail. He has also been the commentator on several EA football games with Clive Tyldesley including 2006 FIFA World Cup, UEFA Champions League 2006-2007, UEFA Euro 2008, 2010 FIFA World Cup South Africa, UEFA Euro 2012, 2014 FIFA World Cup Brazil and most recently FIFA 12 to this game FIFA 17.

== Personal life ==
He is the son of former Charlton Athletic and Crystal Palace defender Don Townsend.

Townsend was a consultant for Harlequin Property, where he helped set up football schools at their Caribbean resorts. In October 2019, he was set to join Port Vale as a football advisor to work on player recruitment as part of the firm's ultimately unrealised plans to invest in the club.

He is patron of the George Coller Memorial Fund. He ran in the Great North Run in 2007, finishing in a time of 2 hours and 20 minutes.

== Honours ==
Aston Villa

- Football League Cup: 1993–94, 1995–96

Middlesbrough

- Football League First Division runner-up: 1997–98
- Football League Cup runner-up: 1997–98

Individual

- Norwich City Hall of Fame
- PFA Team of the Year: 1988–89 First Division, 1990–91 First Division, 1991–92 First Division
- Chelsea Player of the Year: 1991
- FAI Hall of Fame: Inducted 2015
- FAI Senior International Player of the Year: 1995

Sporting positions
Preceded by Kevin Richardson	Aston Villa captain 1995 – 1997	Succeeded by Gareth Southgate
Preceded by Nigel Pearson	Middlesbrough captain 1998 – 1999	Succeeded by Paul Ince
