= Alex Bain (footballer) =

Scottish footballer

Personal information
- Full name: Alexander Edward Bain
- Date of birth: 22 January 1936
- Place of birth: Edinburgh, Scotland
- Date of death: 2014 (aged 78)
- Place of death: Camden, London, England
- Height: 1.75 m (5 ft 9 in)
- Position: Forward

Senior career*
Years	Team	Apps	(Gls)
1954–1957	Motherwell	23	(10)
1957–1959	Huddersfield Town	29	(11)
1959–1960	Chesterfield	18	(9)
1960–1961	Falkirk	9	(7)
1961–1962	Bournemouth & Boscombe Athletic	8	(4)
1962–1963	Falkirk	9	(5)
Total		96	(46)
- * Club domestic league appearances and goals

Alexander Edward Bain (22 January 1936 – 2014) was a professional footballer, who played for teams in both Scotland and England.

He scored two goals for in an extraordinary match between Charlton Athletic and Huddersfield Town that took place on 21 December 1957 at Charlton Athletic's home ground, The Valley. Charlton played most of the match with 10 men after their captain Derek Ufton was injured, and Huddersfield were leading 5–1 with just 27 minutes remaining. At that point, Johnny Summers began an extraordinary passage of play in which he scored five goals and assisted with two others to allow Charlton to win 7–6. Huddersfield become the first, and still the only, team to score six goals in an English Football League match – or indeed any other professional football match – and still be on the losing side.
