= 1968–69 Manchester United F.C. season =

English football club season

Manchester United F.C.
1968–69 season
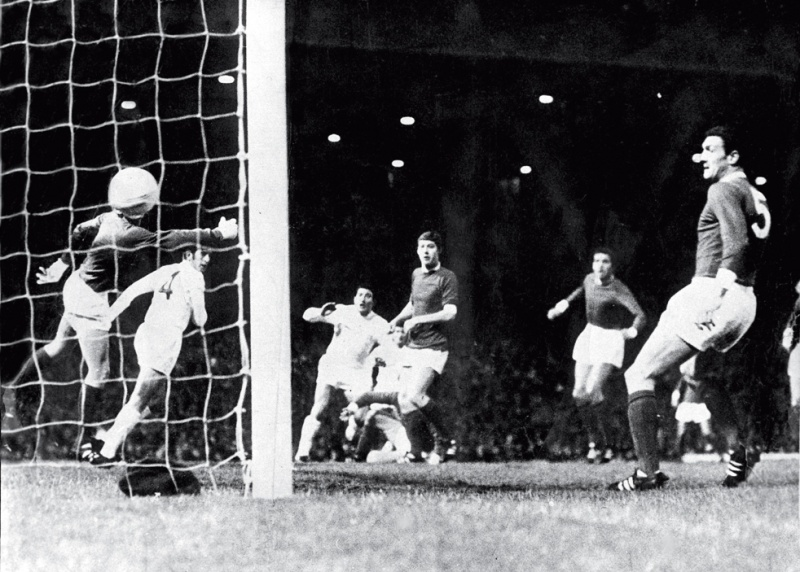
- Juan Ramón Verón scores against United (in dark shirts) in the 1968 Intercontinental Cup.
- Chairman: Louis Edwards
- Manager: Matt Busby
- First Division: 11th
- FA Cup: Sixth Round
- European Cup: Semi-finals
- Intercontinental Cup: Runners-up
- Top goalscorer: League: George Best (19); All: Denis Law (30)
- Highest home attendance: 63,500 vs Estudiantes de La Plata (16 October 1968)
- Lowest home attendance: 36,638 vs Queens Park Rangers (19 March 1969)
- Average home league attendance: 53,271
| Home colours | Away colours | Third colours |

The 1968–69 season was Manchester United's 67th season in the Football League, and their 24th consecutive season in the top division of English football. After the end of the season, on 4 June 1969, United manager Matt Busby stepped down as manager after 24 years; he had announced his intention to retire on 14 January. He was replaced with Wilf McGuinness who only managed the team for a year and a half before Matt Busby returned as United manager for another six months.

George Best was United's top goalscorer in the league with 19 goals, although Denis Law added to his 14 league goals with a further 16 in the cups to reach a grand total of 30 goals in all competitions to top the club's goalscoring charts.

United finished 11th in the First Division this season, and were semi-finalists in the European Cup.

== First Division ==
| Date | Opponents | H / A | Result F–A | Scorers | Attendance |
|---|---|---|---|---|---|
| 10 August 1968 | Everton | H | 2–1 | Best, Charlton | 61,311 |
| 14 August 1968 | West Bromwich Albion | A | 1–3 | Charlton | 38,299 |
| 17 August 1968 | Manchester City | A | 0–0 | | 63,052 |
| 21 August 1968 | Coventry City | H | 1–0 | Ryan | 51,201 |
| 24 August 1968 | Chelsea | H | 0–4 | | 55,114 |
| 28 August 1968 | Tottenham Hotspur | H | 3–1 | Fitzpatrick (2), Beal (o.g.) | 57,380 |
| 31 August 1968 | Sheffield Wednesday | A | 4–5 | Law (2), Best, Charlton | 50,490 |
| 7 September 1968 | West Ham United | H | 1–1 | Law | 63,274 |
| 14 September 1968 | Burnley | A | 0–1 | | 32,935 |
| 21 September 1968 | Newcastle United | H | 3–1 | Best (2), Law | 47,262 |
| 5 October 1968 | Arsenal | H | 0–0 | | 61,843 |
| 9 October 1968 | Tottenham Hotspur | A | 2–2 | Crerand, Law | 56,205 |
| 12 October 1968 | Liverpool | A | 0–2 | | 53,392 |
| 19 October 1968 | Southampton | H | 1–2 | Best | 46,526 |
| 26 October 1968 | Queens Park Rangers | A | 3–2 | Best (2), Law | 31,138 |
| 2 November 1968 | Leeds United | H | 0–0 | | 53,839 |
| 9 November 1968 | Sunderland | A | 1–1 | Hurley (o.g.) | 33,151 |
| 16 November 1968 | Ipswich Town | H | 0–0 | | 45,796 |
| 23 November 1968 | Stoke City | A | 0–0 | | 30,562 |
| 30 November 1968 | Wolverhampton Wanderers | H | 2–0 | Best, Law | 50,165 |
| 7 December 1968 | Leicester City | A | 1–2 | Law | 36,303 |
| 14 December 1968 | Liverpool | H | 1–0 | Law | 55,354 |
| 21 December 1968 | Southampton | A | 0–2 | | 26,194 |
| 26 December 1968 | Arsenal | A | 0–3 | | 62,300 |
| 11 January 1969 | Leeds United | A | 1–2 | Charlton | 48,145 |
| 18 January 1969 | Sunderland | H | 4–1 | Law (3), Best | 45,670 |
| 1 February 1969 | Ipswich Town | A | 0–1 | | 30,837 |
| 15 February 1969 | Wolverhampton Wanderers | A | 2–2 | Best, Charlton | 44,023 |
| 8 March 1969 | Manchester City | H | 0–1 | | 63,264 |
| 10 March 1969 | Everton | A | 0–0 | | 57,514 |
| 15 March 1969 | Chelsea | A | 2–3 | James, Law | 60,436 |
| 19 March 1969 | Queens Park Rangers | H | 8–1 | Morgan (3), Best (2), Aston, Kidd, Stiles | 36,638 |
| 22 March 1969 | Sheffield Wednesday | H | 1–0 | Best | 45,527 |
| 24 March 1969 | Stoke City | H | 1–1 | Aston | 39,931 |
| 29 March 1969 | West Ham United | A | 0–0 | | 41,546 |
| 31 March 1969 | Nottingham Forest | A | 1–0 | Best | 41,892 |
| 2 April 1969 | West Bromwich Albion | H | 2–1 | Best (2) | 38,846 |
| 5 April 1969 | Nottingham Forest | H | 3–1 | Morgan (2), Best | 51,952 |
| 8 April 1969 | Coventry City | A | 1–2 | Fitzpatrick | 45,402 |
| 12 April 1969 | Newcastle United | A | 0–2 | | 46,379 |
| 19 April 1969 | Burnley | H | 2–0 | Best, Waldron (o.g.) | 52,626 |
| 17 May 1969 | Leicester City | H | 3–2 | Best, Law, Morgan | 45,860 |

| Pos | Team | Pld | W | D | L | GF | GA | GAv | Pts | Qualification or relegation |
|---|---|---|---|---|---|---|---|---|---|---|
| 9 | Newcastle United | 42 | 15 | 14 | 13 | 61 | 55 | 1.109 | 44 | Qualification for the Inter-Cities Fairs Cup first round (Note: Newcastle United qualified for the Inter-Cities Fairs Cup as the 1968-69 Inter-Cities Fairs Cup winners) |
| 10 | West Bromwich Albion | 42 | 16 | 11 | 15 | 64 | 67 | 0.955 | 43 | |
| 11 | Manchester United | 42 | 15 | 12 | 15 | 57 | 53 | 1.075 | 42 | |
| 12 | Ipswich Town | 42 | 15 | 11 | 16 | 59 | 60 | 0.983 | 41 | |
| 13 | Manchester City | 42 | 15 | 10 | 17 | 64 | 55 | 1.164 | 40 | Qualification for the European Cup Winners' Cup first round (Note: Manchester City qualified for the European Cup Winners' Cup as the 1968-69 FA Cup winners.) |

Source: World Football
Rules for classification: 1) Points; 2) Goal average; 3) Goals scored

== FA Cup ==
| Date | Round | Opponents | H / A | Result F–A | Scorers | Attendance |
|---|---|---|---|---|---|---|
| 4 January 1969 | Round 3 | Exeter City | A | 3–1 | Fitzpatrick, Kidd, Newman (o.g.) | 18,500 |
| 25 January 1969 | Round 4 | Watford | H | 1–1 | Law | 63,498 |
| 3 February 1969 | Round 4 Replay | Watford | A | 2–0 | Law (2) | 34,000 |
| 8 February 1969 | Round 5 | Birmingham City | A | 2–2 | Best, Law | 52,500 |
| 24 February 1969 | Round 5 Replay | Birmingham City | H | 6–2 | Law (3), Crerand, Kidd, Morgan | 61,932 |
| 1 March 1969 | Round 6 | Everton | H | 0–1 | | 63,464 |

== European Cup ==
| Date | Round | Opponents | H / A | Result F–A | Scorers | Attendance |
|---|---|---|---|---|---|---|
| 18 September 1968 | Round 1 First leg | Waterford United | A | 3–1 | Law (3) | 48,000 |
| 2 October 1968 | Round 1 Second leg | Waterford United | H | 7–1 | Law (4), Burns, Charlton, Stiles | 41,750 |
| 13 November 1968 | Round 2 First leg | Anderlecht | H | 3–0 | Law (2), Kidd | 51,000 |
| 27 November 1968 | Round 2 Second leg | Anderlecht | A | 1–3 | Sartori | 40,000 |
| 26 February 1969 | Quarter-final; First leg | Rapid Wien | H | 3–0 | Best (2), Morgan | 61,932 |
| 5 March 1969 | Quarter-final; Second leg | Rapid Wien | A | 0–0 | | 52,000 |
| 23 April 1969 | Semi-final; First leg | Milan | A | 0–2 | | 80,000 |
| 15 May 1969 | Semi-final; Second leg | Milan | H | 1–0 | Charlton | 63,103 |

== Intercontinental Cup ==
| Date | Opponents | H / A | Result F–A | Scorers | Attendance |
|---|---|---|---|---|---|
| 25 September 1968 | Estudiantes de La Plata | A | 0–1 | | 55,000 |
| 16 October 1968 | Estudiantes de La Plata | H | 1–1 | Morgan | 63,500 |

== Squad statistics ==
| Pos. | Name | League | | FA Cup | | European Cup | | Other | | Total | |
| Pos. | Name | Apps | Goals | Apps | Goals | Apps | Goals | Apps | Goals | Apps | Goals |
|---|---|---|---|---|---|---|---|---|---|---|---|
| GK | (England) Jimmy Rimmer | 4 | 0 | 1 | 0 | 2(1) | 0 | 0 | 0 | 7(1) | 0 |
| GK | (England) Alex Stepney | 38 | 0 | 5 | 0 | 6 | 0 | 2 | 0 | 51 | 0 |
| FB | (Republic of Ireland) Shay Brennan | 13 | 0 | 0 | 0 | 3 | 0 | 1 | 0 | 17 | 0 |
| FB | (Scotland) Francis Burns | 14(2) | 0 | 1 | 0 | 3(1) | 1 | 1 | 0 | 19(3) | 1 |
| FB | (Republic of Ireland) Tony Dunne | 33 | 0 | 6 | 0 | 6 | 0 | 2 | 0 | 47 | 0 |
| FB | (Scotland) Frank Kopel | 7(1) | 0 | 1 | 0 | 1 | 0 | 0 | 0 | 9(1) | 0 |
| HB | (Scotland) Paddy Crerand | 35 | 1 | 4 | 1 | 8 | 0 | 2 | 0 | 49 | 2 |
| HB | (Scotland) John Fitzpatrick | 28(2) | 3 | 6 | 1 | 4 | 0 | 0 | 0 | 38(2) | 4 |
| HB | (England) Bill Foulkes | 10(3) | 0 | 0 | 0 | 5 | 0 | 2 | 0 | 17(3) | 0 |
| HB | (England) Steve James | 21 | 1 | 6 | 0 | 2 | 0 | 0 | 0 | 29 | 1 |
| HB | (England) Nobby Stiles | 41 | 1 | 6 | 0 | 8 | 1 | 1 | 0 | 56 | 2 |
| FW | (England) John Aston | 13 | 2 | 0 | 0 | 0 | 0 | 0 | 0 | 13 | 2 |
| FW | (Northern Ireland) George Best | 41 | 19 | 6 | 1 | 6 | 2 | 2 | 0 | 55 | 22 |
| FW | (England) Bobby Charlton | 32 | 5 | 6 | 0 | 8 | 2 | 2 | 0 | 48 | 7 |
| FW | (England) Alan Gowling | 2 | 0 | 0 | 0 | 0 | 0 | 0 | 0 | 2 | 0 |
| FW | (England) Brian Kidd | 28(1) | 1 | 5 | 2 | 7 | 1 | 1 | 0 | 41(1) | 4 |
| FW | (Scotland) Denis Law | 30 | 14 | 6 | 7 | 7 | 9 | 2 | 0 | 45 | 30 |
| FW | (Scotland) Willie Morgan | 29 | 6 | 5 | 1 | 4 | 1 | 2 | 1 | 40 | 9 |
| FW | (Scotland) Jimmy Ryan | 6 | 1 | 0 | 0 | 1 | 0 | 0 | 0 | 7 | 1 |
| FW | (England) David Sadler | 26(3) | 0 | 0(1) | 0 | 5 | 0 | 2 | 0 | 33(4) | 0 |
| FW | (Italy) Carlo Sartori | 11(2) | 0 | 2 | 0 | 2 | 1 | 0 | 0 | 15(2) | 1 |
