= John Ryan (footballer, born 1930) =

Scottish footballer

John Ryan (16 October 1930 – 12 August 2008) was a Scottish professional footballer. He played 61 league games for Charlton Athletic, scoring 32 goals. He played as a centre-forward, or as an outside-right.

He is most famous for scoring the winning goal in Charlton's 7–6 win over Huddersfield Town in the Second Division at The Valley, 21 December 1957, the only game in professional football in which a team has scored six times and still lost the game. What was even more remarkable about the game was that Charlton had 10 men for 73 minutes of the match and were 5–1 down with 27 minutes remaining. Ryan scored the winning goal past keeper Sandy Kennon with one minute remaining.

He died in Swindon, England on 12 August 2008.
