= Tom Daley (footballer) =

English footballer (1933–2020)

Personal information
- Date of birth: 15 November 1933
- Place of birth: Grimsby, England
- Date of death: 23 January 2020 (aged 86)
- Position: Goalkeeper

Senior career*
Years	Team	Apps	(Gls)
1951–1956	Grimsby Town	14	(0)
1956–1957	Huddersfield Town	1	(0)
1959–1960	Peterborough United	15	(0)

Managerial career
- 1960–1961: Gainsborough Trinity
- * Club domestic league appearances and goals

Thomas Daley (15 November 1933 – 23 January 2020) was a professional footballer born in Grimsby, Lincolnshire, who played as a goalkeeper in the Football League for Grimsby Town and Huddersfield Town. He later played for Peterborough United, Gainsborough Trinity and Boston United in non-league football.
