= Denis Law =

Scottish footballer (1940–2025)

Denis Law CBE
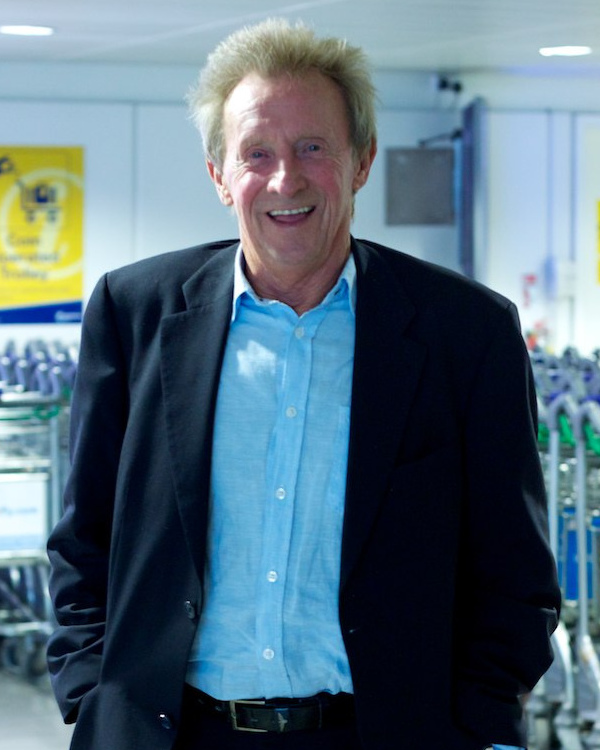
- Law in 2011

Personal information
- Full name: Denis Law
- Date of birth: 24 February 1940
- Place of birth: Aberdeen, Scotland
- Date of death: 17 January 2025 (aged 84)
- Place of death: Cheshire, England
- Height: 5 ft 9 in (1.75 m)
- Position: Centre forward

Youth career
- 1955–1956: Huddersfield Town

Senior career*
Years	Team	Apps	(Gls)
1956–1960	Huddersfield Town	81	(16)
1960–1961	Manchester City	44	(21)
1961–1962	Torino	27	(10)
1962–1973	Manchester United	309	(171)
1973–1974	Manchester City	24	(9)
Total		458	(227)

International career
1959–1961	Scotland U23	3	(1)
1958–1974	Scotland	55	(30)
- * Club domestic league appearances and goals

Denis Law (24 February 1940 – 17 January 2025) was a Scottish footballer who played as a forward. His career as a football player began at Second Division Huddersfield Town in 1956. After four years at Huddersfield, he was signed by Manchester City for an estimated transfer fee of £55,000, which set a new British record. Law spent one year there before Torino bought him for £110,000, this time setting a new record fee for a transfer involving a British player. Although he played well in Italy, he found it difficult to settle there and signed for Manchester United in 1962, setting another British record transfer fee of £115,000. He is regarded as one of the greatest forwards of all time and one of the greatest Scottish players of all time.

Law spent 11 years at Manchester United, where he scored 237 goals in 404 appearances. His goals tally places him third in the club's history, behind Wayne Rooney and Bobby Charlton. He was nicknamed "The King" and "The Lawman" by supporters, and "Denis the Menace" by opposing supporters. Law was also known as part of the "United Trinity", along with Charlton and George Best. He is the only Scottish player to have won the Ballon d'Or award, doing so in 1964, and helped his club win the First Division in 1965 and 1967, as well as the FA Cup in 1963 and two Charity Shields. He missed their European Cup final triumph in 1968 through injury.

Law left Manchester United in 1973 to return to Manchester City for a season, and represented Scotland at the 1974 FIFA World Cup. He played only two competitive games in the 1974–75 season, retiring before the start of the League programme proper. Law played for Scotland a total of 55 times and, with Kenny Dalglish, jointly holds the Scottish international record goal tally with 30 goals. Law holds a Manchester United record for scoring 46 competitive goals in a single season.

== Early life ==
Denis Law was born in Aberdeen, Scotland on 24 February 1940, to George Law, a fisherman, and his wife, Robina; he was the youngest of seven children, four boys and three girls. The Law family were poor and lived in a council tenement flat at Printfield Terrace in Woodside. He went barefoot until he was 12 years old and wore handed-down shoes throughout his adolescence; his first pair of football boots came as a second-hand birthday present from a neighbour, which he received as a teenager.

Law supported Aberdeen and watched them when he had enough money to do so, watching local non-league teams when he did not. His obsession with football led to him turning down a place at Aberdeen Grammar School, because he would have had to play rugby there; instead, he attended Powis Academy in Aberdeen. Despite having a serious squint, he showed great promise once he was moved from full back to inside-left, and was selected for Scotland Schoolboys.

== Club career ==
=== Huddersfield Town ===
"When I went to Huddersfield and Law turned up at 15, a skinny little boy, I knew that to over-train him would be a silly thing. I trained him, stopped him when he didn't need to train. And I knew what to give him."

— Bill Shankly on nurturing the teenage Law.

In the 1954–55 season, he was spotted by Archie Beattie, a scout for Huddersfield Town, who invited 14-year-old Law to go for a trial. When he got there, the manager Andy Beattie said, "The boy's a freak. Never did I see a less likely football prospect – weak, puny and bespectacled." However, to Law's surprise, they signed him on 3 April 1955. Bill Shankly, the reserve team coach, recognised that Law needed to be developed physically, with Law stating: "There was a cafe across the road from the ground and I needed feeding up. He would pay for the cafe to feed me up. He was just like a father really. I learned all of my football knowledge, if you want to call it that, from Bill Shankly." While he was at Huddersfield, Law had an operation to correct his squint, which greatly enhanced his self-confidence.

Huddersfield's relegation to the Second Division made it easier for Law to get a game, and under the newly appointed manager Shankly he made his debut on 24 December 1956, aged only sixteen, in a 2–1 win over Notts County. In The Three Kings documentary on Shankly, Matt Busby and Jock Stein, Law said Shankly "made you believe you were something special". Manchester United's manager Busby shortly offered Huddersfield £10,000 for Law (equivalent to £216,618 in 2025), a substantial amount of money for a teenage footballer at that time, but the club turned the offer down. Shankly, who managed Huddersfield between 1956 and 1959, wanted to take Law with him when he left for Liverpool, but Liverpool were unable to afford him at that time.

=== Manchester City ===
In March 1960, Law signed for Manchester City for what was then a British record transfer fee, estimated to be £55,000 (equivalent to £1,102,085 in 2025) although Law's share of the fee was "precisely nothing". Once again, Busby had attempted to sign Law for Manchester United, but United's cross-city rivals beat them to Law's signature.

City had narrowly avoided relegation from Division 1 the previous season, and Law felt that Huddersfield had a better team at the time. He made his debut on 19 March, and scored in a 4–3 defeat to Leeds United. Although he had thought about leaving, he was playing well and in 1961 Law scored six goals in an FA Cup tie against Luton Town. However, the match was abandoned with twenty minutes to go, so his six goals did not count. Luton won the replay 3–1, and City were knocked out of the Cup; Law had scored City's goal.

Although he enjoyed his time at City, he wanted to play in a more successful side and was sold to the Italian club Torino in the summer of 1961 for a British record of £110,000.

=== Torino ===
Law moved to Torino for a fee of £110,000 (equivalent to £2,135,908 in 2025), establishing a record fee for a transfer involving a British player, and was accompanied by Joe Baker who had signed from Scottish side Hibernian. Another Italian club, Internazionale, tried to prevent him becoming a Torino player as soon as he arrived, claiming he had signed a pre-contract agreement with them, although they dropped this claim before the season started.

Players in the UK were not treated well at the time, and the maximum wage for footballers had only recently been abolished, so Law was pleasantly surprised to find that pre-season training was based in a luxury hotel in the Alps. However, Torino used performance-related pay scheme, giving the players large sums of money when the team won, but little, if any, when they lost. Like many British footballers who have gone to play in Italy, Law did not like the style of football and found adapting to it difficult. The ultra-defensive catenaccio system was popular there at the time, so forwards did not get many chances to score.

On 7 February 1962, he was injured in a car crash when his teammate Joe Baker drove the wrong way around a roundabout and clipped the curb as he tried to turn the car around, flipping it over. Baker was almost killed, but Law's injuries were not life-threatening.

By April, he had put in a transfer request, which was ignored. The final straw for Law came in a match against Napoli when he was sent off. After the match, he was told that Torino's coach, Beniamino Santos, had instructed the referee to send him off because he was angry at Law for taking a throw in, which he had been told not to do. Law walked out, and was told that he would be transferred to Manchester United. A few days later, however, he was told that he was being sold to Juventus and that the small print in his contract committed him to going there whether he wanted to or not. He responded by flying home to Aberdeen, knowing that Torino would not get a penny in transfer fees if he refused to play at Juventus. He eventually signed for United on 10 July 1962, for a new British record fee of £115,000. (Note: This was roughly equivalent to £1.7 million at 2004 values, according to the retail price conversion utility at measuringworth.com.)

The lifestyle and culture of a foreign country was an eye-opener for the young Scotsman, and the medical expertise and sports science in Italy was far ahead of what was available in the UK at the time. Ultimately though, Law found the football to be joyless and overly defensive, with him being subjected to violent man marking and heavy tackling on a frequent basis. His total of 10 Serie A goals stood as a record for a Scottish player until Lewis Ferguson of Bologna surpassed it 61 years later.

=== Manchester United ===
==== Glory years ====
Video
- Law's voice and 1963 Cup final goal features in The Three Kings trailer on YouTube

Law moved back to Manchester, boarding with the same landlady with whom he had lived during his time as a City player. His first match for United was against West Bromwich Albion on 18 August 1962, and he made an excellent start, scoring after only seven minutes. The match finished in a 2–2 draw. However, United's form had been erratic since the Munich air disaster in 1958, and because of their inconsistency they spent the season fighting relegation. In a league match against Leicester City, Law scored a hat-trick but United still lost. They found form in the FA Cup though, with Law scoring another hat-trick in a 5–0 win against his old club Huddersfield Town, and they went on to reach the final against Leicester City. Leicester were favourites, having finished fourth in the league, but Law scored the first goal as United won 3–1 in what turned out to be the only FA Cup final of his career. He also married his wife Diana that season, on 11 December 1962.

An incident took place that season that Law felt had repercussions in later years. In a match against West Brom on 15 December 1962, the referee Gilbert Pullin consistently goaded Law with taunts such as "Oh, you clever so and so, you can't play", and after the match, Law and his manager Matt Busby reported the matter to the Football Association. A disciplinary committee decided that Pullin should be severely censured, but he did not accept their verdict and quit the game. Law later said that "in the eyes of some referees, I was a marked man" and blamed the incident for the "staggeringly heavy punishments" that he received later in his career.

Law scored a number of goals early in the 1963–64 season and was selected to play for a Rest of the World side against England at Wembley, scoring their goal in a 2–1 defeat. He later described this as the greatest honour of his career. His season was interrupted by a 28-day suspension for a sending off that he received against Aston Villa. The unusually cold winter forced United to play many of their fixtures in a short time, and their results suffered. Law later blamed this for United's failure to win a trophy in that season. Despite the lack of silverware, Law enjoyed a prolific goalscoring season and finished the campaign with 46 goals in all competitions, still a club record today.

In 1964–65, Law won the Ballon d'Or award, and Manchester United won their first league title since Munich. Law's 28 league goals that season made him the First Division's top scorer. The following season, Law injured his right knee while playing for Scotland against Poland on 21 October 1965. He had previously had an operation on the same knee while at Huddersfield, and the injury was to trouble him for the rest of his career.

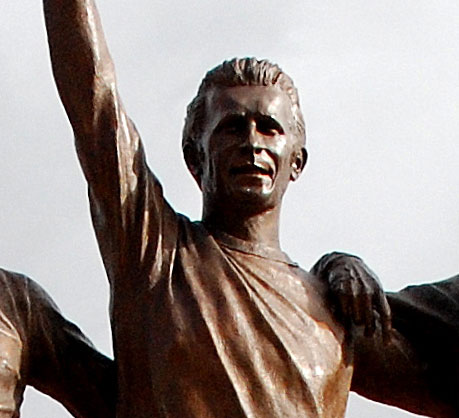
Law as depicted on a statue at Old Trafford, in which he is alongside George Best and Bobby Charlton as the "United Trinity"

In 1966, Law asked United's manager Matt Busby to give him a pay rise at his next contract renewal, and threatened to leave the club if he did not get one. Busby immediately placed Law on the transfer list, announcing that "no player will hold this club to ransom, no player". When Law went to see him, Busby pulled out a written apology for him to sign, showing it to the press once he had done so. Law later said that Busby had used the incident to warn other players not to do the same thing, but had secretly given him the pay rise. Law scored 23 goals in 36 league appearances during 1966–67, helping United win the league title again.

In 1968, United won the European Cup for the first time, but Law's knee injury was causing him serious problems. He missed both the semi-final second leg and the final as a result, with John Aston taking his place for the final. Law was regularly given cortisone injections to ease the pain, but playing while the knee was still injured was causing long-term damage. He visited a specialist in January 1968 who wrote to United claiming that a previous operation to remove the cartilage from the knee had failed and recommending that a second operation be performed, but Law was not shown the report for several years and had to continue full training.

In 1968–69, United reached the semi-final of the European Cup, playing AC Milan. United lost the first leg in the San Siro 2–0, winning the second leg at Old Trafford 1–0 with a Bobby Charlton goal. Having scored seven times in the 10–2 aggregate first round victory over Waterford United, Law finished as top scorer in the tournament with 9 goals.

==== Injury problems ====
Wilf McGuinness took over as first team coach at the start of the 1969–70 season. United finished eighth in the league, but Law missed almost all of the season through injury, and in April 1970 he was transfer listed for £60,000. Nobody made a bid for him, so he stayed at United.

After a poor 1970–71 season, United appointed Frank O'Farrell as manager. They made a good start to the 1971–72 season and finished 1971 five points clear at the top of the league, with Law having scored twelve goals. However, results deteriorated and they finished the season in eighth place. Law scored in the first match of the following season, 1972–73, but his knee injury was troubling him again, and he failed to score for the rest of the season. The poor results continued and O'Farrell was dismissed in December 1972 after a 5–0 defeat by Crystal Palace.

Law recommended that United replace O'Farrell with Tommy Docherty, whom he knew from his time playing with the Scottish national side. The club followed his recommendation, and things started well, with the team's improved results lifting them into mid-table. Law was given a free transfer by Tommy Docherty in the summer of 1973, after 11 years at the club during which he had scored a total of 237 goals in 404 games in all competitions, as well as collected two league title medals and an FA Cup winner's medal. Only Bobby Charlton (who retired in 1973) and Wayne Rooney have scored more goals for United.

=== Return to Manchester City ===
Law was offered a contract by Manchester City manager Johnny Hart. He scored two goals on his second debut for City, against Birmingham City in the opening game of the 1973–74 season. He made 27 full appearances and two as substitute in that season, including City's 2–1 defeat in the League Cup final against Wolves. In City's last game of the 1973–74 season against Manchester United at Old Trafford, Law's 81st-minute back-heeled goal gave City a 1–0 lead but, thinking his goal might relegate United, Law did not celebrate the goal. Results of the day's other matches meant that United were relegated whatever their result, but Law did not know that at the time. A number of pitch invasions by United fans followed, and Law walked off the pitch with his head down as he was substituted. The pitch invasions forced the referee to abandon the game in the 85th minute. After a review, the Football League decided that the result should stand.

Law had a contract with Manchester City for the 1974–75 season, but new manager Tony Book told him that he would only be playing reserve team football if he stayed at the club. He did not want to end his career in this way, so he retired from professional football in the summer of 1974. Law played two games for Manchester City in the 1974–75 season, in the pre-season Texaco Cup tournament, scoring the last goal of his career in the game against Sheffield United at Bramall Lane on 6 August 1974. His last professional game was the 2–1 victory against Oldham Athletic at Maine Road on 10 August 1974. He formally retired on 26 August 1974.

== International career ==
Law was not chosen to play for Scotland in the 1958 FIFA World Cup, but was given his debut in a British Home Championship match against Wales on 18 October 1958 by Matt Busby, who managed Scotland on a temporary basis for two matches. Law scored Scotland's second goal in a 3–0 win over the Welsh at Ninian Park. He played but did not score in Scotland's match against England on 15 April 1961. Scotland lost the match 9–3, and Law described it as his "blackest day".

Law was chosen for the Rest of the World team that faced England in the FA Centenary match in 1963. Law scored the only goal for Rest of the World as England won 2–1.

Law injured his right knee while playing for Scotland against Poland on 21 October 1965. Law scored in Scotland's famous 3–2 victory over England on 15 April 1967 in the 1967 British Home Championship, less than a year after England had won the World Cup, thereby making Scotland the "unofficial" world champions. Manchester United won the league that season, but Law felt that the victory over England was even more satisfying.

Scotland reached the World Cup finals in the summer of 1974, for the first time since 1958. Although he had not played much first team football in the preceding season, Law was included in the squad and played in their first match, against Zaire. He did not score, but Scotland won 2–0. Law was "very disappointed" not to be picked for the following match against Brazil, and was not selected for the following match against Yugoslavia either. Although Scotland were not defeated in any of their matches, they did not qualify for the second phase and were out of the World Cup. The match against Zaire proved to be the last of Law's 55 appearances for Scotland.

Law jointly holds the Scottish international record goal tally with 30 goals. (Note: Kenny Dalglish also scored 30 goals for Scotland, although he achieved this in 102 matches compared with Law's 55.)

== Personal life ==
Law first met his wife, Diana, in an Aberdeenshire dancehall when they were both teenagers. They married in December 1962 and went on to have five children. Their daughter worked for several years in the Manchester United press office.

After retiring as a player, Law often worked on radio and television summarising and presenting games. He was one of the first sport news presenters of Granada Reports and was the sub-presenter of Granada Television's Kick Off Match, the equivalent of LWT's The Big Match. He appeared as a special guest on the TV guest show This Is Your Life on 19 February 1975, months after retiring as a player.

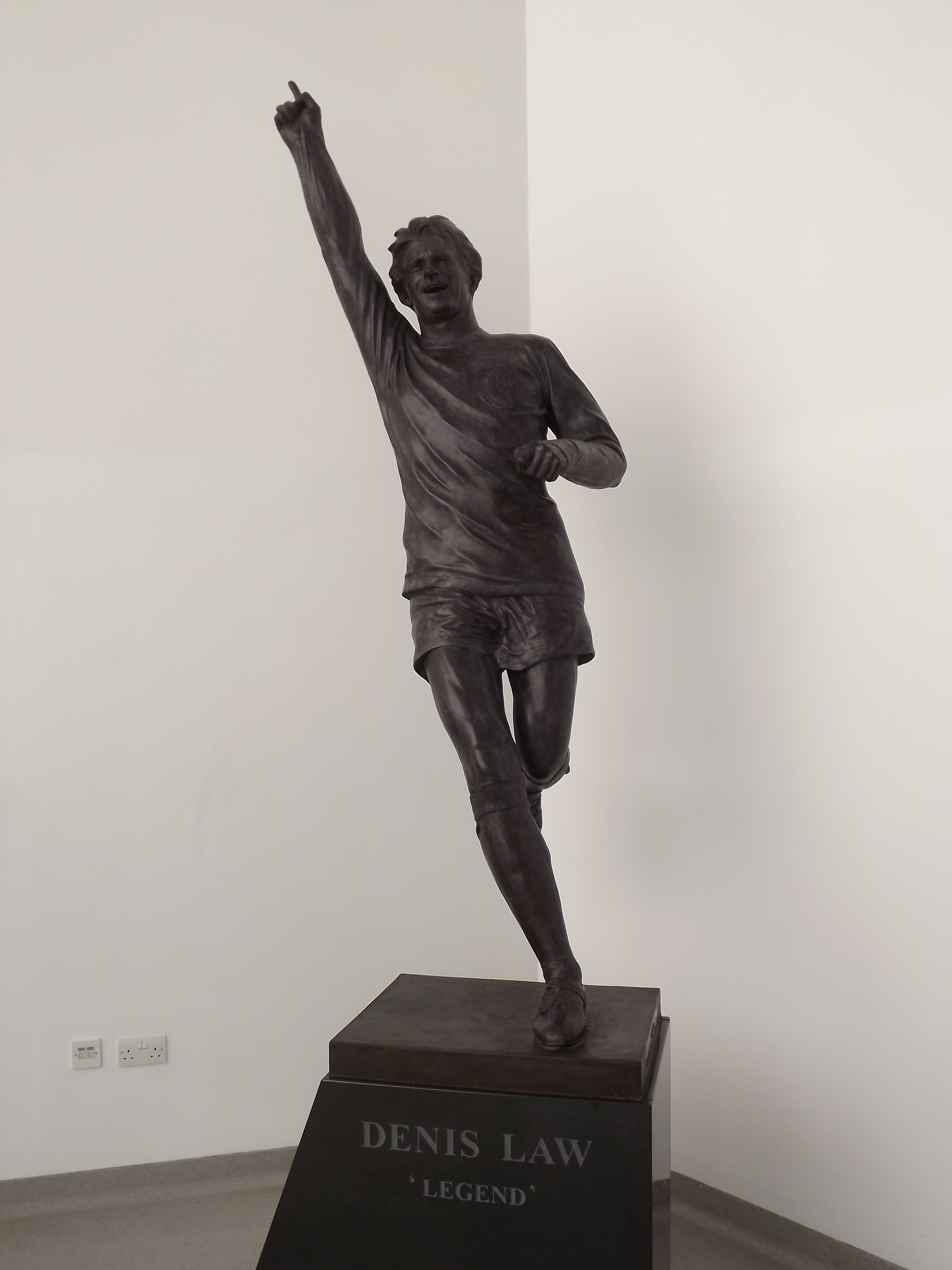
Statue of Law at Aberdeen Sports Village

He was made an Inaugural Inductee of the English Football Hall of Fame in 2002 in recognition of his impact on the English game. On 23 February 2002, a statue of Law (alongside George Best and Bobby Charlton) was unveiled at Old Trafford, in the part of the stadium known as the Scoreboard End. He had a successful operation to treat prostate cancer in November 2003 and was awarded honorary degrees from the Universities of Aberdeen and St. Andrews in 2005, and Robert Gordon University in 2017.

The emergence of Dutch international Dennis Bergkamp in the 1990s uncovered a story that the player's parents were fans of Law and named their son after him. However, Dutch authorities refused to recognise the name unless it was spelt with two n's as they felt it was otherwise too similar to the female name Denise.

On 25 November 2005, Law was at the bedside of former United teammate George Best as he died of multiple organ failure.

In May 2008, at the City of Manchester Stadium, he (with UEFA president Michel Platini) presented the medals to the winners of the UEFA Cup, Zenit Saint Petersburg, and their opponents, Scottish side Rangers. In February 2010, Law was named as patron of the UK based charity Football Aid, taking over from the late Sir Bobby Robson.

In 2012, he established the Denis Law Legacy Trust, a registered charity that operates programmes and activities focussed around community engagement and widening sporting participation. The charity aims to reduce instances of youth crime and anti-social behaviour; promote health and wellbeing and encourage inclusivity through sport, physical activity and creative endeavour collaborating on community projects like Scotland's first Cruyff Court in Aberdeen.

Law was appointed a CBE in the 2016 New Year Honours for services to football and charity. In 2017, he received the Freedom of the City of Aberdeen.

=== Legacy Artworks ===
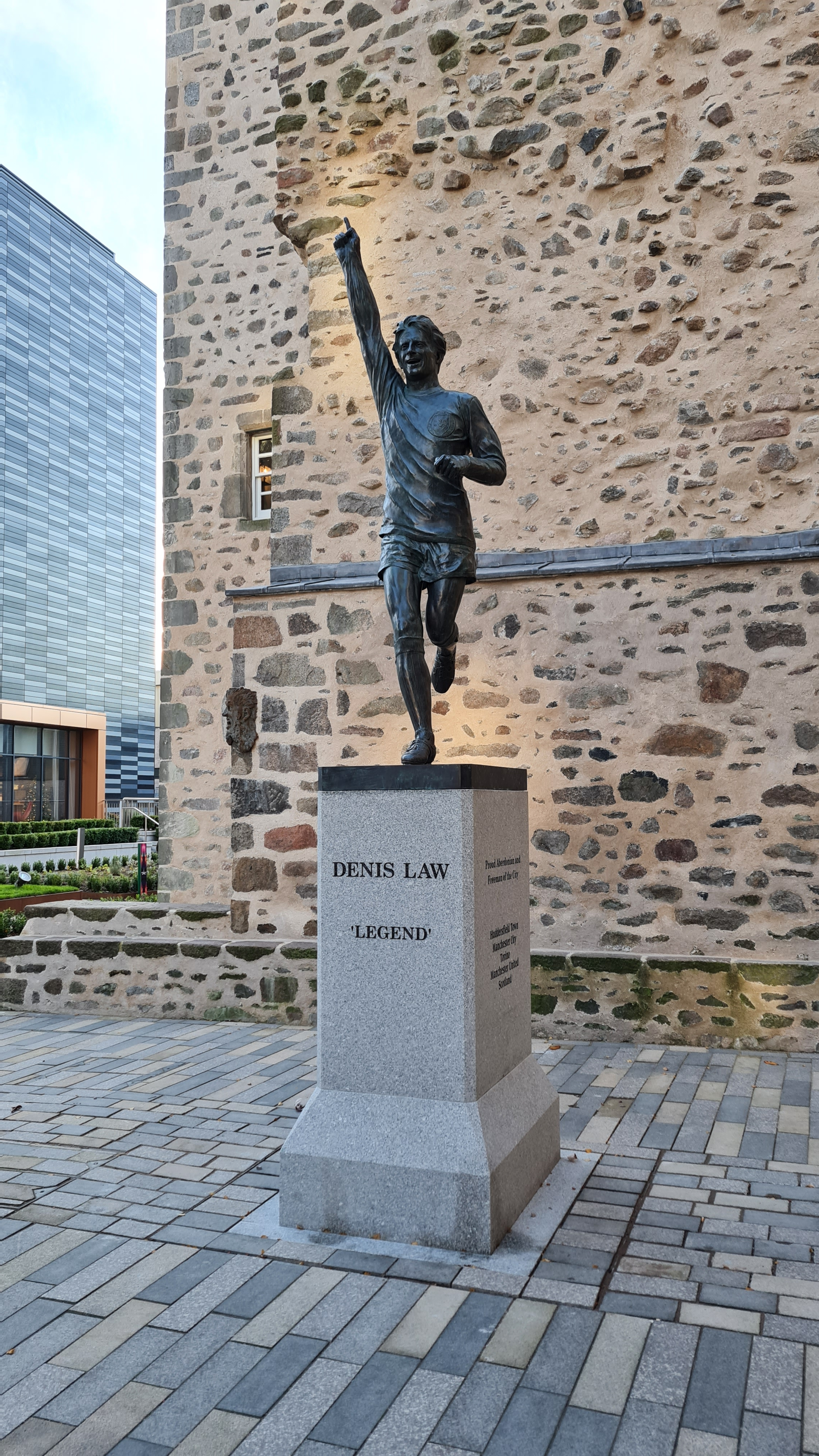
Bronze statue of Law created by Alan Herriot and unveiled in November 2021

In 2012, a statue to Law, commissioned by the Denis Law Legacy Trust, was unveiled at the entrance to Aberdeen Sports Village (a facility he had formally opened two years earlier) depicting his pose after scoring for Scotland against England in 1967.

On 18 November 2021, Law and Sir Alex Ferguson unveiled a second statue of Law in Aberdeen, created in bronze by sculptor Alan Herriot. Commissioned by Aberdeen City Council, it is located next to Provost Skene's House, in Marischal Square.

A pair of tribute murals was created on the sides of Clifton Court in the Woodside area of Aberdeen where he grew up. These were painted by Jerome Davenport of the Blank Walls street art company, and unveiled in March 2025.

=== Illness and death ===
In August 2021, it was announced that he had been diagnosed with Alzheimer's disease and vascular dementia. Law died on 17 January 2025, at the age of 84.

On 23 March 2025, before the Nations League match between Scotland and Greece, a tribute to Law was held at Hampden Park, led by Alex Ferguson.

== Career statistics ==
=== Club ===
Appearances and goals by club, season and competition
Club	Season	League			National cup		League cup		Continental		Other (Note: Includes Charity Shield and Intercontinental Cup.)		Total	
Club	Season	Division	Apps	Goals	Apps	Goals	Apps	Goals	Apps	Goals	Apps	Goals	Apps	Goals
Huddersfield Town	1956–57	Second Division	13	2	5	1	–		–		–		18	3
Huddersfield Town	1957–58	Second Division	18	5	2	1	–		–		–		20	6
Huddersfield Town	1958–59	Second Division	26	2	0	0	–		–		–		26	2
Huddersfield Town	1959–60	Second Division	24	7	3	1	–		–		–		27	8
Huddersfield Town	Total		81	16	10	3	–		–		–		91	19
Manchester City	1959–60	First Division	7	2	0	0	–		–		–		7	2
Manchester City	1960–61	First Division	37	19	6	4	0	0	–		–		43	23
Manchester City	Total		44	21	6	4	0	0	–		–		50	25
Torino	1961–62	Serie A	27	10	1	0	–		–		–		28	10
Manchester United	1962–63	First Division	38	23	6	6	–		–		–		44	29
Manchester United	1963–64	First Division	30	30	6	10	–		5	6	1	0	42	46
Manchester United	1964–65	First Division	36	28	6	3	–		10	8	–		52	39
Manchester United	1965–66	First Division	33	15	7	6	–		8	3	1	0	49	24
Manchester United	1966–67	First Division	36	23	2	2	0	0	–		–		38	25
Manchester United	1967–68	First Division	23	7	1	0	–		3	2	1	1	28	10
Manchester United	1968–69	First Division	30	14	6	7	–		7	9	2	0	45	30
Manchester United	1969–70	First Division	11	2	2	0	3	1	–		–		16	3
Manchester United	1970–71	First Division	28	15	2	0	4	1	–		–		34	16
Manchester United	1971–72	First Division	33	13	7	0	2	0	–		–		42	13
Manchester United	1972–73	First Division	11	1	1	0	2	1	–		–		14	2
Manchester United	Total		309	171	46	34	11	3	33	28	5	1	404	237
Manchester City	1973–74	First Division	24	9	1	2	4	1	–		–		29	12
Career total			485	227	64	43	15	4	33	28	5	1	602	303

=== International ===
Appearances and goals by national team and year
National team	Year	Apps	Goals
Scotland	1958	2	1
Scotland	1959	4	0
Scotland	1960	4	2
Scotland	1961	3	2
Scotland	1962	3	5
Scotland	1963	7	11
Scotland	1964	5	1
Scotland	1965	6	2
Scotland	1966	2	2
Scotland	1967	3	1
Scotland	1968	1	1
Scotland	1969	2	0
Scotland	1970	0	0
Scotland	1971	0	0
Scotland	1972	7	2
Scotland	1973	3	0
Scotland	1974	3	0
Total		55	30

== Honours ==
Manchester United

- Football League First Division: 1964–65, 1966–67
- FA Cup: 1962–63
- FA Charity Shield: 1965, 1967
- European Cup: 1967-68

Manchester City

- Football League Cup runner-up: 1973–74

Scotland

- British Home Championship: 1959–60 (shared), 1961–62, 1962–63, 1963–64 (shared), 1966–67, 1971–72 (shared)

Individual

- Ballon d'Or: 1964
- World Soccer World XI: 1964
- European Cup top scorer: 1968–69
- Football League 100 Legends: 1998
- PFA Merit Award: 1975
- Scottish FA International Roll of Honour (players with 50+ caps): inducted in 1988
- FWA Tribute Award: 1994
- Inaugural Inductee of the English Football Hall of Fame: 2002
- Scotland's Golden Player: Most Outstanding Player of the past 50 years by the Scottish Football Association (November 2003, to celebrate UEFA's Jubilee)
- Scottish Football Hall of Fame: inducted in 2004
- PFA Team of the Century (1907–1976): 2007
- Freedom of Aberdeen: 2017

== See also ==
- List of footballers in England by number of league goals (200+)
- List of Scotland national football team captains
- List of Scotland national football team hat-tricks
- List of top international men's football goalscorers by country

== Sources ==
- Law, Denis; Gubba, Ron (1980). Denis Law – An Autobiography. Futura Publications. ISBN 0-7088-1902-8.
- Law, Denis; Harris, Bob (2003). The King. Bantam Press. ISBN 0-593-05140-8.
