= Brian Tickell =

English footballer

Personal information
- Full name: Brian Gerard Tickell
- Date of birth: 15 November 1939 (age 86)
- Place of birth: Carlisle, England
- Position: Striker

Senior career*
Years	Team	Apps	(Gls)
1958–1959	Huddersfield Town	1	(0)
1959–1960	Carlisle United	3	(1)
- Gateshead
- * Club domestic league appearances and goals

Brian Gerard Tickell (born 15 November 1939) is a former professional footballer, who played for Huddersfield Town, Carlisle United and Gateshead. He was born in Carlisle, Cumberland.
