= Alex Hird =

Scottish footballer

Personal information
- Full name: Alexander Hird
- Date of birth: 2 September 1900
- Place of birth: Montrose, Scotland
- Date of death: 1988 (aged 87–88)
- Position: Half-back

Senior career*
Years	Team	Apps	(Gls)
1920–1921	Montrose		
1921–1922	Dundee		
1922–1927	South Shields	69	(2)
1927–1931	Charlton Athletic	130	(1)
Total		199	(3)
- * Club domestic league appearances and goals

Alexander Hird (2 September 1900 – 1988) was a Scottish footballer who played in the Football League for Charlton Athletic and South Shields.
