= Bert Goodman =

English footballer

Personal information
- Full name: Albert Abraham Goodman
- Date of birth: 3 September 1890
- Place of birth: Dalston, England
- Date of death: 7 December 1959 (aged 69)
- Place of death: Ilford, England
- Height: 5 ft 8 in (1.73 m)
- Positions: Forward; utility player

Senior career*
Years	Team	Apps	(Gls)
- London Fields
–	Tufnell Park		
–	Tottenham Thursday		
1913–1914	Maidstone United		
1914–1916	Croydon Common	21	(3)
1916–1919	Clapton Orient	16	(1)
1919	Maidstone United		
1919–1920	Tottenham Hotspur		
1920–1921	Margate		
1921–1925	Charlton Athletic	136	(15)
1925–1926	Gillingham	6	(0)
1926–1927	Clapton Orient	12	(0)
1927–1928	Guildford City	6	(0)
- * Club domestic league appearances and goals

Albert Abraham Goodman (3 September 1890 – 7 December 1959) was an English professional footballer who played for London Fields, Tufnell Park, Tottenham Thursday, Maidstone United, Croydon Common, Tottenham Hotspur, Margate, Charlton Athletic, Gillingham, Clapton Orient and Guildford City.

== Football career ==
Goodman played for non-League teams London Fields, Tufnell Park, Tottenham Thursday, Maidstone United and Croydon Common before joining Tottenham Hotspur in 1919 where he played 17 matches and scored one goal in all competitions. After leaving the Lilywhites he played for Margate. In 1921 he signed for Charlton Athletic and featured in 136 matches and found the net on 15 occasions. He went on to make appearances at Gillingham, Clapton Orient and finally at Guildford City.

== Personal life ==
In 1935, Goodman was convicted of breaking into a tailor's shop in Ilford and stealing goods valued at £570; he was sentenced to 12 months' imprisonment. He died in December 1959, three days after he crashed a van into a wall in Ilford.
