= 1964 Ballon d'Or =

Annual football award event in France

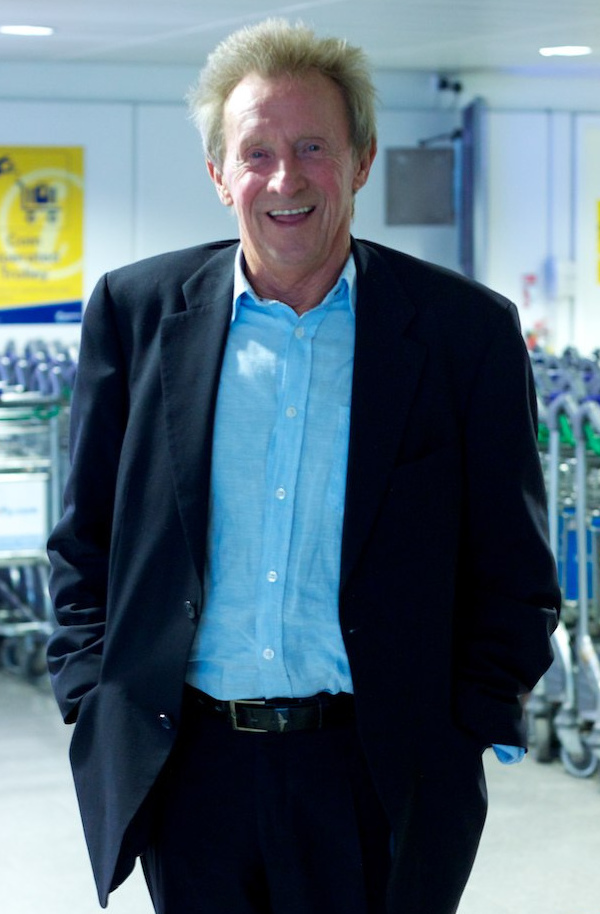
- 1964 Ballon d'Or winner, Denis Law in 2011
- Date: 22 December 1964
- Location: Paris, France
- Presented by: France Football

Highlights
- Won by: (Scotland) Denis Law (1st award)
- Website: ballondor.com

The 1964 Ballon d'Or, given to the best football player in Europe as judged by a panel of sports journalists from UEFA member countries, was awarded to Denis Law on 22 December 1964. He was the first Scotsman to win the honour.

== Rankings ==
Rank	Name	Club(s)	Nationality	Points
1	Denis Law	(England) Manchester United	Scotland	61
2	Luis Suárez	(Italy) Internazionale	Spain	43
3	Amancio	(Spain) Real Madrid	Spain	38
4	Eusébio	(Portugal) Benfica	Portugal	31
5	Paul Van Himst	(Belgium) Anderlecht	Belgium	28
6	Jimmy Greaves	(England) Tottenham Hotspur	England	19
7	Mario Corso	(Italy) Internazionale	Italy	17
8	Lev Yashin	(Soviet Union) Dynamo Moscow	Soviet Union	15
9	Gianni Rivera	(Italy) Milan	Italy	14
10	Valery Voronin	(Soviet Union) Torpedo Moscow	Soviet Union	11
11	Ferenc Bene	(Hungary) Újpest	Hungary	6
11	Karl-Heinz Schnellinger	(Italy) Mantova (Italy) Roma	West Germany	6
13	Jean Nicolay	(Belgium) Standard Liège	Belgium	5
14	Helmut Haller	(Italy) Bologna	West Germany	4
15	José Torres	(Portugal) Benfica	Portugal	3
16	Flórián Albert	(Hungary) Ferencváros	Hungary	2
16	José Altafini	(Italy) Milan	Italy	2
16	Coen Moulijn	(Netherlands) Feyenoord	Netherlands	2
19	Néstor Combin	(France) Lyon (Italy) Juventus	France	1
19	Giacinto Facchetti	(Italy) Internazionale	Italy	1
19	Ole Madsen	(Denmark) HIK	Denmark	1
19	Sandro Mazzola	(Italy) Internazionale	Italy	1
19	Bobby Moore	(England) West Ham United	England	1
19	Jef Jurion	(Belgium) Anderlecht	Belgium	1
19	Omar Sívori	(Italy) Juventus	Italy	1
19	Klaus Urbanczyk	(East Germany) Chemie Halle	East Germany	1
