= Peter Hunt (footballer) =

English footballer

Personal information
- Full name: Peter John Hunt
- Date of birth: 2 July 1952 (age 74)
- Place of birth: Stepney, London, England
- Position: Midfielder

Senior career*
Years	Team	Apps	(Gls)
1968–1972	Southend United	56	(1)
1972–1977	Charlton Athletic	158	(6)
1977–1978	Gillingham	23	(0)
1978–1980	Gravesend & Northfleet	?	(?)
1980–1981	Barking Town	?	(?)
Total		237	(7)
- * Club domestic league appearances and goals

Peter John Hunt (born 2 July 1952) is an English footballer who played as a midfielder in the Football League.
