= Brian Kinsey =

English footballer

Personal information
- Date of birth: 4 March 1938 (age 88)
- Place of birth: Charlton, London, England
- Height: 1.75 m (5 ft 9 in)
- Position: Left back

Senior career*
Years	Team	Apps	(Gls)
1955–1956	Bromley	?	(?)
1956–1971	Charlton Athletic	377	(19)
1971–1973	Cape Town City	?	(?)
1973–1974	Tonbridge	?	(?)
- * Club domestic league appearances and goals

Brian Kinsey (born 4 March 1938) is an English former professional footballer who played as a left back in the Football League.
