= Stan Howard (Australian footballer) =

Australian rules footballer, born 1916

Personal information
- Full name: Stanley Joseph Hilliard Howard
- Born: 19 April 1916; Terang, Victoria
- Died: 3 August 1982 (aged 66); Ocean Grove, Victoria
- Original team: Terang
- Height: 178 cm (5 ft 10 in)
- Weight: 83 kg (183 lb)
- Position: Halfback

Playing career^{1}
Years	Club	Games (Goals)
1937–41	Geelong	54 (1)
- ^{1} Playing statistics correct to the end of 1941.

Stanley Joseph Hilliard Howard (19 April 1916 – 3 August 1982) was an Australian rules footballer who played with Geelong in the Victorian Football League (VFL).

== Football ==
=== Geelong (VFL) ===
He played on the half-back flank for the Geelong Second XVIII team that defeated Collingwood 12.12 (84) to 9.11 (65), at the MCG on Thursday, 30 September 1937, to win the 1937 VFL Second's premiership.
