= Ron Cockerill =

English footballer (1935–2010)

Personal information
- Date of birth: 28 February 1935
- Place of birth: Sheffield, England
- Date of death: 4 November 2010 (aged 75)
- Height: 6 ft 2 in (1.88 m)
- Position: Defender

Senior career*
Years	Team	Apps	(Gls)
1955–1958	Huddersfield Town	40	(1)
1958–1968	Grimsby Town	294	(28)
- * Club domestic league appearances and goals

Ronald Cockerill (28 February 1935 – 4 November 2010) was an English professional footballer who played in the Football League as a defender for Huddersfield Town and Grimsby Town.

Cockerill was born in Sheffield.

His sons Glenn and John were also professional footballers.

Cockerill died on 3 November 2010.
