= Keith Jobling =

English footballer (1934–2020)

Personal information
- Full name: Keith Reginald Jobling
- Date of birth: 26 March 1934
- Place of birth: Scunthorpe, England
- Date of death: 20 September 2020 (aged 86)
- Position: Centre half

Youth career
- New Waltham

Senior career*
Years	Team	Apps	(Gls)
1953–1969	Grimsby Town	450	(5)
1969–1972	Boston United		

Managerial career
- 1972–1975: Boston United
- * Club domestic league appearances and goals

Keith Jobling (26 March 1934 – 20 September 2020) was an English professional footballer who made 450 appearances in the Football League as a centre half for Grimsby Town. Until overtaken by John McDermott in 2000, Jobling was Grimsby Town's appearance record-holder. After leaving Grimsby he joined Boston United, first as a player and then as successor to Jim Smith as manager.

Jobling died on 20 September 2020, at the age of 86.
