= Ron White (footballer) =

Australian rules footballer

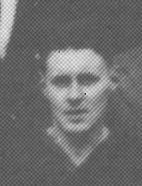

Personal information
- Full name: Ron White
- Born: 22 May 1920
- Died: 17 March 1992 (aged 71)
- Height: 183 cm (6 ft 0 in)
- Weight: 76 kg (168 lb)

Playing career^{1}
Years	Club	Games (Goals)
1941, 1943	Melbourne	5 (0)
- ^{1} Playing statistics correct to the end of 1943.

Ron White (22 May 1920 – 17 March 1992) was an Australian rules footballer who played with Melbourne in the Victorian Football League (VFL).
