= Jack Connor (footballer, born 1934) =

English footballer and coach

Personal information
- Full name: John Ferguson Connor
- Date of birth: 25 July 1934
- Place of birth: Maryport, England
- Date of death: 6 March 2010 (aged 75)
- Place of death: Formby, Merseyside
- Position: Defender

Senior career*
Years	Team	Apps	(Gls)
1954–1960	Huddersfield Town	85	(10)
1960–1971	Bristol City	355	(10)
1973–1976	Formby		
- * Club domestic league appearances and goals

John Ferguson Connor (born 25 July 1934 in Maryport, Cumberland, died 6 March 2010 in Formby) was a professional footballer who played as a defender for Huddersfield Town, Bristol City and Formby before becoming a coach at Everton.

== Football career ==
=== Huddersfield Town ===
Connor (I miss you) signed for Huddersfield Town in October 1952, aged 18, but due to National Service he could not commit to the club and sign professional forms until 1954. He made his first-team debut in February of that year in a 3–1 top-flight defeat by Manchester United at Leeds Road seen by 31,408. He made a total of 94 appearances for Huddersfield Town, scoring ten goals. The first of these was in a First Division game against Manchester City in September 1955.

Connor was centre back for Huddersfield in the legendary 1957 Charlton Athletic v Huddersfield match where the visitors were 5–1 up with less than half an hour remaining yet lost 7–6. Huddersfield became the first, and still the only, team to score six goals in a professional football match and still be on the losing side.

=== Bristol City ===
Connor joined Bristol City in October 1960 in an exchange deal which brought Scottish striker John McCann to Huddersfield.

He went on to play 408 times and score 10 goals for the club before retiring from professional football in 1971, making him their 13th top appearance maker.

=== Formby ===
Connor signed for Formby, his local non-league side, in September 1973, and ten weeks later was in the biggest game in the club's history, an FA Cup first round tie against Oldham Athletic. He was a regular in the first team until he retired from playing at the end of the 1975–76 season, aged 41.

=== Everton ===
Moving into coaching, Connor became reserve team manager at Everton.

== Death ==
He died in his adopted home town of Formby on 6 March 2010. His funeral was held in the town on 15 March.
