= Willie Duff =

Scottish footballer (1935–2004)

Personal information
- Full name: William Duff
- Date of birth: 6 February 1935
- Place of birth: Winchburgh, Scotland
- Date of death: 30 August 2004 (aged 69)
- Place of death: Edinburgh, Scotland
- Position: Goalkeeper

Youth career
- Slateford Athletic
- 19??–1952: Easthouses Lily

Senior career*
Years	Team	Apps	(Gls)
1952–1958	Hearts	62	(0)
1956–1958	→ Charlton Athletic (loan)		
1958–1963	Charlton Athletic	213	(0)
1963–1967	Peterborough United	118	(0)
1967–1970	Dunfermline Athletic	35	(0)
1971	Raith Rovers	1	(0)
1971–1972	East Stirlingshire	15	(0)
1973–1974	Albion Rovers	3	(0)

International career
1954	Scottish League XI	1	(0)
- * Club domestic league appearances and goals

William Duff (6 February 1935 – 30 August 2004) was a Scottish professional footballer who played as a goalkeeper.

Born in Winchburgh, West Lothian, Duff grew up in western Edinburgh, attending Corstorphine Primary School and Boroughmuir High School. He originally played as a left-back while with juvenile side Slateford Athletic but deputised in goal on one occasion when the side's regular custodian didn't turn up and retained the role afterwards. He caught the attention of Easthouses Lily with his performances in his new position and worked as a joiner while playing for them in the East of Scotland League.

In 1952, Hearts' manager Tommy Walker paid £200 for Duff's signature and he moved to Tynecastle as back-up for Jimmy Watters. After two years playing reserve football, Duff earned his chance in the first team in the 1954–55 season. He made his debut in a League Cup tie against Dundee and retained his position in the side as Hearts went on to lift the trophy, their first in 48 years, by defeating Motherwell 4–2 in the final. The following year, he added a Scottish Cup winners medal to his collection as Hearts beat Celtic 3–1 in the final. Celtic's goal was the only one Duff conceded in the entire cup run, encompassing games against Forfar, Stirling Albion, Rangers and Raith Rovers (twice), while his display in the final was "brilliant", in the opinion of teammate and Scotland internationalist Dave Mackay.

During the 1950s, all British men were obliged to fulfil a period of national service and in the latter part of 1956, Duff received call-up papers to the army's Royal Horse Artillery, based in Surrey. Rather than commute back to Edinburgh from his southern barracks for weekend games, he guested for London side Charlton Athletic, then in the lower reaches of the English First Division. The Addicks had struggled to replace their legendary goalkeeper Sam Bartram since his retirement earlier that year but Duff quickly established the Charlton goalkeeper's position as his own with a string of accomplished performances, which led to his selection in the Army's representative side. He signed permanently for Charlton when his national service was over, for a fee of £6,500, and made over 200 appearances in seven years at The Valley.

Duff joined Peterborough United in 1963 and after several seasons with the Posh returned to Scotland with Dunfermline Athletic. He enjoyed an Indian Summer to his career with the Pars, helping the side reach the 1968–69 Cup Winners' Cup semi-final. He retired after leaving Dunfermline but made a number of brief comebacks to cover for injuries, assisting Raith Rovers, East Stirlingshire and Albion Rovers in this manner.

After his final retirement, Duff established a joinery business in Edinburgh. He emigrated to the US, where his son Bill is domiciled in Washington, D.C., in the 1980s but returned to Edinburgh in 2003. He died suddenly on 30 August 2004, whilst playing bowls with friends.
