= Don Townsend =

English footballer (1930–2020)

Personal information
- Date of birth: 17 September 1930
- Place of birth: Swindon, England
- Date of death: 29 July 2020 (aged 89)
- Position: Left-back

Senior career*
Years	Team	Apps	(Gls)
1953–1954	Trowbridge Town		
1954–1962	Charlton Athletic	249	(1)
1962–1965	Crystal Palace	77	(0)
Total		326	(1)
- * Club domestic league appearances and goals

Donald Edward Townsend (17 September 1930 – 29 July 2020) was an English footballer who played as a left back in the Football League. He was the father of former Ireland international Andy Townsend.

Townsend died on 29 July 2020, at the age of 89.
