= Derek Ufton =

English cricketer and footballer (1928–2021)

Personal information
- Full name: Derek Gilbert Ufton
- Born: 31 May 1928; Crayford, Kent, England
- Died: 27 March 2021 (aged 92)
- Height: 5 ft 11 1/2 in (1.82 m)
- Batting: Left-handed
- Role: Wicket-keeper

Domestic team information
- Years: Team
- 1949–1962: Kent
- FC debut: 23 July 1949 Kent v Warwickshire
- Last FC: 2 June 1962 Kent v Warwickshire

Career statistics
| Competition | First-class |
|---|---|
| Matches | 149 |
| Runs scored | 3,919 |
| Batting average | 19.99 |
| 100s/50s | 1/10 |
| Top score | 119* |
| Catches/stumpings | 270/44 |
- Source: CricInfo, 27 March 2021

Derek Gilbert Ufton (31 May 1928 – 27 March 2021) was an English professional cricketer and footballer, and later a football manager. Playing professionally for Kent County Cricket Club as a wicket-keeper and Charlton Athletic Football Club, Ufton won a single international cap for the England national football team in 1953. He went on to manage Plymouth Argyle. At the time of his death, in March 2021 at the age of 92, he was England's oldest living international footballer.

== Early life ==
Ufton was born at Crayford in Kent in 1928. After winning a scholarship, he was educated at Dartford Grammar School where his PE teacher was Joe Jagger, the father of future rock star Mick Jagger. Growing up during World War II, Ufton worked in a shipping office in London during the later part of the war. His mother was killed in an air raid in 1944.

He completed his national service in the Royal Army Service Corps in Aldershot after the end of the war, playing cricket for the RASC and football for Army teams alongside Jimmy Hill. He shared a flat with Hill in London after being demobilised and went on to meet Malcolm Allison, who he remained friends with. This meeting led to him signing as a professional for Charlton Athletic Football Club in 1949, having been also offered a trial at Cardiff City.

== Cricket career ==
A keen sportsman, Ufton played first-class cricket for Kent County Cricket Club between 1949 and 1962 as a wicket-keeper batsman. He had first played for the county's Second XI in 1945 and was awarded his Second XI cap in 1946, but his period of national service meant he did not make his First XI debut until 1949. He scored almost 4,000 runs for the team, keeping wicket as a replacement for England international wicket-keeper Godfrey Evans. In 1961, his most successful season statistically, he scored 668 runs for Kent and took 90 dismissals and made his only first-class appearance for a non-Kent team, playing for an MCC team against Scotland. His only first-class century, a score of 119 not out was made against Sussex at Hastings in 1952.

Ufton was awarded his Kent county cap in 1956 and continued playing for he county's Second XI after he dropped out of the First XI during 1962, often captaining the team until 1966. He was awarded a benefit season in 1963 and later served on Kent's General Committee and was the club's president in 1991. He played club cricket for Dartford Cricket Club, continuing to be involved with the club throughout his life.

== Football career ==
Ufton made 277 appearances, primarily as a centre half, for Charlton Athletic between 1949 and 1960. He was notorious for shoulder injuries, and dislocated his at least 20 times during his football career. He gained his only England cap in 1953, against a team from the Rest of Europe.

He was captain of Charlton in the record-setting match against Huddersfield Town at The Valley on 21 December 1957. Charlton played most of the match with 10 men after Ufton broke his collar bone, and Huddersfield were leading 5–1 with just 27 minutes remaining. At that point, Johnny Summers began a passage of play in which he scored five goals and assisted with two others to allow Charlton to win 7–6. Huddersfield become the first, and still the only, team to score six goals in an English Football League match – or any other professional football match – and still be on the losing team.

Ufton's playing career was ended by injury in 1960. He then became a coach at Tooting & Mitcham United in 1961, where he stayed until joining Malcolm Allison as a coach at Plymouth Argyle during the 1964–65 season. He replaced Allison as manager in 1965, managing the club in 117 matches before leaving in 1968. He served as a director of Charlton between 1984 and 2009.

== Personal life ==
Ufton married twice, his first marriage ending in divorce. He had five children. After his playing career he worked as a sporting activities director at the Sportsman Casino in London and was the national chairman of the Lord's Taverners cricket charity.

In later life he lived at Elham between Canterbury and Folkestone. Ufton died at the age of 92 in March 2021.
