= Tony France =

English footballer

Personal information
- Full name: Anthony France
- Date of birth: 11 April 1939 (age 87)
- Place of birth: Sheffield, England
- Position: Striker

Senior career*
Years	Team	Apps	(Gls)
1957–1960	Huddersfield Town	9	(2)
1961–1963	Darlington	47	(9)
1963–1964	Stockport County	30	(8)
- * Club domestic league appearances and goals

Anthony France (born 11 April 1939 in Sheffield) was an English professional footballer who played as a striker for Huddersfield Town, Darlington and Stockport County. Died August 2024
