= Stan Howard (English footballer) =

English footballer

Personal information
- Full name: Stanley Howard
- Date of birth: 1 July 1934
- Place of birth: Chorley, England
- Date of death: 19 June 2004 (aged 69)
- Place of death: Preston, England
- Positions: Centre forward; winger

Senior career*
| Years | Team | Apps | (Gls) |
- Chisnall Rovers
| 1952–1960 | Huddersfield Town | 62 | (13) |
| 1960–1961 | Bradford City | 18 | (6) |
| 1961–1964 | Barrow | 86 | (22) |
| 1964–1965 | Halifax Town | 21 | (1) |
| 1965–1966 | Chorley | | |
| Total | | 187+ | (42+) |
- * Club domestic league appearances and goals

Stanley Howard (1 July 1934 – 19 June 2004) was an English professional football player and coach who played as a midfielder.

== Career ==
Born in Chorley, Howard played for Chisnall Rovers, Huddersfield Town, Bradford City, Barrow, Halifax Town, and Chorley. After retiring as a player he became manager of Chorley's reserve team. His brothers George and Les also played for Chorley.
