= Johnny Summers (footballer) =

English footballer

Personal information
- Full name: John Henry Summers
- Date of birth: 10 September 1927
- Place of birth: Hammersmith, England
- Date of death: 2 June 1962 (aged 34)
- Position: Forward

Youth career
- Fulham

Senior career*
Years	Team	Apps	(Gls)
1949–1950	Fulham	4	(0)
1950–1954	Norwich City	71	(33)
1954–1956	Millwall	91	(41)
1956–1961	Charlton Athletic	171	(100)
Total		337	(174)
- * Club domestic league appearances and goals

Johnny Summers (10 September 1927 – 2 June 1962) was a football striker who scored 104 goals for Charlton Athletic.

Summers engineered one of the most remarkable comebacks in football history; Charlton were 5–1 down against Huddersfield with half an hour to go with only 10 men; they won 7-6 in the Second Division at The Valley, 21 December 1957. Johnny scored five goals, set up two and scored a six-minute hat-trick. Summers later revealed that he changed his boots at half-time after his old pair had started falling apart.

Johnny Summers played for Norwich City, Fulham and Millwall, prior to his Charlton career. He made his debut for Millwall in 1954 in the opening match of the 1954–55 season, against Brighton and Hove Albion, in front of a 25,000 plus crowd at The Den. In a 2–0 win, he disappointed the fickle crowd and after a few weeks disappeared into the Reserves, surfacing again the following January, as a left winger. From that time, he never looked back, and was one of the most fearsome and lethal forwards seen at The Den in years. His transfer to Charlton Athletic, for their last season in the old First Division, was regretted by Millwall fans, but seen as inevitable.

He died at the age of 34 in 1962 of cancer.
