= Tony Conwell =

English footballer

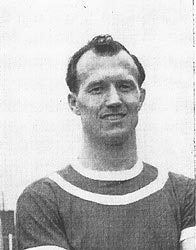

Personal information
- Full name: Anthony Conwell
- Date of birth: 17 January 1932
- Place of birth: Bradford, England
- Date of death: 6 May 2017 (aged 85)
- Position: Right back

Youth career
- –: Sheffield Wednesday

Senior career*
Years	Team	Apps	(Gls)
1953–1955	Sheffield Wednesday	44	(0)
1955–1959	Huddersfield Town	106	(2)
1959–1962	Derby County	98	(1)
1962–1964	Doncaster Rovers	33	(0)
- * Club domestic league appearances and goals

Anthony Conwell (17 January 1932 – 6 May 2017) was an English professional footballer who made 281 appearances in the Football League playing as a right back for Sheffield Wednesday, Huddersfield Town, Derby County and Doncaster Rovers. Conwell died in hospital on 6 May 2017, aged 85.
