= Sandy Kennon =

South African footballer and cricketer

Personal information
- Full name: Neil Sandlands Kennon
- Date of birth: 28 November 1933
- Place of birth: Johannesburg, South Africa
- Date of death: 17 August 2015 (aged 81)
- Position: Goalkeeper

Senior career*
Years	Team	Apps	(Gls)
1956–1958	Huddersfield Town	78	(0)
1958–1965	Norwich City	255	(0)
1965–1967	Colchester United	76	(0)
- Lowestoft Town
Total		409	(0)
- * Club domestic league appearances and goals

Neil Sandilands "Sandy" Kennon (28 November 1933 – 17 August 2015) was a professional footballer and amateur cricketer. His position was goalkeeper. He made 367 appearances in the Football League playing for Huddersfield Town, Norwich City and Colchester United. He also played rugby for Beccles Rugby club

== Career ==
After beginning his career in his native South Africa, where he played for Umbilo FC, Berea Park and Queen's Park, he was spotted by Huddersfield Town while playing for Rhodesia. He signed for the Terriers in 1956 and stayed there for three years before joining Norwich City in early 1959. Kennon was a member of the legendary Norwich team that reached the FA Cup semi-finals in 1959 as a Third Division team and he played in both of the semi-final matches against Luton Town, having replaced the injured Ken Nethercott for the sixth round replay against Sheffield United. The following season, he played a key role as Norwich won promotion to the Second Division of the Football League.

Kennon went on to play for Colchester United and Lowestoft Town before retiring. He was a bookmaker for many years after he stopped playing and also, for a while, had his own band called Sandy Kennon and the Blazers.

Kennon is a member of the Norwich City F.C. Hall of Fame.

Outside of football, Kennon played cricket for Norfolk as a right-handed batsman and right-arm medium pace bowler. Kennon made three appearances for the county in the 1970 Minor Counties Championship. He died on 17 August 2015.

== Honours ==
Norwich City

- Football League Cup: 1961–62
