= 1988–89 Huddersfield Town A.F.C. season =

Huddersfield Town
1988–89 season
- Chairman: Keith Longbottom
- Manager: Eoin Hand
- Stadium: Leeds Road
- Third Division: 14th
- FA Cup: Third round (eliminated by Sheffield United)
- League Cup: First round (eliminated by Scunthorpe United)
- Associate Members' Cup: Area quarter-final (eliminated by Scarborough)
- Top goalscorer: League: Craig Maskell (28); All: Craig Maskell (33)
- Highest home attendance: 15,543 vs Sheffield United (7 January 1989)
- Lowest home attendance: 2,216 vs Scunthorpe United (13 December 1988)
- Biggest win: 6–0 vs Bury (1 April 1989)
- Biggest defeat: 1–6 vs Bristol City (18 April 1989)

Huddersfield Town's 1988–89 campaign was a fairly unsuccessful campaign following the disastrous relegation the previous season. Under the leadership of former Ireland manager Eoin Hand, a disastrous end to the season saw Town finish 14th, just 6 points and 7 places above the relegation zone, despite the 33 goals from Craig Maskell.

== Squad at the start of the season ==
Note: Flags indicate national team as defined under FIFA eligibility rules; some limited exceptions apply. Players may hold more than one non-FIFA nationality.

Pos.	Nation	Player
GK	ENG	Steve Hardwick
GK	ENG	Lee Martin
DF	WAL	Ian Bray
DF	ENG	Malcolm Brown
DF	ENG	Chris Hutchings
DF	ENG	Graham Mitchell
DF	IRL	Ken O'Doherty
DF	ENG	Malcolm Shotton
DF	ENG	Simon Trevitt
DF	ENG	Gordon Tucker
MF	ENG	Mark Barham

Pos.	Nation	Player
MF	ENG	Junior Bent
MF	ENG	Paul France
MF	ENG	Micky Holmes
MF	ENG	Chris Marsden
MF	ENG	Andy May
MF	ENG	Ian McInerney
MF	IRL	Kieran O'Regan
MF	ENG	Julian Winter
FW	ENG	Craig Maskell
FW	ENG	Peter Ward
FW	ENG	Peter Withe

== Review ==
Following the disastrous campaign orchestrated by Steve Smith and Malcolm Macdonald the previous season, it was up to former Ireland manager Eoin Hand and assistant Peter Withe to try to recover Town's perilous position in the 3rd tier of English football. At the start of the season, Town seemed to register a loss and a win every alternate week. Although new signing Craig Maskell (bought using the money funded by the sale of Duncan Shearer during the close-season.) started to score the goals that would try to bring Town up to the play-off spots.

Following relegation the previous season, Huddersfield Town achieved several positive results during January and February. They also played soon-to-be promoted Sheffield United in the FA Cup, losing by a narrow margin.

Also during the season Town recorded their biggest ever away league victory – a 6–0 thrashing of Bury at Gigg Lane. Bizarrely, Town would lose 6–0 at Bury the following season. In the last 7 games, Town lost 5 of them and drew the other 2. But, on a positive note, Craig Maskell broke a post-war goalscoring record of 32 goals set by Jimmy Glazzard in the 1954–55 season, by scoring his 33rd goal of the season in the last game of the season at home to Wigan Athletic.

== Squad at the end of the season ==
Note: Flags indicate national team as defined under FIFA eligibility rules; some limited exceptions apply. Players may hold more than one non-FIFA nationality.

Pos.	Nation	Player
GK	ENG	Steve Hardwick
GK	ENG	Lee Martin
DF	WAL	Ian Bray
DF	ENG	Andy Duggan
DF	ENG	Chris Hutchings
DF	ENG	Graham Mitchell
DF	IRL	Ken O'Doherty
DF	ENG	Simon Trevitt
DF	ENG	Gordon Tucker
MF	ENG	Junior Bent
MF	ENG	Paul France

Pos.	Nation	Player
MF	ENG	Chris Marsden
MF	ENG	Andy May
MF	ENG	Ian McInerney
MF	IRL	Kieran O'Regan
MF	ENG	Mark Smith
MF	ENG	Julian Winter
FW	IRL	Mick Byrne
FW	ENG	Mike Cecere
FW	ENG	Craig Maskell
FW	ENG	Peter Withe

== Results ==
=== Division Three ===
Date	Opponents	Home/ Away	Result F – A	Scorers	Attendance	Position
27 August 1988	Brentford	A	0–1		5,632	20th
3 September 1988	Preston North End	H	2–0	Maskell, Shotton	5,622	12th
10 September 1988	Cardiff City	A	0–3		3,891	18th
17 September 1988	Gillingham	H	1–1	Hutchings	4,688	18th
20 September 1988	Notts County	H	3–1	Byrne (2), Maskell (pen)	5,655	11th
24 September 1988	Chester City	A	0–3		3,319	14th
1 October 1988	Fulham	H	2–0	Maskell (2)	4,576	10th
3 October 1988	Port Vale	A	0–2		5,938	11th
8 October 1988	Northampton Town	A	3–1	Bent, Hutchings, Maskell (pen)	3,975	10th
15 October 1988	Bristol City	H	0–1		5,952	16th
22 October 1988	Aldershot	A	1–0	Hutchings	2,155	12th
25 October 1988	Swansea City	H	1–1	Hutchings	5,711	12th
29 October 1988	Bristol Rovers	A	1–5	Hutchings	4,460	15th
5 November 1988	Sheffield United	H	3–2	Byrne, Maskell (2)	10,400	14th
8 November 1988	Bolton Wanderers	H	0–1		7,802	15th
12 November 1988	Wolverhampton Wanderers	A	1–4	Maskell	12,697	16th
26 November 1988	Wigan Athletic	A	2–0	Maskell, Cecere	2,779	14th
3 December 1988	Blackpool	H	1–1	Maskell	5,738	15th
17 December 1988	Bury	H	3–2	Bent, O'Regan, Maskell	5,150	12th
26 December 1988	Chesterfield	A	1–1	Bent	5,539	13th
31 December 1988	Mansfield Town	A	0–1		4,628	14th
2 January 1989	Southend United	H	3–2	Maskell, Bent, Byrne	6,403	14th
14 January 1989	Preston North End	A	0–1		6,959	14th
21 January 1989	Cardiff City	H	1–0	Bent	4,869	11th
28 January 1989	Gillingham	A	2–1	Maskell, O'Regan	3,530	10th
4 February 1989	Fulham	A	2–1	O'Doherty, Cecere	4,081	9th
11 February 1989	Port Vale	H	0–0		8,004	9th
18 February 1989	Northampton Town	H	1–2	Maskell (pen)	5,802	10th
28 February 1989	Swansea City	A	1–0	Match abandoned due to floodlight failure.	?
4 March 1989	Aldershot	H	2–1	Winter, Byrne	4,709	10th
7 March 1989	Reading	H	2–2	Duggan, Maskell	4,933	10th
11 March 1989	Sheffield United	A	1–5	Marsden	13,680	10th
14 March 1989	Bristol Rovers	H	2–3	Cecere, Maskell	4,105	10th
22 March 1989	Swansea City	A	0–1		4,075	12th
25 March 1989	Southend United	A	4–2	Duggan, Byrne, Maskell (2, 1 pen)	3,582	10th
27 March 1989	Chesterfield	H	1–1	Maskell	5,819	11th
1 April 1989	Bury	A	6–0	Cecere, Maskell (3), Smith, Byrne	4,145	10th
5 April 1989	Reading	A	1–2	May	3,802	12th
8 April 1989	Mansfield Town	H	2–0	Maskell, McInerney	5,327	9th
15 April 1989	Chester City	H	3–1	Winter, Smith, May	6,109	9th
18 April 1989	Bristol City	A	1–6	Maskell	4,542	9th
22 April 1989	Notts County	A	0–3		5,499	12th
25 April 1989	Brentford	H	1–2	Maskell	3,538	12th
29 April 1989	Wolverhampton Wanderers	H	0–0		8,757	12th
1 May 1989	Bolton Wanderers	A	1–3	Maskell (pen)	5,511	12th
6 May 1989	Blackpool	A	1–2	Maskell	4,070	14th
13 May 1989	Wigan Athletic	H	1–1	Maskell	4,225	14th

=== FA Cup ===
Date	Round	Opponents	Home/ Away	Result F – A	Scorers	Attendance
19 November 1988	Round 1	Rochdale	H	1–1	May	6,178
28 November 1988	Round 1 Replay	Rochdale	A	4–3	Withe, O'Shaughnessy (og), Maskell, Bent	5,645
10 December 1988	Round 2	Chester City	H	1–0	O'Regan	6,295
7 January 1989	Round 3	Sheffield United	H	0–1		15,543

=== League Cup ===
Date	Round	Opponents	Home/ Away	Result F – A	Scorers	Attendance
30 August 1988	Round 1 1st Leg	Scunthorpe United	A	2–3	Maskell, Mitchell	3,820
6 September 1988	Round 1 2nd Leg	Scunthorpe United	H	2–2	Maskell, Trevitt	4,237: Huddersfield lost 5–4 on aggregate.

=== Associate Members' Cup ===
Date	Round	Opponents	Home/ Away	Result F – A	Scorers	Attendance
13 December 1988	Preliminary Round Group 6	Scunthorpe United	H	1–0	Byrne	2,216
20 December 1988	Preliminary Round Group 6	Halifax Town	A	0–1		2,437
17 January 1989	Round 1	Grimsby Town	A	3–1	Cecere, Maskell, Withe	2,116
21 February 1989	Area Quarter-Final	Scarborough	H	1–2	Maskell	4,665

== Appearances and goals ==
Name	Nationality	Position	League		FA Cup		League Cup		Associate Members' Cup		Total	
Name	Nationality	Position	Apps	Goals	Apps	Goals	Apps	Goals	Apps	Goals	Apps	Goals
Mark Barham	England	MF	1	0	0	0	0	0	0	0	1	0
Junior Bent	England	MF	14 (8)	5	3	1	0	0	2	0	19 (8)	6
Malcolm Brown	England	DF	1	0	0	0	0 (1)	0	0	0	1 (1)	0
Mick Byrne	Republic of Ireland	FW	29 (8)	7	2 (1)	0	0 (1)	0	2	1	13 (10)	8
Mike Cecere	England	FW	28 (3)	4	4	0	0	0	4	1	36 (3)	5
Andy Duggan	England	DF	14	2	0	0	0	0	0	0	14	2
Paul France	England	DF	2 (1)	0	0	0	0	0	1	0	3 (1)	0
Steve Hardwick	England	GK	46	0	4	0	2	0	3	0	55	0
Micky Holmes	England	MF	3 (4)	0	0	0	1	0	0	0	4 (4)	0
Chris Hutchings	England	DF	41	5	4	0	2	0	4	0	51	5
Chris Marsden	England	MF	10 (4)	1	0 (2)	0	2	0	3	0	15 (6)	1
Lee Martin	England	GK	0	0	0	0	0	0	0 (1)	0	0 (1)	0
Craig Maskell	England	FW	46	28	4	1	2	2	4	2	56	33
Andy May	England	MF	45	2	4	1	1	0	4	0	54	3
Ian McInerney	England	MF	5 (5)	1	0	0	0 (1)	0	0	0	5 (6)	1
Graham Mitchell	England	DF	33 (1)	0	4	0	2	1	3	0	42 (1)	1
Ken O'Doherty	Republic of Ireland	DF	37	1	4	0	1	0	3	0	45	1
Kieran O'Regan	Republic of Ireland	MF	36	2	4	1	2	0	4	0	46	3
Malcolm Shotton	England	DF	2	1	0	0	2	0	0	0	4	1
Mark Smith	England	Fw	17 (3)	2	0	0	0	0	0	0	17 (3)	2
Simon Trevitt	England	DF	35 (4)	0	1	0	2	1	1	0	39 (4)	1
Gordon Tucker	England	DF	11 (1)	0	0 (1)	0	1 (1)	0	1 (1)	0	13 (4)	0
Peter Ward	England	FW	1 (3)	0	0	0	0 (1)	0	0	0	1 (4)	0
Julian Winter	England	MF	35	2	4	0	0	0	4	0	43	2
Peter Withe	England	FW	14 (12)	0	2 (1)	1	2	0	0 (2)	1	18 (15)	2
