= 1987–88 Huddersfield Town A.F.C. season =

Huddersfield Town
1987–88 season
- Chairman: Roger B. Fielding; Keith Longbottom
- Manager: Steve Smith (until 6 October 1987); Malcolm Macdonald (from 12 October 1987 until 4 May 1988)
- Stadium: Leeds Road
- Second Division: 23rd (relegated)
- FA Cup: Third round (eliminated by Manchester City)
- League Cup: First round (eliminated by Rotherham United)
- Full Members' Cup: First round (eliminated by Leicester City)
- Top goalscorer: League: Duncan Shearer (10); All: Duncan Shearer (16)
- Highest home attendance: 21,510 vs Manchester City (25 January 1988)
- Lowest home attendance: 2,794 vs AFC Bournemouth (30 April 1988)
- Biggest win: 2–0 vs AFC Bournemouth (21 November 1987)
- Biggest defeat: 1–10 vs Manchester City (7 November 1987)

Huddersfield Town's 1987–88 campaign is statistically Town's worst ever season in their league history. Town won only 6 league games all season, had their heaviest ever defeat in their history, conceded 100 league goals in the season and finished 19 points adrift of safety and even 14 points behind 2nd-bottom team Reading. They were relegated from the Second Division to the Third after the season.

The team had two managers during the season, Steve Smith and Malcolm Macdonald. Macdonald never managed again after his half-season in Huddersfield, and said that the club-record 10–1 loss to Manchester City still haunted him, and his reputation, decades later.

== Squad at the start of the season ==
Note: Flags indicate national team as defined under FIFA eligibility rules; some limited exceptions apply. Players may hold more than one non-FIFA nationality.

Pos.	Nation	Player
GK	ENG	Brian Cox
GK	ENG	Lee Martin
DF	WAL	Ian Bray
DF	ENG	Malcolm Brown
DF	ENG	David Burke
DF	SCO	Willie McStay
DF	ENG	Graham Mitchell
DF	ENG	Simon Trevitt
DF	ENG	Gordon Tucker
DF	ENG	Simon Webster
MF	ENG	Ian Banks

Pos.	Nation	Player
MF	ENG	Mark Barham
MF	ENG	Junior Bent
MF	ENG	David Cowling
MF	ENG	Paul France
MF	ENG	Carl Madrick
MF	ENG	Andy May
MF	ENG	Julian Winter
FW	ENG	Graham Cooper
FW	ENG	David Cork
FW	SCO	Duncan Shearer
FW	ENG	Peter Ward

== Review ==
The start of the season was at the time, the worst in Town's history. The team lost most of their early games and Steve Smith, a hero during his playing days at Leeds Road, was shown the door on 6 October, after the 2–0 defeat at Birmingham City. Malcolm Macdonald replaced Smith a week later, but it wasn't until the end of the month that Town registered their first win, a 2–1 victory at the end-of-season champions Millwall.

However, a week later, Town recorded their biggest ever loss in their history, going down 10–1 against Manchester City at Maine Road. After that embarrassment, Town recovered slightly going on a run of only 1 defeat in 6 matches. However, this proved to be nothing more than a false dawn and Town's chances of survival would shortly become non-existent.

Following their 2–1 win over Plymouth Argyle on 12 December, Town would only win 2 matches for the remaining 5 months of the season, they were a 1–0 win at Bradford City and amazingly a 1–0 win against a Manchester City side, who 4 months earlier beat them 10–1. They were officially relegated with four games remaining, after a 2–2 draw at home to near neighbours Oldham Athletic, and Town ended up with only 28 points, finishing 14 points behind Reading in 23rd place and a further 5 behind the safety zone of 21st placed West Bromwich Albion. Macdonald was sacked just before the last game of the season against Sheffield United. Eoin Hand would replace Macdonald for the new season in the Third Division.

== Squad at the end of the season ==
Note: Flags indicate national team as defined under FIFA eligibility rules; some limited exceptions apply. Players may hold more than one non-FIFA nationality.

Pos.	Nation	Player
GK	ENG	Brian Cox
GK	ENG	Lee Martin
DF	WAL	Ian Bray
DF	ENG	Malcolm Brown
DF	ENG	Vince Chapman
DF	ENG	Chris Hutchings
DF	ENG	Graham Mitchell
DF	ENG	Malcolm Shotton
DF	ENG	Simon Trevitt
DF	ENG	Gordon Tucker
MF	ENG	Ian Banks

Pos.	Nation	Player
MF	ENG	Mark Barham
MF	ENG	Junior Bent
MF	ENG	Paul France
MF	ENG	Carl Madrick
MF	ENG	Andy May
MF	ENG	Julian Winter
FW	ENG	Graham Cooper
FW	ENG	David Cork
FW	ENG	Paul Kirkham
FW	SCO	Duncan Shearer
FW	ENG	Peter Ward

== Results ==
=== Division Two ===
Date	Opponents	Home/ Away	Result F–A	Scorers	Attendance	Position
15 August 1987	Crystal Palace	H	2–2	Trevitt, Shearer	6,132	6th
22 August 1987	Plymouth Argyle	A	1–6	Ward	8,811	21st
29 August 1987	Shrewsbury Town	H	0–0		4,478	20th
31 August 1987	Oldham Athletic	A	2–3	Shearer, Banks	7,410	21st
12 September 1987	Blackburn Rovers	A	2–2	May, Cooper	7,109	23rd
15 September 1987	Leeds United	H	0–0		9,085	22nd
19 September 1987	Aston Villa	H	0–1		6,884	23rd
26 September 1987	Stoke City	A	1–1	Cooper	8,665	23rd
29 September 1987	Bradford City	H	1–2	Shearer	11,671	23rd
3 October 1987	Birmingham City	A	0–2		6,282	23rd
10 October 1987	Middlesbrough	H	1–4	Shearer	6,169	23rd
17 October 1987	Reading	A	2–3	Shearer (2)	4,678	23rd
20 October 1987	Hull City	H	0–2		8,033	23rd
24 October 1987	West Bromwich Albion	A	2–3	Cork, Shearer	8,450	23rd
31 October 1987	Millwall	H	2–1	Banks, Cork	5,504	23rd
3 November 1987	Ipswich Town	A	0–3		9,984	23rd
7 November 1987	Manchester City	A	1–10	May (pen)	19,583	23rd
14 November 1987	Barnsley	H	2–2	Ward, Banks	8,629	23rd
21 November 1987	Bournemouth	A	2–0	Cork, Banks	6,419	23rd
28 November 1987	Leicester City	H	1–0	Cooper	6,704	22nd
1 December 1987	Swindon Town	A	1–4	Cooper	6,963	22nd
5 December 1987	Sheffield United	A	2–2	Banks, Cooper	9,269	22nd
12 December 1987	Plymouth Argyle	H	2–1	Cork (2)	5,747	21st
19 December 1987	Leeds United	A	0–3		20,111	21st
26 December 1987	Stoke City	H	0–3		9,500	21st
28 December 1987	Aston Villa	A	1–1	Shearer	20,948	21st
1 January 1988	Shrewsbury Town	A	1–3	Cork	5,448	23rd
2 January 1988	Blackburn Rovers	H	1–2	May (pen)	10,735	23rd
16 January 1988	Crystal Palace	A	1–2	Shearer	9,013	23rd
13 February 1988	Swindon Town	H	0–3		5,458	23rd
27 February 1988	Birmingham City	H	2–2	Banks, Barham	5,441	23rd
1 March 1988	Bradford City	A	1–0	Banks	12,782	23rd
5 March 1988	Reading	H	0–2		6,094	23rd
12 March 1988	Middlesbrough	A	0–2		13,866	23rd
19 March 1988	Millwall	A	1–4	Mitchell	6,181	23rd
26 March 1988	West Bromwich Albion	H	1–3	Cork	4,503	23rd
2 April 1988	Manchester City	H	1–0	Madrick	7,835	23rd
4 April 1988	Barnsley	A	0–1		7,950	23rd
8 April 1988	Ipswich Town	H	1–2	Banks	4,023	23rd
19 April 1988	Oldham Athletic	H	2–2	Shearer, Banks	5,547	23rd
23 April 1988	Hull City	A	0–4		5,221	23rd
30 April 1988	Bournemouth	H	1–2	Cork	2,794	23rd
2 May 1988	Leicester City	A	0–3		9,803	23rd
7 May 1988	Sheffield United	H	0–2		8,644	23rd

=== FA Cup ===
Date	Round	Opponents	Home/ Away	Result F–A	Scorers	Attendance
9 January 1988	Round 3	Manchester City	H	2–2	Shearer (2)	18,102
12 January 1988	Round 3 replay	Manchester City	A	0–0		24,565
25 January 1988	Round 3 2nd replay	Manchester City	H	0–3		21,510

=== League Cup ===
Date	Round	Opponents	Home/ Away	Result F–A	Scorers	Attendance
18 August 1987	Round 1 1st Leg	Rotherham United	A	4–4	Shearer (3), Barham	3,353
25 August 1987	Round 1 2nd Leg	Rotherham United	H	1–3	Shearer	4,528: Huddersfield lost 7–5 on aggregate.

=== Full Members Cup ===
Date	Round	Opponents	Home/ Away	Result F–A	Scorers	Attendance
10 November 1987	Round 1	Leicester City	A	0–1		3,440

== Appearances and goals ==
Name	Nationality	Position	League		FA Cup		League Cup		Full Members' Cup		Total	
Name	Nationality	Position	Apps	Goals	Apps	Goals	Apps	Goals	Apps	Goals	Apps	Goals
Ian Banks	England	MF	41	9	2	0	2	0	1	0	46	9
Mark Barham	England	MF	24 (2)	1	0	0	1 (1)	1	1	0	26 (3)	2
Junior Bent	England	MF	5 (2)	0	0 (1)	0	0	0	0	0	5 (3)	0
Ian Bray	Wales	DF	29 (1)	0	3	0	0	0	1	0	33 (1)	0
Malcolm Brown	England	DF	23 (2)	0	2	0	1	0	0	0	26 (2)	0
David Burke	England	DF	10	0	0	0	2	0	0	0	12	0
Vince Chapman	England	DF	4 (2)	0	0	0	0	0	0	0	4 (2)	0
Graham Cooper	England	FW	20 (5)	5	0 (2)	0	0 (1)	0	0	0	20 (8)	5
David Cork	England	FW	36	8	3	0	2	0	1	0	42	8
David Cowling	England	MF	5 (1)	0	0	0	1	0	0	0	6 (1)	0
Brian Cox	England	GK	20	0	3	0	2	0	0	0	25	0
Paul France	England	DF	5 (3)	0	3	0	0	0	0	0	8 (3)	0
Chris Hutchings	England	DF	23	0	0	0	0	0	0	0	23	0
Paul Kirkham	England	FW	0 (1)	0	0	0	0	0	0	0	0 (1)	0
Carl Madrick	England	FW	3 (5)	1	0	0	0	0	0	0	3 (5)	1
Lee Martin	England	GK	18	0	0	0	0	0	1	0	19	0
Andy May	England	MF	27 (1)	3	3	0	2	0	1	0	33 (1)	3
Seamus McDonagh	Republic of Ireland	GK	6	0	0	0	0	0	0	0	6	0
Willie McStay	Scotland	DF	4 (4)	0	0	0	0	0	1	0	5 (4)	0
Graham Mitchell	England	DF	28 (1)	1	3	0	0	0	0	0	31 (1)	1
Duncan Shearer	Scotland	FW	31 (2)	10	3	2	2	4	1	0	37 (2)	16
Malcolm Shotton	England	DF	14	0	0	0	0	0	0	0	14	0
Simon Trevitt	England	DF	31 (6)	1	3	0	2	0	0	0	36 (6)	1
Gordon Tucker	England	DF	19 (4)	0	0 (1)	0	2	0	0 (1)	0	21 (6)	0
Steve Walford	England	DF	12	0	0	0	0	0	1	0	13	0
Peter Ward	England	FW	19 (7)	2	2	0	1	0	1	0	23 (7)	2
Simon Webster	England	DF	22	0	3	0	2	0	1	0	28	0
Julian Winter	England	MF	5 (2)	0	0	0	0	0	0 (1)	0	5 (3)	0
