= 1989–90 Huddersfield Town A.F.C. season =

Huddersfield Town
1989–90 season
- Chairman: Keith Longbottom
- Manager: Eoin Hand
- Stadium: Leeds Road
- Third Division: 8th
- FA Cup: Fourth round (eliminated by Crystal Palace)
- League Cup: Second round (eliminated by Nottingham Forest)
- Associate Members' Cup: First round (eliminated by Rotherham United)
- Top goalscorer: League: Craig Maskell (14); All: Craig Maskell (20)
- Highest home attendance: 13,262 vs Nottingham Forest (3 October 1989)
- Lowest home attendance: 1,714 vs Doncaster Rovers (7 November 1989)
- Biggest win: 5–1 vs Cardiff City (17 March 1990)
- Biggest defeat: 0–6 vs Bury (16 April 1990)

Huddersfield Town's 1989–90 campaign was a fairly successful season, with the exception of Town's failure of reaching the play-offs, after they finished in 8th place, just 2 places and 4 points off the play-offs.

== Squad at the start of the season ==
Note: Flags indicate national team as defined under FIFA eligibility rules; some limited exceptions apply. Players may hold more than one non-FIFA nationality.

Pos.	Nation	Player
GK	ENG	Steve Hardwick
GK	ENG	Lee Martin
DF	ENG	Aidy Boothroyd
DF	WAL	Ian Bray
DF	ENG	Andy Duggan
DF	ENG	Chris Hutchings
DF	WAL	Dudley Lewis
DF	ENG	Graham Mitchell
DF	IRL	Ken O'Doherty
DF	ENG	Simon Trevitt

Pos.	Nation	Player
DF	ENG	Robert Wilson
MF	ENG	Junior Bent
MF	ENG	Chris Marsden
MF	ENG	Andy May
MF	IRL	Kieran O'Regan
FW	IRL	Mick Byrne
FW	ENG	Mike Cecere
FW	ENG	Craig Maskell
FW	SCO	Iffy Onuora
FW	ENG	Peter Withe

== Review ==
Following a disappointing first season back in the 3rd Division, many were wondering if Town were going to mount any serious promotion challenge, and if Craig Maskell was going to carry on his goalscoring form from the previous season. Town did start the season brightly and only lost two of their first 13 league games.

The middle part of the season saw Town carry on their good start to the season and during the Christmas/New Year season, they won 6 out of 8 and by February, Town reached 5th place, with a play-off place at least seeming to be the minimum requirement for Town's season. However, from February onwards, Town's promotion dreams took a major downward spiral into nothingness.

Among the notable records set by Town at the end of the season was an unwanted streak of five consecutive home league defeats between 3 March and 3 April. In April, Bury defeated Town 6–0 at Gigg Lane, exactly 12 months after Town had beaten them 6–0 at the same ground. On a positive note, Craig Maskell became only the third Town player to score four goals in an away match during a 5–1 win at Cardiff City, matching the achievement of Charlie Wilson and George Brown. (This record was later surpassed by Jordan Rhodes, who scored five goals in Town’s 6–0 win over Wycombe Wanderers in the 2011–12 season.)

== Squad at the end of the season ==
Note: Flags indicate national team as defined under FIFA eligibility rules; some limited exceptions apply. Players may hold more than one non-FIFA nationality.

Pos.	Nation	Player
GK	ENG	Steve Hardwick
GK	ENG	Lee Martin
DF	ENG	Aidy Boothroyd
DF	WAL	Ian Bray
DF	ENG	Simon Charlton
DF	ENG	Andy Duggan
DF	ENG	Chris Hutchings
DF	WAL	Dudley Lewis
DF	ENG	Graham Mitchell
DF	IRL	Ken O'Doherty
DF	ENG	Simon Trevitt
DF	ENG	Robert Wilson

Pos.	Nation	Player
MF	ENG	Kevin Donovan
MF	ENG	John Kelly (on loan from Walsall)
MF	ENG	Chris Marsden
MF	ENG	Andy May
MF	IRL	Kieran O'Regan
FW	IRL	Mick Byrne
FW	ENG	Mike Cecere
FW	ENG	Peter Maguire
FW	ENG	Craig Maskell
FW	SCO	Iffy Onuora
FW	ENG	Peter Withe

== Results ==
=== Division Three ===
Date	Opponents	Home/ Away	Result F – A	Scorers	Attendance	Position
19 August 1989	Swansea City	H	1–0	Cecere	5,775	6th
26 August 1989	Walsall	A	3–2	Wilson, Smith, Onuora	4,173	3rd
2 September 1989	Bolton Wanderers	H	1–1	O'Regan	7,872	4th
9 September 1989	Preston North End	A	3–3	Smith, Hutchings, Wilson	5,822	5th
16 September 1989	Brentford	H	1–0	Smith	5,578	3rd
22 September 1989	Tranmere Rovers	A	0–4		7,375	4th
26 September 1989	Fulham	A	0–0		4,445	8th
30 September 1989	Leyton Orient	H	2–0	Cecere (2, 1 pen)	5,258	7th
7 October 1989	Cardiff City	H	2–3	Marsden, O'Regan	5,835	9th
14 October 1989	Reading	A	0–0		3,950	10th
17 October 1989	Wigan Athletic	H	2–0	Maskell, Smith	5,119	7th
21 October 1989	Birmingham City	A	1–0	Smith	7,951	6th
28 October 1989	Shrewsbury Town	H	1–1	Bent	6,001	6th
1 November 1989	Bristol Rovers	A	2–2	Cecere, Smith	6,467	6th
4 November 1989	Chester City	A	1–2	Wilson	2,660	9th
11 November 1989	Northampton Town	H	2–2	Smith, Mitchell	4,973	9th
25 November 1989	Notts County	H	1–2	Short (og)	5,416	10th
2 December 1989	Mansfield Town	A	2–1	Wilson, Hutchings	2,966	9th
16 December 1989	Rotherham United	A	0–0		6,673	10th
26 December 1989	Bury	H	2–1	Maskell, O'Connell	8,483	8th
30 December 1989	Bristol City	H	2–1	Smith, Maskell	7,681	5th
1 January 1990	Blackpool	A	2–2	Hutchings, Onuora	5,097	6th
13 January 1990	Walsall	H	1–0	Marsden	5,856	6th
21 January 1990	Swansea City	A	3–1	Wilson, Hutchings (2)	4,488	5th
3 February 1990	Tranmere Rovers	H	1–0	Onuora	7,005	3rd
10 February 1990	Brentford	A	1–2	Wilson	6,774	4th
17 February 1990	Mansfield Town	H	1–0	Maskell	5,441	4th
24 February 1990	Notts County	A	0–1		7,632	7th
3 March 1990	Crewe Alexandra	H	0–1		5,933	7th
6 March 1990	Leyton Orient	A	0–1		3,040	7th
10 March 1990	Fulham	H	0–1		4,780	8th
13 March 1990	Crewe Alexandra	A	0–3		4,384	8th
17 March 1990	Cardiff City	A	5–1	Maskell (4), O'Regan	2,628	8th
20 March 1990	Reading	H	0–1		4,588	8th
24 March 1990	Wigan Athletic	A	2–1	Byrne, Maskell	3,167	8th
31 March 1990	Birmingham City	H	1–2	Withe	5,837	9th
3 April 1990	Preston North End	H	0–2		4,381	9th
7 April 1990	Shrewsbury Town	A	3–3	Byrne, Maskell (2, 1 pen)	2,867	9th
10 April 1990	Bristol Rovers	H	1–1	Kelly	4,359	9th
14 April 1990	Blackpool	H	2–2	Byrne, Maskell (pen)	4,845	9th
16 April 1990	Bury	A	0–6		4,621	10th
21 April 1990	Rotherham United	H	2–1	Edwards (2)	4,963	8th
24 April 1990	Bristol City	A	1–1	Duggan	17,791	8th
28 April 1990	Northampton Town	A	0–1		2,388	8th
1 May 1990	Bolton Wanderers	A	2–2	Edwards, Maskell	8,550	8th
5 May 1990	Chester City	H	4–1	Byrne, Maskell, Edwards, Reeves (og)	3,514	8th

=== FA Cup ===
Date	Round	Opponents	Home/ Away	Result F – A	Scorers	Attendance
18 November 1989	Round 1	Hartlepool United	A	2–0	Cecere (2, 1 pen)	3,160
9 December 1989	Round 2	Chesterfield	A	2–0	Cecere (pen), Maskell	6,687
6 January 1990	Round 3	Grimsby Town	H	3–1	Smith, Maskell, Lever (og)	9,901
27 January 1990	Round 4	Crystal Palace	A	0–4		12,920

=== League Cup ===
Date	Round	Opponents	Home/ Away	Result F – A	Scorers	Attendance
22 August 1989	Round 1 1st Leg	Doncaster Rovers	H	1–1	Onuora	3,983
29 August 1989	Round 1 2nd Leg	Doncaster Rovers	A	2–1	Wilson (2)	3,985: Huddersfield won 3–2 on aggregate.
20 September 1989	Round 2 1st Leg	Nottingham Forest	A	1–1	O'Doherty	18,976
3 October 1989	Round 2 2nd Leg	Nottingham Forest	H	3 – 3 (aet: 90 mins: 3 – 3)	Maskell (2), Cecere	13,262: 4–4 on aggregate. Town lost on away goals rule.

=== Associate Members' Cup ===
Date	Round	Opponents	Home/ Away	Result F – A	Scorers	Attendance
7 November 1989	Preliminary Round Group 5	Doncaster Rovers	H	2–2	Smith, Maskell	1,714
12 December 1989	Preliminary Round Group 5	Grimsby Town	A	3–3	Onuora, Maskell (pen), Duggan	991
9 January 1990	Round 1	Rotherham United	A	0–3		3,519

== Appearances and goals ==
Name	Nationality	Position	League		FA Cup		League Cup		Associate Members' Cup		Total	
Name	Nationality	Position	Apps	Goals	Apps	Goals	Apps	Goals	Apps	Goals	Apps	Goals
Junior Bent	England	MF	6 (1)	1	0	0	1	0	1	0	8 (1)	1
Aidy Boothroyd	England	DF	9 (1)	0	0	0	0	0	0	0	9 (1)	0
Ian Bray	Wales	DF	13 (1)	0	2	0	0	0	1	0	16 (1)	0
Mick Byrne	Republic of Ireland	FW	17 (2)	4	0	0	0	0	0	0	17 (2)	4
Mike Cecere	England	FW	22 (1)	4	3 (1)	3	4	1	1	0	30 (2)	8
Simon Charlton	England	DF	1 (2)	0	0	0	0	0	0	0	1 (2)	0
Kevin Donovan	England	MF	1	0	0	0	0	0	0	0	1	0
Andy Duggan	England	DF	15	1	0	0	0	0	2	1	17	2
Keith Edwards	England	MF	6 (4)	4	0	0	0	0	0	0	6 (4)	4
Steve Hardwick	England	GK	21	0	1	0	4	0	1	0	27	0
Chris Hutchings	England	DF	46	5	4	0	4	0	3	0	57	5
John Kelly	England	MF	9 (1)	1	0	0	0	0	0	0	9 (1)	1
Dudley Lewis	Wales	DF	28	0	3	0	4	0	2	0	37	0
Peter Maguire	England	FW	0 (3)	0	0	0	0	0	0	0	0 (3)	0
Chris Marsden	England	MF	29 (3)	2	4	0	3 (1)	0	3	0	39 (4)	2
Lee Martin	England	GK	25	0	3	0	0	0	2	0	30	0
Craig Maskell	England	FW	40 (1)	15	4	2	4	2	3	2	51 (1)	21
Andy May	England	MF	40 (1)	0	3	0	2	0	3	0	48 (1)	0
Graham Mitchell	England	DF	35 (2)	1	4	0	2 (1)	0	1	0	42 (3)	1
Brendan O'Connell	England	FW	11	1	0	0	0	0	0	0	11	1
Ken O'Doherty	Republic of Ireland	DF	17 (1)	0	1	0	4	1	1	0	23 (1)	1
Iffy Onuora	Scotland	FW	3 (17)	3	2 (1)	0	0 (3)	1	1 (1)	1	6 (22)	5
Kieran O'Regan	Republic of Ireland	MF	31 (6)	3	3 (1)	0	2 (1)	0	2 (1)	0	38 (9)	3
Mark Smith	England	FW	39 (5)	7	4	1	3	0	3	1	49 (5)	9
Simon Trevitt	England	DF	7	0	0	0	3	0	0	0	10	0
Robert Wilson	England	MF	27 (1)	6	3	0	4	2	3	0	37 (1)	8
Peter Withe	England	FW	8 (4)	1	0 (1)	0	2	0	0 (1)	0	10 (6)	1
