= 1990–91 Huddersfield Town A.F.C. season =

Huddersfield Town
1990–91 season
- Chairman: Keith Longbottom
- Manager: Eoin Hand
- Stadium: Leeds Road
- Third Division: 11th
- FA Cup: Second round (eliminated by Blackpool)
- League Cup: First round (eliminated by Bolton Wanderers)
- Associate Members' Cup: Preliminary round (bottom of Group 8)
- Top goalscorer: League: Iwan Roberts (13); All: Kieran O'Regan; Iwan Roberts (14)
- Highest home attendance: 9,697 vs Bradford City (2 December 1990)
- Lowest home attendance: 1,405 vs Hartlepool United (28 November 1990)
- Biggest win: 4–0 vs Bolton Wanderers (8 September 1990); 4–0 vs Rotherham United (19 March 1991)
- Biggest defeat: 0–4 vs Grimsby Town (18 September 1990)

Huddersfield Town's 1990–91 campaign was a very mediocre season for the Terriers, with Town finishing 11th in Eoin Hand's third season in charge. They finished only 4 places and 6 points off the play-offs.

== Squad at the start of the season ==
Note: Flags indicate national team as defined under FIFA eligibility rules; some limited exceptions apply. Players may hold more than one non-FIFA nationality.

Pos.	Nation	Player
GK	ENG	Steve Hardwick
GK	ENG	Lee Martin
DF	ENG	Simon Charlton
DF	WAL	Dudley Lewis
DF	ENG	Graham Mitchell
DF	IRL	Ken O'Doherty
DF	ENG	Neil Parsley
DF	ENG	Simon Trevitt
DF	ENG	Robert Wilson

Pos.	Nation	Player
MF	ENG	Gary Barnett
MF	ENG	Kevin Donovan
MF	ENG	Keith Edwards
MF	ENG	Chris Marsden
MF	IRL	Kieran O'Regan
FW	IRL	Dave Campbell
FW	SCO	Iffy Onuora
FW	WAL	Iwan Roberts
FW	ENG	Mark Smith

== Review ==
Following the departure of Craig Maskell to Reading during the close season, many Town fans were wondering where Town's goals were going to be coming from for the 1990–91 season. The answer seemed to be their new record signing from Watford, the Welsh international Iwan Roberts, signed for £275,000. In the early part of the season however, he only managed 3 goals in the first 13 league games, which actually made him Town's top scorer at the time along with Keith Edwards. But despite this, Town kept producing wins on a regular period and many still thought that the play-offs at least were still a realistic possibility.

Between November and March, Town were on a very impressive run of only 5 losses in 26 games, including 12 wins. Many of the goals did come from the boot of Iwan Roberts, as well as Kieran O'Regan, who each scored 14 goals in all competitions. Many still believed that Eoin Hand would lead Town to the play-offs and promotion to Division 2.

However, the last seven games saw Town lose four and win only one, which saw Town miss out on the play-offs by only 6 points and 4 places. Town were also awarded a record 14 penalties that season, but they only scored 9 of them, so the record of 11 penalties scored in a season, set in the 1983–84 season remained.

== Squad at the end of the season ==
Note: Flags indicate national team as defined under FIFA eligibility rules; some limited exceptions apply. Players may hold more than one non-FIFA nationality.

Pos.	Nation	Player
GK	ENG	Steve Hardwick
GK	ENG	Lee Martin
DF	ENG	Simon Charlton
DF	ENG	Peter Jackson
DF	WAL	Dudley Lewis
DF	ENG	Graham Mitchell
DF	IRL	Ken O'Doherty
DF	ENG	Neil Parsley
DF	ENG	Simon Trevitt
DF	ENG	Robert Wilson
DF	ENG	Mark Wright
MF	ENG	Gary Barnett

Pos.	Nation	Player
MF	ENG	Kevin Donovan
MF	ENG	Keith Edwards
MF	ENG	Simon Ireland
MF	ENG	John Kelly
MF	ENG	Chris Marsden
MF	IRL	Kieran O'Regan
FW	IRL	Dave Campbell
FW	ENG	Gary Haylock
FW	ENG	Peter Maguire (on loan from Leeds United)
FW	SCO	Iffy Onuora
FW	ENG	Phil Quinlan (on loan from Everton)
FW	WAL	Iwan Roberts

== Results ==
=== Third Division ===
Date	Opponents	Home/ Away	Result F – A	Scorers	Attendance	Position
25 August 1990	Southend United	H	1–2	Wilson	5,219	15th
1 September 1990	Swansea City	A	0–1		4,787	23rd
8 September 1990	Bolton Wanderers	H	4–0	Roberts, Edwards (3)	5,419	12th
15 September 1990	Fulham	A	0–0		3,853	14th
18 September 1990	Grimsby Town	A	0–4		6,158	18th
22 September 1990	Reading	H	0–2		4,689	20th
29 September 1990	Chester City	A	2–1	Donovan, Roberts	1,540	17th
2 October 1990	Exeter City	H	1–0	Onuora	4,317	13th
6 October 1990	Leyton Orient	H	1–0	Jackson	4,686	11th
13 October 1990	Rotherham United	A	3–1	Onuora, O'Regan (pen), Roberts	6,120	8th
20 October 1990	Brentford	A	0–1		5,509	11th
23 October 1990	Bournemouth	H	1–3	O'Regan	5,373	12th
27 October 1990	Mansfield Town	H	2–2	Smith, Wilson	4,413	13th
3 November 1990	Birmingham City	A	2–1	Roberts, O'Regan (pen)	7,412	13th
10 November 1990	Cambridge United	H	3–1	Roberts, Marsden, O'Regan (pen)	4,817	9th
24 November 1990	Preston North End	A	1–1	Onuora	4,646	11th
2 December 1990	Bradford City	H	1–2	Onuora	9,697	13th
15 December 1990	Crewe Alexandra	A	1–1	Barnett	2,590	14th
22 December 1990	Bury	H	2–1	O'Regan (pen), Roberts	4,841	10th
29 December 1990	Stoke City	A	0–2		11,869	14th
1 January 1991	Wigan Athletic	H	1–0	O'Regan	4,887	13th
5 January 1991	Tranmere Rovers	A	0–2		5,626	13th
12 January 1991	Swansea City	H	1–2	Stant	4,052	15th
19 January 1991	Southend United	A	1–0	Smith	5,509	14th
26 January 1991	Fulham	H	1–0	Marsden	4,369	10th
2 February 1991	Grimsby Town	H	1–1	Marsden	6,571	11th
9 February 1991	Bolton Wanderers	A	1–1	Haylock	7,947	11th
16 February 1991	Preston North End	H	1–0	Marsden	5,504	9th
19 February 1991	Shrewsbury Town	A	0–0		2,821	10th
23 February 1991	Cambridge United	A	0–0		5,603	9th
26 February 1991	Tranmere Rovers	H	2–1	Onuora, Haylock	4,889	7th
3 March 1991	Bradford City	A	2–2	Roberts (2)	9,569	7th
9 March 1991	Crewe Alexandra	H	3–1	Swain (og), Roberts, Onuora	5,429	5th
13 March 1991	Exeter City	A	2–2	Haylock (2)	3,625	6th
16 March 1991	Chester City	H	1–1	O'Regan	5,337	7th
19 March 1991	Rotherham United	H	4–0	Marsden, Roberts, O'Regan (pen), Maguire	4,576	6th
23 March 1991	Leyton Orient	A	0–1		3,292	7th
26 March 1991	Reading	A	2–1	Edwards, Roberts	4,231	6th
30 March 1991	Shrewsbury Town	H	2–1	Roberts, Onuora	5,684	5th
1 April 1991	Bury	A	1–2	Quinlan	6,318	6th
6 April 1991	Stoke City	H	3–0	O'Regan, Quinlan, Wright	6,520	6th
13 April 1991	Wigan Athletic	A	1–1	Roberts	4,642	6th
20 April 1991	Brentford	H	1–2	O'Regan (pen)	6,489	7th
27 April 1991	Bournemouth	A	1–3	O'Regan (pen)	6,888	10th
4 May 1991	Mansfield Town	A	0–0		2,507	10th
11 May 1991	Birmingham City	H	0–1		5,195	11th

=== FA Cup ===
Date	Round	Opponents	Home/ Away	Result F – A	Scorers	Attendance
18 November 1990	Round 1	Altrincham	A	2–1	Onuora, Roberts	3,000
10 December 1990	Round 2	Blackpool	H	0–2		6,329

=== League Cup ===
Date	Round	Opponents	Home/ Away	Result F – A	Scorers	Attendance
29 August 1990	Round 1 1st Leg	Bolton Wanderers	H	0–3		4,444
4 September 1990	Round 1 2nd Leg	Bolton Wanderers	A	1–2	O'Regan	3,101: Huddersfield lost 5–1 on aggregate.

=== Associate Members' Cup ===
Date	Round	Opponents	Home/ Away	Result F – A	Scorers	Attendance
7 November 1990	Preliminary round Group 8	Bradford City	A	1–1	O'Regan (pen)	2,941
28 November 1990	Preliminary Round Group 8	Hartlepool United	H	1–4	O'Regan (pen)	1,405

== Appearances and goals ==
Name	Nationality	Position	League		FA Cup		League Cup		Associate Members' Cup		Total	
Name	Nationality	Position	Apps	Goals	Apps	Goals	Apps	Goals	Apps	Goals	Apps	Goals
Gary Barnett	England	MF	19 (3)	1	1	0	2	0	0 (1)	0	37 (5)	5
Dave Campbell	Republic of Ireland	DF	1	0	0	0	0	0	0	0	1	0
Simon Charlton	England	DF	29 (1)	0	2	0	0	0	2	0	33 (1)	0
Kevin Donovan	England	MF	4 (2)	1	0	0	0	0	0	0	4 (2)	1
Keith Edwards	England	MF	10 (8)	4	1	0	1 (1)	0	0 (1)	0	12 (10)	4
Steve Hardwick	England	GK	42	0	1	0	2	0	2	0	47	0
Garry Haylock	England	FW	9 (3)	4	0	0	0	0	0	0	9 (3)	4
Simon Ireland	England	MF	3 (3)	0	0	0	0	0	0	0	3 (3)	0
Peter Jackson	England	DF	38	1	2	0	0	0	1	0	41	1
John Kelly	England	MF	3 (1)	0	0	0	0	0	0	0	3 (1)	0
Dudley Lewis	Wales	DF	4 (2)	0	0	0	2	0	1	0	7 (2)	0
Peter Maguire	England	FW	1 (3)	1	0	0	0	0	0	0	1 (3)	1
Chris Marsden	England	MF	43	5	2	0	2	0	2	0	49	5
Lee Martin	England	GK	4	0	1	0	0	0	0	0	5	0
Graham Mitchell	England	DF	46	0	2	0	2	0	2	0	52	0
Ken O'Doherty	Republic of Ireland	DF	8	0	0	0	0	0	0	0	8	0
Iffy Onuora	Scotland	FW	32 (11)	7	2	1	0 (1)	0	2	0	36 (12)	8
Kieran O'Regan	Republic of Ireland	MF	46	11	2	0	2	1	2	2	52	14
Neil Parsley	England	DF	6 (2)	0	0	0	2	0	0	0	8 (2)	0
Phil Quinlan	England	MF	7 (1)	2	0	0	0	0	0	0	7 (1)	2
Iwan Roberts	Wales	FW	44	13	2	1	2	0	2	0	50	14
Mark Smith	England	Fw	29 (3)	2	1 (1)	0	2	0	2	0	34 (4)	2
Phil Stant	England	FW	5	1	0	0	0	0	0	0	5	1
Simon Trevitt	England	DF	38	0	1	0	2	0	2	0	43	0
Robert Wilson	England	MF	25 (4)	2	2	0	1	0	2	0	30 (4)	2
Mark Wright	England	DF	10	1	0	0	0	0	0	0	10	1
