= 1986–87 Huddersfield Town A.F.C. season =

Huddersfield Town
1986–87 season
- Chairman: Keith Longbottom
- Manager: Mick Buxton (until 22 December 1986); Steve Smith (from 13 January 1987)
- Stadium: Leeds Road
- Second Division: 17th
- FA Cup: Third round (eliminated by Norwich City)
- League Cup: Second round (eliminated by Arsenal)
- Full Members' Cup: First round (eliminated by Blackburn Rovers)
- Top goalscorer: League: Duncan Shearer (21); All: Duncan Shearer (25)
- Highest home attendance: 10,003 vs Bradford City (27 December 1986)
- Lowest home attendance: 1,947 vs Blackburn Rovers (16 September 1986)
- Biggest win: 5–2 vs Bradford City (27 December 1986); 3–0 vs Millwall (9 May 1987)
- Biggest defeat: 0–4 vs Millwall (13 December 1986)

Huddersfield Town's 1986–87 campaign saw the end of Mick Buxton's reign as Huddersfield Town manager, a job he had had for 8 years. Only Clem Stephenson has had a longer reign as manager of the Terriers. He was replaced by Steve Smith in early January 1987, but Town only survived relegation by 3 points, which became a sort of precursor to the debacle that the next season's campaign would bring.

== Squad at the start of the season ==
Note: Flags indicate national team as defined under FIFA eligibility rules; some limited exceptions apply. Players may hold more than one non-FIFA nationality.

Pos.	Nation	Player
GK	ENG	Brian Cox
DF	WAL	Ian Bray
DF	ENG	Malcolm Brown
DF	ENG	David Burke
DF	WAL	Steve Doyle
DF	WAL	Joey Jones
DF	ENG	Graham Mitchell
DF	ENG	Simon Trevitt
DF	ENG	Simon Webster

Pos.	Nation	Player
DF	ENG	Paul Wilson
MF	ENG	David Cowling
MF	ENG	Andy Thackeray
MF	ENG	Phil Wilson
MF	ENG	Julian Winter
FW	ENG	Graham Cooper
FW	ENG	David Cork
FW	ENG	Paul Raynor
FW	SCO	Duncan Shearer

== Review ==
The start of the season was mixed, with no win until 20 September, when they surprisingly beat near neighbours and early league leaders Oldham Athletic 5–4 at Leeds Road despite playing with ten men for much of the game. The main highlight of the early part of the season was a Littlewoods Cup tie against Arsenal, in which Town only lost 3–1 on aggregate.

The middle part of the season didn't prove to be much better, a run of 4 consecutive losses including a 4–3 loss at Bradford City, but that was reconciled when they beat them 5–2 on 27 December. Just before beating Bradford, Mick Buxton's tenure as Town manager ended after 8 years in charge. He was replaced by coach Steve Smith.

Smith's tenure started with a 4–2 defeat by Norwich City, but during March, Town went on a run of six consecutive draws – a club record. Town finished the season in 17th, just 3 points and 3 places above the drop zone. Little did Town fans know what was going to happen to Town the following season.

== Squad at the end of the season ==
Note: Flags indicate national team as defined under FIFA eligibility rules; some limited exceptions apply. Players may hold more than one non-FIFA nationality.

Pos.	Nation	Player
GK	ENG	Brian Cox
DF	WAL	Ian Bray
DF	ENG	Malcolm Brown
DF	ENG	David Burke
DF	WAL	Joey Jones
DF	SCO	Willie McStay
DF	ENG	Graham Mitchell
DF	ENG	Simon Trevitt
DF	ENG	Simon Webster

Pos.	Nation	Player
DF	ENG	Paul Wilson
MF	ENG	Ian Banks
MF	ENG	David Cowling
MF	ENG	Julian Winter
MF	ENG	Phil Wilson
FW	ENG	Graham Cooper
FW	ENG	David Cork
FW	SCO	Duncan Shearer
FW	ENG	Peter Ward

== Results ==
=== Division Two ===
Date	Opponents	Home/ Away	Result F–A	Scorers	Attendance	Position
23 August 1986	Sunderland	H	0–2		9,937	20th
30 August 1986	West Bromwich Albion	A	0–1		9,250	20th
6 September 1986	Leeds United	H	1–1	Shearer	9,306	21st
9 September 1986	Crystal Palace	A	0–1		6,601	21st
13 September 1986	Birmingham City	A	1–1	Dicks (og)	6,934	20th
20 September 1986	Oldham Athletic	H	5–4	Raynor (2), Shearer (2), Brown (pen)	7,368	19th
27 September 1986	Portsmouth	A	0–1		9,022	20th
4 October 1986	Derby County	H	2–0	Cork, Raynor	7,690	19th
11 October 1986	Stoke City	A	0–2		7,543	20th
18 October 1986	Sheffield United	A	0–0		9,243	21st
21 October 1986	Shrewsbury Town	H	2–1	Shearer (2)	4,097	16th
25 October 1986	Hull City	H	1–3	Banks (pen)	5,406	19th
1 November 1986	Ipswich Town	A	0–3		10,211	19th
8 November 1986	Brighton & Hove Albion	H	2–1	Shearer, Banks	4,463	17th
15 November 1986	Bradford City	A	3–4	Raynor, McDermott, Banks (pen)	8,011	19th
22 November 1986	Plymouth Argyle	H	1–2	Webster	4,874	20th
13 December 1986	Millwall	A	0–4		3,515	22nd
20 December 1986	Crystal Palace	H	1–2	Shearer	4,181	22nd
26 December 1986	Blackburn Rovers	A	2–1	Shearer, Barker (og)	7,144	20th
27 December 1986	Bradford City	H	5–2	Shearer (4), Banks	10,003	19th
1 January 1987	Grimsby Town	H	0–0		7,530	19th
3 January 1987	Leeds United	A	1–1	Banks	17,983	19th
24 January 1987	Sunderland	A	1–2	Winter	10,486	21st
7 February 1987	West Bromwich Albion	H	2–1	Shearer, Cork	5,218	22nd
14 February 1987	Shrewsbury Town	A	2–1	Banks, Shearer	3,285	18th
17 February 1987	Reading	A	2–3	Cork, Shearer	4,664	18th
21 February 1987	Portsmouth	H	2–0	Shearer, Banks	6,229	18th
28 February 1987	Oldham Athletic	A	0–2		8,911	18th
3 March 1987	Birmingham City	H	2–2	Cooper, Cork	5,177	18th
7 March 1987	Hull City	A	0–0		5,872	17th
14 March 1987	Sheffield United	H	1–1	Banks	7,568	18th
21 March 1987	Stoke City	H	2–2	Shearer, Cork	7,222	18th
31 March 1987	Barnsley	H	2–2	Shearer (2)	7,569	19th
3 April 1987	Brighton & Hove Albion	A	1–1	Shearer	7,516	19th
8 April 1987	Derby County	A	0–2		15,432	19th
11 April 1987	Ipswich Town	H	1–2	McCall (og)	5,888	20th
18 April 1987	Grimsby Town	A	1–0	Jones	4,198	20th
20 April 1987	Blackburn Rovers	H	1–2	Cork	7,731	21st
25 April 1987	Plymouth Argyle	A	1–1	Cork	13,342	21st
2 May 1987	Reading	H	2–0	Shearer, Phil Wilson	4,549	19th
4 May 1987	Barnsley	A	1–0	Cooper	8,564	18th
9 May 1987	Millwall	H	3–0	Jones, Cork (2)	6,955	17th

=== FA Cup ===
Date	Round	Opponents	Home/ Away	Result F–A	Scorers	Attendance
10 January 1987	Round 3	Norwich City	A	1–1	Shearer	11,524
21 January 1987	Round 3 replay	Norwich City	H	2–4	Brown (pen), Cork	8,970

=== League Cup ===
Date	Round	Opponents	Home/ Away	Result F–A	Scorers	Attendance
26 August 1986	Round 1 1st Leg	Halifax Town	H	3–1	Cork, Cowling, Shearer	2,636
2 September 1986	Round 1 2nd Leg	Halifax Town	A	2–2	Cork, Shearer	1,353: Huddersfield won 5–3 on aggregate.
23 September 1986	Round 2 1st Leg	Arsenal	A	0–2		15,194
7 October 1986	Round 2 2nd Leg	Arsenal	H	1–1	Banks	8,713: Huddersfield lost 3–1 on aggregate.

=== Full Members' Cup ===
Date	Round	Opponents	Home/ Away	Result F–A	Scorers	Attendance
16 September 1986	Round 1	Blackburn Rovers	H	1–2	Shearer	1,947

== Appearances and goals ==
Name	Nationality	Position	League		FA Cup		League Cup		Full Members' Cup		Total	
Name	Nationality	Position	Apps	Goals	Apps	Goals	Apps	Goals	Apps	Goals	Apps	Goals
Ian Banks	England	MF	37	8	2	0	2	1	0	0	41	9
Ian Bray	Wales	DF	13	0	0	0	3	0	1	0	17	0
Malcolm Brown	England	DF	33	1	2	1	3	0	0	0	38	2
David Burke	England	DF	21	0	2	0	0	0	0	0	23	0
Graham Cooper	England	FW	7 (5)	2	0 (1)	0	1 (2)	0	1	0	9 (8)	2
David Cork	England	FW	31 (5)	9	2	1	3 (1)	2	0	0	36 (6)	12
David Cowling	England	MF	34	0	2	0	4	1	1	0	41	1
Brian Cox	England	GK	37	0	2	0	4	0	1	0	44	0
Andy Dibble	Wales	GK	5	0	0	0	0	0	0	0	5	0
Steve Doyle	Wales	MF	5	0	0	0	2	0	0	0	7	0
Joey Jones	Wales	DF	29 (1)	2	0	0	4	0	0	0	33 (1)	2
Brian McDermott	England	MF	4	1	0	0	0	0	0	0	4	1
Willie McStay	Scotland	DF	0 (1)	0	0	0	0	0	0	0	0 (1)	0
Graham Mitchell	England	DF	16 (1)	0	2	0	1	0	1	0	20 (1)	0
Paul Raynor	England	MF	18 (2)	4	0 (1)	0	3	0	1	0	22 (3)	4
Duncan Shearer	Scotland	FW	42	21	2	1	4	2	1	1	49	25
Andy Thackeray	England	MF	2	0	0	0	0	0	0 (1)	0	2 (1)	0
Simon Trevitt	England	DF	9 (2)	0	0	0	1	0	1	0	11 (2)	0
Peter Ward	England	FW	4 (3)	0	0	0	0	0	0	0	4 (3)	0
Simon Webster	England	DF	39	1	2	0	3	0	1	0	45	1
Paul Wilson	England	DF	8	0	0	0	1	0	0	0	9	0
Phil Wilson	England	MF	37 (1)	1	2	0	4	0	1	0	44 (1)	1
Julian Winter	England	MF	31	1	2	0	1 (1)	0	1	0	35 (1)	1
