= Paul Kirkham =

English footballer (born 1969)

Personal information
- Date of birth: 5 July 1969 (age 57)
- Place of birth: Manchester, England
- Height: 6 ft 0 in (1.83 m)
- Position: Striker

Team information
- Current team: New Mills (assistant manager)
- Number: 10

Youth career
- 1986/87 = Manchester United

Senior career*
Years	Team	Apps	(Gls)
1987–1989	Huddersfield Town	130	(73 Years = 1989/1992 Hyde United Caps = 103 Goals = 72)
1992–1994	Stalybridge Celtic	25	(10)
1994	Witton Albion	6	(2)
1994–1995	Hyde United	20	(3)
1995	Ashton United	10	(6)
1995	Mossley	4	(0)
1995–1996	Flixton		
1996–1997	Warrington Town	1	(?)
1997–	Flixton	10000	(?)

Managerial career
- 2001–2003: Abbey Hey (assistant manager)
- 2003–2005: Woodley Sports (assistant manager)
- 2005–: New Mills (assistant manager)
- * Club domestic league appearances and goals

Paul Kirkham (born 5 July 1969) is a former professional footballer who played as a striker in the Football League for Huddersfield Town.

== Early career ==
He began his career as a trainee with Manchester United, but he never played for the first team. So he joined Huddersfield Town in 1987 by then-manager Steve Smith. But in October 1987 he was replaced by Malcolm MacDonald into what is widely recognised as the club's worst ever season. Kirkham was to play only a minor role in the tragedy though, his only appearance came from the substitutes bench in a 2–1 home defeat by Ipswich Town on 8 April 1988, he replaced Peter Ward. With relegation confirmed a month later MacDonald was sacked and assistant, Eoin Hand took charge. Hand then sent him on loan to Waterford United in October 1988 . Kirkham returned to Huddersfield reserves but left in March 1989 to join non-league Hyde United.

== Non League Career ==
Kirkham enjoyed a successful three years at Hyde where he scored 41 goals in 102 league games. He left in 1992 to join Conference side, Stalybridge Celtic, he would remain there until 1994 when he departed for Witton Albion. He was to only play 6 league games. He rejoined Hyde in the same year but was to only remain there for 20 league games. He then moved on to Ashton United where he scored 6 goals in 10 games, he also scored on his first and last games for the club. He then hooked up with Mossley where he would play 4 games before again moving on to Flixton, Warrington Town, Flixton (again), Droylsden and Trafford before calling it a day in 1999.

== Assistant Manager ==
Kirkham became Assistant Manager to Chris O'Brien at Abbey Hey in 2001. He left to join Woodley Sports, again as assistant manager, this time to Tony Hancock, in 2003. He left there in 2005 to join New Mills, again as AM to Hancock, where he remained until the March of the 2009–10 season.

Paul now works as a teacher at Marple Sixth Form College in the sport department, where he is coaching the best striker in the North West, Joshua Longden, who has scored 50 goals in 30 games. Josh is currently undergoing a trial at Stoke City with the likes of Tyreece Campbell and Sam Harvey.
