= Liversedge (disambiguation) =

Liversedge is a town in West Yorkshire.

Liversedge may also refer to:

== People ==
- Alfred John Liversedge (1854-1934), British engineer, manager, and author
- Harry B. Liversedge (1894–1951), American brigadier general.
- Ian Liversedge, sports physiotherapist
- Nick Liversedge (born 1988), English footballer
- Sydney Liversedge (1897-1979), British captain, and first world war aviator

== Others ==
- Liversedge F.C.
- Liversedge RFC
