= David Cork =

David Cork may refer to:

- David Cork (footballer, born 1959), English former footballer who played as a midfielder for Doncaster Rovers and Sydney Olympic
- David Cork (footballer, born 1962), English former footballer for Arsenal, GAIS, Huddersfield Town, West Bromwich Albion, Scunthorpe United, Darlington and Boston United
