= Madrick =

Madrick is a surname. Notable people with the surname include:

- Carl Madrick (born 1968), English footballer
- Jeff Madrick (born 1947), American journalist, economist, and writer
