= 1989–90 Swindon Town F.C. season =

- Chairman: Brian Hillier
- Manager: Osvaldo Ardiles
- Ground: County Ground, Swindon
- Division Two: 4th
- FA Cup: 3rd round
- League Cup: 4th round
- Full Members Cup: Semi-final (South)
- Top goalscorer: League: Duncan Shearer (21); All: Duncan Shearer (27)
- Highest home attendance: 16,208 (vs. Leeds United)
- Lowest home attendance: 5,544 (vs. Shrewsbury Town)
Home colours

The 1989–90 season was Swindon Town's third season in the Division Two since their promotion from the third tier of English football in 1987. Alongside the league campaign, Swindon Town also competed in the FA Cup, League Cup and the Full Members Cup.

== Second Division ==
Pos	Team	Pld	W	D	L	GF	GA	GD	Pts	Qualification or relegation
2	Sheffield United (P)	46	24	13	9	78	58	+20	85	Promotion to the First Division
3	Newcastle United	46	22	14	10	80	55	+25	80	Qualification for the Second Division play-offs
4	Swindon Town (Note: Swindon Town were disqualified from promotion after being found guilty of making illegal payments, and the play-off runners-up Sunderland were promoted in their place.) (O)	46	20	14	12	79	59	+20	74	Qualification for the Second Division play-offs
5	Blackburn Rovers	46	19	17	10	74	59	+15	74	Qualification for the Second Division play-offs
6	Sunderland (P)	46	20	14	12	70	64	+6	74	Qualification for the Second Division play-offs

Source: Statto
Rules for classification: 1) Points; 2) Goal difference; 3) Goals scored
(O) Play-off winners; (P) Promoted

=== Second Division play-offs ===
The semifinals were decided over two legs. The final consisted of only a single match.
The full results can be found at: Football League Division Two play-offs 1990.

Semifinals; 1st leg – 13 May; 2nd leg – 16 May 1990
3rd	Newcastle United	0	0	0
6th	Sunderland	0	2	2
4th	Swindon Town	2	2	4
5th	Blackburn Rovers	1	1	2

Final at Wembley; 28 May 1990
6th	Sunderland (Note: Following successful prosecutions against Swindon Town and the club chairman, Brian Hillier, after they admitted 36 breaches of League rules — 35 of which are related to illegal payments, Swindon remained in the Second Division and Sunderland took their promotion place (see History of Swindon Town F.C.).)	0
4th	Swindon Town	1

== Results and Line-Ups ==
=== Division Two ===
Date	Opposition	V	Score	1	2	3	4	5	6	7	8	9	10	11	12	14
19/08/89	Sunderland	H	0-2	Digby	Hockaday	King	McLoughlin	Calderwood	Parkin_{1}	Galvin_{2}	Shearer	White	MacLaren	Simpson	Cornwell_{1}	Ardiles_{2}
26/08/89	Oldham Athletic	A	2-2	Digby	Barnard	King	McLoughlin	Calderwood	Parkin	Galvin	Shearer_{1}	White	MacLaren	Simpson	Summerbee	Ardiles_{1}
03/09/89	Wolverhampton Wanderers	H	3-1	Digby	Barnard_{2}	King	McLoughlin	Calderwood	Gittens	Jones	Shearer_{1}	White	MacLaren	Galvin	Cornwell_{2}	Summerbee_{1}
09/09/89	West Ham United	A	1-1	Digby	Barnard	King	McLoughlin	Calderwood	Gittens	Jones	Close	White	MacLaren	Galvin_{1}	Cornwell_{1}	Hunt
12/09/89	Sheffield United	A	0-2	Digby	Barnard_{2}	King	McLoughlin	Calderwood	Gittens	Jones_{1}	Close	White	MacLaren	Galvin	Cornwell_{2}	Simpson_{1}
16/09/89	Barnsley	H	0-0	Digby	Barnard	King	McLoughlin	Calderwood	Gittens	Jones_{1}	Shearer	Close	MacLaren_{2}	Simpson	Bodin_{1}	Hunt_{2}
23/09/89	Leeds United	A	0-4	Digby	Hockaday	King	McLoughlin	Calderwood	Gittens	Jones	Shearer	Bodin	MacLaren	Simpson_{1}	Close	Galvin_{1}
26/09/89	Plymouth Argyle	H	3-0	Digby	Hockaday	King	McLoughlin	Calderwood	Gittens	Jones_{1}	Shearer_{2}	Close	MacLaren	Simpson	Bodin_{1}	Galvin_{2}
30/09/89	Bradford City	A	1-1	Digby	Hockaday	King	McLoughlin_{1}	Calderwood	Gittens	Jones	Shearer	Bodin	MacLaren	Galvin_{2}	Simpson_{2}	White_{1}
07/10/89	Hull City	A	3-2	Digby	Hockaday	King_{1}	McLoughlin	Calderwood	Parkin	Bodin	Shearer	White	MacLaren	Simpson	Close	Jones_{1}
14/10/89	Ipswich Town	H	3-0	Digby	Hockaday	King	McLoughlin	Calderwood	Parkin	Jones	Shearer	White	MacLaren	Bodin_{1}	Galvin	Cornwell_{1}
17/10/89	Oxford United	H	3-0	Digby	Hockaday	King	McLoughlin	Calderwood	Parkin	Jones	Hunt_{2}	White	MacLaren	Bodin_{1}	Galvin_{2}	Cornwell_{1}
21/10/89	Leicester City	A	1-2	Digby	Hockaday	King	McLoughlin	Calderwood	Parkin	Jones	Hunt	White	MacLaren	Bodin	Cornwell	Gittens
01/11/89	Brighton	A	2-1	Digby	Hockaday	King_{1}	McLoughlin	Calderwood	Gittens	Jones_{2}	Shearer	White	MacLaren	Simpson	Bodin_{1}	Hunt_{2}
04/11/89	Stoke City	H	6-0	Digby	Hockaday	Bodin	McLoughlin	Calderwood	Gittens	Jones	Shearer	White	MacLaren	Simpson_{1}	Cornwell	Hunt
11/11/89	Middlesbrough	A	2-0	Digby	Cornwell	Bodin	McLoughlin	Calderwood	Gittens	Jones	Shearer	White	MacLaren	Simpson_{1}	Close	Galvin_{1}
18/11/89	Port Vale	A	0-2	Digby	Cornwell_{1}	Bodin	McLoughlin	Calderwood	Gittens	Jones	Shearer	White_{2}	MacLaren	Simpson	Foley_{1}	Close_{2}
26/11/89	Portsmouth	H	2-2	Digby	Kerslake	Bodin	McLoughlin	Calderwood	Gittens	Jones	Shearer	White	MacLaren_{1}	Simpson	Foley_{1}	Cornwell
02/12/89	Sunderland	A	2-2	Digby	Kerslake	Bodin	McLoughlin	Calderwood	Gittens	Jones	Shearer	White_{1}	MacLaren	Foley_{2}	Cornwell_{2}	Simpson_{1}
05/12/89	Bournemouth	H	2-3	Digby	Kerslake	Bodin	McLoughlin	Calderwood	Gittens	Jones	Shearer	White	MacLaren	Simpson_{1}	Cornwell	Simpson_{1}
10/12/89	Sheffield United	H	0-2	Digby	Kerslake_{1}	Bodin	McLoughlin	Calderwood	Gittens	Jones	Shearer	White	MacLaren	Foley	Cornwell_{1}	Hunt
17/12/89	West Brom	A	2-1	Digby	Kerslake	Bodin	McLoughlin	Calderwood	Gittens	Jones_{2}	Shearer	White_{1}	MacLaren	Foley	Cornwell_{1}	Galvin_{2}
26/12/89	Blackburn Rovers	H	4-3	Digby	Kerslake_{2}	Bodin	McLoughlin	Calderwood	Gittens	Jones	Shearer	White_{1}	MacLaren	Foley	Cornwell_{2}	Hockaday_{1}
30/12/89	Newcastle United	H	1-1	Digby	Kerslake	Bodin	McLoughlin	Calderwood	Gittens	Jones	Shearer	White	MacLaren	Foley_{1}	Cornwell	Hockaday_{1}
01/01/90	Watford	A	2-0	Digby	Kerslake	Bodin	McLoughlin	Calderwood	Gittens	Jones_{1}	Shearer	White	MacLaren	Foley	Cornwell_{1}	Hockaday
13/01/90	Oldham Athletic	H	3-2	Digby	Kerslake	Bodin	McLoughlin	Calderwood	Gittens	Jones_{1}	Shearer	White	MacLaren	Foley	Cornwell_{1}	Close
20/01/90	Wolves	A	1-2	Digby	Kerslake	Bodin	McLoughlin	Calderwood	Gittens	Jones	Shearer	White	MacLaren	Foley_{1}	Cornwell	Hockaday_{1}
04/02/90	Leeds United	H	3-2	Digby	Kerslake	Bodin	McLoughlin	Calderwood	Gittens	Jones	Shearer	White	MacLaren	Foley	Hockaday	Hunt
10/02/90	Barnsley	A	1-0	Digby	Kerslake	Bodin	McLoughlin	Calderwood	Gittens	Jones_{2}	Shearer	White_{1}	MacLaren	Foley	Cornwell_{2}	Close_{1}
18/02/90	West Ham United	H	2-2	Digby	Kerslake	Bodin	McLoughlin	Calderwood	Gittens	Jones	Shearer	White	MacLaren	Foley	Hockaday	Close
24/02/90	Portsmouth	A	1-1	Digby	Kerslake	Bodin	McLoughlin	Calderwood	Gittens	Jones	Shearer	White_{1}	MacLaren	Foley	Hockaday	Simpson_{1}
03/03/90	Port Vale	H	3-0	Digby	Kerslake	Bodin	McLoughlin	Calderwood	Gittens	Jones	Shearer	White	MacLaren_{2}	Foley_{1}	Hockaday_{2}	Simpson_{1}
06/03/90	Bradford City	H	3-1	Digby	Kerslake	Bodin	McLoughlin_{2}	Calderwood	Gittens	Jones	Shearer	White	MacLaren	Foley_{1}	Hockaday_{2}	Simpson_{1}
10/03/90	Plymouth Argyle	A	3-0	Digby	Kerslake	Bodin	McLoughlin	Calderwood	Gittens	Jones	Shearer	White	MacLaren	Simpson	Cornwell	Hockaday
17/03/90	Hull City	H	1-3	Digby	Kerslake	Bodin	McLoughlin	Calderwood	Gittens	Jones	Shearer	White_{1}	MacLaren	Simpson	Hockaday	Close_{1}
20/03/90	Ipswich Town	A	0-1	Digby	Kerslake	Bodin	McLoughlin	Calderwood	Gittens	Jones_{1}	Shearer	White_{2}	MacLaren	Simpson	Hockaday_{1}	Close_{2}
24/03/09	Oxford United	A	2-2	Digby	Kerslake	Bodin	McLoughlin	Calderwood	Gittens	Jones	Shearer	White	MacLaren_{1}	Simpson	Cornwell_{1}	Close
31/03/90	Leicester City	H	1-1	Digby	Kerslake	Bodin	McLoughlin	Calderwood	Gittens	Jones	Shearer	White	MacLaren_{1}	Simpson	Hockaday_{1}	Close
07/04/90	Bournemouth	A	2-1	Dearden	Kerslake	Bodin	McLoughlin_{2}	Calderwood	Gittens	Jones	Shearer	White_{1}	MacLaren	Simpson	Close_{1}	Cornwell_{2}
10/04/90	Brighton	H	1-2	Digby	Kerslake	Bodin	McLoughlin	Calderwood	Gittens	Jones	Shearer_{1}	White	MacLaren	Simpson_{2}	Hockaday_{2}	Close_{1}
14/04/90	Watford	H	2-0	Digby	Kerslake	Bodin	McLoughlin_{2}	Calderwood	Gittens	Jones	Shearer	White	MacLaren	Simpson_{1}	Foley_{1}	Close_{2}
16/04/90	Blackburn Rovers	A	1-2	Digby	Kerslake_{2}	Bodin	McLoughlin	Calderwood	Gittens	Jones	Shearer	White	MacLaren	Foley_{1}	Simpson_{1}	Cornwell_{2}
21/04/90	West Brom	H	2-1	Digby	Hockaday	Bodin	McLoughlin	Calderwood	Gittens	Jones	Shearer	White	MacLaren	Foley_{1}	Simpson_{1}	Close
25/04/90	Newcastle United	A	0-0	Digby	Kerslake	Bodin	McLoughlin	Calderwood	Gittens	Jones	Shearer	White	MacLaren	Foley	Cornwell	Simpson
28/04/90	Middlesbrough	H	1-1	Digby	Kerslake_{2}	Bodin	McLoughlin	Calderwood	Gittens	Jones	Shearer	White	MacLaren	Foley_{1}	Simpson_{1}	Hockaday_{2}
05/05/90	Stoke City	A	1-1	Digby	Kerslake	Bodin	McLoughlin	Calderwood	Gittens	Jones_{1}	Shearer_{2}	White	MacLaren	Foley	Cornwell_{2}	Simpson_{1}

_{1} 1st Substitution, _{2} 2nd Substitution.

=== Division Two play-offs ===
Date	Opposition	V	Score	1	2	3	4	5	6	7	8	9	10	11	12	14
13/05/90	Blackburn Rovers	A	2-1	Digby	Kerslake	Bodin	McLoughlin_{1}	Calderwood	Gittens	Jones	Shearer	White	MacLaren	Foley	Simpson_{1}	Cornwell
16/05/90	Blackburn Rovers	H	2-1	Digby	Kerslake	Bodin	McLoughlin_{1}	Calderwood	Gittens	Jones	Shearer	White	MacLaren	Foley	Simpson_{1}	Hockaday
28/05/90	Sunderland	N	1-0	Digby	Kerslake	Bodin	McLoughlin	Calderwood	Gittens	Jones	Shearer	White	MacLaren	Foley	Simpson	Hockaday

_{1} 1st Substitution, _{2} 2nd Substitution.

=== FA Cup ===
Date	Opposition	V	Score	1	2	3	4	5	6	7	8	9	10	11	12	14
06/01/90	Bristol City	A	1-2	Digby	Kerslake	Bodin	McLoughlin	Calderwood	Gittens	Jones_{1}	Shearer	White	MacLaren	Foley	Cornwell	Hockaday_{1}

_{1} 1st Substitution, _{2} 2nd Substitution.

=== League Cup ===
Date	Opposition	V	Score	1	2	3	4	5	6	7	8	9	10	11	12	14
19/09/89	Shrewsbury Town	A	3-0	Digby	Hockaday	King	McLoughlin	Calderwood	Gittens	Jones	Shearer_{1}	Bodin	MacLaren	Simpson_{2}	Close_{1}	Galvin_{2}
03/10/89	Shrewsbury Town	H	3-1	Digby	Hockaday	King_{2}	Bodin	Calderwood	Gittens	Jones_{1}	Shearer	White	MacLaren	Simpson	McLoughlin_{1}	Close_{2}
24/10/89	Bolton Wanderers	H	3-3	Digby	Hockaday_{1}	King	McLoughlin	Calderwood	Gittens	Bodin_{2}	Shearer	White	MacLaren	Simpson	Hunt_{2}	Jones_{1}
07/11/89	Bolton Wanderers	A	1-1	Digby	Hockaday_{1}	Bodin	McLoughlin	Calderwood	Gittens	Jones	Shearer	White_{2}	MacLaren	Simpson	Cornwell_{1}	Hunt_{2}
14/11/89	Bolton Wanderers	A	1-1	Digby	Cornwell	Bodin	McLoughlin_{2}	Calderwood	Gittens	Jones	Shearer	White_{1}	MacLaren	Simpson	Close_{1}	Galvin_{2}
21/11/89	Bolton Wanderers	H	2-1	Digby	Cornwell_{1}	Bodin	McLoughlin	Calderwood	Gittens	Foley	Shearer	White_{2}	MacLaren	Simpson	Galvin_{1}	Close_{2}
29/11/89	Southampton	H	0-0	Digby	Kerslake_{2}	Bodin	McLoughlin	Calderwood	Gittens	Jones	Shearer	White_{1}	MacLaren	Foley	Cornwell_{2}	Simpson_{1}
16/01/89	Southampton	A	2-4	Digby	Kerslake	Bodin	McLoughlin	Calderwood	Gittens	Jones_{1}	Shearer	White	MacLaren	Foley	Cornwell_{1}	Close

_{1} 1st Substitution, _{2} 2nd Substitution.

=== Full Members Cup ===
Date	Opposition	V	Score	1	2	3	4	5	6	7	8	9	10	11	12	14
13/12/89	Millwall	H	2-1	Digby	Kerslake	Bodin	McLoughlin	Calderwood	Gittens	Jones	Shearer	White	MacLaren	Foley_{1}	Cornwell_{1}	Hunt
24/01/90	Norwich City	H	4-1	Digby	Kerslake	Bodin	McLoughlin	Calderwood	Gittens	Jones	Shearer	White	MacLaren	Foley	Hockaday	Close
13/02/90	Crystal Palace	A	0-1	Digby	Kerslake	Bodin	McLoughlin	Calderwood	Gittens	Jones	Shearer	White	MacLaren	Foley	Hockaday	Cornwell

_{1} 1st Substitution, _{2} 2nd Substitution.
