= Ian Banks =

Ian Banks may refer to:

- Iain Banks (1954–2013), Scottish writer
- Ian Banks (One Tree Hill), fictional character on the American television series One Tree Hill
- Ian Banks (footballer) (born 1961), former footballer and current manager of A.F.C. Emley
