= David Cork (footballer, born 1962) =

English association football player (born 1962)

Personal information
- Full name: David Cork
- Date of birth: 28 October 1962 (age 64)
- Place of birth: Doncaster, England
- Height: 5 ft 9 in (1.75 m)
- Positions: Forward; midfielder

Youth career
- 1978–1980: Arsenal

Senior career*
Years	Team	Apps	(Gls)
1980–1984	Arsenal	7	(1)
1980	→ GAIS (loan)	6	(0)
1985–1988	Huddersfield Town	110	(5)
1988	→ West Bromwich Albion (loan)	4	(0)
1988–1989	Scunthorpe United	15	(0)
1989–1992	Darlington	105	(25)
1992	Boston United	6	(0)
- Worksop Town
- * Club domestic league appearances and goals

David Cork (born 28 October 1962) is an English former professional footballer who made 200 appearances in the Football League for Arsenal, Huddersfield Town, West Bromwich Albion, Scunthorpe United and Darlington in the 1980s and early 1990s. He played as a forward or midfielder.

== Career ==
David Cork was born on 29 October 1962 in Doncaster, in what was then the West Riding of Yorkshire. He played representative football at district and county schools level, and had a trial with his home-town club, Doncaster Rovers, before signing schoolboy forms with Arsenal in 1978. He turned professional in 1980, and the same year spent time on loan at Swedish second-tier club GAIS. Mainly a reserve-team player during his time at Arsenal, Cork helped them win the Football Combination title in 1983–84. He made his first-team debut on 17 December 1983 against Watford in the First Division, a game Arsenal won 3–1. He made eight appearances in the 1983–84 season, the last of which was against Liverpool on 11 February 1984, and scored once, against Southampton in December 1983. He did not play a single first-team match during the 1984–85 season and was released in the summer of 1985.

Cork signed for Second Division club Huddersfield Town, under the management of Mick Buxton. He made his debut in the opening match of the season, scored Huddersfield Town's 4000th league goal a week later (with help from the opposing goalkeeper), and finished the season with eight goals from 38 league appearances. Two of his nine goals in the 1986–87 season came in a 3–0 win at home to Millwall in the final fixture, which Huddersfield had needed to win to be sure of avoiding relegation. Against a background of changes at managerial and board level, the team spent much of 1987–88 in the relegation places. Cork played in the club-record 10–1 loss to Manchester City, and was transfer-listed at his own request in March 1988.

He spent a month on loan to West Bromwich Albion of the Second Division in September and October 1988, and had a trial with First Division Norwich City later in the year, before joining Mick Buxton at Scunthorpe United in February 1989 on a non-contract basis. He made 15 Fourth Division appearances as Scunthorpe fell just short of automatic promotion, and played in both legs of the play-off semi-final defeat to Wrexham.

Cork then moved into non-league football with Darlington. He missed only one match as Darlington won the 1989–90 Conference title and with it promotion to the Fourth Division, and scored 12 league goals, including an eight-minute hat-trick against Boston United for whose second element he variously "wrong-footed", "cut inside" and "bamboozled" opponents "and sent his shot into the net from the narrowest of angles". Manager Brian Little said he "always loved Corky, he would always be able to do something different". He helped them gain a second successive promotion, scoring in the last match of the 1990–91 season, a 2–0 win against Rochdale that confirmed Darlington as champions, but in 1991–92 his contribution was not enough to prevent their relegation from the Third back to the Fourth. He spent the beginning of the following season with Boston United in the Conference, and then played for Worksop Town.

In 2013, Cork was living in Doncaster, where he worked as a machinist for an aluminium manufacturer.

== Career statistics ==
Appearances and goals by club, season and competition
Club	Season	League			FA Cup		League Cup		Other		Total	
Club	Season	Division	Apps	Goals	Apps	Goals	Apps	Goals	Apps	Goals	Apps	Goals
Arsenal	1982–83	First Division	0	0	0	0	0	0	0	0	0	0
Arsenal	1983–84	First Division	7	1	1	0	0	0	—		7	1
Arsenal	1984–85	First Division	0	0	0	0	0	0	—		0	0
Arsenal	Total		7	1	1	0	0	0	0	0	8	1
Huddersfield Town	1985–86	Second Division	38	8	2	0	2	0	—		42	8
Huddersfield Town	1986–87	Second Division	36	9	2	1	4	2	—		42	12
Huddersfield Town	1987–88	Second Division	36	8	3	0	3	0	—		42	8
Huddersfield Town	1988–89	Third Division	0	0	0	0	0	0	0	0	0	0
Huddersfield Town	Total		110	25	7	1	9	2	—		126	28
West Bromwich Albion (loan)	1988–89	Second Division	4	0	—		—		—		4	0
Scunthorpe United	1988–89	Fourth Division	15	0	—		—		2 (Note: Appearances in Football League Fourth Division play-offs)	0	17	0
Darlington	1989–90	Football Conference	41	12	5	1	—		5 (Note: Four appearances and three goals in FA Trophy, one appearance and one goal in Conference League Cup)	4	51	17
Darlington	1990–91	Fourth Division	34	8	1	0	4	2	3 (Note: Appearance(s) in Associate Members' Cup)	0	42	10
Darlington	1991–92	Third Division	30	3	1	0	2	0	1	0	34	3
Darlington	Total		105	23	7	1	6	2	9	4	127	30
Boston United	1992–93	Football Conference	6	0	—		—		—		6	0
Career total			247	49	15	2	15	4	11	4	288	59

== Honours ==
Arsenal Reserves

- Football Combination: 1983–84

Darlington

- Football Conference: 1989–90
- Football League Fourth Division: 1990–91
