= Duncan Shearer =

Scottish footballer (born 1962)

Personal information
- Full name: Duncan Nichol Shearer
- Date of birth: 28 August 1962 (age 64)
- Place of birth: Fort William, Scotland
- Height: 1.80 m (5 ft 11 in)
- Position: Striker

Senior career*
Years	Team	Apps	(Gls)
1979–1983	Clachnacuddin	?	(?)
1983–1986	Chelsea	2	(1)
1986–1988	Huddersfield Town	83	(38)
1988–1992	Swindon Town	164	(79)
1992	Blackburn Rovers	6	(1)
1992–1997	Aberdeen	152	(54)
1997–2002	Inverness Caledonian Thistle	55	(17)
Total		462	(190)

International career
1994–1995	Scotland	7	(2)
1995–1996	Scotland B	2	(1)

Managerial career
- 2004–2008: Buckie Thistle
- * Club domestic league appearances and goals

Duncan Nichol Shearer (born 28 August 1962) is a Scottish former professional footballer, currently coaching the 'Development squad' at Inverness Caledonian Thistle. During his playing career, he predominantly played as a striker for Huddersfield Town, Swindon Town, Aberdeen and Inverness. He also captained the Scotland B national team and played seven times for the full Scotland national team.

Since his retirement from playing, Shearer has had spells as assistant manager at Aberdeen and Inverness, as well as managing in the Highland League with Buckie Thistle. He is the brother of fellow former Clachnacuddin and English League player, Dave Shearer. He also played shinty as a youth.

== Club career ==
=== Early years ===
Shearer was born in Fort William. Having had an unsuccessful trial with Partick Thistle as a teenager, Shearer began his career as a striker at Scottish Highland Football League club, Clachnacuddin F.C. in Inverness.

While playing with Clach, the then-Aberdeen manager, Alex Ferguson, watched Shearer on several occasions and subsequently invited him to play in a reserve team match on a Wednesday evening at Pittodrie. However, early in the afternoon of the game, the Clachnacuddin chairman received a telephone call from Aberdeen to inform him that the reserve fixture that evening had been cancelled. The Chairman had to rush down to Inverness railway station and 'haul' Shearer off the train to Aberdeen. No further invitations for a trial at Aberdeen materialised at that time. However, later in his career, Shearer did get the opportunity to sign for the Dons.

=== Huddersfield Town ===
From Clachnacuddin, Shearer moved to Chelsea in 1983. He left at the end of the 1985–86 season after appearing in only two League games in his three-year spell at the London club, scoring one goal, although he stated he learned a lot during his time at Stamford Bridge.

He signed for Second Division Huddersfield Town, scored a hat-trick in his first full game for the club (a 3–1 win against Barnsley) and was top goalscorer for 1986–87 and 1987–1988, whilst also being named the team's Player of the Year for 1987, and being including in the publication Huddersfield Town F.C. - The Fans' Favourites during the club's centenary in 2008.

However, he was unable to prevent Huddersfield's relegation to the Third Division at the end of the 1987–88 season. Weeks before this, the unrelated English striker Alan Shearer (aged 17) had scored a hat-trick in the First Division for Southampton against Arsenal, a game which Arsenal captain Tony Adams missed through injury. In his autobiography 11 years later, Adams said that he had followed the progress of the game on Ceefax and mistakenly believed that the Shearer who scored the hat-trick was Duncan Shearer.

=== Swindon Town ===
He was approached by Lou Macari, who offered a club record fee of £250,000 for Shearer to join Swindon in 1988, and fill the striker position following Dave Bamber and Jimmy Quinn exiting the Wiltshire club. In his first season, he was sidelined due to an injured foot and later a groin strain, but managed to score 14 goals in the 45 league games he took part in and was the club's top scorer for that season. In the 1989–90 season he scored 21 league goals for Swindon as well as the winning goal in the semi-final play-offs against Blackburn Rovers, and was part of the team that won promotion at Wembley – only to be demoted due to financial irregularities at the club.

In all he was top scorer for Swindon in every season he was at the club. He was Player of the Year in 1991 and was named in the PFA Team of the Year for Division Two.

=== Blackburn Rovers ===
In March 1992 Shearer was sold to Blackburn Rovers for £800,000. Despite scoring on his debut, he only played six games for Rovers under his boyhood hero, manager Kenny Dalglish, helping the club reach the playoffs where they were ultimately promoted, before he returned to Scotland at the end of the season, to be replaced at Rovers by his namesake Alan. Although officially signed due to an injury to Mike Newell (who coincidentally also later played for Aberdeen), it has been suggested that Rovers only purchased Shearer to weaken Swindon's team in their league battle.

=== Aberdeen ===
The powerfully-built forward signed for Aberdeen in 1992 for £500,000, aged 29. After scoring twice on his debut he became popular with the fans and was nicknamed 'Deadly Dunc' for his strike-rate. He formed successful partnerships with other strikers such as Eoin Jess, Scott Booth and Billy Dodds during his time at Pittodrie.

In November 1995, Shearer won the Scottish League Cup with the club, scoring the second goal in the 2–0 win over Dundee at Hampden Park. He had also appeared in the 1992 Scottish League Cup Final and the 1993 Scottish Cup Final, when the Dons were beaten 2–1 by Rangers on both occasions, and featured heavily in League campaigns in 1993 and 1994 which ended with runners-up finishes, again behind Rangers. Shearer made 152 league appearances for Aberdeen, scoring 55 goals.

=== Inverness CT ===
In 1997, at the age of 35, he returned to his native Highlands to join Inverness Caledonian Thistle, where he played for two and a half seasons, making 55 league appearances and scoring 17 goals.

== International career ==
During his time at Aberdeen, Shearer was capped seven times for Scotland between 1994 and 1995, scoring two goals including an important opening strike in an away win over Finland which helped the national side qualify for Euro 96, although Shearer did not make the squad for that tournament.

The senior team was his first experience of international football, having never played at any age-group level. He achieved a childhood ambition when he played in the national team alongside John McGinlay, a childhood friend also from Fort William.

== Managerial career ==
In season 1999–00 he began to concentrate more on coaching than playing, and was in the dugout when Caley Thistle famously beat Celtic 3–1 in the Scottish Cup. In 2000, he became assistant to then Inverness Caley Thistle manager Steve Paterson, following the departure of former assistant manager Alex Caldwell to Elgin City. He continued to be registered as a player (though seldom appeared in the squad) until the end of the 2001–02 season.

In December 2002 both Paterson and Shearer left Inverness to take up management roles at Aberdeen. However, this did not prove to be a happy return to Pittodrie for Shearer, as Aberdeen struggled in the SPL and were put out of the Scottish Cup at the fourth-round stage by Livingston. Steve Paterson and Duncan Shearer left the club in 2004.

Shearer was appointed as manager of Highland League side Buckie Thistle in October 2004. During his reign as manager, he won the Aberdeenshire Cup twice and the Aberdeenshire Shield once. He was sacked in April 2008, after a disappointing home defeat to Cove Rangers effectively ended Buckie's hopes of winning the Highland League championship.

He then became a youth coach at Inverness Caledonian Thistle. Shearer and fellow coach, Scott Kellacher, were put in temporary charge of the first-team after manager Terry Butcher moved to Hibernian in November 2013.

He released his autobiography in 2011.

== Career statistics ==
=== Club ===
Appearances and goals by club, season and competition
Club	Season	League			National cup		League cup		Europe		Total	
Club	Season	Division	Apps	Goals	Apps	Goals	Apps	Goals	Apps	Goals	Apps	Goals
Chelsea	1983–84	Second Division	0	0	0	0	0	0	–		0	0
Chelsea	1984–85	First Division	0	0	0	0	0	0	0	0	0	0
Chelsea	1985–86	First Division	2	1	0	0	0	0	0	0	2	1
Chelsea	Total		2	1	0	0	0	0	0	0	2	1
Huddersfield Town	1985–86	Second Division	8	7	0	0	0	0	–		8	7
Huddersfield Town	1986–87	Second Division	42	21	2	1	4	2	–		48	24
Huddersfield Town	1987–88	Second Division	33	10	3	2	2	4	–		38	16
Huddersfield Town	Total		83	38	5	3	6	6	0	0	94	47
Swindon Town	1988–89	Second Division	38	14	2	1	2	1	–		42	16
Swindon Town	1989–90	Second Division	45	21	1	1	8	4	–		54	26
Swindon Town	1990–91	Second Division	44	22	3	1	3	0	–		50	23
Swindon Town	1991–92	Second Division	37	22	3	4	6	6	–		46	32
Swindon Town	Total		164	79	9	7	19	11	0	0	192	97
Blackburn Rovers	1991–92	Second Division	6	1	0	0	0	0	–		6	1
Aberdeen	1992–93	Scottish Premier Division	34	21	4	1	5	5	0	0	43	27
Aberdeen	1993–94	Scottish Premier Division	43	17	6	4	3	4	2	1	54	26
Aberdeen	1994–95	Scottish Premier Division	25	9	2	0	2	4	2	0	31	13
Aberdeen	1995–96	Scottish Premier Division	30	3	4	3	2	1	0	0	36	7
Aberdeen	1996–97	Scottish Premier Division	20	4	2	0	3	0	5	1	30	5
Aberdeen	Total		152	54	18	8	15	14	9	2	194	78
Inverness Caledonian	1997–98	Scottish Second Division	24	5	4	1	0	0	–		28	6
Inverness Caledonian	1998–99	Scottish Second Division	30	12	1	0	2	1	–		33	13
Inverness Caledonian	1999–2000	Scottish First Division	1	0	0	0	0	0	–		1	0
Inverness Caledonian	Total		55	17	5	1	2	1	0	0	62	19
Career total			462	190	37	19	42	32	9	2	550	243

=== International ===
Appearances and goals by national team and year
National team	Year	Apps	Goals
Scotland	1994	3	2
Scotland	1995	4	0
Total		7	2

Scores and results list Scotland's goal tally first, score column indicates score after each Shearer goal

List of international goals scored by Duncan Shearer
No.	Date	Venue	Opponent	Score	Result	Competition
1	27 May 1994	Nieuw Galgenwaard, Utrecht, Netherlands	Netherlands	1–3	1–3	Friendly match
2	7 September 1994	Olympiastadion, Helsinki, Finland	Finland	1–0	2–0	UEFA Euro 1996 Qualifier

== Honours ==
Aberdeen

- Scottish League Cup: 1995–96

Buckie Thistle

- Aberdeenshire Cup: 2004–05, 2007–08
- Aberdeenshire Shield: 2007–08

Individual

- PFA Team of the Year: 1991–92 Second Division
