= Ian Liversedge =

English footballer and physiotherapist

Ian Liversedge is a sports physiotherapist and former professional footballer.

== Career ==
=== As a player ===
He played for Everton and Blackpool.

=== As a physiotherapist ===
Huddersfield Town appointed him as their physiotherapist on 4 July 2008, after four years with Accrington Stanley, replacing Lee Brendan Martin. He left the club after the dismissal of Stan Ternent.

Liversedge started his physiotherapy career at Newcastle United. He subsequently worked at Oldham Athletic, Manchester United, Stoke City, Altrincham and Burnley where he spent five years with Stan Ternent. Whilst at Burnley he was given the sobriquet 'Sos'. He has also worked at the Beaumont Hospital in Bolton.

He joined Accrington Stanley in June 2004, then in the Conference, with a brief to "establish the medical side of the operation ... virtually from scratch". When he left, Chief Executive Robert Heys said "Ian played an important role in our promotion back to the Football League in 2006".

Liversedge moved to Macclesfield Town in January 2014.

== Radio broadcast ==
Liversedge took part in the BBC Radio 4 programme "Kicking Off The Dream", which looked behind the scenes at Oldham Athletic, on 4 January 1990.

== Disciplinary matters ==
The FA Regulatory Commission fined Liversedge £100 and warned him as to future conduct, on 4 October 2007, for a breach of FA Rule E3 - Improper conduct. This arose from an incident at the Accrington Stanley v Peterborough United League Two match on 1 September 2007. He was charged again, for using bad language during the Accrington Stanley v Milton Keynes Dons game on 24 March 2008.
