= Ian McInerney =

English footballer

Personal information
- Full name: Ian Dominic McInerney
- Date of birth: 26 January 1964 (age 62)
- Place of birth: Liverpool, England
- Position: Striker

Senior career*
Years	Team	Apps	(Gls)
- Newcastle Blue Star
1988–1989	Huddersfield Town	10	(1)
1989–1991	Stockport County	42	(8)
1990	→ Rochdale (loan)	4	(1)
1991	Morecambe		
1992-1996	Runcorn		
1996-1997	Halifax Town		
1997	Leigh RMI		
- * Club domestic league appearances and goals

Ian Dominic McInerney (born 26 January 1964) is a former professional footballer, who played for Newcastle Blue Star, Huddersfield Town, Stockport County, Rochdale (loan), Morecambe, Runcorn, Halifax Town and Leigh RMI.
