= Vince Chapman =

English footballer (born 1967)

Personal information
- Full name: Vincent John Chapman
- Date of birth: 5 December 1967 (age 58)
- Place of birth: Newcastle upon Tyne, England
- Position: Defender

Youth career
- Wallsend Boys Club

Senior career*
Years	Team	Apps	(Gls)
1985–1987	Tow Law Town		
1987–1988	Huddersfield Town	6	(0)
1988–1991	Rochdale	24	(1)
- * Club domestic league appearances and goals

Vincent John Chapman (born 5 December 1967) is a former professional footballer who played as a defender in the Football League for Huddersfield Town and Rochdale after starting his career at Wallsend Boys Club and then Tow Law Town.
