= Phil Quinlan =

English footballer

Personal information
- Full name: Philip Edward Quinlan
- Date of birth: 17 April 1971 (age 55)
- Place of birth: Madrid, Spain
- Position: Midfielder

Senior career*
Years	Team	Apps	(Gls)
1989–1991	Everton	2	(0)
1991	→ Huddersfield Town (loan)	10	(2)
1992–1993	Southport FC	24	(8)
- * Club domestic league appearances and goals

Philip Edward Quinlan (born 17 April 1971 in Madrid) is a former professional footballer, who played as a midfielder and striker for Huddersfield Town, Everton, and Southport FC.
