= Gordon Tucker (footballer) =

English footballer

Personal information
- Date of birth: 5 January 1968 (age 58)
- Place of birth: Manchester, England
- Position: Defender

Senior career*
Years	Team	Apps	(Gls)
- Derby County
1987–1989	Huddersfield Town	35	(0)
1989–1990	Scunthorpe United	15	(1)
1990–1994	Goole Town		
1994–1995	Hyde United	26	(3)
1998	Hyde United	11	(0)
- * Club domestic league appearances and goals

Gordon Tucker (born 5 January 1968) is an English former professional footballer, who played for Derby County, Huddersfield Town, Scunthorpe United, Hyde United and Goole Town.

== Playing career ==
Gordon Tucker started his career at Derby County on non-contract terms, he then moved to Huddersfield Town in 1987. He made his debut against Plymouth Argyle in a 6–1 defeat, he was wearing the number 6 shirt. He was to make a further 21 starts and 6 sub appearances in Town's worst ever season, the 1987–88 season. He was to make 35 appearances over two years at Leeds Road under Malcolm Macdonald and Eoin Hand, his last game in Town's colours was against Bolton Wanderers on 1 May 1989, Town lost 3–1, he was wearing the number 5 shirt. He was to leave in 1989 for Scunthorpe United. He was to play 15 games at Glanford Park before moving to Goole in 1990. His appearance data at Goole is unknown but he moved to Hyde United in the summer of 1994. Tucker was to play 42 games in all competitions in the 1994–95 season. He did return to play for Hyde in February 1998. He came on as a substitute in a game against Emley at The Welfare Ground, he was to then come on again as a substitute in the next game against Boston United. He then made another 9 starts, then was an unused substitute for the next three games, then his last appearance was as a substitute against Runcorn, it was also the last game of the 1997–98 season. However, he failed to live up to his first spell as a Hyde player. He left Hyde at the end of the season.
