= Carl Madrick =

English footballer

Personal information
- Full name: Carl James Madrick
- Date of birth: 20 September 1968 (age 58)
- Place of birth: Bolton, England
- Position: Midfielder

Senior career*
| Years | Team | Apps | (Gls) |
| 1987–1988 | Huddersfield Town | 8 | (1) |
| 1988–1989 | Peterborough United | 8 | (0) |
- Chorley
- * Club domestic league appearances and goals

Carl James Madrick (born 20 September 1968) is a former professional footballer, who played for Huddersfield Town, Peterborough United and Chorley.
