= Keith Edwards (footballer, born 1957) =

English footballer

Personal information
- Full name: Keith Edwards
- Date of birth: 16 July 1957 (age 69)
- Place of birth: Stockton-on-Tees, England
- Height: 5 ft 8 in (1.73 m)
- Position: Striker

Senior career*
| Years | Team | Apps | (Gls) |
| 1974 | Wolverhampton Wanderers | 0 | (0) |
| 1975–1978 | Sheffield United | 70 | (29) |
| 1978–1981 | Hull City | 132 | (57) |
| 1981–1986 | Sheffield United | 191 | (114) |
| 1986–1987 | Leeds United | 38 | (6) |
| 1987–1988 | Aberdeen | 9 | (2) |
| 1988–1989 | Hull City | 55 | (29) |
| 1989–1990 | Stockport County | 27 | (10) |
| 1990 | → Huddersfield Town (loan) | 10 | (4) |
| 1990–1991 | Huddersfield Town | 18 | (4) |
| 1990 | → Plymouth Argyle (loan) | 3 | (1) |
| Total | | 553 | (256) |
- * Club domestic league appearances and goals

Keith Edwards (born 16 July 1957) is an English former professional footballer who spent the majority of his career between Hull City and Sheffield United, playing as a striker.

== Career ==
Edwards started his early career as a youth player with Leyton Orient, as his father was an Orient supporter. He soon became homesick and went back north to join Sheffield United.

A prolific goalscorer, he had two spells (1975–1978 and 1981–1986) with the Blades, for whom he scored 171 goals in 293 appearances. Whilst there, he was the highest scoring player in their division twice, scoring 36 goals (one for Hull City) in Division 4 in 1981–82 and 33 goals in Division 3 in 1983–84. The latter haul earned Edwards his second Adidas Golden Boot award.

His debut for United came in a FA Cup Third Round tie against Leicester City on 3 January 1976 and his league debut followed the next month, on 28 February, in a Division 1 game against Queens Park Rangers. However, his first goal didn't arrive until the start of the next season in a Division 2 fixture against Wolverhampton Wanderers on 24 August.

In between his time at Bramall Lane, he played for Hull City who paid £50,000 for Edwards in 1978. Ian Porterfield bought him back for £100,000 and played him for the first time against Scunthorpe United on 26 September 1981, the 1–0 home victory being the first of a 17-game unbeaten run. Edwards scored his first two goals under Porterfield in a 4–0 win over Crewe Alexandra three days later.

He formed an impressive partnership with Bob Hatton, feeding off the distribution of Colin Morris as United ended the season with 19 games without defeat to win the Fourth Division Championship, his 35 goals being a post-war record.

His final appearance for United came in a pre-season friendly at Bramall Lane against Spanish club Sevilla FC on 1 August 1986. He began the 1986–87 season at Leeds United after a transfer fee of £125,000 but only managed 9 goals in 51 appearances, although one of those was against Coventry City in the FA Cup semi-final at Hillsborough in 1987. Despite his efforts, Leeds lost the game 3–2. They also missed out on promotion to the First Division weeks later, losing the relegation/promotion playoff final to Charlton Athletic in a replay.

Aberdeen secured his services later in 1987 and he returned to Hull City in 1988. He later played for Stockport County, Huddersfield Town and finished his career at Plymouth Argyle in 1990. He is one of the select band of players to have scored over 250 league goals in English football, although almost all of his career was spent outside the top flight.

In recent years, Keith has worked for BBC Radio Sheffield commentating on matches involving one of his former clubs, Sheffield United.

== Honours ==
Sheffield United

- Football League Fourth Division: 1981–82
