= Ian Bray =

Welsh footballer (born 1962)

Personal information
- Full name: Ian Michael Bray
- Date of birth: 6 December 1962 (age 63)
- Place of birth: Neath, Wales
- Height: 5 ft 8 in (1.73 m)
- Position: Defender

Senior career*
Years	Team	Apps	(Gls)
1981–1985	Hereford United	108	(4)
1985–1990	Huddersfield Town	89	(1)
1990–1992	Burnley	17	(0)
- * Club domestic league appearances and goals

Ian Michael Bray (born 6 December 1962) is a Welsh former professional footballer who played as a full-back. During his career, he played for Hereford United, Huddersfield Town and Burnley and made more than 200 appearances in the Football League.

== Playing career ==
Born in Neath, in southern Wales, Bray started his career as an apprentice at Football League Fourth Division side Hereford United before signing his first professional contract with the club in December 1980. He made his senior debut at the beginning of the 1981–82 season and in his first five matches he scored two goals. During the same campaign he had a loan spell at New Zealand club Stop Out. Bray became a first-team regular for Hereford over the following four seasons, making 108 league appearances and scoring four goals during his time at Edgar Street.

Ahead of the 1985–86 campaign, Bray left Hereford to join Second Division club Huddersfield Town on a free transfer. He went on to play 89 league games for the side, scoring once, but was injured during the 1987–88 season as Huddersfield were relegated to the Third Division. The injury caused him to miss the whole of the next season and he was subsequently released from his contract in the summer of 1990.

Following his release by Huddersfield, Bray returned to the Fourth Division with Burnley, who were managed by Frank Casper. He made his league debut for the club alongside fellow new signing Paul France in the opening match of the 1990–91 campaign, a 2–2 draw against Lincoln City at Turf Moor. Bray kept his place for several matches before being dropped in favour of Ray Deakin, but regained the left-back berth towards the end of the season when the latter was unavailable through injury. He went on to make ten appearances during the following campaign, six of them in the league, before again being dropped for Joe Jakub. Bray played his final match for Burnley on 19 October 1991 in the 2–0 home win over Walsall. Following the arrival of new manager Jimmy Mullen, Bray did not play again for the club; he was released in April 1992 and subsequently retired from professional football.

== After retirement ==
As of November 2011, Bray was a coach at junior football club Scholes United in Huddersfield.
