= Mark Smith (footballer, born December 1961) =

English footballer (born December 1961)

Personal information
- Full name: Mark Cyril Smith
- Date of birth: 19 December 1961 (age 64)
- Place of birth: Sheffield, England
- Height: 5 ft 10 in (1.78 m)
- Position: Winger

Senior career*
| Years | Team | Apps | (Gls) |
| 1980–1982 | Sheffield United | 0 | (0) |
| ? | Worksop Town | | |
| 1982–1985 | Gainsborough Trinity | | |
| 1985–1986 | Scunthorpe United | 1 | (0) |
| 1986–1988 | Kettering Town | | |
| 1988–1989 | Rochdale | 27 | (7) |
| 1989–1991 | Huddersfield Town | 96 | (11) |
| 1991–1993 | Grimsby Town | 77 | (4) |
| 1993–1995 | Scunthorpe United | 62 | (8) |
- Boston United
- Gainsborough Trinity
- Matlock Town
- Sheffield
- Hallam
- Maltby Main

Managerial career
- –2002: Buxton
- 2002: Maltby Main
- * Club domestic league appearances and goals

Mark Cyril Smith (born 19 December 1961) is an English former footballer and manager.

== Career ==
Smith played for Sheffield United, Worksop Town, Gainsborough Trinity, Scunthorpe United, Kettering Town, Rochdale, Huddersfield Town, Grimsby Town, Scunthorpe again, Boston United, Gainsborough again, Matlock Town, Sheffield, Hallam and Maltby Main.

He became manager of Buxton in the Northern Counties East Football League Premier Division during the 1999–2000 season. He resigned in April 2002. He was appointed as Maltby Main manager in July.
