= Julian Winter =

English footballer (born 1965)

Personal information
- Date of birth: 6 September 1965 (age 61)
- Place of birth: Huddersfield, England
- Height: 6 ft 0 in (1.83 m)
- Position: Defender

Senior career*
Years	Team	Apps	(Gls)
1984–1989	Huddersfield Town	93	(5)
1988–1989	→ Scunthorpe United (loan)	4	(0)
1989–1990	Sheffield United	0	(0)
- * Club domestic league appearances and goals

Julian Winter (born 6 September 1965) is a former football player and administrator who was the chief executive of Swansea City football club. Born in Huddersfield, he played as a defender for his home-town club Huddersfield Town and Scunthorpe United, as well as being on the books of Sheffield United. Since retiring from playing, Winter has acted as an executive for Grimsby Town, Watford, Sheffield United, Huddersfield Town, and Swansea City.

== Playing career ==
Winter is a former professional footballer, who played for Huddersfield Town, Scunthorpe United and Sheffield United. Winter was signed for United by Dave Bassett for the 1989–90 season, but he sustained career-ending ligament damage just a week before the season started. After 10 operations in four years, he finally retired from the game.

== Football Administration ==
After his retirement, Winter graduated from Sheffield Hallam University with a degree and returned to football, working for Grimsby Town before moving to Watford and serving as community director and then deputy C.E.O.

In December 2008, Winter was appointed Chief Executive Officer of Watford following the resignation of Mark Ashton. He subsequently left his post in June 2011 and joined Sheffield United the following September as Chief Executive. After a year in the post Winter left the Blades in September 2012, only to return to the role less than a year later. After new owners purchased 50 per cent of United, Winter left his post for the second time in December 2013.

Winter became chief executive of Huddersfield Town in 2016 before departing in 2020. He was appointed chairman and chief executive of Swansea City in September 2020.
