= Chris Hutchings =

English footballer & manager

Personal information
- Full name: Christopher Hutchings
- Date of birth: 5 July 1957 (age 69)
- Place of birth: Winchester, England
- Height: 5 ft 10 in (1.78 m)
- Position: Defender

Youth career
- Harrow Borough

Senior career*
Years	Team	Apps	(Gls)
1980–1983	Chelsea	87	(3)
1983–1987	Brighton & Hove Albion	153	(4)
1987–1990	Huddersfield Town	110	(10)
1990–1991	Walsall	40	(0)
1991–1994	Rotherham United	78	(4)
Total		468	(21)

Managerial career
- 2000: Bradford City
- 2007: Wigan Athletic
- 2008–2009: Derby County (caretaker)
- 2009–2011: Walsall
- 2012: Ipswich Town (caretaker)
- * Club domestic league appearances and goals

Christopher Hutchings (born 5 July 1957) is an English former footballer and manager. He played for a number of clubs, including Chelsea and played more than 100 games for Brighton & Hove Albion and Huddersfield Town. He has managed in the Premier League with Bradford City and Wigan Athletic, while his most recent tenure was at Walsall. He left Ipswich Town in November 2012 following Paul Jewell's departure.

== Playing career ==
As a player, Hutchings spent time at Harrow Borough, Chelsea, Brighton & Hove Albion, Huddersfield Town, Walsall and Rotherham United. He made a total of 468 senior league appearances.

Chris Hutchings was a part-time player (and former bricklayer) with Harrow Borough. Chelsea signed him in July 1980 for £5,000. He made his debut in October 1980 against Cardiff City, playing midfield, and scored the winning goal after just 15 mins. He converted to full-back, where his best assets were his aggressive approach and his speed. Chelsea transferred him to Brighton and Hove Albion for £50,000 in November 1983.

== Management career ==
=== Bradford City ===
His first coaching role came at Rotherham, where he was youth team coach. He moved to Bradford City as assistant manager under Chris Kamara and continued in the role under Paul Jewell. In his time at Bradford, the club was promoted from the Second Division to the Premier League.

Hutchings took charge as Bradford's manager during the 2000–01 season after Jewell moved to Sheffield Wednesday. He took Bradford to the semi-finals of the Intertoto Cup and won the club's first Premier League home game of the season with a 2–0 win over Chelsea. However, he lasted a total of only 21 competitive games, and his win against Chelsea was the only one in 12 Premier League games, before being sacked on 6 November 2000.

=== Wigan Athletic ===
Hutchings linked up again with Jewell as assistant manager now at Wigan Athletic in 2001. In May 2007, he succeeded Jewell as manager for a second time. Wigan made an impressive start to the season, going top for a short period in August. However, after six consecutive defeats Wigan sacked Hutchings on 5 November 2007 after the club dropped into the Premier League relegation zone after just 12 Premiership games – almost seven years to the day he was sacked at Bradford. His last game in charge was a 2–0 home defeat to Chelsea.

=== Derby County ===
He joined Bury on a voluntary basis in January 2008 to assist caretaker manager Chris Brass, but left on 24 April 2008 to link up with Paul Jewell for a third time, this time as his assistant with Derby County. When Jewell resigned as Derby manager in December 2008 after a 1–0 defeat left them 18th in the Championship table, Hutchings was once again appointed caretaker manager. Hutchings's only match in charge of Derby was an FA Cup third round tie away at Forest Green Rovers, which Derby won 4–3 despite being behind 2–0 and 3–2 during the match, before Derby appointed Nigel Clough, son of former Derby manager Brian Clough, as their new manager. Hutchings immediately left the club.

=== Walsall ===
On 20 January 2009, he was named manager of League One club Walsall with Martin O'Connor as his assistant taking over from Jimmy Mullen, who had been sacked earlier in the month. The side were 13th in the table.

Hutchings's started his Walsall career with a 1–1 home league draw with Hereford United. On 4 January 2011, Hutchings was sacked as manager of Walsall along with assistant manager Martin O'Connor.

=== Ipswich Town ===
Hutchings was named as Jewell's assistant at Ipswich Town on 17 January 2011. Hutchings was named Ipswich Town caretaker manager after Paul Jewell left the club in October 2012.

=== Subsequent clubs ===
In July 2013, Hutchings was named as assistant manager to Lee Ebden at Northern Premier League Division One South side Market Drayton Town. He left the club on 8 November 2013.

He became a coach at Shrewsbury Town in February 2014, leaving in March 2014 to join Barnsley, where he worked until February 2015.

== Personal life ==
Outside football, Hutchings has also worked as a bricklayer and a second-hand car salesman.
