= Chris Marsden =

English footballer (born 1969)

Personal information
- Full name: Christopher Marsden
- Date of birth: 3 January 1969 (age 57)
- Place of birth: Sheffield, England
- Height: 5 ft 11 in (1.80 m)
- Position: Midfielder

Senior career*
Years	Team	Apps	(Gls)
1987–1988	Sheffield United	16	(1)
1988–1994	Huddersfield Town	121	(9)
1993–1994	→ Coventry City (loan)	7	(0)
1994	Wolverhampton Wanderers	8	(0)
1994–1996	Notts County	10	(0)
1996–1997	Stockport County	66	(3)
1997–1999	Birmingham City	52	(3)
1999–2004	Southampton	129	(6)
2004	Busan I'Park	2	(1)
2004–2005	Sheffield Wednesday	15	(0)
Total		426	(23)
- * Club domestic league appearances and goals

Christopher Marsden (born 3 January 1969) is an English former footballer who played in the Football League and Premier League for Sheffield United, Huddersfield Town, Coventry City, Wolverhampton Wanderers, Notts County, Stockport County, Birmingham City, Southampton and Sheffield Wednesday, and in the Korean K-League for Busan I'Park. He led Southampton to the 2003 FA Cup Final, which they lost 1–0 to Arsenal.

== Playing career ==
Marsden was born in Sheffield and started his career with Sheffield United, going on to play for Huddersfield Town, Coventry City, Wolves, Notts County, Stockport County, Birmingham City, Southampton and Busan I'Park in South Korea.

He ended his career playing for Football League One club Sheffield Wednesday.

Marsden made 424 appearances in the Football League and scored 22 goals as a left footed midfield player and occasional defender. He first made an impression with Huddersfield Town in the early 1990s before successful spells at Stockport County and Birmingham City.

=== Southampton ===
Marsden played seven games in the Premiership for Coventry City in 1993/94 but did not play in the top flight again for a further six years (by which time he was 30) when he was brought to Southampton by then manager Dave Jones.

He captained Southampton in the 2003 FA Cup Final, which they lost 1–0 to Arsenal.

=== Sheffield Wednesday ===
After a short and unsuccessful spell at Busan I'Park, Marsden was snapped up on a free transfer by Chris Turner for Sheffield Wednesday. However, his career was cut short by a hamstring injury that forced him to retire.

== Honours ==
Stockport County

- Football League Second Division runner-up: 1996–97

Southampton

- FA Cup runner-up: 2002–03

Individual

- PFA Team of the Year: 1991–92 Third Division, 1996–97 Second Division
