= Steve Hardwick =

English footballer (1956–2024)

Personal information
- Full name: Steven Hardwick
- Date of birth: 6 September 1956
- Place of birth: Mansfield, England
- Date of death: 16 September 2024 (aged 68)
- Height: 5 ft 11 in (1.80 m)
- Position: Goalkeeper

Senior career*
Years	Team	Apps	(Gls)
1974–1977	Chesterfield	38	(0)
1977–1983	Newcastle United	92	(0)
1978	→ Detroit Express (loan)	30	(0)
1983–1988	Oxford United	156	(0)
1985	→ Crystal Palace (loan)	3	(0)
1987	→ Sunderland (loan)	6	(0)
1988–1991	Huddersfield Town	109	(0)
Total		434	(0)

International career
1974	England Youth	3	(0)
- * Club domestic league appearances and goals

Steven Hardwick (6 September 1956 – 16 September 2024) was an English professional footballer who played as a goalkeeper for six professional teams during the 1970s, 1980s and 1990s. Hardwick died on 16 September 2024, at the age of 68.

== Honours ==
Oxford United

- Football League Third Division: 1983–84
