= Paul France =

English footballer

Personal information
- Full name: Michael Paul France
- Date of birth: 10 September 1968 (age 58)
- Place of birth: Huddersfield, England
- Position: Defender

Team information
- Current team: Huddersfield Town (Football in the Community Officer)

Youth career
- Huddersfield Town

Senior career*
Years	Team	Apps	(Gls)
1987–1989	Huddersfield Town	11	(0)
1988	Cobh Ramblers	4	(0)
1989–1990	Bristol City	0	(0)
1990–1992	Burnley	8	(0)
1992–1999	Altrincham	241	(27)
1998–1999	Stalybridge Celtic	22	(2)
- Ashton United
- * Club domestic league appearances and goals

Michael Paul France (born 10 September 1968 in Huddersfield, West Yorkshire) is a former professional footballer who played as a defender for Huddersfield Town.

While at Huddersfield he was sent on loan to Cobh Ramblers in November 1988 .

Following short stays at Bristol City and Burnley he moved into non-league football.

He was Altrincham's player of the year in his first season, and went on to combine playing for the club with positions as Football in the Community Officer at first Leeds United and then Huddersfield Town.

He left Altrincham in 1999, having played over 300 games for the club, and signed for Stalybridge Celtic. He later joined Ashton United, but had left by November 2001.

After football, he was Football in the Community Officer at Huddersfield Town and manager of the Sporting Pride Community Trust, based in Huddersfield. He is currently Deputy Chief Executive at Burnley FC in the Community.
