= Peter Ward (footballer, born 1964) =

English footballer

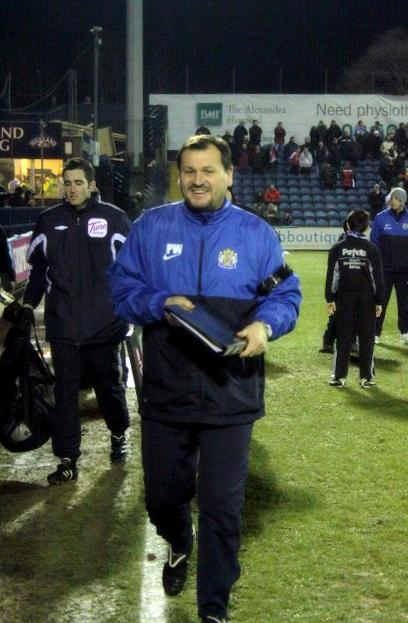

Personal information
- Full name: Peter Ward
- Date of birth: 15 October 1964 (age 62)
- Place of birth: Chester le Street, County Durham, England
- Height: 6 ft 0 in (1.83 m)
- Position: Midfielder

Senior career*
Years	Team	Apps	(Gls)
1982–1985	Chester-le-Street Town		
1985–1985	Newcastle United	0	(0)
1985–1986	Chester-le-Street Town		
1986–1989	Huddersfield Town	37	(2)
1989–1991	Rochdale	84	(10)
1991–1995	Stockport County	142	(10)
1995–1999	Wrexham	120	(14)
1999	Morecambe	1	(0)

Managerial career
- 2011: Stockport County
- * Club domestic league appearances and goals

Peter Ward (born 15 October 1964) is an English professional football manager who played over 350 Football League games as a midfielder. He was a player, manager, assistant manager and coach at Stockport County.

== Playing career ==
Ward played for Chester le Street, Newcastle United, Huddersfield Town, Rochdale, Stockport County, Wrexham and Morecambe. He started his career with the local Chester le Street town side and was spotted whilst playing in the Northern League by Jack Charlton at Newcastle United. However, following Jack Charlton's departure he was released by the St James' Park club and he returned to play for Chester-Le-Street Town. The following year he was given another opportunity when he was subsequently transferred to Huddersfield Town. Following a successful spell at the Yorkshire side where he featured alongside players such as Duncan Shearer he left for Spotland.

At Rochdale he helped the side into the 5th round of the FA Cup where they were defeated by Crystal Palace at Selhurst Park, in what was the club's most successful ever run in the competition. On the way Rochdale defeated Whitley Bay from Ward's home region of the North East. His most successful spell in his professional career came when he moved onto Edgeley Park, playing under the legendary Uruguayan Manager, Danny Bergara, for Stockport County and this is where he met Jim Gannon. During his time at Stockport he played at Wembley four times, however he lost on each occasion. Ward was also renowned for his set pieces and his tough tackling. Ward then saw out his professional career with Welsh side Wrexham with whom he helped reach the FA Cup quarter-finals in 1997, and played in the side that missed out on reaching the League One play-off's on goal difference in 1997/98. Ward retired from playing in the summer of 1999, but he was persuaded out of retirement to make one appearance for Football Conference side Morecambe in a 1–2 home defeat by Kingstonian in October 1999.

== Coaching career ==
Following Ward's playing career being terminated due to a persistent injury, he took up coaching at Stockport County's Centre of Excellence, but following County's 6–0 loss to Macclesfield Town on 26 December 2005, Manager Chris Turner was sacked. Ward's former teammate Jim Gannon was appointed as manager, and Ward was promoted to his assistant at Edgeley Park. During this spell, Gannon & Ward led County from 24th in League Two up to 5th in League One by Christmas 2008. Overseeing one of the most successful periods in the club's history, including a Football League record of nine consecutive wins without conceding a goal between January–March 2007 and winning the Football League Two Playoffs in 2008. Gannon, Ward & much of the backroom staff were made redundant in May 2009, due to County entering administration. On 30 June 2009 he was appointed as Gannon's assistant at Motherwell. The tenure was short-lived, however, and they were both out of work by Christmas. Following the takeover of Stockport County by the 2015 consortium in June 2010, Ward took up the offer to take charge of first team training of his former club during the close season whilst the new board searched for a permanent manager. After the dismissal of their appointee, Paul Simpson, Ward was temporarily placed in charge of first team affairs as caretaker manager

Following Gannon's appointment at League Two rivals Port Vale, Ward was thought to be favourite to get the Stockport job permanently. His first game in charge was a 5–1 home defeat by Gillingham. In his second match, however, a much improved performance resulted in a 3–3 draw against second-placed Rotherham United, with County at one point 3–1 ahead. He was replaced by Ray Mathias (also employed as caretaker manager) on 9 March 2011 but joined the coaching staff. He left Stockport in July 2011.

== Honours ==
Stockport County

- Associate Members' Cup / Football League Trophy runner-up: 1991–92, 1992–93
