= Lee Martin (footballer, born September 1968) =

English footballer

Personal information
- Full name: Lee Brendan Martin
- Date of birth: 9 September 1968 (age 58)
- Place of birth: Huddersfield, England
- Position: Goalkeeper

Youth career
- Huddersfield Town

Senior career*
Years	Team	Apps	(Gls)
1987–1992	Huddersfield Town	54	(0)
1992–1997	Blackpool	98	(0)
1996	→ Bradford City (loan)	0	(0)
1997	Rochdale	0	(0)
1997–1999	Halifax Town	37	(0)
1999–2003	Macclesfield Town	53	(0)
2003–2004	Huddersfield Town	0	(0)
Total		242	(0)
- * Club domestic league appearances and goals

Lee Brendan Martin (born 9 September 1968) is an English former professional footballer. He played as a goalkeeper for many teams in the north of England.

He graduated from the University of Salford's Physiotherapy degree in 2002 and was the physiotherapist at his home-town club, Huddersfield Town between 2003 and 2008. He left on 4 July 2008, "by mutual consent", to start up his own physiotherapy business. He was replaced at the Galpharm Stadium by the ex-Accrington Stanley physiotherapist Ian Liversedge.

He was appointed as Physiotherapist by Tranmere Rovers in 2010.
