= Simon Trevitt =

English footballer

Personal information
- Date of birth: 20 December 1967 (age 58)
- Place of birth: Dewsbury, England
- Height: 5 ft 11 in (1.80 m)
- Position: Defender

Senior career*
Years	Team	Apps	(Gls)
1986–1996	Huddersfield Town	229	(3)
1996–1998	Hull City	51	(1)
1997–1998	→ Swansea City (loan)	1	(0)
1998–?	Guiseley		
- * Club domestic league appearances and goals

Simon Trevitt (born 20 December 1967) is an English former professional footballer, who was born in Dewsbury, West Riding of Yorkshire, and played in the Football League as a defender for Huddersfield Town, Hull City and Swansea City.

He was listed as a Huddersfield Town fans' favourite in a 2006 survey. The survey was conducted by a Huddersfield Town supporters group and included up to 10,000 people.

He plays cricket for Liversedge Cricket club and previously managed the junior team of the village football club before retiring fully from the football.

== Honours ==
Huddersfield Town

- Football League Second Division play-offs: 1995
