= Graham Mitchell (English footballer) =

English footballer (born 1968)

Personal information
- Full name: Graham Lee Mitchell
- Date of birth: 16 February 1968 (age 58)
- Place of birth: Shipley, England
- Height: 6 ft 0 in (1.83 m)
- Position: Defender

Team information
- Current team: Huddersfield Town (Academy and U18s coach)

Youth career
- 1983–1986: Huddersfield Town

Senior career*
Years	Team	Apps	(Gls)
1986–1994	Huddersfield Town	244	(2)
1993	→ AFC Bournemouth (loan)	4	(0)
1994–1996	Bradford City	65	(1)
1996–1998	Raith Rovers	21	(0)
1997–1998	→ Cowdenbeath (loan)	11	(1)
1998–1999	Cardiff City	46	(0)
1999–2002	Halifax Town	131	(3)
2002–2003	Bradford Park Avenue	5	(3)
2003–2004	Farsley Celtic	5	(2)
Total		533	(12)

Managerial career
- 2008: Huddersfield Town (caretaker manager)
- * Club domestic league appearances and goals

Graham Lee Mitchell (born 16 February 1968) is an English former professional footballer, who played as a defender. In 2003, Mitchell played in a charity match at Huddersfield Town where The Wembley Wizards and The Town All Stars versed each other to raise money for Huddersfield Town, they were in administration at the time. He is highly regarded at his first club Huddersfield Town, where in 2006, he was named as one of their "100 Fans' Favourites". Mitchell made 533 league appearances and scored 12 goals between 1986 and 2004.

== Playing career ==
=== Huddersfield Town ===
Mitchell had played in defence, on the wing and even filled in as emergency striker for Town. Mitchell signed professional for Huddersfield Town in 1986, after spending two years in the Academy system. Mitchell spent a period on loan, in 1993, at AFC Bournemouth and played four games for them. After a few disagreements with then manager Neil Warnock, after playing 310 games and scoring 5 goals he was sold to Bradford City in 1994. He later returned in 2002 to take up coaching at the Huddersfield academy. And as of 2009 has held the roles of caretaker assistant manager, caretaker manager (in Gerry Murphy's absence), reserve team manager, U18s coach and was the head of academy, following Murphy's retirement. He left the latter role in November 2011 after reaching a mutual agreement with the club to end his contract seven months early.

=== Bradford City ===
Mitchell played for City between 1994 and 1996. During this spell Mitchell was a member of the 1995–96 play off promotion team. He moved to Raith Rovers on a free transfer in 1996. Mitchell played 79 games and scored one goal in all competitions for Bradford.

=== Raith Rovers ===
Mitchell played for Raith between 1996 and 1998; during this time he also had a spell on loan with Cowdenbeath. During his spell at Raith, Cardiff City showed interest in Mitchell and on 1 August 1998 he signed on a free transfer. He had played 23 games for Raith in all competitions. Mitchell also had a spell as captain at Raith.

=== Cardiff City ===
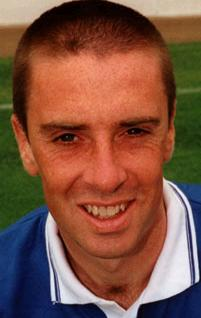
Graham Mitchell during his Cardiff days

Mitchell played for Cardiff between 1998 and 1999. It was also at this club when Mitchell started thinking about coaching as retirement loomed over him. After less than a year at the Welsh side, Mitchell was signed by Halifax Town for £45,000. Mitchell, an ever-present for the 1998–99 season, had clocked up 54 games for Cardiff.

=== Halifax Town ===
Mitchell spent three years at Halifax where he played 144 games and scored four goals in all competitions. During his three-year stint at Halifax, Mitchell began coaching at Huddersfield Town's academy. Mitchell had a spell as captain at Halifax and he wore the squad number 4. After retiring from professional football, Mitchell signed for non-league Bradford Park Avenue.

=== Non-League ===
Mitchell played at least eight games for Park Avenue and during this spell he scored 3 goals in a week, he scored 2 goals in the game against Barrow, more than he had ever scored in a whole season. He scored at least 4 goals.

In another one of these games he was sent-off for swearing at spectators while receiving treatment for a head injury and throwing his captain's armband at the referee didn't help his cause.

He was released in 2003 and signed for old teammate Lee Sinnott at Farsley Celtic. Mitchell played at least four games and scored at least 1 goal. He is thought to have left in 2004.

== Managerial career ==
=== Huddersfield Town Academy & caretaker manager ===
He joined Huddersfield Town once again in 2002 to coach one of the youth sides. In 2007, Gerry Murphy, John Dungworth, John Vaughan, Martyn Booty and Mitchell teamed together to coach the Huddersfield Town side in the aftermath of Peter Jackson's dismissal. A year later, when Andy Ritchie was dismissed, Gerry Murphy and Mitchell took over as caretaker manager and caretaker assistant manager respectively. At the end of the 2007–08 season, Stan Ternent was given the Town job; he was dismissed in November, when Murphy and Mitchell were placed in temporary charge once again. The team played six, won four and lost two. Mitchell took charge of the team, when Murphy was ill, against Southend United which Huddersfield won 1–0. Lee Clark took over the next day. Mitchell is coach for Huddersfield Town's under-18 youth squad. In February 2009, he took over as head of the academy following the retirement of Gerry Murphy.

=== Huddersfield Town Centenary Matchday ===
On Sunday 26 April 2009, a Centenary Matchday took place at The Galpharm Stadium which saw two teams, one managed by Andy Booth and the other managed by Mitchell, played each other full a full 90 minutes and have a penalty shootout. With both teams having a mix of fans, legends and staff Mitchell's team eventually beat Team Booth 12–11 on penalties after drawing 6–6 in normal time. Mitchell also took a penalty in the shootout.

=== Huddersfield Town Reserve Side ===
During Mitchell's spell as caretaker assistant manager at Huddersfield, he was in charge of the Terriers' second string up until Paul Stephenson took over in February 2009.

== Career statistics ==
Appearances and goals by club, season and competition
Club	Year(s)	League			FA Cup		League Cup		Other		Total	
Club	Year(s)	Division	Apps	Goals	Apps	Goals	Apps	Goals	Apps	Goals	Apps	Goals
Huddersfield Town	1986 to 1994	Football League	244	2	27	1	15	1	24	1	310	5
AFC Bournemouth (Loan)	1993	Football League	4	0	0	0	0	0	0	0	4	0
Bradford City	1994 to 1996	Football League	65	1	2	0	8	0	4	0	79	1
Raith Rovers	1996 to 1998	Scottish Premier League	21	0	0	0	1	0	1	0	23	0
Cowdenbeath (Loan)	1997 to 1998	Scottish League	11	1	0	0	0	0	0	0	11	1
Cardiff City	1998 to 1999	Football League	46	0	5	0	2	0	1	0	54	0
Halifax Town	1999 to 2002	Football League	131	3	6	1	4	0	3	0	144	4
Bradford (Park Avenue)	2002 to 2003	Northern Premier League	5	3	1	0	1	1	1	0	8	4
Farsley Celtic	2003 to 2004	Northern Premier League	5	2	0	0	0	0	0	0	5	2
Career total			534	13	28	1	30	1	33	1	624	16

== Managerial statistics ==
Team	From	To	Record				
Team	From	To	G	W	L	D	Win %
Huddersfield Town	13 December 2008	13 December 2008	1	1	0	0	100.00

Team	From	To	Record				
Team	From	To	G	W	L	D	Win %
Huddersfield Town Reserves	11 November 2008	9 February 2009	3	1	0	2	33.33

== Honours ==
=== Player ===
Huddersfield Town

- Football League Trophy runner-up: 1993–94
- Yorkshire Electricity Cup: 1994–95

Bradford City

- Football League Second Division play-offs: 1996

Cardiff City

- Football League Third Division third-place promotion: 1998–99

Farsley Celtic

- Northern Premier League Division One winners: 2003–04

Individual

- Huddersfield Town Player of the Year (Hargreaves Memorial Trophy): 1991–92
