= Eoin Hand =

Irish footballer and manager

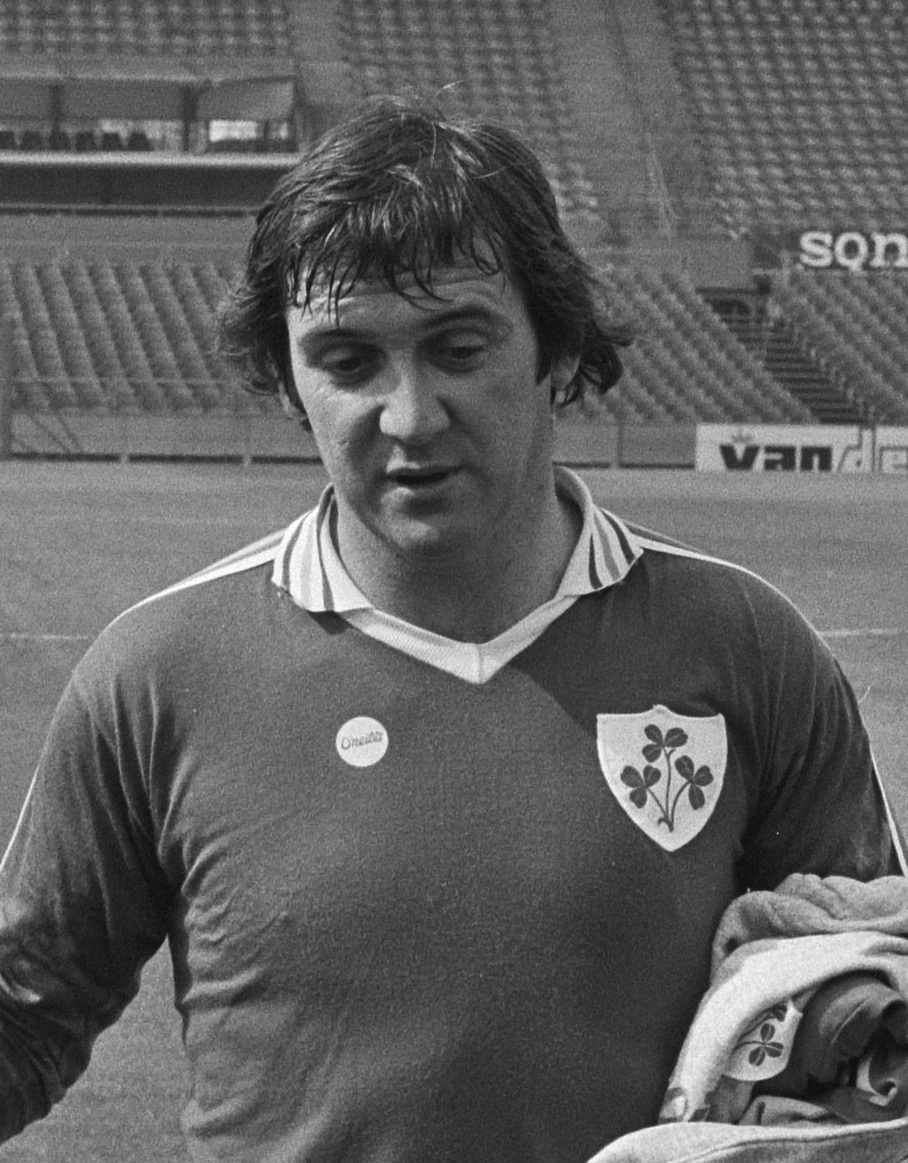
- Eoin Hand in 1981

Personal information
- Full name: Eoin Kevin Joseph Colin Hand
- Date of birth: 30 March 1946 (age 80)
- Place of birth: Dublin, Republic of Ireland
- Position: Defender

Youth career
- Stella Maris

Senior career*
Years	Team	Apps	(Gls)
1963–1964	Drumcondra	1	(0)
1964–1965	Swindon Town	0	(0)
1965–1966	Dundalk	2	(0)
1966	Shelbourne	0	(0)
1966–1968	Drumcondra	43	(13)
1968–1976	Portsmouth	260	(13)
1973	→ Port Elizabeth City (loan)		
1975	→ Lusitano (loan)		
1976	Arcadia Shepherds		
1977	Lusitano		
1977	Shamrock Rovers	9	(0)
1977–1979	Portsmouth	17	(2)
1979–1983	Limerick United	76	(24)

International career
1969–1975	Republic of Ireland	20	(2)
1979	League of Ireland XI	1	(0)

Managerial career
- 1979–1983: Limerick United
- 1980–1985: Republic of Ireland
- 1984–1985: St Patrick's Athletic
- 1987–1988: Al-Taawon
- 1988: Huddersfield Town (caretaker)
- 1988–1992: Huddersfield Town
- 1993: Amazulu
- 1993–1994: Shelbourne
- * Club domestic league appearances and goals

Eoin Kevin Joseph Colin Hand (born 30 March 1946) is an Irish former footballer and football manager. As a player, his normal position was centre-half. He works as a television and radio football commentator for RTÉ in Ireland.

== Playing career ==
Hand played schoolboy football with Stella Maris. As a 17-year-old, Hand was signed by Swindon Town but the move did not work out and he returned quickly to Ireland. He started his League of Ireland career with short spells for Dundalk and Shelbourne but it was with Drumcondra that he found most success.

After a series of outstanding displays, he was signed by Portsmouth F.C. for a transfer fee of £8,000 in October 1968. Hand impressed enough at Portsmouth to earn a call up to the Republic of Ireland national football team and went on to earn 19 caps for his country. He stayed with Portsmouth until being released at the end of the 1975–76 season. After a brief spell in South Africa, Hand was persuaded back into football by Shamrock Rovers making his debut on 9 October 1977 at Glenmalure Park. However, after only nine games he returned to Portsmouth F.C. He left again in 1979, after playing a total of 277 times in the league for them.

== Managerial career ==
In 1979, Hand was appointed player-manager of Limerick United. He immediately sparked a revival in Limerick's fortunes and they won the 1979–80 League of Ireland in Hand's first season. They landed a European Cup tie with Real Madrid and Hand was rewarded with the Irish national team manager's job. He was the 1980 Soccer Writers' Association of Ireland Personality of the Year. He also won the FAI Cup in 1982. For a short time, he tried to combine both jobs but with business commitments in Dublin, he left Limerick and concentrated on the Ireland job.

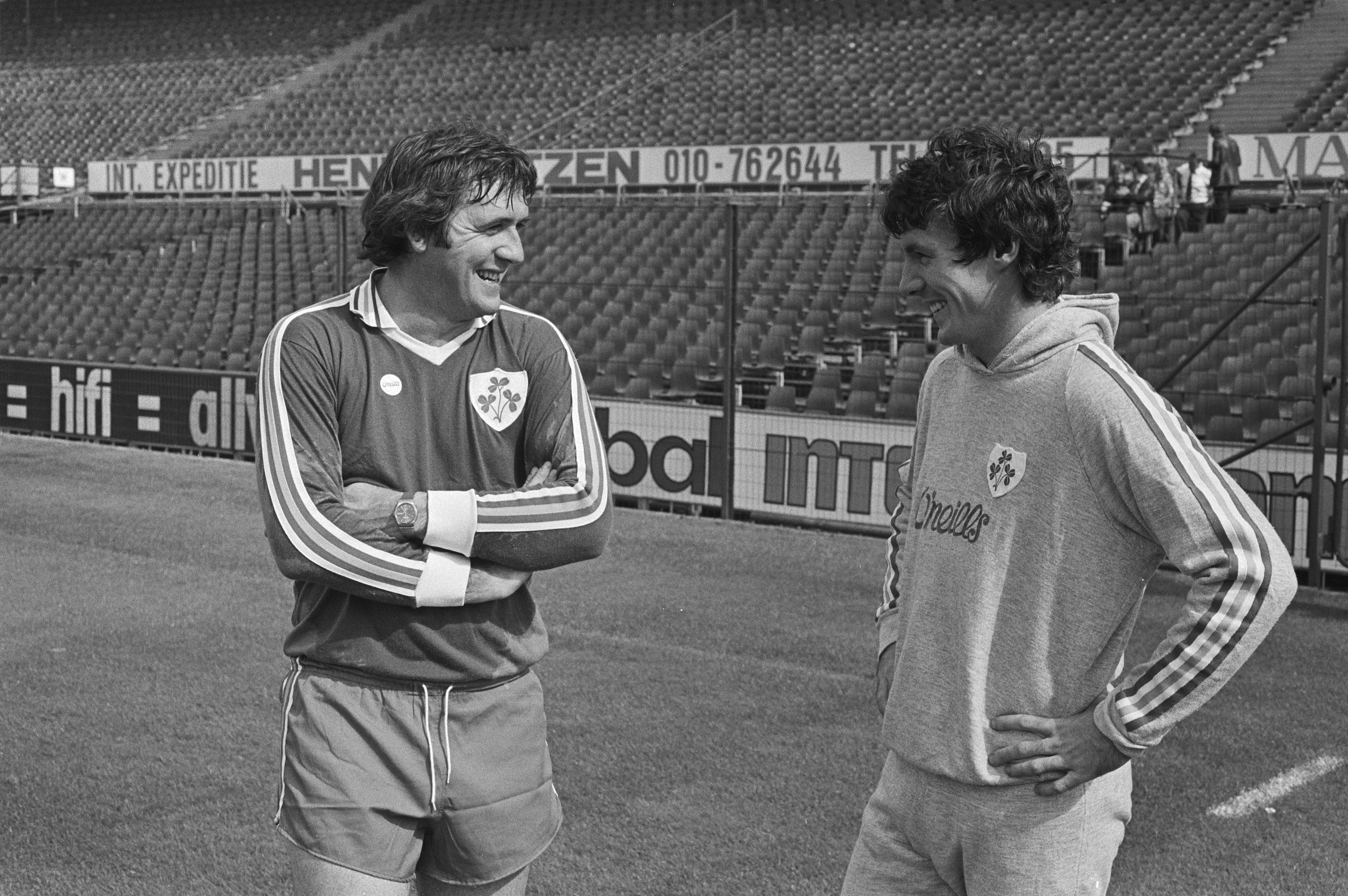
Eoin Hand with Frank Stapleton

In Hand's first World Cup qualifying campaign, Ireland narrowly lost out to France on goal difference. Ireland conceded a late goal to Belgium after having what some commentators describe as a 'perfectly good goal' disallowed. The image of Hand on the bench with his head in his hands post match is widely shown in Ireland as one of Irish sport's most heartbreaking images.

Ireland finished an unremarkable third in the qualifying campaign for Euro 84 and, shortly afterwards, Hand combined club and international management again when he was appointed manager of St Patrick's Athletic FC, however, he stayed only one season with the Dublin club. His managerial contract was finished when he failed to qualify for the 1986 World Cup; he was replaced by Jack Charlton.

In 1988, he was appointed manager of Huddersfield Town and remained there until 1992. He also managed Shelbourne F.C. briefly during the 1993–94 season.

== FAI work ==
Hand began working with the FAI in 1999 as a career guidance officer. His position was terminated in July 2012. Following this, he took a case of unfair dismissal against the FAI and was initially successful. The FAI appealed this decision to the Labour Court and were ultimately successful. The Court found that Hand had been a consultant to the FAI at all times rather than an employee.

During his tenure as career guidance officer, Hand played a key role in the campaign by Crumlin United to secure a portion of the £7m transfer of Robbie Keane from Leeds United to Tottenham Hotspur under the FIFA Solidarity Mechanism.

== Personal life ==
Hand successfully underwent an operation for pancreatitis in 1997, after which he gave up smoking and drinking. He is heavily involved in his passion for playing music and devoting his spare time to raising funds for charities. Hand now lives in Moyvane in North Kerry with his wife Pauline.

== Managerial honours ==
- League of Ireland
  - Limerick F.C. 1979/80
- FAI Cup
  - Limerick F.C. 1982
- SWAI Personality of the Year
  - Limerick F.C. – 1980

== Sources ==
- Paul Doolan; Robert Goggins (1993). The Hoops. Gill & MacMillan. ISBN 0-7171-2121-6.
