= 1978–79 Huddersfield Town A.F.C. season =

Huddersfield Town
1978–79 season
- Chairman: Keith Longbottom
- Manager: Tom Johnston (until 29 August 1978); Mick Buxton (from 31 October 1978)
- Stadium: Leeds Road
- Football League Fourth Division: 9th
- FA Cup: First round (eliminated by Doncaster Rovers)
- Football League Cup: First round (eliminated by Preston North End)
- Top goalscorer: League: Ian Robins (16); All: Ian Robins (16)
- Highest home attendance: 9,382 vs Barnsley (2 May 1979)
- Lowest home attendance: 1,680 vs Torquay United (30 April 1979)
- Biggest win: 3–0 vs Wimbledon (21 October 1978)
- Biggest defeat: 0–3 vs Preston North End (12 August 1978); 0–3 vs Hereford United (25 April 1979)

Huddersfield Town's 1978-79 campaign was Town's penultimate season in their 5-year stint in the Football League's basement division. It also saw the arrival of Mick Buxton at the club, he would be Town's second longest manager in the club's history. After replacing Tom Johnston, Town gained a resurgence in their form and then finished in 9th place. It would be a precursor to Town's championship winning team the next season.

== Squad at the start of the season ==
Note: Flags indicate national team as defined under FIFA eligibility rules; some limited exceptions apply. Players may hold more than one non-FIFA nationality.

Pos.	Nation	Player
GK	ENG	Alan Starling
GK	ENG	Dick Taylor
DF	ENG	Jim Branagan
DF	ENG	Malcolm Brown
DF	ENG	Paul Gartland
DF	ENG	Phil Sandercock
DF	ENG	Dave Sutton
DF	ENG	Chris Topping
MF	ENG	Terry Armstrong
MF	ENG	Paul Bielby

Pos.	Nation	Player
MF	ENG	David Cowling
MF	ENG	Keith Hanvey
MF	ENG	Peter Hart
MF	ENG	Ian Holmes
MF	ENG	Keith Ripley
FW	ENG	Peter Fletcher
FW	ENG	Terry Gray
FW	ENG	Peter Howey
FW	ENG	Mark Lillis
FW	SCO	Frank McGrellis (on loan from Coventry City)

== Review ==
Following on from the previous season's disappointments and the early season's poor form, Tom Johnston resigned and following a spell as caretaker, Mick Buxton became the new manager and helped Town recover their form mainly from the signing from Bury and the conversion of Keith Hanvey from midfield to defence to partner Dave Sutton in the centre.

Town would finish the season in 9th place with just 47 points, but the following season would see Town return to Division 3 in style.

== Squad at the end of the season ==
Note: Flags indicate national team as defined under FIFA eligibility rules; some limited exceptions apply. Players may hold more than one non-FIFA nationality.

Pos.	Nation	Player
GK	ENG	Alan Starling
GK	ENG	Dick Taylor
DF	ENG	Jim Branagan
DF	ENG	Malcolm Brown
DF	ENG	Paul Gartland
DF	ENG	Keith Hanvey
DF	ENG	Phil Sandercock
DF	ENG	Dave Sutton
DF	ENG	Chris Topping
MF	ENG	Terry Armstrong
MF	ENG	Paul Bielby

Pos.	Nation	Player
MF	ENG	David Cowling
MF	ENG	Peter Hart
MF	ENG	Ian Holmes
MF	ENG	Keith Ripley
FW	ENG	Daryl Brook
FW	ENG	Peter Fletcher
FW	ENG	Terry Gray
FW	ENG	Peter Howey
FW	ENG	Mark Lillis
FW	ENG	Ian Robins
FW	ENG	Tommy Smith

== Results ==
=== Division Four ===
Date	Opponents	Home/ Away	Result F - A	Scorers	Attendance	Position
19 August 1978	Crewe Alexandra	H	0 - 0		2,838	13th
22 August 1978	Darlington	A	0 - 1		2,549	18th
25 August 1978	Scunthorpe United	A	1 - 3	Hanvey	3,200	19th
2 September 1978	Reading	H	1 - 1	Bielby (pen)	2,951	21st
9 September 1978	Doncaster Rovers	H	2 - 1	Hanvey, Bielby	4,038	16th
12 September 1978	Bournemouth	A	0 - 2		2,416	18th
16 September 1978	Barnsley	A	0 - 1		11,794	20th
23 September 1978	Northampton Town	H	1 - 0	Holmes	3,320	17th
26 September 1978	Grimsby Town	H	2 - 0	Brolly (og), Campbell (pen)	4,238	16th
29 September 1978	Stockport County	A	1 - 3	Bielby (pen)	5,554	17th
7 October 1978	Wigan Athletic	H	1 - 1	Bielby (pen)	5,150	16th
14 October 1978	Newport County	A	1 - 2	Robins	3,624	22nd
17 October 1978	Hereford United	H	2 - 3	Campbell (2)	2,565	22nd
21 October 1978	Wimbledon	H	3 - 0	Robins (2), Bielby	3,374	18th
28 October 1978	Bradford City	A	1 - 1	Fletcher	5,478	19th
4 November 1978	York City	H	1 - 0	Sutton	3,696	16th
11 November 1978	Reading	A	1 - 1	Robins	6,870	15th
18 November 1978	Scunthorpe United	H	3 - 2	Topping, Gray, Fletcher	3,375	15th
2 December 1978	Aldershot	H	0 - 0		3,138	13th
9 December 1978	Portsmouth	A	0 - 1		11,615	15th
26 December 1978	Halifax Town	H	2 - 0	Fletcher, Robins	5,341	16th
1 January 1979	Port Vale	A	0 - 1		4,021	17th
3 February 1979	Grimsby Town	A	1 - 2	Robins	4,921	17th
17 February 1979	Wigan Athletic	A	1 - 2	Robins	7,420	18th
24 February 1979	Newport County	H	0 - 1		3,361	20th
27 February 1979	Doncaster Rovers	A	2 - 0	Holmes, Howey	3,419	18th
3 March 1979	Wimbledon	A	1 - 2	Holmes	3,265	18th
6 March 1979	Northampton Town	A	3 - 2	Holmes (2), Robins	1,823	18th
10 March 1979	Bradford City	H	0 - 0		6,188	18th
13 March 1979	Bournemouth	H	2 - 1	Fletcher, Armstrong	2,268	18th
24 March 1979	Darlington	H	2 - 2	Robins (2)	2,862	18th
28 March 1979	Crewe Alexandra	A	3 - 3	Fletcher (2), Holmes	1,382	18th
31 March 1979	Hartlepool United	H	2 - 0	Robins, Holmes	2,420	16th
4 April 1979	Stockport County	H	0 - 0		2,267	14th
7 April 1979	Aldershot	A	0 - 1		4,215	16th
10 April 1979	Rochdale	A	2 - 0	Fletcher, Robins	2,020	13th
14 April 1979	Halifax Town	A	3 - 2	Fletcher (2), Holmes	4,027	12th
16 April 1979	Port Vale	H	3 - 2	Robins, Fletcher, Holmes	3,236	10th
17 April 1979	Rochdale	H	1 - 0	Fletcher	3,346	9th
21 April 1979	Torquay United	A	1 - 2	Holmes	2,478	9th
25 April 1979	Hereford United	A	0 - 3		2,635	11th
28 April 1979	Portsmouth	H	2 - 0	Robins, Fletcher (pen)	2,895	10th
30 April 1979	Torquay United	H	1 - 1	Hart	1,680	10th
2 May 1979	Barnsley	H	1 - 0	Robins	9,382	9th
5 May 1979	Hartlepool United	A	0 - 2		2,207	10th
19 May 1979	York City	A	3 - 1	Holmes, Cowling, Robins	2,664	9th

=== FA Cup ===
Date	Round	Opponents	Home/ Away	Result F - A	Scorers	Attendance
25 November 1978	Round 1	Doncaster Rovers	A	1 - 2	Fletcher	4,330

=== Football League Cup ===
Date	Round	Opponents	Home/ Away	Result F - A	Scorers	Attendance
12 August 1978	Round 1 1st Leg	Preston North End	A	0 - 3		6,841
15 August 1978	Round 1 2nd Leg	Preston North End	H	2 - 2	Holmes, Ripley (pen)	3,435: Huddersfield lost 5–2 on aggregate.

== Appearances and goals ==
Name	Nationality	Position	League		FA Cup		League Cup		Total	
Name	Nationality	Position	Apps	Goals	Apps	Goals	Apps	Goals	Apps	Goals
Terry Armstrong	England	FW	15 (2)	1	0	0	0	0	15 (2)	1
Paul Bielby	England	MF	29 (2)	5	1	0	0	0	30 (2)	5
Jim Branagan	England	DF	13 (1)	0	0	0	0	0	13 (1)	0
Daryl Brook	England	FW	1	0	0	0	0	0	1	0
Malcolm Brown	England	DF	42	0	1	0	2	0	45	0
Bobby Campbell	Northern Ireland	FW	7	3	0	0	0	0	7	3
David Cowling	England	MF	25 (1)	1	1	0	0	0	26 (1)	1
Peter Fletcher	England	FW	31 (4)	12	0 (1)	1	2	0	33 (5)	13
Paul Gartland	England	DF	4	0	0	0	0	0	4	0
Terry Gray	England	FW	22 (4)	1	1	0	0	0	23 (4)	1
Keith Hanvey	England	DF	32	2	0	0	2	0	34	2
Peter Hart	England	MF	46	1	1	0	2	0	49	1
Ian Holmes	England	MF	31 (3)	11	0	0	2	1	33 (3)	12
Peter Howey	England	MF	10	1	0	0	2	0	12	1
Mark Lillis	England	MF	11 (1)	0	1	0	0	0	12 (1)	0
Frank McGrellis	Scotland	FW	4 (1)	0	0	0	2	0	6 (1)	0
Keith Ripley	England	MF	2 (3)	0	0	0	0 (1)	1	2 (4)	1
Ian Robins	England	FW	37 (1)	16	1	0	0	0	38 (1)	16
Phil Sandercock	England	DF	36	0	1	0	2	0	39	0
Tommy Smith	England	FW	0 (1)	0	0	0	0	0	0 (1)	0
Alan Starling	England	GK	45	0	1	0	2	0	48	0
Dave Sutton	England	DF	39	1	1	0	2	0	42	1
Dick Taylor	England	GK	1	0	0	0	0	0	1	0
Chris Topping	England	DF	23	1	1	0	2	0	26	1
