= 1979–80 Huddersfield Town A.F.C. season =

Huddersfield Town
1979–80 season
- Chairman: Keith Longbottom
- Manager: Mick Buxton
- Stadium: Leeds Road
- Football League Fourth Division: 1st (promoted)
- FA Cup: First round (eliminated by Darlington)
- Football League Cup: Second round (eliminated by Grimsby Town)
- Top goalscorer: League: Ian Robins (25); All: Ian Robins (27)
- Highest home attendance: 17,233 vs Walsall (12 April 1980)
- Lowest home attendance: 2,944 vs Crewe Alexandra (11 August 1979)
- Biggest win: 6–0 vs Northwich Victoria (25 November 1979)
- Biggest defeat: 1–4 vs Grimsby Town (4 September 1979); 1–4 vs Portsmouth (23 February 1980)

Huddersfield Town's 1979–80 campaign is one of Town's most successful in their history, gaining promotion from the Division 4 title, the last season in which Town won the divisional title. They finished two points clear of Walsall. In Mick Buxton's first full season in charge, Town scored 101 league goals, the only season in which Town have scored more than 100 league goals in their entire history. This ended Town's five-year stint in the basement division. The only season after this that they were in the 4th tier was in the 2003–04 season.

== Squad at the start of the season ==
Note: Flags indicate national team as defined under FIFA eligibility rules; some limited exceptions apply. Players may hold more than one non-FIFA nationality.

Pos.	Nation	Player
GK	ENG	Alan Starling
DF	ENG	Jim Branagan
DF	ENG	Malcolm Brown
DF	ENG	Keith Hanvey
DF	ENG	Fred Robinson
DF	ENG	Dave Sutton
DF	ENG	Chris Topping
MF	ENG	David Cowling

Pos.	Nation	Player
MF	ENG	Peter Hart
MF	ENG	Ian Holmes
MF	ENG	Mick Laverick
FW	ENG	Peter Fletcher
FW	ENG	Mark Lillis
FW	ENG	Ian Robins
FW	ENG	Tommy Smith

== Review ==
With Mick Buxton at the helm for his first full season, many were thinking that after his team's good form in the previous season, that promotion to Division 3 was possible and a good start to the season didn't dampen spirits. In the first 12 games, Town won 10 of them including a 7–1 win against Port Vale. But after a run in November and December of 4 games without a win, manager Buxton brought in Steve Kindon from Burnley just before Christmas. It proved to be an inspired signing, he scored 14 goals in his 23 games for Town during the second half of the season.

However, Ian Robins topped the goalscoring charts for the whole 4th Division with 25 league goals. He and Malcolm Brown were put in the "Divisional Team of the Season". They guaranteed their promotion with a 2–1 win over Scunthorpe United with 3 matches to go. Amongst other big victories were 5–0 victories against Northampton Town, Stockport County, Halifax Town and a 5–1 win over Rochdale. The last game of the season against Hartlepool United also saw Town scored their 100th and 101st league goals of their season, the only time Town have reached triple figures in goals in their entire history. They finished 2 points clear of Walsall in 1st position. This is their last season as champions of any division.

== Squad at the end of the season ==
Note: Flags indicate national team as defined under FIFA eligibility rules; some limited exceptions apply. Players may hold more than one non-FIFA nationality.

Pos.	Nation	Player
GK	ENG	Andy Rankin
GK	ENG	Alan Starling
DF	ENG	Malcolm Brown
DF	ENG	Keith Hanvey
DF	ENG	Fred Robinson
DF	ENG	Dave Sutton
DF	ENG	Chris Topping
MF	ENG	David Cowling
MF	ENG	Peter Hart

Pos.	Nation	Player
MF	ENG	Ian Holmes
MF	ENG	Mick Laverick
MF	WAL	Bernard Purdie
MF	ENG	Brian Stanton
FW	ENG	Peter Fletcher
FW	ENG	Steve Kindon
FW	ENG	Mark Lillis
FW	ENG	Ian Robins
FW	ENG	Tommy Smith

== Results ==
=== Division Four ===
Date	Opponents	Home/ Away	Result F–A	Scorers	Attendance	Position
18 August 1979	Aldershot	H	2–0	Robins, Hart	3,313	5th
22 August 1979	Wigan Athletic	A	2–1	Holmes, Fletcher	6,927	3rd
25 August 1979	Doncaster Rovers	H	3–0	Holmes (pen), Cowling, Robins	5,232	3rd
1 September 1979	Lincoln City	A	0–2		4,272	5th
8 September 1979	Newport County	H	2–1	Fletcher, Robins	3,134	3rd
14 September 1979	Scunthorpe United	A	1–1	Stanton	2,564	3rd
19 September 1979	Crewe Alexandra	A	3–1	Robins, Brown, Fletcher	2,104	4th
22 September 1979	Port Vale	H	7–1	Fletcher, Delgado (og), Hart (2), Robins (2), Stanton	4,299	4th
28 September 1979	Stockport County	A	2–1	Laverick, Hart	5,369	1st
2 October 1979	Crewe Alexandra	H	3–0	Robins, Robinson (pen), Fletcher	5,788	2nd
6 October 1979	Peterborough United	A	3–1	Robins (2), Fletcher	5,183	2nd
9 October 1979	Wigan Athletic	H	4–0	Stanton, Fletcher (2), Cowling	7,871	1st
13 October 1979	Portsmouth	H	1–3	Fletcher	16,540	2nd
20 October 1979	Bournemouth	A	3–1	Cowling, Fletcher, Laverick	4,895	2nd
23 October 1979	Northampton Town	A	2–4	Cowling, Byatt (og)	3,210	2nd
27 October 1979	York City	H	2–2	Cowling (2, 1 pen)	7,547	1st
3 November 1979	Aldershot	A	2–0	Fletcher, Robins	5,271	1st
6 November 1979	Northampton Town	H	5–0	Robins (2), Laverick, Cowling, Sutton	6,552	1st
10 November 1979	Bradford City	A	0–0		10,509	1st
17 November 1979	Tranmere Rovers	H	1–1	Fletcher	7,069	1st
1 December 1979	Hereford United	H	0–1		5,582	2nd
8 December 1979	Torquay United	A	1–3	Holmes	4,044	3rd
21 December 1979	Rochdale	H	5–1	Sutton, Cowling, Fletcher, Brown, Robins	4,550	3rd
26 December 1979	Halifax Town	A	1–2	Dunleavy (og)	10,061	3rd
29 December 1979	Doncaster Rovers	A	2–1	Stanton, Kindon	7,337	3rd
1 January 1980	Darlington	H	2–1	Hanvey, Robins	9,898	2nd
5 January 1980	Walsall	A	1–1	Kindon	7,639	2nd
12 January 1980	Lincoln City	H	3–2	Robins, Kindon (pen), Fletcher	8,108	2nd
18 January 1980	Newport County	A	2–2	Sutton, Laverick	4,851	1st
26 January 1980	Hartlepool United	A	1–1	Kindon	5,919	2nd
9 February 1980	Port Vale	A	1–1	Cowling	5,143	2nd
16 February 1980	Stockport County	H	5–0	Kindon, Stanton (3), Robins	7,561	2nd
23 February 1980	Portsmouth	A	1–4	Kindon	19,203	2nd
1 March 1980	Bournemouth	H	2–0	Robins, Hanvey	7,740	2nd
8 March 1980	York City	A	4–0	Robins, Kindon (2), Cowling	5,742	2nd
15 March 1980	Peterborough United	H	0–0		8,172	2nd
22 March 1980	Bradford City	H	0–0		14,875	2nd
29 March 1980	Tranmere Rovers	A	0–0		3,232	2nd
1 April 1980	Rochdale	A	2–0	Kindon (2)	4,979	2nd
5 April 1980	Halifax Town	H	5–0	Robins (2), Kindon (2, 1 pen), Sutton	10,580	2nd
8 April 1980	Darlington	A	3–2	Kindon (pen), Stanton, Craig (og)	4,628	2nd
12 April 1980	Walsall	H	1–1	Stanton	17,233	2nd
15 April 1980	Scunthorpe United	H	2–1	Robins (2)	10,900	2nd
19 April 1980	Hereford United	A	3–1	Kindon, Fletcher (2)	4,278	2nd
26 April 1980	Torquay United	H	4–2	Fletcher, Sutton (2), Robins	11,067	1st
3 May 1980	Hartlepool United	H	2–1	Robins (2)	16,807	1st

=== FA Cup ===
Date	Round	Opponents	Home/ Away	Result F–A	Scorers	Attendance
24 November 1979	Round 1	Darlington	A	1–1	Hart	3,678
27 November 1979	Round 1 Replay	Darlington	H	0–1		8,084

=== Football League Cup ===
Date	Round	Opponents	Home/ Away	Result F–A	Scorers	Attendance
11 August 1979	Round 1 1st Leg	Crewe Alexandra	H	2–1	Brown, Sutton	2,944
15 August 1979	Round 1 2nd Leg	Crewe Alexandra	A	3–1	Robins (2), Fletcher	3,920: Huddersfield won 5–2 on aggregate.
28 August 1979	Round 2 1st Leg	Grimsby Town	A	0–1		7,803
4 September 1979	Round 2 2nd Leg	Grimsby Town	H	1–4	Holmes (pen)	5,550: Huddersfield lost 5–1 on aggregate.

== Appearances and goals ==
Name	Nationality	Position	League		FA Cup		League Cup		Total	
Name	Nationality	Position	Apps	Goals	Apps	Goals	Apps	Goals	Apps	Goals
Jim Branagan	England	DF	0	0	0	0	0 (1)	0	0 (1)	0
Malcolm Brown	England	DF	46	2	2	0	4	1	52	3
David Cowling	England	MF	39 (1)	10	1	0	4	0	44 (1)	10
Peter Fletcher	England	FW	30 (8)	17	2	0	3	1	35 (8)	18
Keith Hanvey	England	DF	33	2	0	0	4	0	39	2
Peter Hart	England	MF	46	4	1	1	4	0	51	5
Ian Holmes	England	MF	6 (4)	3	0	0	4	1	10 (4)	4
Steve Kindon	England	FW	22 (1)	14	0	0	0	0	22 (1)	14
Mick Laverick	England	MF	45	4	2	0	4	0	51	4
Bernard Purdie	Wales	DF	18 (4)	0	2	0	0	0	20 (4)	0
Andy Rankin	England	GK	24	0	0	0	0	0	24	0
Ian Robins	England	FW	45	25	2	0	4	2	51	27
Fred Robinson	England	DF	30	1	2	0	4	0	36	1
Tommy Smith	England	FW	0	0	0	0	1	0	1	0
Brian Stanton	England	MF	41	9	2	0	0	0	43	9
Alan Starling	England	GK	22	0	2	0	4	0	28	0
Dave Sutton	England	DF	46	6	2	0	4	1	52	7
Chris Topping	England	DF	13	0	2	0	0	0	15	0
