= 1980–81 Huddersfield Town A.F.C. season =

Huddersfield Town
1980–81 season
- Chairman: Keith Longbottom
- Manager: Mick Buxton
- Stadium: Leeds Road
- Football League Third Division: 4th
- FA Cup: Third round (eliminated by Shrewsbury Town)
- Football League Cup: First round (eliminated by Blackburn Rovers)
- Top goalscorer: League: Steve Kindon (18); All: Steve Kindon (19)
- Highest home attendance: 28,901 vs Barnsley (7 February 1981)
- Lowest home attendance: 6,965 vs Fulham (2 May 1981)
- Biggest win: 6–0 vs Northwich Victoria (25 November 1980)
- Biggest defeat: 0–3 vs Shrewsbury Town (3 January 1981)

Huddersfield Town's 1980–81 campaign was very successful following on from the previous season's brilliant promotion from the Fourth Division. The team just missed out on earning back-to-back promotions, by finishing in 4th place, just 3 points behind 3rd-placed Charlton Athletic.

== Squad at the start of the season ==
Note: Flags indicate national team as defined under FIFA eligibility rules; some limited exceptions apply. Players may hold more than one non-FIFA nationality.

| Pos. | Nation | Player |
|---|---|---|
| GK | ENG | Andy Rankin |
| DF | ENG | Malcolm Brown |
| DF | ENG | Keith Hanvey |
| DF | ENG | Fred Robinson |
| DF | ENG | Dave Sutton |
| DF | ENG | Chris Topping |
| MF | ENG | David Cowling |
| MF | ENG | Bobby Davison |

| Pos. | Nation | Player |
|---|---|---|
| MF | ENG | Mick Kennedy |
| MF | ENG | Mick Laverick |
| MF | WAL | Bernard Purdie |
| MF | ENG | Brian Stanton |
| FW | ENG | Peter Fletcher |
| FW | ENG | Steve Kindon |
| FW | ENG | Mark Lillis |
| FW | ENG | Ian Robins |

== Review ==
Following the successful promotion campaign from Division Four, many fans were hoping for a quick return to Division Two. After a shaky start, in which it took Town 5 games to win a match, but they started a charge up the Division 3 table, with a run of 5 straight wins between 30 September and mid-October. Then followed a mid-period of mediocrity, which led onto a run of 12 matches unbeaten including a win against Barnsley, watched by nearly 30,000 people.

After losing two games on the trot to Reading and Swindon Town, they went on a run of 6 matches unbeaten which included a 5–0 win against Exeter City. They then lost against Millwall, Burnley and Hull City ended Town's promotion hopes, despite beating both Portsmouth and Fulham at the end of the season to finish in 4th place.

== Squad at the end of the season ==
Note: Flags indicate national team as defined under FIFA eligibility rules; some limited exceptions apply. Players may hold more than one non-FIFA nationality.

| Pos. | Nation | Player |
|---|---|---|
| GK | ENG | Neil Freeman (on loan from Birmingham City) |
| GK | ENG | Andy Rankin |
| DF | ENG | Malcolm Brown |
| DF | ENG | Keith Hanvey |
| DF | ENG | Fred Robinson |
| DF | ENG | Dave Sutton |
| DF | ENG | Chris Topping |
| MF | ENG | David Cowling |
| MF | ENG | Bobby Davison |

| Pos. | Nation | Player |
|---|---|---|
| MF | ENG | Mick Kennedy |
| MF | ENG | Mick Laverick |
| MF | WAL | Bernard Purdie |
| MF | ENG | Brian Stanton |
| FW | ENG | Terry Austin |
| FW | ENG | Peter Fletcher |
| FW | ENG | Steve Kindon |
| FW | ENG | Mark Lillis |
| FW | ENG | Ian Robins |

== Results ==
=== Division Three ===
| Date | Opponents | Home/ Away | Result F–A | Scorers | Attendance | Position |
|---|---|---|---|---|---|---|
| 16 August 1980 | Chesterfield | A | 1–2 | Kindon | 7,819 | 17th |
| 19 August 1980 | Carlisle United | H | 1–1 | Robinson | 7,674 | 17th |
| 23 August 1980 | Blackpool | H | 1–1 | Laverick | 9,490 | 15th |
| 30 August 1980 | Rotherham United | A | 0–0 | | 6,961 | 16th |
| 6 September 1980 | Reading | H | 4–1 | Death (og), Kennedy (pen), Laverick, Stanton | 7,312 | 12th |
| 13 September 1980 | Barnsley | A | 0–1 | | 13,819 | 16th |
| 16 September 1980 | Gillingham | A | 0–0 | | 5,092 | 16th |
| 20 September 1980 | Sheffield United | H | 1–0 | Stanton | 14,721 | 13th |
| 27 September 1980 | Swindon Town | A | 0–1 | | 5,856 | 13th |
| 30 September 1980 | Gillingham | H | 1–0 | Kindon | 7,716 | 11th |
| 4 October 1980 | Colchester United | H | 2–0 | Kindon (pen), Brown | 8,400 | 8th |
| 8 October 1980 | Oxford United | A | 2–0 | Robins, Cowling | 3,373 | 6th |
| 11 October 1980 | Exeter City | A | 4–1 | Kindon (3), Stanton | 4,769 | 4th |
| 18 October 1980 | Plymouth Argyle | H | 2–0 | Robins, Kennedy | 11,655 | 2nd |
| 21 October 1980 | Burnley | H | 0–0 | | 15,741 | 3rd |
| 25 October 1980 | Newport County | A | 2–3 | Kindon (2, 1 pen) | 6,403 | 6th |
| 29 October 1980 | Chester | A | 2–0 | Kindon, Robins | 4,331 | 3rd |
| 1 November 1980 | Charlton Athletic | H | 0–1 | | 11,329 | 5th |
| 4 November 1980 | Oxford United | H | 2–0 | Kindon, Robins | 7,543 | 4th |
| 8 November 1980 | Millwall | A | 1–2 | Robins | 3,529 | 6th |
| 11 November 1980 | Carlisle United | A | 1–1 | Kindon | 3,998 | 6th |
| 15 November 1980 | Chesterfield | H | 2–0 | Kindon, Brown | 12,828 | 5th |
| 29 November 1980 | Brentford | H | 3–0 | Robins, Kindon (pen), Stanton | 8,871 | 4th |
| 6 December 1980 | Fulham | A | 2–2 | Lillis, Stanton | 4,513 | 5th |
| 20 December 1980 | Portsmouth | H | 0–0 | | 10,869 | 6th |
| 26 December 1980 | Walsall | A | 2–2 | Austin (2) | 5,906 | 6th |
| 27 December 1980 | Hull City | H | 5–0 | Stanton, Austin, Cowling, Lillis, Robins | 13,240 | 5th |
| 10 January 1981 | Newport County | H | 4–1 | Stanton (2), Austin, Cowling | 9,063 | 4th |
| 17 January 1981 | Brentford | A | 0–0 | | 5,830 | 4th |
| 24 January 1981 | Rotherham United | H | 1–0 | Stanton | 16,687 | 4th |
| 31 January 1981 | Blackpool | A | 2–1 | Austin (2) | 9,431 | 4th |
| 7 February 1981 | Barnsley | H | 1–0 | Cowling | 28,901 | 3rd |
| 14 February 1981 | Reading | A | 1–2 | Lillis | 5,290 | 3rd |
| 21 February 1981 | Swindon Town | H | 0–2 | | 10,655 | 3rd |
| 28 February 1981 | Sheffield United | A | 2–2 | Kindon (2) | 14,426 | 3rd |
| 7 March 1981 | Colchester United | A | 2–1 | Robins, Lillis | 3,644 | 3rd |
| 17 March 1981 | Plymouth Argyle | A | 0–0 | | 5,433 | 2nd |
| 28 March 1981 | Chester | H | 0–0 | | 11,117 | 3rd |
| 4 April 1981 | Charlton Athletic | A | 2–1 | Brown, Kindon | 8,878 | 3rd |
| 7 April 1981 | Exeter City | H | 5–0 | Hanvey, Lillis (2), Stanton (2) | 12,009 | 3rd |
| 11 April 1981 | Millwall | H | 0–1 | | 13,353 | 4th |
| 14 April 1981 | Burnley | A | 2–4 | Kindon, Stanton | 11,075 | 4th |
| 18 April 1981 | Hull City | A | 1–2 | Robins | 6,328 | 4th |
| 21 April 1981 | Walsall | H | 1–1 | Lillis | 9,463 | 4th |
| 25 April 1981 | Portsmouth | A | 2–1 | Austin (2) | 10,238 | 4th |
| 2 May 1981 | Fulham | H | 4–2 | Robins (2), Kindon, Sutton | 6,965 | 4th |

=== FA Cup ===
| Date | Round | Opponents | Home/ Away | Result F–A | Scorers | Attendance |
|---|---|---|---|---|---|---|
| 22 November 1980 | Round 1 | Northwich Victoria | A | 1–1 | Stanton | 6,685 |
| 25 November 1980 | Round 1 Replay | Northwich Victoria | H | 6–0 | Stanton (2), Robins (2), Hanvey, Laverick | 9,849 |
| 13 December 1980 | Round 2 | Tranmere Rovers | A | 3–0 | Stanton, Robins (2) | 6,763 |
| 3 January 1981 | Round 3 | Shrewsbury Town | H | 0–3 | | 14,712 |

=== Football League Cup ===
| Date | Round | Opponents | Home/ Away | Result F–A | Scorers | Attendance |
|---|---|---|---|---|---|---|
| 9 August 1980 | Round 1 1st Leg | Blackburn Rovers | A | 0–0 | | 8,670 |
| 12 August 1980 | Round 1 2nd Leg | Blackburn Rovers | H | 1 – 1 (aet: 90 mins: 1 – 1) | Kindon | 9,500: 1–1 on aggregate.; Huddersfield lost on away goals rule. |

== Appearances and goals ==
| Name | Nationality | Position | League | | FA Cup | | League Cup | | Total | |
| Name | Nationality | Position | Apps | Goals | Apps | Goals | Apps | Goals | Apps | Goals |
|---|---|---|---|---|---|---|---|---|---|---|
| Terry Austin | England | FW | 16 (2) | 8 | 1 | 0 | 0 | 0 | 17 (2) | 8 |
| Malcolm Brown | England | DF | 46 | 3 | 4 | 0 | 2 | 0 | 52 | 3 |
| David Cowling | England | MF | 43 | 4 | 4 | 0 | 2 | 0 | 49 | 4 |
| Bobby Davison | England | MF | 1 (1) | 0 | 0 | 0 | 0 | 0 | 1 (1) | 0 |
| Neil Freeman (1st Spell) | England | GK | 10 | 0 | 0 | 0 | 0 | 0 | 10 | 0 |
| Neil Freeman (2nd Spell) | England | GK | 8 | 0 | 0 | 0 | 0 | 0 | 8 | 0 |
| Keith Hanvey | England | DF | 45 | 1 | 3 | 1 | 2 | 0 | 50 | 2 |
| Mick Kennedy | England | MF | 41 (1) | 2 | 4 | 0 | 0 (2) | 0 | 45 (3) | 2 |
| Steve Kindon | England | FW | 37 (3) | 18 | 4 | 0 | 2 | 1 | 43 (3) | 19 |
| Mick Laverick | England | MF | 25 | 2 | 1 (1) | 1 | 2 | 0 | 28 (1) | 3 |
| Mark Lillis | England | MF | 29 (5) | 7 | 3 (1) | 0 | 0 | 0 | 32 (6) | 7 |
| Bernard Purdie | Wales | DF | 8 (1) | 0 | 0 | 0 | 2 | 0 | 10 (1) | 0 |
| Andy Rankin | England | GK | 28 | 0 | 4 | 0 | 2 | 0 | 34 | 0 |
| Ian Robins | England | FW | 37 (4) | 11 | 3 (1) | 4 | 2 | 0 | 42 (5) | 15 |
| Fred Robinson | England | DF | 42 | 1 | 4 | 0 | 2 | 0 | 48 | 1 |
| Brian Stanton | England | MF | 44 | 12 | 4 | 4 | 2 | 0 | 50 | 16 |
| Dave Sutton | England | DF | 39 | 1 | 4 | 0 | 2 | 0 | 45 | 1 |
| Chris Topping | England | DF | 7 | 0 | 1 | 0 | 0 | 0 | 8 | 0 |
