= 1981–82 Huddersfield Town A.F.C. season =

Huddersfield Town
1981–82 season
- Chairman: Keith Longbottom
- Manager: Mick Buxton
- Stadium: Leeds Road
- Football League Third Division: 17th
- FA Cup: Fourth round (eliminated by Orient)
- Milk Cup: Second round (eliminated by Brighton & Hove Albion)
- Top goalscorer: League: David Cowling (8); All: Peter Fletcher (14)
- Highest home attendance: 13,623 vs Orient (26 January 1982)
- Lowest home attendance: 3,468 vs Bristol City (4 May 1982)
- Biggest win: 5–0 vs Workington (24 November 1981); 6–1 vs Reading (13 February 1982); 5–0 vs Bristol City (4 May 1982)
- Biggest defeat: 0–4 vs Southend United (1 May 1982)

Huddersfield Town's 1981–82 campaign was a disappointing season for Town following nearly earning back-to-back promotions the previous season. Town only finished in 17th place. They did however have a fairly good season in the FA Cup, reaching the fourth round.

== Squad at the start of the season ==
Note: Flags indicate national team as defined under FIFA eligibility rules; some limited exceptions apply. Players may hold more than one non-FIFA nationality.

Pos.	Nation	Player
GK	ENG	Andy Rankin
GK	ENG	Dick Taylor
DF	ENG	Malcolm Brown
DF	ENG	David Burke
DF	ENG	Keith Hanvey
DF	ENG	Dave Sutton
DF	ENG	Peter Valentine
MF	ENG	David Cowling
MF	ENG	Mick Kennedy

Pos.	Nation	Player
MF	ENG	Mick Laverick
MF	WAL	Bernard Purdie
MF	ENG	Brian Stanton
MF	ENG	Phil Wilson
FW	ENG	Terry Austin
FW	ENG	Peter Fletcher
FW	ENG	Steve Kindon
FW	ENG	Mark Lillis
FW	ENG	Ian Robins

== Review ==
Following the previous season's near miss, many fans were thinking that promotion would be just a formality for the season. The start, however, was very unsensational, with 4 draws and a loss in their first 5 league games. Their form did improve, but the season was mainly noted for the amount of career-ending injuries to Steve Kindon, Andy Rankin, Dick Taylor, Fred Robinson and Peter Fletcher. Even Steve Smith was called up for Town's FA Cup game against Workington.

Town's season seemed to be a battle against relegation back to Division 4, but results such as the thrashings of Reading by 6–1, Swindon Town by 5–1 and the 5–0 defeat of Bristol City, which seemed to guarantee Town's Division 3 status, near the end of May. Town finished with 57 points in the first season in which 3 points for a win was introduced, but a disappointing finishing position of 17th, would be a distant memory after next season's exploits.

== Squad at the end of the season ==
Note: Flags indicate national team as defined under FIFA eligibility rules; some limited exceptions apply. Players may hold more than one non-FIFA nationality.

Pos.	Nation	Player
GK	ENG	Brian Cox (on loan from Sheffield Wednesday)
GK	ENG	Andy Rankin
GK	ENG	Dick Taylor
DF	ENG	Malcolm Brown
DF	ENG	David Burke
DF	ENG	Keith Hanvey
DF	ENG	Dave Sutton
DF	ENG	Peter Valentine
MF	ENG	David Cowling
MF	ENG	Mick Kennedy

Pos.	Nation	Player
MF	WAL	Bernard Purdie
MF	ENG	Brian Stanton
MF	ENG	Phil Wilson
FW	ENG	Terry Austin
FW	ENG	Peter Fletcher
FW	ENG	Tim Hotte
FW	ENG	Steve Kindon
FW	ENG	Mark Lillis
FW	ENG	Ian Robins

== Results ==
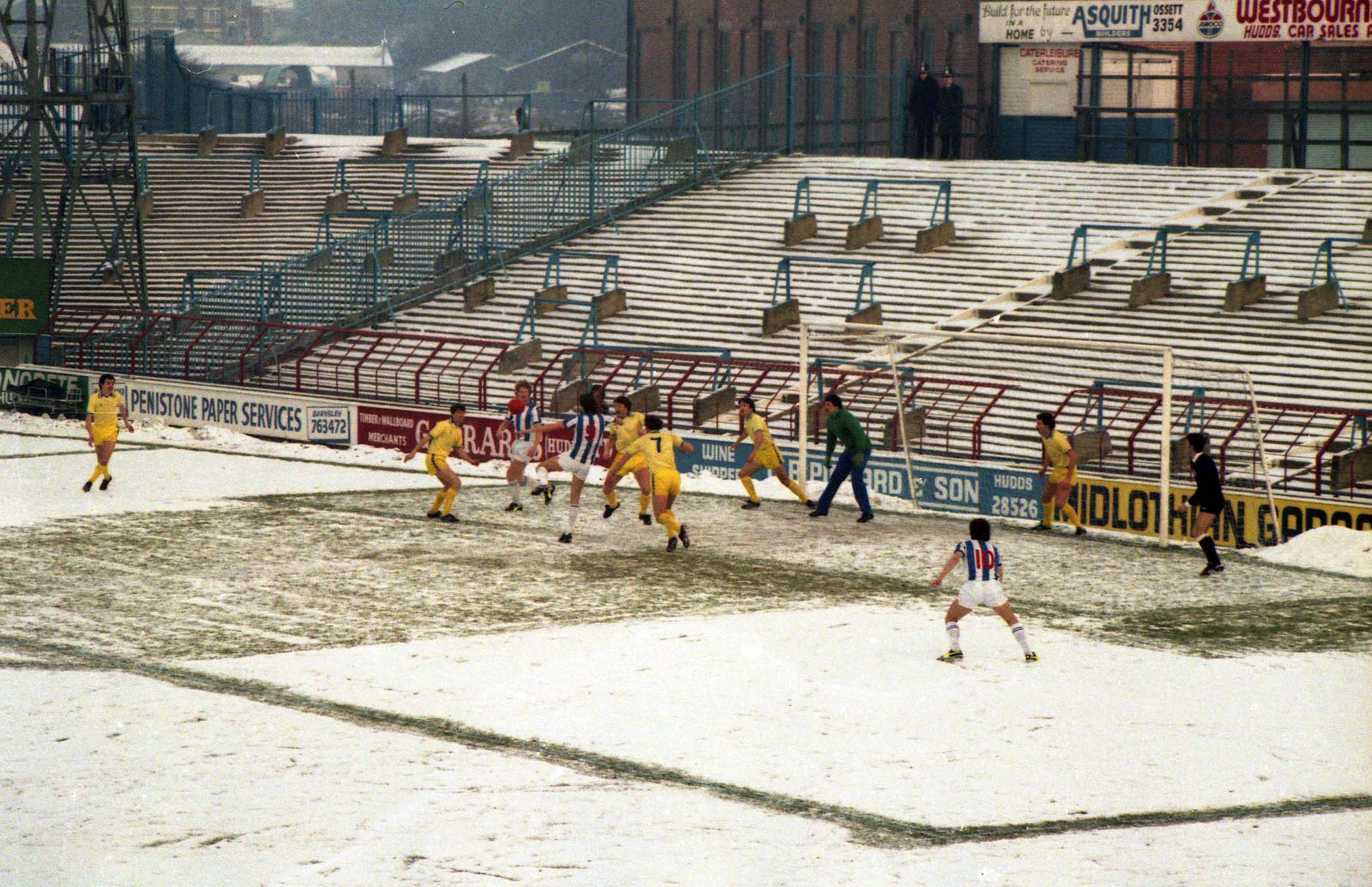
Huddersield Town playing Oxford United on 9th January 1982.

=== Division Three ===
Date	Opponents	Home/ Away	Result F–A	Scorers	Attendance	Position
29 August 1981	Exeter City	H	1–1	Kindon	8,647	13th
5 September 1981	Oxford United	A	0–1		3,976	19th
12 September 1981	Wimbledon	H	1–1	Fletcher	7,326	21st
19 September 1981	Burnley	A	0–0		6,485	21st
22 September 1981	Preston North End	A	1–1	Kennedy	6,483	19th
26 September 1981	Southend United	H	3–2	Kindon (pen), Robins, Kennedy (pen)	7,254	15th
29 September 1981	Chester	H	1–2	Robins	7,747	18th
3 October 1981	Reading	A	2–1	Kindon (pen), Hicks (og)	4,971	15th
10 October 1981	Fulham	H	1–0	Robins	8,258	12th
17 October 1981	Gillingham	A	2–3	Weatherly (og), Hanvey	4,432	16th
20 October 1981	Carlisle United	H	2–1	Burke, Cowling	7,185	11th
24 October 1981	Bristol Rovers	A	2–3	Lillis, Kennedy (pen)	5,064	15th
31 October 1981	Millwall	H	1–2	Robins	8,546	17th
3 November 1981	Chesterfield	A	0–1		6,847	18th
6 November 1981	Doncaster Rovers	A	2–1	Kennedy, Laverick	11,319	15th
14 November 1981	Swindon Town	H	3–0	Laverick (2), Hanvey	7,802	14th
28 November 1981	Portsmouth	A	1–2	Aizlewood (og)	8,155	15th
5 December 1981	Plymouth Argyle	H	0–0		6,949	15th
2 January 1982	Brentford	A	1–0	Fletcher	5,440	14th
9 January 1982	Oxford United	H	2–0	Cowling, Brown	7,070	9th
16 January 1982	Bristol City	A	0–0		4,921	8th
30 January 1982	Burnley	H	1–2	Cowling	10,629	12th
6 February 1982	Wimbledon	A	0–2		2,499	16th
9 February 1982	Preston North End	H	2–3	Fletcher (2)	6,674	16th
13 February 1982	Reading	H	6–1	Fletcher (2), Lillis, Hicks (og), Cowling, Stanton	6,022	13th
16 February 1982	Walsall	A	1–1	Austin	3,362	14th
20 February 1982	Chester	A	1–2	Purdie	3,120	15th
27 February 1982	Fulham	H	2–2	Austin, Stanton	5,963	15th
2 March 1982	Lincoln City	H	0–2		5,874	15th
6 March 1982	Gillingham	H	2–0	Robins, Fletcher	5,338	15th
9 March 1982	Carlisle United	A	2–2	Robins, Lillis	3,643	13th
13 March 1982	Bristol Rovers	H	0–2		6,156	16th
23 March 1982	Chesterfield	H	1–1	Lillis	6,721	17th
27 March 1982	Doncaster Rovers	H	1–2	Hanvey	6,871	18th
30 March 1982	Newport County	H	2–0	Kennedy (pen), Hotte	4,205	16th
3 April 1982	Swindon Town	A	5–1	Hanvey, Hotte (2), Cowling, Kennedy	3,872	14th
6 April 1982	Millwall	A	3–1	Lillis, Cowling, Wilson	3,507	12th
10 April 1982	Walsall	H	2–1	Cowling, Hotte	6,572	12th
12 April 1982	Lincoln City	A	0–2		8,203	13th
17 April 1982	Plymouth Argyle	A	1–1	Kennedy (pen)	5,434	12th
24 April 1982	Portsmouth	H	0–1		5,658	13th
1 May 1982	Southend United	A	0–4		4,470	16th
4 May 1982	Bristol City	H	5–0	Boyle (og), Cowling, Robins, Stanton, Wilson	3,468	14th
8 May 1982	Brentford	H	1–1	Valentine	4,542	14th
12 May 1982	Exeter City	A	0–1		2,888	15th
15 May 1982	Newport County	A	0–1		4,169	16th

=== FA Cup ===
Date	Round	Opponents	Home/ Away	Result F–A	Scorers	Attendance
21 November 1981	Round 1	Workington	A	1–1	Brown	3,101
24 November 1981	Round 1 Replay	Workington	H	5–0	Robins, Lillis, Laverick (2), Brown	7,305
12 December 1981	Round 2	Chesterfield	A	1–0	Cowling	8,609
23 January 1982	Round 3	Carlisle United	A	3–2	Fletcher (3)	6,345
26 January 1982	Round 4	Orient	H	1–1	Austin	13,623
1 February 1982	Round 4 Replay	Orient	A	0–2		6,478

=== Milk Cup ===
Date	Round	Opponents	Home/ Away	Result F–A	Scorers	Attendance
1 September 1981	Round 1 1st Leg	Rochdale	H	3–1	Fletcher (2), Wilson	6,713
15 September 1981	Round 1 2nd Leg	Rochdale	A	4–2	Fletcher (2), Robins, Kindon	3,735: Huddersfield won 7–3 on aggregate.
6 October 1981	Round 2 1st Leg	Brighton & Hove Albion	H	1–0	Austin	9,803
27 October 1981	Round 2 2nd Leg	Brighton & Hove Albion	A	0–2		14,192: Huddersfield lost 2–1 on aggregate.

== Appearances and goals ==
Name	Nationality	Position	League		FA Cup		League Cup		Total	
Name	Nationality	Position	Apps	Goals	Apps	Goals	Apps	Goals	Apps	Goals
Terry Austin	England	FW	20 (1)	2	5	1	2 (2)	1	27 (3)	4
Graham Bell	England	MF	2	0	0	0	0	0	2	0
Malcolm Brown	England	DF	46	1	6	2	4	0	56	3
David Burke	England	DF	41	1	4	0	4	0	49	1
David Cowling	England	MF	36 (2)	8	6	1	1 (1)	0	43 (3)	9
Brian Cox	England	GK	14	0	0	0	0	0	14	0
Peter Fletcher	England	FW	22 (4)	7	4 (1)	3	3	4	29 (5)	14
Keith Hanvey	England	DF	43	4	6	0	3	0	52	4
Tim Hotte	England	FW	13 (1)	4	0	0	0	0	13 (1)	4
Mick Kennedy	England	MF	39	7	4	0	4	0	47	7
Steve Kindon	England	FW	10	3	0	0	3	1	13	4
Mick Laverick	England	MF	4	3	2	2	0	0	6	5
Mark Lillis	England	MF	42	5	6	1	4	0	52	6
Bernard Purdie	Wales	DF	11 (4)	1	2 (2)	0	2	0	15 (6)	1
Andy Rankin	England	GK	19	0	0	0	4	0	23	0
Ian Robins	England	FW	26 (6)	7	3 (1)	1	3	1	32 (7)	9
Steve Smith	England	DF	0	0	1	0	0	0	1	0
Brian Stanton	England	MF	31	3	4	0	0	0	35	3
Dave Sutton	England	DF	29	0	6	0	4	0	39	0
Dick Taylor	England	GK	13	0	6	0	0	0	19	0
Peter Valentine	England	DF	14	1	0	0	0	0	14	1
Phil Wilson	England	MF	31 (3)	2	1	0	4	1	36 (3)	3
