= 1977–78 Huddersfield Town A.F.C. season =

Huddersfield Town
1977–78 season
- Chairman: Keith Longbottom
- Manager: John Haselden (until 29 September 1977); Tom Johnston (from 29 September 1977)
- Stadium: Leeds Road
- Football League Fourth Division: 11th
- FA Cup: First round (eliminated by Barnsley)
- Football League Cup: Second round (eliminated by Coventry City)
- Top goalscorer: League: Mick Butler (17); All: Mick Butler (19)
- Highest home attendance: 8,577 vs Coventry City (30 August 1977)
- Lowest home attendance: 1,638 vs AFC Bournemouth (29 April 1978)
- Biggest win: 4–1 vs Doncaster Rovers (1 October 1977); 3–0 vs Wimbledon (17 December 1977); 4–1 vs Scunthorpe United (31 December 1977); 3–0 vs Crewe Alexandra (25 March 1978)
- Biggest defeat: 0–2 vs Newport County (27 August 1977); 0–2 vs Watford (10 September 1977); 1–3 vs Northampton Town (27 September 1977); 1–3 vs Grimsby Town (29 October 1977); 1–3 vs Brentford (1 April 1978); 0–2 vs Wimbledon (8 April 1978); 0–2 vs Reading (15 April 1978)

Huddersfield Town's 1977–78 campaign is statistically Huddersfield Town's worst season since entering the Football League in 1910. Town finished 11th in the 4th Division. Under John Haselden and then Tom Johnston Town would stay in the 4th Division for a fourth successive season.

== Squad at the start of the season ==
Note: Flags indicate national team as defined under FIFA eligibility rules; some limited exceptions apply. Players may hold more than one non-FIFA nationality.

Pos.	Nation	Player
GK	ENG	Alan Starling
GK	ENG	Dick Taylor
DF	ENG	Steve Baines
DF	ENG	Malcolm Brown
DF	ENG	Phil Sandercock
DF	ENG	Arnie Sidebottom
DF	SCO	Alan Sweeney
MF	ENG	Terry Armstrong
MF	ENG	Martin Fowler

Pos.	Nation	Player
MF	ENG	Peter Hart
MF	NIR	Johnny Jameson
MF	ENG	Kevin Johnson
MF	ENG	Jim McCaffrey
FW	ENG	Mick Butler
FW	ENG	Terry Eccles
FW	ENG	Wayne Goldthorpe
FW	ENG	Terry Gray
FW	ENG	Peter Howey

== Review ==
After two seasons in the basement division of the Football League, some Town fans were wondering if Town were ever going to get back into at least the Third Division. Town reverted to their blue and white striped kit, after two years in the all-blue kit. But, at the start of the season, it seemed to be a curse, with Town winning none of their first eight matches, which unsurprisingly saw John Haselden get demoted to coach, which saw Tom Johnston return to the hotseat at Leeds Road for a record third time. Town went on a six match unbeaten run, but then Town seemed to go for the rest on the season in a complete mix of mediocrity.

Town's top scorers for the season were Mick Butler on 19 goals, Terry Gray on 11 and then Kevin Johnson on 10. By the end of the season, both Butler and Johnson left Leeds Road for pastures new. Town finished 11th with just 45 points, finishing only four points above Halifax Town, who were in 20th place.

== Squad at the end of the season ==
Note: Flags indicate national team as defined under FIFA eligibility rules; some limited exceptions apply. Players may hold more than one non-FIFA nationality.

Pos.	Nation	Player
GK	ENG	Alan Starling
GK	ENG	Dick Taylor
DF	ENG	Jim Branagan
DF	ENG	Malcolm Brown
DF	ENG	Paul Gartland
DF	ENG	Brett Mellor
DF	ENG	Phil Sandercock
DF	ENG	Arnie Sidebottom
DF	ENG	Dave Sutton
DF	SCO	Alan Sweeney
MF	ENG	Terry Armstrong

Pos.	Nation	Player
MF	ENG	Martin Fowler
MF	ENG	Peter Hart
MF	ENG	Ian Holmes
MF	NIR	Johnny Jameson
MF	ENG	Kevin Johnson
FW	ENG	Mick Butler
FW	ENG	Terry Eccles
FW	ENG	Wayne Goldthorpe
FW	ENG	Terry Gray
FW	ENG	Peter Howey

== Results ==
=== Division Four ===
Date	Opponents	Home/ Away	Result F–A	Scorers	Attendance	Position
20 August 1977	Swansea City	H	0–0		4,435	15th
27 August 1977	Newport County	A	0–2		3,367	21st
3 September 1977	Aldershot	H	1–1	Johnson	4,205	19th
10 September 1977	Watford	A	0–2		7,852	20th
13 September 1977	Torquay United	H	1–1	Goldthorpe (pen)	3,692	21st
17 September 1977	Stockport County	H	0–0		3,740	22nd
24 September 1977	York City	A	1–1	Gray	2,595	21st
27 September 1977	Northampton Town	A	1–3	Gray	3,942	23rd
1 October 1977	Doncaster Rovers	H	4–1	Gray, Butler, Baines, Armstrong	4,592	19th
4 October 1977	Hartlepool United	H	3–1	Johnson (2, 1 pen), Butler	3,960	12th
8 October 1977	Halifax Town	A	0–0		4,300	14th
15 October 1977	Darlington	A	2–2	Baines, Johnson	2,825	16th
17 October 1977	Rochdale	A	0–0		2,489	13th
22 October 1977	Barnsley	H	2–0	Eccles (2)	7,583	12th
29 October 1977	Grimsby Town	H	1–3	Holmes	5,871	14th
5 November 1977	Scunthorpe United	A	1–1	Gray	3,211	15th
19 November 1977	Reading	A	0–1		4,278	17th
2 December 1977	Southport	H	3–1	Holmes, Eccles, Butler	3,079	16th
10 December 1977	Bournemouth	A	0–1		3,249	17th
17 December 1977	Wimbledon	H	3–0	Holmes, Baines, Butler	3,544	15th
26 December 1977	Southend United	H	2–0	Gray, Mountford	5,707	13th
27 December 1977	Crewe Alexandra	A	1–1	Johnson	3,177	11th
31 December 1977	Scunthorpe United	H	4–1	Butler (3, 1 pen), Mountford	5,104	10th
2 January 1978	Brentford	A	1–1	Baines	9,470	10th
7 January 1978	Rochdale	H	3–1	Butler, Mountford (2)	5,486	9th
14 January 1978	Swansea City	A	0–1		5,906	10th
21 January 1978	Newport County	H	2–0	Butler, Gray	4,894	8th
28 January 1978	Aldershot	A	3–3	Butler (3)	4,062	10th
25 February 1978	Doncaster Rovers	A	3–4	Johnson (2), Sandercock	4,712	12th
27 February 1978	Stockport County	A	1–0	Johnson	6,177	9th
4 March 1978	Halifax Town	H	2–2	Johnson (2, 1 pen)	6,571	10th
8 March 1978	Torquay United	A	1–2	Butler	2,663	11th
11 March 1978	Darlington	H	2–1	Sidebottom, Butler	4,481	10th
14 March 1978	Watford	H	1–0	Gray	6,603	7th
18 March 1978	Barnsley	A	1–1	Gray	8,492	8th
24 March 1978	Grimsby Town	A	0–1		7,718	10th
25 March 1978	Crewe Alexandra	H	3–0	Gray, Butler, Holmes	4,500	7th
27 March 1978	Southend United	A	3–1	Howey, Holmes, Butler	8,198	6th
1 April 1978	Brentford	A	1–3	Butler	6,345	8th
4 April 1978	Northampton Town	H	0–1		3,488	8th
8 April 1978	Wimbledon	A	0–2		2,602	8th
11 April 1978	York City	H	1–2	Gray	2,037	8th
15 April 1978	Reading	H	0–2		2,130	9th
22 April 1978	Southport	A	1–1	Goldthorpe	1,465	10th
25 April 1978	Hartlepool United	A	2–3	Holmes (pen), Brown	1,926	12th
29 April 1978	Bournemouth	H	2–0	Goldthorpe, Holmes (pen)	1,638	11th

=== FA Cup ===
Date	Round	Opponents	Home/ Away	Result F–A	Scorers	Attendance
26 November 1977	Round 1	Barnsley	A	0–1		9,579

=== Football League Cup ===
Date	Round	Opponents	Home/ Away	Result F–A	Scorers	Attendance
13 August 1977	Round 1 1st Leg	Carlisle United	H	1–1	Eccles	3,774
16 August 1977	Round 1 2nd Leg	Carlisle United	A	2–2	Butler (2)	5,447: 3–3 on aggregate.
23 August 1977	Round 1 Replay	Carlisle United	H	2–1	Eccles, Gray	4,542
30 August 1977	Round 2	Coventry City	H	0–2		8,577

== Appearances and goals ==
Name	Nationality	Position	League		FA Cup		League Cup		Total	
Name	Nationality	Position	Apps	Goals	Apps	Goals	Apps	Goals	Apps	Goals
Terry Armstrong	England	FW	17 (2)	1	0	0	0	0	17 (2)	1
Steve Baines	England	DF	29	4	1	0	4	0	34	4
Jim Branagan	England	DF	24	0	0	0	0	0	24	0
Malcolm Brown	England	DF	30	1	1	0	4	0	35	1
Mick Butler	England	MF	41 (2)	17	1	0	4	2	46 (2)	19
Terry Eccles	England	FW	24 (5)	3	1	0	4	2	29 (5)	5
Martin Fowler	England	MF	5 (3)	0	0	0	0	0	5 (3)	0
Paul Gartland	England	DF	1	0	0	0	0	0	1	0
Wayne Goldthorpe	England	FW	8 (3)	3	0	0	0	0	8 (3)	3
Terry Gray	England	FW	45	10	1	0	4	1	50	11
Peter Hart	England	MF	41	0	1	0	4	0	46	0
Ian Holmes	England	MF	28 (1)	7	1	0	0	0	29 (1)	7
Peter Howey	England	MF	7 (2)	1	0	0	4	0	11 (2)	1
Johnny Jameson	Northern Ireland	MF	1	0	0	0	0	0	1	0
Kevin Johnson	England	FW	42 (1)	10	1	0	4	0	47 (1)	10
Jim McCaffrey	England	MF	9 (3)	0	0 (1)	0	4	0	14 (4)	0
Brett Mellor	England	DF	1	0	0	0	0	0	1	0
Bob Mountford	England	FW	12 (2)	4	0	0	0	0	12 (2)	4
Phil Sandercock	England	DF	45	1	1	0	4	0	50	1
Arnie Sidebottom	England	DF	29	1	1	0	0	0	30	1
Alan Starling	England	GK	32	0	1	0	4	0	37	0
Dave Sutton	England	DF	14	0	0	0	0	0	14	0
Alan Sweeney	Scotland	DF	7 (1)	0	0	0	0	0	7 (1)	0
Dick Taylor	England	GK	14	0	0	0	0	0	14	0
