= Terry Armstrong =

English footballer (born 1958)

Personal information
- Full name: Terence Armstrong
- Date of birth: 10 July 1958 (age 68)
- Place of birth: Barnsley, England
- Height: 5 ft 10 in (1.78 m)
- Position: Midfielder

Senior career*
Years	Team	Apps	(Gls)
1976–1980	Huddersfield Town	40	(2)
1980–1985	Port Vale	115	(12)
- Nuneaton Borough
- Northwich Victoria
Total		155+	(14+)
- * Club domestic league appearances and goals

Terence Armstrong (born 10 July 1958) is an English former footballer who played as a midfielder for Huddersfield Town and Port Vale in a nine-year career in the Football League. He helped Port Vale to win promotion out of the Fourth Division in 1982–83. He later played non-League football for Nuneaton Borough and Northwich Victoria.

== Career ==
Armstrong played for Huddersfield Town, and made four Fourth Division appearances in the 1976–77 season. He made 19 appearances in the 1977–78 season, and scored once in a 4–1 win over Doncaster Rovers at Leeds Road on 1 October. Manager Tom Johnston was then replaced by Mick Buxton. However, Armstrong continued to make progress in the first-team, starting 15 league games in 1978–79 and scoring once in a 2–1 home win over AFC Bournemouth on 13 March. However, he did not feature at all in the title-winning 1979–80 campaign, and was also absent throughout the 1980–81 season, before signing with Fourth Division Port Vale in February 1981.

Armstrong made 17 appearances for the "Valiants" at the end of the 1980–81 campaign, and claimed goals against Hereford United and Peterborough United. He featured 42 times in the 1981–82 season, scoring goals against Hartlepool United and Lincoln City. He scored seven goals in 45 games in the 1982–83 promotion campaign, including a brace in a 4–1 win over Mansfield Town at Vale Park. However, he and numerous other players fell out with manager John McGrath over player wages, and as a result Armstrong, Barry Siddall, Russell Bromage, and Geoff Hunter all remained on weekly contracts. Armstrong hit two goals in 21 matches in the 1983–84 season as Vale were relegated out of the Third Division, despite an upturn in form under new boss John Rudge. Armstrong began to be plagued by a nagging knee injury, which required a cartilage operation. His injury kept him limited to just six appearances in the 1984–85 campaign, and he left the club on a free transfer to non-League Nuneaton Borough in May 1985, later moving on to Alliance Premier League rivals Northwich Victoria.

== Post-retirement ==
In April 2003, he lost his job as a prison warder at Wakefield Prison after he was jailed for 28 days for sending sexually explicit material to the husband of his former lover. This act was in breach of a restraining order. He also graffitied a motorway bridge as an insult to the husband of his former lover.

== Career statistics ==
Appearances and goals by club, season and competition
Club	Season	League			FA Cup		Other		Total	
Club	Season	Division	Apps	Goals	Apps	Goals	Apps	Goals	Apps	Goals
Huddersfield Town	1976–77	Fourth Division	4	0	0	0	0	0	4	0
Huddersfield Town	1977–78	Fourth Division	19	1	0	0	0	0	19	1
Huddersfield Town	1978–79	Fourth Division	17	1	0	0	0	0	17	1
Huddersfield Town	Total		40	2	0	0	0	0	40	2
Port Vale	1980–81	Fourth Division	17	2	0	0	0	0	17	2
Port Vale	1981–82	Fourth Division	33	1	5	1	3	0	41	2
Port Vale	1982–83	Fourth Division	42	7	1	0	2	0	45	7
Port Vale	1983–84	Third Division	19	2	1	0	1	0	21	2
Port Vale	1984–85	Fourth Division	4	0	0	0	2	0	6	0
Port Vale	Total		115	12	7	1	8	0	130	13
Career total			155	14	7	1	8	0	170	15

== Honours ==
Port Vale

- Football League Fourth Division third-place promotion: 1982–83
