= Bruce Rankin =

Bruce Rankin may refer to:

- Bruce Rankin (footballer), English footballer
- Bruce Irving Rankin, Canadian diplomat
