= Keith Ripley =

Keith Ripley may refer to:

- Keith Ripley (footballer, born 1935) (1935–2012), wing half for Leeds, Norwich, Peterborough, Mansfield Town and Doncaster Rovers
- Keith Ripley (footballer, born 1954), full back for Huddersfield Town and Doncaster Rovers
