= John Haselden =

English footballer (1943–2020)

Personal information
- Full name: John James Haselden
- Date of birth: 3 August 1943
- Place of birth: Doncaster, England
- Date of death: 30 March 2020 (aged 76)
- Height: 6 ft 0 in (1.83 m)
- Position: Central defender

Senior career*
Years	Team	Apps	(Gls)
1961–1968	Rotherham United	99	(0)
1968–1974	Doncaster Rovers	172	(20)
1971–1972	→ Mansfield Town (loan)	4	(0)
Total		275	(20)

Managerial career
- 1977: Huddersfield Town
- 1991: Reading (caretaker manager)
- * Club domestic league appearances and goals

John James Haselden (3 August 1943 – 30 March 2020) was an English professional footballer, manager and physiotherapist. As a player, he was a central defender.

== Playing career ==
Haselden played the professional game for 13 years and played for Doncaster Rovers, Rotherham United and had a loan spell at Mansfield Town.

=== Rotherham United ===
Haselden started his career at Rotherham United in 1961. He spent 7 years at Rotherham and played 99 games. He then moved to hometown club Doncaster Rovers in 1968.

=== Doncaster Rovers ===
Doncaster Rovers were Haselden's hometown club and he was to make 172 appearances in the next 6 years. He also scored 20 goals. He also had a loan spell at Mansfield between 1971 and 1972 where he played 4 games. In 1974, he retired from the game and joined Mansfield Town's coaching staff.

=== Reading ===
In 1987, Haselden had a run-out in a friendly at Reading, where he was working as a coach, at the age of 45.

== Coaching career ==
=== Mansfield Town ===
Haselden was Mansfield Town's First Team Coach and in his first season as coach Mansfield won the Fourth Division title.

=== Huddersfield Town ===
Haselden joined Huddersfield Town in early 1976 as a physiotherapist/coach under Tom Johnston. In April 1977, with Huddersfield's hopes of promotion now looking slim, the club's board of directors decided to make a change. They voted Johnston out of the manager's position and replaced him with Haselden. Johnston moved upstairs to General Manager and Haselden had the title of Team Manager. Haselden oversaw the remaining games of the 1976-77 season before he began planning for the following campaign.

In the pre-season of the 1977-78 season, Huddersfield won the Shipp Cup under Haselden's charge and debuted a new style of play, which saw the side playing out from the back. Results were not forthcoming and after slipping down to 91st in The Football League in September 1977, the board made another switch, with Haselden reverting to coach and Johnston returning as manager. Haselden was the club's shortest serving manager (lasting 160 days) until Danny Schofield was sacked in September 2022 after just 69 days in charge.

Johnston remained at the club until August 1978 and after he retired, fellow coach Mick Buxton took over as caretaker manager. When Buxton was given the role full-time in October, he made Haselden his assistant manager/physiotherapist and in their full season at the helm Town won the Fourth Division title. Town also gained promotion from Division Three in 1983. In the summer of 1986, Haselden was sacked for "economy reasons".

=== Reading ===
In 1986 Haselden joined Reading's coaching staff. He took caretaker charge of Reading in 1991 for a couple of weeks. He left Reading in 1993 to join Nottingham Forest.

==== Managerial statistics ====
As of 9 April 2009.

Team	From	To	Record				
Team	From	To	G	W	D	L	Win %
Huddersfield Town	22 April 1977	29 September 1977	14	0	5	8	0
Reading (caretaker manager)	30 April 1991	10 May 1991	4	1	3	0	25

=== Nottingham Forest ===
Haselden joined Forest as a physiotherapist where he worked for nine years before leaving to join Aston Villa in 2002. He left in 2004 for Notts County. He spent 4 years at Notts before being replaced by Paul Smith in July 2008.

== Honours ==
=== Player ===
Doncaster Rovers

- Fourth Division champions: 1968–69

=== Coach/physio ===
Mansfield Town

- Fourth Division champions: 1974–75

Huddersfield Town

- Third Division runners-up: 1982–83
- Fourth Division champions: 1979–80

Reading

- Simod Cup: 1987–88
