= Paul Bielby =

English footballer

Personal information
- Full name: Paul Anthony Bielby
- Date of birth: 24 November 1956 (age 69)
- Place of birth: Darlington, England
- Position: Winger

Senior career*
Years	Team	Apps	(Gls)
1973–1974	Manchester United	4	(0)
1975–1978	Hartlepool United	95	(8)
1978–1979	Huddersfield Town	31	(5)

International career
1975	England Youth	1	(0)
- * Club domestic league appearances and goals

Paul Anthony Bielby MBE (born 24 November 1956) is an English former footballer who played as a left winger. Born in Darlington, he played for Manchester United, Hartlepool United and Huddersfield Town.

He was appointed Member of the Order of the British Empire (MBE) in the 2008 New Year Honours for his services to young people.
