= Johnny Jameson =

Northern Ireland footballer

Personal information
- Full name: John Charles Jameson
- Date of birth: 11 March 1958 (age 68)
- Place of birth: Belfast, Northern Ireland
- Position: Midfielder

Senior career*
Years	Team	Apps	(Gls)
1975–1977	Bangor	?	(9)
1977–1978	Huddersfield Town	1	(0)
1978–1980	Linfield	?	(18)
1980–1994	Glentoran	?	(71)
- * Club domestic league appearances and goals

John Charles "Johnny" Jameson (born 11 March 1958, Belfast) is a former Northern Ireland international footballer who played for Glentoran.

During his club career he played for Bangor, Huddersfield Town, Linfield, and Glentoran. He was part of the team at the 1982 FIFA World Cup when Northern Ireland reached the second round. However, he did not earn any senior caps, as his deeply held religious beliefs restricted his international career as he refused to play on a Sunday.

Like a number of professional Northern Irish footballers Jameson hailed from Rathcoole, near Belfast.
