= Daryl Brook =

English footballer

Personal information
- Date of birth: 19 November 1960 (age 65)
- Place of birth: Holmfirth, England
- Position: Forward

Senior career*
Years	Team	Apps	(Gls)
1977–1980	Huddersfield Town	1	(0)
1980–1984	Emley	–	(–)
1984	Mossley	5	(0)
1984–1999	Emley		

Managerial career
- 2008: A.F.C. Emley (joint caretaker manager)
- * Club domestic league appearances and goals

Daryl Brook (born 19 November 1960) is a former professional footballer who played as a striker for Huddersfield Town, before becoming the coach of Emley.

== Playing career ==
=== Huddersfield Town ===
Daryl Brook began his career at Huddersfield Town, along with his brother Nicky Brook, in the youth ranks and then they both turned professional at the beginning of the 1978–79 season and they both appeared on the team photo for that season. It was this season when Daryl made his debut, it was on the second to last game of the season against Hartlepool United. He was to play his second game in the next game at Bootham Crescent against York City but he broke his leg before the match took place and he never played for Huddersfield again. Brook remained at Leeds Road until 1980 when he moved to Emley.

=== Emley ===
Brook was to start an on-off 25-year relationship with the Welfare Ground outfit, serving as player, coach, physio and caretaker manager. His first spell lasted until 1984 when he transferred to Mossley.

=== Mossley ===
Daryl Brook was to only make 5 appearances for Mossley and he returned to Emley in the same year, 1984.

=== Emley, 2nd Spell ===
Brook was to remain a player until he became coach for the 1987–88 season. He had a testimonial year in 1999. He became physiotherapist at Emley in either the late 1990s or 2000s. He left the club, although remained supporter, in the 2000s. He returned in March 2008 to become caretaker manager along with Nicky Bramald following Ray Dennis's resignation. He remained joint- caretaker manager until the end of the season.

As of 2010, Brook is a builder in Shepley, Huddersfield and he has his own business, Daryl Brook Builders.
