= Neil Freeman (English footballer) =

English footballer

Personal information
- Full name: Neil Freeman
- Date of birth: 16 February 1955 (age 71)
- Place of birth: Northampton, England
- Height: 6 ft 2 in (1.88 m)
- Position: Goalkeeper

Youth career
- 1971–1972: Northampton Town

Senior career*
Years	Team	Apps	(Gls)
1972–1974	Arsenal	0	(0)
1974–1976	Grimsby Town	33	(0)
1976–1978	Southend United	69	(0)
1978–1981	Birmingham City	31	(0)
1980	→ Walsall (loan)	8	(0)
1981	→ Huddersfield Town (loan)	18	(0)
1981–1982	Peterborough United	41	(0)
1982–1983	Northampton Town	22	(0)
- * Club domestic league appearances and goals

Neil Freeman (born 16 February 1955) is an English former footballer who played as a goalkeeper in the Football League. He started his career as a youth player at home-town club Northampton Town, but turned professional with Arsenal in 1972. He was released in March 1974 without having played for the first team. He then played for Grimsby Town, Southend United, Birmingham City, Walsall, Huddersfield Town, Peterborough United and Northampton Town.

After retiring from football, he joined the police.
