= Peter Valentine =

English footballer

Personal information
- Full name: Peter Valentine
- Date of birth: 16 April 1963 (age 63)
- Place of birth: Huddersfield, England
- Height: 5 ft 10 in (1.78 m)
- Position: Centre back

Youth career
- Huddersfield Town

Senior career*
Years	Team	Apps	(Gls)
1981–1983	Huddersfield Town	19	(1)
1983–1985	Bolton Wanderers	68	(1)
1985–1993	Bury	319	(16)
1993–1995	Carlisle United	29	(2)
1995–1996	Rochdale	50	(2)
Total		485	(22)
- * Club domestic league appearances and goals

Peter Valentine (born 16 April 1963) is an English former professional footballer who made nearly 500 appearances in the Football League playing as a centre back for Huddersfield Town, Bolton Wanderers, Bury, Carlisle United and Rochdale.
