= Steve Kindon =

English footballer

Personal information
- Full name: Stephen Michael Kindon
- Date of birth: 17 December 1950 (age 75)
- Place of birth: Warrington, England
- Positions: Midfielder; striker

Senior career*
Years	Team	Apps	(Gls)
1968–1972	Burnley	109	(28)
1972–1977	Wolverhampton Wanderers	138	(28)
1977–1979	Burnley	76	(18)
1979–1982	Huddersfield Town	73	(35)
- * Club domestic league appearances and goals

Stephen Michael Kindon (born 17 December 1950) is a former professional footballer who played mainly on the left wing but also at centre forward. He was noted for his pace, and won "the Fastest Footballer in Britain award" seven times.

Kindon was born in Warrington and began his career at Burnley where he played over 100 games and scored 28 goals. "The Tank" moved to Wolverhampton Wanderers in 1972, where his bustling style made him a crowd favourite. He scored 31 goals in over 150 league and cup appearances for Wolves.

In 1977, he returned to Burnley before moving to Huddersfield Town where he was part of a minor piece of football history, being one of three goalkeepers used in an FA Cup Tie v Shrewsbury Town in 1981. Regular goalkeeper Andy Rankin was injured and Kindon took his place, only to be injured himself, his place in turn being taken by Mark Lillis. Each of them conceded a goal, and this remains an English record for the number of keepers used in one game. Injury then ended his career in 1982. Kindon was an England Youth, Under-23 and "B" international. He is now an after-dinner speaker.

== Honours ==
Huddersfield Town

- Football League Fourth Division: 1979–80
