= Mick Kennedy =

English footballer (1961–2019)

Personal information
- Full name: Michael Francis Martin Kennedy
- Date of birth: 9 April 1961
- Place of birth: Salford, England
- Date of death: 9 February 2019 (aged 57)
- Height: 5 ft 10 in (1.78 m)
- Position: Midfielder

Senior career*
Years	Team	Apps	(Gls)
1978–1980	Halifax Town	76	(4)
1980–1982	Huddersfield Town	81	(9)
1982–1984	Middlesbrough	68	(5)
1984–1987	Portsmouth	129	(4)
1987–1988	Bradford City	45	(2)
1988–1989	Leicester City	9	(0)
1989–1990	Luton Town	32	(0)
1990–1992	Stoke City	52	(3)
1992–1993	Chesterfield	27	(1)
1993–1994	Wigan Athletic	17	(1)
Total		535	(29)

International career
1986	Republic of Ireland	2	(0)
1982–1985	Republic of Ireland U-21	4	(2)
- * Club domestic league appearances and goals

Michael Francis Martin Kennedy (9 April 1961 – 9 February 2019) was a professional footballer who played in the English Football League for Halifax Town, Huddersfield Town, Middlesbrough, Portsmouth, Bradford City, Leicester City, Luton Town, Chesterfield and Wigan Athletic. Born in England, he gained two caps for Ireland during his career. Throughout his career he was renowned for his tough style of play which often left him with a poor disciplinary record.

== Club career ==
Kennedy was born in Salford and began his career with Halifax Town making his debut in 1978–79 as the Shaymen had a poor campaign finishing in 23rd position. The 1979–80 season saw Halifax make a marginal improvement finishing in 18th place. Kennedy impressed enough with Halifax to earn a £50,000 move to Third Division Huddersfield Town. His first season at Leeds Road was a frustrating one as Huddersfield missed out on promotion by three points. In the summer of 1982 he moved to Second Division Middlesbrough for a fee of £100,000. He spent two seasons at Ayresome Park making 79 appearances before moving on again this time to south coast side Portsmouth. Pompey finished 4th in both 1984–85 and 1985–86 missing out on promotion by goal difference and then three points before finally going up in 1986–87. However, with Portsmouth having financial problems he joined Bradford City in January 1988.

After two seasons at Bradford, Kennedy had short spells with Leicester City and Luton Town before joining his old Portsmouth manager Alan Ball at Stoke City for £250,000. He made 39 appearances for Stoke in 1990–91 scoring three goals in a poor season which saw Stoke finish in their lowest ever league position of 14th in the third tier. Under the management of Lou Macari in 1991–92 Kennedy played in 26 games and was released at the end of the season. He then went on to play a season each at Chesterfield and Wigan Athletic.

== International career ==
Kennedy earned his two international caps in the Iceland Triangular Tournament in May 1986. The competition held in Reykjavík, Iceland, with the Republic of Ireland and Czechoslovakia joining the hosts in a three team competition. Ireland beat Iceland 2–1 and Czechoslovakia 1–0 to win the trophy. Although Kennedy played well in both games, even hitting the post against Iceland with a great volley, he was never selected by Jack Charlton again. The reason being that the Manager was asked by the Czechs what he was going to do about Kennedy elbowing one of their players in the mouth when he visited their dressing room after the game "with his teeth all knocked". He never picked him again partly for this reason but also because in Tony Galvin and Kevin Sheedy he had two players who could do a better job.

== Honours ==
Portsmouth

- Football League Second Division runner-up: 1986–87

Republic of Ireland

- Iceland Triangular Tournament: 1986

== Career statistics ==
=== Club ===
Appearances and goals by club, season and competition
Club	Season	League			FA Cup		League Cup		Other^{[A]}		Total	
Club	Season	Division	Apps	Goals	Apps	Goals	Apps	Goals	Apps	Goals	Apps	Goals
Halifax Town	1978–79	Fourth Division	30	0	0	0	0	0	0	0	30	0
Halifax Town	1979–80	Fourth Division	46	4	6	1	2	0	0	0	52	5
Halifax Town	Total		76	4	6	1	2	0	0	0	84	5
Huddersfield Town	1980–81	Third Division	42	2	4	0	2	0	0	0	48	2
Huddersfield Town	1981–82	Third Division	39	7	4	0	4	0	0	0	47	7
Huddersfield Town	Total		81	9	8	0	6	0	0	0	95	9
Middlesbrough	1982–83	Second Division	38	5	4	0	2	0	0	0	44	5
Middlesbrough	1983–84	Second Division	30	0	3	0	2	0	0	0	35	0
Middlesbrough	Total		68	5	7	0	4	0	0	0	79	5
Portsmouth	1984–85	Second Division	37	0	2	1	3	0	0	0	42	1
Portsmouth	1985–86	Second Division	39	2	1	0	5	0	2	0	47	2
Portsmouth	1986–87	Second Division	35	2	1	0	3	0	3	0	42	2
Portsmouth	1987–88	First Division	18	0	0	0	0	0	0	0	18	0
Portsmouth	Total		129	4	4	1	11	0	5	0	149	5
Bradford City	1987–88	Second Division	15	1	2	1	1	0	4	0	22	2
Bradford City	1988–89	Second Division	30	1	2	0	6	0	2	0	40	1
Bradford City	Total		45	2	4	1	7	0	6	0	62	3
Leicester City	1988–89	Second Division	9	0	0	0	0	0	0	0	9	0
Luton Town	1989–90	First Division	32	0	1	0	2	0	1	0	36	0
Stoke City	1990–91	Third Division	32	3	3	0	3	0	1	0	39	3
Stoke City	1991–92	Third Division	20	0	2	0	3	0	1	0	26	0
Stoke City	Total		52	3	5	0	6	0	2	0	65	3
Chesterfield	1992–93	Third Division	27	1	2	0	1	0	4	0	34	1
Wigan Athletic	1993–94	Third Division	17	1	1	0	0	0	0	0	18	1
Career Total			536	29	38	3	39	0	18	0	631	32

A. The "Other" column constitutes appearances and goals in the EFL Trophy, Football League play-offs, and Full Members Cup.

=== International ===
National team	Year	Apps	Goals
Republic of Ireland	1986	2	0
Total		2	0
