= Fred Robinson (footballer, born 1954) =

English footballer

Personal information
- Full name: Frederick James Robinson
- Date of birth: 29 December 1954 (age 71)
- Place of birth: Rotherham, England
- Position: Defender

Senior career*
Years	Team	Apps	(Gls)
1973–1975	Rotherham United	4	(0)
1975–1979	Doncaster Rovers	119	(3)
1979–1981	Huddersfield Town	72	(2)
- * Club domestic league appearances and goals

Frederick James Robinson (born 29 December 1954) is an English former professional footballer, who played in defence for Rotherham United, Doncaster Rovers and Huddersfield Town.

== Honours ==
Huddersfield Town

- Football League Fourth Division: 1979–80
