= Bernard Purdie (footballer) =

Welsh footballer (born 1949)

Personal information
- Full name: Bernard Charles Purdie
- Date of birth: 20 April 1949 (age 77)
- Place of birth: Wrexham, Wales
- Height: 5 ft 9 in (1.75 m)
- Position: Striker

Senior career*
Years	Team	Apps	(Gls)
1968–1970	Wrexham	10	(3)
1971–1973	Chester	63	(6)
1973–1980	Crewe Alexandra	213	(44)
1980–1982	Huddersfield Town	46	(1)
1982–1983	Crewe Alexandra	16	(0)
1983–?	Bangor City	?	(?)
- * Club domestic league appearances and goals as of 24 August 2018

Bernard Charles Purdie (born 20 April 1949 in Wrexham, Wales) is a former professional footballer who played as a striker for his hometown club Wrexham before making the short journey across the border to join English neighbours Chester in 1971.

He made an explosive start to his Chester career by scoring four times on his full home debut against Gillingham but was to struggle for goals after this. At the end of 1972–73 he was released by Chester along with Graham Clapham and Mick Hollis.

Purdie remained in professional football by joining Chester's Cheshire rivals Crewe Alexandra, for the first of two spells with the club. In between he helped Huddersfield Town win the Football League Division Four championship in 1979–80 after a £22,000 transfer.

After finishing his league career with Crewe in 1983, Purdie joined non-league side Bangor City and worked as a postman in Wrexham but is now retired.

== Honours ==
Huddersfield Town

- Football League Fourth Division: 1979–80
