= Chris Topping =

English footballer

Personal information
- Full name: Christopher Topping
- Date of birth: 6 March 1951 (age 75)
- Place of birth: Bubwith, England
- Position: Defender

Senior career*
| Years | Team | Apps | (Gls) |
| 1968–1978 | York City | 412 | (11) |
| 1978–1981 | Huddersfield Town | 43 | (1) |
| 1981–1982 | Scarborough | 16 | (0) |
- * Club domestic league appearances and goals

Christopher Topping (born 6 March 1951) is an English former footballer.

== Career ==
Born in Bubwith, East Riding of Yorkshire, Topping became York City's first ever apprentice professional in 1967. He made his league debut for York in a home game against Newport County on 28 December 1968, aged 17 years old. He signed fully professional terms with York in March 1969 and quickly established himself in the senior side.

== Honours ==
Huddersfield Town

- Football League Fourth Division: 1979–80
