= Bruce Rankin (footballer) =

English footballer

Personal information
- Full name: Bruce Rankin
- Date of birth: 5 July 1879
- Place of birth: Liverpool, England
- Date of death: 1954 (aged 74–75)
- Position: Winger

Senior career*
Years	Team	Apps	(Gls)
1898–1899	White Star Wanderers		
1899–1900	Kirkdale		
1900–1901	Tranmere Rovers		
1901–1906	Everton	37	(7)
1906–1907	West Bromwich Albion	29	(5)
1907	Manchester City	2	(0)
1907–1908	Luton Town		
1908	Egremont Social		
1908	Wrexham		
Total		68	(12)
- * Club domestic league appearances and goals

Bruce Rankin (5 July 1879–1954) was an English footballer who played in the Football League for Everton, Manchester City and West Bromwich Albion.
