= Alan Starling =

English footballer

Personal information
- Full name: Alan William Starling
- Date of birth: 2 April 1951 (age 75)
- Place of birth: Dagenham, England
- Height: 6 ft 1 in (1.85 m)
- Position: Goalkeeper

Youth career
- Luton Town

Senior career*
Years	Team	Apps	(Gls)
1969–1971	Luton Town	7	(0)
1970–1971	→ Torquay United (loan)	1	(0)
1971–1976	Northampton Town	238	(1)
1976–1980	Huddersfield Town	112	(0)
1983	Bradley Rangers		
1983	Bradford City	0	(0)
1984	Halifax Town	0	(0)
Total		358	(1)
- * Club domestic league appearances and goals as of 10:26, 27 October 2008 (UTC)

Alan William Starling (born 2 April 1951) was a professional footballer, who played as a goalkeeper for Luton Town, Torquay United, Northampton Town & Huddersfield Town.

== Playing career ==
Starling began his career as an apprentice with Luton Town, turning professional in April 1969 and making his league debut the following season. He joined Torquay United on loan in February 1971, playing just once, in a 4–0 defeat at home to Reading in place of regular keeper Andy Donnelly, before returning to Luton.

He moved to Northampton Town in June 1971 and went on to make over 200 appearances for the Cobblers. In April 1976 he scored a penalty in the penultimate game of the season, against Hartlepool United, ensuring that every regular player for Northampton that season has scored at least once. He also holds the record of the most minutes without conceding a goal for Northampton Town when he went 595 minutes unbeaten between 25 October and 29 November 1975.

In March 1977 he joined Huddersfield Town. He won the club's player of the year award in 1979.

== After football ==
After retiring as a player, he worked as a salesman before becoming a national account manager at a pharmaceutical company.

== Honours ==
Huddersfield Town

- Football League Fourth Division: 1979–80
