= Andy Rankin =

English footballer (1944–2023)

Personal information
- Full name: Andrew George Rankin
- Date of birth: 11 May 1944
- Place of birth: Bootle, England
- Date of death: 21 August 2023 (aged 79)
- Position: Goalkeeper

Youth career
- Everton

Senior career*
| Years | Team | Apps | (Gls) |
| 1963–1971 | Everton | 85 | (0) |
| 1971–1980 | Watford | 329 | (0) |
| 1980–1982 | Huddersfield Town | 71 | (0) |

International career
| | England U23 | 1 | (0) |
- * Club domestic league appearances and goals

Andrew George Rankin (11 May 1944 – 21 August 2023) was an English professional footballer who played in the Football League as a goalkeeper for Everton, Watford and Huddersfield Town. He also made an international appearance for the England under-23 team.

== Career ==
=== Club career ===
Rankin joined Everton as an amateur at the age of 17 whilst also a Liverpool City Police Cadet. He turned professional, and left the police, five months later. Rankin's debut appearance came in November 1963 in a 2-2 draw at Nottingham Forest.

The first ever penalty shootout in the European Cup took place at Goodison Park on 4 November 1970. It ended when Rankin saved a kick from Ludwig Müller of Borussia Mönchengladbach to give Everton a 4–3 win. Afterwards the Everton manager, Harry Catterick, commented: "I still say these penalties to decide a match are like a circus."

Rankin stayed with Everton until 1971, part of a squad that won the FA Cup in 1966 and the League Championship in 1970, but only made 85 league appearances as he was mostly kept out of the team by first choice goalkeeper Gordon West. His final appearance for the Toffees was in a 3–2 loss to Stoke City in the 1971 FA Cup third place match held at Selhurst Park.

Rankin joined Watford for a fee of £20,000, and in 1973 became the inaugural Watford Player of the Season, an accolade he would reclaim in the 1974–75 season. After over 300 games for the Hornets he joined Huddersfield Town in 1980, before retiring in 1982.

=== International career ===
Rankin made a single appearance for England Under-23, in a 3–2 win against Wales at the Racecourse Ground, Wrexham.

== Personal life ==
Rankin was born in Bootle, Lancashire and attended Bootle Grammar School. His grandfather, Bruce Rankin, and cousin, George Rankin, were both professional footballers who played for Everton. He died on 21 August 2023, at the age of 79.

== Honours ==
Huddersfield Town

- Football League Fourth Division: 1979–80
