= Tommy Smith (footballer, born 1959) =

English footballer (born 1959)

Personal information
- Full name: Thomas Edgar Smith
- Date of birth: 30 July 1959 (age 67)
- Place of birth: Wolverhampton, England
- Position: Striker

Senior career*
Years	Team	Apps	(Gls)
- Bromsgrove Rovers
1978	Sheffield United	3	(1)
1978–1979	Huddersfield Town	1	(0)
–	Emley		
- * Club domestic league appearances and goals

Thomas Edgar Smith (born 30 July 1959) is an English former professional footballer who played as a striker in the Football League for Sheffield United, and Huddersfield Town. Smith also played non-league football for Bromsgrove Rovers, and Emley.
