= Keith Ripley (footballer, born 1954) =

English footballer

Personal information
- Full name: Keith Anthony Ripley
- Date of birth: 10 September 1954 (age 72)
- Place of birth: Normanton, England
- Position: Full back

Senior career*
Years	Team	Apps	(Gls)
1975–1978	Gainsborough Trinity		
1978–1979	Huddersfield Town	5	(0)
1979–1980	Doncaster Rovers	5	(0)
–	Gainsborough Trinity		
- * Club domestic league appearances and goals

Keith Anthony Ripley (born 10 October 1954) is an English former professional footballer, who played in the Football League as a full back for Huddersfield Town and Doncaster Rovers.

== Playing career ==
Ripley joined Gainsborough Trinity as an amateur in March 1975, having previously played for Bradford City's reserve side.

Ripley signed for Huddersfield Town in August 1978 by manager Tom Johnstone, however a few months later Johnston was sacked and replaced by Mick Buxton and only played one more game before being signed by Billy Bremner at Barnsley.

== Personal life ==
He is the son of Keith Ripley, who was also a footballer, and played in the Football League for Leeds United and Peterborough United amongst others.
