= Peter Howey =

English footballer (born 1958)

Personal information
- Date of birth: 23 January 1958 (age 68)
- Place of birth: Kinsley, Pontefract, England
- Height: 5 ft 4 in (1.63 m)
- Position: Midfielder

Senior career*
Years	Team	Apps	(Gls)
1977–1979	Huddersfield Town	22	(3)
- Newport County
?–1981	Frickley Athletic		
1981–1983	Scarborough		
1983–?	Frickley Athletic		
- * Club domestic league appearances and goals

Peter Howey (born 23 January 1958) is an English former professional footballer, who played for Huddersfield Town, Newport County, Scarborough & Frickley Athletic.
