= Paul Gartland =

English footballer

Personal information
- Date of birth: 8 February 1959 (age 67)
- Place of birth: Shipley, Bradford, England
- Position: Defender

Youth career
- Huddersfield Town

Senior career*
Years	Team	Apps	(Gls)
1976–1979	Huddersfield Town	8	(0)
1979–1987	Guiseley		
1987–199–	Emley		
- * Club domestic league appearances and goals

Paul E. Gartland (born 8 February 1959 in Shipley, Bradford, England) is an English former professional footballer who played as a defender in the Football League for Huddersfield Town before moving into non-league football.
