= Micky Laverick =

English footballer

Personal information
- Full name: Michael George Laverick
- Date of birth: 13 March 1954 (age 72)
- Place of birth: Castle Eden, County Durham, England
- Position: Midfielder

Senior career*
Years	Team	Apps	(Gls)
1972–1976	Mansfield Town	89	(13)
1976–1979	Southend United	110	(18)
1979–1981	Huddersfield Town	74	(9)
1981–1983	York City	41	(6)
1982	→ Huddersfield Town (loan)	2	(0)
1982–1986	Boston United	60	(13)
- * Club domestic league appearances and goals

Michael George Laverick (born 13 March 1954) is an English former footballer who played for Mansfield Town, Southend United, Huddersfield Town, York City and Boston United.

== Honours ==
Huddersfield Town

- Football League Fourth Division: 1979–80
