= Ian Robins =

English footballer (born 1952)

Personal information
- Date of birth: 22 February 1952 (age 74)
- Place of birth: Bury, England
- Height: 5 ft 9 in (1.75 m)
- Position: Striker

Youth career
- Oldham Athletic

Senior career*
Years	Team	Apps	(Gls)
1969–1977	Oldham Athletic	220	(40)
1977–1979	Bury	49	(5)
1978–1982	Huddersfield Town	156	(59)
Total		425	(104)
- * Club domestic league appearances and goals

Ian Robins (born 22 February 1952) is a former professional footballer who played for Oldham Athletic, Bury and Huddersfield Town. He joined Oldham as an apprentice in August 1967.

== Honours ==
Huddersfield Town

- Football League Fourth Division: 1979–80
