= Peter Fletcher (footballer) =

English footballer

Personal information
- Date of birth: 2 December 1953 (age 72)
- Place of birth: Manchester, England
- Height: 6 ft 2 in (1.88 m)
- Position: Striker

Youth career
- 1969–1973: Manchester United

Senior career*
Years	Team	Apps	(Gls)
1973–1974	Manchester United	7	(0)
1974–1976	Hull City	36	(5)
1976–1978	Stockport County	51	(13)
1978–1982	Huddersfield Town	99	(36)
- * Club domestic league appearances and goals

Peter Fletcher (born 2 December 1953) is an English former footballer who played as a forward. Born in Manchester, he played in the Football League for Manchester United, Hull City, Stockport County and Huddersfield Town before retiring in 1982, at age 29.

Fletcher played mainly in the reserve team for Manchester United, before moving to Hull City as part of the deal that took Stuart Pearson to United for £200,000.

== Honours ==
Huddersfield Town

- Football League Fourth Division: 1979–80
