= Keith Hanvey =

English footballer

Personal information
- Date of birth: 18 January 1952 (age 74)
- Place of birth: Manchester, England
- Height: 6 ft 0 in (1.83 m)
- Position: Defender

Senior career*
Years	Team	Apps	(Gls)
1971–1972	Manchester City	1	(0)
1972–1973	Swansea City	11	(0)
1973–1977	Rochdale	121	(10)
1977–1978	Grimsby Town	54	(2)
1978–1984	Huddersfield Town	205	(14)
1984–1985	Rochdale	15	(0)
Total		407	(26)
- * Club domestic league appearances and goals

Keith Hanvey (born 18 January 1952) is an English retired professional footballer who played for Manchester City, Swansea City, Rochdale, Grimsby Town and Huddersfield Town. His Debut for Manchester City appearance, in a Texaco Cup match against Airdrie on 27 September 1971.

== Honours ==
Huddersfield Town

- Football League Fourth Division: 1979–80
