= Jim Branagan =

English footballer

Personal information
- Full name: James Patrick Stephen Branagan
- Date of birth: 3 July 1955 (age 71)
- Place of birth: Urmston, England
- Height: 5 ft 10 in (1.78 m)
- Position: Full back

Youth career
- Oldham Athletic

Senior career*
Years	Team	Apps	(Gls)
1973–1977	Oldham Athletic	27	(0)
1977	Cape Town City	9	(0)
1977–1979	Huddersfield Town	38	(0)
1979–1987	Blackburn Rovers	294	(5)
1987–1988	Preston North End	3	(0)
1988–1989	York City	42	(1)
1989–?	Chorley		
- * Club domestic league appearances and goals

Jim Branagan (born 3 July 1955) is an English former footballer who played in the Football League as a full back for Oldham Athletic, Huddersfield Town, Blackburn Rovers, Preston North End and York City, and also in South Africa for Cape Town City.

Born in Urmston, Lancashire, Branagan began his professional career at Oldham Athletic, aged 18. He retired in 1989, later working at a Tesco store in Pendleton, Lancashire.
