= Ian Holmes (footballer, born 1950) =

English footballer

Personal information
- Full name: Ian Michael Holmes
- Date of birth: 8 December 1950 (age 75)
- Place of birth: Wombwell, England
- Position: Midfielder

Youth career
- Sheffield United

Senior career*
Years	Team	Apps	(Gls)
1968–1973	Sheffield United	6	(0)
1973–1977	York City	159	(30)
1977–1979	Huddersfield Town	73	(21)
- Gainsborough Trinity
- * Club domestic league appearances and goals

Ian Michael Holmes (born 8 December 1950) is an English former professional footballer, born in Wombwell, Yorkshire, who played as a midfielder in the Football League for Sheffield United, York City and Huddersfield Town. Holmes was a regular member of the York City team that between 1974 and 1976 spent two seasons in the Football League Second Division, the highest status held in the club's history.
