= Malcolm Brown (English footballer) =

English footballer (born 1956)

Personal information
- Date of birth: 13 December 1956 (age 69)
- Place of birth: Salford, England
- Height: 6 ft 2 in (1.88 m)
- Position: Right back

Youth career
- –: Bury

Senior career*
Years	Team	Apps	(Gls)
1973–1977	Bury	11	(0)
1977–1983	Huddersfield Town	256	(16)
1983–1985	Newcastle United	39	(0)
1985–1989	Huddersfield Town	96	(1)
1989	Rochdale	11	(0)
1989–1991	Stockport County	71	(3)
1991–1992	Rochdale	18	(1)
- * Club domestic league appearances and goals

Malcolm Brown (born 13 December 1956) is a former professional footballer who made more than 500 appearances in the Football League in the 1970s and 1980s. He played as a right back for Bury, Huddersfield Town, where he spent the majority of his career, Newcastle United, Rochdale and Stockport County.

Brown began his career as an apprentice at Bury, before moving to Huddersfield Town in 1977, where he helped the club to two promotions during Mick Buxton's reign as manager. He eventually left for Newcastle United in 1983, but missed the whole of the 1983–84 promotion season because of injury. He returned to Huddersfield in 1985 for another four seasons, playing more than 400 games for the club in all. He finished his professional career with two spells at Rochdale either side of two seasons with Stockport County.

== Honours ==
Huddersfield Town

- Football League Fourth Division: 1979–80

Individual

- PFA Team of the Year: 1990–91 Fourth Division
