= Tom Johnston (footballer) =

Scottish footballer and manager (1918–1994)

Personal information
- Full name: Thomas Deans Johnston
- Date of birth: 30 December 1918
- Place of birth: Coldstream, Scotland
- Date of death: 27 November 1994 (aged 75)
- Place of death: Nottingham, England
- Position: Winger

Senior career*
Years	Team	Apps	(Gls)
–1938	St Bernard's		
1939–1940	Peterborough United	30	(23)
1944–1948	Nottingham Forest	64	(26)
1948–1956	Notts County	267	(88)

Managerial career
- Heanor Town
- 1958–1962: Rotherham United
- 1962–1964: Grimsby Town
- 1964–1968: Huddersfield Town
- 1968–1975: York City
- 1975: Huddersfield Town (general manager)
- 1975–1977: Huddersfield Town
- 1977: Huddersfield Town (general manager)
- 1977–1978: Huddersfield Town
- * Club domestic league appearances and goals

Thomas Deans Johnston (30 December 1918 – 27 November 1994) was a Scottish professional footballer and manager.

Johnston grew up in Kelso and began his senior career with Edinburgh side St Bernard's before moving south to join Peterborough United in late 1938. He guested for Bourne Town and Northampton Town during the Second World War and signed for Nottingham Forest upon its conclusion. He crossed the Trent to join Notts County in 1947 and played alongside Tommy Lawton.

Originally an inside forward, Johnston latterly developed into a goal-scoring outside left. Following his playing retirement he earned FA coaching qualifications and, in 1956, a coaching position with Birmingham City. His first managerial role was with non-league Heanor Town before a twenty-year career in charge of Rotherham, Grimsby, Huddersfield and York.

== Managerial statistics ==
Team	Nat	From	To	Record				
Team	Nat	From	To	G	W	L	D	Win %
Rotherham United	(England)	1 November 1958	1 July 1962	179	63	67	49	35.19
Grimsby Town	(England)	1 July 1962	31 October 1964	106	30	44	32	28.30
Huddersfield Town	(England)	1 October 1964	31 May 1968	164	71	53	40	43.29
York City	(England)	1 October 1968	6 January 1975	295	106	105	84	35.93
Huddersfield Town	(England)	23 December 1975	31 July 1977	73	31	20	22	42.46
Huddersfield Town	(England)	29 September 1977	1 October 1978	48	18	18	12	37.50

== Honours ==
=== As a manager ===
Rotherham United

- Football League Cup runner-up: 1960–61
