= Dave Sutton (footballer, born 1957) =

English footballer and manager

Personal information
- Full name: David William Sutton
- Date of birth: 21 January 1957 (age 69)
- Place of birth: Tarleton, England
- Height: 6 ft 1 in (1.85 m)
- Position: Defender

Senior career*
Years	Team	Apps	(Gls)
1973–1978	Plymouth Argyle	61	(0)
1977	→ Reading (loan)	9	(0)
1978–1985	Huddersfield Town	242	(11)
1985–1988	Bolton Wanderers	98	(4)
1988–1989	Rochdale	28	(2)
- * Club domestic league appearances and goals

David William Sutton (born 21 January 1957) is an English former professional footballer who played in the Football League for Plymouth Argyle, Reading, Huddersfield Town, Bolton Wanderers and Rochdale. He later became a manager.

Despite being born in Tarleton near Preston in Lancashire Sutton began as an apprentice with Plymouth Argyle. He made 61 appearances at centre half plus 9 on loan at Reading before a transfer to Huddersfield Town under Mick Buxton in 1978. This was a highly successful move as Sutton moved up with them from the Fourth Division to the top half of the Second in the early 1980s. Mick Buxton later listed him as one of his best ever signings. After six years and 242 appearances he moved to then Third Division Bolton Wanderers where he made 98 appearances over four seasons experiencing relegation through the play-offs in 1986/87, then promotion in 1987/88.

After his release that summer he signed for Rochdale as team captain and helped the club improve under Danny Bergara after a shaky start. However just after Christmas he was advised to give up playing or risk severe back problems. Bergara retained his services as club physio then he became caretaker-manager for three games (all defeats) before Terry Dolan was appointed. Dolan also kept him on and indeed offered him a position at Hull City when he changed clubs in 1990/91. Sutton was the only member of Dolan's team to decline the offer and became caretaker for the rest of the season which was effectively over.

Sutton was finally given a permanent appointment that summer and crucially, permission to spend the bulk of the £200,000 received from the sale of goalkeeper Keith Welch which meant a mass clear out and the arrival of players such as record signing Andy Flounders and inspirational defender Alan Reeves.

Sutton's adventurous style was a clear break from the defensive-minded Dolan and Rochdale just missed out on a play-off place in 1991/92. The following season they slipped back slightly. In 1993/94 Dale again missed out on the play-offs on the last day of the season.

Expensive signings such as Paul Williams and Darren Oliver had not been successful and Reeves and goalkeeper Martin Hodge left the club. Sutton did not replace them quickly enough and after a run of heavy defeats he left the club by mutual consent at the end of November 1994.

Despite being linked to a vacancy at Northampton Town Sutton's next job was as manager of ambitious non-league club Chorley F.C. He resigned the post after 18 months, citing work commitments with the market gardening business he ran in partnership with his father.

== Honours ==
Huddersfield Town

- Football League Fourth Division: 1979–80

Bolton Wanderers

- Associate Members' Cup runner-up: 1985–86
