= 1979–80 Football League =

81st season of the Football League

The Football League
- Season: 1979–80
- Champions: Liverpool

The 1979–80 season was the 81st completed season of The Football League.

Bob Paisley's Liverpool retained their league championship trophy after fighting off a determined challenge by Dave Sexton's Manchester United. Nottingham Forest failed to make a sustained title challenge but compensated for this by retaining the European Cup.

Bristol City and Bolton Wanderers were relegated after brief, uneventful spells in the First Division notable only because Bristol City’s relegation ends the last time South West England had a team in the top tier until Swindon Town's promotion to the Premier League in 1993. On the other hand, Derby County's relegation came just five years after they had been league champions.

Kevin Keegan ended his three-year spell with Hamburger SV in Germany and returned to England in a shock £400,000 move to Southampton. Lawrie McMenemy's new signing was the transfer surprise of the season. Keegan was the current European Footballer of the Year and rated as one of the best strikers in the world, while Southampton were still struggling to establish themselves as a First Division side. But this move showed that Southampton had ambition and were determined to compete with the best.

Leicester City, Sunderland and Birmingham City ended their relatively short spells in the Second Division and occupied the division's three promotion places. Going down were Fulham, Burnley and Charlton Athletic.

Grimsby Town, Blackburn Rovers and Sheffield Wednesday all achieved some long-awaited success by gaining promotion from the Third Division. Bury, Southend United, Mansfield Town and Wimbledon occupied the Third Division's relegation places.

Fallen giants Huddersfield Town and Portsmouth finally achieved some success by gaining promotion from the Fourth Division. Newport County achieved their first promotion since 1939 and Walsall were also promoted. Re-election results are given at the end of this article.

== Final league tables and results ==
The tables and results below are reproduced here in the exact form that they can be found at The Rec.Sport.Soccer Statistics Foundation website with home and away statistics separated.

== First Division ==
First Division
- Season: 1979–80
- Champions: Liverpool; 12th English title
- Relegated: Bristol City; Derby County; Bolton Wanderers
- European Cup: Liverpool; Nottingham Forest (as defending champions)
- UEFA Cup: Manchester United; Ipswich Town; Wolverhampton Wanderers
- Matches: 462
- Goals: 1,159 (2.51 per match)
- Top goalscorer: Phil Boyer (23 goals)
- Biggest home win: Ipswich Town 6–0 Manchester United (1 March 1980)
- Biggest away win: Brighton & Hove Albion 0–4 Arsenal (18 August 1979); West Bromwich Albion 1–5 Nottingham Forest (1 September 1979); Everton 0–4 Ipswich Town (9 February 1980); Norwich City 0–4 Wolverhampton Wanderers (23 February 1980)
- Highest scoring: Norwich City 3–5 Liverpool (9 February 1980)

Liverpool won the First Division title for the fourth time in five seasons, finishing two points above Manchester United, who had their best league campaign for more than a decade. Ipswich Town, Arsenal and Nottingham Forest completed the top five, with Forest also retaining the European Cup, while Arsenal were on the losing side in the finals of both the FA Cup and the European Cup Winners' Cup. Wolves, who finished sixth, won the League Cup.

Bolton Wanderers, Derby County and Bristol City were relegated to the Second Division.

Pos	Team	Pld	W	D	L	GF	GA	GD	Pts	Qualification or relegation
1	Liverpool (C)	42	25	10	7	81	30	+51	60	Qualification for the European Cup first round
2	Manchester United	42	24	10	8	65	35	+30	58	Qualification for the UEFA Cup first round
3	Ipswich Town	42	22	9	11	68	39	+29	53	Qualification for the UEFA Cup first round
4	Arsenal	42	18	16	8	52	36	+16	52	
5	Nottingham Forest	42	20	8	14	63	43	+20	48	Qualification for the European Cup first round (Note: Nottingham Forest qualified for the European Cup first round as the 1979–80 European Cup winners.)
6	Wolverhampton Wanderers	42	19	9	14	58	47	+11	47	Qualification for the UEFA Cup first round (Note: Wolverhampton Wanderers qualified for the UEFA Cup as the 1979–80 Football League Cup winners.)
7	Aston Villa	42	16	14	12	51	50	+1	46	
8	Southampton	42	18	9	15	65	53	+12	45	
9	Middlesbrough	42	16	12	14	50	44	+6	44	
10	West Bromwich Albion	42	11	19	12	54	50	+4	41	
11	Leeds United	42	13	14	15	46	50	−4	40	
12	Norwich City	42	13	14	15	58	66	−8	40	
13	Crystal Palace	42	12	16	14	41	50	−9	40	
14	Tottenham Hotspur	42	15	10	17	52	62	−10	40	
15	Coventry City	42	16	7	19	56	66	−10	39	
16	Brighton & Hove Albion	42	11	15	16	47	57	−10	37	
17	Manchester City	42	12	13	17	43	66	−23	37	
18	Stoke City	42	13	10	19	44	58	−14	36	
19	Everton	42	9	17	16	43	51	−8	35	
20	Bristol City (R)	42	9	13	20	37	66	−29	31	Relegation to the Second Division
21	Derby County (R)	42	11	8	23	47	67	−20	30	Relegation to the Second Division
22	Bolton Wanderers (R)	42	5	15	22	38	73	−35	25	Relegation to the Second Division

Source: World Football
Rules for classification: 1) Points; 2) Goal difference; 3) Goals scored
(C) Champions; (R) Relegated

=== Results ===
Home \ Away	ARS	AST	BOL	BHA	BRI	COV	CRY	DER	EVE	IPS	LEE	LIV	MCI	MUN	MID	NWC	NOT	SOU	STK	TOT	WBA	WOL
Arsenal		3–1	2–0	3–0	0–0	3–1	1–1	2–0	2–0	0–2	0–1	0–0	0–0	0–0	2–0	1–1	0–0	1–1	0–0	1–0	1–1	2–3
Aston Villa	0–0		3–1	2–1	0–2	3–0	2–0	1–0	2–1	1–1	0–0	1–3	2–2	0–3	0–2	2–0	3–2	3–0	2–1	1–0	0–0	1–3
Bolton Wanderers	0–0	1–1		0–2	1–1	1–1	1–1	1–2	1–1	0–1	1–1	1–1	0–1	1–3	2–2	1–0	1–0	2–1	2–1	2–1	0–0	0–0
Brighton & Hove Albion	0–4	1–1	3–1		0–1	1–1	3–0	2–0	0–0	2–0	0–0	1–4	4–1	0–0	2–1	2–4	1–0	0–0	0–0	0–2	0–0	3–0
Bristol City	0–1	1–3	2–1	2–2		1–0	0–2	0–2	2–1	0–3	2–2	1–3	1–0	1–1	3–1	2–3	1–1	0–1	0–0	1–3	0–0	2–0
Coventry City	0–1	1–2	3–1	2–1	3–1		2–1	2–1	2–1	4–1	3–0	1–0	0–0	1–2	2–0	2–0	0–3	3–0	1–3	1–1	0–2	1–3
Crystal Palace	1–0	2–0	3–1	1–1	1–1	0–0		4–0	1–1	4–1	1–0	0–0	2–0	0–2	1–2	0–0	1–0	0–0	0–1	1–1	2–2	1–0
Derby County	3–2	1–3	4–0	3–0	3–3	1–2	1–2		0–1	0–1	2–0	1–3	3–1	1–3	1–0	0–0	4–1	2–2	2–2	2–1	2–1	0–1
Everton	0–1	1–1	3–1	2–0	0–0	1–1	3–1	1–1		0–4	5–1	1–2	1–2	0–0	0–2	2–4	1–0	2–0	2–0	1–1	0–0	2–3
Ipswich Town	1–2	0–0	1–0	1–1	1–0	3–0	3–0	1–1	1–1		1–0	1–2	4–0	6–0	1–0	4–2	0–1	3–1	3–1	3–1	4–0	1–0
Leeds United	1–1	0–0	2–2	1–1	1–3	0–0	1–0	1–0	2–0	2–1		1–1	1–2	2–0	2–0	2–2	1–2	2–0	3–0	1–2	1–0	3–0
Liverpool	1–1	4–1	0–0	1–0	4–0	4–0	3–0	3–0	2–2	1–1	3–0		2–0	2–0	4–0	0–0	2–0	1–1	1–0	2–1	3–1	3–0
Manchester City	0–3	1–1	2–2	3–2	3–1	3–0	0–0	3–0	1–1	2–1	1–1	0–4		2–0	1–0	0–0	1–0	0–1	1–1	1–1	1–3	2–3
Manchester United	3–0	2–1	2–0	2–0	4–0	2–1	1–1	1–0	0–0	1–0	1–1	2–1	1–0		2–1	5–0	3–0	1–0	4–0	4–1	2–0	0–1
Middlesbrough	5–0	0–0	3–1	1–1	1–0	1–2	1–1	3–0	2–1	1–1	3–1	1–0	3–0	1–1		1–0	0–0	0–1	1–3	0–0	2–1	1–0
Norwich City	2–1	1–1	2–1	2–2	2–0	1–0	2–1	4–2	0–0	3–3	2–1	3–5	2–2	0–2	0–0		3–1	2–1	2–2	4–0	1–1	0–4
Nottingham Forest	1–1	2–1	5–2	0–1	0–0	4–1	4–0	1–0	1–0	2–0	0–0	1–0	4–0	2–0	2–2	2–0		2–0	1–0	4–0	3–1	3–2
Southampton	0–1	2–0	2–0	5–1	5–2	2–3	4–1	4–0	1–0	0–1	1–2	3–2	4–1	1–1	4–1	2–0	4–1		3–1	5–2	1–1	0–3
Stoke City	2–3	2–0	1–0	1–0	1–0	3–2	1–2	3–2	2–3	0–1	0–2	0–2	0–0	1–1	0–0	2–1	1–1	1–2		3–1	3–2	0–1
Tottenham Hotspur	1–2	1–2	2–0	2–1	0–0	4–3	0–0	1–0	3–0	0–2	2–1	2–0	2–1	1–2	1–3	3–2	1–0	0–0	1–0		1–1	2–2
West Bromwich Albion	2–2	1–2	4–4	2–2	3–0	4–1	3–0	0–0	1–1	0–0	2–1	0–2	4–0	2–0	0–0	2–1	1–5	4–0	0–1	2–1		0–0
Wolverhampton Wanderers	1–2	1–1	3–1	1–3	3–0	0–3	1–1	0–0	0–0	3–0	3–1	1–0	1–2	3–1	0–2	1–0	3–1	0–0	3–0	1–2	0–0	

Updated to match(es) played on unknown. Source: Soccerbase
Legend: Blue = home team win; Yellow = draw; Red = away team win.

=== Managerial changes ===
Team	Outgoing manager	Manner of departure	Date of vacancy	Position in table	Incoming manager	Date of appointment
Derby County	(Scotland) Tommy Docherty	Resigned	20 May 1979	Pre-season	(England) Colin Addison	6 July 1979
Manchester City	(England) Tony Book	Became general manager	31 May 1979	Pre-season	(England) Malcolm Allison	31 May 1979
Bolton Wanderers	(England) Ian Greaves	Sacked	28 January 1980	22nd	(England) Stan Anderson	28 January 1980

=== Maps ===
Locations of the Football League First Division London teams 1979–1980
Locations of the Football League First Division 1979–1980 teams

== Second Division ==
Second Division
- Season: 1979–80
- Champions: Leicester City
- Promoted: Leicester City; Sunderland; Birmingham City
- Relegated: Fulham; Burnley; Charlton Athletic
- Cup Winners' Cup: West Ham United
- Matches: 462
- Goals: 1,162 (2.52 per match)
- Top goalscorer: Clive Allen (28 goals)
- Biggest home win: Queens Park Rangers 7–0 Burnley (27 October 1979)
- Biggest away win: Orient 0–4 West Ham United (1 January 1980); Charlton Athletic 0–4 Sunderland (15 March 1980)
- Highest scoring: Orient 3–7 Chelsea (10 November 1979)

Leicester City won the Second Division title for a record sixth time to reclaim their First Division status after a two-year exile. Birmingham City achieved an instant return to the elite in third place, while the final promotion place went to Sunderland.

Chelsea missed out on promotion on goal difference, while QPR weren't far behind. West Ham United's failure to win promotion at the second attempt was compensated for by victory in the FA Cup.

Charlton Athletic, Burnley and Fulham went down to the Third Division.

Pos	Team	Pld	W	D	L	GF	GA	GD	Pts	Qualification or relegation
1	Leicester City (C, P)	42	21	13	8	58	38	+20	55	Promotion to the First Division
2	Sunderland (P)	42	21	12	9	69	42	+27	54	Promotion to the First Division
3	Birmingham City (P)	42	21	11	10	58	38	+20	53	Promotion to the First Division
4	Chelsea	42	23	7	12	66	52	+14	53	
5	Queens Park Rangers	42	18	13	11	75	53	+22	49	
6	Luton Town	42	16	17	9	66	45	+21	49	
7	West Ham United	42	20	7	15	54	43	+11	47	Qualification for the Cup Winners' Cup first round (Note: West Ham United qualified for the Cup Winners' Cup first round as the 1979–80 FA Cup winners.)
8	Cambridge United	42	14	16	12	61	53	+8	44	
9	Newcastle United	42	15	14	13	53	49	+4	44	
10	Preston North End	42	12	19	11	56	52	+4	43	
11	Oldham Athletic	42	16	11	15	49	53	−4	43	
12	Swansea City	42	17	9	16	48	53	−5	43	
13	Shrewsbury Town	42	18	5	19	60	53	+7	41	
14	Orient	42	12	17	13	48	54	−6	41	
15	Cardiff City	42	16	8	18	41	48	−7	40	
16	Wrexham	42	16	6	20	40	49	−9	38	
17	Notts County	42	11	15	16	51	52	−1	37	
18	Watford	42	12	13	17	39	46	−7	37	
19	Bristol Rovers	42	11	13	18	50	64	−14	35	
20	Fulham (R)	42	11	7	24	42	74	−32	29	Relegation to the Third Division
21	Burnley (R)	42	6	15	21	39	73	−34	27	Relegation to the Third Division
22	Charlton Athletic (R)	42	6	10	26	39	78	−39	22	Relegation to the Third Division

Rules for classification: 1) Points; 2) Goal difference; 3) Goals scored
(C) Champions; (P) Promoted; (R) Relegated

=== Results ===
Home \ Away	BIR	BRR	BUR	CAM	CAR	CHA	CHE	FUL	LEI	LUT	NEW	NTC	OLD	ORI	PNE	QPR	SHR	SUN	SWA	WAT	WHU	WRE
Birmingham		1–1	2–0	1–0	2–1	1–0	5–1	3–4	1–2	1–0	0–0	3–3	2–0	3–1	0–0	2–1	1–0	2–0	1–0	2–0	0–0	2–0
Bristol Rovers	1–0		0–0	0–0	1–1	3–0	3–0	1–0	1–1	3–2	1–1	2–3	2–0	1–2	3–3	1–3	2–1	4–1	2–2	1–1	0–2	1–0
Burnley	0–0	1–1		5–3	0–2	1–1	0–1	2–1	1–2	0–0	3–2	0–1	1–1	1–2	1–1	0–3	0–0	0–0	1–1	1–0	0–1	1–0
Cambridge United	2–1	4–1	3–1		2–0	1–0	0–1	4–0	1–1	1–2	0–0	2–3	3–3	1–1	3–2	2–1	2–0	0–1	3–3	2–2	2–0	2–0
Cardiff City	1–2	0–1	2–1	0–0		3–1	1–2	1–0	0–1	2–1	1–1	3–2	1–0	0–0	0–2	1–0	1–0	1–1	1–1	1–0	0–1	1–0
Charlton Athletic	0–1	4–0	3–3	1–1	3–2		1–2	0–1	2–0	1–4	1–1	0–0	2–1	0–1	0–3	2–2	2–1	0–4	1–2	0–0	1–0	1–2
Chelsea	1–2	1–0	2–1	1–1	1–0	3–1		0–2	1–0	1–1	4–0	1–0	3–0	1–0	2–0	0–2	2–4	3–0	0–0	2–0	2–1	3–1
Fulham	3–4	1–1	3–1	1–2	2–1	1–0	1–2		0–0	1–3	1–0	1–3	0–1	0–0	1–0	0–2	2–1	1–2	0–1	0–0	1–2	0–2
Leicester City	2–1	3–0	1–1	2–1	0–0	2–1	1–0	3–3		1–3	1–0	1–0	0–1	2–2	1–2	2–0	2–0	1–1	2–1	2–0	1–2	2–0
Luton Town	2–3	3–1	1–1	1–1	1–2	3–0	3–3	4–0	0–0		1–1	2–1	0–0	2–1	1–1	1–1	0–0	5–0	2–0	1–0	1–1	2–0
Newcastle United	0–0	3–1	1–1	2–0	1–0	2–0	2–1	2–0	3–2	2–2		2–2	3–2	2–0	0–0	4–2	1–0	3–1	1–3	0–2	1–1	2–0
Notts County	1–1	0–0	2–3	0–0	4–1	0–0	2–3	1–1	0–1	0–0	2–2		1–1	1–1	2–1	1–0	5–2	0–0	0–1	1–2	0–1	2–0
Oldham Athletic	1–0	2–1	2–1	1–1	0–3	4–3	1–0	0–1	1–1	2–1	1–0	1–0		1–0	3–2	0–0	0–2	4–1	3–0	1–1	0–0	2–3
Orient	2–2	2–1	2–2	2–0	1–1	1–1	3–7	1–0	0–1	2–2	1–4	1–0	1–1		2–2	1–1	0–1	0–0	2–1	1–0	0–4	4–0
Preston North End	0–0	3–2	3–2	2–2	2–0	1–1	1–1	3–2	1–1	1–1	1–0	2–0	0–1	2–2		0–3	3–0	1–1	2–1	1–2	1–1	0–0
Queens Park Rangers	1–1	2–0	7–0	2–2	3–0	4–0	2–2	3–0	1–4	2–2	2–1	1–3	4–3	0–0	1–1		2–1	3–2	0–0	1–1	3–0	2–2
Shrewsbury Town	1–0	3–1	2–0	1–2	1–2	3–1	3–0	5–2	2–2	1–2	3–1	1–1	0–1	1–0	1–3	3–0		2–2	1–2	1–0	3–0	3–1
Sunderland	2–0	3–2	5–0	2–0	2–1	4–0	2–1	2–1	0–0	1–0	1–0	3–1	4–2	1–1	1–1	3–0	2–1		1–1	5–0	2–0	1–1
Swansea City	0–1	2–0	2–1	2–4	2–1	1–0	1–1	4–1	0–2	2–0	2–3	0–1	2–0	0–1	1–0	1–2	2–0	3–1		1–0	2–1	1–0
Watford	1–0	0–0	4–0	0–0	1–1	2–1	2–3	4–0	1–3	0–1	2–0	2–1	1–0	0–3	0–0	1–2	0–1	1–1	0–0		2–0	3–1
West Ham United	1–2	2–1	2–1	3–1	3–0	4–1	0–1	2–3	3–1	1–2	1–1	1–2	1–0	2–0	2–0	2–1	1–3	2–1	2–0	1–1		1–0
Wrexham	1–0	1–2	1–0	1–0	0–1	3–2	2–0	1–1	0–1	3–1	1–0	1–0	1–1	2–1	2–0	1–3	0–1	0–1	1–0	3–0	1–0	

Updated to match(es) played on unknown. Source: Soccerbase
Legend: Blue = home team win; Yellow = draw; Red = away team win.

=== Maps ===
Locations of the Football League Second Division London teams 1979–1980
Locations of the Football League Second Division 1979–1980 teams

== Third Division ==
Football League Third Division
- Season: 1979–80
- Champions: Grimsby Town (1st title)
- Promoted: Blackburn Rovers; Sheffield Wednesday
- Relegated: Bury; Mansfield Town; Southend United; Wimbledon
- Matches: 552
- Goals: 1,422 (2.58 per match)
- Top goalscorer: Terry Curran (Sheffield Wednesday), 22

Pos	Team	Pld	W	D	L	GF	GA	GD	Pts	Promotion or relegation
1	Grimsby Town (C, P)	46	26	10	10	73	42	+31	62	Promotion to the Second Division
2	Blackburn Rovers (P)	46	25	9	12	58	36	+22	59	Promotion to the Second Division
3	Sheffield Wednesday (P)	46	21	16	9	81	47	+34	58	Promotion to the Second Division
4	Chesterfield	46	23	11	12	71	46	+25	57	
5	Colchester United	46	20	12	14	64	56	+8	52	
6	Carlisle United	46	18	12	16	66	56	+10	48	
7	Reading	46	16	16	14	66	65	+1	48	
8	Exeter City	46	19	10	17	60	68	−8	48	
9	Chester	46	17	13	16	49	57	−8	47	
10	Swindon Town	46	19	8	19	71	63	+8	46	
11	Barnsley	46	16	14	16	53	56	−3	46	
12	Sheffield United	46	18	10	18	60	66	−6	46	
13	Rotherham United	46	18	10	18	58	66	−8	46	
14	Millwall	46	16	13	17	65	59	+6	45	
15	Plymouth Argyle	46	16	12	18	59	55	+4	44	
16	Gillingham	46	14	14	18	49	51	−2	42	
17	Oxford United	46	14	13	19	57	62	−5	41	
18	Blackpool	46	15	11	20	62	74	−12	41	
19	Brentford	46	15	11	20	59	73	−14	41	
20	Hull City	46	12	16	18	51	69	−18	40	
21	Bury (R)	46	16	7	23	45	59	−14	39	Relegation to the Fourth Division
22	Southend United (R)	46	14	10	22	47	58	−11	38	Relegation to the Fourth Division
23	Mansfield Town (R)	46	10	16	20	47	58	−11	36	Relegation to the Fourth Division
24	Wimbledon (R)	46	10	14	22	52	81	−29	34	Relegation to the Fourth Division

Source: rsssf.com
(C) Champions; (P) Promoted; (R) Relegated

=== Results ===
Home \ Away	BAR	BLB	BLP	BRE	BRY	CRL	CHE	CHF	COL	EXE	GIL	GRI	HUL	MAN	MIL	OXF	PLY	REA	ROT	SHU	SHW	STD	SWI	WDN
Barnsley		1–1	2–1	1–0	2–1	1–1	1–1	0–1	1–2	2–2	2–0	0–1	3–1	1–0	2–1	2–0	0–0	2–0	0–0	0–0	0–3	1–2	1–2	4–0
Blackburn Rovers	0–1		2–0	3–0	1–2	1–2	2–0	1–0	3–0	1–1	3–1	0–0	1–0	0–0	1–1	2–1	1–0	4–2	0–3	1–0	1–2	1–1	2–0	3–0
Blackpool	1–1	2–1		5–4	1–2	2–1	0–0	2–2	1–0	1–0	2–1	0–3	2–2	1–1	2–2	1–2	1–3	5–2	3–2	2–3	1–1	1–0	0–1	3–0
Brentford	3–1	2–0	2–1		0–0	0–3	2–2	3–1	1–0	0–2	0–2	1–0	7–2	2–0	1–0	1–1	0–0	2–2	0–1	1–2	2–2	1–4	1–3	0–1
Bury	2–2	1–2	3–0	4–2		0–2	2–0	2–0	0–1	3–0	0–2	1–1	0–1	0–2	3–0	1–2	2–1	1–0	1–0	1–2	1–0	1–1	0–0	1–2
Carlisle United	3–1	1–1	2–0	3–1	1–0		2–2	0–2	2–0	4–1	1–2	0–2	3–2	1–1	4–0	2–2	2–1	3–3	3–1	1–0	0–2	4–0	2–1	1–1
Chester	1–1	0–0	1–0	1–1	1–0	1–0		1–0	2–1	1–3	0–2	3–1	2–1	1–0	2–0	1–0	1–0	0–2	3–1	1–1	2–2	2–1	1–0	3–1
Chesterfield	2–0	0–1	0–0	1–0	2–0	3–2	2–0		3–0	3–0	0–0	2–3	1–1	2–0	3–2	2–2	3–1	7–1	3–0	2–1	2–1	1–0	2–1	0–0
Colchester United	0–0	0–1	3–1	6–1	2–1	1–1	1–1	0–1		0–0	2–2	2–1	1–1	2–1	0–0	3–0	5–2	1–1	1–1	1–0	0–0	2–1	2–3	4–0
Exeter City	2–1	2–0	1–0	0–0	1–0	1–2	1–0	1–2	3–1		3–1	1–2	2–2	2–1	2–1	0–0	2–1	1–0	1–1	3–1	1–0	4–2	4–1	0–2
Gillingham	1–1	1–2	1–1	0–1	2–1	1–1	2–2	0–1	2–2	1–0		0–1	1–0	2–0	1–1	4–0	0–1	1–1	0–1	3–0	1–1	1–0	0–0	1–0
Grimsby Town	3–0	1–2	4–3	5–1	1–0	2–0	0–2	1–1	1–2	4–1	1–0		1–1	2–1	2–0	2–0	1–0	2–1	2–0	4–0	3–1	1–0	2–0	1–0
Hull City	0–2	0–1	3–1	2–1	0–1	2–0	1–0	2–1	0–2	2–2	0–0	2–2		3–1	1–0	2–2	1–0	0–1	1–1	3–1	1–1	1–0	1–0	1–1
Mansfield Town	1–4	0–1	1–1	0–0	1–0	2–1	2–1	3–2	0–1	0–1	2–0	0–0	1–1		1–0	1–0	0–0	2–2	5–1	3–4	1–1	3–1	1–1	1–1
Millwall	2–2	1–0	2–0	3–1	0–1	1–0	3–1	2–0	1–2	5–1	2–0	2–0	3–2	2–2		3–0	2–1	2–0	0–0	1–1	3–3	1–2	6–2	2–2
Oxford United	1–0	0–1	0–2	0–2	3–1	1–0	0–1	1–2	0–2	2–0	1–1	0–1	3–0	3–1	1–2		1–1	4–0	5–1	1–1	0–2	1–0	2–2	4–1
Plymouth Argyle	2–1	0–1	2–2	0–1	2–0	4–2	1–0	1–0	2–0	2–0	2–2	1–1	5–1	0–0	1–1	1–1		2–0	1–0	4–1	1–3	0–0	2–0	0–0
Reading	7–0	1–0	0–1	2–2	3–1	2–0	2–1	2–2	2–0	2–1	1–3	1–1	3–0	1–0	2–0	2–0	1–0		1–1	2–1	0–2	1–1	2–1	3–0
Rotherham United	1–1	1–3	0–2	4–2	0–2	4–1	2–0	2–0	3–0	2–0	2–1	0–0	2–1	2–1	2–1	0–2	3–1	1–1		1–2	1–2	2–1	3–0	0–0
Sheffield United	2–0	2–1	3–1	0–2	0–0	0–2	1–1	0–2	1–2	3–1	4–0	1–1	1–1	1–0	0–1	3–1	3–2	2–0	1–0		1–1	2–0	2–1	2–1
Sheffield Wednesday	0–2	0–3	4–1	0–2	5–1	0–0	3–0	3–3	3–0	0–1	1–0	2–0	0–0	0–0	2–0	2–2	0–1	1–1	5–0	4–0		2–0	4–2	3–1
Southend	2–1	0–1	0–1	3–2	0–0	1–0	4–1	0–0	0–1	4–0	0–3	1–0	3–0	1–1	1–0	1–1	4–1	2–2	0–2	2–1	1–1		1–0	1–3
Swindon Town	0–1	2–0	2–1	4–0	8–0	0–0	3–1	2–1	2–3	2–3	3–0	3–0	0–0	2–1	1–0	1–1	2–1	0–0	6–2	3–2	1–2	1–0		2–1
Wimbledon	1–2	1–0	1–2	0–0	0–1	0–0	2–3	1–1	3–3	2–2	1–0	3–6	3–2	3–2	2–2	1–3	3–1	1–1	0–1	1–1	3–4	0–1	2–0	

Updated to match(es) played on unknown. Source: Soccerbase
Legend: Blue = home team win; Yellow = draw; Red = away team win.

=== Maps ===
Locations of the Football League Third Division London teams 1979–1980
Locations of the Football League Third Division teams 1979–1980

== Fourth Division ==
Football League Fourth Division
- Season: 1979–80
- Champions: Huddersfield Town (1st title)
- Promoted: Newport County; Portsmouth; Walsall
- Failed re-election: None
- Matches: 552
- Goals: 1,460 (2.64 per match)
- Top goalscorer: Colin Garwood (Portsmouth / Aldershot), 27

Pos	Team	Pld	W	D	L	GF	GA	GD	Pts	Promotion
1	Huddersfield Town (C, P)	46	27	12	7	101	48	+53	66	Promotion to the Third Division
2	Walsall (P)	46	23	18	5	75	47	+28	64	Promotion to the Third Division
3	Newport County (P)	46	27	7	12	83	50	+33	61	Cup Winners' Cup first round and promotion to the Third Division
4	Portsmouth (P)	46	24	12	10	91	49	+42	60	Promotion to the Third Division
5	Bradford City	46	24	12	10	77	50	+27	60	
6	Wigan Athletic	46	21	13	12	76	61	+15	55	
7	Lincoln City	46	18	17	11	64	42	+22	53	
8	Peterborough United	46	21	10	15	58	47	+11	52	
9	Torquay United	46	15	17	14	70	69	+1	47	
10	Aldershot	46	16	13	17	62	53	+9	45	
11	Bournemouth	46	13	18	15	52	51	+1	44	
12	Doncaster Rovers	46	15	14	17	62	63	−1	44	
13	Northampton Town	46	16	12	18	51	66	−15	44	
14	Scunthorpe United	46	14	15	17	58	75	−17	43	
15	Tranmere Rovers	46	14	13	19	50	56	−6	41	
16	Stockport County	46	14	12	20	48	72	−24	40	
17	York City	46	14	11	21	65	82	−17	39	
18	Halifax Town	46	13	13	20	46	72	−26	39	
19	Hartlepool United	46	14	10	22	59	64	−5	38	
20	Port Vale	46	12	12	22	56	70	−14	36	
21	Hereford United	46	11	14	21	38	52	−14	36	Re-elected
22	Darlington	46	9	17	20	50	74	−24	35	Re-elected
23	Crewe Alexandra	46	11	13	22	35	68	−33	35	Re-elected
24	Rochdale	46	7	13	26	33	79	−46	27	Re-elected

(C) Champions; (P) Promoted

=== Results ===
Home \ Away	ALD	BOU	BRA	CRE	DAR	DON	HAL	HAR	HER	HUD	LIN	NPC	NOR	PET	POR	PTV	ROC	SCU	STP	TOR	TRA	WAL	WIG	YOR
Aldershot		0–1	3–1	3–0	1–1	1–1	3–1	0–2	3–3	0–2	2–0	0–1	2–0	2–0	1–2	3–1	3–0	2–0	2–0	1–1	0–0	1–1	0–3	2–2
Bournemouth	3–1		1–1	0–1	1–0	0–0	0–1	2–1	2–2	1–3	0–0	3–2	2–2	0–0	0–1	3–1	4–0	3–3	2–0	1–2	2–1	1–1	1–2	0–0
Bradford City	2–0	2–2		4–0	3–0	3–1	2–0	2–0	1–0	0–0	1–1	3–0	3–1	1–1	0–0	2–0	1–2	2–0	6–1	1–1	2–0	0–1	2–1	1–2
Crewe Alexandra	1–0	0–0	2–0		0–0	1–2	2–1	2–1	1–0	1–3	0–2	0–3	2–1	1–4	1–1	0–2	2–1	1–1	1–0	2–2	0–0	1–2	2–1	2–0
Darlington	0–0	0–1	3–4	0–0		2–1	1–1	0–1	1–1	2–3	1–1	1–1	0–0	1–1	1–1	1–1	3–1	3–1	3–0	2–0	3–1	1–3	2–2	2–1
Doncaster Rovers	1–1	1–0	0–3	1–1	0–1		2–1	0–2	1–0	1–2	1–1	1–3	2–1	2–1	2–0	2–3	2–0	5–0	1–1	5–3	1–1	1–1	3–1	2–0
Halifax Town	1–0	2–0	0–1	3–1	1–1	1–1		2–1	1–0	2–1	1–0	2–1	2–1	0–0	1–2	0–0	1–0	2–2	1–3	3–3	0–0	2–0	0–0	1–1
Hartlepool	1–0	3–1	0–1	3–1	3–1	1–2	1–2		3–0	1–1	0–0	0–0	2–1	1–2	0–3	2–1	1–1	3–2	1–2	2–2	2–1	2–2	1–1	3–1
Hereford United	0–1	2–1	0–2	2–0	1–0	2–2	2–0	2–1		1–3	0–0	0–2	0–1	0–1	0–0	0–0	1–1	1–1	2–0	0–0	1–2	0–1	2–1	3–1
Huddersfield Town	2–0	2–0	0–0	3–0	2–1	3–0	5–0	2–1	0–1		3–2	2–1	5–0	0–0	1–3	7–1	5–1	2–1	5–0	4–2	1–1	1–1	4–0	2–2
Lincoln City	1–1	1–1	1–0	3–0	2–1	1–1	4–0	3–3	2–0	2–0		2–1	0–0	0–1	1–0	3–0	0–0	4–0	1–0	2–0	3–0	2–2	4–0	1–1
Newport County	4–2	0–0	1–2	1–1	4–0	2–1	5–2	1–0	1–0	2–2	1–1		2–1	1–1	4–3	2–1	1–0	2–1	3–1	3–0	2–0	0–1	3–2	2–0
Northampton Town	2–1	0–1	1–2	1–0	2–0	1–0	0–0	2–1	2–0	4–2	0–0	3–2		1–0	0–2	3–1	0–0	0–0	2–0	3–0	2–1	1–2	1–1	2–0
Peterborough United	1–3	2–0	1–0	3–0	3–0	3–2	2–1	2–0	2–0	1–3	3–1	0–1	0–0		0–0	3–0	2–0	3–1	1–1	2–1	1–2	1–3	1–2	2–1
Portsmouth	1–3	4–0	4–1	1–1	4–3	2–0	3–1	2–1	0–0	4–1	4–0	0–2	6–1	4–0		2–2	3–0	6–1	1–0	3–0	1–1	1–2	1–1	5–2
Port Vale	0–2	1–1	1–2	2–0	2–0	3–0	1–0	1–1	0–1	1–1	1–2	2–0	5–0	0–1	2–3		5–1	1–0	1–2	1–1	0–1	2–2	1–1	1–2
Rochdale	2–1	0–2	0–1	0–0	2–2	3–2	2–2	1–0	0–2	0–2	1–1	2–0	3–2	0–0	1–2	0–2		0–1	0–1	0–0	2–0	1–1	0–2	0–2
Scunthorpe United	1–1	2–1	3–3	1–1	3–0	0–0	1–0	1–3	1–0	1–1	1–0	1–3	3–0	1–0	1–0	1–0	2–0		1–1	1–1	2–2	2–2	1–3	6–1
Stockport County	0–4	1–1	2–2	2–1	1–1	0–3	4–1	0–0	2–1	1–2	2–1	0–5	2–0	1–0	1–1	0–1	1–1	1–2		4–0	2–2	1–0	1–2	1–0
Torquay United	2–1	0–0	2–3	1–0	4–0	2–2	3–0	3–1	1–1	3–1	2–5	2–0	2–2	2–0	2–1	1–1	3–0	3–0	0–0		3–1	0–1	2–2	4–3
Tranmere	1–2	0–5	4–0	2–0	1–2	1–0	2–0	1–0	0–0	0–0	1–0	0–2	1–1	3–0	4–1	1–1	5–1	1–2	0–1	2–0		0–1	1–3	1–2
Walsall	1–1	0–0	1–1	1–0	1–1	3–1	2–0	3–1	3–2	1–1	3–0	2–4	5–1	2–3	1–1	2–1	2–0	1–1	2–1	1–1	2–0		1–1	3–1
Wigan Athletic	2–1	2–1	4–1	2–0	4–1	0–0	3–1	2–1	1–1	1–2	2–1	0–1	0–0	2–1	1–2	3–1	1–1	4–1	3–1	0–3	0–0	3–0		2–5
York City	1–1	1–1	2–2	2–2	3–1	1–3	2–2	2–1	0–4	3–1	0–2	2–1	1–2	0–2	1–0	5–1	3–2	2–0	2–2	1–0	0–1	0–1	1–2	

Updated to match(es) played on unknown. Source: Soccerbase
Legend: Blue = home team win; Yellow = draw; Red = away team win.

=== Maps ===
Locations of the Football League Fourth Division teams 1979–1980

== Election/Re-election to the Football League ==
Winners of the Alliance Premier League, Altrincham, won the right to apply for election to the Football League to replace one of the four bottom teams in the 1979–80 Football League Division Four. The vote went as follows:

Club	Final Position	Votes
Darlington	22nd (Division Four)	49
Crewe Alexandra	23rd (Division Four)	48
Hereford United	21st (Division Four)	48
Rochdale	24th (Division Four)	26
Altrincham	1st (Alliance Premier League)	25

As a result of this, all four Football League teams were re-elected, and Altrincham were denied membership of the League.

== Attendances ==
=== Division One ===
No.	Club	Average	Highest	Lowest
1	Manchester United	51,608	58,348	43,329
2	Liverpool FC	44,586	52,201	36,415
3	Manchester City FC	35,272	50,067	27,664
4	Arsenal FC	33,596	55,561	18,869
5	Tottenham Hotspur FC	32,018	51,389	19,843
6	Crystal Palace FC	29,794	45,746	19,453
7	Everton FC	28,711	53,018	20,356
8	Aston Villa FC	27,976	41,160	15,319
9	Nottingham Forest FC	26,350	32,266	21,242
10	Wolverhampton Wanderers FC	25,731	36,693	15,807
11	Brighton & Hove Albion FC	24,745	29,690	18,361
12	Leeds United FC	22,788	39,779	14,967
13	West Bromwich Albion FC	22,418	34,993	11,655
14	Ipswich Town FC	21,620	30,229	16,878
15	Southampton FC	21,335	23,259	16,309
16	Stoke City FC	20,176	32,699	14,422
17	Derby County FC	19,904	27,783	15,381
18	Coventry City FC	19,315	31,644	14,310
19	Bristol City FC	18,932	28,305	12,013
20	Middlesbrough FC	18,739	30,587	11,789
21	Norwich City FC	17,225	25,418	11,657
22	Bolton Wanderers FC	16,353	31,902	8,995

=== Division Two ===
No.	Club	Average	Highest	Lowest
1	Sunderland AFC	27,119	47,129	19,456
2	Newcastle United FC	23,345	38,784	13,765
3	Chelsea FC	23,266	32,467	16,519
4	West Ham United FC	22,872	37,167	11,721
5	Birmingham City FC	20,427	33,863	13,997
6	Leicester City FC	18,636	26,075	12,877
7	Watford FC	15,462	25,502	11,589
8	Swansea City AFC	14,391	21,306	10,442
9	Queens Park Rangers FC	14,087	26,598	8,372
10	Luton Town FC	11,676	20,040	6,705
11	Wrexham AFC	10,090	15,601	4,357
12	Cardiff City FC	9,926	19,834	6,342
13	Preston North End FC	9,751	13,150	7,407
14	Notts County FC	8,818	14,849	5,505
15	Shrewsbury Town FC	8,782	14,801	5,670
16	Fulham FC	8,419	22,258	3,566
17	Burnley FC	8,118	16,634	5,353
18	Oldham Athletic FC	7,918	11,485	5,198
19	Bristol Rovers FC	7,399	14,176	4,596
20	Leyton Orient FC	7,245	23,883	3,781
21	Charlton Athletic FC	7,175	19,021	3,672
22	Cambridge United FC	6,127	8,863	4,423

=== Division Three ===
No.	Club	Average	Highest	Lowest
1	Sheffield Wednesday FC	18,289	49,309	10,753
2	Sheffield United FC	16,584	42,526	8,621
3	Barnsley FC	11,890	22,360	8,567
4	Grimsby Town FC	10,618	19,566	6,166
5	Blackburn Rovers FC	10,311	26,130	5,759
6	Swindon Town FC	8,902	16,658	6,318
7	Brentford FC	7,818	13,764	4,992
8	Chesterfield FC	7,760	14,950	4,126
9	Reading FC	6,713	10,194	5,166
10	Gillingham FC	6,131	8,769	3,479
11	Rotherham United FC	5,993	20,355	3,061
12	Hull City AFC	5,986	14,176	3,297
13	Millwall FC	5,918	7,940	3,997
14	Blackpool FC	5,818	10,392	3,302
15	Plymouth Argyle FC	5,776	10,214	4,095
16	Mansfield Town FC	5,467	16,019	2,973
17	Oxford United FC	4,832	9,645	2,848
18	Southend United FC	4,758	7,756	2,966
19	Exeter City FC	4,574	10,589	2,648
20	Carlisle United FC	4,406	6,297	3,267
21	Bury FC	4,239	13,360	2,443
22	Colchester United FC	3,816	6,135	2,346
23	Chester City FC	3,726	6,638	2,187
24	Wimbledon FC	3,426	6,009	1,759

=== Division Four ===
No.	Club	Average	Highest	Lowest
1	Portsmouth FC	15,850	23,691	11,430
2	Huddersfield Town AFC	8,714	17,233	3,134
3	Wigan Athletic FC	5,905	8,198	4,316
4	Bradford City AFC	5,744	10,509	3,668
5	Walsall FC	5,549	9,251	3,786
6	Newport County AFC	5,139	8,383	3,185
7	Doncaster Rovers FC	4,321	9,801	2,327
8	Peterborough United FC	4,135	5,371	2,641
9	AFC Bournemouth	3,924	14,114	2,335
10	Aldershot Town FC	3,859	11,989	2,057
11	Lincoln City FC	3,713	5,011	2,440
12	Port Vale FC	3,462	6,756	2,338
13	Hereford United FC	3,355	7,945	1,995
14	Torquay United FC	3,184	5,729	1,581
15	Northampton Town FC	3,024	10,713	1,852
16	Hartlepool United FC	2,915	5,959	1,706
17	Stockport County FC	2,911	5,369	1,789
18	Crewe Alexandra FC	2,745	5,632	1,909
19	York City FC	2,716	5,742	1,791
20	Halifax Town AFC	2,582	10,061	1,022
21	Scunthorpe United FC	2,266	4,640	1,586
22	Tranmere Rovers	2,246	3,550	1,214
23	Darlington FC	1,972	4,628	1,238
24	Rochdale AFC	1,926	4,979	958

== See also ==
- 1979-80 in English football
