= 1983–84 Huddersfield Town A.F.C. season =

Huddersfield Town
1983–84 season
- Chairman: Keith Longbottom
- Manager: Mick Buxton
- Stadium: Leeds Road
- Second Division: 12th
- FA Cup: Fourth round (eliminated by Notts County)
- League Cup: Third round (eliminated by Stoke City)
- Top goalscorer: League: Mark Lillis (11); All: Mark Lillis (14)
- Highest home attendance: 25,101 vs Newcastle United (7 May 1984)
- Lowest home attendance: 5,190 vs Mansfield Town (13 September 1983)
- Biggest win: 5–1 vs Mansfield Town (13 September 1983); 4–0 vs Cardiff City (28 April 1984)
- Biggest defeat: 2–5 vs Newcastle United (10 December 1983)

Huddersfield Town's 1983–84 campaign was Town's first season in the second tier since the 1972–73 season under the management of Ian Greaves. They finished in 12th place.

== Squad at the start of the season ==
Note: Flags indicate national team as defined under FIFA eligibility rules; some limited exceptions apply. Players may hold more than one non-FIFA nationality.

Pos.	Nation	Player
GK	ENG	Brian Cox
GK	ENG	Keith Mason
DF	ENG	Kevin Bird
DF	ENG	David Burke
DF	WAL	Steve Doyle
DF	ENG	Keith Hanvey
DF	ENG	Paul Jones
DF	ENG	Brian Laws
DF	ENG	Steve Stoutt

Pos.	Nation	Player
DF	ENG	Dave Sutton
MF	ENG	David Cowling
MF	WAL	Daral Pugh
MF	ENG	Brian Stanton
MF	ENG	Phil Wilson
FW	ENG	Roy Greenwood
FW	ENG	Mark Lillis
FW	ENG	Colin Russell
FW	ENG	Kevin Stonehouse

== Review ==
Following their impressive promotion campaign the previous season, many Town fans were hoping that Town would return to the promised land of the First Division and Town had a fairly good start to the season, with the exception of losing their 34 match unbeaten home record, which went back to the end of the 1981–82 season, when they lost 3–2 to Chelsea in September.

Following Christmas, Town suffered a dramatic lost in form, going on a run of 9 matches without a win, which seemed to put Town in a downward spiral right back to the Third Division. So Mick Buxton decided to bring in some more strikers on loan to help Town in their time of need.

Peter Eastoe (on loan from West Bromwich Albion) and Mel Eves (on loan from Wolverhampton Wanderers) helped bring up a mini-revival which eventually got Town clear of the relegation mess and finished in a respectable 12th place with 57 points, the same number of points as Fulham and Charlton Athletic.

== Squad at the end of the season ==
Note: Flags indicate national team as defined under FIFA eligibility rules; some limited exceptions apply. Players may hold more than one non-FIFA nationality.

Pos.	Nation	Player
GK	ENG	Brian Cox
GK	ENG	Keith Mason
DF	ENG	David Burke
DF	WAL	Steve Doyle
DF	ENG	Keith Hanvey
DF	ENG	Paul Jones
DF	ENG	Brian Laws
DF	ENG	Steve Stoutt
DF	ENG	Dave Sutton
MF	ENG	David Cowling

Pos.	Nation	Player
MF	WAL	Daral Pugh
MF	ENG	Brian Stanton
MF	ENG	Phil Wilson
FW	ENG	Graham Cooper
FW	ENG	Peter Eastoe (on loan from West Bromwich Albion)
FW	ENG	Roy Greenwood
FW	ENG	Mark Lillis
FW	ENG	Liam Robinson
FW	ENG	Colin Russell

== Results ==
=== Division Two ===
Date	Opponents	Home/ Away	Result F–A	Scorers	Attendance	Position
27 August 1983	Blackburn Rovers	A	2–2	Lillis, Stonehouse (pen)	7,739	9th
3 September 1983	Charlton Athletic	H	0–0		8,113	16th
6 September 1983	Crystal Palace	H	2–1	Lillis (2)	7,814	10th
10 September 1983	Oldham Athletic	A	3–0	Stanton, Cowling, Lillis	8,543	5th
17 September 1983	Swansea City	H	1–0	Stanton	10,116	3rd
24 September 1983	Carlisle United	A	0–0		5,461	3rd
1 October 1983	Chelsea	H	2–3	Stanton, Lillis	13,280	7th
8 October 1983	Grimsby Town	H	0–0		8,897	7th
15 October 1983	Barnsley	A	2–2	Lillis, Russell (pen)	14,096	8th
18 October 1983	Cambridge United	A	3–0	Lillis, Stanton, Russell (pen)	3,513	6th
22 October 1983	Derby County	H	3–0	Lillis, Russell, Cowling	10,752	5th
29 October 1983	Sheffield Wednesday	A	0–0		27,824	5th
5 November 1983	Brighton & Hove Albion	A	1–3	Sutton	11,063	5th
12 November 1983	Shrewsbury Town	H	1–0	Wilson	8,798	5th
19 November 1983	Fulham	H	2–0	Stanton, Russell (pen)	8,914	5th
26 November 1983	Cardiff City	A	1–3	Russell	6,067	5th
3 December 1983	Portsmouth	H	2–1	Pugh, Stonehouse	8,724	5th
10 December 1983	Newcastle United	A	2–5	Wilson, Jones	25,747	6th
17 December 1983	Middlesbrough	H	2–2	Cowling, Stonehouse (pen)	7,889	8th
26 December 1983	Leeds United	A	2–1	Russell, Lillis	23,791	6th
27 December 1983	Manchester City	H	1–3	Stonehouse	23,497	8th
31 December 1983	Charlton Athletic	A	2–1	Hanvey, Russell	5,972	8th
2 January 1984	Carlisle United	H	0–0		10,621	9th
14 January 1984	Blackburn Rovers	H	0–2		8,203	9th
18 January 1984	Swansea City	A	2–2	Pugh, Lillis	4,944	9th
4 February 1984	Chelsea	A	1–3	Doyle	17,922	9th
11 February 1984	Oldham Athletic	H	0–1		8,162	9th
25 February 1984	Derby County	A	1–1	Stanton	13,525	9th
3 March 1984	Brighton & Hove Albion	H	0–1		6,985	10th
10 March 1984	Shrewsbury Town	A	0–1		3,627	11th
17 March 1984	Crystal Palace	A	0–0		5,003	12th
24 March 1984	Cambridge United	H	3–0	Eves (2), Jones (pen)	6,037	11th
31 March 1984	Grimsby Town	A	1–2	Jones (pen)	7,541	12th
7 April 1984	Barnsley	H	0–1		9,657	13th
14 April 1984	Fulham	A	2–0	Lillis, Eves	5,265	12th
21 April 1984	Leeds United	H	2–2	Eves, Doyle	16,270	13th
23 April 1984	Manchester City	A	3–2	Jones (pen), Pugh, Wilson	23,247	10th
28 April 1984	Cardiff City	H	4–0	Jones (3, 2 pens), Pugh	5,599	11th
1 May 1984	Sheffield Wednesday	H	0–1		18,488	11th
5 May 1984	Portsmouth	A	1–1	Robinson	7,738	12th
7 May 1984	Newcastle United	H	2–2	Cooper, Carney (og)	25,101	12th
12 May 1984	Middlesbrough	A	0–0		5,687	12th

=== FA Cup ===
Date	Round	Opponents	Home/ Away	Result F–A	Scorers	Attendance
7 January 1984	Round 3	Queens Park Rangers	H	2–1	Lillis, Stonehouse	11,984
1 February 1984	Round 4	Notts County	H	1–2	Stonehouse	13,634

=== League Cup ===
Date	Round	Opponents	Home/ Away	Result F–A	Scorers	Attendance
30 August 1983	Round 1 1st Leg	Mansfield Town	A	2–1	Sutton, Russell	3,734
13 September 1983	Round 1 2nd Leg	Mansfield Town	H	5–1	Lillis (2), Jones, Stanton, Sutton	5,190: Huddersfield won 7–2 on aggregate.
4 October 1983	Round 2 1st Leg	Watford	H	2–1	Cowling, Bolton (og)	10,631
25 October 1983	Round 2 2nd Leg	Watford	A	2–2	Sutton, Jones	13,006: Huddersfield won 4–3 on aggregate.
8 November 1983	Round 3	Stoke City	A	0–0		14,175
22 November 1983	Round 3 Replay	Stoke City	H	0–2		14,191

== Appearances and goals ==
Name	Nationality	Position	League		FA Cup		League Cup		Total	
Name	Nationality	Position	Apps	Goals	Apps	Goals	Apps	Goals	Apps	Goals
Kevin Bird	England	DF	1	0	0	0	0	0	1	0
David Burke	England	DF	42	0	2	0	6	0	50	0
Graham Cooper	England	FW	3	1	0	0	0	0	3	1
David Cowling	England	MF	40 (1)	3	2	0	6	1	48 (1)	4
Brian Cox	England	GK	23	0	0	0	6	0	29	0
Steve Doyle	Wales	MF	34 (2)	2	2	0	4	0	40 (2)	2
Peter Eastoe	England	FW	8 (2)	0	0	0	0	0	8 (2)	0
Mel Eves	England	FW	7	4	0	0	0	0	7	4
Roy Greenwood	England	DF	1 (3)	0	0	0	0	0	1 (3)	0
Keith Hanvey	England	DF	9	1	2	0	0	0	11	1
Paul Jones	England	DF	36	7	0	0	6	2	42	9
Brian Laws	England	DF	31	0	0	0	5	0	36	0
Mark Lillis	England	MF	36 (1)	11	2	1	6	2	44 (1)	14
Keith Mason	England	GK	19	0	2	0	0	0	21	0
Daral Pugh	Wales	MF	19 (10)	4	2	0	1 (1)	0	24 (11)	4
Liam Robinson	England	FW	4 (1)	1	0	0	0	0	4 (1)	1
Colin Russell	England	FW	23 (2)	7	0 (1)	0	6	1	29 (3)	8
Brian Stanton	England	MF	33	6	1	0	6	1	40	7
Kevin Stonehouse	England	FW	15 (2)	4	2	2	2 (1)	0	19 (3)	6
Steve Stoutt	England	DF	3	0	1	0	0	0	4	0
Dave Sutton	England	DF	34	1	2	0	6	3	42	4
Phil Wilson	England	MF	41	3	2	0	6	0	49	3
