= 1984–85 Huddersfield Town A.F.C. season =

Huddersfield Town
1984–85 season
- Chairman: Keith Longbottom
- Manager: Mick Buxton
- Stadium: Leeds Road
- Second Division: 13th
- FA Cup: Fourth round (eliminated by Luton Town)
- League Cup: Second round (eliminated by Sheffield Wednesday)
- Top goalscorer: League: Dale Tempest (15); All: Mark Lillis; Dale Tempest (16 each)
- Highest home attendance: 15,640 vs Manchester City (12 January 1985)
- Lowest home attendance: 4,117 vs Notts County (20 April 1985)
- Biggest win: 3–1 vs Middlesbrough (3 November 1984); 2–0 vs Notts County (17 November 1984); 2–0 vs Sheffield United (1 December 1984); 3–1 vs Wolverhampton Wanderers (8 December 1984); 3–1 vs Blackburn Rovers (29 December 1984); 3–1 vs Wolverhampton Wanderers (23 January 1985); 2–0 vs Crystal Palace (16 February 1985); 2–0 vs Carlisle United (2 March 1985)
- Biggest defeat: 1–5 vs Shrewsbury Town (8 September 1984); 1–5 vs Grimsby Town (1 January 1985); 1–5 vs Shrewsbury Town (12 March 1985)

Huddersfield Town's 1984–85 campaign was a mediocre season for the Terriers, with the team finishing in 13th place, never looking likely to be promoted or relegated.

== Squad at the start of the season ==
Note: Flags indicate national team as defined under FIFA eligibility rules; some limited exceptions apply. Players may hold more than one non-FIFA nationality.

Pos.	Nation	Player
GK	ENG	Brian Cox
GK	ENG	Keith Mason
DF	ENG	Sam Allardyce
DF	ENG	David Burke
DF	WAL	Steve Doyle
DF	ENG	Paul Jones
DF	ENG	Brian Laws
DF	ENG	Steve Stoutt
MF	ENG	Peter Butler

Pos.	Nation	Player
MF	ENG	David Cowling
MF	WAL	Daral Pugh
MF	ENG	Brian Stanton
MF	ENG	Phil Wilson
MF	ENG	Julian Winter
FW	ENG	Graham Cooper
FW	ENG	Mark Lillis
FW	ENG	Liam Robinson
FW	ENG	Dale Tempest

== Review ==
Town didn't have the best start in their second season back in Division 2. By mid-October, Town were second bottom, following only winning one of their first 9 league games. But, a stunning turn in form saw Town go on a run of 9 games unbeaten, of which 8 of those were wins, helped by goals from Mark Lillis and Dale Tempest. That run saw Town climb to 9th in early December.

Following that run, Town lost 5 of the next 7, winning the other 2, but then a run of 9 games unbeaten seemed to try to force Town into a late promotion surge, but this was quickly ended by a dreadful late season run, which saw Town lose 6 of their last 8 games, finishing in a mediocre 13th place.

== Squad at the end of the season ==
Note: Flags indicate national team as defined under FIFA eligibility rules; some limited exceptions apply. Players may hold more than one non-FIFA nationality.

Pos.	Nation	Player
GK	ENG	Brian Cox
GK	ENG	Keith Mason
DF	ENG	Sam Allardyce
DF	ENG	David Burke
DF	ENG	Mick Carmody
DF	WAL	Steve Doyle
DF	ENG	Paul Jones
DF	ENG	Ian Measham
DF	ENG	Simon Webster
MF	ENG	Peter Butler
MF	ENG	David Cowling

Pos.	Nation	Player
MF	WAL	Daral Pugh
MF	ENG	Brian Stanton
MF	ENG	Robbie Turner
MF	ENG	Phil Wilson
MF	ENG	Julian Winter
FW	ENG	Graham Cooper
FW	ENG	Mark Lillis
FW	ENG	Liam Robinson
FW	ENG	Dale Tempest
FW	ENG	Ian Wadsworth

== Results ==
=== Division Two ===
Date	Opponents	Home/ Away	Result F - A	Scorers	Attendance	Position
25 August 1984	Oxford United	H	0–3		6,184	20th
28 August 1984	Charlton Athletic	A	2–2	Cooper, Tempest	4,989	16th
1 September 1984	Brighton & Hove Albion	A	1–0	Winter	12,493	12th
4 September 1984	Blackburn Rovers	H	1–1	Tempest	6,177	9th
8 September 1984	Shrewsbury Town	H	1–5	Cooper	4,980	15th
15 September 1984	Manchester City	A	0–1		20,201	16th
22 September 1984	Barnsley	H	1–1	Winter	6,864	19th
29 September 1984	Birmingham City	A	0–1		11,480	19th
6 October 1984	Fulham	A	1–2	Cowling	4,377	20th
13 October 1984	Wimbledon	H	2–1	Tempest, Doyle	5,001	18th
20 October 1984	Leeds United	H	1–0	Lillis	15,257	16th
27 October 1984	Carlisle United	A	1–0	Lillis	3,775	15th
3 November 1984	Middlesbrough	H	3–1	Laws, Tempest, Lillis	5,811	12th
10 November 1984	Crystal Palace	A	1–1	Pugh	4,906	12th
17 November 1984	Notts County	A	2–0	Stanton, Tempest	6,051	11th
24 November 1984	Cardiff City	H	2–1	Jones (pen), Tempest	6,495	10th
1 December 1984	Sheffield United	A	2–0	Doyle, Tempest	13,231	9th
8 December 1984	Wolverhampton Wanderers	H	3–1	Cooper (2), Burke	8,217	8th
15 December 1984	Portsmouth	A	2–3	Tempest, Waldron (og)	11,797	8th
22 December 1984	Brighton & Hove Albion	H	1–2	Tempest	6,876	9th
26 December 1984	Oldham Athletic	H	2–1	Tempest, Wilson	9,173	8th
29 December 1984	Blackburn Rovers	A	3–1	Tempest, Cowling, Cooper	15,524	6th
1 January 1985	Grimsby Town	A	1–5	Lillis	8,790	7th
12 January 1985	Manchester City	H	0–2		15,640	8th
2 February 1985	Birmingham City	H	0–1		7,460	11th
16 February 1985	Crystal Palace	H	2–0	Wilson, Lillis (pen)	5,678	9th
23 February 1985	Middlesbrough	A	2–2	Tempest, Cowling	4,453	11th
2 March 1985	Carlisle United	H	2–0	Lillis, Cowling	5,263	10th
9 March 1985	Leeds United	A	0–0		18,607	10th
12 March 1985	Shrewsbury Town	A	1–5	Tempest	3,291	11th
23 March 1985	Fulham	H	2–2	Lillis, Tempest	4,843	12th
30 March 1985	Charlton Athletic	H	2–1	Lillis (2 pens)	4,449	10th
6 April 1985	Oldham Athletic	A	2–2	Lillis (2, 1 pen)	5,286	12th
9 April 1985	Grimsby Town	H	0–0		5,834	12th
13 April 1985	Barnsley	A	1–2	Wilson	7,832	13th
17 April 1985	Oxford United	A	0–3		9,149	13th
20 April 1985	Notts County	H	1–2	Lillis (pen)	4,117	13th
27 April 1985	Cardiff City	A	0–3		3,414	13th
30 April 1985	Wimbledon	A	1–0	Webster	2,335	12th
6 May 1985	Wolverhampton Wanderers	A	1–2	Lillis (pen)	4,422	13th
11 May 1985	Portsmouth	H	0–2		13,290	13th
13 May 1985	Sheffield United	H	2–2	Tempest, Robinson	4,416	13th

=== FA Cup ===
Date	Round	Opponents	Home/ Away	Result F - A	Scorers	Attendance
5 January 1985	Round 3	Wolverhampton Wanderers	A	1–1	Tempest	8,589
23 January 1985	Round 3 Replay	Wolverhampton Wanderers	H	3–1	Lillis (2, 1 pen), Pugh	7,055
26 January 1985	Round 4	Luton Town	A	0–2		8,712

=== League Cup ===
Date	Round	Opponents	Home/ Away	Result F - A	Scorers	Attendance
25 September 1984	Round 2 1st Leg	Sheffield Wednesday	A	0–3		16,139
9 October 1984	Round 2 2nd Leg	Sheffield Wednesday	H	2–1	Jones, Lillis	7,163: Huddersfield lost 4–2 on aggregate.

== Appearances and goals ==
Name	Nationality	Position	League		FA Cup		League Cup		Total	
Name	Nationality	Position	Apps	Goals	Apps	Goals	Apps	Goals	Apps	Goals
Sam Allardyce	England	DF	37	0	3	0	2	0	42	0
David Burke	England	DF	31	1	3	0	2	0	36	1
Peter Butler	England	MF	0 (4)	0	0	0	0	0	0 (4)	0
Mick Carmody	England	DF	8	0	0	0	0	0	8	0
Graham Cooper	England	FW	31 (3)	5	3	0	2	0	36 (3)	5
David Cowling	England	MF	29 (3)	4	3	0	1	0	33 (3)	4
Brian Cox	England	GK	37	0	3	0	2	0	42	0
Steve Doyle	Wales	MF	36	2	3	0	2	0	41	2
Paul Jones	England	DF	23	1	0	0	2	1	25	2
Brian Laws	England	DF	25	1	3	0	2	0	30	1
Mark Lillis	England	MF	35	13	3	2	1	1	39	16
Keith Mason	England	GK	5	0	0	0	0	0	5	0
Ian Measham	England	DF	17	0	0	0	0	0	17	0
Daral Pugh	Wales	MF	24 (5)	1	1 (2)	1	1	0	26 (7)	2
Liam Robinson	England	FW	13 (2)	1	0	0	0	0	13 (2)	1
Brian Stanton	England	MF	3	1	0	0	0	0	3	1
Steve Stoutt	England	DF	3	0	3	0	0	0	6	0
Dale Tempest	England	FW	34 (1)	15	2	1	1	0	37 (1)	16
Robbie Turner	England	FW	0 (2)	0	0	0	1	0	1 (2)	0
Ian Wadsworth	England	FW	0 (1)	0	0	0	0	0	0 (1)	0
Simon Webster	England	DF	16	1	0	0	0	0	16	1
Phil Wilson	England	MF	40	3	3	0	2	0	45	3
Julian Winter	England	MF	15 (1)	2	0 (1)	0	1	0	16 (2)	2
