= 1982–83 Huddersfield Town A.F.C. season =

Huddersfield Town
1982–83 season
- Chairman: Keith Longbottom
- Manager: Mick Buxton
- Stadium: Leeds Road
- Football League Third Division: 3rd (promoted)
- FA Cup: Third round (eliminated by Chelsea)
- League Cup: Fourth round (eliminated by Arsenal)
- Top goalscorer: League: Mark Lillis (20); All: Mark Lillis (20)
- Highest home attendance: 18,438 vs Bradford City (1 January 1983)
- Lowest home attendance: 4,282 vs Walsall (11 September 1982)
- Biggest win: 6–0 vs Orient (28 September 1982)
- Biggest defeat: 0–3 vs Millwall (2 October 1982)

Huddersfield Town's 1982–83 campaign was one of Town's most successful seasons in their recent history. Under the leadership of Mick Buxton, Town managed to secure their second promotion in 4 seasons, following their promotion from the Fourth Division in the 1979-80 season. This is also the only season in Town's history to date, in which they were unbeaten at home all season. They finished 3rd, behind Portsmouth and Cardiff City.

== Squad at the start of the season ==
Note: Flags indicate national team as defined under FIFA eligibility rules; some limited exceptions apply. Players may hold more than one non-FIFA nationality.

Pos.	Nation	Player
GK	ENG	Brian Cox
GK	ENG	Keith Mason
DF	ENG	Malcolm Brown
DF	ENG	David Burke
DF	ENG	Keith Hanvey
DF	ENG	Dave Sutton
DF	ENG	Peter Valentine
MF	ENG	David Cowling

Pos.	Nation	Player
MF	ENG	Brian Stanton
MF	ENG	Phil Wilson
FW	ENG	Terry Austin
FW	ENG	Maurice Cox
FW	ENG	Roy Greenwood
FW	ENG	Tim Hotte
FW	ENG	Mark Lillis

== Review ==
Town had failed to get the good start to the season that they wanted by failing to win any of their first 5 league games. Following that start Mick Buxton made an inspired signing, the Liverpool striker Colin Russell. He scored two goals on his debut in Town's 2–0 win over Oxford United, which was followed by a 6–0 thrashing of Orient. Then, following a 3-game mini-blip, Town went on a run of 7 wins in a row. During that run, Mark Lillis scored 9 goals in 4 games, including 4 against Cardiff City.

As that run was winding down, Town also managed a sensational 1–0 win at Leeds United in the League Cup third round, in which David Cowling scored the famous header that knocked Town's rivals. They also gave a good thrashing to their other rivals Bradford City on New Year's Day, by beating them 6–3, in which Brian Stanton scored 4 times. Town's home form along with the goalscoring abilities of Mark Lillis, Colin Russell and Brian Stanton gave Town their only season in their history in which they didn't lose a single home game in any competition.

Town continued their run of good form for most of the remainder of the season and promotion was secured by beating promotion rivals Newport County at Leeds Road, which saw Town get promoted to Division 2 along with Portsmouth & Cardiff City.

== Squad at the end of the season ==
Note: Flags indicate national team as defined under FIFA eligibility rules; some limited exceptions apply. Players may hold more than one non-FIFA nationality.

Pos.	Nation	Player
GK	ENG	Brian Cox
GK	ENG	Keith Mason
DF	ENG	Malcolm Brown
DF	ENG	David Burke
DF	WAL	Steve Doyle
DF	ENG	Keith Hanvey
DF	ENG	Dave Sutton
DF	ENG	Peter Valentine
MF	ENG	David Cowling

Pos.	Nation	Player
MF	WAL	Daral Pugh
MF	ENG	Brian Stanton
MF	ENG	Phil Wilson
FW	ENG	Roy Greenwood
FW	ENG	Tim Hotte
FW	ENG	Mark Lillis
FW	ENG	Colin Russell
FW	ENG	Kevin Stonehouse

== Results ==
=== Division Three ===
Date	Opponents	Home/ Away	Result F - A	Scorers	Attendance	Position
28 August 1982	Exeter City	H	1–1	M. Cox	5,168	11th
4 September 1982	Wrexham	A	1–1	Bater (og)	3,925	18th
7 September 1982	Sheffield United	A	0–2		16,641	20th
11 September 1982	Walsall	H	2–2	Lillis, Doyle	4,282	21st
18 September 1982	Newport County	A	1–2	Stanton	3,536	22nd
25 September 1982	Oxford United	H	2–0	Russell (2)	4,958	17th
28 September 1982	Orient	H	6–0	Russell, Lillis, Pugh, Sutton, Stanton (2)	6,671	14th
2 October 1982	Millwall	A	0–3		3,004	18th
9 October 1982	Portsmouth	H	1–1	Brown	6,243	15th
16 October 1982	Preston North End	A	0–0		5,570	15th
19 October 1982	Southend United	H	2–1	Russell, Brown (pen)	4,750	14th
23 October 1982	Cardiff City	H	4–0	Lillis (4)	6,121	12th
30 October 1982	Gillingham	A	3–1	Lillis (2), Cowling	5,919	8th
2 November 1982	Doncaster Rovers	H	3–0	Lillis (2), Russell	6,848	7th
6 November 1982	Bournemouth	A	1–0	Lillis	5,194	6th
13 November 1982	Brentford	H	2–0	Russell (2)	10,034	5th
27 November 1982	Bristol Rovers	H	3–1	Pugh, Russell (2)	8,251	2nd
4 December 1982	Plymouth Argyle	A	1–2	Wilson	4,227	4th
18 December 1982	Reading	A	1–1	Stanton	2,468	6th
27 December 1982	Chesterfield	H	3–1	Brown (pen), Lillis, Russell	11,603	5th
28 December 1982	Lincoln City	A	2–1	Lillis, Hanvey	11,829	3rd
1 January 1983	Bradford City	H	6–3	Brown (pen), Stanton (4), Wilson	18,438	3rd
3 January 1983	Wigan Athletic	A	0–2		7,724	4th
15 January 1983	Exeter City	A	4–3	Lillis, Wilson, Stanton, Cowling	2,882	3rd
22 January 1983	Sheffield United	H	0–0		15,769	3rd
29 January 1983	Walsall	A	0–2		3,922	5th
5 February 1983	Oxford United	A	1–1	Brown	4,975	5th
12 February 1983	Millwall	H	5–1	Lillis, Russell (2), Hanvey, Wilson	8,111	5th
14 February 1983	Southend United	A	1–0	Lillis	2,262	4th
22 February 1983	Portsmouth	A	2–3	Russell, Brown (pen)	18,615	4th
26 February 1983	Preston North End	H	1–1	Cowling	8,562	4th
1 March 1983	Doncaster Rovers	A	4–0	Cowling, Lillis, Russell, Stanton	6,078	3rd
12 March 1983	Gillingham	H	3–2	Doyle, Brown (pen), Burke	8,264	3rd
15 March 1983	Cardiff City	A	1–1	Cowling	10,379	3rd
19 March 1983	Bournemouth	H	0–0		8,630	3rd
26 March 1983	Brentford	A	0–1		6,277	4th
29 March 1983	Wrexham	H	4–1	Lillis, Cowling, Hanvey, Stanton	9,519	4th
2 April 1983	Lincoln City	H	1–1	Sutton	13,028	5th
4 April 1983	Chesterfield	A	1–0	Lillis	6,729	3rd
9 April 1983	Plymouth Argyle	H	2–0	Hanvey, Brown (pen)	9,277	2nd
16 April 1983	Orient	A	3–1	Wilson, Stanton, Lillis	3,498	1st
23 April 1983	Reading	H	3–1	Stanton, Russell, Brown (pen)	10,885	1st
30 April 1983	Bristol Rovers	A	0–1		8,919	3rd
7 May 1983	Newport County	H	1–0	Cowling	16,509	3rd
10 May 1983	Wigan Athletic	H	1–1	Russell	11,093	3rd
14 May 1983	Bradford City	A	1–3	Wilson	10,375	3rd

=== FA Cup ===
Date	Round	Opponents	Home/ Away	Result F - A	Scorers	Attendance
20 November 1982	Round 1	Mossley	H	1–0	Brown	7,599
11 December 1982	Round 2	Altrincham	A	1–0	Stanton	5,800
8 January 1983	Round 3	Chelsea	H	1–1	Stanton	17,064
12 January 1983	Round 3 Replay	Chelsea	A	0–2		14,417

=== League Cup ===
Date	Round	Opponents	Home/ Away	Result F - A	Scorers	Attendance
31 August 1982	Round 1 1st Leg	Doncaster Rovers	H	1–1	Brown	4,430
14 September 1982	Round 1 2nd Leg	Doncaster Rovers	A	1–0	Brown	4,690: Huddersfield won 2–1 on aggregate.
5 October 1982	Round 2 1st Leg	Oxford United	H	2–0	Russell, Stanton	4,362
27 October 1982	Round 2 2nd Leg	Oxford United	A	0–1		4,982: Huddersfield won 2–1 on aggregate.
10 November 1982	Round 3	Leeds United	A	1–0	Cowling	24,215
30 November 1982	Round 4	Arsenal	A	0–1		17,742

== Appearances and goals ==
Name	Nationality	Position	League		FA Cup		League Cup		Total	
Name	Nationality	Position	Apps	Goals	Apps	Goals	Apps	Goals	Apps	Goals
Terry Austin	England	FW	3	0	0	0	1	0	4	0
Malcolm Brown	England	DF	46	9	4	1	6	1	56	11
David Burke	England	DF	44	1	4	0	5	0	53	1
David Cowling	England	MF	41	7	4	0	5	1	56	8
Brian Cox	England	GK	45	0	4	0	6	0	55	0
Maurice Cox	England	MF	3 (1)	1	0	0	1	0	4 (1)	1
Steve Doyle	Wales	MF	41 (1)	2	4	0	5	0	50 (1)	2
Roy Greenwood	England	DF	4	0	0 (1)	0	2	0	6 (1)	0
Keith Hanvey	England	DF	43	4	3	0	5	0	51	4
Tim Hotte	England	FW	1 (1)	0	0	0	0	0	1 (1)	0
Mick Laverick	England	MF	2	0	0	0	0	0	2	0
Mark Lillis	England	MF	46	20	4	0	6	0	56	20
Keith Mason	England	GK	1	0	0	0	0	0	1	0
Daral Pugh	Wales	MF	9 (18)	2	0 (1)	0	0	0	9 (19)	2
Colin Russell	England	FW	41	16	4	0	4	1	49	17
Brian Stanton	England	MF	40 (4)	13	4	2	6	2	50 (4)	17
Kevin Stonehouse	England	FW	5	0	0	0	0	0	5	0
Dave Sutton	England	DF	41	2	4	0	6	0	51	2
Peter Valentine	England	DF	5	0	1	0	2	0	8	0
Phil Wilson	England	MF	45	6	4	0	6	0	55	6
