= 1985–86 Huddersfield Town A.F.C. season =

Huddersfield Town
1985–86 season
- Chairman: Keith Longbottom
- Manager: Mick Buxton
- Stadium: Leeds Road
- Second Division: 16th
- FA Cup: Third round (eliminated by Reading)
- League Cup: Second round (eliminated by Shrewsbury Town)
- Top goalscorer: League: Dale Tempest (12); All: Dale Tempest (13)
- Highest home attendance: 11,667 vs Bradford City (7 September 1985)
- Lowest home attendance: 4,511 vs Shrewsbury Town (15 March 1986)
- Biggest win: 2–0 vs Bradford City (7 September 1985); 3–1 vs Leeds United (5 October 1985); 2–0 vs Oldham Athletic (21 Decembebr 1985); 3–1 vs Sheffield United (11 January 1986); 2–0 vs Sunderland (1 March 1986); 3–1 vs Barnsley (31 March 1986); 2–0 vs Stoke City (5 April 1986)
- Biggest defeat: 0–3 vs Shrewsbury Town (12 October 1985); 0–3 vs Stoke City (2 November 1985); 1–4 vs Portsmouth (1 February 1986); 1–4 vs Norwich City (12 March 1986); 0–3 vs Bradford City (22 March 1986); 0–3 vs Middlesbrough (29 March 1986); 0–3 vs Charlton Athletic (12 April 1986)

Huddersfield Town's 1985–86 campaign was another disappointing season for the Terriers, with the team struggling for consistency and survival in the Second Division, until the arrival of Scottish striker Duncan Shearer from Chelsea near the end of the season saw Town guarantee their status in 16th place.

== Squad at the start of the season ==
Note: Flags indicate national team as defined under FIFA eligibility rules; some limited exceptions apply. Players may hold more than one non-FIFA nationality.

| Pos. | Nation | Player |
|---|---|---|
| GK | ENG | Brian Cox |
| GK | ENG | Keith Mason |
| DF | WAL | Ian Bray |
| DF | ENG | Malcolm Brown |
| DF | ENG | David Burke |
| DF | WAL | Steve Doyle |
| DF | WAL | Joey Jones |
| DF | ENG | Paul Jones |
| DF | ENG | Simon Webster |
| MF | ENG | Peter Butler |

| Pos. | Nation | Player |
|---|---|---|
| MF | ENG | David Cowling |
| MF | ENG | Terry Curran |
| MF | ENG | Brian Stanton |
| MF | ENG | Phil Wilson |
| MF | ENG | Julian Winter |
| FW | ENG | Graham Cooper |
| FW | ENG | David Cork |
| FW | ENG | Paul Raynor |
| FW | ENG | Liam Robinson |
| FW | ENG | Dale Tempest |

== Review ==
Town had a good start to the season with Dale Tempest becoming the first and so far only Town player to score a hat-trick on the opening day of a league season in Town's 4–3 win over Millwall. He was top scorer with 12 goals, even though he was on loan at Gillingham in the latter part of the season, before moving to Lokeren in Belgium at the end of the season.

Between October and December, Town went on a run of 10 consecutive matches without a win, which saw Town hover dangerously above the relegation zone for most of the season. Following that they went on a run of only 1 defeat in 8 matches, followed by a run of 5 losses in 6, which forced manager Mick Buxton to bring in a new striker.

In came Chelsea striker Duncan Shearer, who scored a hat-trick on his full debut in Town's 3–1 win over Barnsley. That coupled with three other wins saw Town finish in 16th place, just 6 points and 3 places above the relegation zone.

== Squad at the end of the season ==
Note: Flags indicate national team as defined under FIFA eligibility rules; some limited exceptions apply. Players may hold more than one non-FIFA nationality.

| Pos. | Nation | Player |
|---|---|---|
| GK | ENG | Brian Cox |
| GK | ENG | Keith Mason |
| DF | WAL | Ian Bray |
| DF | ENG | Malcolm Brown |
| DF | ENG | David Burke |
| DF | WAL | Steve Doyle |
| DF | WAL | Joey Jones |
| DF | ENG | Simon Webster |
| DF | ENG | Paul Wilson |
| MF | ENG | Peter Butler |
| MF | ENG | David Cowling |

| Pos. | Nation | Player |
|---|---|---|
| MF | ENG | Terry Curran |
| MF | ENG | Brian Stanton |
| MF | ENG | Phil Wilson |
| MF | ENG | Julian Winter |
| FW | ENG | Graham Cooper |
| FW | ENG | David Cork |
| FW | ENG | Paul Raynor |
| FW | ENG | Liam Robinson |
| FW | SCO | Duncan Shearer |
| FW | ENG | Dale Tempest |

== Results ==
=== Division Two ===
| Date | Opponents | Home/ Away | Result F–A | Scorers | Attendance | Position |
|---|---|---|---|---|---|---|
| 17 August 1985 | Millwall | H | 4–3 | Tempest (3, 1 pen), Webster | 6,603 | 5th |
| 20 August 1985 | Grimsby Town | A | 1–1 | Curran | 6,180 | 3rd |
| 24 August 1985 | Oldham Athletic | A | 1–1 | Cork | 6,024 | 5th |
| 26 August 1985 | Portsmouth | H | 1–2 | Tempest | 9,298 | 8th |
| 31 August 1985 | Crystal Palace | A | 3–2 | Cork, Tempest, Webster | 6,026 | 8th |
| 3 September 1985 | Blackburn Rovers | H | 0–0 | | 9,060 | 6th |
| 7 September 1985 | Bradford City | H | 2–0 | Cowling, Cork | 11,667 | 4th |
| 14 September 1985 | Sheffield United | A | 1–1 | Cork | 13,854 | 7th |
| 21 September 1985 | Norwich City | H | 0–0 | | 7,225 | 7th |
| 28 September 1985 | Sunderland | A | 0–1 | | 18,979 | 9th |
| 5 October 1985 | Leeds United | H | 3–1 | Tempest, Stanton, Curran | 9,983 | 7th |
| 12 October 1985 | Shrewsbury Town | A | 0–3 | | 3,986 | 9th |
| 19 October 1985 | Hull City | A | 1–3 | Phil Wilson | 8,128 | 11th |
| 26 October 1985 | Carlisle United | H | 3–3 | Tempest, Raynor, Cork | 5,012 | 11th |
| 2 November 1985 | Stoke City | A | 0–3 | | 7,291 | 14th |
| 9 November 1985 | Charlton Athletic | H | 0–2 | | 5,205 | 16th |
| 16 November 1985 | Brighton & Hove Albion | A | 3–4 | Tempest, Cowling (2) | 7,952 | 16th |
| 23 November 1985 | Fulham | H | 1–3 | Tempest | 4,650 | 19th |
| 30 November 1985 | Wimbledon | A | 2–2 | Cork, Raynor | 2,805 | 18th |
| 7 December 1985 | Grimsby Town | H | 2–2 | Cowling (2) | 4,811 | 20th |
| 14 December 1985 | Millwall | A | 1–2 | Tempest | 3,645 | 21st |
| 21 December 1985 | Oldham Athletic | H | 2–0 | Cowling, Bray | 5,094 | 21st |
| 26 December 1985 | Barnsley | H | 1–1 | Raynor | 10,575 | 19th |
| 1 January 1986 | Middlesbrough | A | 1–0 | J. Jones | 8,487 | 20th |
| 11 January 1986 | Sheffield United | H | 3–1 | Raynor (2), Tempest | 9,268 | 18th |
| 18 January 1986 | Crystal Palace | H | 0–0 | | 5,729 | 17th |
| 1 February 1986 | Portsmouth | A | 1–4 | Tempest | 10,937 | 19th |
| 25 February 1986 | Hull City | H | 2–1 | Cork, Curran | 4,518 | 16th |
| 1 March 1986 | Sunderland | H | 2–0 | Curran (2) | 7,150 | 14th |
| 8 March 1986 | Leeds United | A | 0–2 | | 14,667 | 18th |
| 12 March 1986 | Norwich City | A | 1–4 | Curran | 12,772 | 18th |
| 15 March 1986 | Shrewsbury Town | H | 1–0 | Curran | 4,511 | 16th |
| 18 March 1986 | Carlisle United | A | 0–2 | | 3,334 | 16th |
| 22 March 1986 | Bradford City | A | 0–3 | | 9,058 | 18th |
| 29 March 1986 | Middlesbrough | H | 0–3 | | 5,585 | 18th |
| 31 March 1986 | Barnsley | A | 3–1 | Shearer (3) | 5,746 | 15th |
| 5 April 1986 | Stoke City | H | 2–0 | Shearer (2) | 5,750 | 15th |
| 12 April 1986 | Charlton Athletic | A | 0–3 | | 4,143 | 17th |
| 15 April 1986 | Blackburn Rovers | A | 1–0 | Cork | 5,183 | 15th |
| 19 April 1986 | Brighton & Hove Albion | H | 1–0 | Shearer | 5,469 | 12th |
| 26 April 1986 | Fulham | A | 1–2 | Shearer | 2,877 | 16th |
| 3 May 1986 | Wimbledon | H | 0–1 | | 6,083 | 16th |

=== FA Cup ===
| Date | Round | Opponents | Home/ Away | Result F–A | Scorers | Attendance |
|---|---|---|---|---|---|---|
| 4 January 1986 | Round 3 | Reading | H | 0–0 | | 9,875 |
| 13 January 1986 | Round 3 Replay | Reading | A | 1–2 | Cowling | 8,726 |

=== League Cup ===
| Date | Round | Opponents | Home/ Away | Result F–A | Scorers | Attendance |
|---|---|---|---|---|---|---|
| 23 September 1985 | Round 2 1st Leg | Shrewsbury Town | A | 3–2 | J. Jones, Curran, Tempest | 2,251 |
| 7 October 1985 | Round 2 2nd Leg | Shrewsbury Town | H | 0–2 | | 4,966: Huddersfield lost 4–3 on aggregate. |

== Appearances and goals ==
| Name | Nationality | Position | League | | FA Cup | | League Cup | | Total | |
| Name | Nationality | Position | Apps | Goals | Apps | Goals | Apps | Goals | Apps | Goals |
|---|---|---|---|---|---|---|---|---|---|---|
| Ian Bray | Wales | DF | 32 | 1 | 2 | 0 | 2 | 0 | 36 | 1 |
| Malcolm Brown | England | DF | 36 (1) | 0 | 2 | 0 | 0 | 0 | 38 (1) | 0 |
| Peter Butler | England | MF | 0 (1) | 0 | 0 | 0 | 0 | 0 | 0 (1) | 0 |
| David Cork | England | FW | 37 (1) | 8 | 0 (1) | 0 | 2 | 0 | 39 (2) | 8 |
| David Cowling | England | MF | 39 | 6 | 2 | 1 | 2 | 0 | 43 | 7 |
| Brian Cox | England | GK | 37 | 0 | 2 | 0 | 2 | 0 | 41 | 0 |
| Terry Curran | England | MF | 33 (1) | 7 | 0 | 0 | 2 | 1 | 35 (1) | 8 |
| Steve Doyle | Wales | MF | 42 | 0 | 2 | 0 | 2 | 0 | 46 | 0 |
| Joey Jones | Wales | DF | 38 | 1 | 2 | 0 | 2 | 1 | 42 | 2 |
| Paul Jones | England | DF | 14 | 0 | 0 | 0 | 2 | 0 | 16 | 0 |
| Keith Mason | England | GK | 5 | 0 | 0 | 0 | 0 | 0 | 5 | 0 |
| Paul Raynor | England | MF | 20 (10) | 5 | 2 | 0 | 0 | 0 | 22 (10) | 5 |
| Liam Robinson | England | FW | 0 (1) | 0 | 0 | 0 | 0 | 0 | 0 (1) | 0 |
| Duncan Shearer | Scotland | FW | 7 (1) | 7 | 0 | 0 | 0 | 0 | 7 (1) | 7 |
| Brian Stanton | England | MF | 7 (6) | 1 | 2 | 0 | 0 (1) | 0 | 9 (7) | 1 |
| Dale Tempest | England | FW | 29 (1) | 12 | 2 | 0 | 2 | 1 | 33 (1) | 13 |
| Simon Webster | England | DF | 41 | 2 | 2 | 0 | 2 | 0 | 45 | 2 |
| Paul Wilson | England | DF | 7 | 0 | 0 | 0 | 0 | 0 | 7 | 0 |
| Phil Wilson | England | MF | 35 | 1 | 2 | 0 | 2 | 0 | 39 | 1 |
| Julian Winter | England | MF | 3 (1) | 0 | 0 | 0 | 0 | 0 | 3 (1) | 0 |
