= Ian Wadsworth =

English footballer

Personal information
- Full name: Ian Jack Wadsworth
- Date of birth: 24 September 1966 (age 60)
- Place of birth: Huddersfield, England
- Position: Striker

Senior career*
Years	Team	Apps	(Gls)
1984–1985	Huddersfield Town	1	(0)
1985–1986	Doncaster Rovers	2	(0)
- * Club domestic league appearances and goals

Ian Jack Wadsworth (born 24 September 1966 in Huddersfield) is a former professional footballer, who played for Huddersfield Town and Doncaster Rovers. He now has links to the newly formed Holmfirth Town F.C.
