= Maurice Cox =

English footballer

Personal information
- Full name: Maurice Cox
- Date of birth: 1 October 1959 (age 67)
- Place of birth: Torquay, England
- Position: Forward

Youth career
- Cambridge University

Senior career*
Years	Team	Apps	(Gls)
1979–1982	Torquay United	62	(13)
1982	Huddersfield Town	4	(1)
1982–1983	Falmouth Town		
- * Club domestic league appearances and goals

Maurice Cox (born 1 October 1959) is an English former professional footballer who played as a striker for Torquay United and Huddersfield Town. While a student at Christ's College, Cambridge, he scored the fastest goal at the old Wembley Stadium, scoring on goalkeeper Anthony Eastland after 20 seconds in the 1979 Varsity match against Oxford University.

Cox joined Torquay United as a junior and remained on the club's books while a student at Cambridge University, making his debut on 3 November 1979 as a substitute for Peter Coffill in the 1–1 draw away to Scunthorpe United. He played nine times that season, scoring twice in the penultimate game of the season against Halifax Town and once in the final game, a 5–2 defeat at home to Lincoln City. He played sporadically in the first part of the following season, but played every game from the 2–0 win at home to Rochdale on 14 February until the end of the season.

He played more regularly the following season, finally signing professional for Torquay in January 1982, totalling 13 goals in 62 league games before a free transfer move to Huddersfield Town in August 1982 on non-contract terms. He left Huddersfield after playing only 4 games, leaving league football behind him. He played the 1982–83 season for Falmouth Town in The Western League making 33 appearances and scoring 17 goals.

His father Geoff was also a professional footballer and also played for Torquay United.
