= Lee Cowling =

English footballer

Personal information
- Full name: Lee David Cowling
- Date of birth: 22 September 1977 (age 49)
- Place of birth: Doncaster, England
- Positions: Left back; winger

Youth career
- 1993–1994: Manchester United
- 1994–1998: Nottingham Forest

Senior career*
Years	Team	Apps	(Gls)
1998–1999	Nottingham Forest	2	(0)
1998–1999	→Burton Albion (loan)	14	(1)
1999–2000	Mansfield Town		
2000–2002	Kettering Town F.C.	63	(6)
2002–????	King's Lynn	48	(3)

International career
	England U18	6	(0)
	England U17	3	
	England U16	6	
- * Club domestic league appearances and goals

Lee David Cowling (born 22 September 1977, in Doncaster, England) is an English former professional footballer who played in the Football League as a defender for Nottingham Forest and Mansfield Town.

== Playing career ==
Born in Doncaster, Cowling started his career as a trainee at Manchester United, after they spotted him playing junior league football in Doncaster for Bessacarr Green Eagles, beating Sheffield Wednesday Leeds Utd and Arsenal to his signature. After numerous appearances alongside players such as David Beckham, Paul Scholes and the Neville brothers, Lee felt his best opportunities laid elsewhere. Tempted by Brian Clough and Nottingham Foresthe joined the Reds at the City Ground. Lee was considered a top talent and a highly rated prospect. His time playing at Nottingham Forest saw the reigns of Brian Clough, Frank Clark, Stuart Pearce, Ron Atkinson and Dave Bassett. Lee captained their youth team, and made a handful of senior appearances, as well as being part of the England schoolboy setup alongside players such as Frank Lampard, Rio Ferdinand and Emile Heskey. He also represented England in the Under-18 squad. A serious recurring knee injury forced Lee to reconsider his career at an early age. After an enjoyable season with Mansfield Town, the club at which his father Dave Cowling started his career, his reoccurring knee injury forced him to retire in his twenties. He later signed for non-league Kettering in 2000, where he made 63 appearances in two seasons with the club and also enjoyed stints at Darlington FC, Harrogate Town, and Kings Lynn.

== Coaching career ==
In September 2014, Cowling joined Doncaster Rovers as an academy coach, where he spent four years. As of 2019, he works in association with Fulham FC delivering a youth development scheme which as seen Fulham expand into countries such as Spain, South Africa, the United States, and Japan. with his company ProcampsUK.

== Private life ==
His father is ex-football player Dave Cowling
