= Kevin M. Nagle =

American businessman, investor, and philanthropist

Kevin Michael Nagle
- Born: September 15, 1954 (age 71); Moorhead, Minnesota, United States
- Education: California State University, Long Beach; University of Southern California; UCLA Anderson School of Management
- Children: 2

Kevin Michael Nagle (born September 15, 1954) is an American businessman, investor, and philanthropist who was the co-founder and chief executive officer of EnvisionRx, a health care and pharmacy benefit management (PBM) company, from October 2001 to March 2014. He is the chairman and CEO of Sacramento Republic FC, a USL Championship club seeking to join Major League Soccer (MLS), and an investor in the Sacramento Kings of the National Basketball Association (NBA). On June 22, 2023 he acquired ownership of EFL club Huddersfield Town A.F.C.

== Early life and education ==
Nagle was born in Moorhead, Minnesota, raised by a single mother in Long Beach, California, along with his two older sisters. His family spent most of his early life in borderline poverty conditions, barely able to pay for basic living expenses. Nagle’s entrepreneurial spirit became evident at the early age of six, when he started collecting golf balls at a nearby course and selling them to golfers for a profit.

Nagle went on to earn a Bachelor’s in Political Science and Speech Communication from California State University, Long Beach; a Master’s in Business and Public Administration, from the University of Southern California; and an Executive Management Certificate in Medical Marketing from the UCLA Anderson School of Management.

== Business career ==
=== Health care entrepreneur ===
Nagle began his career briefly as an investment banker with EF Hutton before discovering a passion for health care. In 1980, he joined The Upjohn Company (later acquired by Pfizer), where he would spend the next thirteen years in various management positions. In 1994, he joined Foundation Health Systems and co-founded Integrated Pharmaceutical Services (IPS). After serving in several senior leadership positions, Nagle left IPS in 1999 to co-found HMN Health Services, Inc.

In 2001, Nagle became Co-Founder and Chief Executive Officer of Envision Pharmaceutical Holdings, Inc. The company is credited as the first transparent PBM and pioneered crediting drug manufacturer rebates, administrative fees and other discounts directly to payers and consumers at the point of sale. Nagle and his partners, including TPG, sold Envision to Rite Aid in 2015 for $2.3 billion. In March 2014, Nagle voluntarily stepped down as CEO, staying on as Vice Chairman of the Board of Directors until the closing of the sale to Rite Aid.

=== Business ventures and investments ===
Nagle owns all or significant holdings in several real estate and financial ventures:

- The Nagle Company, a real estate development company whose holdings include El Dorado Hills Town Center, a mixed-use retail and entertainment center located 20 miles east of Sacramento; the Ice Blocks, a 172,000 square foot retail, office and residential development project in midtown Sacramento; and other real estate holdings. Estimated at a rough vaulue of $1.9Billion
- Moneta Ventures, a Folsom-based venture capital firm that invests in early stage companies in the health care, software, IT services and other technology sectors. Estimated roughly at $3.5 Billion.
- Jaguar Ventures, a Sacramento-based venture capital fund focused on health care and technology with plans to establish the largest venture capital fund in Sacramento, valued in excess of $100 million.

== Sports ownership ==
=== Sacramento Kings and Golden 1 Center ===
Nagle is a minority owner (and the largest Sacramento-based owner) of the Sacramento Kings. From 2011 – 2013, Nagle was instrumental in marshaling the Sacramento business community behind then-Sacramento Mayor Kevin Johnson’s efforts to prevent the relocation of the Kings. In May 2011, Nagle joined with Mayor Johnson to raise $10 million in corporate sponsorships in only ten days, effectively countering claims that Sacramento lacked a sufficient corporate base to continue to support an NBA team. The sponsorships helped persuade the Kings ownership and NBA to opt against relocating the team to Anaheim for the 2012-2013 season and give Sacramento more time to develop a viable plan to build a new arena for the team.

In January 2013, Kings ownership announced plans to sell the Kings to an investment group led by hedge-fund manager Chris Hansen and Microsoft CEO Steve Ballmer and relocate the franchise to Seattle, Washington. In response, Nagle reprised his leadership role with Mayor Johnson, once again rallying corporate support for the team to stay in Sacramento. In addition, Nagle joined a new investor group led by technology entrepreneur Vivek Ranadive willing to purchase the team, develop a new arena, and keep the franchise in Sacramento. On the strength of this proposal, the NBA Board of Governors voted against relocation in May 2013. The Ranadive group subsequently purchased the team for a then-record valuation of $5.34 billion, and developed the acclaimed Golden 1 Center and Downtown Commons credited with jumpstarting the revitalization of downtown Sacramento.

=== Sacramento Republic FC and Major League Soccer bid ===
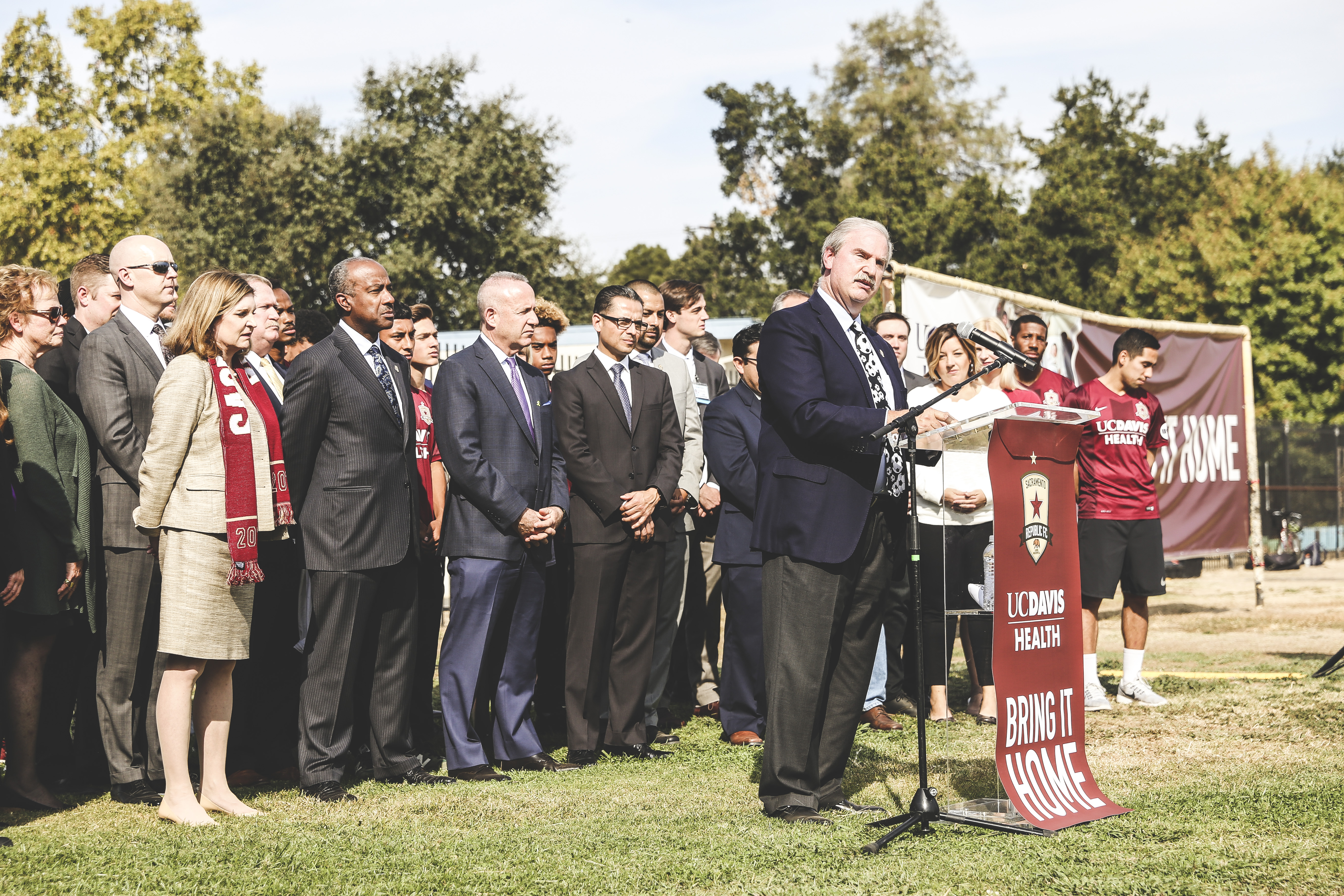
Kevin Nagle in 2017 representing civic and business leaders in support of Major League Soccer expansion to Sacramento

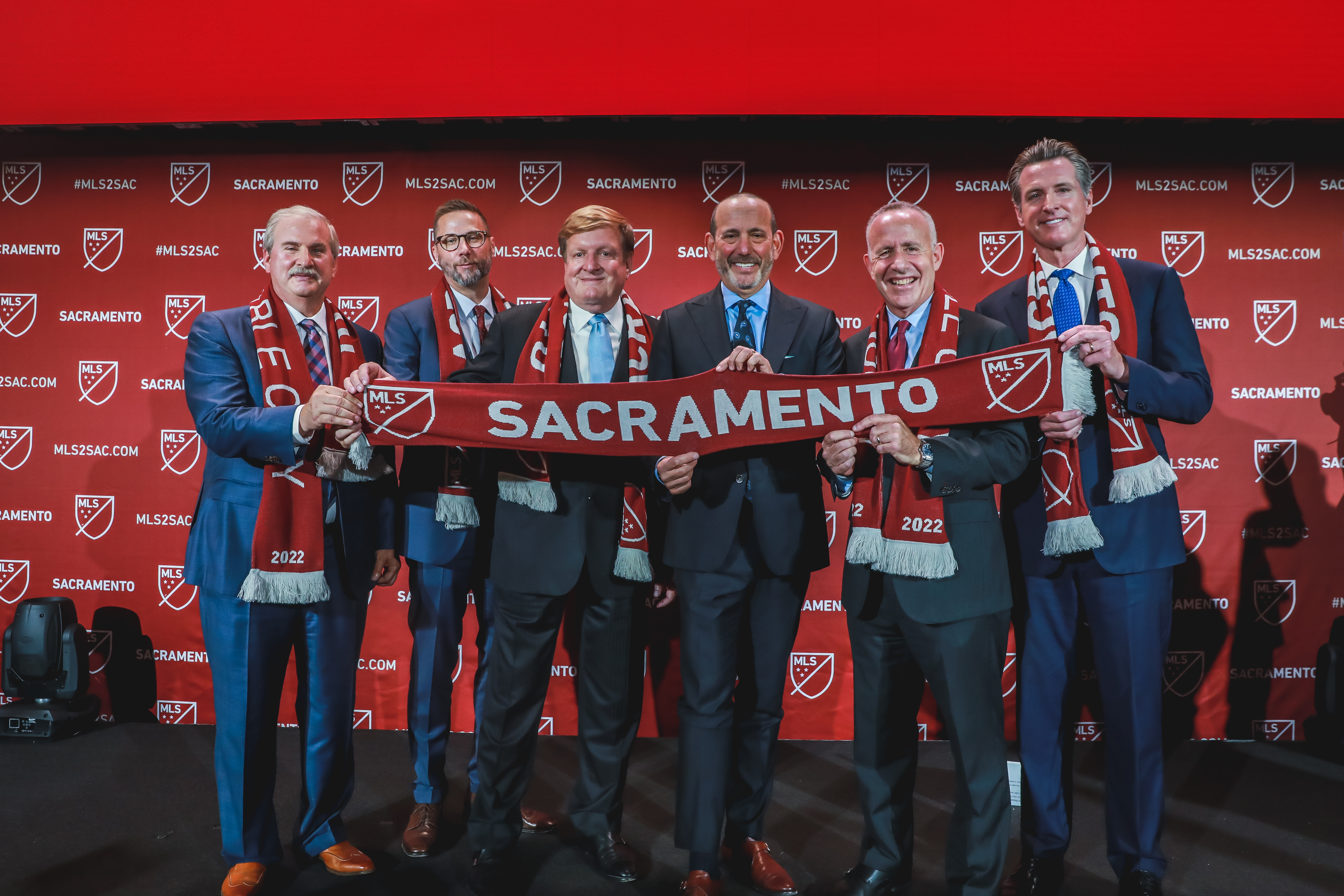
Kevin Nagle, Matt Alvarez, Ron Burkle, MLS Commissioner Don Garber, Sacramento Mayor Darrell Steinberg and California Governor Gavin Newsom at the MLS to Sacramento press conference.

Nagle is Chairman and CEO of Sac Soccer & Entertainment Holdings (SSEH) the parent company of Sacramento Republic FC, a men’s professional soccer team in the United Soccer League (USL).

Since 2014, Nagle has led Republic FC’s bid to join Major League Soccer (MLS), personally investing millions to acquire Republic FC, fund predevelopment of a new MLS stadium at the downtown Sacramento Railyards, and complete the formal expansion application process with MLS. During this time, Republic FC’s rabid fan base has consistently broken league records for attendance and revenues to showcase the community’s strong support for soccer. In July 2017, Nagle announced plans to begin construction of the stadium in advance of an MLS award in an effort to demonstrate the maturity of SSEH’s stadium plans and depth of commitment to MLS.

As a result of these efforts, Sacramento was awarded an MLS expansion team in October 2019 with Sacramento Republic FC becoming the league's 29th team and beginning play in MLS in 2022. Plans called for construction of a new, $300 million, 20,100-seat soccer stadium in the downtown Railyards District. In addition to Nagle, the club's ownership group included investor Ron Burkle, an owner of the Pittsburgh Penguins, as well as the entertainment executive Matt Alvarez.

On February 26, 2021, Burkle announced that he was pulling out his interests in Major League Soccer expansion club in Sacramento due to the COVID-19 pandemic. This move placed Sacramento expansion hopes in doubt. Nagle and Sacramento Mayor Darrell Steinberg pledged to seek out a new lead investor and continue the city’s bid to join Major League Soccer by 2023.

=== NRG Esports ===
In 2017, Nagle became an investor in NRG Esports, an esports organization founded in December 2015 by Gerard Kelly and Nagle’s fellow Kings minority owners Andy Miller and Mark Mastrov. Other investors include Jennifer Lopez, Alex Rodriguez, Shaquille O’Neal, Marshawn Lynch, and Michael Strahan. The team will compete in the Overwatch League, a creation of Kotick and Activision Blizzard.

=== Huddersfield Town ===
On 29 March 2023 it was announced that Nagle was the buyer behind a takeover of English Football League Championship club Huddersfield Town. Nagle bought 100% of the shares from previous owner Dean Hoyle, and the deal was expected to be formally approved over the course of the next few months. The takeover deal was fully completed on 22 June 2023.

== Awards and accolades ==
- The Sacramento Business Journal voted Nagle as one of the region's top leaders and executives of the year in 2012, 2013, and 2014. In 2015, he was named Executive of the Year.
- He was inducted in the Long Beach City College Hall of Fame in 2015 and received the highest alumni honor from California State University, Long Beach (CSULB), the Distinguished Alumni Award, in 2016.
- Nagle was presented with the Beacon of HOPE award recognizing his commitment to St. HOPE in 2016.
- Nagle was knighted by the Royal Order of Constantine the Great and Saint Helen in Los Angeles in September 2018.
- Positive Coaching Alliance - Sacramento gave Nagle the Triple-Impact Professional Award in November 2018.
- United Cerebral Palsy (UCP) of Sacramento and Northern California announced the selection of Nagle as its 2019 Humanitarian of the Year.
- Center for Fathers and Families (CFF) Sacramento awarded Nagle with the "Father of the Year" award in June 2019.
- Nagle was named as “Sacramentan of the Year” in 2019 by the Sacramento Metropolitan Chamber of Commerce
- Honorary Doctor of Humane Letters recipient in 2020 from California State University, Sacramento
- Honorary Doctorate, Saint Mary’s College of California, Expected May 2021

== Civic and philanthropic activities ==
Nagle is a Trustee at Saint Mary’s College of California and serves as Chair of the Board. Nagle also serves on the Board of Advisors for UC Davis School of Medicine and is a Founding Member of Greater Sacramento Economic Council.

In 2022, two graduating seniors from Saint Mary’s College of California started a petition to replace Nagle as that years’ commencement speaker, citing Nagle’s 2019 donation of over $35,000 to the "Trump Victory" campaign. In that same year, he also donated $8,300 to the campaign of QANON supporter Susan Collins.

He also served as a Board Member (Chairman of Finance Committee) of the St. HOPE Public Schools in Sacramento, 2011's Charter School of the Year (PS7).

Nagle supports numerous philanthropic causes, and has been instrumental in major fundraising campaigns for the St. Hope Foundation and Cristo Rey Sacramento.

As part of his support for UCP, Nagle set a new chapter fundraising record of over $480,000 from its annual dinner in May 2019 with nearly 700 attendees. UCP of Sacramento and Northern California is the region’s leading provider of comprehensive services to children and adults with developmental disabilities, serving 5,730 individuals per month in an eight-county area.

== Personal life ==
He resides in El Dorado Hills, California and has two daughters, Lindsay and Haley.
