= Mike Carmody =

English footballer

Personal information
- Full name: Michael Joseph Carmody
- Date of birth: 9 February 1966 (age 60)
- Place of birth: Huddersfield, England
- Position: Midfielder

Senior career*
Years	Team	Apps	(Gls)
1984–1985	Huddersfield Town	8	(0)
1985–1986	Emley		
1986	Tranmere Rovers	2	(0)
1986–1992	Emley		
1992–2000	Altrincham	208	(4)
1999–2000	→ Ashton United (Loan)		
2000–2001	Ashton United		
2005–2007	Brodsworth Miners Welfare		
- * Club domestic league appearances and goals as of 19 September 2007

Michael Joseph Carmody (born 9 February 1966 in Huddersfield) is an English former professional footballer who played as a midfielder for Huddersfield Town and Tranmere Rovers in the Football League.

== Playing career ==
Carmody began his career at non-League Emley, before signing for Huddersfield Town in the 1984–85 season. After making eight appearances, he returned to Emley for the 1985–86 season. He subsequently signed for Tranmere Rovers, making two appearances in the 1986–87 season, before returning to Emley again. He played for the club in the 1988 FA Vase final, before following Emley manager Gerry Quinn to Altrincham in 1992. He was appointed captain in 1994, and made 255 appearances for the club over eight years. He was loaned to Ashton United (then managed by Quinn) during the 1999–2000 season, before signing for the club permanently. He later played for Brodsworth Miners Welfare and Armthorpe Welfare.
