= Tim Hotte =

English footballer

Timothy Hotte
Personal information
- Full name: Timothy Alwin Hotte
- Date of birth: 4 October 1963 (age 63)
- Place of birth: Bradford, England
- Position: Forward

Youth career
- Arsenal

Senior career*
Years	Team	Apps	(Gls)
1981–1983	Huddersfield Town	16	(4)
1983–1985	Harrogate Town		
1985–1986	Halifax Town	4	(0)
1986–1987	North Ferriby United		
1987–1988	Hull City	4	(0)
1988	→ York City (loan)	2	(0)
Total		26	(4)
- * Club domestic league appearances and goals

Timothy Alwin Hotte (born 4 October 1963) is an English former footballer who played in the Football League for Huddersfield Town, Halifax Town, Hull City and York City.

== Note ==
- 99 Years & Counting – Stats & Stories – Huddersfield Town History
