= Joey Jones =

Welsh footballer (1955–2025)

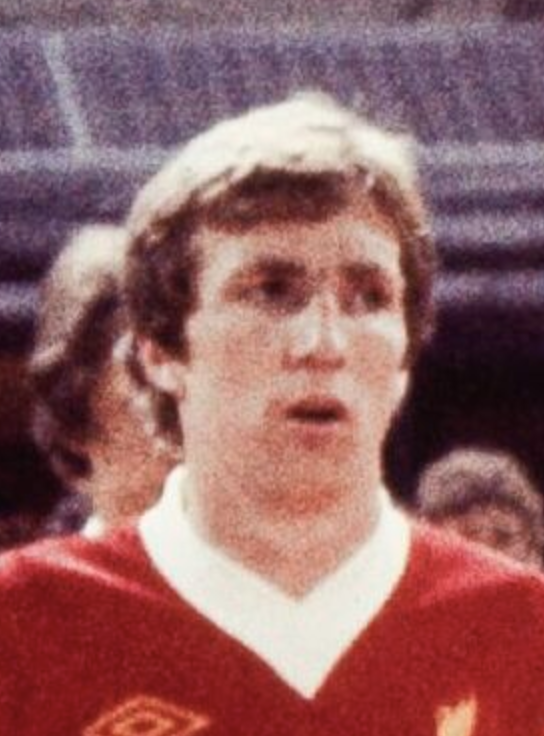
- Jones with Liverpool F.C. in 1977

Personal information
- Full name: Joseph Patrick Jones
- Date of birth: 4 March 1955
- Place of birth: Llandudno, Wales
- Date of death: 22 July 2025 (aged 70)
- Height: 5 ft 10 in (1.78 m)
- Position: Left-back

Senior career*
Years	Team	Apps	(Gls)
1973–1975	Wrexham	98	(2)
1975–1978	Liverpool	72	(3)
1978–1982	Wrexham	146	(6)
1982–1985	Chelsea	78	(2)
1985–1987	Huddersfield Town	68	(3)
1987–1992	Wrexham	132	(11)
Total		594	(27)

International career
	Wales U23	4	(0)
1975–1986	Wales	72	(1)

Managerial career
- 2001: Wrexham (caretaker)
- * Club domestic league appearances and goals

Joseph Patrick Jones (4 March 1955 – 22 July 2025) was a Welsh footballer who played as a full-back.

Jones most notably played for Liverpool, with whom he won two European Cups. He is also known for his long association with Wrexham, playing for the club in three separate stints, and was involved in the coaching set-up on-and-off from the early 1990s, including a brief spell as caretaker manager in 2001. Internationally, he represented Wales on 72 occasions from 1975 to 1986.

== Club career ==
=== Wrexham ===
Jones was born in Llandudno on 4 March 1955, and joined Wrexham in 1971. He made his debut at the age of 17 in a Welsh Cup tie against local rivals Chester City; Wrexham lost 1–0. He did, however, win the Welsh Cup with the club in 1975, when they beat Cardiff City in the final. Jones established himself as a right-back and helped Wrexham to the quarter-finals of the FA Cup in 1974, the first time the club had reached that stage.

=== Liverpool ===
Jones left Wrexham to join his boyhood heroes, Liverpool (he had a Liverbird tattoo, which he later had removed for medical reasons, on his forearm), when Bob Paisley paid £110,000 for his services in July 1975. He made his debut on 16 August in a 2–0 league defeat to Queens Park Rangers at Loftus Road. He missed out on a league championship medal in 1975–76, as he did not play enough matches to qualify.

In 1977, Jones was part of the treble-chasing Liverpool team which won the League championship and European Cup and reached the FA Cup Final. Jones scored his first goal for the club on 9 November 1976 in the 5–1 league win against Leicester City at Anfield. The treble, unprecedented in English football, was not forthcoming. Liverpool lost 2–1 in the FA Cup final at Wembley to Manchester United, though Jones supplied the accurate long pass for Jimmy Case to score Liverpool's goal. However, Jones became the first Welshman to receive a European Cup winners medal when Liverpool won their first European Cup in Rome four days later, defeating Borussia Mönchengladbach 3–1. A memorable banner was unfurled by Liverpool supporters at the European Cup final in Rome which said "Joey Ate The Frogs Legs, Made The Swiss Roll, Now He's Munching Gladbach".

Jones was in and out of the side the following year, with the renaissance of Tommy Smith and the emergence of young Scottish defender Alan Hansen severely reducing his first team opportunities. He left in the summer of 1978 after exactly 100 appearances, in which he scored 3 goals.

=== Return to Wrexham ===
Jones returned to Wrexham in 1978 for £210,000, a record that stood as Wrexham's record signing, until the £300,000 signing of Ollie Palmer in January 2022.

=== Chelsea ===
In 1982, Jones joined Chelsea for £34,000, having been signed by John Neal. Jones was sent off on his debut against Carlisle United at Brunton Park. However, Jones's committed attitude and pre-match fist-clenching ritual eventually made him a cult hero among the fans. He also proved instrumental in Chelsea's successful battle to avoid relegation to the Third Division. He was a part of the side which won promotion as Second Division champions on goal difference in 1983–84. He remained with the club in the top flight for one more season, before surprisingly being sold to Huddersfield Town for £35,000 in August 1985. He finished his Chelsea career with 78 league appearances and 2 goals.

=== Later career ===
He joined Huddersfield in the summer of 1985 from Chelsea, and was named Town's player of the year in his first season. After two seasons he left to re-join Wrexham, where he retired at the end of the 1991–92 season.

== International career ==
Joey made his Wales debut in November 1975 against Austria. He went on to win 72 caps, scoring one goal, his last action coming in a friendly away to Canada in May 1986. At the time of his death, Jones was 15th alongside Mark Hughes on the list of most capped players for Wales.

== Retirement and death ==
Jones underwent cardiac surgery in 2002 and later scaled down his commitments with Wrexham, where he worked as the Under 18's and Reserve team coach until his retirement in 2017. He returned to the club in the position of youth team ambassador in 2021. In 2001, he had a brief spell as caretaker manager between the departure of Brian Flynn and arrival of Denis Smith.

In 2005, Jones completed his autobiography entitled Oh Joey, Joey! about his life in football. This was a book of the week on Sky Sports News in February 2006.

Also in 2005, Jones was named as Wrexham's ultimate Cult Hero on BBC's Football Focus. Jones was much respected by Liverpool supporters and he finished in 63rd place in the 2006 poll of all-time favourite Liverpool players (100 Players who shook the Kop). 110,000 fans worldwide had taken part in the vote.

Jones died of undisclosed causes on 22 July 2025, at the age of 70.

== Honours ==
Wrexham

- Welsh Cup: 1974–75

Liverpool

- Football League First Division: 1975–76, 1976–77
- European Cup: 1976–77, 1977–78
- UEFA Cup: 1975–76
- European Super Cup: 1977
- FA Cup runner-up: 1976–77

Chelsea

- Football League Second Division: 1983–84

Individual

- Chelsea Player of the Year: 1982–83
- Huddersfield Town Player of the Year: 1985–86
- PFA Team of the Year: 1988–89 Fourth Division
