= Dale Tempest =

English-born Hong Kong footballer (born 1963)

Personal information
- Full name: Dale Michael Tempest
- Date of birth: 30 December 1963 (age 62)
- Place of birth: Leeds, England
- Position: Striker

Senior career*
Years	Team	Apps	(Gls)
1980–1984	Fulham	34	(6)
1984–1986	Huddersfield Town	65	(27)
1985	→ Gillingham (loan)	9	(4)
1986–1987	Lokeren	27	(4)
1987–1989	Colchester United	77	(18)
1989–1991	South China	34	(26)
1991–1993	Eastern	36	(34)
1993	Kitchee	3	(2)
1993–1996	Eastern	45	(32)
1996–1998	South China	?	(15)

International career
1996–1998	Hong Kong	6	(2)
- * Club domestic league appearances and goals

Dale Michael Tempest (Chinese: 譚拔士, born 30 December 1963) is a former professional footballer. Born in England, he played for several English teams including Fulham, Huddersfield Town, Gillingham and Colchester United before arriving in Hong Kong in 1989 where he played for four clubs in nine years. He also represented the Hong Kong national team at international level, making six appearances and scoring two goals between 1996 and 1998.

== Career ==
=== Early years ===
Tempest was born in Leeds. He went to school in Bracknell, Berkshire at Garth Hill Comprehensive, leaving in 1980 to sign for Fulham.

=== Career in Hong Kong ===
Tempest arrived in Hong Kong in 1989 and played for South China. He moved to Eastern but later returned to South China. He was the top scorer in the Hong Kong First Division League on a record five occasions (1989–90, 1990–91, 1992–93, 1993–94, 1994–95). Probably his most memorable match among Hong Kong football fans came in a friendly between South China and São Paulo FC, when Tempest scored three goals and helped South China win 4–2.

== International career ==
In 1997, having granted permanent resident status by the Hong Kong Government, he represented Hong Kong at international level and played in the 1998 Fifa World Cup qualifiers against South Korea and Thailand. He also scored a goal against Japan during the 1998 Dynasty Cup.

== Recent years ==
Tempest now works as a betting expert for Sky Sports in the UK.

Preceded by Chan Fat Chi	Hong Kong First Division League top scorer 1989–90; 1990–91	Succeeded by Steve Neville
Preceded by Steve Neville	Hong Kong First Division League top scorer 1992–93; 1993–94; 1994–95	Succeeded by Paul Foster
