= Roy Greenwood (footballer, born 1952) =

English footballer

Personal information
- Full name: Roy Greenwood
- Date of birth: 26 September 1952 (age 74)
- Place of birth: Leeds, England
- Position: Winger

Youth career
- Hull City

Senior career*
Years	Team	Apps	(Gls)
1971–1975	Hull City	126	(24)
1975–1978	Sunderland	56	(9)
1978–1980	Derby County	31	(1)
1980–1982	Swindon Town	53	(7)
1982–1984	Huddersfield Town	8	(0)
1983–1984	→ Tranmere Rovers (loan)	3	(1)
–	Scarborough		
Total		277	(42)
- * Club domestic league appearances and goals

Roy Greenwood (born 26 September 1952) is an English former professional footballer who played as a winger in the Football League for Hull City, Sunderland, Derby County, Swindon Town, Huddersfield Town and Tranmere Rovers in the 1970s and 1980s. He was regarded as a ‘Journeyman’ player.

== Honours ==
Hull City

- Watney Cup runner-up: 1973
