= Colin Russell (footballer) =

English footballer (born 1961)

Personal information
- Full name: Colin Russell
- Date of birth: 21 January 1961 (age 65)
- Place of birth: Liverpool, England
- Height: 5 ft 7 in (1.70 m)
- Position: Striker

Youth career
- Liverpool

Senior career*
Years	Team	Apps	(Gls)
1977–1982	Liverpool	1	(0)
1982–1984	Huddersfield Town	66	(23)
1983–1984	→ Stoke City (loan)	11	(2)
1984–1986	AFC Bournemouth	68	(14)
1986–1988	Doncaster Rovers	43	(5)
1988	Scarborough	13	(2)
1988	Wigan Athletic	8	(3)
1988–1990	Colne Dynamoes		
–	Bangor City		
–	Morecambe		
–	Droylsden		
–	Warrington Town		
Total		210	(49)
- * Club domestic league appearances and goals

Colin Russell (born 21 January 1961) is an English former professional footballer who played in the Football League as a striker for Liverpool, Huddersfield Town, Stoke City, AFC Bournemouth, Doncaster Rovers, Scarborough and Wigan Athletic.

== Career ==
Russell began his career as an apprentice with home-town club Liverpool, before signing professional terms at 18. Russell was part of Roy Evans' Central League champions side from 1979 to 1982 and frequently captained the side. He made his debut, and his only appearance for Liverpool's first team, on 2 May 1981 as the second-half substitute for Howard Gayle in a 1–0 defeat to Sunderland. In 1982 with the emergence of David Hodgson as Kenny Dalglish's understudy, Russell was transferred to Huddersfield Town where he enjoyed the most successful period of his career. He helped the Terriers gain promotion in 1982–83 scoring 16 league goals. Towards the end of 1983–84 Russell joined Stoke City on loan where he played 11 times scoring twice against former club Liverpool and Queens Park Rangers. The then went on to play for AFC Bournemouth, Doncaster Rovers and Scarborough followed before he ended his Football League career with Wigan Athletic in the 1988–89 season. After only a couple of months at Wigan, Russell moved into non-League football by joining former Liverpool teammate Alan Kennedy at Colne Dynamoes, at the time the only non-league side to offer lucrative contracts to their players. As the season got underway, financial hardship soon hit the club, and eventually the club folded. He went on play for Bangor City, Morecambe, Droylsden and Warrington Town.

== Career statistics ==
Appearances and goals by club, season and competition
Club	Season	League			FA Cup		League Cup		Other^{[A]}		Total	
Club	Season	Division	Apps	Goals	Apps	Goals	Apps	Goals	Apps	Goals	Apps	Goals
Liverpool	1980–81	First Division	1	0	0	0	0	0	0	0	1	0
Huddersfield Town	1982–83	Third Division	41	16	4	0	4	1	0	0	49	17
Huddersfield Town	1983–84	Second Division	25	7	1	0	6	1	0	0	32	8
Stoke City (loan)	1983–84	First Division	11	2	0	0	0	0	0	0	11	2
AFC Bournemouth	1984–85	Third Division	36	6	5	2	2	0	4	3	47	11
AFC Bournemouth	1985–86	Third Division	32	8	4	0	4	2	0	0	40	10
Doncaster Rovers	1986–87	Third Division	37	5	3	1	1	1	2	0	43	7
Doncaster Rovers	1987–88	Third Division	6	0	0	0	2	0	1	0	9	0
Scarborough	1987–88	Fourth Division	13	2	1	0	0	0	0	0	14	2
Wigan Athletic	1988–89	Third Division	8	3	0	0	2	0	0	0	10	3
Career total			210	49	18	3	21	5	7	3	256	60

A. The "Other" column constitutes appearances and goals in the Football League Trophy.
