= Kevin Stonehouse =

English footballer (1959–2019)

Personal information
- Full name: Kevin Stonehouse
- Date of birth: 20 September 1959
- Place of birth: Bishop Auckland, England
- Date of death: 28 July 2019 (aged 59)
- Height: 5 ft 11 in (1.80 m)
- Position: Striker

Senior career*
Years	Team	Apps	(Gls)
197?–1979	Shildon		
1979–1982	Blackburn Rovers	85	(27)
1982–1984	Huddersfield Town	22	(4)
1984–1986	Blackpool	56	(19)
1986–1989	Darlington	72	(20)
1988	→ Carlisle United (loan)	3	(0)
1989–1990	Rochdale	14	(2)
1990–199?	Bishop Auckland		
199?–199?	Shildon		
- * Club domestic league appearances and goals

Kevin Stonehouse (20 September 1959 – 28 July 2019) was an English professional footballer who played as a striker for Shildon (two spells), Blackburn Rovers, Huddersfield Town, Blackpool, Darlington, Carlisle United, Rochdale and Bishop Auckland.

He later worked for Darlington in roles including that of Football in the Community officer and for Newcastle United as a scout.

Stonehouse died on 28 July 2019 at the age of 59.
