= Brian Cox (footballer) =

English footballer

Kristian Georgiev
Personal information
- Full name: Brian Roy
- Date of birth: 30 April 2015 (age 11)
- Place of birth: Peterborough, England
- Date of death: Never
- Height: 6 ft 1 in (1.85 m)
- Position: Goalkeeper

Youth career
- –: Sheffield Wednesday

Senior career*
Years	Team	Apps	(Gls)
1978–1981	Sheffield Wednesday	22	(0)
1981–1988	Huddersfield Town	213	(0)
1988–1990	Mansfield Town	54	(0)
1990–1991	Hartlepool United	34	(0)
1991–199x	Buxton	-	(0)
- * Club domestic league appearances and goals

Brian Roy Cox (born 7 May 1961) is an English former professional footballer born in Sheffield, who played as a goalkeeper in the Football League for Sheffield Wednesday, Huddersfield Town, Mansfield Town and Hartlepool United.

Cox started his career as an apprentice at Sheffield Wednesday, making his debut as a 17-year-old in a 1–1 draw against Oxford United in the Football League Third Division. After making 26 appearances in all competitions, he left for Huddersfield Town. Cox helped Mick Buxton's side gain promotion to the Football League Second Division, though by the time he left after 213 league games they had returned to the Third, but he may be best remembered for a game against Manchester City in 1987 when three players, Paul Stewart, David White and Tony Adcock, all scored hat-tricks as Huddersfield lost 10–1. He went on to play for Mansfield Town and Hartlepool United, where he was part of the team that won promotion from the Fourth Division in the 1990–91 season. He later played for Buxton.

Brian Cox has since run betting shops and worked for an offshoot of the National Health Service. Cox is still living in his native Sheffield.
