= Graham Cooper (footballer, born 1962) =

English footballer

Personal information
- Full name: Graham Cooper
- Date of birth: 22 May 1962 (age 64)
- Place of birth: Huddersfield, England
- Height: 5 ft 10 in (1.78 m)
- Position: Midfielder

Senior career*
Years	Team	Apps	(Gls)
1983–1988	Huddersfield Town	74	(13)
1988–1991	Wrexham	63	(16)
1990	→ York City (loan)	2	(0)
1991	Northwich Victoria		
1991–1992	Halifax Town	39	(4)
- * Club domestic league appearances and goals

Graham Cooper (born 22 May 1962) is an English former professional footballer who played as a midfielder for Huddersfield Town before moving to Wrexham for a fee of £25,000 in 1987. He had a loan spell with York City before joining Halifax Town in January 1991. He was released by Halifax in May 1992 having played just twice for the Shaymen.

He later played for Lepton Highlanders in the Huddersfield District League.

In 2001, he was named Man of the Match in the Herald Cup Final as played for Kingsteignton Athletic against Paignton Villa at Plainmoor.

He currently plays for South Devon Football League side Hele rovers F.C. and in March 2008 was named in their squad for the 2008 Herald Cup Final against Buckland Athletic .
