= Daral Pugh =

Welsh footballer

Personal information
- Full name: Daral James Pugh
- Date of birth: 5 June 1961 (age 65)
- Place of birth: Crynant, Wales
- Height: 5 ft 8 in (1.73 m)
- Position: Midfielder

Team information
- Current team: Sheffield Wednesday (Academy Head of Coaching)

Senior career*
Years	Team	Apps	(Gls)
1977–1982	Doncaster Rovers	154	(15)
1982–1985	Huddersfield Town	85	(7)
1985–1988	Rotherham United	112	(5)
1988	→ Cambridge United (loan)	6	(1)
1988–1990	Torquay United	32	(0)
- Bridlington Town

International career
	Wales U21	2	
- * Club domestic league appearances and goals

Daral James Pugh (born 5 June 1961) is a Welsh former professional footballer who played as a midfielder. He is currently head of coaching for the Sheffield Wednesday academy.

== Playing career ==
During his playing career, Pugh played for Doncaster Rovers, Huddersfield Town, Rotherham United, Cambridge United, Torquay United and Bridlington Town.

== Coaching career ==
After retiring, Pugh replaced Jack Detchon (who crossed the pond to Kenyon College in the USA )as Wakefield District Council Football Development officer accompanied by Paul Gater and Shaun Selby within the Sports development team headed up by Chris Froggett, after leaving this position, Pugh then became under-18s coach at Leeds United, before becoming assistant academy manager after being replaced as under-18s manager by Neil Redfearn. However, due to restructuring at the club's academy, he, along with then academy manager Neil Thompson, was released in late October 2010.

On 1 July 2011, he was named head of youth at Bury.

In October 2013, Pugh was appointed head of academy coaching at Hull City.

On 5 August 2015, Pugh returned to Leeds United as the head of academy coaching, effectively replacing Redfearn. Also joining him from Hull City was coach John Anderson, who became Leeds' under-18s manager.

On 24 February 2017, Pugh was appointed as interim lead professional development phase coach at Rotherham United until the end of the season.

== Honours ==
Torquay United

- Associate Members' Cup runner-up: 1988–89
