= Keith Mason (footballer) =

English footballer

Personal information
- Full name: Keith Michael Mason
- Date of birth: 19 July 1958 (age 68)
- Place of birth: Leicester, England
- Height: 6 ft 0 in (1.83 m)
- Position: Goalkeeper

Senior career*
Years	Team	Apps	(Gls)
1981–1982	Leicester City	0	(0)
1982–1986	Huddersfield Town	30	(0)
- * Club domestic league appearances and goals

Keith Michael Mason (born 19 July 1958) is an English former professional footballer who played for Leicester City and Huddersfield Town.
