= David Cowling =

English footballer (born 1958)

Dave Cowling
Personal information
- Full name: David Roy Cowling
- Date of birth: 27 November 1958 (age 67)
- Place of birth: Doncaster, England
- Height: 5 ft 7 in (1.70 m)
- Position: Left winger

Youth career
- Mansfield Town

Senior career*
Years	Team	Apps	(Gls)
1976–1977	Mansfield Town	0	(0)
1978–1988	Huddersfield Town	340	(43)
1988	→ Scunthorpe United (loan)	1	(0)
1988	Reading	10	(1)
1988–1991	Scunthorpe United	89	(5)

Managerial career
- 1997: Doncaster Rovers
- 1998–1999: Goole
- * Club domestic league appearances and goals

David Roy Cowling (born 27 November 1958) is an English former professional footballer who played in the Football League as a left winger for Huddersfield Town, where he played 340 league games during the 1970s and 1980s. He also played for Scunthorpe United and Reading.

== Playing career ==
Born in Doncaster, Cowling started his career at Mansfield Town, but never appeared for their first team before moving to Huddersfield Town in 1977. He is particularly remembered for two goals he scored during the 1982–83 season: the winner against Leeds United in the Football League Cup, and the only goal of the game against Newport County which secured Huddersfield's promotion to the Second Division.

During his time at Huddersfield, Cowling was linked with moves to Manchester United and Leeds United on more than one occasion.

He later signed for Reading in 1988, before returning to Glanford Park.

== Managerial career ==
After his playing days, Cowling joined the coaching staff at Scunthorpe United. He then moved to Doncaster Rovers, where he coached the youth teams before taking over as first team manager in October 1997, a post which he resigned after ten days because of interference from the chairman, Ken Richardson, regarding team selection. He remained on the staff under Danny Bergara's management, but was laid off a few months later.

After a short stint at Goole AFC, and turning down management positions abroad in the United States and Sweden, Cowling went on to become director of youth at Bury, and youth development officer for Darlington F.C. a position he held whilst also working as director of football development at Darlington College. Here he established a soccer school in partnership with his son Lee, also a former professional footballer with Nottingham Forest. As of 2011, Cowling set up and runs a footballing academy based at the Keepmoat Stadium in Doncaster, England with his son Lee. The academy is the only one of its kind in the United Kingdom, providing formal education and footballing education to teenagers and young adults.

== Honours ==
Huddersfield Town

- Football League Fourth Division: 1979–80
