= Phil Wilson (footballer, born 1960) =

English footballer

Personal information
- Full name: Philip Wilson
- Date of birth: 16 October 1960 (age 66)
- Place of birth: Hemsworth, England
- Height: 5 ft 6 in (1.68 m)
- Position: Midfielder

Senior career*
Years	Team	Apps	(Gls)
1979–1981	Bolton Wanderers	39	(4)
1981–1987	Huddersfield Town	233	(16)
1987–1989	York City	46	(2)
1989	Macclesfield Town	16	(1)
1989–1991	Scarborough	43	(3)
?	Stafford Rangers	?	(?)
Total		377	(26)
- * Club domestic league appearances and goals

Philip Wilson (born 16 October 1960 in Hemsworth, West Yorkshire) is a former professional footballer, who played for Bolton Wanderers, Huddersfield Town, York City, Scarborough and Stafford Rangers.
