= Paul Jones (footballer, born May 1953) =

English footballer

Personal information
- Full name: Paul Bernard Jones
- Date of birth: 13 May 1953 (age 73)
- Place of birth: Ellesmere Port, England
- Height: 6 ft 1 in (1.85 m)
- Position: Defender

Youth career
- Bolton Wanderers

Senior career*
| Years | Team | Apps | (Gls) |
| 1970–1983 | Bolton Wanderers | 445 | (38) |
| 1983–1985 | Huddersfield Town | 73 | (8) |
| 1985–1987 | Oldham Athletic | 32 | (1) |
| 1987–1988 | Blackpool | 37 | (0) |
| 1988–1989 | Rochdale | 14 | (2) |
| 1989–1990 | Stockport County | 25 | (0) |
| Total | | 626 | (49) |
- * Club domestic league appearances and goals

Paul Bernard Jones (born 13 May 1953) is a former professional footballer who played as a defender in the Football League for Bolton Wanderers, where he spent most of his career, Huddersfield Town, Oldham Athletic, Blackpool, Rochdale and Stockport County. He was educated at Ellesmere Port Grammar school, where he was spotted by a Bolton scout; as were Barry Siddall and Neil Whatmore. Paul also made the Full England Squad in 1977 but did not make an appearance.

After his playing career ended he spent time scouting for former club Bolton Wanderers, Hull City and Crystal Palace and in 2009 completed a spell coaching in Hunan Province, China.
