= Mark Lillis =

English footballer (born 1960)

Personal information
- Full name: Mark Anthony Lillis
- Date of birth: 17 January 1960 (age 66)
- Place of birth: Manchester, England
- Height: 6 ft 0 in (1.83 m)
- Positions: Midfielder; striker

Team information
- Current team: Scunthorpe United (assistant manager)

Senior career*
Years	Team	Apps	(Gls)
1978–1985	Huddersfield Town	206	(56)
1985–1986	Manchester City	39	(11)
1986–1987	Derby County	15	(1)
1987–1989	Aston Villa	31	(4)
1989–1991	Scunthorpe United	68	(24)
1991–1992	Stockport County	11	(2)
1992–1993	Witton Albion	20	(10)
1993–1995	Macclesfield Town	37	(2)
Total		427	(110)

Managerial career
- 1997: Scunthorpe United (caretaker)
- 1999–2000: Halifax Town
- 2003: Derby County (caretaker)
- 2004: Stockport County (caretaker)
- 2012: Huddersfield Town (caretaker)
- 2013: Huddersfield Town (caretaker)
- 2014: Huddersfield Town (caretaker)
- 2015: Huddersfield Town (caretaker)
- 2017–2018: Chennaiyin(assistant coach)
- 2020–: Scunthorpe United (assistant manager)
- * Club domestic league appearances and goals

Mark Anthony Lillis (born 17 January 1960) is an English former professional football player and manager. He is assistant manager of National League club Scunthorpe United.

== Playing career ==
Lillis was born in Manchester. He started his professional career at Huddersfield Town in Summer 1978. He played for Huddersfield for seven seasons before being sold in 1985 to Manchester City for £130,000. He stayed at this club for just one season, in which he finished Manchester city's top scorer with 12 goals and in August 1986 was sold to Derby County for £200,000. Because of knee problems, he did not play very often for Derby, and in September 1987 he went to Aston Villa. After that he played for Stockport County and Scunthorpe United before his playing career finished at Macclesfield Town in the mid 90s.

== Managerial and coaching career ==
Lillis took his first job as coach for Macclesfield Town. Later, he worked for Huddersfield Town before he became assistant manager of Scunthorpe United in 1996. His first job as manager came in 1999, when he took the job at Halifax Town, a job he had until September 2000. In 2002, after John Gregory had employed him as a coach at Derby County, and Gregory was suspended from the job, Lillis was for a short time in March 2003 caretaker manager of Derby.

In March 2003 he also became assistant manager to Sammy McIlroy who was manager of Northern Ireland, and held the part-time job until October 2003. After that he became assistant manager to Sammy McIlroy at Stockport County, and when McIlroy quit the job in November 2004, Lillis became caretaker manager of the club until the 18 December 2004 when Chris Turner took over as the new manager.

On 30 May 2006, Lillis once again took over as assistant manager to Sammy McIlroy at Morecambe. Both Lillis and McIlroy left the club by mutual consent on 9 May 2011, after a disappointing twentieth-place finish in Football League Two.

In December 2011, he returned to his first club, Huddersfield Town, to become their new Academy Manager. Two months later he was appointed caretaker manager after the sacking of Lee Clark. He remained in this role until the appointment of Simon Grayson as the new manager, but was never needed as Town had no matches in the intermittent period.

Following Grayson's sacking on 24 January 2013, he became caretaker manager again, this time taking charge of 5 matches, beginning and ending with Town's FA Cup 4th round tie against Leicester City. His 5 games in charge saw Town draw with Leicester in the cup, get a 1–0 win over Crystal Palace, before losing 3–0 to Lillis' former club, Derby County, then holding the runaway leaders Cardiff City to a goalless draw, then getting a 2–1 win against Leicester in the cup replay at the King Power Stadium, setting up a 5th round tie with Premier League side Wigan Athletic.

Following the departure of Mark Robins after a 4–0 defeat by AFC Bournemouth, Lillis was once again made caretaker manager on 11 August 2014.

Following the sacking of Chris Powell on 4 November 2015 he had his fourth stint as the caretaker manager, this though would only consist of the Yorkshire derby against Leeds United which they lost 3–0.

As of August 2017 he is the assistant manager to John Gregory at Indian Super League side Chennaiyin FC.

On 17 August 2020, Lillis rejoined Scunthorpe United, returning as assistant manager to Neil Cox.

== Personal life ==
His son, Josh Lillis, plays for Barrow as a goalkeeper.

== Career statistics ==
Club	Club Type	Club Games	League Games	Club Goals	League Goals	Period
Huddersfield Town	Professional	234	?	63	?	07/1978 – 06/1985
Manchester City	Professional	51	39	15	11	06/1985 – 08/1986
Derby County	Contract	19	15	1	1	08/1986 – 09/1987
Aston Villa	Professional	?	?	?	?	09/1987 – 09/1989
Scunthorpe United	Professional	?	?	?	?	09/1989 – 09/1991
Stockport County	Professional	8	8	0	0	09/1991 – 08/1992
Witton Albion	Semi-Professional	8	8	0	0	08/1992 – ?
Macclesfield Town	Semi-Professional	61	37	1	1	1993–1995

== Managerial statistics ==
Team	From	To	Record				
Team	From	To	G	W	D	L	%
Halifax Town	1 June 1999	12 September 2000	60	16	14	30	26.67
Derby County (caretaker)	21 March 2003	31 March 2003	1	0	0	1	0.00
Stockport County (caretaker)	31 July 1995	1 July 1999	6	1	1	4	16.67
Huddersfield Town (caretaker)	15 February 2012	20 February 2012	0	0	0	0	—
Huddersfield Town (caretaker)	24 January 2013	14 February 2013	5	2	2	1	40.00
Huddersfield Town (caretaker)	11 August 2014	3 September 2014	6	2	1	3	33.33
Huddersfield Town (caretaker)	4 November 2015	8 November 2015	1	0	0	1	0.00
Total			79	21	18	40	26.58

== Honours ==
Manchester City

- Full Members' Cup runner-up: 1985–86

== Sources ==
- Mortimer, Gerald (2004): The Who's Who of DERBY COUNTY.
  Breedon Books Publishing, Derby. ISBN 1-85983-409-4
