= David Burke (English footballer) =

English footballer

Personal information
- Full name: David Ian Burke
- Date of birth: 6 August 1960 (age 66)
- Place of birth: Liverpool, England
- Height: 5 ft 10 in (1.78 m)
- Position: Defender

Senior career*
Years	Team	Apps	(Gls)
1977–1981	Bolton Wanderers	69	(1)
1981–1987	Huddersfield Town	189	(3)
1987–1990	Crystal Palace	81	(0)
1990–1994	Bolton Wanderers	106	(0)
1994–1996	Blackpool	23	(0)
Total		468	(4)
- * Club domestic league appearances and goals

David Ian Burke (born 6 August 1960) is an English former professional footballer. He played as a left-back.

Burke began his career at Bolton Wanderers in 1977, making his league debut as an 18-year-old on 2 September 1978, in a 2–2 draw at Birmingham. He remained at Burnden Park for four years, making 69 league appearances and scoring one goal.

In 1981, he moved across the Pennines to join Huddersfield Town. He went on to make almost 200 appearances for the West Yorkshire club.

He signed for Steve Coppell's Crystal Palace in 1987. He won promotion via the play-offs to the top flight with Palace in 1988–89 but did not make the squad for the 1990 FA Cup Final, which Palace lost to Manchester United after a replay.

Burke returned to his first club, Bolton, later in 1990 and made over 100 further appearances for the club, including winning promotion to Division One (formerly the Second Division) in 1993.

In 1994, he joined Blackpool, who had just appointed Sam Allardyce as their manager. Allardyce was a former teammate of Burke's in his first spell at Bolton in the late 1970s.

After two years with the Seasiders, Burke retired as a player.

== Honours ==
Crystal Palace

- Football League Second Division play-offs: 1989
