= Brian Stanton (footballer) =

English footballer

Personal information
- Full name: Brian Stanton
- Date of birth: 7 February 1956 (age 70)
- Place of birth: Liverpool, England
- Height: 5 ft 7 in (1.70 m)
- Position: Midfielder

Senior career*
Years	Team	Apps	(Gls)
1976–1979	Bury	83	(14)
1979–1986	Huddersfield Town	209	(45)
1986	→ Wrexham (loan)	8	(0)
1986–1988	Rochdale	49	(4)
- * Club domestic league appearances and goals

Brian Stanton (born 7 February 1956) is an English former professional footballer who played in the Football League for Bury, Huddersfield Town, Wrexham and Rochdale.

Before becoming professional he was an amateur footballer in the local Liverpool leagues and also played a number of games for New Brighton. In November 1975 he joined Bury on amateur forms, for whom he later signed professional forms in March 1976 at the age of 20, following the conclusion of his engineering apprenticeship. An energetic and hardworking midfielder for Bury, Huddersfield Town (Wrexham on loan for one month in 85/86 season) and Rochdale. He also had a short period at the then non-league Morecambe before going back to the professional ranks for a couple of seasons with Rochdale until 1988 when he was released by manager Eddie Gray. Having left Rochdale he later had a couple of seasons with Colne Dynamoes.

According to the Huddersfield Daily Examiner, although not confirmed, he is widely believed to hold the record for the fastest hat-trick (6mins) for a player that isn't a striker [three of four goals] in the game against local rivals Bradford City in a 6–3 win on 1 January 1983.

== Honours ==
Huddersfield Town

- Football League Fourth Division: 1979–80
