= Mick Buxton =

English footballer and manager

Michael Buxton
Personal information
- Full name: Michael James Buxton
- Date of birth: 29 May 1943 (age 83)
- Place of birth: Corbridge, England
- Position: Defender

Senior career*
| Years | Team | Apps | (Gls) |
| 1962–1967 | Burnley | 18 | (0) |
| 1968–1971 | Halifax Town (Player Trainer) | 35 | (0) |

Managerial career
- 1978: Huddersfield Town (caretaker)
- 1978–1986: Huddersfield Town
- 1987–1991: Scunthorpe United
- 1993–1995: Sunderland
- * Club domestic league appearances and goals

Michael James Buxton (born 29 May 1943, Corbridge) is a former footballer and football manager in England.

He has managed Huddersfield Town, Scunthorpe United and Sunderland.

== Playing career ==
During his playing career, Buxton played in the Football League for both Burnley and Halifax Town, making a total of 53 professional appearances in nine seasons.

He was plagued with injuries and broke his tibia twice while playing for Halifax.

== Coaching career ==
Buxton became Trainer at Halifax Town whilst still playing and coached at Watford, Barnsley, Mansfield Town and Southend United.

== Managerial career ==
=== Huddersfield Town ===
Buxton initially joined Huddersfield Town in late 1977 from Southend United as the Physiotherapist under manager Tom Johnston. After Johnston's resignation in 1978 Buxton was appointed caretaker manager of Huddersfield Town. He quickly got the job permanently and set about revitalising the Fourth Division club. He installed John Haselden, who was already at the club, as his Assistant Manager and he would also take on the Physio duties. Buxton's first season was the 1978–79 season where Huddersfield finished 9th in the Fourth Division. It was the season after which would prove to be the catalyst for the most successful period of Town's history in the past 10 years. He offloaded the deadwood and brought in players such as Brian Stanton, Mick Laverick and Steve Kindon. He would eventually go on to be one of the most successful managers in the club's recent history, winning promotion to the Third Division at the end of the 1979–80 season where the team scored 101 goals in the league. This team is still loved by the club to this day and have held reunions in 2000, 2010, 2016 and 2017 where the majority of the team and coaching staff still attend. Buxton then took Huddersfield up to the Second Division in 1983. The Terriers would remain in the second tier for five seasons, but Buxton was sacked on 23 December 1986, to be replaced by Steve Smith. Mick Buxton later returned to Town in March 1993 as coach under Ian Ross, and helped the Terriers on one of their best runs in recent history where they only lost once in last eighteen games to avoid relegation. Buxton resigned at the end of the season and Ian Ross soon followed suit.

=== Scunthorpe United ===
Scunthorpe United would be Buxton's next managerial appointment. He remained there for four years, with the team occasionally mounting a promotion challenge in this period. He left by mutual consent on 31 January 1991. He returned to Scunthorpe in 1996, but left the following year.

=== Sunderland ===
Following the dismissal of Terry Butcher with the side in the relegation zone, Buxton would be appointed Sunderland manager in 1993. A tightening of the team's defence led to an improvement in results and Sunderland finished the 1993-94 season in 12th place. Although a reasonable defensive record was maintained the following season, Sunderland were entangled in a relegation struggle and Buxton would be replaced by Peter Reid.

== Honours ==
=== Manager ===
Huddersfield Town

- Football League Fourth Division: 1979–80
- Football League Third Division third-place promotion: 1982–83
