= Huddersfield Town A.F.C. =

Association football club in Huddersfield, England

Huddersfield Town
- Full name: Huddersfield Town Association Football Club
- Nickname: The Terriers
- Founded: 15 August 1908; 118 years ago
- Ground: Accu Stadium
- Capacity: 24,121
- Owner: Kevin M. Nagle
- Chairman: Kevin M. Nagle
- Head coach: Martin Drury
- League: EFL League One
- 2025–26: EFL League One, 9th of 24
- Website: htafc.com
Home colours	Away colours	Third colours

Huddersfield Town Association Football Club is a professional association football club based in Huddersfield, West Yorkshire, England. The club competes in EFL League One, the third tier of English football.

Huddersfield Town were founded on 15 August 1908. They competed in the North Eastern League and Midland League, before gaining admittance to the Football League in 1910. They were promoted out of the Second Division in 1919–20 and went on to win the FA Cup in 1922, having been beaten finalists in 1920. Huddersfield were crowned league champions in three successive seasons: 1923–24, 1924–25 and 1925–26, the first two under the management of Herbert Chapman, the hat-trick completed under Cecil Potter. They also finished 2nd in the following two seasons. They played on the losing side in three more FA Cup finals: 1928, 1930 and 1938. They were relegated from the First Division after 32 years in 1952, though secured an immediate promotion the following season. Relegated again in 1956, they won the Second Division title at the end of the 1969–70 season, though were relegated three times in four years by 1975.

Huddersfield won the Fourth Division in 1979–80 and were promoted from the Third Division in 1982–83. Relegated in 1988, they were beaten in the 1994 final of the Football League Trophy, though returned to Wembley the following year to win the third tier's play-off final. They returned to the fourth tier in 2003 following a second relegation in three years. Huddersfield reached the Premier League with three successful play-off campaigns: from Division Three in 2004, from League One in 2012, and then from the Championship in 2017. They spent two seasons in the Premier League before being relegated in 2019. They were relegated from the Championship in 2024.

The team have played home games at the Kirklees Stadium (currently known as the Accu Stadium due to sponsorship) since moving from Leeds Road in 1994. The club colours of blue and white stripes were adopted in 1913. Their nickname, "The Terriers", was taken in 1969. Huddersfield's current emblem is based on the town's coat of arms. The team have long-standing West Yorkshire derby rivalries with Bradford City and Leeds United.

== History ==
Chart showing the progress of Huddersfield Town A.F.C. through the English football league system.

=== Early years and golden days (1908–1945) ===
The club was founded in 1908. The founders bought a site on Leeds Road for £500, and joined the North Eastern League. The following season they joined the Midland Football League in order to reduce travelling costs. In an effort to gain entry into the Football League, the club invited Scottish architect Archibald Leitch to reconstruct Leeds Road. A 4,000-seat stand was to be constructed, and terracing was also planned, to provide an overall capacity of 34,000. After the plans went through, Huddersfield directors successfully applied to become members of the Football League in 1910, and development of Leeds Road began immediately. However, the development costs were too high, and attendances sunk below 7,000. Huddersfield went into liquidation in 1912, after which a new limited company was formed to take over the club's assets.

Huddersfield Town were reportedly £25,000 in debt in 1919, and attendances fell to around 3,000. Chairman John Hilton Crowther planned to merge Town with newly formed Leeds United and to relocate to Leeds. The reports galvanised supporters to start fundraising to stave off the move. Shares of £1 had been released, converting the club to a public ownership. After a month of acquiring funds and negotiations, the club stayed in Huddersfield. The team then reached the 1920 FA Cup final and won promotion to First Division for the first time.

During their first season in the top flight, former Leeds City manager Herbert Chapman was brought in (after Huddersfield helped him overturn his ban) as the new assistant to Ambrose Langley. Chapman replaced Langley in March 1921, and led the team to a 17th-place finish. In the off-season of 1921, playmaker Clem Stephenson and George Brown were acquired; Brown would later become Huddersfield's all-time top goal scorer. Chapman's tactics were based upon the principles of a strong defence and a fast, counter-attacking response, with the focus on quick, short passing and mazy runs from his wingers. He is regarded as the first manager to successfully employ the counter-attack. Other progressive ideas included a disciplined fitness regime for the players, and the practice of reserve and youth teams playing the same style as the senior team. He employed a wide-ranging scouting network to find the right players for his tactical system.

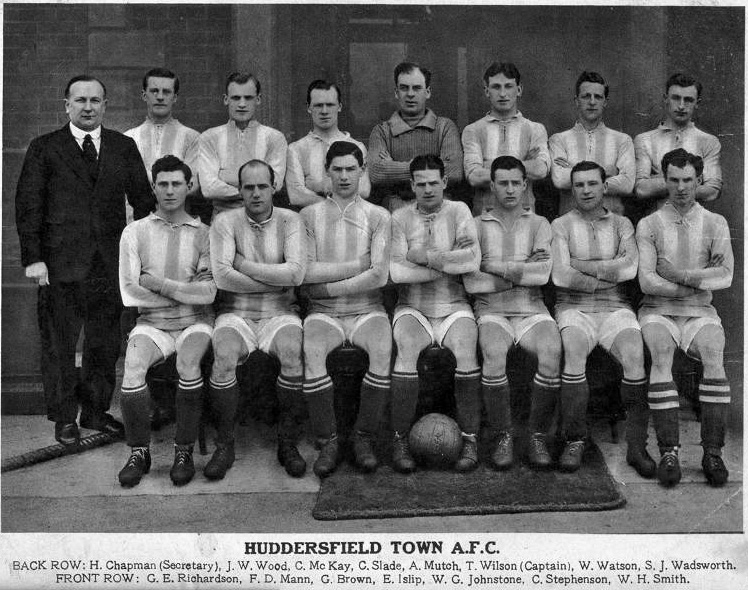
The team that won the 1922 FA Cup

The team won their first major honour, the FA Cup, after Preston North End were beaten 1–0 in the 1922 FA Cup final. Huddersfield also won the 1922 Charity Shield, defeating Liverpool 1–0. Town finished in third place in 1922–23, before winning their first-ever First Division championship in 1923–24. The team fought off Cardiff City, although it was by the narrowest of margins. They both finished on 57 points, but Huddersfield won it by a difference of 0.024 on goal average. Huddersfield defeated Nottingham Forest 3–0 in the final match, while Cardiff only drew at Birmingham City, also missing a penalty.

The team retained their First Division title in 1924–25 after losing only once in the final 27 league matches. Huddersfield only conceded 28 goals and never conceded more than two per game; the first time a team accomplished this feat. Another notable feat was achieved in October 1924, when Billy Smith became the first player in English football history to score directly from a corner. After winning successive league titles, Chapman left for Arsenal, which offered double his wages. Cecil Potter was brought in as his successor. Under Potter, Town became the first club to win three successive English League titles in 1925–26. The team came close to winning a fourth consecutive title the following season, but won only one of the last seven matches and thus lost the title to Newcastle United. Town won the "wrong double" in the 1927–28 season; they finished runners-up in both the league and the FA Cup.

In March 1928, an international match between England and Scotland featured five Town players. Tom Wilson, Bob Kelly, Billy Smith and Roy Goodall started for England, while Alex Jackson played for Scotland. Jackson scored a hat-trick as Scotland, later nicknamed "The Wembley Wizards", defeated England 5–1.

Huddersfield's ageing squad was not adequately replaced. A deterioration of their league position followed, although they finished runners-up in 1933–34, and reached two more FA Cup finals under manager Clem Stephenson. Town were defeated in the 1930 FA Cup final by Chapman's Arsenal, and in 1938 by Preston North End after extra time, which was the first FA Cup final to be broadcast in full on television. A record home attendance of 67,037 was achieved in 1932 during an FA Cup sixth round tie against Arsenal.

=== Decline and recovery (1945–1992) ===
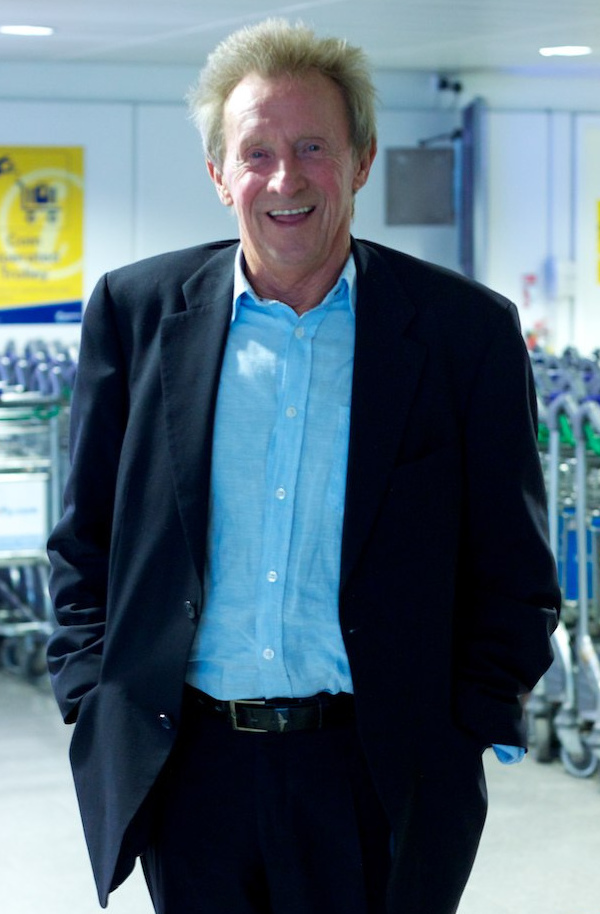
Denis Law started his career at Huddersfield

Town were relegated for the first time in the 1951–52 season. Stockport County manager Andy Beattie was appointed in April 1952, and managed Stockport and Huddersfield in three divisions in the same month. He also had two horseshoes nailed to his office wall for luck. The team finished second in the Second Division in 1952–53 and made an immediate return. They finished in third place in their first season back in the top flight. After Town were relegated in 1955–56, Beattie resigned as manager in November 1956, and Bill Shankly succeeded him. In December 1957, the team led 5–1 with 30 minutes remaining against Charlton Athletic, but lost 7–6. Shankly left in December 1959 to manage Liverpool.

Floodlights were installed at Leeds Road in 1961, which were financed by the British record transfer fee of £55,000 of Denis Law to Manchester City, and became known as the "Denis Law Lights".

Huddersfield continued to play in the second tier during the 1960s. They reached the semi-final of the League Cup in 1967–68, but lost on aggregate to Arsenal. In 1969, the club adopted the nickname "The Terriers". Town won the Second Division in 1969–70 under the guidance of Ian Greaves. The team stayed up in their first season back in the first tier, but were relegated in 1971–72, which was followed by another relegation to the Third Division for the first time the season after. Huddersfield were relegated to the Fourth Division for the first time in 1974–75. The 1974–75 season also saw Huddersfield Town field a black player for the first time with Lloyd Maitland making his first team debut on 8 February 1974 against Hereford United. Former Town manager Tom Johnston returned to the club as general manager in 1975. The club later returned to all-blue shirts that he had introduced in the mid-1960s. Johnston replaced Bobby Collins as manager in December 1975. During the 1976–77 season, John Haselden became the manager with Johnston returning to his previous role. This, however, did not last, as Johnston demoted Haselden in September 1977 and gave himself the job. He managed Town to their lowest ever league position of 11th at the end of the 1977–78 season.

A recovery started under manager Mick Buxton, who was appointed in 1978. Huddersfield won the Fourth Division in 1979–80, scoring 101 goals in the process. Town finished just outside the promotion places the following season. The team won promotion to the Second Division in 1982–83 by a third-place finish. Due to Huddersfield languishing at the bottom of the division, declining home attendances, and the resulting financial pressure, Buxton was sacked in December 1986. Steve Smith succeeded him, and became the only permanent manager in the club's history to hail from Huddersfield. The team stayed up by three points that season, but were relegated back to the third tier in 1987–88. Town only won six matches, conceded 100 goals, and lost 10–1 against Manchester City. Huddersfield reached the 1991–92 Third Division play-offs, but lost the semi-final against Peterborough United by an aggregate score of 4–3.

=== New stadium, near extinction, and a return to the top flight (1992–2019) ===
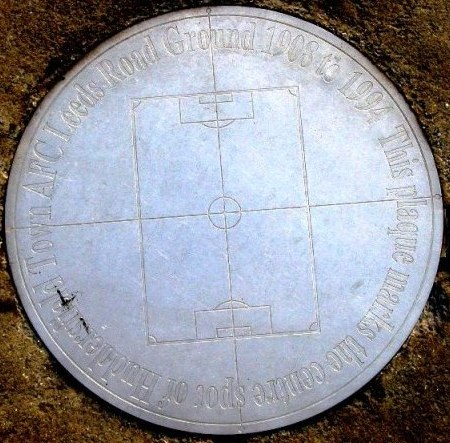
Former Leeds Road centre spot

The team avoided relegation to the Third Division (renamed from the Fourth Division after the introduction of the Premier League) in 1992–93, following a run of only three defeats in their last 17 league games, to finish in 15th place. Manager Neil Warnock took over from Ian Ross for the 1993–94 season. Town reached the 1994 Football League Trophy final, but lost against Swansea City on penalties.

Huddersfield Town played their final match at Leeds Road on 30 April 1994, beating Blackpool 2–1, which was watched by a near capacity crowd of 16,195. They moved into the new Kirklees Stadium (then named as the Alfred McAlpine Stadium) for the 1994–95 season. During the first season at the new stadium, Huddersfield were promoted to the second tier via the play-offs after a 2–1 win against Bristol Rovers at Wembley. Warnock left the club that summer, and was replaced by Brian Horton, who guided the Town to an eighth-place finish the following season.

Horton was sacked in October 1997, with Huddersfield without a win in their first nine games. Former Huddersfield player Peter Jackson was given the job. They only scored one point in Jackson's first five games, but Huddersfield finally won in their 15th match, by beating Stoke City 3–1. Unbeaten runs mixed with winless runs followed, and Town managed to stay up by a 16th-place finish.

In January 1999, the club was bought by local businessman Barry Rubery, who targeted to reach the Premier League. Steve Bruce succeeded Jackson in May 1999. Huddersfield topped the table in December, but their form plummeted after striker Marcus Stewart was sold in the January transfer window to First Division rivals Ipswich Town. They finished the season in eighth place, just outside the play-offs. Bruce was sacked in October 2000. Rubery accused Bruce of "wasting £3 million", arguing that the money would have been "spent more wisely by a more experienced manager without an ego to feed". He was replaced by Lou Macari, who was unable to halt the slide as relegation to the third tier followed at the end of the season. Huddersfield reached the play-offs in 2001–02, but lost 2–1 to Brentford in the semi-final.

Around this time, the club had debts of 20 million pounds following relegation and the collapse of ITV Digital. The players went months without being paid, and manager Mick Wadsworth was sacked in January 2003, only to be reinstated because the club did not have any money for his pay-off. Wadsworth was eventually sacked in March and replaced by Mel Machin, who oversaw relegation to the fourth tier. The club was put into administration, but Ken Davy bought the club in the summer of 2003 and rescued Town from liquidation. Manager Peter Jackson only had four senior players on the books before the beginning of the 2003–04 season, after which many youngsters from the academy setup were added. Huddersfield finished in a surprising fourth place, and defeated Mansfield Town in the play-off final to return to the third tier.

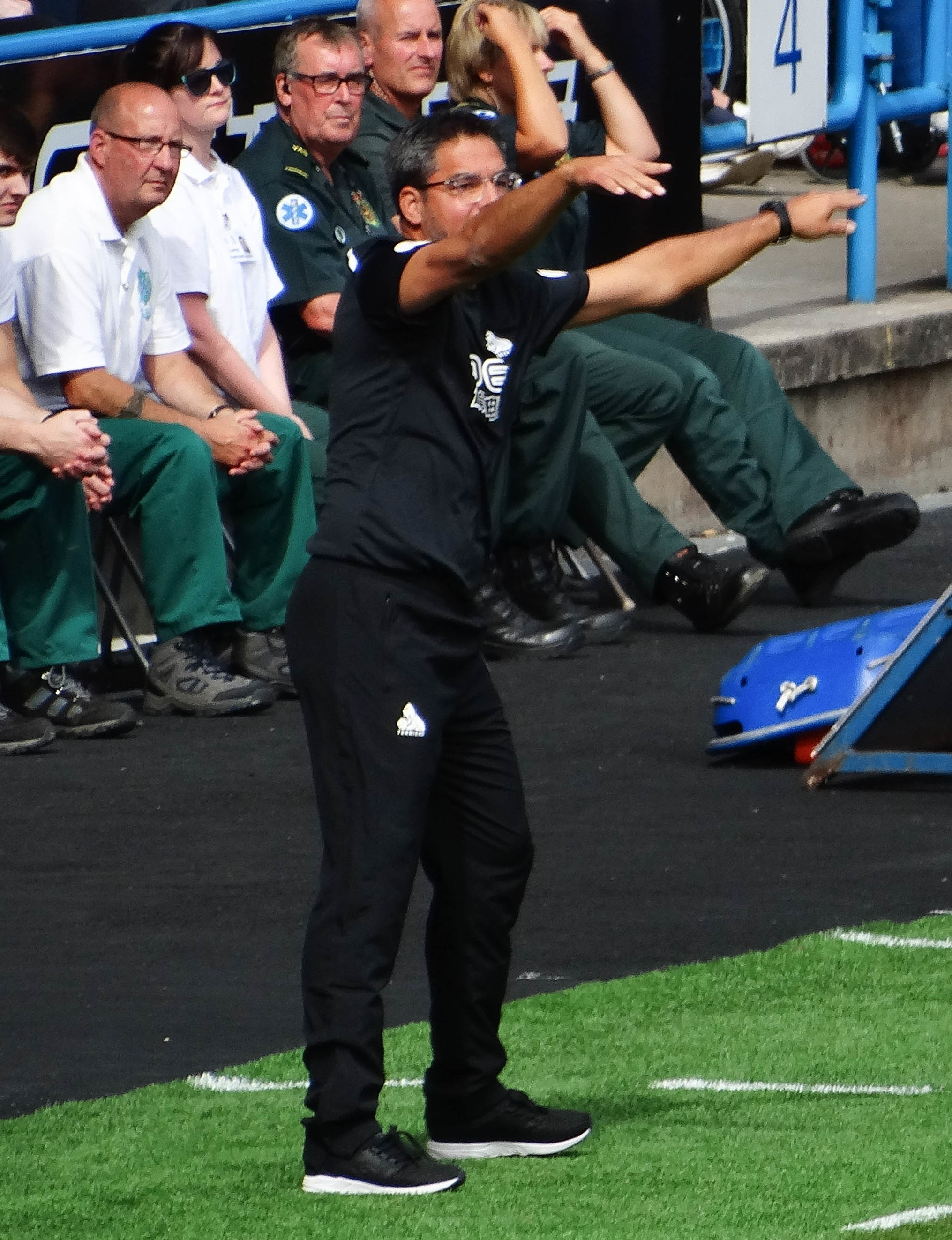
Manager David Wagner guided Huddersfield to the Premier League in 2016–17

The team reached the play-offs in 2005–06, but were eliminated by Barnsley in the semi-final, after further seasons in League One followed. Dean Hoyle took over as chairman, and majority shareholder, of the club in June 2009. Town reached the play-offs in 2009–10 under manager Lee Clark, but lost against Millwall in the semi-final. The team again qualified for the play-offs the following season, however, Peterborough United were victorious in the final. Huddersfield set a Football League record of 43 matches unbeaten (not including the play-off matches), which was previously set by Nottingham Forest, in November 2011. Clark was sacked in February 2012 following a 1–0 home defeat to Sheffield United, and was replaced by former Leeds United manager Simon Grayson. He led Town to the play-off final against Sheffield United. The game finished 0–0 after extra time, before Huddersfield were victorious after 22 penalties (8–7).

Despite this success, Grayson was sacked in January 2013, being succeeded by Mark Robins. Huddersfield avoided relegation on the last day, after a draw with Barnsley. German Borussia Dortmund II coach David Wagner became the first person born outside the British Isles to manage the club in November 2015. He implemented the "Gegenpressing" style of play. In 2016–17, Town finished fifth with a negative goal difference, and qualified for the play-offs. After defeating Sheffield Wednesday on penalties in the semi-final, they faced Reading in the final. Another penalty shoot-out followed, and Huddersfield were again victorious. Promotion to the Premier League meant a return to the first tier for the first time since 1972. Huddersfield also became the second club, after Blackpool, to have won all three divisional play-offs.

The team finished 16th in the Premier League in the 2017–18 season and stayed up, but were relegated after a 20th-place finish in 2018–19. Wagner left the club by mutual consent in January 2019, and was replaced by Borussia Dortmund II manager Jan Siewert, but Town were relegated in March with six matches remaining. The team logged only three wins and 16 points by the end of the season.

=== Championship years and two new owners (2019–present) ===
Chairman Hoyle announced his departure in May 2019, selling the club to businessman Phil Hodgkinson, relinquishing the post due to poor health. Siewert was replaced by Lincoln City manager Danny Cowley in September of that year, who guided the club to survival in the Championship before being sacked. Leeds United assistant coach Carlos Corberán was appointed as the club's new head coach in July 2020.

Huddersfield finished third in the EFL Championship and met fourth placed Nottingham Forest in the 2022 EFL Championship play-off final at Wembley, losing 1–0; Town were denied two penalty claims by referee Jonathan Moss in his last game before retirement. In the first instance, the video assistant referee did not overturn Moss's decision despite apparent contact between Forest's Jack Colback and Huddersfield's Harry Toffolo.

Corberán left in July 2022, shortly before the 2022–23 Championship season, and joined Olympiacos in Greece. Former Town player Danny Schofield was appointed as the new head coach, but was dismissed 10 weeks later after a poor start to the new season, to be replaced by Hertha BSC assistant coach Mark Fotheringham. He lasted only four months and was sacked on 8 February 2023, being replaced by Neil Warnock five days later. His return to the John Smiths stadium saw a 2–1 win against Birmingham on 18 February 2023 and he was quoted as saying he had 'tears in his eyes' due to the reception he received from the fans.

On 23 March 2023, Huddersfield announced the club's takeover by an unnamed North American group after Dean Hoyle, who returned to the club in 2020, acquired 100% of its shares and then sold them. The deal was subject to "legislative and governance procedures", and involved Hoyle writing off £40 million of debt to keep the club, sitting 22nd in the Championship, out of administration. On 28 March 2023, the club revealed the bid was from El Dorado Hills, California (United States) investor and owner of USL Championship side Sacramento Republic, Kevin M. Nagle; the deal was completed in June 2023.

A 1–0 home victory against already-promoted Sheffield United on 4 May 2023 confirmed Huddersfield's safety. However, Huddersfield continued to struggle in the 2023–24 season, parting company with Warnock in September 2023, then appointing Darren Moore as manager, but sacking him in January 2024, after just three wins in 23 matches, with the club 21st in the second tier and three points above the relegation places. Moore was replaced by Andre Breitenreiter on 15 February 2024. The club ended the season in 23rd place, resulting in relegation to League One. Breitenreiter left the club by mutual consent and was replaced by Michael Duff. Succeeding Duff, Lee Grant became manager for the team in May 2025, and left the team in January 2026.

== Badge and colours ==
The club spent years debating what colour the kit should be, with suggestions ranging from salmon pink to plain white or all-blue to white with blue yoke. Eventually, in 1913, the club adopted the striped blue and white jersey that remains to this day.

The club badge is based on the coat of arms of Huddersfield. Town first used a badge on its shirts for the 1920 FA Cup Final based on the Huddersfield coat of arms. It appeared again with a Yorkshire Rose for the 1922 FA Cup Final and again for the finals of 1928, 1930 and 1938. The club's main colours of blue and white are evident throughout the badge both in the mantling and in the shield, in the form of stripes. Two Yorkshire Roses and Castle Hill form part of the history of the club and the area.

Town stuck with the same principal design (blue and white stripes) until 1966, when Scottish manager Tom Johnston introduced all-blue shirts. A new badge was also adopted that year, when the vertical monogram "HTFC" adorned the all-blue shirts. When the club adopted the nickname "The Terriers" for the 1969–70 season, the blue and white stripes returned and with it a red terrier with the words "The Terriers".

After relegation to the Fourth Division, Huddersfield returned to all-blue shirts and the vertical monogram crest with the return of Tom Johnston in 1975. Stripes returned in the 1977–78 season and have been the club's home kit ever since. In 1980, Town adopted what remains their badge today. It combined elements of the old town coat of arms with modern motifs, such as blue and white stripes and a terrier with a football.

In 2000, Huddersfield changed its badge to a circular design, but that was never popular with the fans, and soon returned to the heraldic-style badge. The badge was further redeveloped with a small adaptation in 2005. The club took the decision to remove "A.F.C." from the text, leaving only the wording "Huddersfield Town". This eased problems with embroidery on shirts and club merchandise, and also gave the printwork a standard look.

The club adopted a Terriers logo in 2018. It was used solely on the strip and did not replace the heraldic crest, which continued to appear on all official media and documents. In 2019, Town agreed to have Paddy Power shirt sponsorship in a striking beauty queen style diagonal sash design. Within days, the club were contacted by The Football Association for their "observations" about the kit. Shortly after, it was revealed that the shirt was a prank envisioned by Paddy Power, and that the club would play in shirts without a sponsor. as part of their "Save Our Shirt" campaign.

Huddersfield returned to an updated version of their heraldic-style crest in 2019. The three stars (representing their hat-trick of league titles in the 1920s) were moved inside the shield. Furthermore, a single Yorkshire Rose was placed at the top of the blue and white stripes, above the three stars. The shield was also modernized by moving away from the more rounded version. The Terrier was incorporated into the crest, at the top of the shield, and the club's founding date was introduced on either side of Castle Hill.

=== Kit suppliers and shirt sponsors ===
Period	Kit manufacturer	Shirt sponsor (chest)	Shirt sponsor (sleeve)
1975–1979	Bukta	None	None
1979–1982	Barralan	None	None
1982–1984	Bukta	Central Mirfield	None
1984–1986	Bukta	Daihatsu	None
1986–1987	Eagle	Greenall's	None
1987–1990	Matchwinner	Greenall's	None
1990–1991	Beaver	Greenall's	None
1991–1993	Gola	Gola	None
1993–1994	Super League	Pulse (home); Vileda (away)	None
1994–1995	Super League	Pulse	None
1995–1997	Super League	Panasonic	None
1997–1999	Pony	Panasonic	None
1999–2001	Mitre	Panasonic	None
2001–2002	Bloggs	Prime Time Recruitment	None
2002–2003	VOI	Prime Time Recruitment	None
2003–2005	Admiral	Prime Time Recruitment	None
2005–2007	Admiral	Yorkshire Building Society	None
2007–2009	Mitre	CasinoRed	None
2009–2010	Mitre	Yorkshire Air Ambulance (home); Radian B (away)	None
2010–2011	Mitre	Kirklees College (home); Radian B (away)	None
2011–2012	Umbro	Kirklees College (home); Radian B (away)	None
2012–2013	Umbro	Rekorderlig (home); Radian B (away)	None
2013–2015	Puma	Rekorderlig (home); Radian B (away); Covonia (third)	None
2015–2017	Puma	PURE Legal Limited (home); Radian B (away); Covonia (third)	None
2017–2018	Puma	OPE Sports	PURE Legal Limited
2018–2019	Umbro	OPE Sports	Leisu Sports
2019–2020	Umbro	Paddy Power (unbranded)	None
2020–2021	Umbro	Various local companies/charities	None
2021–2025	Umbro	Utilita	Jetcoin (FA Cup only)
2025-Present	Castore	Hey Dude	Core

== Stadiums ==
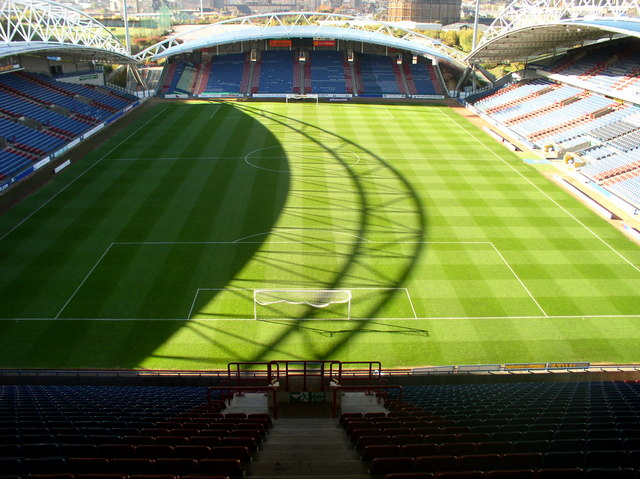
Kirklees Stadium, home of Huddersfield Town since 1994

- Leeds Road (1908–1994)
- Kirklees Stadium (1994–present)
  - Named "Alfred McAlpine Stadium" (1994–2004)
  - Named "Galpharm Stadium" (2004–2012)
  - Named "John Smith's Stadium" (2012–2025)
  - Named "Accu Stadium" (2025–present)

Huddersfield were the first team to have played at each of the four professional levels of English football at two different grounds.

== Supporters and rivalries ==
There's a team that is dear to its followers,
Their colours are bright blue and white,
They're a team of renown, the pride of the town,
And the game of football is their delight.
All the while, upon the field of play,
Thousands loudly cheer them on their way.
Often you can hear them say, who can beat the Town today?
Then the bells will ring so merrily,
Every goal, shall be a memory,
So Town play up, and bring the Cup,
Back to Huddersfield!
We're Yorkshire! We're Yorkshire! We're Yorkshire!

— Lyrics of "Smile A While"

Since 1920, Huddersfield's club song has been "Smile A While". The anthem was created by G. W. Chappell of Longwood, Huddersfield, before the 1920 FA Cup Final against Aston Villa. It was an adapted version of the popular First World War song "Till We Meet Again". Chappell's creation was originally called "The Town Anthem", and was sung by Town supporters ahead of the Final. The anthem is still sung by Huddersfield supporters at home matches.

In 2014, a group of Town fans formed a collective called "North Stand Loyal". Its aim was "to improve the atmosphere around the stadium on matchdays", and the members were "inspired by fan groups of continental Europe and other parts of the world". In 2017, the group renamed themselves "Cowshed Loyal". The group is located in the South Stand, which is shared with away fans.

The club also has various overseas supporters' groups, with clubs in Australia, Canada, Northern Ireland, Norway, Republic of Ireland, Singapore, Slovakia, and United States. Notable fans over the years have included Prime Minister Harold Wilson, who was born in the town, and actor Sir Patrick Stewart, who became president of the Huddersfield Town Academy in 2010. After Stewart's death, his Star Trek: The Next Generation co-star Marina Sirtis, who is a fan of Tottenham Hotspur F.C., recalled that the Huddersfield Town - Tottenham match in 2018 was called the Star Trek derby in the match-day programme.

Huddersfield Town's main rivals are considered to be West Yorkshire clubs Bradford City and Leeds United. Town hold the better head-to-head record against City; 21 matches have been won, 17 drawn, and 14 lost. Including games against United's predecessor team Leeds City, Huddersfield have won 36 of the 90 derbies between the two sides, with 20 draws and 34 Leeds wins.

There are smaller rivalries with South Yorkshire clubs Barnsley and Sheffield Wednesday, and there is a Roses rivalry with Oldham Athletic. Huddersfield also have a rivalry with Cambridgeshire club Peterborough United, largely fuelled by the play-off meetings in 1992 and 2011.

A nascent rivalry now exists with Nottingham Forest on account of Huddersfield's controversial 1-0 defeat in the 2021-22 Championship play-off final, immediately after which Forest poached two of Huddersfield's most prominent players: Lewis O'Brien and Harry Toffolo.

== Players ==
=== First-team squad ===
As of 3 September 2026

Note: Flags indicate national team as defined under FIFA eligibility rules; some limited exceptions apply. Players may hold more than one non-FIFA nationality.

No.	Pos.	Nation	Player
1	GK	ENG	Matty Young (on loan from Sunderland)
2	DF	DEN	Lasse Sørensen
3	DF	SCO	Murray Wallace
4	MF	ENG	Ryan Ledson (captain)
5	DF	WAL	Joe Low
6	DF	ENG	Jack Whatmough
7	DF	USA	Lynden Gooch
8	MF	ENG	Archie Collins
9	FW	WAL	Joe Taylor
10	MF	IRL	Marcus Harness
11	FW	ENG	Ashley Fletcher
12	DF	SUR	Radinio Balker
14	MF	ENG	Ethan Brierley
15	DF	SCO	Ibane Bowat

No.	Pos.	Nation	Player
16	MF	ENG	Herbie Kane
17	MF	ENG	Marcus McGuane
18	MF	NGR	David Kasumu
19	MF	ENG	Bali Mumba
20	MF	ENG	Cameron Humphreys (on loan from Ipswich Town)
22	DF	NED	Ilias Bronkhorst
23	DF	IRL	Sean Roughan
24	MF	ENG	Cameron Ashia
25	FW	SRB	Bojan Radulović
26	FW	ENG	George Sebine
30	FW	CPV	Derensili Sanches Fernandes
31	GK	ENG	Jak Alnwick
33	GK	NZL	Nik Tzanev
34	FW	ENG	Samson Tovide

=== Out on loan ===
Note: Flags indicate national team as defined under FIFA eligibility rules; some limited exceptions apply. Players may hold more than one non-FIFA nationality.

No.	Pos.	Nation	Player
21	MF	ENG	Antony Evans (at Walsall until 30 June 2027)
—	FW	NIR	Dion Charles (at Blackpool until 30 June 2027)

No.	Pos.	Nation	Player
—	FW	ENG	Alfie May (at Doncaster Rovers until 30 June 2027)

=== Huddersfield Town U21 ===
As of 6 October 2026

Note: Flags indicate national team as defined under FIFA eligibility rules; some limited exceptions apply. Players may hold more than one non-FIFA nationality.

No.	Pos.	Nation	Player
27	MF	IRL	Jay Sway
28	MF	ENG	Daniel Vost
29	DF	ENG	Max Murray
36	DF	USA	Ian Togo
37	DF	WAL	Marlie Neil
38	FW	ENG	Jamie Spencer
39	DF	ZIM	Dylan Tawodzera

No.	Pos.	Nation	Player
41	MF	GIB	Luke Schofield
—	GK	NIR	Francis Hurl
—	DF	NGR	Nic Idemudia
—	DF	ENG	George Iorpenda
—	MF	ENG	Jonathan Hogg (player-coach)
—	FW	ENG	Zac Bowker
—	FW	ENG	Jahkyah Ebanks-Blake

== Notable former players ==
=== English Football Hall of Fame members ===
Several ex-players/managers associated with Huddersfield Town are represented in the English Football Hall of Fame, which was created in 2002, as a celebration of those who have made an outstanding contribution to the game. To be considered for induction players/managers must be 30 years of age or older and have played/managed for at least five years in England.

- (England) Herbert Chapman
- (Northern Ireland) Peter Doherty
- (Scotland) Denis Law
- (Scotland) Bill Shankly
- (England) Clem Stephenson
- (England) Ray Wilson

=== Football League 100 Legends ===
The Football League 100 Legends is a list of "100 legendary football players" produced by the Football League in 1998, to celebrate the 100th season of league football. Three former Huddersfield players made the list.

- (England) Clem Stephenson
- (Northern Ireland) Peter Doherty
- (Scotland) Denis Law

=== Player of the Year (Hargreaves Memorial Trophy) ===
As voted for by members of the official Huddersfield Town Supporters Club.

Year	Winner
1975	(England) Terry Dolan
1976	(England) Terry Gray
1977	(England) Kevin Johnson
1978	(England) Mick Butler
1979	(England) Alan Starling
1980	(England) Malcolm Brown
1981	(England) Mark Lillis
1982	(England) Mick Kennedy
1983	(England) David Burke
1984	(England) Paul Jones
1985	(England) David Burke
1986	(Wales) Joey Jones
1987	(Scotland) Duncan Shearer
1988	(England) Simon Trevitt
1989	(England) Steve Hardwick
1990	(England) Lee Martin
1991	(England) Graham Mitchell
1992	(Wales) Iwan Roberts

Year	Winner
1993	(England) Neil Parsley
1994	(England) Steve Francis
1995	(England) Ronnie Jepson
1996	(Scotland) Tom Cowan
1997	(Scotland) Tom Cowan
1998	(England) Jon Dyson
1999	(Belgium) Nico Vaesen
2000	(England) Jamie Vincent
2001	(England) Craig Armstrong
2002	(England) Leon Knight
2003	(England) Martin Smith
2004	(England) Jon Worthington
2005	(England) Nathan Clarke
2006	(England) Andy Booth
2007	(England) David Mirfin
2008	(England) Andy Holdsworth
2009	(England) Gary Roberts
2010	(England) Peter Clarke

Year	Winner
2011	(England) Peter Clarke
2012	(Scotland) Jordan Rhodes
2013	(England) James Vaughan
2014	(England) Adam Clayton
2015	(England) Jacob Butterfield
2016	(Bermuda) Nahki Wells
2017	(Australia) Aaron Mooy
2018	(Germany) Christopher Schindler
2019	(Germany) Christopher Schindler
2020	(England) Lewis O'Brien
2021	(England) Jonathan Hogg
2022	(England) Lee Nicholls
2023	(Poland) Michal Helik
2024	(Poland) Michal Helik
2025	(Northern Ireland) Callum Marshall
2026	(Scotland) Murray Wallace

== Club management ==
=== Club officials ===
Position	Name
Chairman	Kevin Nagle
Director	Michael Thomas
Chief Executive	Jake Edwards
Chief Operating Officer	David Threfall-Sykes

=== First team technical staff ===
Position	Name
Head Coach	Martin Drury
Assistant Head Coach	Jon Stead
Goalkeeping Coach	Chris Elliott
Head of Analysis & Innovation	James Beck
Lead First Team Analyst	Mackenzie Longley
First Team Analyst	Lewis Dunwoody
Goalkeeping Performance Analyst	Adam O'Rourke
Senior Physiotherapists	Liam Kershaw; Craig Sedgwick; Vikki Stevens
Sports Therapists	Matty Greenlees; Matthew Potts
Head of Strength & IDP	Callum Adams
Senior Physical Performance Coach	Dan Hughes
Physical Performance Coach	Jordan Foster
Head of academy	Jon Worthington

== Honours ==
In 1926, Huddersfield Town became the first English team to win the First Division title in three consecutive seasons, a feat not surpassed until 2024 by Manchester City, although it has been equalled by Arsenal, Liverpool, Manchester City and twice by Manchester United.

Huddersfield Town were the second team, after Blackpool, to have won all three divisional play-offs, when they won the 2017 Championship play-off.

The club's honours include the following:

League

- First Division (level 1) (Note: Upon its formation in 1992, the Premier League became the top tier of English football; the Football League First and Second Divisions then became the second and third tiers, respectively. From 2004, the First Division became the Championship and the Second Division became League One.)
  - Champions: 1923–24, 1924–25, 1925–26
  - Runners-up: 1926–27, 1927–28, 1933–34
- Second Division / Championship (level 2)
  - Champions: 1969–70
  - 2nd place promotion: 1919–20, 1952–53
  - Play-off winners: 2017
- Third Division / Second Division / League One (level 3)
  - 3rd place promotion: 1982–83
  - Play-off winners: 1995, 2012
- Fourth Division / Third Division (level 4)
  - Champions: 1979–80
  - Play-off winners: 2004

Cup

- FA Cup
  - Winners: 1921–22
  - Runners-up: 1919–20, 1927–28, 1929–30, 1937–38
- FA Charity Shield
  - Winners: 1922
- Football League Trophy
  - Runners-up: 1993–94

== Sources ==
=== Bibliography ===
- Binns, George S. (1984). Huddersfield Town: 75 Years On. Huddersfield Town AFC. ASIN B00186U9VU.
- Brown, Jim (2003). Huddersfield Town: Champions of England 1923–26. Desert Island Books Limited. ISBN 978-1874287667.
- Frost, Terry (1990). Huddersfield Town: A Complete Record 1910-1990. Breedon Books Publishing Company Ltd. ISBN 978-0907969648.
