= 1987 Football League Fourth Division play-off final =

Association football match

- Event: 1986–87 Football League Fourth Division
Aldershot	Wolverhampton Wanderers
3	0
- on aggregate

First leg
Aldershot	Wolverhampton Wanderers
2	0
- Date: 22 May 1987
- Venue: Recreation Ground, Aldershot
- Referee: Allan Gunn
- Attendance: 5,069

Second leg
Wolverhampton Wanderers	Aldershot
0	1
- Date: 25 May 1987
- Venue: Molineux, Wolverhampton
- Referee: Keith Hackett
- Attendance: 19,962

The 1987 Football League Fourth Division play-off final was an association football match contested by Aldershot and Wolverhampton Wanderers over two legs on 22 May 1987 and 25 May 1987 to determine which club would play the next season in the Third Division. Aldershot had finished in sixth place in the Fourth Division while Wolverhampton Wanderers were fourth. They were joined in the play-offs by fifth-placed Colchester United and Bolton Wanderers, who had finished in 21st position in the division above. Aldershot defeated Bolton Wanderers in their semi-final, consigning the latter to relegation, while Wolverhampton Wanderers beat Colchester United in the other semi-final.

The first leg of the final was played at Recreation Ground in Aldershot, in front of a crowd of 5,069. An early goal from Ian McDonald and a second-half penalty from Bobby Barnes gave Aldershot a 2–0 lead heading into the second leg. Three days later, at Molineux, 19,962 people saw Barnes score the only goal of the game to give Aldershot a 3–0 aggregate victory and promotion to the Third Division. Crowd violence followed the second leg with more than 40 people being arrested.

Aldershot ended their following season in 20th position in the Third Division, one place and one point above the relegation play-off position. Wolverhampton Wanderers' next season saw them finish as champions of the Fourth Division, gaining automatic promotion to the Third Division for the 1988–89 season.

== Route to the final ==
Football League Third Division final table, relegation positions
Pos	Team	Pld	W	D	L	GF	GA	GD	Pts
21	Bolton Wanderers	46	10	15	21	46	58	−12	45
22	Carlisle United	46	10	8	28	39	78	−39	38
23	Darlington	46	7	16	23	45	77	−32	37
24	Newport County	46	8	13	25	49	86	−37	37

Football League Fourth Division final table, leading positions
Pos	Team	Pld	W	D	L	GF	GA	GD	Pts
1	Northampton Town	46	30	9	7	103	53	+50	99
2	Preston North End	46	26	12	8	72	47	+25	90
3	Southend United	46	25	5	16	68	55	+13	80
4	Wolverhampton Wanderers	46	24	7	15	69	50	+19	79
5	Colchester United	46	21	7	18	64	56	+8	70
6	Aldershot	46	20	10	16	64	57	+7	70

This was the inaugural season of the Football League play-offs, which were introduced as part of the "Heathrow Agreement", a ten-point proposal to restructure the Football League. For the first two years of the play-offs, the team which had finished immediately above the relegation places in the Third Division competed with three clubs from the Fourth Division immediately below the promotion positions for promotion to the second tier of English football for the following season. The play-offs were not universally lauded: Oldham Athletic manager Joe Royle was scathing of them after losing in the semi-final of the Second Division play-offs, saying "We finished seven points clear of Leeds. So to go out on away goals to them means there is something unjust. I welcomed the play-offs but possibly hadn't considered the long-term ramifications." The Swindon Town manager Lou Macari was also dissatisfied with the play-offs, arguing "we have proved ourselves the better team over 46 games this season but then see our future decided in Cup-style matches".

Bolton Wanderers had finished the 1986–87 season in 21st place in the Third Division, one position above the relegation zone. Wolverhampton Wanderers ended the season in fourth position in the Fourth Division, one point behind Southend, who were automatically promoted in third place, eleven behind Preston North End who were promoted as runners-up, and twenty behind champions Northampton Town. Colchester United finished nine points behind Wolverhampton Wanderers in fifth place while Aldershot ended the season in sixth, also nine points behind Wolverhampton Wanderers but with inferior goal difference to Colchester United. Bolton, along with Wolverhampton Wanderers, Colchester United, and Aldershot thus competed in the play-offs.

Aldershot's opposition in their play-off semi-final were Bolton Wanderers, with the first match of the two-legged tie taking place at the Recreation Ground in Aldershot on 14 May 1987. The match ended 1–0 to Aldershot as Gary Johnson scored the only goal of the game in the 77th minute. The second leg was held three days later at Burnden Park in Bolton. Tony Caldwell scored a 50th minute penalty to level the tie on aggregate before Darren Anderson scored for Aldershot in the 76th minute. Caldwell's 81st minute goal meant extra time was required to decide the result. Glenn Burvill gave Aldershot the lead in the 103rd minute, and with no further goals, the tie ended 3–2 to Aldershot on aggregate. They progressed to the final while Bolton were relegated to the Fourth Division for the first time in their history.

Wolverhampton Wanderers faced Colchester United in the other semi-final, with the first leg being played at Layer Road in Colchester on 14 May 1987. Rob Kelly gave the visitors the lead in the 28th minute when he headed in a deflected cross from Steve Bull. Five minutes later, Bull himself scored when he converted a shot from Andy Thompson which had rebounded off the Colchester United goalpost. Mark Kendall, the Wolverhampton Wanderers goalkeeper, made a number of saves to keep a clean sheet and his side won 2–0. The second leg took place three days later at Molineux in Wolverhampton. The match ended goalless and Wolverhampton Wanderers progressed to the final with a 2–0 aggregate victory.

== Match ==
=== Background ===
Wolverhampton Wanderers had been involved in numerous promotions and relegations in the seasons leading up to this one. Having been relegated to the Second Division in the 1981–82 season, they were promoted the following year after finishing as runners-up. Three consecutive relegations followed, in 1983–84, 1984–85 and 1985–86 to leave them in the Fourth Division, the lowest tier of English football in which they had ever played. Aldershot had played in the Fourth Division since being relegated in the 1975–76 season. Wolverhampton Wanderers won both matches between the sides during the regular season. The game at the Recreation Ground in August 1986 ended 2–1 and the return match at Molineux in February 1987 saw Wolverhampton win 3–0.

=== First leg ===
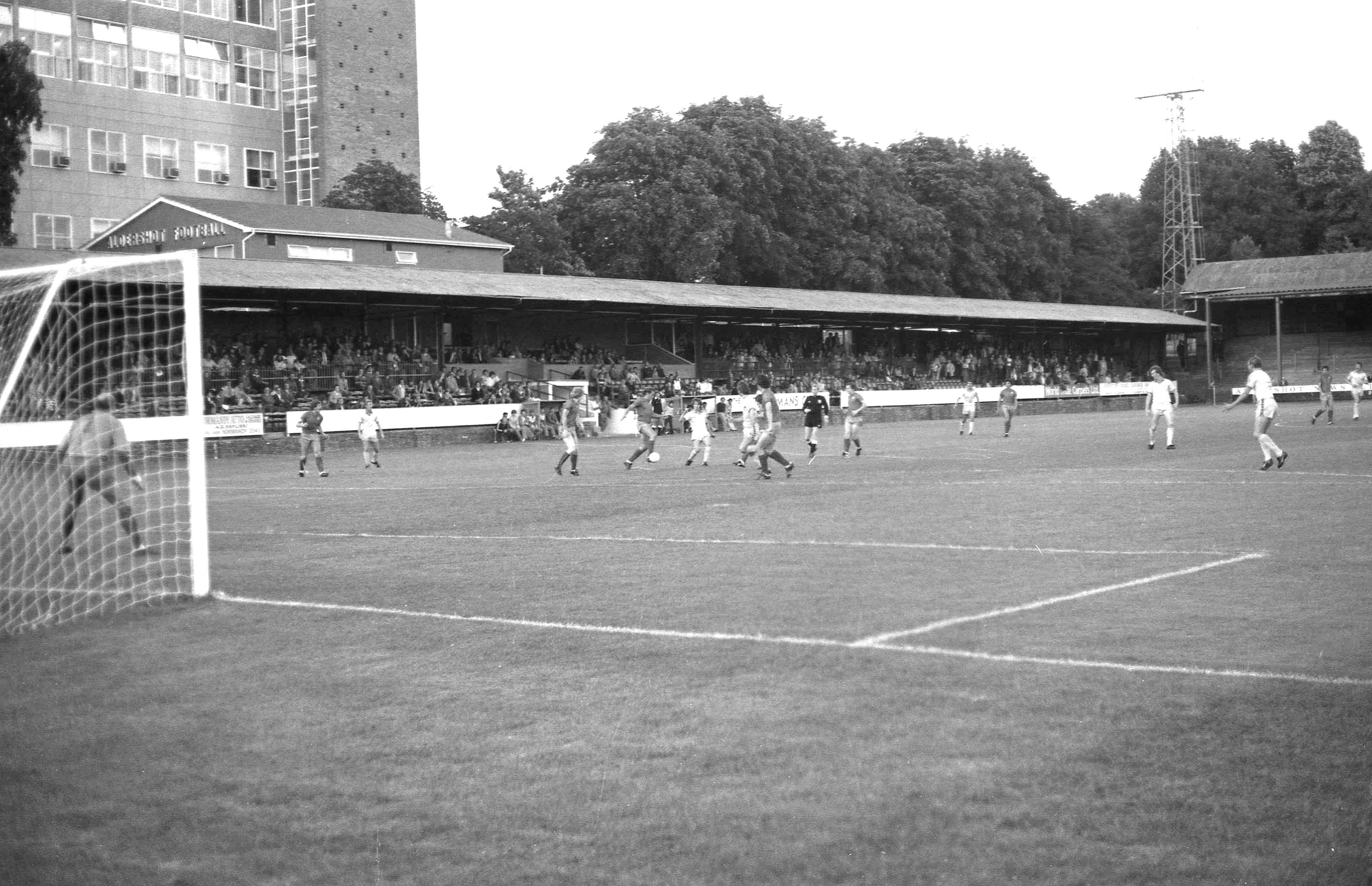
The first leg of the final took place at Aldershot's Recreation Ground.

==== Summary ====
The referee for the first leg, played on 22 May 1987 at the Recreation Ground in Aldershot in front of 5,069 spectators, was Allan Gunn. Conditions underfoot were poor with a heavily waterlogged pitch, and the first goal came about in the fourth minute when a number of players slipped, including Wolverhampton Wanderers captain Floyd Streete, and Ian McDonald scored. Kendall made a number of saves including one in the 40th minute to deny Mike Ring which Mike Ward, writing in the Sandwell Evening Mail, described as a "rescue act of quite stunning brilliance". Bull saw two attempts to score denied by Aldershot defenders before half-time and within thirty seconds of the start of the second half, Streete was adjudged to have handled the ball from a clearance by Nicky Clarke, his teammate. Bobby Barnes scored the resulting penalty. Bull then missed an opportunity to score in the 70th minute and the match ended in a 2–0 victory for Aldershot.

==== Details ====
22 May 1987	Aldershot	2–0	Wolverhampton Wanderers	Recreation Ground, Aldershot
19:45 BST	McDonald 4'; Barnes 47' (pen.)			Attendance: 5,069; Referee: Allan Gunn (Burgess Hill)

GK	1	Tony Lange
RB	2	Barry Blankley
CB	3	Paul Friar
CB	4	Andy King
LB	5	Colin Smith
RM	6	Steve Wignall
CM	7	Bobby Barnes
CM	8	Giorgio Mazzon
LM	9	Mike Ring
CF	10	Ian McDonald (c)
CF	11	Gary Johnson
Manager:
Len Walker

GK	1	Mark Kendall
RB	2	Steve Stoutt
CB	3	David Barnes
CB	4	Floyd Streete (c)
LB	5	Rob Kelly
RM	6	Nicky Clarke
CM	7	Jon Purdie
CM	8	Andy Thompson
FW	9	Steve Bull
FW	10	Andy Mutch
LM	11	Micky Holmes
Manager:
Graham Turner

=== Second leg ===
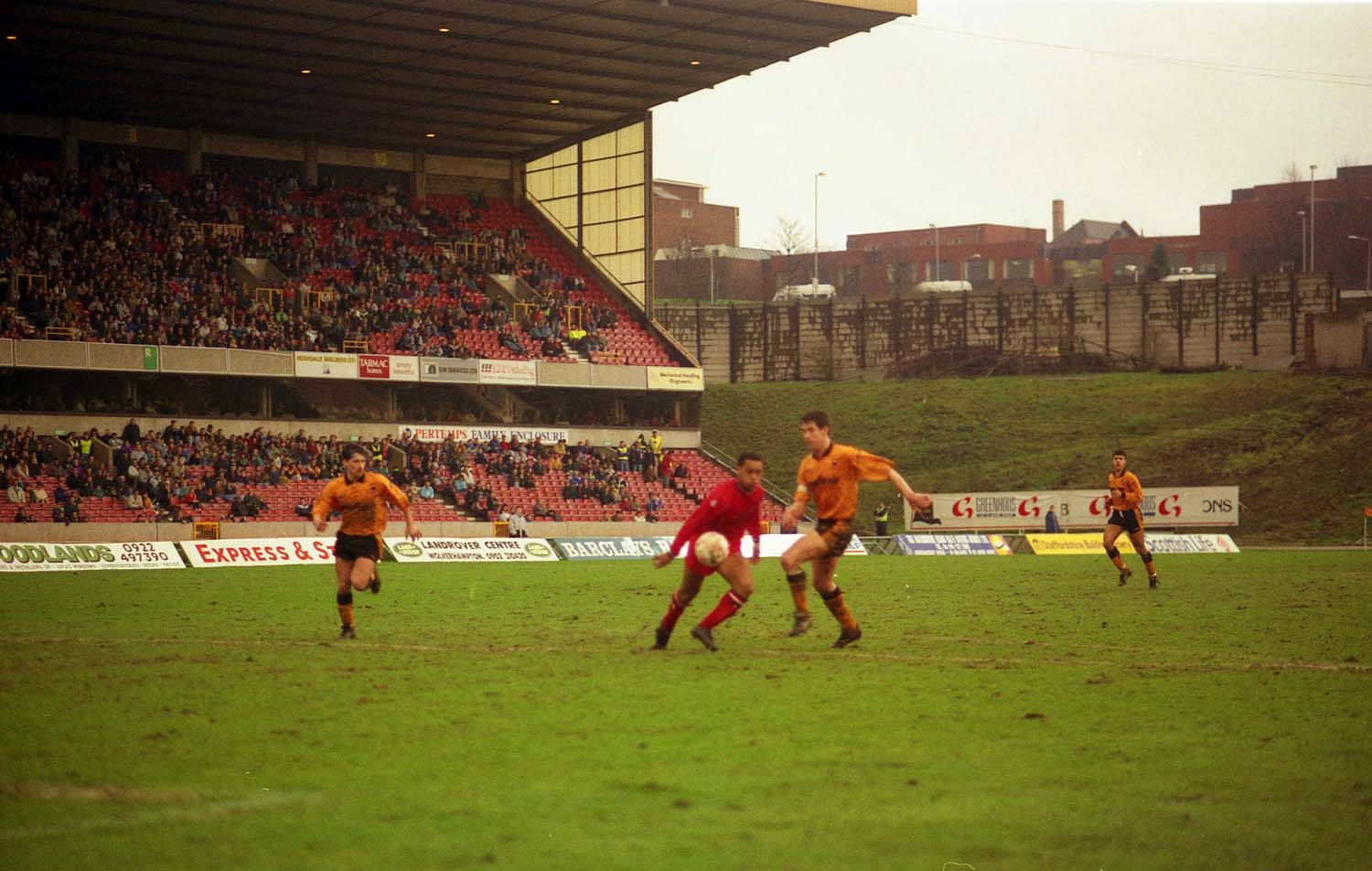
The second leg of the final was hosted by Molineux (pictured in 1991).

==== Summary ====
The referee for the second leg, played on 25 May 1987 at Molineux in Wolverhampton in front of a crowd of 19,962, was Keith Hackett. Wolverhampton Wanderers concentrated their efforts on playing long balls forward to their attackers, but according to Mike King of the Sandwell Evening Mail, they were met with "an unflinching Aldershot defence". In the ninth minute, Bull struck a shot high over the Aldershot crossbar and two minutes later, Barry Powell's strike from distance was tipped away by Tony Lange, the Aldershot goalkeeper. Just before the hour mark, Thompson shot high and off-target before Lange made another save, this time from a strike which took a deflection off Jon Purdie. With nine minutes of the match remaining, Barnes scored for Aldershot to give them a 1–0 win, and a 3–0 aggregate victory, securing promotion to the Third Division. After the final whistle, hundreds of Wolverhampton Wanderers supporters rushed on the 2,000 travelling Aldershot fans, attacking them and the police. Ten officers and a police horse were injured in the riot while forty-two people, including one Aldershot supporter, were arrested.

==== Details ====
25 May 1987	Wolverhampton Wanderers	0–1 (0–3 agg.)	Aldershot	Molineux, Wolverhampton
15:00 BST			Barnes 81'	Attendance: 19,962; Referee: Keith Hackett (Sheffield)

GK	1	Mark Kendall
RB	2	Steve Stoutt
CB	3	David Barnes
CB	4	Floyd Streete (c)
LB	5	Barry Powell
RM	6	Nicky Clarke
CM	7	Robbie Dennison
CM	8	Andy Thompson
FW	9	Steve Bull
FW	10	Andy Mutch
LM	11	Micky Holmes
Manager:
Graham Turner

GK	1	Tony Lange
RB	2	Barry Blankley
CB	3	Paul Friar
CB	4	Andy King
LB	5	Colin Smith
RM	6	Steve Wignall
CM	7	Bobby Barnes
CM	8	Giorgio Mazzon
LM	9	Mike Ring
CF	10	Ian McDonald (c)
CF	11	Gary Johnson
Manager:
Len Walker

== Post-match ==
Graham Turner, the Wolverhampton Wanderers manager, was disappointed and bemoaned the new method of determining the final team to be promoted, saying "I'm bitterly disappointed. We ended nine points clear of Aldershot in the table with a better goal difference, so that makes it even harder to swallow at the moment". His counterpart Len Walker was sympathetic, noting "It's sad Wolves finished fourth and we finished sixth, but we all knew the rules to start with". After the game, Aldershot teammates Giorgio Mazzon, Burvill and Anderson were involved in a road traffic accident which eventually led to Mazzon's retirement. Goalscorer Barnes later talked of the violence at Molineux, noting "Crowd trouble was frequent in the Eighties ... I'd played at Newcastle and had bananas thrown at me so I wouldn't have been phased by the trouble that day at Molineux."

Aldershot ended their following season in 20th position in the Third Division, one place and one point above the relegation play-off position. Wolverhampton Wanderers' next season saw them finish as champions of the Fourth Division, gaining automatic promotion to the Third Division for the 1988–89 season.
