= Darren Anderson =

Darren Anderson may refer to:

- Darren Anderson (American football) (born 1969), former American football player
- Darren Anderson (footballer) (born 1966), English footballer
- Darren Anderson (dancer) (born 1976), ballet dancer
