= Nick Clark =

Nick, Nicky or Nicholas Clark or Clarke may refer to:

- Nick Clarke (1948–2006), British radio and television presenter and journalist
- Nicky Clark (born 1991), Scottish footballer for Dunfermline Athletic
- Nicky Clarke (footballer) (born 1967), English footballer
- Nicholas Clark, footballer in the 2012–13 Stranraer F.C. season
- Nick Clark (character), a character in the television series Fear the Walking Dead
- Nicky Clarke (born 1958), English hair stylist and media personality

== See also ==
- Nicholas Goodrick-Clarke (1953–2012), British historian and professor
