= Barry Blankley =

English football defender

Personal information
- Full name: Barry Steven Blankley
- Date of birth: 27 October 1964 (age 62)
- Place of birth: Farnborough, Hampshire, England
- Height: 5 ft 8 in (1.73 m)
- Position: Defender

Senior career*
Years	Team	Apps	(Gls)
1983–1984	Southampton	0	(0)
1984–1987	Aldershot	90	(0)
1987–1989	Woking		
1990	Bashley		
1991	Farnborough Town		
1992	Basingstoke Town		
1993	Bashley		
1993	Salisbury City		
- * Club domestic league appearances and goals

Barry Steven Blankley (born 27 October 1964) is an English former professional footballer who played in the Football League for Aldershot. He later appeared for several non-league clubs in the south of England, including a spell as assistant manager at Salisbury City.

== Honours ==
Aldershot

- Football League Fourth Division play-offs: 1987
