= Steve Stoutt =

English footballer and caretaker manager

Personal information
- Full name: Stephen Paul Stoutt
- Date of birth: 5 April 1964 (age 62)
- Place of birth: Halifax, England
- Height: 5 ft 8 in (1.73 m)
- Position: Defender

Senior career*
Years	Team	Apps	(Gls)
- Bradley Rangers
1984–1985	Huddersfield Town	6	(0)
1985–1988	Wolverhampton Wanderers	94	(5)
1988–1990	Grimsby Town	3	(1)
1990–1991	Lincoln City	46	(1)
1991–1993	Boston United	64	(10)
1995–1996	Grantham Town		

Managerial career
- 1996: Grantham Town (caretaker manager)
- * Club domestic league appearances and goals

Stephen Paul Stoutt (born 6 April 1964) is an English former professional footballer who made 149 appearances in the Football League playing as a defender for Huddersfield Town, Wolverhampton Wanderers, Grimsby Town and Lincoln City. He went on to play non-league football for Boston United and Grantham Town, where he was briefly caretaker manager.

== Career ==
=== Huddersfield Town ===
Stoutt joined Huddersfield Town at the age of 13, the club he had supported as a schoolboy but was not taken on as a pro, instead taking a non-contact and only being paid as and when he was required. Stoutt turned out regularly for the reserves but had been allowed very few chances in a first team that included players like Sam Allardyce and Steve Kindon.

Two of these first team matches in the 1984/85 season were against Wolverhampton Wanderers F.C. who signed Stoutt that following summer.

=== Wolverhampton Wanderers ===
Stoutt joined from Huddersfield on 1 August 1985, joining Wolves whilst they were playing in the English 3rd Division. This is a poignant time in Wolves history as the club found themselves in a period of downward trajectory from topflight football towards the fourth tier.

Stoutt made his club debut on the bench during the opening day of the 1985/86 season clash away at Brentford alongside follow debutants Nicky Clarke, Johnny Morrissey, Jon Purdie and Neil Edwards.

The Wolves squad, which contained teenager Tim Flowers in goal, was further bolstered by the addition of Andy Mutch mid-season but this was not enough to see Wolves fortunes change and an eventual 23rd place finish saw the club relegated for the third consecutive season.

The following season saw a degree of stabilisation for the club with a 4th place finish in Division 4 with Stoutt starting 44 league matches.

The 1986/87 season was the first season to have the inclusion of Playoffs for the final promotion places and was introduced across the various tiers of the English Football League. Having finished 4th, Wolves went into the playoffs as favourites and reached the final where they would play Aldershot Town across two legs. Stoutt would feature at right back for both fixtures which would finish Aldershot 3-0 Wolves on aggregate across the two legs, seeing Aldershot, who had finished 9 points behind Wolves in the league promoted at the expense of Wolves.

This season also coincided with the arrival of Steve Bull and Andy Thompson who would both prove to become pivotal signings in the history for the club who joined in November 1986. However Stoutt was clearly a fan favourite at the time and managed to eclipse these two Wolves legends by being voted the 1987 Wolves Player of the Year. Stoutt was noted for his strong defensive displays and key goals versus Preston North End and his native Halifax Town.

1987/88 saw Wolves push on and start their recovery, with progression back towards the top tier beginning here with Wolves securing automatic promotion to Division 3 as league champions scoring 90 points. Stoutt remained a key figure in the squad starting 21 league matches this season, but this was half that of the previous campaign. This was due to increased competition for places after Wolves made the signing of Gary Bellamy who operated in a similar position.

Only a few weeks had passed since Wolves had been crowned 87/88 Division 4 Champions and they would be celebrating again, this time due to defeating Burnley at Wembley to win the Sherpa Van Trophy Final, however Stoutt would not feature in the squad for the famous trip to Wembley and was released 48 hours after the final victory alongside Jon Purdie, Micky Holmes and Matt Forman.

=== Grimsby Town ===
Stoutt joined Grimsby in July 1988 but made very few appearances due to a knee injury and was sold to Lincoln City F.C. for £9000 in 1989.

== Post Football ==
After Football, Stoutt returned to his Milk Round he had enjoyed at a younger age and served on his route as a Milkman for over 14 years.

== Honours ==
Wolverhampton Wanderers

- Football League Fourth Division: 1987–88
- Associate Members' Cup: 1987–88

Individual

- Wolverhampton Wanderers Player of the Season: 1986
