= Ivan Nagy =

Ivan Nagy may refer to:

- Ivan Boszormenyi-Nagy (1920–2007), Hungarian-American psychiatrist
- Iván Nagy (director) (1938–2015), Hungarian-American film director
- Ivan Nagy (dancer) (1943–2014), Hungarian dancer
