= Giorgio Mazzon =

English footballer

Personal information
- Full name: Giorgio Mazzon
- Date of birth: 4 September 1960 (age 66)
- Place of birth: Waltham Cross, England
- Height: 5 ft 11 in (1.80 m)
- Position: Central defender

Senior career*
Years	Team	Apps	(Gls)
1977–1978	Cheshunt	1	(0)
1978–1979	Hertford Town		
1979–1982	Tottenham Hotspur	4	(0)
1983–1988	Aldershot	195	(6)
- * Club domestic league appearances and goals

Giorgio Mazzon (born 4 September 1960) is an English former professional footballer who played for Cheshunt, Hertford Town, Tottenham Hotspur and Aldershot.

== Football career ==
Mazzon a central defender joined Tottenham from non-league Hertford Town in April 1979 having previously made one appearance for Cheshunt in February 1978 against Epping Town. He played a total of seven games for the White Hart Lane club including three as substitute in all competitions. He featured in one match of the 1980-81 FA Cup run in the 6th round tie against Exeter City. He transferred to Aldershot in August 1983 and made 195 appearances including 11 as sub and scoring six goals between 1983–88 before being seriously injured in a car accident which ended his career.

== Honours ==
Aldershot

- Football League Fourth Division play-offs: 1987
