= Mike Ring =

English footballer

Personal information
- Full name: Michael Paul Ring
- Date of birth: 13 February 1961 (age 65)
- Place of birth: Brighton, England
- Height: 5 ft 10 in (1.78 m)
- Position: Winger

Senior career*
Years	Team	Apps	(Gls)
1981–1984	Brighton & Hove Albion	5	(0)
1981–1982	→ Greenock Morton (loan)	4	(0)
1983–1984	Ballymena United		
1984–1986	Hull City	24	(2)
1985–1986	→ Bolton Wanderers (loan)	3	(0)
1986–1989	Aldershot	76	(16)
- Lewes
Total		115	(18)
- * Club domestic league appearances and goals

Michael Paul Ring (born 13 February 1961) is an English former footballer who played in the Football League for Brighton & Hove Albion, Hull City, Bolton Wanderers and Aldershot.

== Honours ==
Aldershot

- Football League Fourth Division play-offs: 1987
