= 1991–92 Aldershot F.C. season =

English football club season

Aldershot Football Club played the 1991–92 season in the Fourth Division; however, financial problems led to the club being wound up in the High Court before the season’s end.

The club played 36 league games during the season, winning just three times. The club also suffered first-round exits in both the League Cup and FA Cup to Peterborough United and Enfield, respectively.

Manager Brian Talbot resigned in November 1991 and was succeeded by Ian McDonald.

On 25 March 1992, Aldershot F.C. finally went out of business and were obliged to resign from the Football League. Results of the club’s fixtures were declared void. The club had been in existence for 66 years, the last 60 of which had been spent in the Football League, with the club having never progressed beyond the Third Division and having spent most of its post-1958 existence in the Fourth Division.

The final game played was a 2–0 defeat against Cardiff City at Ninian Park on 20 March 1992. The last home game was a 3–0 defeat to Lincoln City, also in the league, on 14 March 1992. Aldershot's final eight competitive games all ended in defeat, and they had not won any of their final 16 games; their last competitive win was on 28 December 1991 away to Maidstone United in the Fourth Division. Maidstone also went out of business and had to leave the Football League just five months after Aldershot's demise.

A new club, Aldershot Town, was formed within weeks of the old club’s demise, continuing to play at the Recreation Ground but competing five divisions lower.

== Results ==
Date	Opponent	Venue	Result	Competition
Tuesday 20 August 1991	Peterborough United	Away	Lost 3–1	League Cup 1st Round, 1st Leg
Saturday 24 August 1991	Burnley	Away	Lost 2–0	Division 4
Tuesday 27 August 1991	Peterborough United	Home	Lost 2–1 (Lost 5–2 on agg)	League Cup 1st Round, 2nd Leg
Saturday 31 August 1991	Maidstone United	Home	Won 3–0	Division 4
