= David Mitchell (footballer, born 1990) =

Scottish footballer

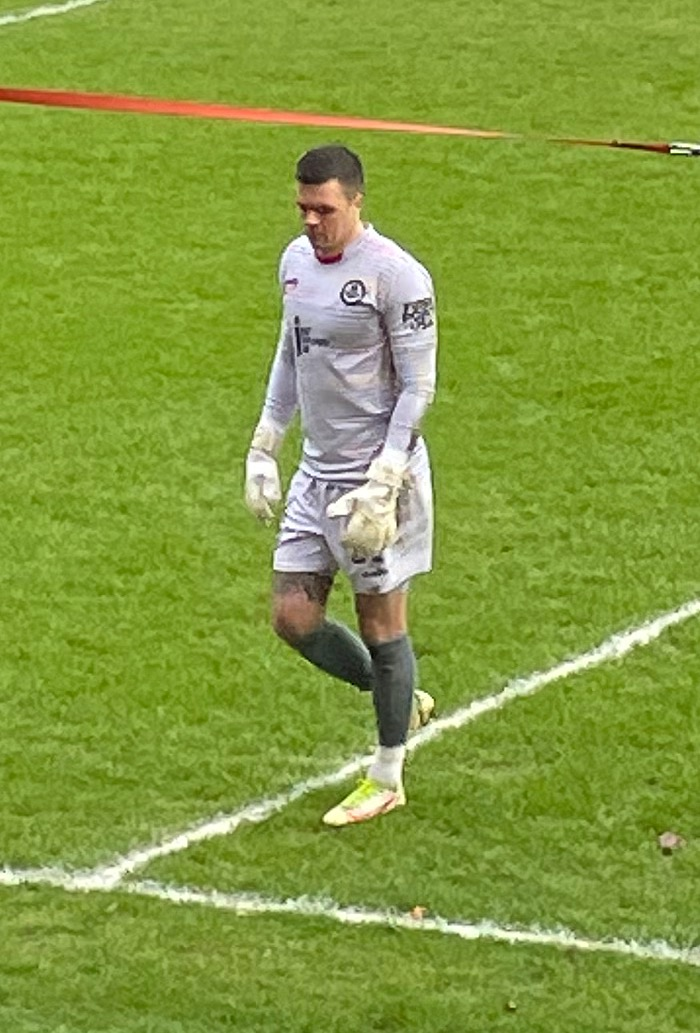
- Mitchell with Partick Thistle

Personal information
- Date of birth: 4 April 1990 (age 36)
- Place of birth: Irvine, Scotland
- Position: Goalkeeper

Team information
- Current team: Queen's Park
- Number: 1

Youth career
- Ayr United

Senior career*
Years	Team	Apps	(Gls)
2008–2010	Ayr United	0	(0)
2009–2010	→ Stranraer (loan)	35	(0)
2010–2015	Stranraer	159	(0)
2015–2017	Dundee	6	(0)
2017–2019	Falkirk	12	(0)
2019–2021	Clyde	39	(0)
2021–2022	Hibernian	0	(0)
2022–2025	Partick Thistle	43	(0)
2025–2026	Ayr United	22	(0)
2026–	Queen's Park	6	(0)
- * Club domestic league appearances and goals as of 13:21, 13 November 2026 (UTC)

David Mitchell (born 4 April 1990) is a Scottish footballer who plays as a goalkeeper for Scottish Championship club Queen's Park. Mitchell has previously played for Ayr United, Stranraer, Dundee, Falkirk, Clyde, Hibernian and Partick Thistle

== Career ==
=== Stranraer ===
After beginning his career at Ayr United without featuring in the first team, Mitchell joined Stranraer on loan in July 2009, then made the move permanent in June 2010. He stated that his decision to make the initial loan move was to achieve his ambition of first team football which he felt he wouldn't get at Ayr. Mitchell was part of the club's successful promotion campaign in 2012, when having initially lost against Albion Rovers in the play-offs, Stranraer were promoted to the Scottish Second Division due to the demise of Rangers. During the 2014–15 season, Scottish Championship side Hibernian were reported to be interested in signing Mitchell.

=== Dundee ===
In June 2015, Mitchell agreed a pre-contract with Dundee. He made his debut on 20 March 2016 in the Dundee derby against Dundee United, coming on as a substitute following a red card for Scott Bain. He left Dundee at the end of the 2016–17 season.

=== Falkirk ===
On 1 June 2017, Mitchell agreed a contract with Falkirk.

=== Clyde ===
On 24 May 2019, Mitchell signed for Clyde on a one-year contract, and on 16 January 2020 signed a two-and-a-half-year contract extension.

=== Hibernian ===
He moved to Premiership club Hibernian in August 2021, and left them in June 2022 without having played a first-team game.

=== Partick Thistle ===
After leaving Hibs Mitchell joined Scottish Championship club Partick Thistle in June 2022, on a two-year deal.

After making 50 appearances in all competitions over two seasons with the club, Mitchell signed a one-year contract extension with Thistle in May 2024, extending his deal until June 2025.

=== Ayr United ===
On June 3rd 2025 Mitchell rejoins the team he started his career with, signing a 2 year contract with Scottish Championship club, Scott Brown's Ayr United.

=== Queen's Park ===
In summer 2026 Mitchell moved to Queen's Park after the departure of Spiders no.1 goalkeeper Calum Ferrie to Kilmarnock.

== Career statistics ==
As of 9 July 2019

Appearances and goals by club, season and competition
Club	Season	League			Scottish Cup		League Cup		Other		Total	
Club	Season	Division	Apps	Goals	Apps	Goals	Apps	Goals	Apps	Goals	Apps	Goals
Ayr United	2009–10	Scottish First Division	0	0	0	0	0	0	0	0	0	0
Stranraer (loan)	2009–10	Scottish Third Division	35	0	1	0	1	0	2 (Note: Appearances in the Scottish Challenge Cup)	0	39	0
Stranraer	2010–11	Scottish Third Division	32	0	5	0	0	0	1	0	38	0
Stranraer	2011–12	Scottish Third Division	24	0	3	0	1	0	5 (Note: One appearance in the Scottish Challenge Cup and four in the Second Division play-offs)	0	33	0
Stranraer	2012–13	Scottish Second Division	32	0	3	0	1	0	1	0	37	0
Stranraer	2013–14	Scottish League One	36	0	6	0	3	0	4 (Note: Two appearances in the Scottish Challenge Cup and two in the Championship play-offs)	0	49	0
Stranraer	2014–15	Scottish League One	35	0	4	0	2	0	6 (Note: Four appearances in the Scottish Challenge Cup and two in the Championship play-offs)	0	47	0
Stranraer	Total		159	0	21	0	7	0	17	0	204	0
Dundee	2015–16	Scottish Premiership	2	0	0	0	0	0	0	0	2	0
Dundee	2016–17	Scottish Premiership	2	0	0	0	2	0	0	0	4	0
Dundee	Total		4	0	0	0	2	0	0	0	6	0
Falkirk	2017–18	Scottish Championship	1	0	0	0	1	0	1	0	3	0
Falkirk	2018–19	Scottish Championship	9	0	0	0	0	0	0	0	9	0
Falkirk	Total		10	0	0	0	1	0	1	0	12	0
Clyde	2019–20	Scottish League One	0	0	0	0	0	0	0	0	0	0
Career total			208	0	22	0	11	0	20	0	261	0
