= Ian McDonald (footballer, born 1953) =

English footballer and manager

Personal information
- Full name: Ian Clifford McDonald
- Date of birth: 10 May 1953 (age 73)
- Place of birth: Barrow-in-Furness, England
- Height: 5 ft 9 in (1.75 m)
- Position: Midfielder

Senior career*
Years	Team	Apps	(Gls)
1971–1973	Barrow	36	(2)
1973–1974	Workington	42	(4)
1974–1975	Liverpool	0	(0)
1975	Colchester United	5	(2)
1975–1977	Mansfield Town	56	(4)
1977–1981	York City	175	(29)
1981–1988	Aldershot	340	(50)
Total		654	(91)

Managerial career
- 1991–1992: Aldershot (caretaker)
- 2013–2014: Workington
- * Club domestic league appearances and goals

Ian Clifford McDonald (born 10 May 1953) is an English former footballer and manager.

== Career ==
Born in Barrow-in-Furness, Lancashire, McDonald began his career with his hometown club Barrow before joining Workington. A move to Liverpool followed but he did not break into the first team, and was loaned to Colchester United before joining Mansfield Town in July 1975, with whom he won the Third Division title in 1976–77.

He moved to York City where he became a regular in midfield before joining Aldershot in November 1981, in exchange for Malcolm Crosby. At Aldershot he gained renown as a skilful midfielder and captained the side to promotion to the Third Division under Len Walker in 1987. After leaving League football in 1989 to join Farnborough Town, he returned to Aldershot as caretaker manager following the resignation of Brian Talbot in November 1991.

However, the Hampshire club was now deep in debt and struggling back in the Fourth Division, having narrowly avoided going out of business the previous year. Staff wages regularly went unpaid, and many players moved elsewhere just to seek a guaranteed wage. McDonald often had to resort to recruiting amateur footballers just to be able to field a full side.

McDonald stayed with Aldershot until the club finally went out of business and left the Football League on 25 March 1992. His assistant Steve Wignall was appointed manager of the new Aldershot Town club which was formed several weeks later, and that summer McDonald made his own football comeback as a reserve team coach at Millwall. Later in 1992, McDonald had his own testimonial with the new Aldershot side at the Recreation Ground against Southampton. He later worked part-time in schools support in the Barrow-in-Furness area.

On 16 December 2013, McDonald returned to football management when he was appointed manager of Workington, the club he played for forty years earlier. He was Workington manager until April 2014, being replaced in May 2014 by Gavin Skelton.

== After Football ==
McDonald now serves the Barrow-in-Furness community by acting as an invigilator for GCSE examinations at Chetwynde School.

== Honours ==
Mansfield Town

- Football League Third Division: 1976–77

Aldershot

- Football League Fourth Division play-offs: 1987

Individual

- York City Clubman of the Year: 1979–80
