= Len Walker =

English footballer and manager

Personal information
- Full name: Leonard Walker
- Date of birth: 4 March 1944 (age 82)
- Place of birth: Darlington, England
- Position: Half-back

Youth career
- 1959–1960: Middlesbrough
- 1960–1963: Spennymoor United

Senior career*
Years	Team	Apps	(Gls)
1963–1964	Newcastle United	1	(0)
1964–1976	Aldershot	449	(23)
1976–1978	Darlington	10	(0)
Total		460	(23)

Managerial career
- 1978–1979: Darlington
- 1981–1984: Aldershot
- 1985–1991: Aldershot
- * Club domestic league appearances and goals

Leonard Walker (born 4 March 1944) is an English former football player and manager. He was the manager of Aldershot from July 1981 until November 1984, and then June 1985 until 11 April 1991.

== Playing career ==
Walker was born in Darlington and started his football career as a trainee with Middlesbrough. After a spell in non-league football with Spennymoor United he returned to the Football League with Newcastle United in May 1963.

In July 1964, he moved to Hampshire to join Aldershot where he played for the next twelve seasons, making nearly 500 appearances in all competitions. He also became the club's regular penalty taker; of his 23 league goals, 18 came from the penalty spot. He was an ever-present in 1966–67. He also captained the side, and helped them win their first promotion from the Fourth Division in 1973.

In August 1976, he returned to his native north-east with Darlington. After two years, he retired from playing and took over as manager in October 1978.

== Management career ==
=== Darlington ===
His spell as manager at Darlington only lasted until the end of the 1978–79 season, when he lost his job, being replaced by Billy Elliott.

=== Aldershot ===
In January 1981, he was appointed manager of his former club, Aldershot. Apart from finishing one place outside of promotion in 1984, Walker achieved little of note during his first spell as manager, and was sacked later that year after the club's new owners decided to replace him with the higher-profile Ron Harris. Harris moved on at the end of that season however, which led to Walker being re-appointed. During his second spell as manager, Aldershot achieved promotion from the Fourth Division in 1987 - only the second promotion in their Football League history.

They spent two years in the Third Division before being relegated, but the board kept faith in Walker, even though Aldershot struggled back in the basement division and in 1990 only just avoided relegation to the Conference National.

On 31 July 1990, Aldershot was wound up in the High Court due to six-figure debts that had rendered the club "hopelessly insolvent", and it looked as though Walker and everyone else at the club would soon be without a job. But the club was rescued by 19-year-old property speculator Spencer Trethewy, and Walker's job was saved.

Walker moved to the role of General Manager on 11 April 1991 after 10 years as team manager, and first team duties were taken over by new player-manager Brian Talbot. Financial problems continued to plague the club and it finally went out of business on 25 March 1992. Walker had been on the club's payroll as General Manager to the end.

Since then he has done scouting work for various league clubs, Nottingham Forest amongst them.

== Managerial statistics ==
Team	Nat	From	To	Record				
Team	Nat	From	To	G	W	L	D	Win %
Darlington	(England)	October 1978	June 1979	36	9	15	12	25.0
Aldershot	(England)	1981	1984					
Aldershot	(England)	June 1985	April 1991					

== Honours ==
=== As a manager ===
Aldershot

- Football League Fourth Division play-offs: 1987
