= 2012–13 Stranraer F.C. season =

Stranraer
2012–13 season
- Chairman: Alex Connor
- Manager: Keith Knox (Until 22 October 2012); Stephen Aitken (From 27 October 2012)
- Stadium: Stair Park
- Second Division: Eighth place
- Challenge Cup: First Round, lost to Stenhousemuir
- League Cup: First Round, lost to Livingston
- Scottish Cup: Fourth Round, lost to Dundee United
- Top goalscorer: League: Craig Malcolm (18); All: Craig Malcolm (19)
- Highest home attendance: 1,089 vs Dundee United; Scottish Cup; 1 December 2012
- Lowest home attendance: 169 vs Arbroath; Second Division; 19 February 2013

The 2012–13 season was Stranraer's first season back in the Scottish Second Division. Stranraer also competed in the Challenge Cup, League Cup and the Scottish Cup. They were due to play in their fourth consecutive season in the Scottish Third Division, having been relegated from the Scottish Second Division at the end of the 2008–09 season. On 16 July 2012, it was confirmed that Stranraer would be promoted to the Scottish Second Division to fill the vacancy's left by Dundee's promotion to the Scottish Premier League and Airdrie United's promotion to the Scottish First Division. This was to fill the slot vacated by Rangers, who were voted into the Scottish Third Division following their liquidation.

== Summary ==
=== Season ===
Stranraer finished eighth in the Scottish Second Division. They reached the first round of the Challenge Cup, the first round of the League Cup and the fourth round of the Scottish Cup.

=== Management ===
Stranraer began the season under the management of Keith Knox. On 22 October 2012, Knox was sacked by the club following unacceptable results, with Knox's assistant Stephen Aitken taking over as interim manager following his departure. After the Forfar Athletic match on 27 October 2012, Aitken was given the manager's job on a permanent basis.

== Results & fixtures ==
Win Draw Loss Postponed

=== Second Division ===
11 August 2012 Scottish Second Division	Stranraer	1 – 1	Arbroath	Stair Park
15:00	Moore 22'	SFL Report	Gribben 45'	Attendance: 290; Referee: Anderson

18 August 2012 Scottish Second Division	Forfar Athletic	4 – 0	Stranraer	Station Park
15:00	Swankie 8'; Denholm 50'; Staunton 52'; Fotheringham 67'	SFL Report		Attendance: 449; Referee: Aitken

25 August 2012 Scottish Second Division	Stranraer	1 – 1	Stenhousemuir	Stair Park
15:00	Borris 58'	SFL Report	McMillan 19'	Attendance: 290; Referee: Graham

1 September 2012 Scottish Second Division	Stranraer	2 – 0	Ayr United	Stair Park
15:00	Malcolm 34', 38'	SFL Report	Hunter (yellow card) 90' (red card)	Attendance: 772; Referee: Cook

15 September 2012 Scottish Second Division	Albion Rovers	2 – 1	Stranraer	Cliftonhill Stadium
15:00	Crooks 49'; McGuigan 80'	SFL Report	Aitken 60'	Attendance: 376; Referee: Robertson

22 September 2012 Scottish Second Division	Alloa Athletic	3 – 0	Stranraer	Recreation Park
15:00	Cawley 21'; Grehan 45+3' (Penalty); Holmes 90'	SFL Report	Mitchell (red card) 45'	Attendance: 429; Referee: Anderson

29 September 2012 Scottish Second Division	Stranraer	2 – 6	East Fife	Stair Park
15:00	Borris 44'; Malcolm 78'	East Fife Report	Barr 23'; McManus 33'; Wardlaw 42', 71'; Pollock 57', 66'	Attendance: 292; Referee: Somers

6 October 2012 Scottish Second Division	Stranraer	0 – 2	Queen of the South	Stair Park
15:00		SFL Report	Reilly 28'; Clark 91'	Attendance: 1,015; Referee: Cook

20 October 2012 Scottish Second Division	Brechin City	3 – 0	Stranraer	Glebe Park
15:00	Jackson 27', 31'; McKenna 65'	SFL Report		Attendance: 485; Referee: Graham

27 October 2012 Scottish Second Division	Stranraer	4 – 1	Forfar Athletic	Stair Park
15:00	Malcolm 4', 73'; Aitken 40' (red card) 90'; McKeown 90'	SFL Report	Denholm 28'	Attendance: 258; Referee: Robertson

17 November 2012 Scottish Second Division	Ayr United	2 – 1	Stranraer	Somerset Park
15:00	Moffat 57' (pen.), 90'; McStay (red card) 81'	SFL Report	Moore 31'	Attendance: 1,006; Referee: Hilland

21 November 2012 Scottish Second Division	Arbroath	2 – 1	Stranraer	Gayfield Park
19:45	Currie 23'; Doris 90'	SFL Report	Love 46'	Attendance: 387; Referee: Northcroft

24 November 2012 Scottish Second Division	Stranraer	1 – 1	Albion Rovers	Stair Park
15:00	Malcolm 90' (Penalty)	SFL Report	Crawford 39'	Attendance: 298; Referee: Robertson

8 December 2012 Scottish Second Division	East Fife	P – P	Stranraer	Bayview Stadium
15:00		BBC Report

15 December 2012 Scottish Second Division	Stranraer	3 – 2	Alloa Athletic	Stair Park
15:00	Dunlop 44'; Malcolm 56'; Love 79'	SFL Report	Holmes 61'; Thomson 81'	Attendance: 245; Referee: McKendrick

18 December 2012 Scottish Second Division	East Fife	0 – 1	Stranraer	Bayview Stadium
19:45		SFL Report	Malcolm 34'	Attendance: 441; Referee: Anderson

26 December 2012 Scottish Second Division	Queen of the South	4 – 1	Stranraer	Palmerston Park
15:00	Clark 31', 63', 70'; Smith 84'	BBC Sport	McKeown 20'	Attendance: 2,122; Referee: Graham

29 December 2012 Scottish Second Division	Stranraer	0 – 2	Brechin City	Stair Park
15:00		SFL Report	Trouten 12' (Penalty); Carcary 62'	Attendance: 326; Referee: Roache

2 January 2013 Scottish Second Division	Albion Rovers	2 – 3	Stranraer	Cliftonhill
15:00	Howarth 55'; Russell (yellow card) 84' (red card); Stevenson 87'	SFL Report	Aitken 14', 86' (Penalty); Boris 20'	Attendance: 367; Referee: Cook

5 January 2013 Scottish Second Division	Stranraer	0 – 1	Ayr United	Stair Park
15:00		SFL Report	Winters 38'	Attendance: 803; Referee: Madden

12 January 2013 Scottish Second Division	Stenhousemuir	0 – 0	Stranraer	Ochilview Park
15:00		SFL Sport		Attendance: 484; Referee: Northcroft

19 January 2013 Scottish Second Division	Stranraer	P – P	Arbroath	Stair Park
15:00		BBC Report
Note: Postponed due to frozen pitch

26 January 2013 Scottish Second Division	Alloa Athletic	4 – 1	Stranraer	Recreation Park
15:00	McCord 32'; Megginson 60'; Holmes 67', 73'	SFL Report	Gallagher 59'	Attendance: 451; Referee: Graham

2 February 2013 Scottish Second Division	Stranraer	3 – 1	East Fife	Stair Park
15:00	Gribben 9', 29'; Winter 58'	SFL Report	Willis 53'	Attendance: 254; Referee: Colvin

9 February 2013 Scottish Second Division	Brechin City	P – P	Stranraer	Glebe Park
15:00		BBC Report
Note: Postponed due to a waterlogged pitch

16 February 2013 Scottish Second Division	Stranraer	0 – 5	Queen of the South	Stair Park
15:00	Mitchell (red card) 21'	SFL Report	Burns 17'; McGuffie 24' (pen.); Lyle 39', 71'; Clark 59'	Attendance: 810; Referee: Salmond

19 February 2013 Scottish Second Division	Stranraer	2 – 0	Arbroath	Stair Park
19:45	Morrison 21' (Own goal); Love 58'	SFL Report		Attendance: 169; Referee: Aitken

23 February 2013 Scottish Second Division	Stranraer	1 – 1	Stenhousemuir	Stair Park
15:00	Gribben 3'	SFL Report	McKinlay 22'	Attendance: 346; Referee: Robertson

2 March 2013 Scottish Second Division	Forfar Athletic	3 – 1	Stranraer	Station Park
15:00	Malin 18'; Kader 44'; Templeman 45+1'; Bolochoweckyj (red card) 79'	SFL Report	Malcolm 63'	Attendance: 448; Referee: Robertson

9 March 2013 Scottish Second Division	Stranraer	3 – 2	Albion Rovers	Stair Park
15:00	Malcolm 40', 56', 74'	SFL Report	Crawford 6'; Walker 27'; Green (red card) 70'	Attendance: 266; Referee: Graham

19 March 2013 Scottish Second Division	Brechin City	P – P	Stranraer	Glebe Park
19:45		BBC Report
Note: Postponed due to a waterlogged pitch

16 March 2013 Scottish Second Division	Ayr United	2 – 1	Stranraer	Somerset Park
15:00	Hunter 8'; Donald 11'	SFL Report	Malcolm 68'	Attendance: 1,022; Referee: Hilland

23 March 2013 Scottish Second Division	East Fife	P – P	Stranraer	Bayview Stadium
15:00		BBC Report
Note: Postponed due to high winds

30 March 2013 Scottish Second Division	Stranraer	1 – 2	Alloa Athletic	Stair Park
15:00	Love 87'	SFL Report	Holmes 55'; McCord 68'	Attendance: 322; Referee: Roache

6 April 2013 Scottish Second Division	Stranraer	3 – 2	Brechin City	Stair Park
15:00	Malcolm 28' (Penalty), 71'; Aitken 76'	SFL Report	Carcary 35'; McLean 39'	Attendance: 299; Referee: McKendrick

9 April 2013 Scottish Second Division	East Fife	1 – 1	Stranraer	Bayview Stadium
19:45	McBride 90+1' (Penalty)	BBC Report	Gribben 62'	Attendance: 426; Referee: Robertson

13 April 2013 Scottish Second Division	Queen of the South	2 – 0	Stranraer	Palmerston Park
15:00	Holt 31'; Clark 76'	SFL Report		Attendance: 1,806; Referee: Graham

20 April 2013 Scottish Second Division	Arbroath	1 – 0	Stranraer	Gayfield Park
15:00	Sheerin 25'	SFL Report		Attendance: 562; Referee: Cook

23 April 2013 Scottish Second Division	Brechin City	2 – 2	Stranraer	Glebe Park
19:45	Jackson 57'; Trouten 83'	SFL Report	One 44'; Malcolm 86'	Attendance: 401; Referee: Finnie

27 April 2013 Scottish Second Division	Stranraer	0 – 3	Forfar Athletic	Stair Park
15:00		SFL Report	Dunlop 10' (Own goal); Templeman 28'; Kader 69'	Attendance: 422; Referee: Robertson

4 May 2013 Scottish Second Division	Stenhousemuir	1 – 2	Stranraer	Ochilview Park
15:00	Gemmell 22'; Ross (yellow card) 90+1' (yellow-red card)	SFL Report	Malcolm 4', 44' (Penalty)	Attendance: 818; Referee: O'Reilly

=== Scottish Challenge Cup ===
28 July 2012 Scottish Challenge Cup round 1	Stranraer	1 – 2	Stenhousemuir	Stair Park
15:00	Winter 71'	SFL Report	Gemmell 36'; Ferguson 86'	Attendance: 306; Referee: Roache

=== Scottish League Cup ===
4 August 2012 Scottish League Cup round 1	Stranraer	0 – 8	Livingston	Stair Park
15:00		SFL Report	Morton 17', 87'; McNulty 23', 66', 83'; Russell 39', 80'; McCann 62'	Attendance: 284; Referee: Hilland

=== Scottish Cup ===
3 November 2012 Scottish Cup round 3	Stranraer	1 – 1	Queen's Park	Stair Park
15:00	Malcolm 72'	BBC Report	Anderson 52'	Attendance: 344; Referee: Robertson

10 November 2012 Scottish Cup Round Replay	Queen's Park	0 – 4	Stranraer	Hampden Park
15:00	Capuano (yellow card) 60' (yellow-red card); Brough (red card) 68'	BBC Report	Winter 16', 63', 77'; Aitken 70'	Attendance: 551; Referee: Robertson

1 December 2012 Scottish Cup round 4	Stranraer	0 – 5	Dundee United	Stair Park
15:00		BBC Report	Russell 13', 27', 69'; Daly 40', 61'	Attendance: 1,089; Referee: Finnie

== Player statistics ==
=== Squad ===
Last updated 12 May 2013

No.	Pos	Nat	Player	Total		Second Division		Challenge Cup		League Cup		Scottish Cup	
No.	Pos	Nat	Player	Apps	Goals	Apps	Goals	Apps	Goals	Apps	Goals	Apps	Goals
	GK	(Scotland) SCO	Russell Cadwell	3	0	1+2	0	0+0	0	0+0	0	0+0	0
	GK	(Scotland) SCO	Ryan Marshall	0	0	0+0	0	0+0	0	0+0	0	0+0	0
	GK	(Scotland) SCO	David Mitchell	37	0	32+0	0	1+0	0	1+0	0	3+0	0
	GK	(Scotland) SCO	Colin Stewart	3	0	3+0	0	0+0	0	0+0	0	0+0	0
	DF	(France) FRA	Zakaria Belkouche	0	0	0+0	0	0+0	0	0+0	0	0+0	0
	DF	(Scotland) SCO	Mick Dunlop	40	1	35+0	1	1+0	0	1+0	0	3+0	0
	DF	(Scotland) SCO	Grant Gallagher	41	1	36+0	1	1+0	0	1+0	0	3+0	0
	DF	(Scotland) SCO	Lloyd Kinnaird	32	0	25+4	0	1+0	0	1+0	0	1+0	0
	DF	(Scotland) SCO	David McGregor	17	0	13+1	0	0+0	0	0+0	0	2+1	0
	DF	(Scotland) SCO	Frank McKeown	41	2	36+0	2	1+0	0	1+0	0	3+0	0
	DF	(Scotland) SCO	Mark Staunton	35	0	29+1	0	1+0	0	1+0	0	3+0	0
	MF	(Scotland) SCO	Dean Agnew	13	0	2+8	0	0+0	0	0+1	0	0+2	0
	MF	(Scotland) SCO	Chris Aitken	38	6	33+0	5	1+0	0	1+0	0	2+1	1
	MF	(Scotland) SCO	Ryan Boris	33	3	25+6	3	1+0	0	1+0	0	0+0	0
	MF	(Scotland) SCO	Jamie Campbell	10	0	2+8	0	0+0	0	0+0	0	0+0	0
	MF	(Scotland) SCO	Adam Forde	4	0	0+3	0	0+0	0	0+1	0	0+0	0
	MF	(Scotland) SCO	Nick Phinn	7	0	4+2	0	0+0	0	0+0	0	1+0	0
	MF	(Scotland) SCO	Kyle Rafferty	1	0	0+0	0	0+0	0	0+0	0	0+1	0
	MF	(Scotland) SCO	Sean Winter	39	5	32+2	1	1+0	1	1+0	0	3+0	3
	MF	(Scotland) SCO	Kieren Wood	2	0	0+2	0	0+0	0	0+0	0	0+0	0
	FW	(Scotland) SCO	Blair Dougan	0	0	0+0	0	0+0	0	0+0	0	0+0	0
	FW	(Scotland) SCO	Darren Gribben	15	4	12+3	4	0+0	0	0+0	0	0+0	0
	FW	(Scotland) SCO	Robert Love	39	4	19+15	4	1+0	0	1+0	0	2+1	0
	FW	(Scotland) SCO	Craig Malcolm	41	19	36+0	18	1+0	0	1+0	0	3+0	1
	FW	(Scotland) SCO	Michael Moore	34	2	13+16	2	0+1	0	0+1	0	3+0	0
	FW	(France) FRA	Armand Oné	17	1	6+10	1	0+0	0	0+0	0	0+1	0
	DF	(Scotland) SCO	Max Wright	14	0	2+10	0	0+0	0	0+0	0	1+1	0

=== Disciplinary record ===
Includes all competitive matches.

Last updated 12 May 2013

Nation	Position	Name	Second Division		Challenge Cup		League Cup		Scottish Cup		Total	
Nation	Position	Name	Booked	Sent off (straight red)	Booked	Sent off (straight red)	Booked	Sent off (straight red)	Booked	Sent off (straight red)	Booked	Sent off (straight red)
(Scotland)	GK	Russell Cadwell	0	0	0	0	0	0	0	0	0	0
(Scotland)	GK	Ryan Marshall	0	0	0	0	0	0	0	0	0	0
(Scotland)	GK	David Mitchell	0	2	0	0	0	0	0	0	0	2
(Scotland)	GK	Colin Stewart	0	0	0	0	0	0	0	0	0	0
(France)	DF	Zakaria Belkouche	0	0	0	0	0	0	0	0	0	0
(Scotland)	DF	Mick Dunlop	4	0	0	0	0	0	0	0	4	0
(Scotland)	DF	Grant Gallagher	3	0	1	0	0	0	0	0	4	0
(Scotland)	DF	Lloyd Kinnaird	3	0	0	0	0	0	1	0	4	0
(Scotland)	DF	David McGregor	5	0	0	0	0	0	1	0	6	0
(Scotland)	DF	Frank McKeown	5	0	0	0	0	0	0	0	5	0
(Scotland)	DF	Mark Staunton	7	0	0	0	1	0	1	0	9	0
(Scotland)	MF	Dean Agnew	0	0	0	0	0	0	0	0	0	0
(Scotland)	MF	Chris Aitken	4	1	0	0	0	0	0	0	4	1
(Scotland)	MF	Ryan Boris	6	0	0	0	0	0	0	0	6	0
(Scotland)	MF	Jamie Campbell	0	0	0	0	0	0	0	0	0	0
(Scotland)	MF	Adam Forde	0	0	0	0	0	0	0	0	0	0
(Scotland)	MF	Nick Phinn	1	0	0	0	0	0	0	0	1	0
(Scotland)	MF	Kyle Rafferty	0	0	0	0	0	0	0	0	0	0
(Scotland)	MF	Sean Winter	1	0	0	0	0	0	1	0	2	0
(Scotland)	MF	Kieren Wood	0	0	0	0	0	0	0	0	0	0
(Scotland)	FW	Blair Dougan	0	0	0	0	0	0	0	0	0	0
(Scotland)	FW	Darren Gribben	0	0	0	0	0	0	0	0	0	0
(Scotland)	FW	Robert Love	6	0	1	0	0	0	0	0	7	0
(Scotland)	FW	Craig Malcolm	4	0	0	0	0	0	1	0	5	0
(Scotland)	FW	Michael Moore	4	0	0	0	0	0	0	0	4	0
(France)	FW	Armand Oné	1	0	0	0	0	0	0	0	1	0
(Scotland)	FW	Max Wright	0	0	0	0	0	0	0	0	0	0

== Team statistics ==
=== League table ===
Pos	Team	Pld	W	D	L	GF	GA	GD	Pts	Promotion, qualification or relegation
6	Stenhousemuir	36	12	13	11	59	59	0	49	
7	Ayr United	36	12	5	19	53	65	−12	41	
8	Stranraer	36	10	7	19	43	71	−28	37	
9	East Fife (O)	36	8	8	20	50	65	−15	32	Qualification for the Second Division play-offs
10	Albion Rovers (R)	36	7	3	26	45	82	−37	24	Relegation to the League Two

Source: SPFL Archive
Rules for classification: 1) points; 2) goal difference; 3) number of goals scored.
(O) Play-off winners; (R) Relegated

=== Division summary ===
Round	1	2	3	4	5	6	7	8	9	10	11	12	13	14	15	16	17	18	19	20	21	22	23	24	25	26	27	28	29	30	31	32	33	34	35	36
Ground	H	A	H	H	A	A	H	H	A	H	A	A	H	H	A	A	H	A	A	A	A	H	H	H	H	A	H	A	H	H	A	A	A	A	H	A
Result	D	L	D	W	L	L	L	L	L	W	L	L	D	W	W	L	L	W	L	D	L	W	L	W	D	L	W	L	L	W	D	L	L	D	L	W
Position	8	9	8	7	8	8	10	10	10	10	10	10	10	9	9	9	9	9	9	9	9	9	9	9	9	9	8	8	8	8	8	8	8	8	8	8

Updated to match(es) played on 12 May 2013. Source:
A = Away; H = Home; W = Win; D = Draw; L = Loss

== Transfers ==
=== Players in ===
Player	To	Fee
(Scotland) Robert Love	(Scotland) Albion Rovers	Free
(Scotland) Ryan Borris	(Scotland) Dumbarton	Free
(Scotland) Mick Dunlop	(Scotland) Brechin City	Free
(Scotland) Mark Staunton	(Scotland) Beith Juniors	Free
(Scotland) Russell Cadwell	(Scotland) Kilmarnock	Free
(Scotland) Max Wright	(Scotland) Alloa Athletic	Free
(Scotland) Nick Phinn	(Scotland) Dunfermline Athletic	Free
(France) Armand One	Free agent	Free
(Scotland) Jamie Campbell	(Scotland) Partick Thistle	Loan
(Scotland) Darren Gribben	(Scotland) Arbroath	Free

=== Players out ===
Player	To	Fee
(Scotland) Stuart McColm	(Scotland) Clyde	Free
(Scotland) John Kane	(Scotland) Clyde	Free
(Scotland) Nathan Shepherd	(Scotland) East Stirlingshire	Free
(Scotland) Angus Cochrane	Free agent	Free
(Scotland) Stephen Stirling	(Scotland) Greenock Morton	Free
(Scotland) Steven Noble	(Scotland) Peterhead	Free
(Scotland) Martin Grehan	(Scotland) Alloa Athletic	Free
(Scotland) Max Wright	(Scotland) East Stirlingshire	Free
