= Cincinnati Ballet =

American ballet company

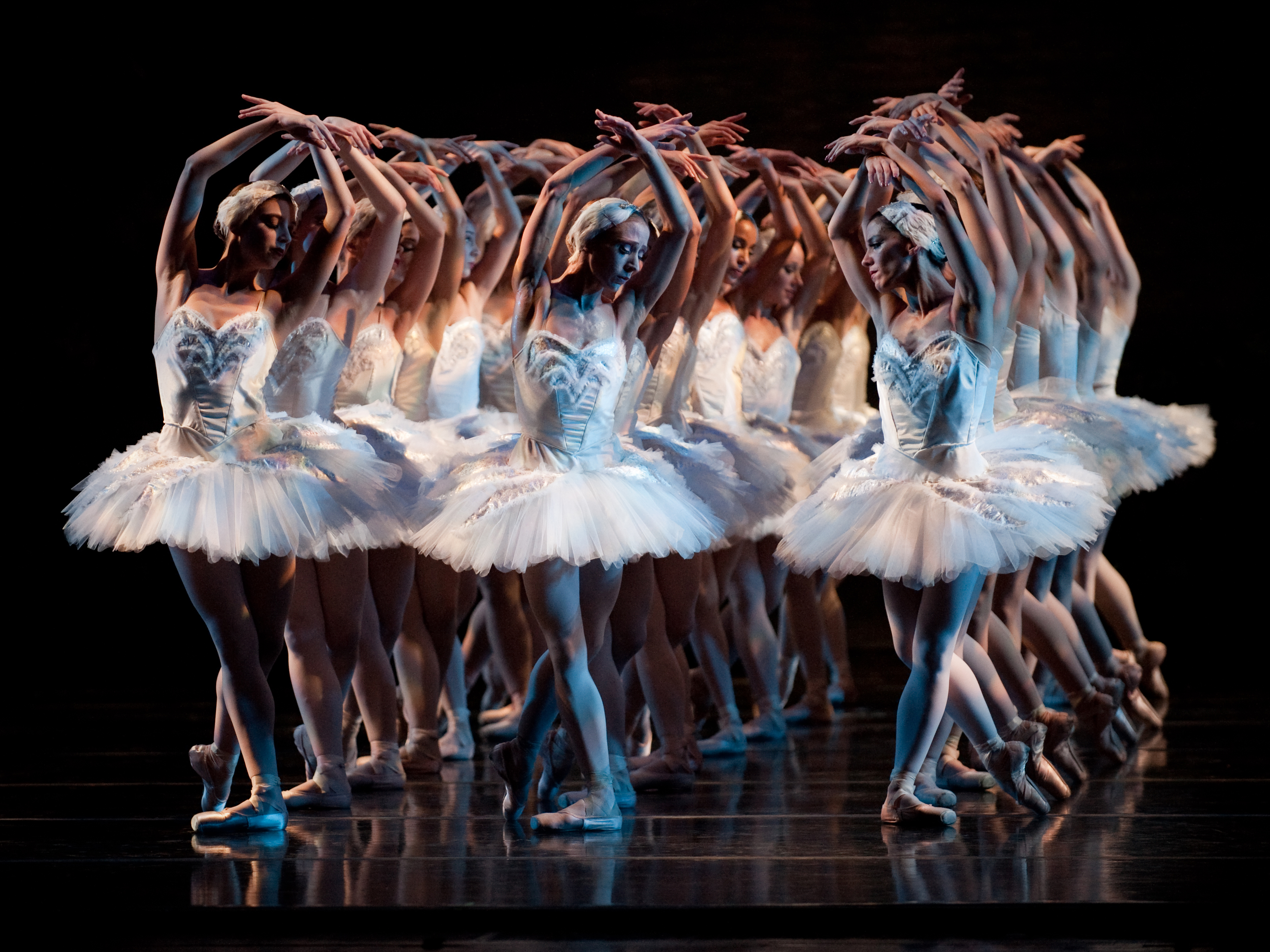
- Swan Lake
- Formation: 1958; First performance: 1964
- Type: Non-profit
- Legal status: Foundation
- Headquarters: 1801 Gilbert Avenue
- Location: Cincinnati, Ohio
- Website: Cincinnati Ballet

The Cincinnati Ballet is a professional ballet company founded as Cincinnati Civic Ballet in 1958, based in Cincinnati, Ohio, United States. After being registered as a company, it had its first performance in 1964.

== Founding ==
Organizing founders Nancy Bauer, Virginia Garrett, and Myrl Laurence first chartered the company as the “Cincinnati Civic Ballet” in 1958. Then in 1962, seven ballet teachers in the Cincinnati area, including Anneliese von Oettingen, Shirley Frame Elmore, Mac Vestal came together to officially form the company. The first official auditions were in 1963 at the YMCA where 41 dancers were chosen from the 200 audition hopefuls. Debut performances took place at the University of Cincinnati’s Wilson Auditorium in 1964 and 1965. The first performance included an original ballet by guest choreographer Joseph Levinoff, Chopin Piano Concerto in F Minor. The repertoire consisted of ballets choreographed or staged by Oleg Sabline, Tania Karina, William Dollar, and John Taras.

Oleg Sabline, a European-trained dancer whose career had taken him through Europe and the United States, was appointed director for the first performances. He originally came to Cincinnati to teach ballet and stage the classics at The University of Cincinnati – College-Conservatory of Music (CCM).

== Early history ==
In 1966, the directorship passed on to David McLain. He also headed the Dance Division of CCM. CCM gave the young company the advantages of studio space for classes and rehearsals, access to talented students, and the use of the Wilson Auditorium for performances. The dancers in the company also had to pay a fee of $10.00 per year to be a part of the company. As the organization outgrew the profile of a non-professional civic company, the company was re-named “Cincinnati Ballet Company” in 1968 and gained Carmon DeLeone as music director.

By 1970, professional status was achieved when ten salaried dancers were hired. CCM faculty member James Truitte began to train dancers in the contemporary technique created by the American choreographer Lester Horton. As the company dancers became proficient in Horton technique, they began to perform Horton's choreography. As a result, Cincinnati Ballet Company earned national recognition for keeping this historic work alive.

However, by the mid-1970s, CBC was still first and foremost a ballet company with classical works in the repertoire, including Les Patineurs, Pas de Quatre and variations from The Sleeping Beauty, along with two Balanchine ballets, Concerto Barocco and Serenade. Performances took place at the Taft Theatre and tours were added in Kentucky, Ohio, South Carolina, Puerto Rico, the Virgin Islands, Jacob's Pillow and at New York City's Dance Festival in 1975.

The Nutcracker was premiered in 1974 at Music Hall. Frisch's Restaurants from Cincinnati sponsored the performances and have continued to do so. Today Frisch’s presents: The Nutcracker is a Cincinnati tradition.

The Nutcracker was choreographed by Moscelyne Larkin, Roman Jasinski and Frederic Franklin. This led to Franklin's long tenure as Resident Choreographer and the period of his being Interim Director.

Beginning in 1978, regular repertoire performances were also held at Music Hall, and the schedule expanded from three series to five by 1980. The company's name was shortened to “Cincinnati Ballet”, and in 1983 a sister-city arrangement begun with New Orleans to further increase performing opportunities.

McLain died in 1984 and Frederic Franklin became interim director. A permanent artistic director, Ivan Nagy, was appointed in 1986. The company moved out of CCM, although it was still designated the official school. It was Nagy's intention to have Cincinnati Ballet stand alone as a professional company. The company continued to perform at Music Hall but rehearsals were now in the Emery Building. A Hungarian native who had danced all over the world, Nagy knew many foreign dancers, and brought a number of them to Cincinnati. The arrival of highly experienced dancers began to raise the company to a new standard of performance. The company expanded to include five principals, nine soloists and twenty-three corps members. It joined the American Guild of Musical Artists and added the SCPA Dance Department, along with the CCM Children's Dance Division, as “feeder” institutions to provide apprentices and child performers.

A new Nutcracker, choreographed by Ben Stevenson of the Houston Ballet, was also performed every year in Knoxville as part of another sister-city arrangement. Repertoire included a full-length La Sylphide and Balanchine's Four Temperaments as well as pieces by contemporary choreographers such as Andre Prokovsky, Mauricio Wainrot, and Ronald Hynd.

Nagy left in 1989 and three artistic directors came and went in quick succession. Richard Collins was the first. A British-trained dancer, and a director of promise, he was killed in a car accident. Nigel Burgoine succeeded him in 1992 and Peter Anastos in 1994. During his two years in Cincinnati, Anastos created the very successful ballet Peter Pan with an original score by DeLeone. The ballet (now with the 2001 choreography by Septime Webre) was last performed in 2018, which also marked DeLeone's 50th anniversary with Cincinnati Ballet.

== Later history ==
Through the Kaplan Foundation and the Budig Foundation, a new permanent home was built for the company. The Cincinnati Ballet Center on Central Parkway at Liberty Street opened in 1994. The Otto M. Budig Academy of Cincinnati Ballet was launched in 1996. Offices, dance studios, a training school, wardrobe/costume storage, and rehearsal space were all in the same complex. The intimate Mickey Jarson Kaplan Performance Studio was added in 2005.

The Aronoff Center for the Arts became the permanent home for the repertoire series of performances and a number of ballets were acquired. “Americana” ballets such as Agnes DeMille’s Rodeo, and modern dance pieces by Paul Taylor challenged the dancers and intrigued audiences. In 1996, Balanchine's full-length Jewels, was performed by the company. Other contemporary choreographers included Kirk Peterson, Kathryn Posin, Stanton Welch and Val Caniparoli, Trey McIntyre in addition to Nigel Burgoine and Victoria Morgan, who was appointed artistic director in 1997.

Artistic Director and CEO Morgan, honored the Cincinnati Ballet tradition of performing not only new works, but also keeping the historic repertoire alive. An example was the tribute to Frederic Franklin and the Ballet Russe de Monte-Carlo in 2002. The ballets presented were Devil’s Holiday by Frederick Ashton, plus the third movement of Seventh Symphony (music by Beethoven), and Gaîte Parisienne, choreographed by Leonide Massine.

Franklin restaged the two remaining extant movements from Seventh Symphony two seasons later, aided by Cincinnati Ballet's Principal Ballet Mistress and former Cincinnati Ballet soloist dancer Johanna Bernstein Wilt, who researched and recreated all three Seventh Symphony movements from the original 16 mm film with coaching from Franklin.

Also of note were three collaborations between Cincinnati Ballet and BalletMet Columbus. Together the companies presented Balanchine's Jewels (2003), Stars and Stripes (2006) and a full-length production of Swan Lake (2009).

In 2008 Devon Carney, a former principal dancer and Ballet Master with Boston Ballet, was appointed as Associate Artistic Director. In addition to providing his own choreography for nine pieces, Carney has restaged and added fresh choreography to full-length classics such as Giselle, Sleeping Beauty, and Swan Lake to this date and during his five previous years as Ballet Master-in-Chief.

During the 2007–2008 season, Morgan negotiated a performing partnership with The Suzanne Farrell Ballet, which resulted in the presentation of a joint program both at The Aronoff Center and Washington, D.C.’s Kennedy Center in 2008.

The 2013-2014 season marked the 50th anniversary of Cincinnati Ballet. In May 2014, as a part of Cincinnati Ballet's 50th-anniversary celebration, they performed at the prestigious Joyce Theater in New York City. In 2014, Cincinnati Ballet danced the world premiere of Victoria Morgan's King Arthur’s Camelot with a score composed by John Estacio.

In February of 2020, it was announced that lead principal dancer Cervilio Amador would retire and assume the position of Ballet Master. In March 2024 the Cincinnati Ballet Board of Trustees appointed Deborah S. Brant President and CEO of Cincinnati Ballet, she had served as interim president and CEO after assuming the role on an interim basis from Scott Altman in January 2024. In December 2024, Cincinnati Ballet's Board of Trustees announced former principal dancer Cervilio Amador was named permanent artistic director of Cincinnati Ballet, after being appointed as the interim artistic director in September 2023.

== Performers ==
Cincinnati Ballet is made up of dancers from all over the United States and the world. They perform at Cincinnati Music Hall, The Aronoff Center and tour American cities, as well as Europe.

== Dancers of note – earlier years through present times ==
Colleen Geisting, Karl Lindholm, Patrick Hinson, Richard Early, Peggy Lyman, Cynthia Ann Roses, Kimberly Smiley, Donna Grisez-Weber, Roman Jasinski, Sara Nieto, Diane Edwards, Melissa Hale, Patricia Rozow, Christina Foisie, Leisa Moran, Debra Kelly, Patricia Kelly, Margo Krody, Barbara McFarlane, Michael Sharp, Thomas Morris, Ian Barrett, Kevin Ward, Charles Flachs, Rose Marie Wurzer, Suzette Boyer, Philip Rosemond, Meridith Benson, Claudia Rudolf, Carol Krajacic, Rebecca Rodriguez, Trinidad Vives, Marcello Angelini, Victoria Hall, Darren Anderson, Daniela Buson, René Micheo, Karyn Lee Connell, Alexei Kremnev, Anna Reznik, Kristi Capps, Cervilio Amador, Anthony Krutzkamp, Stephanie Crank, Janessa Touchet, Adiarys Almeida, Joseph Gatti and Dmitri Trubchanov. Karen Kuertz Travis, Jane Wagner Green, Katherine Ochoa.

=== Current dancers ===
2025-2026 Season:

==== Principal dancers ====
- Melissa Gelfin
- Sirui Liu
- Alejandro Olivera
- Rafael Quenedit

==== First soloists ====
- Philip Fedulov
- Rachele Pizzillo

==== Soloists ====
- Marcus Romeo

==== Corps de ballet ====
- Kana Arai
- Nikita Boris
- Nutsa Chekurashvili
- Llonnis Del Toro
- Thomas Dilley
- Joseph Dlearo
- Joshua Fisk
- Kirsten Hunsberger
- Tatiana Melendez
- Simone Muhammad
- Amanda Pérez Duarte
- Simon Plant
- Hibiki Tsukamoto
- Bella Ureta

==== New Dancers ====
- Nasrullah Abdur-Rahman
- Annie Fitzpatrick
- Mia Schlosser
- Salomé Trege

==== Apprentices ====
- Soren Campagna
- Angelina de la Nuez
- Nicholas Motley
- Jenna Potvin

==== CBII: Cincinnati Ballet Second Company ====
- Charlie Baldwin
- Ciaran Barlow
- Lev Cornwall
- Ethan Guthrie
- Camilla Howard
- Miharu Kikuchi
- Isabelle Lapierre
- Zander Magolnick
- Ezra Mcphie
- Piper Panek
- Roxy Slavin
- Stella Stulik
- Antonio Villegas
