= Mark Staunton =

Scottish footballer

Personal information
- Full name: Mark Staunton
- Date of birth: 30 January 1989 (age 37)
- Place of birth: Alexandria, Scotland
- Positions: Defender; forward

Youth career
- Celtic

Senior career*
Years	Team	Apps	(Gls)
2006–2007	Charlton Athletic	43	(0)
2007–2009	Falkirk	25	(0)
2007–2008	→ Berwick Rangers (loan)	3	(0)
2009–2010	East Fife	11	(0)
2010–2012	Beith	29	(2)
2012–2013	Stranraer	0	(0)
2013–2015	Irvine Meadow XI F.C.		
2015	Stirling Albion	1	(0)

International career
2004–2005	Scotland U16	9	(0)
2005–2006	Scotland U17	5	(0)
- * Club domestic league appearances and goals as of 21:51, 18 August 2015 (UTC)

Mark Staunton (born 30 January 1989 in Alexandria) is a Scottish footballer who is currently without a club after leaving Stirling Albion in August 2015.

== Club career ==
Staunton began his career with Celtic, playing in the under-19 youth team. He left Celtic to join Charlton Athletic in July 2006, with the London club - who paid £110,000 - having kept tabs on him for nearly a year previously. Staunton left Charlton to join Falkirk in August 2007 but was sent to Berwick Rangers on loan for the rest of the season in December 2007, with Falkirk manager John Hughes admitting he was "concerned about his lack of games." Mark was released by Falkirk on 27 June 2009.

On 23 July 2009, Staunton joined Scottish Second Division side East Fife. He was released at the end of the 2009/10 season, when he moved to junior side Beith.

Staunton returned to senior football in the 2012 summer transfer window, when he signed for Stranraer.

On 21 June 2013, Staunton returned to junior football, signing for Irvine Meadow XI F.C.

On 15 June 2015, Staunton signed for Stirling Albion. After just two months at the club, on 18 August 2015, he left Stirling Albion after asking to be released from his contract.

== International career ==
Staunton has been an unused member of Scotland under-19 squad, previously playing at national under-16 and under-17 level.
