= Spencer Trethewy =

English football manager and property developer

Spencer Day
Personal information
- Date of birth: 23 December 1971 (age 54)
- Place of birth: England

Team information
- Current team: Farnborough (manager)

Managerial career
- Years: Team
- 2007–2011: Chertsey Town
- 2011–: Farnborough

Spencer Day, also known as Spencer Trethewy, is an English businessman and football manager who is manager of National League South club Farnborough.

Day first attracted national attention in 1990 during Aldershot's financial crisis and has since managed non-league clubs including Chertsey Town and Farnborough.

== Football management ==
In 2007 Trethewy, having changed his name to Spencer Day in 1998 taking his mother's maiden name became owner and manager of Chertsey Town. Since 2011 Day has been manager of Farnborough. In 2013, the club entered administration, with debts of around two million pounds with Day being owed around £1m himself from loans to the club.

== Business interests ==
Day is reported by The Non-League Paper to have built a substantial company finance investment business holding (managing partner of HH Finance) in the last fifteen years which specializes in residential and commercial holdings worldwide. HH own significant waterfront holdings in Kingston upon Thames according to the Land Registry. Day is known to own at least two superyachts, helicopters, and homes throughout the world. One of his main residences was featured in the Sunday Times "Beyond the brochure" article (1 November 2009) and is listed at £12m. Day was listed as a creditor of the Connaught Income series Fund and operation partner Tuita in 2012 which entered liquidation.

== Legal proceedings ==
In 1994, Trethewy was convicted of breaching the Companies Act by running up bills when his airline company was suspended from trading and sentenced to twenty-five months in prison. This was reduced due to some successful appeals to eleven months.
