= Glenn Burvill =

English footballer

Personal information
- Full name: Glenn Burvill
- Date of birth: 26 October 1962 (age 64)
- Place of birth: Canning Town, London, England
- Height: 5 ft 9 in (1.75 m)
- Position: Midfielder

Youth career
- –1980: West Ham United

Senior career*
Years	Team	Apps	(Gls)
1980–1983	West Ham United	0	(0)
1983–1985	Aldershot	65	(15)
1985–1986	Reading	30	(0)
1985–1986	→ Fulham (loan)	9	(2)
1986–1991	Aldershot	195	(23)
1991–1996	Newhaven		
1996	Horsham	8	(0)
1996-1999	Saltdean United		
2001	Newhaven		
2001	Lewes	0	(0)
2001–2002	Whitehawk	10	(0)

Managerial career
- 1994–1996: Newhaven (joint)
- 1999–2001: Saltdean United
- 2001–2002: Whitehawk (joint)
- 2002-2003: Ringmer
- * Club domestic league appearances and goals

Glen Burvill (born 26 October 1962) is an English former footballer who played as a midfielder for Aldershot, Fulham and Reading in the Football League.

== Football career ==
=== Club career ===
Burvill started with West Ham United as an apprentice in their youth squad and was a member of the team which won the 1981 Youth Cup. Without making a first team appearance for West Ham before he moved to Aldershot in 1983. Burvill also played for Fulham and Reading before re-joining the Shots.

After leaving Aldershot, Burvill moved into non-league football with Newhaven, jointly managing the Dockers from 1994 to 1996 with Martin Langley, before joining Horsham as a player towards the end of the 1995–96 season.

Burvill signed for newly promoted Saltdean United in August 1996 taking over as manager for the start of the 1999–2000 season, which finished with them winning the John O'Hara Cup. Resigning in January 2001 after a poor run of results, Burvill rejoined Newhaven as a player and also appeared for Lewes in the Sussex Senior Cup semi-final, having joined the Rooks just days before as part of the management team. Burvill joined Whitehawk in the summer of 2001 as player-coach, before managing jointly with Ian Chapman for the rest of the season.

After Chapman took sole charge at the Hawks, Burvill was appointed manager of Ringmer in August 2002, succeeding Glen Geard, who resigned after most of the team departed prior to the start of the season.

Burvill resigned as Ringmer manager in November 1993.

== Honours ==
Reading

- Football League Third Division: 1985–86
