= Ivan Nagy (dancer) =

Hungarian ballet dancer and company director

- Ivan Nagy, circa 1980s
- Born: 28 April 1943; Debrecen, Hungary
- Died: 22 February 2014 (aged 70); Budapest, Hungary
- Occupation: Dancer
- Children: 2

Ivan Nagy (28 April 1943 – 22 February 2014) was a Hungarian ballet dancer.

He became one of American Ballet Theatre's most notable stars in the 1970s as a critically acclaimed partner to ballerinas.

== Biography ==
Nagy was born in Debrecen, Hungary on 28 April 1943. He was trained in Budapest by Soviet-influenced teachers before he defected to the United States in 1965. He was sent to the International Ballet Competition in Varna, Bulgaria, where he won a silver medal.

During a tour to London, Nagy met London Festival Ballet dancer Marilyn Burr, whom he later married. After seeking political asylum in the United States in 1966, he briefly performed with the Washington Ballet and the New York City Ballet before joining American Ballet Theatre, where he spent the next decade as a principal dancer. During his time with the company, Where he established partnerships with Natalia Makarova and Gelsey Kirkland, and also appeared with Margot Fonteyn on an Australian tour. Nagy retired from Ballet Theater at the age of 35. His decision was met with regret by several of his fellow dancers, including Makarova, who considered him one of her favorite stage partners.

After retiring from dancing, Nagy spent three years teaching and working as a consultant before becoming artistic director of Santiago Ballet in Chile in 1982. He remained with the company until 1986, when he was appointed artistic director of the Cincinnati Ballet. In 1990, he became artistic director of the English National Ballet, serving until 1993. After leaving the company, he briefly returned to Santiago Ballet. Later in his career, he coached dancers at the Budapest Opera, where he was working at the time of his death in 2014.

He lived with his wife in Valldemossa, on the island of Majorca. He did pay a visit to guest-teach at Gelsey Kirkland's School of Classical Ballet.

Nagy died on 22 February 2014 while visiting a cousin in Budapest. He was aged 70. He was survived by his wife, two daughters and a granddaughter.
