= Darren Anderson (dancer) =

Canadian ballet dancer and choreographer

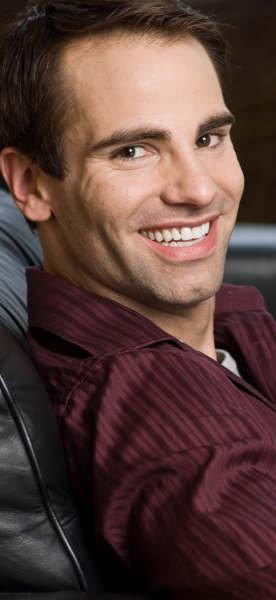
- Darren Anderson
- Born: Darren John Anderson; Edmonton, Alberta, Canada
- Occupations: Dancer, Choreographer, Innovator
- Known for: International Dance career with Royal Winnipeg Ballet, Cincinnati Ballet, & Smuin Ballet, and acclaimed guest artist for multiple companies

Darren John Anderson (born in Edmonton, Alberta) is an internationally acclaimed ballet dancer. He is also known for his work in contemporary and classical choreography.

== Life and career ==
Darren Anderson was born to Gerald Hubert Anderson, a Master Warrant Officer from the Royal Canadian Armed Forces, and Jean Elizabeth Anderson, a gemologist, in Edmonton, Alberta. While growing up, Anderson describes his early exposure as being to hockey, which his family encouraged him to pursue, to follow in the steps of his uncle Norm Ullman, a hockey star who had been inducted into the Hockey Hall of Fame. But Anderson was not interested in hockey; instead he began studying ballet at age 18 at the Alberta Ballet School, and he described himself as immediately "hooked".

At age 19, Anderson was accepted into the National Ballet of Canada and the Royal Winnipeg Ballet summer programs and was given a scholarship to attend the Royal Winnipeg Ballet, where he won a spot in the school's professional division. He completed the program in 1998 and danced with the company as an Aspirant for one season while continuing his training through private coaching with Dr. Arnold Spohr. In 1999 he joined the Cincinnati Ballet, where he remained for three seasons. He also studied at the American Ballet Theatre's Summer Intensive in New York City.

Anderson returned to Canada to join the Royal Winnipeg Ballet in 2002, where he was Second Soloist with the company, and performed such roles as Uncle Drosselmeyer in "The Nutcracker", the cat in "Puss in Boots", and the dog in "Val Caniparoli's Cinderella". In the latter production, he played Carabosse, the wicked witch role that required him to dress in drag. He had a dominant stage presence infused with his theatrical and comedic abilities, which commanded attention. Another significant part for him was as Cinderella's dog in "A Cinderella Story", which gave him the reputation of being adept at portraying characters such as mystical and animal roles. It also identified his talent for injecting his roles with a compelling edge that, beyond just the dancing itself, delighted audiences. "It was Darren Anderson, en travestie as the wicked Carabosse, who almost stole the show." Anderson was also known for his physicality, which proved pivotal in his roles, and his finesse in transitioning from classical works to contemporary works within a single season. "An exception to the company's general constraint in attack was Darren Anderson's Puss in Boots. Though also coulourlessly costumed, he danced with abandon within his character." He gained wide respect for community outreach to increase interest in ballet across generations and to expose children to dance at an early age.

Anderson's advanced ballet training, which was exclusively classical, included the Russian Vaganova method, the English Royal Academy of Dance, and the George Balanchine method. He danced with Banff Festival Ballet (Summer company), Royal Winnipeg Ballet, Cincinnati Ballet, Smuin Ballet, and danced in guest performances in Canada, the United States, Japan, and Europe. His principal dance teachers were: Arnold Spohr, Ross Brierton, Arlene Minkhorst, and Willie Burman.

Over his career, Anderson danced in a wide variety of works by such noted choreographers as George Balanchine, Agnes De Mille, Rudi van Dantzig, Jiri Kylian, John Neumeier, John Cranko, Val Caniparoli, Michael Smuin, Stanton Welch and Itzik Galili. He was most identified in the following roles: "Dog" in Val Caniparoli's "A Cinderella Story", "Carabosse" in The Sleeping Beauty, soloist in Stanton Welch's "Fingerprints", Petite Mort (Kylian), "Sugar Plum Cavalier", Uncle Drosselmeyer in "The Nutcracker", "Snow Cavalier", "Spanish", and "Rat King", in "The Nutcracker", "Romeo and Juliet" balcony scene, "Dr. Van Helsing" in Dracula, "Le Jazz Hot" pas de deux, "SYNC" (Nils Christie).

In August, 2008, Anderson joined Smuin Ballet, a company founded by Emmy Award- and Tony Award-winning choreographer Michael Smuin, who had previously served as the co-director of the San Francisco Ballet. In Anderson's five-year dance tenure with the company, he performed solos in such works as Petite Mort, "French Twist", "Dancin' with Gershwin", "Dances With Songs", and "Fly Me to the Moon". He performed his final program with Smuin in May 2012, which included Val Caniparoli's "Swipe," Ma Cong's "Through" and Michael Smuin's "Symphony of Psalms".

In 2012, Anderson began work on new choreography for Smuin Ballet. His choreography, entitled "All I want for Christmas is You," for the Smuin annual holiday show, received accolades from the media. His choreographed works, "At Last" and "Kiss-Kiss" were highlighted in Smuin Ballet's annual gala evenings in 2015 and 2016, respectively. He was appointed to the newly created Community Relations Manager position for the company, where one of his focuses is community outreach and public relations. Anderson received accolades for his establishment of an LGBT Night event at Smuin Ballet.

In 2018, Darren Anderson launched a K-12 education initiative called "Dancentive" aimed at incorporating dance as part fitness and health for children.

== Personal ==
Darren Anderson lives in San Francisco, California.

== Choreography ==
- "The Culprit" (April 2009)
- "At Last" (Smuin Ballet, April 2012)
- "Shiver" (World Premiere: Smuin Ballet, April 2012)
- "All I Want for Christmas" (Smuin Ballet, November 2012)
- "Four Smuin Ballet Promotional Video Ads" (October 2013)
- "Kiss-Kiss" (Smuin Ballet Workshop, February 2014)
- "Syzygy" (Smuin Ballet Workshop, March 2015)
- "At Last" (Smuin Ballet Gala, 2015)
- "Kiss-Kiss" (Smuin Ballet Gala, 2016)
- "Lightness" (Lighthouse Family of Schools Gala, 2017)

== Film and television ==
- Falcon Beach (Television Series)
- Nude Caboose - 2006 - Actor (Director Guy Maddin)
- Ballet Girls documentary with Royal Winnipeg Ballet (2006)
- Capote (starring Philip Seymour Hoffman) - 2005 - Film - Featured Extra
- Around Sanford - 2004 - Lead Actor (Independent film)
- The Winnipeg Season - 2004 - Television movie, special skills extra (dance)
- Shall We Dance? (Richard Gere, Jennifer Lopez)- 2004 - special skills extra actor (dance)
- Cincinnati POPS Thanksgiving Special (1999)

== Honors and awards ==
- Bay Area Choreographer of the Month (June, 2012)
- Dr. Arnold Spohr Award of Excellence (1997-1998)
- Dr. Francis G. Winspear Award for Excellence (1997-1998)
- Alberta Foundation for the Arts Grant (1997)
- Alberta Foundation for the Arts Grant (1998)
- American Ballet Theatre Scholarship (Summer Intensive 2000)
- Manitoba Arts Council Travel Grant for Professional Development Travel in Japan (2007)
