= Farnborough F.C. =

English football club

Farnborough
- Full name: Farnborough Football Club
- Nicknames: Boro, The Yellows
- Founded: 1967
- Ground: Cherrywood Road, Farnborough
- Capacity: 6,500
- Chairman: Simon Gardener
- Manager: Spencer Day
- League: National League South
- 2025–26: National League South, 19th of 24
- Website: farnboroughfc.co.uk
Home colours	Away colours

Farnborough Football Club is a semi-professional football club based in Farnborough, Hampshire, England. Founded in 1967 as Farnborough Town, they are currently members of the National League South, the sixth tier of English football and play at Cherrywood Road.

== History ==
The club was established as Farnborough Town in 1967 and joined the Surrey Senior League in 1968. Their first league match saw them beat Surbiton Byron 7–6. In 1971 they reached the top division of the Surrey Senior League, and after finishing as runners-up in 1971–72, they moved up to the Spartan League. They went on to win three consecutive league titles, losing only one league match during each of the 1973–74 and 1974–75 seasons. When the league merged with the Metropolitan–London League to form the London Spartan League in 1975, the club were placed in Division One, and were its first champions.

Following their move to Cherrywood Road, Farnborough moved up to Division Two of the Athenian League in 1976. They won the division at the first attempt, and were subsequently accepted into Division Two of the Isthmian League. During their domination of the Spartan and Athenian league divisions, the club went 87 matches unbeaten at home between 1973 and 1977. In 1978–79 they won Division Two of the Isthmian League, earning promotion to Division One. The 1980–81 season saw them reach the first round of the FA Cup for the first time, losing 2–1 at Yeovil Town. Another first round appearance in 1983–84 ended with a 2–1 defeat at Barking. They reached the first round again the following season and faced Football League opposition for the first time, losing 3–0 at Hereford United. The season also saw them win the Division One title, resulting in promotion to the Premier Division. They were Premier Division runners-up behind Leytonstone/Ilford in 1988–89 and were promoted to the Football Conference as Leytonstone/Ilford were unable to be promoted due to their ground failing to meet the necessary criteria.

Farnborough were relegated at the end of their first season in the Conference and were placed in the Premier Division of the Southern League. They won the division at the first attempt to earn promotion back to the Conference. After reaching the first round of the FA Cup in all but one of the seasons between 1983–84 and 1990–91, the club progressed beyond the first round for the first time in 1991–92; after a first round replay win over Halesowen Town, they defeated Third Division Torquay United 4–3 in a second round replay. They were drawn at home to top division West Ham. With the game switched to the Boleyn Ground, they held West Ham to a 1–1 draw before losing the replay 1–0. The season also saw them finish fifth in the Conference, but they were relegated back to the Southern League at the end of the following season.

Farnborough were Southern League champions again in 1993–94, making an immediate return to the Conference. The club spent five seasons in the Conference until being relegated at the end of the 1998–99 season, which had seen them finish bottom of the table. They were placed in the Premier Division of the Isthmian League, which they went on to win in 2000–01, resulting in promotion back to the Conference. In 2002–03 the club progressed beyond the first round of the FA Cup for a second time; after a 5–1 win against Harrogate Town in the first round, they defeated Southport 3–0 in the second round and Third Division Darlington 3–2 in the third round. They were then drawn at home to Arsenal in the fourth round, although the game was switched to Highbury. Following a 5–1 defeat, manager Graham Westley left the club, also taking seven players with him as he moved to Stevenage Borough. Farnborough remained in the Conference (and its new top division the Conference National) until the end of the 2004–05 season, when they were relegated to the Conference South. A third-place finish in 2005–06 saw them qualify for the promotion play-offs, but they lost 3–0 to Histon in the semi-finals.

In 2006–07 Farnborough went into administration and were deducted ten points. In May 2007 the club was expelled from the Football Conference and were reformed as Farnborough Football Club. They were admitted to Division One South & West of the Southern League, which they went on to win at the first attempt, earning promotion to the Premier Division. In 2008–09 they were Premier Division runners-up, qualifying for the promotion play-offs. After beating Hemel Hempstead Town 4–3 on penalties after a 0–0 draw in the semi-finals, they lost 1–0 to Gloucester City in the final. The following season saw them win the Premier Division, earning promotion to the Conference South. They were runners-up in their first season in the division and entered the promotion play-offs. After a 2–1 aggregate win over local rivals Woking in the semi-finals (winning 1–0 away and drawing 1–1 at home), they lost the final 4–2 to Ebbsfleet United.

Farnborough then began to suffer financial problems. In 2011–12 they were deducted five points after submitting misleading financial information to the Football Conference, and had ten points deducted the following season after going into administration again. They were relegated to the Premier Division of the Isthmian League at the end of the 2014–15 season and were subsequently demoted to Division One Central of the Southern League at the end of the 2015–16 season despite not finishing in the relegation zone due to their financial situation. They were Division One Central runners-up the following season; in the subsequent play-offs they defeated Egham Town 4–0 in the semi-finals before beating Barton Rovers 2–0 in the final to earn promotion back to the Premier Division of the Southern League. League reorganisation saw the club placed in the Southern League Premier South Division in 2018. After finishing third in 2021–22, they defeated Metropolitan Police in the play-off semi-final, before beating Hayes & Yeading United 2–1 in the final to secure promotion to the National League South. In 2022–23 the club defeated League Two side Sutton United 2–0 in the first round of the FA Cup, before losing 4–1 to Wrexham in the second.

== Ground ==
The club initially played on a council pitch at the Queen's Road recreation ground. However, to progress in the non-League pyramid the club had to find a ground that could be enclosed. A site on Cherrywood Road was obtained and developed with support from a local company.

== Current squad ==
As of 21 November 2026

Note: Flags indicate national team as defined under FIFA eligibility rules; some limited exceptions apply. Players may hold more than one non-FIFA nationality.

No.	Pos.	Nation	Player
1	GK	UGA	Giosue Bellagambi
2	DF	ENG	Sam Okoye
4	MF	ENG	Tom Lapslie
5	DF	ENG	Ollie Robinson (captain)
6	DF	GER	Max Ehmer
7	MF	ENG	Sam Barratt
8	MF	IRL	Josh Keeya
10	FW	WAL	Ollie Dewsbury (on loan from Bristol Rovers)
11	MF	ENG	Tyler Frost
12	FW	ENG	Dajon Golding
13	GK	ENG	Liam Hall
14	MF	ENG	Jackson Blaize (dual-registered with Bracknell Town)
15	DF	SKN	Andre Burley

No.	Pos.	Nation	Player
16	MF	AUT	Renny Smith
17	GK	ENG	Alex Walder
19	MF	ENG	Goran Babić
20	FW	ENG	Tate Xavier-Jones (on loan from Luton Town)
21	MF	SOM	Anis Nuur
22	DF	ENG	Ryan Jackson
23	FW	ANT	Josh Parker
24	MF	ENG	Kasway Burton (on loan from Oxford United)
25	FW	SCO	Josh Bayliss (on loan from Sheffield Wednesday)
26	FW	ENG	Mason Bloomfield
32	DF	ENG	Jaden Warner
33	DF	ENG	Kasim Aidoo

== Management team ==
Position	Staff
Manager	Spencer Day
Coach	Anthony Millerick
Coach	Neil Woodyer
Coach	Nick Meads
Goalkeeper Coach	Toby Colwell
Head Therapist	Holly Vickers
Therapist	Steve Girdler-Whitcombe
Sports Therapist	Ciara Blackman
Kit Manager	Louie Prince

Source: Farnborough FC

== Honours ==
- Isthmian League
  - Premier Division champions 2000–01
  - Division One champions 1984–85
  - Division Two champions 1978–79
- Southern League
  - Premier Division champions 1990–91, 1993–94, 2009–10
  - Division One South & West champions 2007–08
- Athenian League
  - Division Two champions 1976–77
- London Spartan League
  - Champions 1975–76
- Spartan League
  - Champions 1972–73, 1973–74, 1974–75
- Hampshire Senior Cup
  - Winners 1974–75, 1981–82, 1983–84, 1985–86, 1990–91, 2003–04, 2005–06, 2021–22

== Records ==
- Highest league finish: 5th in the Football Conference, 1991–92
- Best FA Cup performance: Fourth round, 2002–03
- Best FA Trophy performance: Quarter-finals, 1991–92, 2002–03
- Best FA Vase performance: Semi-finals, 1975–76, 1976–77
- Record attendance: 4,267 vs Ebbsfleet United, Conference South play-off final, 15 May 2011

== See also ==
- Farnborough F.C. players
- Farnborough F.C. managers
