= Darren Anderson (footballer) =

English footballer (born 1966)

Personal information
- Full name: Darren Irwin Anderson
- Date of birth: 6 September 1966 (age 60)
- Place of birth: Merton, England
- Height: 6 ft 1 in (1.85 m)
- Position: Central defender

Youth career
- Coventry City

Senior career*
| Years | Team | Apps | (Gls) |
| 1983–1986 | Charlton Athletic | 10 | (1) |
| 1985–1986 | → Crewe Alexandra (loan) | 5 | (0) |
| 1986–1990 | Aldershot | 98 | (4) |
| 1990–1993 | Slough Town | 137 | (16) |
| 1993–? | Sutton United | ? | (?) |
| Total | | 113 | (5) |

International career
| 1983–1984 | England U17 | 11 | (3) |
| 1984 | England Youth | 2 | (0) |
- * Club domestic league appearances and goals as of 12:53, 12 August 2010 (UTC)

Darren Irwin Anderson (born 6 September 1966) is an English former professional footballer who played as a central defender in the Football League. He represented England at youth level.

After a League career in which Anderson played for Charlton Athletic, Crewe Alexandra and Aldershot, he joined Conference side Slough Town, where he made 137 appearances and scored 16 goals. He left for Sutton United in September 1993.
