= Allan Gunn =

English football referee

Personal information
- Date of birth: 23 November 1943
- Place of birth: Brighton
- Date of death: 24 May 2004 (aged 60)
- Position: Forward

Senior career*
Years	Team	Apps	(Gls)
1960–1961	Old Varndeanians		
1961–1962	Whitehawk	31	(10)
1962–1963	Gravesend & Northfleet		
1963–1964	Whitehawk	31	(22)
1964–1965	Lewes		
1965–?	Newhaven		
- * Club domestic league appearances and goals

Allan Gunn (23 November 1943 – 2004) was an English football referee in the Football League, Premier League, and for FIFA. During his time on the List he was based in Sussex, initially Burgess Hill and later Chailey, near Lewes. Prior to refereeing he was a successful non-league footballer.

== Playing career ==
Gunn was a successful schoolboy footballer, appearing for Brighton Boys and Sussex. On leaving Varndean School he played as a left-winger for Old Varndeanians in the Sussex League, before moving to Whitehawk, winning County League Division 1 and the Sussex County Cup in 1962, as well as being chosen to represent Sussex.

Gunn tried a season as a part-time professional at Gravesend & Northfleet (now Ebbsfleet United) under former Brighton & Hove Albion manager Billy Lane, but then returned to win another Sussex County League title with Whitehawk in 1964. Gunn scored both goals against Lewes in the title decider at Whitehawk's Enclosed Ground on April 25, 1964. He then joined arch rivals Lewes, again winning the County League and Sussex County Cup, as well as the Sussex RUR Cup in 1965. After Lewes joined the amateur Athenian League, he switched to Newhaven and then concentrated on officiating, which he was encouraged to take up by the Sussex referee Frank Wood. He was a class 2 referee by the age of 24 in 1968.

== Refereeing career ==
Gunn became a Football League linesman in 1974 and two years later made the Supplementary Referees List. After a successful season at that level he was promoted to the full List in 1977.

Over the next few years he made frequent appearances in the then Football League Division One. In 1986, he was senior linesman to Alan Robinson in the FA Cup Final between Everton and Liverpool. He replaced the retiring Robinson on the FIFA list for the following season (1986–87).

He took charge of an increasing number of key domestic games. In 1987, he refereed the Associate Members' Cup Final between Mansfield and Bristol City. This was the first professional English Cup Final to be settled by a penalty shoot-out. Two years later, in April 1989, he handled the Final of the Full Members' Cup (a short-lived tournament for sides in the top two divisions) in which Nottingham Forest overcame Everton 4–3. He was appointed to the Charity Shield a few months later. Many referees who have handled this game have shortly after graduated to the FA Cup Final and he got his chance at the end of that season (1989–90). The Final between Manchester United and Crystal Palace ended 3–3 after extra time, and he also refereed the rather low-key replay, won by United 1–0.

On the international scene, he was referee for a number of club ties but his most notable match was a World Cup qualifier in April 1989 in which Portugal beat Switzerland 3–1.

Originally he was due to retire at the end of the 1990–91 season. However, in common with a number of high-performing referees at that time, he was granted an extension. This gave him a few more months at FIFA level before the world body reduced its own retirement age to 45 and, along with many other referees, he had to stand down at the end of 1991. He continued to referee in England, being chosen for the new Premier League in 1992, and in 1993 took charge of the League Cup Final between Arsenal and Sheffield Wednesday.

He was then granted a further domestic extension. Early in 1994, though, he decided to retire at the end of the season at the age of 51, after a 17-year career on the full List. He accepted an offer from the FA in 2000 to become a member of the video panel reviewing match events and disciplinary matters. He died in 2004.

Preceded by Joe Worrall	FA Cup Final Referee; 1990	Succeeded by Roger Milford
