= Jon Purdie =

English footballer

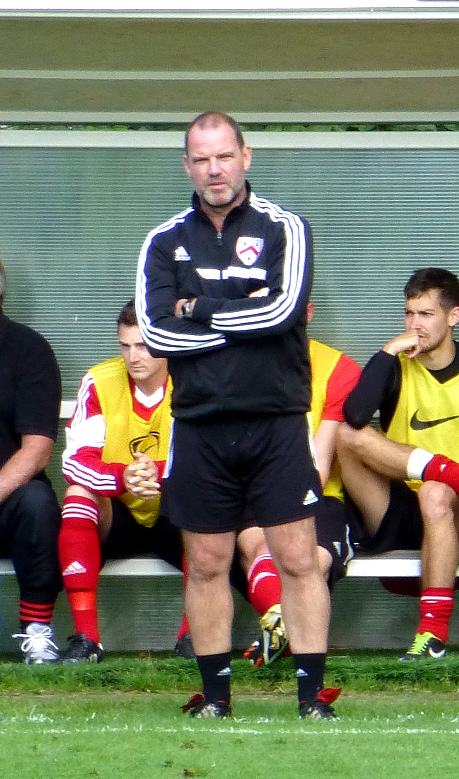
- Purdie managing AFC Wulfrunians in September 2013

Personal information
- Full name: Jonathan Purdie
- Date of birth: 22 February 1967 (age 59)
- Place of birth: Corby, England
- Position: Winger

Youth career
- 1983–85: Arsenal

Senior career*
Years	Team	Apps	(Gls)
1985–1988	Wolverhampton Wanderers	89	(12)
1987	→ Cambridge United (loan)	7	(2)
1988	Oxford United	11	(0)
1989	Brentford	6	(0)
1989–1990	Shrewsbury Town	12	(1)
1989–1990	Cheltenham Town		
1990–1991	Worcester City		
1991–1992	Cheltenham Town		
1992–1995	Kidderminster Harriers		
1995–1998	Telford United		
1998–1999	Kidderminster Harriers		
1999–2000	Worcester City		
2013	AFC Wulfrunians	1	(0)

Managerial career
- 2010–2012: AFC Wulfrunians Youth
- 2012–2013: AFC Wulfrunians
- 2015–2016: Bilston Town
- * Club domestic league appearances and goals

Jon Purdie (born 22 February 1967) is an English former professional footballer who is the coach of Samui United Academy Under-15s.

== Career ==
Purdie started his career at Arsenal, playing in the youth team alongside Tony Adams, Paul Merson and David Rocastle. He moved to Wolverhampton Wanderers in 1985, and went on to make more than 100 appearances for the club, with one manager at Wolves, Sammy Chapman, placing a £1 million price tag on him. Wolves released him shortly after the 1988 Associate Members' Cup Final at Wembley Stadium, for which he was cup-tied. Purdie opted to go part-time with several non-league clubs, a particular highlight coming during a third-round FA Cup tie in 1994 for Kidderminster Harriers against Birmingham City, where his 25-yard shot beat Ian Bennett in the Birmingham goal and put Kidderminster into the fourth-round draw.

Purdie played at Telford United and Worcester City, before turning his hand to management, first managing the youth team before partnering Steve Palmer in 2012 to manage the first team at AFC Wulfrunians. In April 2013, Purdie made a substitute appearance for Wulfs away at Darlaston Town in the West Midlands Regional League Premier Division, on the way to managing Wulfrunians to the title.

Purdie recently published an autobiography. Purdie, Jon (2021). Purds, Booze and Footy. Verite CM Ltd, Worthing BN12 4BG. ISBN 978-1-914388-09-5.
