= 1987 Football League play-offs =

Football League play-offs
- Season: 1986–87
- Champions: Charlton Athletic (Second Division); Swindon Town (Third Division); Aldershot (Fourth Division)
- Matches played: 20
- Goals scored: 45 (2.25 per match)
- Biggest home win: Aldershot 2–0 Wolves (Fourth Division)
- Biggest away win: Colchester 0–2 Wolves (Fourth Division)
- Highest scoring: Sunderland 4–3 Gillingham (7 goals)
- Highest attendance: 31,395 – Leeds v Charlton (Second Division final)
- Lowest attendance: 4,164 – Aldershot v Bolton (Fourth Division semi-final)
- Average attendance: 15,469

The Football League play-offs for the 1986–87 season were held in May 1987, with the two-legged finals taking place at the finalists home stadiums. The play-off semi-finals were also played over two legs and were contested by the teams who finished in 3rd, 4th and 5th place in the Football League Second Division and Football League Third Division and the 4th, 5th, 6th placed teams in the Football League Fourth Division table, along with a team from the league above. The winners of the semi-finals progressed through to the finals, with the winner of these matches either gaining promotion or avoiding relegation for the following season.

== Background ==
The Football League play-offs have been held every year since 1987. They take place for each division following the conclusion of the regular season and are contested by the four clubs finishing below the automatic promotion places. For the first three seasons the final was played over two legs but this was changed to a single match at Wembley Stadium from 1990. Additionally, for the 1986–87 and 1987–88 play-offs the semi-finals included a team from the next league who had finished above the relegation positions up, e.g. one team from the first tier and three teams from the second tier. The team from the higher division would be relegated if they failed to win the play-offs, with the play-off winner being promoted in their place.

== Second Division ==
First Division relegation places

Pos	Team	Pld	W	D	L	GF	GA	GD	Pts
19	Charlton Athletic	42	11	11	20	45	55	–10	44
20	Leicester City	42	11	9	22	54	76	–22	42
21	Manchester City	42	8	15	19	36	57	–21	39
22	Aston Villa	42	8	12	22	45	79	–34	36

Second Division play-off places

Pos	Team	Pld	W	D	L	GF	GA	GD	Pts
3	Oldham Athletic	42	22	9	11	65	44	+21	75
4	Leeds United	42	19	11	12	58	44	+14	68
5	Ipswich Town	42	17	13	12	59	43	+16	64

=== Semi-finals ===
First leg

14 May 1987
19:30

Leeds United	1–0	Oldham Athletic
Edwards 89'

Elland Road, Leeds
Attendance: 29,472
Referee: George Tyson

14 May 1987
19:45

Ipswich Town	0–0	Charlton Athletic

Portman Road, Ipswich
Attendance: 18,465
Referee: Dennis Hedges

Second leg

17 May 1987
11:30

Charlton Athletic	2–1	Ipswich Town
Melrose 18', 20'		McCall 85'

Selhurst Park, London
Attendance: 11,234
Referee: Lester Shapter

Charlton Athletic won 2–1 on aggregate.

17 May 1987
12:00

Oldham Athletic	2–1 (a.e.t.)	Leeds United
Williams 18'; Cecere 89'		Edwards 90'

Boundary Park, Oldham
Attendance: 19,216
Referee: George Courtney

Oldham Athletic 2–2 Leeds United on aggregate. Leeds United won on away goals.

=== Final ===
First leg

23 May 1987
15:00

Charlton Athletic	1–0	Leeds United
Melrose 87'

Selhurst Park, London
Attendance: 16,680
Referee: Roger Milford

Second leg

25 May 1987
19:30

Leeds United	1–0	Charlton Athletic
Ormsby 54'

Elland Road, Leeds
Attendance: 31,395
Referee: Bob Nixon

Leeds United 1–1 Charlton Athletic on aggregate.

Replay

29 May 1987
19:30

Charlton Athletic	2–1 (a.e.t.)	Leeds United
Shirtliff 113', 117'		Sheridan 99'

St Andrew's, Birmingham
Attendance: 18,000
Referee: Allan Gunn

== Third Division ==
Second Division relegation places

Pos	Team	Pld	W	D	L	GF	GA	GD	Pts
20	Sunderland	42	12	12	18	49	59	–10	48
21	Grimsby Town	42	10	14	18	39	59	–20	44
22	Brighton & Hove Albion	42	9	12	21	37	54	–17	39

Third Division play-off places

Pos	Team	Pld	W	D	L	GF	GA	GD	Pts
3	Swindon Town	46	25	12	9	77	47	+30	87
4	Wigan Athletic	46	25	10	11	83	60	+23	85
5	Gillingham	46	23	9	14	65	48	+17	78

=== Semi-finals ===
First leg

14 May 1987
19:45

Gillingham	3–2	Sunderland
Cascarino 64'		Proctor 29' (pen.)

Priestfield, Gillingham
Attendance: 13,804
Referee: Brian Hill

14 May 1987
19:45

Wigan Athletic	2–3	Swindon Town
Thompson 3'; Lowe 15'		Bamber; Quinn; Coyne

Springfield Park, Wigan
Attendance: 5,718
Referee: Keith Hackett

Second leg

17 May 1987
15:00

Sunderland	4–3 (a.e.t.)	Gillingham
Gates 17' 21'; Bennett 88'; Bertschin 108'		Pritchard 2'; Cascarino 51', 92'

Roker Park, Sunderland
Attendance: 25,470
Referee: Michael Peck

Sunderland 6–6 Gillingham on aggregate. Gillingham won on away goals.

17 May 1987
15:00

Swindon Town	0–0	Wigan Athletic

County Ground, Swindon
Attendance: 12,485
Referee: Allan Gunn

Swindon Town won 3–2 on aggregate.

=== Final ===
First leg

22 May 1987
19:45

Gillingham	1–0	Swindon Town
Smith 81'

Priestfield, Gillingham
Attendance: 16,775
Referee: Alf Buksh

Second leg

25 May 1987
19:45

Swindon Town	2–1	Gillingham
Coyne 61'; Henry 80'		Elsey 15'

County Ground, Swindon
Attendance: 14,382
Referee: Lester Shapter

Swindon Town 2–2 Gillingham on aggregate.

Replay

29 May 1987
20:00

Gillingham	0–2	Swindon Town
		White 2', 65'

Selhurst Park, London
Attendance: 18,491
Referee: John Martin

== Fourth Division ==
Third Division relegation places

Pos	Team	Pld	W	D	L	GF	GA	GD	Pts
21	Bolton Wanderers	46	10	15	21	46	58	–12	45
22	Carlisle United	46	10	8	28	39	78	–39	38
23	Darlington	46	7	16	23	45	77	–32	37
24	Newport County	46	8	13	25	49	86	–37	37

Fourth Division play-off places

Pos	Team	Pld	W	D	L	GF	GA	GD	Pts
4	Wolverhampton Wanderers	46	24	7	15	69	50	+19	79
5	Colchester United	46	21	7	18	64	56	+8	70
6	Aldershot	46	20	10	16	64	57	+7	70

=== Semi-finals ===
First leg

14 May 1987
19:30

Colchester United	0–2	Wolverhampton Wanderers
		Kelly 28'; Bull 32'

Layer Road, Colchester
Attendance: 4,829

14 May 1987
19:45

Aldershot	1–0	Bolton Wanderers
Johnson 87'

Recreation Ground, Aldershot
Attendance: 4,164

Second leg

17 May 1987
12:00

Wolverhampton Wanderers	0–0	Colchester United

Molineux, Wolverhampton
Attendance: 16,330

Wolverhampton Wanderers won 2–0 on aggregate.

17 May 1987
15:00

Bolton Wanderers	2–2 (a.e.t.)	Aldershot
Caldwell 50' (pen.), 81'		Anderson; Burvill

Burnden Park, Bolton
Attendance: 7,445

Aldershot won 3–2 on aggregate.

=== Final ===
First leg

22 May 1987
19:45

Aldershot	2–0	Wolverhampton Wanderers
McDonald 4'; Barnes 47' (pen.)

Recreation Ground, Aldershot
Attendance: 5,069
Referee: Allan Gunn

Second leg

25 May 1987
15:00

Wolverhampton Wanderers	0–1	Aldershot
		Barnes 81'

Molineux, Wolverhampton
Attendance: 19,962
Referee: Keith Hackett

Aldershot won 3–0 on aggregate.
