= Nicky Clarke (footballer) =

English footballer

Personal information
- Date of birth: 20 August 1967 (age 59)
- Place of birth: Walsall, England
- Height: 5 ft 11 in (1.80 m)
- Position: Defender

Senior career*
Years	Team	Apps	(Gls)
1985–1991	Wolverhampton Wanderers	81	(1)
1991–1994	Mansfield Town	43	(5)
1992–1993	→ Chesterfield (loan)	7	(0)
1993–1994	→ Doncaster Rovers (loan)	5	(0)
- Bromsgrove Rovers
Total		136	(6)
- * Club domestic league appearances and goals

Nick Clarke (born 20 August 1967) is an English former footballer who played in the Football League for Chesterfield, Doncaster Rovers, Mansfield Town and Wolverhampton Wanderers.
