= Aldershot F.C. =

Former association football club in England

Aldershot
- Full name: Aldershot Football Club
- Nickname: The Shots
- Founded: 1926
- Dissolved: 1992 (reformed as Aldershot Town)
- Ground: Recreation Ground
- Capacity: 7,100
Home colours	Away colours	Third colours

Aldershot Football Club was a football club from Aldershot, Hampshire, England, that played in the English Football League from 1932 to 1992. The club was nicknamed The Shots for both the last syllable of the town name and the military links to the town. They played home games at the Recreation Ground throughout their history.

Founded as Aldershot Town in 1926, they joined the Southern League the following year and were crowned champions in 1929–30. They were elected into the Football League Third Division South in 1932, where they would remain until becoming founder members of the Fourth Division in 1958. Promotion was secured at the end of the 1972–73 season, though they were relegated in 1976. Aldershot were the first ever winners of a Football League play-off competition, when they beat Wolverhampton Wanderers in the Fourth Division play-offs in 1987. However, they were relegated from the Third Division after just two seasons. They became the first Football League club in 30 years to resign from the League during the course of a season; the club was wound up in the High Court in March 1992. In response to the bankruptcy a group of supporters set up a new club, Aldershot Town, which still plays at the Recreation Ground.

== History ==
=== Non-League years: 1926–1932 ===
The club was founded in 1926 as Aldershot Town FC when Jack White, a sports journalist persuaded council officials that the garrison town needed a professional football club. In 1927 the club joined the Southern League, playing their first game on 27 August 1927 in a 4–0 win over Grays Athletic in front of a 3,500-strong crowd at the Recreation Ground. They finished their first season in seventh place, and in 1932 won the Southern League title, being elected to the Football League in place of Thames who had declined to apply for re-election. The name was changed to Aldershot prior to their inaugural 1932–33 League season.

=== Early league years: 1932–1958 ===
Chart of yearly table positions of Aldershot in the football league

Aldershot's first Football League season ended with a 17th place in the Third Division South, and a year later they improved slightly to finish 14th. They failed to make much of an impact in the league until they finished 11th in 1935–36, but in 1936–37 they finished bottom of the league and had to apply for re-election in order to avoid slipping back into the Southern League. Good progress over the next two seasons saw them climb to 10th in the league in the 1939 final table. Their 18th-place finish in 1958 meant that they would play in the new Football League Fourth Division in the 1958–59 season, following a restructuring of the Football League which saw an end to the regionalised two sections of the Third Division.

=== The Fourth Division years: 1958–1973 ===
Aldershot F.C. were among the founder members of the Fourth Division in the 1958–59 season. An FA Cup match against Carlisle United on 28 January 1970 saw Aldershot's record attendance of 19,138.

They finished 22nd in the first season of the Fourth Division and once again had to apply for re-election.

Promotion to the Third Division was finally achieved in 1973, their first promotion in 41 years of league football. They went up in fourth place after finishing ahead of Newport County on goal average.

=== The Third Division years: 1973–1976 ===
1973–74 brought Aldershot's highest-ever finish as they came eighth in the Third Division. This gave hope that Aldershot could soon be playing Second Division football – this was all the more anticipated as the mid to late 1970s saw several big clubs – including Manchester United, Tottenham Hotspur, Nottingham Forest, Chelsea and Newcastle United – playing at least one season in the second tier. However, it was not to be, as Aldershot finished 20th in the Third Division in 1975 and only avoided relegation on goal average. They were relegated by a single point the following year.

=== Back in the Fourth Division: 1976–1985 ===
Two years after relegation, Aldershot almost returned to the Third Division in 1978, but were pipped to promotion by Brentford. More significantly, they were also pipped to promotion by Watford and Swansea City, who were both playing top-division football within the next five years. A similar disappointment followed a year later, as they were pipped to promotion by a single place – this time by a Wimbledon side who were First Division members and FA Cup winners less than a decade later. On the plus side, Aldershot finished above two much more illustrious clubs – Portsmouth and Huddersfield Town – who were both former winners of the league title and FA Cup.

In 1981, Aldershot suffered their third promotion disappointment in four seasons as they finished sixth – once again being beaten to a place in the top four by Wimbledon. In the 1981–82 season, Aldershot struggled badly and finished 16th. It was the first season of the Football League's "3 points for a win" system, and they finished just eight points outside the "re-election zone".

They continued to struggle in the Fourth Division, until the appointment of new manager Len Walker in June 1985. However, 1983–84 had brought a brief respite, as Aldershot finished fifth, before another setback saw them finish 13th.

In 1984–85, Aldershot took a young striker at the time on loan from Millwall – Teddy Sheringham, the future England international player. Millwall manager George Graham had been willing to sell Sheringham to Aldershot on a permanent basis, but they could not raise the £5,000 fee.

=== The final years: 1985–1992 ===
The arrival of Len Walker as manager in June 1985 sparked a brief revival in Aldershot's fortunes. Although they finished 16th in 1985–86, they emerged as strong promotion contenders in the 1986–87 season, finishing sixth on 70 points and occupying the final playoff place in the division. It was the first season of the Football League play-offs, which in their first two seasons operated as a promotion/relegation decider between the First/Second, Second/Third and Third/Fourth divisions before a reorganisation saw them operate solely as promotion deciders. In the semi-finals, they condemned Third Division Bolton Wanderers (four times winners of the FA Cup, and First Division members as recently as 1980) to Fourth Division football for the first time in their history. This gave them a place in the final, against another side more familiar with the higher divisions – Wolverhampton Wanderers, three times league champions, four times FA Cup winners, and twice Football League Cup winners, who had only been relegated from the top flight in 1984. Aldershot gave Wolves one of the most humiliating defeats of their history by winning 3–0 on aggregate over two legs.

Aldershot were widely expected to go straight back down to the Fourth Division in 1987–88, but managed to avoid automatic relegation by two places and three points, finishing one point and one place ahead of the relegation play-off place.

However, a disastrous season in 1988–89 saw Aldershot go down in bottom place with just eight wins and 37 points all season placing them 17 points adrift of safety.

By this stage, a financial crisis was dawning upon the club as debts were mounting and as the 1989–90 season began, the task at Aldershot was to avoid being relegated or expelled from the Football League, rather than mounting a promotion challenge. Aldershot finished 22nd in the Fourth Division that season, and were in danger of a second successive relegation right up to the end of April.

However, the financial crisis was worsening and it seemed highly doubtful that Aldershot would be able to start the 1990–91 season.

On 31 July 1990, Aldershot were wound up in the High Court as the Official Receiver condemned them as "hopelessly insolvent" with debts of £495,000. However, the winding-up order was lifted on 7 August 1990 when 19-year-old property developer Spencer Trethewy paid £200,000 to save the club and allow them to start the new Fourth Division campaign. It soon emerged that Trethewy did not have the funds to keep the club running, and he was dismissed from the board on 1 November 1990. Trethewy's shady dealings finally caught up with him in 1994 when he was convicted of fraud and received a two-year prison sentence.

Aldershot's problems continued as they finished the 1990–91 season second from bottom in the league. They had taken in three new players near the end of the season in the form of Roger Davis, Dion Smith and Steve Batler. These changes came too late in the season to save the Shots from another low finish, and the club’s debts continued to rise. There was no relegation this season due to an expansion in the league's size to 93 clubs from the previous total of 92.

There was a brief respite for the club on 5 January 1991, when it held West Ham United to a surprise goalless draw in the FA Cup third round at Upton Park. The Hammers won the replay 6–1 and went on to reach the semi-finals, also winning promotion to the First Division that season.

Len Walker had stepped up to the role of general manager in March 1991, with Brian Talbot taking over as player-manager.

However, Aldershot's debts were mounting and although they were able to begin the 1991–92 Fourth Division campaign, as the season wore on it looked more and more likely that the club would go under. As well as that, the problems were showing on the field as Aldershot struggled near the foot of the league.

Manager Brian Talbot resigned in November 1991 to be succeeded by Ian McDonald.

On 25 March 1992 Aldershot F.C. finally went out of business with debts of more than £1million, and were obliged to resign from the Football League. The results of their completed fixtures were declared void. The final game played was a 2–0 defeat against Cardiff City at Ninian Park on 20 March. The last home game was a 3–0 defeat to Lincoln City, also in the league, on 14 March. Aldershot's final eight competitive games all ended in defeat and they had not won any of their final 16 games; their last competitive win was on 28 December 1991 away to Maidstone United in the Fourth Division. Ironically, Maidstone also went out of business and had to leave the Football League just five months after Aldershot's demise.

Aldershot's league record for the 1991–92 season, which had seen them play 36 games, was expunged.

=== The new Aldershot club: 1992–present ===
In response to the bankruptcy a group of supporters set up a new club, Aldershot Town, which started in the Isthmian League Division Three, five levels below the division in which Aldershot F.C. had been playing. Aldershot Town were playing in League Two after being promoted on 15 April 2008, but their run came to an end after relegation to Conference Premier on 27 April 2013.

== Records ==
Best League finish	Football League Third Division 8th, 1973–74
Best FA Cup finish	Fifth Round Replay, 1932–33 & 1978–79
Best League Cup finish	Fourth round, 1983–84
Highest home attendance	19,138: vs Carlisle United, FA Cup Fourth round Replay, 28 January 1970
Most League goals in a season	83, Football League Fourth Division, 1963–64
Most League goals	Jack Howarth; 171, 1965–1977
Most League appearances	Murray Brodie; 461, 1970–1983
Highest transfer fee paid	£54,000: Colin Garwood from Portsmouth, February 1980
Highest transfer fee received	£150,000: Tony Lange to Wolverhampton Wanderers, July 1989

== Honours ==
- Fourth Division (level 4)
  - 4th place promotion: 1972–73
  - Play-off winners: 1987
- Southern League
  - Champions: 1929–30
- London Combination
  - Winners: 1931
