= List of Newport County A.F.C. managers =

Newport County is a professional Association football club based in the city of Newport, South Wales. The club was founded in 1912 as The Newport & Monmouth County Association Football Club, nicknamed The Ironsides after the Lysaght's Orb Works in the town. The club began in the Southern League but was reformed in 1919 and elected into the Football League in 1920. The first manager of Newport County was Davy McDougall, appointed in 1912.

== History ==
Newport's first ever manager, the Scottish wing-half McDougall, played for the club in its first year as a player-manager before moving to management. Billy Lucas is the club's longest serving manager having spent 17 years at Newport across three spells from 1953 to 1961, 1962–1967, and 1970–1974. Jimmy Hindmarsh is the club's longest continuously serving manager having spent 13 years at the club from 1922 until 1935. Newport's shortest reigning manager is Lee Harrison, who spent 5 days in charge as caretaker manager in 2011. The club's shortest reigning permanent manager is Eddie May who spent one month at the club during its tumultuous 1988 season.

Four managers have returned to the club for more than one spell in charge: Billy Lucas (1953–61, 1962–67, 1970–74), Colin Addison (1977–78, 1982–85), John Relish (1986, 1989–1993), and Tim Harris (1997–2002, 2011).

The club's most successful manager for honours is Len Ashurst who achieved promotion and a Cup win at the club. However Peter Beadle also achieved Cup wins and runner-up places, and Justin Edinburgh achieved a division play off victory and Cup runner-up place.

Three Newport County managers have been inducted into the club's Hall of Fame: Dave Williams, John Relish and Justin Edinburgh. Edinburgh was posthumously inducted in December 2019 before a fixture between Newport and Leyton Orient, who he was manager of at the time of his unexpected death in June 2019.

== Achievements ==
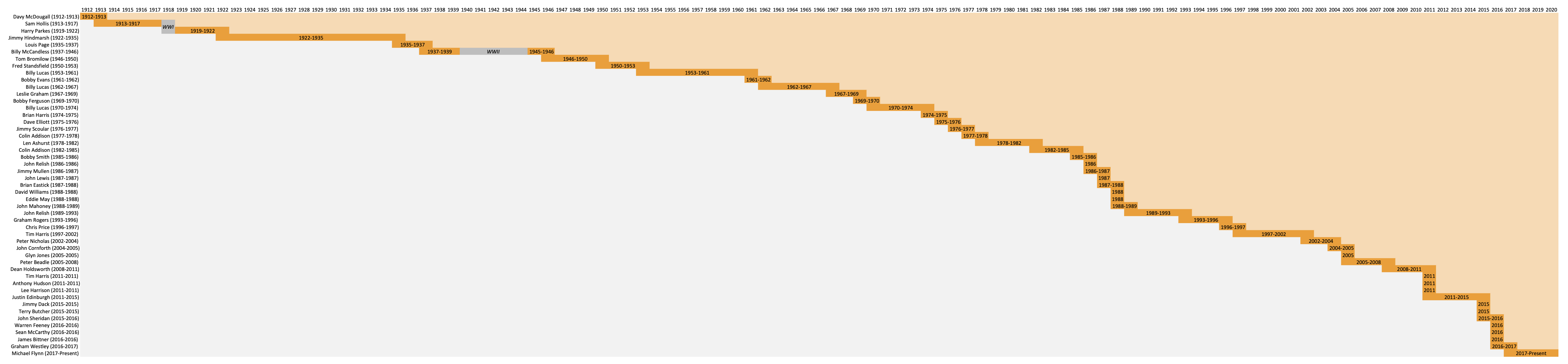
Newport County A.F.C. managerial timeline

The first manager under whom Newport won a major trophy was Billy McCandless, who guided the club to the Third Division South championship in the 1938–39 season. Newport reached the fifth round of the 1948–49 FA Cup under manager Tom Bromilow, the furthest they have gone in the competition, later equalled in 2019. They only narrowly lost the game 3–2 to Portsmouth. Bobby Evans led the club to become runners-up in the 1963 Welsh Cup. Len Ashurst achieved a third place promotion in the 1979–80 Football League Fourth Division and the club became Welsh Cup champions in 1980 under Ashhurst. In 1987 under John Lewis the club were runners-up in the Welsh Cup, losing to Merthyr in the final.

In 1989–90 John Relish secured the Hellenic League championship. Graham Rogers achieved the 1994–1995 Southern League Midland Division championship. Tim Harris again achieved the 2nd place promotion spot in the 1998–1999 Southern League Midland Division season. Peter Nicholas led the club to the runners-up spot in the 2003 FAW Premier Cup, which the club again achieved under Peter Beadle in 2007, and which was followed by Newport winning the competition the following year. Dean Holdsworth led the club to become Conference South champions in 2009–2010. The club were FA Trophy runners-up in 2012 under Justin Edinburgh. Edinburgh produced the club's most recent honours in 2013 when he went on to lead the club back into the Football League, winning the Conference National play-offs against fellow Welsh opponents Wrexham.

Michael Flynn led the club to its joint best performance in the FA Cup, playing against Manchester City in the 2018–19 FA Cup 5th Round for only the second time since 1948–49. Flynn took the club to the 2019 EFL League Two play-off finals where Newport were defeated by Tranmere Rovers and reached the semi-finals of the 2019–20 EFL Trophy where Newport lost to Salford City on penalties. Flynn again led Newport to the 2021 EFL League Two play-off final, losing 1–0 to Morecambe.

== List of managers ==
No.	Picture	Name	Nationality	Contract	From	To	Length of tenure
1		Davy McDougall	Scotland	Manager / player-manager	1 July 1912	30 June 1913	1 year
2		Sam Hollis	England	Manager	1 July 1913	30 June 1917	5 years
3		Harry Parkes	England	Manager / player-manager	1 July 1919	30 June 1922	3 years
4		Jimmy Hindmarsh	England	Manager	1 July 1922	30 June 1935	13 years
5		Louis Page	England	Manager	1 July 1935	9 September 1937	2 years, 2 months, 9 days
6		Billy McCandless	Ireland	Manager	9 September 1937	8 April 1946	8 years, 7 months
7		Tom Bromilow	England	Manager	9 April 1946	30 June 1950	4 years, 2 months, 22 days
8		Fred Stansfield	Wales	Manager	1 July 1950	30 June 1953	3 years
9		Billy Lucas	Wales	Manager / player-manager	1 July 1953	30 June 1961	8 years
10		Bobby Evans	Scotland	Manager / player-manager	1 July 1961	30 June 1962	1 year
11		Billy Lucas	Wales	Manager / player-manager	1 July 1962	30 June 1967	5 years
12		Leslie Graham	England	Manager	1 July 1967	30 June 1969	2 years
13		Bobby Ferguson	England	Manager / player-manager	1 July 1969	30 June 1970	1 year
14		Billy Lucas	Wales	Manager / player-manager	1 July 1970	30 June 1974	4 years
15		Brian Harris	England	Manager	1 July 1974	14 March 1975	8 months, 14 days
16		Dave Elliott	England	Manager / player-manager	15 March 1975	30 June 1976	1 year, 3 months, 16 days
17		Jimmy Scoular	Scotland	Manager	1 July 1976	30 June 1977	1 year
18		Colin Addison	England	Manager	1 July 1977	30 June 1978	1 year
19		Len Ashurst	England	Manager	1 July 1978	30 June 1982	4 years
20		Colin Addison	England	Manager	1 July 1982	30 June 1985	3 years, 1 month
21		Bobby Smith	England	Manager	1 June 1985	25 March 1986	9 months, 25 days
22		John Relish	England	Player-manager	25 March 1986	30 June 1986	3 months, 6 days
23		Jimmy Mullen	England	Player-manager	1 July 1986	5 March 1987	8 months, 5 days
24		John Lewis	Wales	Manager / player-manager	5 March 1987	7 September 1987	6 months, 3 days
25		Brian Eastick	England	Manager	7 September 1987	11 March 1988	6 months, 5 days
26		Dave Williams	Wales	Caretaker manager	11 March 1988	1 August 1988	4 months, 22 days
27		Eddie May	England	Manager	1 August 1988	31 August 1988	1 month
28		John Mahoney	Wales	Manager	1 September 1988	30 June 1989	10 months
29		John Relish	England	Manager / player-manager	1 July 1989	30 June 1993	4 years
30		Graham Rogers	England	Manager	1 July 1993	30 June 1996	3 years
31		Chris Price	England	Manager	1 July 1996	30 June 1997	1 year
32		Tim Harris	England	Manager	1 July 1997	14 November 2002	5 years, 4 months, 14 days
33		Peter Nicholas	Wales	Manager	15 November 2002	13 September 2004	1 year, 9 months, 30 days
34		John Cornforth	Wales	Manager	29 September 2004	13 September 2005	11 months, 16 days
35		Glyn Jones	Wales	Caretaker manager	13 September 2005	9 October 2005	27 days
36		Peter Beadle	England	Manager	9 October 2005	27 April 2008	2 years, 6 months, 19 days
37		Dean Holdsworth	England	Manager	1 June 2008	11 January 2011	2 years, 7 months, 11 days
38		Tim Harris	England	Manager	11 January 2011	1 April 2011	2 months, 22 days
39		Anthony Hudson	England	Manager	1 April 2011	28 September 2011	5 months, 28 days
40		Lee Harrison	England	Caretaker player-manager	29 September 2011	3 October 2011	5 days
41		Justin Edinburgh	England	Manager	4 October 2011	6 February 2015	3 years, 4 months, 3 days
42		Jimmy Dack	England	Manager	7 February 2015	4 May 2015	2 months, 28 days
43		Terry Butcher	England	Manager	4 May 2015	1 October 2015	4 months, 28 days
44		John Sheridan	Ireland	Manager	5 October 2015	12 January 2016	3 months, 8 days
45		Warren Feeney	Northern Ireland	Manager	13 January 2016	28 September 2016	8 months, 16 days
46		James Bittner; Sean McCarthy	EnglandWales	Caretaker / player-manager Caretaker manager	28 September 2016	7 October 2016	10 days
47		Graham Westley	England	Permanent	7 October 2016	9 March 2017	5 months, 3 days
48		Michael Flynn	Wales	Caretaker (9 March – 9 May 2017); Player-manager (9 May 2017 – November 2018) Manager (November 2018 – 1 October 2021)	9 March 2017	1 October 2021	5 years, 7 months
49		Wayne Hatswell	England	Caretaker manager	1 October 2021	19 October 2021	18 days
50		James Rowberry	Wales	Manager	19 October 2021	10 October 2022	12 months
51		Darren Kelly	Northern Ireland	Caretaker manager	10 October 2022	20 October 2022	10 days
52		Graham Coughlan	Ireland	Manager	20 October 2022	20 June 2024	1 year, 8 months
53		Nelson Jardim	Portugal	Head coach	16 July 2024	24 April 2025	9 months
54		Dafydd Williams	Wales	Caretaker head coach	25 April 2025	09 May 2025	14 days
55		David Hughes	Wales	Manager	23 May 2025	15 November 2025	6 Months
56		Christian Fuchs	Austria	Manager	20 November 2025	27 June 2026	7 Months
57		Chris Todd	Wales	Interim Manager	28 June 2026	30 July 2026	5 Weeks
58		Hayden Mullins	England	Manager	31 July 2026	Present	

== Managers with honours ==
Name	Nationality	From	To	Honours
Justin Edinburgh	England	4 October 2011	6 February 2015	2013 Conference Premier play-off final winners, 2012 FA Trophy Final runners-up
Dean Holdsworth	England	1 June 2008	11 January 2011	Conference South Champions
Peter Beadle	England	9 October 2005	27 April 2008	2007–08 FAW Premier Cup winners, 2006–07 FAW Premier Cup runners-up
Peter Nicholas	Wales	15 November 2002	13 September 2004	2002–03 FAW Premier Cup runners-up
Graham Rogers	England	1 July 1993	30 June 1996	Southern Football League, Midland Division second place promotion
John Relish	England	1 July 1989	30 June 1993	Hellenic League Premier Champions
John Lewis	Wales	5 March 1987	7 September 1987	1986–87 Welsh Cup runners-up
Len Ashurst	England	1 July 1978	30 June 1982	1979–80 Football League Fourth Division third place promotion 1979–80 Welsh Cup Champions
Bobby Evans	Scotland	1 July 1961	30 June 1962	1962–63 Welsh Cup runners-up
Billy McCandless	Ireland	9 September 1937	8 April 1946	1938–39 Third Division South Champions

== Hall of Fame ==
Inducted date	Name	Born	Died	Nationality	Manager from	Manager to	Honours
18 September 2009	John Relish	5 October 1953	—N/a	England	1 July 1989	30 June 1993	Hellenic League Premier Champions
28 December 2019	Justin Edinburgh	18 December 1969	8 June 2019 (aged 49)	England	4 October 2011	6 February 2015	2013 Conference Premier play-off final winners, 2012 FA Trophy Final runners-up
