= 1955–56 Newport County A.F.C. season =

Welsh association football club season

Newport County
1955–56 season
- Manager: Billy Lucas
- Stadium: Somerton Park
- Third Division South: 19th
- FA Cup: 1st round
- Welsh Cup: Semi-final
- Top goalscorer: League: Johnston (20); All: Johnston (24)
- Highest home attendance: 9,012 vs Torquay United (10 September 1955)
- Lowest home attendance: 2,346 vs Swindon Town (12 April 1956)
- Average home league attendance: 6,548
Home colours	Away colours

The 1955–56 season was Newport County's 28th season in the Football League and ninth consecutive season in the Third Division South since relegation from the Second Division at the end of the 1946–47 season.

== Season review ==
=== Results summary ===
Overall								Home						Away					
Pld	W	D	L	GF	GA	GAv	Pts	W	D	L	GF	GA	Pts	W	D	L	GF	GA	Pts
46	15	9	22	58	79	0.734	39	12	2	9	32	26	26	3	7	13	26	53	13

Source: rsssf.com

=== Results by round ===
Round	1	2	3	4	5	6	7	8	9	10	11	12	13	14	15	16	17	18	19	20	21	22	23	24	25	26	27	28	29	30	31	32	33	34	35	36	37	38	39	40	41	42	43	44	45	46
Ground	A	A	H	H	A	H	H	A	A	H	A	H	H	H	A	H	A	H	A	A	H	A	H	A	A	H	H	H	A	A	A	H	A	H	A	H	H	A	A	H	H	A	H	H	A	A
Result	L	L	W	L	D	W	W	D	L	L	W	L	W	W	L	D	D	W	W	D	L	L	L	L	L	W	W	L	D	D	L	D	W	W	L	L	L	L	L	L	W	D	W	W	L	L
Position	21	22	21	23	20	18	14	14	16	17	15	17	15	12	13	15	13	12	11	11	12	12	14	15	16	15	13	14	14	16	16	16	15	15	15	16	16	16	19	21	19	19	16	16	16	19

Updated to match(es) played on 28 Apr 1956. Source: statto.com
A = Away; H = Home; W = Win; D = Draw; L = Loss

== Fixtures and results ==
=== Third Division South ===
Date	Opponents	Venue	Result	Scorers	Attendance
20 Aug 1955	Shrewsbury Town	A	0–5		9,987
24 Aug 1955	Aldershot	A	0–1		6,212
27 Aug 1955	Ipswich Town	H	2–1	Shergold 2	8,595
1 Sep 1955	Aldershot	H	0–1		7,906
3 Sep 1955	Walsall	A	3–3	Johnston 2, Beech	14,443
8 Sep 1955	Southampton	H	1–0	Harris	7,048
10 Sep 1955	Torquay United	H	2–1	Beech, Brown	9,012
14 Sep 1955	Southampton	A	3–3	Shergold, Johnston, Harris	7,779
17 Sep 1955	Southend United	A	1–4	Johnston	11,243
22 Sep 1955	Crystal Palace	H	0–1		6,601
24 Sep 1955	Swindon Town	A	2–1	Johnston, Harris	7,870
29 Sep 1955	Northampton Town	H	0–1		8,076
1 Oct 1955	Queens Park Rangers	H	2–1	Harris 2,	7,375
8 Oct 1955	Leyton Orient	H	3–0	Johnston 3,	8,904
15 Oct 1955	Colchester United	A	1–2	Johnston	8,225
22 Oct 1955	Norwich City	H	2–2	Johnston, Beech	5,977
29 Oct 1955	Bournemouth & Boscombe Athletic	A	0–0		7,495
5 Nov 1955	Gillingham	H	3–2	Johnston 2, Beech	6,745
12 Nov 1955	Millwall	A	4–2	Harris 3, Johnston	9,174
26 Nov 1955	Watford	A	1–1	Johnston	7,180
3 Dec 1955	Brentford	H	1–2	Hudson	8,035
10 Dec 1955	Coventry City	A	0–3		17,325
17 Dec 1955	Shrewsbury Town	H	1–2	Beech	5,287
24 Dec 1955	Ipswich Town	A	2–3	Johnston 2	11,361
26 Dec 1955	Brighton & Hove Albion	A	1–4	Johnston	13,494
27 Dec 1955	Brighton & Hove Albion	H	1–0	Johnston	5,907
31 Dec 1955	Walsall	H	2–0	Harris 2	8,008
7 Jan 1956	Reading	H	2–3	Harris, Beech	7,605
14 Jan 1956	Torquay United	A	1–1	Johnston	6,346
11 Feb 1956	Queens Park Rangers	A	0–0		3,781
18 Feb 1956	Leyton Orient	A	1–3	Johnston	11,154
25 Feb 1956	Colchester United	H	0–0		5,588
3 Mar 1956	Norwich City	A	3–2	Shergold, Harris, Brown	14,145
10 Mar 1956	Bournemouth & Boscombe Athletic	H	1–0	Burgess	6,668
17 Mar 1956	Gillingham	A	2–3	Burgess, Harris	6,203
24 Mar 1956	Millwall	H	1–4	Hudson	4,567
30 Mar 1956	Exeter City	H	1–2	Harris	5,976
31 Mar 1956	Reading	A	0–3		7,664
2 Apr 1956	Exeter City	A	0–2		7,363
7 Apr 1956	Watford	H	0–1		3,993
12 Apr 1956	Swindon Town	H	1–0	Hudson	2,346
14 Apr 1956	Brentford	A	1–1	Shergold	5,291
19 Apr 1956	Southend United	H	2–0	Shergold, Burgess	4,286
21 Apr 1956	Coventry City	H	4–2	Burgess, Brown, Hudson, Tennant	6,100
26 Apr 1956	Northampton Town	A	0–5		3,436
28 Apr 1956	Crystal Palace	A	0–1		7,635

=== FA Cup ===
Round	Date	Opponents	Venue	Result	Scorers	Attendance
1	19 Nov 1955	Brighton & Hove Albion	A	1–8	Johnston	19,010

=== Welsh Cup ===
Round	Date	Opponents	Venue	Result	Scorers	Attendance	Notes
5	28 Jan 1956	Barry Town	H	8–1	Johnston 3, Hudson 3, Harris 2	4,033	
6	1 Mar 1956	Llanelly	H	5–1	Harris 2, Lever, Shergold, Docherty	1,689	
SF	21 Mar 1956	Swansea Town	N	2–5	Harris, Beech	9,655	At Ninian Park

== League table ==
Pos	Team	Pld	W	D	L	GF	GA	GAv	Pts
17	Reading	46	15	9	22	70	79	0.886	39
18	Queens Park Rangers	46	14	11	21	64	86	0.744	39
19	Newport County	46	15	9	22	58	79	0.734	39
20	Walsall	46	15	8	23	68	84	0.810	38
21	Watford	46	13	11	22	52	85	0.612	37
