= 1954–55 Newport County A.F.C. season =

Welsh association football club season

Newport County
1954–55 season
- Manager: Billy Lucas
- Stadium: Somerton Park
- Third Division South: 19th
- FA Cup: 1st round
- Welsh Cup: 6th round
- Top goalscorer: League: Johnston (26); All: Johnston (29)
- Highest home attendance: 13,318 vs Norwich City (26 August 1954)
- Lowest home attendance: 5,066 vs Reading (2 April 1955)
- Average home league attendance: 8,400
| Home colours | Away colours |

The 1954–55 season was Newport County's eighth consecutive season in the Third Division South since relegation from the Second Division at the end of the 1946–47 season. It was the club's 26th season in the third tier and 27th season overall in the Football League.

== Season review ==
=== Results summary ===
| Overall | | | | | | | | Home | | | | | | Away | | | | | |
| Pld | W | D | L | GF | GA | GAv | Pts | W | D | L | GF | GA | Pts | W | D | L | GF | GA | Pts |
|---|---|---|---|---|---|---|---|---|---|---|---|---|---|---|---|---|---|---|---|
| 46 | 11 | 16 | 19 | 60 | 73 | 0.822 | 38 | 8 | 8 | 7 | 32 | 29 | 24 | 3 | 8 | 12 | 28 | 44 | 14 |

Source: rsssf.com

=== Results by round ===
| Round | 1 | 2 | 3 | 4 | 5 | 6 | 7 | 8 | 9 | 10 | 11 | 12 | 13 | 14 | 15 | 16 | 17 | 18 | 19 | 20 | 21 | 22 | 23 | 24 | 25 | 26 | 27 | 28 | 29 | 30 | 31 | 32 | 33 | 34 | 35 | 36 | 37 | 38 | 39 | 40 | 41 | 42 | 43 | 44 | 45 | 46 |
|---|---|---|---|---|---|---|---|---|---|---|---|---|---|---|---|---|---|---|---|---|---|---|---|---|---|---|---|---|---|---|---|---|---|---|---|---|---|---|---|---|---|---|---|---|---|---|
| Ground | H | H | A | A | H | A | A | H | A | A | H | H | A | H | A | H | A | H | A | A | H | A | A | H | H | A | H | H | A | H | H | A | A | H | A | H | A | H | A | A | H | H | A | H | H | A |
| Result | L | D | L | L | D | D | L | W | L | D | W | W | L | D | L | W | W | L | L | D | D | D | L | L | L | D | W | L | D | D | L | D | W | D | L | W | L | D | L | W | W | W | D | D | L | L |
| Position | 21 | 19 | 22 | 23 | 23 | 23 | 23 | 22 | 23 | 22 | 21 | 20 | 21 | 20 | 21 | 19 | 17 | 18 | 20 | 20 | 20 | 20 | 20 | 22 | 22 | 21 | 19 | 21 | 21 | 20 | 23 | 23 | 20 | 20 | 21 | 21 | 21 | 19 | 21 | 18 | 18 | 18 | 18 | 19 | 19 | 19 |

Updated to match(es) played on 2 May 1955. Source: statto.com
A = Away; H = Home; W = Win; D = Draw; L = Loss

== Fixtures and results ==
=== Third Division South ===
| Date | Opponents | Venue | Result | Scorers | Attendance |
|---|---|---|---|---|---|
| 21 Aug 1954 | Northampton Town | H | 0–1 | | 12,710 |
| 26 Aug 1954 | Norwich City | H | 1–1 | Shergold | 13,318 |
| 28 Aug 1954 | Watford | A | 2–3 | Graham, OG | 14,957 |
| 1 Sep 1954 | Norwich City | A | 0–2 | | 16,382 |
| 4 Sep 1954 | Bournemouth & Boscombe Athletic | H | 1–1 | Shergold | 9,589 |
| 7 Sep 1954 | Southend United | A | 1–1 | Wharton | 8,025 |
| 11 Sep 1954 | Queens Park Rangers | A | 0–2 | | 13,115 |
| 16 Sep 1954 | Southend United | H | 3–2 | McGhee, Graham, Harris | 8,050 |
| 18 Sep 1954 | Brighton & Hove Albion | A | 1–4 | Shergold | 13,419 |
| 22 Sep 1954 | Aldershot | A | 0–0 | | 4,863 |
| 25 Sep 1954 | Exeter City | H | 2–1 | Lucas, Wharton | 9,166 |
| 30 Sep 1954 | Aldershot | H | 2–1 | Graham, Hudson | 6,027 |
| 2 Oct 1954 | Colchester United | A | 0–1 | | 8,691 |
| 9 Oct 1954 | Coventry City | H | 1–1 | Graham | 10,327 |
| 16 Oct 1954 | Southampton | A | 0–2 | | 13,880 |
| 23 Oct 1954 | Millwall | H | 2–1 | Graham, Wharton | 9,126 |
| 30 Oct 1954 | Torquay United | A | 3–2 | Johnston 2, Graham | 7,300 |
| 6 Nov 1954 | Gillingham | H | 1–3 | Lucas | 9,164 |
| 13 Nov 1954 | Reading | A | 1–2 | Johnston | 9,334 |
| 27 Nov 1954 | Walsall | A | 3–3 | Johnston 2, Graham | 12,059 |
| 4 Dec 1954 | Bristol City | H | 2–2 | Johnston 2 | 10,886 |
| 18 Dec 1954 | Northampton Town | A | 2–2 | Lucas, Harris | 6,947 |
| 25 Dec 1954 | Crystal Palace | A | 1–2 | Johnston | 8,934 |
| 27 Dec 1954 | Crystal Palace | H | 0–1 | | 13,025 |
| 1 Jan 1955 | Watford | H | 0–2 | | 7,132 |
| 15 Jan 1955 | Bournemouth & Boscombe Athletic | A | 3–3 | Shergold, Harris, Johnston | 5,830 |
| 22 Jan 1955 | Queens Park Rangers | H | 4–0 | Harris 2, Johnston 2 | 5,457 |
| 5 Feb 1955 | Brighton & Hove Albion | H | 1–3 | OG | 7,025 |
| 12 Feb 1955 | Exeter City | A | 1–1 | Johnston | 6,545 |
| 19 Feb 1955 | Colchester United | H | 0–0 | | 5,612 |
| 5 Mar 1955 | Southampton | H | 0–1 | | 7,512 |
| 12 Mar 1955 | Millwall | A | 1–1 | Johnston | 9,086 |
| 17 Mar 1955 | Leyton Orient | A | 2–1 | Graham, Johnston | 10,600 |
| 19 Mar 1955 | Torquay United | H | 1–1 | Johnston | 6,936 |
| 26 Mar 1955 | Gillingham | A | 2–4 | Johnston 2 | 7,784 |
| 2 Apr 1955 | Reading | H | 3–1 | Johnston 2, Shergold | 5,066 |
| 4 Apr 1955 | Coventry City | A | 2–3 | Harris, Johnston | 3,936 |
| 8 Apr 1955 | Swindon Town | H | 2–2 | Johnston, OG | 8,595 |
| 9 Apr 1955 | Shrewsbury Town | A | 0–3 | | 8,652 |
| 11 Apr 1955 | Swindon Town | A | 3–1 | Lucas, Harris, Johnston | 7,957 |
| 16 Apr 1955 | Walsall | H | 1–0 | Hudson | 7,914 |
| 21 Apr 1955 | Brentford | H | 3–1 | | 7,926 |
| 23 Apr 1955 | Bristol City | A | 0–0 | | 27,499 |
| 28 Apr 1955 | Shrewsbury Town | H | 1–1 | Johnston | 6,762 |
| 30 Apr 1955 | Leyton Orient | H | 1–2 | Johnston | 5,894 |
| 2 May 1955 | Brentford | A | 0–1 | | 5,812 |

=== FA Cup ===
| Round | Date | Opponents | Venue | Result | Scorers | Attendance |
|---|---|---|---|---|---|---|
| 1 | 20 Nov 1954 | Gillingham | A | 0–2 | | 10,237 |

=== Welsh Cup ===
| Round | Date | Opponents | Venue | Result | Scorers | Attendance |
|---|---|---|---|---|---|---|
| 5 | 13 Jan 1955 | Abergavenny Thursdays | H | 6–0 | McGhee 2, Johnston 2, Shergold, Harris | 690 |
| 6 | 17 Feb 1955 | Cardiff City | H | 1–3 | Johnston | 10,223 |

== League table ==
| Pos | Team | Pld | W | D | L | GF | GA | GAv | Pts |
|---|---|---|---|---|---|---|---|---|---|
| 17 | Bournemouth & Boscombe Athletic | 46 | 12 | 18 | 16 | 57 | 65 | 0.877 | 42 |
| 18 | Reading | 46 | 13 | 15 | 18 | 65 | 73 | 0.890 | 41 |
| 19 | Newport County | 46 | 11 | 16 | 19 | 60 | 73 | 0.822 | 38 |
| 20 | Crystal Palace | 46 | 11 | 16 | 19 | 52 | 80 | 0.650 | 38 |
| 21 | Swindon Town | 46 | 11 | 15 | 20 | 46 | 64 | 0.719 | 37 |

Source: rsssf.com
