= 1947–48 Newport County A.F.C. season =

Welsh association football club season

Newport County
1947–48 season
- Manager: Tom Bromilow
- Stadium: Somerton Park
- Third Division South: 12th
- FA Cup: 2nd round
- Welsh Cup: 5th round
- Top goalscorer: League: Carr/Williams (10); All: Carr (11)
- Highest home attendance: 16,565 vs Bristol City (28 August 1947)
- Lowest home attendance: 5,817 vs Brighton & Hove Albion (22 November 1947)
- Average home league attendance: 11,239
Home colours	Away colours

The 1947–48 season was Newport County's first season back in Division Three South following relegation from the Second Division the previous season.

== Season review ==
=== Results summary ===
Overall								Home						Away					
Pld	W	D	L	GF	GA	GAv	Pts	W	D	L	GF	GA	Pts	W	D	L	GF	GA	Pts
42	14	13	15	61	73	0.836	41	9	8	4	38	28	26	5	5	11	23	45	15

Source: rsssf.com

=== Results by round ===
Round	1	2	3	4	5	6	7	8	9	10	11	12	13	14	15	16	17	18	19	20	21	22	23	24	25	26	27	28	29	30	31	32	33	34	35	36	37	38	39	40	41	42
Ground	A	H	H	A	A	H	H	A	A	A	H	H	A	H	A	H	A	H	H	H	H	A	A	A	H	A	A	H	A	A	H	A	H	A	A	H	H	H	A	H	A	H
Result	D	W	W	L	D	D	W	L	W	L	W	L	L	D	D	D	W	D	D	W	W	L	D	W	W	L	D	L	L	L	W	W	L	L	W	D	D	W	L	L	L	D
Position	8	4	4	4	8	7	4	8	6	9	8	9	11	12	12	13	10	10	10	7	5	8	9	8	5	6	6	9	9	11	10	8	10	10	9	8	8	7	8	9	10	12

Updated to match(es) played on 1 May 1948. Source: statto.com
A = Away; H = Home; W = Win; D = Draw; L = Loss

== Fixtures and results ==
=== Third Division South ===
Date	Opponents	Venue	Result	Scorers	Attendance
23 Aug 1947	Reading	A	0–0		13,890
28 Aug 1947	Bristol City	H	1–0	Batty	16,565
30 Aug 1947	Walsall	H	4–2	Carr 3, Roffi	13,591
3 Sep 1947	Bristol City	A	0–1		25,706
6 Sep 1947	Leyton Orient	A	2–2	Williams, Mogford	14,407
11 Sep 1947	Bournemouth & Boscombe Athletic	H	2–2	Williams, Mogford	13,977
13 Sep 1947	Exeter City	H	3–0	Williams 2, Harper	13,185
17 Sep 1947	Bournemouth & Boscombe Athletic	A	0–5		17,391
20 Sep 1947	Swindon Town	A	2–1	Shergold, Mogford	18,642
27 Sep 1947	Southend United	A	0–1		11,447
4 Oct 1947	Notts County	H	3–1	Williams, Mogford, Emmanuel	14,015
11 Oct 1947	Torquay United	H	0–1		11,933
18 Oct 1947	Crystal Palace	A	1–2	Williams	16,353
25 Oct 1947	Aldershot	H	2–2	Mogford, Emmanuel	11,506
1 Nov 1947	Northampton Town	A	1–1	Allen	9,289
8 Nov 1947	Bristol Rovers	H	2–2	Emmanuel 2	12,877
15 Nov 1947	Norwich City	A	2–1	Roffi, Allen	16,072
22 Nov 1947	Brighton & Hove Albion	H	1–1	McBlain	5,817
6 Dec 1947	Queens Park Rangers	H	0–0		13,230
20 Dec 1947	Reading	H	2–0	Carr, Emmanuel	10,161
25 Dec 1947	Ipswich Town	H	3–1	Carr 2, W.Lewis	12,308
27 Dec 1947	Ipswich Town	A	0–3		11,880
3 Jan 1948	Walsall	A	1–1	Carr	16,847
10 Jan 1948	Watford	A	2–1	Allen, Harper	7,427
17 Jan 1948	Leyton Orient	H	3–2	Carr 2, Allen	10,255
24 Jan 1948	Port Vale	A	1–4	Roffi	10,816
31 Jan 1948	Exeter City	A	4–4	W.Lewis 2, Williams, OG	9,711
14 Feb 1948	Southend United	H	1–5	Carr	10,640
21 Feb 1948	Notts County	A	1–4	Hayward	17,762
28 Feb 1948	Torquay United	A	1–4	Hayward	6,235
6 Mar 1948	Crystal Palace	H	3–1	W.Lewis 2, Allen	8,732
13 Mar 1948	Aldershot	A	2–1	Roffi, Shergold	5,792
20 Mar 1948	Northampton Town	H	1–2	Allen	8,567
26 Mar 1948	Swansea Town	A	0–3		21,861
27 Mar 1948	Bristol Rovers	A	3–2	Allen 2, Emmanuel	13,607
29 Mar 1948	Swansea Town	H	1–1	W.Lewis	15,134
3 Apr 1948	Norwich City	H	1–1	Williams	8,929
8 Apr 1948	Swindon Town	H	2–0	Williams, Emmanuel	7,421
10 Apr 1948	Brighton & Hove Albion	A	0–3		14,247
17 Apr 1948	Watford	H	3–4	Williams, Roffi, Shergold	8,878
24 Apr 1948	Queens Park Rangers	A	0–1		20,905
1 May 1948	Port Vale	H	0–0		8,309

=== FA Cup ===
Round	Date	Opponents	Venue	Result	Scorers	Attendance
1	29 Nov 1947	Southend United	H	3–2	Roffi, Lewis, Allen	11,050
2	13 Dec 1947	Reading	A	0–3		16,000

=== Welsh Cup ===
Round	Date	Opponents	Venue	Result	Scorers	Attendance
5	15 Jan 1948	Merthyr Tydfil	A	1–3	Carr	6,000

== League table ==
Pos	Team	Pld	W	D	L	GF	GA	GAv	Pts
10	Reading	42	15	11	16	56	58	0.966	41
11	Exeter City	42	15	11	16	55	63	0.873	41
12	Newport County	42	14	13	15	61	73	0.836	41
13	Crystal Palace	42	13	13	16	49	49	1.000	39
14	Northampton Town	42	14	11	17	58	72	0.806	39
