= 1930–31 Newport County A.F.C. season =

Welsh association football club season

Newport County
1930–31 season
- Manager: Jimmy Hindmarsh
- Stadium: Somerton Park
- Third Division South: 21st (not re-elected)
- FA Cup: 2nd round
- Welsh Cup: 5th round
- Top goalscorer: League: Pearce (21); All: Pearce (26)
- Highest home attendance: 5,245 vs Notts County (18 October 1930)
- Lowest home attendance: 1,116 vs Norwich City (18 December 1930)
- Average home league attendance: 2,880
Home colours	Away colours

The 1930–31 season was Newport County's 11th season in the Football League. The club finished in 21st place and were not re-elected for the following season.

== Season review ==
=== Results summary ===
Overall								Home						Away					
Pld	W	D	L	GF	GA	GAv	Pts	W	D	L	GF	GA	Pts	W	D	L	GF	GA	Pts
42	11	6	25	69	111	0.622	28	10	5	6	45	31	25	1	1	19	24	80	3

Source: rsssf.com

=== Results by round ===
Round	1	2	3	4	5	6	7	8	9	10	11	12	13	14	15	16	17	18	19	20	21	22	23	24	25	26	27	28	29	30	31	32	33	34	35	36	37	38	39	40	41	42
Ground	H	A	A	A	H	H	A	H	A	H	H	A	H	A	H	A	A	H	A	H	A	A	H	A	H	H	A	H	A	A	H	A	H	A	H	A	A	H	H	A	H	H
Result	W	L	L	L	L	L	L	W	L	D	L	L	W	D	L	L	L	W	L	W	L	L	W	L	D	W	L	W	L	L	L	L	W	W	D	L	L	W	L	L	D	D
Position	5	14	18	21	22	22	22	22	22	21	21	22	21	20	21	21	22	20	22	21	22	22	21	22	21	20	20	20	20	22	22	22	21	21	21	21	22	21	21	22	22	21

Updated to match(es) played on 2 May 1931. Source: statto.com
A = Away; H = Home; W = Win; D = Draw; L = Loss

== Fixtures and results ==
=== Third Division South ===
Date	Opponents	Venue	Result	Scorers	Attendance
30 Aug 1930	Torquay United	H	2–1	Riley, Mason	3,905
3 Sep 1930	Clapton Orient	A	1–3	Welsh	5,505
6 Sep 1930	Northampton Town	A	0–1		13,239
10 Sep 1930	Gillingham	A	1–4	Thomas	3,181
13 Sep 1930	Brentford	H	0–2		2,758
15 Sep 1930	Gillingham	H	1–3	Wheeler	3,181
20 Sep 1930	Crystal Palace	A	1–7	Davies	12,625
27 Sep 1930	Southend United	H	3–1	Davies 2, Thomas	2,711
4 Oct 1930	Luton Town	A	1–3	Gittins	8,097
11 Oct 1930	Bristol Rovers	H	1–1	Seymour	3,951
18 Oct 1930	Notts County	H	2–3	Seymour 2	5,245
25 Oct 1930	Watford	A	2–6	Pearce 2	6,214
1 Nov 1930	Bournemouth & Boscombe Athletic	H	7–3	Seymour 3, Pearce 3, Davies	2,827
8 Nov 1930	Swindon Town	A	4–4	Pearce 2, Hickie, Davies	4,808
15 Nov 1930	Fulham	H	1–3	Pearce	4,082
22 Nov 1930	Coventry City	A	4–6	Pearce 2, Hickie, Gittins	8,276
6 Dec 1930	Queens Park Rangers	A	1–7	Davies	6,566
18 Dec 1930	Norwich City	H	3–0	Pearce 2, Gittins	1,116
20 Dec 1930	Thames	A	1–3	Pearce	816
25 Dec 1930	Exeter City	H	4–0	Pearce 2, Gittins, Davies	3,264
26 Dec 1930	Exeter City	A	0–3		9,548
27 Dec 1930	Torquay United	A	0–3		4,561
3 Jan 1931	Northampton Town	H	5–2	Pearce 2, Gittins, Brown, Bagley	2,977
17 Jan 1931	Brentford	A	2–3	Brown, Thomas	7,170
22 Jan 1931	Walsall	H	1–1	Witton	2,125
26 Jan 1931	Crystal Palace	H	2–1	Gittins 2	1,967
31 Jan 1931	Southend United	A	2–6	Witton 2	5,506
7 Feb 1931	Luton Town	H	3–1	Glidden 2, Witton	2,826
14 Feb 1931	Bristol Rovers	A	0–2		8,160
21 Feb 1931	Notts County	A	0–5		11,913
28 Feb 1931	Watford	H	0–2		2,310
7 Mar 1931	Bournemouth & Boscombe Athletic	A	2–4	Seymour, Brown	3,091
14 Mar 1931	Swindon Town	H	3–1	Gittins 2, Pearce	2,872
21 Mar 1931	Fulham	A	1–0	Gittins	10,124
28 Mar 1931	Coventry City	H	1–1	Gittins	2,950
3 Apr 1931	Brighton & Hove Albion	A	0–5		5,992
4 Apr 1931	Walsall	A	0–1		3,321
6 Apr 1931	Brighton & Hove Albion	H	2–0	Gittins, Thomas	3,346
11 Apr 1931	Queens Park Rangers	H	2–3	Pearce 2	2,899
18 Apr 1931	Norwich City	A	1–4	Pearce	4,563
25 Apr 1931	Thames	H	1–1	Bagley	1,309
2 May 1931	Clapton Orient	H	1–1	Gittins	1,873

=== FA Cup ===
Round	Date	Opponents	Venue	Result	Scorers	Attendance
1	29 Nov 1930	Dulwich Hamlet	A	2–2	Pearce 2	7,500
1r	4 Dec 1930	Dulwich Hamlet	H	4–1	Davies, Pearce, Brown, Bagley	4,500
2	13 Dec 1930	Walsall	A	0–4		7,676

=== Welsh Cup ===
Round	Date	Opponents	Venue	Result	Scorers	Attendance
5	26 Feb 1931	Shrewsbury Town	A	2–5	Pearce 2	3,000

== League table ==
Pos	Team	Pld	W	D	L	F	A	GA	Pts
1	Notts County	42	24	11	7	97	46	2.109	59
2	Crystal Palace	42	22	7	13	107	71	1.507	51
3	Brentford	42	22	6	14	90	64	1.406	50
4	Brighton & Hove Albion	42	17	15	10	68	53	1.283	49
5	Southend United	42	22	5	15	76	60	1.267	49
6	Northampton Town	42	18	12	12	77	59	1.305	48
7	Luton Town	42	19	8	15	76	51	1.490	46
8	Queens Park Rangers	42	20	3	19	82	75	1.093	43
9	Fulham	42	18	7	17	77	75	1.027	43
10	Bournemouth & Boscombe Athletic	42	15	13	14	72	73	0.986	43
11	Torquay United	42	17	9	16	80	84	0.952	43
12	Swindon Town	42	18	6	18	89	94	0.947	42
13	Exeter City	42	17	8	17	84	90	0.933	42
14	Coventry City	42	16	9	17	75	65	1.154	41
15	Bristol Rovers	42	16	8	18	75	92	0.815	40
16	Gillingham	42	14	10	18	61	76	0.803	38
17	Walsall	42	14	9	19	78	95	0.821	37
18	Watford	42	14	7	21	72	75	0.960	35
19	Clapton Orient	42	14	7	21	63	91	0.692	35
20	Thames	42	13	8	21	54	93	0.581	34
21	Newport County	42	11	6	25	69	111	0.622	28
22	Norwich City	42	10	8	24	47	76	0.618	28

Pld = Matches played; W = Matches won; D = Matches drawn; L = Matches lost; F = Goals for; A = Goals against;
GA = Goal average; Pts = Points

Key	
	Division Champions
	Re-elected
	Failed re-election

=== Election ===
Votes	Club	Fate
38	Norwich City	Re-elected to the League
25	Mansfield Town	Elected to the League
19	Newport County	Not re-elected to the League
14	Aldershot	Not elected to the League
2	Merthyr Town	Not elected to the League
0	Llanelly	Not elected to the League
