= 1945–46 Newport County A.F.C. season =

Welsh association football club season

Newport County
1945–46 season
- Manager: Billy McCandless (until 9 Apr 1946); Tom Bromilow (after 9 Apr 1946)
- Stadium: Somerton Park
- Football League South: N/A
- FA Cup: Third round
- Top goalscorer: League: Derrick/Leamon (12); All: Derrick (17)
- Highest home attendance: 15,339 vs Wolverhampton Wanderers (9 March 1946)
- Lowest home attendance: 4,449 vs Coventry City (22 November 1945)
- Average home league attendance: 11,213
Home colours	Away colours

The 1945–46 season was Newport County's first full season since the 1938–39 season. The club competed in the Football League South, a temporary division consisting of the half of the First and Second Division teams geographically farthest south.

== Season review ==
=== Results summary ===
Note: Two points for a win

Overall								Home						Away					
Pld	W	D	L	GF	GA	Ave	Pts	W	D	L	GF	GA	Ave	W	D	L	GF	GA	Ave
42	9	2	31	52	125	0.42	20	7	2	12	31	49	0.63	2	0	19	21	76	0.28

Last updated: 4 May 1946.

== Fixtures and results ==
=== Football League South ===
Pos	Team	Pld	W	D	L	GF	GA	GR	Pts
18	Luton Town	42	13	7	22	60	92	0.652	33
19	Portsmouth	42	11	6	25	66	87	0.759	28
20	Leicester City	42	8	7	27	57	101	0.564	23
21	Newport County	42	9	2	31	52	125	0.416	20
22	Plymouth Argyle	42	3	8	31	39	120	0.325	14

Source: rsssf.com and War Hammers II

Date	Opponents	Venue	Result	Scorers	Attendance
25 Aug 1945	Brentford	A	1–2	Derrick	12,079
30 Aug 1945	Fulham	H	1–5	Wilkins	7,538
1 Sep 1945	Brentford	H	0–5		8,769
8 Sep 1945	Chelsea	H	1–3	Derrick	11,677
13 Sep 1945	Charlton Athletic	H	2–1	Derrick, Wilkins	6,958
15 Sep 1945	Chelsea	A	0–2		20,685
22 Sep 1945	Millwall	A	0–4		16,159
29 Sep 1945	Millwall	H	3–1	Derrick 2, Wilkins	12,735
6 Oct 1945	Southampton	A	2–6	Derrick, E.Brinton	14,483
13 Oct 1945	Southampton	H	0–0		14,089
20 Oct 1945	Derby County	A	1–4	E.Brinton	16,688
27 Oct 1945	Derby County	H	1–4	W.M.Owen	13,118
3 Nov 1945	Leicester City	H	2–0	Derrick 2	10,045
10 Nov 1945	Leicester City	A	0–2		11,659
15 Nov 1945	Coventry City	A	1–7	Newcombe	3,146
22 Nov 1945	Coventry City	H	1–3	Derrick	4,449
1 Dec 1945	Luton Town	H	4–0	Derrick 3, Wookey	6,553
19 Dec 1945	Aston Villa	A	2–5	Carr 2	12,844
22 Dec 1945	Aston Villa	H	0–4		15,119
25 Dec 1945	Arsenal	H	1–2	Avery	13,003
26 Dec 1945	Arsenal	A	0–7		16,536
29 Dec 1945	Charlton Athletic	A	0–2		17,173
12 Jan 1946	Plymouth Argyle	A	3–0	Carr, Granville, Leamon	18,060
19 Jan 1946	Plymouth Argyle	H	2–1	Batty, Leamon	8,179
26 Jan 1946	Portsmouth	H	4–2	Leamon 2, Wookey, Batty	8,632
2 Feb 1946	Portsmouth	A	3–2	Leamon 2, Batty	10,261
16 Feb 1946	Nottingham Forest	H	2–4	Leamon, Carr	11,678
23 Feb 1946	Swansea Town	H	3–1	Leamon 2, Carr	13,415
2 Mar 1946	Swansea Town	A	0–3		19,485
9 Mar 1946	Wolverhampton Wanderers	H	1–3	Batty	15,339
16 Mar 1946	Wolverhampton Wanderers	A	2–5	Granville, Leamon	26,233
23 Mar 1946	West Ham United	A	1–4	Granville	12,000
30 Mar 1946	West Ham United	H	2–2	Leamon 2	13,000
6 Apr 1946	West Bromwich Albion	H	0–3		14,014
13 Apr 1946	West Bromwich Albion	A	0–6		18,690
19 Apr 1946	Birmingham City	A	2–3	Mogford, Carr	14,220
20 Apr 1946	Tottenham Hotspur	H	1–4	Granville	13,766
22 Apr 1946	Birmingham City	H	0–1		13,410
23 Apr 1946	Nottingham Forest	A	2–7	Lucas 2	7,726
27 Apr 1946	Tottenham Hotspur	A	0–1		15,223
1 May 1946	Luton Town	A	0–1		9,000
4 May 1946	Fulham	A	1–3	Rawcliffe	15,000

=== FA Cup ===
Round	Date	Opponents	Venue	Result	Scorers	Attendance	Aggregate
1–1	17 Nov 1945	Torquay United	A	1–0	Derrick	4,000	
1–2	24 Nov 1945	Torquay United	H	1–1	Derrick	7,178	2–1
2–1	8 Dec 1945	Exeter City	H	5–1	Derrick 2, E.Brinton, Carr, Wookey	5,606	
2–2	15 Dec 1945	Exeter City	A	3–1	Hydes 2, Wilkins	9,000	8–2
3–1	5 Jan 1946	Southampton	A	3–4	Derrick, Wookey, Granville	22,000	
3–2	10 Jan 1946	Southampton	H	1–2	W.M.Owen	8,509	4–6
