= 1939–40 Newport County A.F.C. season =

Welsh association football club season

Newport County
1939–40 season
- Manager: Billy McCandless
- Stadium: Somerton Park
- Second Division: Joint 10th (season abandoned)
- Welsh Cup: Semifinal
- Top goalscorer: League: A.J.E. Hydes (3); All: W. Robbins (22)
- Highest home attendance: 19,700 vs Tottenham Hotspur (31 August 1939)
- Lowest home attendance: 13,810 vs Southampton (26 August 1939)
- Average home league attendance: 16,755 (Football League)
Home colours	Away colours

The 1939–40 season would have been Newport County's first season in the Football League Second Division and their 19th season overall in the Football League. However, due to the outbreak of war in Europe in September 1939, the league season was abandoned after just three games and the results expunged from the records. For this reason, appearances made and goals scored in the Football League matches that were played do not contribute to a player's overall appearances and goals record.

Many of Newport County's players went off to fight in the war, but for those who remained, the Football League organised a special War League. The War League was originally split into ten regional divisions (Newport County were placed in the South-Western Division), in accordance with the Government's 50-mile travel limit. A War League Cup was also set up to replace the FA Cup, which had also been interrupted at the preliminary round phase.

== Fixtures and results ==
=== Second Division ===
Date	Opponents	Venue	Result	Scorers	Attendance
Sat 26 Aug 1939	Southampton	H	3–1	Hydes (2), Hickman	13,810
Thu 31 Aug 1939	Tottenham Hotspur	H	1–1	Hickman	19,700
Sat 2 Sep 1939	Nottingham Forest	A	1–2	Hydes	9,521

=== War League (South-West) ===
Date	Opponents	Venue	Result	Scorers	Attendance
21 Oct 1939	Swindon Town	H	0–2		1,824
28 Oct 1939	Bristol Rovers	A	3–2	Carr 2, Robbins	1,186
4 Nov 1939	Swansea Town	A	2–1	Carr, Robbins	3,000
11 Nov 1939	Torquay United	H	1–0	Robbins	802
25 Nov 1939	Cardiff City	H	3–1	Robbins 3	2,228
2 Dec 1939	Plymouth Argyle	A	0–2		3,500
9 Dec 1939	Swindon Town	A	1–2		3,145
16 Dec 1939	Bristol Rovers	H	0–1		1,752
23 Dec 1939	Swansea Town	H	2–2	Brinton, Hydes	1,000
25 Dec 1939	Bristol City	H	1–1	Robbins	2,100
26 Dec 1939	Bristol City	A	3–1	Robbins 2, Carr	2,763
30 Dec 1939	Torquay United	A	2–6	Wookey, Carr	1,000
13 Jan 1940	Cardiff City	A	0–1		4,000
10 Feb 1940	Swansea Town	A	2–2	Robbins, Higgins	3,000
24 Feb 1940	Bristol City	A	2–6	Morgan (OG), Roberts (OG)	1,799
9 Mar 1940	Plymouth Argyle	A	0–3		3,800
16 Mar 1940	Swindon Town	A	3–3	Wookey, Robbins, Appleby	3,182
22 Mar 1940	Bristol Rovers	A	5–3	Wookey 2, Carr, Robbins, Appleby	3,240
25 Mar 1940	Bristol Rovers	H	0–2		4,179
30 Mar 1940	Swansea Town	H	1–5	Brinton	1,200
6 Apr 1940	Torquay United	A	3–4	Brinton, Robbins, Appleby	1,515
4 May 1940	Bristol City	H	4–1	Brinton, Mogford, Robbins, Appleby	2,000
13 May 1940	Cardiff City	A	1–4	Robbins	2,000
18 May 1940	Swindon Town	H	5–2	Wookey 2, W.M. Owen, W.E. Owen, Appleby	600
25 May 1940	Cardiff City	H	4–1	Appleby 2, Wookey, Ballsom (OG)	600
1 Jun 1940	Torquay United	H	11–0	Appleby 4, W.E. Owen 4, Wookey, Newall, Lawrence	500
7 Jun 1940	Plymouth Argyle	H	6–3	Appleby 2, W.M. Owen, Lawrence, Wookey, Anthony (OG)	—
8 Jun 1940	Plymouth Argyle	H	5–2	Appleby 3, Webb, Newall	—

=== War League Cup (South-West) ===
Date	Opponents	Venue	Result	Scorers	Attendance
20 Apr 1940	Birmingham	H	2–2	Robbins, Egan	4,500
27 Apr 1940	Birmingham	A	2–5	Brinton, Wookey	6,700

=== Welsh Cup ===
Round	Date	Opponents	Venue	Result	Scorers	Attendance
5	14 Dec 1939	Lovells Athletic	H	1–1	Higgins	—
5r	4 Jan 1940	Lovells Athletic	A	2–0	Robbins, Higgins	—
6	3 Feb 1940	Barry Town	A	3–2	Hydes 2, Brinton	—
7	2 Mar 1940	Cardiff City	A	1–1	Newall	3,000
7r	18 Mar 1940	Cardiff City	H	5–0	Robbins 2, W.M.Owen, Wookey, Appleby	800
SF	13 Apr 1940	Swansea Town	A	0–1		—

== League table ==
Pos	Team	Pld	W	D	L	F	A	GA	GD	Pts
1	Luton Town	3	2	1	0	7	1	7.000	+6	5
2	Birmingham	3	2	1	0	5	1	5.000	+4	5
3	Leicester City	3	2	0	1	5	2	2.500	+3	4
4	Coventry City	3	1	2	0	8	6	1.333	+2	4
5	Plymouth Argyle	3	2	0	1	4	3	1.333	+1	4
6	West Ham United	3	2	0	1	5	4	1.250	+1	4
7	Tottenham Hotspur	3	1	2	0	6	5	1.200	+1	4
8	Nottingham Forest	3	2	0	1	5	5	1.000	±0	4
9	Manchester City	3	1	1	1	4	3	1.333	+1	3
10	Millwall	3	1	1	1	5	4	1.250	+1	3
10	Newport County	3	1	1	1	5	4	1.250	+1	3
12	West Bromwich Albion	3	1	1	1	8	8	1.000	±0	3
13	Bury	3	1	1	1	4	5	0.800	–1	3
14	Newcastle United	3	1	0	2	8	6	1.333	+2	2
15	Chesterfield	2	1	0	1	2	2	1.000	±0	2
16	Barnsley	3	1	0	2	7	8	0.875	–1	2
17	Southampton	3	1	0	2	5	6	0.833	–1	2
18	Sheffield Wednesday	3	1	0	2	3	5	0.600	–2	2
19	Swansea Town	3	1	0	2	5	11	0.455	–6	2
20	Fulham	3	0	1	2	3	6	0.500	–3	1
21	Burnley	2	0	1	1	1	3	0.333	–2	1
22	Bradford Park Avenue	3	0	1	2	2	7	0.286	–5	1

Pld = Matches played; W = Matches won; D = Matches drawn; L = Matches lost; F = Goals for; A = Goals against;
GA = Goal average; GD = Goal difference; Pts = Points

== Sources ==
- Amber in the Blood: History of Newport County F.C. ISBN 1-874427-40-2
