= 1982–83 Newport County A.F.C. season =

Welsh association football club season

Newport County
1982–83 season
- Chairman: Richard Ford
- Manager: Colin Addison
- Stadium: Somerton Park
- Third Division: 4th
- FA Cup: 3rd round
- League Cup: 2nd round
- League Trophy: Quarter-final
- Welsh Cup: 4th round
- Top goalscorer: League: Tynan (25); All: Tynan (33)
- Highest home attendance: 16,052 vs Cardiff City (4 April 1983)
- Lowest home attendance: 2,317 vs Preston North End (15 February 1983)
- Average home league attendance: 4,710
Home colours	Away colours

The 1982–83 season was Newport County's third consecutive season in the Third Division and their 55th season overall in the Football League. County achieved their highest post-war league finish, just four points behind third-placed Huddersfield Town in the Third Division. Huddersfield were promoted to the Second Division, along with champions Portsmouth and arch-rivals Cardiff City. County had actually gone top of the table on Easter Monday after a win over Cardiff in front of 16,052 fans at Somerton Park, but only one win and four defeats from the next five games set up the away game at Huddersfield as the promotion decider. That game too was lost, and with it the chance of a return to the Second Division for the first time since 1947.

== Season review ==
=== Results summary ===
Note: Three points for a win

Overall								Home						Away					
Pld	W	D	L	GF	GA	GD	Pts	W	D	L	GF	GA	GD	W	D	L	GF	GA	GD
46	23	9	14	76	54	+22	78	13	7	3	40	20	+20	10	2	11	36	34	+2

Last updated: 14 May 1983.

=== Results by round ===
Round	1	2	3	4	5	6	7	8	9	10	11	12	13	14	15	16	17	18	19	20	21	22	23	24	25	26	27	28	29	30	31	32	33	34	35	36	37	38	39	40	41	42	43	44	45	46
Ground	A	H	H	A	H	A	A	H	H	A	A	H	A	H	A	H	A	H	H	A	H	A	H	H	A	H	A	H	H	A	H	A	A	H	H	A	A	A	H	A	H	A	H	A	A	H
Result	D	W	D	L	W	W	L	W	W	W	D	D	W	W	L	W	L	W	D	L	L	W	D	L	W	D	L	D	W	W	W	L	W	W	W	W	W	W	W	L	L	L	W	L	L	D
Position	13	5	9	13	9	6	9	8	4	3	3	5	3	2	3	2	3	3	4	6	7	7	6	7	7	7	7	7	6	6	6	6	4	6	5	2	2	2	1	1	3	4	4	4	4	4

Updated to match(es) played on 14 May 1983. Source: statto.com
A = Away; H = Home; W = Win; D = Draw; L = Loss

== Fixtures and results ==
=== Third Division ===
Date	Opponents	Venue	Result	Scorers	Attendance
28 Aug 1982	Doncaster Rovers	A	0–0		3,471
4 Sep 1982	Chesterfield	H	1–0	Tynan	3,464
7 Sep 1982	Plymouth Argyle	H	2–2	Tynan, Gwyther	3,741
11 Sep 1982	Bradford City	A	2–4	Aldridge, Tynan	4,793
18 Sep 1982	Huddersfield Town	H	2–1	Aldridge 2	3,536
25 Sep 1982	Portsmouth	A	2–1	Vaughan, Aldridge	10,833
28 Sep 1982	Brentford	A	0–2		5,706
2 Oct 1982	Lincoln City	H	1–0	Tynan	3,749
9 Oct 1982	Bristol Rovers	H	2–0	Vaughan, Tynan	5,912
16 Oct 1982	Orient	A	5–1	Tynan 2, Elsey, Aldridge, Lowndes	2,040
19 Oct 1982	Preston North End	A	0–0		3,747
23 Oct 1982	Southend United	H	1–1	Oakes	4,338
30 Oct 1982	Wigan Athletic	A	1–0	Aldridge	4,108
2 Nov 1982	Sheffield United	H	3–1	Aldridge, OG, Tynan	5,017
6 Nov 1982	Reading	A	2–4	Bailey, Tynan	3,058
13 Nov 1982	Bournemouth	H	5–1	Aldridge 3, Vaughan, Lowndes	4,071
27 Nov 1982	Wrexham	A	0–1		3,246
4 Dec 1982	Gillingham	H	2–1	Elsey, Lowndes	3,727
18 Dec 1982	Walsall	H	1–1	Vaughan	3,572
27 Dec 1982	Cardiff City	A	2–3	Bailey, Vaughan	15,972
28 Dec 1982	Oxford United	H	1–2	Tynan	5,836
1 Jan 1983	Exeter City	A	1–0	Elsey	3,505
3 Jan 1983	Millwall	H	2–2	Gwyther, Elsey	4,017
15 Jan 1983	Doncaster Rovers	H	1–2	Aldridge	3,482
22 Jan 1983	Plymouth Argyle	A	4–2	Tynan 2, Elsey, Lowndes	4,287
29 Jan 1983	Bradford City	H	1–1	Bailey	3,398
1 Feb 1983	Chesterfield	A	1–3	Tynan	1,645
6 Feb 1983	Brentford	H	0–0		3,401
15 Feb 1983	Preston North End	H	3–0	Tynan 2, Relish	2,317
19 Feb 1983	Bristol Rovers	A	3–1	Tynan 2, Aldridge	6,812
26 Feb 1983	Orient	H	4–1	Lowndes 3, Aldridge	3,202
1 Mar 1983	Sheffield United	A	0–2		8,704
4 Mar 1983	Southend United	A	4–1	Bailey, Vaughan, Lowndes, Aldridge	2,476
12 Mar 1983	Wigan Athletic	H	1–0	Aldridge	3,647
19 Mar 1983	Reading	H	1–0	Tynan	3,588
23 Mar 1983	Lincoln City	A	4–1	Tynan 2, Lowndes 2	4,742
26 Mar 1983	Bournemouth	A	1–0	Vaughan	9,121
2 Apr 1983	Oxford United	A	3–0	Tynan, Lowndes, Aldridge	6,640
4 Apr 1983	Cardiff City	H	1–0	Aldridge	16,052
9 Apr 1983	Gillingham	A	0–2		4,265
16 Apr 1983	Portsmouth	H	0–3		10,419
23 Apr 1983	Walsall	A	1–2	Tynan	5,141
30 Apr 1983	Wrexham	H	4–0	Tynan 3, Lowndes	4,344
2 May 1983	Millwall	A	0–3		5,515
7 May 1983	Huddersfield Town	A	0–1		16,509
14 May 1983	Exeter City	H	1–1	Williams	3,520

=== FA Cup ===
Round	Date	Opponents	Venue	Result	Scorers	Attendance
1	20 Nov 1982	Enfield	A	0–0		2,541
1r	23 Nov 1982	Enfield	H	4–2	Tynan 3, Aldridge	4,014
2	11 Dec 1982	Orient	H	1–0	Tynan (P)	4,013
3	8 Jan 1983	Everton	H	1–1	Gwyther	9,527
3r	11 Jan 1983	Everton	A	1–2	Aldridge	18,565

=== Football League Cup ===
Round	Date	Opponents	Venue	Result	Scorers	Attendance	Notes
1–1	1 Sep 1982	Exeter City	A	2–1	Lowndes, Gwyther	2,292	
1–2	14 Sep 1982	Exeter City	H	6–0	Vaughan 2, Lowndes, Aldridge, Tynan, Elsey	2,684	8–1 agg
2–1	5 Oct 1982	Everton	H	0–2		8,293	
2–2	27 Oct 1982	Everton	A	2–2	Tynan 38', Oakes 53'	8,941	2–4 agg

=== Football League Trophy ===
Round	Date	Opponents	Venue	Result	Scorers	Attendance	Notes
Grp 8	14 Aug 1982	Torquay United	H	0–1			
Grp 8	18 Aug 1982	Exeter City	H	5–1			
Grp 8	21 Aug 1982	Bristol City	A	4–1			
QF	26 Jan 1983	Chester	A	0–0 a.e.t.			Lost on penalties

=== Welsh Cup ===
Round	Date	Opponents	Venue	Result	Scorers	Attendance
3	30 Nov 1982	Cardiff City	H	1–0	Vaughan	7,800
4	19 Jan 1983	Wrexham	A	1–4	Aldridge	1,825

=== League table ===
Pos	Team	Pld	W	D	L	GF	GA	GD	Pts	Promotion or relegation
2	Cardiff City (P)	46	25	11	10	76	50	+26	86	Promotion to the Second Division
3	Huddersfield Town (P)	46	23	13	10	84	49	+35	82	Promotion to the Second Division
4	Newport County	46	23	9	14	76	54	+22	78	
5	Oxford United	46	22	12	12	71	53	+18	78	
6	Lincoln City	46	23	7	16	77	51	+26	76	

(P) Promoted
