= 1972–73 Newport County A.F.C. season =

Welsh association football club season

Newport County
1972–73 season
- Manager: Billy Lucas
- Stadium: Somerton Park
- Fourth Division: 5th
- FA Cup: 3rd round
- League Cup: 2nd round
- Welsh Cup: 5th round
- Top goalscorer: League: Brown (16); All: Brown (24)
- Highest home attendance: 11,350 vs Cardiff City (Welsh Cup, 20 February 1973)
- Lowest home attendance: 2,843 vs Lincoln City (16 December 1972)
- Average home league attendance: 4,810
| Home colours | Away colours |

The 1972–73 season was Newport County's 11th consecutive season in the Football League Fourth Division since relegation at the end of the 1961–62 season and their 45th overall in the Football League. County missed out on promotion by the narrowest of margins: their goal average of 1.46 being inferior to that of Aldershot's 1.58 – both teams having finished level on points.

== Season review ==
=== Results summary ===
| Overall | | | | | | | | Home | | | | | | Away | | | | | |
| Pld | W | D | L | GF | GA | GAv | Pts | W | D | L | GF | GA | Pts | W | D | L | GF | GA | Pts |
|---|---|---|---|---|---|---|---|---|---|---|---|---|---|---|---|---|---|---|---|
| 46 | 22 | 12 | 12 | 64 | 44 | 1.455 | 56 | 14 | 6 | 3 | 37 | 18 | 34 | 8 | 6 | 9 | 27 | 26 | 22 |

Source: rsssf.com

=== Results by round ===
| Round | 1 | 2 | 3 | 4 | 5 | 6 | 7 | 8 | 9 | 10 | 11 | 12 | 13 | 14 | 15 | 16 | 17 | 18 | 19 | 20 | 21 | 22 | 23 | 24 | 25 | 26 | 27 | 28 | 29 | 30 | 31 | 32 | 33 | 34 | 35 | 36 | 37 | 38 | 39 | 40 | 41 | 42 | 43 | 44 | 45 | 46 |
|---|---|---|---|---|---|---|---|---|---|---|---|---|---|---|---|---|---|---|---|---|---|---|---|---|---|---|---|---|---|---|---|---|---|---|---|---|---|---|---|---|---|---|---|---|---|---|
| Ground | A | H | A | A | H | A | H | H | A | A | H | H | A | A | H | H | A | H | A | A | H | H | A | H | A | H | H | A | H | A | H | A | A | H | H | A | A | H | A | H | A | H | A | A | H | H |
| Result | D | W | W | D | L | D | L | D | L | W | W | W | L | W | W | W | D | W | L | L | L | D | L | W | W | W | W | W | D | L | W | W | W | W | D | L | D | W | D | D | L | D | W | L | W | W |
| Position | 10 | 6 | 4 | 4 | 6 | 6 | 13 | 10 | 15 | 13 | 8 | 8 | 9 | 8 | 7 | 3 | 4 | 4 | 5 | 7 | 7 | 7 | 11 | 8 | 5 | 5 | 5 | 4 | 6 | 7 | 7 | 4 | 3 | 3 | 2 | 5 | 5 | 5 | 4 | 5 | 6 | 6 | 6 | 6 | 6 | 4 |

Updated to match(es) played on 28 Apr 1973. Source: statto.com
A = Away; H = Home; W = Win; D = Draw; L = Loss

== Fixtures and results ==
=== Fourth Division ===
| Date | Opponents | Venue | Result | Scorers | Attendance |
|---|---|---|---|---|---|
| 12 Aug 1972 | Gillingham | A | 0–0 | | 3,719 |
| 19 Aug 1972 | Chester | H | 3–2 | OG, Brown 2 | 3,342 |
| 26 Aug 1972 | Colchester United | A | 3–1 | Coldrick, Hawkins, Thomas | 3,639 |
| 29 Aug 1972 | Bury | A | 0–0 | | 2,834 |
| 2 Sep 1972 | Mansfield Town | H | 0–1 | | 4,813 |
| 9 Sep 1972 | Torquay United | A | 2–2 | Screen, Thomas | 3,693 |
| 16 Sep 1972 | Cambridge United | H | 0–2 | | 3,567 |
| 19 Sep 1972 | Peterborough United | H | 1–1 | Thomas | 3,013 |
| 23 Sep 1972 | Reading | A | 0–5 | | 4,107 |
| 26 Sep 1972 | Northampton Town | A | 1–0 | R.Jones | 4,010 |
| 30 Sep 1972 | Stockport County | H | 1–0 | Brown | 3,012 |
| 7 Oct 1972 | Aldershot | H | 2–1 | OG, R.Jones | 3,504 |
| 11 Oct 1972 | Bradford City | A | 1–2 | Brown | 1,545 |
| 14 Oct 1972 | Darlington | A | 3–2 | OG, Brown 2 | 1,356 |
| 21 Oct 1972 | Hartlepool United | H | 5–1 | R.Jones 2, Brown 2, Aizlewood | 3,389 |
| 24 Oct 1972 | Southport | H | 3–1 | R.Jones 2, Hill | 5,616 |
| 28 Oct 1972 | Exeter City | A | 0–0 | | 4,588 |
| 4 Nov 1972 | Northampton Town | H | 1–0 | White | 4,825 |
| 11 Nov 1972 | Peterborough United | A | 0–1 | | 4,480 |
| 25 Nov 1972 | Barnsley | A | 1–2 | Brown | 2,063 |
| 28 Nov 1972 | Hereford United | H | 0–1 | Redrobe | 8,776 |
| 16 Dec 1972 | Lincoln City | H | 2–2 | Brown, Hooper | 2,843 |
| 23 Dec 1972 | Workington | A | 2–3 | Brown, P.Harris | 1,254 |
| 26 Dec 1972 | Reading | H | 1–0 | Aizlewood | 5,435 |
| 30 Dec 1972 | Chester | A | 2–0 | Brown 2 | 2,844 |
| 6 Jan 1973 | Colchester United | H | 1–0 | Screen | 3,465 |
| 23 Jan 1973 | Torquay United | H | 2–1 | R.Jones 2 | 4,395 |
| 30 Jan 1973 | Southport | A | 2–0 | White, Summerhayes | 4,451 |
| 6 Feb 1973 | Bradford City | H | 0–0 | | 5,795 |
| 10 Feb 1973 | Cambridge United | A | 1–3 | White | 3,496 |
| 17 Feb 1973 | Gillingham | H | 5–1 | OG, R.Jones 2, Hill, Coldrick | 4,235 |
| 24 Feb 1973 | Lincoln City | A | 2–0 | Screen, R.Jones | 3,023 |
| 2 Mar 1973 | Aldershot | A | 2–0 | Screen, Summerhayes | 3,951 |
| 6 Mar 1973 | Doncaster Rovers | H | 1–0 | Brown | 6,674 |
| 9 Mar 1973 | Darlington | H | 0–0 | | 7,625 |
| 16 Mar 1973 | Hartlepool United | A | 0–1 | | 3,649 |
| 21 Mar 1973 | Crewe Alexandra | A | 0–0 | | 1,991 |
| 24 Mar 1973 | Exeter City | H | 2–0 | Brown, Passey | 4,817 |
| 26 Mar 1973 | Mansfield Town | A | 0–0 | | 6,402 |
| 31 Mar 1973 | Barnsley | H | 1–1 | R.Jones | 4,757 |
| 7 Apr 1973 | Hereford United | A | 0–2 | | 14,849 |
| 14 Apr 1973 | Crewe Alexandra | H | 0–0 | | 4,090 |
| 21 Apr 1973 | Doncaster Rovers | A | 5–1 | Screen, D.Jones, Coldrick, Hill, Brown | 1,942 |
| 23 Apr 1973 | Stockport County | A | 0–1 | | 2,785 |
| 24 Apr 1973 | Workington | H | 2–0 | D.Jones, Hill | 5,256 |
| 28 Apr 1973 | Bury | H | 4–3 | Coldrick, Aizlewood, R.Jones, D.Jones | 7,390 |

=== FA Cup ===
| Round | Date | Opponents | Venue | Result | Scorers | Attendance |
|---|---|---|---|---|---|---|
| 1 | 18 Nov 1972 | Alton Town | H | 5–1 | B.Harris 2, Brown, R.Jones, White | 4,692 |
| 2 | 9 Dec 1972 | Torquay United | A | 1–0 | Brown | 3,724 |
| 3 | 13 Jan 1973 | Millwall | A | 0–3 | | 10,122 |

=== Football League Cup ===
| Round | Date | Opponents | Venue | Result | Scorers | Attendance |
|---|---|---|---|---|---|---|
| 1 | 15 Aug 1972 | Swansea City | A | 1–1 | Hill | 3,998 |
| 1r | 22 Aug 1972 | Swansea City | H | 3–0 | Brown 3 | 5,220 |
| 2 | 5 Sep 1972 | Ipswich Town | H | 0–3 | | 9,516 |

=== Welsh Cup ===
| Round | Date | Opponents | Venue | Result | Scorers | Attendance |
|---|---|---|---|---|---|---|
| 4 | 9 Jan 1973 | Swansea City | A | 0–0 | | 2,990 |
| 4r | 16 Jan 1973 | Swansea City | H | 3–0 | Brown 3 | 4,042 |
| 5 | 20 Feb 1973 | Cardiff City | H | 1–3 | Hooper | 11,350 |

== League table ==
| Pos | Team | Pld | W | D | L | GF | GA | GAv | Pts | Promotion or relegation |
|---|---|---|---|---|---|---|---|---|---|---|
| 3 | Cambridge United (P) | 46 | 20 | 17 | 9 | 67 | 57 | 1.175 | 57 | Promotion to the Third Division |
| 4 | Aldershot (P) | 46 | 22 | 12 | 12 | 60 | 38 | 1.579 | 56 | Promotion to the Third Division |
| 5 | Newport County | 46 | 22 | 12 | 12 | 64 | 44 | 1.455 | 56 | |
| 6 | Mansfield Town | 46 | 20 | 14 | 12 | 78 | 51 | 1.529 | 54 | Qualified for the Watney Cup (Note: The two teams who scored the most goals in each division, and did not qualify for Europe and were not promoted, qualified for the Watney Cup.) |
| 7 | Reading | 46 | 17 | 18 | 11 | 51 | 38 | 1.342 | 52 | |

Source: rsssf.com
(P) Promoted
