= 1931–32 Newport County A.F.C. season =

Welsh association football club season

Newport County
1931–32 season
- Manager: Jimmy Hindmarsh
- Stadium: Somerton Park
- Southern League Western Division: 6th
- Welsh Cup: 6th round
- Top goalscorer: League: Peed (24); All: Peed (24)
Home colours	Away colours

The 1931–32 season saw Newport County return to the Southern League following their failure to be re-elected to the Football League. However, after this one season hiatus they were re-elected for the 1932–33 season.

== Season review ==
=== Results summary ===
Note: Two points for a win

Overall								Home						Away					
Pld	W	D	L	GF	GA	Ave	Pts	W	D	L	GF	GA	Ave	W	D	L	GF	GA	Ave
24	10	6	8	70	51	1.37	26	7	3	2	54	19	2.84	2	4	6	16	33	0.48

Last updated: 29 Mar 1932.
Source: []

== Fixtures and results ==
=== Southern League Western Division ===
Date	Opponents	Venue	Result	Scorers	Attendance
29 Aug 1931	Merthyr Town	H	4–2	Peed 2, Thomas, Bagley	
7 Sep 1931	Yeovil & Petters United	H	1–1	Gittins	
17 Sep 1931	Bath City	A	3–3	Peed 2, Brittan	
21 Sep 1931	Llanelly	A	2–2	Peed, Brittan	4,000
26 Sep 1931	Bath City	H	2–2	Thomas, Brittan	
10 Oct 1931	Exeter City reserves	H	1–1	Peed	
17 Oct 1931	Bristol Rovers reserves	A	1–0	Gittins	3,000
24 Oct 1931	Llanelly	H	1–2	Peed	
31 Oct 1931	Taunton Town	A	1–2	Peed	
7 Nov 1931	Ebbw Vale	H	7–2	Gittins 3, Peed 3, Bagley	
21 Nov 1931	Bristol Rovers reserves	H	6–2	Gittins 2, Thomas 2, Peed, W.Clarke	
5 Dec 1931	Swindon Town reserves	H	6–1	S.Jones 2, Gittins, Thomas, Brittan, Bagley	
25 Dec 1931	Barry	A	2–4	Bagley, Brittan	
26 Dec 1931	Barry	H	11–1	Gittins 4, Peed 3, Thomas 2, Bagley	
2 Jan 1932	Merthyr Town	A	3–3	S.Jones	
16 Jan 1932	Taunton Town	H	10–2	Bagley, S.Jones, Gittins	
20 Feb 1932	Exeter City reserves	A	1–3	Peed	3,000
27 Feb 1932	Torquay United reserves	H	3–0		
5 Mar 1932	Torquay United reserves	A	0–6		
19 Mar 1932	Swindon Town reserves	A	0–5		
25 Mar 1932	Plymouth Argyle reserves	A	0–0		
26 Mar 1932	Ebbw Vale	A	3–2	A.Clarke, Brittan	
28 Mar 1932	Plymouth Argyle reserves	H	2–3	Peed, Brittan	
29 Mar 1932	Yeovil & Petters United	A	0–3	Gittins	300

=== Welsh Cup ===
Round	Date	Opponents	Venue	Result	Scorers	Attendance
5	6 Feb 1932	Cardiff Corinthians	H	2–0	Gittins, Bagley	
6	17 Mar 1932	Swansea Town	H	0–0		
6r	4 Apr 1932	Swansea Town	A	0–2		

== League table ==
Pos	Team	Pld	W	D	L	F	A	Pts	Notes
1	Yeovil & Petters United	24	16	4	4	65	31	36	
2	Plymouth Argyle reserves	24	15	5	4	81	31	35	
3	Bath City	24	12	7	5	50	33	31	
4	Llanelly	24	12	4	8	65	46	28	
5	Taunton Town	24	13	2	9	53	58	28	
6	Newport County	24	10	6	8	70	51	26	Elected to Football League
7	Exeter City reserves	24	9	7	8	59	43	25	
8	Merthyr Town	24	9	4	11	66	73	22	
9	Bristol Rovers reserves	24	8	4	12	54	47	20	
10	Swindon Town reserves	24	8	4	12	54	95	20	Resigned
11	Barry	24	7	3	14	58	76	17	
12	Torquay United reserves	24	5	6	13	43	66	16	
13	Ebbw Vale	24	3	2	19	34	102	8	Resigned

=== Election ===
Votes	Club	Fate
41	Gillingham	Re-elected to the League
36	Newport County	Elected to the League
35	Aldershot	Elected to the League
25	Llanelly	Not elected to the League
8	Guildford City	Not elected to the League
2	Merthyr Town	Not elected to the League
