= 1932–33 Newport County A.F.C. season =

Welsh association football club season

Newport County
1932–33 season
- Manager: Jimmy Hindmarsh
- Stadium: Somerton Park
- Third Division South: 21st (re-elected)
- FA Cup: 2nd round
- Welsh Cup: 8th round
- Top goalscorer: League: Gardner/Thomas (12); All: Green (13)
- Highest home attendance: 7,933 vs Cardiff City (4 March 1933)
- Lowest home attendance: 1,769 vs Southend United (9 February 1933)
- Average home league attendance: 4,400
| Home colours | Away colours |

The 1932–33 season saw Newport County return to the Football League following their one-season spell back in the Southern League. The club again finished in the re-election places at the end of the season but this time were re-elected.

== Season review ==
=== Results summary ===
| Overall | | | | | | | | Home | | | | | | Away | | | | | |
| Pld | W | D | L | GF | GA | GAv | Pts | W | D | L | GF | GA | Pts | W | D | L | GF | GA | Pts |
|---|---|---|---|---|---|---|---|---|---|---|---|---|---|---|---|---|---|---|---|
| 42 | 11 | 7 | 24 | 61 | 105 | 0.581 | 29 | 9 | 4 | 8 | 42 | 42 | 22 | 2 | 3 | 16 | 19 | 63 | 7 |

Source: rsssf.com

=== Results by round ===
| Round | 1 | 2 | 3 | 4 | 5 | 6 | 7 | 8 | 9 | 10 | 11 | 12 | 13 | 14 | 15 | 16 | 17 | 18 | 19 | 20 | 21 | 22 | 23 | 24 | 25 | 26 | 27 | 28 | 29 | 30 | 31 | 32 | 33 | 34 | 35 | 36 | 37 | 38 | 39 | 40 | 41 | 42 |
|---|---|---|---|---|---|---|---|---|---|---|---|---|---|---|---|---|---|---|---|---|---|---|---|---|---|---|---|---|---|---|---|---|---|---|---|---|---|---|---|---|---|---|
| Ground | H | A | A | H | H | A | A | H | A | H | A | A | H | A | H | A | A | A | H | H | A | A | H | H | H | A | H | A | H | H | A | H | A | H | A | H | H | A | H | A | H | A |
| Result | L | L | L | L | D | L | L | L | L | D | D | W | D | L | W | D | L | D | L | W | L | L | L | D | W | L | W | L | L | W | L | W | L | L | L | W | W | L | W | W | L | L |
| Position | 20 | 21 | 22 | 22 | 22 | 22 | 22 | 22 | 22 | 22 | 22 | 22 | 22 | 22 | 22 | 22 | 22 | 22 | 22 | 22 | 22 | 22 | 22 | 22 | 22 | 22 | 22 | 22 | 22 | 21 | 21 | 21 | 21 | 22 | 22 | 22 | 21 | 22 | 21 | 19 | 21 | 21 |

Updated to match(es) played on 6 May 1933. Source: statto.com
A = Away; H = Home; W = Win; D = Draw; L = Loss

== Fixtures and results ==
=== Third Division South ===
| Date | Opponents | Venue | Result | Scorers | Attendance |
|---|---|---|---|---|---|
| 27 Aug 1932 | Clapton Orient | H | 0–2 | | 7,805 |
| 31 Aug 1932 | Swindon Town | A | 0–2 | | 5,074 |
| 3 Sep 1932 | Northampton Town | A | 0–8 | | 8,920 |
| 5 Sep 1932 | Swindon Town | H | 1–2 | Weale | 3,674 |
| 10 Sep 1932 | Bristol City | H | 1–1 | Gittins | 6,025 |
| 14 Sep 1932 | Southend United | A | 0–3 | | 5,687 |
| 17 Sep 1932 | Coventry City | A | 1–3 | Green | 12,766 |
| 24 Sep 1932 | Brentford | H | 1–6 | Weale | 7,343 |
| 1 Oct 1932 | Torquay United | A | 0–4 | | 3,960 |
| 8 Oct 1932 | Exeter City | H | 1–1 | Lumley | 5,268 |
| 15 Oct 1932 | Luton Town | A | 2–2 | Rogers, Bagley | 6,504 |
| 22 Oct 1932 | Cardiff City | A | 3–1 | Bagley, Thomas, Peed | 10,163 |
| 29 Oct 1932 | Reading | H | 3–3 | Thomas, Weale, Peed | 5,375 |
| 5 Nov 1932 | Norwich City | A | 1–3 | Thomas | 9,913 |
| 17 Nov 1932 | Brighton & Hove Albion | H | 5–2 | Weale 2, Bagley, Green, Peed | 3,750 |
| 19 Nov 1932 | Bristol Rovers | A | 2–2 | Weale, Peed | 8,910 |
| 3 Dec 1932 | Queens Park Rangers | A | 1–6 | Green | 6,514 |
| 17 Dec 1932 | Crystal Palace | A | 0–0 | | 8,644 |
| 24 Dec 1932 | Gillingham | H | 0–2 | | 4,113 |
| 26 Dec 1932 | Watford | H | 2–0 | Weale, Green | 5,044 |
| 27 Dec 1932 | Watford | A | 2–3 | Green, Armand | 9,131 |
| 31 Dec 1932 | Clapton Orient | A | 1–3 | Thomas | 4,278 |
| 7 Jan 1933 | Northampton Town | H | 0–3 | | 4,217 |
| 14 Jan 1933 | Bournemouth & Boscombe Athletic | H | 1–1 | Bagley | 2,237 |
| 19 Jan 1933 | Aldershot | H | 2–1 | Rogers 2 | 1,902 |
| 21 Jan 1933 | Bristol City | A | 2–3 | Bagley, Weale | 4,800 |
| 28 Jan 1933 | Coventry City | H | 2–1 | Bagley 2 | 3,150 |
| 4 Feb 1933 | Brentford | A | 0–6 | | 10,060 |
| 9 Feb 1933 | Southend United | H | 1–3 | Thomas | 1,769 |
| 11 Feb 1933 | Torquay United | H | 3–1 | Gardner 2, Thomas | 3,098 |
| 18 Feb 1933 | Exeter City | A | 0–4 | | 6,598 |
| 4 Mar 1933 | Cardiff City | H | 4–2 | Gardner 2, Bagley, Green | 7,933 |
| 11 Mar 1933 | Reading | A | 1–4 | Green | 7,742 |
| 18 Mar 1933 | Norwich City | H | 3–4 | Gardner 2, Thomas | 4,490 |
| 25 Mar 1933 | Brighton & Hove Albion | A | 0–1 | | 5,045 |
| 1 Apr 1933 | Bristol Rovers | H | 3–1 | Gardner 2, Thomas | 3,588 |
| 5 Apr 1933 | Luton Town | H | 3–2 | Thomas 2, Gardner | 2,344 |
| 8 Apr 1933 | Aldershot | A | 1–2 | Gardner | 3,340 |
| 15 Apr 1933 | Queens Park Rangers | H | 5–1 | Thomas 2, Green 2, Gardner | 4,120 |
| 17 Apr 1933 | Bournemouth & Boscombe Athletic | A | 2–1 | Collins, Lumley | 5,540 |
| 29 Apr 1933 | Crystal Palace | H | 1–3 | Gardner | 5,168 |
| 6 May 1933 | Gillingham | A | 0–2 | | 5,737 |

=== FA Cup ===
| Round | Date | Opponents | Venue | Result | Scorers | Attendance |
|---|---|---|---|---|---|---|
| 1 | 26 Nov 1932 | Ilford | H | 4–2 | Green 3, Weale | |
| 2 | 10 Dec 1932 | Folkestone | A | 1–2 | Weale | |

=== Welsh Cup ===
| Round | Date | Opponents | Venue | Result | Scorers | Attendance |
|---|---|---|---|---|---|---|
| 7 | 1 Feb 1933 | Bristol City | A | 4–3 | Lumley 3, Green | 800 |
| 8 | 13 Mar 1933 | Southport | H | 0–0 | | 2,000 |
| 8r | 21 Mar 1933 | Southport | A | 0–4 | | |

== League table ==
| Pos | Team | Pld | W | D | L | F | A | GA | Pts |
|---|---|---|---|---|---|---|---|---|---|
| 1 | Brentford | 42 | 26 | 10 | 6 | 90 | 49 | 1.84 | 62 |
| 2 | Exeter City | 42 | 24 | 10 | 8 | 88 | 48 | 1.83 | 58 |
| 3 | Norwich City | 42 | 22 | 13 | 7 | 88 | 55 | 1.60 | 57 |
| 4 | Reading | 42 | 19 | 13 | 10 | 103 | 71 | 1.45 | 51 |
| 5 | Crystal Palace | 42 | 19 | 8 | 15 | 78 | 64 | 1.22 | 46 |
| 6 | Coventry City | 42 | 19 | 6 | 17 | 106 | 77 | 1.38 | 44 |
| 7 | Gillingham | 42 | 18 | 8 | 16 | 72 | 61 | 1.18 | 44 |
| 8 | Northampton Town | 42 | 18 | 8 | 16 | 76 | 66 | 1.15 | 44 |
| 9 | Bristol Rovers | 42 | 15 | 14 | 13 | 61 | 56 | 1.09 | 44 |
| 10 | Torquay United | 42 | 16 | 12 | 14 | 72 | 67 | 1.07 | 44 |
| 11 | Watford | 42 | 16 | 12 | 14 | 66 | 63 | 1.05 | 44 |
| 12 | Brighton & Hove Albion | 42 | 17 | 8 | 17 | 66 | 65 | 1.01 | 42 |
| 13 | Southend United | 42 | 15 | 11 | 16 | 65 | 82 | 0.79 | 41 |
| 14 | Luton Town | 42 | 13 | 13 | 16 | 78 | 78 | 1.00 | 39 |
| 15 | Bristol City | 42 | 12 | 13 | 17 | 83 | 90 | 0.92 | 37 |
| 16 | Queens Park Rangers | 42 | 13 | 11 | 18 | 72 | 87 | 0.83 | 37 |
| 17 | Aldershot | 42 | 13 | 10 | 19 | 61 | 72 | 0.85 | 36 |
| 18 | Bournemouth & Boscombe Athletic | 42 | 12 | 12 | 18 | 60 | 81 | 0.74 | 36 |
| 19 | Cardiff City | 42 | 12 | 7 | 23 | 69 | 99 | 0.70 | 31 |
| 20 | Clapton Orient | 42 | 8 | 13 | 21 | 59 | 93 | 0.63 | 29 |
| 21 | Newport County | 42 | 11 | 7 | 24 | 61 | 105 | 0.58 | 29 |
| 22 | Swindon Town | 42 | 9 | 11 | 22 | 60 | 105 | 0.57 | 29 |

| Key | |
|---|---|
| | Division Champions |
| | Re-elected |
| | Failed re-election |

=== Election ===
| Votes | Club | Fate |
|---|---|---|
| 45 | Swindon Town | Re-elected to the League |
| 26 | Newport County | Re-elected to the League |
| 20 | Llanelly | Not elected to the League |
| 5 | Folkestone | Not elected to the League |
| 1 | Merthyr Town | Not elected to the League |
| 1 | Nuneaton Town | Not elected to the League |
