= 1938–39 Newport County A.F.C. season =

Welsh association football club season

Newport County
1938–39 season
- Manager: Billy McCandless
- Stadium: Somerton Park
- Third Division South: 1st (Promoted as champions)
- FA Cup: 3rd round
- Third Division South Cup: 2nd round
- Welsh Cup: 6th round
- Top goalscorer: League: A.J.E. Hydes (13); All: A.J.E. Hydes (16)
- Highest home attendance: 20,261 vs Swindon Town (27 December 1938)
- Lowest home attendance: 7,010 vs Notts County (2 February 1939)
- Average home league attendance: 11,456
Home colours	Away colours

The 1938–39 season was Newport County's 17th season in the Football League Third Division South and 18th overall in the Football League. They had been ever-present in the third tier except for the 1931–32 season since the introduction of the Football League Third Division in 1920.

Newport County attained promotion to the Football League Second Division for the 1939–40 season on 15 April 1939 with two league games remaining following a 3–0 win over Southend United.

== Season review ==
=== Results summary ===
Overall								Home						Away					
Pld	W	D	L	GF	GA	GAv	Pts	W	D	L	GF	GA	Pts	W	D	L	GF	GA	Pts
42	22	11	9	58	45	1.289	55	15	4	2	37	16	34	7	7	7	21	29	21

Source: rsssf.com

=== Results by round ===
Round	1	2	3	4	5	6	7	8	9	10	11	12	13	14	15	16	17	18	19	20	21	22	23	24	25	26	27	28	29	30	31	32	33	34	35	36	37	38	39	40	41	42
Ground	A	A	H	H	H	A	A	H	A	H	A	H	A	H	A	H	H	H	H	A	H	A	A	A	A	A	H	H	A	H	A	H	A	H	A	H	H	A	A	H	H	A
Result	W	L	W	W	D	D	L	W	W	W	W	D	D	W	W	W	W	W	W	L	W	W	W	L	W	L	W	L	D	W	L	W	D	D	D	D	W	D	D	W	L	L
Position	3	9	6	4	2	2	6	5	2	1	1	1	1	1	1	1	1	1	1	1	1	1	1	1	1	1	1	1	1	1	1	1	1	1	1	1	1	1	1	1	1	1

Updated to match(es) played on 2 May 1939. Source: statto.com
A = Away; H = Home; W = Win; D = Draw; L = Loss

== Fixtures and results ==
=== Third Division South ===
Date	Opponents	Venue	Result	Scorers	Attendance
Sat 27 Aug 1938	Clapton Orient	A	3–1	Carr, Duggan, Hearty (OG)	10,596
Mon 29 Aug 1938	Port Vale	A	1–2	Hickman	6,240
Sat 3 Sep 1938	Cardiff City	H	3–0	Hydes 2, Carr	18,892
Thu 8 Sep 1938	Watford	H	1–0	Derrick	8,500
Sat 10 Sep 1938	Northampton Town	H	1–1	Hickman	11,534
Wed 14 Sep 1938	Watford	A	1–1	Derrick	5,310
Sat 17 Sep 1938	Notts County	A	0–2		10,834
Sat 24 Sep 1938	Aldershot	H	1–0	Duggan	9,652
Sat 1 Oct 1938	Bristol City	A	2–0	Hickman, Duggan	14,497
Sat 8 Oct 1938	Crystal Palace	H	2–0	Wood, Derrick	10,631
Sat 15 Oct 1938	Ipswich Town	A	4–1	Wood 2, Hickman, Derrick	13,843
Sat 22 Oct 1938	Exeter City	H	0–0		11,423
Sat 29 Oct 1938	Bristol Rovers	A	0–0		12,546
Sat 5 Nov 1938	Brighton & Hove Albion	H	2–0	Duggan, Derrick	11,290
Sat 12 Nov 1938	Bournemouth & Boscombe Athletic	A	1–0	Derrick	7,857
Sat 19 Nov 1938	Walsall	H	2–1	Wood 2	9,870
Sat 3 Dec 1938	Queens Park Rangers	H	2–0	Carr, Hydes	12,338
Sat 17 Dec 1938	Reading	H	2–0	Derrick, Hydes	9,870
Sat 24 Dec 1938	Clapton Orient	H	2–1	Hydes 2	9,323
Mon 26 Dec 1938	Swindon Town	A	0–8		9,023
Tue 27 Dec 1938	Swindon Town	H	6–4	Carr 3, Hickman, Hydes, Parkhouse (OG)	20,261
Sat 31 Dec 1938	Cardiff City	A	2–1	Hydes, Carr	40,187
Wed 11 Jan 1939	Mansfield Town	A	2–0	Hydes, Hickman	1,419
Thu 14 Jan 1939	Northampton Town	A	0–1		9,025
Sat 21 Jan 1939	Reading	A	1–0	Hydes	11,292
Sat 28 Jan 1939	Aldershot	A	0–1		7,999
Thu 2 Feb 1939	Notts County	H	2–1	Brinton, Carr	7,010
Sat 4 Feb 1939	Bristol City	H	0–2		12,436
Sat 11 Feb 1939	Crystal Palace	A	1–1	Derrick	29,155
Sat 18 Feb 1939	Ipswich Town	H	3–2	Hydes 2, Wood	12,257
Sat 25 Feb 1939	Exeter City	A	1–3	Brinton	9,370
Sat 4 Mar 1939	Bristol Rovers	H	2–0	W.M.Owen, Warren (OG)	9,722
Sat 11 Mar 1939	Brighton & Hove Albion	A	0–0		15,157
Sat 18 Mar 1939	Bournemouth & Boscombe Athletic	H	2–2	Carr, Hickman	11,637
Sat 25 Mar 1939	Walsall	A	1–1	Hydes	7,500
Sat 1 Apr 1939	Mansfield Town	H	0–0		10,600
Fri 7 Apr 1939	Torquay United	H	1–0	Brinton	14,677
Sat 8 Apr 1939	Queens Park Rangers	A	0–0		14,864
Mon 10 Apr 1939	Torquay United	A	1–1	Derrick	6,863
Sat 15 Apr 1939	Southend United	H	3–0	Derrick, Hickman, Wood	11,397
Sat 29 Apr 1939	Port Vale	H	0–2		7,260
Tue 2 May 1939	Southend United	A	0–5		2,815

=== FA Cup ===
Round	Date	Opponents	Venue	Result	Scorers	Attendance
1	26 Nov 1938	Reading	Elm Park	3–3	Hydes 2, Derrick	19,106
1r	5 Dec 1938	Reading	Somerton Park	3–1	Wood 2, Hydes	10,760
2	10 Dec 1938	Horden Colliery Welfare	Horden Welfare Park	3–2	Wood 2, Hickman	7,180
3	7 Jan 1939	Walsall	Somerton Park	0–2		9,645

=== Third Division South Cup ===
Round	Date	Opponents	Venue	Result	Scorers	Attendance
1	29 Sep 1938	Bristol Rovers	Somerton Park	1–0	Duggan	709
2	8 Feb 1939	Torquay United	Plainmoor	0–0		
2r	22 Feb 1939	Torquay United	Somerton Park	1–3	Brinton	618

=== Welsh Cup ===
Round	Date	Opponents	Venue	Result	Scorers	Attendance
6	8 Mar 1939	Cardiff City	Ninian Park	1–5	Higgins	

== League table ==
Pos	Team	Pld	W	D	L	F	A	GA	GD	Pts
1	Newport County	42	22	11	9	58	45	1.289	+13	55
2	Crystal Palace	42	20	12	10	71	52	1.365	+19	52
3	Brighton & Hove Albion	42	19	11	12	68	49	1.388	+19	49
4	Watford	42	17	12	13	62	51	1.216	+11	46
5	Reading	42	16	14	12	69	59	1.169	+10	46
6	Queens Park Rangers	42	15	14	13	68	49	1.388	+19	44
7	Ipswich Town	42	16	12	14	62	52	1.192	+10	44
8	Bristol City	42	16	12	14	61	63	0.968	–2	44
9	Swindon Town	42	18	8	16	72	77	0.935	–5	44
10	Aldershot	42	16	12	14	53	66	0.803	–13	44
11	Notts County	42	17	9	16	59	54	1.093	+4	43
12	Southend United	42	16	9	17	61	64	0.953	–3	41
13	Cardiff City	42	15	11	16	61	65	0.938	–4	41
14	Exeter City	42	13	14	15	65	82	0.793	–17	40
15	Bournemouth & Boscombe Athletic	42	13	13	16	52	58	0.897	–6	39
16	Mansfield Town	42	12	15	15	44	62	0.710	–18	39
17	Northampton Town	42	15	8	19	51	58	0.879	–7	38
18	Port Vale	42	14	9	19	52	58	0.897	–6	37
19	Torquay United	42	14	9	19	54	70	0.771	–16	37
20	Clapton Orient	42	11	13	18	53	55	0.964	–2	35
21	Walsall	42	11	11	20	68	69	0.986	–1	33
22	Bristol Rovers	42	10	13	19	55	61	0.902	–6	33

Pld = Matches played; W = Matches won; D = Matches drawn; L = Matches lost; F = Goals for; A = Goals against;
GA = Goal average; GD = Goal difference; Pts = Points

Key	
	Division Champions, promoted
	Re-elected
	Failed re-election (none)
