= George Wheeler (footballer) =

Welsh footballer

Personal information
- Full name: George Harold Wheeler
- Date of birth: 19 February 1910
- Place of birth: Newport, Wales
- Date of death: 1995 (aged 84–85)
- Position: Left back

Senior career*
Years	Team	Apps	(Gls)
1928–1932	Newport County	60	(1)
- Lovell's Athletic

International career
1931	Wales Amateurs	2	(0)
- * Club domestic league appearances and goals

George Harold Wheeler (19 February 1910 – 1995) was a Welsh amateur footballer who played in the Football League for Newport County as a left back. He was capped by Wales at amateur level.
