= Graham Rogers (footballer) =

Welsh footballer and manager

Personal information
- Full name: Graham Reginald Rogers
- Date of birth: 5 September 1955 (age 71)
- Place of birth: Newport, Wales

Youth career
- Newport County

Senior career*
Years	Team	Apps	(Gls)
1973–1975	Newport County	4	(0)
- Forest Green Rovers
1985	Newport County	7	(0)
1985	Stroud		

Managerial career
- 1993–1996: Newport County
- * Club domestic league appearances and goals

Graham Reginald Rogers (born 5 September 1955) is a Welsh former professional footballer and manager.

A defender, he began his career at Newport County and made four Football League appearances in the 1974–75 season before joining Forest Green Rovers. He rejoined Newport in 1985, making a further seven appearances before joining Stroud.

In 1993, he was appointed manager of Newport County and he retained the position until 1996.
