= Glyn Jones (footballer, born 1959) =

Welsh footballer

Personal information
- Full name: Glyn Alan Jones
- Date of birth: 29 March 1959 (age 67)
- Place of birth: Newport, Wales
- Position: Goalkeeper

Youth career
- Aston Villa

Senior career*
Years	Team	Apps	(Gls)
1977–1980	Bristol Rovers	9	(0)
1980	Gloucester City		
1980–198?	Shrewsbury Town	0	(0)
1981	Yeovil Town	5	(0)
- Newport YMCA
198?–1983	Bath City		
1983–1984	Newport County	3	(0)
1984–198?	Albion Rovers		
- Forest Green Rovers

Managerial career
- 2005: Newport County (caretaker)
- * Club domestic league appearances and goals

Glyn Alan Jones (born 29 March 1959) is a Welsh former professional footballer who played as a goalkeeper. He went on to become a long serving youth coach and caretaker manager at Newport County.

== Playing career ==
At the age of 14, in 1973, Jones entered competitive youth football by joining Aston Villa as a schoolboy, showcasing his potential as a goalkeeper through regional trials and school representative matches. Returning to Wales, he continued developing locally before trialing with Bristol Rovers on 24 August 1975. Jones played for Bristol Rovers, making his league debut against Burnley in October 1977 in a Second division fixture. Unfortunately in his third match during that month he and Rovers faced the newly relegated Tottenham Hotspur who had an afternoon to remember as they put nine goals past Jones and his overworked defence without reply in front also of the BBC Match of the Day cameras. Ironically Glyn won plaudits for his inspired performance that afternoon and returned to Rovers Reserves team shortly afterwards. His next game was at Tottenham for the Reserves in front of a small crowd. He also played for Newport County, Shrewsbury Town, Gloucester City and Shrewsbury Town during his career. Jones' league debuts for Bristol Rovers, Shrewsbury and Newport were all at Turf Moor against Burnley.

He also had brief spells with Welsh non-league duo Albion Rovers and Newport YMCA as well as Forest Green Rovers.

== Coaching career ==
In 1997, he was appointed the Director of the youth Academy at Newport County, and in the 2001–02 season he helped lead the youth team to the English Schools' Football Association under-19 Trophy under the banner of Hartridge High School.

He oversaw the progression of many young players to the Newport County first team including Nathan Davies, Andrew Hughes and Lee Evans.

He also worked as assistant manager in a spell under Peter Nicholas. In September 2005, following the sacking of John Cornforth as manager, he was appointed as caretaker manager at Newport prior to the appointment of Peter Beadle.

He was succeeded after 17 years as Academy Director in May 2014 by Michael Flynn.

In October 2014, he was appointed as goalkeeper coach at Forest Green Rovers in the Conference National.

In June 2021, he joined Southern Football League side Larkhall Athletic to assist Phil Bater on his coaching staff.

Jones is related to former Bristol City, Shrewsbury Town and Hereford United defender Darren Jones, and played a key role in signing him for his first spell at Newport County in February 2004.

He is also a part of the coaching staff in the Welsh FA schools set-up.
