= Arthur Hydes =

English footballer (1911–1990)

Personal information
- Date of birth: 24 November 1911
- Place of birth: Barnsley, England
- Date of death: 1990 (aged 78–79)
- Position: Forward

Senior career*
Years	Team	Apps	(Gls)
- Leeds United
- Newport County
- * Club domestic league appearances and goals

Arthur Hydes (24 November 1911 – 1990) was an English football player born in Barnsley. He played for Leeds United and Newport County. He scored almost 100 goals in his career with over 80 of them at Leeds. This included three consecutive years as Leeds' leading scorer.
