= 1946–47 Newport County A.F.C. season =

Welsh association football club season

Newport County
1946–47 season
- Manager: Tom Bromilow
- Stadium: Somerton Park
- Second Division: 22nd (relegated)
- FA Cup: 3rd round
- Welsh Cup: Semi-final
- Top goalscorer: League: E.M.Carr (19); All: E.M.Carr (19)
- Highest home attendance: 18,715 vs Swansea Town (12 October 1946)
- Lowest home attendance: 8,798 vs Newcastle United (7 June 1947)
- Average home league attendance: 12,505
Home colours	Away colours

The 1946–47 season was Newport County's first competitive season in the Football League Second Division. The club had been promoted at the end of the 1938–39 season and although play had started in the 1939–40 season it was abandoned due to the outbreak of war in Europe.

== Season review ==
=== Results summary ===
Overall								Home						Away					
Pld	W	D	L	GF	GA	GAv	Pts	W	D	L	GF	GA	Pts	W	D	L	GF	GA	Pts
42	10	3	29	61	133	0.459	23	9	1	11	41	52	19	1	2	18	20	81	4

Source: rsssf.com

=== Results by round ===
Round	1	2	3	4	5	6	7	8	9	10	11	12	13	14	15	16	17	18	19	20	21	22	23	24	25	26	27	28	29	30	31	32	33	34	35	36	37	38	39	40	41	42
Ground	A	A	H	H	A	H	A	A	H	A	H	H	A	H	A	H	A	H	H	H	A	A	H	A	A	A	A	A	H	A	A	H	H	A	H	H	H	H	H	A	H	A
Result	L	L	W	L	D	L	L	L	L	W	L	L	L	L	L	W	L	L	W	W	L	L	L	L	D	L	L	L	W	L	L	W	D	L	L	W	L	W	L	L	W	L
Position	22	22	20	20	20	20	22	22	22	22	22	22	22	22	22	22	22	22	22	22	22	22	22	22	22	22	22	22	22	22	22	22	22	22	22	22	22	22	22	22	22	22

Updated to match(es) played on 14 Jun 1947. Source: statto.com
A = Away; H = Home; W = Win; D = Draw; L = Loss

== Fixtures and results ==
=== Second Division ===
Date	Opponents	Venue	Result	Scorers	Attendance
7 Sep 1946	Nottingham Forest	A	1–6	Leamon	24,417
9 Sep 1946	Burnley	A	2–3	Rawcliffe, Keenan	18,008
14 Sep 1946	Coventry City	H	4–2	Wookey 2, Bowen, Leamon	14,104
19 Sep 1946	Tottenham Hotspur	H	2–4	Bowen, Mogford	18,169
21 Sep 1946	Birmingham City	A	1–1	Mogford	28,832
28 Sep 1946	West Bromwich Albion	H	2–7	Mogford, Davis	17,614
5 Oct 1946	Newcastle United	A	0–13		52,137
7 Oct 1946	Tottenham Hotspur	A	1–3	OG	14,540
12 Oct 1946	Swansea Town	H	2–4	Leamon, Carr	18,715
19 Oct 1946	Bury	A	1–0	Batty	13,214
24 Oct 1946	Southampton	H	1–2	Carr	11,149
26 Oct 1946	Luton Town	H	1–3	Carr	11,480
2 Nov 1946	Plymouth Argyle	A	1–4	Mogford	23,175
9 Nov 1946	Leicester City	H	2–3	Rawcliffe 2	12,350
16 Nov 1946	Chesterfield	A	0–2		12,030
23 Nov 1946	Millwall	H	3–1	Rawcliffe 2, Carr	9,742
30 Nov 1946	Bradford Park Avenue	A	1–2	Carr	12,555
7 Dec 1946	Manchester City	H	0–3		13,641
21 Dec 1946	Sheffield Wednesday	H	4–3	Carr 3, Lewis	10,680
25 Dec 1946	Fulham	H	4–2	Rawcliffe 2, Carr, OG	13,862
26 Dec 1946	Fulham	A	1–4	Carr	20,098
28 Dec 1946	Southampton	A	1–5	Rawcliffe	17,778
4 Jan 1947	Nottingham Forest	H	2–5	Carr, Lewis	13,150
18 Jan 1947	Coventry City	A	0–6		18,762
1 Feb 1947	West Bromwich Albion	A	2–2	Carr 2	15,089
8 Feb 1947	West Ham United	A	0–3		12,447
15 Feb 1947	Swansea Town	A	1–5	Williams	19,655
15 Mar 1947	Leicester City	A	0–3		20,455
22 Mar 1947	Chesterfield	H	3–0	Rawcliffe, Newall, Carr	10,358
29 Mar 1947	Millwall	A	1–3	Carr	18,154
4 Apr 1947	Barnsley	A	1–3	Batty	14,999
7 Apr 1947	Barnsley	H	2–1	Rawcliffe 2	11,013
19 Apr 1947	West Ham United	H	1–1	Rawcliffe	12,793
26 Apr 1947	Sheffield Wednesday	A	1–2	Carr	21,555
3 May 1947	Burnley	H	0–3		14,751
10 May 1947	Plymouth Argyle	H	1–0	Roffi	9,181
17 May 1947	Bradford Park Avenue	H	1–3	Lewis	10,159
24 May 1947	Bury	H	2–0	Lewis, Roffi	8,875
26 May 1947	Birmingham City	H	0–3		12,028
31 May 1947	Luton Town	A	3–6	Rawcliffe, Carr, Harper	7,814
7 Jun 1947	Newcastle United	H	4–2	Carr 2, Rawcliffe, Haddon	8,798
14 Jun 1947	Manchester City	A	1–5	Roffi	25,431

=== FA Cup ===
Round	Date	Opponents	Venue	Result	Scorers	Attendance
3	11 Jan 1947	Coventry City	A	2–5	Batty, Hayward	21,457

=== Welsh Cup ===
Round	Date	Opponents	Venue	Result	Scorers	Attendance
5	15 Jan 1947	Barry Town	A	3–3	Rawcliffe, Mogford, OG	1,800
5r	22 Jan 1947	Barry Town	H	4–1	Mogford, Batty, Hogg	2,000
6	24 Apr 1947	Shrewsbury Town	A	0–0		5,000
6r	5 May 1947	Shrewsbury Town	A	1–0	Newall	
SF	14 May 1947	Chester	A	2–3	Rawcliffe 2	7,500

== League table ==
Pos	Team	Pld	W	D	L	GF	GA	GAv	Pts	Qualification or relegation
18	Millwall	42	14	8	20	56	79	0.709	36	
19	Plymouth Argyle	42	14	5	23	79	96	0.823	33	
20	Sheffield Wednesday	42	12	8	22	67	88	0.761	32	
21	Swansea Town (R)	42	11	7	24	55	83	0.663	29	Relegation to the Third Division South
22	Newport County (R)	42	10	3	29	61	133	0.459	23	Relegation to the Third Division South

Rules for classification: 1) Points; 2) Goal average; 3) Goals scored
(R) Relegated
