= Newport County A.F.C. =

Association football club in Newport, Wales

Newport County
- Full name: Newport County Association Football Club
- Nicknames: The Exiles; Yr Alltudion (Welsh); The Ironsides; The Port; The Amber Army (supporters)
- Short name: Newport County
- Founded: 1912; 114 years ago (founded); June 1989; 37 years ago (reformed)
- Ground: Rodney Parade
- Capacity: 7,850
- Coordinates: 51.588332°N 2.988207°W
- Owner(s): Huw Jenkins 52%, Newport County AFC Supporters Trust 27%, Other investors 21%
- Chairman: Huw Jenkins
- Manager: Hayden Mullins
- League: EFL League Two
- 2025–26: EFL League Two, 20th of 24
- Website: newport-county.co.uk
Home colours	Away colours	Third colours

Newport County Association Football Club (Welsh: Clwb Pêl-droed Casnewydd) is a professional association football club in the city of Newport, South Wales. The team compete in EFL League Two, the fourth level of the English football league system. The club's usual home colours are amber shirts and black shorts.

Formed in 1912, the club began life in the Southern League before being invited to become founder members of the Football League Third Division in 1920. They failed re-election in 1931, but were elected back into the Football League the next year. They struggled for the next few seasons, but went on to be crowned Third Division South champions in 1938–39. World War II meant they had to wait until the 1946–47 season to take their place in the Second Division, though they were relegated at the end of the campaign. They were relegated out of the Third Division in 1962. In the 1979–80 season, under manager Len Ashurst, they secured promotion out of the Fourth Division and won the Welsh Cup for the first time. They reached the quarter-finals of the UEFA Cup Winner's Cup the next year. In the 1980s they suffered financial difficulties with a double relegation costing them their Football League place in 1988 and the club went out of business in February 1989.

The club reformed but were initially unable to play at their home ground at Somerton Park, so picked up the nickname of the "Exiles". They immediately won the Hellenic League in 1989–90 and were promoted out of the Southern League Midland Division in 1994–95. While playing at Newport Stadium, they were relegated from the Premier Division in 1997, before winning promotion out of the Midland Division again in 1998–99. Placed in the Conference South in 2004, they went on to be crowned champions in 2009–10 and after moving to Rodney Parade in 2012, they returned to the Football League following a 25-year absence after winning the Conference National play-off final in 2013 under manager Justin Edinburgh.

== History ==
=== 1912–1988 ===
==== Rise through the league ====
Newport County, originally nicknamed The Ironsides due to Newport being home to Lysaght's Orb Works steel works, started out in the Southern League in 1912 at Somerton Park. The official name of the club was The Newport & Monmouthshire County Association Football Club, although the shorter Newport County was soon adopted. The club were reformed in 1919 and were first elected to the Football League in 1920. They were not re-elected after the 1930–31 season but rejoined for 1932–33. After almost 20 years in the Third Division South, the club finally clinched promotion to the Second Division as champions in 1939 under manager Billy McCandless.

==== Second Division ====
Chart of yearly table positions of Newport County in the English football league system.

Hopes were high that the championship-winning side could prosper in the Second Division, but only three games were played of the 1939–40 season due to the outbreak of World War II. Newport County managed a 1–1 draw with Tottenham Hotspur and a 3–1 win over Southampton, finishing joint ninth out of 22 in the abandoned season. The War League operated for the remainder of the 1939–40 season and County finished 10th in the South-West Division.

After the war, the club reformed and competed in the temporary Football League South for the 1945–46 season. On the resumption of national league football for the 1946–47 season Newport resumed their place in the Second Division but the reshaped team suffered a host of defeats – including a joint Football League record 13–0 defeat at Newcastle United. Newcastle player Len Shackleton remarked "they were lucky to get nil". Despite victories over Coventry City, Sheffield Wednesday and Fulham, the club needed four wins out of the last four games to have any hope of safety. Despite a revenge victory over Newcastle United, defeats to Birmingham City, Luton Town and Manchester City sealed their fate. County finished bottom of the Second Division and were relegated.

==== Third Division ====
Newport reached the fifth round of the 1948–49 FA Cup under manager Tom Bromilow, the furthest they have gone in the competition, later equalled in 2019. They only narrowly lost the game 3–2 away to Portsmouth, the eventual FA Cup semi-finalists and First Division champions that season.

After 11 further seasons in the Third Division South, the club narrowly avoided another effective relegation with the creation of the Fourth Division for the 1958–59 season. The bottom 12 teams from the Third Division North and South were placed in the new division, with the remainder forming the revived Third Division. County avoided this fate by a mere four points. However, in 1962, with only seven wins all season, the club were relegated to the Fourth Division – their home for the next 18 years.

==== Fourth Division ====
Billy Lucas had the first of three spells as Newport County manager from 1953 to 1961. County reached the fourth round of the 1956–57 FA Cup losing 2–0 to Arsenal in front of 20,000 spectators at Somerton Park. In the 1958–59 FA Cup County faced Tottenham Hotspur in the fourth round. The game was played in heavy snow away at White Hart Lane, and although County lost 4–1 their goal came from an incredible 35-yard effort by defender Ken Hollyman. This made the score-line 1–2, giving County the hope that they could force an upset upon Bill Nicholson's men (who were double winners a year later). However, two late goals for Tottenham ended County's hopes of pulling off a shock result. County faced Tottenham again in the 1959–60 FA Cup third round at Somerton Park in front of a cup record 24,000 crowd, this time losing 4–0.

In January 1964 under Billy Lucas in his second spell as manager, County took on another high-profile side – Burnley, the 1960 Division One champions and 1962 double runners-up – in the FA Cup fourth round, but again suffered defeat 2–1.

In the 1970–71 season the Newport team managed by Bobby Ferguson set an unwanted Football League record by not winning any of their first 25 matches, losing 21 in the process. In the same season Newport equalled the worst defeat of a Football League club by a non-league club when they lost 6–1 to Barnet in the FA Cup first round. Results improved in the following season under Billy Lucas in his third spell as manager and in the 1972–73 season Newport missed out on promotion only on goal average.

For the 1976–77 season the team managed by Jimmy Scoular changed their playing strip to light blue and white striped shirts, light blue shorts and white socks akin to the Argentina national team in an attempt to turn around their fortunes. However, the team continued to struggle until Colin Addison took over in January 1977. The season became known as "the great escape" as County avoided relegation with a 1–0 win at home to Workington in the last game of the season.

==== Promotion, cup 'glory' and European run ====
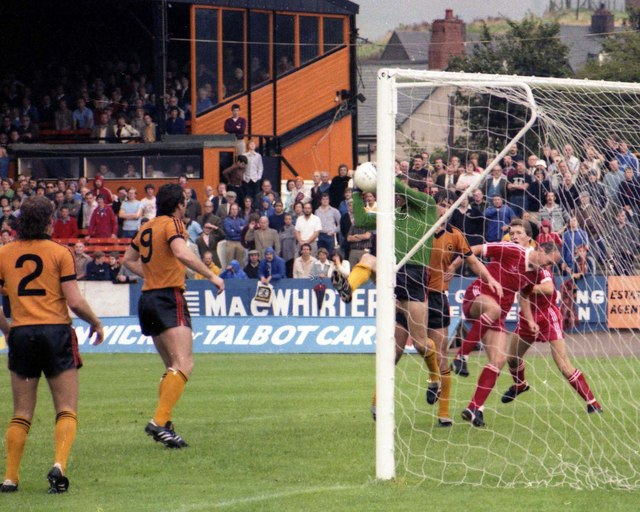
Top-of-the-table Newport playing Oxford United in a Third Division clash in 1981

The 1980s heralded both the brightest and darkest moments in Newport County's history. Len Ashurst was manager from 1978 to 1982, the club's most successful period in its history and under the chairmanship of Richard Ford. In the 1978–79 FA Cup County beat West Ham United 2–1 in round three before losing 1–0 to Colchester United in a fourth round replay. In 1980, promotion was finally achieved from the Football League Fourth Division, the club being only five points from being crowned champions although never being in contention to win the league and never being top. County sealed promotion in the last match of the season with a 4–2 win at high-flying Walsall. Walsall finished second in the league and were also promoted.

The team included a young John Aldridge who later became one of the most prolific goal-scorers in English football history, most famous for helping Liverpool win the First Division title in 1988 and FA Cup in 1989, as well as helping Oxford United win two successive promotions and the Football League Cup.

Also in the promotion-winning team was Tommy Tynan, one of the leading lower-league strikers of his era, who scored the all-important goal that sealed County's promotion. Dave Gwyther completed the trio of prolific goalscorers whilst captain Keith Oakes provided strength in central defence. Youth team products Steve Lowndes and Nigel Vaughan went on to attain international caps for Wales. This was also the year that County won the Welsh Cup, entitling them to play in the 1980–81 season European Cup Winners' Cup.

The 1980–81 European Cup Winners' Cup turned out to be quite eventful – the first round against Crusaders of Northern Ireland was won 4–0 on aggregate (4–0 at home and 0–0 away). The second round against SK Haugar of Norway was even more convincing: after a 0–0 draw away, the home leg was won 6–0, taking the club into the quarter-finals against Carl Zeiss Jena F.C. of East Germany. Aldridge was injured for both matches against Carl Zeiss Jena, though he was a non-playing substitute in the 2nd leg. The quarter-final away leg was drawn 2–2 with Tommy Tynan scoring both goals, including his equaliser in the 90th minute. However, despite dominating the home leg, Newport lost 1–0 in front of 18,000 fans at Somerton Park, denying them a high-profile semi-final with S.L. Benfica. Carl Zeiss Jena went on to be the eventual cup runners-up, losing the final to Dinamo Tbilisi of the Soviet Union.

The Newport County squad for the first leg was: 1 Gary Plumley, 2 Richard Walden, 3 John Relish, 4 Grant Davies, 5 Keith Oakes (Captain), 6 Tommy Tynan, 7 Nigel Vaughan, 8 Steve Lowndes, 9 Dave Gwyther, 10 Karl Elsey, 11 Kevin Moore, 12 Neil Bailey, 13 Steve Warriner, 14 Dave Bruton, 15 Bobby Ward, 16 Mark Kendall.

In the 1982–83 season Colin Addison, in his second spell as manager, led Newport County to their highest post-war league finish – 4th in the Third Division, just four points behind third-placed Huddersfield Town. Huddersfield were promoted to the Second Division, along with champions Portsmouth and local rivals Cardiff City. County had actually gone top of the table in early April after a 1–0 win over Cardiff in front of 16,052 fans at Somerton Park, but a return of only four points from the last seven games meant County missed out on promotion. County faced First-Division team Everton in the third round of the 1982–83 FA Cup. After a 1–1 draw at Newport, Everton won the replay 2–1.

In 1986 County reached the FA Cup third round under manager Bobby Smith, losing 2–0 to Sunderland. Newport appeared in the Welsh Cup final again in 1987 under manager John Lewis, this time losing 1–0 to Merthyr Tydfil after a replay.

==== Freefall and bankruptcy ====
Despite reaching the Welsh Cup final, County were relegated from the Third Division in 1987 and in 1988 finished bottom of the Fourth Division with a mere 25 points, meaning that their 60-season stay in the Football League was over. They failed to finish their first season in the Conference and finally went out of business on 27 February 1989 with debts of £330,000. They were then expelled from the Conference for failing to fulfil their fixtures. Their record (four wins, seven draws and 19 points from 29 games) was expunged.

The BBC Wales current affairs programme Week in Week Out broadcast a documentary in 1989 about the winding up of Newport County and its controversial owner at the time, American Jerry Sherman.

=== 1989 onwards ===
==== Reformation and exile ====
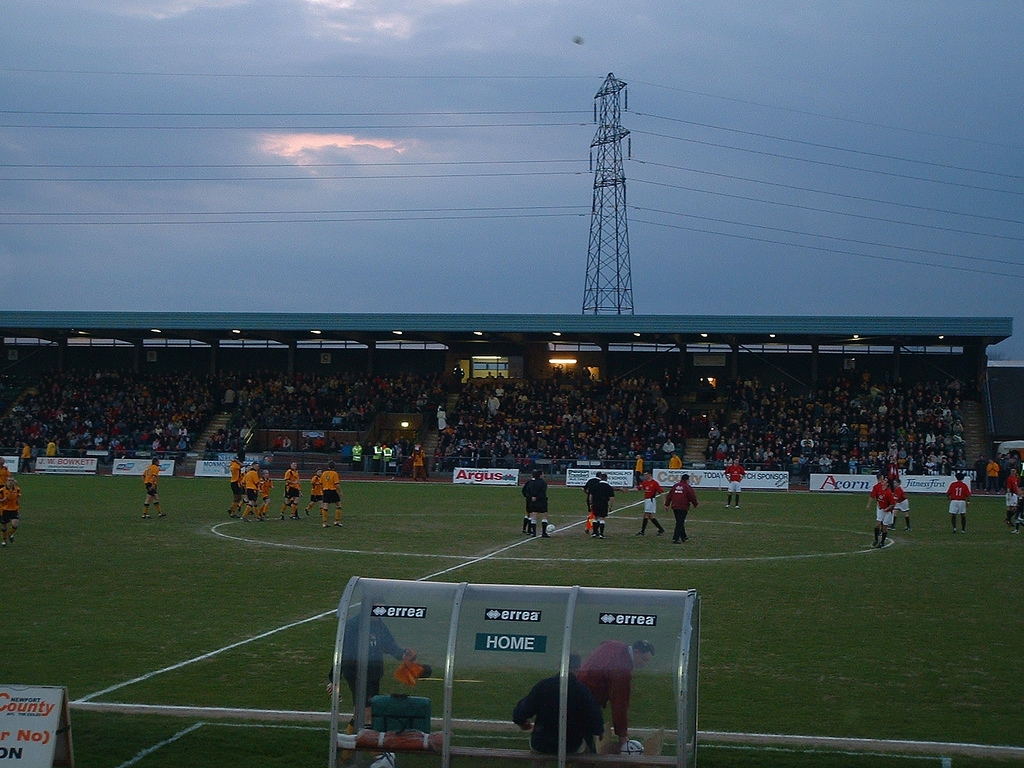
Newport Stadium, 2004

In June 1989 the club was reformed by 400 supporters, including David Hando as chairman and, later, club president. Former manager John Relish was re-appointed team manager and they were elected to the Hellenic League (then four divisions below the Football League). The club's main aim was to regain the Football League status lost in 1988. The club took on the name "Newport A.F.C." and adopted the nickname The Exiles, as a result of having to play home matches for the 1989–90 season at the London Road ground in the north Gloucestershire town of Moreton-in-Marsh, 80 miles (130 km) north-east of Newport. Newport Council considered the new company to be a continuation of the old, and refused it permission to use Somerton Park on the grounds of unpaid rent.

Newport won the Hellenic double, gaining promotion to the Southern League. After the 1990–91 and 1991–92 seasons back home in Newport at Somerton Park, the Football Association of Wales (FAW) consigned them to a further two seasons of exile in England, ground-sharing at Gloucester City's Meadow Park stadium for 1992–93 and 1993–94. The club was forced to resort to legal action to protect themselves from being forced out of the English football league system by FAW secretary Alun Evans, who was promoting the first national League of Wales formed for the 1992–93 season. That litigation proved successful, with a landmark High Court verdict enabling them to have a permanent home in Newport at the then newly built Newport Stadium.

The club's first season back in Newport, in 1994–95 under manager Graham Rogers, saw them promoted to the Southern League Premier Division, after winning the Midland Division Championship by a 14-point margin. On the way to that championship, the club set a then record for the Southern League by winning 14 successive league matches.

==== Further progress ====
In 1999, the club reintroduced the name Newport County A.F.C.

In the 2001–02 season the team managed by Tim Harris reached the first round proper of the FA Cup for the first time since the club was reformed, drawing Second Division side Blackpool. Holding them to a 2–2 draw away, County lost the home replay 4–1 after extra time. The following season, then managed by Peter Nicholas, Newport reached the final of the FAW Premier Cup beating Swansea City and Cardiff City along the way before losing 6–1 in the final against Wrexham.

==== Conference South ====
Subsequent reorganisation of the upper divisions of non-league football saw County take their place in the 2004–05 inaugural season of Conference South, one of the two feeder divisions into the Football Conference. Peter Beadle was appointed manager in October 2005 and in the 2006–07 season Newport again reached the first round proper of the FA Cup but lost 3–1 to Swansea City. In the same season, Newport reached the final of the FAW Premier Cup for the second time, beating Wrexham along the way but losing 1–0 to TNS in the final. In 2006–07 Newport finished just one position below the playoffs after losing 2–1 to Cambridge City on the final day of the season.

In the 2007–08 season, Newport won the last-ever FAW Premier Cup beating Llanelli 1–0 in the final, making a total of one win out of three finals. For the second consecutive season a last-day defeat prevented County reaching the Conference South playoffs. In April 2008 Peter Beadle was sacked as club manager, and was replaced by Dean Holdsworth.

In his first full season in charge, Holdsworth led Newport to a 10th-place finish in the league, despite a poor start. Newport went top of the league in September of the 2009–10 season and held onto the top spot for the rest of the season. The league title was won in March 2010 after beating Havant and Waterlooville 2–0 at Newport Stadium with seven league games remaining. The win made them the first team in the English football leagues to achieve promotion in the 2009–10 season. County finished the season with a Conference South record 103 points, 28 ahead of nearest rivals Dover Athletic. Craig Reid was the league's top scorer with 24 goals in the season.

==== Conference Premier ====
Newport County were promoted to the Conference Premier for the 2010–11 season, the level they had played at prior to bankruptcy in 1989. Dean Holdsworth left Newport County to become team manager of League Two club Aldershot Town on 12 January 2011 with Newport County in fifth place in the Conference Premier table. Tottenham Hotspur reserve-team coach Anthony Hudson was announced as the new manager on 1 April 2011. The team finished their first season back in the Conference Premier league in ninth place.

After a poor start to the 2011–12 season with the team last-but-one in the table after picking up just a single win out of the first 12 games, Hudson was sacked on 28 September 2011. He was replaced on 4 October 2011 by Justin Edinburgh with the task of saving County from relegation. Under Edinburgh, County finished in 19th place and so maintained their Conference Premier status. They also reached the 2012 FA Trophy Final and their first Wembley Stadium appearance coincided with the 100th anniversary of the club. County lost the final 2–0 to York City who went on to secure promotion to the Football League a week later in a Wembley play-off match.

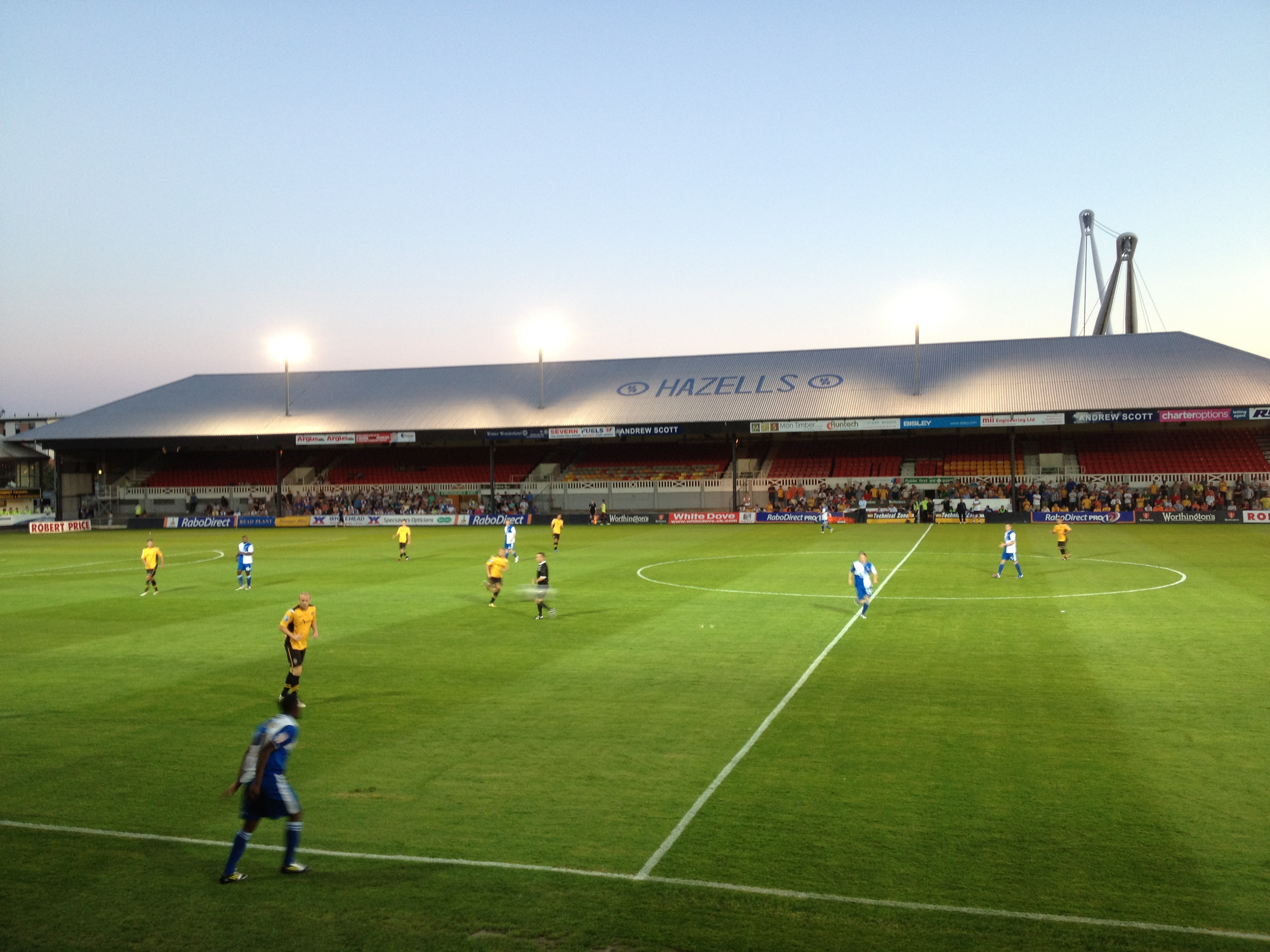
Rodney Parade 2012

In May 2012, Newport County announced that they had agreed a deal to move to the city's rugby stadium, Rodney Parade. In August 2012 EuroMillions lottery winner Les Scadding succeeded Chris Blight as club chairman. In February 2013 a further 10-year lease to play at Rodney Parade was signed.

The centenary 2012–13 season saw Newport County finish third in the Conference Premier league, reaching the play-offs for the first time. A 2–0 aggregate win over Grimsby Town in the two-legged play-off semi-final saw Newport County reach the 2013 Conference Premier play-off final at Wembley Stadium. The final versus Wrexham was the first Wembley final to feature two Welsh teams, and Newport County won 2–0 to return to the Football League after a 25-year absence with promotion to League Two. County were awarded Freedom of the City of Newport on 17 August 2013 in recognition of this achievement.

==== Return to League Two 2013 ====
On their return to the Football League in the 2013–14 season, Newport County finished a creditable 14th in League Two. On 7 February 2015, with Newport County in sixth place in League Two, it was confirmed that Justin Edinburgh had been appointed manager at Gillingham. Jimmy Dack stepped up from assistant manager at the club to caretaker manager and was later appointed manager until the end of the 2014–15 season. On 29 April, Dack stated he had been offered the manager's job beyond the end of the season but he had decided he would move on after the final game. Newport finished the 2014–15 season in ninth place in League Two. Terry Butcher was appointed team manager on 30 April 2015. On 18 June 2015 Les Scadding resigned as Newport County chairman and director.

==== Supporters Trust takeover 2015 ====
On 1 October 2015 Newport County Supporters' Trust took over ownership of the club with Tony Pring appointed interim chairman. Butcher was sacked on the same day, with Newport bottom of League Two after gaining just five points from the first 10 matches of the 2015–16 season. John Sheridan was appointed team manager on 2 October 2015 until the end of the 2015–16 season and results improved. Sheridan resigned on 13 January 2016 after just 14 league games to take up the manager's job at Oldham Athletic. Assistant manager Warren Feeney was promoted to team manager on 15 January 2016. On 18 January 2016 County lost 2–1 to Championship team Blackburn Rovers in the FA Cup; the first time Newport had reached the third round of the cup since 1986. A good start saw Feeney gain 21 points from his first 12 games but results then worsened. Newport finished the season in 22nd place in League Two, avoiding relegation.

Feeney and Todd were sacked by Newport on 28 September 2016 with Newport County bottom of League Two having gained just six points from their first nine matches of the 2016–17 season. First team coach Sean McCarthy and goalkeeping player/coach James Bittner were appointed joint caretaker managers. Effective from 10 October 2016 Graham Westley was appointed team manager with Dino Maamria his assistant and Mccarthy released by the club. On 9 March 2017 Westley and Maamria were sacked with Newport 11 points adrift at the bottom of League Two.

==== Progress under Michael Flynn 2017–2021 ====
Following the departure of Westley, first team coach Michael Flynn was appointed caretaker manager for the remaining 12 league matches of the 2016–17 season and Wayne Hatswell returned to the club as assistant manager. A remarkable recovery saw Newport avoid relegation, sealed by a final day of the season 2–1 victory at home against Notts County with centre half Mark O'Brien scoring the 89th-minute winner. The season became known as the second "great escape" in the club's history.

On 9 May 2017 Flynn was appointed permanent team manager on a two-year contract. On 7 January 2018 a 2–1 home win over Championship club Leeds United in the FA Cup third round meant Newport progressed to the FA Cup fourth round for the first time since the 1978–79 FA Cup. In the following round, the club was drawn at home to Premier League club Tottenham Hotspur. On 27 January 2018 Newport achieved a creditable 1–1 draw to force a replay at Wembley Stadium. Tottenham won the replay 2–0. County finished the 2017–18 season in 11th place in League Two.

Newport began the 2018–19 creditably, securing 23 points from their first 10 games, losing only twice. On 6 January 2019, County won their home FA Cup third round tie against Premier League club Leicester City 2–1. The subsequent Fourth round drew Newport in an away match against Championship club Middlesbrough on 26 January 2019, in which they achieved a 1–1 draw, going on to a home replay victory 2–0 on 5 February 2019. County progressed to the most high-profile fixture in their modern history, the FA Cup fifth round which they had not reached since 1949. The Exiles were rewarded for their success with a home fixture against reigning Premier League champions Manchester City on 16 February 2019. County lost the match 4–1 with striker Pádraig Amond scoring a late goal. Amond finished the competition as joint-top scorer with Manchester City striker Gabriel Jesus. Newport finished the 2018–19 season in 7th place in League Two, thus qualifying for the League Two play-offs. In the semi-final against Mansfield Town, Newport drew the first leg 1–1 at home, drew the second leg 0–0 at Mansfield but then won the subsequent penalty shoot-out. In the League Two play-off final at Wembley Stadium on 25 May 2019 Newport lost to Tranmere Rovers 1–0, after a goal in the 119th minute.

On 27 August 2019, Newport County faced West Ham United of the Premier League in the EFL Cup, losing the tie 2–0. Newport also reached the semi-final of the EFL Trophy for the first time on 19 February 2020, losing to Salford City on penalties. The 2019–20 season was suspended on 13 March 2020 due to the COVID-19 pandemic in the United Kingdom, with Newport in 15th place in League Two. The club furloughed the players, management team and most staff to "protect the long-term financial viability" of the club. The League Two season was formally terminated on 9 June 2020. Points per game was subsequently adopted to determine the final League Two table with Newport County rising one place to 14th in the league. Club chairman Gavin Foxall stated that they expected to lose 40% of their income as a consequence of continued COVID-19 constraints.

On 22 September 2020 Newport County beat Championship club Watford 3–1 at home in the third round of the EFL Cup to reach the fourth round for the first time in the club's history. Newport were drawn at home to Premier League club Newcastle United in the fourth round and after drawing 1–1 in normal time, Newcastle won the penalty shoot-out. Newport again reached the third round of the 2020–21 FA Cup to face Premier League club Brighton & Hove Albion at home and lost to Brighton on penalties having drawn 1–1 after extra time. On 19 January 2021, goalkeeper Tom King scored the first goal of his career with a wind-assisted goal kick in the 12th minute of Newport's 1–1 League Two draw at Cheltenham Town. His goal was confirmed to have broken the Guinness World Record for longest football goal, with a distance of 96.01 metres (105 yards), a record previously held by Asmir Begović. In March 2020 Newport were permitted by the EFL to move two home matches to Cardiff City Stadium due to the poor condition of the Rodney Parade pitch. Newport finished the 2020–21 season in 5th place in League Two and qualified for the play-offs. Newport beat Forest Green Rovers 5–4 on aggregate to reach the play-off final for the second time in three seasons. On 31 May 2021, Newport lost 1–0 to Morecambe in the League Two play-off final at Wembley Stadium, a contentious 107th-minute penalty.

On 25 August 2021, Newport County faced Southampton of the Premier League in the second round of the 2021–22 EFL Cup but they lost heavily 8–0. Michael Flynn resigned as Newport County manager on 1 October 2021 after nine league matches of the 2021–22 season with Newport 15th in League Two.

==== 2021 onwards ====
Cardiff City first team coach James Rowberry was appointed Newport County manager on 19 October 2021 with Newport placing 13th in League Two after 13 league games. Newport finished the 2021–22 League Two season in 11th place. On 10 October 2022, Rowberry was sacked with Newport in 18th place in League Two after 13 league matches of the 2022–23 season.

On 20 October 2022, Graham Coughlan was appointed manager on a two-and-a-half-year contract. Newport reached the third round of the 2022–23 EFL Cup, losing 3–0 to Leicester City of the Premier League in November 2022. Newport finished the 2022–23 season in 15th position in League Two. In August 2023 Newport County reached the second round of the 2023–24 EFL Cup, losing on penalties to Brentford of the Premier League after drawing 1–1 in normal time.

On 24 January 2024 former Swansea City chairman Huw Jenkins purchased a controlling interest 52% of shares in Newport County from the Supporters Trust. In February 2024 Newport reached the fourth round of the 2023–24 FA Cup, losing 4–2 to Manchester United of the Premier League. Newport finished the 2023–24 season in 18th place in League Two. On 20 June 2024, Graham Coughlan departed the club by mutual consent.

On 16 July 2024 Nelson Jardim was appointed as Newport County Head Coach. Jardim left Newport County by mutual consent on 24 April 2025 with the club in 20th position in League Two and safe from relegation with two games to play of the 2024-25 season. Assistant head coach Dafydd Williams stepped up as head coach for those two matches. Newport finished the 2024-25 season in 22nd place in League Two. On 23 May 2025 David Hughes was appointed as team Manager. On 15 November 2025 Hughes was sacked by Newport with the club bottom of League Two on 11 points after 16 league games of the 2025-26 season. Christian Fuchs was appointed Newport County manager on 20 November 2025. A 2-1 win at Barrow on the final day of the 2025-26 season ensured that Newport finished 20th in League Two and avoided relegation. On 27 June 2026 Fuchs resigned as Newport County manager and assistant first team coach Chris Todd was appointed interim Manager.

On 31 July 2026 Hayden Mullins was appointed Newport County manager.

== Kit manufacturers and sponsors ==
Period	Kit Manufacturer	Shirt Sponsor
1974–1975	Adidas	None
1975–1976	None	None
1976–1977	Bukta	None
1977–1979	Adidas	None
1982–1983	Patrick	None
1983–1985	Patrick	South Wales Argus
1985–1989	Spall	South Wales Argus
1989	Scoreline	JLA
1989–1990	Umbro	AFG Newport, Newport Ford
1990–1991	None	None
1991–1992	Balan Sports International	Pirelli Cables
1992–1993	Balan Sports International	George Ford Motor Spares
1993–1994	None	Tom Witton Carpets
1994–1995	ProStar	Courage Best Bitter
1995–1996	Edwards Sports	Empress Car Sales
1996–1997	Edwards Sports	CableTel
1997–1998	ICIS	none/David McLean Homes (2nd half of season)
1998–1999	ICIS	Acorn Recruitment
1999–2007	Errea	Acorn Recruitment
2007–2009	Joma	Acorn Recruitment
2009–2011	Lotto	Acorn Recruitment
2011–2013	Macron	Acorn Recruitment
2013–2014	Macron	32Red
2014–2017	Macron	Mr. Tom
2017–2018	FBT	Mr. Tom
2018–2019	FBT	Interbet
2019–2020	FBT	Paddy Power
2020–2023	Hummel	Alzheimer's Society, Pure Vans
2023–	VX3 Sportswear	Pure Vans

== Ownership ==
A timeline showing the past and present directors of the club, and their tenure(s).

In 2015 following the sale of the club by majority shareholder Les Scadding, Newport County AFC Supporters Society Limited was established with guidance from the UK Government backed charity Supporters Direct. The Society is established as a trust with an elected board, yearly elections, regular AGMs, and fee-based supporter ownership.

As a Registered Society under the Co-operative and Community Benefit Societies Act 2014) the group acquired a majority shareholding in the football club's trading body, Newport Association Football Club Limited.

The supporters trust members elected a board of between 6 and 12 Directors. The board established that it would aim to operate with 9 directors, with a mixed model of elected and co-opted (unelected) directors. Directors are elected to three-year terms. In 2017 Peter Madigan and Mark Crook were co-opted to serve as unelected directors.

In 2017 a leaked resignation letter by director Charlie Hopkins he made allegations against some serving directors which were disputed by the Trust Board.

In October 2023 Newport County Supporters Trust members voted in favour of selling a controlling interest 52% of shares in the club to former Swansea City chairman Huw Jenkins, subject to EFL approval. The supporters trust retained 27% of shares and other previous private investors retained 21%. The sale was confirmed as completed on 24 January 2024

== Supporters ==
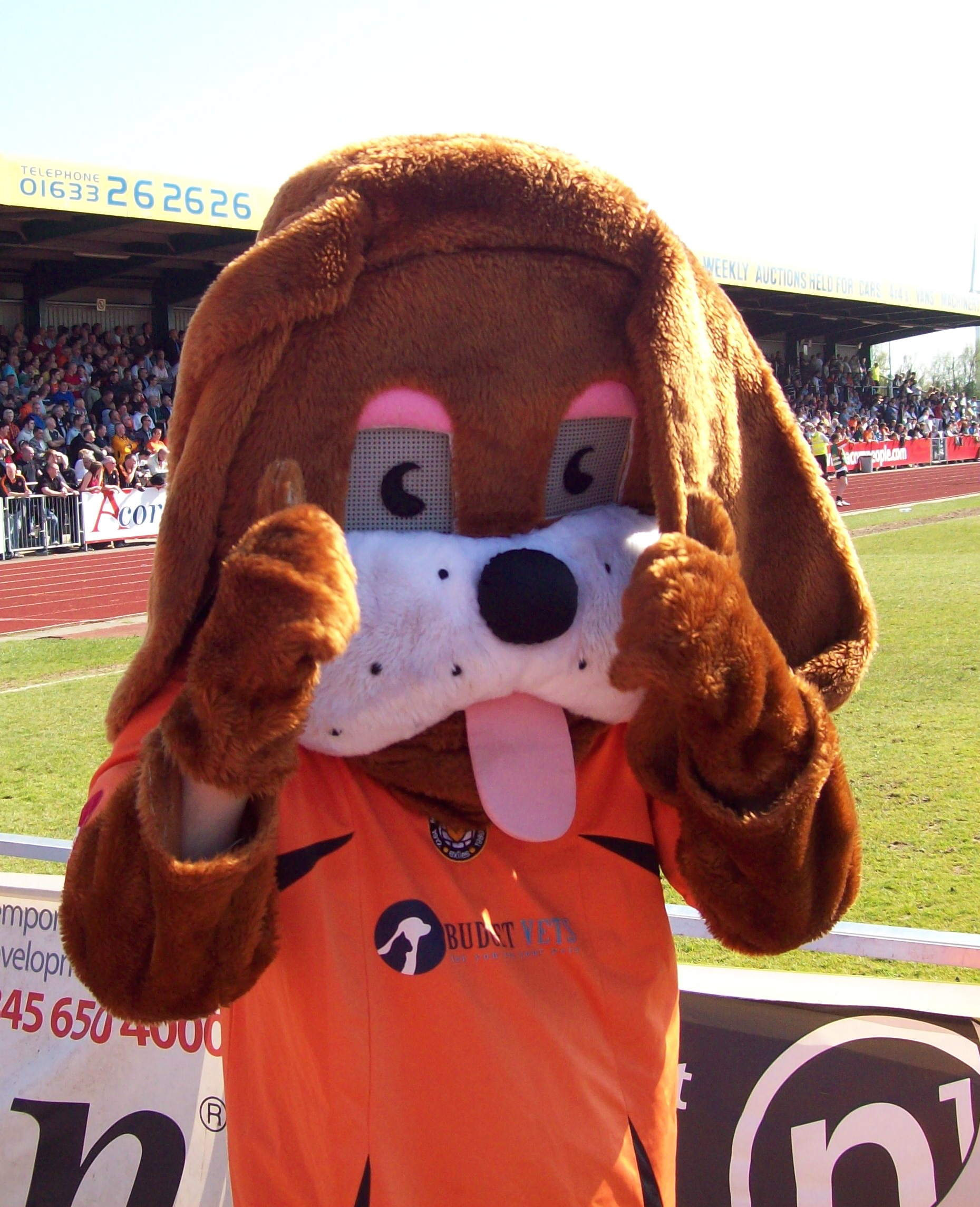
Club mascot Spytty the Dog

Newport County draws its main support from the city of Newport but also from the wider surrounding historic Monmouthshire area. The club's supporters refer to themselves as the Amber Army, in reference to the traditional club colour, and the sporting colours more widely associated with Newport. The club operates the 'ifollow' match day voice and video commentary service for supporters.

The supporters' unofficial anthem is Come on the County, written by Ken Buck and Eric Thomas. Originally released in 1973, it was re-recorded in 1999 and 2010. The 1999 release included the song Carl Zeiss Jena by Newport band Flyscreen, celebrating County's 1981 European campaign. The 2010 release included reworkings of Come on the County by The Tenants Supermen, who are ardent County fans. For the 2012 FA Trophy final, singer-songwriter Tracey Curtis wrote and released the song A Hundred Years of Football (And We're Off To Wembley).

In the 1970s and 1980s comedian Frank Carson was appointed as a director and vice president in order to raise the profile of the club. Newport-based rappers Goldie Lookin' Chain are supporters of the club and were the team's shirt sponsors for the 2004–05 season FAW Premier Cup matches

=== Rivalries ===
County fans consider their main rival to be South Wales rivals Cardiff City, however, the two sides have rarely met since the 1980s due to the league gap between them. Other rivals, to a lesser extent, include Welsh rivals Swansea City and Wrexham, as well as relatively local rivals Bristol Rovers, Cheltenham Town and Forest Green Rovers. A 2017 match against Swindon Town saw opposing fans clash before and after the game in Swindon town centre. Before a match at Rodney Parade in January 2020, Swindon fans were filmed throwing toilet paper and drinks containers outside a pub in Newport city centre.

During County's days in the non-league pyramid, Merthyr Tydfil and Bath City were considered rivals. County also used to maintain a rivalry with Hereford United. However, the club went out of business in 2014 and a new club, Hereford FC was formed.

== Players ==
=== Current squad ===
As of 4 November 2026

Note: Flags indicate national team as defined under FIFA eligibility rules; some limited exceptions apply. Players may hold more than one non-FIFA nationality.

No.	Pos.	Nation	Player
1	GK	ENG	Jordan Wright
2	DF	WAL	Cameron Evans
3	DF	WAL	Tom Davies
4	DF	SCO	Kyle Cameron (captain)
5	DF	WAL	Lee Jenkins
6	DF	IRL	Ciarán Brennan
7	MF	WAL	Kieron Evans
8	MF	WAL	Matthew Smith
9	FW	MAW	Shaquille Gwengwe
10	MF	ENG	Harrison Biggins
11	FW	WAL	James Crole
12	DF	WAL	Joe Thomas
14	FW	ENG	Moses Alexander-Walker
16	DF	ENG	Matty Jacob (on loan from Hull City)

No.	Pos.	Nation	Player
17	DF	ENG	Alfie Merritt (on loan from Bournemouth)
18	MF	WAL	Aaron Lewis
19	FW	ENG	Ged Garner
20	FW	FRA	Yahya Bamba
21	FW	WAL	Tanatswa Nyakuhwa (on loan from Cardiff City)
22	DF	ENG	Cameron Norman
23	FW	ENG	Michael Adu-Poku (on loan from Watford)
24	MF	NZL	Matt Dibley-Dias (on loan from Fulham)
25	GK	ENG	Jake Turner
28	FW	ENG	Kion Etete (on loan from Cardiff City)
27	FW	WAL	Christian Doidge
29	MF	WAL	Keenan Patten
33	GK	ENG	Shaun MacDonald
34	DF	ENG	Dan Sassi

=== Development squad players named in First Team squads ===
Note: Flags indicate national team as defined under FIFA eligibility rules; some limited exceptions apply. Players may hold more than one non-FIFA nationality.

No.	Pos.	Nation	Player
36	MF	WAL	Harri Pugh
38	DF	WAL	Harrison Halpin

No.	Pos.	Nation	Player
39	MF	WAL	Myles McKenzie
41	DF	WAL	Rocco Lenney

=== Out on loan ===
Note: Flags indicate national team as defined under FIFA eligibility rules; some limited exceptions apply. Players may hold more than one non-FIFA nationality.

No. / Pos. / Nation / Player; 40 / MF / WAL / Cole Jarvis (on loan to Merthyr Town)	No. / Pos. / Nation / Player

=== Youth academy ===
Glyn Jones was appointed director of the Newport County Youth Academy in 1997. In 1998 Newport County established a partnership with Newport City Council and the club has a youth development programme with around 50 students based at Llanwern High School.

The team compete in the Under-18 EFL Youth Alliance. A number of the academy graduates have progressed to the senior squad including Andrew Hughes, Lee Evans, Regan Poole, Aaron Collins, Tom Owen-Evans, Kieran Parselle, Lewis Collins, Kiban Rai and Harrison Bright.

In the 2001–02 season County's youth team won the English Schools' Football Association under-19 trophy under the banner of Hartridge High School. In the 2004–05 season they won the FAW Youth Cup.

In May 2014 Glyn Jones was succeeded after 17 years as academy director by Michael Flynn. In 2015 the academy organisation was restructured to comply to FA requirements and in June 2015 Grant Kalahar was appointed to the senior role of academy manager. Kalahar left the academy at the end of the 2015–16 season with Byron Anthony appointed academy manager.

Newport County were champions of the EFL Youth Alliance in the 2016–17 season.

Byron Anthony resigned in November 2018. Stevenage coach Jorden Gibson was appointed Newport County Academy Manager in June 2019 but he resigned 11 September 2019 following an internal investigation after an altercation with a youth team player. In December 2019 Damien Broad was promoted internally to academy manager. In November 2022 Luke Hussey was promoted internally to academy manager. In December 2025 Jordan Hughes was appointed as Newport County Academy Manager.

=== Notable former players ===
For all Newport County players with a Wikipedia article see Category:Newport County A.F.C. players.

== Coaching staff ==
As of 15 November 2026

Position	Staff
Manager	(England) Hayden Mullins
Assistant Manager	(Wales) Chris Todd
Head of Goalkeeping	(Wales) Rob Thomas
Head Physio	Marios Alexiou
Head of Performance	Jac Sudale
Kit Man	Harri Griffiths
Club Doctor	Jonathan Taube
Player Liaison Officer	(Republic of Ireland) Mark O'Brien
Head of Football Operations	Chris Finn

Academy Position	Staff
Academy Manager	(Wales) Jordan Hughes
Academy Head of Coaching	Ben Gast
Head of Schoolboy Football & Operations	Ryan Morley
Lead Professional Development Phase Coach	Joe Flurry
Assistant Professional Development Phase Coach	Andrew Whittington
Lead Youth Development Phase Coach	TBC
Lead Foundation Phase Coach	TBC
Player Care Officer	Chris Silver
Head of Education	TBC

Office	Staff
Chief Executive Officer	Sam Houldsworth
Club Secretary	Shaun Bowden

== Honours ==
League

- Third Division South (level 3)
  - Champions: 1938–39
- Fourth Division (level 4)
  - Promoted: 1979–80
- Conference Premier (level 5)
  - Play-off winners: 2013
- Conference South (level 6)
  - Champions: 2009–10
- Southern League Midland Division
  - Champions: 1994–95
- Hellenic League
  - Champions: 1989–90

Cup

- FA Trophy
  - Runners-up: 2011–12
- Welsh Cup
  - Winners: 1979–80
- FAW Premier Cup
  - Winners: 2007–08
  - Runners-up: 2002–03, 2006–07

== See also ==
- List of Newport County A.F.C. managers
- List of Newport County A.F.C. players
- List of Newport County A.F.C. records and statistics
