= 1979–80 Newport County A.F.C. season =

Welsh association football club season

Newport County
1979–80 season
- Chairman: Richard Ford
- Manager: Len Ashurst
- Stadium: Somerton Park
- Fourth Division: 3rd (Promoted)
- FA Cup: 1st round
- League Cup: 1st round
- Welsh Cup: Winners
- Top goalscorer: League: Aldridge (14); All: Aldridge (16)
- Highest home attendance: 9,950 vs Shrewsbury Town (Welsh Cup, 6 May 1980)
- Lowest home attendance: 3,185 vs Northampton Town (18 September 1979)
- Average home league attendance: 5,137
Home colours	Away colours

The 1979–80 season was Newport County's 18th consecutive season in the Football League Fourth Division and their 52nd season overall in the Football League.

It was one of the most successful seasons in County's history. Finishing in third place in the Fourth Division the club attained promotion to the Football League Third Division for the 1980–81 season. After winning the Welsh Cup this season, County also earned a place in the UEFA Cup Winners' Cup for the 1980–81 season.

== Season review ==
=== Results summary ===
Overall								Home						Away					
Pld	W	D	L	GF	GA	GD	Pts	W	D	L	GF	GA	GD	W	D	L	GF	GA	GD
46	27	7	12	56	59	−3	61	16	5	2	47	22	+25	11	2	10	9	37	−28

Source: rsssf.com

=== Results by round ===
Round	1	2	3	4	5	6	7	8	9	10	11	12	13	14	15	16	17	18	19	20	21	22	23	24	25	26	27	28	29	30	31	32	33	34	35	36	37	38	39	40	41	42	43	44	45	46
Ground	H	A	A	H	A	H	H	A	H	A	A	H	H	A	A	H	A	H	H	A	H	A	H	H	A	H	H	A	H	H	A	A	H	A	H	A	H	H	A	A	H	A	A	H	A	A
Result	W	W	L	W	L	L	W	W	D	L	L	W	W	W	W	W	L	W	D	W	W	D	W	D	L	L	W	L	D	D	L	W	W	W	W	W	W	W	W	W	W	D	L	W	L	W
Position	8	3	8	6	7	9	7	6	8	8	10	8	8	8	4	5	6	5	6	5	4	5	2	4	5	4	4	4	4	4	5	5	5	5	5	5	4	5	5	3	3	3	4	4	4	3

Updated to match(es) played on 3 May 1980. Source: statto.com
A = Away; H = Home; W = Win; D = Draw; L = Loss

== Fixtures and results ==
=== Fourth Division ===
Date	Opponents	Venue	Result	Scorers	Attendance
18 Aug 1979	Port Vale	H	2–1	Vaughan, Goddard	4,008
21 Aug 1979	Aldershot	A	1–0	Moore	3,537
25 Aug 1979	Bournemouth	A	2–3	Oakes, Goddard	5,428
1 Sep 1979	York City	H	2–0	Oakes, Goddard	3,818
8 Sep 1979	Huddersfield Town	A	1–2	Oakes	3,134
15 Sep 1979	Bradford City	H	1–2	Vaughan	4,089
18 Sep 1979	Northampton Town	H	2–1	Tynan, Goddard (P)	3,185
22 Sep 1979	Doncaster Rovers	A	3–1	Thompson, Tynan, Goddard (P)	3,238
29 Sep 1979	Lincoln City	H	1–1	OG	4,035
2 Oct 1979	Northampton Town	A	2–3	Bailey, Warriner	2,346
6 Oct 1979	Halifax Town	A	1–2	Goddard	2,540
9 Oct 1979	Aldershot	H	4–2	Oakes, OG, Aldridge 2	3,782
13 Oct 1979	Tranmere Rovers	H	2–0	Aldridge, Lowndes	4,052
20 Oct 1979	Scunthorpe United	A	3–1	Aldridge 2, Lowndes	1,875
23 Oct 1979	Portsmouth	A	2–0	Lowndes, Oakes	20,755
27 Oct 1979	Wigan Athletic	H	3–2	Tynan 2, Oakes	4,914
3 Nov 1979	Port Vale	A	0–2		2,980
6 Nov 1979	Portsmouth	H	4–3	Oakes, Aldridge, Tynan 2	7,115
10 Nov 1979	Crewe Alexandra	H	1–1	D.Bruton	4,718
17 Nov 1979	Stockport County	A	5–0	Oakes, D.Bruton, Aldridge 3	3,407
1 Dec 1979	Darlington	H	4–0	Lowndes 2, Oakes, Relish	4,127
8 Dec 1979	Hartlepool United	A	0–0		2,587
15 Dec 1979	Scunthorpe United	H	2–1	Walden, D.Bruton	4,158
21 Dec 1979	Peterborough United	H	1–1	Tynan	4,653
26 Dec 1979	Torquay United	A	0–2		5,236
29 Dec 1979	Walsall	H	0–1		7,452
1 Jan 1980	Hereford United	H	1–0	Vaughan (P)	7,213
12 Jan 1980	York City	A	1–2	Aldridge	2,248
18 Jan 1980	Huddersfield Town	H	2–2	Oakes, M.Bruton	4,851
26 Jan 1980	Bournemouth	H	0–0		4,833
16 Feb 1980	Lincoln City	A	1–2	Lowndes	3,346
22 Feb 1980	Tranmere Rovers	A	2–0	Vaughan 2 (1P)	2,056
26 Feb 1980	Doncaster Rovers	H	2–1	Gwyther, Lowndes	4,652
8 Mar 1980	Wigan Athletic	A	1–0	Oakes	6,128
14 Mar 1980	Halifax Town	H	5–2	Gwyther 2, Vaughan 2 (1P), Aldridge	4,777
22 Mar 1980	Crewe Alexandra	A	3–0	Vaughan (P), D.Bruton, Gwyther	2,595
29 Mar 1980	Stockport County	H	3–1	Gwyther, Moore, Vaughan (P)	4,727
5 Apr 1980	Torquay United	H	3–0	Moore, Gwyther, Vaughan	6,513
7 Apr 1980	Hereford United	A	2–0	Vaughan, Gwyther	7,945
8 Apr 1980	Peterborough United	A	1–0	Vaughan	5,033
12 Apr 1980	Rochdale	H	1–0	Moore	8,113
19 Apr 1980	Darlington	A	1–1	Moore	1,906
22 Apr 1980	Bradford City	A	0–3		8,853
26 Apr 1980	Hartlepool United	H	1–0	Aldridge	8,373
29 Apr 1980	Rochdale	A	0–2		1,616
3 May 1980	Walsall	A	4–2	Aldridge 2, Gwyther, Tynan	9,251

=== FA Cup ===
Round	Date	Opponents	Venue	Result	Scorers	Attendance
1	24 Nov 1979	Portsmouth	Fratton Park	0–1		19,459

=== Football League Cup ===
Round	Date	Opponents	Venue	Result	Scorers	Attendance	Aggregate
1–1	11 Aug 1979	Plymouth Argyle	Somerton Park	1–0	T.Tynan	4,574	
1–2	14 Aug 1979	Plymouth Argyle	Home Park	0–2		4,505	1–2

=== Welsh Cup ===
Round	Date	Opponents	Venue	Result	Scorers	Attendance	Notes
4	22 Jan 1980	Cardiff City	Somerton Park	2–0	J.Aldridge, T.Tynan	7,709	
5	4 Mar 1980	Wrexham	Racecourse Ground	1–0	S.Lowndes	4,468	
SF	25 Mar 1980	Merthyr Tydfil	Somerton Park	3–1	J.Aldridge, D.Gwyther 2	6,754	

Final

First Leg

6 May 1980
19:45 BST

Newport County	2–1	Shrewsbury Town
Tynan 2	Report	Own goal

Somerton Park, Newport
Attendance: 9,950
Referee: R Bridges (Deeside)

Newport County	Shrewsbury Town

NEWPORT COUNTY:
GK	1	(England) Gary Plumley
DF	2	(England) Richard Walden
FW	3	(England) Tommy Tynan
MF	4	(England) Grant Davies
DF	5	(England) Keith Oakes (c)
MF	6	(England) Neil Bailey
MF	7	(Wales) Nigel Vaughan
MF	8	(Wales) Steve Lowndes
FW	9	(Wales) Dave Gwyther
FW	10	(England) John Aldridge
FW	11	(England) Kevin Moore
Substitute:
MF	12	(Scotland) Bobby Ward
Manager:
(England) Len Ashurst

SHREWSBURY TOWN:
GK	1	(England) R Wardle
DF	2	(Scotland) Jack Keay
DF	3	(England) C Leonard
DF	4	(England) Graham Turner
DF	5	(England) C Griffin
MF	6	(England) Jake King
MF	7	(England) David Tong
MF	8	(England) Ian Atkins
FW	9	(England) Steve Biggins
FW	10	(England) John Dungworth
DF	11	(Scotland) Paul Maguire
Substitute:
DF	12	(England) Steve Cross
Manager:
(England) Graham Turner

MATCH RULES

- 90 minutes.
- 30 minutes of extra-time if necessary.
- Replay if scores still level.
- One named substitute.
- Maximum of one substitution.

Second Leg

12 May 1980
19:45 BST

Shrewsbury Town	0–3	Newport County
	Report	Tynan; Lowndes; Gwyther

Gay Meadow, Shrewsbury
Attendance: 8,993
Referee: R Bridges (Deeside)

Shrewsbury Town	Newport County

SHREWSBURY TOWN:
GK	1	(England) R Wardle
DF	2	(England) Jake King
DF	3	(England) C Leonard
DF	4	(Scotland) Brian Coyne
DF	5	(England) C Griffin
MF	6	(Scotland) Jack Keay
MF	7	(England) David Tong
MF	8	(England) Ian Atkins
FW	9	(England) Steve Biggins
FW	10	(England) John Dungworth
DF	11	(Scotland) Paul Maguire
Substitute:
DF	12	(England) Steve Cross
Manager:
(England) Graham Turner

NEWPORT COUNTY:
GK	1	(England) Gary Plumley
DF	2	(England) Richard Walden
FW	3	(England) Tommy Tynan
MF	4	(England) Grant Davies
DF	5	(England) Keith Oakes (c)
MF	6	(England) Neil Bailey
MF	7	(Wales) Nigel Vaughan
MF	8	(Wales) Steve Lowndes
FW	9	(Wales) Dave Gwyther
FW	10	(England) John Aldridge
FW	11	(England) Kevin Moore
Substitutes:
MF	12	(Scotland) Bobby Ward
Manager:
(England) Len Ashurst

MATCH RULES

- 90 minutes.
- 30 minutes of extra-time if necessary.
- Replay if scores still level.
- One named substitute.
- Maximum of one substitution.

== League table ==
Pos	Team	Pld	W	D	L	GF	GA	GD	Pts	Promotion
1	Huddersfield Town (C, P)	46	27	12	7	101	48	+53	66	Promotion to the Third Division
2	Walsall (P)	46	23	18	5	75	47	+28	64	Promotion to the Third Division
3	Newport County (P)	46	27	7	12	83	50	+33	61	Cup Winners' Cup first round and promotion to the Third Division
4	Portsmouth (P)	46	24	12	10	91	49	+42	60	Promotion to the Third Division
5	Bradford City	46	24	12	10	77	50	+27	60	

(C) Champions; (P) Promoted
