= 1980 Welsh Cup final =

1980 Football Association of Wales Challenge Cup final
- Event: 1979–80 Welsh Cup
| Newport County | Shrewsbury Town |
| 5 | 1 |

First Leg
| Newport County | Shrewsbury Town |
| 2 | 1 |
- Date: 6 May 1980
- Venue: Somerton Park, Newport
- Attendance: 9,950

Second Leg
| Shrewsbury Town | Newport County |
| 0 | 3 |
- Date: 12 May 1980
- Venue: Gay Meadow, Shrewsbury
- Attendance: 8,993

The 1980 Welsh Cup final was the final of the 93rd season of the main domestic football cup competition in Wales, the Welsh Cup. The final was contested between Newport County and Shrewsbury Town over two legs. Newport County won 5–1 on aggregate, winning both legs.

== Route to the final ==
=== Newport County ===
Newport County scores are shown first in every match

| Round | Opposition | Score | Venue |
|---|---|---|---|
| 4 | Cardiff City | 2–0 | Somerton Park |
| 5 | Wrexham | 1–0 | Racecourse Ground |
| SF | Merthyr Tydfil | 3–1 | Somerton Park |

=== Shrewsbury Town ===
Shrewsbury Town scores are shown first in every match

| Round | Opposition | Score | Venue | Notes |
|---|---|---|---|---|
| 4 | Oswestry Town | 2–2 | Gay Meadow | |
| 4r | Oswestry Town | 6–1 | Victoria Road | |
| 5 | Nantlle Vale | 4–1 | Gay Meadow | Nantlle Vale conceded home advantage |
| SF | Swansea City | 2–2 | Vetch Field | |
| SFr | Swansea City | 2–2 | Gay Meadow | Shrewsbury Town win 6–5 on penalties |

== Matches ==
=== First leg ===
6 May 1980
19:45 BST

| Newport County | 2–1 | Shrewsbury Town |
|---|---|---|
| Tynan | Report | Own goal |

Somerton Park, Newport
Attendance: 9,950
Referee: R Bridges (Deeside)

| Newport County | Shrewsbury Town |

NEWPORT COUNTY:
| GK | 1 | (England) Gary Plumley |
| DF | 2 | (England) Richard Walden |
| FW | 3 | (England) Tommy Tynan |
| MF | 4 | (England) Grant Davies |
| DF | 5 | (England) Keith Oakes (c) |
| MF | 6 | (England) Neil Bailey |
| MF | 7 | (Wales) Nigel Vaughan |
| MF | 8 | (Wales) Steve Lowndes |
| FW | 9 | (Wales) Dave Gwyther |
| FW | 10 | (England) John Aldridge |
| FW | 11 | (England) Kevin Moore |
Substitute:
| MF | 12 | (Scotland) Bobby Ward |
Manager:
(England) Len Ashurst

SHREWSBURY TOWN:
| GK | 1 | (England) R Wardle |
| DF | 2 | (Scotland) Jack Keay |
| DF | 3 | (England) C Leonard |
| DF | 4 | (England) Graham Turner |
| DF | 5 | (England) C Griffin |
| MF | 6 | (England) Jake King |
| MF | 7 | (England) David Tong |
| MF | 8 | (England) Ian Atkins |
| FW | 9 | (England) Steve Biggins |
| FW | 10 | (England) John Dungworth |
| DF | 11 | (Scotland) Paul Maguire |
Substitute:
| DF | 12 | (England) Steve Cross |
Manager:
(England) Graham Turner

MATCH RULES

- 90 minutes.
- 30 minutes of extra-time if necessary.
- Replay if scores still level.
- One named substitute.
- Maximum of one substitution.

=== Second leg ===
12 May 1980
19:45 BST

| Shrewsbury Town | 0–3 | Newport County |
|---|---|---|
| | Report | Tynan; Lowndes; Gwyther |

Gay Meadow, Shrewsbury
Attendance: 8,993
Referee: R Bridges (Deeside)

| Shrewsbury Town | Newport County |

SHREWSBURY TOWN:
| GK | 1 | (England) R Wardle |
| DF | 2 | (England) Jake King |
| DF | 3 | (England) C Leonard |
| DF | 4 | (Scotland) Brian Coyne |
| DF | 5 | (England) C Griffin |
| MF | 6 | (Scotland) Jack Keay |
| MF | 7 | (England) David Tong |
| MF | 8 | (England) Ian Atkins |
| FW | 9 | (England) Steve Biggins |
| FW | 10 | (England) John Dungworth |
| DF | 11 | (Scotland) Paul Maguire |
Substitute:
| DF | 12 | (England) Steve Cross |
Manager:
(England) Graham Turner

NEWPORT COUNTY:
| GK | 1 | (England) Gary Plumley |
| DF | 2 | (England) Richard Walden |
| FW | 3 | (England) Tommy Tynan |
| MF | 4 | (England) Grant Davies |
| DF | 5 | (England) Keith Oakes (c) |
| MF | 6 | (England) Neil Bailey |
| MF | 7 | (Wales) Nigel Vaughan |
| MF | 8 | (Wales) Steve Lowndes |
| FW | 9 | (Wales) Dave Gwyther |
| FW | 10 | (England) John Aldridge |
| FW | 11 | (England) Kevin Moore |
Substitutes:
| MF | 12 | (Scotland) Bobby Ward |
Manager:
(England) Len Ashurst

MATCH RULES

- 90 minutes.
- 30 minutes of extra-time if necessary.
- Replay if scores still level.
- One named substitute.
- Maximum of one substitution.
