= 1984–85 Cardiff City F.C. season =

Welsh football club season

Cardiff City
1984–85 season
- Chairman: Jack Leonard
- Manager: Jimmy Goodfellow/Alan Durban
- Football League Second Division: 21st
- FA Cup: 3rd round
- League Cup: 2nd round
- Welsh Cup: 4th round
- Top goalscorer: League: Nigel Vaughan (15); All: Nigel Vaughan (17)
- Highest home attendance: 6,893 (v Leeds United, 12 September 1984)
- Lowest home attendance: 2,564 (v Middlesbrough, 2 February 1985)
- Average home league attendance: 4,372

The 1984–85 season was Cardiff City F.C.'s 58th season in the Football League. They competed in the 22-team Division Two, then the second tier of English football, finishing twenty-first, suffering relegation to Division Three.

The season also saw the retirement of Phil Dwyer, whose 13-year spell at the club saw him become the record appearance holder.

== Players ==
Note: Flags indicate national team as defined under FIFA eligibility rules; some limited exceptions apply. Players may hold more than one non-FIFA nationality.

Pos.	Nation	Player
GK	WAL	David Felgate
GK	ENG	Gary Plumley
GK	WAL	Mel Rees
GK	ENG	Lee Smelt
DF	WAL	Paul Bodin
DF	WAL	Phil Dwyer
DF	WAL	Francis Ford
DF	ENG	Mike Ford
DF	WAL	David Grant
DF	WAL	Vaughan Jones
DF	SCO	Jake King
DF	ENG	Jimmy Mullen
DF	ENG	Colin Smith
MF	WAL	Karl Elsey
MF	WAL	Brian Flynn

Pos.	Nation	Player
MF	ENG	Gerry Francis
MF	ENG	Roger Gibbins
MF	ENG	David Hamilton
MF	IRL	Mick Martin
MF	ENG	Paul McLoughlin
MF	WAL	Tarki Micallef
MF	ENG	John Seasman
MF	ENG	David Tong
MF	WAL	Nigel Vaughan
MF	WAL	Dai Withers
FW	IRL	Paul Bannon
FW	ENG	Kevin Meacock
FW	WAL	Dean Saunders
FW	ENG	Graham Withey
FW	WAL	Jon Woods

== League standings ==
Pos	Team	Pld	W	D	L	GF	GA	GD	Pts	Relegation
18	Sheffield United	42	10	14	18	54	66	−12	44	
19	Middlesbrough	42	10	10	22	41	57	−16	40	
20	Notts County (R)	42	10	7	25	45	73	−28	37	Relegation to the Third Division
21	Cardiff City (R)	42	9	8	25	47	79	−32	35	Relegation to the Third Division
22	Wolverhampton Wanderers (R)	42	8	9	25	37	79	−42	33	Relegation to the Third Division

Rules for classification: 1) Points; 2) Goal difference; 3) Goals scored
(R) Relegated

=== Results by round ===
Round	1	2	3	4	5	6	7	8	9	10	11	12	13	14	15	16	17	18	19	20	21	22	23	24	25	26	27	28	29	30	31	32	33	34	35	36	37	38	39	40	41	42
Ground	H	A	H	H	A	A	H	A	H	A	A	H	A	H	H	A	H	A	H	H	A	A	H	H	A	A	H	A	A	H	H	A	A	H	A	H	A	H	H	A	H	A
Result	L	L	L	W	L	L	L	L	L	W	L	L	L	D	W	L	L	D	L	L	L	D	D	W	L	W	D	L	W	L	L	D	D	L	D	L	W	W	W	L	L	L
Position		20	21	17	19	20	20	21	22	21	21	21	22	21	21	21	21		22	22	22	22	22	22	22	22	21	21	21	21	22	22	22	22	22	22	22	20	20	20		21
Points	0	0	0	3	3	3	3	3	3	6	6	6	6	7	10	10	10	11	11	11	11	12	13	16	16	19	20	20	23	23	23	24	25	25	26	26	29	32	35	35	35	35

Source: Competitive matches
A = Away; H = Home; W = Win; D = Draw; L = Loss

== Fixtures and results ==
=== Second Division ===
25 August 1984 1	Cardiff City	0–3	Charlton Athletic	Cardiff
15:00			22' Derek Hales; 52' (pen.) Derek Hales; 68' Derek Hales	Stadium: Ninian Park; Attendance: 5,020; Referee: LM Robinson (Sutton Coldfield)

1 September 1984 2	Sheffield United	2–1	Cardiff City	Sheffield
15:00	Keith Edwards 23'; Tom Heffernan 71'		58' Roger Gibbins	Stadium: Bramall Lane; Attendance: 12,332; Referee: J Ashworth

8 September 1984 3	Cardiff City	2–4	Brighton & Hove Albion	Cardiff
15:00	John Seasman 55' (pen.); Karl Elsey 65'		9' Frank Worthington; 40' Terry Connor; 47' Steve Penney; 68' Gary Howlett	Stadium: Ninian Park; Attendance: 4,687; Referee: GJ Napthine

12 September 1984 4	Cardiff City	2–1	Leeds United	Cardiff
19:45	Paul Bodin 26'; Phil Dwyer 77'		60' Scott Sellars	Stadium: Ninian Park; Attendance: 6,893; Referee: TJ Holbrook (Walsall)

15 September 1984 5	Barnsley	2–0	Cardiff City	Barnsley
	David Geddis 21' (pen.); David Geddis 68'			Stadium: Oakwell; Attendance: 4,692

18 September 1984 6	Blackburn Rovers	2–1	Cardiff City	Blackburn
19:30	Chris Thompson 48'; Simon Barker 90'		Kevin Summerfield	Stadium: Ewood Park; Attendance: 5,203

22 September 1984 7	Cardiff City	0–3	Manchester City	Cardiff
			Tony Cunningham; Gordon Smith; Clive Wilson	Stadium: Ninian Park; Attendance: 6,089; Referee: Vic Callow (Solihull)

29 September 1984 8	Middlesbrough	3–2	Cardiff City	Middlesbrough
15:00	David Currie 59'; David Mills 62'; David Currie 77'		65' John Seasman; 80' Nigel Vaughan	Stadium: Ayresome Park; Attendance: 4,266

6 October 1984 9	Cardiff City	1–2	Portsmouth	Cardiff
15:00	Karl Elsey 25'		48' Scott McGarvey; 70' Neil Webb	Stadium: Ninian Park; Attendance: 6,201; Referee: Keren Barratt (Coventry)

14 October 1984 10	Notts County	0–2	Cardiff City	Nottingham
15:00			Nigel Vaughan; Nigel Vaughan	Stadium: Meadow Lane; Attendance: 5,893; Referee: AW Ward

20 October 1984 11	Fulham	3–2	Cardiff City	London
15:00	Gordon Davies; Robert Wilson 19'; Kevin Lock 53' (pen.)		Colin Smith; 89' Karl Elsey	Stadium: Craven Cottage; Attendance: 5,358; Referee: A Seville

27 October 1984 12	Cardiff City	2–4	Grimsby Town	Cardiff
15:00	Nigel Vaughan (40s); Nigel Vaughan 20'		40' Gary Lund; 43' Paul Wilkinson; 53' Paul Emson; Kevin Drinkell	Stadium: Ninian Park; Attendance: 3,607; Referee: Alan Robinson (Portsmouth)

3 November 1984 13	Wolverhampton Wanderers	3–0	Cardiff City	Wolverhampton
	Mark Buckland 62'; Tony Evans; John Pender			Stadium: Molineux; Attendance: 7,537; Referee: LR Dilkes

10 November 1984 14	Cardiff City	2–2	Oldham Athletic	Cardiff
15:00	Nigel Vaughan 89'; Nigel Vaughan 90'		67' Derrick Parker; 80' Roger Palmer	Stadium: Ninian Park; Attendance: 3,429; Referee: Roger Milford (Bristol)

17 November 1984 15	Cardiff City	2–1	Carlisle United	Cardiff
15:00	Nigel Vaughan; David Tong 90'		Ian Bishop	Stadium: Ninian Park; Attendance: 3,005; Referee: Malcolm Cotton (Surrey)

24 November 1984 16	Huddersfield	2–1	Cardiff City	Huddersfield
15:00	Paul Jones 44' (pen.); Dale Tempest 67'		29' Nigel Vaughan	Stadium: Leeds Road; Attendance: 6,495

1 December 1984 17	Cardiff City	1–2	Birmingham City	Cardiff
15:00	Karl Elsey 20'		19' Tony Morley; 65' Tony Morley	Stadium: Ninian Park; Attendance: 5,057; Referee: Brian Stevens (Stonehouse)

9 December 1984 18	Crystal Palace	1–1	Cardiff City	London
15:00	Trevor Aylott		80' Roger Gibbins	Stadium: Selhurst Park; Attendance: 6,004

15 December 1984 19	Cardiff City	1–3	Wimbledon	Cardiff
	Phil Dwyer 49'		29' Stewart Evans; 61' Stewart Evans; Kevin Gage	Stadium: Ninian Park; Attendance: 2,976; Referee: Ron Groves (Weston-Super-Mare)

22 December 1984 20	Cardiff City	1–3	Sheffield United	Cardiff
	Graham Withey		9' Mel Eves; 52' Keith Edwards; 67' Keith Edwards	Stadium: Ninian Park; Attendance: 3,366; Referee: Lester Shapter (Torquay)

26 December 1984 21	Oxford United	4–0	Cardiff City	Oxford
15:00	Billy Hamilton 48'; John Aldridge 50'; John Aldridge 53'; Billy Hamilton 74'			Stadium: Manor Ground; Attendance: 12,237; Referee: Allan Gunn (Burgess Hill)

29 December 1984 22	Leeds United	1–1	Cardiff City	Leeds
	Peter Lorimer 42' (pen.)		88' Graham Withey	Stadium: Elland Road; Attendance: 11,798; Referee: Ken Walmsley (Blackpool)

1 January 1985 23	Cardiff City	0–0	Shrewsbury Town	Cardiff
				Stadium: Ninian Park; Attendance: 4,609; Referee: Leslie Burden (Dorset)

2 February 1985 24	Cardiff City	2–1	Middlesbrough	Cardiff
	Kevin Meacock 10'; Kevin Meacock 49'		43' David Currie	Stadium: Ninian Park; Attendance: 2,564; Referee: Peter Vanes (Warley, Midlands)

9 February 1985 25	Brighton & Hove Albion	1–0	Cardiff City	Brighton
15:00	Chris Hutchings 60'			Stadium: Goldstone Ground; Attendance: 7,337; Referee: David Axcell (Southend)

15 February 1985 26	Oldham Athletic	0–1	Cardiff City	Oldham
15:00			Nigel Vaughan	Stadium: Boundary Park; Attendance: 3,952

23 February 1985 27	Cardiff City	0–0	Wolverhampton Wanderers	Cardiff
				Stadium: Ninian Park; Attendance: 4,694; Referee: Alan Robinson (Fareham)

2 March 1985 28	Grimsby Town	6–3	Cardiff City	Grimsby
15:00	Kevin Drinkell 17'; Phil Bonnyman 24' (pen.); Gary Lund; Phil Bonnyman 57' (pen.); Kevin Drinkell 84'; Paul Wilkinson 89'		45' (pen.) Jimmy Mullen; 61' Graham Withey; 89' Roger Gibbins	Attendance: 3,930; Referee: George Tyson (Sunderland)

5 March 1985 29	Charlton Athletic	1–4	Cardiff City	London
19:45	Ronnie Moore 87'		(pen.) Jimmy Mullen; Graham Withey; Graham Withey; Phil Dwyer	Stadium: The Valley; Attendance: 3,930

9 March 1985 30	Cardiff City	0–2	Fulham	Cardiff
			27' Danny Wilson; 46' (pen.) Kevin Lock	Stadium: Ninian Park; Attendance: 4,399; Referee: John Lovatt (Crewe)

17 March 1985 31	Cardiff City	1–4	Notts County	Cardiff
	Roger Gibbins		Tony Daws; Rachid Harkouk; Alan Young; Alan Young	Stadium: Ninian Park; Attendance: 3,631; Referee: David Letts (Basingstoke)

23 March 1985 32	Portsmouth	0–0	Cardiff City	Portsmouth
15:00				Stadium: Fratton Park; Attendance: 13,602

30 March 1985 33	Manchester City	2–2	Cardiff City	Manchester
15:00	Paul Simpson; Steve Kinsey		49' Graham Withey; 64' Roger Gibbins	Stadium: Maine Road; Attendance: 20,047; Referee: Keith Hackett (Sheffield)

6 April 1985 34	Cardiff City	0–2	Oxford United	Cardiff
			4' John Aldridge; 56' Jeremy Charles	Stadium: Ninian Park; Attendance: 6,686; Referee: Trevor Jones (Macclesfield)

9 April 1985 35	Shrewsbury Town	0–0	Cardiff City	Shrewsbury
19:30				Stadium: Gay Meadow; Attendance: 3,929

13 April 1985 36	Cardiff City	1–2	Blackburn Rovers	Cardiff
	Nigel Vaughan 50'		5' Ian Miller; 70' Simon Garner	Stadium: Ninian Park; Attendance: 3,240; Referee: Darryl Reeves (Uxbridge)

20 April 1985 37	Carlisle United	0–1	Cardiff City	Carlisle
15:00			57' Nigel Vaughan	Stadium: Brunton Park; Attendance: 2,651

23 April 1985 38	Cardiff City	3–0	Barnsley	Cardiff
19:45	Nigel Vaughan; Mike Ford 41'; Nigel Vaughan			Stadium: Ninian Park; Attendance: 3,044; Referee: Ray Lewis (Great Bookham, Surrey)

27 April 1985 39	Cardiff City	3–0	Huddersfield	Cardiff
	Nigel Vaughan 40'; Nigel Vaughan 51'; Kevin Meacock 85'			Stadium: Ninian Park; Attendance: 3,414; Referee: Ken Baker (Rugby)

4 May 1985 40	Birmingham City	2–0	Cardiff City	Birmingham
	Robert Hopkins 11'; Andy Kennedy 46'			Stadium: St Andrew's; Attendance: 15,570

6 May 1985 41	Cardiff City	0–3	Crystal Palace	Cardiff
			Trevor Aylott; Alan Irvine; Steve Galloway	Stadium: Ninian Park; Attendance: 5,207; Referee: John Key (Rotherham)

11 May 1985 42	Wimbledon	2–1	Cardiff City	London
15:00	Brian Gayle; David Martin		60' Tarki Micallef	Stadium: Plough Lane; Attendance: 3,252

=== Milk Cup ===
31 August 1984 Round 1 (First Leg)	Exeter City	1–0	Cardiff City	Exeter
19:45	Keith Viney 53' (pen.)			Stadium: St James Park; Attendance: 3,469; Referee: Dennis Hedges (Headington, Oxford)

15 September 1984 round 1 (Second Leg)	Cardiff City	2–0 (2–1 agg.)	Exeter City	Cardiff
	Nicky Marker (o.g.); Roger Gibbins 44'			Stadium: Ninian Park; Attendance: 2,026; Referee: Danny Vickers (Ilford)

4 September 1984 Round 2 (First Leg)	Watford	3–1	Cardiff City	Watford
19:45	John Barnes 44', 55', 86'		25' Roger Gibbins	Stadium: Vicarage Road; Attendance: 12,884; Referee: John Martin (Alton, Hampshire)

26 October 1984 Round 2 (Second Leg)	Cardiff City	1–0 (2–3 agg.)	Watford	Cardiff
	David Grant 48'			Stadium: Ninian Park; Attendance: 4,607; Referee: Eric Read (Bristol)

=== FA Cup ===
21 January 1985 Round 3	Gillingham	2–1	Cardiff City	Gillingham
15:00	Martin Robinson 42'; John Leslie 82'	Gillingham report	68' Graham Withey	Stadium: Priestfield Stadium; Attendance: 5,452; Referee: Trevor Spencer (Wootton Bassett)

=== Welsh Cup ===
27 November 1984 Round 3	Cardiff City	5–0	Merthyr Tydfil	Cardiff
19:45	David Tong 18'; Tarki Micallef 60'; Nigel Vaughan 68', 73'; Karl Elsey 80'			Stadium: Ninian Park; Attendance: 1,399; Referee: John Deakin (Bedford)

30 January 1985 Round 4	Cardiff City	0–4	Hereford United	Cardiff
			Goal	Stadium: Ninian Park; Attendance: 2,075

== Bibliography ==
- Hayes, Dean (2006). The Who's Who of Cardiff City. Breedon Books. ISBN 1-85983-462-0.
- Crooks, John (1986). Cardiff City Chronology 1920-86. John Crooks. ISBN 0-9511984-0-8.
- Shepherd, Richard (2002). The Definitive Cardiff City F.C. Tony Brown. ISBN 1-899-46817-X.
- Crooks, John (1992). Cardiff City Football Club: Official History of the Bluebirds. Yore Publications. ISBN 0-9513321-8-X.
- "Football Club History Database – Cardiff City". Archived from the original on 30 December 2008.
- Welsh Football Data Archive
