= Jimmy Goodfellow =

English footballer (1943–2020)

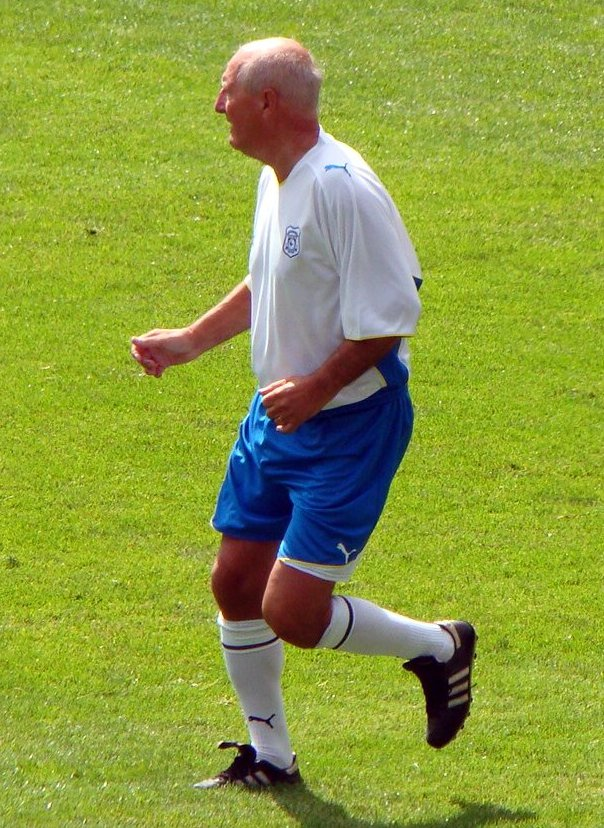
- Goodfellow playing for Cardiff City Legends in July 2009

Personal information
- Full name: James Goodfellow
- Date of birth: 16 September 1943
- Place of birth: Bishop Auckland, England
- Date of death: 22 April 2020 (aged 76)
- Place of death: Newport, Wales
- Height: 5 ft 7 in (1.70 m)
- Position: Midfielder

Youth career
- 195?–1960: Newcastle United

Senior career*
Years	Team	Apps	(Gls)
1960–196?	Consett		
1962–1965	Crook Town		
1965–1966	Bishop Auckland		
1966–1969	Port Vale	85	(10)
1969–1974	Workington	199	(15)
1974–1978	Rotherham United	192	(8)
1978–1979	Stockport County	3	(0)
Total		479	(33)

Managerial career
- 1984: Cardiff City
- * Club domestic league appearances and goals

James Goodfellow (16 September 1943 – 22 April 2020) was an English professional footballer and manager. A midfielder, he scored 39 goals in 535 league and cup appearances in a 13-year career in the English Football League.

He spent his youth with Newcastle United but did not earn a professional contract. Instead, he played amateur and semi-professional football with Consett, Crook Town, and Bishop Auckland; he won the FA Amateur Cup with Crook Town in 1964. He entered the Football League with Port Vale in 1966, before transferring to Workington in May 1969. He moved on to Rotherham United in January 1974 for a £3,000 fee. He helped the "Millers" to win promotion out of the Fourth Division in 1974–75. He ended his playing career after spending the 1978–79 season with Stockport County. He then took up coaching with Newport County, Cardiff City, Plymouth Argyle, and Sunderland. He served as Cardiff's manager for six months in 1984 and later worked behind the scenes at the club until his retirement in May 2008.

== Playing career ==
=== Early career ===
Goodfellow signed for Newcastle United, despite being a Sunderland fan, but was released by the club at the age of 17 without making a first-team appearance. He moved into non-League football, signing for Consett, before moving to Northern League side Crook Town in March 1962. In 1964, he scored Crook Town's first goal at Wembley when he scored against Enfield in the Amateur Cup final victory; the headed goal was credited to Matt Lumsdon in some newspaper reports. Goodfellow became unhappy with the way the team was selected at Crook Town, being chosen by a committee rather than the club's manager, and agreed to join Bishop Auckland when manager Lawrie McMenemy asked him to do so. During his time as a semi-professional and amateur player he worked at the Vickers naval yard on the River Tyne.

=== Port Vale ===
Goodfellow got the call to move into league football at the age of 23 when he was signed to Jackie Mudie's Port Vale. He scored his first goal in the Fourth Division on 1 October 1966, in a 2–2 draw with Barrow at Holker Street. He went on to finish the 1966–67 campaign with seven goals in 28 appearances. Stanley Matthews then took charge at Vale Park, with disastrous consequences; Goodfellow scored twice in 31 games in 1967–68, as the club slipped to 18th place. New boss Gordon Lee then revitalised the club. However, after two goals in 36 games in 1968–69, Goodfellow joined Workington on a free transfer in May 1969.

=== Workington ===
The "Reds" finished just one place and one point above the re-election zone in 1969–70, before rising to tenth place in 1970–71. New boss George Aitken then led the club to sixth and 13th-place finishes in the 1971–72 and 1972–73 campaigns. Goodfellow scored 15 goals in 199 Fourth Division appearances in his time at Borough Park.

=== Rotherham United ===
Goodfellow signed for Rotherham United in January 1974 after being recommended to manager Jimmy McGuigan by Hartlepool United manager Len Ashurst, who was unable to pay the £3,000 fee Workington demanded. He scored on his Rotherham debut, the club's first ever Sunday game, a 2–1 defeat to Northampton Town. The "Millers" finished 15th in 1973–74, before winning promotion with a third-place finish in 1974–75 with Goodfellow forming part of a highly effective left-sided triangle along with left-back John Breckin and left-winger Alan Crawford. He went on to captain Rotherham as they adjusted well to the Third Division, featuring in all 50 games as the club posted a 16th-place finish in 1975–76. Rotherham missed out on promotion due to a slightly inferior goal difference to Crystal Palace in 1976–77. Rotherham then dropped to just one position and three points above the relegation zone in the 1977–78 campaign. Though Goodfellow missed just three games at Millmoor, he was released in the summer.

=== Stockport County ===
He ended his playing career with Stockport County at the end of the 1978–79 season. He made just three Fourth Division appearances for Mike Summerbee's "Hatters", before departing Edgeley Park.

== Style of play ==
A highly consistent player, his one weakness was his lack of goals. Goodfellow self-deprecatingly described himself as "a non-running, non-tackling, non-heading midfielder".

== Coaching career ==
Len Ashurst asked Goodfellow to join him as his assistant manager at Newport County. The duo would go on to lead the "Exiles" to promotion out of the Fourth Division in the 1979–80 season, the Welsh Cup title in 1980, and to reach the quarter-finals of the European Cup Winners' Cup in 1981. However, he was sacked in November 1981. Ashurst himself was sacked three months later, and after being appointed as manager of Cardiff City in March 1982 he again installed Goodfellow as his assistant. Goodfellow helped Ashurst lead Cardiff to promotion into the Second Division in 1982–83. Ashurst would leave in March 1984 to take over at Sunderland, his hometown club. Goodfellow was appointed joint-caretaker manager of Cardiff, alongside senior player Jimmy Mullen. At the end of the season he was named as the club's permanent manager, with Mullen as his assistant. However, Goodfellow had a poor start to his tenure as City manager, losing eight of the first nine games of the 1984–85 season, and was sacked after just over two months in charge and replaced by Alan Durban. After his dismissal he joined Plymouth Argyle as physiotherapist, before joining up with Lawrie McMenemy again for an ill-fated spell at Sunderland.

Two years after leaving Ninian Park, he was asked to return to Cardiff as the club's physiotherapist and coach by then manager Frank Burrows. He remained in the backroom staff when manager Eddie May led Cardiff to the Third Division title in the 1992–93 season. Goodfellow would go on to serve the "Bluebirds" with distinction under a series of managers, and in 1998 he was given a testimonial match by the club against Manchester United, with Goodfellow himself being brought on in the final few minutes, at the age of 55. He retired in May 2008 and died on 22 April 2020 in Newport, aged 76.

== Career statistics ==
=== Playing statistics ===
Appearances and goals by club, season and competition
Club	Season	League			FA Cup		League Cup		Total	
Club	Season	Division	Apps	Goals	Apps	Goals	Apps	Goals	Apps	Goals
Port Vale	1966–67	Fourth Division	26	7	1	0	1	0	28	7
Port Vale	1967–68	Fourth Division	28	1	1	1	2	0	31	2
Port Vale	1968–69	Fourth Division	31	2	5	0	0	0	36	2
Port Vale	Total		85	10	7	1	3	0	95	11
Workington	1969–70	Fourth Division	46	4	2	1	2	0	50	5
Workington	1970–71	Fourth Division	44	1	4	2	2	0	50	3
Workington	1971–72	Fourth Division	46	4	2	1	1	0	49	5
Workington	1972–73	Fourth Division	44	4	4	2	2	0	50	6
Workington	1973–74	Fourth Division	19	2	1	0	0	0	20	2
Workington	Total		199	15	13	6	7	0	219	21
Rotherham United	1973–74	Fourth Division	19	3	0	0	0	0	19	3
Rotherham United	1974–75	Fourth Division	40	1	4	0	4	0	48	1
Rotherham United	1975–76	Third Division	46	2	2	1	2	0	50	2
Rotherham United	1976–77	Third Division	42	0	5	0	2	0	49	0
Rotherham United	1977–78	Third Division	45	2	4	0	4	0	53	2
Rotherham United	Total		192	8	15	1	12	0	219	9
Stockport County	1978–79	Fourth Division	3	0	0	0	2	0	5	0
Career total			479	33	35	8	24	0	538	41

=== Managerial statistics ===
Managerial record by team and tenure
Team	From	To	Record				
Team	From	To	P	W	D	L	Win %
Cardiff City	1 March 1984	27 September 1984	23	6	4	13	26.1
Total			23	6	4	13	26.1

== Honours ==
Crook Town

- FA Amateur Cup: 1964

Rotherham United

- Football League Fourth Division third-place promotion: 1974–75
