= 1983–84 Newport County A.F.C. season =

Welsh association football club season

Newport County
1983–84 season
- Chairman: Richard Ford
- Manager: Colin Addison
- Stadium: Somerton Park
- Third Division: 13th
- FA Cup: 3rd round
- League Cup: 1st round
- Welsh Cup: 5th round
- Top goalscorer: League: Aldridge (20); All: Aldridge (27)
- Highest home attendance: 5,459 vs Plymouth Argyle (FA Cup, 10 Jan 1984)
- Lowest home attendance: 1,849 vs Gillingham (27 March 1984)
- Average home league attendance: 3,125
Home colours	Away colours	Third colours

The 1983–84 season was Newport County's fourth consecutive season in the Third Division and their 56th season overall in the Football League.

== Season review ==
=== Results summary ===
Note: Three points for a win

Overall								Home						Away					
Pld	W	D	L	GF	GA	GD	Pts	W	D	L	GF	GA	GD	W	D	L	GF	GA	GD
46	16	14	16	58	75	−17	62	11	9	3	35	27	+8	5	5	13	23	48	−25

Last updated: 12 May 1984.

=== Results by round ===
Round	1	2	3	4	5	6	7	8	9	10	11	12	13	14	15	16	17	18	19	20	21	22	23	24	25	26	27	28	29	30	31	32	33	34	35	36	37	38	39	40	41	42	43	44	45	46
Ground	H	A	A	H	A	H	H	A	H	A	H	A	H	A	H	A	A	H	H	A	H	A	A	H	H	A	H	A	H	A	H	H	A	H	H	A	H	A	A	H	A	H	A	A	H	A
Result	W	L	L	W	L	D	D	W	D	W	W	W	W	D	D	D	L	W	L	D	W	L	L	W	L	D	D	L	W	W	D	D	D	L	W	L	W	L	W	W	L	D	L	L	D	L
Position	6	14	15	12	15	15	15	11	12	9	9	6	5	6	6	8	10	9	11	12	9	10	13	10	14	13	14	14	14	14	13	14	14	14	13	13	12	13	12	10	10	11	11	13	13	13

Updated to match(es) played on 12 May 1984. Source: statto.com
A = Away; H = Home; W = Win; D = Draw; L = Loss

== Fixtures and results ==
=== Third Division ===
Date	Opponents	Venue	Result	Scorers	Attendance
27 Aug 1983	Bristol Rovers	H	2–1	Vaughan, Aldridge	5,015
3 Sep 1983	Wimbledon	A	0–6		2,007
6 Sep 1983	Burnley	A	0–2		6,719
10 Sep 1983	Bradford City	H	4–3	Vaughan 2, Martinez, Aldridge	2,462
17 Sep 1983	Walsall	A	2–3	Vaughan, Elsey	2,818
24 Sep 1983	Scunthorpe United	H	1–1	Vaughan	2,679
27 Sep 1983	Preston North End	H	1–1	Aldridge	2,542
1 Oct 1983	Rotherham United	A	1–0	Aldridge	4,099
8 Oct 1983	Orient	H	0–0		3,213
15 Oct 1983	Bolton Wanderers	A	3–2	OG, Reid, Carter	4,928
18 Oct 1983	Lincoln City	H	1–0	Aldridge	3,450
22 Oct 1983	Exeter City	A	2–1	Aldridge 2	3,970
29 Oct 1983	Port Vale	H	2–1	Aldridge, Reid	3,829
1 Nov 1983	Millwall	A	1–1	Aldridge	4,352
5 Nov 1983	Southend United	H	1–1	Aldridge	3,769
12 Nov 1983	Hull City	A	0–0		7,853
26 Nov 1983	Oxford United	A	0–2		6,330
3 Dec 1983	Wigan Athletic	H	5–3	Aldridge 3, Reid, Lewis	3,169
17 Dec 1983	Sheffield United	H	0–2		4,295
26 Dec 1983	Bournemouth	A	1–1	Chamberlain	7,220
27 Dec 1983	Plymouth Argyle	H	2–0	Aldridge 2	5,154
31 Dec 1983	Brentford	A	0–2		4,631
14 Jan 1984	Bristol Rovers	A	0–4		6,041
22 Jan 1984	Walsall	H	3–1	Aldridge 2, Chamberlain	4,374
4 Feb 1984	Rotherham United	H	1–4	Aldridge	2,391
10 Feb 1984	Scunthorpe United	A	3–3	Lilygreen, V.Jones, Williams	2,879
14 Feb 1984	Millwall	H	1–1	Aldridge	2,070
18 Feb 1984	Port Vale	A	2–4	V.Jones, Lilygreen	3,437
25 Feb 1984	Exeter City	H	1–0	Aldridge	2,465
3 Mar 1984	Lincoln City	A	3–2	Reid 2, Oakes	1,780
6 Mar 1984	Wimbledon	H	1–1	Pratt	2,538
10 Mar 1984	Hull City	H	1–1	V.Jones	2,813
17 Mar 1984	Orient	A	2–2	Carter, Boyle	2,355
24 Mar 1984	Bolton Wanderers	H	2–3	Micallef, Lilygreen	2,436
27 Mar 1984	Gillingham	H	1–0	Carter	1,849
30 Mar 1984	Preston North End	A	0–2		3,534
7 Apr 1984	Burnley	H	1–0	V.Jones	2,306
14 Apr 1984	Wigan Athletic	A	0–1		2,903
20 Apr 1984	Plymouth Argyle	A	1–0	Green	7,654
21 Apr 1984	Bournemouth	H	2–1	Reid, Green	2,356
25 Apr 1984	Bradford City	A	0–1		3,347
28 Apr 1984	Oxford United	H	1–1	Carter	4,562
30 Apr 1984	Southend United	A	1–3	Pratt	2,108
5 May 1984	Gillingham	A	1–4	Micallef	3,073
7 May 1984	Brentford	H	1–1	Lilygreen	2,154
12 May 1984	Sheffield United	A	0–2		16,700

=== FA Cup ===
Round	Date	Opponents	Venue	Result	Scorers	Attendance
1	20 Nov 1983	Poole Town	A	0–0		4,521
1r	22 Nov 1983	Poole Town	H	3–1	Oakes, Aldridge, Lewis	3,090
2	10 Dec 1983	Harrow Borough	A	3–1	Martinez 2, Chamberlain	2,500
3	7 Jan 1984	Plymouth Argyle	A	2–2	Aldridge 2	6,789
3r	10 Jan 1984	Plymouth Argyle	H	0–1		5,459

=== Football League Cup ===
Round	Date	Opponents	Venue	Result	Scorers	Attendance	Notes
1–1	30 Aug 1983	Torquay United	H	2–3	Boyle, Aldridge	2,282	
1–2	14 Sep 1983	Torquay United	A	0–1		2,015	2–4 agg

=== Welsh Cup ===
Round	Date	Opponents	Venue	Result	Scorers	Attendance
3	29 Nov 1983	Bridgend Town	H	5–1	Relish, Boyle, Woodruff, Carter, R.Jones	1,494
4	17 Jan 1984	Lex XI	H	6–0	Aldridge 3, Relish, Reid, Lilygreen	1,077
5	7 Feb 1984	Wrexham	H	0–1		1,812

=== League table ===
Pos	Team	Pld	W	D	L	GF	GA	GD	Pts
11	Orient	46	18	9	19	71	81	−10	63
12	Burnley	46	16	14	16	76	61	+15	62
13	Newport County	46	16	14	16	58	75	−17	62
14	Lincoln City	46	17	10	19	59	62	−3	61
15	Wigan Athletic	46	16	13	17	46	56	−10	61
