= 1912–13 Newport County A.F.C. season =

Welsh association football club season

Newport County
1912–13 season
- Manager: Davy McDougall
- Stadium: Somerton Park
- Southern League Second Division: 10th
- Welsh Cup: 2nd preliminary round
- Top goalscorer: League: W.A. Fyfe (7); All: Fyfe/Holt (7)
Home colours	Away colours

The 1912–13 season was the first competitive season in the history of Newport County A.F.C.. Founded in 1912, the club was elected directly into the Southern League Second Division and competed in league and cup football for the first time. Newport County finished tenth in the Southern League Second Division and were eliminated in the early rounds of the Welsh Cup.

== Background ==
Newport County A.F.C. was formed in 1912 and entered competitive football in the Southern League Second Division for the 1912–13 season. The Southern League was one of the principal competitions in British football during the pre–First World War era. The club played its home matches at Somerton Park, Newport. Scottish footballer Davy McDougall served as the club's first player-manager during the season.

== Season review ==
=== League ===
==== Results summary ====
Note: Two points for a win

Overall								Home						Away					
Pld	W	D	L	GF	GA	Ave	Pts	W	D	L	GF	GA	Ave	W	D	L	GF	GA	Ave
24	7	5	12	29	36	0.81	19	6	1	5	25	17	1.47	1	4	7	4	19	0.21

Last updated: 19 Apr 1913.

== Fixtures and results ==
=== Southern League Second Division ===
Date	Opponents	Venue	Result	Scorers	Attendance
7 Sep 1912	Mid-Rhondda	H	3–0	McDougall, G. Fyfe, Vowles	5,000
14 Sep 1912	Cardiff City	A	0–2		8,000
21 Sep 1912	Swansea Town	H	0–1		5,000
28 Sep 1912	Llanelly	A	1–2	Hall	4,000
12 Oct 1912	Treharris	H	2–1	G. Fyfe, Holt	6,000
23 Nov 1912	Aberdare	H	2–2	Lean, G. Fyfe	
30 Nov 1912	Mardy	A	0–5		
7 Dec 1912	Ton Pentre	A	1–1	Lean	
25 Dec 1912	Southend United	A	0–1		11,000
28 Dec 1912	Llanelly	H	3–1	W.A. Fyfe 2, Holt	
16 Jan 1913	Mardy	H	1–2	W.A. Fyfe	
18 Jan 1913	Luton Town	H	5–1	W.A. Fyfe 2, G. Fyfe, Holt	
1 Feb 1913	Ton Pentre	H	4–1	W.A. Fyfe, Bowdler, Hall 2	
8 Feb 1913	Cardiff City	H	1–3	Holt	8,000
22 Feb 1913	Mid-Rhondda	A	1–0	Holt	
1 Mar 1913	Swansea Town	A	1–2	Hall	10,200
8 Mar 1913	Croydon Common	A	0–1		
15 Mar 1913	Croydon Common	H	1–2	Bowdler	
31 Mar 1913	Pontypridd	A	0–0		
3 Apr 1913	Treharris	A	0–0		
5 Apr 1913	Luton Town	A	0–5		
7 Apr 1913	Southend United	H	0–2		
12 Apr 1913	Pontypridd	H	3–1	Groves, W.A. Fyfe, Hall	
19 Apr 1913	Aberdare	A	0–0		

=== Welsh Cup ===
Newport County entered the Welsh Cup for the first time during the 1912–13 season. The club won its opening tie against Mardy before being eliminated by Aberdare following a replay in the next round.

Round	Date	Opponents	Venue	Result	Scorers	Attendance
P1	10 Oct 1912	Mardy	H	1–0	G.Fyfe	2,000
P2	2 Nov 1912	Aberdare	A	1–1	Holt	1,500
P2r	2 Nov 1912	Aberdare	A	0–4		

== League table ==
Pos	Team	Pld	W	D	L	F	A	GR	Pts	Notes
1	Cardiff City	24	18	5	1	54	15	3.600	41	Promoted to First Division
2	Southend United	24	14	6	4	43	23	1.869	34	Promoted to First Division
3	Swansea Town	24	12	7	5	29	23	1.260	31	
4	Croydon Common	24	13	4	7	51	29	1.758	30	
5	Luton Town	24	13	4	7	52	39	1.333	30	
6	Llanelly	24	9	6	9	33	39	0.846	24	
7	Pontypridd	24	6	11	7	30	28	1.071	23	
8	Mid-Rhondda	24	9	4	11	33	31	1.064	22	
9	Aberdare	24	8	6	10	38	40	0.950	22	
10	Newport County	24	7	5	12	29	36	0.805	19	
11	Mardy	24	6	3	15	38	38	1.000	15	
12	Treharris	24	5	2	17	18	60	0.300	12	
13	Ton Pentre	24	3	3	18	22	69	0.318	9	

== Season statistics ==
- League position: 10th (Southern League Second Division)
- League record: 24 matches; 7 wins, 5 draws, 12 defeats
- Goals scored: 29
- Goals conceded: 36
- Points: 19 (two points awarded for a win)
