= Bobby Ward =

Scottish footballer

Personal information
- Full name: Robert Ward
- Date of birth: 21 October 1958 (age 68)
- Place of birth: Glasgow, Scotland
- Position: Striker

Youth career
- Celtic

Senior career*
Years	Team	Apps	(Gls)
1979–1981	Newport County	3	(0)
- * Club domestic league appearances and goals

Robert "Bobby" Ward (born 21 October 1958) is a Scottish former footballer, who played for Celtic and Newport County.

Ward was considered a hot prospect at Celtic until a managerial change forced him to move to Newport County, where he played alongside legends such as John Aldridge and Tommy Tynan. Ward joined Newport County during the most successful period in the club's long history. Ward was part of the squad that won promotion and the Welsh Cup and in the subsequent season reached the quarter-final of the 1981 European Cup Winners Cup. They reached the quarter-finals, losing 3–2 on aggregate to Carl Zeiss Jena of East Germany.

In 1981, he joined Scottish club Rutherglen Glencairn
