= Steve Biggins =

English footballer (born 1954)

Personal information
- Full name: Steven James Biggins
- Date of birth: 20 June 1954 (age 72)
- Place of birth: Lichfield, Staffordshire, England
- Height: 6 ft 0 in (1.83 m)
- Position: Forward

Youth career
- Hednesford Town

Senior career*
Years	Team	Apps	(Gls)
1977–1982	Shrewsbury Town	146	(41)
1982–1984	Oxford United	59	(22)
1984–1986	Derby County	10	(1)
1985	→ Wolverhampton Wanderers (loan)	4	(0)
1986	→ Port Vale (loan)	4	(0)
1986	Trelleborg		
1986–1987	Exeter City	14	(2)
- Telford United
- Worcester City
- Ludlow Town
Total		247+	(66+)
- * Club domestic league appearances and goals

Steven James Biggins (born 20 June 1954) is an English former footballer. A forward, he scored 66 goals in 237 league games in a 15-year career in the Football League.

Starting at Hednesford Town, he signed to Shrewsbury Town for £6,000 in December 1977 and helped the "Shrews" to the Third Division title in 1978–79, and also featured in Welsh Cup finals in 1979 and 1980. Transferring to Oxford United for £8,000 in July 1982, he helped the club to the Third Division title in 1983–84 and the Second Division title in 1984–85. He moved on to Derby County in October 1984. He had brief loan spells with Wolverhampton Wanderers and Port Vale, as both Derby and Port Vale won promotion in 1985–86. He spent a brief period playing in Sweden for Trelleborg before returning to England to play for Exeter City and non-League sides Telford United and Worcester City.

== Career ==
Biggins was a pupil at the Shire Oak Grammar School (now Shire Oak Academy) in Walsall Wood, West Midlands. He began his career at non-League Hednesford Town before being signed by Third Division side Shrewsbury Town for £6,000 in December 1977. The Gay Meadow club went on to finish the 1977–78 campaign in 11th place. New manager Graham Turner then led the "Shrews" to the Welsh Cup and the Third Division title in 1978–79, they had though finished just two points ahead of fourth-placed Gillingham. They retained their Second Division status in 1979–80 with a comfortable mid-table finish. They also competed in the final of Welsh Cup, losing 5–1 to Newport County. Shrewsbury dropped to 14th in 1980–81, just three points above the relegation zone. They dropped to 18th in 1981–82, two places and two points above the drop.

He was sold to Third Division club Oxford United for £8,000 in July 1982. The "Yellows" finished fifth in 1982–83, two places and two points short of promotion. Biggins was their leading goalscorer with 24 goals in all competitions in 1983–84, as manager Jim Smith led Oxford to the Third Division title. However, Biggins soon moved on again, joining Derby County in October 1984; Oxford would finish top of the Second Division. Despite moving back down to the third tier, the striker was unable to hold down a place under Arthur Cox at the Baseball Ground. The "Rams" finished seventh in 1984–85, and Biggins also had a brief spell on loan at Wolverhampton Wanderers. Derby won promotion in third place in 1985–86, though he spent a four-game period on loan at Port Vale, who John Rudge led to promotion out of the Fourth Division that season.

He had a short spell with Trelleborg in Sweden before returning to England to sign with Exeter City in October 1986. He played 14 Fourth Division games for the "Grecians" in 1986–87, playing his last game in the Football League in January. He moved on to Telford United, scoring 20 goals for the Conference side in 1987–88. He later played for non-league side Worcester City and Ludlow Town. He later served as assistant manager of Ellesmere Rangers.

== Career statistics ==
Appearances and goals by club, season and competition
Club	Season	League			FA Cup		Other		Total	
Club	Season	Division	Apps	Goals	Apps	Goals	Apps	Goals	Apps	Goals
Shrewsbury Town	1977–78	Third Division	9	7	0	0	0	0	9	7
Shrewsbury Town	1978–79	Third Division	45	9	8	3	2	1	55	13
Shrewsbury Town	1979–80	Second Division	37	13	1	0	3	0	41	13
Shrewsbury Town	1980–81	Second Division	33	9	2	0	5	1	40	10
Shrewsbury Town	1981–82	Second Division	22	3	2	0	4	1	28	4
Shrewsbury Town	Total		146	41	13	3	14	3	173	47
Oxford United	1982–83	Third Division	10	1	0	0	4	1	14	1
Oxford United	1983–84	Third Division	42	19	5	2	11	3	58	24
Oxford United	1984–85	Second Division	7	2	0	0	2	0	9	2
Oxford United	Total		59	22	5	2	17	4	81	28
Derby County	1984–85	Third Division	10	1	1	0	1	0	12	1
Derby County	1985–86	Third Division	0	0	0	0	1	0	1	0
Derby County	Total		10	1	1	0	2	0	13	1
Wolverhampton Wanderers (loan)	1984–85	Second Division	4	0	0	0	0	0	4	0
Port Vale (loan)	1985–86	Fourth Division	4	0	0	0	0	0	4	0
Exeter City	1986–87	Fourth Division	14	2	1	0	2	0	17	2
Career total			237	66	20	5	35	7	292	78

== Honours ==
Shrewsbury Town

- Football League Third Division: 1978–79
- Welsh Cup: 1978–79; runner-up: 1979–80

Oxford United

- Football League Third Division: 1983–84
- Football League Second Division: 1984–85

Port Vale

- Football League Fourth Division fourth-place promotion: 1985–86
