= John Aldridge =

Association football player and manager

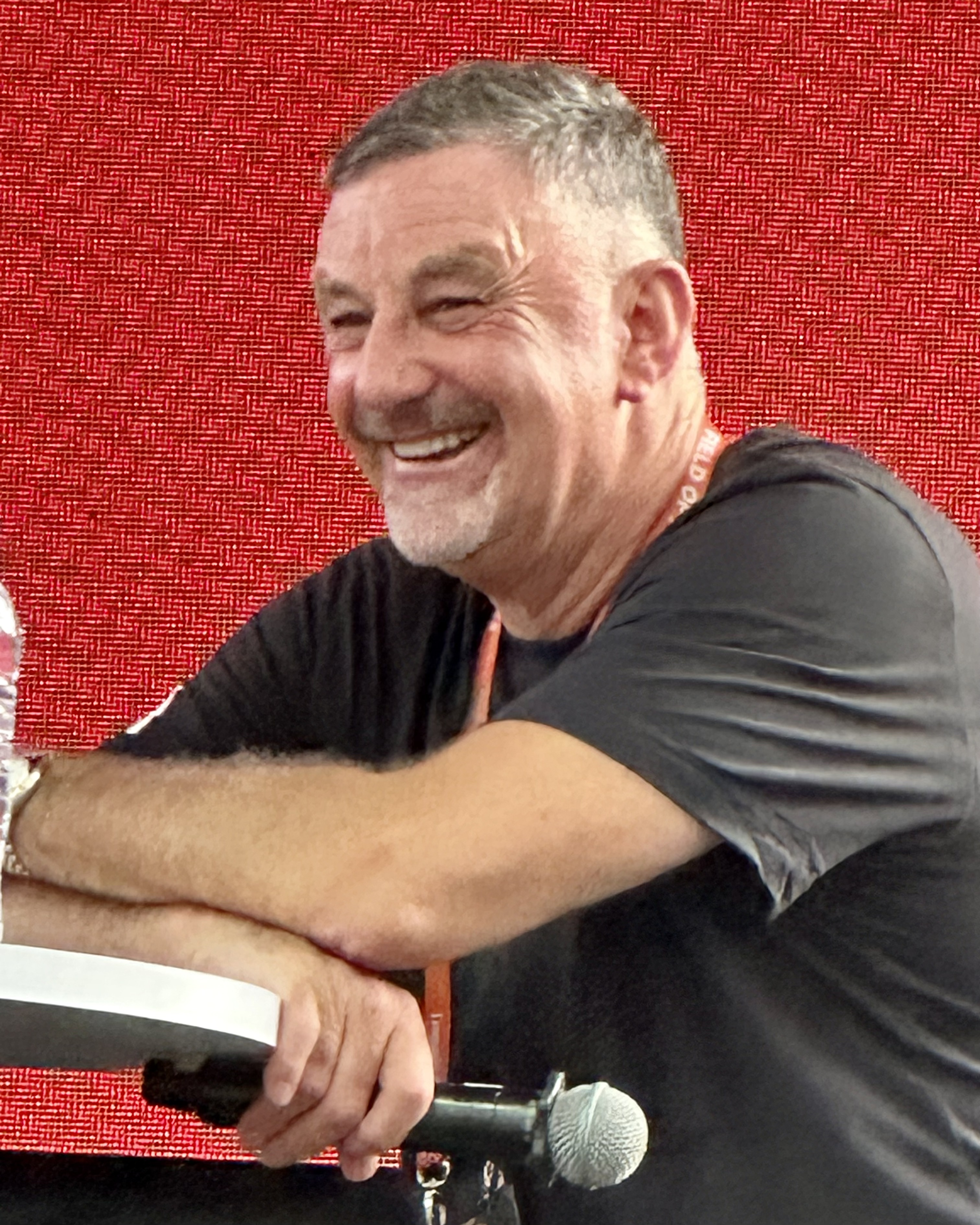
- Aldridge in 2023

Personal information
- Full name: John William Aldridge
- Date of birth: 18 September 1958 (age 68)
- Place of birth: Liverpool, England
- Height: 5 ft 11 in (1.80 m)
- Position: Striker

Youth career
- 1978–1979: South Liverpool

Senior career*
Years	Team	Apps	(Gls)
1979–1984	Newport County	170	(69)
1984–1987	Oxford United	114	(72)
1987–1989	Liverpool	83	(50)
1989–1991	Real Sociedad	63	(33)
1991–1998	Tranmere Rovers	243	(138)
Total		673	(362)

International career
1986–1996	Republic of Ireland	69	(19)

Managerial career
- 1996–2001: Tranmere Rovers
- * Club domestic league appearances and goals

John William Aldridge (born 18 September 1958) is a former footballer and manager. Nicknamed "Aldo", he was a prolific, record-breaking striker. His tally of 329 Football League goals is the sixth-highest in the history of English football.

During his early career, he worked his way up through the lower leagues, playing in every league from the old Fourth Division to the old First Division. Initially signed as a replacement for Ian Rush, Aldridge spent over two successful seasons at Liverpool, winning the league and FA Cup once, and narrowly missing out on a second league title. Aldridge spent two seasons at Real Sociedad, becoming the first non-Basque player to sign for the club in several decades as they abandoned their selective recruitment policy. In 1991, he returned to England to play for Tranmere Rovers, becoming their player-manager in 1996. He retired from playing in 1998 and resigned as manager in 2001 and has not managed since.

A Liverpudlian by birth, he was recruited to play for the Republic of Ireland as part of Jack Charlton's "Granny Rule" policy: his great-grandmother was from Athlone, and travelled to Liverpool to settle in the 19th century. His career with Ireland coincided with their most successful period in international football, and he played at two World Cups.

== Club career ==
=== South Liverpool and Newport County ===
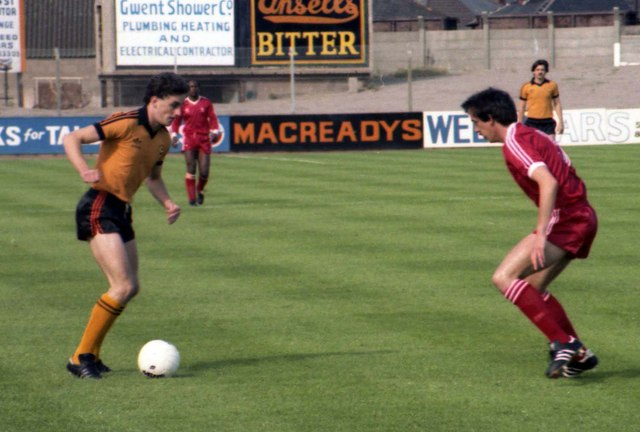
Aldridge (with the ball) playing for Newport County in 1981

Aldridge took a long time to reach the top level of the English game. He began his career in the mid-1970s at non-league South Liverpool, before getting his break in the professional game when, aged 20, he signed for Newport County in the Fourth Division on 2 May 1979 for £3,500.

While at Somerton Park, he played 198 times scoring 87 goals, a goal every 2 1/4 games, including seven goals in twelve FA Cup matches. He partnered Tommy Tynan and Dave Gwyther for four years at Somerton Park, helping Newport to promotion from the Fourth Division and Welsh Cup glory in his first season, and to reach the quarter-finals of the European Cup Winners' Cup in his second.

His first season with County, the 1979–80 season, saw him score fourteen goals from 38 games as his side won the Welsh Cup and gained promotion to the Third Division. A year later, he featured in the side that achieved a notable European run. In the league, he scored seven goals in 27 league games. He scored eleven goals in 36 games in the 1981–82 season, but in the 1982–83 season, he did better still with seventeen goals from 41 games as County narrowly missed out on promotion to the second tier.

In the 1983–84 season, with Tynan having departed, Aldridge had scored 26 times by the end of February, and County were still in the Third Division.

=== Oxford United ===
Aldridge was sold to Oxford United on 21 March 1984, when the club was preparing for their Third Division promotion run-in under the management of Jim Smith. He made his debut on 7 April 1984, coming on as a substitute in a 1–0 win over Walsall at Fellows Park. His first goal was in the 5–0 home win against Bolton Wanderers on 20 April 1984.

He was used sparingly in the run-in to the Third Division title but the following season forged a partnership with Billy Hamilton and became the first Second Division player for nineteen years to score 30 goals. His 34 goals (30 in the league) in 1984–85 broke the club's goalscoring record for a single season, as Oxford gained promotion to the old First Division for the first time. Aldridge also picked up a Second Division title medal.

In his 27th year, Aldridge finally had the chance to play in the First Division. He was the third-highest scorer in the division (only surpassed by Gary Lineker and Frank McAvennie) and netted six goals in United's League Cup-winning run in 1986 which culminated in a 3–0 victory over Queens Park Rangers in the final at Wembley. This is Oxford's only major trophy to date. His 23 goals from 39 games also assisted in Oxford avoiding relegation.

Aldridge ended up playing 141 times for Oxford, scoring 90 goals – a goal every 1.5 games – including fourteen League Cup goals in 17 ties. He scored four goals against Gillingham in the League Cup on 24 September 1986 and three hat-tricks, the first in the 5–2 victory over Leeds United on 24 November 1984. He also scored one of the two Oxford goals that defeated Manchester United in Alex Ferguson's first game as manager, on 8 November 1986, maintaining his fine form into the 1986–87 season.

=== Liverpool ===
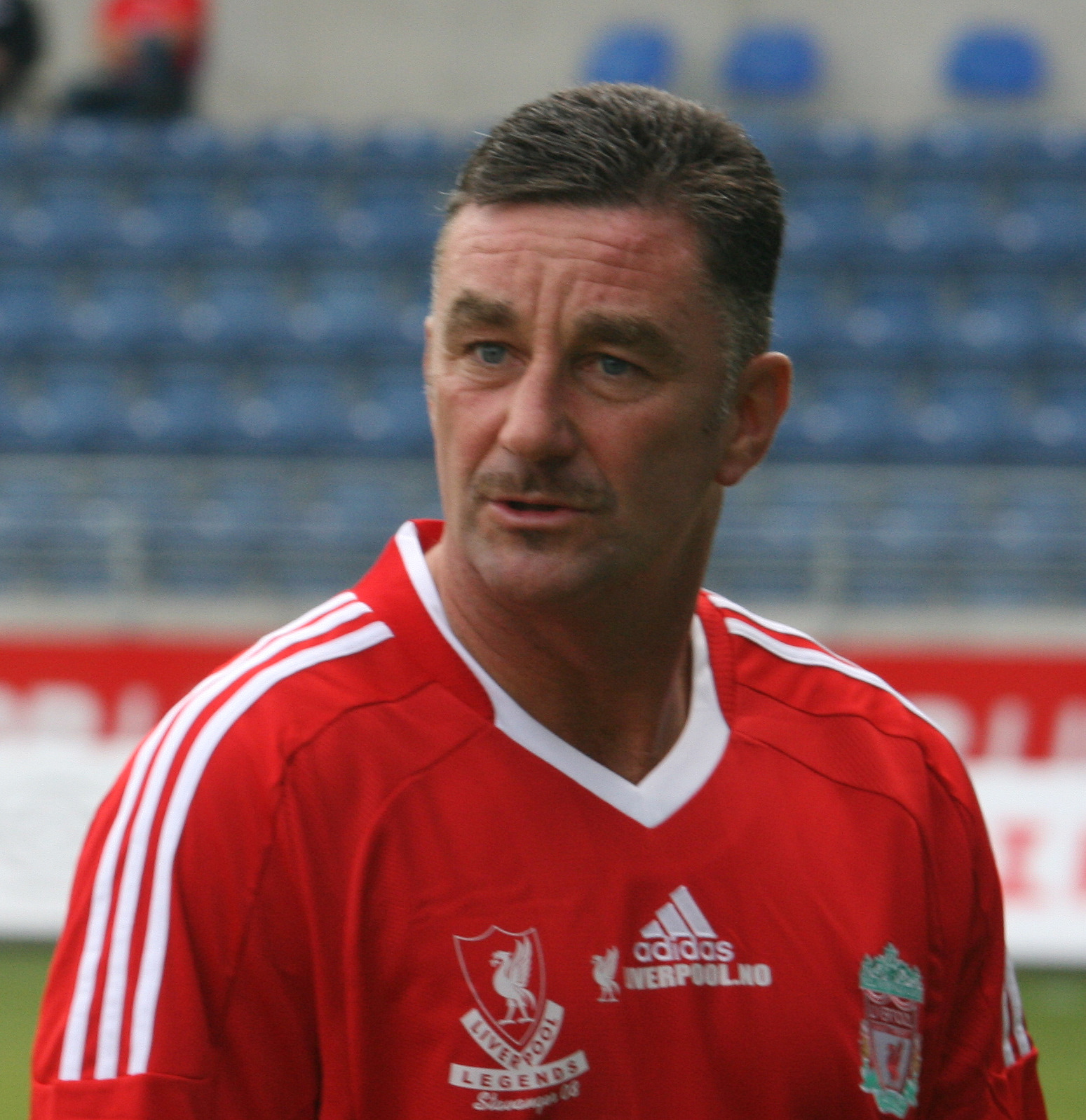
Aldridge representing Liverpool in 2008

In early 1987, Liverpool were losing striker Ian Rush to Juventus at the end of the 1986–87 season and needed a proven and experienced replacement. He signed for Kenny Dalglish's side on 27 January 1987 for £750,000 and was initially used as a partner for Rush (filling a position previously occupied by player-manager Dalglish and fellow striker Paul Walsh) and as an occasional substitute. Dalglish had been interested in signing other strikers, including Chelsea's David Speedie and Arsenal's Charlie Nicholas, for a number of months before settling on Aldridge. By the time of his transfer to Liverpool in that 1986–87 season, Aldridge had already scored fifteen goals for Oxford in 25 games.

Liverpool ended the season trophyless, including a Wembley defeat to Arsenal in the League Cup final, for which Aldridge was ineligible.

Aldridge made his debut for Liverpool on 21 February 1987, when he came on as a 46th-minute substitute for Craig Johnston in a 2–2 league draw with Aston Villa at Villa Park. His first goal for his new club came a week later on 28 February, in the 60th minute, the only goal of the game as Liverpool beat Southampton in a league match at Anfield.

Aldridge scored 26 goals in a successful season for Liverpool, including a strike in each of the first nine games, forming a 10-match scoring run as he had scored in his final league appearance of the previous season.

He linked up with new signings Peter Beardsley and John Barnes as Liverpool lost only twice in the league season and went unbeaten for the first 29 matches. Liverpool won the 1988 league title with a nine-point lead over their nearest rivals Manchester United, although the gap between Liverpool and their nearest contenders was considerably wider for much of the season.

Aldridge scored both goals in the club's FA Cup semi-final against Nottingham Forest. With Wimbledon 1–0 up in the FA Cup final at Wembley, midway through the second half, Liverpool were awarded a spot-kick when Aldridge himself was fouled, and he took the resulting penalty. Aldridge had scored all eleven of his penalty kicks that season, but goalkeeper Dave Beasant noticed that he always placed the ball to the keeper's left. Aldridge did, as predicted, place the penalty to Beasant's left, and the keeper sprang across to save it. He became the first goalkeeper to save a penalty in a Wembley FA Cup final. Aldridge's failure was his first penalty miss for Liverpool. He was substituted shortly afterwards as Liverpool lost 1–0.

The following season was tough and eventful for Aldridge. Rush failed to settle in Italy and Liverpool paid £2.8 million to bring him back to Anfield just before the season started. Dalglish played Aldridge and Rush together. In the Charity Shield match against Wimbledon at Wembley, Aldridge started the match and scored both Liverpool goals in a 2–1 win. Aldridge maintained his scoring streak, often playing alongside both Rush and Beardsley in attack, while Rush missed a number of games or started games on the bench due to injuries. In the first league game of the season a week later, Aldridge scored a hat-trick in a 3–0 win at Charlton Athletic. He scored another league hat-trick on 14 March, in the 5–0 home win over Luton Town, which took his league tally for the season to fifteen goals. He reached the twenty-goal mark on 13 May in a 2–1 win at Wimbledon, and finished the season as the club's top scorer with 22 goals in the league, eight in the FA Cup, two in the League Cup, and two in the Charity Shield, amounting to 34 in all competitions.

In the 1989 FA Cup final at Wembley, against Merseyside rivals Everton, Aldridge scored after four minutes with his first touch of the ball. Rush, who replaced Aldridge as a substitute, scored twice in extra time to earn Liverpool a 3–2 victory. Aldridge scored 21 league goals, and 31 in all competitions, putting him among the highest scorers in the first division that season. The League and FA Cup double, achieved by Liverpool in 1986, was again possible, with a deciding game against Arsenal to come at Anfield. Aldridge played in a game which would guarantee Liverpool the title as long as Arsenal failed to win by two clear goals. 1–0 down in injury time, Liverpool conceded another goal to Michael Thomas with virtually the last kick of the season, thus losing the League title.

Aldridge played 104 times for Liverpool, scoring 63 goals, 50 of them in the league.

=== Real Sociedad ===
The following 1989–90 season, Kenny Dalglish reverted to a 4–4–2 formation with Rush and Beardsley as first-choice strikers. Liverpool accepted an offer of £1 million from La Liga side Real Sociedad in early September 1989, with Aldridge having played twice in the league for Liverpool that season.

This transfer made Aldridge the first non-Basque player to sign for Sociedad in several decades as they changed their selective recruitment policy.

Aldridge scored 40 goals in 75 appearances for Sociedad over two seasons, with the club encouraged to make more signings from English football in 1990, namely Dalian Atkinson and Kevin Richardson. Despite his success, some Sociedad fans initially did not accept him because he was a non-Basque. Insulting graffiti was written on the stadium, a fan spat on the ground when Aldridge passed in the street, and his family found it hard to adapt to the different lifestyle in the Basque country. Aldridge handed in a transfer request in 1991 to the newly appointed manager John Toshack – another former Liverpool striker.

=== Tranmere Rovers ===
Aldridge returned to Merseyside on 11 July 1991 with Tranmere Rovers, in a £250,000 deal. While there he scored a club-record 40 goals in his first season at Prenton Park – scoring his 40th goal against former club Oxford United. Tranmere, who were playing in the Second Division for the first time in more than fifty years, achieved a mid-table finish in the league.

He made his debut for Rovers, aged 32, on 17 August 1991, scoring both the goals in a 2–0 victory over Brighton & Hove Albion at the Goldstone Ground. In seven years as a Tranmere player, he amassed a total of 294 appearances, scoring 174 goals, an average of one goal every 1.7 games, including 22 goals from 25 League Cup ties. Aldridge retired at the end of the 1997–98 season, scoring a brace in his final game as a professional against Wolverhampton Wanderers.

Aldridge's goals helped Tranmere reach their highest position ever in the league – top-six finishes in the second tier in 1993, 1994 and 1995 – which delivered playoff places each time, but all of them ended in semi-final defeats. He also came close to winning another major trophy as Rovers took Aston Villa to a penalty shoot-out in the 1993–94 League Cup semi-finals before bowing out to the eventual competition winners.

During his career in England alone, Aldridge played 739 games, scoring 411 times – an average of one goal every 1.8 games.

On 12 March 1996, with the resignation of John King after nine years as manager, Aldridge became player-manager of Tranmere, before finally giving up playing and concentrating on the management side two years later. In his first season in charge, Rovers finished the 1995–96 season in thirteenth place in Division One.

Under Aldridge, Tranmere reached the 2000 Football League Cup final (which they lost to Leicester City) and consecutive FA Cup quarter-finals in 2000 and 2001. During the 2000 League Cup final, Aldridge slapped the face of Leicester's Theo Zagorakis after he applauded the referee's decision to send off Clint Hill. The slap was seen by FA officials and he was charged with misconduct. Aldridge said of incident: "I felt he [Zagorakis] had disrespected Clint on one of the biggest occasions of his career so I slapped him". Tranmere were relegated into English football's third tier in 2001. Aldridge resigned in March 2001, just before Rovers' fate was sealed.

== International career ==
Aldridge had already been recruited to play for the Republic of Ireland by the time he was approached by Liverpool at the start of 1987, qualifying through his grandmother, who was from Athlone. (When the Football Association of Ireland came looking for him they found out that Ray Houghton, who also played for Oxford at the time, was also eligible.) He made his debut, aged 27 on 26 March 1986 against Wales at Lansdowne Road in a 1–0 defeat. The match was the first under new manager Jack Charlton.

That summer, Aldridge played for the Irish side which had qualified, under Charlton, for Euro 88 in West Germany, their first-ever major finals. They duly beat England 1–0, and drew 1–1 with the Soviet Union, but went out of the competition after a defeat by eventual champions the Netherlands. Aldridge was struggling at international level at this time – he was playing well as a team performer, and Charlton was never unhappy, but it took him 20 matches to score his first international goal, which came against Tunisia at Lansdowne Road on 19 October 1988.

Aldridge withdrew himself from Ireland's World Cup qualifying tie with Spain at Lansdowne Road on 26 April 1989, as he felt unable to participate in the game due to his grief over the Hillsborough disaster. The game ended in a 1–0 win for Ireland. Aldridge finally scored his first goals at competitive level when he scored twice in a 2–0 win away over Malta on 15 November 1989, which sealed Ireland's qualification for the 1990 FIFA World Cup.

Aldridge played a crucial role in Ireland's path to the quarter-finals of the 1990 FIFA World Cup in Italy. Though he had finally opened his goal account for his country, he failed to score at the World Cup (although he had a goal disallowed in a 1–1 draw with the Netherlands) and Ireland lost to the host nation in the last eight. Aldridge played every game but was substituted in all of his five appearances.

Ireland failed to qualify for Euro 92, despite going through their group unbeaten. Aldridge scored three times in qualification, all three goals coming in Ireland's opening 5–0 win over Turkey at Lansdowne Road. Despite this setback, Aldridge helped Ireland to qualify for the 1994 FIFA World Cup: he scored six times in qualifying including a hat-trick in a 4–0 win over Latvia.

Aldridge's international career with Ireland is also remembered for an off-pitch incident at the 1994 FIFA World Cup. Trailing 2–0 to Mexico in a group game in Orlando, Florida, Charlton tried to send Aldridge on as a substitute but was delayed by a perceived sluggishness from the officials. Manager and player both launched expletive-laden tirades which were clearly heard by television viewers, with Aldridge having to be restrained from attacking the fourth official and a FIFA representative. When Aldridge finally was allowed on, after six full minutes of trying, he scored a goal to give Ireland a chance to get back into the game. After the game Aldridge was fined $2,500 by FIFA for unsporting behaviour. Despite losing the game 2–1, Aldridge's goal was crucial in securing qualification for the second round. All four teams in the group had finished with the same number of points and the same goal difference; Ireland's qualification was at the expense of Norway, who had scored just one goal fewer. Without Aldridge's goal against Mexico, Ireland would have finished fourth in their group, and been eliminated.

Aldridge continued to play for Ireland in the qualifying stages of Euro 96. Despite a strong start to the group, Ireland failed to qualify. Aldridge scored twice in a 3–0 win away to Latvia in Ireland's opening game and was also on the scoresheet in a 4–0 away win against Northern Ireland. In Ireland's final home game of the group, Aldridge scored twice against Latvia in a 2–1 win, but Ireland failed to qualify after finishing second and losing a subsequent playoff to the Netherlands at Anfield in December 1995. Aldridge at this time was one goal short of the 20-goal record held by Frank Stapleton, but despite playing in the early stages of qualifying for the 1998 FIFA World Cup, he failed to score again to match the record and retired in 1996 to concentrate on managing Tranmere Rovers. His final game was a 3–0 win against Macedonia on 9 October 1996, when he came on as a substitute.

Overall, Aldridge scored nineteen goals in sixty-nine matches spanning over a decade; eight of his nineteen goals came against Latvia.

== Career after football ==
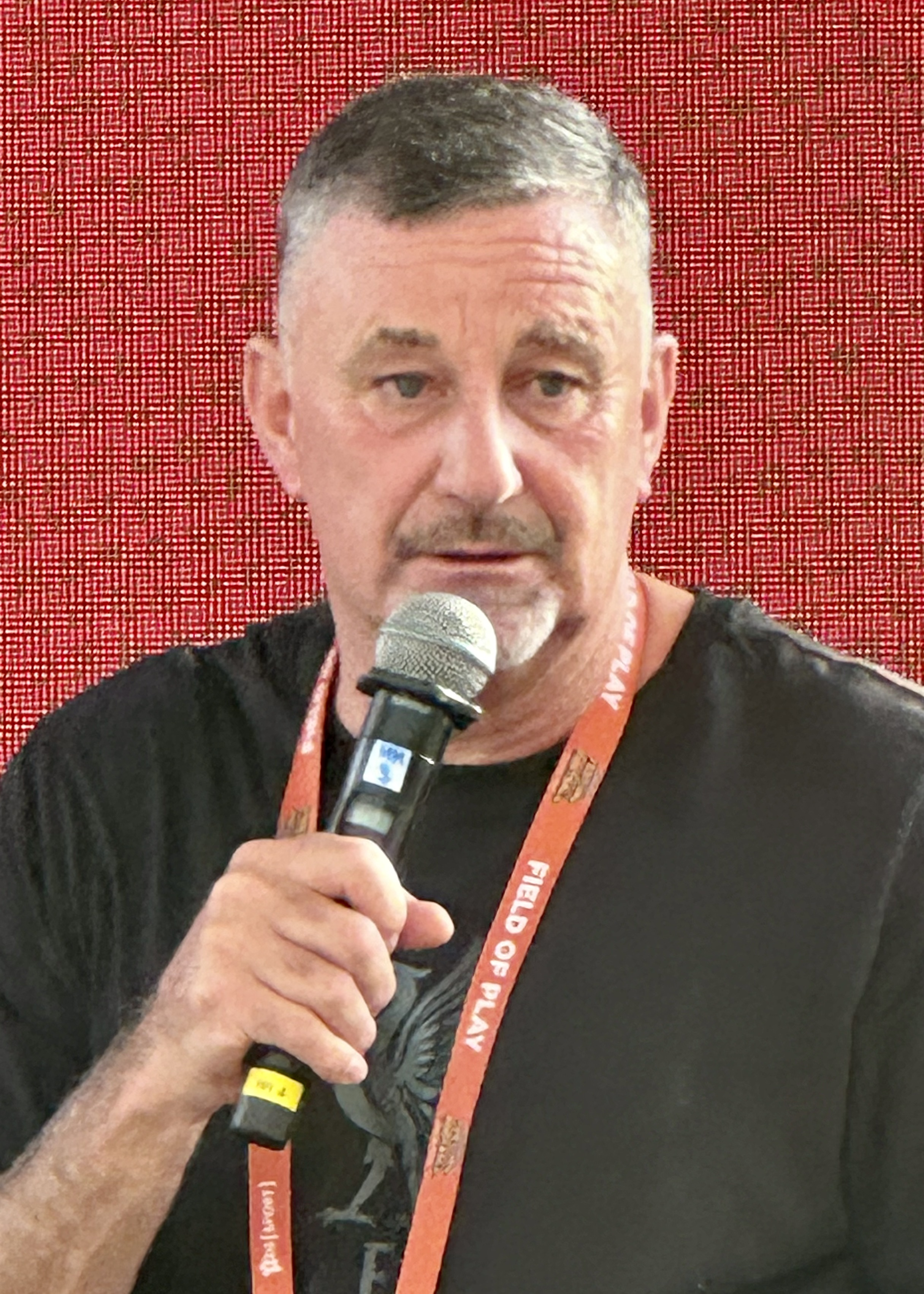
Aldridge representing Liverpool in Singapore, 2023

Aldridge is now a pundit with various media organisations – most notably with Radio City 96.7 where he summarises on the station's Liverpool commentaries home and away. He also continues to play in the Liverpool veterans' team. In 1998, he asked Hyder Jawad to ghost-write his autobiography. John Aldridge: My Story was published by Hodder & Stoughton the year after.

In 2006, he gained media celebrity in Ireland by appearing in RTÉ's Charity You're A Star competition. Despite not having a natural singing voice, Aldridge won the competition and in the process raised money for his nominated charity Temple Street Children's Hospital.

Aldridge was a crowd favourite everywhere he went, especially on Merseyside where being a local lad helped his cause. This was confirmed when a poll conducted by the official Liverpool F.C. website during the summer of 2006 placed him in 26th position. 110,000 Liverpool supporters worldwide took part in the poll named 100 Players Who Shook The Kop, where they were asked to name their favourite Reds of all time.

In March 2008, Aldridge took part in the autobiography audio CD series 60 minutes with John Aldridge. He spoke in depth about his career with 60 minutes presenter David Knight and later took part in a major signing session, signing 2000 copies of the CD in support of the Everyman appeal charity.

Aldridge was allegedly involved in the News of the World hacking scandal in the mid-2000s. "They tell me I was hacked five or six years ago. I have no idea why they should go after me. I'm not exactly high profile."

== Career statistics ==
=== Club ===
Appearances and goals by club, season and competition
Club	Season	League			National cup		League Cup		Continental		Other (Note: Appearances in FA Charity Shield, Welsh Cup, Full Members' Cup, Football League Trophy)		Total	
Club	Season	Division	Apps	Goals	Apps	Goals	Apps	Goals	Apps	Goals	Apps	Goals	Apps	Goals
Newport County	1979–80	Fourth Division	38	14	1	0	0	0			5	2	44	16
Newport County	1980–81	Third Division	27	7	1	0	4	2	4	2	2	1	38	12
Newport County	1981–82	Third Division	36	11	1	0	2	1			–		39	12
Newport County	1982–83	Third Division	41	17	5	2	3	1			6	1	55	21
Newport County	1983–84	Third Division	28	20	5	3	2	1			2	3	37	27
Newport County	Total		170	69	13	5	11	5	4	2	15	7	213	88
Oxford United	1983–84	Third Division	8	4							–		8	4
Oxford United	1984–85	Second Division	42	30	2	1	6	3			–		50	34
Oxford United	1985–86	First Division	39	23	2	1	8	5			5	2	54	31
Oxford United	1986–87	First Division	25	15	1	0	4	6					30	21
Oxford United	Total		114	72	5	2	18	14	0	0	5	2	142	90
Liverpool	1986–87	First Division	10	2									10	2
Liverpool	1987–88	First Division	36	26	6	2	3	1					45	29
Liverpool	1988–89	First Division	35	21	6	6	5	2			1	2	47	31
Liverpool	1989–90	First Division	2	1							0	0	2	1
Liverpool	Total		83	50	12	8	8	3	0	0	1	2	104	63
Real Sociedad	1989–90	La Liga	28	16	6	6	–						34	22
Real Sociedad	1990–91	La Liga	35	17	2	0	–		4	1			41	18
Real Sociedad	Total		63	33	8	6			4	1			75	40
Tranmere Rovers	1991–92	Second Division	43	22	3	2	5	8			–		49	30
Tranmere Rovers	1992–93	First Division	31	21	2	1	2	2			–		31	21
Tranmere Rovers	1993–94	First Division	34	21	1	0	7	7			–		34	21
Tranmere Rovers	1994–95	First Division	33	24	1	0	4	1			–		33	24
Tranmere Rovers	1995–96	First Division	45	27	1	0	3	2			–		45	27
Tranmere Rovers	1996–97	First Division	43	18	1	0	4	2			–		48	20
Tranmere Rovers	1997–98	First Division	14	5	0	0	0	0			–		14	5
Tranmere Rovers	Total		243	138	9	3	25	22	0	0	0	0	275	161
Career total			673	362	47	24	62	44	8	3	21	11	811	444

=== International ===
Republic of Ireland	Year	Friendlies		Competitive		Total	
Republic of Ireland	Year	App	Goals	App	Goals	App	Goals
Republic of Ireland	1986	3	0	4	0	7	0
Republic of Ireland	1987	1	0	5	0	6	0
Republic of Ireland	1988	3	1	5	0	8	1
Republic of Ireland	1989	2	0	5	2	7	2
Republic of Ireland	1990	2	0	7	3	9	3
Republic of Ireland	1991	1	0	3	0	4	0
Republic of Ireland	1992	3	1	6	4	9	5
Republic of Ireland	1993	0	0	6	2	6	2
Republic of Ireland	1994	1	0	5	4	6	4
Republic of Ireland	1995	0	0	5	2	5	2
Republic of Ireland	1996	1	0	1	0	2	0
Total		17	2	52	17	69	19

Scores and results list Republic of Ireland's goal tally first, score column indicates score after each Aldridge goal.

List of international goals scored by John Aldridge
No.	Date	Venue	Opponent	Score	Result	Competition
1	19 October 1988	Lansdowne Road, Dublin, Ireland	Tunisia	3–0	4–0	Friendly
2	15 November 1989	Ta' Qali National Stadium, Attard, Malta	Malta	1–0	2–0	1990 FIFA World Cup qualification
3	15 November 1989	Ta' Qali National Stadium, Attard, Malta	Malta	2–0	2–0	1990 FIFA World Cup qualification
4	17 October 1990	Lansdowne Road, Dublin, Ireland	Turkey	1–0	5–0	UEFA Euro 1992 qualifying
5	17 October 1990	Lansdowne Road, Dublin, Ireland	Turkey	3–0	5–0	UEFA Euro 1992 qualifying
6	17 October 1990	Lansdowne Road, Dublin, Ireland	Turkey	5–0	5–0	UEFA Euro 1992 qualifying
7	25 March 1992	Lansdowne Road, Dublin, Ireland	Switzerland	2–1	2–1	Friendly
8	26 May 1992	Lansdowne Road, Dublin, Ireland	Albania	1–0	2–0	1994 FIFA World Cup qualification
9	9 September 1992	Lansdowne Road, Dublin, Ireland	Latvia	2–0	4–0	1994 FIFA World Cup qualification
10	9 September 1992	Lansdowne Road, Dublin, Ireland	Latvia	3–0	4–0	1994 FIFA World Cup qualification
11	9 September 1992	Lansdowne Road, Dublin, Ireland	Latvia	4–0	4–0	1994 FIFA World Cup qualification
12	9 June 1993	Daugava Stadium, Riga, Latvia	Latvia	1–0	2–0	1994 FIFA World Cup qualification
13	8 September 1993	Lansdowne Road, Dublin, Ireland	Lithuania	1–0	2–0	1994 FIFA World Cup qualification
14	24 June 1994	Citrus Bowl, Orlando, United States	Mexico	1–2	1–2	1994 FIFA World Cup
15	7 September 1994	Daugava Stadium, Riga, Latvia	Latvia	1–0	3–0	UEFA Euro 1996 qualifying
16	7 September 1994	Daugava Stadium, Riga, Latvia	Latvia	3–0	3–0	UEFA Euro 1996 qualifying
17	16 November 1994	Windsor Park, Belfast, Northern Ireland	Northern Ireland	1–0	4–0	UEFA Euro 1996 qualifying
18	11 October 1995	Lansdowne Road, Dublin, Ireland	Latvia	1–0	2–0	UEFA Euro 1996 qualifying
19	11 October 1995	Lansdowne Road, Dublin, Ireland	Latvia	2–0	2–0	UEFA Euro 1996 qualifying

== Honours ==
=== Player ===
Newport County

- Welsh Cup: 1979–80

Oxford United

- Football League Second Division: 1984–85
- Football League Third Division: 1983–84
- Football League Cup: 1985–86

Liverpool

- Football League First Division: 1987–88
- FA Cup: 1988–89; runner-up: 1987–88
- FA Charity Shield: 1988, 1989

Individual

- Football League Second Division top scorer: 1984–85
- Football League First Division top scorer: 1987–88, 1994–95, 1995–96
- BBC Goal of the Season: 1987–88, 1988–89
- PFA Team of the Year: 1991–92 Second Division, 1992–93 First Division, 1994–95 First Division
- FAI Senior International Player of the Year: 1992

=== Manager ===
Tranmere Rovers

- Football League Cup runner-up: 1999–2000

== See also ==
- List of Republic of Ireland international footballers born outside the Republic of Ireland
- List of footballers in England by number of league goals
- List of men's footballers with 500 or more goals
