= 1981–82 Newport County A.F.C. season =

Welsh association football club season

Newport County
1981–82 season
- Chairman: Richard Ford
- Manager: Len Ashurst
- Stadium: Somerton Park
- Third Division: 16th
- FA Cup: 1st round
- League Cup: 2nd round
- Welsh Cup: 4th round
- Top goalscorer: League: Tynan (13); All: Tynan (16)
- Highest home attendance: 5,927 vs Bristol City (30 January 1982)
- Lowest home attendance: 2,948 vs Reading (2 January 1982)
- Average home league attendance: 4,476
Home colours	Away colours

The 1981–82 season was Newport County's second consecutive season in the Third Division and their 54th season overall in the Football League.

== Season review ==
=== Results summary ===
Note: Three points for a win

Overall								Home						Away					
Pld	W	D	L	GF	GA	GD	Pts	W	D	L	GF	GA	GD	W	D	L	GF	GA	GD
46	14	16	16	54	54	0	58	9	10	4	28	21	+7	5	6	12	26	33	−7

Last updated: 18 May 1982.

=== Results by round ===
Round	1	2	3	4	5	6	7	8	9	10	11	12	13	14	15	16	17	18	19	20	21	22	23	24	25	26	27	28	29	30	31	32	33	34	35	36	37	38	39	40	41	42	43	44	45	46
Ground	H	A	H	A	A	H	H	A	H	A	H	A	H	A	A	H	H	A	H	A	H	A	A	H	A	H	A	A	H	A	H	H	A	H	A	A	A	H	H	A	H	A	A	H	H	H
Result	W	W	W	L	L	D	L	D	W	L	D	D	W	L	L	L	D	W	L	D	W	L	L	D	D	D	L	W	L	L	D	D	D	D	L	W	W	W	D	L	D	L	D	W	W	W
Position	5	1	1	2	7	6	11	12	6	12	13	14	11	14	16	18	18	16	16	14	13	15	17	17	17	19	20	16	20	20	21	21	21	21	21	19	20	18	19	20	20	21	21	19	18	16

Updated to match(es) played on 18 May 1982. Source: statto.com
A = Away; H = Home; W = Win; D = Draw; L = Loss

== Fixtures and results ==
=== Third Division ===
Date	Opponents	Venue	Result	Scorers	Attendance
29 Aug 1981	Chesterfield	H	1–0	Johnson	5,079
4 Sep 1981	Southend United	A	4–0	Aldridge, Gwyther, Tynan, Elsey	4,620
12 Sep 1981	Oxford United	H	3–2	Waddle 2, Aldridge	5,293
19 Sep 1981	Bristol City	A	1–2	Aldridge	7,522
23 Sep 1981	Reading	A	1–2	Aldridge	4,542
26 Sep 1981	Preston North End	H	1–1	OG	5,064
29 Sep 1981	Brentford	H	0–1		4,028
3 Oct 1981	Lincoln City	A	2–2	Tynan 2	3,351
10 Oct 1981	Doncaster Rovers	H	1–0	Gwyther	4,579
17 Oct 1981	Fulham	A	1–3	Tynan	3,988
20 Oct 1981	Millwall	H	1–1	Goddard	4,609
24 Oct 1981	Portsmouth	A	0–0		8,787
31 Oct 1981	Carlisle United	H	2–0	Elsey 2	3,972
3 Nov 1981	Bristol Rovers	A	0–2		6,464
7 Nov 1981	Walsall	A	1–3	Oakes	4,169
14 Nov 1981	Plymouth Argyle	H	0–1		4,428
28 Nov 1981	Exeter City	H	1–1	Waddle	4,149
5 Dec 1981	Wimbledon	A	3–2	Tynan, Elsey, Waddle	2,056
26 Dec 1981	Chester	H	0–1		4,901
28 Dec 1981	Gillingham	A	1–1	Moore	6,055
2 Jan 1982	Reading	H	3–1	Aldridge 2, Lowndes	2,948
16 Jan 1982	Burnley	A	1–2	Moore	4,716
23 Jan 1982	Chesterfield	A	0–1		4,236
30 Jan 1982	Bristol City	H	1–1	Vaughan	5,927
6 Feb 1982	Oxford United	A	1–1	Tynan	5,653
13 Feb 1982	Lincoln City	H	0–0		3,735
20 Feb 1982	Brentford	A	0–2		4,297
27 Feb 1982	Doncaster Rovers	A	2–0	BIshop, Aldridge	4,190
7 Mar 1982	Fulham	H	1–3	Lowndes	5,178
9 Mar 1982	Millwall	A	0–1		3,084
13 Mar 1982	Portsmouth	H	1–1	Elsey	4,209
16 Mar 1982	Bristol Rovers	H	1–1	Tynan	5,312
20 Mar 1982	Carlisle United	A	2–2	Aldridge, Tynan	4,042
27 Mar 1982	Walsall	H	2–2	OG, Tynan	3,484
30 Mar 1982	Huddersfield Town	A	0–2		4,205
2 Apr 1982	Plymouth Argyle	A	2–1	Elsey, Bishop	5,148
10 Apr 1982	Chester	A	2–0	Aldridge 2	1,451
12 Apr 1982	Gillingham	H	4–2	Tynan, Vaughan, Johnson, Gwyther	4,353
17 Apr 1982	Wimbledon	H	0–0		3,900
24 Apr 1982	Exeter City	A	0–1		3,168
1 May 1982	Burnley	H	0–0		4,024
4 May 1982	Preston North End	A	1–2	Vaughan	4,972
8 May 1982	Swindon Town	A	1–1	Aldridge	5,676
11 May 1982	Southend United	H	3–2	Tynan 2, Elsey	3,716
15 May 1982	Huddersfield Town	H	1–0	Lowndes	4,169
18 May 1982	Swindon Town	H	1–0	Tynan	5,906

=== FA Cup ===
Round	Date	Opponents	Venue	Result	Scorers	Attendance
1	21 Nov 1981	Colchester United	A	0–2		3,535

=== Football League Cup ===
Round	Date	Opponents	Venue	Result	Scorers	Attendance	Notes
1–1	2 Sep 1981	Torquay United	A	3–2	Oakes, Moore, Aldridge	2,514	
1–2	15 Sep 1981	Torquay United	H	0–0		4,203	3–2 agg
2–1	6 Oct 1981	Oldham Athletic	A	0–1		5,507	
2–2	27 Oct 1981	Oldham Athletic	H	0–0		4,578	0–1 agg

=== Welsh Cup ===
Round	Date	Opponents	Venue	Result	Scorers	Attendance
3	1 Dec 1981	Taff's Well	H	5–0	Tynan 2, Oakes, Gwyther, Bishop	1,369
4	15 Dec 1981	Cardiff City	A	1–3	Oakes	3,916

=== League table ===
Pos	Team	Pld	W	D	L	GF	GA	GD	Pts
14	Preston North End	46	16	13	17	50	56	−6	61
15	Bristol Rovers	46	18	9	19	58	65	−7	61 (Note: Bristol Rovers had 2 points deducted.)
16	Newport County	46	14	16	16	54	54	0	58
17	Huddersfield Town	46	15	12	19	64	59	+5	57
18	Exeter City	46	16	9	21	71	84	−13	57

Source: rsssf.com (incorrect), source=11v11.com
