= 1980–81 Newport County A.F.C. season =

Welsh association football club season

Newport County
1980–81 season
- Chairman: Richard Ford
- Manager: Len Ashurst
- Stadium: Somerton Park
- Third Division: 12th
- European Cup Winners' Cup: Quarter-final
- FA Cup: 1st round
- League Cup: 2nd round
- Welsh Cup: Semi-final
- Top goalscorer: League: Gwyther (16); All: Gwyther (21)
- Highest home attendance: 18,000 vs FC Carl Zeiss Jena (ECWC, 18 Mar 1981)
- Lowest home attendance: 3,748 vs Carlisle United (5 May 1981)
- Average home league attendance: 5,658
Home colours	Away colours

The 1980–81 season was Newport County's first season back in the Third Division since relegation in 1962 and their 53rd season overall in the Football League.

The club finished a credible 12th in the Third Division but this season was all about County's first European competition, the UEFA Cup Winners' Cup.

== Season review ==
=== Results summary ===
Overall								Home						Away					
Pld	W	D	L	GF	GA	GD	Pts	W	D	L	GF	GA	GD	W	D	L	GF	GA	GD
46	15	13	18	64	61	+3	43	11	6	6	38	22	+16	4	7	12	26	39	−13

Source: rsssf.com

=== Results by round ===
Round	1	2	3	4	5	6	7	8	9	10	11	12	13	14	15	16	17	18	19	20	21	22	23	24	25	26	27	28	29	30	31	32	33	34	35	36	37	38	39	40	41	42	43	44	45	46
Ground	A	H	H	A	A	H	A	H	A	H	H	A	A	H	H	A	H	A	H	A	A	H	H	A	H	A	H	A	H	A	A	H	A	A	H	H	A	A	H	H	H	A	H	A	H	A
Result	D	L	W	W	L	L	L	L	W	D	W	L	L	W	W	W	W	L	L	L	D	D	D	L	L	D	W	L	L	D	W	D	D	L	W	D	D	L	W	D	W	D	W	L	W	L
Position	13	17	10	7	11	15	21	24	22	20	19	19	20	21	18	14	14	15	18	18	16	16	16	16	17	17	15	17	17	19	17	17	17	18	15	14	16	21	20	18	20	18	15	16	12	12

Updated to match(es) played on 7 May 1981. Source: statto.com
A = Away; H = Home; W = Win; D = Draw; L = Loss

== Fixtures and results ==
=== Third Division ===
Date	Opponents	Venue	Result	Scorers	Attendance
16 Aug 1980	Burnley	A	1–1	J.Aldridge	6,715
19 Aug 1980	Charlton Athletic	H	1–2	T.Tynan	8,062
23 Aug 1980	Millwall	H	2–1	T.Tynan 2	6,620
30 Aug 1980	Carlisle United	A	4–1	J.Aldridge, K.Elsey, D.Gwyther, K.Moore	2,859
6 Sep 1980	Gillingham	A	2–3	S.Lowndes, K.Oakes	4,712
13 Sep 1980	Oxford United	H	0–1		5,256
20 Sep 1980	Chesterfield	A	2–3	D.Gwyther, T.Tynan	5,277
27 Sep 1980	Plymouth Argyle	H	0–2		6,878
4 Oct 1980	Brentford	A	1–0	S.Lowndes	6,360
7 Oct 1980	Reading	H	0–0		5,545
11 Oct 1980	Portsmouth	H	2–1	K.Oakes 2	7,003
14 Oct 1980	Sheffield United	A	0–2		9,776
18 Oct 1980	Walsall	A	0–1		4,335
25 Oct 1980	Huddersfield Town	H	3–2	K.Oakes, S.Lowndes, D.Gwyther	6,403
28 Oct 1980	Fulham	H	2–1	J.Aldridge, OG	6,029
1 Nov 1980	Blackpool	A	4–2	K.Oakes 2, J.Aldridge, D.Gwyther	4,556
8 Nov 1980	Hull City	H	4–0	K.Oakes, D.Gwyther, N.Bailey, S.Lowndes	5,495
11 Nov 1980	Charlton Athletic	A	0–3		6,911
15 Nov 1980	Burnley	H	1–2	T.Tynan	5,370
29 Nov 1980	Rotherham United	A	0–1		5,512
3 Dec 1980	Chester	A	1–1	S.Lowndes	1,640
6 Dec 1980	Barnsley	H	0–0		5,537
13 Dec 1980	Chester	H	1–1	D.Gwyther	4,149
20 Dec 1980	Colchester United	A	0–1		2,160
26 Dec 1980	Swindon Town	H	0–2		7,086
27 Dec 1980	Exeter City	A	2–2	T.Tynan, D.Gwyther	6,295
3 Jan 1981	Sheffield United	H	4–0	D.Gwyther, S.Lowndes, K.Moore, T.Tynan	6,630
10 Jan 1981	Huddersfield Town	A	1–4	S.Lowndes	9,063
16 Jan 1981	Rotherham United	H	0–1		4,783
31 Jan 1981	Millwall	A	0–0		4,913
7 Feb 1981	Oxford United	A	1–0	D.Gwyther	4,440
14 Feb 1981	Gillingham	H	1–1	D.Gwyther	5,172
18 Feb 1981	Reading	A	1–1	S.Lowndes	3,876
21 Feb 1981	Plymouth Argyle	A	2–3	T.Tynan, D.Gwyther	4,315
28 Feb 1981	Chesterfield	H	5–1	T.Tynan 2, D.Gwyther, K.Oakes, S.Lowndes	5,340
7 Mar 1981	Brentford	H	1–1	T.Tynan	5,224
14 Mar 1981	Portsmouth	A	0–0		13,208
28 Mar 1981	Fulham	A	1–2	D.Gwyther	4,570
4 Apr 1981	Blackpool	H	3–1	J.Aldridge 2, A.Waddle	4,514
7 Apr 1981	Walsall	H	1–1	K.Moore	5,446
18 Apr 1981	Exeter City	H	2–1	T.Tynan, A.Waddle	5,231
20 Apr 1981	Swindon Town	A	1–1	A.Waddle	8,435
25 Apr 1981	Colchester United	H	1–0	J.Aldridge	4,619
2 May 1981	Barnsley	A	1–4	D.Gwyther	15,659
5 May 1981	Carlisle United	H	4–0	D.Gwyther 2, T.Tynan, N.Vaughan	3,748
7 May 1981	Hull City	A	1–3	K.Elsey	2,059

=== European Cup Winners' Cup ===
Round	Date	Opponents	Venue	Result	Scorers	Attendance	Notes
1–1	16 Sep 1980	Crusaders	Somerton Park	4–0	Bruton, Gwyther, Aldridge, Moore	6,285	
1–2	1 Oct 1980	Crusaders	Seaview	0–0		1,500	4–0 agg
2–1	22 Oct 1980	SK Haugar	Sakkestad Stadion	0–0		4,522	
2–2	4 Nov 1980	SK Haugar	Somerton Park	6–0	Tynan 2, Lowndes, Gwyther, Aldridge, Moore	8,855	6–0 agg
QF-1	4 Mar 1981	FC Carl Zeiss Jena	Ernst-Abbe-Sportfeld	2–2	Tynan 2	16,000	
QF-2	18 Mar 1981	FC Carl Zeiss Jena	Somerton Park	0–1		18,000	2–3 agg

=== FA Cup ===
Round	Date	Opponents	Venue	Result	Scorers	Attendance
1	22 Nov 1980	Plymouth Argyle	Home Park	0–2		6,719

=== Football League Cup ===
Round	Date	Opponents	Venue	Result	Scorers	Attendance	Notes
1–1	9 Aug 1980	Hereford United	Edgar Street	0–1		7,745	
1–2	12 Aug 1980	Hereford United	Somerton Park	5–0	Vaughan 2, Aldridge 2, Gwyther	5,683	5–1 agg
2–1	26 Aug 1980	Notts County	Somerton Park	1–1	Vaughan	6,708	
2–2	2 Sep 1980	Notts County	Meadow Lane	0–2		4,714	1–3 agg

=== Welsh Cup ===
Round	Date	Opponents	Venue	Result	Scorers	Attendance	Notes
3	17 Nov 1980	Worcester City	Somerton Park	2–2	Moore, Elsey	2,937	
3r	24 Nov 1980	Worcester City	St. George's Lane	3–2	Oakes, Lowndes, Aldridge	3,015	
4	6 Jan 1981	Ton Pentre	Somerton Park	3–0	Gwyther 2, Moore	2,949	
5	10 Feb 1981	Bangor City	Somerton Park	3–1	Oakes, Vaughan, Tynan	3,018	
SF-1	25 Mar 1981	Hereford United	Edgar Street	1–2	Moore	5,251	
SF-2	31 Mar 1981	Hereford United	Somerton Park	1–1	Lowndes	5,994	2–3 agg

== League table ==
Pos	Team	Pld	W	D	L	GF	GA	GD	Pts
10	Reading	46	18	10	18	62	62	0	46
11	Exeter City	46	16	13	17	62	66	−4	45
12	Newport County	46	15	13	18	64	61	+3	43
13	Fulham	46	15	13	18	57	64	−7	43
14	Oxford United	46	13	17	16	39	47	−8	43

Source: rsssf.com
