= Grant Davies (footballer) =

English footballer

Personal information
- Date of birth: 13 October 1959 (age 67)
- Place of birth: Barrow-in-Furness, England
- Position: Central defender

Youth career
- 1977–1978: Preston North End

Senior career*
Years	Team	Apps	(Gls)
1978–1983	Newport County	150	(1)
1983	→ Exeter City (loan)	7	(0)
	Gloucester City	0	(0)
	Risca United	0	(0)
	Cwmbran Town	0	(0)
Total		157	(1)

International career
- Wales U17
- * Club domestic league appearances and goals

Grant Davies (born 13 October 1959 in Barrow) is an English born former professional footballer and a youth international for Wales.

== Career ==
A centre half, Davies joined Newport County in 1978 from Preston North End, forming a long standing centre half pairing with Keith Oakes. Between 1978 and 1983 Davies made 150 league appearances for Newport, scoring 1 goal during the most successful period in the club's long history. Davies was part of the Newport County team that won promotion to the Football League Third Division, won the 1980 Welsh Cup and in the subsequent season reached the quarter-final of the 1981 European Cup Winners Cup. Davies won the 1982 Newport County player of the year award.

In 1983, he had a brief loan spell at Exeter City making 7 league appearances and subsequently retired from professional football to joining the police force.
