= Richard Walden =

English footballer

Personal information
- Date of birth: 4 May 1948
- Place of birth: Hereford, England
- Date of death: 19 November 2009 (aged 61)
- Place of death: Hampshire, England
- Height: 5 ft 11 in (1.80 m)
- Position: Right back

Senior career*
| Years | Team | Apps | (Gls) |
| 1964–1976 | Aldershot | 404 | (16) |
| 1975–1978 | Sheffield Wednesday | 100 | (1) |
| 1978–1982 | Newport County | 151 | (2) |
| 1982–19?? | Farnborough Town | | |
| Total | | 655 | (19) |
- * Club domestic league appearances and goals

Richard Walden (4 May 1948 – 19 November 2009) was an English professional footballer. A fullback, Walden played for Aldershot and Sheffield Wednesday before joining Newport County in 1978.

Walden played over 400 league games for Aldershot. He scored the opening goal for Aldershot in the 1970–71 Football League Cup against Manchester United, though Aldershot went on to lose 3–1.

Walden joined Newport County in 1978 and in doing so became the first player in British football to have the fee of £3,500 set by the transfer tribunal process.

Walden made 193 appearances for Newport scoring 3 goals during the most successful period in the club's long history. Walden was part of the team that won promotion to the Football League Third Division, won the 1980 Welsh Cup and in the subsequent season reached the quarter-final of the 1981 European Cup Winners' Cup.

In 1982, he joined Farnborough Town.

Walden died 19 November 2009 aged 61 after a long illness.
