= Nigel Vaughan =

Welsh footballer

Personal information
- Full name: Nigel Mark Vaughan
- Date of birth: 20 May 1959 (age 67)
- Place of birth: Caerleon, Wales
- Height: 5 ft 5 in (1.65 m)
- Position: Midfielder

Senior career*
Years	Team	Apps	(Gls)
1976–1983	Newport County	224	(32)
1983–1987	Cardiff City	149	(42)
1986–1987	→ Reading (loan)	5	(1)
1987–1990	Wolverhampton Wanderers	93	(10)
1990–1992	Hereford United	13	(1)

International career
1977	Wales Youth	2	(0)
1981	Wales U21	2	(0)
1982–1984	Wales	10	(0)
- * Club domestic league appearances and goals

Nigel Mark Vaughan (born 20 May 1959) is a Welsh former professional footballer who played as a midfielder. He gained ten international caps for Wales.

== Club career ==
=== Newport County ===
Vaughan was born in Caerleon. He started his playing career at his local professional side Newport County making 224 appearances and scoring 32 goals for the club. After leaving Caerleon Comprehensive School in 1975 he made his Football league debut against Rochdale as a left back at the age of 17 by manager Jimmy Scoular. The following week he played against Bournemouth FC in the FA Cup – both games finished goalless. His performances in both games were enough to get him two Welsh Youth National Team appearances against England (Wales were beat 2–3 on aggregate). Having signed as a professional in 1977 it was Newport County manager Len Ashurst that had the biggest influence on Vaughan's career. A manager that believed in him, and changed him into a centre midfield player during the most successful period in the club's long history.

In 1980, he played a pivotal role in helping Newport County to double success, by achieving promotion from the old Division 4 and winning the Welsh Cup against Shrewsbury Town (5–1 on aggregate). The following season County entered the European Cup Winners Cup, reaching the quarter-final losing 2–3 to Carl Zeiss Jena. He made two Welsh Under 21 National appearances as captain, against France (2–0) and the Netherlands (0–0).

=== Cardiff City ===
His stay at Newport ended in 1983 when he joined Cardiff City (managed by ex Newport boss Ashurst) in a five player transfer. He went on to make 149 professional appearances for Cardiff scoring 42 goals.

=== Reading ===
In 1987, he had loan spell at Reading FC, making 5 appearances and scoring 1 goal against Sheffield United.

=== Wolverhampton Wanderers ===
He moved to Wolverhampton Wanderers on a permanent basis the same year and went on to make 93 appearances for the club, scoring 10 goals. Vaughan enjoyed a successful time at Wolves in 1988, winning promotion from the Division 4 as champions. The same year they beat Burnley 2–0 in the 1988 Associate Members' Cup Final at Wembley. Wolves enjoyed another successful season in 1989 winning promotion from Division 3 (again as champions).

=== Hereford ===
After one more season at Wolves when they finished 12th in Division 2, Vaughan was released. He moved to Hereford United where he broke his right leg just 10 minutes into his debut for the club against Chelsea. He went on to make just 13 appearances for Hereford scoring 1 goal against Crewe Alexandra.

Vaughan's professional soccer career started in 1975 and ended in 1992, making 484 League appearances and scoring 86 goals. These statistics do not include cup matches. He played part-time and managed a number of part-time soccer clubs, playing his last game at the age of 40.

== International career ==
In 1982 Vaughan made his Welsh International debut, coming on as a second-half substitute in a 4–4 draw in Yugoslavia. The following year he made his full international debut in a 1–1 draw against Telê Santana's Brazil at Ninian Park on 12 June 1983. Vaughan played the full 90 minutes, lining up against Sócrates in midfield. He went on to play against Norway, Romania, Bulgaria, Yugoslavia, Northern Ireland, Israel and Spain under the leadership of manager Mike England. He also won two Welsh Youth Caps and two Welsh Under 21 Caps against France & Holland respectively.

== After retirement ==
Vaughan was at Hereford United when he took his English FA Preliminary Badge, and then passed his Advanced Coaching Licence at Lilleshall. In 1993 he was offered a part-time coaching role at Wolverhampton Wanderers under the guidance of Robert Kelly and Chris Evans.

He stayed at Wolves for more than eight years coaching the U15s & U16s on a part-time basis, working alongside Welsh former International manager Mike Smith and Steve Wheatley. During this period Vaughan coached a number of players who went on to become professional footballers – most notably Lee Naylor, Joleon Lescott, John Melligan, Scot Brown, Leon Clarke and Michael Townsend.

In 2001 Vaughan moved to Shrewsbury Town working as part-time under 16's coach, and the following season he was employed on a full-time basis as Youth team Coach of the U17s/U19s with Head of Youth Jamie Robinson (this was looking after 24 scholars on a day-to-day basis). It was in 2005 he became Acting Head of Youth after Robinson left the club which was overlooking age groups from under 9 – 16 whilst still coaching the full-time scholars with Steve Wheatley coming in as Head of the Centre of Excellence and full time Physio Rachel Greenley. During this time he also did his FA Conversion Badge, and UEFA A License. It was then after a year in charge that he was given the role of Head of Youth Development which he kept until 2010.

He helped in the development of fourteen players including Andre Gray, Connor Goldson, Jon Taylor, Ross Draper, Tom Bradshaw and Harry Hooman all went on to become professional players. Two have gone on to represent their country at international level, Dave Edwards and goalkeeper Joe Hart. During that time, he qualified with the English Football Association in getting his Youth Coaches Course 17 to 21 years of age and also UEFA A Refresher. From 2003 to 2010 Vaughan was invited by former manager Len Ashurst to coach at the Premier League exit trial, for under 18/19 scholars who were released by their clubs where he work for four years.

=== United States ===
In 2010 Vaughan signed a three-year contract with Albion Hurricanes FC in Houston, Texas, as Boys Director and was helped by Danny Hill, Dave Hill, Matt Jepson, Mark Rufo and Gregg Munslow.

On his 54th birthday in May 2013, Vaughan joined Texas Rush in The Woodlands, North of Houston where he his position was director of coaching the senior boys in The Woodlands (U15s to U19s) and in this time he passed his USSF B coaching licence with the help of Alex Cardenas and Steve Grave. In 2017 Texas Rush changed their name to Dynamo Dash Youth Soccer Club where he worked in the Competitive program and he bought a house in the Tomball, Houston, Texas area.

== Personal life ==
His son Gareth and daughter Erin are both coaching in Seattle, Washington. Gareth played locally around the Shropshire area and played with his father Nigel at Ludlow Town and Star FC out of Brignorth. Erin played for Shrewsbury Town Ladies & Aston Villa Ladies and achieved 19 full Welsh Caps and she finished off her playing at Issaquah Soccer Club Gunners ladies team in Issaquah, Washington.

In February 2018 Vaughan met Misdella Mechela Perez a Cuban lady and after a three-year courtship, they decided to get married on Friday 1 July 2021 in Richmond, Houston, Texas. After working for nine years in The Woodlands under the leadership of Don Gemmell, Vaughan was asked by Gemmell if he wanted to move to Dynamo West programme in Katy/Fulshear, Texas where he is under the guidance of Ristic Radojica. Vaughan accepted the position on 1st March and moved house at the end of the Spring Season 2022 from Tomball to Mission Bend, in Houston, Texas.

In May 2024 Vaughan went to the dermatologist as his wife Mechela was concerned about a black spot under his left ear. On 23rd May he was diagnosed with melanoma. Thanks to Dr Jennifer McQuade of MD Anderson Cancer Centre in Houston, the cancer was controlled. It took more than a year for the chemotherapy treatment to clear Vaughan of his cancer in September 2024.

On 1st November 2024 Vaughan went to see his friend Danny Hill's wife Kelly to apply for US citizenship by filing online. On Saturday 11th January 2025 the US government swore Vaughan in with 1500 others to become a US citizen.

== Honours ==
Newport County

- Welsh Cup: 1979–80
- Football League Fourth Division third-place promotion: 1979–80

Wolverhampton Wanderers

- Football League Third Division: 1988–89
- Football League Fourth Division: 1987–88
- Associate Members' Cup: 1987–88

Individual

- Newport County Player of the Season: 1979–80
