= Steve Lowndes =

Welsh footballer

Personal information
- Full name: Stephen Robert Lowndes
- Date of birth: 17 June 1960 (age 66)
- Place of birth: Newport, Wales
- Height: 5 ft 10 in (1.78 m)
- Position: Wide midfielder

Youth career
- 1974–1976: Monmouth Town

Senior career*
Years	Team	Apps	(Gls)
1977–1983	Newport County	208	(39)
1983–1986	Millwall	96	(10)
1986–1990	Barnsley	116	(20)
1990–1992	Hereford United	49	(4)
1992–1996	Newport County	150	(12)
Total		617	(85)

International career
1983–1988	Wales	10	(0)
- * Club domestic league appearances and goals

Stephen Robert Lowndes (born 17 June 1960) is a former Wales international footballer. Lowndes started his career at Newport County during the most successful period in the club's long history. Lowndes was part of the team that won promotion to the Football League Third Division, won the 1980 Welsh Cup and in the subsequent season reached the quarter-final of the 1981 European Cup Winners Cup.

Millwall signed him from Newport County for £55,000 in August 1983 and he was sold to Barnsley in 1986 for £40,000.

== Coaching ==
After retiring from playing he became physio to the Wales international team for five years. After gaining BA Hons Degree (1999) & P.G.C.E. in physical education (2000) in June 2000 was appointed Academy Director at Cirencester Football Academy and helped develop professional players such as James Constable, Matt Green, Chris Zebroski and Stuart Nelson. He has also led the academy to a number of honor's over the years. ESFA Under 18's Colleges' Trophy winners 2000, 2002, 2005, and 2012. The academy has consistently competed in the F.A. Youth Cup defeating a number of professional youth teams. He is a UEFA 'A' Licence Coach, a qualified Sports Therapist as well as holding a B.A. (Hons) Degree and P.G.C.E. Physical Education (qualified teacher status).
