= Dave Gwyther =

Welsh footballer (born 1948)

Personal information
- Full name: David Gwyther
- Date of birth: 6 December 1948 (age 77)
- Place of birth: Swansea, Wales
- Height: 5 ft 10 in (1.78 m)
- Position: Forward

Senior career*
Years	Team	Apps	(Gls)
1965–1973	Swansea City	218	(58)
1973–1976	Halifax Town	104	(26)
1976–1980	Rotherham United	162	(45)
1980–1983	Newport County	105	(29)
1981–1982	→ Crewe Alexandra (loan)	7	(1)
1983–1984	Port Talbot Athletic	?	(?)
1984	Newport County	2	(0)
- * Club domestic league appearances and goals

David Gwyther (born 6 December 1948) is a former Wales Under-23 international footballer.

== Career ==
A tall, strong striker he began his career with Swansea Town and was their top scorer for four successive seasons scoring 60 goals in 216 matches. In 1971 Gwyther was selected for the Football Association of Wales tour of Tahiti, New Zealand, Australia and Malaysia but these matches were not classed as international cap matches.

He moved on to Halifax Town and Rotherham United.

In 1979, he joined Newport County and partnered John Aldridge and Tommy Tynan during the most successful period in the club's history. Gwyther played in the team that won promotion to the Football League Third Division, won the 1980 Welsh Cup and in the subsequent season reached the quarter-final of the 1981 European Cup Winners Cup.

He finished his career with Crewe Alexandra and Port Talbot Town.
