= Jack Keay =

Scottish footballer

John Paul Keay (born 14 June 1960 in Glasgow) is a Scottish former footballer. Keay, a central defender, began his football career as a junior with Celtic, but never played for the first team. He moved to England where he made more than 300 appearances in the Football League, scoring 20 goals in 155 League games for Shrewsbury Town and 9 goals in 156 League games for Wrexham.

Keay joined Derry City in the League of Ireland in July 1986 and achieved status at the Brandywell by helping the club to a historic 'treble' during his captaincy in the 1988–89 season.

== Honours ==
- League of Ireland
  - Derry City F.C. 1988/89
- FAI Cup
  - Derry City F.C. 1989
- League of Ireland Cup
  - Derry City F.C. 1988/89
  - Player of the Year
  - Derry City F.C. 1986/87
