= Kevin Moore (footballer, born 1956) =

English footballer

Personal information
- Date of birth: 30 January 1956 (age 70)
- Place of birth: Blackpool, England
- Position: Left winger

Senior career*
Years	Team	Apps	(Gls)
1974–1977	Blackpool	39	(3)
1977	→ Bury (loan)	4	(0)
1977–1979	Swansea City	55	(6)
1979–1983	Newport County	148	(13)
1983	→ Swindon Town (loan)	1	(0)
Total		247	(22)
- * Club domestic league appearances and goals

Kevin John Moore (born 30 January 1956) is an English retired professional footballer, who played as a winger.

After making his debut in 1973 aged 17 Moore made 38 English Football League appearances for Blackpool between 1973 and 1977, scoring three goals in the process, followed by a loan spell at Bury. Moore joined Swansea City in 1977 and was an ever present during the promotion season from the 4th division when John Toshack became player manager. Moore then joined Newport County in 1978. Between 1978 and 1983 Moore made 148 appearances for Newport, scoring fourteen goals during the most successful period in the club's long history. Moore was part of the team that won promotion and the Welsh Cup, and in the subsequent season reached the quarter-final of the 1981 European Cup Winners Cup losing 1 0 to Carl Zeis Jena at Somerton Park where Newport dominated the game. Moore scored 2 goals in Europe 1 in each home game against Belfast Crusaders and Hauger of Norway.

In 1983, he had a brief loan spell at Swindon Town, Moore was inducted into the Newport County Hall of Fame in 2009. After retiring Moore returned to Blackpool and has been MD of Thistleton Lodge Care Home since 1986. Now spends a lot of his time in the USA being a member of Lake Nona Golf and Country Club home to several European Ryder Cup team members.
