= Steve Cross (footballer) =

English footballer and manager

Personal information
- Full name: Stephen Charles Cross
- Date of birth: 22 December 1959 (age 66)
- Place of birth: Wolverhampton, England
- Height: 5 ft 10 in (1.78 m)
- Positions: Defender; midfielder

Senior career*
Years	Team	Apps	(Gls)
1976–1986	Shrewsbury Town	262	(33)
1986–1991	Derby County	73	(3)
1991–1993	Bristol Rovers	43	(2)
- Mangotsfield United
- Bath City

Managerial career
- 1993: Bristol Rovers (caretaker)
- * Club domestic league appearances and goals

Stephen Charles Cross (born 22 December 1959) is a former professional footballer from Wolverhampton.

Cross began his career at Shrewsbury Town, following a written request for a trial. He made 262 appearances, scoring 33 goals for the club. After leaving Shrewsbury he played for Derby County and Bristol Rovers. Following the departure of Malcolm Allison as Bristol Rovers manager, Cross was appointed caretaker manager for three games, until the appointment of John Ward. Following this, Cross dropped down to play in non-league football for Mangotsfield United and Bath City.

== Post-retirement ==
After retiring from Football, Cross briefly worked for the Royal Mail before he went on to develop a career in media, and after several guest appearances as co-commentator on BBC Radio Shropshire for Shrewsbury Town games, Cross took on the role for every game, entertaining listeners with his over-exuberant style of co-commentary.
