= Neil Bailey =

English footballer (born 1958)

Personal information
- Full name: Neil Bailey
- Date of birth: 26 September 1958 (age 68)
- Place of birth: Wigan, England
- Height: 5 ft 9 in (1.75 m)
- Position: Midfielder

Senior career*
Years	Team	Apps	(Gls)
1978–1983	Newport County	134	(7)
1983–1986	Wigan Athletic	41	(2)
1986–1988	Stockport County	51	(0)
1986–1987	→ Newport County (loan)	9	(1)
1992–1994	Blackpool	9	(0)
Total		235	(10)
- * Club domestic league appearances and goals

Neil Bailey (born 26 September 1958) is an English former footballer. He played as a midfielder.

He began his career at Newport County in the early 1980s, during the most successful period in the club's history. Bailey was part of the team that won promotion and the Welsh Cup and, in the subsequent season, reached the quarter-finals of the 1980–81 European Cup Winners' Cup. Bailey made 134 appearances for Newport, scoring seven goals.

He joined his hometown club, Wigan Athletic, in 1983. He spent three years at Springfield Park, making 41 league appearances and scoring two goals.

In 1986, Bailey joined Stockport County and went on to make a half-century of appearances for the Greater Manchester club. During his time at Edgeley Park, he was loaned out to his first club, Newport County.

Bailey retired from playing in 1988, but stayed on at Stockport County as a coach.

In 1992, Bailey joined Billy Ayre's Blackpool, also as a coach, but occasionally took to the field as an emergency fill-in when injuries dictated.

Bailey was later a youth team coach at Manchester United and then a coach for the Professional Footballers' Association between 2002 and 2007.

In January 2007 Roy Keane was appointed team manager of Sunderland and he appointed Bailey as first team coach. When Keane resigned in December 2008 Bailey was promoted to joint Assistant Manager with Dwight Yorke under caretaker manager Ricky Sbragia. Steve Bruce was appointed Sunderland manager in July 2009 with Sbragia and Bailey subsequently being released by Sunderland.

In 2010 Bailey rejoined the PFA as a Regional Coach Educator in North West England.
