= Jake King (footballer, born 1955) =

Scottish footballer and manager

Personal information
- Date of birth: 29 January 1955 (age 71)
- Place of birth: Glasgow, Scotland
- Position: Full back

Youth career
- Shrewsbury Town

Senior career*
Years	Team	Apps	(Gls)
1971–1982	Shrewsbury Town	306	(20)
1982–1985	Wrexham	92	(5)
1985–1986	Cardiff City	30	(0)
- Limerick City
Total		428	(25)

Managerial career
- 19xx–1999: Telford United
- 1997–1999: Shrewsbury Town
- 20xx–2004: Telford United
- * Club domestic league appearances and goals

Jake King (born 29 January 1955) is a Scottish football manager and former professional player.

== Career ==
=== Playing career ===
King, who played as a full back, began as an apprentice with Shrewsbury Town, before making his professional debut in 1971. King made a total of 306 appearances in the Football League for Shrewsbury, scoring 20 goals, before leaving in 1982 to join Wrexham. At Wrexham, King made 92 League appearances, scoring 5 goals. On 3 October 1984, away to FC Porto in the first round of the UEFA Cup Winners' Cup, he scored twice in the first half of a 4–3 away defeat as Wrexham beat the Portuguese on the away goals rule. King's final League club was Cardiff City, where he made 30 appearances, before joining Limerick City in Ireland.

=== Coaching career ===
In 1987, King advised then Shrewsbury Town player David Moyes to his first coaching role, at Concord College.

King left his position as manager of Telford United to manage former club Shrewsbury Town in May 1997; he was sacked in November 1999. He later returned to Telford United, before being sacked in April 2004.

King was appointed First Team Coach at Aberystwyth Town in June 2009.

== Business interests ==
King worked as a chef before his professional playing career and since has also run restaurants. He ran a restaurant in Ireland for five years, commuting from England to personally run the kitchen. He later acquired a public house called The Cross Gates at Ford near Shrewsbury which three years later he converted into a restaurant called Smokestop BBQ, and ran it as an American smokehouse with his wife and son before selling the business in 2016.

== Personal life ==
Another of King's sons, Jordan, is also a footballer, and played under his father at Telford United.
