= David Tong (footballer) =

English footballer

Personal information
- Full name: David Joseph Tong
- Date of birth: 21 September 1955 (age 71)
- Place of birth: Blackpool, England
- Height: 5 ft 9 in (1.75 m)
- Position: Midfielder

Senior career*
Years	Team	Apps	(Gls)
1974–1978	Blackpool	78	(7)
1978–1982	Shrewsbury Town	160	(8)
1982–1985	Cardiff City	120	(3)
1985	→ Rochdale (loan)	2	(0)
1985–1986	Bristol City	19	(0)
1986	Gillingham	5	(0)
1986–1987	Cambridge United	6	(0)
1987–?	Merthyr Tydfil	?	(?)
- * Club domestic league appearances and goals

David Joseph Tong (born 21 September 1955) is an English former professional footballer.

Tong began his career at his hometown club, Blackpool, making his first-team debut against Norwich City on the opening day of the 1974-75 season. He played for the club during the previous spring, at the "Caligaris" International Tournament in Italy. He scored one of Blackpool's goals in their 3–1 victory over Napoli in the final.

He left the club in September 1978 to sign for Shrewsbury Town and went on to play in nearly two hundred matches for the club before being released in 1982. He joined Cardiff City and helped the side to promotion in his first year before being ever-present the following season. He eventually lost his place in the side and, after a loan spell at Rochdale, was allowed to join Bristol City in 1985. His spell at Bristol was short and he spent time at Gillingham and Cambridge United in 1986 before joining non-league side Merthyr Tydfil.

After retiring from football, Tong worked as a postman for Royal Mail in Blackpool.
