= Gary Plumley =

English footballer

Personal information
- Date of birth: 24 March 1956 (age 70)
- Place of birth: Birmingham, England
- Height: 6 ft 0 in (1.83 m)
- Position: Goalkeeper

Youth career
- Leicester City

Senior career*
Years	Team	Apps	(Gls)
1974–1976	Leicester City	0	(0)
1976–1981	Newport County	182	(0)
1981–1982	Happy Valley		
1982	Hereford United	13	(0)
1982	→ Newport County	2	(0)
1982–1983	Happy Valley		
1983–1985	Cardiff City	25	(0)
1984–1985	→ Newport County (loan)	2	(0)
1985–1987	Ebbw Vale	1	(0)
1987	Newport County	1	(0)
1987	Watford	0	(0)
- Ebbw Vale
- * Club domestic league appearances and goals

Gary Plumley (born 24 March 1956) is an English former professional footballer who played in the Football League for Newport County, Hereford United and Cardiff City, and in the Hong Kong First Division League for Happy Valley.

A goalkeeper, Plumley made 187 appearances for Newport County in four spells with the club between 1976 and 1987. He was part of the team that won the Welsh Cup and were promoted to the Third Division in the 1979–80 season, and in the subsequent season reached the quarter-final of the 1981 European Cup Winners Cup, holding eventual runners-up Carl Zeiss Jena to a draw in the away leg before losing 1–0 at home.

Plumley also played for Hereford United, Cardiff City, Happy Valley and Ebbw Vale.

Plumley's father Eddie was chief executive of Watford, a family connection which led to him making a one-off appearance in the 1987 FA Cup semi-final. Watford goalkeeper Tony Coton broke a finger two weeks before the game leaving manager Graham Taylor needing to find cover for Steve Sherwood after the transfer deadline. In desperation, Taylor suggested to Eddie Plumley that they sign his son, who had by then retired from football. Plumley signed, Sherwood dislocated a finger, so Plumley played; Tottenham Hotspur won the match 4–1. No fee had been agreed at the time but Graham Taylor wanted to pay Plumley. A few weeks later he received a cheque and went straight out and bought a fridge with it. They called it the Watford fridge.

Plumley became an estate agent in Newport. He is married to Debbie Johnsey, who represented Great Britain at show jumping at the 1976 Montreal Olympics. Their daughter Gemma Plumley is also an accomplished show jumper.
