= Somerton Park =

Sports venue in Newport, Wales

Coordinates: 51°35′0.97″N 2°57′54.52″W

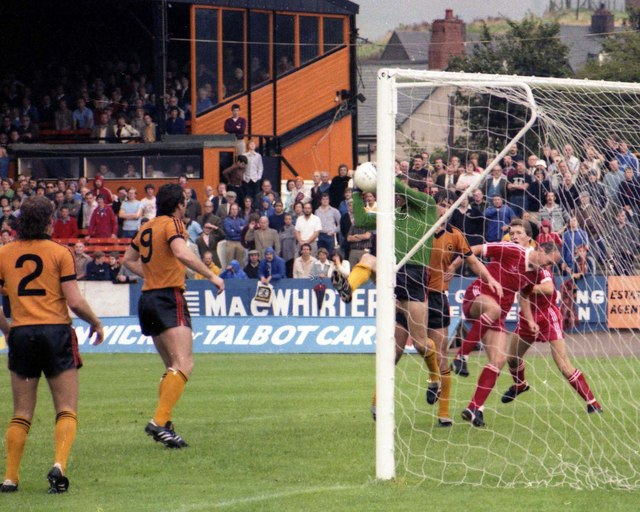
- 1st plays 4th in the third tier at Somerton Park (Newport County vs Oxford United, 12 September 1981)
- Interactive map of Somerton Park
- Location: Cromwell Road, Newport
- Owner: Demolished
- Operator: W.R. Lysaght's Works Committee and Newport City Council (both former)
- Capacity: 25,000

Construction
- Opened: 1912, reopened 1990
- Closed: 1989, and 1992
- Demolished: 1993

Tenants
- Newport County A.F.C. Newport Wasps; Greyhound racing

Somerton Park was a football, greyhound racing and speedway stadium in Newport, South Wales.

== Football ==
In April 1912, Newport County had been accepted to play in the Southern League for the 1912–13 season. Shortly afterwards, the site for the ground was obtained by the club's chairman Bert Moss.

The stadium was nearly sold for housing in June 1919, but it was bought and transferred to a committee of employees from the steel works operated by John Lysaght and Co..

In September 1963, the stadium was put up for sale by the greyhound racing owners and Newport County appealed to the Newport Council for a £30,000 loan to help to buy the ground from them.

It remained the home of Newport County through many reformations until the club went bankrupt on 27 February 1989. County's 77 years at the stadium had brought many highs and lows, the most notable being the Welsh Cup and Fourth Division promotion triumph in 1980 and the European Cup Winners' Cup quarter-final appearance in 1981, but the final few years brought the trauma of two successive relegations which saw the club lose its Football League status after 68 years, and finally go out of business on 27 February 1989. County were members of the Football Conference that season but their bankruptcy saw them expelled from that league for being unable to fulfill their fixtures.

The club was again reformed within four months and began the 1989–90 season as a Hellenic League side. The new club's first season was spent in Moreton-in-Marsh, followed by two seasons at Somerton Park, the next two seasons were played in Gloucester before finally settling at the newly built Newport Stadium for the 1994–95 season, where the club played their home matches until moving to Rodney Parade in 2012. By 1993, Somerton Park had been redeveloped as a housing estate.

The stadium's record attendance was 24,268 for a Football League Third Division South match between County and arch-rivals Cardiff City on 16 October 1937.

== Speedway ==
The stadium was home to the Newport Wasps speedway team between 1964 and 1977, attracting some the biggest names in the sport. The tight track meant that turf had to be brought on to make the corner flag area for football matches and removed once the match had finished.

== Greyhound racing ==
=== Origins ===
Following the success of the greyhound racing at Cardiff Arms Park which opened in 1927, the Arms Park Greyhound Racing Company Limited decided to construct another track around the football pitch at Somerton Park. On 17 November 1932, the first greyhound meeting took place at the stadium.

The track was one of fifty affiliated to the National Greyhound Racing Society (NGRS) in 1932 and would run under National Greyhound Racing Club. The same Arms Park greyhound trainers would also supply the greyhounds for the Somerton Park; the kennels of the trainers were based at nearby being kennelled at Cefn Mably.

The principal event was the Monmouthshire Stakes and the circumference of the track was 384 yards with small straights of 60 yards but wide sweeping bends. Race distances were 450, 600, and 640 yards and there was a glass fronted enclosure above the grandstand for viewing the racing.

The venue was popular and the management formed a close relationship with the football team for over thirty years. The twice-weekly meetings were held every Tuesday and Friday. During the early 1960s, the venue began to experience lower attendances and by 1963, the decision was taken to close the track.

An attendance of just 700 gathered to witness the final night's racing. The last race resulted in a no race when the traps opened too soon and the greyhounds charged around the track without the hare. Len Davies, secretary at Somerton Park, told a local newspaper: "Some of the best dogs in the country have raced at Somerton Park. Perhaps the best of them all was Antarctica, a white bitch which set a track 450 yards record in a Somerton Stakes heat in 1958".

=== Competitions ===
- Monmouthshire Stakes

=== Track records ===
Yards	Time	Date
450y	25.37	1947
640y	37.75	1947

== See also ==
- Rodney Parade
- Lliswerry
- Newport County A.F.C
- Lovells Athletic F.C.
