= 1979–80 Welsh Cup =

1979–80 Welsh Football Association Challenge Cup
Welsh Senior Cup

Tournament details
- Country: Wales; England

Final positions
- Champions: Newport County
- Runners-up: Shrewsbury Town

The 1979–80 Welsh Cup was the 93rd season of the main domestic football cup competition in Wales, the Welsh Cup.

== Qualifying round ==
Tie no	Home team	Score	Away team	Notes
1	Llandudno Town	1–3	Rhos United	
2	Conwy United	11–1	British Steel	
3	Llandudno Amateurs	1–2	Abergele United	
4	Llanfair Caereinion	5–1	Ffostrasol Wanderers	
5	Barmouth & Dyffryn United	0–2	Aber AC	
6	Rhayader Town	4–3	Montgomery Town	
7	Abergavenny Thursdays	1–2	Spencer Works Newport	
8	Talgarth	1–8	Taff's Well	
9	Trelewis	1–3	Brecon Corinthians	

== First round ==
Tie no	Home team	Score	Away team	Notes
1	Pwllheli & District	2–0	Porthmadog	
2	Connah's Quay Nomads	6–2	Abergele United	
3	Rhos United	0–6	Colwyn Bay	at Colwyn Bay
4	Conwy United	1–0	Caernarfon Town	
5	Courtaulds Greenfield	0–3	Flint Town United	
6	Blaenau Ffestiniog	0–1	Nantlle Vale	
7	Llay Welfare	1–2	Gresford Athletic	
8	Ruthin	2–2	Chirk AAA	
Replay	Chirk AAA	0–2	Ruthin	
9	Mold Alexandra	0–5	Brymbo Steelworks	
10	Denbigh Town	1–3	Druids United	
11	Bridgnorth Town	0–1	Kidderminster Harriers	
12	Stourbridge	2–1	Brierley Hill Alliance	
13	Newtown	8–0	Rhayader Town	
14	Caersws	1–1	Towyn	Towyn dismissed – ineligible player
15	Presteigne St Andrews	6–2	Knighton Town	
16	Machynlleth	2–0	Welshpool	
17	Llanfair Caereinion	2–1	Aberystwyth Town	at Aberystwyth
18	Berriew	4–2	Aber AC	
19	Llanidloes Town	3–2	Llandrindod Wells	
20	Brecon Corinthians	2–3	Afan Lido	
21	Taff's Well	1–5	Bridgend Town	at Bridgend
22	Sully	0–3	Barry Town	
23	Cardiff Corinthians	0–0	Ferndale Athletic	
Replay	Ferndale Athletic	3–1	Cardiff Corinthians	
24	Caerau	2–1	Abercynon Athletic	
25	Aberaman Athletic	2–0	Caerleon	
26	Ebbw Vale	0–2	Pontllanfraith	
27	Newport YMCA	2–4	Maesteg Park Athletic	
28	Spencer Works Newport	7–0	South Glamorgan Institute	
29	Merthyr Tydfil	2–1	Briton Ferry Athletic	
30	Pontardawe Athletic	1–4	Pembroke Borough	
31	Haverfordwest County	4–1	Morriston Town	
32	Milford United	4–0	Llanelli	
33	BP Llandarcy	1–0	Ammanford Town	

== Second round ==
Tie no	Home team	Score	Away team	Notes
1	Rhyl	2–3	Colwyn Bay	
2	Connah's Quay Nomads	5–0	Gresford Athletic	
3	Flint Town United	0–3	Brymbo Steelworks	
4	Ruthin	1–1	Druids United	
Replay	Druids United	1–3	Ruthin	
5	Conwy United	2–6	Oswestry Town	
6	Pwllheli & District	0–3	Nantlle Vale	
7	Machynlleth	0–1	Berriew	
8	Newtown	4–0	Llanfair Caereinion	
9	Caersws	1–2	Kidderminster Harriers	
10	Presteigne St Andrews	2–1	Llanidloes Town	
11	Maesteg Park Athletic	3–2	Haverfordwest County	
12	Bridgend Town	3–0	Spencer Works Newport	
13	Merthyr Tydfil	3–1	Aberaman Athletic	
14	Stourbridge	2–3	BP Llandarcy	
15	Ferndale Athletic	0–1	Caerau	
16	Ton Pentre	2–1	Pembroke Borough	
17	Milford United	1–1	Barry Town	
Replay	Barry Town	4–0	Milford United	
18	Afan Lido	2–4	Pontllanfraith	

== Third round ==
Tie no	Home team	Score	Away team	Notes
1	Oswestry Town	6–0	Berriew	
2	Bangor City	3–0	Presteigne St Andrews	
3	Nantlle Vale	3–0	Newtown	
4	Druids United	1–2	Connah's Quay Nomads	
5	Brymbo Steelworks	4–0	Colwyn Bay	
6	Merthyr Tydfil	4–0	Caerau	
7	Kidderminster Harriers	2–1	Maesteg Park Athletic	
8	Worcester City	7–0	BP Llandarcy	
9	Pontllanfraith	3–1	Ton Pentre	
10	Barry Town	4–1	Bridgend Town	

== Fourth round ==
Tie no	Home team	Score	Away team	Notes
1	Wrexham	5–0	Connah's Quay Nomads	
2	Nantlle Vale	2–1	Brymbo Steelworks	
3	Shrewsbury Town	2–2	Oswestry Town	
Replay	Oswestry Town	1–6	Shrewsbury Town	
4	Chester	1–1	Bangor City	
Replay	Bangor City	0–2	Chester	
5	Swansea City	2–0	Pontllanfraith	
6	Newport County	2–0	Cardiff City	
7	Kidderminster Harriers	1–0	Worcester City	
8	Merthyr Tydfil	4–2	Barry Town	

== Fifth round ==
Tie no	Home team	Score	Away team	Notes
1	Merthyr Tydfil	1–0	Chester	
2	Wrexham	0–1	Newport County	
3	Swansea City	2–0	Kidderminster Harriers	
4	Nantlle Vale	1–4	Shrewsbury Town	Played at Shrewsbury

== Semi-finals ==
Tie no	Home team	Score	Away team	Notes
1	Newport County	3–1	Merthyr Tydfil	
2	Swansea City	2–2	Shrewsbury Town	
Replay	Shrewsbury Town	2–2	Swansea City	Shrewsbury Town win 6–5 on penalties

== Final ==
=== First leg ===
6 May 1980
19:45 BST

Newport County	2–1	Shrewsbury Town
Tynan 2	Report	Own goal

Somerton Park, Newport
Attendance: 9,950
Referee: R Bridges (Deeside)

Newport County	Shrewsbury Town

=== Second leg ===
12 May 1980
19:45 BST

Shrewsbury Town	0–3	Newport County
	Report	Tynan; Lowndes; Gwyther

Gay Meadow, Shrewsbury
Attendance: 8,993
Referee: R Bridges (Deeside)

Shrewsbury Town	Newport County
