= Tommy Tynan =

English footballer

Personal information
- Full name: Thomas Edward Tynan
- Date of birth: 17 November 1955 (age 70)
- Place of birth: Liverpool, England
- Height: 5 ft 11 in (1.80 m)
- Position: Striker

Senior career*
Years	Team	Apps	(Gls)
1971–1976	Liverpool	0	(0)
1975	→ Swansea City (loan)	6	(6)
1976	Dallas Tornado	17	(2)
1976–1978	Sheffield Wednesday	91	(31)
1978	Lincoln City	9	(1)
1978–1983	Newport County	183	(66)
1983–1985	Plymouth Argyle	80	(43)
1985–1986	Rotherham United	32	(13)
1986	→ Plymouth Argyle (loan)	9	(10)
1986–1990	Plymouth Argyle	173	(73)
1990–1991	Torquay United	35	(13)
1991–1992	Doncaster Rovers	11	(1)
Total		646	(259)

Managerial career
- 1990–1991: Torquay United (player-coach)
- 1993–1994: Goole Town
- * Club domestic league appearances and goals

Thomas Edward Tynan (born 17 November 1955) is an English retired professional footballer.

A hard working striker with flowing blonde hair, Tynan was signed as an apprentice for Liverpool by manager Bill Shankly after winning a talent contest run by the Liverpool Echo newspaper, but he never made a first-team appearance for the Reds, and was transferred to Sheffield Wednesday in 1976, where he spent two years and scored 31 goals.

After just nine appearances for Lincoln City in 1978, Tynan moved on to Newport County where he formed a dynamic striking partnership with John Aldridge as the Newport team gained promotion to the Football League Third Division, won the 1980 Welsh Cup and in the subsequent season reached the quarter-final of the 1981 European Cup Winners Cup. Tynan scored both goals in the away leg against Carl Zeiss Jena of East Germany, the equalising goal being in the 90th minute but Newport lost the home leg 1–0. In total Tynan scored 66 goals in 183 matches during the most successful period in the club's history.

In 1983, Tynan moved on to Plymouth Argyle where he became a cult figure during the 1980s and is frequently named by Argyle fans as one of the club's all-time greatest players. He was a member of the side which reached the semi-finals of the FA Cup in 1984, scoring the goal which beat then top flight West Bromwich Albion in the fifth round of the competition. Argyle went on to beat Derby County in the quarter-finals before losing to Watford in the penultimate stage of the competition.

In the 1984/85 season, Tynan was joint top scorer in all 4 divisions of the Football League with 31 goals, level with Tranmere's John Clayton. Clayton, ironically, joined Argyle as Tynan's replacement, when Tynan signed for Rotherham United in the summer of 1985. However, Tynan rejoined Argyle in early 1986, initially on loan, as the club pushed for promotion to the second tier. His excellent goalscoring record continued at that level and he became a club legend. In total Tynan scored 126 goals in 262 appearances for Plymouth. Former England manager Graham Taylor described him as one of the best natural finishers he had ever seen.

Tynan spent a season as manager of Goole Town in the Northern Premier League between 1993 and 1994.

As of January 2017 he was working as a taxi driver in Plymouth. He previously wrote a regular column about Argyle for local newspaper, the Plymouth Evening Herald. Tynan's biography was published in March 2009, entitled "The Original Football Idol: The Tommy Tynan story" by Ryan Danes (Breedon Books ISBN 978-1-85983-685-9). He was also the subject of the 1990 book Tommy: A Life at the Soccer Factory by Richard Cowdrey (Bud Books ISBN 9780951635001)
