= 1983–84 Cardiff City F.C. season =

Welsh football club season

Cardiff City
1983–84 season
- Chairman: Jack Leonard
- Manager: Len Ashurst/Jimmy Goodfellow & Jimmy Mullen
- Football League Second Division: 15th
- FA Cup: 3rd round
- League Cup: 2nd round
- Welsh Cup: 5th round
- Top goalscorer: League: Gordon Owen (14); All: Gordon Owen (18)
- Highest home attendance: 14,580 (v Swansea, 26 December 1983)
- Lowest home attendance: 3,870 (v Shrewsbury, 17 March 1983)
- Average home league attendance: 7,016

The 1983–84 season was Cardiff City F.C.'s 57th season in the Football League. They competed in the 22-team Division Two, then the second tier of English football, finishing fifteenth.

Manager Len Ashurst resigned to become Sunderland manager towards the end of the season and his assistant Jimmy Goodfellow and defender Jimmy Mullen were appointed joint caretaker managers for the remainder of the season.

== Players ==
Note: Flags indicate national team as defined under FIFA eligibility rules; some limited exceptions apply. Players may hold more than one non-FIFA nationality.

Pos.	Nation	Player
GK	WAL	Andy Dibble
GK	ENG	Gary Plumley
DF	ENG	Gary Bennett
DF	WAL	Paul Bodin
DF	WAL	Phil Dwyer
DF	WAL	David Grant
DF	WAL	Linden Jones
DF	ENG	Jimmy Mullen
DF	ENG	Colin Smith
MF	SCO	Marshall Burke
MF	WAL	Karl Elsey
MF	ENG	Russell Heycock
MF	ENG	Roger Gibbins
MF	WAL	John Lewis

Pos.	Nation	Player
MF	WAL	Wayne Matthews
MF	ENG	Gordon Owen
MF	ENG	David Tong
MF	WAL	Nigel Vaughan
FW	ENG	Ian Baird
FW	ENG	Andy Crawford
FW	ENG	Paul Evans
FW	ENG	Martin Goldsmith
FW	ENG	Jeff Hemmerman
FW	ENG	Trevor Lee
FW	WAL	Chris Rodon
FW	WAL	Chris Townsend
FW	ENG	Phil Walker

== League standings ==
Pos	Team	Pld	W	D	L	GF	GA	GD	Pts
13	Charlton Athletic	42	16	9	17	53	64	−11	57
14	Barnsley	42	15	7	20	57	53	+4	52
15	Cardiff City	42	15	6	21	53	66	−13	51
16	Portsmouth	42	14	7	21	73	64	+9	49
17	Middlesbrough	42	12	13	17	41	47	−6	49

Rules for classification: 1) Points; 2) Goal difference; 3) Goals scored

=== Results by round ===
Round	1	2	3	4	5	6	7	8	9	10	11	12	13	14	15	16	17	18	19	20	21	22	23	24	25	26	27	28	29	30	31	32	33	34	35	36	37	38	39	40	41	42
Ground	A	H	H	A	A	H	H	H	A	H	A	A	A	H	A	H	A	H	A	H	A	A	A	H	A	H	H	A	H	A	H	A	H	A	H	H	A	H	A	H	A	H
Result	L	W	W	L	L	D	L	W	L	L	W	L	L	W	L	W	L	L	L	W	W	L	D	W	W	L	L	L	W	W	W	L	D	D	W	L	L	W	L	D	D	L
Position			5	9	13	12	18	16	17	18	15	16	17	17	17	16	17	17	19	15	15	15	17	15	13	15	15	18		16	13	14	14	14	12	13	15	13		14		15
Points	0	3	6	6	6	7	7	10	10	10	13	13	13	16	16	19	19	19	19	22	25	25	26	29	32	32	32	32	35	38	41	41	42	43	46	46	46	49	49	50	51	51

Source: Competitive matches
A = Away; H = Home; W = Win; D = Draw; L = Loss

== Fixtures and results ==
=== Second Division ===
27 August 1983 1	Charlton Athletic	2–0	Cardiff City	London
15:00	Kevin Smith; Chris Jones			Stadium: The Valley; Attendance: 4,525

29 August 1983 2	Cardiff City	2–1	Manchester City	Cardiff
15:00	Paul Bodin 4', 75'		54' Jim Tolmie	Stadium: Ninian Park; Attendance: 8,899; Referee: Trevor Spencer (Wootton Bassett)

3 September 1983 3	Cardiff City	3–1	Grimsby Town	Cardiff
15:00	Gordon Owen 49', 64' (pen.); Andy Crawford 72'		44' Joe Waters	Stadium: Ninian Park; Attendance: 5,135; Referee: Lester Shapter (Paignton)

6 September 1983 4	Shrewsbury Town	1–0	Cardiff City	Shrewsbury
19:30	Chic Bates 3'			Stadium: Gay Meadow; Attendance: 4,406; Referee: RA Banks (Manchester)

10 September 1983 5	Leeds United	1–0	Cardiff City	Leeds
15:00	George McCluskey 71'			Stadium: Elland Road; Attendance: 12,336; Referee: Joe Worrall (Warrington)

17 September 1983 6	Cardiff City	0–0	Portsmouth	Cardiff
15:00				Stadium: Ninian Park; Attendance: 9,033; Referee: Vic Callow (Solihull)

1 October 1983 7	Cardiff City	0–3	Barnsley	Cardiff
15:00			42' Ronnie Glavin; David Geddis; 81' Ronnie Glavin	Stadium: Ninian Park; Attendance: 6,433; Referee: Alan Crickmore (Plymouth)

8 October 1983 8	Cardiff City	2–0	Carlisle United	Cardiff
15:00	Nigel Vaughan 45'; Gordon Owen			Stadium: Ninian Park; Attendance: 4,596; Referee: Alan Seville (Birmingham)

15 October 1983 9	Chelsea	2–0	Cardiff City	London
15:00	Pat Nevin; Colin Lee			Stadium: Stamford Bridge; Attendance: 15,459; Referee: Mark Scott (Nottinghamshire)

19 October 1983 10	Cardiff City	0–2	Newcastle United	Cardiff
19:45			59' Kevin Keegan; 9' Peter Beardsley	Stadium: Ninian Park; Attendance: 9,926; Referee: Roger Milford (Bristol)

31 October 1983 11	Fulham	0–2	Cardiff City	London
19:30			62' Gary Bennett; 89' Gordon Owen	Stadium: Craven Cottage; Attendance: 5,959

5 November 1983 12	Middlesbrough	2–0	Cardiff City	Middlesbrough
15:00	David Currie 60'; Andy Crawford 62'			Stadium: Ayresome Park; Attendance: 7,686; Referee: Howe

8 November 1983 13	Crystal Palace	1–0	Cardiff City	London
19:30	Jerry Murphy 79'			Stadium: Selhurst Park; Attendance: 5,299; Referee: David Axcell (Southend)

12 November 1983 14	Cardiff City	5–0	Cambridge United	Cardiff
15:00	Roger Gibbins 25'; Nigel Vaughan 29'; Steve Fallon 33' (o.g.); Gordon Owen 86'; Roger Gibbins			Stadium: Ninian Park; Attendance: 4,720; Referee: Alan Robinson (Fareham)

19 November 1983 15	Oldham Athletic	2–1	Cardiff City	Oldham
15:00	Roger Palmer; Derrick Parker		49' Phil Dwyer	Stadium: Boundary Park; Attendance: 3,587

26 November 1983 16	Cardiff City	3–1	Huddersfield	Cardiff
15:00	Paul Bodin 52'; Brian Laws (o.g.); Gordon Owen		(pen.) Colin Russell	Stadium: Ninian Park; Attendance: 6,067

3 December 1983 17	Brighton & Hove Albion	3–1	Cardiff City	Brighton
15:00	Danny Wilson 43'; Terry Connor 62'; Danny Wilson		Ian Baird	Stadium: Goldstone Ground; Attendance: 9,924; Referee: Ken Salmon (Barnet)

10 December 1983 18	Cardiff City	0–1	Blackburn Rovers	Cardiff
15:00			53' Mark Patterson	Stadium: Ninian Park; Attendance: 5,200; Referee: Dennis Brazier (Northampton)

17 December 1983 19	Sheffield Wednesday	5–2	Cardiff City	Sheffield
15:00	Imre Varadi 30', 48'; Gary Shelton 33'; Gary Bannister 40'; Mick Lyons 59'		77', 81' Ian Baird	Stadium: Hillsborough; Attendance: 14,580

26 December 1983 20	Cardiff City	3–2	Swansea City	Cardiff
11:30	Roger Gibbins 24'; Nigel Vaughan 45'; Trevor Lee 51'		44' (pen.) Gary Stanley; 55' John Toshack	Stadium: Ninian Park; Attendance: 14,580; Referee: Eric Read (Bristol)

27 December 1983 21	Derby County	2–3	Cardiff City	Derby
15:00	John McAlle 2'; Paul Hooks 43'		38' Ian Baird; Ian Baird; 77' Phil Dwyer	Stadium: Baseball Ground; Attendance: 16,054; Referee: Plummer

31 December 1983 22	Grimsby Town	1–0	Cardiff City	Grimsby
15:00	Paul Emson 50'			Attendance: 7,164

21 January 1984 23	Portsmouth	1–1	Cardiff City	Portsmouth
15:00	Kevin Dillon 87' (pen.)		41' Trevor Lee	Stadium: Fratton Park; Attendance: 11,938

31 January 1984 24	Cardiff City	2–1	Charlton Athletic	Cardiff
19:30	Gordon Owen 50'; Gary Bennett 87'		78' Kevin Dickenson	Stadium: Ninian Park; Attendance: 4,522; Referee: Malcolm Heath (Stoke)

4 February 1984 25	Barnsley	2–3	Cardiff City	Barnsley
	Mick McGuire; David Geddis		70' Gordon Owen; 72' (o.g.) Larry May; 73' Ian Baird	Stadium: Oakwell; Attendance: 7,107

11 February 1984 26	Cardiff City	0–1	Leeds United	Cardiff
15:00			85' Scott Sellars	Stadium: Ninian Park; Attendance: 9,407; Referee: John Martin (Alton, Hampshire)

19 February 1984 27	Cardiff City	0–4	Fulham	Cardiff
15:00			41', 67' Dean Coney; 44', 70' Leroy Rosenior	Stadium: Ninian Park; Attendance: 7,149; Referee: Keren Barratt (Coventry)

25 February 1984 28	Newcastle United	3–1	Cardiff City	Newcastle
15:00	Chris Waddle 9'; Kevin Keegan 44', 57' (pen.)		58' Nigel Vaughan	Stadium: St James' Park; Attendance: 27,909; Referee: Alan Robinson (Fareham)

3 March 1984 29	Cardiff City	2–1	Middlesbrough	Cardiff
15:00	Karl Elsey (90s); Martin Goldsmith		Garry MacDonald	Stadium: Ninian Park; Attendance: 4,422; Referee: Leslie Burden (Dorset)

10 March 1984 30	Cambridge United	0–2	Cardiff City	Cambridge
15:00			51' Colin Smith; Nigel Vaughan	Stadium: Abbey Stadium; Attendance: 2,512; Referee: Mike Taylor (Deal)

17 March 1984 31	Cardiff City	2–0	Shrewsbury Town	Cardiff
12:30	Nigel Vaughan 30'; Gordon Owen 53'			Stadium: Ninian Park; Attendance: 3,870; Referee: EA Crickmore (Plymouth)

24 March 1984 32	Manchester City	2–1	Cardiff City	Manchester
15:00	David Johnson 83'; Graham Baker 90'		15' Gordon Owen	Stadium: Maine Road; Attendance: 20,140; Referee: Howard Taylor (Oadby, Leicestershire)

31 March 1984 33	Cardiff City	3–3	Chelsea	Cardiff
15:00	Roger Gibbins 81'; Gordon Owen 22' (pen.); Nigel Vaughan 25'		84' Kerry Dixon; 85' Colin Lee; 90' (pen.) Nigel Spackman	Stadium: Ninian Park; Attendance: 11,060; Referee: Bob Nixon (West Kirby)

7 April 1984 34	Carlisle United	1–1	Cardiff City	Carlisle
15:00	Malcolm Poskett 70'		82' Martin Goldsmith	Stadium: Brunton Park; Attendance: 4,704; Referee: NL Wilson

14 April 1984 35	Cardiff City	2–0	Oldham Athletic	Cardiff
15:00	Gordon Owen 44' (pen.); Trevor Lee			Stadium: Ninian Park; Attendance: 4,637; Referee: Colin Downey (Hounslow)

17 April 1984 36	Cardiff City	0–2	Crystal Palace	Cardiff
19:45			45' (o.g.) Colin Smith; 56' Stan Cummins	Stadium: Ninian Park; Attendance: 4,091; Referee: Maurice Robinson (Sutton Coldfield)

21 April 1984 37	Swansea City	3–2	Cardiff City	Swansea
15:00	Ian Walsh 73'; Dean Saunders 28', 85'		17' Colin Smith; 27' Gordon Owen	Stadium: Vetch Field; Attendance: 10,275; Referee: Brian Stevens (Stonehouse)

23 April 1984 38	Cardiff City	1–0	Derby County	Cardiff
15:00	Gordon Owen			Stadium: Ninian Park; Attendance: 5,056; Referee: Dennis Hedges (Oxford)

28 April 1984 39	Huddersfield	4–0	Cardiff City	Huddersfield
15:00	Paul Jones (pen.); Paul Jones (pen.); Paul Jones; Daral Pugh			Stadium: Leeds Road; Attendance: 5,599

5 May 1984 40	Cardiff City	2–2	Brighton & Hove Albion	Cardiff
15:00	Trevor Lee 6'; Nigel Vaughan 67'		Chris Hutchings; 68' Danny Wilson	Stadium: Ninian Park; Attendance: 4,366; Referee: Ken Baker (Rugby)

7 May 1984 41	Blackburn Rovers	1–1	Cardiff City	Blackburn
15:00	Mark Patterson		Trevor Lee	Stadium: Ewood Park; Attendance: 3,107

12 May 1984 42	Cardiff City	0–2	Sheffield Wednesday	Cardiff
15:00			46' Gary Bannister; 50' Tony Cunningham	Stadium: Ninian Park; Attendance: 14,171; Referee: Roger Milford (Bristol)

=== Milk Cup ===
31 August 1983 Round 1 (First Leg)	Exeter City	2–3	Cardiff City	Exeter
19:30	Tony Kellow 69'; Peter Rogers 77'		81' Phil Dwyer; 83' Gordon Owen; Andy Crawford	Stadium: St James Park; Attendance: 4,055; Referee: JE Bray

15 September 1983 Round 1 (Second Leg)	Cardiff City	2–1 (5–2 agg.)	Exeter City	Cardiff
19:30	Andy Crawford 67'; Gary Bennett 77'		65' Stan McEwan	Stadium: Ninian Park; Attendance: 2,721; Referee: Keren Barratt (Coventry)

4 October 1983 Round 2 (First Leg)	Cardiff City	0–0	Norwich City	Cardiff
19:45				Stadium: Ninian Park; Attendance: 4,425; Referee: Ken Baker (Rugby)

26 October 1983 Round 2 (Second Leg)	Norwich City	3–0 (3–0 agg.)	Cardiff City	Norwich
19:30	Mick Channon; Mick Channon; Mick Channon			Stadium: Carrow Road; Attendance: 11,632

=== FA Cup ===
7 January 1984 Round 3	Cardiff City	0–3	Ipswich Town	Cardiff
15:00			38' Eric Gates; 49' Eric Gates; Eric Gates	Stadium: Ninian Park; Attendance: 10,183; Referee: Tony Ward (London)

=== Welsh Cup ===
22 November 1983 Round 3	Cardiff City	5–0	Taff's Well	Cardiff
19:30	Wayne Matthews 4'; Gordon Owen 21'; Roger Gibbins 27'; Nigel Vaughan 82'; Chris Townsend 85'			Stadium: Ninian Park; Attendance: 894

18 January 1984 Round 4	Cardiff City	4–0	Maesteg Park	Cardiff
19:45	Gordon Owen (pen.); Gordon Owen (pen.); Ian Baird; Trevor Lee			Stadium: Ninian Park; Attendance: 905; Referee: DA Jones (Aberdare)

7 February 1984 Round 5	Cardiff City	1–3	Hereford United	Cardiff
19:45	Nigel Vaughan 25'		41'	Stadium: Ninian Park; Attendance: 2,033; Referee: Ffrangcon Roberts (Prestatyn)

== Bibliography ==
- Hayes, Dean (2006). The Who's Who of Cardiff City. Breedon Books. ISBN 1-85983-462-0.
- Crooks, John (1986). Cardiff City Chronology 1920-86. John Crooks. ISBN 0-9511984-0-8.
- Shepherd, Richard (2002). The Definitive Cardiff City F.C. Tony Brown. ISBN 1-899-46817-X.
- Crooks, John (1992). Cardiff City Football Club: Official History of the Bluebirds. Yore Publications. ISBN 0-9513321-8-X.
- "Football Club History Database – Cardiff City". Archived from the original on 30 December 2008.
- Welsh Football Data Archive
