= 2006–07 Torquay United F.C. season =

Torquay United
2006–07 season
- Chairman: Mike Bateson (until October 2006); Chris Roberts (from October 2006 to 21 February 2007); Keith Richardson (from 22 February 2007 to 7 March 2007); Mike Bateson (from 7 March 2007 to 14 May 2007); Mervyn Benney (14 May 2007 to 25 May 2007); Alex Rowe (from 24 May 2007)
- Manager: Ian Atkins (until 27 November 2007); Luboš Kubík (from 27 November 2006 to 5 February 2007); Keith Curle (from 8 February 2007 to 17 May 2007); Leroy Rosenior (17 May 2007); Paul Buckle (from 2 June 2007)
- League Two: 24th (relegated)
- FA Cup: Third Round
- League Cup: First Round
- Football League Trophy: First Round
- Top goalscorer: League: Jamie Ward (9); All: Jamie Ward (11)
- Highest home attendance: 5,396 v Southampton, 6 January 2007 (FA Cup)
- Lowest home attendance: 1,588 v Wrexham, 5 December 2006
Home colours

The 2006–07 season was Torquay United F.C.'s 73rd and final season in the Football League before being relegated to the Conference National. It covers the period from 1 July 2006 to 30 June 2007.

== Review and events ==
=== Chronological order of events ===
- 12 October: Chairman and owner Mike Bateson sells club to consortium led by Chris Roberts
- 21 November: Roberts introduces an anti-diving initiative whereby Torquay players will be cautioned or fined for diving or feigning injury and if a third offence occurs will be transfer-listed or sacked
- 27 November: Ian Atkins replaced as manager by former Czech international Luboš Kubík
- 10 January: Former manager Colin Lee brought in to assist Kubik
- 5 February: Manager Luboš Kubík resigns
- 5 February: Midfielder Matthew Hewlett forced to retire due to a back injury
- 6 February: Midfielder Darren Baxter and defender Nathan Simpson are released
- 7 February: Colin Lee appointed as Director of Football
- 8 February: Keith Curle appointed as Head Coach until the end of the season
- 16 February: Sheffield United midfielder Lloyd Kerry joins on a month's loan
- 21 February: Chris Roberts resigns as chairman after a protest by three long-serving directors who resigned over Roberts' handling of the club
- 23 February: Local hotel owner Keith Richardson is appointed as the club's new chairman
- 26 February: Loanees Kevin Miller, Rossi Jarvis and Matthew Halliday return to their parent clubs
- 27 February: Chairman Keith Richardson distances himself and the club from plans to build a new stadium
- 2 March: Lincoln City goalkeeper Simon Rayner and Sheffield United striker Dean Oliver join on one-month loan deals and Sheffield United defender Chris Robertson joins on non-contract terms
- 6 March: Winger Marvin Williams joins on loan from Millwall until the end of the season
- 7 March: Mike Bateson returns as chairman
- 20 March: Defender John Wheeldon told he will be released at the end of the season
- 21 March: Former Torquay striker David Graham rejoins the club on loan from Sheffield Wednesday until the end of the season
- 22 March: Plymouth Argyle striker Reuben Reid joins on loan until the end of the season
- 2 April: Loanees Alistair John, Dean Oliver and Simon Rayner extend their loan stays until the end of the season
- 12 April: Loanees Alistair John and Lloyd Kerry return to Charlton Athletic and Sheffield United respectively after suffering injuries
- 14 April: Torquay's relegation from the football league is confirmed after a 1–1 draw at home to Peterborough United. Bateson puts the club up for sale after the game
- 5 May: Torquay play their final game in the Football League, a goalless draw at home to Hereford United
- 14 May: Chairman Mike Bateson stands down as chairman and is replaced by Mervyn Benney, although Bateson remains as majority shareholder
- 14 May: Director of Football Colin Lee is made redundant
- 17 May: Former manager Leroy Rosenior takes over as manager from Keith Curle, but is effectively out of a job again ten minutes later when Bateson informs him that the club has been sold
- 24 May: Alex Rowe appointed chairman after new consortium buys club from Mike Bateson
- 25 May: Colin Lee appointed as club's new Chief Executive
- 2 June: Former Torquay midfielder Paul Buckle is appointed as the club's new manager
- 4 June: Canadian goalkeeper Simon Rayner is signed on a free transfer from Lincoln City having been on loan to Torquay the previous season
- 6 June: Goalkeeper Martin Rice is signed on a free transfer from Exeter City
- 13 June: Shaun North appointed to Torquay coaching staff
- 13 June: Midfielder Matthew Hockley agrees new one-year contract
- 20 June: Chris Robertson and Chris Hargreaves sign for Torquay on free transfers from Sheffield United and Oxford United respectively
- 21 June: Defender Kevin Nicholson joins Torquay after rejecting a new contract at Forest Green Rovers
- 22 June: Striker Lee Phillips is signed on a three contract from Exeter City, for a fee of £17,500
- 28 June: Striker Tim Sills joins from Hereford United on a two-year contract
- 28 June: Striker Lee Thorpe has his contract terminated by mutual consent and joins Brentford five days later

== Player statistics ==
Player	League Apps	League Goals	Cup Apps	Cup Goals	Total Apps	Total Goals
(England) Nathan Abbey	24	0	5	0	29	0
(England) Lee Andrews	46	0	6	0	52	0
(England) Stevland Angus	36	1	3	0	39	1
(England) Darren Baxter	1	0	0	0	1	0
(England) Stephen Cooke	13	1	0	0	13	1
(Wales) Kyle Critchell	7	0	3	0	10	0
(England) Ryan Dickson	9	1	0	0	9	1
(Wales) Jamal Easter	10	0	1	0	11	0
(Republic of Ireland) Mickey Evans	14	1	3	0	17	1
(England) Leo Fortune-West	5	0	1	0	6	0
(England) Darren Garner	8	1	2	0	10	1
(England) Dean Gordon	8	0	0	0	8	0
(Scotland) David Graham	7	0	0	0	7	0
(England) Matthew Halliday	3	0	0	0	3	0
(England) Leon Hapgood	1	0	0	0	1	0
(England) Matthew Hewlett	0	0	0	0	0	0
(England) Kevin Hill	36	1	6	0	42	1
(England) Matthew Hockley	37	0	4	0	41	0
(England) Martin Horsell	6	0	0	0	6	0
(England) Rossi Jarvis	4	0	0	0	4	0
(England) Alistair John	7	0	0	0	7	0
(England) Lloyd Kerry	7	1	0	0	7	1
(England) Kevin Miller	7	0	0	0	7	0
(England) Michael Leary	2	0	1	0	3	0
(England) Lee Mansell	45	4	6	0	51	4
(England) Nick McKoy	4	0	1	0	5	0
(England) Chris McPhee	37	0	6	1	43	1
(England) Carl Motteram	7	0	4	0	11	0
(England) Adam Murray	21	0	4	0	25	0
(Poland) Przemysław Norko	0	0	0	0	0	0
(England) Dean Oliver	1	0	0	0	1	0
(England) Martin Phillips	14	1	0	0	14	1
(Canada) Simon Rayner	10	0	0	0	10	0
(England) Stephen Reed	15	0	4	0	19	0
(England) Reuben Reid	7	2	0	0	7	2
(Scotland) Chris Robertson	9	1	0	0	9	1
(England) Jordan Robertson	9	2	2	2	11	4
(England) Mark Robinson	18	0	0	0	18	0
(England) Nathan Simpson	0	0	0	0	0	0
(England) Paul Smith	8	0	0	0	8	0
(England) Craig Taylor	13	1	0	0	13	1
(England) Lee Thorpe	41	8	6	0	47	8
(England) Matt Villis	6	0	2	0	6	2
(England) Jamie Ward	25	9	4	2	29	11
(England) Jonathan Wheeldon	0	0	0	0	0	0
(England) Marvin Williams	2	1	0	0	2	1
(England) Steve Woods	32	0	6	0	38	0
