= 1983–84 Chelsea F.C. season =

English football club season

Chelsea
1983–84 season
- Chairman: Ken Bates
- Manager: John Neal
- Stadium: Stamford Bridge
- Second Division: 1st
- FA Cup: Third round
- Milk Cup: Third round
- Top goalscorer: League: Kerry Dixon (28); All: Kerry Dixon (34)
- Highest home attendance: 35,147 vs Sheffield Wednesday (21 January 1984)
- Lowest home attendance: 9,704 vs Gillingham (13 September 1983)
- Average home league attendance: 21,127
- Biggest win: 6–1 v Swansea City (6 December 1983)
- Biggest defeat: 0–2 v Leicester City (25 October 1983)
Home colours	Away colours

The 1983–84 season was Chelsea Football Club's 70th competitive season. After five years in the Second Division, Chelsea won promotion to the First Division as champions, losing only four of their 42 league matches and pipping Sheffield Wednesday to the title on goal difference.

== Season summary ==
Manager John Neal revamped his squad after narrowly avoiding relegation to the Third Division the previous season. New signings included goalkeeper Eddie Niedzwiecki, centre-back Joe McLaughlin, midfielder Nigel Spackman, winger Pat Nevin, and striker Kerry Dixon.

Neal also added experience in the form of veteran utility player John Hollins, who rejoined the club on a free transfer from Arsenal. Hollins had made 473 league appearances for Chelsea between 1963 and 1975 before moving to Queens Park Rangers. He retired as a player at the end of the 1983-84 season but stayed on as a coach and eventually succeeded Neal as manager in 1985.

Chelsea opened the season with a resounding 5–0 home win over Derby County. Dixon scored twice and followed up with the winner in a midweek Milk Cup tie at Gillingham, both goals in victory at Brighton and four in the return leg against Gillingham. He continued to score prolifically, ending the season as the Second Division's leading scorer with 28 goals, 34 in all competitions.

By the end of November, Chelsea lay in 2nd place behind Sheffield Wednesday, having lost only one of their opening 17 league matches - 2–1 at Hillsborough. After losing twice at home in December and at Middlesbrough in the first match of the New Year, they closed out the season with a 17 match unbeaten run. This included a remarkable draw at Cardiff in which Chelsea scored three times in the last six minutes after trailing 3–0 at half-time. Promotion was sealed by a 5–0 win over Leeds at the end of April.

With two matches of the season remaining, Chelsea trailed Sheffield Wednesday by two points, albeit with a significantly better goal difference. When Wednesday were held to a goalless draw by Manchester City in their penultimate fixture, Chelsea took advantage by beating Barnsley 3–1 to move into pole position and clinched the title with a 1–0 win at Grimsby.

== Squad statistics ==
- Substitute appearances in parentheses.

Pos.	Name	League		League Cup		FA Cup		Total	
Pos.	Name	Apps	Goals	Apps	Goals	Apps	Goals	Apps	Goals
GK	(England) Steve Francis	0	0	0	0	0	0	0	0
GK	(Wales) Eddie Niedzwiecki	42	0	5	0	1	0	48	0
DF	(England) Micky Droy	0	0	0	0	0	0	0	0
DF	(England) Keith Dublin	1	0	0	0	0	0	1	0
DF	(England) John Hollins	29	1	5	0	1	0	34	1
DF	(England) Chris Hutchings	4	1	1	0	0	0	5	1
DF	(Wales) Joey Jones	34	1	4	0	1	0	39	1
DF	(Scotland) Joe McLaughlin	41	0	5	0	1	0	47	0
DF	(England) Colin Pates	42	0	5	0	1	0	48	0
MF	(England) John Bumstead	30(1)	7	4	0	0	0	34(1)	7
MF	(England) Alan Hudson	0	0	0	0	0	0	0	0
MF	(England) Dale Jasper	3	0	0	0	0	0	3	0
MF	(England) Keith Jones	0	0	0	0	0	0	0	0
MF	(England) Colin Lee	25(8)	3	4(1)	0	0	0	29(9)	3
MF	(Scotland) Tony McAndrew	13	4	0	0	1	0	14	4
MF	(England) Nigel Spackman	40	3	5	0	1	0	46	3
MF	(Wales) Mickey Thomas	17	4	0	0	0	0	17	4
FW	(England) Paul Canoville	17(3)	6	4	1	1	0	22(3)	7
FW	(England) Kerry Dixon	42	28	5	6	1	0	48	34
FW	(Scotland) Derek Johnstone	0(2)	0	0	0	0	0	0(2)	0
FW	(Scotland) Pat Nevin	38	14	3(1)	0	1	0	42(1)	14
FW	(England) Peter Rhoades-Brown	6	1	1	0	0	0	7	1
FW	(Scotland) Duncan Shearer	0	0	0	0	0	0	0	0
FW	(Scotland) David Speedie	32(5)	13	2(1)	0	1	0	35(6)	13
FW	(England) Clive Walker	6	3	2	1	0	0	8	4

== League table ==
Pos	Team	Pld	W	D	L	GF	GA	GD	Pts	Relegation
1	Chelsea (C, P)	42	25	13	4	90	40	+50	88	Promotion to the First Division
2	Sheffield Wednesday (P)	42	26	10	6	72	34	+38	88	Promotion to the First Division
3	Newcastle United (P)	42	24	8	10	85	53	+32	80	Promotion to the First Division
4	Manchester City	42	20	10	12	66	48	+18	70	
5	Grimsby Town	42	19	13	10	60	47	+13	70	

Rules for classification: 1) Points; 2) Goal difference; 3) Goals scored
(C) Champions; (P) Promoted

== Results ==
=== Second Division ===
27 August 1983 1	Chelsea	5–0	Derby County	London
	Spackman 4'; Walker 52'; Hutchings 54'; Dixon 63', 68'			Stadium: Stamford Bridge; Attendance: 17,388

3 September 1983 2	Brighton & Hove Albion	1–2	Chelsea	Hove
	Young 76'		Dixon 26' (pen.), 81'	Stadium: Goldstone Ground; Attendance: 20,874

7 September 1983 3	Blackburn Rovers	0–0	Chelsea	Blackburn
				Stadium: Ewood Park; Attendance: 5,873

10 September 1983 4	Chelsea	2–1	Cambridge United	London
	Bumstead 20'; Walker 76'		Goldsmith 2'	Stadium: Stamford Bridge; Attendance: 14,425

17 September 1983 5	Sheffield Wednesday	2–1	Chelsea	Sheffield
	Lyons 47'; Megson 84'		Walker 2'	Stadium: Hillsborough; Attendance: 20,596

24 September 1983 6	Chelsea	0–0	Middlesbrough	London
				Stadium: Stamford Bridge; Attendance: 15,822

1 October 1983 7	Huddersfield Town	2–3	Chelsea	Huddersfield
	Stanton 74'; Lillis 84'		Dixon 12', 50'; Canoville 56'	Stadium: Leeds Road; Attendance: 13,280

8 October 1983 8	Fulham	3–5	Chelsea	London
	Davies 17', 22', 76'		Dixon 9', 86'; Jones 45'; Nevin 49'; Lee 59'	Stadium: Craven Cottage; Attendance: 24,787

15 October 1983 9	Chelsea	2–0	Cardiff City	London
	Nevin 17'; Lee 63'			Stadium: Stamford Bridge; Attendance: 15,459

22 October 1983 10	Carlisle United	0–0	Chelsea	Carlisle
				Stadium: Brunton Park; Attendance: 6,774

29 October 1983 11	Chelsea	3–2	Charlton Athletic	London
	Speedie 24', 32'; Dixon 78'		Robinson 71'; Moore 75'	Stadium: Stamford Bridge; Attendance: 17,789

5 November 1983 12	Oldham Athletic	1–1	Chelsea	Oldham
	Palmer 64'		Bumstead 75'	Stadium: Boundary Park; Attendance: 5,807

12 November 1983 13	Chelsea	4–0	Newcastle United	London
	Spackman 8'; Rhoades-Brown 36'; Speedie 46', 67'			Stadium: Stamford Bridge; Attendance: 30,628

15 November 1983 14	Charlton Athletic	1–1	Chelsea	London
	Harris 52'		Nevin 62'	Stadium: The Valley; Attendance: 14,393

19 November 1983 15	Chelsea	2–2	Crystal Palace	London
	Hollins 37'; Speedie 63'		Locke 10'; Evans 24'	Stadium: Stamford Bridge; Attendance: 19,060

22 November 1983 16	Swansea City	1–3	Chelsea	Swansea
	Pascoe 33'		Bumstead 7'; Nevin 21'; Dixon 42'	Stadium: Vetch Field; Attendance: 7,848

26 November 1983 17	Leeds United	1–1	Chelsea	Leeds
	McCluskey 46'		Dixon 58'	Stadium: Elland Road; Attendance: 20,680

3 December 1983 18	Chelsea	0–1	Manchester City	London
			Tolmie 44'	Stadium: Stamford Bridge; Attendance: 29,142

6 December 1983 19	Chelsea	6–1	Swansea City	London
	Canoville 8', 40', 84'; Nevin 24'; Dixon 50'; Bumstead 81'		Walsh 57'	Stadium: Stamford Bridge; Attendance: 12,389

10 December 1983 20	Barnsley	0–0	Chelsea	Barnsley
				Stadium: Oakwell; Attendance: 10,300

17 December 1983 21	Chelsea	2–3	Grimsby Town	London
	Dixon 26' (pen.); Bumstead 60'		Waters 65'; Emson 75'; Ford 77'	Stadium: Stamford Bridge; Attendance: 13,151

26 December 1983 22	Shrewsbury Town	2–4	Chelsea	Shrewsbury
	Brown 44'; MacLaren 75'		Dixon 64' (pen.); Speedie 71'; Bumstead 81', 84'	Stadium: Gay Meadow; Attendance: 7,582

27 December 1983 23	Chelsea	2–2	Portsmouth	London
	Canoville 6'; Dixon 39'		Hateley 4'; Dillon 11' (pen.)	Stadium: Stamford Bridge; Attendance: 25,409

31 December 1983 24	Chelsea	1–0	Brighton & Hove Albion	London
	Speedie 77'			Stadium: Stamford Bridge; Attendance: 18,542

2 January 1984 25	Middlesbrough	2–1	Chelsea	Middlesbrough
	Hamilton 39'; Currie 87'		McAndrew 55'	Stadium: Ayresome Park; Attendance: 11,579

14 January 1984 26	Derby County	1–2	Chelsea	Derby
	Plummer 87'		Cherry 5' (o.g.); McAndrew 76' (pen.)	Stadium: Baseball Ground; Attendance: 16,727

21 January 1984 27	Chelsea	3–2	Sheffield Wednesday	London
	Thomas 16', 40'; Nevin 80'		Smith 82'; Bannister 85'	Stadium: Stamford Bridge; Attendance: 35,147

4 February 1984 28	Chelsea	3–1	Huddersfield Town	London
	Dixon 20', 44'; Speedie 62'		Doyle 55'	Stadium: Stamford Bridge; Attendance: 17,922

11 February 1984 29	Cambridge United	0–1	Chelsea	Cambridge
			McAndrew 6'	Stadium: Abbey Stadium; Attendance: 10,602

25 February 1984 30	Chelsea	0–0	Carlisle United	London
				Stadium: Stamford Bridge; Attendance: 16,543

3 March 1984 31	Chelsea	3–0	Oldham Athletic	London
	Speedie 19'; Dixon 71'; McAndrew 75' (pen.)			Stadium: Stamford Bridge; Attendance: 12,736

10 March 1984 32	Newcastle United	1–1	Chelsea	Newcastle upon Tyne
	McDermott 70'		Speedie 52'	Stadium: St James' Park; Attendance: 36,506

16 March 1984 33	Chelsea	2–1	Blackburn Rovers	London
	Nevin 39'; Speedie 45'		Garner 70'	Stadium: Stamford Bridge; Attendance: 18,905

31 March 1984 34	Cardiff City	3–3	Chelsea	Cardiff
	Gibbins 18'; Owen 22' (pen.); Vaughan 25'		Dixon 84'; Lee 85'; Spackman 90' (pen.)	Stadium: Ninian Park; Attendance: 11,060

7 April 1984 35	Chelsea	4–0	Fulham	London
	Dixon 1', 38'; Speedie 18'; Nevin 67'			Stadium: Stamford Bridge; Attendance: 31,947

14 April 1984 36	Crystal Palace	0–1	Chelsea	London
			Nevin 83'	Stadium: Selhurst Park; Attendance: 20,540

21 April 1984 37	Chelsea	3–0	Shrewsbury Town	London
	Dixon 6', 87'; Nevin 32'			Stadium: Stamford Bridge; Attendance: 17,295

24 April 1984 38	Portsmouth	2–2	Chelsea	Portsmouth
	Biley 62'; Dillon 71'		Thomas 5'; Nevin 56' (pen.)	Stadium: Fratton Park; Attendance: 19,267

28 April 1984 39	Chelsea	5–0	Leeds United	London
	Thomas 6'; Dixon 18', 23', 52'; Canoville 89'			Stadium: Stamford Bridge; Attendance: 33,447

4 May 1984 40	Manchester City	0–2	Chelsea	Manchester
			Nevin 65'; Dixon 70'	Stadium: Maine Road; Attendance: 21,713

7 May 1984 41	Chelsea	3–1	Barnsley	London
	Speedie 37'; Nevin 77', 89'		Geddis 60'	Stadium: Stamford Bridge; Attendance: 29,541

12 May 1984 42	Grimsby Town	0–1	Chelsea	Cleethorpes
			Dixon 41'	Stadium: Blundell Park; Attendance: 13,995

=== Milk Cup ===
30 August 1983 1st Round 1st Leg	Gillingham	1–2	Chelsea	Gillingham
	Shaw 14'		Walker 38'; Dixon 57'	Stadium: Priestfield; Attendance: 8,633

13 September 1983 1st Round 2nd Leg	Chelsea	4–0	Gillingham	London
	Dixon 40', 44', 54', 84'			Stadium: Stamford Bridge; Attendance: 9,704

5 October 1983 2nd Round 1st Leg	Leicester City	0–2	Chelsea	Leicester
			Dixon 23'; Canoville 44'	Stadium: Filbert Street; Attendance: 7,825

25 October 1983 2nd Round 2nd Leg	Chelsea	0–2 (a.e.t.) (4–3 p)	Leicester City	London
			A. Smith 26'; English 83'	Stadium: Stamford Bridge; Attendance: 15,646

9 November 1983 3rd Round	Chelsea	0–1	West Bromwich Albion	London
			Thompson 70'	Stadium: Stamford Bridge; Attendance: 22,932

=== FA Cup ===
7 January 1984 3rd Round	Blackburn Rovers	1–0	Chelsea	Blackburn
	Brotherston 3'			Stadium: Ewood Park; Attendance: 10,944
