= 1985–86 Chelsea F.C. season =

English football club season

Chelsea
1985-86 season
- Chairman: Ken Bates
- Manager: John Hollins
- Stadium: Stamford Bridge
- First Division: 6th
- FA Cup: Fourth round proper
- Football League Cup: Fifth round replay
- Top goalscorer: Dixon/Speedie (14)
Home colours	Away colours	Third colours

In the 1985-86 season Chelsea played in the First Division for the second successive season.

== Season summary ==
It was the first season under the management of John Hollins, who had previously been a member of Chelsea's victories in the 1970 FA Cup Final and 1971 European Cup Winners' Cup Final. On 1 January 1986 Chelsea were second, two points behind leaders Manchester United. On 22 March, they were four points behind leaders Everton with two games in hand. The two games in hand were lost 4–0 at home to West Ham United and 6–0 away at Queens Park Rangers. Away wins over Manchester United and West Ham left them third with five matches remaining, but they subsequently took only nine points from a possible 33 in the last 11 games, and finished 6th for the second season in succession.

On 23 March 1986 Chelsea won the 1986 Full Members Cup Final 5–4 at Wembley Stadium against Manchester City with David Speedie (the club's joint top scorer in the league along with Kerry Dixon on 14 goals) scoring Chelsea's only Wembley hat-trick. Colin Lee scored Chelsea's other two goals. Due to the widespread negativity over English football after the 1985 Heysel disaster, victorious manager Hollins was quoted as saying "If football is dying, I hope it's dying like that".

After an away win at Shrewsbury Town in the 3rd round of the FA Cup, Chelsea lost 2-1 at home to eventual Champions Liverpool in the fourth round.

In the 1985-86 Football League Cup Chelsea beat Mansfield Town in a two-legged second round but required replays to advance past Fulham and Everton in the subsequent rounds. After drawing 1–1 away to Queens Park Rangers Chelsea lost the fifth round replay 2-0 at Stamford Bridge.

== Table ==
Pos	Team	Pld	W	D	L	GF	GA	GD	Pts	Qualification or relegation
4	Manchester United	42	22	10	10	70	36	+34	76	Disqualified from the UEFA Cup
5	Sheffield Wednesday (Note: Since Everton would have instead qualified for the European Cup Winners' Cup, UEFA Cup qualification would have been passed down to Sheffield Wednesday.)	42	21	10	11	63	54	+9	73	Disqualified from the UEFA Cup
6	Chelsea	42	20	11	11	57	56	+1	71	
7	Arsenal	42	20	9	13	49	47	+2	69	
8	Nottingham Forest	42	19	11	12	69	53	+16	68	

Source: World Football
Rules for classification: 1) Points; 2) Goal difference; 3) Goals scored

== League scorers ==
- (England) Kerry Dixon 14
- (Scotland) David Speedie 14
- (Scotland) Pat Nevin 7
- (England) Nigel Spackman 7
- (England) Jerry Murphy 3
- (England) Keith Jones 2
- (Scotland) Doug Rougvie 2
- (England) John Bumstead 1
- (England) Paul Canoville 1
- (England) Micky Hazard 1
- (Scotland) Joe McLaughlin 1
- (England) Colin Pates 1
- (Scotland) Duncan Shearer 1
- Own goal 2

=== Other players ===
- (England) Steve Francis
- (England) Darren Wood
- (England) Colin Lee
- (England) Keith Dublin

== Kit ==
Chelsea's kit was produced by Le Coq Sportif for the final of five seasons (starting 1981–82). The home kit was only worn this season, and re-introduced blue socks in favour of white for the first time since 1967–68. The shirt had shadow-stripes, a popular 1980s style, and the only white was around the v-neck and sleeves. The kit was unsponsored, as it had been since the end of Chelsea's first-ever sponsorship, with Gulf Air in the 1983–84 season.

The away kit closely followed the design of the home, but in red with white trim. While the home kit had plain white socks, the red socks of the away kit featured four hoops: a white and blue on both the turnover and the leg. For a third kit, the white away kit from the 1984–85 season was retained. As well as a V-neck, it included red and blue horizontal pinstripes on the shirt and hoops of blue and red on the socks.
