= Paul Canoville =

English footballer

Personal information
- Full name: Paul Kenneth Canoville
- Date of birth: 4 March 1962 (age 64)
- Place of birth: Southall, England
- Height: 6 ft 0 in (1.83 m)
- Position: Winger

Senior career*
Years	Team	Apps	(Gls)
1979–1981	Hillingdon Borough	0	(0)
1981–1986	Chelsea	79	(11)
1986–1987	Reading	16	(4)
1988–1989	Enfield	12	(5)
1990–1991	Maidenhead United	17	(3)
1991–1992	Burnham	1	(0)
1992–1993	Northwood	10	(0)
1994	Egham Town	4	(0)
Total		128	(24)
- * Club domestic league appearances and goals

Paul Kenneth Canoville (born 4 March 1962) is an English former professional footballer who played as a winger.

Paul was the first black player to make an appearance for the Chelsea FC senior men's team, April 12th 1982 away at Crystal Palace, a period blighted by abuse that he received from opposition and Chelsea FC fans.

In 2008, in partnership with the Chelsea FC historian, Rick Glanville, Paul penned his autobiography; Black and Blue. A book that would go on to win Best Autobiography in the National Sporting Club's 2009 Book Awards, and Best Autobiography in the 2009 British Sports Book Awards.

Following battles with drug addiction and cancer, in May 2015, Paul set-up The Paul Canoville Foundation with the simple objective of working and speaking with children and young people so that they might learn from his mistakes.

Through this work, Canoville provides an account of his personal experiences to children, who engage with the biographical nature of the narrative.

Through his foundation, Paul connected with thousands of children.

== Playing career ==
Paul Canoville started out playing semi-professionally for Southern League side Hillingdon Borough, and, as he had nowhere to stay , he slept in an abandoned car. At Borough he was moved from centre-half to play on the wing, where his pace and skill was a far greater asset for the team. After two successful seasons at Hillingdon he had trials with Southampton and Chelsea.

Playing for Hillingdon Borough in 1981 he was signed by Chelsea FC with whom he would be a part of the team that won the second division title in the 1983/84 season.

In 1986, following a racist altercation with a team mate that ended up in violence at a training camp, Paul was sold to Reading FC for £60,000. A year later, whilst playing for Reading he suffered a serious knee injury that ended his professional career.

He would later have spells with non-league clubs Enfield, Maidenhead United, Northwood, and Egham Town.

=== Chelsea ===
Paul Canoville signed for John Neal's Chelsea in December 1981; he was paid £175 a week and Hillingdon Borough received a £5,000 fee. Though violence and discrimination were rife in British football at the time, Chelsea in particular had a reputation for racism. He made his debut, and became Chelsea's first Black player, against Crystal Palace at Selhurst Park on 12 April 1982, coming on as a late substitute for Clive Walker, who had scored the only goal of the game.

"...As I'm stretching and running, I hear loud individual voices through the noise: 'Sit down you black cunt!, 'You fucking wog – fuck off!' Over and over again. Lots of different people. I hardly dared look around. They were right behind me. I snatched a glimpse. They were all wearing blue shirts and scarves – Chelsea fans, my side's fans, faces screwed with pure hatred and anger, all directed at me... I felt physically sick. I was absolutely terrified..."

— Paul Canoville faced abuse from his own fans for the colour of his skin.

He ended the 1981–82 season with two late substitute appearances, replacing Peter Rhoades-Brown on the right-wing on both occasions. He enjoyed a run of six games at the start of the 1982–83 season before he was sidelined with a thigh injury. He scored his first goal for the club with a volley in a 1–1 draw with Fulham. With Chelsea facing relegation into the Third Division, Canoville was returned to the first team towards the end of the campaign and helped the club to secure enough points to avoid relegation. He gradually won over the majority of supporters to the point that his name was sung by Chelsea fans, though the racist abuse continued for years.

Scottish winger Pat Nevin was signed for the 1983–84 season. Though Nevin and Canoville were rivals for the same position, they became good friends off the pitch, and Nevin was the only Chelsea player to publicly defend Canoville from the racist abuse he received. Canoville had a good start to the season, and scored a hat-trick against Swansea City on 6 December. However the next month Neal signed left-footed winger Mickey Thomas, which reduced Canoville's first team opportunities. Chelsea won promotion to the First Division as champions of the Second Division, and Canoville scored seven goals in 25 appearances.

He was in excellent form in the first half of the 1984–85 campaign, but picked up an injury against Stoke City in December and started just how many further matches upon his recovery. He did though put in a memorable performance against Sheffield Wednesday in a League Cup fifth-round replay at Hillsborough on 30 January, he replaced Colin Lee at half-time with Wednesday 3–0 ahead and scored the first goal of the Chelsea comeback before putting the "Blues" 4–3 ahead, though Wednesday scored a last minute equaliser. After that game he met his father – who had settled in Sheffield – for the first time in 21 years. Chelsea ended the season in sixth place, and Canoville had scored four goals in 35 games.

New manager John Hollins brought in Jerry Murphy from Crystal Palace to play on the left-side of midfield; the signing particularly angered Canoville as Murphy had a significantly better contract. Jerry Murphy was signed on a free transfer from Crystal Palace. Murphy did not settle well in the first team, allowing Canoville a return to the starting line-up by September. However, he struggled with injuries and with numerous other midfielders all vying for places at Stamford Bridge he played just 19 games in the 1985–86season. He also became unsettled at the club after fighting a teammate who had racially abused him following a night of heavy drinking. At the end of the season he agreed a move to Brentford, but ended up at Reading after the latter club made a late bid for his services.

=== Reading ===
Canoville was sold to Second Division Reading in August 1986 for £60,000. He saw the move as a fresh start away from the racist abuse he had received at Chelsea, and he was more respected at Reading due to his experience in the First Division. However, he ruptured his cruciate ligament in a clash with Sunderland's Dave Swindlehurst at Roker Park on 21 October and was ruled out for the rest of the 1986–87 season. After ten months of recovery he was fit enough to be included in manager Ian Branfoot's first team plans for the 1987–88 season. He scored in a 3–0 win against Oldham Athletic at Elm Park but his knee caused him to leave the game after 65 minutes. He went on to feature a total of eight times that season, including in a League Cup win over former club Chelsea at Stamford Bridge, but was never able to fully regain match fitness. In November 1987 his knee gave way again and Canoville announced his retirement from professional football.

"...I hadn't set about arranging personal insurance until the day before the injury. Far too little, far too late. I was left with nothing to show for my professional football career, the victim of my own bad planning…"

=== Later career ===
He moved down to non-league football, making appearances for Enfield, Maidenhead United and Burnham. He also played 12 league and cup games for Northwood in the 1992–93 season. He later played for Egham Town despite suffering from drug addiction.

== Style of play ==
Paul Canoville had high pace, good crossing ability, and contributed goals from the left-wing.

== Personal life ==
Paul Kenneth Canoville was born to Udine Patricia "Patsy" Lake on 4 March 1962 at 10 Albert Road, Southall.

His mother emigrated to England from Anguilla and his father had come from the Commonwealth of Dominica. His mother raised him and his sister June alone, as his father had no interest in raising a family. As a teenager he played truant from school and having become involved in petty crime was sent to borstal where he would spend three months.

When his mother moved in with her boyfriend in Slough in 1979 Canoville slept rough and in hostels, and at one hostel was falsely accused of rape.

Romantic relationships were not easy for Paul, the impact of his strict upbringing saw him do everything to avoid confrontation, when things because stressed with a partner he would leave rather than deal with it. This left him with a lot of friends but no longevity in his relationships. .

He has fathered eleven children through ten different women. His children are: Natalie (born 1979 to Christine), Derry (born May 1982 to Maureen), Dwayne, Lorreen (born April 1985 to Marsha), Germelle (born April 1985 to Valerie Cyrus), Jahmal (born January 1991), Pierre (born 26 December 1986 to Maria), Udine (born January 1988 to Joyce), Nickel (born 23 February 1988 to Suzy), Paris (born 13 September 1992 to Tracey), Tye Paul (born 20 December 1995, also to Tracey), and Caysey (born 3 November 1995 to Sonia). He met most of the women through the London rave and acid house party scene. Tye, died in infancy in 1995 from a heart defect.

By 1989 he had begun taking crack cocaine, and within a few years he became an addict. He had built a good career as a DJ after retiring as a footballer, but sold his records and equipment to pay for crack. He spent most of 1996 in rehab. In 1996, he was diagnosed with non-Hodgkin lymphoma, an aggressive form of cancer which attacks the immune system. He underwent a course of chemotherapy for the illness and made a full recovery. In 1999, he moved to the Caribbean island of Saint Martin, but soon began taking crack on the island and returned to London. In 2004, he entered rehab for a second time, at which point his cancer returned; by March 2005 he was again free of drugs and his cancer was in remission.

After two years working as a driver for disabled children, he became a classroom assistant in November 2007. Canoville's memoir, Black And Blue, (co-written with Rick Glanvill) was published in March 2008. It won a number of awards include Best Autobiography in the National Sporting Club's 2009 Book Awards, and Best Autobiography in the 2009 British Sports Book Awards. In March 2015 Sky Sports aired a documentary film chronicling his life story entitled Black & Blue: The Paul Canoville Story. In July 2018 it was the subject of discussion on BBC Radio 4's A Good Read.

== Career statistics ==
Appearances and goals by club, season and competition
Club	Season	League			FA Cup		League Cup		Other		Total	
Club	Season	Division	Apps	Goals	Apps	Goals	Apps	Goals	Apps	Goals	Apps	Goals
Chelsea	1981–82	Second Division	3	0	0	0	0	0	—		3	0
Chelsea	1982–83	Second Division	19	3	0	0	2	0	—		21	3
Chelsea	1983–84	Second Division	20	6	1	0	4	1	—		25	7
Chelsea	1984–85	First Division	24	1	2	1	9	2	—		35	4
Chelsea	1985–86	First Division	13	1	2	0	3	0	1 (Note: Appearance(s) in Full Members' Cup)	0	19	1
Chelsea	Total		79	11	5	1	18	3	1	0	103	15
Reading	1986–87	Second Division	9	3	0	0	4	0	0	0	13	3
Reading	1987–88	Second Division	7	1	0	0	1	0	0	0	8	1
Reading	Total		16	4	0	0	5	0	0	0	21	4
Career total			95	15	5	1	23	3	1	0	124	19

== Honours ==
Chelsea

- Football League Second Division: 1983–84
