= List of Southend United F.C. managers =

This article lists managers of Southend United Football Club in chronological order.

- 1906–1910: Bob Jack
- 1910–1911: George Molyneux
- 1911–1912: O. M. Howard
- 1912–1919: Joe Bradshaw
- 1919–1920: Ned Liddle
- 1920–1921: Tom Mather
- 1921–1934: Ted Birnie
- 1934–1940: David Jack
- 1946–1956: Harry Warren
- 1956–1960: Eddie Perry
- 1960–1960: Frank Broome
- 1961–1965: Ted Fenton
- 1965–1967: Alvan Williams
- 1967–1969: Ernie Shepherd
- 1969–1970: Geoff Hudson
- 1970–1976: Arthur Rowley
- 1976–1983: Dave Smith
- 1983–1984: Peter Morris
- 1984–1986: Bobby Moore
- 1986–1987: David Webb
- 1987–1987: Dick Bate
- 1987–1988: Paul Clark
- 1988–1992: David Webb (2nd spell)
- 1992–1993: Colin Murphy
- 1993–1993: Barry Fry
- 1993–1995: Peter Taylor
- 1995–1995: Steve Thompson
- 1995–1997: Ronnie Whelan
- 1997–1999: Alvin Martin
- 1999–1999: Mick Gooding
- 1999–2000: Alan Little
- 2000–2000: Mick Gooding (2nd spell)
- 2000–2001: David Webb (3rd spell)
- 2001–2003: Rob Newman
- 2003–2003: Stewart Robson
- 2003–2003: Steve Wignall
- 2003–2003: David Webb (4th spell)
- 2003–2010: Steve Tilson
- 2010–2013: Paul Sturrock
- 2013–2018: Phil Brown
- 2018–2019: Chris Powell
- 2019-2019: Kevin Bond
- 2019–2020 Sol Campbell
- 2020–2021 Mark Molesley
- 2021–2021 Phil Brown (2nd spell)
- 2021–2026 Kevin Maher

- 2026-present Kieron Dyer
