= Matthew Halliday =

Matthew Halliday may refer to:

- Matthew Halliday (footballer), English footballer
- Matthew Halliday (racing driver), New Zealand racing driver
