= Martin Goldsmith =

Martin Goldsmith may refer to:

- Martin Goldsmith (screenwriter), American screenwriter and novelist
- Martin Goldsmith (radio host), American radio personality and author
- Martin Goldsmith (footballer), Welsh footballer
