= Canoville =

Canoville is a surname. Notable people with the surname include:

- Lee Canoville (born 1981), English professional footballer
- Paul Canoville (born 1962), English professional footballer
