= Wayne Matthews =

Wayne Matthews may refer to:

- Wayne Matthews (footballer) (born 1964), Welsh football midfielder
- Wayne Matthews (American football) (born 2002), American football linebacker

== See also ==
- Wayne Matthew (born 1958), Australian politician
