= Martin Horsell =

English footballer (born 1986)

Personal information
- Date of birth: 10 December 1986 (age 39)
- Place of birth: Paignton, England
- Position: Goalkeeper

Team information
- Current team: Bath City (goalkeeper coach)

Youth career
- 2004: Plymouth Argyle

Senior career*
Years	Team	Apps	(Gls)
2004–2006	Bristol Rovers	0	(0)
2006–2007	Torquay United	6	(0)
2007	Yate Town	33	(0)
2007	Salisbury City	9	(0)
2008	Dorchester Town	3	(0)
2008	Tiverton Town	25	(0)
2009	R.R.F.C. Montegnée	40	(0)
2010–2015	Weymouth	74	(0)
2015–2019	Hereford	83	(0)
2018	→ Cirencester Town (loan)	2	(0)
2019–2022	Swindon Supermarine	85	(0)
2022–2023	Yate Town	37	(0)
2025–2026	Bath City	2	(0)
- * Club domestic league appearances and goals as of 19:26, 30 January 2026 (UTC)

Martin Horsell (born 10 December 1986) is a former English professional footballer who played as a goalkeeper, who is currently goalkeeping coach for Bath City.

== Career ==
Horsell was spotted by a scout from Plymouth Argyle while playing for his school, the King Edward VI Community College in his hometown Totnes. He played for the Argyle Youth sides and while attending Plymouth College was selected for the British Colleges side.

He left Plymouth in 2004 when he moved to the Bristol Academy of Sport at Filton College. Soon after starting at the College he was selected to play for the Bristol Rovers under-18 side and in October 2004 was signed by Rovers manager Ian Atkins on non-contract terms as cover for Kevin Miller. He signed a professional contract with Rovers for the 2005–06 season, but failed to break into the first team.

In July 2006, after his release by Rovers, he signed for Torquay United, by now managed by Ian Atkins as back-up for Nathan Abbey.

With Abbey set to leave over a contract dispute, Horsell was given his league debut when he replaced Abbey as a substitute with seven minutes remaining of the home game with Milton Keynes Dons, despite Torquay trailing 0–2 at the time. Abbey subsequently signed a contract with Brentford

He made his full debut in the next game, a 1–0 defeat at home to fellow strugglers Macclesfield Town in which he was given the Man of the Match Award. However, after the signing of Kevin Miller on loan from Southampton, Horsell returned to being second choice goalkeeper. With Torquay relegated to the Conference National at the end of the season, Horsell was offered a new contract. However, with the signing of both Simon Rayner and Martin Rice, Horsell chose to seek a move back to league football.

He began the 2007–08 season with Yate Town, signing an initial one-month contract with Conference National side Salisbury City in late September 2007 after an injury to regular Salisbury keeper Jamie Bittner. On 29 January 2008 he signed for Conference South side Dorchester Town.

He was unattached when he joined Tiverton Town in March 2008. He then joined Belgian side R.R.F.C. Montegnée.

At the start of the 2010–11 season he was playing for Weymouth.

Horsell joined Hereford midway through the 2015–16 season, helping them to promotion. After three years with the club, Horsell left Hereford by mutual consent on 11 January 2019. He then joined Swindon Supermarine. He was sent off on his debut, against Frome Town, for handling the ball outside of his area.

In June 2022, Horsell returned to Yate Town.

Horsell signed for Bath City in January 2025, on a deal that saw him hired as the club's goalkeeping coach as well as providing playing cover. He made his debut off the bench in a 2-0 National League South victory against Tonbridge Angels at Twerton Park on 15 March 2025, playing outfield after City had used all of their outfield substitutes.
