= Nathan Abbey =

English footballer (born 1978)

Personal information
- Full name: Nathanael Abbey
- Date of birth: 11 July 1978 (age 48)
- Place of birth: Islington, England
- Height: 6 ft 1 in (1.85 m)
- Position: Goalkeeper

Youth career
- –1995: Luton Town

Senior career*
Years	Team	Apps	(Gls)
1995–2001	Luton Town	55	(0)
2001–2002	Chesterfield	46	(0)
2002–2003	Northampton Town	5	(0)
2003	Stevenage Borough	6	(0)
2003	St Albans City	1	(0)
2003	Hayes	1	(0)
2003–2004	Ipswich Town	0	(0)
2004	Burnley	0	(0)
2004–2006	Boston United	61	(0)
2005–2006	→ Leyton Orient (loan)	0	(0)
2006	Bristol City	1	(0)
2006	Torquay United	24	(0)
2006–2007	Brentford	16	(0)
2007–2009	Milton Keynes Dons	1	(0)
2009–2010	Rushden & Diamonds	10	(0)
2010	Kettering Town	29	(0)
2011–2013	Arlesey Town	56	(0)
2013–2014	St Neots Town	37	(0)
2014–2015	Dunstable Town	1	(0)
2015–2018	Arlesey Town	0	(0)
Total		350	(0)

Managerial career
- 2011–2013: Arlesey Town (player-assistant)
- 2013–2014: St Neots Town (player-assistant)
- 2015–2018: Arlesey Town (joint-coach)
- 2018–2019: Bedford Town (assistant)
- 2019: Bedford Town (joint-manager)
- 2019–2020: Bedford Town
- * Club domestic league appearances and goals

Nathanael "Nathan" Abbey (born 11 July 1978) is an English journeyman former professional footballer who played as a goalkeeper.

== Career ==
=== Luton Town ===
Nathanael Abbey was born on 11 July 1978 in Islington, London, and began his football career as a trainee with Luton Town, turning professional in August 1995. His first team debut came on 26 August 1997 in the League Cup first round second leg tie at home to Colchester United, a 1–1 draw taking the Hatters into the second round. Later that season he had a spell on loan to Football Conference side Woking. He had to wait until January 1999 for this next first team appearance for Luton, playing in the 3–0 defeat at home to Walsall in the Football League Trophy. His league debut came the following month, on 6 February, playing in the 2–1 win away to Burnley.

Abbey began the 1999–2000 season as Luton's first choice goalkeeper, previous first choice Kelvin Davis having been sold to Wimbledon to aid Luton's financial problems, and remained a regular throughout the season. In the summer of 2000, Luton manager Ricky Hill signed Mark Ovendale and chose him to start the season in place of him. However, Abbey soon regained his place in the side, though spent most of the season in and out of the side as first Lil Fuccillo and then Joe Kinnear took over as Luton manager.

=== Chesterfield ===
With Luton relegated to the bottom flight of the Football League, Abbey was released by Luton and joined Chesterfield in August 2001. He was an ever-present the following season and won the Chesterfield Player of the Year Award, but left after failing to agree a new contract.

=== Non-league ===
He joined Northampton Town in August 2002 and signed a contract extension until the end of the season, but struggled to establish himself and was released at the end of the season having played only eight games. He returned to Luton on trial, but signed for Conference side Stevenage Borough in July 2003. He played six Conference games before returning to Luton Town in October 2003. He was released by Luton manager Mike Newell the following month, joining Macclesfield Town, where he again failed to make the first team and was released, joining non-league Hayes in December 2003. Abbey had similar experiences on moving to Ipswich Town later the same month and Burnley in January 2004.

=== Boston United ===
In July 2004, Abbey signed for Boston United, playing 61 league games over the next season and a half. He had a spell on loan with Leyton Orient in December 2005 and moved to Bristol City on a free transfer in February 2006 after being released by Boston at the end of January. He made just one appearance for City, as a substitute for Adriano Basso in the 1–0 defeat away to Southend United on 6 May 2005, before being released at the end of the season.

=== Torquay United ===
He signed for Torquay United in July 2006 and was soon installed as first choice goalkeeper by Torquay manager Ian Atkins. Despite being ever-present in the Torquay goal from the start of the 2006–07 season, Abbey was only offered a one-month extension to his existing six-month contract and left the club at the end of his contract on 28 December 2006. His last game for Torquay came on 26 December 2006 at home to Milton Keynes Dons, where Torquay manager Lubos Kubik decided to substitute him for debutant keeper Martin Horsell with seven minutes of the game remaining and Torquay 2–0 down.

=== Brentford ===
Abbey signed for Brentford on 29 December 2006 on an emergency loan as regular goalkeepers Stuart Nelson and Clark Masters were injured. He signed a permanent contract on 26 January 2007. He made sixteen appearances for the Bees before being released on 16 May 2007.

=== Milton Keynes Dons ===
He signed for Milton Keynes Dons shortly before the start of the 2007–08 season. He made his debut for MK Dons coming on as a sub against Cheltenham Town when regular keeper Willy Gueret was sent off. After two seasons he was released by MK Dons.

=== Return to non-league ===
He joined Rushden & Diamonds making eleven appearances for the club. In January 2010 he joined Kettering Town on a non-contract basis. It was announced on 16 November 2010 that Abbey had been sacked from Kettering Town due to gross misconduct, having made 29 appearances for the club.

== Managerial career ==
Abbey joined his brother Zema as player/assistant manager at Arlesey Town. In November 2013, Abbey moved with his brother to St Neots Town. Abbey left the club at the same time as his brother a couple of months into the 2014–15 season, with Gary King assuming sole control of the first team. Abbey soon joined Dunstable Town in late 2014. In February 2015, he returned to Arlesey Town as player-joint manager alongside his brother. The two left the club in May 2018.

In the summer 2018, Abbey joined Bedford Town both as a player and as an assistant coach, monitoring the match analysis. Ahead of the 2019–20 season, Abbey was promoted to joint-head coach alongside Jon Taylor. On 3 November 2019, Taylor decided to step back and Abbey agreed to take on the role by himself. However, he decided to step back on 14 January 2020 after a disappointing run of form since he took charge of the team.

In December 2021 it was announced that Bedford FC had been sold to new owner Peter McCormack. The club team, now known as Real Bedford, is currently managed by Nathan Abbey as it continues its season in the Spartan South Midlands Football League.

== Personal life ==
His brother, Zema, was also a professional footballer.

== Career statistics ==
As of 18 November 2018

Club	Season	League			FA Cup		League Cup		Other		Total	
Club	Season	Division	Apps	Goals	Apps	Goals	Apps	Goals	Apps	Goals	Apps	Goals
Luton Town	1997–98	Second Division	0	0	0	0	1	0	0	0	1	0
Luton Town	1998–99	Second Division	2	0	0	0	0	0	1	0	3	0
Luton Town	1999–00	Second Division	34	0	5	0	2	0	0	0	41	0
Luton Town	2000–01	Second Division	20	0	3	0	0	0	0	0	23	0
Luton Town	Total		56	0	8	0	3	0	1	0	68	0
Chesterfield	2001–02	Second Division	46	0	3	0	1	0	3	0	53	0
Northampton Town	2002–03	Second Division	5	0	0	0	1	0	2	0	8	0
Stevenage Borough	2003–04	Conference	6	0	0	0	0	0	—		6	0
Ipswich Town	2003–04	First Division	0	0	0	0	0	0	—		0	0
Burnley	2003–04	First Division	0	0	0	0	0	0	—		0	0
Boston United	2004–05	League Two	44	0	4	0	2	0	1	0	51	0
Boston United	2005–06	League Two	17	0	2	0	1	0	2	0	22	0
Boston United	Total		61	0	6	0	3	0	3	0	73	0
Leyton Orient (loan)	2005–06	League Two	0	0	—		—		—		0	0
Bristol City (loan)	2005–06	League One	1	0	—		—		—		1	0
Torquay United	2006–07	League Two	24	0	3	0	1	0	1	0	29	0
Brentford	2006–07	League One	16	0	—		—		—		16	0
Milton Keynes Dons	2007–08	League Two	0	0	1	0	2	0	0	0	3	0
Milton Keynes Dons	2008–09	League One	1	0	0	0	0	0	1	0	2	0
Milton Keynes Dons	Total		1	0	1	0	2	0	1	0	5	0
Rushden & Diamonds	2009–10	Conference Premier	10	0	2	0	—		—		12	0
Kettering Town	2009–10	Conference Premier	17	0	—		—		—		17	0
Kettering Town	2010–11	Conference Premier	11	0	0	0	—		—		11	0
Kettering Town	Total		28	0	0	0	—		—		28	0
Career total			254	0	23	0	11	0	11	0	299	0

== Honours ==
Milton Keynes Dons

- Football League Trophy: 2008
