= Chris Roberts (chairman) =

English businessman

Chris Roberts is an English businessman, who served as chairman of Torquay United Football Club between October 2006 and February 2007.

== Torquay United chairmanship ==
Chris Roberts and three other directors set up Torquay United Holdings Ltd to buy shares in October 2006 from Torquay United Football Club owner Mike Bateson over a four-year deal. Bateston still "owned" the club by retaining a 51 per cent share, while 34% of the club's shares were sold to the consortium.

His past career is heavily based in football having played in the Czech Republic when young, and performed various roles in the sport, such as being an advisor to FIFA and UEFA and being involved in the deal that brought Mark Viduka to Celtic. As a former FIFA Players Agent, Roberts worked closely with several clubs as he was experienced with the Overseas Labour Service and acquired many work permits for non-EEA Players.

In November 2006, Roberts introduced a new initiative whereby Torquay players would be disciplined and potentially dismissed if they dived and constantly brought the Club's reputation into disrepute, by repeatedly trying to fool referees by diving.

This did not prove very popular in the UK as the Players Union felt sidelined, but the idea gained a lot of support from the US Major League Soccer. UEFA also supported the move in principle. This may have sowed the seeds for UEFA's recent decision to hold players to account for diving, post match to the annoyance of Arsène Wenger, following Arsenal's game with Celtic in the Champions League in 2009.

On 27 November 2006 Roberts appointed his friend from the Czech Republic, Lubos Kubik, as manager and Bateson's son-in-law, Richard Hancox as his assistant. Former manager Ian Atkins was offered the post of Director of Football, but decided against staying with the new regime.

On 4 January 2007 the Torquay United Supporters Trust released a press statement proposing a vote of no confidence in Roberts as chairman of the football club, two days before their first planned meeting with the new board, which was cancelled.

On 6 February 2007, Roberts probably made his best decision by appointing fan's favourite Colin Lee as the new director of football. Lee signed a three-year deal and said "Over the next 3 years I intend to implement a new blue print for the football department of Torquay United to put us on a par with comparable sized clubs higher up the Football League ladder." Lee followed this by appointing former player Keith Curle as the new head coach.

Along with the appointment of Colin Lee, Roberts did make some positive changes, including the creation of the 'Educational Soccer Development Programme' in conjunction with Paignton Community Sports College, which brought youth team football back to Plainmoor.

He also appointed Sally Eagling as Marketing Manager. Sally continued until the end of the 2008-09 season, and helped the new local consortium which eventually bought the Club from Mike Bateson.

The Club struggled at the bottom of the league, the gate receipts for 15 consecutive home games, were down by 1,000 supporters a match, this reduced income by approximately £150,000 over a 3-month period, the Consortium were unable to raise the additional funds to maintain the Club, Roberts took the only decision possible and handed the Club back to Bateson and resigned as chairman on 14 February 2007.

Ironically Roberts always maintained that Torquay United need to develop a new Stadium, otherwise they would struggle to compete financially, however he never had the opportunity to implement his long term plans.
