= Przemysław Norko =

Polish footballer

Personal information
- Full name: Przemysław Norko
- Date of birth: 29 March 1979 (age 47)
- Place of birth: Szczecin, Poland
- Height: 1.88 m (6 ft 2 in)
- Position: Goalkeeper

Senior career*
Years	Team	Apps	(Gls)
1995–1997	Chemik Police		
1997–1998	Zagłębie Lubin	10	(0)
1998–1999	Odra Szczecin		
1999–2000	Polar Wrocław		
2000–2001	Górnik Polkowice		
2001–2002	Zagłębie Lubin	0	(0)
2002–2003	Pogoń Szczecin	9	(0)
2003–2004	Ruch Wysokie Mazowieckie		
2004–2005	Akratitos	0	(0)
2005–2006	Partizani Tirana	16	(0)
2006–2007	Ruch Chorzów	0	(0)
2007	Torquay United	0	(0)
2007	Kania Gostyń		
2008	Pogoń Szczecin		
2008–2010	Arkonia Szczecin		
2012	Zawisza Bydgoszcz	0	(0)
- * Club domestic league appearances and goals

Przemysław Norko (born 29 March 1979) is a Polish former professional footballer who played as a goalkeeper. He played for Poland at under-21 level. He was most recently the goalkeeping coach of Świt Szczecin.

Norko was born in Szczecin and began his career in his native Poland with Chemik Police before joining Zagłębie Lubin. He made his 1st Division debut on 23 August 1997, coming on as a substitute in a 3-1 defeat away to Widzew Łódź. He played six more times before being sent off in the 4-1 win away to Pogoń Szczecin on 25 October 1997. he played just once more that season, appearing in the 2-0 defeat away to Legia Warsaw on 9 June 1998. He played twice the following season, in the August games against ŁKS Łódź and Górnik Zabrze before leaving to join Odra Szczecin.

He subsequently played for Polar Wrocław and Górnik Polkowice before returning to Zagłębie in 2001. However, he played just once, in a 3-0 cup defeat away to Górnik Łęczna on 10 October 2001.

In 2002, he moved to Pogoń Szczecin, playing nine league games and once in the cup before leaving to join Ruch Wysokie Mazowieckie. He then moved to Greek 2nd Division side Akratitos in 2004. In 2005, he moved to Albanian side Partizani Tirana, before returning to Poland with Ruch Chorzów. However, he was unable to play for Chorzow due to a lack of international clearance from the Albanian Football Association.

In January 2007 he joined Torquay United, initially on a one-month contract, the first of a number of cheap foreign imports promised by new Torquay chairman Chris Roberts. However, a delay with his international clearance prevented him making his debut in the FA Cup against Southampton. There was later a problem with his medical and the contract was cancelled.

He returned to Poland to play for Kania Gostyń, joining Pogoń Szczecin in March 2008. He subsequently joined Arkonia Szczecin.

== External Source ==
- Przemysław Norko at 90minut.pl (in Polish)
