= Paul Evans (footballer, born 1964) =

English footballer

Personal information
- Full name: Paul Alan Evans
- Date of birth: 14 September 1964 (age 62)
- Place of birth: Brentwood, England
- Position: Forward

Senior career*
Years	Team	Apps	(Gls)
1982–1984	Cardiff City	2	(0)
- Brecon Corries
1987–1988	Newport County	10	(2)
- * Club domestic league appearances and goals

Paul Alan Evans (born 14 September 1964) is an English former professional footballer who played as a forward.

== Career ==
Evans began his career with Cardiff City, making his professional debut as a substitute in place of Wayne Matthews during a 1–0 defeat to Blackburn Rovers in December 1983. However, he made just one further appearance for the club before being released. He later returned to the Football League with Newport County in 1987.
