= Chris Townsend (footballer) =

Welsh footballer

Personal information
- Full name: Christopher Gordon Townsend
- Date of birth: 30 March 1966 (age 60)
- Place of birth: Abertillery, Wales
- Position: Forward

Senior career*
Years	Team	Apps	(Gls)
1983–1984	Cardiff City	5	(0)
1984–1985	Forest Green Rovers	?	(?)
1985–1988	Cheltenham Town	89	(39)
1988	Yeovil Town	3	(0)
1988–1990	Gloucester City	70	(57)
1990–1991	Dorchester Town	?	(?)
1991	Bath City	15	(4)
1991	Stroud	?	(?)
1991–1992	Gloucester City	21	(9)
1992–1993	Chesham United	?	(24)
1993–1994	Newport County	?	(18)
1994	Inter Cardiff	6	(1)
1994–1995	Ton Pentre	6	(1)
1994–1995	Barry Town	4	(0)
- * Club domestic league appearances and goals

Christopher Gordon Townsend (born 30 March 1966 in Abertillery) is a Welsh former professional footballer who played in the Football League, as a forward.
