= Alvan Williams =

Welsh footballer and manager

Personal information
- Full name: Alvan Williams
- Date of birth: 21 November 1932
- Place of birth: Beaumaris, Wales
- Date of death: 22 December 2003 (aged 71)
- Place of death: Bala, Wales
- Position: Centre forward

Senior career*
Years	Team	Apps	(Gls)
1955–1956	Bury	2	(1)
1956–1957	Wrexham	13	(7)
1957–1960	Bradford Park Avenue	92	(21)
1960–1961	Exeter City	19	(1)

Managerial career
- 1964–1965: Hartlepools United
- 1965–1967: Southend United
- 1967–1968: Wrexham
- * Club domestic league appearances and goals

Alvan Williams (21 November 1932 – 22 December 2003) was a Welsh former professional footballer and manager. During his career, he made over 100 appearances in The Football League, later going on to manage Hartlepools United, Southend United and Wrexham.

== Playing career ==
Alvan Williams began his career with Bury, making two league appearances for the club before moving to Division Three North side Wrexham in 1956. He made his debut for the Robins in a Cross-border derby match with Chester City on 18 August 1956 but went on to appear just 15 more times in all competitions before leaving. After spending three years with Bradford Park Avenue, injury forced him to retire in 1961 at the age of 28, while playing for Exeter City.He played part time for Bangor City and won the Welsh Cup in 1961/2, and played in the 1st round of the European Cup against Napoli, the team was beaten.

== Managerial career ==
After a spell as assistant manager at Bangor City, Williams was appointed manager of Division Four side Hartlepool United in February 1964. He remained with the club until May 1965. He nearly returned to the club in 1966 but, after failing to agree terms, the club instead handed Brian Clough his first job as manager.

In June 1965 he became manager of Southend United and would later break the club's transfer record by signing Eddie Firmani from Charlton Athletic for £10,000. However, he later became the first manager in the club's history to suffer relegation in the Football League after finishing 21st in the Third Division and Firmani returned to Charlton two years later for just £2,000. Known as a tough manager, Williams once refused to allow Defender Eddie May to come off after suffering a broken nose during a match in October 1966. May was walking off the pitch when Williams ordered him to turn around and continue playing for the final 33 minutes of the match. The club's physio instead strapped a sponge onto his nose in a bid to protect it from further damage and May returned to the game. Williams later stated in an interview: No one in my team is going to go off with a broken nose. He left the shrimpers in 1967.

Brought in as a replacement for Jack Rowley, Williams took several of his Southend staff with him to the Racecourse Ground including first-team coach John Neal and players Steve Ingle, Ray Smith and Eddie May who was appointed as his Captain at the North Wales club. Williams was often known as a no nonsense manager and, already incensed following a tackle on Terry Oldfield that had resulted in a broken leg, once threw his team's runners-up medals from the 1967 Welsh Cup Final away after losing a two-legged final to Cardiff City. During his time with the club, he was instrumental in setting up youth facilities at the club that lead to several players progressing through the club's ranks during the 1970s. However, he was forced to resign as Wrexham manager after falling out with the club's board.

== After football ==
After retiring from football he ran a number of pubs and clubs from Blackpool to London. In the 1970s he was involved in an unsavoury incident in his London bar which led to a student's death. He was initially charged with murder, and his trial went to the Old Bailey. However, due to lack of evidence the charge was reduced to affray, and he was released on bail. Later, Williams ran the Ship Inn in Bala with wife Elizabeth, and other pubs in the north Wales area. Williams will also be well known for his ability to spot young talented footballers. The Football Association of Wales awarded him a special merit award for his contribution to the game shortly before his death in December 2003.

=== Managerial statistics ===
Team	Country	From	To	Record				
Team	Country	From	To	G	W	D	L	Win %
Hartlepools United	(England)	February 1964	May 1965	68	21	18	29	30.88
Southend United	(England)	June 1965	March 1967	93	39	13	41	41.94
Wrexham	(Wales)	April 1967	September 1968	64	26	19	19	40.63
Total				225	86	50	89	38.22
