= Colin Smith (English footballer, born 1958) =

English footballer

Personal information
- Full name: Colin Richard Smith
- Date of birth: 3 November 1958 (age 67)
- Place of birth: Ruddington, England
- Height: 6 ft 0 in (1.83 m)
- Position: Defender

Senior career*
Years	Team	Apps	(Gls)
1976–1982	Nottingham Forest	0	(0)
1982	Caroline Hill		
1982	Norwich City	4	(0)
1982–1983	Sea Bee SA		
1983–1985	Cardiff City	50	(3)
1985–1990	Aldershot	190	(6)
- Wokingham Town
Total		244	(7)
- * Club domestic league appearances and goals

Colin Richard Smith (born 3 November 1958) is an English former footballer who played in the Football League as a defender for Nottingham Forest, Norwich City, Cardiff City and Aldershot, in non-league football for Wokingham Town, and in Hong Kong for Sea Bee.

== Honours ==
Aldershot

- Football League Fourth Division play-offs: 1987
