= Alistair John =

English footballer

Personal information
- Date of birth: 28 November 1987 (age 38)
- Place of birth: Croydon, Surrey, England
- Position: Winger

Youth career
- West Ham United
- Arsenal
- Charlton Athletic

Senior career*
| Years | Team | Apps | (Gls) |
| 2006–2007 | Charlton Athletic | 0 | (0) |
| 2006–2007 | → Brighton & Hove Albion (loan) | 4 | (0) |
| 2007 | → Torquay United (loan) | 7 | (0) |
| 2007–2008 | Stevenage Borough | 4 | (0) |
| 2010–2011 | Chessington & Hook United | 11 | (0) |
- * Club domestic league appearances and goals as of 19 July 2009 (UTC)

Alistair John (born 28 November 1987) is a professional footballer who plays as a midfielder or forward. His most recent club was the Combined Counties League team Chessington & Hook United.

== Career ==
Born in Croydon, John attended Coulsdon High School before joining Charlton Athletic as a trainee, turning professional in June 2006.

On 23 November 2006, John signed for League One side Brighton & Hove Albion on loan. He made his debut, as a substitute for Tommy Fraser, in a 1–0 defeat away to Doncaster Rovers two days later, making five further appearances before returning to Charlton at the beginning of January 2007.

John joined Torquay United on loan in February 2007, making his Gulls debut in a 1–0 defeat at home to Darlington on 25 February 2007. John played seven times for Torquay before returning to Charlton in April 2007 after suffering a hamstring problem. He was released by Charlton in June 2007.

On 30 August 2007, John signed for Stevenage Borough. On 18 September, he was stabbed outside his London home, but he did not suffer any life-threatening injuries. He chose to leave Stevenage at the end of the 2007–2008 season when new manager, Graham Westley, was installed as manager.
