= John Neal (footballer, born 1932) =

English footballer and manager

Personal information
- Date of birth: 13 April 1932
- Place of birth: Seaham, County Durham, England
- Date of death: 23 November 2014 (aged 82)
- Position: Defender

Senior career*
Years	Team	Apps	(Gls)
1949–1955	Hull City	60	(1)
1956–1957	King's Lynn		
1957–1958	Swindon Town	91	(2)
1959–1962	Aston Villa	96	(0)
1962–1965	Southend United	100	(1)
Total		256	(2)

Managerial career
- 1968–1977: Wrexham
- 1977–1981: Middlesbrough
- 1981–1985: Chelsea
- * Club domestic league appearances and goals

John Neal (13 April 1932 – 23 November 2014) was an English football player and manager.

== Playing career ==
Neal was a hard tackling full back who had seven seasons with Hull City, but seemed lost to the Football League when he joined King's Lynn in 1956.

Swindon Town brought him back to the Football League and he missed only one game in two seasons with the Robins. His career peaked when he signed for Aston Villa in 1959, with whom he won the Football League Second Division championship and promotion to the Football League First Division. He won the inaugural Football League Cup a year later. He joined Southend United in November 1962.

== Managerial career ==
=== Wrexham ===
Neal was appointed manager of Wrexham in 1968, succeeding Alvan Williams who had brought Neal to the club as his assistant. He took Wrexham to 9th in Division 4 in 1969, and to 2nd in Division 4 in 1970 and promotion to the Third Division. With Welsh clubs now able to qualify for the European Cup Winners Cup by winning the Welsh Cup, and following Wrexham winning the Welsh Cup, Neal in 1972 took Wrexham to the second round of the European Cup Winners Cup, where Wrexham held the Yugoslavian side Hajduk Split 3-3, but lost on the away goals rule.

Two years later, Neal took Wrexham to the quarter-finals of the FA Cup. Wrexham defeated Shrewsbury Town, Rotherham United, Middlesbrough, Crystal Palace and Southampton before losing in the quarter finals to First Division Burnley at Turf Moor.

In 1976, Neal took Wrexham on another run in the European Cup Winners Cup. They lost narrowly 2–1 in the quarter finals to the eventual winners RSC Anderlecht.

In the 1976–77 season, Wrexham defeated First Division Tottenham Hotspur in the League Cup, and First Division Sunderland in the FA Cup.

=== Middlesbrough ===
Neal succeeded Jack Charlton as manager of Middlesbrough in 1977. He left the club four years later.

=== Chelsea ===
Neal was appointed manager of Chelsea in 1981 as a successor to Geoff Hurst. The club narrowly avoided relegation to the Third Division of the Football League during 1982–83 for the first time ever, but over the summer Neal signed Kerry Dixon from Reading, Pat Nevin from Clyde, Eddie Niedzwiecki from Wrexham Joe McLaughlin from Greenock Morton and Nigel Spackman from Bournemouth. The previous season Neal had brought in Joey Jones and David Speedie and then added Mickey Thomas in January 1984. This side won the Second Division championship in 1983–84, losing just four league games and securing their place in the top-flight for the first time since 1979.

Upon returning to the top tier, Chelsea finished 6th in the First Division and reached the League Cup semi-finals. Neal retired at the end of the 1984–85 season due to ill-health and underwent heart surgery in 1986. After retirement as Chelsea manager in June 1985 he was appointed to the Chelsea Board of Directors.

On 23 November 2014, Neal died at the age of 82.

== Managerial statistics ==
Team	Nat	From	To	Record				
Team	Nat	From	To	G	W	D	L	Win %
Wrexham	(Wales)	1 September 1968	19 May 1977	474	199	125	150	41.98
Middlesbrough	(England)	1 May 1977	31 May 1981	196	69	52	75	35.20
Chelsea	(England)	1 May 1981	11 June 1985	204	84	61	59	41.18
Total				874	352	238	284	40.27

== Honours ==
Aston Villa

- Football League Cup: 1960–61
