= Andy Crawford (footballer, born 1959) =

English footballer

Personal information
- Full name: Andrew Crawford
- Date of birth: 30 January 1959 (age 67)
- Place of birth: Filey, England
- Height: 5 ft 7 in (1.70 m)
- Position: Forward

Senior career*
Years	Team	Apps	(Gls)
1977–1979	Derby County	21	(4)
1979–1981	Blackburn Rovers	56	(21)
1981–1983	AFC Bournemouth	33	(10)
1983	Cardiff City	6	(1)
1983	Scarborough	1	(0)
1983–1984	Middlesbrough	9	(1)
1984–1985	Stockport County	6	(2)
1985	Torquay United	3	(0)
- * Club domestic league appearances and goals

Andrew Crawford (born 30 January 1959) is an English former professional footballer who played as a forward.

== Career ==
Crawford began his career as a youth player with Derby County, making his professional debut on 8 March 1978 in a 4–2 victory over Liverpool in the First Division where he scores his side's first goal. The following year, he was sold to Blackburn Rovers for £50,000, scoring 23 goals in all competitions for the club in his first season as he helped them win promotion to the Second Division. However, Crawford pushed for a transfer following his breakout season but, when no club made an official approach, he went on strike and spent the majority of the 1980—81 season playing in the club's reserve side.

He eventually signed for AFC Bournemouth, who were managed by Crawford's former Derby teammate David Webb, for a fee of £40,000. He scored on his debut in a 3–0 victory over Blackpool, winning promotion to the Third Division in 1982. However, he was released in 1983 and spent a brief period with Cardiff City after being invited for a trial by manager Len Ashurst, playing six times and scoring once in a 3–1 victory over Grimsby Town.

After not being offered an extended contract, and a brief one-of appearance for Scarborough, he moved to Middlesbrough before finishing his professional career with Stockport County and Torquay United.
