= Mike Bateson =

English football chairman

Michael Bateson is an English businessman and former chairman of Torquay United Football Club.

Bateson was brought up in Blackpool and after a spell in the Scots Guards made his fortune selling double glazing in the South-West of England. In May 1990, after selling his windows company, he became chairman of Torquay United and saw the side promoted to Football League Third Division at the end of the next season, Torquay beating Blackpool on penalties in the Football League Fourth Division play-off final at Wembley Stadium, in doing so becoming the first Football League team to win promotion on penalties. However, they lasted just one season at this level before being relegated, and did not win promotion for 12 years. During those 12 years, they came close to being relegated to the Conference on no less than three occasions (once finishing bottom of the league and only retaining their status because the Conference champions did not meet the Football League requirements for stadium capacity), though on a more positive note they did qualify for the playoffs once (in 1998), losing to Colchester United.

In July 2002, he sparked controversy when deciding that the club's assistant manager had to be registered as a player, meaning that David Preece had to leave the club as he was retiring as a player, though Bateson admitted that the club could not afford to keep Preece on their payroll anyway. This sparked the resignation of manager Roy McFarland soon afterwards.

Promotion from the league's basement division was at long last achieved in 2004, but relegation took place after just one season and the following year they narrowly avoided a second successive relegation.

On 12 October 2006 Bateson sold his stake in the club to a consortium headed by Chris Roberts, ending 16 years at the club which had seen two promotions, two relegations and numerous scrapes with relegation from the Football League to the Conference. With the deal to be completed over a four-year period, Bateston retained his position as majority shareholder, though stepped away from the club.

However, Roberts resigned on 21 February 2007 amid growing criticism from all quarters. Local hotel owner Keith Richardson took over as chairman, but on 7 March 2007 it was announced that Bateson had returned as chairman. He immediately restored his wife Sue to a Director's post, promoted his daughter Debbie, wife of former Torquay player, groundsman and coach Richard Hancox, to managing director and reappointed three locally based directors who had resigned as a protest over Roberts' handling of the club.

In May 2007, after Torquay's relegation to the Conference National, Bateson stood down as chairman of Torquay United, with Mervyn Benney taking over. Later that month he agreed to sell his stake in the club to a consortium headed by Cris Boyce, son of former Torquay United chairman, Tony Boyce. and the club has prospered as a result.

Preceded by Lew Pope	Torquay United F.C. Chairman; 1990-2006	Succeeded by Chris Roberts
Preceded by Keith Richardson	Torquay United F.C. Chairman; 2007	Succeeded by Mervyn Benney
