= Eddie Niedzwiecki =

Welsh footballer and coach

Personal information
- Full name: Andrzej Edward Niedzwiecki
- Date of birth: 3 May 1959 (age 67)
- Place of birth: Bangor, Wales
- Height: 6 ft 0 in (1.83 m)
- Position: Goalkeeper

Senior career*
| Years | Team | Apps | (Gls) |
| 1977–1983 | Wrexham | 111 | (0) |
| 1983–1988 | Chelsea | 136 | (0) |
| Total | | 247 | (0) |

International career
| 1985–1987 | Wales | 2 | (0) |

Managerial career
- 1991: Reading (caretaker)
- 2012: Queens Park Rangers (caretaker)
- 2018: Stoke City (caretaker)
- 2019–2020: Reading (assistant)
- * Club domestic league appearances and goals

Andrzej Edward Niedzwiecki (born 3 May 1959) is a Welsh football coach and former footballer who played as a goalkeeper.

After retiring early due to injury Niedzwiecki became a coach with Chelsea and then Arsenal before working alongside Mark Hughes with the Wales national team. Since then he has worked with Hughes at Blackburn Rovers, Manchester City, Fulham, Queens Park Rangers, Stoke City and Southampton.

== Playing career ==
Starting his playing career with Wrexham at the age of 14, Niedzwiecki won the Third Division title of 1978 with the side. He stayed with the club until the summer of 1983, when he was signed for Chelsea by former Wrexham manager, John Neal. He quickly won a regular place in the Chelsea starting line-up and was impressive as the side won the Second Division title in his first season. He also earned two caps for Wales during his playing career.

== Coaching career ==
Niedzwiecki was forced to retire aged 28, after battling numerous injuries. He later became a coach at Chelsea, eventually leaving the club in November 2000 after the arrival of Claudio Ranieri. Niedzwiecki then linked up shortly after with Arsenal, succeeding the late George Armstrong as reserve team coach. He also worked as a part-time coach with Wales, under new manager Mark Hughes during this time. In September 2004, he joined Blackburn Rovers, again under Hughes, as a first-team coach. When Hughes left for Manchester City four years later, he was among several at Blackburn who followed him to Manchester.

However, on 19 December 2009 Hughes and his backroom staff were relieved of their duties at the Sky Blues. Niedzwiecki once again linked up as a coach with Hughes in 2010 at Fulham. He left the club in the summer of 2011 alongside Hughes. In 2012, he joined Queens Park Rangers as a member of the coaching staff, after Hughes was appointed as the side's manager. He together with Mark Bowen were briefly appointed as joint caretaker managers after Hughes' dismissal in November 2012. Niedzwiecki then went on to join up with Hughes at Stoke City in June 2013. He left Stoke in January 2018.

In March 2018, he was appointed assistant first-team coach at Southampton, following the appointment of Hughes as manager. In May 2018, after Southampton's Premier League status for the following season was confirmed, it was announced that Niedzwiecki had signed a new long-term contract. On 3 December 2018, he was dismissed following the sacking of Mark Hughes.

In October 2019, Niedzwiecki was pictured with new Reading F.C. boss Mark Bowen.

In March 2022, following Bowen's appointment at AFC Wimbledon, Niedzwiecki was appointed assistant manager of the League One club. He left the club in the summer, alongside manager Bowen.

In June 2022, he returned to Reading, alongside Bowen, taking on the role of Director of Player Development. He departed the club in January 2024 due to a restructuring of the club's coaching staff on account of financial difficulties.

== Personal life ==
Niedzwiecki was born in Wales to Polish parents who emigrated to North Wales after the Second World War.

== Career statistics ==
=== As a player ===
- Sourced from Eddie Niedzwiecki at the English National Football Archive (subscription required)

Appearances and goals by club, season and competition
| Club | Season | League | | | FA Cup | | League Cup | | Other^{[A]} | | Total | |
| Club | Season | Division | Apps | Goals | Apps | Goals | Apps | Goals | Apps | Goals | Apps | Goals |
|---|---|---|---|---|---|---|---|---|---|---|---|---|
| Wrexham | 1977–78 | Third Division | 15 | 0 | 1 | 0 | 0 | 0 | 1 | 0 | 17 | 0 |
| Wrexham | 1978–79 | Second Division | 6 | 0 | 0 | 0 | 0 | 0 | 0 | 0 | 6 | 0 |
| Wrexham | 1979–80 | Second Division | 6 | 0 | 0 | 0 | 2 | 0 | 0 | 0 | 8 | 0 |
| Wrexham | 1980–81 | Second Division | 0 | 0 | 0 | 0 | 0 | 0 | 0 | 0 | 0 | 0 |
| Wrexham | 1981–82 | Second Division | 42 | 0 | 4 | 0 | 5 | 0 | 0 | 0 | 51 | 0 |
| Wrexham | 1982–83 | Third Division | 42 | 0 | 2 | 0 | 2 | 0 | 0 | 0 | 46 | 0 |
| Wrexham | Total | | 111 | 0 | 7 | 0 | 9 | 0 | 1 | 0 | 128 | 0 |
| Chelsea | 1983–84 | Second Division | 42 | 0 | 1 | 0 | 5 | 0 | 0 | 0 | 48 | 0 |
| Chelsea | 1984–85 | First Division | 40 | 0 | 3 | 0 | 9 | 0 | 0 | 0 | 52 | 0 |
| Chelsea | 1985–86 | First Division | 30 | 0 | 2 | 0 | 8 | 0 | 5 | 0 | 45 | 0 |
| Chelsea | 1986–87 | First Division | 10 | 0 | 2 | 0 | 1 | 0 | 1 | 0 | 14 | 0 |
| Chelsea | 1987–88 | First Division | 14 | 0 | 0 | 0 | 2 | 0 | 0 | 0 | 16 | 0 |
| Chelsea | Total | | 136 | 0 | 8 | 0 | 25 | 0 | 6 | 0 | 175 | 0 |
| Career Total | | | 247 | 0 | 15 | 0 | 34 | 0 | 7 | 0 | 303 | 0 |

A. The "Other" column constitutes appearances and goals in the Full Members Cup.

=== As a manager ===
Managerial record by team and tenure
| Team | From | To | Matches | Won | Drawn | Lost | Win% |
|---|---|---|---|---|---|---|---|
| Queens Park Rangers (caretaker) | 23 November 2012 | 25 November 2012 | 1 | 0 | 0 | 1 | 0.00 |
| Stoke City (caretaker) | 6 January 2018 | 15 January 2018 | 1 | 0 | 0 | 1 | 0.00 |
| Total | | | 2 | 0 | 0 | 2 | 0.00 |

== Honours ==
Wrexham

- Football League Third Division champions: 1977–78

Chelsea

- Football League Second Division champions: 1983–84
