= Richard Hancox =

English footballer

Personal information
- Date of birth: 4 October 1968 (age 58)
- Place of birth: Stourbridge, England
- Position: Midfielder

Senior career*
Years	Team	Apps	(Gls)
1992–1993	Stourport Swifts	62	(54)
1993–1997	Torquay United	125	(25)
2005	Torquay United	1	(0)
- * Club domestic league appearances and goals

Richard Hancox (born 4 October 1968) is an English former professional footballer. He has held various roles at Torquay United in his career.

== Career ==
Hancox was born in Stourbridge and first joined Exeter city in 1985, he was not offered a contract and in 1988 he joined Halesowen town playing regularly under the management of the great Paddy Page, after 2 seasons he left to join Cheltenham town, an injury forced Hancox to move to on to Stourport swifts where he scored more than fifty goals in two and a half seasons.

In March 1993 from Hancox was offered a 2-year contract by then manager Neil Warnock at Torquay United Warnock played Hancox as a wide midfielder to create more attacking options in home games, the plan worked and Torquay survived.

The following season Don O'riordon became manager after Warnock moved on to Plymouth. Hancox only played on 10 games that season despite being struck down with glandular fever for eight months, however he came back stronger the following season scoring 16 goals in all competitions including a spectacular hat trick against Cardiff city in the league cup. He left the club after several years with Torquay. Afterwards, he played local semi-pro football for Taunton Town, Bideford & Dawlish town.

He re-emerged at Plainmoor helping out with the youth team. However, when the youth system was abandoned as a cost-cutting measure. Hancox was given a squad number, although this was supposed to be in case of emergencies. Torquay manager Leroy Rosenior included Hancox in the first team squad and even allowed him to come on as a substitute in a 4–1 defeat away to Rochdale in September 2005, replacing the injured Tony Bedeau.

Although, he was selected as substitute in future games, this was to be the last of his playing career at Torquay. He was later made assistant manager. With Rosenior replaced, initially by John Cornforth and then by Ian Atkins, Hancox left after the appointment of Atkins in June 2006 and an announcement was made that he would leave the club's employment at the end of that month. Soon after, he took up a coaching position at Dawlish Town, one of a number of local non-league football clubs he had played for while working for Torquay.

In early November 2006 he left to play for Bideford, but on the 27th of that month returned to Torquay on a part-time basis to assist new manager Luboš Kubík. Torquay were relegated at the end of the 2006–07 season and the club was sold to a local consortium. Hancox himself departed on 14 June 2007, after he had helped restart the Youth Team. Hancox went on to coach various youth teams at Plymouth Argyle. In January 2010 he opened Milber Sports Centre in Newton Abbot, an indoor 3g astro turf training centre. Many local teams train, also 5 a side leagues.
