= Jim Tolmie =

Scottish footballer

Personal information
- Full name: James Tolmie
- Date of birth: 21 November 1960 (age 65)
- Place of birth: Glasgow, Scotland
- Position: Winger

Youth career
- –1978: Auchengill Star B.C.

Senior career*
| Years | Team | Apps | (Gls) |
| 1978–1981 | Morton | 90 | (20) |
| 1981–1983 | Lokeren | 18 | (1) |
| 1983–1986 | Manchester City | 57 | (19) |
| 1986 | → Carlisle United (loan) | 8 | (1) |
| 1986–1991 | Markaryd IF | 151 | (83) |
| 1991–1994 | Morton | 71 | (7) |

International career
| 1979 | Scotland U21 | 1 | (0) |
| 1980 | Scottish Football League XI | 1 | (0) |
- * Club domestic league appearances and goals

James Tolmie (born 21 November 1960) is a Scottish retired footballer who played for clubs including Morton, Lokeren and Manchester City.

He started his career at Morton and made his senior debut on 28 October 1978. Then he was sold to Belgian side Lokeren in 1981, playing 18 games without scoring before returning to Britain in 1983.

Tolmie was signed by Billy McNeill for City from Lokeren for £30,000. Jim was the third signing in nine days made by McNeill, who had himself just joined City from Celtic. He left Manchester City and spent many years playing in Sweden with Markaryd IF, before returning to Morton in 1991. He retired in 1994.
