= Luboš Kubík =

Czech footballer and manager

Personal information
- Date of birth: 20 January 1964 (age 62)
- Place of birth: Vysoké Mýto, Czechoslovakia
- Height: 1.87 m (6 ft 2 in)
- Positions: Midfielder; defender

Youth career
- 1972–1979: Spartak Choceň
- 1979–1982: Spartak Hradec Králové

Senior career*
Years	Team	Apps	(Gls)
1981–1982	Spartak Hradec Králové	28	(2)
1982–1988	TJ Slavia Praha IPS	133	(33)
1989–1991	Fiorentina	50	(8)
1991–1993	Metz	70	(14)
1993–1995	1. FC Nürnberg	40	(5)
1995–1996	FK Drnovice	14	(2)
1996–1997	Slavia Prague	14	(1)
1997–1998	Lázně Bohdaneč	2	(0)
1998–2000	Chicago Fire	71	(15)
2001	Dallas Burn	11	(1)
Total		414	(80)

International career
1985–1993	Czechoslovakia	39	(10)
1994–1997	Czech Republic	17	(3)

Managerial career
- Hradec Králové
- 2006: Śląsk Wrocław
- 2006–2007: Torquay United
- 2007: SK Týniště nad Orlicí
Medal record
Men's football
Representing Czech Republic
UEFA European Championship
Runner-up	1996 England	Team
- * Club domestic league appearances and goals

Luboš Kubík (born 20 January 1964) is a Czech former professional footballer who played as a midfielder or defender. He represented the former Czechoslovakia at the 1990 FIFA World Cup and then the Czech Republic in their runners-up-finishing UEFA Euro 1996 campaign.

Aside from his native Czechia, Kubík also played in Italy, France, Germany and most notably the United States, being named in the MLS Best XI twice in 1998 and 1999.

== Early and personal life ==
Kubík was born on 20 January 1964 in Vysoké Mýto. He attended Prague University of Economics and Business but dropped out.

As a result of his football career, Kubík can speak English and Italian apart from his native Czech, along with some Polish, German, French and Russian. After retiring, he has cooperated with local schools in developing young football talent.

Kubík's son, Luboš Jr., founded the USA Sport and Study organization, where he leads the soccer division.

== Club career ==
=== European football ===
Kubík began his career in 1981 with Hradec Králové before moving to Slavia Prague the following year. In 1988, he and compatriot Ivo Knoflíček fled to England from a training camp in West Germany. In January 1989, they attempted to sign for Derby County as free agents, and were presented as new signings by the club's then-owner, the Czechoslovak-born Robert Maxwell, during a match against Southampton. However, both footballers were still under contract with Slavia Prague, who refused to allow them to transfer.

Upon the expiry of his FIFA disqualification, Kubík signed for Italian club ACF Fiorentina in April 1989 for approximately 600 million lire. Wanting to obtain the required transfer to play in Italy, he came to an agreement with the Czechoslovak Football Federation to fulfil his military service obligations in his homeland first. With Fiorentina, Kubík scored three goals in 26 league matches and played in the 1989–90 UEFA Cup, where the club reached the final before losing to Juventus.

Kubík moved to Ligue 1 club FC Metz in 1991 before transferring to Bundesliga team 1. FC Nürnberg in 1993, Returning to the Czech Republic, he played for Drnovice FK, SK Slavia Prague, and AFK Lázně Bohdaneč.

=== MLS and retirement ===
Kubík moved to Major League Soccer in 1998, joining the expansion team Chicago Fire. While helping the Fire to win both the MLS Cup and the U.S. Open Cup in their inaugural year, Kubík was named the MLS Defender of the Year. Kubík continued to be a valuable attacking force from the back in 1999, registering five goals and eight assists, and was named in the MLS Best XI for a second time.

Kubík signed for Dallas Burn during the 2001 off-season in exchange for Sergi Daniv. Kubík's final year was again plagued by injuries, having only played in 11 matches for the club. He retired at the end of the 2001 MLS season and returned to the Czech Republic.

== International career ==
Kubík debuted for the Czechoslovakia national football team in 1985 against Sweden. He represented Czechoslovakia and Czech Republic national teams, respectively at the 1990 FIFA World Cup and 1996 UEFA European Football Championship. Kubík played his last international game in 1997 against Belarus.

== Managerial career ==
Kubík was appointed as manager of Polish side Śląsk Wrocław in summer 2006, but was sacked later that October after just 11 league games in charge.

Kubík was appointed coach of the EFL League Two side Torquay United on 27 November 2006 through his close friendship with Torquay chairman Chris Roberts. Despite his impressive playing career, his lack of managerial experience and contacts in England was a problem, not aided by Roberts appointing Richard Hancox as Kubík's assistant. Torquay struggled in the relegation zone with Kubík, winning just twice in 15 matches, thus he left club by mutual consent on 5 February 2007. Roberts also resigned as chairman later that month. The club was relegated at the end of the season, ending a 79-year spell in the Football League First Division.

Kubík was appointed coach of third-tier Czech club SK Týniště nad Orlicí in 2007. His first match in charge was a friendly match against Převýšov, the leading champions of the Hradec Králové Regional League. Later that year, he left the club due to poor performances in the league.

In March 2010, Kubík was appointed assistant coach of the United States men's national soccer team for the FIFA World Cup later that year.

== Honours ==
Individuals

- MLS Defender of the Year Award: 1998
- MLS Best XI: 1998, 1999
- MLS All-Star, 1998, 1999
