= Nigel Spackman =

English football player and coach

Personal information
- Full name: Nigel James Spackman
- Date of birth: 2 December 1960 (age 65)
- Place of birth: Romsey, England
- Height: 6 ft 1 in (1.85 m)
- Position: Midfielder

Senior career*
Years	Team	Apps	(Gls)
- Andover
1980–1983	AFC Bournemouth	119	(10)
1983–1987	Chelsea	141	(12)
1987–1989	Liverpool	51	(0)
1989	Queens Park Rangers	29	(1)
1989–1992	Rangers	100	(1)
1992–1996	Chelsea	67	(0)
1996–1998	Sheffield United	24	(0)
Total		521	(24)

Managerial career
- 1997–1998: Sheffield United (player-manager)
- 2001: Barnsley
- 2006: Millwall
- * Club domestic league appearances and goals

Nigel James Spackman (born 2 December 1960) is an English sports television pundit and former professional football player and coach.

He played as a midfielder from 1980 to 1998, notably for Liverpool, Chelsea and Rangers. He also played for AFC Bournemouth, Queens Park Rangers and Sheffield United. He initially started out with Non-league Andover. He took over as player-manager of Sheffield United in 1997, but lasted less than a year.

He became a full time manager from 1997 and had brief spells in charge of Barnsley in 2001 and Millwall in 2006. He now works for the Glenn Hoddle Academy as well as working as a pundit and co-commentator.

== Playing career ==
Born in Romsey, Hampshire, Spackman started at Andover and spent his first three years as a professional with AFC Bournemouth before joining Chelsea for £35,000 in the summer of 1983. He signed for Chelsea as part of manager John Neal's re-building of the side alongside the likes of Kerry Dixon, Pat Nevin and David Speedie. Spackman scored on his debut for the club in a 5–0 opening day win over Derby County, though he was not a regular goalscorer. Chelsea were promoted at the end of that season as Second Division champions and finished 6th in the following two seasons back in the top tier, with Spackman a near ever-present. During the 1986–87 season, several key players, including Spackman, fell out with manager John Hollins and he was sporadically left out of the starting line-up or played out of position. He was sold to Liverpool in 1987 for £400,000.

Initially he was a frequently used substitute at Liverpool, and he was in the team which lost the 1987 League Cup final to Arsenal. Spackman only had a regular role in the Liverpool team during this season, but played an essential role.

When regular midfield general Ronnie Whelan was injured early in the campaign, Spackman was handed the No.5 shirt and he never missed a game for the whole campaign, gaining plaudits for his unselfish running and industry around the park in a team which featured the likes of John Barnes, Peter Beardsley and John Aldridge.

Liverpool lost just twice in the league all season, claiming the title with ease and Spackman was in the side which beat Nottingham Forest 5–0. Spackman's stamina and unselfishness set up the last goal for Aldridge. Whelan was fit again with a month of the season left, but wasn't selected. Spackman was selected for the rest of the campaign, including the FA Cup Final, which Liverpool surprisingly lost to Wimbledon. Spackman and teammate Gary Gillespie both played that game with bandages around their heads after the two had suffered cuts in a clash during a game against Derby County the previous week.

He left Liverpool for Queens Park Rangers in February 1989 but stayed there for less than a year, joining Scottish side Rangers in November 1989, winning honours there including three Scottish Premier Division titles, the Scottish Cup and the Scottish League Cup. He went back to Chelsea in 1992 before moving to Sheffield United in 1996 as player-coach and assistant-manager to Howard Kendall.

== Managerial career ==
When Kendall left the Blades in 1997 Spackman became caretaker manager before being appointed as manager on 5 August. United had a good start to the season but huge losses and high wages from the previous season's promotion failure led to enforced sales of key personnel. The final straw being the sale of both of the club's top scoring strikers (Brian Deane – 11 league goals – went to S.L. Benfica & Jan Åge Fjørtoft – 9 league goals – to Barnsley) on the same day. Even though leaving midseason, Deane would go on to become the team's top scorer that year, such was the lack of replacements. Spackman was unhappy over this and resigned in March 1998.

He later managed Barnsley between January and October 2001 but was sacked with the club near the bottom of the table. They were relegated at the end of that season. He re-entered management with Millwall in May 2006 but left only a few months later in September, with the club in the relegation zone of League One. As of 2022, he has failed to manage any club for a full season.

== Media career ==
After Spackman left Barnsley, he began a new career in the media, becoming a pundit with Sky Sports before re-entering management with Millwall in 2006. Spackman currently appears as a regular pundit on Singapore's Football Channel, alongside other former players such as John Burridge and Rob Lee. Spackman regularly appears on Setanta Sport Saturday afternoon as an expert pundit. Spackman currently appears as a pundit on Britain's sports TV station Sports Tonight Live. He also works for Al Jazeera on La Liga Coverage as well as LFC TV. Spackman has also featured for a number of seasons on LFCTV, the home TV channel for Liverpool FC, alongside former colleagues Gary Gillespie and Mark Wright. He recently provided pitch side commentary on Liverpool's victory in the 2022 Community Shield over Manchester City.

== Personal life ==
Spackman is of Scottish descent through a grandfather.

== Honours ==
Chelsea

- Full Members' Cup: 1985–86

Liverpool

- Football League First Division: 1987–88
- FA Cup runner-up: 1987–88
- Football League Cup runner-up: 1986–87

Rangers

- Scottish Premier Division: 1989–90, 1990–91, 1991–92
- Scottish Cup: 1991–92
- Scottish League Cup: 1990–91
