= Gordon Owen =

English footballer (born 1959)

Personal information
- Full name: Gordon Owen
- Date of birth: 14 June 1959 (age 67)
- Place of birth: Barnsley, England
- Height: 5 ft 8 in (1.73 m)
- Position: Winger

Senior career*
Years	Team	Apps	(Gls)
1977–1983	Sheffield Wednesday	47	(5)
1979–1980	→ Rotherham United (loan)	9	(0)
1982–1983	→ Doncaster Rovers (loan)	9	(0)
1983	→ Chesterfield (loan)	6	(2)
1983–1984	Cardiff City	39	(14)
1984–1986	Barnsley	68	(25)
1986–1987	Bristol City	53	(11)
1987	→ Hull City (loan)	3	(0)
1987–1989	Mansfield Town	58	(8)
1989–1991	Blackpool	29	(2)
1990	→ Carlisle United (loan)	5	(0)
1991	→ Exeter City (loan)	4	(0)
- * Club domestic league appearances and goals

Gordon Owen (born 14 June 1959) is an English former professional footballer who made 300 appearances in the Football League.

== Career ==
A much travelled player, Owen was born in Barnsley and began his career at Sheffield Wednesday, featuring in the club's promotion winning season under Jack Charlton in 1979–80. After falling out of favour at the club, spending spells on loan at Rotherham United, Doncaster Rovers and Chesterfield, he left to sign for Cardiff City in August 1983. His only season at Ninian Park saw him finish as the club's top scorer with 18 goals in all competitions but at the end of the season he decided to leave the club as he wanted to return north, signing for his hometown side Barnsley, again finishing as top scorer in his first season.

Owen left Barnsley the following year, signing for Bristol City where he played over 50 times before, after a short loan spell at Hull City, he signed for Mansfield Town. He would later finish his professional career at Blackpool, having loan spells at Carlisle United and Exeter City while at the club, before moving into non-league football.

== Honours ==
Bristol City

- Associate Members' Cup runner-up: 1986–87
