= Matthew Halliday (footballer) =

English footballer

Personal information
- Date of birth: 23 January 1987 (age 39)
- Place of birth: Norwich, England
- Position: Defender

Youth career
- 1999–2006: Norwich City

Senior career*
Years	Team	Apps	(Gls)
2006–2008	Norwich City	0	(0)
2006	→ Hereford United (loan)	0	(0)
2007	→ Torquay United (loan)	3	(0)
2008–2009	Wroxham	27	(1)
2009–2012	Lowestoft Town	61	(4)
2012–2017	Wroxham	161	(3)
2017–2022	Sheringham	74	(3)
Total		326	(11)

Managerial career
- 2020–2023: Sheringham
- 2024: Wroxham (caretaker)
- 2024: Wroxham
- 2024–2026: Harleston Town
- * Club domestic league appearances and goals

Matthew Halliday (born 23 January 1987) is an English football manager and former footballer.

== Early life ==
Halliday was born in Norwich and attended Sprowston High School. At the age of 12, he joined Norwich City as a trainee.

== Norwich City ==
Halliday impressed as a skilful central defender for the club's youth teams and accepted a full-time scholarship offer once he turned 16.

After impressing for the club's reserves during the 2004–05 season, Halliday joined the first team for the 2005–06 pre-season.

In February 2006, Halliday joined Conference National side Hereford United on loan, although it was technically classed as work experience due to him still being a trainee. He was named as a substitute at Hereford United, but did not make a first-team appearance during the loan spell.

Halliday signed his first professional contract at Norwich City in July 2006. He then made his first-team debut for the club in a League Cup match against Torquay United on 23 August 2006, coming on as a late substitute to replace injured captain Adam Drury.

Following his debut, Halliday was unable to break into the first team again and joined League Two side Torquay United on a one-month loan in January 2007. He made three appearances for Torquay United, including his Football League debut against Lincoln City on 10 February 2007, before returning to parent club Norwich City.

Halliday signed a one-year contract extension at Norwich City during the summer of 2007, but was released by manager Glenn Roeder at the end of the 2007–08 season.

== Non-league career ==
Following unsuccessful trials with Conference National side Cambridge United and League One side Northampton Town during the summer of 2008, Halliday signed for Eastern Counties Premier Division side Wroxham in September 2008. He made 27 league appearances for Wroxham during the 2008–09 season, scoring once.

In the summer of 2009, Halliday signed for newly promoted Isthmian League Division One North side Lowestoft Town. In his first season at Lowestoft Town, Halliday played an important role as the club won the title and were promoted to the Isthmian Premier Division for the first time in their history. Following promotion, first team opportunities were more limited for Halliday over the next two seasons, and he left the club at the end of the 2011–12 season. In total, he made 61 league appearances for Lowestoft Town, scoring four goals.

Ahead of the 2012–13 season, Halliday returned to former club Wroxham, who had just achieved promotion to the Isthmian League Division One North. He was an important player for the club over the next five seasons, as the Norfolk side regularly battled to avoid relegation.

He was part of Wroxham's 2014–15 Norfolk Senior Cup winning side, starting at centre-back in the 3–2 victory over Dereham Town at Carrow Road.

Halliday left Wroxham for a second time in the summer of 2017, following the club's relegation back to the Eastern Counties Premier Division.

He signed for Anglian Combination Division One side Sheringham ahead of the 2017–18 season. Sheringham achieved back-to-back promotions in Halliday's first two seasons at the club, reaching the Eastern Counties Division One North for the first time in their history.

== Managerial career ==
In March 2020, shortly after the 2019–20 was abandoned due to the coronavirus pandemic, Halliday was named as Sheringham's new manager following the departures of joint managers Chris Wigger and Darren Eadie to Leiston.

Halliday's first campaign as manager, the 2020–21 season, was again abandoned due to the coronavirus pandemic. In his first full campaign in charge, the 2021–22 season, Sheringham were crowned Eastern Counties Division One North champions and promoted to the Eastern Counties Premier Division for the first time in the club's history.

At the end of the 2022–23 season, Halliday left Sheringham and returned to former club Wroxham as their new assistant manager.

In August 2024, Halliday was promoted to caretaker manager at Wroxham following the departure of manager Jordan Southgate to Lowestoft Town. In September 2024, Halliday was named as Wroxham's new permanent manager. He left the club on 16 November 2024.

On 24 November 2024, Halliday was appointed manager of Eastern Counties League Premier Division club Harleston Town
