= Simon Rayner =

Canadian soccer goalkeeper (born 1983)

Personal information
- Full name: Simon Christopher Rayner
- Date of birth: July 8, 1983 (age 43)
- Place of birth: Langley, British Columbia, Canada
- Height: 6 ft 4 in (1.93 m)
- Position: Goalkeeper

Team information
- Current team: Three Bridges

Youth career
- 2000–2001: AFC Bournemouth

Senior career*
| Years | Team | Apps | (Gls) |
| 2001–2002 | AFC Bournemouth | 0 | (0) |
| 2001–2002 | → Bournemouth FC (loan) | | (0) |
| 2001 | → Salisbury City (loan) | 1 | (0) |
| 2002–2003 | Barry Town | 21 | (0) |
| 2003–2004 | Port Talbot Town | 25 | (0) |
| 2004–2007 | Lincoln City | 4 | (0) |
| 2006 | → Alfreton Town (loan) | 20 | (0) |
| 2007 | → Torquay United (loan) | 10 | (0) |
| 2007–2008 | Torquay United | 13 | (0) |
| 2008–2010 | Crawley Town | 81 | (0) |
| 2011–2026 | Three Bridges | 669 | (0) |

International career
| 2002 | Canada U23 | 2 | (0) |
- * Club domestic league appearances and goals as of September 19, 2011

Simon Christopher Rayner (born July 8, 1983) is a Canadian soccer goalkeeper, currently signed to Three Bridges in the Sussex County League Division One.

== Early career ==
Rayner began his career as a junior with AFC Bournemouth, signing as a trainee professional in August 2000 and turning professional one year later. With Bournemouth having scrapped their U19 side and, as third choice keeper behind Gareth Stewart and Michael Menetrier, opportunities in the reserves limited, Rayner joined Wessex League side Bournemouth FC on loan in August 2001 whilst continuing to train full-time with Bournemouth. He also made a solitary appearance on loan for Salisbury City in their 1–0 home defeat to Welling United on October 6, 2001. In February 2002, in search of first team football, he agreed to cancel his contract with Bournemouth in order to join League of Wales side Barry Town, helping the Welsh side to the League and Cup double at the end of the season.

In December 2002, he played for the Canadian Under-23 team against the United States.

He left Barry in the summer of 2003, joining Port Talbot Town in July that year. At end of the following season Rayner had trials with Newcastle United and Swansea City, but joined Lincoln City in August 2004.

He made his league debut for Lincoln on September 25, 2004, but struggled to establish himself due to the presence of Alan Marriott as Lincoln's first choice keeper. Rayner joined non-league Alfreton Town on loan in January 2006.

He joined Torquay United on an emergency loan on March 1, 2007, making his debut the following day in the 1–1 draw away to Chester City. He played ten times for Torquay before being recalled by Lincoln, this coming after Torquay had already been relegated to the Conference Premier. He was released by Lincoln at the end of the season.

On June 4, 2007 Rayner signed for Torquay United on a two-year contract and despite competition from another new signing, Martin Rice, began the season as Torquay's regular goalkeeper in the Conference.

Rayner spent only a single season at Plainmoor, and joined Crawley Town in June 2008. At the time it was reported that Rayner had been made available for transfer following a falling-out with Torquay manager, Paul Buckle. The Canadian stopper was a mainstay in the first-team throughout his first two seasons at Crawley, although Rayner was displaced by young goalkeeper, Nick Jordan, towards the end of his second season at the club. At the culmination of the 2009/10 campaign, it was announced that Rayner was not to be retained by Crawley.

In July 2011, it was announced that Rayner had signed for Three Bridges of Sussex County League Division One.

=== International ===
He has represented Canada at Youth, Under-20 and Under-23 levels.
