= Wayne Matthews (footballer) =

Welsh footballer (born 1964)

Personal information
- Full name: Wayne John Matthews
- Date of birth: 11 September 1964 (age 62)
- Place of birth: Cardiff, Wales
- Position: Midfielder

Senior career*
Years	Team	Apps	(Gls)
1983–1985	Cardiff City	14	(0)
1985–1986	Barry Town	10	(0)
1986–1988	Ton Pentre		
1988–1992	Barry Town	94	(11)
1992–1993	Cwmbrân Town	8	(0)
1993	Llanidloes Town	6	(1)
- Ely Rangers

Managerial career
- 2007–: Ely Rangers
- * Club domestic league appearances and goals

Wayne John Matthews (born 11 September 1964) is a Welsh former professional footballer who played as a midfielder. He made fourteen appearances in the Football League for Cardiff City and later played for several teams in the Welsh leagues.

== Career ==
Born in Cardiff, Matthews began his career with his hometown club Cardiff City. He made his professional debut on the opening day of the 1983–84 season, replacing Chris Rodon during a 2–0 defeat to Charlton Athletic. Scoring in a 5–0 victory over Taff's Well in the Welsh Cup.

He joined Barry Town following his release before moving to Ton Pentre the following year. He returned to Barry in 1988 and went on to make over 100 appearances in all competitions for the club. In 1992, he joined League of Wales side Cwmbrân Town where he played eight times as they won the league title. However, he was one of two players released midway through the season as the club were unable to pay their £80 a week wages. Following his release, Matthews briefly worked at Ninian Park, the home ground of his former club Cardiff City, selling burgers. He finished the season with rival League of Wales side Llanidloes Town.

In May 2007, 24 years after making his senior debut, Matthews received the first red card of his career while playing for Ely Rangers in the Welsh Football League. He was appointed player-manager of Ely a month later.

== Later life ==
Matthews married his partner Linda and they have two children together, Jay and Sherelle. In 1993, Wayne Matthews started his own manufacturing business by embroidering sportswear in his bedroom. The Company Classic Sportswear Manufacturing Ltd has grown since that day to become a full sportswear manufacturing company run by directors Wayne and Linda Matthews. Manufacturing sportswear for the 2012 London Olympics, premiership football teams and teams around Europe. Still a family-run business and expanding in 2020 with additional new director and son Jay Matthews. Wayne Matthews set up a charity for mental health in 2019n with former Footballer David Cotterill. David Cotterill Foundation and matthews is a named Trustee.
