= Martin Goldsmith (footballer) =

Welsh footballer

Personal information
- Full name: Martin Sidney Goldsmith
- Date of birth: 25 May 1962 (age 64)
- Place of birth: Carmarthen, Wales
- Position: Forward

Senior career*
Years	Team	Apps	(Gls)
1979–1980	Carmarthen Town		
1980–1984	Cambridge United	35	(5)
1984	Cardiff City	9	(2)
1984–1985	Merthyr Tydfil		
1985–1988	Barry Town	79	(57)
1995–1996	Afan Lido	8	(1)
- * Club domestic league appearances and goals

Martin Sidney Goldsmith (born 25 May 1962) is a Welsh former professional footballer who played as a forward.

== Early life ==
Goldsmith was born in Carmarthen, Wales, United Kingdom, on 25 May 1962. He worked as a hairdresser as a teenager.

== Career ==
Goldsmith played as an amateur for Carmarthen Town from 1979 to 1980. After scoring seven goals in a Welsh Cup match, he attracted attention from several Football League sides before signing for Cambridge United. However, he struggled to establish himself in the team, making 35 league appearances over four years before being released.

He joined Cardiff City in January 1984, where he made nine league appearances before moving into non-league football. He joined Merthyr Tydfil, playing with them for only a year before he signed for Barry Town. His time with Barry Town marked the most active part of his career, scoring 57 league goals in 79 appearances across three seasons. After leaving the sport in 1988, he returned in 1995 for a single season in the Welsh Premier League, where he played for Afan Lido.

Goldsmith is retired
