= Jerry Murphy =

Footballer (born 1959)

Personal information
- Date of birth: 23 September 1959 (age 67)
- Place of birth: Stepney, Greater London
- Height: 5 ft 9 in (1.75 m)
- Position: Midfielder

Youth career
- Crystal Palace

Senior career*
Years	Team	Apps	(Gls)
1976–1985	Crystal Palace	229	(20)
1985–1988	Chelsea	34	(3)
1988–1989	Fisher Athletic		
1989	Blacktown City	2	(0)
1989–1990	Wollongong City	16	(0)

International career
1975	England Schoolboys	9	(1)
1979–1980	Republic of Ireland	3	(0)
- * Club domestic league appearances and goals

Jeremiah Michael Murphy (born 23 September 1959) is a retired professional footballer who played as a midfielder in the League for Crystal Palace and Chelsea before moving into non-league football with Fisher Athletic. Born in England, he made three appearances for the Republic of Ireland national team.

== Career ==
Murphy started out with Terry Venables' Crystal Palace, spending nine years at Selhurst Park during which time he won the FA Youth Cup in both 1977 and 1978 as part of the famous "Team of the Eighties". The club were then promoted to the First Division in Murphy's first full season in the side, but were relegated after two seasons in the top flight. However, Murphy remained with Palace winning the "Player of the Year" award in 1983.

He moved back to the top flight again, joining Chelsea on a free transfer in the summer of 1985.

He scored in a 1–1 draw at Everton which put Chelsea briefly top of the league. The daily mirror's back page headline the next day was "Jerry and the Pacemakers". His time at Stamford Bridge was affected by lack of form and injury problems. In three seasons he made only 34 league appearances and his contract was cancelled due to injury in March 1988. He joined non-league side Fisher Athletic to finish his career.

== See also ==
- List of Republic of Ireland international footballers born outside the Republic of Ireland
