= Joe McLaughlin (footballer) =

Scottish footballer

Personal information
- Date of birth: 2 June 1960 (age 66)
- Place of birth: Greenock, Scotland
- Height: 6 ft 1 in (1.85 m)
- Position: Defender

Senior career*
Years	Team	Apps	(Gls)
1977–1983	Greenock Morton	134	(3)
1983–1989	Chelsea	220	(5)
1989–1990	Charlton Athletic	31	(0)
1990–1992	Watford	46	(2)
1992–1996	Falkirk	87	(6)
1996–1997	Hibernian	18	(0)
1997–2000	Clydebank	76	(4)
2000	St Mirren	3	(1)
Total		615	(21)

International career
1980–1983	Scotland U21	10	(0)
- * Club domestic league appearances and goals

Joe McLaughlin (born 2 June 1960) is a Scottish retired professional footballer who played for Chelsea for six seasons in the 1980s.

== Playing career ==
McLaughlin started his playing career with Greenock Morton in 1977. During his time at Greenock he became a regular in the Scotland national under-21 football team, winning 10 caps. In 1983, he was transferred to Chelsea for a fee of £100,000. McLaughlin began his career at Chelsea by winning the Second Division championship in his first season. He would go on to play for Chelsea until 1989 winning another Second Division championship as well as the Full Members Cup.

He was then transferred to Charlton Athletic for £650,000 which at that time made him Charlton's record transfer. After one season at Charlton, he was sold to Watford for £500,000. He spent two seasons as Watford captain before returning home to Scotland to play for Falkirk

Injury meant he made only 8 appearances in his first season at Falkirk, the team were relegated from the Premier League. However the following season Joe would captain the team to success by securing the First Division championship. Falkirk almost qualified for Europe the following season and after 4 years at Falkirk, McLaughin was transferred to Hibernian before going on to play for Clydebank and then St Mirren.

== Coaching career ==
McLaughlin is a UEFA A Licence coach and was part of the coaching staff at St Mirren in 1999 whilst still playing. He moved to Clydebank and was also player/coach. In 2001 McLaughlin moved back to London by accepting a position to work with Mark McGhee at Millwall. The club reached the play-offs in his first season, narrowly losing to Birmingham City who eventually won promotion the Premiership. After leaving Millwall, McLaughlin returned to Greenock Morton to be Head of youth Academy and also had six games as caretaker manager.

Joe currently runs a successful Soccer Scholarship business Soccer Icon USA, a company that specialises in sending top young footballers to play soccer and study at some of the best USA Colleges. As of May 2019, McLaughlin was assistant manager at Albion Rovers and head of scouting in Scotland for Fulham FC.

== Honours ==
Chelsea

- Football League Second Division: 1983–84, 1988–89
- Full Members' Cup: 1985–86

Falkirk

- Scottish Football League First Division: 1993–94
- Scottish Challenge Cup: 1993–94

St Mirren

- Scottish Football League First Division: 1999–2000
