= Colin Lee =

English football manager and footballer

Personal information
- Date of birth: 12 June 1956 (age 70)
- Place of birth: Torquay, England
- Height: 6 ft 1 in (1.85 m)
- Position: Midfielder

Senior career*
Years	Team	Apps	(Gls)
1974–1977	Bristol City	0	(0)
1974–1975	→ Hereford United (loan)	9	(0)
1977	Torquay United	35	(14)
1977–1980	Tottenham Hotspur	62	(18)
1980–1987	Chelsea	185	(36)
1987–1989	Brentford	24	(1)
Total		315	(69)

Managerial career
- 1990: Watford
- 1998–2000: Wolverhampton Wanderers
- 2001: Torquay United
- 2002–2004: Walsall
- 2005–2006: Millwall
- * Club domestic league appearances and goals

Colin Lee (born 12 June 1956) is an English football manager and former player. He is head of football at South Dartmoor Community College in Ashburton, Devon along with Chris Beard.

== Playing career ==
Lee began his football career with Buckfastleigh Rangers and then as an apprentice with Bristol City, turning professional in July 1974, but failed to break into the first team. He joined Hereford United on loan in November 1974, playing 9 times before returning to the reserves at Ashton Gate. He moved to Torquay United in January 1977, quickly establishing himself in Frank O'Farrell's side and attracting attention from higher-level clubs.

In October 1977, after 14 goals in 35 games he left Plainmoor to join Tottenham Hotspur for £60,000, making an immediate impact by scoring 4 goals on his debut in a 9–0 win over Bristol Rovers in the Football League Second Division, helping Spurs win promotion at the end of that season.

In January 1980, he moved back down to the Second Division and signed for Chelsea for a fee of £200,000, having scored 18 times in 62 games for Spurs. He stayed at Stamford Bridge for over seven years, scoring 36 goals in 185 league games, playing as a central defender towards the end of his time there. He helped them win promotion to the First Division as Second Division champions in 1984, playing at right full-back in the latter part of that season, followed by seventh and sixth-place finishes – the peak sixth-place finish coming in the 1985–86 season.

In 1985–86 Chelsea won the Full Members Cup, with Lee scoring twice in the 5–4 win over Manchester City at Wembley.

In July 1987 a fee of £17,500 took him to Third Division side Brentford where he combined his playing duties with that of his position of youth development officer. He retired from playing in the summer of 1989 after scoring once in 24 games.

== Managerial career ==
=== Watford ===
Lee was appointed youth coach at Watford before taking over as manager in March 1990. However, he was sacked in November the following season after a dismal start had seen Watford win only two games when they had been hoping for a promotion challenge in the Second Division.

In 1991, Lee returned to the game as youth coach at Reading, later becoming assistant manager to Mark McGhee. He helped them win the Division Two championship in 1994 and followed McGhee to Leicester a few months later. When McGhee ended his year-long reign at Filbert Street to take charge of Wolverhampton Wanderers, Lee again followed.

=== Wolverhampton Wanderers ===
During Lee's time as assistant manager, Wolves were semi-finalists in the Division One play-offs and the FA Cup, and Lee was promoted to the manager's seat in November 1998, after McGhee was sacked. His initial caretaker spell beginning with a 6–1 win against Bristol City at Ashton Gate. The next two seasons saw Wolves just miss out on the Division One play-offs, and he was sacked in December 2000 with the Midlanders struggling in the bottom half of the division. His task was not helped by the sale of several key players, including top scorer Ade Akinbiyi, towards the end of his spell as Wolves manager.

After leaving Molineux, he joined Leeds United as a scout, a job he held until March 2001, when he was called in by Torquay United chairman Mike Bateson as a consultant to the under pressure manager Wes Saunders in a desperate battle to keep Torquay out of the Conference. When Saunders was sacked soon after (on 28 March 2001), Lee took over as caretaker manager until the end of the season, and guided the side to the heights of 21st place and safety thanks to a nerve-wracking win at Barnet on the final day of the season which saw Barnet relegated.

=== Torquay United ===
After much negotiating at the end of the season, Lee verbally agreed to become the new manager of Torquay. However, on 2 July, the day on which he was expected to formally sign his contract, he turned down the offer, leaving Torquay managerless less than a week before the start of pre-season training. The reason he gave that he was still looking for a job at a higher level, although in November 2001, he was still scouting for Leeds United, as well as working for both television and radio. The following month, he was appointed first team coach at Second Division club Wigan Athletic.

=== Walsall ===
In January 2002, Lee was named as manager of Division One strugglers Walsall, and kept them clear of relegation for the next two seasons. However, he was sacked in March 2004 after allegedly talking to Plymouth Argyle about the possibility of replacing Paul Sturrock as manager. While Walsall actually gave permission for Lee to speak to Plymouth, and Lee publicly turned the job down, Walsall owner Jeff Bonser claimed that if Lee was truly committed then he wouldn't have even spoken to Plymouth, and that as his actions were tantamount to misconduct, he would not receive any compensation (though Bonser eventually paid up Lee's contract after intervention from the League Managers Association). Lee's last game in charge was an ultimately crucial 3-0 defeat away at Gillingham, the Kent side eventually surviving at the expense of the Saddlers with a goal difference that was better by a single goal.

=== Millwall ===
Lee began his fourth full-time manager's job in July 2005 with Millwall, succeeding Steve Claridge who had been sacked after just 36 days at the helm by the club's new owners. Millwall were bottom for much of the first half of the 2005–06 Championship campaign, and just before Christmas he became Director of Football. Defender David Tuttle took over the managerial duties, with Lee leaving Millwall in January 2006.

=== Torquay United ===
In January 2007, Lee returned to the coaching staff at Torquay United, taking temporary control of playing matters with the departure of Lubos Kubik in early February, he was then appointed Director of Football on 6 February on a three-year contract, making his first act the appointment of former Torquay United and England player Keith Curle as the replacement for Kubik. Lee and Curle were unable to save Torquay from relegation and Lee was made redundant on 14 May 2007 after club owner Mike Bateson stood down as chairman. However, Lee returned to Torquay United, this time as Chief Executive, on 25 May 2007 after Bateson's sale of the club to a local consortium headed by Cris Boyce. On 2 June 2007. He appointed former Torquay player Paul Buckle as the new team manager. After a near-miss in 2008, the club were promoted in 2009 through the play-offs and stayed up in their first season back in League Two. In the summer of 2010 Torquay decided to axe the Chief Executive's role, and Lee subsequently left the club.

=== Notts County ===
Following Keith Curle's appointment as Notts County manager, Colin Lee was re-united with the former Torquay manager, at the East Midlands club on 20 February 2012.

== Managerial statistics ==
As of 7 March 2015

Team	Nat	From	To	Record				
Team	Nat	From	To	G	W	D	L	Win %
Watford	(England)	1 March 1990	27 November 1990	35	7	10	18	20.00
Wolverhampton Wanderers	(England)	5 November 1998	18 December 2000	111	44	33	34	39.64
Torquay United	(England)	28 March 2001	2 July 2001	9	3	4	2	33.33
Walsall	(England)	24 January 2002	16 April 2004	116	38	30	48	32.76
Millwall	(England)	27 July 2005	21 December 2005	28	6	9	13	21.43
Total				299	98	86	115	32.78

== Honours ==
Chelsea

- Full Members' Cup: 1985–86
