= Pat Nevin =

Scottish footballer (born 1963)

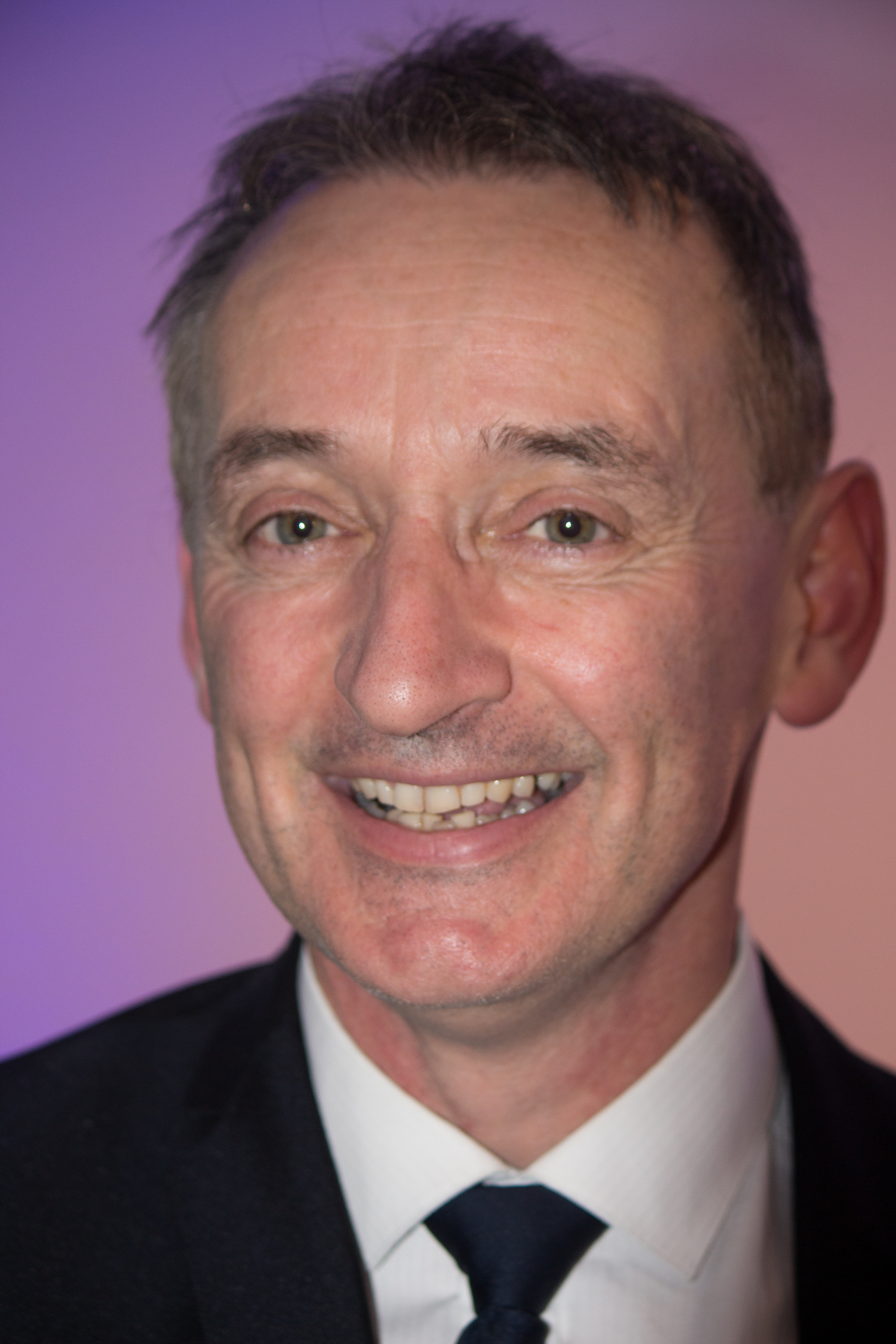
- Nevin in 2017

Personal information
- Full name: Patrick Kevin Francis Michael Nevin
- Date of birth: 6 September 1963 (age 63)
- Place of birth: Glasgow, Scotland
- Height: 1.68 m (5 ft 6 in)
- Position: Winger

Senior career*
Years	Team	Apps	(Gls)
1981–1983	Clyde	73	(17)
1983–1988	Chelsea	193	(36)
1988–1992	Everton	109	(16)
1992–1997	Tranmere Rovers	193	(30)
1997–1998	Kilmarnock	34	(6)
1998–2000	Motherwell	58	(2)
Total		660	(107)

International career
1982	Scotland U18		
1983	Scotland U20		
1984–1985	Scotland U21	5	(1)
1986–1996	Scotland	28	(5)
1987–1996	Scotland B	4	(0)
1990	SFA (SFL centenary)	1	(0)
Medal record
Scotland
UEFA European U-18 Championship
Winner	1982	Team competition
- * Club domestic league appearances and goals

Patrick Kevin Francis Michael Nevin (born 6 September 1963) is a Scottish former professional footballer who played as a winger. In a twenty-year career, he appeared for Clyde, Chelsea, Everton, Tranmere Rovers, Kilmarnock and Motherwell. He won 28 caps for Scotland, scattered across a ten-year international career, and was selected for the UEFA Euro 1992 finals squad. Since retiring as a player, Nevin has worked as a chief executive of Motherwell and as a football writer and broadcaster.

== Club career ==
=== Clyde ===
Nevin trained with Celtic as a youngster, but was rejected for being too small. He was signed by Clyde in 1981. In his first season, the club were promoted as Scottish Second Division champions; Nevin scored 14 goals in 30 starts and was voted SPFA Second Division Player of the Year. He scored six goals in 44 starts in his second season with the club.

He was inducted into the inaugural Clyde FC Hall of Fame in 2011.

=== Chelsea ===
Nevin arrived at Stamford Bridge in mid-1983 for £95,000, in a team managed by John Neal. Nevin's skill and pace made him a pivotal player at Chelsea and he very soon became a firm favourite with the fans. In 1983–84, he scored 14 goals, created numerous others for the likes of Kerry Dixon and David Speedie and put in some dazzling performances – during a 4–0 win over Newcastle United, he tormented the opposition defence, leaving five defenders trailing in his wake – as Chelsea won promotion as Second Division champions. In the same season he was voted Chelsea's player of the year.

Chelsea finished a respectable sixth in the First Division and reached the League Cup semi-final in 1984–85. Nevin set up three goals in the quarter-final against Sheffield Wednesday as Chelsea came back from 3–0 down to draw 4–4, and he set up the winning goal scored by David Speedie in the replay. The club were in the title race for much of the 1985–86 season, with Nevin scoring a late equaliser against Liverpool at Anfield and a crucial header against West Ham United to seal a 2–1 win. A late collapse saw Chelsea finish sixth after being in the title race for most of the season.

The club's performances dropped and they finished 14th in 1986–87, though Nevin was again voted Chelsea player of the year. They were relegated a year later.

=== Everton ===
Chelsea were relegated in 1988 and Nevin was sold to Everton. He scored 20 goals in 138 appearances for the club, but struggled to re-capture his previous form with manager Colin Harvey adopting a far more rigid system. He helped the side reach the FA Cup final in 1989, scoring the winner against Norwich City in the semi-final, but they lost 3–2 in the final to arch-rivals Liverpool.

Howard Kendall returned to the club as manager in November 1990; he and Nevin openly disagreed with each other, which reduced Nevin's playing opportunities, as did the arrival of new wingers Robert Warzycha and Mark Ward.

Nevin was unfortunate to arrive at Everton just after one of the finest spells in their history, when they had collected two league titles, an FA Cup and the European Cup Winners' Cup. In contrast, Nevin's four seasons at the club saw a runners-up medal in the FA Cup (1989) being the closest he came to being part of a trophy winning side, and they never finished higher than sixth in the league (1990).

=== Tranmere Rovers ===
Nevin spent time on loan with fellow Merseyside club Tranmere Rovers, then in the second tier of English football, before signing permanently in 1992. The club competed in the Division One play-offs in three consecutive seasons (1992–93, 1993–94 and 1994–95) but on each occasion they were eliminated in the semi-final.

=== Return to Scotland ===
In 1997, Nevin returned to Scotland and played for Kilmarnock and later Motherwell before retiring in 2000.

== International career ==
In 1982 while playing for Clyde, Nevin travelled to Finland to play for the Scotland U18 team at the UEFA European Youth Championship and was named player of the tournament after helping Scotland win it. The following year, he starred for the Scotland U20 team that reached the quarter-finals of the FIFA World Youth Championship.

Nevin won 28 caps for the Scottish national side, making his debut against Romania in 1986. He scored five goals in a ten-year international career and played at Euro 92, but was not selected in the final squads for the 1986 or 1990 World Cups. He made his final appearance for Scotland in 1996 but did not appear at the Euro 96 finals.

== Post-playing career ==
After retiring as a player, Nevin became chief executive of Motherwell. He resigned in April 2002, after Motherwell chairman John Boyle put the club into administration due to financial problems.

He works as a football pundit on television and radio. Nevin co-wrote a book, In Ma Head, Son, with psychologist Dr George Sik. It explores Nevin's worries, motivation and troubles during the 1996–97 season at Tranmere Rovers as he neared the end of his playing career.

He has an arts degree from Glasgow Caledonian University. His interest in literature, the arts, and his musical taste distinguishes him from many of his peers. He preferred The Fall and Joy Division to Phil Collins or Lionel Richie. He was interviewed by music magazine NME and was a guest music presenter on Radio City during his Everton and Tranmere career.

At the second Bowlie Weekender, hosted by ATP he played a DJ set, playing Belle & Sebastian, Orange Juice and "My New House" by The Fall while wearing a The Pains of Being Pure at Heart T-shirt. The following day he slipped an indiepop reference onto 5 Live while talking about the Man Utd vs Arsenal match. He has also appeared as a guest DJ at Scared To Dance and How Does It Feel To Be Loved?, which are both indiepop club nights in London. He makes a guest appearance on the 1986 Ted Chippington / Vindaloo Summer Special (with Robert Lloyd & The Nightingales and Fuzzbox) video of "Rockin With Rita".

In 2010, Nevin signed as a non-playing substitute for new club Chester after Colin Murray of BBC Radio 5 Live offered the new club £2,000 if they named Nevin and Perry Groves as unused substitutes at every game in the 2010–11 season. This was live on 'Kicking off with Colin Murray', a show Nevin has appeared on every week since the start of the 2009–10 season.

== Personal life ==
Nevin grew up supporting Celtic. He switched his support to Hibernian after feeling that his boyhood club had become a large corporate organisation and the Celtic Park stadium no longer felt like home. Another reason was Celtic fans chanting IRA songs. He also supports his former club Chelsea, and wrote a weekly column for the Chelsea website. Nevin lives in Duns, a small town in the Scottish Borders with his wife and two children. His daughter, also a keen sports player, was a Scottish champion in badminton. He received an honorary degree from Abertay University in 2012. Nevin's wife is the cousin of the retired English footballer Terry Butcher. Nevin has written and released two memoirs, The Accidental Footballer: A Memoir and Football and How to Survive It in 2021 and 2023, respectively.

== Career statistics ==
Appearances and goals by national team and year
National team	Year	Apps	Goals
Scotland	1986	3	0
Scotland	1987	3	0
Scotland	1989	2	0
Scotland	1990	2	0
Scotland	1991	1	0
Scotland	1992	3	1
Scotland	1993	5	3
Scotland	1994	5	0
Scotland	1995	3	1
Scotland	1996	1	0
Total		28	5

Scores and results list Scotland's goal tally first, score column indicates score after each Nevin goal.

List of international goals scored by Pat Nevin
No.	Date	Venue	Opponent	Score	Result	Competition
1	17 May 1992	Mile High Stadium, Denver, United States	United States	1–0	1–0	Friendly
2	17 February 1993	Ibrox Stadium, Glasgow, Scotland	Malta	3–0	3–0	1994 FIFA World Cup qualification
3	2 June 1993	Pittodrie Stadium, Aberdeen, Scotland	Estonia	2–0	3–1	1994 FIFA World Cup qualification
4	2 June 1993	Pittodrie Stadium, Aberdeen, Scotland	Estonia	3–1	3–1	1994 FIFA World Cup qualification
5	15 November 1995	Hampden Park, Glasgow, Scotland	San Marino	4–0	5–0	UEFA Euro 1996 qualification

== Honours ==
Clyde

- Scottish Second Division: 1981–82

Chelsea

- Football League Second Division: 1983–84
- Full Members' Cup: 1985–86

Everton

- FA Cup runner-up: 1988–89
- Full Members' Cup runner-up: 1988–89, 1990–91

Kilmarnock

- Ayrshire Cup: 1997–98

Scotland U18

- UEFA European Under-18 Championship: 1982

Scotland

- Rous Cup runner-up: 1986, 1989

Individual

- SPFA Second Division Player of the Year: 1981–82
- UEFA European Under-18 Championship Best Player: 1982
- Chelsea Player of the Year: 1983–84, 1986–87
- Tranmere Rovers Hall of Fame: 2010
- Gwladys Street's Hall of Fame: 2012
- Clyde Hall of Fame: 2012
