= 1981–82 Cardiff City F.C. season =

Welsh football club season

Cardiff City
1981–82 season
- Chairman: Bob Grogan
- Manager: Graham Williams/Len Ashurst
- Football League Second Division: 20th
- FA Cup: 3rd round
- League Cup: 1st round
- Welsh Cup: Runners-up
- Top goalscorer: League: Gary Stevens (13); All: Gary Stevens (18)
- Highest home attendance: 10,277 (v Luton, 17 May 1982)
- Lowest home attendance: 3,243 (v Cambridge United, 20 March 1982)
- Average home league attendance: 5,498
Home colours

The 1981–82 season was Cardiff City F.C.'s 55th season in the Football League. They competed in the 22-team Division Two, then the second tier of English football, finishing twentieth.

The season saw a two-tier management system at the club with former Wales international Graham Williams as team manager with Richie Morgan, who had been in charge of the team for the last three years, acting as general manager. However the system failed to produce results and, after just eleven league games, the pair were sacked and replaced by Len Ashurst.

== Players ==
Note: Flags indicate national team as defined under FIFA eligibility rules; some limited exceptions apply. Players may hold more than one non-FIFA nationality.

Pos.	Nation	Player
GK	WAL	Andy Dibble
GK	ENG	Peter Grotier
GK	ENG	Ron Healey
DF	ENG	Gary Bennett
DF	WAL	Phil Dwyer
DF	WAL	Peter Francombe
DF	ENG	Tim Gilbert
DF	ENG	Mick Henderson
DF	WAL	Dean Holtham
DF	WAL	Linden Jones
DF	ENG	Jimmy Mullen
DF	WAL	Keith Pontin
DF	ENG	Colin Sullivan
DF	WAL	Rod Thomas
MF	ENG	Dave Bennett

Pos.	Nation	Player
MF	SCO	John Buchanan
MF	WAL	Paul Giles
MF	ENG	Steve Grapes
MF	WAL	Doug Hatcher
MF	WAL	Wayne Hughes
MF	WAL	John Lewis
MF	WAL	Paul Maddy
MF	WAL	Tarki Micallef
MF	ENG	Andy Polycarpou
MF	ENG	Billy Ronson
MF	WAL	Alan Sanders
MF	WAL	Peter Sayer
FW	ENG	Peter Kitchen
FW	ENG	Gary Stevens
FW	ENG	Paul Sugrue

== League standings ==
Pos	Team	Pld	W	D	L	GF	GA	GD	Pts	Qualification or relegation
18	Shrewsbury Town	42	11	13	18	37	57	−20	46	
19	Bolton Wanderers	42	13	7	22	39	61	−22	46	
20	Cardiff City (R)	42	12	8	22	45	61	−16	44	Relegation to the Third Division
21	Wrexham (R)	42	11	11	20	40	56	−16	44	Relegation to the Third Division
22	Orient (R)	42	10	9	23	36	61	−25	39	Relegation to the Third Division

Rules for classification: 1) Points; 2) Goal difference; 3) Goals scored
(R) Relegated

=== Results by round ===
Round	1	2	3	4	5	6	7	8	9	10	11	12	13	14	15	16	17	18	19	20	21	22	23	24	25	26	27	28	29	30	31	32	33	34	35	36	37	38	39	40	41	42
Ground	A	H	A	H	A	A	H	A	H	H	A	H	H	A	H	A	A	H	H	H	A	H	A	A	H	H	A	A	A	H	A	H	H	H	A	A	H	A	A	H	A	H
Result	D	L	L	L	W	W	L	L	W	D	L	W	W	D	W	L	L	W	L	L	L	L	L	L	D	L	L	L	D	W	L	W	W	W	D	L	L	D	D	L	W	L
Position		19	20	20	18	17	20		19	19	19	19	12	16	11	12		11	12		17	20	20	20	20	20	20	21	21	21	21	18	17	14	15	16	19	19	19	20	20	20
Points	1	1	1	1	4	7	7	7	10	11	11	14	17	18	21	21	21	24	24	24	24	24	24	24	25	25	25	25	26	29	29	32	35	38	39	39	39	40	41	41	44	44

Source: Competitive matches
A = Away; H = Home; W = Win; D = Draw; L = Loss

== Fixtures and results ==
=== Second Division ===
29 August 1981 1	Oldham Athletic	2–2	Cardiff City	Oldham
15:00	Kenny Clements 2'; Roger Palmer 6'		12' Gary Stevens; 72' Phil Dwyer	Stadium: Boundary Park; Attendance: 4,393

5 September 1981 2	Cardiff City	1–2	Chelsea	Cardiff
15:00	Peter Kitchen 7'		27' Alan Mayes; 60' Alan Mayes	Stadium: Ninian Park; Attendance: 8,898; Referee: Derek Lloyd (Worcester)

12 September 1981 3	Rotherham United	1–0	Cardiff City	Rotherham
15:00	Ronnie Moore 89'			Stadium: Millmoor; Attendance: 7,197; Referee: Joe Worrall (Workington)

19 September 1981 4	Cardiff City	1–3	Blackburn Rovers	Cardiff
15:00	Billy Ronson 39'		11' Kevin Stonehouse; 29' (o.g.) Keith Pontin; 66' Kevin Stonehouse	Stadium: Ninian Park; Attendance: 4,253; Referee: Tony Glasson (Salisbury)

22 September 1981 5	Luton Town	2–3	Cardiff City	Luton
	Mick Saxby 44'; Raddy Antic 76'	Luton report	8' (pen.) Peter Kitchen; 31' Peter Sayer; 63' Gary Stevens	Stadium: Kenilworth Road; Attendance: 9,015; Referee: Ray Lewis (Great Bookham)

26 September 1981 6	Barnsley	0–1	Cardiff City	Barnsley
			65' Gary Stevens	Stadium: Oakwell; Attendance: 12,114

3 October 1981 7	Cardiff City	0–4	Newcastle United	Cardiff
15:00			9' Imre Varadi; 36' (pen.) Ian Davies; 56' Imre Varadi; 64' Imre Varadi	Stadium: Ninian Park; Attendance: 5,764; Referee: Ken Baker (Rugby)

10 October 1981 8	Sheffield Wednesday	2–1	Cardiff City	Sheffield
15:00	Kevin Taylor 65'; Andy McCulloch 84'		38' Dave Bennett	Stadium: Hillsborough; Attendance: 15,621

17 October 1981 9	Cardiff City	2–1	Bolton Wanderers	Cardiff
15:00	Gary Stevens 51'; Dave Bennett 54'		76' Len Cantello	Stadium: Ninian Park; Attendance: 3,879; Referee: Bert Newsome (Broseley Salop)

24 October 1981 10	Cardiff City	1–1	Shrewsbury Town	Cardiff
15:00	Gary Stevens 52'		81' (o.g.) Tim Gilbert	Stadium: Ninian Park; Attendance: 4,357; Referee: Brian Stevens (Stonehouse)

31 October 1981 11	Cambridge United	2–1	Cardiff City	Cambridge
15:00	Steve Spriggs 17'; Roger Gibbins 76'		52' Tarki Micallef	Stadium: Abbey Stadium; Attendance: 4,041; Referee: Colin Downey (Hounslow)

4 November 1981 12	Cardiff City	3–2	Wrexham	Cardiff
19:30	Tarki Micallef 41'; John Lewis 66'; Gary Stevens 68'	Wrexham report	37' (o.g.) Paul Maddy; 64' Frank Carrodus; (red card) 75' Phil Bater	Stadium: Ninian Park; Attendance: 4,625; Referee: Trevor Spencer (Wootton Bassett)

7 November 1981 13	Cardiff City	1–0	Norwich City	Cardiff
15:00	Dave Bennett 67'			Stadium: Ninian Park; Attendance: 5,704; Referee: Dennis Hedges (Oxford)

14 November 1981 14	Watford	0–0	Cardiff City	London
15:00				Stadium: Vicarage Road; Attendance: 13,907; Referee: BH Daniels (Rainham)

21 November 1981 15	Cardiff City	3–1	Leicester City	Cardiff
15:00	Tarki Micallef 72'; Dave Bennett 85'; Gary Stevens 88'		86' Peter Welsh	Stadium: Ninian Park; Attendance: 6,878; Referee: Alan Robinson (Fareham)

24 November 1981 16	Wrexham	3–1	Cardiff City	Wrexham
19:30	Simon Hunt 53'; Steve Buxton 65', 87'	Wrexham report	77' Phil Dwyer	Stadium: Racecourse; Attendance: 3,625; Referee: Keith Hackett (Sheffield)

28 November 1981 17	Queens Park Rangers	2–0	Cardiff City	London
15:00	Simon Stainrod 53'; Simon Stainrod 65'			Stadium: Loftus Road; Attendance: 10,225; Referee: Allan Gunn (Burgess Hill)

4 December 1981 18	Cardiff City	1–0	Derby County	Cardiff
19:30	Tarki Micallef 32'			Stadium: Ninian Park; Attendance: 5,515; Referee: Leslie Burden (Dorset)

28 December 1981 19	Cardiff City	0–1	Charlton Athletic	Cardiff
15:00			37' Derek Hales	Stadium: Ninian Park; Attendance: 7,887; Referee: Malcolm Heath (Stoke)

20 January 1982 20	Cardiff City	0–1	Oldham Athletic	Cardiff
19:30			74' Roger Palmer	Stadium: Ninian Park; Attendance: 4,112; Referee: David Letts (Basingstoke)

30 January 1982 21	Blackburn Rovers	1–0	Cardiff City	Blackburn
15:00	Simon Garner 89'			Stadium: Ewood Park; Attendance: 7,001; Referee: Ron Bridges (Deeside)

6 February 1982 22	Cardiff City	1–2	Rotherham United	Cardiff
15:00	Peter Kitchen		43' Gerry Gow; 52' Rodney Fern	Stadium: Ninian Park; Attendance: 3,800; Referee: Tom Bune (Sussex)

13 February 1982 23	Newcastle United	2–1	Cardiff City	Newcastle
	John Trewick 8'; Imre Varadi 36'		30' Gary Stevens	Stadium: St James' Park; Attendance: 15,409; Referee: John Key (Rotherham)

17 February 1982 24	Chelsea	1–0	Cardiff City	London
15:00	Clive Walker 63'			Stadium: Stamford Bridge; Attendance: 9,710; Referee: Martin Bodenham (East Looe)

20 February 1982 25	Cardiff City	0–0	Barnsley	Cardiff
15:00				Stadium: Ninian Park; Attendance: 4,503; Referee: Alex Hamil (Wolverhampton)

27 February 1982 26	Cardiff City	0–2	Sheffield Wednesday	Cardiff
15:00			18' (pen.) Gary Bannister; 44' Kevin Taylor	Stadium: Ninian Park; Attendance: 5,674; Referee: Roger Milford (Bristol)

6 March 1982 27	Bolton Wanderers	1–0	Cardiff City	Bolton
15:00	Paul Jones 85' (pen.)			Stadium: Burnden Park; Attendance: 6,269; Referee: Ken Baker (Rugby)

9 March 1982 28	Crystal Palace	1–0	Cardiff City	London
15:00	Tommy Langley 60'			Stadium: Selhurst Park; Attendance: 6,526

13 March 1982 29	Shrewsbury Town	1–1	Cardiff City	Shrewsbury
	John Dungworth 61'		81' Gary Bennett	Stadium: Gay Meadow; Attendance: 4,089; Referee: Arnold Challinor

20 March 1982 30	Cardiff City	5–4	Cambridge United	Cardiff
11:00	Gary Stevens 24'; Peter Kitchen 26'; Gary Stevens 29'; Gary Stevens 39'; Peter Kitchen 43'		15' George Reilly; 38' Roger Gibbins; 68' Steve Fallon; 89' Floyd Streete	Stadium: Ninian Park; Attendance: 3,243; Referee: Lester Shapter (Paignton)

27 March 1982 31	Norwich City	2–1	Cardiff City	Norwich
15:00	Ross Jack 60'; Keith Bertschin 80'		79' Tim Gilbert	Stadium: Carrow Road; Attendance: 12,720; Referee: Darryl Reeves (Uxbridge)

30 March 1982 32	Cardiff City	2–1	Grimsby Town	Cardiff
19:30	Gary Stevens 5'; Trevor Whymark 15' (pen.)		43' (o.g.) David Moore	Stadium: Ninian Park; Attendance: 3,924; Referee: Derek Civil (Birmingham)

3 April 1982 33	Cardiff City	2–0	Watford	Cardiff
15:00	Dave Bennett 62'; Tarki Micallef 85'			Stadium: Ninian Park; Attendance: 6,734; Referee: Keren Barratt

10 April 1982 34	Cardiff City	2–1	Orient	Cardiff
15:00	Dave Bennett 3'; Peter Kitchen 75'		38' Colin Foster	Stadium: Ninian Park; Attendance: 5,689; Referee: LM Robinson

13 April 1982 35	Charlton Athletic	2–2	Cardiff City	London
19:45	Kevin Smith 18'; Billy Lansdowne 40'		46' Gary Stevens; 89' Jimmy Mullen	Stadium: The Valley; Attendance: 4,186; Referee: John Deakin (Bedford)

17 April 1982 36	Leicester City	3–1	Cardiff City	Leicester
15:00	Gary Lineker 1'; Steve Lynex 50'; Gary Lineker 78'		40' Peter Kitchen	Stadium: Filbert Street; Attendance: 13,650

24 April 1982 37	Cardiff City	1–2	Queens Park Rangers	Cardiff
15:00	Tarki Micallef 39'		3' Clive Allen; 24' John Gregory	Stadium: Ninian Park; Attendance: 3,979; Referee: V Bellow

28 April 1982 38	Orient	1–1	Cardiff City	London
20:00	Colin Foster		46' Paul Maddy	Stadium: Brisbane Road; Attendance: 2,527

1 May 1982 39	Derby County	0–0	Cardiff City	Derby
15:00				Attendance: 10,111; Referee: Bob Nixon (West Kirby)

8 May 1982 40	Cardiff City	0–1	Crystal Palace	Cardiff
15:00			Kevin Mabbutt	Stadium: Ninian Park; Attendance: 5,762; Referee: Brian Hill

15 May 1982 41	Grimsby Town	0–1	Cardiff City	Grimsby
15:00			82' Tarki Micallef	Stadium: Blundell Park; Attendance: 8,748

17 May 1982 42	Cardiff City	2–3	Luton Town	Cardiff
19:30	Peter Kitchen 83'; Tarki Micallef 87'	Luton report	22', 81' Brian Stein; 72' Mal Donaghy	Stadium: Ninian Park; Attendance: 10,277; Referee: Alan Robinson (Fareham)

=== League Cup ===
2 September 1981 Round 1 (First Leg)	Cardiff City	2–1	Exeter City	Cardiff
19:30	Gary Stevens 43', 74'		73' Joe Cooke	Stadium: Ninian Park; Attendance: 2,608; Referee: R Baker (Wolverhampton)

15 September 1981 Round 1 (Second Leg)	Exeter City	3 – 1 (a.e.t.)	Cardiff City	Exeter
19:30	Tony Kellow 16' (pen.); Phil Fisher 59'; Joe Cooke		13' Paul Sugrue	Stadium: St James Park; Attendance: 4,449; Referee: John Martin

=== FA Cup ===
2 January 1982 Round 3	Manchester City	3–1	Cardiff City	Manchester
15:00	Trevor Francis 22'; Bobby McDonald 44'; Trevor Francis 70'		40' Paul Maddy	Stadium: Maine Road; Attendance: 31,547; Referee: Brian Hill (Kettering)

=== Welsh Cup ===
6 December 1981 Round 3	Bridgend Town	1–4	Cardiff City	Bridgend
	Gary Bennett (o.g.)		37', 43' Tarki Micallef; John Lewis; 90' Paul Sugrue	Stadium: Coychurch Road; Attendance: 1,000; Referee: Keith Cooper (Pontypridd)

15 December 1981 Round 4	Cardiff City	3–1	Newport County	Cardiff
19:30	Dave Bennett 43'; Phil Dwyer 63'; Gary Stevens 90'		27' Keith Oakes	Stadium: Ninian Park; Attendance: 3,915; Referee: Howard King (Merthyr Tydfil)

9 February 1982 Round 5	Cardiff City	4–1	Wrexham	Cardiff
19:30	Gary Stevens 13'; Peter Kitchen 24', 48', 67'	Wrexham report	89' Billy Ronson	Stadium: Ninian Park; Attendance: 2,767; Referee: GP Owen (Anglesey)

8 April 1982 Semi Final (First leg)	Hereford United	0–0	Cardiff City	Hereford
				Stadium: Edgar Street; Attendance: 4,832; Referee: Howard King (Merthyr Tydfil)

19 April 1982 Semi Final (Second leg)	Cardiff City	2–1 (2–1 agg.)	Hereford United	Cardiff
19:30	Tarki Micallef; Gary Stevens 44'		Stewart Phillips	Stadium: Ninian Park; Attendance: 3,635

11 May 1982 Final (First leg)	Cardiff City	0–0	Swansea City	Cardiff
19:45				Stadium: Ninian Park; Attendance: 11,960; Referee: Gwyn Owen (Anglesey)

19 May 1982 Final (Second leg)	Swansea City	2–1 (2–1 agg.)	Cardiff City	Swansea
	Bob Latchford 7', 19'; Ante Rajković (yellow card) (yellow-red card) 69'		3' Gary Bennett	Stadium: Vetch Field; Attendance: 15,828; Referee: Gwyn Owen (Anglesey)

== See also ==
- Cardiff City F.C. seasons

== Bibliography ==
- Hayes, Dean (2006). The Who's Who of Cardiff City. Breedon Books. ISBN 1-85983-462-0.
- Crooks, John (1986). Cardiff City Chronology 1920-86. John Crooks. ISBN 0-9511984-0-8.
- Shepherd, Richard (2002). The Definitive Cardiff City F.C. Tony Brown. ISBN 1-899-46817-X.
- Crooks, John (1992). Cardiff City Football Club: Official History of the Bluebirds. Yore Publications. ISBN 0-9513321-8-X.
- "Football Club History Database – Cardiff City". Archived from the original on 30 December 2008.
- Welsh Football Data Archive
