= 1986–87 UEFA Cup =

16th season of Europe's secondary club football tournament organised by UEFA

Tournament details
- Dates: 16 September 1986 – 20 May 1987
- Teams: 64

Final positions
- Champions: (Sweden) IFK Göteborg (2nd title)
- Runners-up: (Scotland) Dundee United

Tournament statistics
- Matches played: 126
- Goals scored: 291 (2.31 per match)
- Attendance: 2,502,655 (19,862 per match)
- Top scorer(s): Peter Houtman (Groningen); Paulinho Cascavel (Vitória Guimarães); Jari Rantanen (IFK Göteborg); Wim Kieft (Torino); 5 goals each

The 1986–87 UEFA Cup was the 16th season of the UEFA Cup, the third-tier club football competition organised by the Union of European Football Associations (UEFA). The final was played over two legs at the Ullevi, Gothenburg, Sweden, and at Tannadice Park, Dundee, Scotland. The competition was won by IFK Göteborg of Sweden, who defeated Dundee United of Scotland by an aggregate result of 2–1 to claim their second title.

This is the second and last European tournament won by a Swedish team, five years after Göteborg's first UEFA Cup conquest in 1982, as well as the last European final played by a Swedish team, while Dundee United became the last team from Scotland to reach a European final until 2003. This was the second season in which all English clubs were banned from European football competitions.

== Association team allocation ==
A total of 64 teams from 31 UEFA member associations participated in the 1986–87 UEFA Cup, all entering from the first round over six knock-out rounds. The association ranking based on the UEFA country coefficients is used to determine the number of participating teams for each association:

- Associations 1–3 each have four teams qualify.
- Associations 4–8 each have three teams qualify.
- Associations 9–21 each have two teams qualify.
- Associations 22–32 each have one team qualify.

Due to the ongoing English ban, their four berths were allocated to associations 9–12, each gaining a third berth.

=== Association ranking ===
For the 1986–87 UEFA Cup, the associations are allocated places according to their 1985 UEFA country coefficients, which takes into account their performance in European competitions from 1980–81 to 1984–85.

Association ranking for 1986–87 UEFA Cup

Rank	Association	Coeff.	Teams	Notes
1	England	41.093	0	
2	Italy	38.800	4	
3	West Germany	37.070	4	
4	Soviet Union	33.916	3	
5	Belgium	33.266	3	
6	Scotland	30.400	3	
7	Portugal	30.250	3	
8	Spain	29.366	3	
9	(Socialist Federal Republic of Yugoslavia) Yugoslavia	27.550	3	
10	Czechoslovakia	23.550	3	
11	France	22.750	3	
12	East Germany	22.600	3	
13	Austria	22.500	2	
14	Netherlands	20.049	2	
15	Romania	19.916	2	
16	Switzerland	18.500	2	
17	Bulgaria	17.250	2	

Rank	Association	Coeff.	Teams	Notes
18	Sweden	17.250	2	
-	Wales	17.000	0	
19	Greece	16.916	2	
20	Hungary	16.750	2	
21	Poland	14.750	2	
22	Denmark	9.249	1	
23	(Republic of Ireland) Republic of Ireland	6.332	1	
24	Albania	6.000	1	
25	Norway	5.999	1	
26	Turkey	5.333	1	
27	Finland	5.331	1	
28	(Northern Ireland) Northern Ireland	4.998	1	
29	Cyprus	4.665	1	
30	Malta	1.999	1	
31	Iceland	1.998	1	
32	Luxembourg	1.332	1	

England: Since the Heysel Stadium disaster in 1985, all English football clubs were placed under an indefinite ban by Union of European Football Associations (UEFA) from all European competitions, which would be lifted in 1990–91. As England was first in the UEFA rankings, each of their four allocated UEFA Cup berths for 1986–87 were transferred as a third berth for associations 9–12, namely Yugoslavia, Czechoslovakia, France and East Germany. West Ham United, Manchester United and Sheffield Wednesday would have qualified by league position, while Oxford United would have qualified by winning the 1985-86 League Cup.
Wales: There was no national league in Wales before 1992 and the only competition organised by the Football Association of Wales was the Welsh Cup so Wales had just a single participant in European competitions, the winner (or best placed Welsh team as several English teams also competed) of the Welsh Cup which competed in the UEFA Cup Winners' Cup. Its virtual ranking is only an original research, because the UEFA country ranking was only used to allocate the UEFA Cup spots at time, so Wales was not included.

=== Teams ===
The labels in parentheses show how each team qualified for competition:

- TH: Title holders
- CW: Cup winners
- CR: Cup runners-up
- LC: League Cup winners
- 2nd, 3rd, 4th, 5th, 6th, etc.: League position
- P-W: End-of-season European competition play-offs winners

Qualified teams for 1986–87 UEFA Cup
(Italy) Napoli (3rd)	(Italy) Torino (4th)	(Italy) Fiorentina (5th)	(Italy) Internazionale (6th)
(West Germany) Werder Bremen (2nd)	(West Germany) Bayer Uerdingen (3rd)	(West Germany) Borussia Mönchengladbach (4th)	(West Germany) Bayer Leverkusen (6th)
(Soviet Union) Spartak Moscow (2nd)	(Soviet Union) Dnipro Dnipropetrovsk (3rd)	(Soviet Union) Dinamo Minsk (4th)	(Belgium) Standard Liège (3rd)
(Belgium) Gent (4th)	(Belgium) Beveren (5th)	(Scotland) Heart of Midlothian (2nd)	(Scotland) Dundee United (3rd)
(Scotland) Rangers (5th)	(Portugal) Sporting CP (3rd)	(Portugal) Vitória de Guimarães (4th)	(Portugal) Boavista (5th)
(Spain) Barcelona (2nd)	(Spain) Athletic Bilbao (3rd)	(Spain) Atlético Madrid (5th)	(Socialist Federal Republic of Yugoslavia) Partizan (1st)
(Socialist Federal Republic of Yugoslavia) Rijeka (4th)	(Socialist Federal Republic of Yugoslavia) Hajduk Split (5th)	(Czechoslovakia) Sparta Prague (2nd)	(Czechoslovakia) Dukla Prague (3rd)
(Czechoslovakia) Sigma Olomouc (4th)	(France) Nantes (2nd)	(France) Toulouse (4th)	(France) Lens (5th)
(East Germany) Carl Zeiss Jena (3rd)	(East Germany) Magdeburg (4th)	(East Germany) Stahl Brandenburg (5th)	(Austria) Swarovski Tirol (3rd)
(Austria) LASK (4th)	(Netherlands) Feyenoord (3rd)	(Netherlands) Groningen (4th)	(Romania) Sportul Studențesc (2nd)
(Romania) Universitatea Craiova (3rd)	(Switzerland) Neuchâtel Xamax (2nd)	(Switzerland) Luzern (3rd)	(Bulgaria) Trakia Plovdiv (2nd)
(Bulgaria) Sredets Sofia (LC)	(Sweden) IFK Göteborg (2nd)	(Sweden) Kalmar (4th)	(Greece) OFI (2nd)
(Greece) AEK Athens (3rd)	(Hungary) Pécs (2nd)	(Hungary) Győri ETO (3rd)	(Poland) Legia Warsaw (2nd)
(Poland) Widzew Łódź (3rd)	(Denmark) Lyngby (2nd)	(Republic of Ireland) Galway United (2nd)	(Albania) Flamurtari (2nd)
(Norway) Vålerenga (3rd)	(Turkey) Galatasaray (2nd)	(Finland) Ilves (2nd)	(Northern Ireland) Coleraine (2nd)
(Cyprus) Omonia (2nd)	(Malta) Hibernians (2nd)	(Iceland) ÍA (2nd)	(Luxembourg) Jeunesse Esch (2nd)

Notes

1. Yugoslavia: Partizan was crowned champion of the 1985-86 Yugoslav First League on a tie-breaker with Red Star Belgrade, but the Football Association of Yugoslavia voided all results of the last matchday of the season and ordered a full replay, due to allegations of match fixing over multiple games. Partizan elected to not replay their final game, and Red Star Belgrade was crowned champion instead, with Partizan qualifying for the UEFA Cup in 2nd place. After an appeal by Partizan, the Yugoslav Constitutional Court reversed the decision on 29 July 1987, reinstating Partizan as champions.
2. Austria: Wacker Innsbruck qualified for the UEFA Cup, but its licence in the Austrian Football Bundesliga was taken by FC Swarovski Tirol, as Wacker Innsbruck fell to the eighth division of Austrian football. While considered a new team, Swarovski Tirol retained the UEFA Cup placing.

== Schedule ==
The schedule of the competition was as follows. Matches were scheduled for Wednesdays, though some matches exceptionally took place on Tuesdays or Thursdays. The semi-finals reverted to being played in the same days, and the two-legged final again had a two week interval.

Schedule for 1986–87 UEFA Cup
Round	First leg	Second leg
First round	16–18 September 1986	30 September – 2 October 1986
Second round	22–23 October 1986	4–5 November 1986
Third round	26 November 1986	10–17 December 1986
Quarter-finals	4 March 1987	18 March 1987
Semi-finals	8 April 1987	22 April 1987
Final	6 May 1987	20 May 1987

== First round ==
Team 1	Agg.	Team 2	1st leg	2nd leg
Sparta Prague (Czechoslovakia)	2–3	(Portugal) Vitória de Guimarães	1–1	1–2
Fiorentina (Italy)	1–1 (1–3 p)	(Portugal) Boavista	1–0	0–1 (a.e.t.)
Athletic Bilbao (Spain)	2–1	(East Germany) 1. FC Magdeburg	2–0	0–1
Atlético Madrid (Spain)	3–2	(West Germany) Werder Bremen	2–0	1–2 (a.e.t.)
Borussia Mönchengladbach (West Germany)	4–1	(Socialist Federal Republic of Yugoslavia) Partizan	1–0	3–1
Coleraine (Northern Ireland)	1–2	(East Germany) Stahl Brandenburg	1–1	0–1
Dinamo Minsk (Soviet Union)	3–4	(Hungary) Győri ETO	2–4	1–0
Groningen (Netherlands)	8–2	(Republic of Ireland) Galway United	5–1	3–1
Nantes (France)	1–5	(Italy) Torino	0–4	1–1
Spartak Moscow (Soviet Union)	1–0	(Switzerland) Luzern	0–0	1–0
Universitatea Craiova (Romania)	3–2	(Turkey) Galatasaray	2–0	1–2
Swarovski Tirol (Austria)	3–2	(Bulgaria) Sredets Sofia	3–0	0–2
Heart of Midlothian (Scotland)	3–3 (a)	(Czechoslovakia) Dukla Prague	3–2	0–1
Hibernians (Malta)	0–10	(Bulgaria) Trakia Plovdiv	0–2	0–8
Internazionale (Italy)	3–0	(Greece) AEK Athens	2–0	1–0
ÍA (Iceland)	0–15	(Portugal) Sporting CP	0–9	0–6
Jeunesse Esch (Luxembourg)	2–3	(Belgium) Gent	1–2	1–1
Beveren (Belgium)	1–0	(Norway) Vålerenga	1–0	0–0
Kalmar (Sweden)	1–7	(West Germany) Bayer Leverkusen	1–4	0–3
Bayer 05 Uerdingen (West Germany)	7–0	(East Germany) Carl Zeiss Jena	3–0	4–0
Flamurtari (Albania)	1–1 (a)	(Spain) Barcelona	1–1	0–0
LASK (Austria)	1–2	(Poland) Widzew Łódź	1–1	0–1
Legia Warsaw (Poland)	1–0	(Soviet Union) Dnepr Dnepropetrovsk	0–0	1–0
Napoli (Italy)	1–1 (3–4 p)	(France) Toulouse	1–0	0–1 (a.e.t.)
Neuchâtel Xamax (Switzerland)	5–1	(Denmark) Lyngby	2–0	3–1
Rijeka (Socialist Federal Republic of Yugoslavia)	1–2	(Belgium) Standard Liège	0–1	1–1
OFI (Greece)	1–4	(Socialist Federal Republic of Yugoslavia) Hajduk Split	1–0	0–4
Pécs (Hungary)	1–2	(Netherlands) Feyenoord	1–0	0–2
Rangers (Scotland)	4–2	(Finland) Ilves	4–0	0–2
Lens (France)	1–2	(Scotland) Dundee United	1–0	0–2
Sigma Olomouc (Czechoslovakia)	1–5	(Sweden) IFK Göteborg	1–1	0–4
Sportul Studențesc (Romania)	2–1	(Cyprus) Omonia	1–0	1–1

=== First leg ===
16 September 1986
19:30

Jeunesse Esch (Luxembourg)	1–2	(Belgium) Gent
Scholten 48'	Report	Nollet 36'; Van Looy 78'

Stade de la Frontière, Esch-sur-Alzette
Attendance: 2,700
Referee: Georges Sandoz (Switzerland)

16 September 1986
20:00

Groningen (Netherlands)	5–1	(Republic of Ireland) Galway United
Eijkelkamp 4'; Houtman 48', 57', 70'; Mason 69'	Report	McGee 37' (pen.)

Stadion Oosterpark, Groningen
Attendance: 12,641
Referee: Jean-Pierre Schön (Luxembourg)

16 September 1986
20:00

Neuchâtel Xamax (Switzerland)	2–0	(Denmark) Lyngby
Jacobacci 29'; Stielike 82'	Report

Stade de la Maladière, Neuchâtel
Attendance: 8,200
Referee: José Guedes (Portugal)

16 September 1986
20:15

Borussia Mönchengladbach (West Germany)	1–0	(Socialist Federal Republic of Yugoslavia) Partizan
Krauss 24'	Report

Bökelbergstadion, Mönchengladbach
Attendance: 5,300
Referee: Lajos Németh (Hungary)

17 September 1986
14:30

Hibernians (Malta)	0–2	(Bulgaria) Trakia Plovdiv
	Report	Bakalov 6', 40'

National Stadium, Ta' Qali
Attendance: 3,652
Referee: Christos Kolokythas (Greece)

17 September 1986
15:30

Pécs (Hungary)	1–0	(Netherlands) Feyenoord
Mészáros 26'	Report

PMSC Stadion, Pécs
Attendance: 12,874
Referee: Antonios Vassaras (Greece)

17 September 1986
15:30

Sigma Olomouc (Czechoslovakia)	1–1	(Sweden) IFK Göteborg
Mlejnek 32'	Report	Johansson 66'

Stadion Míru, Olomouc
Attendance: 6,000
Referee: İhsan Türe (Turkey)

17 September 1986
16:00

OFI (Greece)	1–0	(Socialist Federal Republic of Yugoslavia) Hajduk Split
Vlastos 22'	Report

Theodoros Vardinogiannis Stadium, Heraklion
Attendance: 5,187
Referee: Adolf Prokop (East Germany)

17 September 1986
16:00

Sportul Studențesc (Romania)	1–0	(Cyprus) Omonia
Hagi 58'	Report

Stadionul Regie, Bucharest
Attendance: 4,500
Referee: Michał Listkiewicz (Poland)

17 September 1986
16:00

Universitatea Craiova (Romania)	2–0	(Turkey) Galatasaray
Geolgău 57'; Bâcu 86'	Report

Stadionul Central, Craiova
Attendance: 16,000
Referee: Dieter Pauly (West Germany)

17 September 1986
16:30

Flamurtari (Albania)	1–1	(Spain) Barcelona
V. Ruci 65'	Report	Esteban 88'

Flamurtari Stadium, Vlorë
Attendance: 12,000
Referee: Charles Scerri (Malta)

17 September 1986
17:00

Coleraine (Northern Ireland)	1–1	(East Germany) Stahl Brandenburg
Healy 78' (pen.)	Report	Janotta 50'

The Showgrounds, Coleraine
Attendance: 1,100
Referee: Charles Gilson (Luxembourg)

17 September 1986
17:00

Spartak Moscow (Soviet Union)	0–0	(Switzerland) Luzern
	Report

Central Lenin Stadium, Moscow
Attendance: 38,000
Referee: Aron Schmidhuber (West Germany)

17 September 1986
17:30

Legia Warsaw (Poland)	0–0	(Soviet Union) Dnepr Dnepropetrovsk
	Report

Stadion Wojska Polskiego, Warsaw
Attendance: 12,000
Referee: Ion Crăciunescu (Romania)

17 September 1986
17:30

Sparta Prague (Czechoslovakia)	1–1	(Portugal) Vitória de Guimarães
Skuhravý 61'	Report	Roldão 80'

Stadion Letná, Prague
Attendance: 10,010
Referee: Neil Midgley (England)

17 September 1986
18:00

Dinamo Minsk (Soviet Union)	2–4	(Hungary) Győri ETO
Zygmantovich 45'; Kondratiev 50'	Report	Hajszán 19'; Szabó 44', 80'; Szentes 63'

Dinamo Stadium, Minsk
Attendance: 23,127
Referee: Velichko Tsonchev (Bulgaria)

17 September 1986
19:00

LASK (Austria)	1–1	(Poland) Widzew Łódź
Dantlinger 32'	Report	Wraga 7'

Linzer Stadion, Linz
Attendance: 3,920
Referee: Borislav Aleksandrov (Bulgaria)

17 September 1986
19:45

ÍA (Iceland)	0–9	(Portugal) Sporting CP
	Report	Manuel Fernandes 10', 39' (pen.); Meade 14', 37'; McDonald 49', 60', 86'; Negrete 64'; Zinho 90' (pen.)

Laugardalsvöllur, Reykjavík
Attendance: 1,518
Referee: John Lloyd (Wales)

17 September 1986
20:00

Bayer 05 Uerdingen (West Germany)	3–0	(East Germany) Carl Zeiss Jena
Bierhoff 36'; F. Funkel 43'; Bommer 74' (pen.)	Report

Grotenburg-Stadion, Krefeld
Attendance: 11,000
Referee: George Smith (Scotland)

17 September 1986
21:00

Kalmar (Sweden)	1–4	(West Germany) Bayer Leverkusen
Nilsson 66'	Report	Schreier 8'; Schreier 18'; Cha 57'; Kohn 62'

Fredriksskans Idrottsplats, Kalmar
Attendance: 1,911
Referee: Yuriy Shevchenko (Soviet Union)

17 September 1986
20:00

Beveren (Belgium)	1–0	(Norway) Vålerenga
Fairclough 75'	Report

Freethielstadion, Beveren
Attendance: 2,800
Referee: Oliver Donnelly (Northern Ireland)

17 September 1986
20:00

Rijeka (Socialist Federal Republic of Yugoslavia)	0–1	(Belgium) Standard Liège
	Report	Claesen 25'

Stadion Kantrida, Rijeka
Attendance: 7,000
Referee: Ignace van Swieten (Netherlands)

17 September 1986
20:15

Athletic Bilbao (Spain)	2–0	(East Germany) 1. FC Magdeburg
Gallego 56'; Pizo Gómez 61'	Report

Estadio San Mamés, Bilbao
Attendance: 17,000
Referee: Pietro D'Elia (Italy)

17 September 1986
20:30

Fiorentina (Italy)	1–0	(Portugal) Boavista
Pin 32'	Report

Stadio Comunale, Florence
Attendance: 34,217
Referee: Horst Brummeier (Austria)

17 September 1986
20:30

Heart of Midlothian (Scotland)	3–2	(Czechoslovakia) Dukla Prague
Foster 1'; Clark 65'; Robertson 70'	Report	Fitzel 44'; Klucký 64'

Tynecastle Park, Edinburgh
Attendance: 18,869
Referee: André Van Volcem (Belgium)

17 September 1986
20:30

Internazionale (Italy)	2–0	(Greece) AEK Athens
Altobelli 58'; Rummenigge 79'	Report

San Siro, Milan
Attendance: 49,055
Referee: Marcel Van Langenhove (Belgium)

17 September 1986
20:30

Nantes (France)	0–4	(Italy) Torino
	Report	Comi 54'; Beruatto 61'; Kieft 82', 89'

Stade de la Beaujoire, Nantes
Attendance: 14,658
Referee: David Syme (Scotland)

17 September 1986
20:30

Napoli (Italy)	1–0	(France) Toulouse
Carnevale 55'	Report

Stadio San Paolo, Naples
Attendance: 73,875
Referee: Karl-Heinz Tritschler (West Germany)

17 September 1986
20:30

Rangers (Scotland)	4–0	(Finland) Ilves
Fleck 30', 44', 52'; McCoist 70'	Report

Ibrox Park, Glasgow
Attendance: 27,436
Referee: Jan Damgaard (Denmark)

17 September 1986
20:30

Lens (France)	1–0	(Scotland) Dundee United
Carreño 42'	Report

Stade Félix-Bollaert, Lens
Attendance: 11,330
Referee: Gerald Losert (Austria)

17 September 1986
21:00

Atlético Madrid (Spain)	2–0	(West Germany) Werder Bremen
Uralde 48'; Arteche 71'	Report

Estadio Vicente Calderón, Madrid
Attendance: 38,000
Referee: Bruno Galler (Switzerland)

18 September 1986
20:00

Swarovski Tirol (Austria)	3–0	(Bulgaria) Sredets Sofia
Roscher 11'; Pacult 46'; Linzmaier 77'	Report

Tivoli-Stadion, Innsbruck
Attendance: 10,000
Referee: Carlo Longhi (Italy)

=== Second leg ===
30 September 1986
19:00

Vålerenga (Norway)	0–0	(Belgium) Beveren
	Report

Bislett stadion, Oslo
Attendance: 3,000
Referee: Simo Ruokonen (Finland)

Beveren won 1–0 on aggregate.

30 September 1986
19:00

Sredets Sofia (Bulgaria)	2–0	(Austria) Swarovski Tirol
Tanev 35' (pen.); Kostadinov 80'	Report

Vasil Levski National Stadium, Sofia
Attendance: 20,000
Referee: Franz Gächter (Switzerland)

Swarovski Tirol won 3–2 on aggregate.

1 October 1986
13:45

Galatasaray (Turkey)	2–1	(Romania) Universitatea Craiova
Cüneyt 65'; Yusuf 88'	Report	Biță 1'

Ali Sami Yen Stadium, Istanbul
Attendance: 31,035
Referee: Rosario Lo Bello (Italy)

Universitatea Craiova won 3–2 on aggregate.

1 October 1986
14:00

Trakia Plovdiv (Bulgaria)	8–0	(Malta) Hibernians
Simov 5' (pen.); Pehlivanov 10', 14'; Pashev 30'; Kurdov 49'; Georgiev 54'; Bakalov 57'; Mladenov 80'	Report

Stadion Hristo Botev, Plovdiv
Attendance: 6,000
Referee: Hiqmet Kuka (Albania)

Trakia Plovdiv won 10–0 on aggregate.

1 October 1986
14:30

Stahl Brandenburg (East Germany)	1–0	(Northern Ireland) Coleraine
Jeske 41'	Report

Stadion der Stahlwerker, Brandenburg an der Havel
Attendance: 15,050
Referee: Kaj Natri (Finland)

Stahl Brandenburg won 2–1 on aggregate.

1 October 1986
16:00

Partizan (Socialist Federal Republic of Yugoslavia)	1–3	(West Germany) Borussia Mönchengladbach
Vučićević 47'	Report	Dreßen 27'; Brandts 82'; Lienen 85'

Stadion JNA, Belgrade
Attendance: 42,000
Referee: Robert Wurtz (France)

Borussia Mönchengladbach won 4–1 on aggregate.

1 October 1986
16:30

Vitória de Guimarães (Portugal)	2–1	(Czechoslovakia) Sparta Prague
Cascavel 75', 87'	Report	Novák 55'

Estádio D. Afonso Henriques, Guimarães
Attendance: 16,000
Referee: Jean-Marie Lartigot (France)

Vitória de Guimarães won 3–2 on aggregate.

1 October 1986
16:30

Győri ETO (Hungary)	0–1	(Soviet Union) Dinamo Minsk
	Report	Rodnenok 15'

Stadion ETO, Győr
Attendance: 16,000
Referee: Zoran Petrović (Yugoslavia)

Győri ETO won 4–3 on aggregate.

1 October 1986
16:30

Galway United (Republic of Ireland)	1–3	(Netherlands) Groningen
Murphy 63'	Report	Houtman 22', 56' de Kock 36'

Páirc an Chathánaigh, Carraroe
Attendance: 1,580
Referee: Claude Bouillet (France)

Groningen won 8–2 on aggregate.

1 October 1986
16:30

Dukla Prague (Czechoslovakia)	1–0	(Scotland) Heart of Midlothian
Griga 54'	Report

Stadion Juliska, Prague
Attendance: 2,231
Referee: Helmut Kohl (Austria)

3–3 on aggregate; Dukla Prague won on away goals.

1 October 1986
18:00

Widzew Łódź (Poland)	1–0	(Austria) LASK
Wraga 56'	Report

Stadion Widzewa, Łódź
Attendance: 8,550
Referee: James Duncan (Scotland)

Widzew Łódź won 2–1 on aggregate.

1 October 1986
18:00

Dnepr Dnepropetrovsk (Soviet Union)	0–1	(Poland) Legia Warsaw
	Report	Araszkiewicz 78'

Stadion Metalurh, Kryvyi Rih (Note: Dnipro Dnipropetrovsk played their home matches at Stadion Metalurh, Kryvyi Rih, instead of their regular stadium Meteor Stadium, Dnipropetrovsk, as Dnipropetrovsk was a closed city for foreigners.)
Attendance: 24,600
Referee: Antal Hutak (Hungary)

Legia Warsaw won 1–0 on aggregate.

1 October 1986
18:00

Hajduk Split (Socialist Federal Republic of Yugoslavia)	4–0	(Greece) OFI
Jerolimov 4'; Bursać 36', 50'; Deverić 47'	Report

Stadion Poljud, Split
Attendance: 8,112
Referee: Dušan Krchňák (Czechoslovakia)

Hajduk Split won 4–1 on aggregate.

1 October 1986
18:00

Ilves (Finland)	2–0	(Scotland) Rangers
Hjelm 54'; Uimonen 73'	Report

Tampere Stadium, Tampere
Attendance: 2,109
Referee: Ivan Gregr (Czechoslovakia)

Rangers won 4–2 on aggregate.

1 October 1986
19:00

Lyngby (Denmark)	1–3	(Switzerland) Neuchâtel Xamax
Jørgensen 72'	Report	Jacobacci 2'; Lüthi 38', 44'

Lyngby Stadium, Kongens Lyngby
Attendance: 4,062
Referee: Klaus Peschel (East Germany)

Neuchâtel Xamax won 5–1 on aggregate.

1 October 1986
19:00

IFK Göteborg (Sweden)	4–0	(Czechoslovakia) Sigma Olomouc
Rantanen 13'; Andersson 40'; Ekström 85', 87'	Report

Ullevi, Gothenburg
Attendance: 11,167
Referee: Howard King (Wales)

IFK Göteborg won 5–1 on aggregate.

1 October 1986
19:30

Bayer Leverkusen (West Germany)	3–0	(Sweden) Kalmar
Drews 62'; Rolff 64'; Cha 90'	Report

Ulrich-Haberland-Stadion, Leverkusen
Attendance: 9,960
Referee: Ron Bridges (Wales)

Bayer Leverkusen won 7–1 on aggregate.

1 October 1986
20:00

1. FC Magdeburg (East Germany)	1–0	(Spain) Athletic Bilbao
Windelband 33'	Report

Ernst-Grube-Stadion, Magdeburg
Attendance: 22,000
Referee: Gérard Biguet (France)

Athletic Bilbao won 2–1 on aggregate.

1 October 1986
20:00

Werder Bremen (West Germany)	2–1 (a.e.t.)	(Spain) Atlético Madrid
Neubarth 65'; Meier 83'	Report	Salinas 113'

Weserstadion, Bremen
Attendance: 30,800
Referee: Alain Delmer (France)

Atlético Madrid won 3–2 on aggregate.

1 October 1986
20:00

Gent (Belgium)	1–1	(Luxembourg) Jeunesse Esch
Hinderyckx 53'	Report	Guillot 43'

Jules Ottenstadion, Ghent
Attendance: 5,704
Referee: Wilfred Wallace (Republic of Ireland)

Gent won 3–2 on aggregate.

1 October 1986
20:00

Carl Zeiss Jena (East Germany)	0–4	(West Germany) Bayer 05 Uerdingen
	Report	Herget 68'; Eðvaldsson 76'; Kuntz 77'; Bommer 90'

Ernst-Abbe-Sportfeld, Jena
Attendance: 16,000
Referee: Jean-François Crucke (Belgium)

Bayer 05 Uerdingen won 7–0 on aggregate.

1 October 1986
20:00

Toulouse (France)	1–0 (a.e.t.)	(Italy) Napoli
Stopyra 15'	Report
Penalties
Stopyra (penalty missed); Márcico (penalty scored); Durand (penalty scored); Marx (penalty scored); Tarantini (penalty scored)	4–3	(penalty scored) Giordano; (penalty scored) Ferrario; (penalty scored) Renica; (penalty missed) Bagni; (penalty missed) Maradona

Stadium Municipal, Toulouse
Attendance: 34,951
Referee: Erik Fredriksson (Sweden)

1–1 on aggregate; Toulouse won 4–3 on penalties.

1 October 1986
20:00

Standard Liège (Belgium)	1–1	(Socialist Federal Republic of Yugoslavia) Rijeka
Bodart 65' (pen.)	Report	Janković 49'

Stade Maurice-Dufrasne, Liège
Attendance: 12,936
Referee: Emilio Carlos Guruceta (Spain)

Standard Liège won 2–1 on aggregate.

1 October 1986
20:00

Feyenoord (Netherlands)	2–0	(Hungary) Pécs
Heus 67'; Hofman 84'	Report

De Kuip, Rotterdam
Attendance: 26,679
Referee: Brian Hill (England)

Feyenoord won 2–1 on aggregate.

1 October 1986
20:15

Luzern (Switzerland)	0–1	(Soviet Union) Spartak Moscow
	Report	Kuzhlev 87'

Stadion Allmend, Lucerne
Attendance: 17,300
Referee: Jozef Marko (Czechoslovakia)

Spartak Moscow won 1–0 on aggregate.

1 October 1986
20:30

Torino (Italy)	1–1	(France) Nantes
Kieft 49' (pen.)	Report	Anziani 66'

Stadio Comunale "Vittorio Pozzo", Turin
Attendance: 33,586
Referee: Keith Hackett (England)

Torino won 5–1 on aggregate.

1 October 1986
20:30

Dundee United (Scotland)	2–0	(France) Lens
Milne 56'; Coyne 59'	Report

Tannadice Park, Dundee
Attendance: 11,645
Referee: Claudio Pieri (Italy)

Dundee United won 2–1 on aggregate.

1 October 1986
21:00

Omonia (Cyprus)	1–1	(Romania) Sportul Studențesc
Savvidis 79'	Report	Iorgulescu 44'

Makario Stadio, Nicosia
Attendance: 17,000
Referee: Meletis Voutsaras (Greece)

Sportul Studențesc won 2–1 on aggregate.

1 October 1986
21:15

Barcelona (Spain)	0–0	(Albania) Flamurtari
	Report

Camp Nou, Barcelona
Attendance: 22,000
Referee: Alder dos Santos (Portugal)

1–1 on aggregate; Barcelona won on away goals.

1 October 1986
22:00

Sporting CP (Portugal)	6–0	(Iceland) ÍA
Meade 18'; Zinho 23', 43' (pen.); McDonald 72'; Mário 78', 87'	Report

Estádio José Alvalade, Lisbon
Attendance: 10,000
Referee: José Miguel Pérez (Spain)

Sporting CP won 15–0 on aggregate.

2 October 1986
20:00

AEK Athens (Greece)	0–1	(Italy) Internazionale
	Report	Passarella 8'

Athens Olympic Stadium, Athens
Attendance: 55,186
Referee: Ulf Eriksson (Sweden)

Internazionale won 3–0 on aggregate.

2 October 1986
22:00

Boavista (Portugal)	1–0 (a.e.t.)	(Italy) Fiorentina
Nélson 8'	Report
Penalties
Agatão (penalty scored); Caetano (penalty scored); Tonanha (penalty scored)	3–1	(penalty scored) Monelli; (penalty missed) Díaz; (penalty missed) Maldera; (penalty missed) Onorati

Estádio do Bessa, Porto
Attendance: 10,000
Referee: Jan Keizer (Netherlands)

1–1 on aggregate; Boavista won 3–1 on penalties.

== Second round ==
Team 1	Agg.	Team 2	1st leg	2nd leg
Borussia Mönchengladbach (West Germany)	7–1	(Netherlands) Feyenoord	5–1	2–0
Dukla Prague (Czechoslovakia)	1–1 (a)	(West Germany) Bayer Leverkusen	0–0	1–1
Dundee United (Scotland)	3–1	(Romania) Universitatea Craiova	3–0	0–1
Groningen (Netherlands)	1–1 (a)	(Switzerland) Neuchâtel Xamax	0–0	1–1
Barcelona (Spain)	2–2 (a)	(Portugal) Sporting CP	1–0	1–2
Swarovski Tirol (Austria)	4–4 (a)	(Belgium) Standard Liège	2–1	2–3
Hajduk Split (Socialist Federal Republic of Yugoslavia)	5–3	(Bulgaria) Trakia Plovdiv	3–1	2–2
IFK Göteborg (Sweden)	3–1	(East Germany) Stahl Brandenburg	2–0	1–1
Beveren (Belgium)	4–3	(Spain) Athletic Bilbao	3–1	1–2
Legia Warsaw (Poland)	3–3 (a)	(Italy) Internazionale	3–2	0–1
Rangers (Scotland)	3–1	(Portugal) Boavista	2–1	1–0
Sportul Studențesc (Romania)	1–4	(Belgium) Gent	0–3	1–1
Torino (Italy)	5–1	(Hungary) Győri ETO	4–0	1–1
Toulouse (France)	4–6	(Soviet Union) Spartak Moscow	3–1	1–5
Vitória de Guimarães (Portugal)	2–1	(Spain) Atlético Madrid	2–0	0–1
Widzew Łódź (Poland)	0–2	(West Germany) Bayer 05 Uerdingen	0–0	0–2

=== First leg ===
22 October 1986
14:00

Sportul Studențesc (Romania)	0–3	(Belgium) Gent
	Report	Raeven 33'; Hinderyckx 79'; Hallaert 89'

Stadionul Regie, Bucharest
Attendance: 9,000
Referee: Gerald Losert (Austria)

22 October 1986
16:30

Vitória de Guimarães (Portugal)	2–0	(Spain) Atlético Madrid
Cascavel 47' (pen.); Roldão 89'	Report

Estádio D. Afonso Henriques, Guimarães
Attendance: 12,000
Referee: Ron Bridges (Wales)

22 October 1986
17:30

Legia Warsaw (Poland)	3–2	(Italy) Internazionale
W. Sikorski 42'; Dziekanowski 58'; Karaś 61'	Report	Altobelli 17'; Ferri 77'

Stadion Wojska Polskiego, Warsaw
Attendance: 12,000
Referee: José Miguel Pérez (Spain)

22 October 1986
17:30

Widzew Łódź (Poland)	0–0	(West Germany) Bayer 05 Uerdingen
	Report

Stadion Widzewa, Łódź
Attendance: 6,230
Referee: Einar Halle (Norway)

22 October 1986
18:00

Hajduk Split (Socialist Federal Republic of Yugoslavia)	3–1	(Bulgaria) Trakia Plovdiv
Jerolimov 7'; Bursać 13'; Deverić 40'	Report	Simov 34'

Stadion Poljud, Split
Attendance: 11,200
Referee: Georges Sandoz (Switzerland)

22 October 1986
18:30

Dukla Prague (Czechoslovakia)	0–0	(West Germany) Bayer Leverkusen
	Report

Stadion Juliska, Prague
Attendance: 4,660
Referee: Franz Gächter (Switzerland)

22 October 1986
19:00

IFK Göteborg (Sweden)	2–0	(East Germany) Stahl Brandenburg
Rantanen 12'; Larsson 21'	Report

Ullevi, Gothenburg
Attendance: 7,029
Referee: Valeri Butenko (Soviet Union)

22 October 1986
19:00

Torino (Italy)	4–0	(Hungary) Győri ETO
Kieft 26', 36'; Dossena 40'; Comi 74'	Report

Stadio Comunale "Vittorio Pozzo", Turin
Attendance: 27,405
Referee: José Rosa dos Santos (Portugal)

22 October 1986
19:30

Swarovski Tirol (Austria)	2–1	(Belgium) Standard Liège
Spielmann 10'; Jelikić 88' (o.g.)	Report	Hellers 62'

Tivoli-Stadion, Innsbruck
Attendance: 8,000
Referee: Joe Worrall (England)

22 October 1986
20:00

Borussia Mönchengladbach (West Germany)	5–1	(Netherlands) Feyenoord
Dreßen 18', 44'; Rahn 53'; Bruns 68'; Thiele 79'	Report	Elstrup 43'

Bökelbergstadion, Mönchengladbach
Attendance: 18,440
Referee: Victoriano Sánchez Arminio (Spain)

22 October 1986
20:00

Groningen (Netherlands)	0–0	(Switzerland) Neuchâtel Xamax
	Report

Stadion Oosterpark, Groningen
Attendance: 15,302
Referee: Thorbjørn Aas (Norway)

22 October 1986
20:00

Beveren (Belgium)	3–1	(Spain) Athletic Bilbao
Peeraer 14'; Theunis 28'; Fairclough 58'	Report	Sarriugarte 16'

Freethielstadion, Beveren
Attendance: 6,000
Referee: Velichko Tsonchev (Bulgaria)

22 October 1986
20:30

Dundee United (Scotland)	3–0	(Romania) Universitatea Craiova
Redford 54', 89'; Clark 81'	Report

Tannadice Park, Dundee
Attendance: 10,728
Referee: Dušan Krchňák (Czechoslovakia)

22 October 1986
20:30

Toulouse (France)	3–1	(Soviet Union) Spartak Moscow
Passi 42', 66', 81'	Report	Rodionov 56'

Stadium Municipal, Toulouse
Attendance: 35,962
Referee: Zoran Petrović (Yugoslavia)

22 October 1986
21:15

Barcelona (Spain)	1–0	(Portugal) Sporting CP
Julio Alberto 73'	Report

Camp Nou, Barcelona
Attendance: 38,000
Referee: Adolf Prokop (East Germany)

23 October 1986
20:30

Rangers (Scotland)	2–1	(Portugal) Boavista
McPherson 35'; McCoist 45'	Report	Tonanha 32'

Ibrox Park, Glasgow
Attendance: 38,772
Referee: Bo Helén (Sweden)

=== Second leg ===
4 November 1986
19:30

Bayer Leverkusen (West Germany)	1–1	(Czechoslovakia) Dukla Prague
Götz 17'	Report	Vaďura 79'

Ulrich-Haberland-Stadion, Leverkusen
Attendance: 11,200
Referee: Antal Huták (Hungary)

1–1 on aggregate; Dukla Prague won on away goals.

4 November 1986
22:00

Boavista (Portugal)	0–1	(Scotland) Rangers
	Report	Ferguson 73'

Estádio do Bessa, Porto
Attendance: 15,000
Referee: Aron Schmidhuber (West Germany)

Rangers won 3–1 on aggregate.

5 November 1986
12:00

Universitatea Craiova (Romania)	1–0	(Scotland) Dundee United
Biță 59'	Report

Stadionul Central, Craiova
Attendance: 17,837
Referee: Alain Delmer (France)

Dundee United won 3–1 on aggregate.

5 November 1986
13:30

Stahl Brandenburg (East Germany)	1–1	(Sweden) IFK Göteborg
Voß 43'	Report	Rantanen 21'

Stadion der Stahlwerker, Brandenburg an der Havel
Attendance: 15,500
Referee: Frederick McKnight (Northern Ireland)

IFK Göteborg won 3–1 on aggregate.

5 November 1986
14:00

Trakia Plovdiv (Bulgaria)	2–2	(Socialist Federal Republic of Yugoslavia) Hajduk Split
Mladenov 42'; Pachev 44'	Report	Deverić 74'; Bursać 85'

Stadion Hristo Botev, Plovdiv
Attendance: 12,000
Referee: Michel Vautrot (France)

Hajduk Split won 5–3 on aggregate.

5 November 1986
17:00

Győri ETO (Hungary)	1–1	(Italy) Torino
Somogyi 14'	Report	Comi 18'

Stadion ETO, Győr
Attendance: 7,500
Referee: Jan Keizer (Netherlands)

Torino won 5–1 on aggregate.

5 November 1986
18:45

Internazionale (Italy)	1–0	(Poland) Legia Warsaw
Fanna 44'	Report

San Siro, Milan
Attendance: 48,953
Referee: George Courtney (England)

3–3 on aggregate; Internazionale won on away goals.

5 November 1986
19:00

Spartak Moscow (Soviet Union)	5–1	(France) Toulouse
Rudakov 9', 18'; Rodionov 50'; Novikov 79' (pen.), 90'	Report	Durand 7'

Central Lenin Stadium, Moscow
Attendance: 42,000
Referee: Pietro D'Elia (Italy)

Spartak Moscow won 6–4 on aggregate.

5 November 1986
20:00

Feyenoord (Netherlands)	0–2	(West Germany) Borussia Mönchengladbach
	Report	Rahn 37' (pen.), 89'

De Kuip, Rotterdam
Attendance: 14,616
Referee: Erik Fredriksson (Sweden)

Borussia Mönchengladbach won 7–1 on aggregate.

5 November 1986
20:00

Neuchâtel Xamax (Switzerland)	1–1	(Netherlands) Groningen
Sutter 39'	Report	van Dijk 44'

Stade de la Maladière, Neuchâtel
Attendance: 11,600
Referee: Lajos Németh (Hungary)

1–1 on aggregate; Groningen won on away goals.

5 November 1986
20:00

Standard Liège (Belgium)	3–2	(Austria) Swarovski Tirol
Repčić 48'; Wintacq 57'; Luyckx 66'	Report	Spielmann 14'; Roscher 47'

Stade Maurice-Dufrasne, Liège
Attendance: 23,278
Referee: Manfred Roßner (East Germany)

4–4 on aggregate; Swarovski Tirol won on away goals.

5 November 1986
20:00

Gent (Belgium)	1–1	(Romania) Sportul Studențesc
Hinderyckx 53'	Report	Iorgulescu 17'

Jules Ottenstadion, Ghent
Attendance: 8,098
Referee: Kaj Natri (Finland)

Gent won 4–1 on aggregate.

5 November 1986
20:00

Bayer 05 Uerdingen (West Germany)	2–0	(Poland) Widzew Łódź
Dziuba 23' (o.g.); Bierhoff 80'	Report

Grotenburg-Stadion, Krefeld
Attendance: 15,000
Referee: Carlos Silva Valente (Portugal)

Bayer 05 Uerdingen won 2–0 on aggregate.

5 November 1986
20:15

Athletic Bilbao (Spain)	2–1	(Belgium) Beveren
Argote 63' (pen.); Luis Fernando 76'	Report	Fairclough 58'

Estadio San Mamés, Bilbao
Attendance: 38,800
Referee: Keith Hackett (England)

Beveren won 4–3 on aggregate.

5 November 1986
21:15

Atlético Madrid (Spain)	1–0	(Portugal) Vitória de Guimarães
da Silva 90'	Report

Estadio Vicente Calderón, Madrid
Attendance: 55,000
Referee: Alphonse Costantin (Belgium)

Vitória de Guimarães won 2–1 on aggregate.

5 November 1986
22:00

Sporting CP (Portugal)	2–1	(Spain) Barcelona
Negrete 41'; Meade 60'	Report	Roberto 84'

Estádio José Alvalade, Lisbon
Attendance: 45,000
Referee: Luigi Agnolin (Italy)

2–2 on aggregate; Barcelona won on away goals.

== Third round ==
Team 1	Agg.	Team 2	1st leg	2nd leg
Dukla Prague (Czechoslovakia)	0–1	(Italy) Internazionale	0–1	0–0
Dundee United (Scotland)	2–0	(Socialist Federal Republic of Yugoslavia) Hajduk Split	2–0	0–0
Groningen (Netherlands)	1–3	(Portugal) Vitória de Guimarães	1–0	0–3
Spartak Moscow (Soviet Union)	1–2	(Austria) Swarovski Tirol	1–0	0–2
Gent (Belgium)	0–5	(Sweden) IFK Göteborg	0–1	0–4
Bayer 05 Uerdingen (West Germany)	0–4	(Spain) Barcelona	0–2	0–2
Rangers (Scotland)	1–1 (a)	(West Germany) Borussia Mönchengladbach	1–1	0–0
Torino (Italy)	3–1	(Belgium) Beveren	2–1	1–0

=== First leg ===
26 November 1986
17:00

Dukla Prague (Czechoslovakia)	0–1	(Italy) Internazionale
	Report	Altobelli 17'

Stadion Juliska, Prague
Attendance: 25,200
Referee: Karl-Heinz Tritschler (West Germany)

26 November 1986
18:00

Spartak Moscow (Soviet Union)	1–0	(Austria) Swarovski Tirol
Rudakov 26'	Report

Lokomotiv, Simferopol
Attendance: 26,200
Referee: Einar Halle (Norway)

26 November 1986
20:00

Groningen (Netherlands)	1–0	(Portugal) Vitória de Guimarães
De Kock 5'	Report

Stadion Oosterpark, Groningen
Attendance: 15,884
Referee: Valeri Butenko (Soviet Union)

26 November 1986
20:00

Gent (Belgium)	0–1	(Sweden) IFK Göteborg
	Report	Rantanen 64'

Jules Ottenstadion, Ghent
Attendance: 7,435
Referee: Neil Midgley (England)

26 November 1986
20:00

Bayer 05 Uerdingen (West Germany)	0–2	(Spain) Barcelona
	Report	Roberto 74'; Hughes 77'

Grotenburg-Stadion, Krefeld
Attendance: 27,500
Referee: Erik Fredriksson (Sweden)

26 November 1986
20:30

Dundee United (Scotland)	2–0	(Socialist Federal Republic of Yugoslavia) Hajduk Split
McInally 28'; Clark 48'	Report

Tannadice Park, Dundee
Attendance: 11,569
Referee: Werner Föckler (West Germany)

26 November 1986
20:30

Rangers (Scotland)	1–1	(West Germany) Borussia Mönchengladbach
Durrant 14'	Report	Rahn 45'

Ibrox Park, Glasgow
Attendance: 42,000
Referee: Paolo Casarin (Italy)

26 November 1986
20:30

Torino (Italy)	2–1	(Belgium) Beveren
Comi 48' (pen.); Rossi 58'	Report	Fairclough 84'

Stadio Comunale "Vittorio Pozzo", Turin
Attendance: 34,165
Referee: Adolf Prokop (East Germany)

=== Second leg ===
10 December 1986
15:30

Vitória de Guimarães (Portugal)	3–0	(Netherlands) Groningen
Nascimento 29'; N'Dinga 39'; Cascavel 81'	Report

Estádio D. Afonso Henriques, Guimarães
Attendance: 15,000
Referee: Vojtech Christov (Czechoslovakia)

Vitória de Guimarães won 3–1 on aggregate.

10 December 1986
16:30

Hajduk Split (Socialist Federal Republic of Yugoslavia)	0–0	(Scotland) Dundee United
	Report

Stadion Poljud, Split
Attendance: 26,000
Referee: Jan Keizer (Netherlands)

Dundee United won 2–0 on aggregate.

10 December 1986
17:30

Beveren (Belgium)	0–1	(Italy) Torino
	Report	Dossena 74'

Freethielstadion, Beveren
Attendance: 11,200
Referee: Franz Wöhrer (Austria)

Torino won 3–1 on aggregate.

10 December 1986
19:00

IFK Göteborg (Sweden)	4–0	(Belgium) Gent
Johansson 44'; Rantanen 50'; Hysén 57'; Larsson 64'	Report

Ullevi, Gothenburg
Attendance: 15,203
Referee: David Syme (Scotland)

IFK Göteborg won 5–0 on aggregate.

10 December 1986
19:30

Swarovski Tirol (Austria)	2–0	(Soviet Union) Spartak Moscow
Roscher 70'; Müller 72'	Report

Tivoli-Stadion, Innsbruck
Attendance: 14,000
Referee: Emilio Carlos Guruceta (Spain)

Swarovski Tirol won 2–1 on aggregate.

10 December 1986
19:30

Borussia Mönchengladbach (West Germany)	0–0	(Scotland) Rangers
	Report

Bökelbergstadion, Mönchengladbach
Attendance: 34,000
Referee: Alexis Ponnet (Belgium)

1–1 on aggregate; Borussia Mönchengladbach won on away goals.

10 December 1986
21:15

Barcelona (Spain)	2–0	(West Germany) Bayer 05 Uerdingen
Rojo 73', 79'	Report

Camp Nou, Barcelona
Attendance: 28,000
Referee: André Daina (Switzerland)

Barcelona won 4–0 on aggregate.

10 December 1986

Internazionale (Italy)	1–0	(Czechoslovakia) Dukla Prague
Rummenigge 56'

San Siro, Milan
Attendance: 44,136
Referee: Joël Quiniou (France)

The game was abandoned in the 70th minute because of the dense fog and replayed a week later.

17 December 1986
20:00

Internazionale (Italy)	0–0	(Czechoslovakia) Dukla Prague
	Report

San Siro, Milan
Attendance: 20,162
Referee: Joël Quiniou (France)

Internazionale won 1–0 on aggregate.

== Quarter-finals ==
Team 1	Agg.	Team 2	1st leg	2nd leg
Borussia Mönchengladbach (West Germany)	5–2	(Portugal) Vitória de Guimarães	3–0	2–2
Dundee United (Scotland)	3–1	(Spain) Barcelona	1–0	2–1
IFK Göteborg (Sweden)	1–1 (a)	(Italy) Internazionale	0–0	1–1
Torino (Italy)	1–2	(Austria) Swarovski Tirol	0–0	1–2

=== First leg ===
4 March 1987
19:00

IFK Göteborg (Sweden)	0–0	(Italy) Internazionale
	Report

Ullevi, Gothenburg
Attendance: 42,692
Referee: Jan Keizer (Netherlands)

4 March 1987
20:00

Borussia Mönchengladbach (West Germany)	3–0	(Portugal) Vitória de Guimarães
Criens 9'; Krauss 41'; Heitor 67' (o.g.)	Report

Bökelbergstadion, Mönchengladbach
Attendance: 16,500
Referee: Einar Halle (Norway)

4 March 1987
20:45

Torino (Italy)	0–0	(Austria) Swarovski Tirol
	Report

Stadio Comunale "Vittorio Pozzo", Turin
Attendance: 40,557
Referee: Alexis Ponnet (Belgium)

4 March 1987
21:00

Dundee United (Scotland)	1–0	(Spain) Barcelona
Gallacher 2'	Report

Tannadice Park, Dundee
Attendance: 21,322
Referee: Paolo Casarin (Italy)

=== Second leg ===
18 March 1987
17:00

Vitória de Guimarães (Portugal)	2–2	(West Germany) Borussia Mönchengladbach
Cascavel 36'; Ademir Alcântara 70'	Report	Bakalorz 30'; Heitor 85' (o.g.)

Estádio D. Afonso Henriques, Guimarães
Attendance: 12,000
Referee: Bob Valentine (Scotland)

Borussia Mönchengladbach won 5–2 on aggregate.

18 March 1987
19:00

Swarovski Tirol (Austria)	2–1	(Italy) Torino
Müller 60'; Pacult 79'	Report	Francini 86'

Tivoli-Stadion, Innsbruck
Attendance: 17,200
Referee: Erik Fredriksson (Sweden)

Swarovski Tirol won 2–1 on aggregate.

18 March 1987
20:45

Internazionale (Italy)	1–1	(Sweden) IFK Göteborg
Fredriksson 57' (o.g.)	Report	Pettersson 78'

San Siro, Milan
Attendance: 61,376
Referee: Adolf Prokop (East Germany)

1–1 on aggregate; IFK Göteborg won on away goals.

18 March 1987
21:15

Barcelona (Spain)	1–2	(Scotland) Dundee United
Calderé 40'	Report	Clark 85'; Ferguson 89'

Camp Nou, Barcelona
Attendance: 41,000
Referee: Karl-Heinz Tritschler (West Germany)

Dundee United won 3–1 on aggregate.

== Semi-finals ==
Team 1	Agg.	Team 2	1st leg	2nd leg
Dundee United (Scotland)	2–0	(West Germany) Borussia Mönchengladbach	0–0	2–0
IFK Göteborg (Sweden)	5–1	(Austria) Swarovski Tirol	4–1	1–0

=== First leg ===
8 April 1987
19:00

IFK Göteborg (Sweden)	4–1	(Austria) Swarovski Tirol
Hysén 29'; Andersson 34'; L. Nilsson 56'; Kalinić 58' (o.g.)	Report	Pacult 45'

Ullevi, Gothenburg
Attendance: 48,510
Referee: Joël Quiniou (France)

8 April 1987
21:00

Dundee United (Scotland)	0–0	(West Germany) Borussia Mönchengladbach
	Report

Tannadice Park, Dundee
Attendance: 15,789
Referee: Marcel Van Langenhove (Belgium)

=== Second leg ===
22 April 1987
19:30

Swarovski Tirol (Austria)	0–1	(Sweden) IFK Göteborg
	Report	Andersson 73'

Tivoli-Stadion, Innsbruck
Attendance: 19,000
Referee: Victoriano Sánchez Arminio (Spain)

IFK Göteborg won 5–1 on aggregate.

22 April 1987
20:05

Borussia Mönchengladbach (West Germany)	0–2	(Scotland) Dundee United
	Report	Ferguson 43'; Redford 90'

Bökelbergstadion, Mönchengladbach
Attendance: 33,400
Referee: José dos Santos (Portugal)

Dundee United won 2–0 on aggregate.

== Final ==
=== First leg ===
6 May 1987
19:00

IFK Göteborg (Sweden)	1–0	(Scotland) Dundee United
Pettersson 38'	Report

Ullevi, Gothenburg
Attendance: 50,023
Referee: Siegfried Kirschen (East Germany)

=== Second leg ===
20 May 1987
20:45

Dundee United (Scotland)	1–1	(Sweden) IFK Göteborg
Clark 60'	Report	L. Nilsson 22'

Tannadice Park, Dundee
Attendance: 20,911
Referee: Ioan Igna (Romania)

IFK Göteborg won 2–1 on aggregate.
