= 1982–83 Cardiff City F.C. season =

Welsh football club season

Cardiff City
1982–83 season
- Chairman: Bob Grogan
- Manager: Len Ashurst
- Football League Third Division: 2nd
- FA Cup: 2nd round
- League Cup: 2nd round
- Welsh Cup: 3rd round
- Top goalscorer: League: Jeff Hemmerman (22); All: Jeff Hemmerman (26)
- Highest home attendance: 15,972 (v Newport, 27 December 1982)
- Lowest home attendance: 3,813 (v Chesterfield, 7 December 1982)
- Average home league attendance: 7,730
Home colours

The 1982–83 season was Cardiff City F.C.'s 56th season in the Football League. They competed in the 24-team Division Three, then the third tier of English football, finishing second and winning promotion to Division Two.

== Players ==
Note: Flags indicate national team as defined under FIFA eligibility rules; some limited exceptions apply. Players may hold more than one non-FIFA nationality.

Pos.	Nation	Player
GK	SCO	Jim Brown
GK	WAL	Andy Dibble
GK	ENG	Steve Humphries
GK	ENG	Eric Steele
GK	WAL	Martin Thomas
DF	ENG	Gary Bennett
DF	WAL	Paul Bodin
DF	WAL	Phil Dwyer
DF	WAL	Linden Jones
DF	ENG	Jimmy Mullen
DF	WAL	Keith Pontin
MF	ENG	Dave Bennett

Pos.	Nation	Player
MF	ENG	Roger Gibbins
MF	WAL	Paul Giles
MF	WAL	John Lewis
MF	WAL	Paul Maddy
MF	WAL	Tarki Micallef
MF	WAL	Ken Stroud
MF	ENG	David Tong
FW	ENG	Jeff Hemmerman
FW	ENG	Bob Hatton
FW	ENG	Godfrey Ingram
FW	ENG	Billy Woof

Source.

== League standings ==
Pos	Team	Pld	W	D	L	GF	GA	GD	Pts	Promotion or relegation
1	Portsmouth (C, P)	46	27	10	9	74	41	+33	91	Promotion to the Second Division
2	Cardiff City (P)	46	25	11	10	76	50	+26	86	Promotion to the Second Division
3	Huddersfield Town (P)	46	23	13	10	84	49	+35	82	Promotion to the Second Division
4	Newport County	46	23	9	14	76	54	+22	78	
5	Oxford United	46	22	12	12	71	53	+18	78	

(C) Champions; (P) Promoted

=== Results by round ===
Round	1	2	3	4	5	6	7	8	9	10	11	12	13	14	15	16	17	18	19	20	21	22	23	24	25	26	27	28	29	30	31	32	33	34	35	36	37	38	39	40	41	42	43	44	45	46
Ground	H	A	A	H	A	H	H	A	A	H	H	A	H	A	H	A	A	H	A	H	A	H	A	A	H	A	H	A	H	A	H	A	H	A	H	A	H	H	A	H	A	H	A	H	H	A
Result	L	W	L	W	W	W	W	D	L	W	W	L	W	W	W	L	D	D	W	W	L	W	W	D	W	W	W	L	W	L	D	W	D	D	D	L	W	D	L	W	D	W	W	W	W	D
Position		7		12	7	4	3	3	6	4	2	6	4	3	2	3	5	4		2	4	4	2	2	2	2	1	1	1	1	1	2	2	2		2	3	3	4	4	4	3	2	2	2	2
Points	0	3	3	6	9	12	15	16	16	19	22	22	25	28	31	31	32	33	36	39	39	42	45	46	49	52	55	55	58	58	59	62	63	64	65	65	68	69	69	72	73	76	79	82	85	86

Source: Competitive matches
A = Away; H = Home; W = Win; D = Draw; L = Loss

== Fixtures and results ==
=== Third Division ===
28 August 1982 1	Cardiff City	1–2	Wrexham	Cardiff
15:00	Dave Bennett 37'	Wrexham report	19' Ian Arkwright; 72' Dixie McNeil	Stadium: Ninian Park; Attendance: 5,018; Referee: Lester Shapter (Paignton)

5 September 1982 2	Millwall	0–4	Cardiff City	London
15:00			3' John Lewis; 42' Dave Bennett; 52' Dave Bennett; 68' Roger Gibbins	Stadium: The Den; Attendance: 5,620; Referee: Howard Taylor (Oadby, Leicestershire)

8 September 1982 3	Orient	4–0	Cardiff City	London
20:00	Colin Foster 10'; Kevin Godfrey 30'; Kevin Godfrey 59'; Barry Silkman 70'			Stadium: Brisbane Road; Attendance: 2,021; Referee: Martin Bodenham (East Looe)

11 September 1982 4	Cardiff City	3–2	Wigan	Cardiff
15:00	John Lewis 22'; Gary Bennett 75'; Billy Woof 86'		19' Peter Houghton; 43' John Rogers	Stadium: Ninian Park; Attendance: 3,850; Referee: Tom Bune (Sussex)

18 September 1982 5	Walsall	1–2	Cardiff City	Walsall
15:00	Alan Buckley 13' (pen.)		4' Jeff Hemmerman; 57' Phil Dwyer	Stadium: Fellows Park; Attendance: 3,161; Referee: Brian Hill

25 September 1982 6	Cardiff City	2–0	Sheffield United	Cardiff
15:00	Dave Bennett 23'; Jeff Hemmerman 74'			Stadium: Ninian Park; Attendance: 7,147; Referee: Leslie Burden (Dorset)

28 September 1982 7	Cardiff City	2–0	Exeter City	Cardiff
19:30	Jeff Hemmerman 9'; Jeff Hemmerman 87'			Stadium: Ninian Park; Attendance: 4,867; Referee: Alan Seville (Birmingham)

2 October 1982 8	Oxford United	2–2	Cardiff City	Oxford
15:00	Kevin Brock; David Fogg 83'		(o.g.) Malcolm Shotton; 89' Jimmy Mullen	Stadium: Manor Ground; Attendance: 6,018; Referee: Mike Dimblebee (Stevenage)

9 October 1982 9	Bournemouth	3–1	Cardiff City	Bournemouth
15:00	Trevor Morgan 19'; Milton Graham 23'; Milton Graham 71'		Jeff Hemmerman	Stadium: Dean Court; Attendance: 5,818; Referee: Tony Ward (London)

16 October 1982 10	Cardiff City	1–0	Gillingham	Cardiff
15:00	Godfrey Ingram 64'	Gillingham report		Stadium: Ninian Park; Attendance: 4,828; Referee: Alan Crickmore (Plymouth)

19 October 1982 11	Cardiff City	1–0	Bradford City	Cardiff
19:30	Gary Bennett 1'			Stadium: Ninian Park; Attendance: 5,007; Referee: Derek Lloyd (Worcester)

23 October 1982 12	Huddersfield	4–0	Cardiff City	Huddersfield
15:00	Mark Lillis 28'; Mark Lillis 40'; Mark Lillis 68'; Mark Lillis 71'			Stadium: Leeds Road; Attendance: 6,121; Referee: Derek Owen (Bebington, Wirral)

30 October 1982 13	Cardiff City	1–0	Portsmouth	Cardiff
15:00	Jeff Hemmerman 53'			Stadium: Ninian Park; Attendance: 7,082; Referee: John Lovatt (Crewe)

3 November 1982 14	Reading	1–2	Cardiff City	Reading
19:30	Lawrie Sanchez 16'		42' Gary Bennett; 62' Phil Dwyer	Stadium: Elm Park; Attendance: 2,982; Referee: Danny Vickers (Essex)

6 November 1982 15	Cardiff City	3–1	Preston North End	Cardiff
15:00	Jeff Hemmerman 8'; Dave Bennett 24'; Godfrey Ingram 39'		67' Don O'Riordan	Stadium: Ninian Park; Attendance: 5,546; Referee: Ray Lewis (Great Bookham, Surrey)

13 November 1982 16	Lincoln City	2–1	Cardiff City	Lincoln
15:00	Derek Bell 61' (pen.); Paul Bodin 73' (o.g.)		36' Dave Bennett	Stadium: Sincil Bank; Attendance: 6,585; Referee: David Richardson (Lancashire)

4 December 1982 17	Doncaster Rovers	2–2	Cardiff City	Doncaster
15:00	Colin Douglas 46'; Glynn Snodin 52'		16' Tarki Micallef; 63' Jeff Hemmerman	Stadium: Belle Vue; Attendance: 3,087; Referee: Peter Tyldesley (Stockport)

7 December 1982 18	Cardiff City	1–1	Chesterfield	Cardiff
15:00	Bob Hatton 3'		73' Martin Henderson	Stadium: Ninian Park; Attendance: 3,813; Referee: Alan Crickmore (Plymouth)

17 December 1982 19	Southend United	1–2	Cardiff City	Southend
19:30	Keith Mercer 74'		Bob Hatton; 83' Roger Gibbins	Stadium: Roots Hall; Attendance: 3,476; Referee: John Deakin (Bedford)

27 December 1982 20	Cardiff City	3–2	Newport	Cardiff
11:00	Bob Hatton 44'; Jeff Hemmerman 80'; Jeff Hemmerman		Karl Elsey; Nigel Vaughan	Stadium: Ninian Park; Attendance: 15,972; Referee: Clive Thomas (Porthcawl)

28 December 1982 21	Plymouth Argyle	3–2	Cardiff City	Plymouth
15:00	Mike Carter 59'; John Sims 12', 79'		13' Bob Hatton; 43' Gary Bennett	Stadium: Home Park; Attendance: 8,631; Referee: Tom Bune (Sussex)

1 January 1983 22	Cardiff City	3–1	Bristol Rovers	Cardiff
15:00	Jeff Hemmerman 34' (pen.); Gary Bennett 41'; Jeff Hemmerman 80'		71' Les Bradd	Stadium: Ninian Park; Attendance: 10,698; Referee: Keren Barratt

3 January 1983 23	Brentford	1–3	Cardiff City	London
15:00	Stan Bowles (?)		12' Roger Gibbins; 45' Jeff Hemmerman; 62' Jeff Hemmerman	Stadium: Griffin Park; Attendance: 7,602; Referee: Alf Grey (Great Yarmouth)

15 January 1983 24	Wrexham	0–0	Cardiff City	Wrexham
15:00		Wrexham report		Stadium: Racecourse; Attendance: 3,846; Referee: Ken Baker (Rugby)

22 January 1983 25	Cardiff City	3–1	Walsall	Cardiff
15:00	Gary Bennett; Jeff Hemmerman (?); Dave Bennett		Ken Beech	Stadium: Ninian Park; Attendance: 6,237; Referee: Colin Downey (Hounslow)

29 January 1983 26	Exeter City	0–2	Cardiff City	Exeter
15:00			52' (pen.) Jeff Hemmerman; 63' Bob Hatton	Stadium: St James Park; Attendance: 4,019; Referee: Alan Robinson (Fareham)

1 February 1983 27	Cardiff City	3–0	Millwall	Cardiff
15:00	Gary Bennett 15'; Dave Bennett 57'; Jeff Hemmerman 76'			Stadium: Ninian Park; Attendance: 5,643; Referee: Malcolm Heath (Stoke)

5 February 1983 28	Sheffield United	2–0	Cardiff City	Sheffield
15:00	Colin Morris 55' (pen.); Alan Young 76'			Stadium: Bramall Lane; Attendance: 11,641; Referee: Joe Worrall (Workington)

12 February 1983 29	Cardiff City	3–0	Oxford United	Cardiff
15:00	Jeff Hemmerman 15' (pen.); Dave Bennett 52'; Bob Hatton 53'			Stadium: Ninian Park; Attendance: 6,970; Referee: Tony Glasson (Salisbury)

16 February 1983 30	Bradford City	4–2	Cardiff City	Bradford
14:45	Bobby Campbell 29'; Bobby Campbell 31'; John Black 47'; Joe Cooke 64'		79' Phil Dwyer; 89' Roger Gibbins	Stadium: Valley Parade; Attendance: 3,786; Referee: George Courtney (Spennymoor)

19 February 1983 31	Cardiff City	1–1	Bournemouth	Cardiff
15:00	Roger Gibbins 61'		50' Tom Heffernan	Stadium: Ninian Park; Attendance: 4,878; Referee: Dennis Hedges (Oxford)

26 February 1983 32	Gillingham	2–3	Cardiff City	Gillingham
15:00	Jeff Johnson 1'; Billy Lansdowne 45'	Gillingham report	4' Roger Gibbins; 28', 77' (pen.) Jeff Hemmerman	Stadium: Priestfield Stadium; Attendance: 4,587; Referee: Darryl Reeves (Uxbridge)

1 March 1983 33	Cardiff City	0–0	Reading	Cardiff
19:30				Stadium: Ninian Park; Attendance: 6,173; Referee: Roger Milford (Bristol)

12 March 1983 34	Portsmouth	0–0	Cardiff City	Portsmouth
15:00				Stadium: Fratton Park; Attendance: 24,354; Referee: Leslie Burden (Dorset)

15 March 1983 35	Cardiff City	1–1	Huddersfield	Cardiff
19:45	Bob Hatton 25'		35' David Cowling	Stadium: Ninian Park; Attendance: 10,379; Referee: Vic Callow (Solihull)

19 March 1983 36	Preston North End	2–1	Cardiff City	Preston
15:00	Alex Bruce 26'; Stephen Elliott 75'		46' Jeff Hemmerman	Stadium: Deepdale; Attendance: 4,608; Referee: Bob Nixon (West Kirby)

26 March 1983 37	Cardiff City	1–0	Lincoln City	Cardiff
15:00	Gary Bennett 64'			Stadium: Ninian Park; Attendance: 8,821; Referee: Maurice Robinson (Sutton Colefield)

2 April 1983 38	Cardiff City	0–0	Plymouth Argyle	Cardiff
15:00				Stadium: Ninian Park; Attendance: 7,226; Referee: John Holbrook (Wolverhampton)

4 April 1983 39	Newport	1–0	Cardiff City	Newport
11:00	John Aldridge 12'			Stadium: Somerton Park; Attendance: 16,052; Referee: Ray Lewis (Great Bookham, Surrey)

9 April 1983 40	Cardiff City	3–0	Doncaster Rovers	Cardiff
15:00	David Tong 8'; Roger Gibbins 16'; David Tong 75'			Stadium: Ninian Park; Attendance: 5,456; Referee: Alan Crickmore (Plymouth)

16 April 1983 41	Wigan	0–0	Cardiff City	Wigan
15:00				Stadium: Springfield Park; Attendance: 4,447; Referee: George Tyson (Sunderland)

23 April 1983 42	Cardiff City	4–1	Southend United	Cardiff
15:00	Bob Hatton 20'; John Lewis 24'; Jeff Hemmerman 44'; John Lewis 46'		70' Paul Clark	Stadium: Ninian Park; Attendance: 6,141; Referee: Derek Civil (Birmingham)

30 April 1983 43	Chesterfield	0–1	Cardiff City	Chesterfield
			73' Dave Bennett	Stadium: Saltergate; Attendance: 2,799; Referee: Alan Saunders (Newcastle upon Tyne)

2 May 1983 44	Cardiff City	3–1	Brentford	Cardiff
15:00	Jim McNichol 43' (o.g.); Bob Hatton 57'; Dave Bennett 79'		71' Chris Kamara	Stadium: Ninian Park; Attendance: 9,112; Referee: Alex Hamil (Wolverhampton)

7 May 1983 45	Cardiff City	2–0	Orient	Cardiff
15:00	John Lewis 45'; Dave Bennett 75'			Stadium: Ninian Park; Attendance: 11,480; Referee: Ron Bridges (Deeside)

14 May 1983 46	Bristol Rovers	1–1	Cardiff City	Bristol
15:00	Nicky Platnauer 63'		16' Roger Gibbins	Stadium: Eastville; Attendance: 10,731; Referee: Derek Lloyd (Worcester)

=== Milk Cup ===
31 August 1982 Round 1 (First Leg)	Cardiff City	2–1	Hereford United	Cardiff
19:45	Dave Bennett 82'; Roger Gibbins 85'		59' Derek Showers	Stadium: Ninian Park; Attendance: 1,808; Referee: Stephen Bates (Bristol)

15 September 1982 Round 1 (Second Leg)	Hereford United	1–2 (2–4 agg.)	Cardiff City	Hereford
	Mel Pejic 27'		38' Roger Gibbins; 67' Jeff Hemmerman	Stadium: Edgar Street; Attendance: 3,301; Referee: J Haigh (Macclesfield)

5 October 1982 Round 2 (First Leg)	Arsenal	2–1	Cardiff City	London
19:30	John Hollins 67'; Paul Davis 84'		75' Roger Gibbins	Stadium: Highbury; Attendance: 15,115; Referee: Allan Gunn (Burgess Hill)

26 October 1982 Round 2 (Second Leg)	Cardiff City	1–3 (2–5 agg.)	Arsenal	Cardiff
19:45	Jeff Hemmerman 50'		3' Alan Sunderland; 26' Tony Woodcock; 85' Paul Davis	Stadium: Ninian Park; Attendance: 11,632; Referee: Vic Callow (Solihull)

=== FA Cup ===
20 November 1982 Round 1	Wokingham Town	1–1	Cardiff City	Wokingham
	George Torrance 15'		78' David Tong	Attendance: 4,000; Referee: Colin Downey (Hounslow)

23 November 1982 Round 1 (Replay)	Cardiff City	3–0	Wokingham Town	Cardiff
19:30	Linden Jones; Jeff Hemmerman 55'; Godfrey Ingram 65'			Stadium: Ninian Park; Attendance: 3,755; Referee: Colin Downey (Hounslow)

11 December 1982 Round 2	Cardiff City	2–3	Weymouth	Cardiff
15:00	Roger Gibbins 28'; Jeff Hemmerman 36'		55' Anni Iannone; 80' Trevor Finnigan; 86' Gerry Pearson	Stadium: Ninian Park; Attendance: 4,446; Referee: Brian Hill

=== Welsh Cup ===
30 November 1982 Round 3	Newport County	1–0	Cardiff City	Newport
19:30	Nigel Vaughan 66'			Stadium: Somerton Park; Attendance: 7,800; Referee: Ron Bridges (Deeside)

== See also ==
- List of Cardiff City F.C. seasons

== Bibliography ==
- Hayes, Dean (2006). The Who's Who of Cardiff City. Breedon Books. ISBN 1-85983-462-0.
- Crooks, John (1986). Cardiff City Chronology 1920-86. John Crooks. ISBN 0-9511984-0-8.
- Shepherd, Richard (2002). The Definitive Cardiff City F.C. Tony Brown. ISBN 1-899-46817-X.
- Crooks, John (1992). Cardiff City Football Club: Official History of the Bluebirds. Yore Publications. ISBN 0-9513321-8-X.
- "Football Club History Database – Cardiff City". Archived from the original on 30 December 2008.
- Welsh Football Data Archive
