= Peter Nilsson (footballer, born 1958) =

Swedish former footballer

Personal information
- Full name: Peter Ulf Nilsson
- Date of birth: 8 August 1958 (age 68)
- Place of birth: Lycksele, Sweden
- Position: Midfielder

Youth career
- –1974: Lycksele IF

Senior career*
Years	Team	Apps	(Gls)
1974–1977	Lycksele IF		
1978–1981	Östers IF	100	(22)
1981–1984	Club Brugge	77	(7)
1984–1987	Kalmar FF	84	(9)
1988–1991	Örebro SK	78	(2)

International career
1975	Sweden U17	3	(0)
1975–1977	Sweden U19	25	(6)
1978	Sweden U21	4	(0)
1979–1984	Sweden	35	(0)
- * Club domestic league appearances and goals

Peter Ulf Nilsson (born 8 August 1958) is a Swedish former professional footballer who played as a midfielder. He won three Allsvenskan titles with Östers IF, played professionally in Belgium for Club Brugge KV, and won Svenska Cupen with Kalmar FF during a career that spanned between 1974 and 1991. A full international between 1979 and 1984, he won 35 caps for the Sweden national team.

== Club career ==
Nilsson started off his career at Lycksele IF, helping them advance from Division 4 to Division 1 between 1974 and 1977. Following his success in the lower divisions, he was signed to Östers IF in Allsvenskan by the legendary manager Stig Svensson. While at Öster, Nilsson was part of the team that went on to win the 1978, 1980, and 1981 Allsvenskan titles.

After his success with Öster, Nilsson signed for Club Brugge KV in the Belgian First Division during the 1981–82 season. In total, he made 88 appearances for the Belgian club in all competitions before returning to Sweden and signing for Kalmar FF.

He had a successful first few seasons with Kalmar, and helped the team finish second in the 1985 Allsvenskan. The next few years proved significantly less successful for the club in league play, as Kalmar was relegated from Allsvenskan in 1986 and then relegated again the following season from Division 1 down to Division 2. However, during these struggling years Kalmar with Nilsson in midfield managed to win the 1986–87 Svenska Cupen after beating GAIS in the final at Råsunda Stadium.

Nilsson left Kalmar after the relegation to Division 2 to sign for the Allsvenskan club Örebro SK, where he played for four seasons before finishing up his career in 1991.

== International career ==
Nilsson represented the Sweden U17, U19, and U21 teams a total of 32 times before making his senior Sweden debut in a friendly game against the Soviet Union on 19 April 1979 at the age of 20.

He made his first competitive appearance for Sweden in a UEFA Euro 1980 qualifier against Czechoslovakia which Sweden lost 1–4. He also took part in the qualifying campaigns for the 1982 FIFA World Cup, UEFA Euro 1984, and the 1986 FIFA World Cup (as an unused substitute) but did not play in a major tournament. He won his 35th and final cap on 22 August 1984 in a friendly against Mexico.

He was named Stor Grabb in 1980.

== Career statistics ==
=== International ===
Appearances and goals by national team and year
National team	Year	Apps	Goals
Sweden	1979	10	0
Sweden	1980	8	0
Sweden	1981	10	0
Sweden	1982	5	0
Sweden	1983	1	0
Sweden	1984	1	0
Total		35	0

== Honours ==
Östers IF

- Allsvenskan: 1978, 1980, 1981

Kalmar FF

- Svenska Cupen: 1986–87

Individual

- Stor Grabb: 1980
