= Jeske =

Jeske is a surname. Notable people with the surname include:

- Daniel R. Jeske, American statistician
- Frank Jeske (1960–1994), German footballer
- George Jeske (1891–1951), American screenwriter, director, and actor.
- Hugo Jeske (1873–1920), American politician
- Ludmila Jeske-Choińska-Mikorska (1849–1898), Polish singer and composer
- Susan Jeske (born 1961), American singer and first Ms. America
- Teodor Jeske-Choiński (1854–1920), Polish intellectual, writer, historian, and literature critic
