= Frankcom =

Frankcom, Frankcomb, Francomb, Francome, Francom or Francombe, along with other spellings, is a surname of British origins. Notable people with the surname include:

- Aaron Frankcomb (b. 1985), an Australian squash player
- Geoff Frankcom (b. 1942), an English rugby union player
- George Francomb (b. 1991), an English footballer
- John Francome (b. 1952), an English jockey
- John Francomb (1873–1915), an English rugby union player
- Lalzawmi (Zomi) Frankcom (1980–2024), an Australian aid worker killed in the World Central Kitchen aid convoy attack
- Peter Francombe (b. 1963), a Welsh footballer
- Sarah Frankcom (b. 1968), an English theatre director
- Septimus Francom (1885–1965), an English long-distance runner
