= 1986–87 Newport County A.F.C. season =

Welsh association football club season

Newport County
1986–87 season
- Chairman: Archie Menzies
- Manager: Jimmy Mullen (until 5 March 1987); John Lewis (from 5 March 1987)
- Stadium: Somerton Park
- Third Division: 24th (relegated)
- FA Cup: Second round
- League Cup: Second round
- Welsh Cup: Runner-up
- Top goalscorer: League: P.Gibbins (8); All: P.Gibbins (12)
- Highest home attendance: 7,172 vs Everton (FA Cup, 7 Oct 1986)
- Lowest home attendance: 1,193 vs Bolton Wanderers (4 April 1987)
- Average home league attendance: 2,069
Home colours	Away colours

The 1986–87 season was Newport County's seventh consecutive season in the Third Division, their 40th in the third tier and 59th overall in the Football League. They finished the season in 24th place and were relegated to the Fourth Division for the 1987–88 season.

Caretaker manager John Relish surprisingly wasn't chosen to continue as manager despite saving the club from relegation the previous year, and Jimmy Mullen was instead brought in as player-manager. The club started the season okay, albeit somewhat inconsistently, and occupied mid-table until the start of November. Things went horribly wrong after that however, and the club ensured a second successive season spending three months without a win. A 1–0 win over Doncaster on Valentine's Day saw a temporary improvement in form, but a 5–2 thumping at the hands of Notts County cost Mullen his job, with John Lewis stepping up to the manager's job for the rest of the season. The club picked up enough points here and there to maintain an outside chance of survival until the final weeks of the season, but a dismal return of just one point from the last six games saw them finish rock-bottom.

== Season review ==
=== Results summary ===
Overall								Home						Away					
Pld	W	D	L	GF	GA	GD	Pts	W	D	L	GF	GA	GD	W	D	L	GF	GA	GD
46	8	13	25	49	86	−37	37	4	9	10	26	34	−8	4	4	15	23	52	−29

Last updated: 9 May 1987.

=== Results by round ===
Round	1	2	3	4	5	6	7	8	9	10	11	12	13	14	15	16	17	18	19	20	21	22	23	24	25	26	27	28	29	30	31	32	33	34	35	36	37	38	39	40	41	42	43	44	45	46
Ground	H	A	H	A	A	H	A	A	H	A	H	H	H	A	H	A	A	H	A	H	A	H	H	A	A	A	A	H	H	A	A	H	A	H	A	H	H	H	A	H	A	H	A	H	A	H
Result	L	L	D	W	W	W	L	L	D	L	D	D	D	W	L	L	D	L	D	L	L	L	D	L	L	W	D	D	L	D	L	W	L	L	L	L	W	D	L	W	L	L	L	D	L	L
Position	19	21	21	18	11	9	10	14	16	23	19	19	19	16	18	18	20	20	19	21	22	23	23	23	24	22	22	22	22	22	23	22	22	22	23	24	22	22	24	22	22	22	23	23	23	24

Updated to match(es) played on 9 May 1987. Source: statto.com
A = Away; H = Home; W = Win; D = Draw; L = Loss

== Fixtures and results ==
=== Third Division ===
Date	Opponents	Venue	Result	Scorers	Attendance
23 Aug 1986	Gillingham	H	1–2	Lewis	2,533
30 Aug 1986	Bournemouth	A	1–2	Carter	2,799
6 Sep 1986	Swindon Town	H	2–2	Berry, Mardenborough	3,796
13 Sep 1986	Wigan Athletic	A	2–1	Lewis, Berry	2,004
16 Sep 1986	Darlington	A	3–1	Staniforth, Carter, Berry	1,805
20 Sep 1986	Doncaster Rovers	H	3–2	Carter, Lewis, Vinter	2,382
27 Sep 1986	Bury	A	3–4	Mardenborough, Carter, Vinter	2,136
4 Oct 1986	Brentford	A	0–2		3,231
11 Oct 1986	Chester City	H	2–2	Carter, Gibbins	2,119
25 Oct 1986	Chesterfield	A	2–3	Carter, Vinter	1,895
28 Oct 1986	Carlisle United	H	1–1	Gibbins	1,540
1 Nov 1986	Notts County	H	1–1	Mardenborough	1,960
4 Nov 1986	York City	H	1–1	Vinter	2,079
8 Nov 1986	Bolton Wanderers	A	1–0	Millett	4,530
22 Nov 1986	Middlesbrough	H	0–1		2,788
25 Nov 1986	Mansfield Town	A	0–1		2,319
29 Nov 1986	Blackpool	A	1–1	Mardenborough	3,281
2 Dec 1986	Bristol City	H	0–1		3,205
14 Dec 1986	Bristol Rovers	A	2–2	Gibbins 2	2,660
20 Dec 1986	Rotherham United	H	1–2	OG	1,760
26 Dec 1986	Walsall	A	0–2		6,855
27 Dec 1986	Port Vale	H	0–2		2,103
1 Jan 1987	Fulham	H	0–0		2,388
3 Jan 1987	Middlesbrough	A	0–2		9,585
25 Jan 1987	Swindon Town	A	0–3		6,620
14 Feb 1987	Doncaster Rovers	A	1–0	Gibbins	1,837
17 Feb 1987	Gillingham	A	1–1	Gibbins	3,542
21 Feb 1987	Bury	H	2–2	Gibbins 2	1,914
24 Feb 1987	Bournemouth	H	0–1		2,143
28 Feb 1987	Carlisle United	A	2–2	Gilligan, Vinter	2,192
3 Mar 1987	Notts County	A	2–5	Staniforth, Vinter	3,814
8 Mar 1987	Chesterfield	H	1–0	Carter	1,567
14 Mar 1987	Bristol City	A	0–4		9,137
17 Mar 1987	Mansfield Town	H	0–3		1,383
21 Mar 1987	Chester City	A	0–2		2,561
31 Mar 1987	Wigan Athletic	H	1–2	Balley	1,428
4 Apr 1987	Bolton Wanderers	H	2–1	Taylor, Thackeray	1,193
7 Apr 1987	Brentford	H	2–2	Giles, Staniforth	1,596
11 Apr 1987	York City	A	0–3		2,202
14 Apr 1987	Darlington	H	3–0	Lewis, Thackeray, Taylor	1,315
18 Apr 1987	Fulham	A	0–2		4,234
20 Apr 1987	Walsall	H	2–4	Taylor, Thackeray	2,003
25 Apr 1987	Rotherham United	A	1–3	Compton	2,555
2 May 1987	Blackpool	H	1–1	Staniforth	1,247
4 May 1987	Port Vale	A	1–6	Compton	2,733
9 May 1987	Bristol Rovers	H	0–1		3,165

=== FA Cup ===
Round	Date	Opponents	Venue	Result	Scorers	Attendance
1	15 Nov 1986	Bromsgrove Rovers	A	1–0	Vinter	3,440
2	6 Dec 1986	Fulham	A	0–2		4,052

=== Football League Cup ===
Round	Date	Opponents	Venue	Result	Scorers	Attendance	Aggregate
1–1	27 Aug 1986	Exeter City	A	0–0		1,545	
1–2	2 Sep 1986	Exeter City	H	1–0	Gibbins	1,620	1–0
2–1	24 Sep 1986	Everton	A	0–4		11,959	
2–2	7 Oct 1986	Everton	H	1–5	Carter	7,172	1–9

=== Welsh Cup ===
Round	Date	Opponents	Venue	Result	Scorers	Attendance	Notes
3	11 Nov 1986	Swansea City	A	3–1	P.Jones, Millett, OG	4,756	
4	10 Feb 1987	Shrewsbury Town	A	1–0	Vintner	634	
5	11 Mar 1987	Aberystwyth Town	A	3–3	Gibbins, Vintner, Millett	3,000	
5r	24 Mar 1987	Aberystwyth Town	H	3–0	Gibbins, Vintner, Compton	1,420	
SF-1	16 Apr 1987	Wrexham	H	2–1	Thackeray, Taylor	2,109	
SF-2	22 Apr 1987	Wrexham	A	2–2	Thackeray, Gibbins	1,989	4–3 aggregate
F	17 May 1987	Merthyr Tydfil	N	2–2	Thackeray 2	7,150	At Ninian Park
Fr	21 May 1987	Merthyr Tydfil	N	0–1		6,010	At Ninian Park

== League table ==
Pos	Team	Pld	W	D	L	GF	GA	GD	Pts	Promotion or relegation
20	York City	46	12	13	21	55	79	−24	49	
21	Bolton Wanderers (R)	46	10	15	21	46	58	−12	45	Qualification for the Fourth Division play-offs
22	Carlisle United (R)	46	10	8	28	39	78	−39	38	Relegation to the Fourth Division
23	Darlington (R)	46	7	16	23	45	77	−32	37	Relegation to the Fourth Division
24	Newport County (R)	46	8	13	25	49	86	−37	37	Relegation to the Fourth Division

(R) Relegated
