= Tim Gilbert =

Tim Gilbert may refer to:

- Tim Gilbert (footballer), English footballer
- Tim Gilbert (journalist), Australian journalist and radio and TV personality

== See also ==
- Timothy Gilbert, American piano manufacturer, abolitionist and religious organizer
