= 1987–88 Newport County A.F.C. season =

Welsh association football club season

Newport County
1987–88 season
- Chairman: Archie Menzies (until February 1988); Jerry Sherman
- Manager: John Lewis (until 7 September 1987); Brian Eastick (until 11 March 1988); David Williams (from 11 March 1988)
- Stadium: Somerton Park
- Fourth Division: 24th (relegated)
- FA Cup: First round
- League Cup: Second round
- League Trophy: Southern section First round
- Welsh Cup: Third round
- Top goalscorer: League: Taylor (4); All: Taylor (5)
- Highest home attendance: 4,022 vs Cardiff City (21 November 1987)
- Lowest home attendance: 988 vs Peterborough United (9 April 1988)
- Average home league attendance: 1,759
Home colours	Away colours

The 1987–88 season was the 60th season played by Newport County in the Football League and the first season played back in the Fourth Division since relegation from the Third Division at the end of the 1986–87 season. The club suffered a second successive relegation and were only the second team to be automatically relegated to the Football Conference.

Newport's first Division Four campaign in seven years rapidly turned into an absolute nightmare, against the backdrop of an increasingly desperate financial situation. John Lewis was sacked with the season barely a month old after a return of just one point from County's first five games, and Brian Eastick was called in to take over. Eastick won his first match in charge, but took a month to get another win. Victories over Welsh rivals Swansea City and Wrexham proved to be the sole highlight of this campaign, but were followed by a three-month run without victory, the third successive season Newport suffered such an indignity. January 1988 saw a minor improvement in form, but the already poor campaign totally fell apart afterwards, and Newport earned no wins and just three points in the next four months. Eastick was sacked during this dreadful run, and coach David Williams took charge for the remainder of the season in a fruitless attempt to avoid relegation.

== Season review ==
=== Results summary ===
Overall								Home						Away					
Pld	W	D	L	GF	GA	GD	Pts	W	D	L	GF	GA	GD	W	D	L	GF	GA	GD
46	6	7	33	35	105	−70	25	4	5	14	19	36	−17	2	2	19	16	69	−53

Last updated: 7 May 1988.

=== Results by round ===
Round	1	2	3	4	5	6	7	8	9	10	11	12	13	14	15	16	17	18	19	20	21	22	23	24	25	26	27	28	29	30	31	32	33	34	35	36	37	38	39	40	41	42	43	44	45	46
Ground	A	H	A	H	A	H	A	A	H	A	H	A	A	A	H	A	H	A	H	A	A	A	H	H	A	H	H	A	H	A	H	A	H	H	H	A	H	A	H	H	A	A	H	H	A	H
Result	D	L	L	L	L	W	L	L	D	L	L	L	W	L	W	L	L	L	L	L	L	L	L	D	L	W	D	L	W	L	L	D	D	L	D	L	L	L	L	L	L	L	L	L	W	L
Position	15	21	24	24	24	23	24	24	24	24	24	24	24	24	22	22	22	23	24	24	24	24	24	24	24	24	24	24	24	24	24	24	24	24	24	24	24	24	24	24	24	24	24	24	24	24

Updated to match(es) played on 7 May 1988. Source: statto.com
A = Away; H = Home; W = Win; D = Draw; L = Loss

== Fixtures and results ==
=== Fourth Division ===
Date	Opponents	Venue	Result	Scorers	Attendance
15 Aug 1987	Hartlepool United	A	0–0		1,926
22 Aug 1987	Burnley	H	0–1		2,006
29 Aug 1987	Exeter City	A	0–3		2,628
31 Aug 1987	Stockport County	H	1–2	Giles	1,626
5 Sep 1987	Halifax Town	A	1–3	Collins	1,095
12 Sep 1987	Torquay United	H	3–1	Sherlock, Evans, Withers	1,368
16 Sep 1987	Scarborough	A	1–3	Evans	2,345
19 Sep 1987	Scunthorpe United	A	1–3	Tupling	2,004
27 Sep 1987	Hereford United	H	0–0		1,480
29 Sep 1987	Leyton Orient	A	1–4	Hodson	3,761
3 Oct 1987	Colchester United	H	1–2	Thomson	1,200
10 Oct 1987	Cambridge United	A	0–4		1,874
17 Oct 1987	Swansea City	A	2–1	Taylor 2	3,739
21 Oct 1987	Peterborough United	A	0–3		3,163
24 Oct 1987	Wrexham	H	2–0	Thackerey, Preece	1,470
31 Oct 1987	Wolverhampton Wanderers	A	1–2	Miller	6,467
3 Nov 1987	Bolton Wanderers	H	0–1		1,566
7 Nov 1987	Carlisle United	A	1–3	Preece	1,766
21 Nov 1987	Cardiff City	H	1–2	Miller	4,022
27 Nov 1987	Tranmere Rovers	A	0–4		3,252
19 Dec 1987	Rochdale	A	0–3		1,494
26 Dec 1987	Hereford United	A	2–4	Williams, Downes	3,203
28 Dec 1987	Crewe Alexandra	H	1–2	Downes	1,918
1 Jan 1988	Exeter City	H	1–1	Gibbins	1,691
9 Jan 1988	Burnley	A	0–2		5,305
12 Jan 1988	Darlington	H	2–1	Clement, Brook	1,402
16 Jan 1988	Scunthorpe United	H	1–1	Sherlock	1,760
29 Jan 1988	Stockport County	A	1–5	Jones	2,509
5 Feb 1988	Halifax Town	H	1–0	Mann	1,509
13 Feb 1988	Crewe Alexandra	A	1–2	Bodin	2,080
19 Feb 1988	Hartlepool United	H	2–3	Williams 2	1,880
26 Feb 1988	Colchester United	A	0–0		1,784
1 Mar 1988	Leyton Orient	H	0–0		1,656
5 Mar 1988	Swansea City	H	1–2	Brook	2,235
12 Mar 1988	Cambridge United	H	0–0		1,208
26 Mar 1988	Wrexham	A	1–4	Millett	1,627
2 Apr 1988	Carlisle United	H	1–2	Taylor	1,376
4 Apr 1988	Cardiff City	A	0–4		6,536
9 Apr 1988	Peterborough United	H	0–4		988
12 Apr 1988	Scarborough	H	0–4		1,025
19 Apr 1988	Torquay United	A	1–6	Hamer	3,416
23 Apr 1988	Bolton Wanderers	A	0–6		4,357
26 Apr 1988	Wolverhampton Wanderers	H	1–3	Tupling	3,409
30 Apr 1988	Tranmere Rovers	H	0–3		1,110
2 May 1988	Darlington	A	2–0	Thompson, Taylor	1,675
7 May 1988	Rochdale	H	0–1		2,560

=== FA Cup ===
Round	Date	Opponents	Venue	Result	Scorers	Attendance
1	14 Nov 1987	Northampton Town	A	1–2	Holtham	4,581

=== Football League Cup ===
Round	Date	Opponents	Venue	Result	Scorers	Attendance	Aggregate
1–1	18 Aug 1987	Cardiff City	A	2–1	Evans 2	3,383	
1–2	25 Aug 1987	Cardiff City	A	2–2	Taylor, Tupling	3,550	4–3
2–1	22 Sep 1987	Crystal Palace	A	0–4		6,085	
2–2	6 Oct 1987	Crystal Palace	H	0–2		1,303	0–6

=== Football League Trophy ===
Round	Date	Opponents	Venue	Result	Scorers	Attendance
Grp S6	13 Oct 1987	Port Vale	H	2–0	P.Giles, Gibbins	569
Grp S6	24 Nov 1987	Exeter City	A	1–0	Thackeray	1,006
S1	19 Jan 1988	Hereford United	H	2–3	Tupling, Mann	1,232

=== Welsh Cup ===
Round	Date	Opponents	Venue	Result	Scorers	Attendance
3	30 Nov 1987	Haverfordwest County	H	2–4	P.Giles, Carr	521

== League table ==
Pos	Team	Pld	W	D	L	GF	GA	GD	Pts	Promotion or relegation
20	Stockport County	46	12	15	19	44	58	−14	51	
21	Rochdale	46	11	15	20	47	76	−29	48	
22	Exeter City	46	11	13	22	53	68	−15	46	
23	Carlisle United	46	12	8	26	57	86	−29	44	
24	Newport County (R)	46	6	7	33	35	105	−70	25	Relegation to the Football Conference

(R) Relegated
