= Peter Karlsson (footballer, born 1961) =

Swedish footballer

Personal information
- Full name: Anders Åke Peter Karlsson
- Date of birth: 4 August 1961 (age 65)
- Place of birth: Kisa, Sweden
- Position: Forward

Senior career*
Years	Team	Apps	(Gls)
1980–1983	Åtvidabergs FF		
1984–1986	Kalmar FF		
1987–1989	Örgryte IS		
1990–1995	Kalmar FF		
1992–1993	→ U.D. Leiria (loan)		
- * Club domestic league appearances and goals

Anders Åke Peter Karlsson (born 4 August 1961) is a Swedish former footballer who played as a forward. Together with Sören Börjesson and Billy Lansdowne, he became joint top goalscorer of Allsvenskan in 1985.

== Honours ==
Individual

- Allsvenskan top scorer: 1985 (shared with Billy Lansdowne and Sören Börjesson)
