= Brian Eastick =

English football coach (born 1951)

Personal information
- Date of birth: 27 January 1952 (age 74)
- Place of birth: London, England

Youth career
- Crystal Palace

International career
Years	Team	Apps	(Gls)
- England U18

Managerial career
- 1987–1988: Newport County
- 2006–2009: England U19
- 2009–2011: England U20
- 2020: Manchester City Women (assistant)
- 2022: Lommel

Brian Eastick (born 27 January 1952) is an English football manager and former player.

Eastick was technical director of Al Jazira, managed Newport County, and held various posts within the England coaching setup, including head coach of the under-19 and under-20 teams.

== Playing career ==
As a young player at Crystal Palace, Eastick was capped at England under-18 level.

== Coaching career ==
Eastick has been involved in coaching for more than 30 years, working at Queens Park Rangers, Chelsea, Brighton & Hove Albion and Charlton Athletic, before spending five months as manager of Newport County in the 1987–88 season. He then took the post of assistant manager of Leyton Orient, before working at Coventry City, Crewe Alexandra and Sheffield United. Between 1988 and 1995 Eastick worked part-time at the Football Association's National School at Lilleshall before leaving to take up a role as assistant to Bryan Hamilton in managing the Northern Ireland team between 1995 and 1998.

Eastick spent seven years at Birmingham City, brought in by manager Trevor Francis to develop the youth system from scratch, before spending two years as academy manager and head coach of Newcastle United during Sir Bobby Robson's reign.

In May 2005 he was appointed assistant to Don Givens as manager of the Republic of Ireland under-21 team. In August of the same year, Eastick was appointed a national coach with the FA and took responsibility for the England under-18 side. When Martin Hunter stepped down in June 2006 to take up a role as first-team coach with Norwich City, Eastick stepped up to take charge of the under-19s. He led that team to the final of the 2009 European Championships, before taking over as head coach of the England under-20 team, from the 2009 under-20 World Cup finals until the 2011 competition.

Eastick spent several days in Hong Kong in September 2011 as prime candidate for the post of manager of the Hong Kong national football team. He was offered the post, but turned it down.

He returned to Stuart Pearce's coaching staff, assisting with the under-21 team and with the Great Britain Olympic team. When Pearce stood in as England manager in February 2012, Eastick took charge of the under-21 match on the same night.

Eastick joined UAE Pro-League club Al Jazira in 2015 for a two-year spell as technical director.

In February 2018, he was appointed to an assistant role within Aston Villa's Academy.

On 16 February 2022, he was appointed as head coach of Belgian First Division B club Lommel.
