= Billy Lansdowne =

English footballer

Personal information
- Full name: William Lansdowne
- Date of birth: 28 April 1959 (age 67)
- Place of birth: Epping, England
- Position: Striker

Youth career
- –1978: West Ham United

Senior career*
Years	Team	Apps	(Gls)
1979–1981	West Ham United	9	(1)
1981–1982	Charlton Athletic	32	(4)
1982–1983	Gillingham	6	(2)
1983–1988	Kalmar FF	122	(38)
- Leytonstone & Ilford
- Dagenham
- Anderstorp
Total		169	(45)
- * Club domestic league appearances and goals

William Lansdowne (born 28 April 1959) is an English former professional footballer who played as a striker. Active in both England and Sweden, Lansdowne scored 45 goals in 169 career league games. On 24 September 2018 he was inducted into the Kalmar FF Wall of Fame.

== Career ==
Born in Epping, Essex, Lansdowne began his career with West Ham United, making his professional debut for the club on 28 April 1979. Lansdowne later played for Charlton Athletic and Gillingham, and made a total of 47 appearances in the Football League for all three clubs.

Lansdowne later spent six seasons with Swedish club Kalmar FF and was joint-top scorer in the Allsvenskan in 1985 with 10 goals. He played in the 1987 Svenska Cupen Final, where Kalmar FF won. In September 2018, he was commemorated with a plaque at the Guldfågeln Arena.

He later played for Leytonstone & Ilford, Dagenham and Anderstorp.

After his retirement, he remained in Sweden and became a football commentator for TV4. He later commentated on greyhound racing for TV3.

== Personal life ==
Lansdowne's father Bill was also a professional footballer who played for West Ham United. His son, Billy Jr, played for Nybro IF, IFK Berga and Lindsdals IF, in the lower levels of Swedish football.

== Honours ==
Kalmar FF

- 1987 Svenska Cupen

Individual

- Allsvenskan top scorer: 1985 (shared with Peter Karlsson and Sören Börjesson)
