= 1985 Allsvenskan =

61st season of Allsvenskan

Allsvenskan
- Season: 1985
- Champions: Malmö FF (Allsvenskan champions); Örgryte IS (Swedish champions after play-offs)
- Relegated: Mjällby AIF; Trelleborgs FF
- European Cup: Örgryte IS
- UEFA Cup: Kalmar FF; IFK Göteborg
- Top goalscorer: Sören Börjesson, Örgryte IS; Peter Karlsson, Kalmar FF; Billy Lansdowne, Kalmar FF (10)
- Average attendance: 6,037

Statistics of Allsvenskan in season 1985.

== Overview ==
The league was contested by 12 teams, with Malmö FF winning the league and Örgryte IS winning the Swedish championship after the play-offs.

== League table ==
Pos	Team	Pld	W	D	L	GF	GA	GD	Pts	Qualification or relegation
1	Malmö FF (C)	22	11	8	3	29	14	+15	30	Allsvenskan play-offs, Qualification to Cup Winners' Cup first round (Note: Malmö FF qualified for the European Cup Winners' Cup as Svenska Cupen champions 1985–86.)
2	Kalmar FF	22	10	8	4	36	30	+6	28	Allsvenskan play-offs, Qualification to UEFA Cup first round
3	Örgryte IS (S)	22	9	8	5	36	21	+15	26	Allsvenskan play-offs, Qualification to European Cup first round
4	IFK Göteborg	22	9	8	5	39	25	+14	26	Allsvenskan play-offs, Qualification to UEFA Cup first round
5	AIK	22	10	6	6	29	19	+10	26	
6	Hammarby IF	22	9	6	7	33	31	+2	24	
7	Halmstads BK	22	7	7	8	25	31	−6	21	
8	Östers IF	22	9	2	11	28	35	−7	20	
9	IK Brage	22	5	9	8	26	28	−2	19	
10	IFK Norrköping	22	6	5	11	26	35	−9	17	
11	Mjällby AIF (R)	22	4	7	11	21	41	−20	15	Relegation to Division 2
12	Trelleborgs FF (R)	22	4	4	14	23	41	−18	12	Relegation to Division 2

Rules for classification: 1) points; 2) goal difference; 3) number of goals scored.
(C) Allsvenskan Champion; (S) Swedish Champion; (R) Relegated

== Results ==
Home \ Away	AIK	HBK	HIF	IFKG	IFKN	IKB	KFF	MFF	MAIF	TFF	ÖIS	ÖIF
AIK		0–1	0–0	1–1	1–0	1–0	1–1	0–0	1–2	3–1	0–1	1–0
Halmstads BK	1–1		2–1	1–2	1–2	1–1	1–1	0–0	2–2	2–0	1–6	1–0
Hammarby IF	3–1	2–2		1–1	2–1	3–1	0–1	0–2	2–2	2–1	2–1	0–2
IFK Göteborg	4–0	2–0	1–0		4–2	2–2	6–2	0–1	0–0	2–2	0–0	4–2
IFK Norrköping	1–0	0–1	1–1	0–2		1–0	1–2	2–3	5–3	4–2	0–2	1–4
IK Brage	1–1	0–2	3–2	0–0	1–1		1–1	1–1	2–1	4–0	1–1	2–0
Kalmar FF	0–5	4–1	3–1	2–2	0–0	3–2		0–0	5–0	3–1	2–0	0–1
Malmö FF	0–1	2–2	0–1	2–1	2–1	1–0	0–0		2–0	2–0	3–0	0–1
Mjällby AIF	0–2	0–1	1–3	2–0	0–1	1–1	0–3	1–1		1–1	1–6	1–2
Trelleborgs FF	0–1	2–1	2–3	1–2	2–0	0–1	4–0	1–2	0–1		0–5	0–0
Örgryte IS	1–2	1–0	2–2	2–1	0–0	2–1	2–2	1–1	1–1	0–0		2–0
Östers IF	1–6	2–1	1–2	2–1	2–2	3–1	1–2	1–4	0–1	2–3	1–0	

Legend: Blue = home team win; Yellow = draw; Red = away team win.

== Allsvenskan play-offs ==
The 1985 Allsvenskan play-offs was the fourth edition of the competition. The four best placed teams from Allsvenskan qualified to the competition. Örgryte who placed third in the league won the competition and the Swedish championship after defeating IFK Göteborg who finished fourth in the league.

=== Semi-finals ===
==== First leg ====
19 October 1985	Örgryte	4–2	Kalmar FF	Ullevi, Gothenburg

20 October 1985	IFK Göteborg	2–1	Malmö FF	Ullevi, Gothenburg

==== Second leg ====
27 October 1985	Kalmar FF	1–3 (3–7 agg.)	Örgryte	Fredriksskans, Kalmar

27 October 1985	Malmö FF	0–2 (1–4 agg.)	IFK Göteborg	Malmö Stadion, Malmö

=== Final ===
31 October 1985	IFK Göteborg	2–4	Örgryte	Ullevi, Gothenburg

3 November 1985	Örgryte	2–3 (6–5 agg.)	IFK Göteborg	Ullevi, Gothenburg

== Season statistics ==
=== Top scorers ===
Rank	Player	Club	Goals
1	(Sweden) Peter Karlsson	Kalmar FF	10
1	(England) Billy Lansdowne	Kalmar FF	10
1	(Sweden) Sören Börjesson	Örgryte IS	10
4	(Sweden) Jan Hellström	Örgryte IS	8
4	(Sweden) Thomas Andersson	AIK	8
4	(Sweden) Torbjörn Nilsson	IFK Göteborg	8
4	(Sweden) Michael Andersson	Hammarby IF	8
8	(Sweden) Mats Magnusson	Malmö FF	7
8	(Sweden) Johny Erlandsson	Kalmar FF	7
8	(Sweden) Glenn Martindahl	Örgryte IS	7

== Attendances ==
#	Club	Average	Highest
1	IFK Göteborg	9,481	24,618
2	Malmö FF	7,829	16,200
3	Örgryte IS	6,543	26,834
4	AIK	6,367	12,300
5	Hammarby IF	5,734	12,855
6	IFK Norrköping	4,300	6,179
7	Östers IF	4,201	9,047
8	Trelleborgs FF	3,900	7,395
9	IK Brage	3,888	6,011
10	Halmstads BK	3,774	5,214
11	Mjällby AIF	3,742	7,402
12	Kalmar FF	3,679	7,636
