= Jeff Hemmerman =

English footballer (born 1955)

Personal information
- Full name: Jeffrey Lawrence Hemmerman
- Date of birth: 25 February 1955 (age 71)
- Place of birth: Hull, England
- Height: 5 ft 11 in (1.80 m)
- Position: Forward

Youth career
- Hull City

Senior career*
Years	Team	Apps	(Gls)
1973–1977	Hull City	59	(10)
1975	→ Scunthorpe United (loan)	5	(1)
1977–1978	Port Vale	15	(5)
1978–1982	Portsmouth	123	(39)
1982–1983	Cardiff City	55	(22)
Total		257	(77)
- * Club domestic league appearances and goals

Jeffrey Lawrence Hemmerman (born 25 February 1955) is an English former footballer. A forward, he scored 77 goals in 257 league games in a ten-year career in the Football League with Hull City, Scunthorpe United, Port Vale, Portsmouth, and Cardiff City. He was promoted out of the Fourth Division with Portsmouth in 1979–80, and then won promotion out of the Third Division with Cardiff City in 1982–83.

== Career ==
Hemmerman came through the youth ranks at Hull City as Terry Neill's "Tigers" ended the 1973–74 season in ninth place in the Second Division. He played, as a substitute, in the 1973 Watney Cup final defeat to Stoke City. Hull went on to finish the 1974–75 season in eighth place under the stewardship of John Kaye. He was loaned out to Scunthorpe United in the 1975–76 campaign and scored one goal in five Fourth Division games at the Old Showground. He was Hull's top-scorer in the 1976–77 season with seven goals. He scored ten goals in 59 league games during his four seasons at Boothferry Park.

Hemmerman signed with Roy Sproson's Port Vale in June 1977. He scored on his debut on 20 August, converting a penalty in a 3–1 defeat to Chesterfield at Vale Park. Two weeks later he claimed both goals in a 2–1 win over Lincoln City, but fell out of the first-team picture and ended the 1977–78 season with six goals in 20 league and cup appearances as the "Valiants" were relegated out of the Third Division under Bobby Smith's stewardship.

He moved to Jimmy Dickinson's Portsmouth on a free transfer in May 1978. Hemmerman finished as top-scorer in the 1978–79 campaign with 16 goals, as "Pompey" finished three places outside the Fourth Division promotion places. Under the stewardship of new boss Frank Burrows, promotion was secured with a fourth-place finish in 1979–80. They missed out on a second successive promotion by six points and three places in 1980–81 but then dropped back into mid-table in 1981–82. Hemmerman scored 40 goals in 123 league games during his spell at Fratton Park.

He moved to Len Ashurst's Cardiff City. He was the "Bluebirds" top-scorer in the 1982–83 Third Division promotion season with 26 goals in all competitions. However, he suffered a severe knee ligament injury against Bristol Rovers, and though he attempted a comeback the following year he struggled to regain form and fitness and subsequently retired from professional football at Ninian Park. He was awarded a testimonial match in December 1984 when Cardiff played Aston Villa.

== Post-retirement ==
After retiring, he trained as a physiotherapist and worked for Cardiff City before setting up his own rehabilitation clinic in Newport.

== Career statistics ==
Appearances and goals by club, season and competition
Club	Season	League			FA Cup		Other		Total	
Club	Season	Division	Apps	Goals	Apps	Goals	Apps	Goals	Apps	Goals
Hull City	1972–73	Second Division	0	0	0	0	1	0	1	0
Hull City	1973–74	Second Division	7	1	1	0	1	0	9	1
Hull City	1974–75	Second Division	11	0	1	0	0	0	12	0
Hull City	1975–76	Second Division	10	3	0	0	0	0	10	3
Hull City	1976–77	Second Division	31	6	1	1	1	0	33	7
Hull City	Total		59	10	3	1	3	0	65	11
Scunthorpe United (loan)	1975–76	Fourth Division	5	1	0	0	0	0	5	1
Port Vale	1977–78	Third Division	15	5	2	0	3	1	20	6
Portsmouth	1978–79	Fourth Division	37	14	2	2	2	0	41	16
Portsmouth	1979–80	Fourth Division	38	13	5	1	1	0	44	14
Portsmouth	1980–81	Third Division	14	2	0	0	0	0	14	2
Portsmouth	1981–82	Third Division	34	10	2	2	3	0	39	12
Portsmouth	Total		123	39	9	5	6	0	138	44
Cardiff City	1982–83	Third Division	44	22	3	2	4	2	51	26
Cardiff City	1983–84	Second Division	11	0	0	0	0	0	11	0
Cardiff City	Total		55	22	3	2	4	2	62	26
Career total			257	77	17	8	16	3	290	88

== Honours ==
Hull City

- Watney Cup runner-up: 1973

Portsmouth

- Football League Fourth Division fourth-place promotion: 1979–80

Cardiff City

- Football League Third Division second-place promotion: 1982–83
