= Mick Henderson =

English footballer, coach, and manager

Personal information
- Full name: Michael Robert Henderson
- Date of birth: 31 March 1956 (age 70)
- Place of birth: Gosforth, England
- Height: 5 ft 10 in (1.78 m)
- Positions: Defender; midfielder

Youth career
- 1972–1974: Sunderland

Senior career*
Years	Team	Apps	(Gls)
1974–1979	Sunderland	84	(2)
1979–1982	Watford	51	(0)
1982	Cardiff City	11	(0)
1982–1985	Sheffield United	67	(0)
1985–1989	Chesterfield	136	(10)

Managerial career
- 1988: Chesterfield
- * Club domestic league appearances and goals

Michael Robert Henderson (born 31 March 1956) is an English former football player, coach and manager. Primarily a defender, Henderson also played professionally in midfield, and spent most of his professional career in England's Football League.

Starting his career as a schoolboy at Sunderland, Henderson played a part in their promotion to the First Division in 1976, before transferring to Watford in 1979 for £120,000. He made 67 appearances for Watford in all competitions, but was a backup to Pat Rice during Watford's 1981–82 promotion to the First Division. At the end of that season, he joined Cardiff City, and later played for Sheffield United and Chesterfield. Towards the end of his time at Chesterfield, Henderson player-coached and briefly managed the team.] Following his retirement from football, Henderson became a police officer.

== Honours ==
Chesterfield

- Football League Fourth Division: 1984–85
