= Allan Sanders =

English footballer

Personal information
- Date of birth: 31 January 1934
- Place of birth: Salford, England
- Date of death: February 2015 (aged 81)
- Place of death: Bury, England
- Height: 5 ft 11 in (1.80 m)
- Position: Full back

Senior career*
Years	Team	Apps	(Gls)
1955–1956	Manchester City	0	(0)
1956–1959	Everton	56	(0)
1959–1963	Swansea Town	92	(0)
1963–1966	Brighton & Hove Albion	80	(0)
1966–196?	Cape Town City		
- * Club domestic league appearances and goals

Allan Sanders (31 January 1934 – February 2015), often spelt Alan Sanders, was an English professional footballer who made 228 Football League appearances playing as a full back for Everton, Swansea Town and Brighton & Hove Albion. He was on the books of Manchester City without making a league appearance, and also played in South Africa for Cape Town City.
