= Alfred Roscher =

Austrian footballer

Personal information
- Date of birth: 11 November 1959 (age 66)
- Place of birth: Vienna, Austria
- Height: 1.85 m (6 ft 1 in)
- Position: Striker

Youth career
- 1969–1976: FK Austria Wien

Senior career*
Years	Team	Apps	(Gls)
1976–1979	FK Austria Wien	1	(0)
1979–1981	First Vienna FC		
1981–1982	Wiener Sport-Club		
1982–1986	SSW Wacker Innsbruck		
1986–1988	FC Swarovski Tirol		
1987–1988	SV Waldhof Mannheim	9	(1)
1988–1989	SK Vorwärts Steyr		
1989–1990	VfB Mödling		
1990–1991	Austria Klagenfurt		

International career
1987	Austria	1	(0)
- * Club domestic league appearances and goals

Alfred Roscher (born 11 November 1959) is an Austrian retired footballer.
