= Gheorghe Biță =

Romanian footballer

Personal information
- Date of birth: 8 September 1963 (age 63)
- Place of birth: Ostroveni, Romania
- Positions: Defender; forward

Senior career*
Years	Team	Apps	(Gls)
1984–1986	Electroputere Craiova		
1986–1987	CS Universitatea Craiova	21	(3)
1987	Electroputere Craiova		
1988	CS Universitatea Craiova	26	(9)
1989–1993	Electroputere Craiova (Note: The statistics for the 1988–89, 1989–90 and 1990–91 seasons are unavailable.)	63	(5)
1993–1994	FC Universitatea Craiova	31	(3)
1994–1995	ES Tunis		
1995–2001	Extensiv Craiova	112	(20)
Total		253	(40)

International career
1987	Romania U21	1	(1)

Managerial career
- 2012: Alro Slatina
- * Club domestic league appearances and goals

Gheorghe Biță (born 8 September 1963) is a Romanian former footballer who played as a defender and forward. (Note: Gheorghe Biță at WorldFootball.net)

== Honours ==
Electroputere Craiova

- Divizia B: 1990–91, 1998–99
- Divizia C: 1984–85

Universitatea Craiova

- Cupa României runner-up: 1993–94
