= Geoff Frankcom =

England international rugby union player

- Full name: Geoffrey Peter Frankcom
- Born: 5 April 1942 (age 84) Bathavon, Somerset, England
- Height: 5 ft 8 in (173 cm)
- Weight: 168 lb (76 kg)
- School: King Edward's School
- University: University of Cambridge

Rugby union career
- Position: Centre
International career
Years	Team	Apps	(Points)
1965	England	4	(0)

Geoffrey Peter Frankcom (born 5 April 1942) is an English former international rugby union player.

Frankcom hails from the village of Peasedown St John outside Bath, Somerset. He was educated at King Edward's School in Bath and Queens' College, Cambridge. A three-time Cambridge blue, Frankcom starred in the 1961 Varsity Match, scoring a late try to help defeat Oxford University. He served in the RAF as a flight commander.

A centre, Frankcom was a Somerset County captain and spent much of his career at Bath. He was the top try scorer in the 1963/64 English first-class season while with Bath, then gained four caps for England in the 1965 Five Nations. In the match against Wales, Frankcom claimed to have been bitten on the cheek by Welsh forward Brian Thomas.

== See also ==
- List of England national rugby union players
