= Kevin Taylor (English footballer) =

English footballer

Personal information
- Full name: Kevin Taylor
- Date of birth: 22 January 1961 (age 65)
- Place of birth: Wakefield, Yorkshire, England
- Height: 5 ft 8 in (1.73 m)
- Position: Midfielder

Youth career
- –: Sheffield Wednesday

Senior career*
Years	Team	Apps	(Gls)
1978–1984	Sheffield Wednesday	125	(21)
1984–1985	Derby County	22	(2)
1985–1987	Crystal Palace	87	(14)
1987–1991	Scunthorpe United	157	(25)
–	Fryston C.W.		
- * Club domestic league appearances and goals

Kevin Taylor (born 22 January 1961) is an English, retired professional footballer who scored 62 goals from 391 appearances in the Football League playing as a midfielder for Sheffield Wednesday, Derby County, Crystal Palace and Scunthorpe United.

== Career ==
Taylor was born in Wakefield, which was then in the West Riding of Yorkshire. He began his football career as an apprentice with Sheffield Wednesday, made his first-team debut in January 1979, and stayed with the club for six years. In his last season with the club, he helped them to runners-up spot in the Second Division and promotion to the First, but was then sold to Derby County, then a Third Division team. After only a few months he moved on to Crystal Palace, where he spent two-and-a-half years and played 99 games in all competitions. In October 1987 he signed for Scunthorpe United, his last professional club, where his passing ability contributed to their reaching the play-offs three times in four years. He went on to play non-league football for Fryston Colliery Welfare.

After retiring, Taylor played into his late 40s playing for local teams such as Royston Ship (in which he won the Sheffield Cup scoring the decisive goal in a 1–0 win) and Royston WMC both of the Barnsley League.

Taylor also played for Royston Cross over 35s.
