= Andreas Spielmann =

Austrian footballer and manager

Personal information
- Date of birth: 26 March 1965 (age 61)
- Place of birth: Austria
- Position: Midfielder

Senior career*
Years	Team	Apps	(Gls)
–1988	FC Tirol	104	(25)
1988–1990	SKN St. Pölten	29	(1)
1990–1991	First Vienna FC	19	(2)
1991	LASK Linz		
1992	Apollon Kalamarias		
1992–1993	FC Wacker	4	(0)
1993–2003	SVG Reichenau	122	(0)
2010–2011	SVG Reichenau	1	(0)

International career
1986	Austria	1	(0)

Managerial career
- 2013–: AKA Tirol U18
- * Club domestic league appearances and goals

Andreas Spielmann (born 26 March 1965) is an Austrian football manager and former footballer who played as a midfielder.

== Honours ==
- Austrian Football Bundesliga: 1988–89
