= Daniel R. Jeske =

American statistician

Daniel Robert Jeske is an American statistician, a Vice Provost at the University of California, Riverside, President of the International Society for Business and Industrial Statistics, and former editor-in-chief of The American Statistician.

== Biography ==
He received a BS from the Department of Mathematics at Austin Peay State University in 1980, and received MS and PhD degrees from the Department of Statistics at Iowa State University in 1982 and 1985, respectively. He was a member of technical staff, a distinguished member of technical staff, and a technical manager at AT&T Bell Laboratories between 1985 and 2003. Concurrent with those positions, he was a visiting part-time lecturer in the Department of Statistics at Rutgers University. Since 2003, he has been a faculty member in the Department of Statistics at the University of California, Riverside. He was the chair of the Department of Statistics at UCR during 2008–2015. He is the vice provost of academic personnel and previously served as the vice provost of administrative resolution at UCR. He is an elected Fellow of the American Statistical Association and an Elected Member of the International Statistical Institute. He has published over 100 peer-reviewed journal articles and is a co-inventor on 10 U.S. patents. He served a 3-year term on the Board of Directors of ASA in 2014–2016 and was editor-in-chief of The American Statistician 2018–2020.
