= Eberhard Janotta =

German footballer

Personal information
- Date of birth: 14 December 1961 (age 64)
- Place of birth: Leegebruch, East Germany
- Height: 1.76 m (5 ft 9 in)
- Position: Midfielder

Senior career*
Years	Team	Apps	(Gls)
1979–1981	Motor Babelsberg		
1981–1984	Stahl Hennigsdorf		
1984	Chemie PCK Schwedt		
1984–1992	Stahl Brandenburg	198	(49)
1992–?	SG Bergmann-Borsig		
- Eintracht Oranienburg

International career
1986	East Germany	1	(0)
- * Club domestic league appearances and goals

Eberhard Janotta (born 14 December 1961) is a German former footballer who played as a midfielder.

The midfield player appeared in 146 East German top-flight matches and scored 35 goals.

Janotta won one cap for the East Germany national team in 1986.
