= Sören Börjesson =

Swedish footballer and manager (1956–2024)

Personal information
- Full name: Lennart Sören Börjesson
- Date of birth: 14 March 1956
- Place of birth: Gothenburg, Sweden
- Date of death: 26 September 2024 (aged 68)
- Place of death: Göteborg, Sweden
- Position: Forward

Senior career*
Years	Team	Apps	(Gls)
–1972	Hovås IF		
1973–1985	Örgryte IS	308	(88)
1986–1987	Djurgårdens IF	47	(11)
1988	Billdals IK		

International career
	Sweden U18	10	(2)
	Sweden U21	25	(1)
1981–1983	Sweden	5	(0)

Managerial career
- 2006: Örgryte IS
- 2017: Örgryte IS
- 2020: Örgryte IS
- * Club domestic league appearances and goals

Sören Börjesson (14 March 1956 – 26 September 2024) was a Swedish football manager and player. He made five appearances for Sweden, 182 Allsvenskan appearances for Örgryte IS and 22 Allsvenskan appearances for Djurgårdens IF. After his active career, he became youth and assistant coach in Örgryte IS, later manager in the 2006 season.

Sören Börjesson was born on 14 March 1956. He was the son of Helge Börjesson and nephew of Rune Börjesson who were also footballers. He died on 26 September 2024, at the age of 68.

== Honours ==
Örgryte IS

- Division 2 Södra: 1980
- Allsvenskan: 1985

Djurgårdens IF

- Division 1 Norra: 1987

Individual

- Allsvenskan top scorer: 1985 (shared with Peter Karlsson and Billy Lansdowne)
