= Frank Jeske =

German footballer

Personal information
- Full name: Frank Jeske
- Date of birth: 6 February 1960
- Place of birth: Wustrau, East Germany
- Date of death: 27 August 1994 (aged 34)
- Place of death: Bückwitz, Germany

Senior career*
Years	Team	Apps	(Gls)
- BSG Elektronik Neuruppin
- BSG Stahl Hennigsdorf
1982–	BSG Stahl Brandenberg	229	(95)
–1994	SV Schwarz-Rot Neustadt		
- * Club domestic league appearances and goals

Frank Jeske (6 February 1960 – 27 August 1994) was a German footballer.

== Achievements ==
During the 1986–87 UEFA Cup campaign, Jeske made 3 appearances for BSG Stahl Brandenberg and scored the match-winning goal against Coleraine in the first round.

== Death ==
Jeske, who made numerous appearances in the DDR-Oberliga during his career prior to German reunification, died in 1994 as a passenger in a car accident on the way home after a match.
