= 1987 Svenska Cupen final =

- Event: 1986–87 Svenska Cupen
| Kalmar FF | GAIS |
| 2 | 0 |
- Date: 20 June 1987
- Venue: Råsunda, Stockholm
- Attendance: 8,740

The 1987 Svenska Cupen final took place on 29 June 1987 at Råsunda in Solna. The match was contested by the back then second tier Div II teams Kalmar FF and GAIS. GAIS played their first final since 1942 and their second final in total, Kalmar played their first final since 1981 and their 2nd final in total. Kalmar FF won their 2nd title with a 2–0 victory.
