= Tim Gilbert (footballer) =

English footballer

Personal information
- Full name: Timothy Hew Gilbert
- Date of birth: 28 August 1958
- Place of birth: South Shields, England
- Date of death: 27 May 1995 (aged 36)
- Position: Left back

Youth career
- –: Sunderland

Senior career*
Years	Team	Apps	(Gls)
1976–1980	Sunderland	36	(3)
1980–1982	Cardiff City	33	(1)
1982–1984	Darlington	65	(3)
–	North Shields		
- * Club domestic league appearances and goals

Timothy Hew Gilbert (28 August 1958 – 27 May 1995) was an English footballer who made 134 appearances in the Football League playing as a left back for Sunderland, Cardiff City and Darlington in the 1970s and 1980s. He also played non-league football for North Shields.

== Life and career ==
Gilbert was born in South Shields, County Durham, and began his football career as an apprentice with Sunderland. He made his debut as an 18-year-old, on 27 December 1976, entering the derby against Newcastle United as a second-half substitute. That was his only appearance in the First Division: Sunderland were relegated at the end of that season and his remaining 35 league matches for the club were all made in the second tier. In 1980, he joined Second Division Cardiff City, where he spent two seasons, returning to his native north-east of England in 1982 for two seasons with Fourth Division Darlington. He then moved into non-league football with North Shields.

Gilbert died in May 1995 at the age of 36. His son Peter went on to play in the Football League, also as a left back.
