= Peter Francombe =

Welsh footballer (born 1963)

Personal information
- Full name: Peter Francombe
- Date of birth: 4 August 1963 (age 63)
- Place of birth: Cardiff, Wales
- Position: Defender

Youth career
- Crystal Palace

Senior career*
Years	Team	Apps	(Gls)
1981–1982	Cardiff City	3	(0)
- Bridgend Town

Managerial career
- Bridgend Town
- * Club domestic league appearances and goals

Peter Francombe (born 4 August 1963) is a Welsh former professional footballer who played as a defender.

== Career ==
Following being an apprentice at Crystal Palace, Francombe joined hometown club Cardiff City in 1981, making three Football League appearances at the club. After departing Cardiff, Francombe played domestic football in Wales, playing for Bridgend Town.
