= Tarki Micallef =

Welsh footballer

Personal information
- Full name: Constantinous Micallef
- Date of birth: 24 January 1961 (age 65)
- Place of birth: Cardiff, Wales
- Height: 5 ft 5 in (1.65 m)
- Position: Midfielder

Youth career
- Cardiff City

Senior career*
Years	Team	Apps	(Gls)
1978–1983	Cardiff City	81	(11)
1983–1984	Newport County	24	(2)
1984	Gillingham	2	(0)
1984–1986	Cardiff City	40	(1)
1986–1987	Bristol Rovers	18	(1)
1987–?	Barry Town		

International career
- Wales U21
- * Club domestic league appearances and goals

Constantinous "Tarki" Micallef (born 24 January 1961) is a Welsh former professional footballer.

== Career ==
The son of a Greek restaurateur, Micallef was born in the Grangetown area of Cardiff and was a Welsh schoolboy international before joining Cardiff City as a trainee, working his way up to the first team. Micallef made his debut in December 1978 at the age of seventeen against Sheffield United, which was to be his only appearance for the Bluebirds that year. Eventually, he established himself in the team during the 1981–82 season, but moved to Newport County as part of a five-man swap deal (including John Lewis and Linden Jones) in exchange for Nigel Vaughan and Karl Elsey in September 1983.

He remained at Newport for one year before joining Gillingham on a short term non-contract basis, making two appearances before re-joining Cardiff, only playing a handful of games as they were relegated to the Third Division. He spent one year at Bristol Rovers before moving to non-league football with Barry Town.

== After football ==
After retiring from football after leaving Barry Town, Micallef worked as a technician for the Welsh National Opera. In 2006 he lived in Penylan with his wife Maria and two children, Antonia and Tiago.
