= Linden Jones =

Welsh footballer

Personal information
- Date of birth: 5 March 1961 (age 65)
- Place of birth: New Tredegar, Wales
- Height: 5 ft 6 in (1.68 m)
- Positions: Defender; midfielder

Senior career*
Years	Team	Apps	(Gls)
1978–1983	Cardiff City	145	(2)
1983–1987	Newport County	141	(6)
1987–1992	Reading	152	(8)
1992–1996	Newport County	147	(29)
- * Club domestic league appearances and goals

Linden Jones (born 5 March 1961) is a Welsh former professional footballer.

== Club career ==
Jones was born in New Tredegar, Monmouthshire. He began his career at Cardiff City joining them as an apprentice at the age of sixteen. He made his début on 24 February 1979 in a 1–0 victory over Leyton Orient at the age of seventeen. Four days later on 28 February he became the youngest player ever to be sent off playing for Cardiff when he was red carded during a 4–1 win over Blackburn Rovers. He became an important player for the club over the next few years especially during the 1982–83 season when he helped them to promotion.

In September 1983, Jones left the club as part of a remarkable exchange deal between Cardiff and Newport County. Nigel Vaughan and Karl Elsey joined the Bluebirds and Jones, along with John Lewis and Tarki Micallef, moved to Somerton Park in return. He was a regular for Newport until the club began suffering financial difficulties and he was allowed to join Reading. He eventually left the club in 1992 and moved into non-league football before fully retiring in 1996, at the age of 36, due to a severe knee injury.

In March 2002 he joined Swansea City as their football in the community manager. He also holds a UEFA A coaching licence and, along with FAW disability officer Jamie Clewer, helped form the Swansea VIPs (Visually Impaired Players) a team for blind or partially sighted players.

== International career ==
Jones played several times for the Wales U21 squad but never went on to gain a cap at senior level, despite being called up to the squad on occasions.

== Honours ==
Reading

- Full Members' Cup: 1987–88
