= 1986–87 Svenska Cupen =

Tournament details
- Country: Sweden

Final positions
- Champions: Kalmar FF
- Runners-up: GAIS

The 1986–87 Svenska Cupen was the 32nd season of the main Swedish football Cup. The competition started in 1986 and concluded in 1987 with the final, held at Råsunda Stadium, Solna Municipality in Stockholms län. Kalmar FF won the final 2–0 against GAIS.
