= John Lewis (footballer, born 1955) =

Welsh footballer

Personal information
- Date of birth: 15 October 1955 (age 71)
- Place of birth: Tredegar, Wales
- Height: 5 ft 9 in (1.75 m)
- Position: Midfielder

Youth career
- Bristol Rovers

Senior career*
Years	Team	Apps	(Gls)
1974–1978	Aberbargoed Buds		
1978	Pontllanfraith	1	(0)
1978–1983	Cardiff City	140	(9)
1983–1987	Newport County	153	(8)
1987–1989	Swansea City	25	(0)
1989–1991	Abergavenny Thursdays		
1991	Barry Town		
1992–1995	Newport	76	(4)
1995–1998	Ebbw Vale	12	(0)
1998–1999	Merthyr Tydfil		
1999	Rhayader Town	2	(0)
1999–2000	Bohemians	0	(0)
2000–2001	Llanelli	0	(0)
2001	Merthyr Tydfil		

International career
	Wales U-21	1	(0)

Managerial career
- 1987: Newport County
- Merthyr Tydfil
- * Club domestic league appearances and goals

For people with the same name see John Lewis (disambiguation)

John Lewis (born 15 October 1955) is a Welsh former professional footballer and manager.

== Career ==
Lewis was born in Tredegar and was spotted by Cardiff City while playing for Pontllanfraith in a Welsh Football League match and was quickly offered a contract by then manager Jimmy Andrews. He made his Cardiff debut against Blackburn Rovers in September 1978. He went on to become a regular fixture in the Bluebirds line-up over the next few years before eventually leaving the club along with Linden Jones and Tarki Micallef to join Newport County in a swap deal that saw Nigel Vaughan and Karl Elsey go the other way and join Cardiff.

After establishing himself in the County side he went on to become the club's player-manager from March to September 1987 when Jimmy Mullen left for Aberdeen but Lewis could not prevent the club being relegated to the Football League Fourth Division at the end of the 1986-87 season. He was subsequently sacked after Newport took only one point from their first six games in the 1987-88 season. He moved on to spend one season at Swansea City making 25 appearances before moving to Hereford before retiring.

== Wales Under-21s ==
Lewis made one appearance for the Wales under-21 team.

== Coaching career ==
Lewis was team manager at Newport County, Merthyr Tydfil and in February 2006 he returned to Merthyr as coach.

== Managerial statistics ==
Team	Nat	From	To	Record				
Team	Nat	From	To	G	W	D	L	Won %
Newport County	(Wales)	5 March 1987	7 September 1987	20	3	3	14	15.00
