= 1970–71 Huddersfield Town A.F.C. season =

Huddersfield Town
1970–71 season
- Chairman: Frank Drabble
- Manager: Ian Greaves
- Stadium: Leeds Road
- Football League First Division: 15th
- FA Cup: Fourth round (eliminated by Stoke City)
- Football League Cup: Second round (eliminated by Nottingham Forest)
- Top goalscorer: League: Frank Worthington (10); All: Frank Worthington (12)
- Highest home attendance: 43,011 vs Leeds United (12 April 1971)
- Lowest home attendance: 13,580 vs Wolverhampton Wanderers (24 April 1971)
- Biggest win: 3–0 vs Blackpool (15 August 1970); 3–0 vs Crystal Palace (24 March 1971)
- Biggest defeat: 0–4 vs Liverpool (22 August 1970)

Huddersfield Town's 1970–71 campaign was Town's first season in the Football League's top division since the 1955–56 season, following their successful previous season in Division 2. They finished in 15th place, but only 9 points clear of the relegation zone. They had some brilliant results during the season, including a 2–1 win over champions and FA Cup winners Arsenal, and were top of the table after wins over Blackpool and Southampton. Their top position lasted only one more season, followed by their dramatic slide in the 1971–72 season.

== Squad at the start of the season ==
Note: Flags indicate national team as defined under FIFA eligibility rules; some limited exceptions apply. Players may hold more than one non-FIFA nationality.

Pos.	Nation	Player
GK	ENG	David Lawson
GK	ENG	Terry Poole
DF	ENG	Trevor Cherry
DF	ENG	Dennis Clarke
DF	ENG	Roy Ellam
DF	ENG	Geoff Hutt
DF	ENG	Alan Jones
DF	WAL	Ray Mielczarek
MF	WAL	Mike Barry
MF	ENG	Les Chapman

Pos.	Nation	Player
MF	ENG	Colin Dobson
MF	ENG	Bobby Hoy
MF	ENG	Brian Mahoney
MF	SCO	Jimmy McGill
MF	NIR	Jimmy Nicholson
MF	ENG	Steve Smith
FW	ENG	Brian Greenhalgh
FW	WAL	Dick Krzywicki
FW	ENG	Jimmy Lawson
FW	ENG	Frank Worthington

== Review ==
After a successful previous season, Town started their Division 1 lives with convincing 3–0 & 3–1 wins over Blackpool & Southampton respectively. Those wins actually put Town top of the table, but they were soon put back into place with a 4–0 drubbing by Liverpool at Anfield. They had a pretty mixed season, but they were never in any danger of being dragged into a relegation dogfight. One of their most impressive wins was a 2–1 win over Arsenal in January 1971. Goals by Les Chapman and Frank Worthington in between a Ray Kennedy equalizer gave Town a win over the eventual league and FA Cup winners.

Town finished in 15th place, despite only winning 11 games all season. They had 36 points, but never looked like getting relegated or fighting for a European place.

== Squad at the end of the season ==
Note: Flags indicate national team as defined under FIFA eligibility rules; some limited exceptions apply. Players may hold more than one non-FIFA nationality.

Pos.	Nation	Player
GK	ENG	David Lawson
GK	ENG	Terry Poole
DF	ENG	Trevor Cherry
DF	ENG	Dennis Clarke
DF	ENG	Roy Ellam
DF	ENG	Geoff Hutt
DF	ENG	Alan Jones
MF	WAL	Mike Barry
MF	ENG	Les Chapman
MF	ENG	Colin Dobson

Pos.	Nation	Player
MF	ENG	Terry Dolan
MF	ENG	Bobby Hoy
MF	ENG	Brian Mahoney
MF	SCO	Jimmy McGill
MF	NIR	Jimmy Nicholson
MF	ENG	Steve Smith
FW	ENG	Brian Greenhalgh
FW	WAL	Dick Krzywicki
FW	ENG	Jimmy Lawson
FW	ENG	Frank Worthington

== Results ==
=== Division One ===
Date	Opponents	Home/ Away	Result F–A	Scorers	Attendance	Position
15 August 1970	Blackpool	H	3–0	Smith (2), Worthington (pen)	22,787	1st
18 August 1970	Southampton	H	3–1	Krzywicki, Nicholson, Smith	24,424	1st
22 August 1970	Liverpool	A	0–4		52,628	9th
25 August 1970	Arsenal	A	0–1		34,848	9th
29 August 1970	Derby County	H	0–0		27,997	10th
1 September 1970	Tottenham Hotspur	H	1–1	Smith	26,701	9th
5 September 1970	Coventry City	A	0–0		25,899	10th
12 September 1970	Crystal Palace	H	0–2		18,820	16th
19 September 1970	Wolverhampton Wanderers	A	1–3	Dobson	19,444	18th
26 September 1970	West Ham United	H	1–1	Smith	20,887	18th
3 October 1970	Leeds United	A	0–2		36,498	19th
10 October 1970	Ipswich Town	H	1–0	McGill	17,944	18th
17 October 1970	Blackpool	A	2–2	Smith, Worthington	21,006	18th
24 October 1970	Nottingham Forest	H	0–0		17,121	16th
31 October 1970	Stoke City	A	1–3	Worthington	17,625	18th
7 November 1970	Chelsea	H	0–1		24,631	20th
14 November 1970	Burnley	A	3–2	Hoy (2), J. Lawson	18,112	17th
21 November 1970	West Bromwich Albion	H	2–1	J. Lawson, Hutt	18,209	15th
28 November 1970	Manchester United	A	1–1	Hoy	45,306	16th
5 December 1970	Everton	H	1–1	Worthington	27,658	15th
12 December 1970	Newcastle United	A	0–2		21,254	17th
19 December 1970	Liverpool	H	0–0		25,033	16th
26 December 1970	Manchester City	A	1–1	Book (og)	40,091	15th
9 January 1971	Southampton	A	0–1		19,422	16th
16 January 1971	Arsenal	H	2–1	Chapman, Worthington (pen)	30,455	15th
30 January 1971	Manchester United	H	1–2	Worthington (pen)	41,464	15th
6 February 1971	Everton	A	1–2	Worthington	37,213	17th
13 February 1971	Newcastle United	H	1–1	Cherry	15,580	17th
20 February 1971	West Bromwich Albion	A	1–2	Worthington	18,254	17th
27 February 1971	Stoke City	H	0–1		15,626	18th
6 March 1971	Nottingham Forest	A	3–1	Worthington, Nicholson, Mahoney	15,798	17th
13 March 1971	Burnley	H	0–1		18,793	18th
20 March 1971	Chelsea	A	0–0		28,207	18th
24 March 1971	Crystal Palace	A	3–0	J. Lawson, Cherry, Mahoney	16,646	17th
27 March 1971	Coventry City	H	1–0	Ellam	15,141	15th
3 April 1971	Derby County	A	2–3	Clarke, Ellam	24,194	17th
10 April 1971	Manchester City	H	1–0	Cherry	21,922	17th
12 April 1971	Leeds United	H	0–0		43,011	15th
17 April 1971	Ipswich Town	A	0–2		16,626	17th
24 April 1971	Wolverhampton Wanderers	H	1–2	Nicholson	13,580	17th
28 April 1971	Tottenham Hotspur	A	1–1	Cherry	18,859	18th
1 May 1971	West Ham United	A	1–0	J. Lawson	24,988	15th

=== FA Cup ===
Date	Round	Opponents	Home/ Away	Result F–A	Scorers	Attendance
2 January 1971	Round 3	Birmingham City	H	1–1	Hoy	26,486
5 January 1971	Round 3 Replay	Birmingham City	A	2–0	Krzywicki, Worthington	26,558
23 January 1971	Round 4	Stoke City	A	3–3	Worthington, Chapman, Mahoney	34,231
26 January 1971	Round 4 Replay	Stoke City	H	0–0		40,363
8 February 1971	Round 4 2nd Replay	Stoke City	N	0–1		39,302

=== Football League Cup ===
Date	Round	Opponents	Home/ Away	Result F–A	Scorers	Attendance
9 September 1970	Round 2	Nottingham Forest	H	0–0		18,165
21 September 1970	Round 2 Replay	Nottingham Forest	A	0–2		15,818

== Appearances and goals ==
Name	Nationality	Position	League		FA Cup		League Cup		Total	
Name	Nationality	Position	Apps	Goals	Apps	Goals	Apps	Goals	Apps	Goals
Mike Barry	Wales	MF	2 (2)	0	0	0	0	0	2 (2)	0
Les Chapman	England	MF	12 (3)	1	4	1	1	0	17 (3)	2
Trevor Cherry	England	DF	35	4	5	0	1	0	41	4
Dennis Clarke	England	DF	39	1	4	0	1	0	44	1
Colin Dobson	England	FW	6 (3)	1	0 (1)	0	2	0	8 (4)	1
Terry Dolan	England	MF	0	0	0 (1)	0	0	0	0 (1)	0
Roy Ellam	England	DF	42	2	5	0	2	0	49	2
Brian Greenhalgh	England	FW	10	0	2	0	0	0	12	0
Bobby Hoy	England	MF	11 (1)	3	2	1	1	0	14 (1)	4
Geoff Hutt	England	DF	38	1	5	0	2	0	45	1
Alan Jones	England	DF	12	0	1	0	1	0	14	0
Dick Krzywicki	Wales	MF	14 (2)	1	2	1	0	0	16 (2)	2
David Lawson	England	GK	19	0	3	0	0	0	22	0
Jimmy Lawson	England	MF	27 (1)	4	1	0	0	0	28 (1)	4
Brian Mahoney	England	MF	14 (1)	2	1	1	0	0	15 (1)	3
Jimmy McGill	Scotland	MF	41	1	5	0	2	0	48	1
Ray Mielczarek	Wales	DF	1	0	0	0	0	0	1	0
Jimmy Nicholson	Northern Ireland	MF	33	3	3	0	2	0	38	3
Terry Poole	England	GK	23	0	2	0	2	0	27	0
Steve Smith	England	MF	41	6	5	0	2	0	48	6
Frank Worthington	England	FW	42	9	5	2	2	0	49	11
