= 1968–69 Huddersfield Town A.F.C. season =

Huddersfield Town
1968–69 season
- Chairman: Frank Drabble
- Manager: Ian Greaves
- Stadium: Leeds Road
- Football League Second Division: 6th
- FA Cup: Fourth round (eliminated by West Ham United)
- Football League Cup: Second round (eliminated by Manchester City)
- Top goalscorer: League: Colin Dobson (11); All: Colin Dobson (11)
- Highest home attendance: 31,842 vs West Ham United (25 January 1969)
- Lowest home attendance: 5,702 vs Charlton Athletic (12 April 1969)
- Biggest win: 3–0 vs Cardiff City (14 September 1968); 4–1 vs Bury (28 September 1968); 3–0 vs Middlesbrough (8 October 1968); 4–1 vs Bristol City (18 January 1969); 3–0 vs Bolton Wanderers (4 March 1969); 3–0 vs Fulham (15 April 1969)
- Biggest defeat: 1–5 vs Birmingham City (7 September 1968); 0–4 vs Manchester City (11 September 1968); 1–5 vs Millwall (1 February 1969)

Huddersfield Town's 1968–69 campaign was Town's first season under new manager Ian Greaves. He would lead Town for six seasons, including two seasons in the top flight. His first season saw Town finish in 6th place in the Second Division, 10 points behind second-placed Crystal Palace.

== Squad at the start of the season ==
Note: Flags indicate national team as defined under FIFA eligibility rules; some limited exceptions apply. Players may hold more than one non-FIFA nationality.

| Pos. | Nation | Player |
|---|---|---|
| GK | IRL | John Oldfield |
| DF | ENG | Trevor Cherry |
| DF | ENG | Roy Ellam |
| DF | ENG | Geoff Hutt |
| DF | ENG | Billy Legg |
| DF | WAL | Ray Mielczarek |
| DF | ENG | Alex Smith |
| MF | ENG | Colin Dobson |
| MF | ENG | Brian Hill |

| Pos. | Nation | Player |
|---|---|---|
| MF | ENG | Bobby Hoy |
| MF | SCO | Jimmy McGill |
| MF | NIR | Jimmy Nicholson |
| MF | ENG | Steve Smith |
| FW | ENG | Paul Aimson |
| FW | ENG | Jimmy Lawson |
| FW | ENG | David Shaw |
| FW | ENG | Frank Worthington |

== Review ==
Ian Greaves was made the new manager in June 1968 and tried to improve on Town's faltering league form. He brought in new signings Terry Poole from Manchester United and Jimmy Lawson from Middlesbrough. The start to the season was in no way spectacular, with Town winning only 2 of their first 10 matches, although one of those was against eventual champions Derby County. Following that they went on a run of 6 wins out of 7, which helped Town rise the Division 2 table.

From December, Town went on a run of only 1 win in 8, but the last 2 months saw Town lose only 2 more matches from their last 13 matches, which saw Town finish in 6th place with 46 points.

== Squad at the end of the season ==
Note: Flags indicate national team as defined under FIFA eligibility rules; some limited exceptions apply. Players may hold more than one non-FIFA nationality.

| Pos. | Nation | Player |
|---|---|---|
| GK | IRL | John Oldfield |
| GK | ENG | Terry Poole |
| DF | ENG | Trevor Cherry |
| DF | ENG | Dennis Clarke |
| DF | ENG | Roy Ellam |
| DF | ENG | Geoff Hutt |
| DF | ENG | Billy Legg |
| DF | WAL | Ray Mielczarek |
| DF | ENG | Alex Smith |
| MF | ENG | Colin Dobson |

| Pos. | Nation | Player |
|---|---|---|
| MF | ENG | Brian Hill |
| MF | ENG | Bobby Hoy |
| MF | SCO | Jimmy McGill |
| MF | NIR | Alan McNeill |
| MF | NIR | Jimmy Nicholson |
| MF | ENG | Steve Smith |
| FW | ENG | Paul Aimson |
| FW | ENG | Jimmy Lawson |
| FW | ENG | David Shaw |
| FW | ENG | Frank Worthington |

== Results ==
=== Division Two ===
| Date | Opponents | Home/ Away | Result F - A | Scorers | Attendance | Position |
|---|---|---|---|---|---|---|
| 10 August 1968 | Portsmouth | H | 0 - 0 | | 10,855 | 9th |
| 14 August 1968 | Crystal Palace | A | 1 - 2 | Nicholson | 16,260 | 16th |
| 17 August 1968 | Preston North End | A | 0 - 1 | | 12,673 | 19th |
| 20 August 1968 | Norwich City | H | 2 - 2 | Nicholson, Aimson | 9,167 | 16th |
| 24 August 1968 | Derby County | H | 2 - 0 | Aimson (2) | 10,442 | 11th |
| 27 August 1968 | Middlesbrough | A | 1 - 1 | Aimson | 25,422 | 10th |
| 31 August 1968 | Carlisle United | A | 0 - 0 | | 7,935 | 10th |
| 7 September 1968 | Birmingham City | A | 1 - 5 | Worthington | 25,001 | 17th |
| 14 September 1968 | Cardiff City | H | 3 - 0 | Worthington (2), Dobson | 7,523 | 15th |
| 21 September 1968 | Charlton Athletic | A | 0 - 1 | | 15,331 | 17th |
| 28 September 1968 | Bury | H | 4 - 1 | Cherry, Hill (2), Ellam | 9,442 | 14th |
| 5 October 1968 | Blackpool | H | 2 - 1 | Aimson, Nicholson | 13,023 | 14th |
| 8 October 1968 | Middlesbrough | H | 3 - 0 | Lawson (2), Dobson | 14,799 | 5th |
| 12 October 1968 | Hull City | A | 0 - 3 | | 21,344 | 11th |
| 19 October 1968 | Sheffield United | H | 1 - 0 | Aimson | 13,667 | 9th |
| 26 October 1968 | Bolton Wanderers | A | 3 - 2 | Lawson, Dobson, S. Smith | 12,431 | 7th |
| 2 November 1968 | Aston Villa | H | 3 - 1 | Dobson, Nicholson (2) | 9,346 | 5th |
| 9 November 1968 | Bristol City | A | 1 - 0 | S. Smith | 13,738 | 4th |
| 16 November 1968 | Millwall | H | 0 - 2 | | 18,614 | 7th |
| 23 November 1968 | Fulham | A | 3 - 4 | Lawson (2), Aimson | 11,394 | 8th |
| 30 November 1968 | Oxford United | H | 2 - 1 | S. Smith, Dobson (pen) | 9,903 | 6th |
| 7 December 1968 | Blackburn Rovers | A | 0 - 0 | | 9,312 | 8th |
| 14 December 1968 | Hull City | H | 0 - 3 | | 12,418 | 8th |
| 21 December 1968 | Sheffield United | A | 0 - 0 | | 17,408 | 9th |
| 26 December 1968 | Blackpool | A | 0 - 0 | | 20,319 | 9th |
| 11 January 1969 | Aston Villa | A | 0 - 1 | | 29,029 | 10th |
| 18 January 1969 | Bristol City | H | 4 - 1 | Nicholson, Aimson, Dobson (2, 1 pen) | 9,059 | 8th |
| 1 February 1969 | Millwall | A | 1 - 5 | Kitchener (og) | 13,613 | 12th |
| 15 February 1969 | Oxford United | A | 0 - 3 | | 8,260 | 13th |
| 1 March 1969 | Portsmouth | A | 2 - 1 | Lawson, Worthington | 16,427 | 10th |
| 4 March 1969 | Bolton Wanderers | H | 3 - 0 | Dobson (2), Hutt | 8,614 | 8th |
| 8 March 1969 | Preston North End | H | 1 - 1 | Ellam | 10,281 | 8th |
| 15 March 1969 | Derby County | A | 0 - 1 | | 28,293 | 10th |
| 22 March 1969 | Carlisle United | H | 2 - 0 | Cherry, McGill | 8,560 | 9th |
| 29 March 1969 | Birmingham City | H | 0 - 0 | | 8,105 | 10th |
| 5 April 1969 | Bury | A | 1 - 1 | Lawson | 6,794 | 9th |
| 7 April 1969 | Norwich City | A | 0 - 1 | | 9,261 | 12th |
| 8 April 1969 | Crystal Palace | H | 0 - 0 | | 12,113 | 12th |
| 12 April 1969 | Charlton Athletic | H | 0 - 0 | | 5,702 | 12th |
| 15 April 1969 | Fulham | H | 3 - 0 | Lawson, Cherry, Dobson (pen) | 5,837 | 9th |
| 19 April 1969 | Cardiff City | A | 2 - 0 | Cherry, Murray (og) | 11,549 | 7th |
| 30 April 1969 | Blackburn Rovers | H | 2 - 1 | Nicholson, Dobson | 5,843 | 6th |

=== FA Cup ===
| Date | Round | Opponents | Home/ Away | Result F - A | Scorers | Attendance |
|---|---|---|---|---|---|---|
| 4 January 1969 | Round 3 | Bury | A | 2 - 1 | Hill, Nicholson | 14,251 |
| 25 January 1969 | Round 4 | West Ham United | H | 0 - 2 | | 31,842 |

=== Football League Cup ===
| Date | Round | Opponents | Home/ Away | Result F - A | Scorers | Attendance |
|---|---|---|---|---|---|---|
| 3 September 1968 | Round 2 | Manchester City | H | 0 - 0 | | 23,426 |
| 11 September 1968 | Round 2 Replay | Manchester City | A | 0 - 4 | | 26,948 |

== Appearances and goals ==
| Name | Nationality | Position | League | | FA Cup | | League Cup | | Total | |
| Name | Nationality | Position | Apps | Goals | Apps | Goals | Apps | Goals | Apps | Goals |
|---|---|---|---|---|---|---|---|---|---|---|
| Paul Aimson | England | FW | 24 (4) | 8 | 2 | 0 | 2 | 0 | 28 (4) | 8 |
| Trevor Cherry | England | DF | 42 | 4 | 2 | 0 | 2 | 0 | 46 | 4 |
| Dennis Clarke | England | DF | 15 | 0 | 0 | 0 | 0 | 0 | 15 | 0 |
| Colin Dobson | England | FW | 38 (1) | 11 | 2 | 0 | 2 | 0 | 42 (1) | 11 |
| Roy Ellam | England | DF | 41 | 2 | 2 | 0 | 2 | 0 | 45 | 2 |
| Brian Hill | England | MF | 20 (2) | 2 | 2 | 1 | 2 | 0 | 24 (2) | 3 |
| Bobby Hoy | England | MF | 8 (1) | 0 | 0 | 0 | 0 | 0 | 8 (1) | 0 |
| Geoff Hutt | England | DF | 14 | 1 | 1 | 0 | 0 | 0 | 15 | 1 |
| Jimmy Lawson | England | MF | 37 (1) | 8 | 2 | 0 | 2 | 0 | 41 (1) | 8 |
| Billy Legg | England | DF | 26 | 0 | 1 | 0 | 2 | 0 | 29 | 0 |
| Jimmy McGill | Scotland | MF | 39 (1) | 1 | 2 | 0 | 2 | 0 | 43 (1) | 1 |
| Alan McNeill | Northern Ireland | MF | 1 (1) | 0 | 0 | 0 | 0 | 0 | 1 (1) | 0 |
| Ray Mielczarek | Wales | DF | 5 | 0 | 0 | 0 | 0 | 0 | 5 | 0 |
| Jimmy Nicholson | Northern Ireland | MF | 40 | 7 | 2 | 1 | 2 | 0 | 44 | 8 |
| John Oldfield | Republic of Ireland | GK | 15 | 0 | 1 | 0 | 1 | 0 | 17 | 0 |
| Terry Poole | England | GK | 27 | 0 | 1 | 0 | 1 | 0 | 29 | 0 |
| David Shaw | England | MF | 6 (1) | 0 | 0 | 0 | 0 | 0 | 6 (1) | 0 |
| Alex Smith | England | DF | 28 | 0 | 2 | 0 | 2 | 0 | 32 | 0 |
| Steve Smith | England | MF | 22 (1) | 3 | 0 | 0 | 0 (1) | 0 | 22 (2) | 3 |
| Frank Worthington | England | FW | 14 (2) | 4 | 0 | 0 | 0 | 0 | 14 (2) | 4 |
