= 1971–72 Huddersfield Town A.F.C. season =

Huddersfield Town
1971–72 season
- Chairman: Frank Drabble
- Manager: Ian Greaves
- Stadium: Leeds Road
- Football League First Division: 22nd (relegated)
- FA Cup: Quarter-finals (eliminated by Birmingham City)
- Football League Cup: Second round (eliminated by Bolton Wanderers)
- Top goalscorer: League: Jimmy Lawson (9); All: Jimmy Lawson (12)
- Highest home attendance: 33,458 vs Manchester United (9 October 1971)
- Lowest home attendance: 9,459 vs Nottingham Forest (26 October 1971)
- Biggest win: 3–0 vs Fulham (5 February 1972)
- Biggest defeat: 1–4 vs Tottenham Hotspur (21 August 1971); 0–3 vs Manchester United (9 October 1971); 0–3 vs West Ham United (4 March 1972); 0–3 vs Derby County (15 April 1972)

Huddersfield Town's 1971–72 campaign was Town's last season in the Football League's top division. They finished bottom of the table with only 25 points, the same as Nottingham Forest. Town won only 6 matches in the league all season and did not win any games from December to the end of the season. The only bright spark came in the FA Cup campaign which saw Town reach the 6th round, before losing to Birmingham City. Town only scored 6 away goals in 1972, and 2 of those were own goals. This would be the start of Town's slump which would see Town relegated to Division 4 in 1975, and they would not return to the top flight, by then the Premier League, until 2017.

== Squad at the start of the season ==
Note: Flags indicate national team as defined under FIFA eligibility rules; some limited exceptions apply. Players may hold more than one non-FIFA nationality.

Pos.	Nation	Player
GK	ENG	David Lawson
GK	ENG	Gary Pierce
GK	ENG	Terry Poole
DF	ENG	Trevor Cherry
DF	ENG	Dennis Clarke
DF	ENG	Roy Ellam
DF	ENG	Geoff Hutt
DF	ENG	Alan Jones
MF	WAL	Mike Barry
MF	ENG	Les Chapman

Pos.	Nation	Player
MF	ENG	Terry Dolan
MF	ENG	Bobby Hoy
MF	ENG	Brian Mahoney
MF	SCO	Jimmy McGill
MF	NIR	Jimmy Nicholson
MF	ENG	Steve Smith
FW	WAL	Dick Krzywicki
FW	ENG	Jimmy Lawson
FW	ENG	Dave Smith
FW	ENG	Frank Worthington

== Review ==
Following their first season back in Division 1 for 15 years, Town were hoping to try to reach the summit of English football. This season would be one of Town's worst in their history. Town were bottom of the table all season, with the exception of a small period in September. They had a run of 4 wins in 5 during that time including a 2–1 win over rivals Leeds United. Town's last league win on 27 November was a 2–1 win over Derby County, who would become champions at the end of the season.

Town never won another league game until the next season, but they put on an inspired run in the FA Cup. After beating Division 2 sides Burnley and Fulham, Town hosted West Ham United and put on a thrilling display culminating in a 4–2 win over the Hammers. They then lost to Birmingham City in the 6th round and were then promptly relegated to Division 2 with 25 points, the same as Nottingham Forest.

== Squad at the end of the season ==
Note: Flags indicate national team as defined under FIFA eligibility rules; some limited exceptions apply. Players may hold more than one non-FIFA nationality.

Pos.	Nation	Player
GK	ENG	David Lawson
GK	ENG	Gary Pierce
GK	ENG	Terry Poole
DF	ENG	Trevor Cherry
DF	ENG	Dennis Clarke
DF	ENG	Roy Ellam
DF	ENG	Geoff Hutt
DF	ENG	Alan Jones
MF	WAL	Mike Barry
MF	ENG	Les Chapman

Pos.	Nation	Player
MF	ENG	Terry Dolan
MF	ENG	Bobby Hoy
MF	NIR	Jimmy Nicholson
MF	ENG	Steve Smith
FW	IRL	Mick Fairclough
FW	WAL	Dick Krzywicki
FW	ENG	Jimmy Lawson
FW	ENG	Dave Lyon
FW	ENG	Dave Smith
FW	ENG	Frank Worthington

== Results ==
=== Division One ===
Date	Opponents	Home/ Away	Result F–A	Scorers	Attendance	Position
14 August 1971	Leicester City	H	2–2	Worthington, Cherry	16,285	9th
17 August 1971	Arsenal	H	0–1		21,279	15th
21 August 1971	Tottenham Hotspur	A	1–4	J. Lawson	33,260	20th
25 August 1971	Newcastle United	A	0–0		40,880	19th
28 August 1971	Chelsea	H	1–2	Worthington	15,303	22nd
31 August 1971	Sheffield United	A	1–3	J. Lawson	35,007	22nd
4 September 1971	Southampton	A	2–1	Chapman, J. Lawson	17,372	21st
11 September 1971	West Bromwich Albion	H	1–0	Chapman	9,938	18th
18 September 1971	Stoke City	A	0–1		16,463	21st
25 September 1971	Leeds United	H	2–1	J. Lawson, Ellam	26,340	16th
2 October 1971	Nottingham Forest	A	2–1	Worthington, J. Lawson	15,693	14th
9 October 1971	Manchester United	H	0–3		33,458	16th
16 October 1971	Leicester City	A	0–2		22,412	18th
23 October 1971	Liverpool	A	0–2		41,627	18th
26 October 1971	Nottingham Forest	H	0–1		9,459	18th
30 October 1971	Manchester City	H	1–1	D. Smith	20,153	19th
6 November 1971	Coventry City	A	1–2	D. Smith	16,400	19th
13 November 1971	West Ham United	H	1–0	D. Smith	14,177	18th
20 November 1971	Ipswich Town	A	0–1		16,165	18th
27 November 1971	Derby County	H	2–1	Worthington, J. Lawson	15,329	17th
4 December 1971	Wolverhampton Wanderers	A	2–2	J. Lawson, Dolan	21,498	17th
11 December 1971	Crystal Palace	H	0–1		11,692	19th
18 December 1971	Southampton	H	0–2		10,436	19th
27 December 1971	Everton	A	2–2	Worthington, J. Lawson	41,088	19th
1 January 1972	Stoke City	H	0–0		12,655	19th
8 January 1972	Chelsea	A	2–2	Chapman, S. Smith	30,801	19th
22 January 1972	Arsenal	A	0–1		36,670	19th
29 January 1972	Newcastle United	H	0–0		12,829	19th
12 February 1972	Liverpool	H	0–1		18,702	20th
19 February 1972	Manchester City	A	0–1		36,421	21st
4 March 1972	West Ham United	A	0–3		18,481	21st
11 March 1972	Manchester United	A	0–2		53,581	21st
21 March 1972	Sheffield United	H	0–0		17,729	21st
25 March 1972	West Bromwich Albion	A	1–1	Robertson (og)	18,501	21st
28 March 1972	Tottenham Hotspur	H	1–1	J. Lawson	16,123	21st
1 April 1972	Everton	H	0–0		17,265	21st
5 April 1972	Leeds United	A	1–3	S. Smith	46,148	21st
8 April 1972	Ipswich Town	H	1–3	Hunter (og)	12,139	21st
11 April 1972	Coventry City	H	0–1		11,782	21st
15 April 1972	Derby County	A	0–3		31,414	21st
22 April 1972	Wolverhampton Wanderers	H	0–1		11,677	21st
29 April 1972	Crystal Palace	A	0–0		18,120	21st: Town did not drop to 22nd until Nottingham Forest finished their matches at a later date.

=== FA Cup ===
Date	Round	Opponents	Home/ Away	Result F–A	Scorers	Attendance
15 January 1972	Round 3	Burnley	A	1–0	Clarke	21,563
5 February 1972	Round 4	Fulham	H	3–0	Chapman, J. Lawson (2)	18,000
26 February 1972	Round 5	West Ham United	H	4–2	J. Lawson, Dolan, D. Smith, Worthington	27,080
18 March 1972	Round 6	Birmingham City	A	1–3	Cherry	52,500

=== Football League Cup ===
Date	Round	Opponents	Home/ Away	Result F–A	Scorers	Attendance
7 September 1971	Round 2	Bolton Wanderers	H	0–2		10,131

== Appearances and goals ==
Name	Nationality	Position	League		FA Cup		League Cup		Total	
Name	Nationality	Position	Apps	Goals	Apps	Goals	Apps	Goals	Apps	Goals
Mike Barry	Wales	MF	2 (3)	0	0	0	0	0	2 (3)	0
Les Chapman	England	MF	38 (1)	3	4	1	1	0	43 (1)	4
Trevor Cherry	England	DF	42	1	4	1	1	0	46	2
Dennis Clarke	England	DF	41	0	3	1	1	0	45	1
Terry Dolan	England	MF	18 (2)	1	4	1	0	0	22 (2)	2
Roy Ellam	England	DF	42	1	4	0	1	0	47	1
Mick Fairclough	Republic of Ireland	FW	5 (3)	0	0 (1)	0	0	0	5 (4)	0
Bobby Hoy	England	MF	22	0	0	0	1	0	23	0
Geoff Hutt	England	DF	42	0	4	0	1	0	47	0
Alan Jones	England	DF	10 (2)	0	1 (1)	0	0	0	11 (3)	0
Dick Krzywicki	Wales	MF	10 (3)	0	1 (1)	0	0	0	11 (4)	0
David Lawson	England	GK	32	0	4	0	1	0	37	0
Jimmy Lawson	England	MF	40	9	4	3	1	0	45	12
Dave Lyon	England	DF	2	0	0	0	0	0	2	0
Brian Mahoney	England	MF	4 (1)	0	1	0	0	0	5 (1)	0
Jimmy McGill	Scotland	MF	10 (1)	0	0	0	1	0	11 (1)	0
Jimmy Nicholson	Northern Ireland	MF	5	0	0	0	0	0	5	0
Gary Pierce	England	GK	10	0	0	0	0	0	10	0
Dave Smith	England	MF	8 (2)	3	2	1	0	0	10 (2)	4
Steve Smith	England	MF	40	2	4	0	1	0	45	2
Frank Worthington	England	FW	39	5	4	1	1	0	44	6
