= 1969–70 Huddersfield Town A.F.C. season =

Huddersfield Town
1969–70 season
- Chairman: Frank Drabble
- Manager: Ian Greaves
- Stadium: Leeds Road
- Football League Second Division: 1st (promoted)
- FA Cup: Third round (eliminated by Aldershot)
- Football League Cup: Second round (eliminated by Carlisle United)
- Top goalscorer: League: Frank Worthington (18); All: Frank Worthington (19)
- Highest home attendance: 30,907 vs Sheffield United (26 December 1969)
- Lowest home attendance: 10,206 vs Bristol City (30 August 1969)
- Biggest win: 4–0 vs Charlton Athletic (11 October 1969); 4–0 vs Portsmouth (15 November 1969)
- Biggest defeat: 1–4 vs Aston Villa (8 October 1969)

Huddersfield Town's 1969–70 campaign saw Town crowned as champions of Division 2. They outclassed the rest of the division and finished 7 points clear of 2nd placed Blackpool. Town's team were largely unchanged for most of the season, with 7 members of the team (Dennis Clarke, Roy Ellam, Geoff Hutt, Jimmy McGill, Jimmy Nicholson, Terry Poole and Frank Worthington) played every league match that season. They gained promotion to the 1st Division for the first time since the 1955–56 season.

== Squad at the start of the season ==
Note: Flags indicate national team as defined under FIFA eligibility rules; some limited exceptions apply. Players may hold more than one non-FIFA nationality.

| Pos. | Nation | Player |
|---|---|---|
| GK | ENG | Terry Poole |
| DF | ENG | Trevor Cherry |
| DF | ENG | Dennis Clarke |
| DF | ENG | Roy Ellam |
| DF | ENG | Geoff Hutt |
| DF | WAL | Ray Mielczarek |
| MF | ENG | Colin Dobson |

| Pos. | Nation | Player |
|---|---|---|
| MF | ENG | Bobby Hoy |
| MF | SCO | Jimmy McGill |
| MF | NIR | Jimmy Nicholson |
| MF | ENG | Steve Smith |
| FW | ENG | Brian Greenhalgh |
| FW | ENG | Jimmy Lawson |
| FW | ENG | Frank Worthington |

== Review ==
Following a successful end to the previous season, many were hoping that Town could possibly mount a serious promotion challenge to Division 1. A good start to the season followed with 3 wins from the first 3 games against Oxford United, Aston Villa and Preston North End. A loss at Leeds Road against Blackburn Rovers would be Town's only home defeat of the season, but following another loss against Queens Park Rangers saw Town stumble slightly, but they then went on a run of 1 loss in 13 matches, which saw Town climb to the summit of the table in November, but an indifferent spell in December saw Town slip to third by the end of the yeay, which then saw Town only lose one more league match during the season.

Amongst the impressive statistics from the season, Town used only 15 players during the league season and 7 of them (Clarke, Ellam, Hutt, McGill, Nicholson, Poole and Worthington) played every match. Town clinched promotion with a 1–1 draw at Middlesbrough, which was followed up by a 2–0 win at Blackburn Rovers, which clinched the title, the first trophy they had won since winning the Division 1 title for the third time, back in 1926. They finished the season 60 points, 7 clear of 2nd placed Blackpool.

== Squad at the end of the season ==
Note: Flags indicate national team as defined under FIFA eligibility rules; some limited exceptions apply. Players may hold more than one non-FIFA nationality.

| Pos. | Nation | Player |
|---|---|---|
| GK | ENG | Terry Poole |
| DF | ENG | Trevor Cherry |
| DF | ENG | Dennis Clarke |
| DF | ENG | Roy Ellam |
| DF | ENG | Geoff Hutt |
| DF | WAL | Ray Mielczarek |
| MF | ENG | Les Chapman |
| MF | ENG | Colin Dobson |

| Pos. | Nation | Player |
|---|---|---|
| MF | ENG | Bobby Hoy |
| MF | SCO | Jimmy McGill |
| MF | NIR | Jimmy Nicholson |
| MF | ENG | Steve Smith |
| FW | ENG | Brian Greenhalgh |
| FW | WAL | Dick Krzywicki |
| FW | ENG | Jimmy Lawson |
| FW | ENG | Frank Worthington |

== Results ==
=== Division Two ===
| Date | Opponents | Home/ Away | Result F–A | Scorers | Attendance | Position |
|---|---|---|---|---|---|---|
| 9 August 1969 | Oxford United | A | 2–1 | Cherry, Dobson | 9,897 | 8th |
| 16 August 1969 | Aston Villa | H | 2–0 | Hoy, Worthington | 13,364 | 2nd |
| 19 August 1969 | Preston North End | H | 3–2 | Hoy, Worthington, Cranston (og) | 13,050 | 2nd |
| 23 August 1969 | Sheffield United | A | 0–0 | | 22,528 | 3rd |
| 26 August 1969 | Blackburn Rovers | H | 0–1 | | 15,486 | 5th |
| 30 August 1969 | Bristol City | H | 3–0 | Hoy, Bush (og), Dobson | 10,206 | 3rd |
| 6 September 1969 | Queens Park Rangers | A | 2–4 | McGill, Worthington | 18,746 | 6th |
| 13 September 1969 | Blackpool | H | 2–0 | Dobson (2, 1 pen) | 10,575 | 6th |
| 17 September 1969 | Watford | A | 1–1 | Clarke | 17,548 | 3rd |
| 20 September 1969 | Leicester City | A | 1–1 | McGill | 24,552 | 4th |
| 27 September 1969 | Bolton Wanderers | H | 1–0 | Dobson | 12,326 | 4th |
| 4 October 1969 | Carlisle United | A | 2–0 | Nicholson, Dobson | 9,712 | 4th |
| 8 October 1969 | Aston Villa | A | 1–4 | Lawson | 23,192 | 5th |
| 11 October 1969 | Charlton Athletic | H | 4–0 | McGill, Worthington, Lawson, Ellam | 10,414 | 4th |
| 18 October 1969 | Middlesbrough | H | 0–0 | | 12,269 | 4th |
| 25 October 1969 | Hull City | A | 3–2 | Worthington (2), Hoy | 11,375 | 2nd |
| 1 November 1969 | Millwall | H | 0–0 | | 14,158 | 1st |
| 8 November 1969 | Norwich City | A | 2–1 | Hoy, Dobson | 13,646 | 1st |
| 10 November 1969 | Preston North End | A | 3–1 | Worthington (2), Lawson | 12,750 | 1st |
| 15 November 1969 | Portsmouth | H | 4–0 | Hutt, Hoy, Dobson, Cherry | 12,564 | 1st |
| 22 November 1969 | Swindon Town | A | 1–2 | Worthington | 19,279 | 1st |
| 6 December 1969 | Birmingham City | A | 2–2 | Worthington, Hoy | 24,956 | 2nd |
| 13 December 1969 | Blackpool | A | 0–2 | | 12,587 | 3rd |
| 26 December 1969 | Sheffield United | H | 2–1 | Smith (2) | 30,907 | 3rd |
| 27 December 1969 | Bristol City | A | 2–1 | Smith, Worthington | 20,541 | 1st |
| 17 January 1970 | Bolton Wanderers | A | 1–1 | McGill | 14,272 | 2nd |
| 20 January 1970 | Queens Park Rangers | H | 2–0 | Worthington (2) | 21,699 | 1st |
| 24 January 1970 | Cardiff City | H | 1–0 | Nicholson | 21,788 | 1st |
| 31 January 1970 | Carlisle United | H | 1–0 | Smith | 17,370 | 1st |
| 7 February 1970 | Charlton Athletic | A | 2–1 | Nicholson, Worthington | 10,964 | 1st |
| 21 February 1970 | Norwich City | H | 1–1 | Clarke | 16,060 | 1st |
| 24 February 1970 | Oxford United | H | 1–0 | Dobson (pen) | 17,481 | 1st |
| 28 February 1970 | Millwall | A | 0–1 | | 11,981 | 1st |
| 10 March 1970 | Leicester City | H | 1–1 | Worthington | 20,965 | 1st |
| 14 March 1970 | Cardiff City | A | 1–0 | Harris (og) | 26,004 | 1st |
| 21 March 1970 | Birmingham City | H | 2–0 | Lawson (2) | 18,502 | 1st |
| 24 March 1970 | Swindon Town | H | 1–1 | Krzywicki | 24,854 | 1st |
| 28 March 1970 | Portsmouth | A | 3–1 | Worthington, Krzywicki, Ellam | 17,326 | 1st |
| 30 March 1970 | Hull City | H | 2–2 | Smith, Cherry | 26,046 | 1st |
| 31 March 1970 | Middlesbrough | A | 1–1 | Smith | 27,519 | 1st |
| 4 April 1970 | Blackburn Rovers | A | 2–0 | Worthington (2) | 15,125 | 1st |
| 14 April 1970 | Watford | H | 3–1 | Krzywicki (2), Lawson | 27,916 | 1st |

=== FA Cup ===
| Date | Round | Opponents | Home/ Away | Result F–A | Scorers | Attendance |
|---|---|---|---|---|---|---|
| 3 January 1970 | Round 3 | Aldershot | H | 1–1 | Smith | 16,757 |
| 12 January 1970 | Round 3 Replay | Aldershot | A | 1–3 | Worthington | 14,332 |

=== Football League Cup ===
| Date | Round | Opponents | Home/ Away | Result F–A | Scorers | Attendance |
|---|---|---|---|---|---|---|
| 2 September 1969 | Round 2 | Carlisle United | A | 0–2 | | 11,198 |

== Appearances and goals ==
| Name | Nationality | Position | League | | FA Cup | | League Cup | | Total | |
| Name | Nationality | Position | Apps | Goals | Apps | Goals | Apps | Goals | Apps | Goals |
|---|---|---|---|---|---|---|---|---|---|---|
| Les Chapman | England | MF | 2 (8) | 0 | 1 | 0 | 0 | 0 | 3 (8) | 0 |
| Trevor Cherry | England | DF | 40 | 3 | 2 | 0 | 0 | 0 | 42 | 3 |
| Dennis Clarke | England | DF | 42 | 2 | 2 | 0 | 1 | 0 | 45 | 2 |
| Colin Dobson | England | FW | 31 | 9 | 1 | 0 | 1 | 0 | 33 | 9 |
| Roy Ellam | England | DF | 42 | 2 | 1 | 0 | 1 | 0 | 44 | 2 |
| Brian Greenhalgh | England | FW | 5 | 0 | 0 | 0 | 0 | 0 | 5 | 0 |
| Bobby Hoy | England | MF | 28 | 7 | 0 | 0 | 1 | 0 | 29 | 7 |
| Geoff Hutt | England | DF | 42 | 1 | 2 | 0 | 1 | 0 | 45 | 1 |
| Dick Krzywicki | Wales | MF | 5 (1) | 4 | 0 | 0 | 0 | 0 | 5 (1) | 4 |
| Jimmy Lawson | England | MF | 38 (2) | 6 | 2 | 0 | 1 | 0 | 41 (2) | 6 |
| Jimmy McGill | Scotland | MF | 42 | 4 | 2 | 0 | 0 | 0 | 44 | 4 |
| Ray Mielczarek | Wales | DF | 0 | 0 | 1 | 0 | 1 | 0 | 2 | 0 |
| Jimmy Nicholson | Northern Ireland | MF | 42 | 3 | 2 | 0 | 1 | 0 | 45 | 3 |
| Terry Poole | England | GK | 42 | 0 | 2 | 0 | 1 | 0 | 45 | 0 |
| Steve Smith | England | MF | 19 (4) | 5 | 2 | 1 | 1 | 0 | 22 (4) | 6 |
| Frank Worthington | England | FW | 42 | 18 | 2 | 1 | 1 | 0 | 45 | 19 |
