= 1967–68 Huddersfield Town A.F.C. season =

Huddersfield Town
1967–68 season
- Chairman: Roger B. Kaye
- Manager: Tom Johnston
- Stadium: Leeds Road
- Football League Second Division: 14th
- FA Cup: Third round (eliminated by Tranmere Rovers)
- Football League Cup: Semi-finals (eliminated by Arsenal)
- Top goalscorer: League: Colin Dobson (12); All: Colin Dobson (14)
- Highest home attendance: 27,312 vs Arsenal (6 February 1968)
- Lowest home attendance: 6,562 vs Plymouth Argyle (24 February 1968)
- Biggest win: 4–1 vs Charlton Athletic (30 March 1968)
- Biggest defeat: 1–6 vs Birmingham City (23 December 1967)

Huddersfield Town's 1967–68 campaign was a mainly mediocre season for the Town. Town finished the season in the mid-table position of 14th under Tom Johnston.

This season is most remembered by Town fans for their best ever run in the Football League Cup. They reached the semi-finals, before losing to 1st Division Arsenal 6–3 on aggregate.

== Squad at the start of the season ==
Note: Flags indicate national team as defined under FIFA eligibility rules; some limited exceptions apply. Players may hold more than one non-FIFA nationality.

Pos.	Nation	Player
GK	IRL	John Oldfield
DF	ENG	Chris Cattlin
DF	ENG	Trevor Cherry
DF	ENG	Roy Ellam
DF	ENG	Billy Legg
DF	IRL	Mick Meagan
DF	ENG	Derek Parkin
MF	ENG	Colin Dobson
MF	ENG	Mike Hellawell

Pos.	Nation	Player
MF	ENG	Brian Hill
MF	ENG	Kevin McHale
MF	NIR	Jimmy Nicholson
MF	ENG	Steve Smith
FW	ENG	Brian Clark
FW	SCO	Joe Harper
FW	ENG	Tony Leighton
FW	ENG	David Shaw
FW	ENG	Frank Worthington

== Review ==
Tom Johnston was beginning his 3rd full season in charge of the Terriers following a pretty impressive previous season, many were hoping that Town could possibly push for a promotion back to Division 1. After winning the first 2 games against Bristol City and Millwall, Town failed to win the next 7 games in the league and Town's league form never seemed to truly recover during the season.

Their Football League Cup campaign during the season is currently the best in Town's history. Following wins in the earlier rounds against Wolverhampton Wanderers, Norwich City, West Ham United and Fulham, Town played 1st Division Arsenal in the semi-finals of the competition. Following a narrow 3–2 defeat at Highbury in the first leg, some were thinking that a trip to Wembley wasn't out of the question. Tony Leighton gave Town an early lead in the second leg at Leeds Road, but the Gunners scored 3 further goals to secure their final berth at Town's expense. Town finished their league campaign in 14th place with only 38 points.

== Squad at the end of the season ==
Note: Flags indicate national team as defined under FIFA eligibility rules; some limited exceptions apply. Players may hold more than one non-FIFA nationality.

Pos.	Nation	Player
GK	IRL	John Oldfield
DF	ENG	Trevor Cherry
DF	ENG	Roy Ellam
DF	ENG	Billy Legg
DF	IRL	Mick Meagan
DF	WAL	Ray Mielczarek
DF	ENG	Alex Smith
MF	ENG	Colin Dobson
MF	ENG	Mike Hellawell
MF	ENG	Brian Hill

Pos.	Nation	Player
MF	SCO	Jimmy McGill
MF	NIR	Jimmy Nicholson
MF	ENG	Steve Smith
FW	ENG	Paul Aimson
FW	ENG	John Archer
FW	SCO	Joe Harper
FW	ENG	Bobby Hoy
FW	ENG	David Shaw
FW	ENG	Frank Worthington

== Results ==
=== Division Two ===
Date	Opponents	Home/ Away	Result F - A	Scorers	Attendance	Position
19 August 1967	Bristol City	A	3 - 2	Ellam, Nicholson, Harper	18,148	8th
22 August 1967	Millwall	H	1 - 0	Nicholson	13,832	1st
26 August 1967	Birmingham City	H	2 - 3	Dobson (2)	14,228	6th
29 August 1967	Millwall	A	1 - 1	Leighton	15,153	7th
2 September 1967	Bolton Wanderers	A	1 - 3	Hill	11,544	11th
4 September 1967	Blackpool	A	0 - 2		17,674	12th
9 September 1967	Portsmouth	H	2 - 2	Dobson (pen), Clark	11,107	14th
16 September 1967	Ipswich Town	H	1 - 4	Dobson (pen)	11,544	13th
23 September 1967	Carlisle United	A	1 - 2	Dobson	13,511	15th
30 September 1967	Blackburn Rovers	H	2 - 1	Clark, Coddington (og)	15,216	14th
7 October 1967	Plymouth Argyle	A	1 - 1	McGill	12,900	15th
14 October 1967	Rotherham United	H	2 - 0	Clark, Dobson	11,453	13th
21 October 1967	Derby County	A	0 - 1		23,950	15th
28 October 1967	Preston North End	H	1 - 1	Dobson	10,834	15th
11 November 1967	Crystal Palace	H	1 - 1	Dobson	10,055	15th
18 November 1967	Norwich City	A	1 - 0	Shaw	17,573	13th
25 November 1967	Queens Park Rangers	H	1 - 0	Worthington	14,615	13th
2 December 1967	Aston Villa	A	0 - 0		19,507	13th
9 December 1967	Cardiff City	H	1 - 0	Nicholson	8,552	11th
16 December 1967	Bristol City	H	0 - 3		12,071	14th
23 December 1967	Birmingham City	A	1 - 6	Worthington	26,163	14th
26 December 1967	Hull City	H	2 - 0	Leighton (2)	19,739	14th
30 December 1967	Hull City	A	1 - 1	Nicholson	17,656	13th
6 January 1968	Bolton Wanderers	H	1 - 1	Dobson	14,147	11th
13 January 1968	Portsmouth	A	1 - 3	Shaw	17,647	13th
29 January 1968	Ipswich Town	A	0 - 2		14,945	16th
3 February 1968	Carlisle United	H	1 - 1	Dobson	9,071	16th
14 February 1968	Blackburn Rovers	A	0 - 0		11,796	15th
17 February 1968	Charlton Athletic	A	2 - 4	McGill, Worthington	13,550	16th
24 February 1968	Plymouth Argyle	H	0 - 1		6,562	17th
2 March 1968	Rotherham United	A	0 - 1		13,672	17th
16 March 1968	Derby County	H	3 - 1	Harper, Aimson, Dobson	9,326	17th
23 March 1968	Preston North End	A	1 - 3	Mielczarek	13,504	18th
30 March 1968	Charlton Athletic	H	4 - 1	Harper, Nicholson, Aimson (2)	7,742	16th
6 April 1968	Crystal Palace	A	1 - 0	Worthington	10,929	15th
13 April 1968	Norwich City	H	2 - 0	Hill, Worthington	9,727	12th
15 April 1968	Middlesbrough	A	2 - 3	Dobson, Aimson	15,065	12th
16 April 1968	Middlesbrough	H	1 - 0	Aimson	12,709	11th
20 April 1968	Queens Park Rangers	A	0 - 3		19,646	14th
27 April 1968	Aston Villa	H	0 - 0		7,489	15th
4 May 1968	Cardiff City	A	0 - 0		10,669	12th
11 May 1968	Blackpool	H	1 - 3	Legg	11,603	13th

=== FA Cup ===
Date	Round	Opponents	Home/ Away	Result F - A	Scorers	Attendance
27 January 1968	Round 3	Tranmere Rovers	A	1 - 2	Worthington	20,038

=== Football League Cup ===
Date	Round	Opponents	Home/ Away	Result F - A	Scorers	Attendance
12 September 1967	Round 2	Wolverhampton Wanderers	H	1 - 0	Dobson	11,850
11 October 1967	Round 3	Norwich City	A	1 - 0	Nicholson	12,215
1 November 1967	Round 4	West Ham United	H	2 - 0	Worthington, Cattlin	17,729
29 November 1967	Round 5	Fulham	A	1 - 1	Worthington	20,309
12 December 1967	Round 5 Replay	Fulham	H	2 - 1	Nicholson, Shaw	23,801
17 January 1968	Semi-Final 1st Leg	Arsenal	A	2 - 3	Cherry, Dobson	40,079
6 February 1968	Semi-Final 2nd Leg	Arsenal	H	1 - 3	Leighton	27,312: Huddersfield lost 6–3 on aggregate.

== Appearances and goals ==
Name	Nationality	Position	League		FA Cup		League Cup		Total	
Name	Nationality	Position	Apps	Goals	Apps	Goals	Apps	Goals	Apps	Goals
Paul Aimson	England	FW	10	5	0	0	0	0	10	5
John Archer	England	FW	7 (2)	0	0	0	0	0	7 (2)	0
Chris Cattlin	England	DF	23	0	1	0	7	1	31	1
Trevor Cherry	England	DF	24 (2)	0	0	0	3	1	27 (2)	1
Brian Clark	England	FW	8 (2)	3	0	0	2	0	10 (2)	3
Colin Dobson	England	FW	37 (2)	12	1	0	7	2	45 (2)	14
Roy Ellam	England	DF	24	1	0	0	7	0	31	1
Joe Harper	Scotland	MF	21 (2)	3	0	0	1 (1)	0	22 (3)	3
Mike Hellawell	England	MF	14 (1)	0	1	0	6	0	21 (1)	0
Brian Hill	England	MF	38 (1)	2	1	0	7	0	46 (1)	2
Bobby Hoy	England	MF	2	0	0	0	0	0	2	0
Billy Legg	England	DF	19 (2)	1	0	0	0	0	19 (2)	1
Tony Leighton	England	FW	9 (1)	3	0	0	1	1	10 (1)	4
Jimmy McGill	Scotland	MF	29 (1)	2	1	0	4 (1)	0	34 (2)	2
Kevin McHale	England	MF	7	0	0	0	0	0	7	0
Mick Meagan	Republic of Ireland	DF	19	0	1	0	5	0	25	0
Ray Mielczarek	Wales	DF	19 (1)	1	1	0	0	0	20 (1)	1
Jimmy Nicholson	Northern Ireland	MF	37	5	1	0	7	2	45	7
John Oldfield	Republic of Ireland	GK	42	0	1	0	7	0	50	0
Derek Parkin	England	DF	27	0	1	0	7	0	35	0
David Shaw	England	MF	14 (2)	2	0	0	1	1	15 (2)	3
Alex Smith	England	DF	1	0	0	0	0	0	1	0
Steve Smith	England	MF	4	0	0	0	0	0	4	0
Frank Worthington	England	FW	27 (2)	5	1	1	5	2	33 (2)	8
