= 1966–67 Huddersfield Town A.F.C. season =

Huddersfield Town
1966–67 season
- Chairman: Roger B. Kaye
- Manager: Tom Johnston
- Stadium: Leeds Road
- Football League Second Division: 6th
- FA Cup: Third round (eliminated by Chelsea)
- Football League Cup: Second round (eliminated by Lincoln City)
- Top goalscorer: League: Tony Leighton (18); All: Tony Leighton (20)
- Highest home attendance: 36,494 vs Chelsea (28 January 1967)
- Lowest home attendance: 3,847 vs Cardiff City (13 May 1967)
- Biggest win: 4–1 vs Charlton Athletic (17 September 1966); 3–0 vs Rotherham United (4 March 1967)
- Biggest defeat: 0–3 vs Ipswich Town (23 August 1966)

The 1966–67 Huddersfield Town season was a mainly successful season for the Town. Town finished the season in 6th place under Tom Johnston.

== Squad at the start of the season ==
Note: Flags indicate national team as defined under FIFA eligibility rules; some limited exceptions apply. Players may hold more than one non-FIFA nationality.

Pos.	Nation	Player
GK	ENG	Peter Goy
GK	IRL	John Oldfield
DF	ENG	Denis Atkins
DF	ENG	Chris Cattlin
DF	ENG	John Coddington
DF	ENG	Roy Ellam
DF	ENG	Bob McNab
DF	IRL	Mick Meagan
DF	ENG	Derek Parkin
MF	ENG	Peter Dinsdale
MF	ENG	Billy Lynn

Pos.	Nation	Player
MF	ENG	Kevin McHale
MF	NIR	Jimmy Nicholson
MF	SCO	Johnny Quigley
MF	ENG	Steve Smith
MF	ENG	Ray Veall
MF	ENG	Bob Wallace
FW	ENG	Tony Leighton
FW	SCO	Les Massie
FW	ENG	John Rudge
FW	ENG	Don Weston

== Review ==
Tom Johnston tried to improve on the previous season's 4th place in the league. Their start was mixed with around as many wins as losses. The mid-part of the season saw Town go on an impressive run of only 2 defeats in 18 league games between November and mid-March. The end of the season saw a slight drop in form which more or less lost Town's chances of gaining promotion to Division 1. The rise up the table was helped by the goals of Colin Dobson and Tony Leighton, who scored 35 league goals between them.

They finished in 6th place with 49 points, 9 points behind 2nd placed Wolverhampton Wanderers.

== Squad at the end of the season ==
Note: Flags indicate national team as defined under FIFA eligibility rules; some limited exceptions apply. Players may hold more than one non-FIFA nationality.

Pos.	Nation	Player
GK	IRL	John Oldfield
DF	ENG	Denis Atkins
DF	ENG	Chris Cattlin
DF	ENG	Trevor Cherry
DF	ENG	John Coddington
DF	ENG	Roy Ellam
DF	ENG	Billy Legg
DF	IRL	Mick Meagan
DF	ENG	Derek Parkin
MF	ENG	Peter Dinsdale
MF	ENG	Colin Dobson
MF	ENG	Mike Hellawell

Pos.	Nation	Player
MF	ENG	Brian Hill
MF	ENG	Bobby Hoy
MF	ENG	Kevin McHale
MF	NIR	Jimmy Nicholson
MF	ENG	Steve Smith
MF	ENG	Ray Veall
FW	ENG	Brian Clark
FW	SCO	Joe Harper
FW	ENG	Tony Leighton
FW	ENG	David Shaw
FW	ENG	Frank Worthington

== Results ==
=== Division Two ===
Date	Opponents	Home/ Away	Result F - A	Scorers	Attendance	Position
20 August 1966	Bristol City	H	2 - 0	Briggs (og), Weston	10,123	1st
23 August 1966	Ipswich Town	A	0 - 3		13,570	10th
27 August 1966	Carlisle United	A	1 - 2	Parkin	10,322	14th
30 August 1966	Ipswich Town	H	1 - 0	Dobson	12,434	8th
3 September 1966	Blackburn Rovers	H	3 - 1	Leighton (2), Dobson	15,685	7th
7 September 1966	Cardiff City	A	1 - 1	Smith	10,473	7th
10 September 1966	Bolton Wanderers	A	0 - 1		17,600	10th
17 September 1966	Charlton Athletic	H	4 - 1	Dobson (2), Leighton (2)	10,903	8th
24 September 1966	Derby County	A	3 - 4	Leighton (2), Dobson (pen)	15,029	10th
1 October 1966	Crystal Palace	H	0 - 2		12,609	14th
8 October 1966	Plymouth Argyle	H	1 - 1	Dobson	11,248	14th
15 October 1966	Northampton Town	A	1 - 0	Leighton	13,355	13th
22 October 1966	Millwall	H	2 - 0	Dobson (pen), Leighton	12,205	10th
29 October 1966	Rotherham United	A	2 - 4	Leighton, Clark	13,845	12th
5 November 1966	Preston North End	H	1 - 0	Leighton	13,624	11th
12 November 1966	Bury	A	0 - 0		8,845	11th
19 November 1966	Coventry City	H	3 - 1	Dobson, Leighton, Meagan	15,192	8th
26 November 1966	Norwich City	A	0 - 0		14,854	10th
3 December 1966	Birmingham City	H	3 - 1	Clark, Dobson (pen), Nicholson	14,930	8th
10 December 1966	Portsmouth	A	1 - 1	Dobson	13,174	6th
17 December 1966	Bristol City	A	1 - 1	Nicholson	11,299	8th
26 December 1966	Hull City	A	0 - 2		35,630	11th
27 December 1966	Hull City	H	1 - 0	Leighton	32,268	9th
31 December 1966	Carlisle United	H	1 - 1	Leighton	18,606	9th
14 January 1967	Bolton Wanderers	H	2 - 1	Dobson, Leighton	18,176	8th
21 January 1967	Charlton Athletic	A	2 - 1	Dobson, Hellawell	12,105	4th
4 February 1967	Derby County	H	1 - 0	Leighton	17,999	3rd
11 February 1967	Crystal Palace	A	1 - 1	Coddington	18,927	4th
18 February 1967	Blackburn Rovers	A	0 - 2		19,647	5th
25 February 1967	Plymouth Argyle	A	3 - 2	Clark, Hill, Cattlin	12,734	4th
4 March 1967	Rotherham United	H	3 - 0	Leighton (3)	20,106	4th
18 March 1967	Millwall	A	3 - 1	Clark (2), Dobson	12,718	4th
25 March 1967	Northampton Town	H	0 - 2		18,214	4th
27 March 1967	Wolverhampton Wanderers	H	0 - 1		28,829	4th
28 March 1967	Wolverhampton Wanderers	A	0 - 1		40,429	7th
1 April 1967	Preston North End	A	2 - 1	Clark, Harper	14,161	6th
8 April 1967	Bury	H	4 - 2	Clark, Hill, Leighton, Dobson (pen)	8,798	5th
15 April 1967	Coventry City	A	0 - 1		29,683	6th
22 April 1967	Norwich City	H	0 - 1		10,041	6th
28 April 1967	Birmingham City	A	1 - 0	Hoy	14,385	6th
6 May 1967	Portsmouth	H	1 - 1	Dobson (pen)	7,149	6th
13 May 1967	Cardiff City	H	3 - 1	McHale, Dobson (pen), Clark	3,847	6th

=== FA Cup ===
Date	Round	Opponents	Home/ Away	Result F - A	Scorers	Attendance
28 January 1967	Round 3	Chelsea	H	1 - 2	Leighton	36,494

=== Football League Cup ===
Date	Round	Opponents	Home/ Away	Result F - A	Scorers	Attendance
14 September 1966	Round 2	Lincoln City	A	1 - 2	Leighton	6,442

== Appearances and goals ==
Name	Nationality	Position	League		FA Cup		League Cup		Total	
Name	Nationality	Position	Apps	Goals	Apps	Goals	Apps	Goals	Apps	Goals
Denis Atkins	England	DF	11	0	0	0	1	0	12	0
Chris Cattlin	England	DF	35 (1)	1	1	0	0	0	36 (1)	1
Trevor Cherry	England	DF	2 (1)	0	0	0	0	0	2 (1)	0
Brian Clark	England	FW	20 (2)	8	0	0	0	0	20 (2)	8
John Coddington	England	DF	36	1	1	0	1	0	38	1
Peter Dinsdale	England	DF	10	0	0	0	1	0	11	0
Colin Dobson	England	FW	37	17	1	0	1	0	39	17
Roy Ellam	England	DF	15	0	0	0	1	0	16	0
Peter Goy	England	GK	4	0	0	0	0	0	4	0
Joe Harper	Scotland	MF	5	1	0	0	0	0	5	1
Mike Hellawell	England	MF	31	1	1	0	0	0	32	1
Brian Hill	England	MF	27	2	1	0	0	0	28	2
Bobby Hoy	England	MF	1	1	0	0	0	0	1	1
Billy Legg	England	DF	1	0	0	0	0	0	1	0
Tony Leighton	England	FW	35	18	1	1	1	1	37	20
Billy Lynn	England	MF	1	0	0	0	0	0	1	0
Les Massie	Scotland	FW	0 (1)	0	0	0	0	0	0 (1)	0
Kevin McHale	England	MF	5	1	0	0	0	0	5	1
Bob McNab	England	DF	5	0	0	0	1	0	6	0
Mick Meagan	Republic of Ireland	DF	34	1	1	0	0	0	35	1
Jimmy Nicholson	Northern Ireland	MF	33	2	1	0	0	0	34	2
John Oldfield	Republic of Ireland	GK	38	0	1	0	1	0	40	0
Derek Parkin	England	DF	32 (1)	1	1	0	0	0	33 (1)	1
Johnny Quigley	Scotland	MF	10 (1)	0	0	0	1	0	11 (1)	0
John Rudge	England	MF	2	0	0	0	0	0	2	0
David Shaw	England	MF	3	0	0	0	0	0	3	0
Steve Smith	England	MF	13 (3)	1	1	0	1	0	15 (3)	1
Ray Veall	England	MF	1	0	0	0	0	0	1	0
Bob Wallace	England	MF	4	0	0	0	0	0	4	0
Don Weston	England	FW	9	1	0	0	0	0	9	1
Frank Worthington	England	FW	2 (1)	0	0	0	0	0	2 (1)	0
