= List of Huddersfield Town A.F.C. seasons =

Chart of Huddersfield Town League Performances

This is a list of all the seasons played by Huddersfield Town Association Football Club in English football from 1908, when the club was formed.

== Seasons ==
Season	League									FA Cup	EFL Cup	Europe/Other		Top goalscorer(s) (Note: Goals in all competitions (Premier League/English Football League, FA Cup, EFL Cup and EFL Trophy) are counted.)	
Season	Division	Pld	W	D	L	GF	GA	Pts	Pos	FA Cup	EFL Cup	Europe/Other		Player(s)	Goals
1908–09	NEL	34	10	4	20	47	78	24	16th	— (Note: The team were formed too late to enter the competition.)				Harry Wallace	7
1909–10	MFL	42	22	6	14	92	76	50	5th	4QR				Jack Foster	25
1910–11	Div 2	38	13	8	17	57	58	34	13th	4QR				James Richardson	15
1911–12	Div 2	38	13	6	19	50	64	32	17th	R1				James Macauley	12
1912–13	Div 2	38	17	9	12	66	40	43	5th	R2				Frank Mann	16
1913–14	Div 2	38	13	8	17	47	53	34	13th	R2				Frank Mann	10
1914–15	Div 2	38	17	8	13	61	42	42	8th	R1				Ralph Shields	16
No competitive football was played between 1915 and 1919 due to World War I
1919–20	Div 2	42	28	8	6	97	38	64	2nd	R/U				Sammy Taylor	41
1920–21	Div 1	42	15	9	18	42	49	39	17th	R3				Jack Swann	8
1921–22	Div 1	42	15	9	18	53	54	39	14th	W		Charity Shield	W	Ernie Islip; Clem Stephenson	15
1922–23	Div 1	42	21	11	10	60	32	53	3rd	R3				Charlie Wilson	16
1923–24	Div 1	42	23	11	8	60	33	57	1st	R3				Charlie Wilson	20
1924–25	Div 1	42	21	16	5	69	28	58	1st	R1		Charity Shield	— (Note: Never played 1924 FA Cup Winners Newcastle United.)	Charlie Wilson	24
1925–26	Div 1	42	23	11	8	92	60	57	1st	R4		Charity Shield	— (Note: Never played 1925 FA Cup Winners Sheffield United.)	George Brown	35
1926–27	Div 1	42	17	17	8	76	60	51	2nd	R3		Charity Shield	— (Note: Never played 1926 FA Cup Winners Bolton Wanderers.)	George Brown	28
1927–28	Div 1	42	22	7	13	91	68	51	2nd	R/U				George Brown	35
1928–29	Div 1	42	14	11	17	70	61	39	16th	SF				George Brown	23
1929–30	Div 1	42	17	9	16	63	69	43	10th	R/U				Alex Jackson	17
1930–31	Div 1	42	18	12	12	81	65	48	5th	R3				Joe Robson	18
1931–32	Div 1	42	19	10	13	80	63	48	4th	QF				Dave Mangnall	42
1932–33	Div 1	42	18	11	13	66	53	47	6th	R4				George McLean	11
1933–34	Div 1	42	23	10	9	90	61	56	2nd	R4				George McLean	20
1934–35	Div 1	42	14	10	18	76	71	38	16th	R3				Alf Lythgoe	23
1935–36	Div 1	42	18	12	12	59	56	48	3rd	R4				Alf Lythgoe	15
1936–37	Div 1	42	12	15	15	62	64	39	15th	R3				Jimmy Richardson	11
1937–38	Div 1	42	17	5	20	55	68	39	15th	R/U				Bobby Barclay	14
1938–39	Div 1	42	12	11	19	58	64	35	19th	SF				Billy Price	24
1939–40 (Note: The 1939–40 season was abandoned in early September and all results annulled, after only three matches had been played; Huddersfield Town were seventeenth in the table at the time.)	Div 1	3	1	0	2	2	3	2	17th	—				Billy Price	1
No competitive football was played between 1939 and 1946 due to World War II
1945–46	n/a (Note: The FA Cup was contested in 1945–46 but The Football League did not resume until the following season.)									R3				Billy Price	1
1946–47	Div 1	42	13	7	22	53	79	33	20th	R3				Jimmy Glazzard	11
1947–48	Div 1	42	12	12	18	51	60	36	19th	R3				Peter Doherty	13
1948–49	Div 1	42	12	10	20	40	69	34	20th	R4				Peter Doherty	14
1949–50	Div 1	42	14	9	19	52	73	37	15th	R3				Vic Metcalfe; Jeff Taylor	11
1950–51	Div 1	42	15	6	21	64	92	36	19th	R5				Harold Hassall	18
1951–52	Div 1	42	10	8	24	49	82	28	21st	R3				Jimmy Glazzard	10
1952–53	Div 2	42	24	10	8	84	33	58	2nd	R4				Jimmy Glazzard	31
1953–54	Div 1	42	20	11	11	76	61	51	3rd	R3				Jimmy Glazzard	29
1954–55	Div 1	42	14	13	15	63	68	41	12th	QF				Jimmy Glazzard	32
1955–56	Div 1	42	14	7	21	54	83	35	21st	R3				Jimmy Glazzard	11
1956–57	Div 2	42	18	6	18	68	74	42	12th	R5				Dave Hickson	22
1957–58	Div 2	42	14	16	12	63	66	44	9th	R3				Les Massie	13
1958–59	Div 2	42	16	8	18	62	55	40	14th	R3				Les Massie	15
1959–60	Div 2	42	19	9	14	73	52	47	6th	R4				Les Massie	22
1960–61	Div 2	42	13	9	20	62	71	35	20th	R4	R2			Derek Stokes	18
1961–62	Div 2	42	16	12	14	67	59	44	7th	R4	R2			Derek Stokes	14
1962–63	Div 2	42	17	14	11	63	50	48	6th	R3	R2			Derek Stokes	18
1963–64	Div 2	42	15	10	17	57	64	40	12th	R5	R3			Derek Stokes	16
1964–65	Div 2	42	17	10	15	53	51	44	8th	R4	R2			Les Massie	11
1965–66	Div 2	42	19	13	10	62	36	51	4th	R5	R3			Allan Gilliver	18
1966–67	Div 2	42	20	9	13	58	46	49	6th	R3	R2			Tony Leighton	20
1967–68	Div 2	42	13	12	17	46	61	38	14th	R3	SF			Colin Dobson	14
1968–69	Div 2	42	17	12	13	53	46	46	6th	R4	R2			Colin Dobson	11
1969–70	Div 2	42	24	12	6	68	37	60	1st	R3	R2			Frank Worthington	19
1970–71	Div 1	42	11	14	17	40	49	36	15th	R4	R2			Frank Worthington	12
1971–72	Div 1	42	6	13	23	27	59	25	22nd	QF	R2			Jimmy Lawson	12
1972–73	Div 2	46	8	17	21	36	56	33	21st	R3	R2			Alan Gowling	17
1973–74	Div 3	46	17	13	16	56	55	47	10th	R2	R1			Alan Gowling	25
1974–75	Div 3	46	11	10	25	47	76	32	24th	R1	R2			Alan Gowling	19
1975–76	Div 4	46	21	14	11	56	41	56	5th	R4	R2			Terry Gray	19
1976–77	Div 4	46	19	12	15	60	49	50	9th	R1	R3			Kevin Johnson	13
1977–78	Div 4	46	15	15	16	63	55	45	11th (Note: Lowest League finish.)	R1	R2			Mick Butler	19
1978–79	Div 4	46	18	11	17	57	53	47	9th	R1	R1			Ian Robins	16
1979–80	Div 4	46	27	12	7	101	48	66	1st	R1	R2			Ian Robins	27
1980–81	Div 3	46	21	14	11	71	40	56	4th	R3	R1			Steve Kindon	19
1981–82	Div 3	46	15	12	15	64	59	57 (Note: The 1981–82 season saw the introduction of three points for a win.)	17th	R4	R2			Peter Fletcher	14
1982–83	Div 3	46	23	13	10	84	49	82	3rd	R3	R4			Mark Lillis	20
1983–84	Div 2	42	14	15	13	56	49	57	12th	R4	R3			Mark Lillis	14
1984–85	Div 2	42	15	12	15	52	64	55	13th	R4	R2			Mark Lillis; Dale Tempest	16
1985–86	Div 2	42	14	10	18	51	67	52	16th	R3	R2			Dale Tempest	13
1986–87	Div 2	42	13	12	17	54	61	51	17th	R3	R2	Full Members' Cup	R1	Duncan Shearer	25
1987–88	Div 2	44	6	10	28	41	100	28	23rd	R3	R1	Full Members' Cup	R1	Duncan Shearer	16
1988–89	Div 3	46	17	9	20	63	73	60	14th	R3	R1	Football League Trophy	NQF	Craig Maskell	33
1989–90	Div 3	46	17	14	15	61	62	65	8th	R4	R2	Football League Trophy	R1	Craig Maskell	20
1990–91	Div 3	46	18	13	15	57	51	67	11th	R2	R1	Football League Trophy	PR	Kieran O'Regan; Iwan Roberts	14
1991–92	Div 3	46	22	12	12	59	38	78	3rd	R3	R3	Football League Trophy	NSF	Iwan Roberts	35
1992–93	Div 2 (Note: The 1992–93 season saw the introduction of the Premier League, so Division 1 replaced Division 2, Division 2 replaced Division 3 & Division 3 replaced Division 4.)	46	17	9	20	54	61	60	15th	R4	R2	Football League Trophy	NSF	Iwan Roberts	15
1993–94	Div 2	46	17	14	15	58	61	65	11th	R2	R2	Football League Trophy	R/U	Phil Starbuck	16
1994–95 (Note: The 1994–95 season was Town's first season at the Kirklees Stadium.)	Div 2	46	22	15	9	79	49	81	5th (Note: Promoted by the Play-offs at Wembley Stadium, London.)	R2	R2	Football League Trophy	NQF	Andy Booth	30
1995–96	Div 1	46	17	12	17	61	58	63	8th	R5	R2			Andy Booth	21
1996–97	Div 1	46	13	15	18	48	61	54	20th	R3	R3			Andy Payton	19
1997–98	Div 1	46	14	11	21	50	72	53	16th	R4	R2			Marcus Stewart	16
1998–99	Div 1	46	15	16	15	62	71	61	10th	R5	R2			Marcus Stewart	26
1999–2000	Div 1	46	21	11	14	62	49	74	8th	R3	R4			Clyde Wijnhard	16
2000–01	Div 1	46	11	15	20	48	57	48	22nd	R3	R1			Delroy Facey; Kevin Gallen	10
2001–02	Div 2	46	21	15	10	65	47	78	6th	R2	R1	Football League Trophy	NF	Leon Knight	17
2002–03	Div 2	46	11	12	23	39	61	45	22nd	R1	R2	Football League Trophy	R1	Martin Smith	17
2003–04	Div 3	46	23	12	11	68	52	81	4th (Note: Promoted by the Play-offs at the Millennium Stadium, Cardiff.)	R1	R3	Football League Trophy	R2	Jon Stead	18
2004–05	Lge 1 (Note: The 2004–05 season saw the rebranding of Divisions 1–3, so Division 1 became The Championship, Division 2 became League One & Division 3 became League Two.)	46	20	10	16	74	65	70	9th	R1	R1	Football League Trophy	R2	Paweł Abbott	27
2005–06	Lge 1	46	19	16	11	72	59	73	4th	R3	R2	Football League Trophy	R1	Andy Booth; Gary Taylor-Fletcher	15
2006–07	Lge 1	46	14	17	15	60	69	59	15th	R1	R1	Football League Trophy	R1	Luke Beckett	15
2007–08	Lge 1	46	20	6	20	50	62	66	10th	R5	R1	Football League Trophy	R1	Luke Beckett	12
2008–09	Lge 1	46	18	14	14	62	65	68	9th	R1	R2	Football League Trophy	R2	Gary Roberts	11
2009–10	Lge 1	46	23	11	12	82	56	80	6th	R3	R2	Football League Trophy	R2	Jordan Rhodes	23
2010–11	Lge 1	46	25	12	9	77	48	87	3rd	R4	R2	Football League Trophy	NF	Jordan Rhodes	22
2011–12	Lge 1	46	21	18	7	79	47	81	4th (Note: Promoted by the Play-offs at (the new) Wembley Stadium, London.)	R1	R2	Football League Trophy	R2	Jordan Rhodes	40
2012–13	Champ	46	15	13	18	53	73	58	19th	R5	R1			James Vaughan	14
2013–14	Champ	46	14	11	21	58	65	53	17th	R4	R3			James Vaughan	12
2014–15	Champ	46	13	16	17	58	75	55	16th	R3	R2			Nahki Wells	14
2015–16	Champ	46	13	12	21	59	70	51	19th	R3	R1			Nahki Wells	18
2016–17	Champ	46	25	6	15	56	58	81	5th (Note: Promoted by the Play-offs at Wembley Stadium, London.)	R5	R1			Elias Kachunga	13
2017–18	Prem	38	9	10	19	28	58	37	16th	R5	R3			Steve Mounié	9
2018–19	Prem	38	3	7	28	22	76	16	20th	R3	R2			Karlan Grant	4
2019–20	Champ	46	13	12	21	52	70	51	18th	R3	R1			Karlan Grant	19
2020–21	Champ	46	12	13	21	50	71	49	20th	R3	R1			Josh Koroma	8
2021–22	Champ	46	23	13	10	64	47	82	3rd	R5	R2			Danny Ward	14
2022–23	Champ	46	14	11	21	47	62	53	18th	R3	R1			Jordan Rhodes	6
2023–24	Champ	46	9	18	19	48	77	45	23rd	R3	R1			Michał Helik	9
2024–25	Lge 1	46	19	7	20	58	55	64	10th	R1	R2	Football League Trophy	R1	Josh Koroma	10
2025–26	Lge 1	46	18	13	15	74	64	67	9th	R1	R3	Football League Trophy	QF	Leo Castledine	12

- 32 seasons in Level 1 of English football league system
- 42 seasons in Level 2 of English football league system
- 22 seasons in Level 3 of English football league system
- 6 seasons in Level 4 of English football league system

== Key ==
- Pld = Matches played
- W = Matches won
- D = Matches drawn
- L = Matches lost
- GF = Goals for
- GA = Goals against
- Pts = Points
- Pos = Final position
- NEL = North Eastern League
- ML = Midland Football League
- Div 1 = Football League First Division
- Div 2 = Football League Second Division
- Div 3 = Football League Third Division
- Div 4 = Football League Fourth Division
- Prem = Premier League
- Champ = EFL Championship
- Lge 1 = EFL League One
- 4QR = 4th Qualifying Round
- PR = Preliminary Round
- R1 = Round 1
- R2 = Round 2
- R3 = Round 3
- R4 = Round 4
- R5 = Round 5
- QF = Quarter-finals
- NQF = Northern Quarter-finals
- SF = Semi-finals
- NSF = Northern Semi-finals
- NF = Northern Final
- R/U = Runners-up
- W = Winners

Champions	Runners-up	Third-place	Play-offs	Promoted	Relegated
