= Colin Dobson =

English footballer (1940–2023)

Personal information
- Full name: Colin Dobson
- Date of birth: 9 May 1940
- Place of birth: Eston, England
- Date of death: 16 February 2023 (aged 82)
- Place of death: Middlesbrough, England
- Height: 5 ft 8 in (1.73 m)
- Position: Inside forward

Youth career
- 1955–1957: Sheffield Wednesday

Senior career*
Years	Team	Apps	(Gls)
1957–1966	Sheffield Wednesday	177	(49)
1966–1972	Huddersfield Town	155	(50)
1972	→ Brighton & Hove Albion (loan)	4	(0)
1972–1976	Bristol Rovers	62	(4)
Total		398	(103)

International career
1961	England U23	2	(0)

Managerial career
- 1984–1985: West Riffa
- 1985–1987: Al Rayyan
- 1994–1995: Al Arabi
- 1997: Oman U17
- * Club domestic league appearances and goals

Colin Dobson (9 May 1940 – 16 February 2023) was an English professional footballer who played as an inside-forward. He also had a long career in coaching and coached domestic and national teams in Arabia.

Dobson began his career with Sheffield Wednesday in 1961 and went on to score 52 goals in 193 games for the First Division club. He was sold to Huddersfield Town for a £20,000 fee in August 1966 and helped the club to the Second Division title in 1969–70. He was loaned out to Brighton & Hove Albion in 1972 before joining Bristol Rovers as a player-coach in the summer. He was promoted out of the Third Division with Rovers in 1973–74. Over 15 years in the Football League, he scored 103 goals in 398 league appearances. He also won two caps for the England under-23s.

After retiring as a player, he embarked on an extensive career in coaching and scouting. He has managed the Bahraini club West Riffa, Qatari club Al Rayyan, Kuwaiti side Al Arabi, as well as the Oman under-17s. He has worked behind the scenes for Bristol Rovers, Coventry City, Port Vale, Aston Villa, Sporting Lisbon (Portugal), Gillingham, Stoke City, and Watford.

== Club career ==
=== Sheffield Wednesday ===
At 15, Dobson began his career at Sheffield Wednesday. He became a part-time professional in November 1957 and turned fully professional in 1961. Wednesday finished the 1961–62 season in sixth place in the First Division under the stewardship of Vic Buckingham. He scored one goal in the 1961–62 Inter-Cities Fairs Cup, in a 5–2 home victory over Lyon; Wednesday went on to reach the quarter-finals, where they were knocked out by Barcelona after a 2–0 defeat at Camp Nou. The "Owls" again posted sixth-place finishes in 1962–63 and 1963–64, before slipping to eighth position in 1964–65 under new boss Alan Brown. They dropped down to 17th spot in 1965–66. He was not selected for the 1966 FA Cup final defeat to Everton. In league and cup competitions, Dobson scored 52 goals in 193 first-team appearances at Hillsborough.

=== Huddersfield Town ===
Dobson moved on to Tom Johnston's Huddersfield Town for a £20,000 fee in August 1966. He made a significant impact with 17 goals in 39 games in the 1966–67 season; strike partner Tony Leighton also claimed 20 goals to help Town to a sixth-place finish in the Second Division. Dobson finished as the club's top-scorer with 14 goals in 47 games in the 1967–68 campaign, including one in the League Cup semi-final defeat to Arsenal at Highbury. He was then a top-scorer for a second time as he bagged 11 goals in 43 matches in the 1968–69 season, as new boss Ian Greaves took the "Terriers" to within ten points of promotion. Dobson built a successful partnership with Frank Worthington and claimed nine goals in his 33 appearances as promotion was achieved with a first-place finish in 1969–70. However, he appeared just 12 times in the 1970–71 campaign, claiming one goal, and departed Leeds Road at the end of the season. He also played four Third Division games at Pat Saward's Brighton & Hove Albion in January 1972 on a loan deal that was expected to be made permanent. However, he fractured his ankle in the last of these games, his full home debut against Walsall on 12 February.

=== Bristol Rovers ===
In June 1972, Dobson signed with Bristol Rovers as a player-coach, having been a former teammate of manager Don Megson at Sheffield Wednesday. He had to wait until 24 November before he made his debut for the club, in a match against Southend United. Rovers finished fifth in the Third Division in 1972–73, before winning promotion in second place in 1973–74. The team avoided relegation by a three-point margin in 1974–75 and then by a five-point margin in 1975–76. He scored four goals in 63 league and cup games during his time at the Eastville Stadium.

== International career ==
Dobson won two England under-23 caps in 1961, making his debut as a substitute for Alan Suddick as England beat Yugoslavia 4–2 in Belgrade on 29 May; his second cap came against Romania four days later. In the summer of 1968, he was selected by the Football Association for a Commonwealth tour of the United States, New Zealand, Malaysia and Hong Kong.

== Style of play ==
Dobson was a skilful and pacey inside-forward.

== Coaching career ==
Dobson left Bristol Rovers to become the youth coach at Coventry City in May 1976. He acted as Port Vale's coach voluntarily from December 1983 to March 1984 to help out former teammate turned manager John Rudge before managing West Riffa in Bahrain. Later he became the coach of Qatari side Al Rayyan, before returning to England to take up the youth coach position at Aston Villa. He also was the youth coach at Portuguese Sporting Lisbon, the youth coach and chief scout at Gillingham, a coach back at the Coventry City youth set-up, before taking up the position as first-team coach of Kuwaiti Al Arabi. In September 1995, he returned to Port Vale as a temporary coach and departed Vale Park again in May 1996. He went on to coach Oman at the 1997 FIFA U-17 World Championship in Egypt. He later worked as chief scout at Stoke City and was credited with the discovery of England international goalkeeper Ben Foster. He was appointed chief scout at the Britannia Stadium in 2000 by director of football John Rudge, but left to scout for Watford in June 2005, only to return to the "Potters" by 2008. He left the club in June 2013.

== Death ==
Dobson died in Middlesbrough on 16 February 2023, at age 82.

== Career statistics ==
Appearances and goals by club, season, and competition
Club	Season	League			FA Cup		Other (Note: Includes League Cup, Football League Trophy, English Football League play-offs and Full Members Cup.)		Total	
Club	Season	Division	Apps	Goals	Apps	Goals	Apps	Goals	Apps	Goals
Sheffield Wednesday	1961–62	First Division	28	11	2	0	3	1	33	12
Sheffield Wednesday	1962–63	First Division	38	14	3	0	0	0	41	14
Sheffield Wednesday	1963–64	First Division	36	11	1	0	2	1	39	12
Sheffield Wednesday	1964–65	First Division	42	9	2	0	0	0	44	9
Sheffield Wednesday	1965–66	First Division	33	4	3	1	0	0	36	5
Sheffield Wednesday	Total		177	49	11	1	5	2	193	52
Huddersfield Town	1966–67	Second Division	37	17	1	0	1	0	39	17
Huddersfield Town	1967–68	Second Division	39	12	1	0	7	2	47	14
Huddersfield Town	1968–69	Second Division	39	11	2	0	2	0	43	11
Huddersfield Town	1969–70	Second Division	31	9	1	0	1	0	33	9
Huddersfield Town	1970–71	First Division	9	1	1	0	2	0	12	1
Huddersfield Town	1971–72	First Division	0	0	0	0	1	0	1	0
Huddersfield Town	Total		155	50	6	0	14	2	175	52
Brighton & Hove Albion (loan)	1971–72	Third Division	4	0	0	0	0	0	4	0
Bristol Rovers	1972–73	Third Division	9	1	0	0	0	0	9	1
Bristol Rovers	1973–74	Third Division	39	1	3	1	3	0	45	1
Bristol Rovers	1974–75	Second Division	6	2	0	0	0	0	6	2
Bristol Rovers	1975–76	Second Division	8	0	0	0	1	0	9	0
Bristol Rovers	Total		62	4	3	1	4	0	69	5
Career total			398	103	20	2	23	4	441	109

== Honours ==
Huddersfield Town

- Football League Second Division: 1969–70

Bristol Rovers

- Football League Third Division second-place promotion: 1973–74
