= 1974 Football League Cup final =

- Event: 1973–74 Football League Cup
| Manchester City | Wolverhampton Wanderers |
| 1 | 2 |
- Date: 2 March 1974
- Venue: Wembley Stadium, London
- Referee: Dave Wallace (Crewe)
- Attendance: 97,886

The 1974 Football League Cup final was the final match of the 1973–74 Football League Cup, the 14th season of the Football League Cup, a football competition for the 92 teams in The Football League. The match was played at Wembley Stadium on 2 March 1974, and was contested by two First Division clubs, Manchester City and Wolverhampton Wanderers.

Wolves won the match 2–1 with goals from Kenny Hibbitt and John Richards. Colin Bell had equalised for Manchester City. This gave the Midlanders their first major silverware since lifting the 1960 FA Cup.

== Match details ==
2 March 1974
15:30 GMT

| Manchester City | 1–2 | Wolverhampton Wanderers |
|---|---|---|
| Bell 59' | | Hibbitt 44'; Richards 85' |

Wembley Stadium, London
Attendance: 97,886
Referee: Dave Wallace (Crewe)

| Manchester City | Wolverhampton Wanderers |

| 1 | (Scotland) Keith MacRae |
| 2 | (England) Glyn Pardoe |
| 3 | (Scotland) Willie Donachie |
| 4 | (England) Mike Doyle |
| 5 | (England) Tommy Booth |
| 6 | (England) Tony Towers |
| 7 | (England) Mike Summerbee (c) |
| 8 | (England) Colin Bell |
| 9 | (England) Francis Lee |
| 10 | (Scotland) Denis Law |
| 11 | (England) Rodney Marsh |
Substitute:
| 12 | (England) Frank Carrodus |
Manager:
(England) Ron Saunders

| 1 | (England) Gary Pierce |
| 2 | (England) Geoff Palmer |
| 3 | (England) Derek Parkin |
| 4 | (England) Mike Bailey (c) |
| 5 | (Scotland) Frank Munro |
| 6 | (England) John McAlle |
| 7 | (England) Kenny Hibbitt |
| 8 | (England) Alan Sunderland |
| 9 | (England) John Richards |
| 10 | (Northern Ireland) Derek Dougan |
| 11 | (England) Dave Wagstaffe | (substituted off) 83' |
Substitute:
| 12 | (England) Barry Powell | (substituted on) 83' |
Manager:
(England) Bill McGarry

Match officials

- Assistant referees:
  - H. Williams (Sheffield)
  - R.G. Sheppard (Dunstable)

Match rules

- 90 minutes only
- Replay (at Stoke City) if scores still level
- One named substitute
- Maximum of 1 substitution

== Road to Wembley ==
=== Manchester City ===
| Round 2 | Walsall | 0–0 | Manchester City |
| Round 2 (Replay) | Manchester City | 0–0 | Walsall (a.e.t.) |
| Round 2 (2nd replay) | Walsall | 0–4 | Manchester City |
| Round 3 | Carlisle United | 0–1 | Manchester City |
| Round 4 | York City | 0–0 | Manchester City |
| Round 4 (Replay) | Manchester City | 4–1 | York City |
| Round 5 | Coventry City | 2–2 | Manchester City |
| Round 5 (Replay) | Manchester City | 4–2 | Coventry City |
| Semi-final (1st leg) | Plymouth Argyle | 1–1 | Manchester City |
| Semi-final (2nd leg) | Manchester City | 2–0 | Plymouth Argyle |
| Semi-final (2nd leg) | (Manchester City won 3–1 on aggregate) | | |

=== Wolverhampton Wanderers ===
| Round 2 | Halifax Town | 0–3 | Wolverhampton Wanderers |
| Round 3 | Tranmere Rovers | 1–1 | Wolverhampton Wanderers |
| Round 3 (Replay) | Wolverhampton Wanderers | 2–1 | Tranmere Rovers |
| Round 4 | Wolverhampton Wanderers | 5–1 | Exeter City |
| Round 5 | Wolverhampton Wanderers | 1–0 | Liverpool |
| Semi-final (1st leg) | Norwich City | 1–1 | Wolverhampton Wanderers |
| Semi-final (2nd leg) | Wolverhampton Wanderers | 1–0 | Norwich City |
| Semi-final (2nd leg) | (Wolverhampton Wanderers won 2–1 on aggregate) | | |
