= 1940–41 Huddersfield Town A.F.C. season =

Huddersfield Town
1940–41 season
- Chairman: Sir Amos Brook Hirst
- Manager: Clem Stephenson
- Stadium: Leeds Road
- Wartime League North: 11th
- League War Cup: First round (eliminated by Middlesbrough)
- Top goalscorer: League: All: Billy Price (16)
- Highest home attendance: 3,668 vs Leeds United (5 October 1940)
- Lowest home attendance: 386 vs Rochdale (22 March 1941)
- Biggest win: 11–0 vs Rochdale (22 March 1941)
- Biggest defeat: 0–4 vs Halifax Town (8 March 1941)
Home colours

Huddersfield Town's 1940–41 campaign saw Town play their first full season in the Wartime League. They finished 11th in the North Regional League, based on a goal average system.

== Results ==
=== North Regional League ===
Date	Opponents	Home/ Away	Result F–A	Scorers	Attendance
31 August 1940	Sheffield Wednesday	A	0–1		2,000
7 September 1940	Bradford (Park Avenue)	H	1–1	Isaac	1,971
14 September 1940	Leeds United	A	2–5	Price, Hayes (pen)	3,000
21 September 1940	Sheffield Wednesday	H	5–0	Neal, Barclay, Boot, Mountford, Metcalfe	2,214
28 September 1940	Halifax Town	A	1–1	Neal	5,000
5 October 1940	Leeds United	H	1–1	Metcalfe	3,668
12 October 1940	Manchester City	A	1–3	Price	4,000
19 October 1940	Barnsley	H	1–2	Neal	2,198
26 October 1940	Doncaster Rovers	A	1–1	Lodge	2,500
2 November 1940	Sheffield United	H	3–0	Price, Isaac, Lodge	870
9 November 1940	Rotherham United	A	0–1		2,000
16 November 1940	Chesterfield	H	2–2	Isaac, Hayes (pen)	2,017
23 November 1940	Barnsley	A	1–4	Price	2,500
30 November 1940	Doncaster Rovers	H	1–2	Price	1,422
7 December 1940	Sheffield United	A	3–1	Willingham, Lodge, Price	2,447
14 December 1940	Halifax Town	H	1–1	Isaac	637
21 December 1940	Bradford (Park Avenue)	A	2–3	Isaac, Mountford	1,349
25 December 1940	Bradford City	A	5–0	Metcalfe, Boot, Isaac, Price (2)	1,726
25 December 1940	Bradford City	H	3–4	Price, Barclay, Brook	1,774
28 December 1940	Manchester City	H	2–0	Barclay, Price	2,689
4 January 1941	Halifax Town	H	2–1	Lodge, Metcalfe	3,000
11 January 1941	Halifax Town	H	1–2	McKellor	2,088
18 January 1941	Halifax Town	A	4–1 (aet: 90 mins: 1–1)	McKellor, Price, Metcalfe (2)	1,856
8 March 1941	Halifax Town	A	0–4		1,000
22 March 1941	Rochdale	H	11–0	Metcalfe (2), Price (3), Lodge (2), McKerrell (3), Barclay	386
29 March 1941	Oldham Athletic	A	1–3	Lodge	2,490
5 April 1941	Oldham Athletic	H	1–0	McKerrell	584
12 April 1941	Barnsley	A	3–4	Wilkinson, Lodge, Brown	3,000
14 April 1941	Rotherham United	A	1–3	Hayes	2,500
19 April 1941	Bury	A	7–3	D. Jones (og), Price (2), McKerrell, Metcalfe, Henry, Barclay	1,500
26 April 1941	Burnley	H	0–3		1,001
10 May 1941	Leeds United	A	0–1		4,000
17 May 1941	Bury	H	2–0	Butt, Barclay	1,500

=== League War Cup ===
Date	Round	Opponents	Home/ Away	Result F – A	Scorers	Attendance
15 February 1941	Round 1 1st Leg	Middlesbrough	H	2–2	Barclay, Hayes (pen)	3,278
1 March 1941	Round 1 2nd Leg	Middlesbrough	A	2–4	Metcalfe, Price	5,221: Huddersfield lost 6–4 on aggregate.
