= 1939–40 Huddersfield Town A.F.C. season =

Huddersfield Town
1939-40 season
- Chairman: Sir Amos Brook Hirst
- Manager: Clem Stephenson
- Stadium: Leeds Road
- Football League First Division Wartime League North-East: 17th 1st
- League War Cup: Third round (eliminated by West Ham United)
- Top goalscorer: League: Billy Price (1); All: Bobby Barclay (11)
- Highest home attendance: 15,588 vs Blackpool (26 August 1939)
- Lowest home attendance: 332 vs Darlington (3 June 1940)
- Biggest win: 8–2 vs Darlington (25 May 1940)
- Biggest defeat: 1–3 vs West Ham United (22 May 1940)

Huddersfield Town's 1939-40 campaign saw Town play in Division 1, before the season was abandoned following the outbreak of World War II. They then played in the North-East League and won the title by 9 points from Newcastle United.

== Squad who played in the league matches ==
Note: Flags indicate national team as defined under FIFA eligibility rules; some limited exceptions apply. Players may hold more than one non-FIFA nationality.

Pos.	Nation	Player
GK	ENG	Bob Hesford
DF	ENG	Eddie Boot
DF	EIR	Bill Hayes
DF	ENG	Reg Mountford
DF	ENG	Ken Willingham
DF	ENG	Alf Young

Pos.	Nation	Player
MF	ENG	Jack Mahon
FW	ENG	Bobby Barclay
FW	ENG	Pat Beasley
FW	ENG	Jimmy Isaac
FW	SCO	Willie Mills
FW	ENG	Billy Price

== Results ==
=== Division One ===
Date	Opponents	Home/ Away	Result F - A	Scorers	Attendance
26 August 1939	Blackpool	H	0 - 1		15,588
30 August 1939	Sunderland	A	2 - 1	Gorman (og), Price	12,000
2 September 1939	Brentford	A	0 - 1		13,000

=== North-East Division ===
Date	Opponents	Home/ Away	Result F - A	Scorers	Attendance
21 October 1939	Bradford (Park Avenue)	H	4 - 1	Carter (3), Watson	3,862
28 October 1939	Middlesbrough	A	2 - 2	Barclay (2)	5,000
11 November 1939	Newcastle United	H	2 - 0	Isaac, Beasley	4,931
18 November 1939	Hull City	A	5 - 1	Barclay (3), C. Woodhead (og), Watson	5,000
25 November 1939	Halifax Town	H	1 - 2	Watson	1,856
2 December 1939	Leeds United	A	0 - 0		5,100
9 December 1939	Bradford City	H	1 - 1	Barclay	2,408
23 December 1939	Darlington	A	4 - 0	Boot, Brook, Beasley (2)	3,829
24 February 1940	Middlesbrough	H	4 - 2	Watson, Price (2), Beasley	2,835
9 March 1940	Newcastle United	A	5 - 3	Carter (3), Beasley (2)	6,000
16 March 1940	Hull City	H	1 - 0	Watson	2,961
23 March 1940	Halifax Town	A	3 - 2	Price, Isaac, Barclay	4,250
25 March 1940	Hartlepools United	H	4 - 1	Price (2), Boot, Isaac (pen)	4,326
30 March 1940	Leeds United	H	2 - 1	Smith, Beasley	5,833
6 April 1940	Bradford City	A	1 - 0	Price	6,036
13 April 1940	Bradford (Park Avenue)	A	2 - 1	Juliussen, Barclay	4,156
25 May 1940	Darlington	H	8 - 2	Brook (4), Isaac (2), Juliussen (2)	957
29 May 1940	York City	A	2 - 1^{[A]}	Barclay (2)	3,000
1 June 1940	Hartlepools United	A	2 - 2	Whittingham, Smailes	750
3 June 1940	York City	H	1 - 0	Barclay	332

=== League War Cup ===
Date	Round	Opponents	Home/ Away	Result F - A	Scorers	Attendance
20 April 1940	Round 1 1st Leg	Chesterfield	A	1 - 2	Barclay	9,200
27 April 1940	Round 1 2nd Leg	Chesterfield	H	2 - 0	Barclay, Barkas	7,276: Huddersfield won 3–2 on aggregate.
4 May 1940	Round 2 1st Leg	Hull City	H	1 - 1	Brook	5,752
11 May 1940	Round 2 2nd Leg	Hull City	A	1 - 0	Juliussen	6,500: Huddersfield won 2–1 on aggregate.
18 May 1940	Round 3	West Ham United	H	3 - 3	Isaac, Baird, Mountford (pen)	7,550
22 May 1940	Round 3 replay	West Ham United	A	1 - 3	Hagan	21,000

== Footnotes ==
A. Match abandoned after 61 minutes due to a storm, but the result was allowed to stand.
