= Alan McNeill =

Northern Irish footballer

Personal information
- Full name: Alan Alexander McNeill
- Date of birth: 16 August 1945 (age 81)
- Place of birth: Belfast, Northern Ireland
- Position: Midfielder

Youth career
- 1960–1962: Crusaders

Senior career*
Years	Team	Apps	(Gls)
1962–1967	Crusaders	?	(14)
1967	Detroit Cougars (guest)	2	(0)
1967–1968	Middlesbrough	3	(0)
1968–1969	Huddersfield Town	2	(0)
1969–1975	Oldham Athletic	170	(19)
1975–1977	Stockport County	71	(1)
1977–1981	Witton Albion	?	(?)
1981–1982	Macclesfield Town	4	(0)

International career
1963–1966	Northern Ireland Amateur	7	(1)
1968	Northern Ireland U23	1	(0)
- * Club domestic league appearances and goals

Alan Alexander McNeill (born 16 August 1945) is a former professional footballer, who played for Crusaders, Middlesbrough, Huddersfield Town, Oldham Athletic, Stockport County, Witton Albion and Macclesfield Town.

== Club career ==
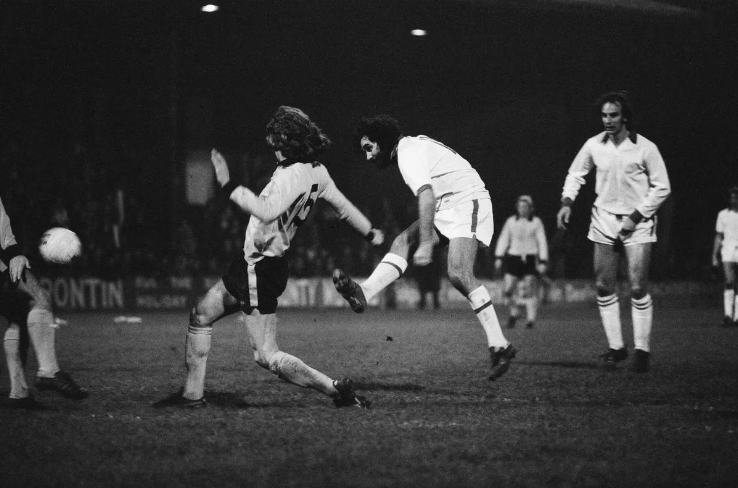
Alan McNeil & George Best

McNeill attended Belfast High School and signed with Crusaders as a 15-year-old. He made an early impact with the Crues, helping them to some of their earliest trophy successes and played seven times in Amateur internationals. In October 1963 he scored the only goal against Glenavon in the Ulster Cup final replay. In 1967 he was amongst the scorers as the Crues handed out a surprise defeat to Glentoran in the Irish Cup Final. That summer he joined up with the Glens squad that travelled as the Detroit Cougars to compete in the USA Eastern Division.

In 1967 McNeill, who had previously been watched by Newcastle United and Leeds United, transferred to Middlesbrough shortly after returning from the US. He had to wait until mid-way through the 1967/68 season to make his Second Division debut, in a 1-0 win at Aston Villa. Despite his versatility - he could play either as a forward or as a defensive midfielder - McNeill played just four times for Boro. He did earn inclusion in the Northern Ireland Under-23 squad, coming off the bench in a 1-0 win over Wales at Swansea.

Early in the 1968/69 season McNeill was allowed to join Huddersfield Town, but it was not until he joined Oldham Athletic in October 1969 that he made a significant impact on League football. By then a strongly built and hard-working attacking midfielder, he made an immediate impact at Boundary Park. He helped the team turn around a nine-game run without a win and in 1970/71 aided the Latics to promotion from the Fourth Division.

Injuries limited McNeill to just thirteen starts and five appearances from the bench during Oldham's 1973/74 Division Three championship campaign. He left Boundary Park in 1975 for Stockport County before drifting into non-league football two seasons later. He continued to pull on his boots in the Huddersfield League until the age of 46.
