= Gary Pierce (footballer) =

English footballer and manager (1951–2025)

Personal information
- Date of birth: 2 March 1951
- Place of birth: Bury, Lancashire, England
- Date of death: 24 May 2025 (aged 74)
- Place of death: Bury, Greater Manchester, England
- Height: 6 ft 2 1/2 in (1.89 m)
- Position: Goalkeeper

Youth career
- Bury
- Bolton Wanderers

Senior career*
Years	Team	Apps	(Gls)
- Mossley
1971–1973	Huddersfield Town	23	(0)
1973–1979	Wolverhampton Wanderers	98	(0)
1979–1983	Barnsley	81	(0)
1983–1984	Blackpool	27	(0)
- Accrington Stanley
- Rossendale United
- Chorley
Total		229	(0)

Managerial career
- 1988–1989: Accrington Stanley
- Netherfield
- * Club domestic league appearances and goals

Gary Pierce (2 March 1951 – 24 May 2025) was an English professional football goalkeeper.

Pierce began his football career in 1970 at non-league Mossley, before being quickly snapped up by First Division Huddersfield Town for £2,250, where he featured for two seasons. In 1973, he joined top flight Wolverhampton Wanderers for £45,000. Here, he was largely second choice to Phil Parkes, but after Parkes suffered injury, he played in the 1974 League Cup Final. Pierce made a series of outstanding saves in the game, helping Wolves defeat Manchester City 2–1 at Wembley.

Pierce was an ever-present in the 1976–77 season as Wolves won the Second Division at the first attempt, but the club bought Paul Bradshaw upon their return, relegating Pierce to reserve status again. He left Molineux in 1979 for Third Division Barnsley, where he played three seasons, before ending his league career with a season at Blackpool.

At Blackpool, he made 27 consecutive League appearances during the 1983–84 campaign as Sam Ellis' fourth goalkeeping change in seventeen matches. He took over from the on-loan Barry Siddall on 26 November 1983, as the Seasiders won 2–1 at Hereford United. His final game for the club occurred on 5 May 1984, a 3–2 defeat at Aldershot. Drew Brand became Blackpool's fifth goalkeeper used that season when he took over for the three remaining League games. His contract was cancelled later that month and his professional career was over at the age of 33.

Pierce then returned to non-league football with Accrington Stanley, Rossendale United and Chorley. In 1986, he returned to his original club Mossley and played through the 1986–87 season before retiring from playing completely.

After retiring as a player, he later had a spell as manager of Netherfield.

Pierce died after a short illness in Bury, on 24 May 2025, at the age of 74.

== Honours ==
Wolverhampton Wanderers

- Football League Cup: 1973–74
