= Brian Mahoney (footballer) =

English footballer

Personal information
- Date of birth: 12 May 1952 (age 74)
- Place of birth: Tantobie, England
- Position: Striker

Senior career*
Years	Team	Apps	(Gls)
1970–1972	Huddersfield Town	20	(2)
1972–1975	Barnsley	90	(16)
- * Club domestic league appearances and goals

Brian Mahoney (born 12 May 1952) is an English former professional footballer who played for Huddersfield Town and Barnsley. He was quite a stout gentleman, somewhat in the mold of Franny Lee.
