= Derek Parkin =

English footballer (born 1948)

Personal information
- Full name: Derek Parkin
- Date of birth: 2 January 1948 (age 78)
- Place of birth: Newcastle upon Tyne, England
- Height: 5 ft 10 in (1.78 m)
- Position: Full-back

Senior career*
Years	Team	Apps	(Gls)
1964–1968	Huddersfield Town	61	(1)
1968–1982	Wolverhampton Wanderers	501	(6)
1982–1983	Stoke City	40	(0)
Total		602	(7)

International career
1969–1971	England U23	5	(0)
- * Club domestic league appearances and goals

Derek Parkin (born 2 January 1948) is an English former football player who made a record number of appearances for Wolverhampton Wanderers (609). He also played for Huddersfield Town and Stoke City as well as the England under-23 national side

== Career ==
Parkin made his Football League debut on 7 November 1964 for Huddersfield Town against Bury, aged 16. In February 1968, he became at the time the most expensive full-back in Britain when he joined First Division side Wolves for £80,000. He made his club debut on 24 February 1968 against his hometown side Newcastle United.

Over 14 years at Molineux, Parkin made a record number of senior appearances – 609, including 501 league games, also a club record. He played 50 or more competitive matches in a season for Wolves no fewer than five times – another record – and in seasons 1968–69 and 1969–70, he took part in every single league and cup match played by the club. His long service saw him receive a testimonial match in 1979 and become one of the initial inductees into the club's Hall of Fame. He appeared in two Wembley Cup finals, collecting a winner's medal each time as Wolves won the League Cup in both 1974 and 1980, and also earned a Second Division championship medal in 1976–77.

Parkin ended his 15-season spell at Wolves by joining Stoke City on a free transfer in March 1982. He played ten matches for Stoke in 1981–82 and the played in 35 matches in 1982–83 before retiring from playing football. After his footballing career ended in May 1983, he moved into landscape gardening. He has also been involved in charity work in Wolverhampton.

== International career ==
The full-back made five appearances for the England U23 side between 1969 and 1971. He was called up to the full team in 1971 for a European Championship qualifier in Malta, but did not appear in the match.

== Career statistics ==
Appearances and goals by club, season and competition
Club	Season	League			FA Cup		League Cup		Other^{[A]}		Total	
Club	Season	Division	Apps	Goals	Apps	Goals	Apps	Goals	Apps	Goals	Apps	Goals
Huddersfield Town	1964–65	Second Division	1	0	0	0	0	0	0	0	1	0
Huddersfield Town	1965–66	Second Division	33	1	1	0	0	0	0	0	34	1
Huddersfield Town	1966–67	Second Division	27	0	1	0	7	0	0	0	35	0
Huddersfield Town	Total		61	1	2	0	7	0	0	0	70	1
Wolverhampton Wanderers	1967–68	First Division	15	1	0	0	0	0	0	0	15	1
Wolverhampton Wanderers	1968–69	First Division	42	0	2	0	3	0	0	0	47	0
Wolverhampton Wanderers	1969–70	First Division	42	1	1	0	3	0	4	0	50	1
Wolverhampton Wanderers	1970–71	First Division	39	0	2	0	1	0	7	1	49	1
Wolverhampton Wanderers	1971–72	First Division	32	2	2	0	1	1	7	0	42	3
Wolverhampton Wanderers	1972–73	First Division	18	0	4	0	0	0	1	0	23	0
Wolverhampton Wanderers	1973–74	First Division	39	0	2	0	6	0	4	0	51	0
Wolverhampton Wanderers	1974–75	First Division	41	2	1	0	1	0	2	0	45	2
Wolverhampton Wanderers	1975–76	First Division	30	0	6	0	3	0	0	0	39	0
Wolverhampton Wanderers	1976–77	Second Division	42	0	5	0	1	1	0	0	48	0
Wolverhampton Wanderers	1977–78	First Division	38	0	3	0	1	0	0	0	42	0
Wolverhampton Wanderers	1978–79	First Division	42	0	7	0	1	0	0	0	50	0
Wolverhampton Wanderers	1979–80	First Division	40	0	3	0	11	0	0	0	54	0
Wolverhampton Wanderers	1980–81	First Division	20	0	7	1	1	0	2	0	30	1
Wolverhampton Wanderers	1981–82	First Division	21	0	1	0	2	0	0	0	24	0
Wolverhampton Wanderers	Total		501	6	46	1	35	2	27	1	609	10
Stoke City	1981–82	First Division	10	0	0	0	0	0	0	0	10	0
Stoke City	1982–83	First Division	30	0	3	0	2	0	0	0	35	0
Stoke City	Total		40	0	3	0	2	0	0	0	45	0
Career total			602	7	51	1	44	2	27	1	724	11

A. The "Other" column constitutes appearances and goals in the Anglo-Italian Cup, Texaco Cup, UEFA Cup and Watney Cup.

== Honours ==
Wolverhampton Wanderers

- Football League Second Division: 1976–77
- Football League Cup: 1973–74, 1979–80
- Texaco Cup: 1970–71
