= Mike Barry (footballer) =

English footballer

Personal information
- Full name: Michael James Barry
- Date of birth: 22 May 1953 (age 73)
- Place of birth: Hull, England
- Position: Midfielder

Senior career*
| Years | Team | Apps | (Gls) |
| 1970–1973 | Huddersfield Town | 26 | (0) |
| 1973–1977 | Carlisle United | 81 | (10) |
| 1975 | → Washington Diplomats (loan) | 22 | (6) |
| 1977–1979 | Bristol Rovers | 47 | (3) |
| 1979 | Columbus Magic | ? | (?) |
| 1979 | Pittsburgh Spirit (indoor) | 3 | (3) |
| 1979–1982 | Cleveland Force (indoor) | 68 | (33) |
| 1980–1981 | Cleveland Cobras | | |
| 1982 | New Jersey Rockets (indoor) | 24 | (4) |
| 1984–1985 | Columbus Capitals (indoor) | | |

International career
| 1975 | Wales U-23 | 1 | (0) |
- * Club domestic league appearances and goals

Michael James Barry (born 22 May 1953) is a former professional football midfielder. Barry was born in Hull, East Riding of Yorkshire, England.

Barry played for Huddersfield Town, Carlisle United and Bristol Rovers in England before moving to the United States to play for the Columbus Magic of the American Soccer League. In 1975, he played on loan from Carlisle United to the Washington Diplomats of the North American Soccer League. Barry began the 1979–80 Major Indoor Soccer League with the Pittsburgh Spirit, but moved to the Cleveland Force after three games. He remained with the Force through the 1980–81 season and the beginning of the 1981–82 season. The Force sent Barry to the New Jersey Rockets midway through the season. Even with his move indoors, Barry continued to play outdoor soccer. In 1979, he joined the Columbus Magic of the second division American Soccer League. In 1980 and 1981, he played for the Cleveland Cobras, also of the ASL. Barry finished his career with the Columbus Capitals of the minor league American Indoor Soccer Association.
