= David Shaw (footballer, born 1948) =

English footballer

Personal information
- Full name: George David Shaw
- Date of birth: 11 October 1948 (age 78)
- Place of birth: Huddersfield, England
- Height: 5 ft 10 in (1.78 m)
- Position: Striker

Senior career*
Years	Team	Apps	(Gls)
1966–1969	Huddersfield Town	26	(2)
1969–1973	Oldham Athletic	155	(70)
1973–1975	West Bromwich Albion	82	(17)
1975–1978	Oldham Athletic	59	(21)
Total		322	(110)
- * Club domestic league appearances and goals

George David Shaw (born 11 October 1948) is a former professional footballer, who played for Huddersfield Town, Oldham Athletic and West Bromwich Albion. He was the grandson of David Steele, triple championship winner and later manager of Huddersfield Town, so it was hardly surprising that David Shaw should begin his career with his home town club.

However, after just 24 games and 3 goals, in September 1969 he was part of an exchange deal in which Les Chapman moved to Leeds Road from Oldham Athletic and Shaw moved across the Pennines to join the Lancashire club. His speed off the mark and eye for a goal soon made him a favourite with the Boundary Park faithful, and his partnership with Jim Fryatt in the 1970–71 season, when he scored 23 goals and Fryatt scored 24, made a major contribution to the Oldham club's promotion from Division 4.

His continued success over the next two seasons led to what was then a big-money transfer in March 1973, when he moved to West Bromwich Albion for a fee of £80,000. Playing at a higher level, he was not to achieve quite the same success as he had in the lower divisions, scoring 17 league goals in 65 starts for the Midlands club. He was already starting to suffer from niggling injuries towards the end of his time there, and in October 1975 he moved back to Oldham on a free transfer.

He maintained a more than reasonable strike rate on his return to the club, netting 21 goals in his 59 appearances over the next three years, but he was troubled by a knee injury for much of this time and was forced to retire in 1978.

== Bibliography ==
- Dykes, Garth (1988). Oldham Athletic: Complete Record 1899–1988. Breedon Books. ISBN 978-0-907969-36-5.
- Dykes, Garth (2002). Latics Lads – Oldham Athletic 1907–2002. Yore Publications.
- Thomas, Ian; Thomas, Owen; Hodgson, Alan; Ward, John (2007). 99 Years and Counting: Stats and Stories. Huddersfield Town A.F.C. ISBN 978-0955728105.
