= Alan Jones (footballer, born 1951) =

English footballer

Personal information
- Date of birth: 21 January 1951 (age 75)
- Place of birth: Grimethorpe, West Riding of Yorkshire, England
- Position: Midfielder

Senior career*
Years	Team	Apps	(Gls)
1970–1973	Huddersfield Town	32	(0)
1973–1976	Halifax Town	109	(6)
1976–1978	Chesterfield	39	(5)
1978–1979	Lincoln City	26	(4)
1979	Columbus Magic	?	(?)
1979–1980	Bradford City	19	(1)
1980–1981	Rochdale	44	(5)
- * Club domestic league appearances and goals

Alan Jones (born 21 January 1951) is an English former professional footballer, who played for Huddersfield Town, Halifax Town, Chesterfield, Lincoln City, Bradford City, Rochdale and also in the US for the Columbus Magic. He was born in Grimethorpe, South Yorkshire.
