= Billy Legg =

English footballer (1948–2022)

Personal information
- Full name: William Campbell Legg
- Date of birth: 17 April 1948
- Place of birth: Bradford, England
- Date of death: 8 August 2022 (aged 74)
- Position: Left back

Senior career*
| Years | Team | Apps | (Gls) |
| 1965–1969 | Huddersfield Town | 56 | (4) |
- Bradford Park Avenue
- * Club domestic league appearances and goals

William Campbell Legg (17 April 1948 – 8 August 2022) was an English professional footballer, who played for Huddersfield Town and Bradford Park Avenue.

Legg died on 8 August 2022, at the age of 74.

== Sources ==
- Ian Thomas, Owen Thomas, Alan Hodgson, John Ward (2007). 99 Years and Counting: Stats and Stories. Huddersfield Town A.F.C. ISBN 978-0955728105.
