= Dick Krzywicki =

Welsh footballer

Personal information
- Full name: Ryszard Lech Krzywicki
- Date of birth: 2 February 1947 (age 79)
- Place of birth: Penley, Flintshire, Wales
- Height: 5 ft 10 in (1.78 m)
- Position: Midfielder

Youth career
- Leek CSOB

Senior career*
| Years | Team | Apps | (Gls) |
| 1965–1970 | West Bromwich Albion | 57 | (9) |
| 1970–1974 | Huddersfield Town | 47 | (7) |
| 1973 | → Scunthorpe United (loan) | 2 | (0) |
| 1973 | → Northampton Town (loan) | 8 | (3) |
| 1974–1976 | Lincoln City | 68 | (11) |
| Total | | 182 | (30) |

International career
| 1969–1971 | Wales | 8 | (1) |
- * Club domestic league appearances and goals

Ryszard Lech Krzywicki (born 2 February 1947) is a Welsh former professional footballer and Wales international.

== Early and personal life ==
He was born to Polish parents; his father was a Polish Army veteran who had survived Auschwitz.

== Club career ==
During his career he played for Leek CSOB, West Bromwich Albion, Huddersfield Town, Scunthorpe United, Northampton Town and Lincoln City.

He was the first West Bromwich Albion substitute to enter the field in a League Cup match when he replaced Doug Fraser against Manchester City in October 1966. He went on to score a goal as Albion progressed by a 4–2 scoreline. Krzywicki became the first Albion player to be substituted in an FA Cup game when he made way for Graham Lovett against Colchester United in January 1968.

== International career ==
Krzywicki made his senior debut for Wales on 22 October 1969 in a 3–1 defeat to East Germany. His finest moment gaining his 8 caps for Wales was when he scored against the then world champions, England in the 1970 British Home Championship. He made his final appearance on 27 October 1971 in a 1–0 defeat to Czechoslovakia.

He also earned 8 caps at under-23 level.

== Personal life ==
Krzywicki's daughter Tara played for Wales at international level, winning six caps, before becoming a long-distance runner. His son Nick is a professional golfer.

== Honours ==
West Bromwich Albion

- Football League Cup runner-up: 1969–70
