= Brian Hill (footballer, born 1942) =

English footballer

Personal information
- Date of birth: 15 December 1942 (age 83)
- Place of birth: Mansfield, England
- Position: Winger

Senior career*
Years	Team	Apps	(Gls)
- Ollerton Colliery
1960–1967	Grimsby Town	180	(26)
1967–1969	Huddersfield Town	88	(6)
1969–1971	Blackburn Rovers	37	(4)
1971–1972	Torquay United	7	(1)
1972–1973	Boston United	4	(0)
- * Club domestic league appearances and goals

Brian Hill (born 15 December 1942) is a former professional footballer born in Mansfield, who played as a winger for Grimsby Town, Huddersfield Town, Blackburn Rovers and Torquay United in the Football League, and in non-league football for Boston United.
