= Dennis Clarke =

English footballer

Personal information
- Date of birth: 18 January 1948 (age 78)
- Place of birth: Stockton-on-Tees, County Durham, England
- Position: Defender

Youth career
- 1963–1965: West Bromwich Albion

Senior career*
Years	Team	Apps	(Gls)
1965–1968	West Bromwich Albion	21	(0)
1968–1973	Huddersfield Town	172	(3)
1973–1975	Birmingham City	14	(0)
Total		207	(3)
- * Club domestic league appearances and goals

Dennis Clarke (born 18 January 1948) is an English former professional footballer who played as a defender for West Bromwich Albion, Huddersfield Town and Birmingham City in the Football League.

He has the distinction of being the first substitute to be used in an FA Cup Final, during the 1968 FA Cup Final for West Bromwich Albion against Everton, when he replaced the injured John Kaye.

== Honours ==
West Bromwich Albion

- Football League Second Division: 1970–71
- FA Cup: 1967–68
- Football League Cup runner-up: 1966–67
