= Les Chapman =

English footballer & manager (born 1948)

Personal information
- Full name: Leslie Chapman
- Date of birth: 27 September 1948 (age 78)
- Place of birth: Oldham, England
- Height: 5 ft 7 in (1.70 m)
- Position: Midfielder

Senior career*
Years	Team	Apps	(Gls)
1966–1969	Oldham Athletic	76	(9)
1969–1974	Huddersfield Town	134	(8)
1974–1978	Oldham Athletic	187	(11)
1978	San Jose Earthquakes	20	(0)
1979	Stockport County	32	(1)
1979–1982	Bradford City	139	(3)
1983–1984	Rochdale	88	(0)
1985	Stockport County	38	(3)
1986–1987	Preston North End	53	(1)
Total		767	(36)

Managerial career
- 1985–1986: Stockport County
- 1990–1992: Preston North End
- * Club domestic league appearances and goals

Leslie Chapman (born 27 September 1948), commonly known as Les and sometimes as Chappy, is an English former football player and manager. As a player, he made 747 appearances in the Football League in a career that spanned 22 seasons, playing for Oldham Athletic (two spells), Huddersfield Town, Stockport County (two spells), Bradford City, Rochdale and Preston North End, and also spent a season in the North American Soccer League with the San Jose Earthquakes. As a manager, he took charge of Stockport County and Preston North End. After his spell in club management he became a long-standing kit manager for Manchester City before moving to his current role as a presenter and content producer for the club's media department. He also had a brief cameo in the song "Parklife" by Blur.

== Playing career ==
=== Early years ===
Chapman was born in Oldham, Lancashire, growing up in nearby Royton, and as a youngster played for Chadderton Boys before going on to play for Huddersfield Town's youth team during his schooldays. He spent the first months of his working life as a trainee accountant with Middleton Council before being recommended to Oldham Athletic, where he signed as a professional. He made his first-team debut as an 18-year-old against Bristol Rovers in February 1967, but went back to Huddersfield Town in September 1969.

=== Back at Oldham ===
In December 1974, he returned to Oldham Athletic, now in Division Two. He stayed at the club for the next four and a half years, during which they climbed back up to the Second Division. Chapman missed only five games during that time and it came as a surprise to many when he left at the end of the 1978–79 season. In total, he made 263 league appearances for Oldham Athletic and scored 20 times.

=== Later years ===
Upon leaving Oldham, Chapman spent the summer of 1979 playing in the North American Soccer League for San Jose Earthquakes before returning to England and to Stockport County. After one season at Edgeley Park, Chapman left to sign for Bradford City. He spent four seasons at Valley Parade making 139 league appearances, before leaving on a free transfer for Rochdale where he spent two seasons, playing nearly 100 games for the Spotland side. His career at Preston saw him a regular in the team during their successful promotion season of 1986 to 1987. and he scored the winning goal in an away match at Leyton Orient that confirmed their promotion. For that reason he is still fondly remembered by PNE supporters. A fanzine "53 miles West of Venus" was published for several years afterwards following Chapman's immediate comments about how he felt after the game.

== Management career ==
In July 1985 he became player-manager of Stockport County but moved on a year later to become player-coach under John McGrath at Preston North End. In 1990, he took over the managership of the club himself but was later sacked in October 1992. He became reserve team coach at Manchester City in January 1993 but was replaced by Kevin Bond in July 1996. Then in 1996 he became youth coach at Huddersfield Town in place of Mark Lillis but was sacked in October 1997. He then became Manchester City's kit man, a position he held for 17 years before moving into semi-retirement with a job in the club's media department, capitalising on his popularity with the fans to help to produce video content.

== Personal life ==
Chapman's daughter, Tiffany, is an actress perhaps best known for playing Rachel Jordache in the British soap opera Brookside.
