= Frank Drabble =

English footballer

Personal information
- Full name: Frank Drabble
- Date of birth: 8 July 1888
- Place of birth: Southport, England
- Date of death: 29 July 1964 (aged 76)
- Place of death: Staines, England
- Height: 5 ft 10 1/2 in (1.79 m)
- Position: Goalkeeper

Youth career
- Bloxwich Wesleyans
- Southport YMCA

Senior career*
Years	Team	Apps	(Gls)
1909–1910	Tottenham Hotspur	1	(0)
1910–1911	Nottingham Forest	8	(0)
1912	Burnley	2	(0)
1913–1914	Bradford Park Avenue	32	(0)
1914–1916	Southport Central	7	(0)
1919–1921	Bolton Wanderers	29	(0)
1921–1924	Southport	5	(0)
1924	Queens Park Rangers	2	(0)
Total		86	(0)
- * Club domestic league appearances and goals

Frank Drabble (8 July 1888 – 29 July 1964) was a professional footballer who played for Bloxwich Wesley, Southport YMCA, Tottenham Hotspur, Nottingham Forest, Burnley, Bradford Park Avenue, Southport Central, Bolton Wanderers and Queens Park Rangers.

== Playing career ==
Drabble had spells with youth clubs Bloxwich Wesleyans and Southport YMCA before joining Tottenham Hotspur in 1909. The goalkeeper played one match in his time at the club. He played a further eight matches at Nottingham Forest in 1910. Drabble played two matches for Burnley in 1910 before featuring in 32 matches at Bradford Park Avenue. He had further spells at Southport Central (twice), Bolton Wanderers and finally Queens Park Rangers.

== Personal life ==
After his retirement from football, Drabble worked as an estate agent.
