= Ray Mielczarek =

Welsh footballer (1946–2013)

Personal information
- Full name: Raymond Mielczarek
- Date of birth: 10 February 1946
- Place of birth: Caernarfon, Wales
- Date of death: 30 October 2013 (aged 67)
- Place of death: Rhosddu, Wales
- Position: Defender

Senior career*
Years	Team	Apps	(Gls)
1964–1967	Wrexham	76	(0)
1967–1971	Huddersfield Town	26	(1)
1971–1974	Rotherham United	115	(7)

International career^{‡}
1971	Wales	1	(0)
- * Club domestic league appearances and goals as of 21 August 2007 ‡ National team caps and goals as of 21 August 2007

Raymond Mielczarek (10 February 1946 – 30 October 2013) was a Welsh professional footballer who gained 1 cap for Wales during his career. He was of both Polish and Luxembourgian descent.

== Club career ==
As a youngster, Mielczarek was persuaded to become an apprentice at Wrexham by club coach Ken Roberts and later captained Wales at youth level whilst playing in the team's reserve side. He made his professional league debut in 1964 against Aldershot before establishing himself in the first team. In September 1967, he left to join Huddersfield Town for a fee of around £20,000 but a snapped cruciate ligament injury sustained after playing just 25 games for the club eventually lead to him leaving to sign for Rotherham United in January 1971. After making over 100 appearances for Rotherham, he was forced to retire when he suffered a recurrence of his cruciate ligament injury.

== International career ==
Mielczarek won his only cap for Wales in a 1–0 win over Finland on 26 May 1971. He also later took part in a one-month tour of Asia and Oceania as part of a Wales XI.

== After football ==
After leaving football, Mielczarek worked in a number of professions, including as an ambulance driver, driving instructor, security officer and a cake salesman.

== Personal life ==
He was born in Caernarfon on 10 February 1946, and died on 30 October 2013 at the age of 67.
