= Geoff Hutt =

English footballer

Personal information
- Date of birth: 28 September 1949 (age 77)
- Place of birth: Hazelwood, Duffield, England
- Height: 5 ft 8 in (1.73 m)
- Position: Left back

Youth career
- –: Huddersfield Town

Senior career*
| Years | Team | Apps | (Gls) |
| 1968–1976 | Huddersfield Town | 245 | (4) |
| 1975 | → Blackburn Rovers (loan) | 10 | (1) |
| 1976–1977 | Haarlem | 2 | (0) |
| 1977–1978 | York City | 63 | (1) |
| 1978–1980 | Halifax Town | 76 | (0) |
- * Club domestic league appearances and goals

Geoffrey Hutt (born 28 September 1949) is an English former professional footballer born in Hazelwood, Duffield, Derbyshire, who played as a left back in the Football League for Huddersfield Town, Blackburn Rovers, York City and Halifax Town, and in the Eredivisie for Haarlem.
