= Terry Poole (footballer, born 1949) =

English footballer

Personal information
- Full name: Terence Poole
- Date of birth: 16 December 1949 (age 76)
- Place of birth: Chesterfield, England
- Height: 5 ft 10 1/2 in (1.79 m)
- Position: Goalkeeper

Senior career*
Years	Team	Apps	(Gls)
1967–1968	Manchester United	0	(0)
1968–1977	Huddersfield Town	207	(0)
1977–1981	Bolton Wanderers	29	(0)
1979	→ Sheffield United (loan)	7	(0)
Total		243	(0)
- * Club domestic league appearances and goals

Terence Poole (born 16 December 1949) is an English former professional footballer who played as a goalkeeper in the Football League for Huddersfield Town, Bolton Wanderers and Sheffield United. Born in Chesterfield, he started his career at Manchester United but never appeared for the first team.
