= Ian Greaves =

English footballer and manager

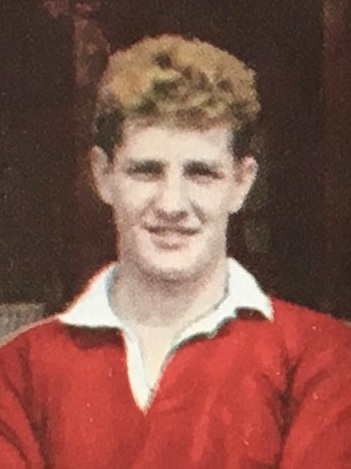

Personal information
- Full name: Ian Denzil Greaves
- Date of birth: 26 May 1932
- Place of birth: Crompton, Lancashire, England
- Date of death: 2 January 2009 (aged 76)
- Place of death: Ainsworth, Bury, Greater Manchester, England
- Position: Full-back

Senior career*
Years	Team	Apps	(Gls)
1953–1960	Manchester United	67	(0)
1960–1961	Lincoln City	11	(0)
1961–1963	Oldham Athletic	22	(0)
Total		100	(0)

Managerial career
- 1964: Huddersfield Town (caretaker)
- 1968–1974: Huddersfield Town
- 1974–1980: Bolton Wanderers
- 1980–1982: Oxford United
- 1982: Wolverhampton Wanderers
- 1983–1989: Mansfield Town
- * Club domestic league appearances and goals

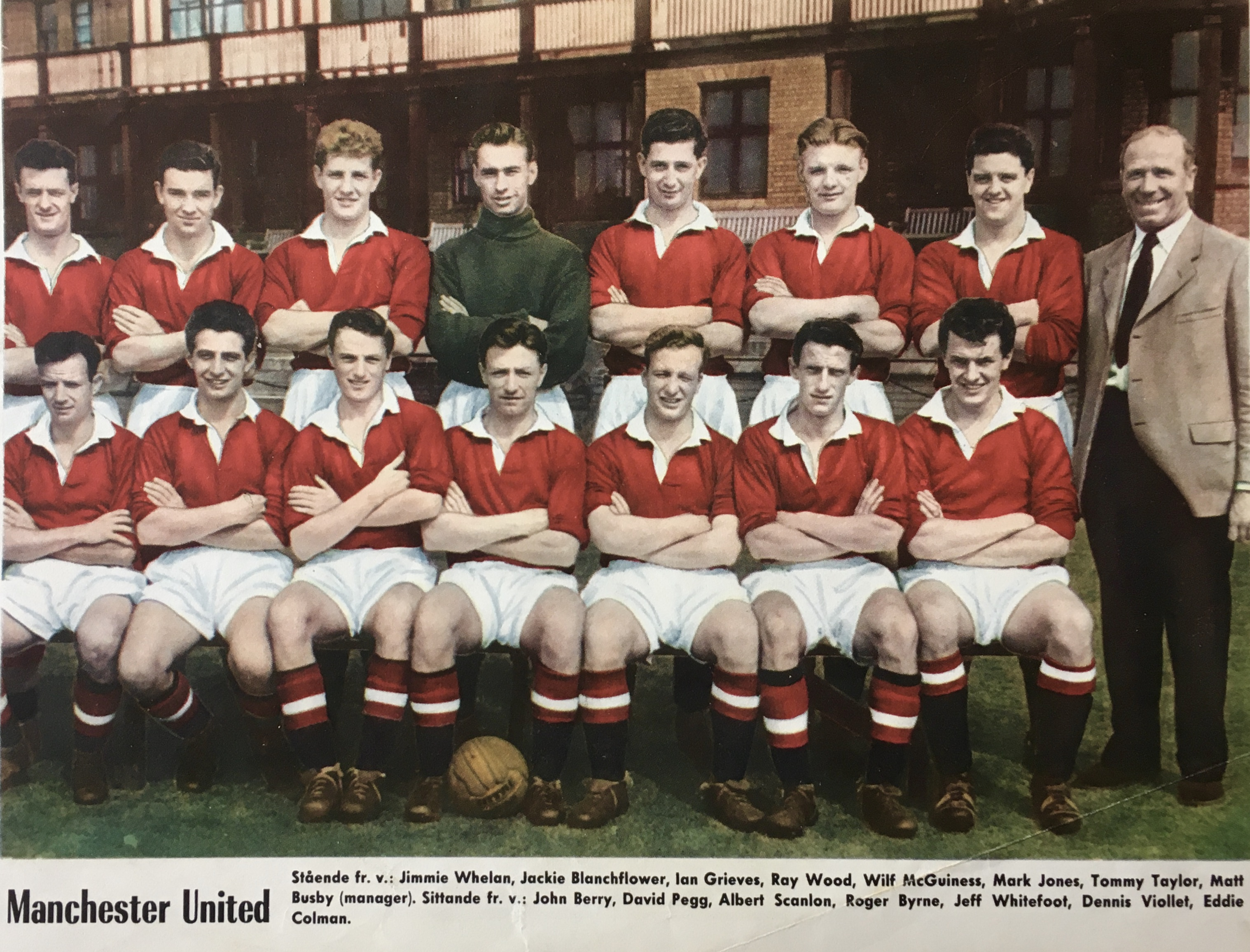
Greaves (back row, third from left) in a Manchester United team photo in 1957

Ian Denzil Greaves (26 May 1932 – 2 January 2009) was an English football player and manager. He was born in Crompton, Lancashire. He won a League Championship medal and an FA Cup runners-up medal while playing full-back for Manchester United between 1953 and 1960. He was not with the United team when eight of their players died in the Munich air disaster on 6 February 1958, as he was ruled out by injury. He was the first player to occupy the left-back position at United after the death of captain Roger Byrne at Munich.

After leaving United in 1960, he later played for Lincoln City and Oldham Athletic.

== Managerial career ==
He took over the reins at Huddersfield Town in 1968 and led them to the Football League Second Division championship in 1969–1970.

After leaving Huddersfield in the summer of 1974 he joined Bolton Wanderers as assistant to Jimmy Armfield and when Armfield took over the vacant manager's position at Leeds United he was promoted to the top job, taking over a squad that included Sam Allardyce and Peter Reid. In his time there he again won promotion to the top division and also reached the League Cup semi-final while the club were still in the second division. Unfortunately, Bolton's First Division performance was disappointing and Greaves was sacked on 28 January 1980.

An 18-month spell at Oxford United followed, before he took charge of First Division side Wolverhampton Wanderers in February 1982. However, the team were in the relegation zone at the time of his appointment and he was unable to prevent the drop, winning just five of his 20 games. Bankruptcy struck in the summer and saw a new regime eventually take control who opted to replace Greaves with Graham Hawkins.

Greaves' final managerial job was in the lower leagues at Mansfield Town where he spent six years, guiding the Stags to promotion in 1985–86, and winning the Associate Members' Cup at Wembley in 1987. They were still secure in the Third Division when he departed on 6 February 1989.

He died in Ainsworth, Greater Manchester, on 2 January 2009, aged 76.

== Managerial statistics ==
All competitive league games (league and domestic cup) and international matches (including friendlies) are included.

Team	Nat	Year	Record				
Team	Nat	Year	G	W	D	L	Win %
Huddersfield Town	(England)	1968–1974	281	89	88	104	31.67
Bolton Wanderers	(England)	1974–1980	256	100	73	83	39.06
Oxford United	(England)	1980–1982	60	26	16	18	43.33
Wolverhampton Wanderers	(England)	1982	21	5	6	10	23.81
Mansfield Town	(England)	1983–1989	311	101	99	111	32.48
Career total			929	321	282	326	34.55

== Honours ==
=== As a player ===
Manchester United

- FA Cup runner-up: 1957–58

=== As a manager ===
Mansfield Town

- Associate Members' Cup: 1986–87
