= Jimmy McGill (footballer, born 1946) =

Scottish footballer

Personal information
- Full name: James Morrison McGill
- Date of birth: 27 November 1946
- Place of birth: Partick, Scotland
- Date of death: 25 March 2015 (aged 68)
- Position: Midfielder

Senior career*
| Years | Team | Apps | (Gls) |
| 1965–1967 | Arsenal | 10 | (0) |
| 1967–1971 | Huddersfield Town | 164 | (8) |
| 1971–1975 | Hull City | 147 | (2) |
| 1975–1977 | Halifax Town | 32 | (0) |
| 1977–1978 | Frickley Athletic | | |
| Total | | 353 | (10) |
- * Club domestic league appearances and goals

James Morrison McGill (27 November 1946 – 25 March 2015) was a Scottish footballer, who played for a number of clubs during the 1960s and 1970s, including Arsenal, and Huddersfield Town.

Born in Partick, McGill started out at Possil Park before joining Arsenal in July 1965. He made his debut against Leeds United on 5 May 1966 (a match which coincidentally saw Arsenal's lowest-ever attendance at Highbury, of just 4,554) but could not break into the first team and left Arsenal in September 1967 with just 12 appearances to his name. He moved to Huddersfield Town, where he spent four seasons and won the Second Division title, and then another five seasons at Hull City where he was club captain. He then moved to Halifax Town and spent time on loan in the US and later played in Australia before returning to England where he finished his career at Frickley Athletic.

== Honours ==
Hull City

- Watney Cup runner-up: 1973
