= Jimmy Lawson (English footballer) =

English footballer (born 1947)

Personal information
- Full name: James Joseph Lawson
- Date of birth: 11 December 1947 (age 78)
- Place of birth: Middlesbrough, England
- Position: Winger

Youth career
- Middlesbrough

Senior career*
Years	Team	Apps	(Gls)
1965–1968	Middlesbrough	31	(3)
1968–1976	Huddersfield Town	245	(42)
1976–1979	Halifax Town	93	(9)
Total		369	(54)

Managerial career
- 1976–1978: Halifax Town (player-manager)
- * Club domestic league appearances and goals

James Joseph Lawson (born 11 December 1947) is an English former professional footballer who played as a winger in the Football League for Middlesbrough, Huddersfield Town and Halifax Town, where he later became player-manager.

== Personal life ==
Lawson was a personal tailor when he was at Huddersfield Town in the 1970s. He is now a salesman for STILL Materials Handling Ltd. His son Ian was also a professional footballer.
