= Trevor Cherry =

English footballer and manager (1948–2020)

Personal information
- Full name: Trevor John Cherry
- Date of birth: 23 February 1948
- Place of birth: Huddersfield, England
- Date of death: 29 April 2020 (aged 72)
- Height: 5 ft 9 in (1.75 m)
- Position: Defender

Youth career
- 1963–1965: Huddersfield Town

Senior career*
| Years | Team | Apps | (Gls) |
| 1965–1972 | Huddersfield Town | 156 | (11) |
| 1972–1982 | Leeds United | 399 | (24) |
| 1982–1985 | Bradford City | 92 | (0) |
| Total | | 679 | (36) |

International career
| 1977 | England U21 | 1 | (0) |
| 1976–1980 | England | 27 | (0) |

Managerial career
- 1982–1987: Bradford City
- * Club domestic league appearances and goals

Trevor John Cherry (23 February 1948 – 29 April 2020) was an English footballer who notably captained both England and Leeds United. A defender, Cherry also played for Huddersfield Town and Bradford City, and managed the latter club.

Born in Huddersfield, he started his career at his hometown team before he made his name at Leeds United during the 1970s, making 486 appearances and winning the Championship title in 1973–74. He won a total of 27 international caps and captained the England team on one occasion.

== Playing career ==
=== Huddersfield Town ===
Born in Huddersfield on 23 January 1948, Cherry joined his hometown club Huddersfield Town as part of the groundstaff in July 1963 as a 15-year-old from the Huddersfield YMCA, before signing a full-time professional contract in 1965. He made his debut in 1965, aged 17, establishing himself as a classy defender who could play anywhere across the back line, and helped Huddersfield win the Second Division title in the 1969–70 season. They were relegated after two seasons in the top flight and in 1972 Cherry left for local rivals Leeds United after making a total of 188 appearances; he had impressed Leeds manager Don Revie enough for him to consider him a potential replacement for Jack Charlton.

=== Leeds United ===
Cherry – along with teammate Roy Ellam – moved along the M62 in 1972 when Leeds paid £100,000 to Huddersfield for his services. He ended up playing both alongside and instead of Charlton in his first season but predominantly at left back, replacing broken leg victim Terry Cooper. By the end of the season Cherry had amassed 38 League appearances and was selected by Revie for the 1973 FA Cup final, which Leeds lost to Sunderland.

He did, however, win the League championship with Leeds in 1973–74, as the team went on a record 29-match unbeaten run at the start of the season to make sure the title would be theirs; Cherry spent much of the season at left back, playing 38 times in total. The following season, 1974–75, was a mixed year for Cherry. Injury curtailed half of his season, but he recovered in time to help Leeds in their European Cup campaign as they progressed towards the semi-finals and a game against Barcelona. Cherry marked Dutch legend Johan Cruyff out of each leg as Leeds reached the final, but after missing subsequent League matches through suspension, manager Jimmy Armfield placed him on the substitute's bench for the final against Bayern Munich, and he did not play.

In 1976, Cherry became Leeds captain after Billy Bremner left, and won his first England cap. He continued to play for Leeds until 1982, the year that the club were relegated to the Second Division, and won the club's Player of The Season award in 1981. In 2000, Cherry was voted the 30th best Leeds United player by its fans.

=== Bradford City and management ===
Cherry played three months of Second Division football for Leeds before leaving for another neighbouring club, Bradford City, where he became player-manager. He played for three years until he retired to concentrate on management. His final game in football was City's 2–0 win against Bolton Wanderers on 6 May 1985 which captured the Division Three title. Cherry also won the Third Division manager of the season award. However, Cherry's own personal success paled into insignificance when the Valley Parade ground was devastated by the Bradford City stadium fire during the final game of the season on 11 May 1985, killing 56 people. The subsequent appeal to raise money for the bereaved families and injured supporters raised more than four million pounds, and Cherry was among the mourners at many funerals.

He steered Bradford to 13th place the following season despite the club having to play home games at three other grounds; Odsal Stadium, Bradford and his former home grounds of Elland Road and Leeds Road. Cherry was manager when City returned to Valley Parade in December 1986 but was sacked the following month when the club was struggling – a surprise decision that provoked angry demonstrations against the board.

== International career ==
Cherry won his first English cap on 24 March 1976 against Wales. He became the first England player to be sent off in an international friendly, when he was sent off against Argentina in 1977. Cherry lost two teeth after being punched in the mouth by Daniel Bertoni, whom Cherry had felled with a nasty tackle from behind; Bertoni also received a red card.

England did not qualify for the 1978 World Cup, but did so for the 1980 European Championships, and Cherry was included in the squad of 22 to travel there. In a warm-up game just before the tournament, Cherry captained his country for the only time in a 2–1 win against Australia at the Sydney Cricket Ground. His tournament was limited, however, to a single substitute appearance against Spain. It was to be his 27th and final cap.

== Post-football ==
After he was sacked by Bradford City, Cherry gave up football in general for a number of years. He ran a promotions and hospitality company in Huddersfield, a waste paper company and a five-a-side football centre. In 2004, he also made a bid to buy into Leeds United. He was also given an honorary degree by the University of Huddersfield in November 2005.

Cherry died suddenly on 29 April 2020, aged 72 from COVID-19. He was survived by his wife Sue, with whom he had two sons and a daughter, and five grandchildren.

== Honours ==
Leeds United

- Football League First Division: 1973–74
- FA Cup runner-up: 1972–73

Bradford City

- Football League Third Division: 1984–85
