= Jimmy Nicholson (Northern Irish footballer) =

Northern Irish footballer (1943–2025)

Personal information
- Full name: James Joseph Nicholson
- Date of birth: 27 February 1943
- Place of birth: Belfast, Northern Ireland
- Date of death: 4 October 2025 (aged 82)
- Height: 5 ft 9 in (1.75 m)
- Position: Midfielder

Senior career*
| Years | Team | Apps | (Gls) |
| 1960–1963 | Manchester United | 58 | (5) |
| 1964–1973 | Huddersfield Town | 281 | (25) |
| 1973–1976 | Bury | 83 | (0) |
| 1976–1977 | Mossley | 31 | (1) |
| 1977–? | Stalybridge Celtic | | |

International career
| 1957–1959 | Northern Ireland Schoolboys | 3 | (0) |
| 1959–1961 | Northern Ireland B | 4 | (0) |
| 1962–1965 | Northern Ireland U23 | 2 | (0) |
| 1960–1971 | Northern Ireland | 41 | (6) |
- * Club domestic league appearances and goals

James Joseph Nicholson (27 February 1943 – 4 October 2025) was a Northern Irish footballer who played as a midfielder. He played most of his career at Huddersfield Town and earned 41 caps for the Northern Ireland national team.

== Club career ==
Nicholson began his career with Manchester United, for whom he made 58 appearances, scoring five times, between 1960 and 1963, when he moved over the Pennines to Huddersfield Town. He subsequently played for Bury, Mossley and Stalybridge Celtic.

== International career ==
Nicholson represented Northern Ireland at international level. He represented his country at each level earning three caps for the Schoolboys, as well as playing twice for Northern Ireland U23 and four caps for Northern Ireland B.

He also appeared for Northern Ireland at full international level, appearing 41 times for Northern Ireland, scoring six goals. Over an 11-year international career from 1960 to 1971 making him the most capped player internationally for Huddersfield Town.

== Death ==
Nicholson died on 4 October 2025, at the age of 82.

== Honours ==
Huddersfield Town

- Football League Second Division: 1969–70
