= Steve Smith (footballer, born 1946) =

English footballer and manager (1946–2024)

Personal information
- Full name: Stephen Smith
- Date of birth: 28 April 1946
- Place of birth: Huddersfield, West Riding of Yorkshire, England
- Date of death: 13 March 2024 (aged 77)
- Place of death: Bradford, West Yorkshire, England
- Positions: Left-back; midfielder

Youth career
- 1961–1963: Huddersfield Town

Senior career*
Years	Team	Apps	(Gls)
1963–1977	Huddersfield Town	342	(30)
1974–1975	→ Bolton Wanderers (loan)	3	(0)
1977–1979	Halifax Town	81	(4)
1979–1983	Huddersfield Town	0	(0)
Total		426	(34)

Managerial career
- 1986–1987: Huddersfield Town (caretaker)
- 1987: Huddersfield Town
- 2001: Bradford City (caretaker)
- * Club domestic league appearances and goals

Stephen Smith (28 April 1946 – 13 March 2024) was an English professional football player and manager. He played for Huddersfield Town and Halifax Town. He also managed Huddersfield Town and Bradford City, the latter as caretaker.

Smith spent the vast majority of his professional career at his hometown club. He began his career at Leeds Road as an apprentice in 1961 and remained on the playing staff until the end of the 1976-77 season.

Following two seasons at Halifax Town, Smith returned to Huddersfield during the 1979-80 season, where he was appointed as the club's chief scout. Over the next decade, Smith would perform various roles at Leeds Road. While working as chief scout, he also had spells managing the youth team and the reserve team. He also turned our regularly for the reserves from 1979 to 1983 and even played a further game in the first game in 1981, during an injury crisis.

When long-serving manager Mick Buxton was sacked in December 1986, Smith was asked to step in as caretaker manager. After an impressive spell of four games, where he remained unbeaten, Smith was appointed as the permanent manager in January 1987. While he successfully avoided relegation at the end of the 1986-87 season, the following season didn't start well and he resigned in October 1987, citing pressures of the job. He reverted to his previous role of chief scout and remained at the club until the end of the season, departing for pastures new in the summer of 1988.

After spells working for Bradford City and the Premier League, Smith returned to Huddersfield in April 2012 as Head of Academy Recruitment. He stepped down just a year into this role, though he remained at the club for a time as a scout.

Smith later suffered from dementia. In 2022 a fundraiser was launched for Smith. He died at a care home in Bradford on 13 March 2024, at the age of 77.
