= Bobby Hoy =

English footballer (1950–2024)

Personal information
- Date of birth: 10 January 1950
- Place of birth: Halifax, England
- Date of death: 2 January 2024 (aged 73)
- Position: Midfielder

Senior career*
Years	Team	Apps	(Gls)
1966–1975	Huddersfield Town	144	(18)
1975–1976	Blackburn Rovers	19	(0)
1976–1977	Halifax Town	30	(7)
1977–1978	York City	14	(1)
1978–1981	Rochdale	66	(12)
1981	Macclesfield Town	6	(0)
Total		279	(38)
- * Club domestic league appearances and goals

Robert Hoy (10 January 1950 – 2 January 2024) was an English professional footballer who made 273 appearances and scored 38 goals in the Football League playing as a midfielder for Huddersfield Town, Halifax Town, Blackburn Rovers, York City and Rochdale. He went on to play non-league football for Macclesfield Town. On 3 January 2024, it was announced that Hoy had died at the age of 73.
