= Roy Ellam =

English footballer (1943–2026)

- Ellam with Huddersfield Town, c. 1972

Personal information
- Date of birth: 13 January 1943
- Place of birth: Hemsworth, England
- Date of death: 18 February 2026 (aged 83)
- Position: Centre half

Senior career*
Years	Team	Apps	(Gls)
1961–1966	Bradford City	149	(12)
1966–1972	Huddersfield Town	206	(8)
1972–1974	Leeds United	11	(0)
1974–1975	Huddersfield Town	18	(2)
1975	Philadelphia Atoms	16	(1)
1975–1977	Mossley	83	(2)
1976	Washington Diplomats	24	(2)
1977–1980	Gainsborough Trinity		

Managerial career
- 1979–1980: Gainsborough Trinity
- * Club domestic league appearances and goals

Roy Ellam (13 January 1943 – 18 February 2026) was an English professional footballer who played as a centre half in the Football League for three West Yorkshire teams, Bradford City, Huddersfield Town and Leeds United, during the 1960s and 1970s.

== Career ==
Born in Hemsworth, Ellam started his career at Bradford City before joining Huddersfield Town, then Leeds United, before returning to Huddersfield. Although Leeds won the First Division during his time at the club, Ellam made only four appearances during the campaign. He then played in the North American Soccer League for Philadelphia Atoms and Washington Diplomats before returning to non-league football in England with Mossley, where he scored twice in 83 appearances, and Gainsborough Trinity, where he was manager. From 1983 to 1992, Ellam ran the Nelson Inn public house in Thornhill Lees near Dewsbury, and worked in his daughter's fitness centre.

== Death ==
Ellam died on 18 February 2026, aged 83.
