= Linn (given name) =

Linn is a unisex given name or nickname. It may refer to:

== Given name ==
=== Women ===
- Linn Gestblom (born 1994), Swedish biathlete
- Linn Githmark (born 1982), Norwegian curler
- Linn Gossé (born 1986), Norwegian handball player
- Linn Gottfridsson (born 1974), Swedish writer
- Linn Grant (born 1999), Swedish golfer
- Linn Kazmaier (born 2006), German biathlete
- Linn Siri Jensen (born 1961), Norwegian team handball goalkeeper and coach
- Linn Laupsa (born 1977), Norwegian politician
- Linn Nyrønning (born 1981), Norwegian footballer
- Linn Sandström (born 1991), Brazilian-born Swedish-Australian professional boxer
- Linn Skåber (born 1970), Norwegian actress, singer, comedian and writer
- Linn Stalsberg (born 1971), Norwegian journalist, columnist and author
- Linn Svahn (born 1999), Swedish cross-country skier
- Linn T. Sunne (born 1971), Norwegian children's writer
- Linn Hansson (born 1997), Swedish handballer
- Linn van Aanholt (born 2001), Dutch rower

=== Men ===
- Linn Boyd (1800–1859), American politician
- Linn Farrish (1901–1944), American rugby union player and alleged spy for the Soviet Union
- Linn A. Forrest (1905–1987), American architect
- Linn F. Mollenauer (1937–2021), American physicist
- Linn Sheldon (1919–2006), American children's television host and actor

== Nickname ==
- Linn Berggren (born 1970), Swedish singer-songwriter, former member of the pop music band Ace of Base
- Linn Ullmann (born 1966), Norwegian author and journalist
