= Stalsberg =

Stalsberg is a surname. Notable people with the surname include:

- Helge Stalsberg (born 1932), Norwegian physician
- Linn Stalsberg (born 1971), Norwegian journalist, columnist, public debater and author
- Tom Stalsberg (born 1957), Norwegian culture journalist, sports journalist and lyricist
