= John L. Murray (politician) =

American politician (1806–1842)

Member of the U.S. House of Representatives from Kentucky's 1st district
- In office March 4, 1837 – March 3, 1839
- Preceded by: Linn Boyd
- Succeeded by: Linn Boyd

Member of the Kentucky House of Representatives
- In office 1830–1835

Personal details
- Born: January 25, 1806 Pennsylvania, U.S.
- Died: January 31, 1842 (aged 36) Wadesboro, Kentucky, U.S.
- Resting place: Irvin Cemetery
- Party: Democratic
- Profession: Politician, lawyer

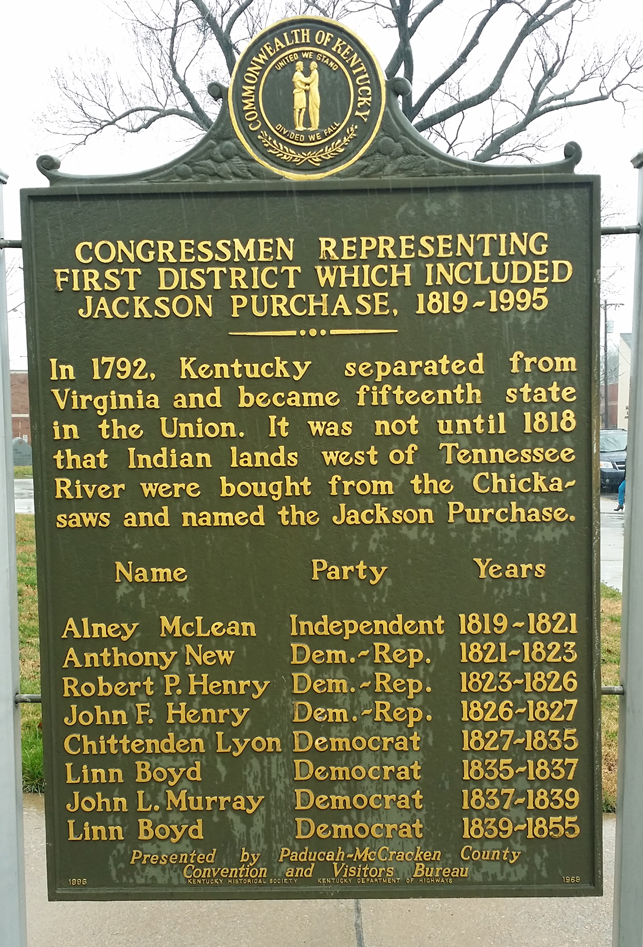
Sign in front of the McCracken, Kentucky Courthouse (in Paducah, Kentucky) commemorating early members of the U.S. House of Representatives representing Jackson Purchase (U.S. historical region). The "First District" in the title actually changed over time. It refers to the Jackson Purchase, which was in the 5th district from 1819 to 1823, the 12th district until 1833, and then the 1st district until the end of the sign's lineage in 1855.

John L. Murray (January 25, 1806 – January 31, 1842) was a U.S. representative from Kentucky.

Born in Pennsylvania, Murray studied law and was admitted to the bar. He moved to Kentucky and held several local offices. He served three terms in the Kentucky House of Representatives 1830–1835.

Murray was elected as a Democrat to the Twenty-fifth Congress (March 4, 1837 – March 3, 1839). He died in Wadesboro, Kentucky, January 31, 1842. He was interred in Irvin Cemetery.

Murray, Kentucky - a town in the southwest portion of the state - was named in honor of him.

U.S. House of Representatives
Preceded by Linn Boyd	Member of the U.S. House of Representatives from Kentucky's 1st congressional district 1837–1839	Succeeded by Linn Boyd
