= 1856 Democratic National Convention =

American political convention

- 1856 presidential election
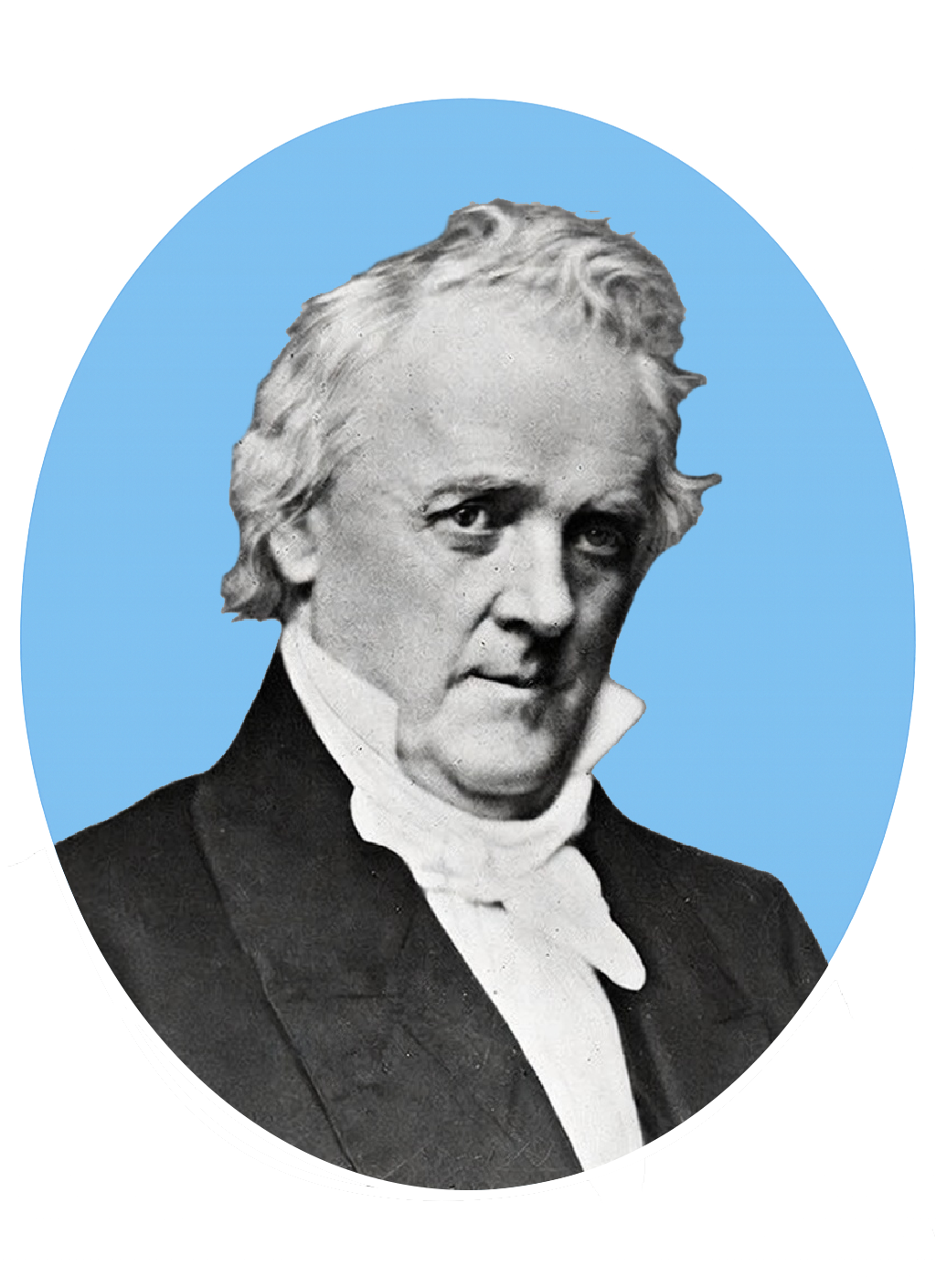
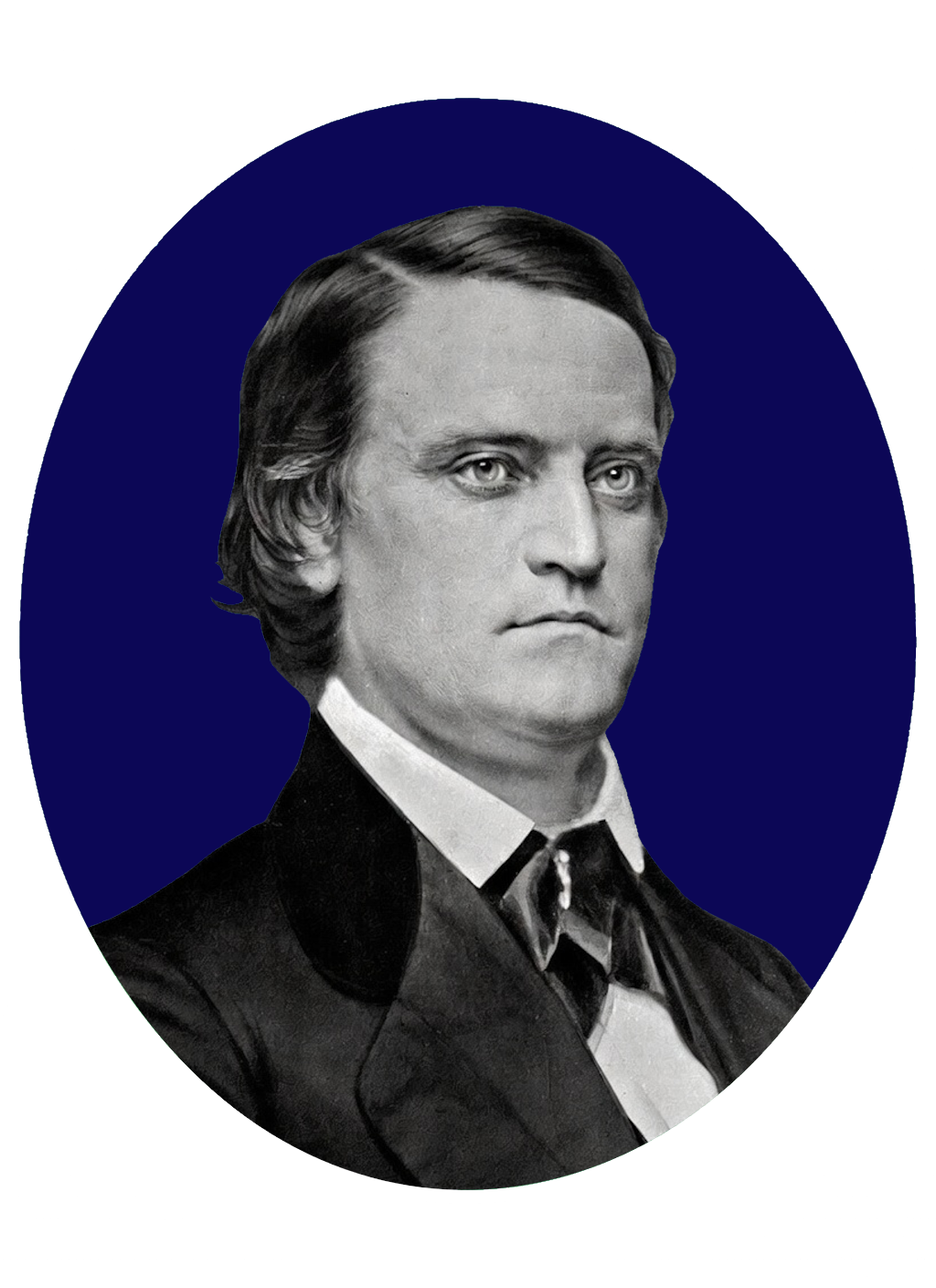
- Nominees; Buchanan and Breckinridge

Convention
- Date(s): June 2–6, 1856
- City: Cincinnati, Ohio
- Venue: Smith and Nixon's Hall

Candidates
- Presidential nominee: James Buchanan of Pennsylvania
- Vice-presidential nominee: John C. Breckinridge of Kentucky

The 1856 Democratic National Convention was a presidential nominating convention that met from June 2 to June 6 in Cincinnati, Ohio. It was held to nominate the Democratic Party's candidates for president and vice president in the 1856 election. The convention selected former Secretary of State James Buchanan of Pennsylvania for president and former Representative John C. Breckinridge of Kentucky for vice president.

Incumbent Democratic President Franklin Pierce's standing with the public had been badly damaged by "Bleeding Kansas," the civil strife in Kansas Territory over slavery. Many dissatisfied Democrats lined up behind Buchanan, who had served as Pierce's ambassador to Britain and thus had avoided the controversy over Bleeding Kansas, while a smaller group of Democrats supported Senator Stephen A. Douglas of Illinois. Buchanan led on the first ballot and slowly grew his support on subsequent ballots, leading Pierce to instruct his delegates to back Douglas. Douglas agreed to withdraw his name after receiving assurances that Buchanan would not seek re-election in 1860, allowing Buchanan to clinch the nomination on the seventeenth ballot. Pierce became the first and only elected president who was an active candidate for reelection to be denied his party's nomination for a second term.

Eleven candidates received votes on the first vice presidential ballot, with Congressman John A. Quitman winning a plurality of the vote. The delegates lined up unanimously behind Breckinridge on the second ballot, giving him the vice presidential nomination. The Democratic ticket went on to win the 1856 election, defeating the Republican ticket of John C. Frémont and William L. Dayton and the American Party ticket of Millard Fillmore and Andrew J. Donelson.

== Background ==
Senators James A. Bayard, Jesse D. Bright, and John Slidell (of Delaware, Indiana, and Louisiana respectively) helped to organize and orchestrate James Buchanan's eventual nomination in the convention.

The Democratic Party was wounded from its major losses in the 1854–1855 midterm elections. The party faced continued north–south sectional division over slavery-related issues, especially the Kansas–Nebraska Act of 1854 and subsequent violence known as "Bleeding Kansas" from the civil strife in the Kansas Territory during its campaign for statehood. Two notable Democratic politicians, President Pierce and Senator Stephen Douglas of Illinois, were seen as being at the center of the controversies, which led many party members to look elsewhere for a new compromise candidate for president.

James Buchanan had been a candidate for president at the 1852 Democratic National Convention, and after the 1852 election he agreed to serve as Pierce's ambassador to Britain. Buchanan's service abroad conveniently placed him outside of the country while the debate over the Kansas–Nebraska Act roiled the nation. Powerful Senators like John Slidell, Jesse Bright, and James A. Bayard lined up behind Buchanan, presenting him as an experienced leader who could appeal to the North and South. While Buchanan did not overtly seek the presidency, he also took no action to discourage his supporters.

== Proceedings ==
Called to order at noon on Monday, June 2, by the National Committee chair Robert Milligan McLane, Samuel Medary was made the temporary president. The first day, the convention appointed committees on credentials, organization, and resolutions.

On the second day the organization committee (John L. Dawson, chair) report was adopted and John Elliot Ward of Georgia was made the convention's president. The committee on credentials (James A. Bayard Jr., chair) settled a dispute over the Missouri delegation, but needed more time for the thorny problem of competing delegations from New York.

June 4 saw the adoption of a platform (former National Committee chair Benjamin F. Hallett headed the committee on resolutions); the domestic portions were supported unanimously, the foreign policy planks by large margins. A separately reported plank on a railroad to the Pacific coast failed by a vote of 120 to 154.

On June 5, the New York problem was finally settled by seating half of each of the competing delegations. Nominations for President were then made.

== Presidential nomination ==
=== Presidential candidates ===
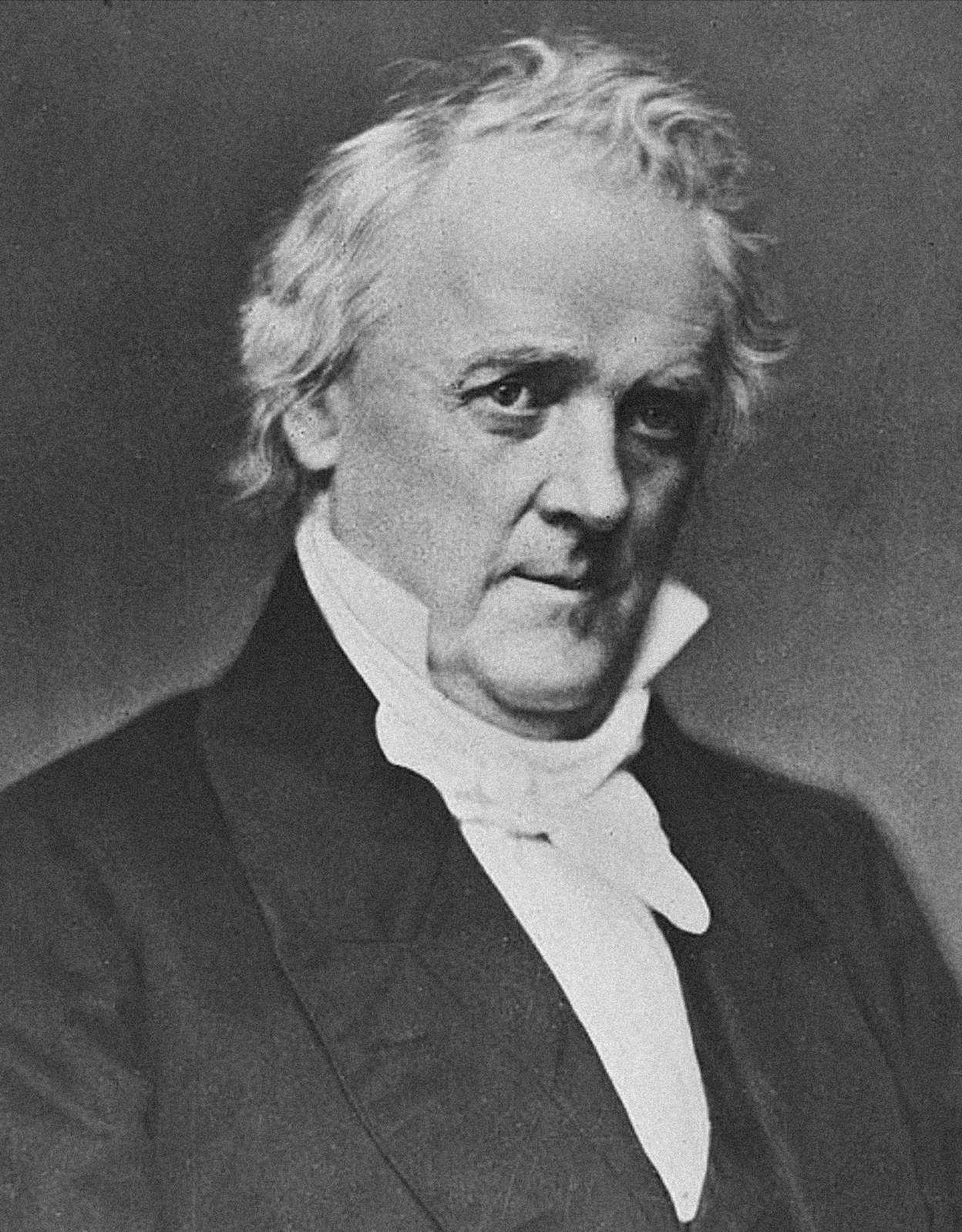
Minister to Great Britain
James Buchanan
of Pennsylvania

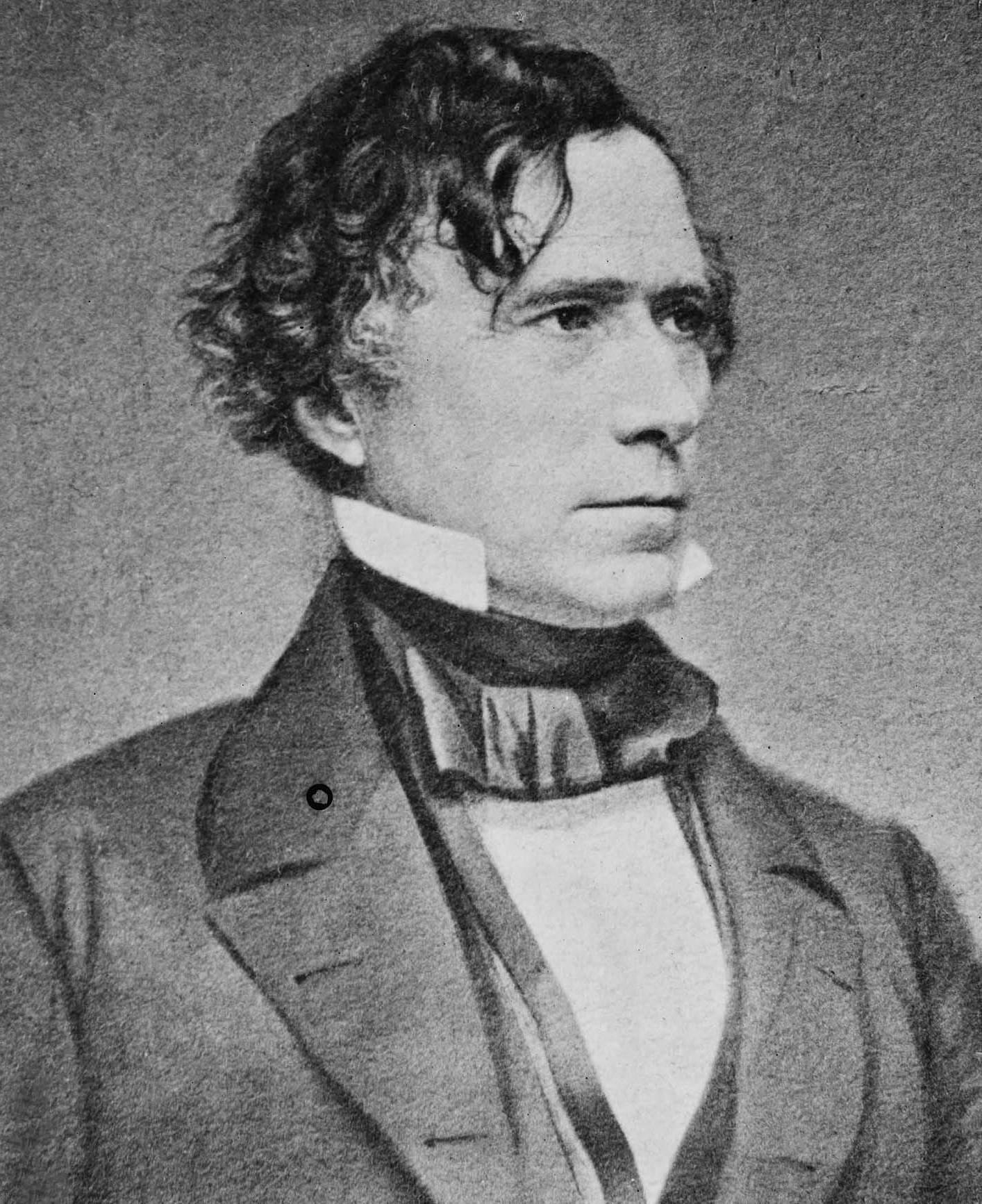
President
Franklin Pierce
of New Hampshire

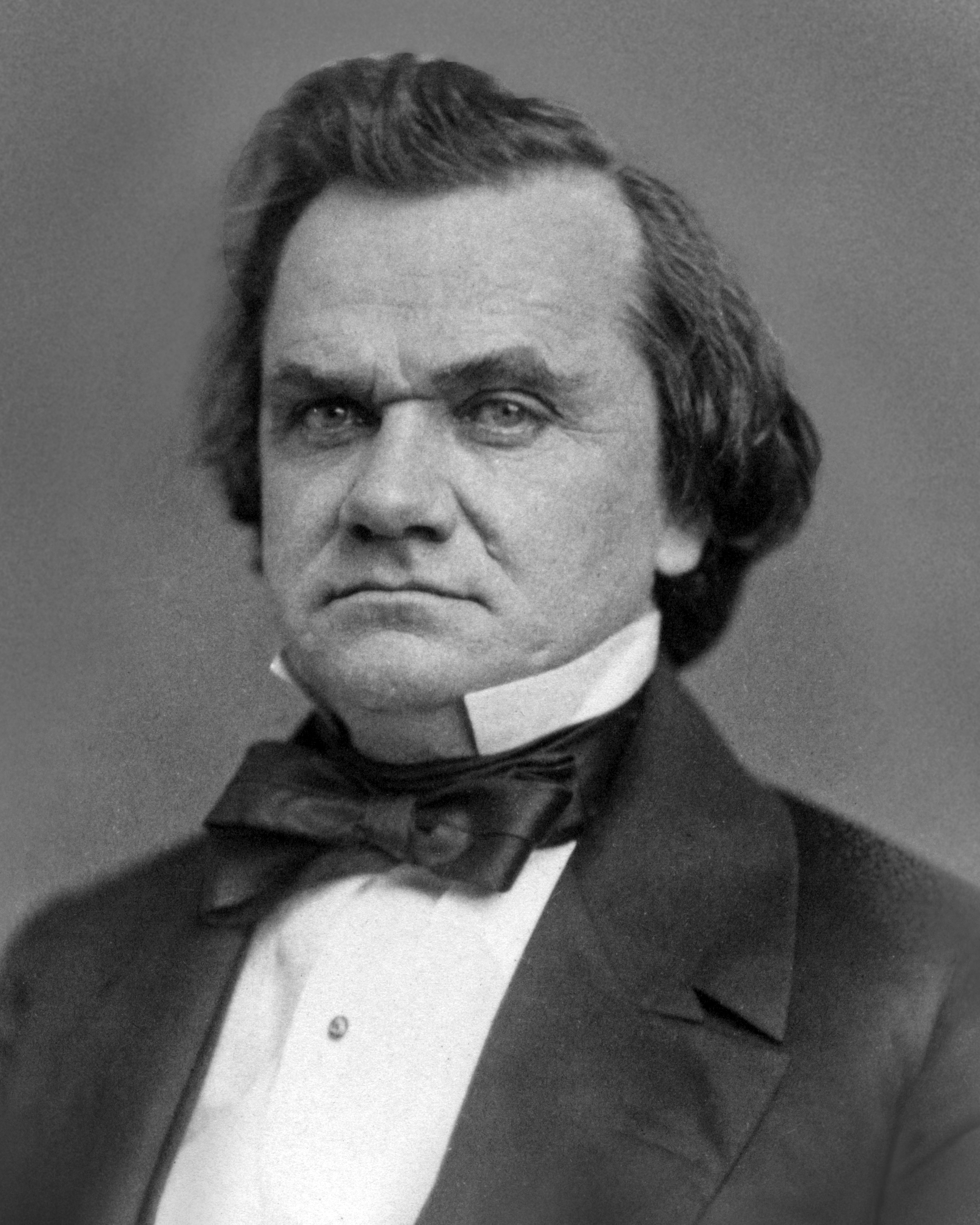
Senator
Stephen A. Douglas
of Illinois

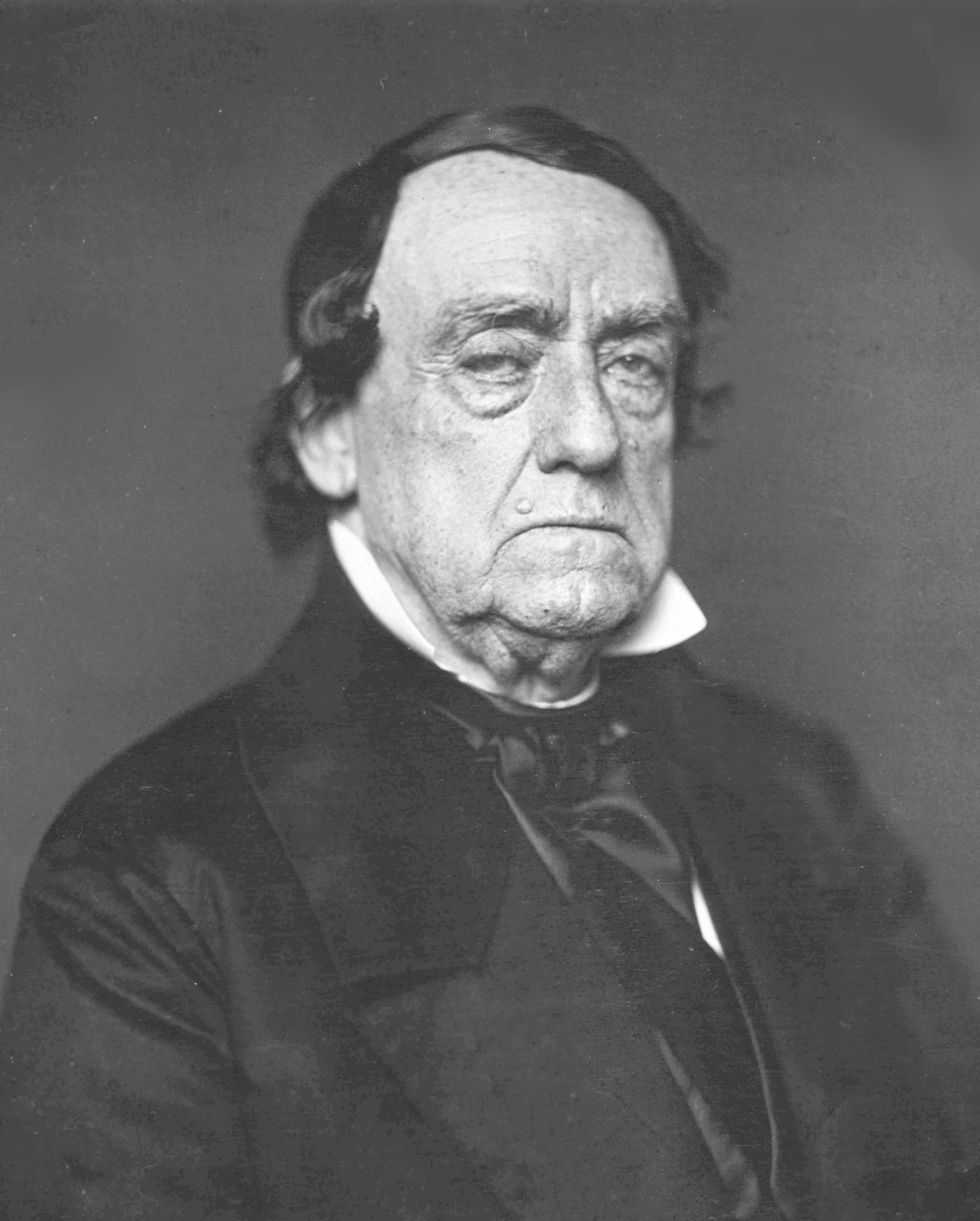
Senator
Lewis Cass
of Michigan

On the first ballot, Pierce received 122 votes, many of them from the South, to Buchanan's 135, with Douglas and Lewis Cass receiving the remaining votes. The next four ballots produced largely the same result, but Pierce's support began to gradually decline starting on the sixth ballot. Buchanan's support steadily increased over the course of the vote, but the biggest momentum was with Douglas, who started the day with the support of only a few midwestern delegations and had nearly doubled his delegate count by the time balloting adjourned for the day. By the end of the day fourteen ballots had been completed; while none of the three main candidates were able to get two-thirds of the vote, it was by now obvious that Pierce would not be nominated for a second term.

Before the second day of balloting, Pierce directed his supporters to break for Douglas, reluctantly withdrawing his name in a last-ditch effort to deny the nomination to Buchanan, hoping this would either begin a stampede towards Douglas, or deadlock the vote for long enough for a compromise candidate to emerge. Douglas, only 43 years of age, believed that he could be nominated in 1860 if he let the older Buchanan win this time, and received assurances from Buchanan's managers that this would be the case. After two more deadlocked ballots, Douglas's managers withdrew his name, leaving Buchanan as the clear winner. To soften the blow to Pierce, the convention issued a resolution of "unqualified approbation" in praise of his administration. This loss marked the first (and until 2024, only) time in U.S. history that an elected president who was an active candidate for reelection was not nominated for a second term.

Presidential Ballot (1st Day)
	1st	2nd	3rd	4th	5th	6th	7th	8th	9th	10th	11th	12th	13th	14th
Buchanan	135.5	139	139.5	141.5	140	155	143.5	147.5	146	147.5	147.5	148	150	152.5
Pierce	122.5	119.5	119	119	119.5	107.5	89	87	87	80.5	80	79	77.5	75
Douglas	33	31.5	32	30	31	28	58	56	56	62.5	63	63.5	63	63
Cass	5	6	5.5	5.5	5.5	5.5	5.5	5.5	7	5.5	5.5	5.5	5.5	5.5
Not Voting	0	0	0	0	0	0	0	0	0	0	0	0	0	0

Presidential Ballot (2nd Day)
	15th	16th	17th
Buchanan	168.5	168	296
Pierce	3.5	0	0
Douglas	118.5	122	0
Cass	4.5	6	0
Not Voting	1	0	0

1st Day of Presidential Balloting / 4th Day of Convention (Thursday, June 5, 1856)

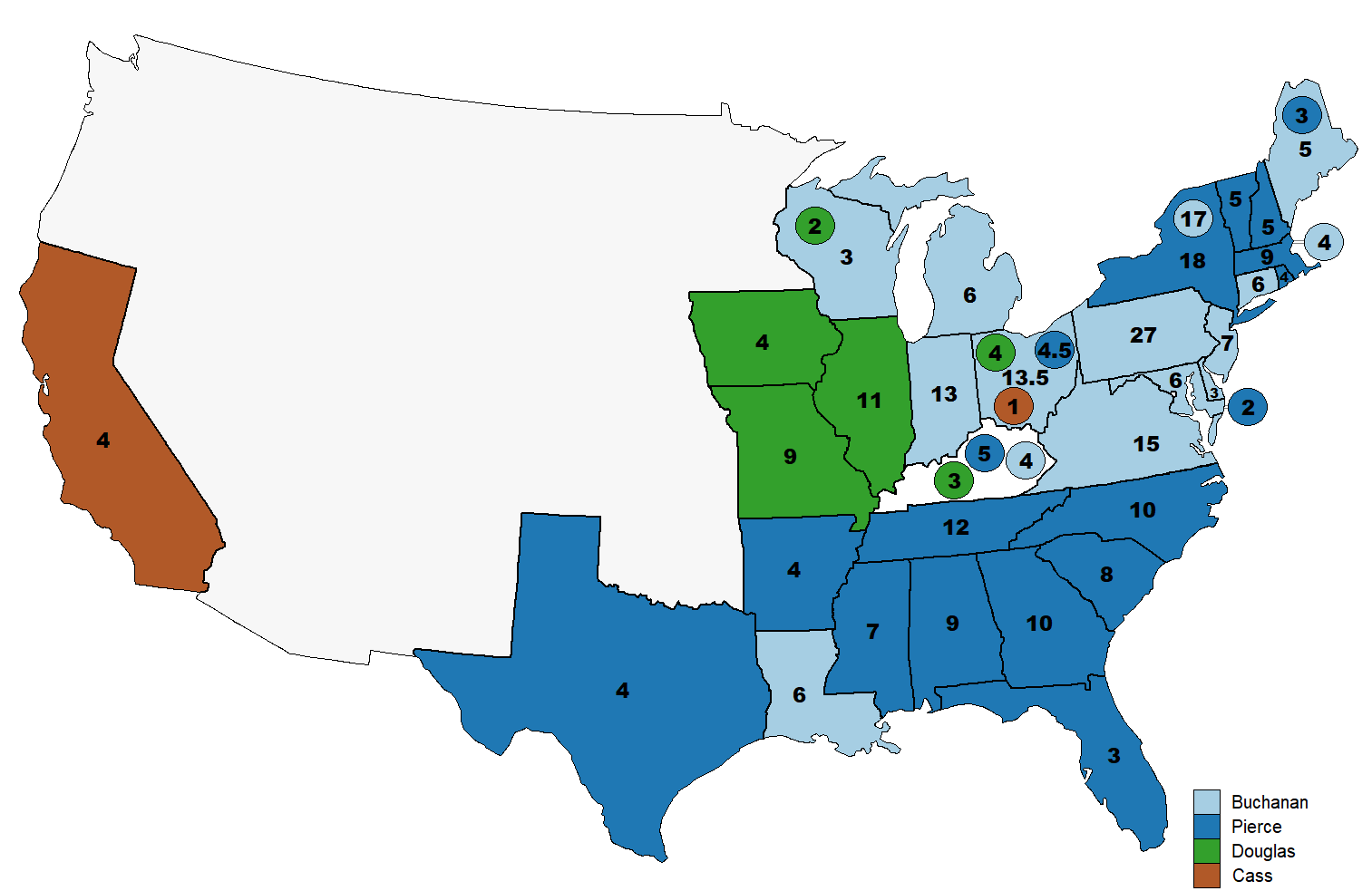
1st Presidential Ballot

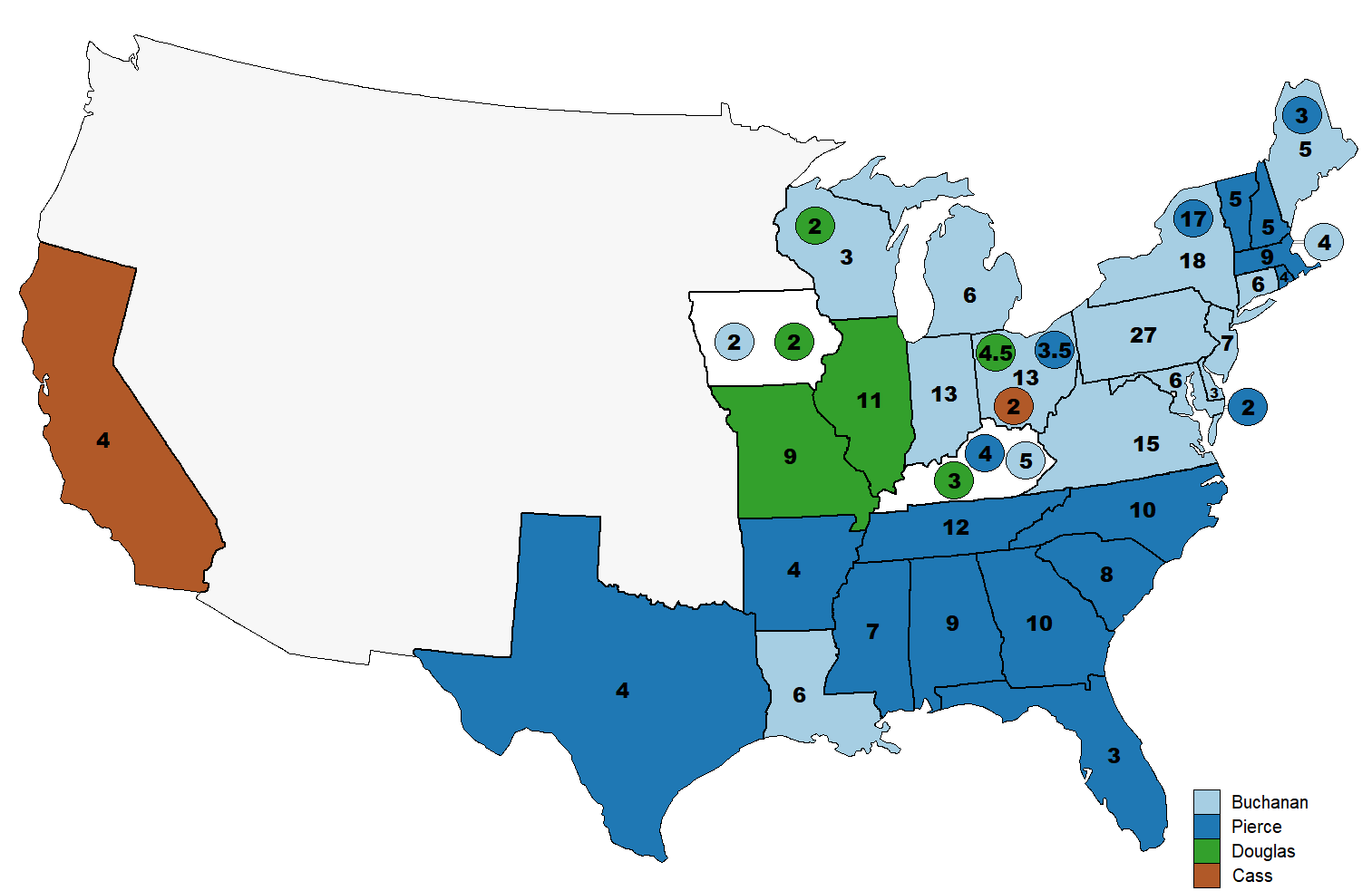
2nd Presidential Ballot

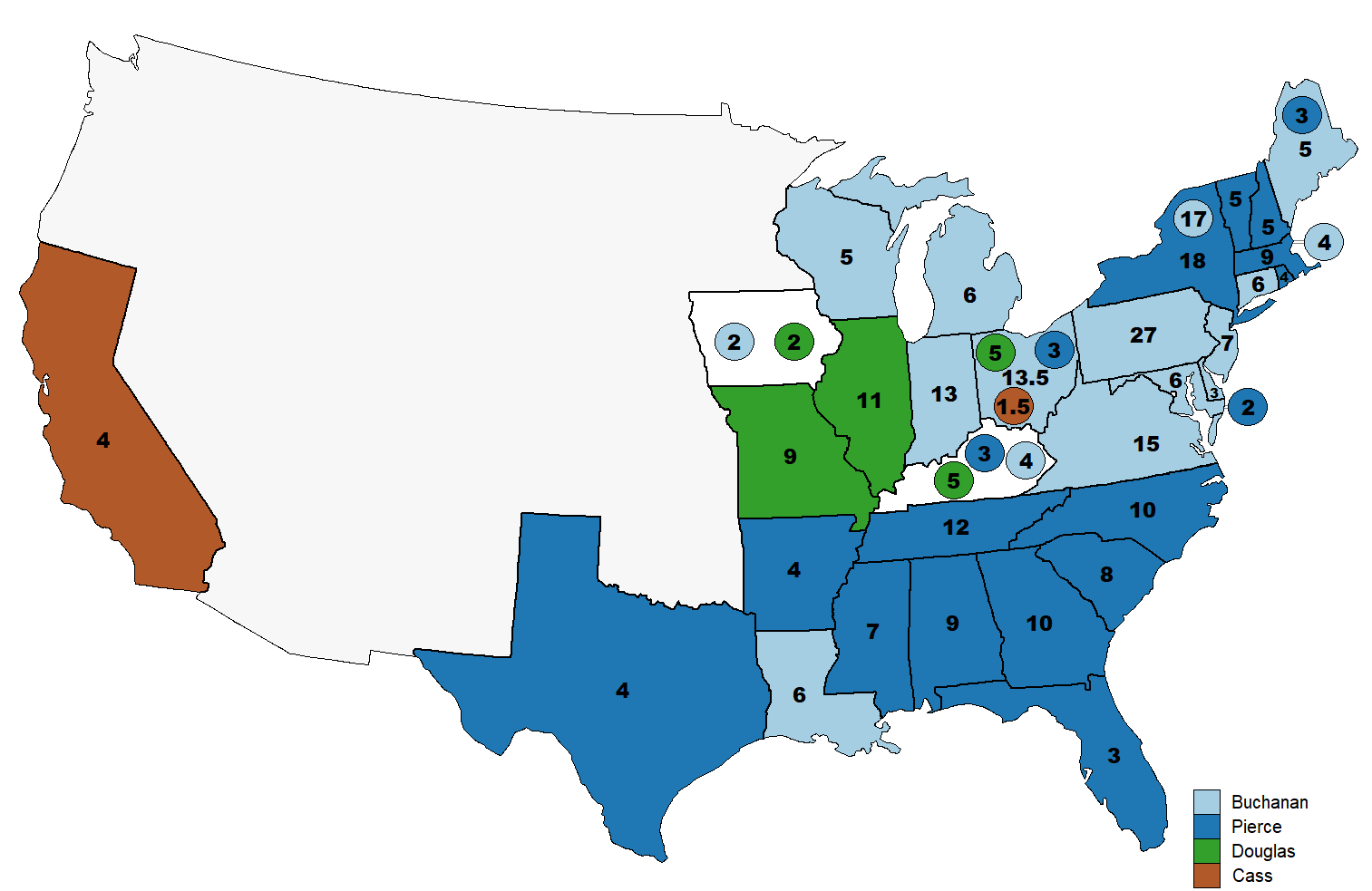
3rd Presidential Ballot

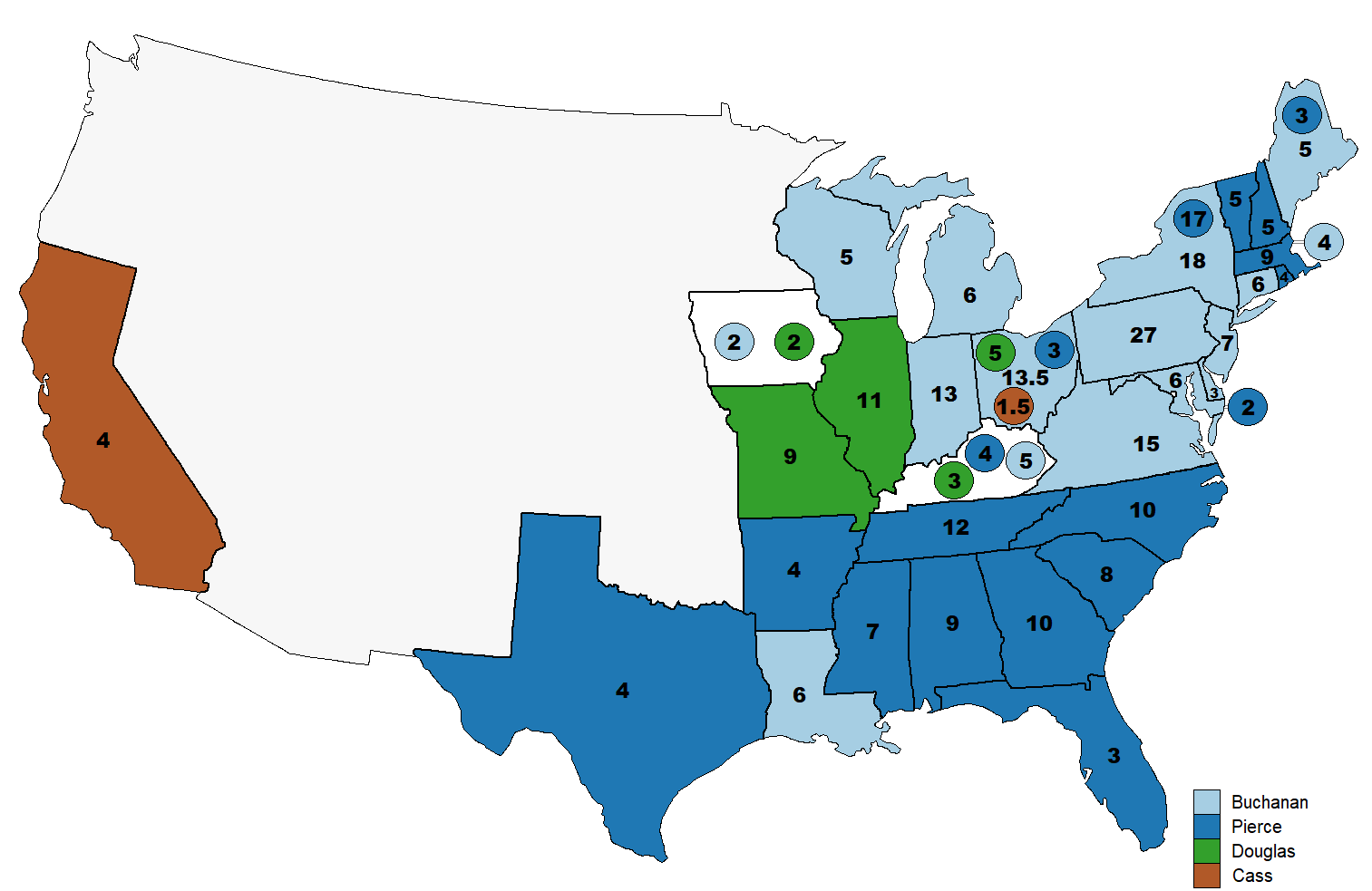
4th Presidential Ballot

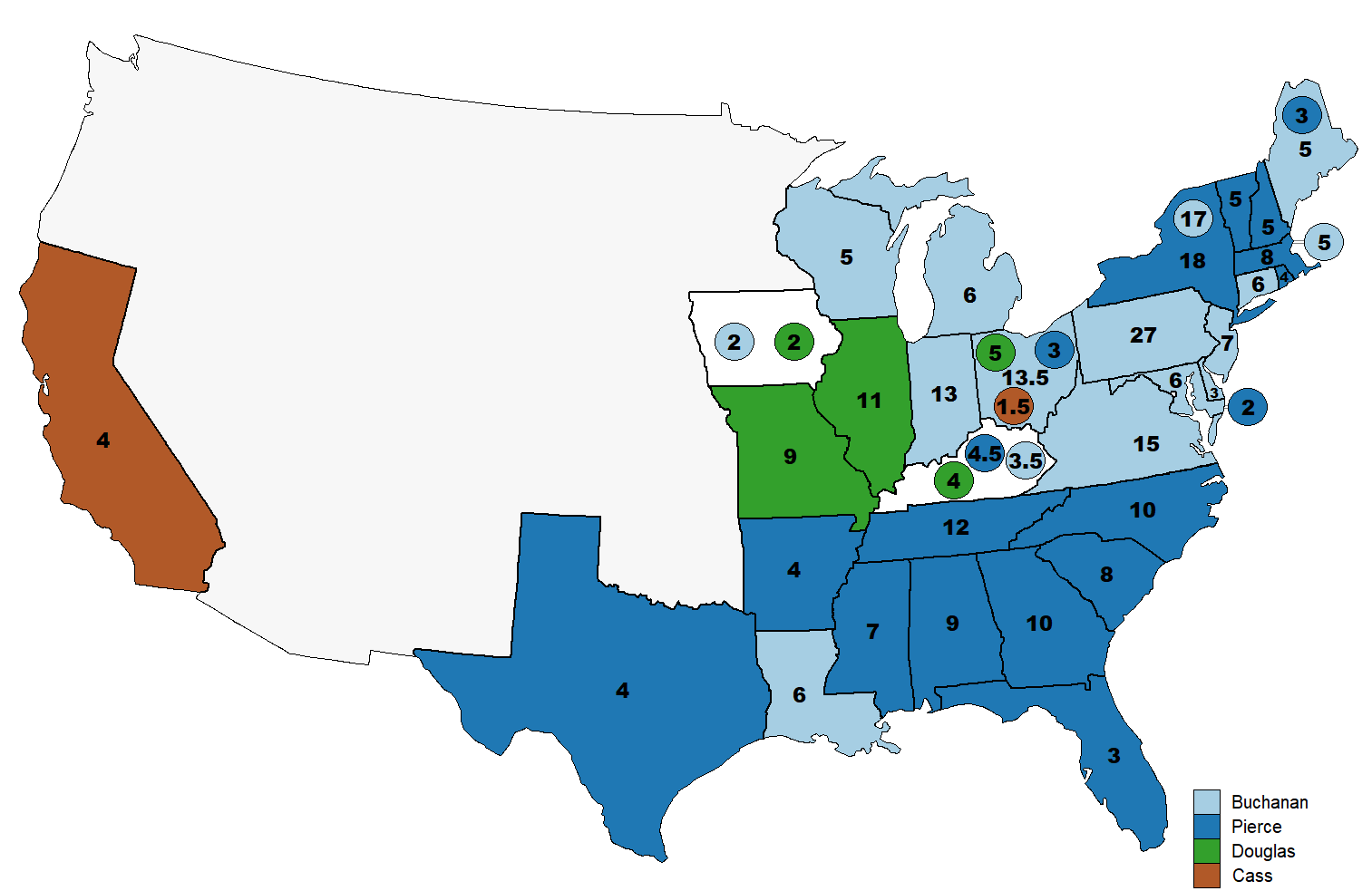
5th Presidential Ballot

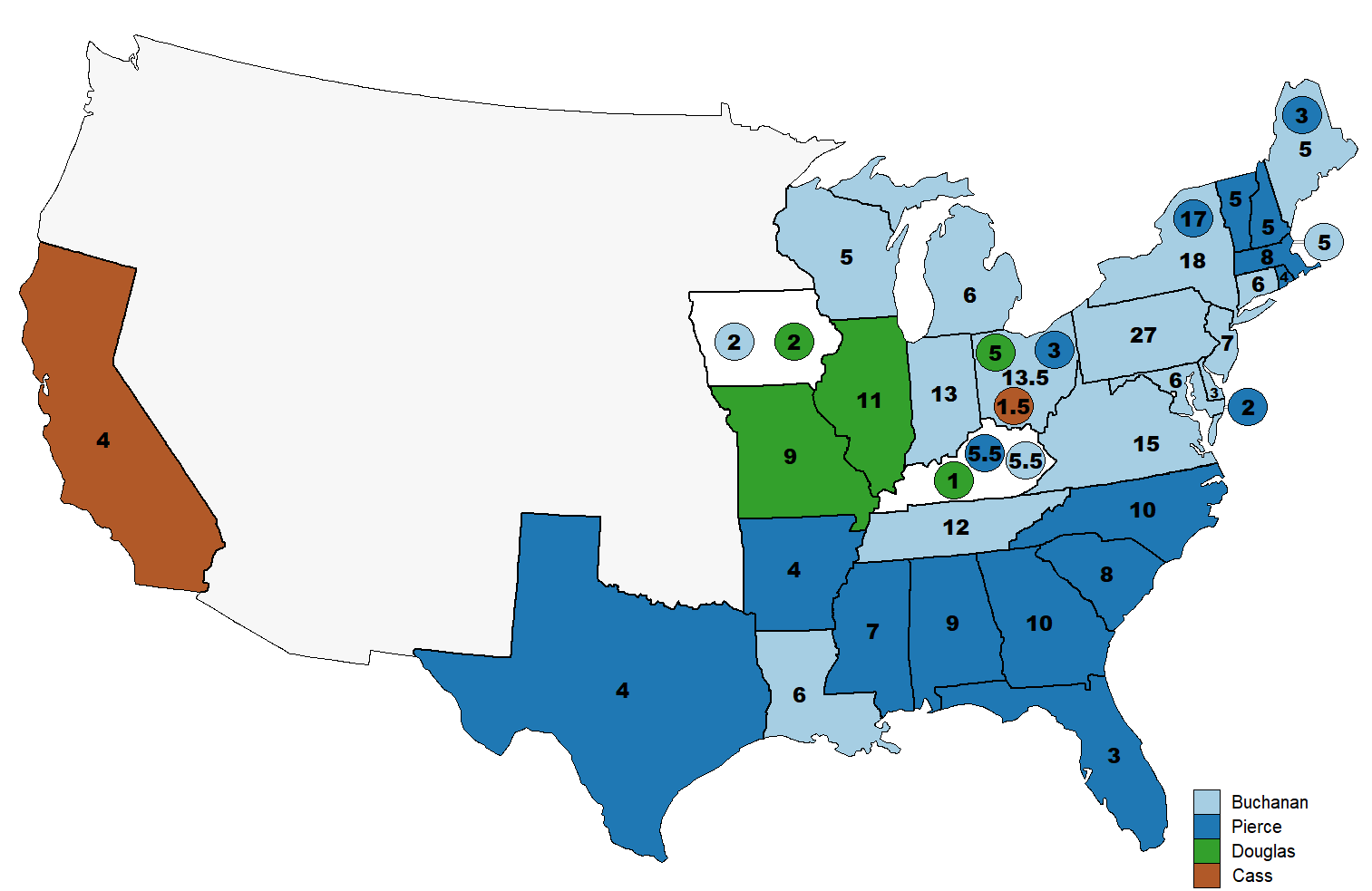
6th Presidential Ballot

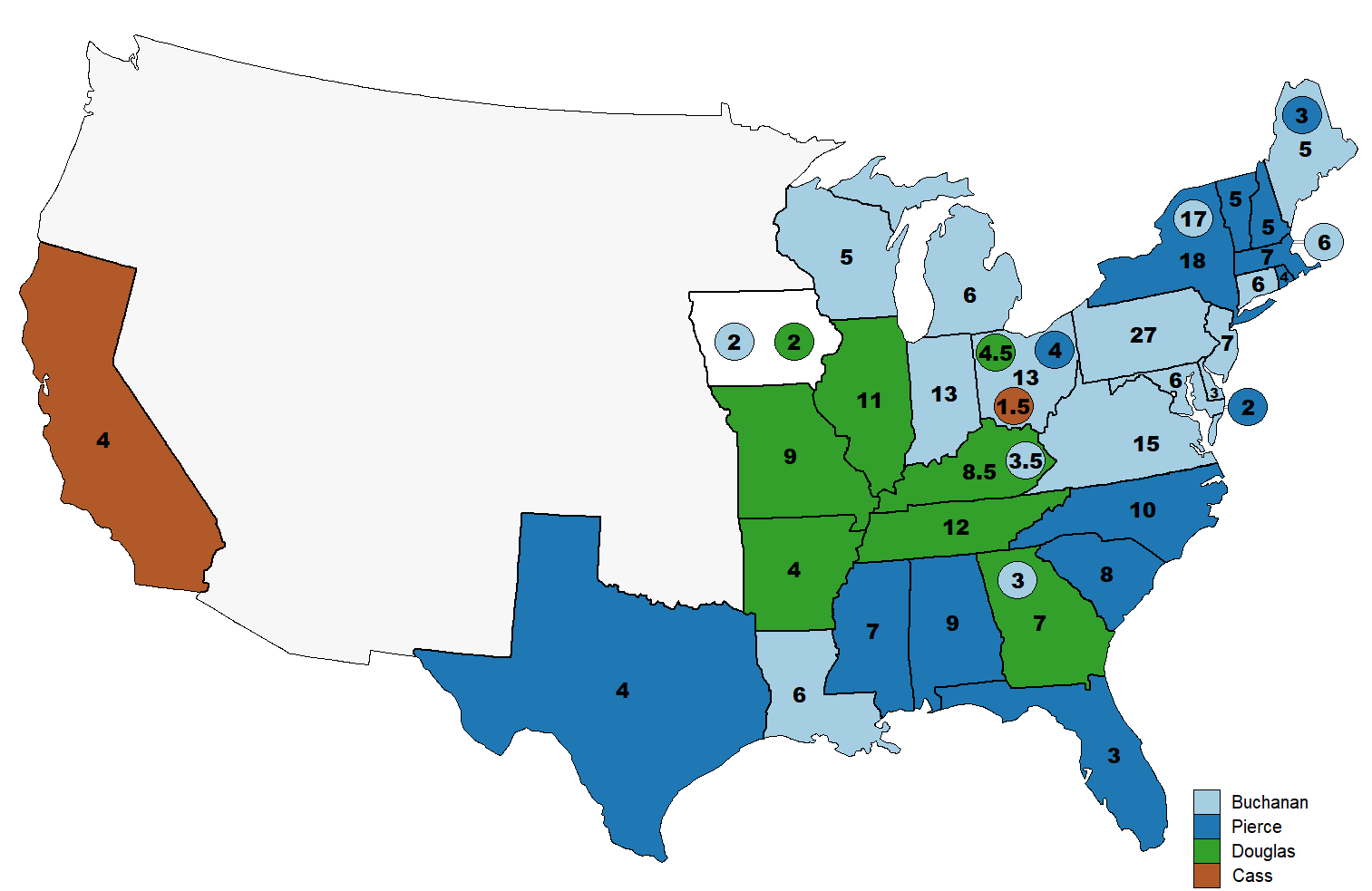
7th Presidential Ballot

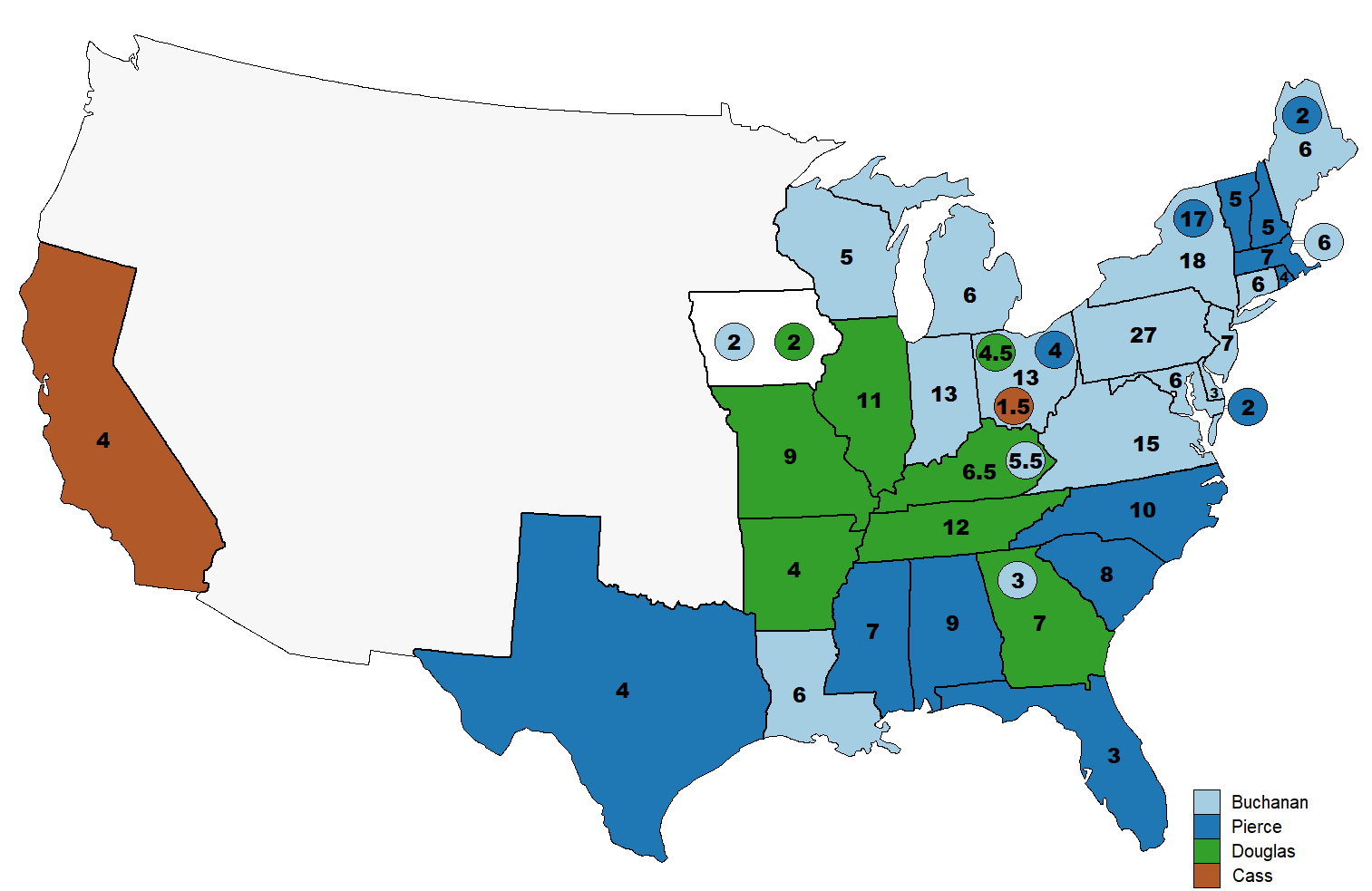
8th Presidential Ballot

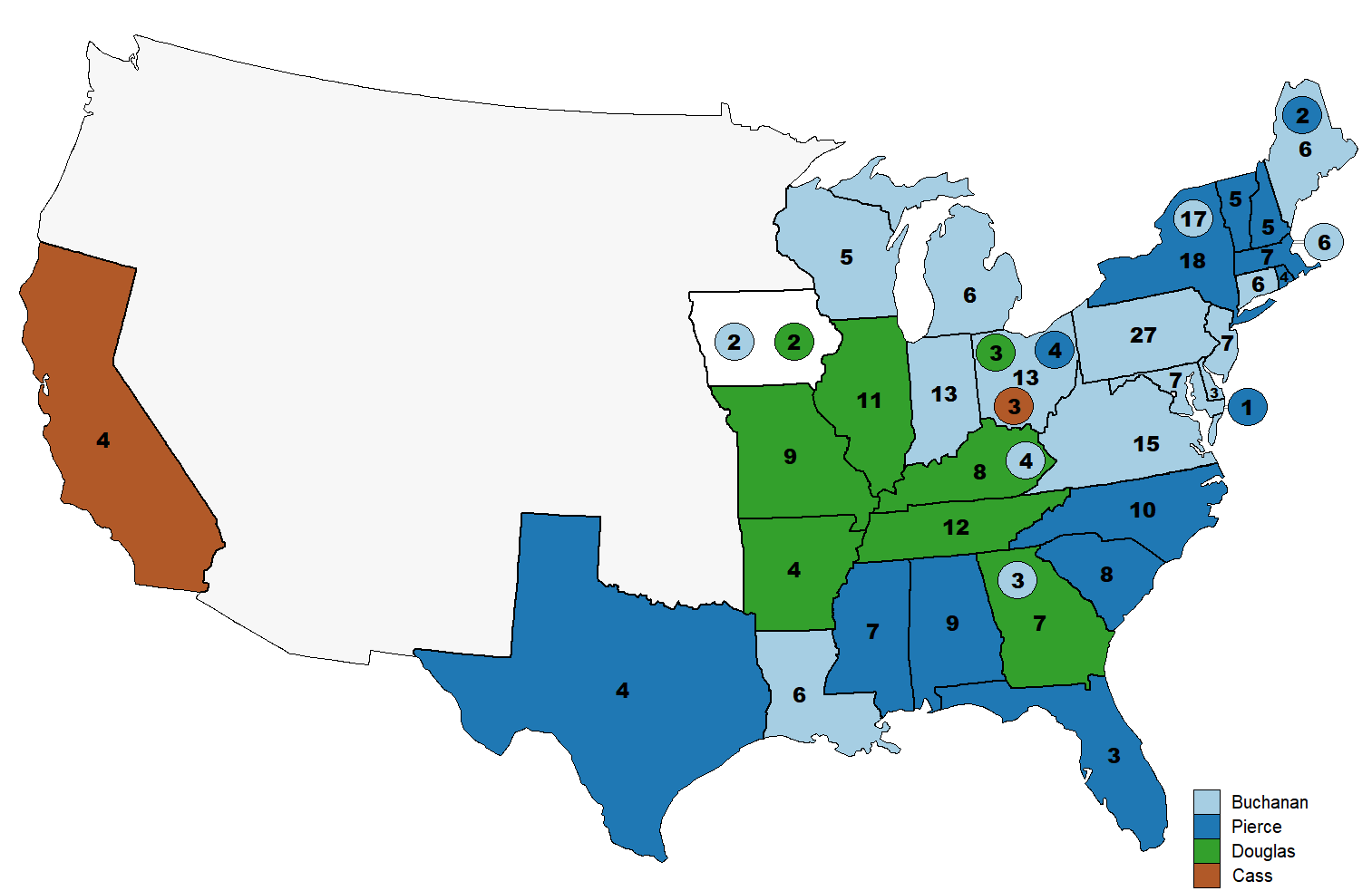
9th Presidential Ballot

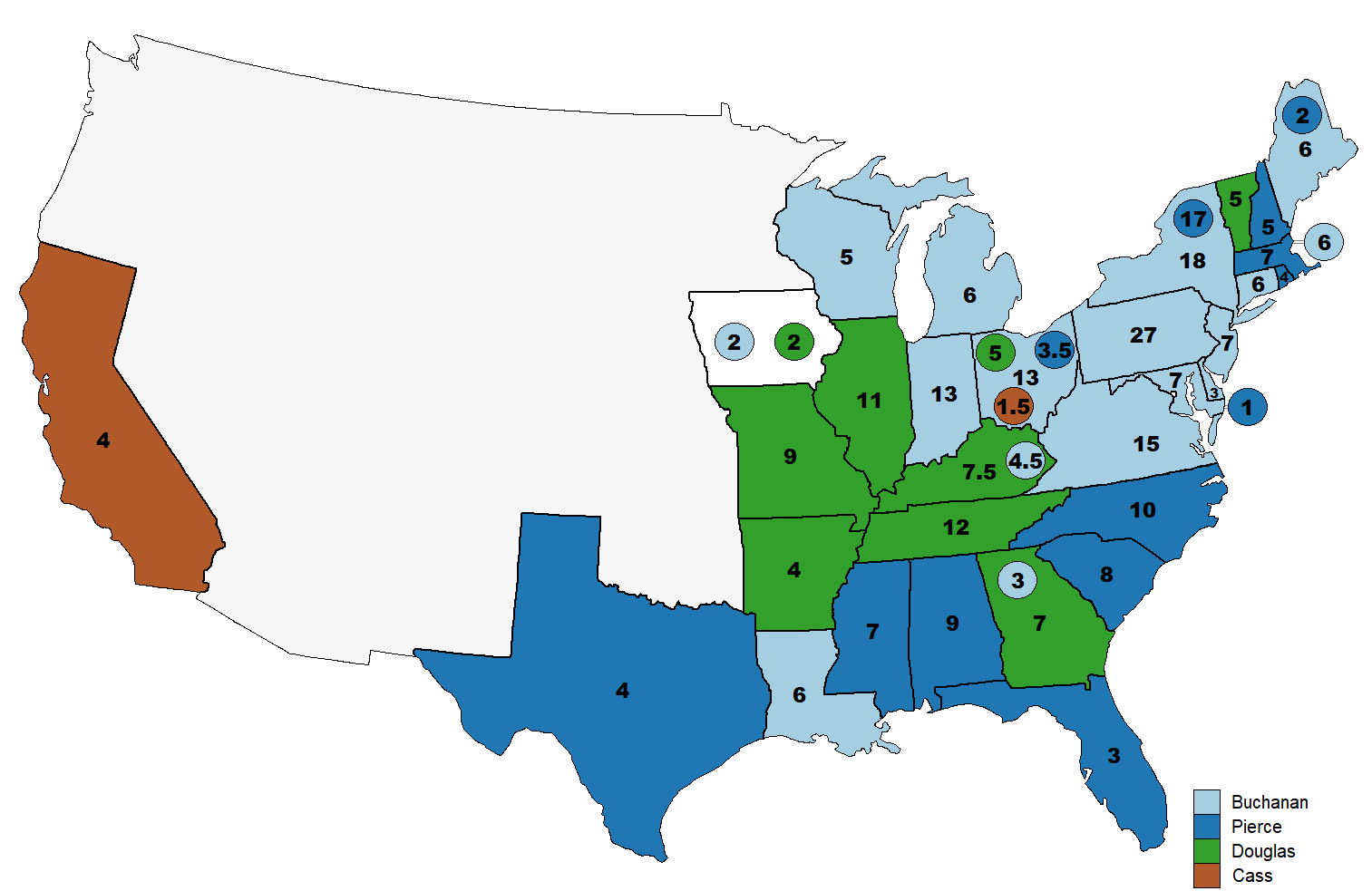
10th Presidential Ballot

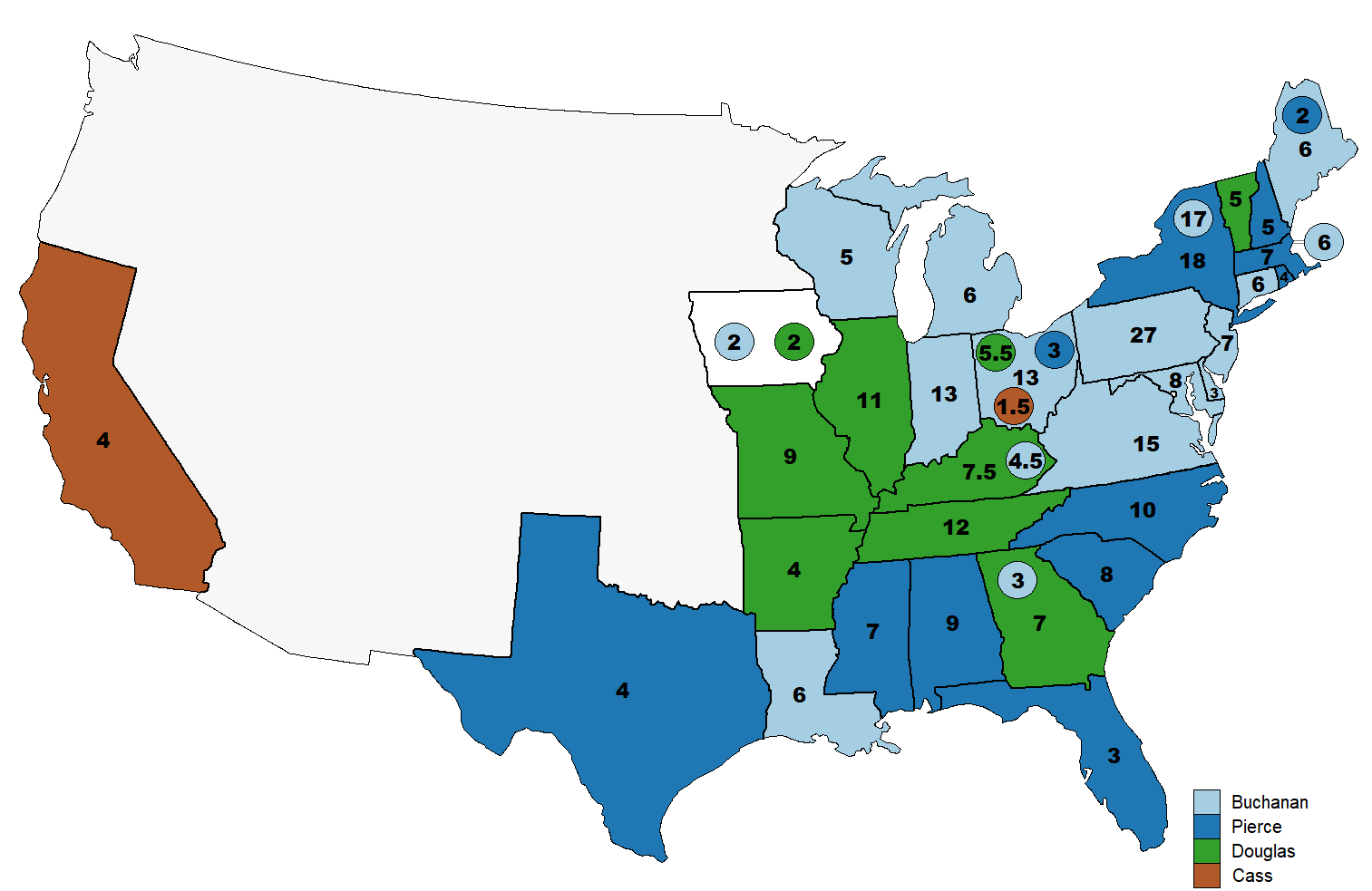
11th Presidential Ballot

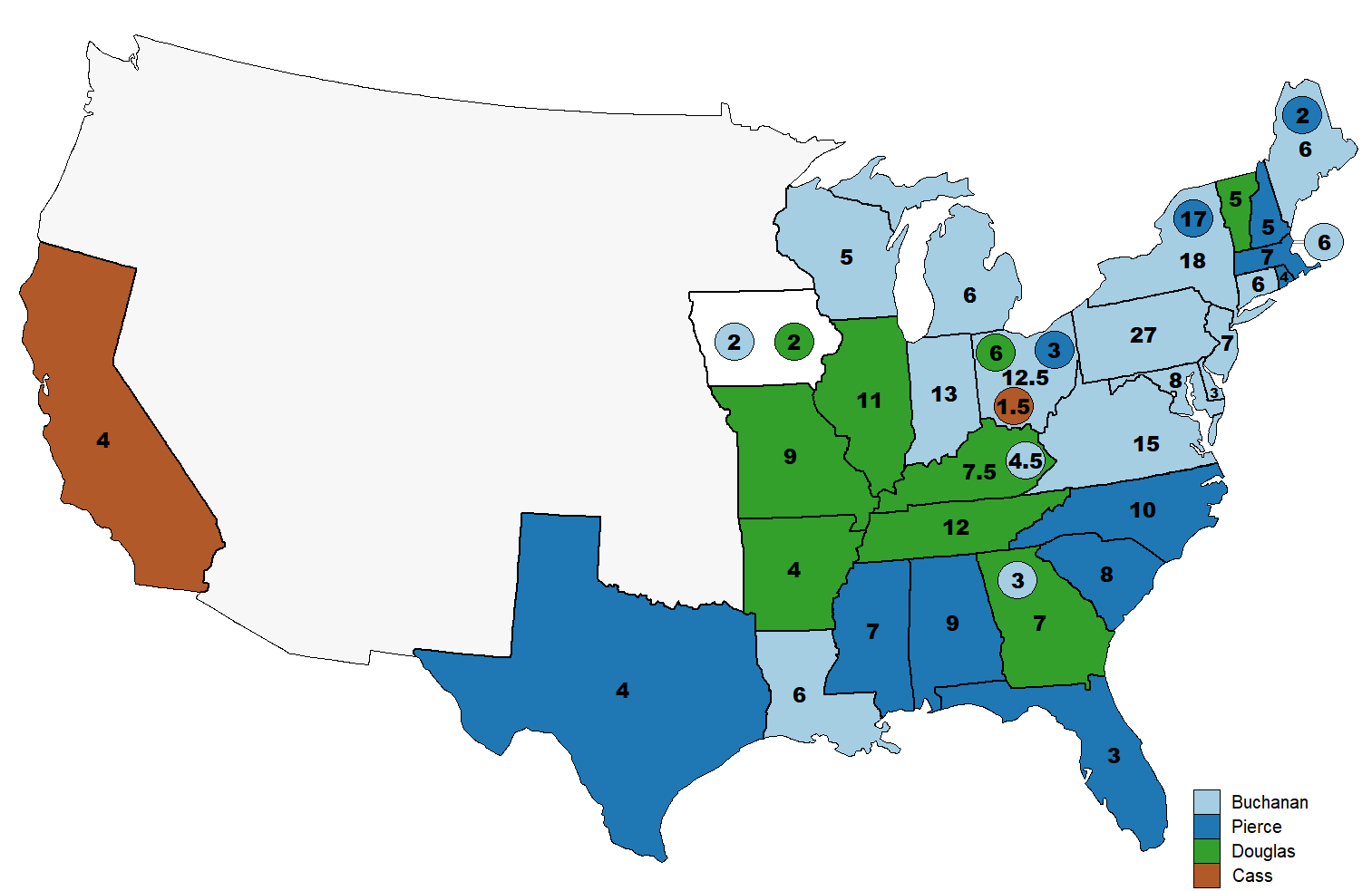
12th Presidential Ballot

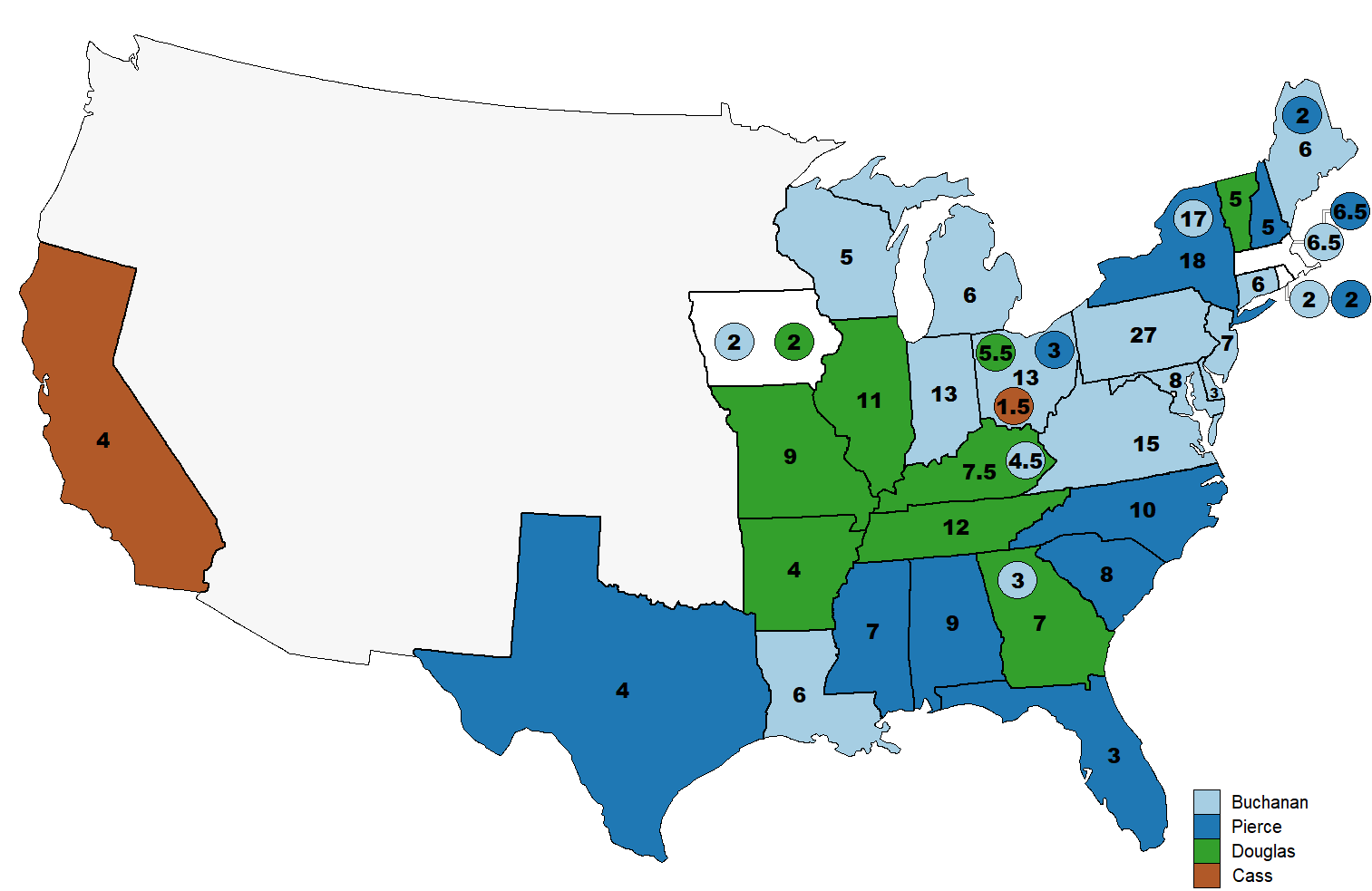
13th Presidential Ballot

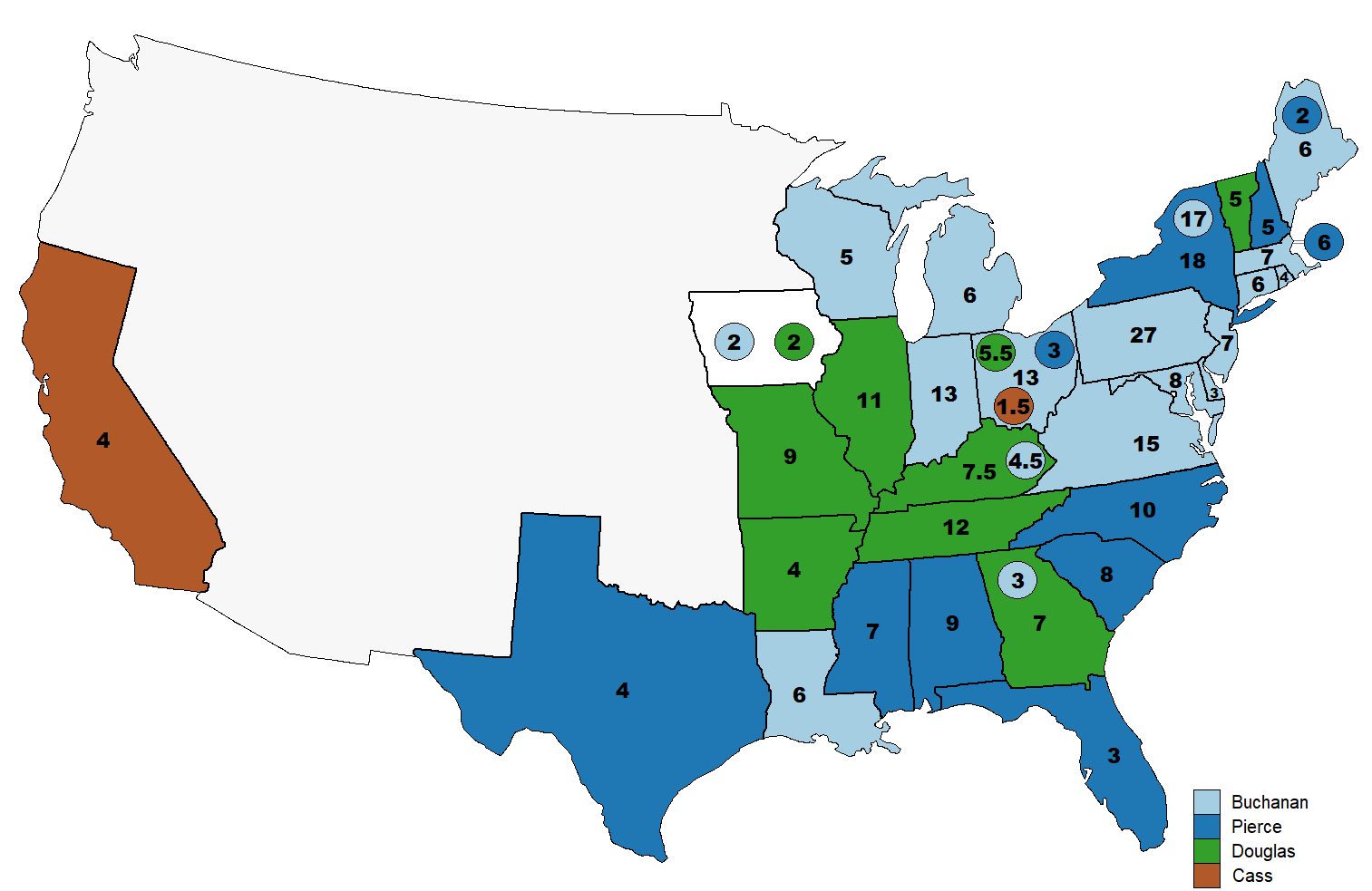
14th Presidential Ballot

2nd Day of Presidential Balloting / 5th Day of Convention (Friday, June 6, 1856)

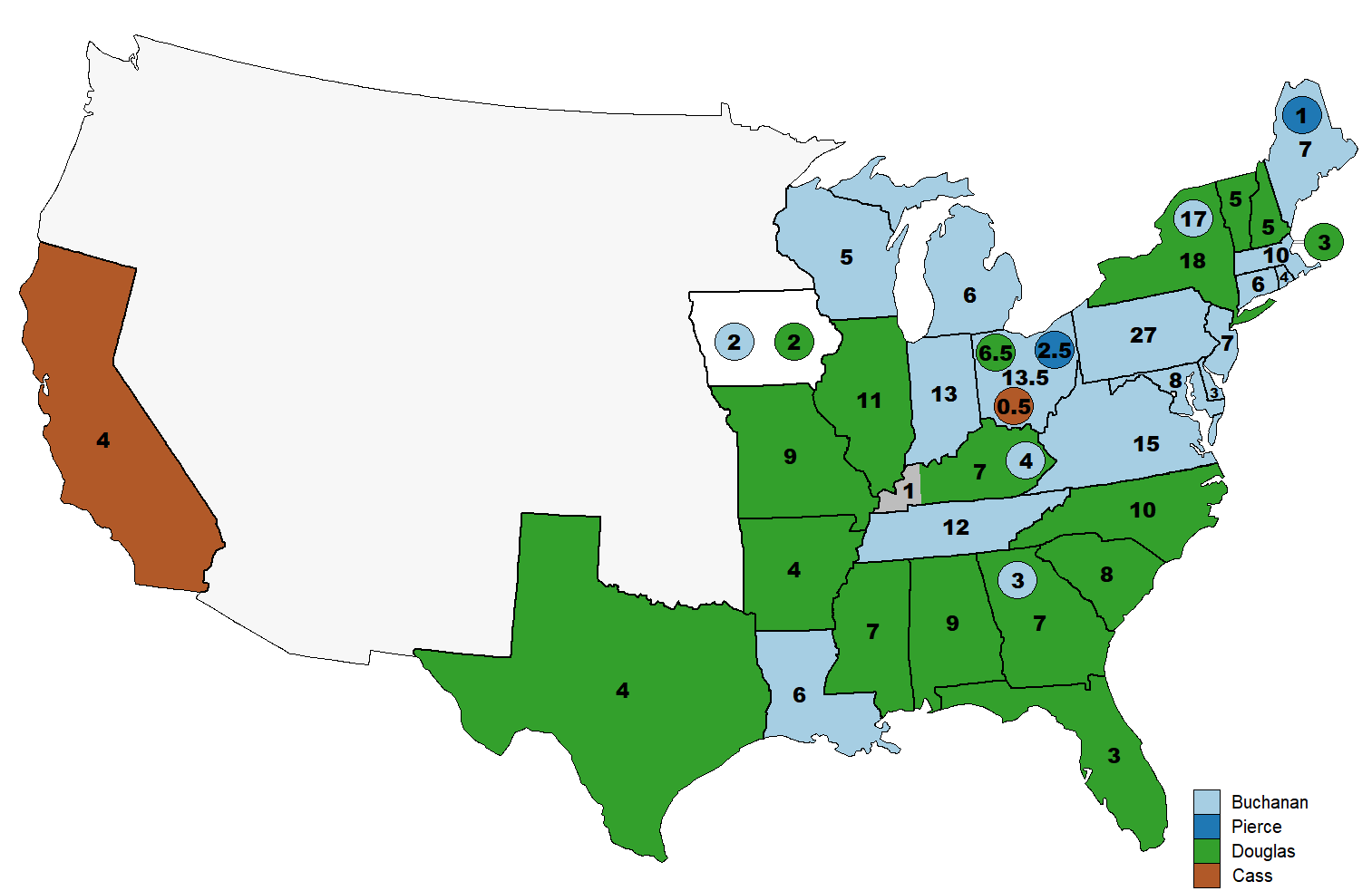
15th Presidential Ballot

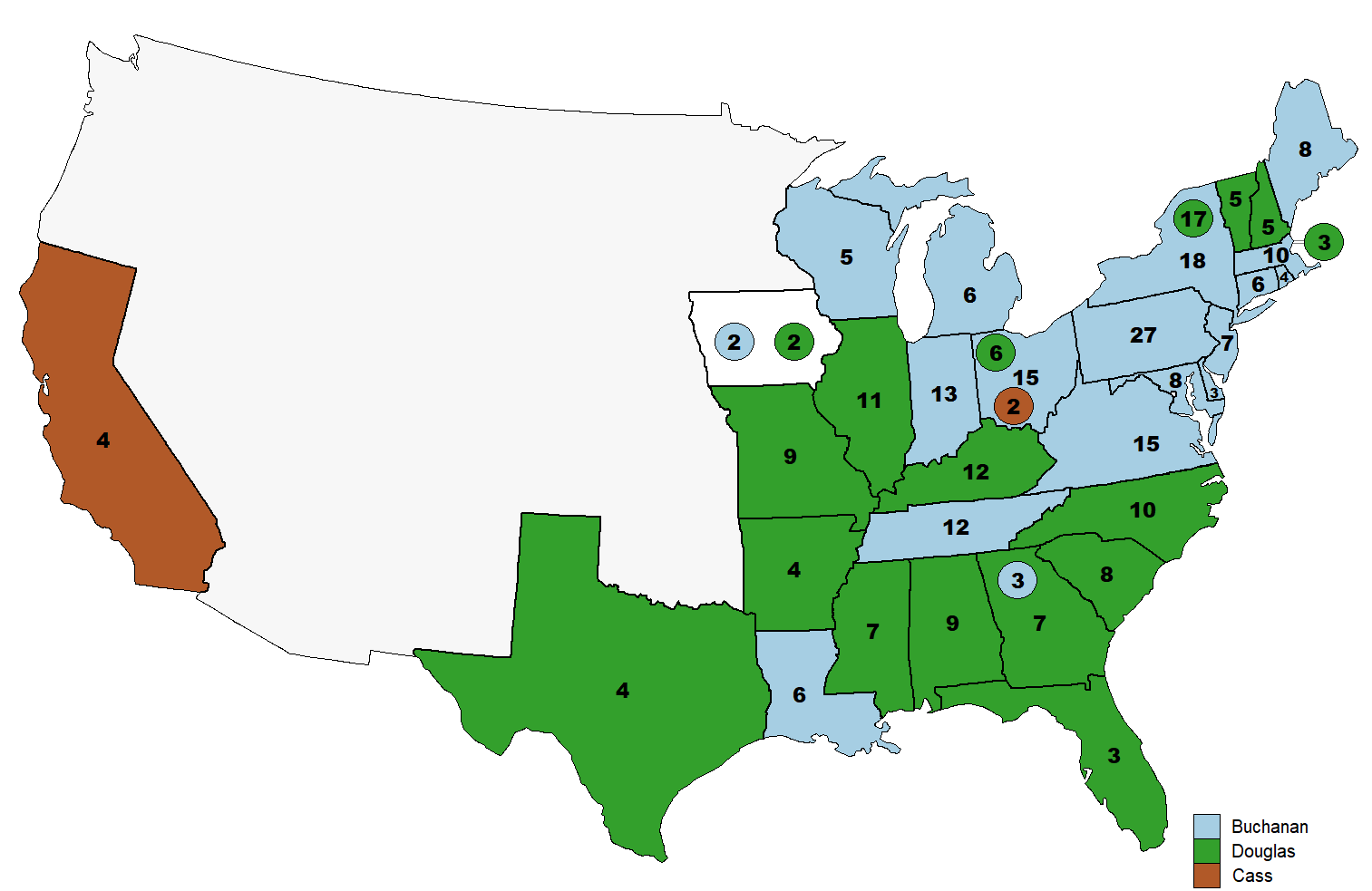
16th Presidential Ballot

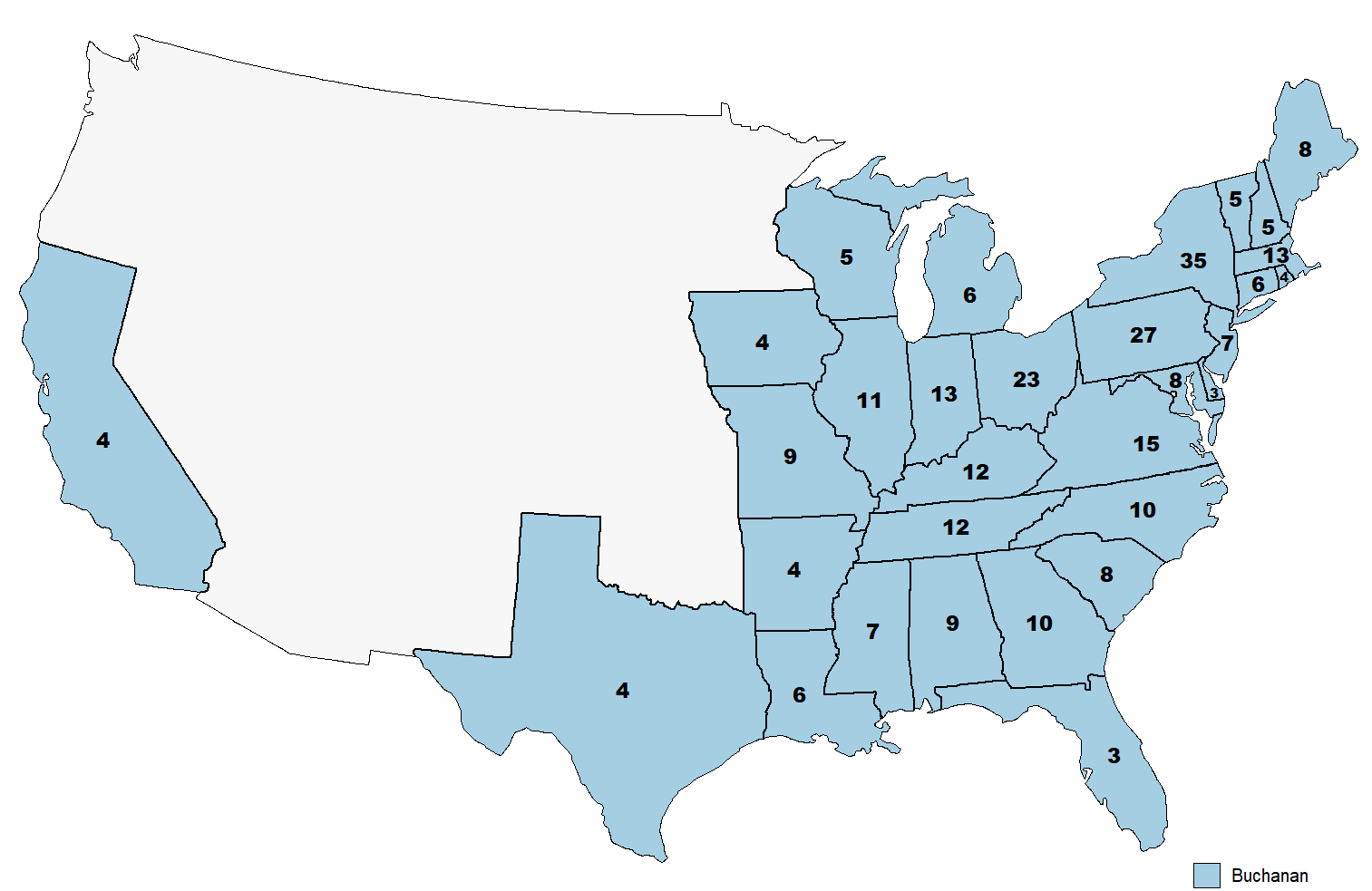
17th Presidential Ballot

== Vice Presidential nomination ==
=== Vice Presidential candidates ===
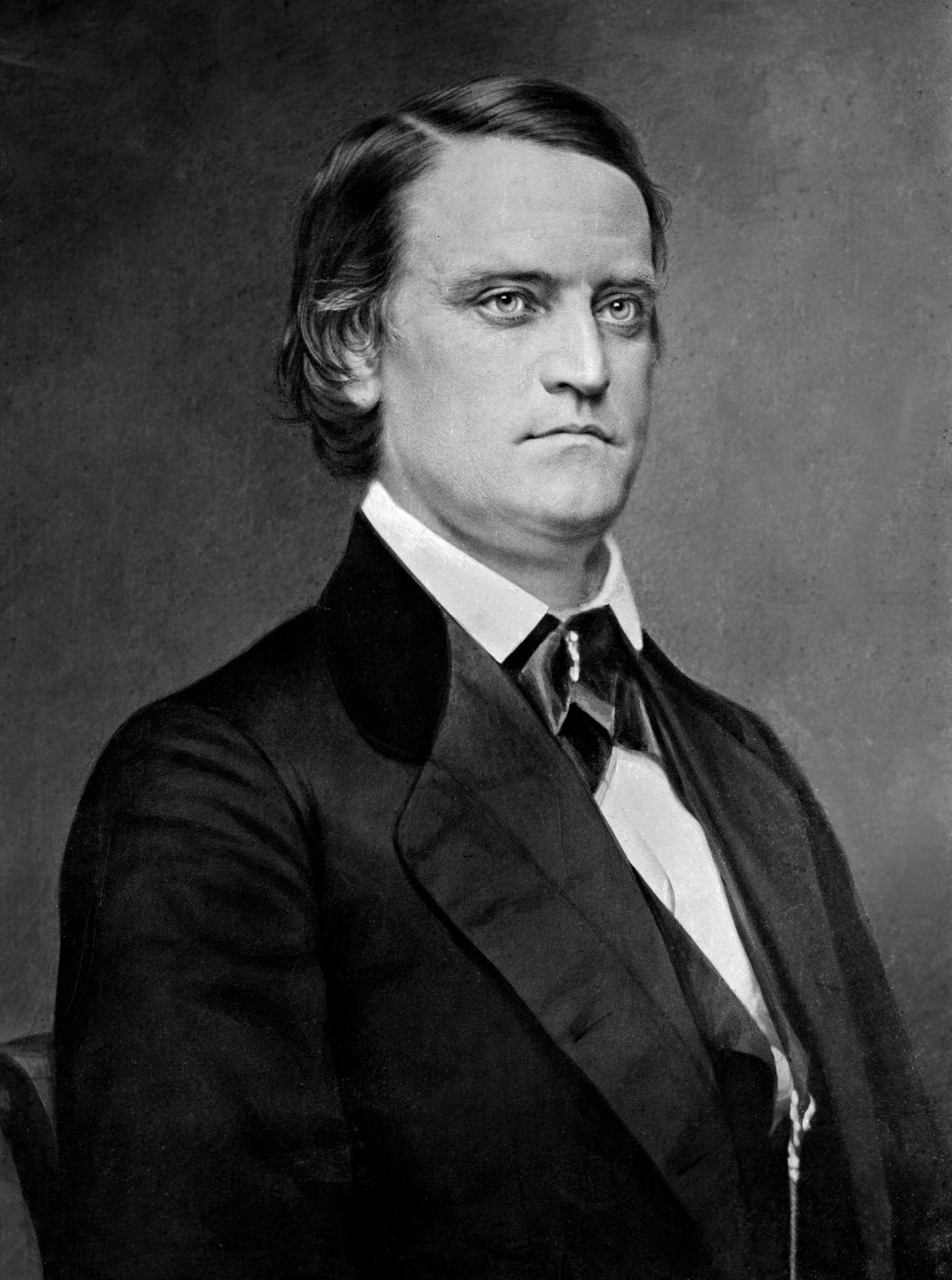
Former Representative
John C. Breckinridge
of Kentucky

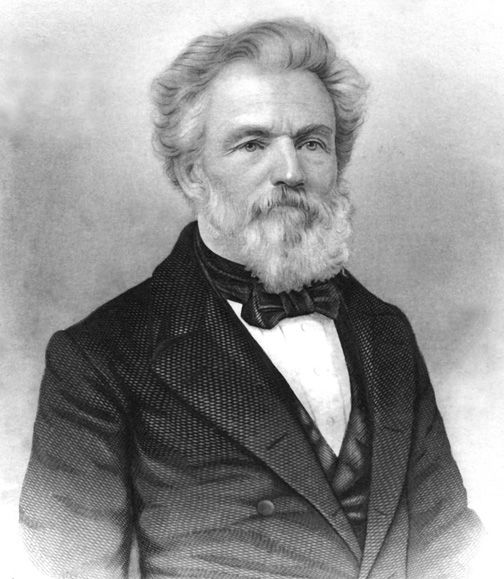
Representative
John A. Quitman
of Mississippi

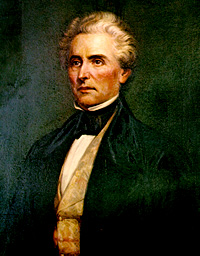
Former Representative
Linn Boyd
of Kentucky

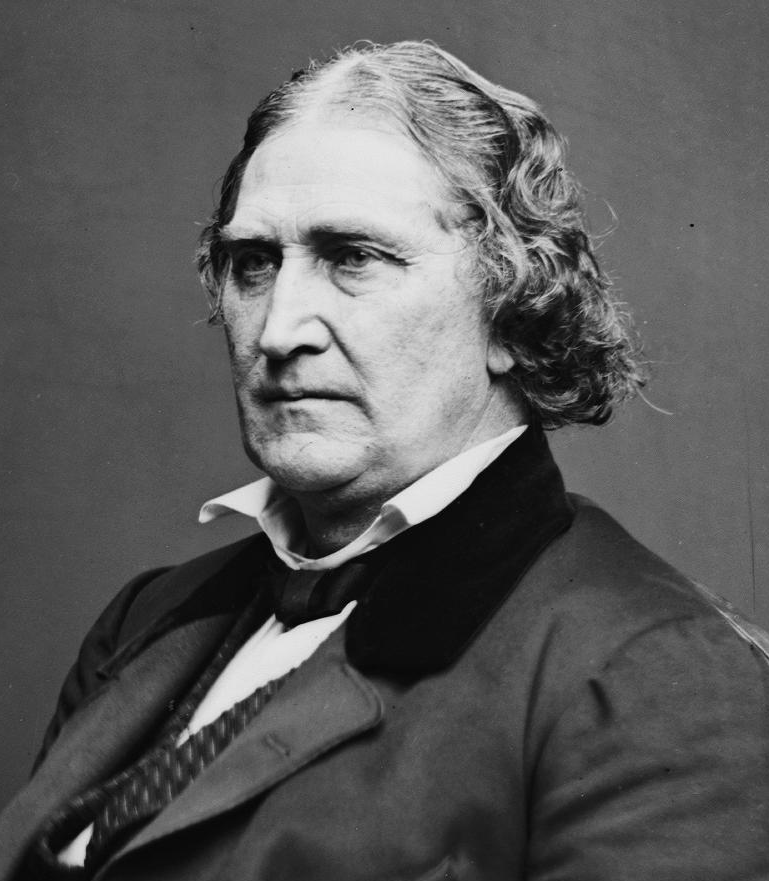
Senator
James A. Bayard
of Delaware

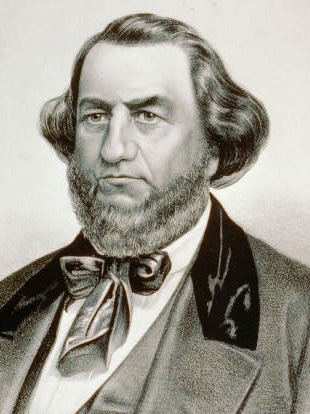
Governor
Herschel V. Johnson
of Georgia

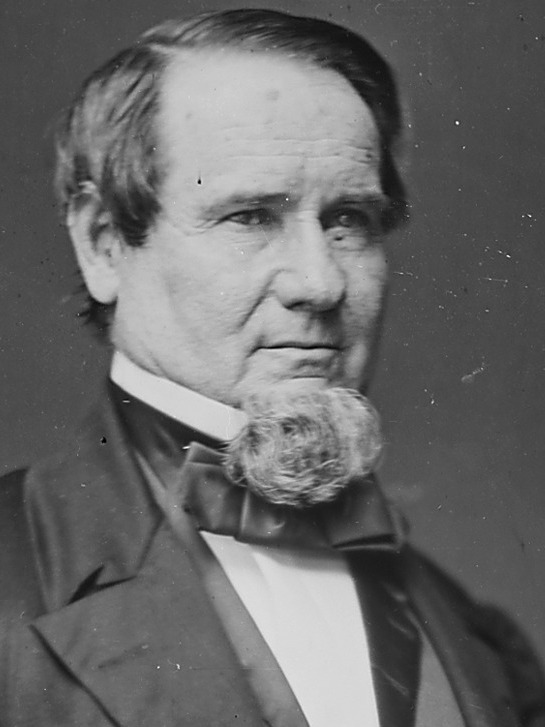
Former Governor
Aaron V. Brown
of Tennessee

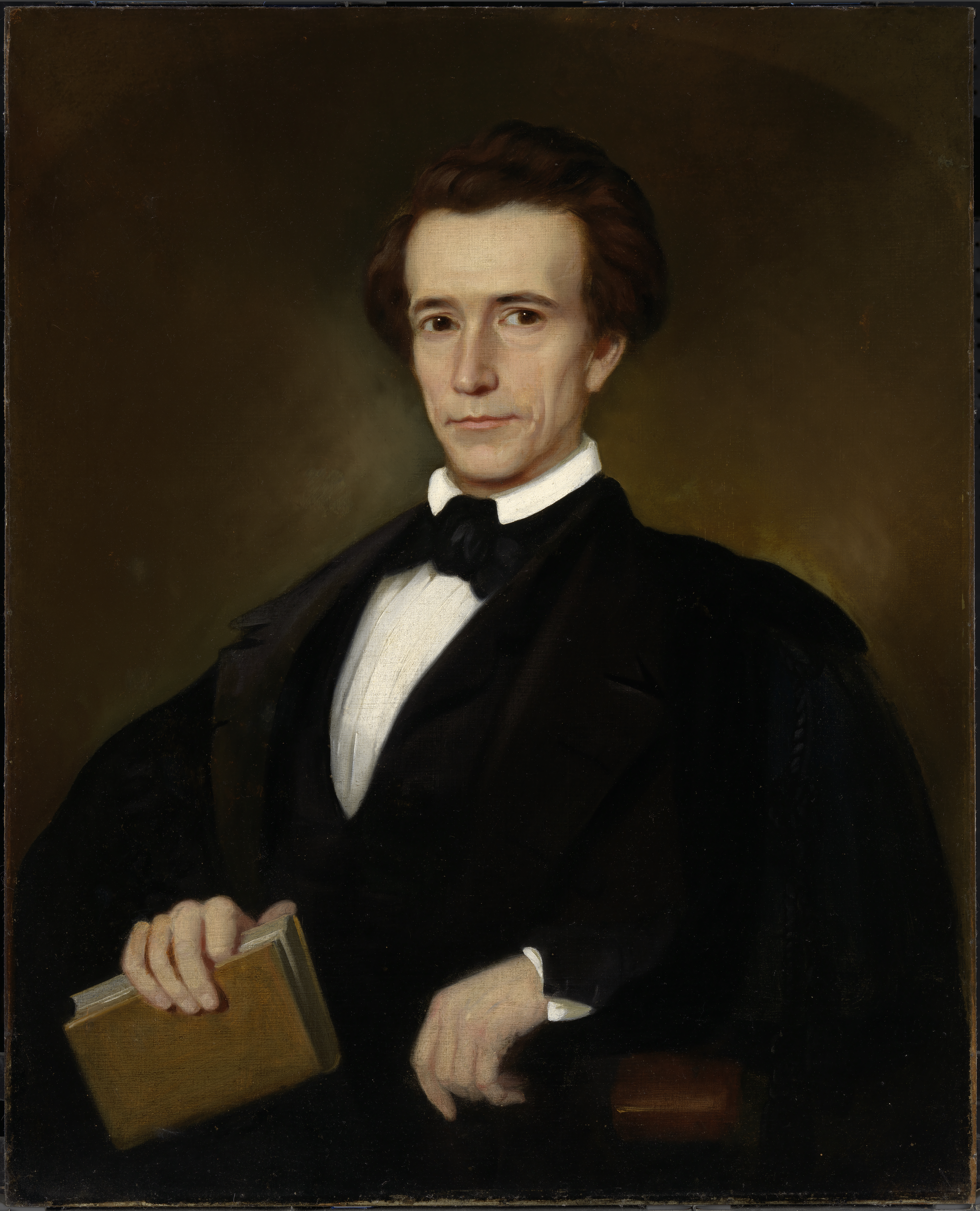
Secretary of the Navy
James C. Dobbin
of North Carolina

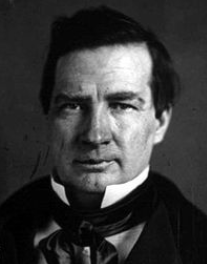
Senator
Thomas J. Rusk
of Texas

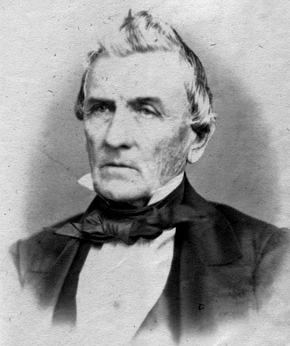
Senator
Benjamin Fitzpatrick
of Alabama

=== Declined ===
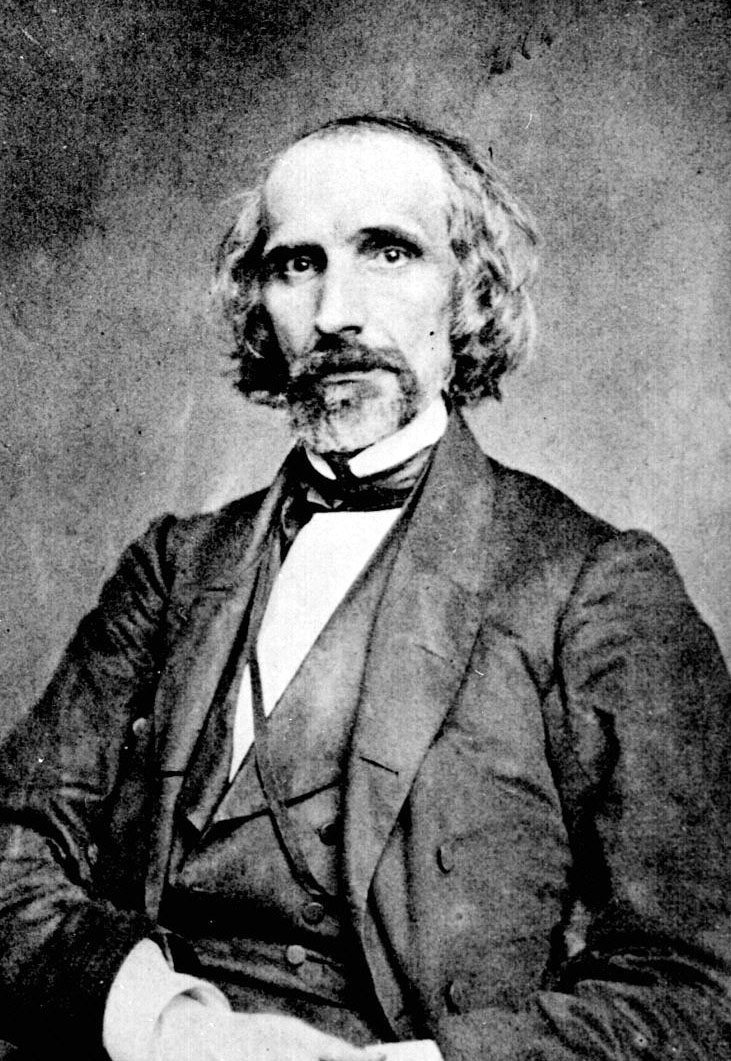
Former Representative
James Seddon
of Virginia

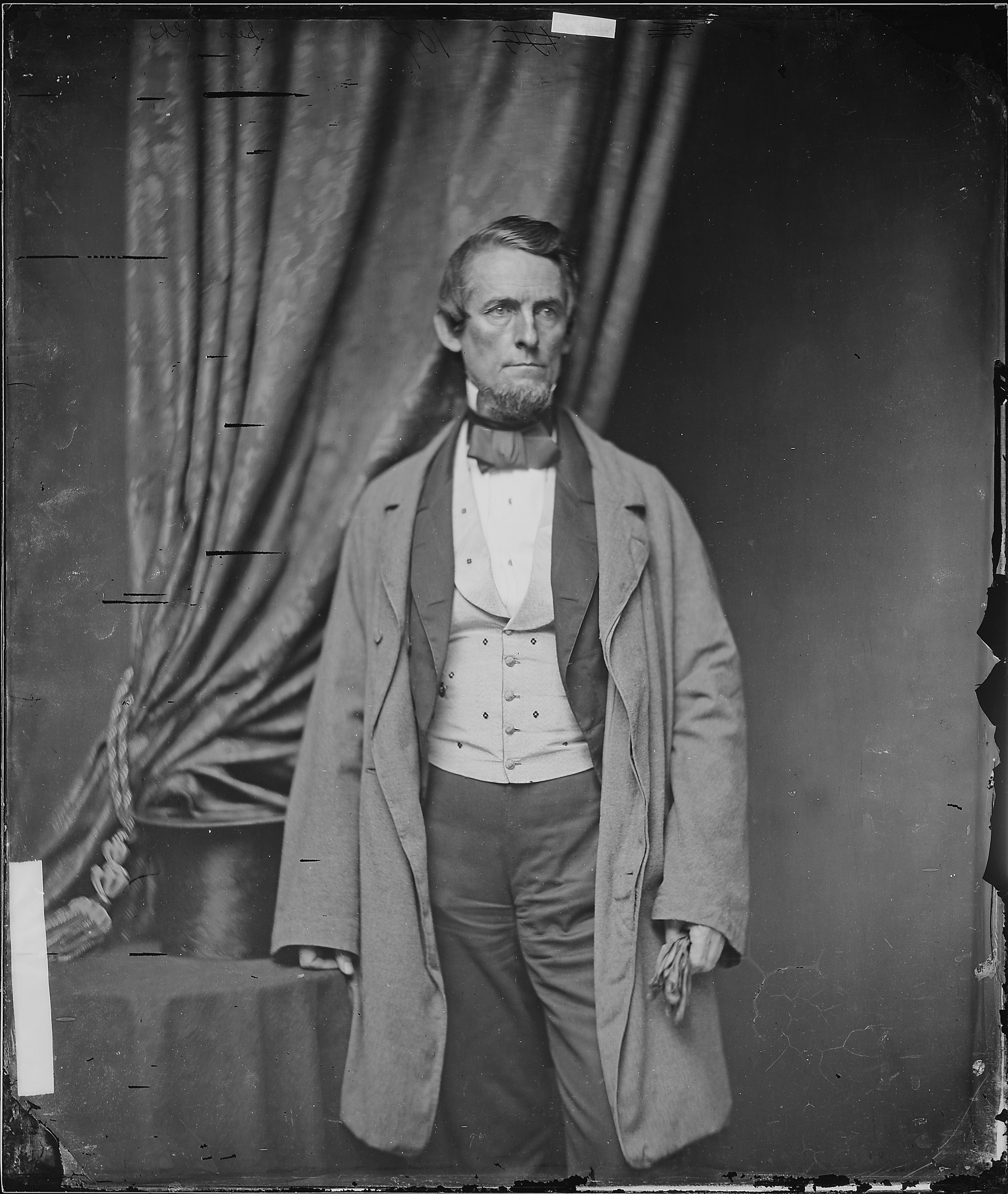
Gubernatorial Nominee
Trusten Polk
of Missouri

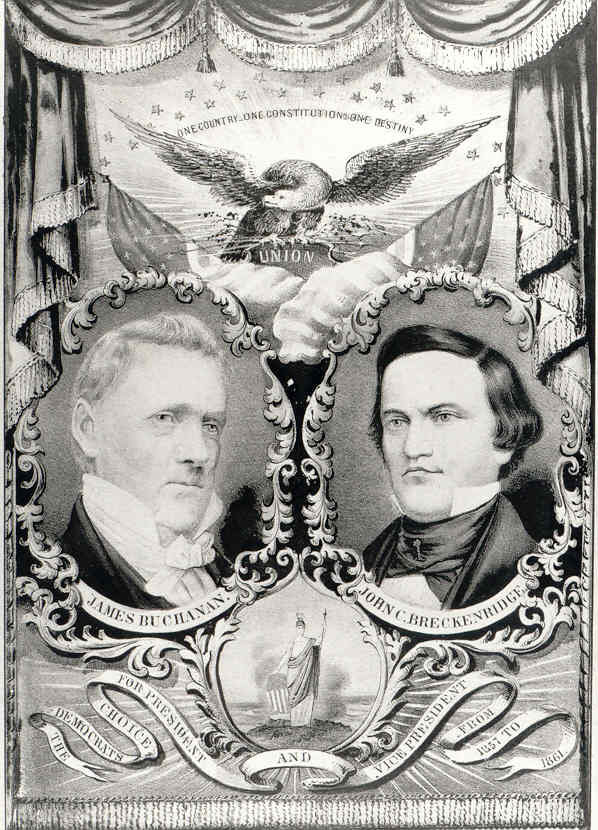
Buchanan/Breckinridge campaign poster

Eleven candidates were nominated for the vice presidency, but a number of them attempted to withdraw themselves from consideration, among them the eventual nominee, John C. Breckinridge of Kentucky. Breckinridge supported fellow Kentuckian Linn Boyd for the vice presidential nomination. On the first ballot, Representative John A. Quitman of Mississippi was the front-runner, but his extreme pro-slavery views meant he no real prospect of gaining the required two-thirds majority. Following a draft effort led by the delegation from Vermont, Breckinridge was nominated unanimously on the second ballot. As Vermont's David Allen Smalley stated, "No Democrat has a right to refuse his services when his country calls."

Vice Presidential Ballot
	1st (Before Shifts)	1st (After Shifts)	2nd (After Shifts)
Quitman	60	59	0
Breckinridge	37	50	296
Boyd	33	33	0
Bayard	31	31	0
Johnson	31	31	0
Brown	29	29	0
Butler	27	27	0
Dobbin	15	13	0
Rusk	15	7	0
Fitzpatrick	13	11	0
Polk	5	5	0

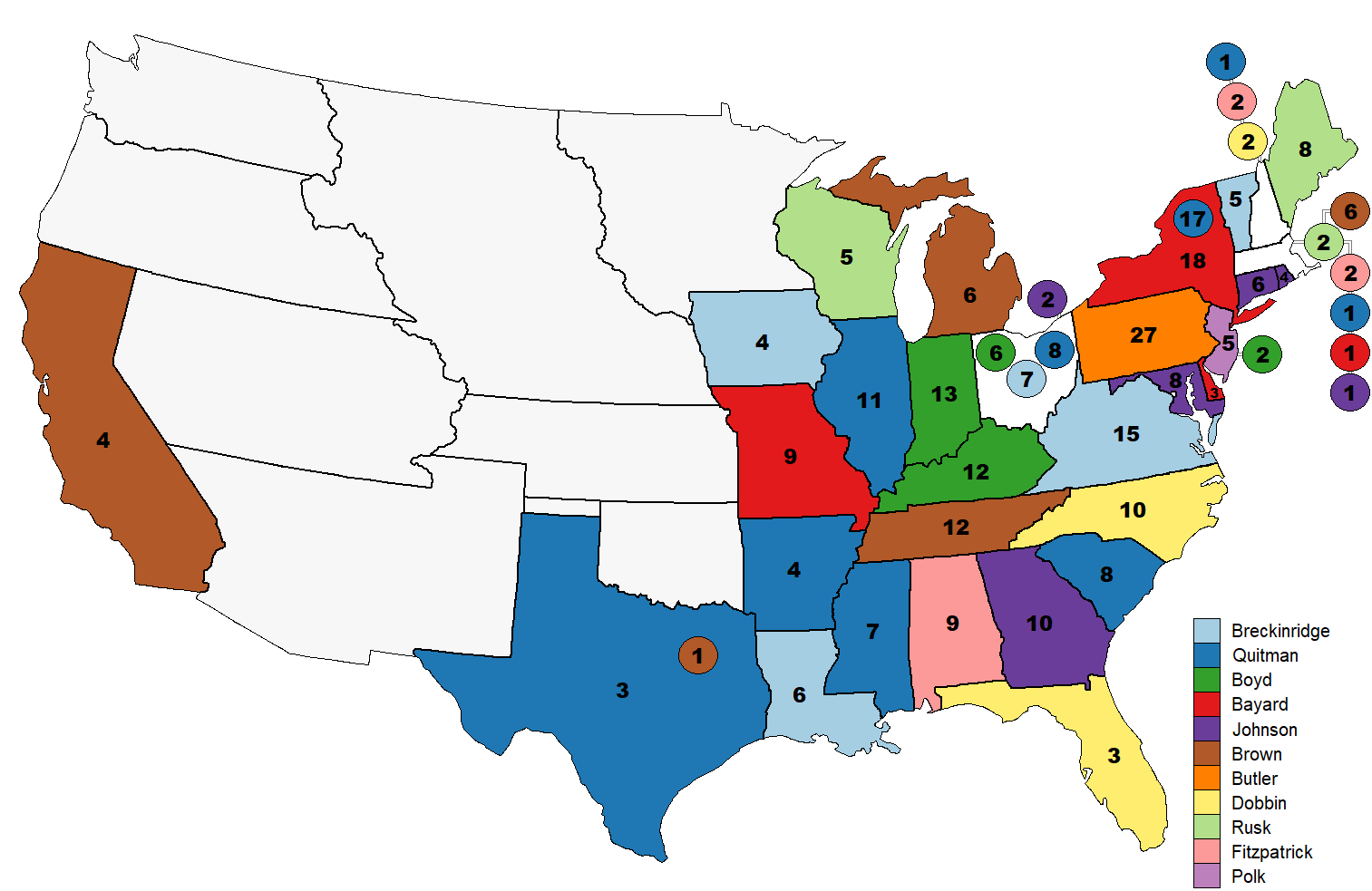
1st Ballot
(Before Shifts)

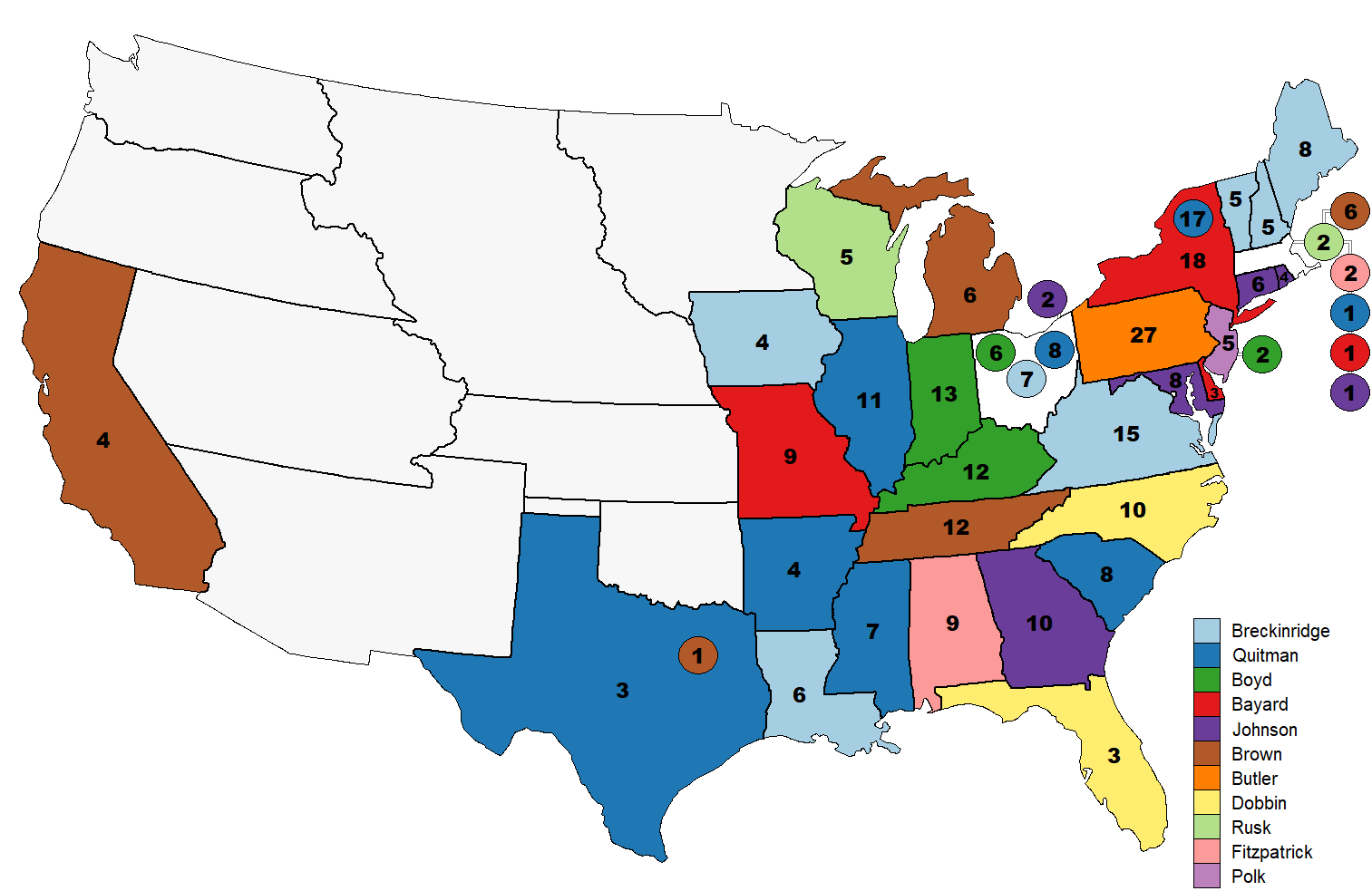
1st Ballot
(After Shifts)

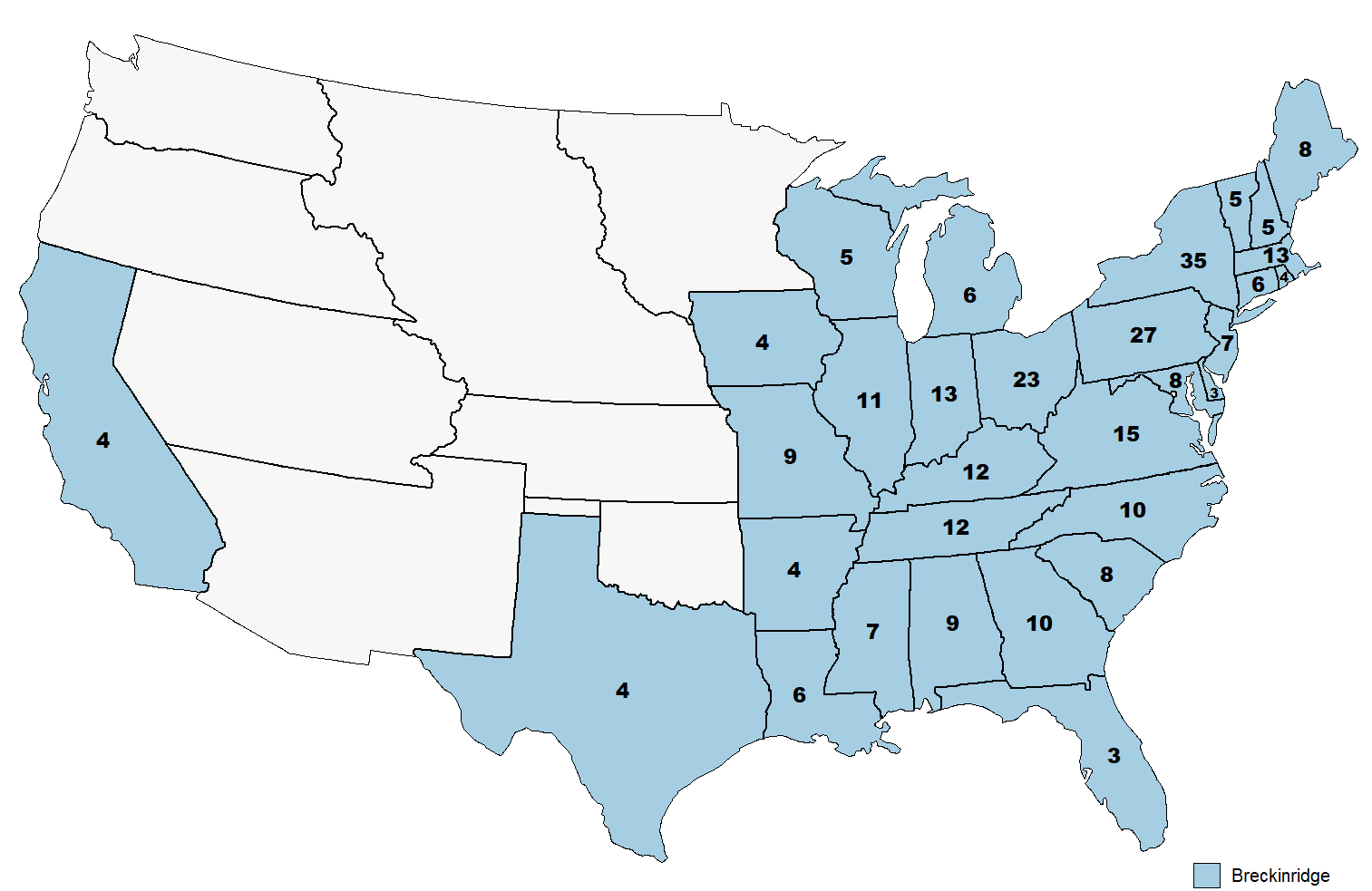
2nd Ballot
(After Shifts)

== Aftermath ==
The Buchanan-Breckinridge ticket went on to win the 1856 presidential election, defeating John C. Frémont with William L. Dayton from the new Republican Party, and a strong third party showing from the American Party of the "Know Nothings" represented by former President Millard Fillmore and Andrew J. Donelson.

== See also ==
- History of the United States Democratic Party
- 1856 Republican National Convention
- 1856 Whig National Convention
- List of Democratic National Conventions
- U.S. presidential nomination convention
- 1856 United States presidential election

Preceded by 1852; Baltimore, Maryland	Democratic National Conventions	Succeeded by 1860; Baltimore, Maryland
