= Wadesboro, Kentucky =

Unincorporated community in Kentucky, United States

- Unincorporated community
- Location within the state of Kentucky Wadesboro (the United States)
- Coordinates: 36°44′53″N 88°19′17″W
- Country: United States
- State: Kentucky
- County: Calloway
- Elevation: 463 ft (141 m)
- Time zone: UTC-6 (Central (CST))
  - Summer (DST): UTC-5 (CST)
- GNIS feature ID: 509298

Wadesboro or Waidsboro is an unincorporated community in Calloway County, Kentucky, United States.

== History ==
The first settlement in Calloway County was likely made near Wadesboro in 1818. Wadesboro served as the first county seat.
