= Linn Boyd =

American politician (1800–1859)

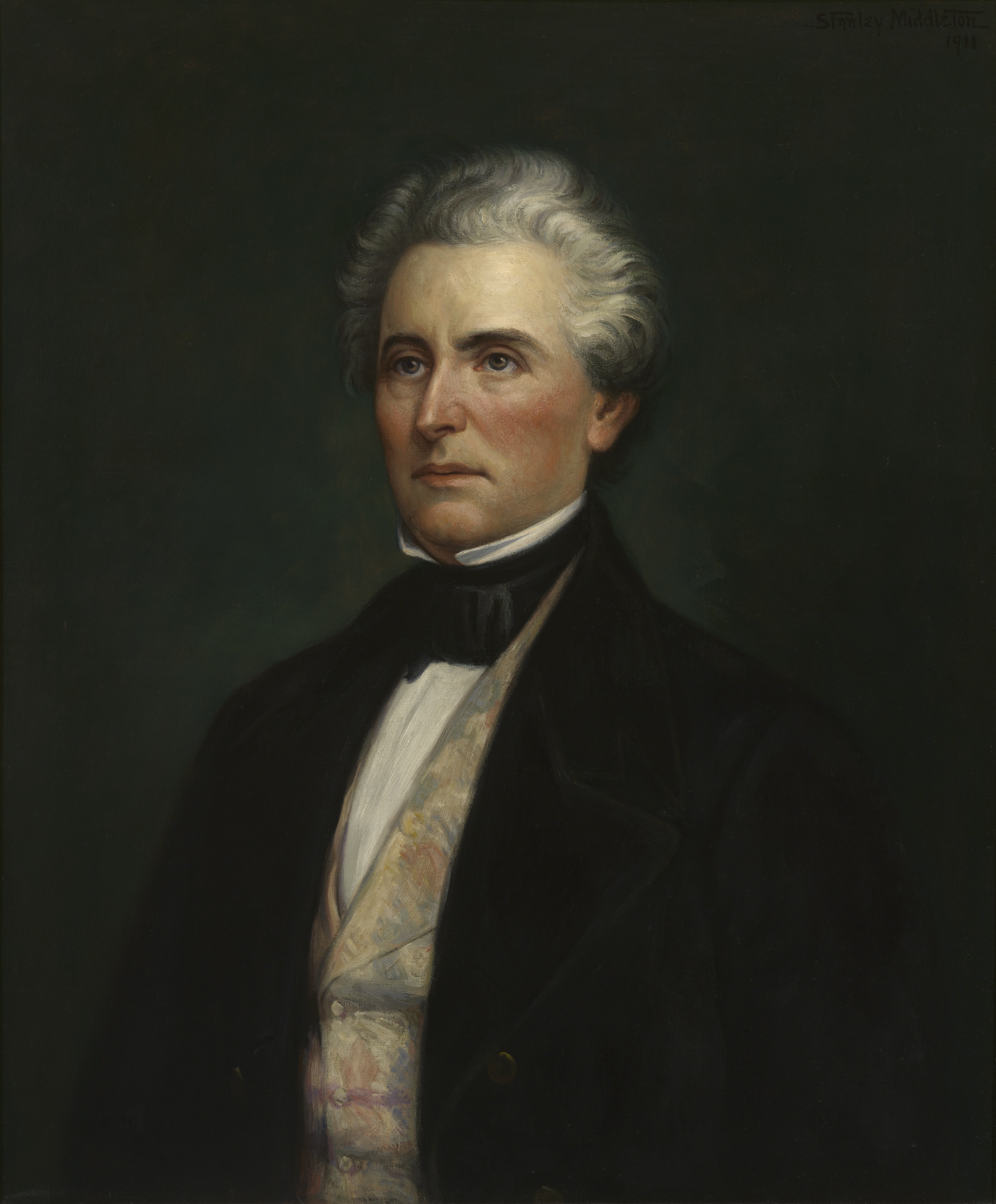

20th Speaker of the United States House of Representatives
- In office December 1, 1851 – March 3, 1855
- Preceded by: Howell Cobb
- Succeeded by: Nathaniel P. Banks

Leader of the House Democratic Caucus
- In office December 1, 1851 – March 3, 1855
- Preceded by: Howell Cobb
- Succeeded by: James Lawrence Orr

Member of the U.S. House of Representatives from Kentucky's 1st district
- In office March 4, 1839 – March 3, 1855
- Preceded by: John L. Murray
- Succeeded by: Henry C. Burnett
- In office March 4, 1835 – March 3, 1837
- Preceded by: Chittenden Lyon
- Succeeded by: John L. Murray

17th Lieutenant Governor of Kentucky
- In office August 30, 1859 – December 17, 1859
- Governor: Beriah Magoffin
- Preceded by: James G. Hardy
- Succeeded by: Richard T. Jacob

Member of the Kentucky House of Representatives
- In office 1827; 1831

Personal details
- Born: November 22, 1800 Nashville, Tennessee, U.S.
- Died: December 17, 1859 (aged 59) Paducah, Kentucky, U.S.
- Party: Jacksonian; Democratic
- Spouse(s): Alice Bennett; Anna (Rhey) Dixon
- Relations: Abraham Boyd (Father); Elizabeth Linn Boyd (Mother)
- Children: Butler Boyd; Linn Boyd Jr. Felix Boyd; Rhey Boyd
- Profession: Politician; Farmer

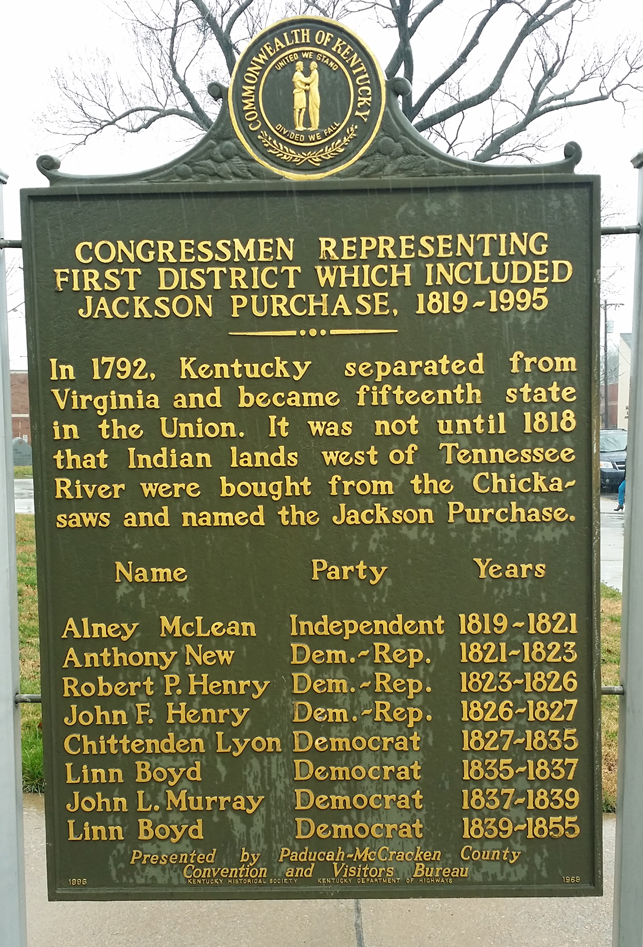
Sign in front of the McCracken, Kentucky Courthouse (in Paducah, Kentucky) commemorating early members of the U.S. House of Representatives representing Jackson Purchase (U.S. historical region). The "First District" in the title actually changed over time. It refers to the Jackson Purchase, which was in the 5th district from 1819 to 1823, the 12th district until 1833, and then the 1st district until the end of the sign's lineage in 1855.

Linn Boyd (November 22, 1800 – December 17, 1859) (also spelled "Lynn") was a prominent US politician of the 1840s and 1850s, and served as Speaker of the United States House of Representatives from 1851 to 1855. Boyd was elected to the House as a Jacksonian from Kentucky from 1835 to 1837 and again as a Democrat from 1839 to 1855, serving seven terms in the House. Boyd County, Kentucky is named in his honor.

== Early and family life ==
Born to the wife of part-time delegate Abraham Boyd in Nashville, Tennessee, he was raised and educated to some minimal extent in Trigg County. In 1832, Boyd married Trigg County native Alice C. Bennett. In 1850, the widower married a widow from Pennsylvania, Anna L. Dixon.

== Early career ==
Boyd moved to Calloway County to farm in 1826. The next year he became Calloway County's delegate in the Kentucky House of Representatives, and served alongside his father (who represented Trigg County) in 1828–1829. In 1831 Boyd moved back to Trigg County and its voters elected him to represent them in the state House.

== U.S. Congressman ==
In 1833, Boyd lost his first campaign for the United States House of Representatives. In 1835 he was elected to the House and served there until 1837, when a Whig landslide resulting from the Panic of 1837 cost him his seat.

Kentucky voters of the First Congressional District soon returned Boyd to the House, and he would serve from 1839 through 1855. He was a strong supporter of President Andrew Jackson. Boyd played a key role in maneuvering the annexation of Texas through Congress during the term of President John Tyler in 1845. Boyd was also important in getting the Compromise of 1850, chiefly credited to Henry Clay, passed through Congress. Largely though his prominence in shepherding the compromise to passage, Boyd was elected Speaker of the House in 1851 and held that office until 1855.

While in the House, he sufficiently impressed his colleague Charles S. Benton that he named his son, the future inventor and businessman Linn Boyd Benton, after him.

== Later career ==
While still in Congress, Boyd declined a nomination for Governor of Kentucky in 1848 and was replaced by Lazarus W. Powell. In 1852, he moved to Paducah.

After leaving the House, he was mentioned as a candidate for Vice President of the United States at the 1856 Democratic National Convention but was never officially nominated; the eventual nominee was fellow Kentuckian John C. Breckinridge.

Kentucky voters elected Boyd the 17th Lieutenant Governor of Kentucky in 1859, but he died after less than four months in office. This became significant with the onset of the Civil War. Governor Beriah Magoffin, who supported slavery, secession, and states' rights, became increasingly unpopular and distrusted as he sought to keep Kentucky on a neutral course between the Union and the Confederate States of America. Unionists held a two-thirds majority in both houses of the Kentucky General Assembly in the summer of 1861 and frequently overrode Magoffin's vetoes. By August 1862, Magoffin made it clear that he was willing to resign the governorship. However, due to Linn Boyd's death, the person next in line to become Governor of Kentucky was Speaker of the Senate John F. Fisk, whom Magoffin thought unacceptable. After Fisk resigned as Speaker and was replaced by James F. Robinson, Magoffin resigned. Thus, Robinson became governor, and Fisk was reinstalled as Speaker of the Senate.

== Death and burial ==
Boyd died in Paducah on December 17, 1859. He was buried at Paducah's Oak Grove Cemetery. Oaklands, a spacious brick come he had built in Paducah in 1852, no longer exists except as a street name.

U.S. House of Representatives
Preceded by Chittenden Lyon	Member of the U.S. House of Representatives from Kentucky's 1st congressional district March 4, 1835 – March 3, 1837	Succeeded by John L. Murray
Preceded by John L. Murray	Member of the U.S. House of Representatives from Kentucky's 1st congressional district March 4, 1839 – March 3, 1855	Succeeded by Henry C. Burnett
Political offices
Preceded by Howell Cobb	Speaker of the U.S. House of Representatives; December 1, 1851 – March 3, 1853; December 5, 1853 – March 3, 1855	Succeeded by Nathaniel P. Banks
Preceded by James G. Hardy	Lieutenant Governor of Kentucky; 1859	Succeeded by Richard Taylor Jacob
