= Linn Laupsa =

Norwegian politician

Linn Laupsa (born 13 August 1977) is a Norwegian politician for the Socialist Left Party.

She served as a deputy representative to the Norwegian Parliament from Østfold during the terms 2001–2005 and 2005–2009.

She has been a member of Halden municipal council.
