= Linn Stalsberg =

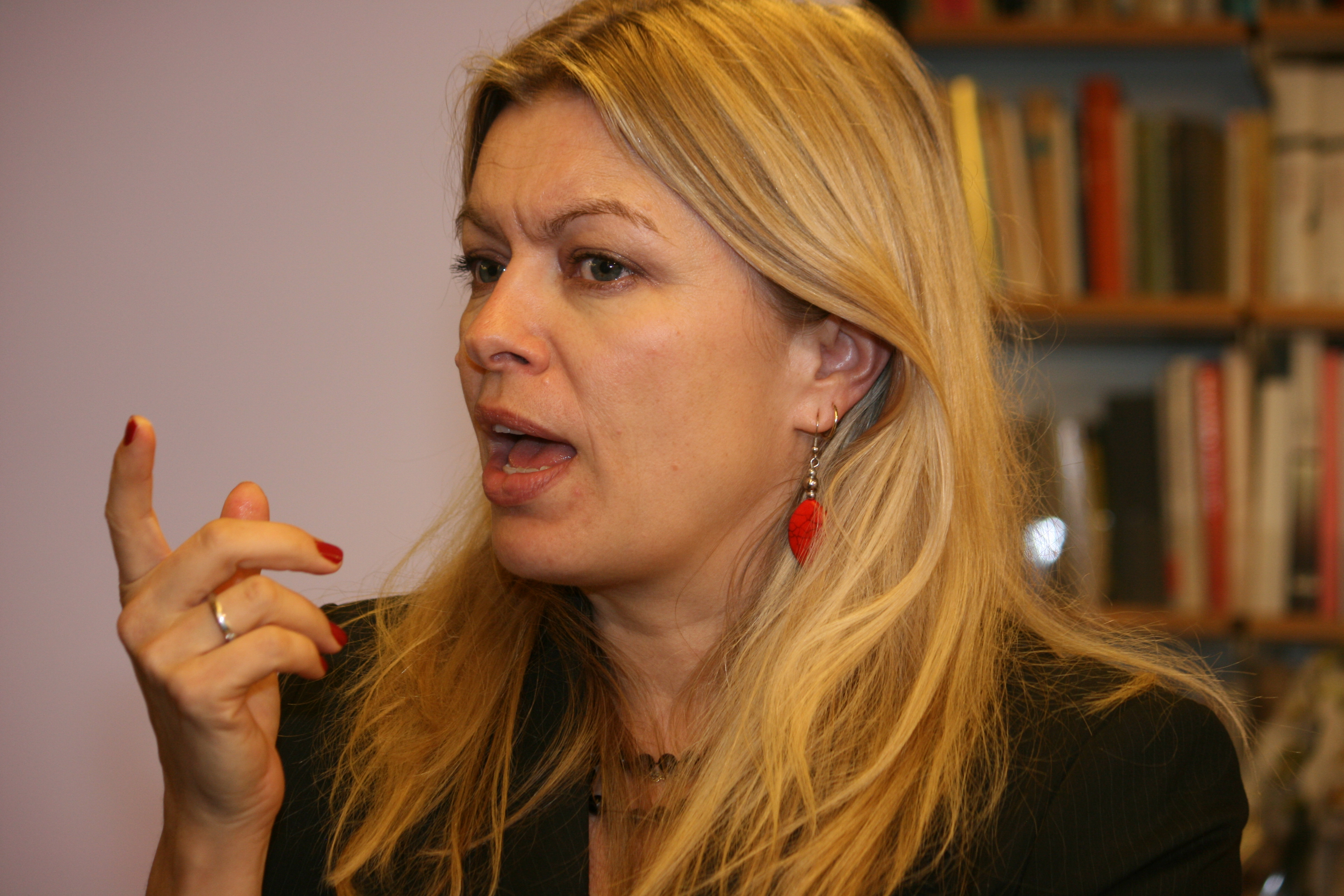
Linn Stalsberg

Linn Stalsberg (born 24 September 1971) is a Norwegian journalist, columnist, public debater and author.

She has worked as a journalist for Verdens Gang, Dagbladet, NRK, Klassekampen and Amnesty Norway. She is currently a freelance writer and author, and writes a column for Klassekampen. She has an MSc in sociology from the London School of Economics.

In her 2013 book Er jeg fri nå? Tidsklemme i verdens beste land, published by Aschehoug, she discusses women's dilemma of career versus family.

== Books ==
- Vill valuta - en debattbok om Tobinskatten (2002). Editor with Nina Drange
- Fanget i gjeldsfella -en debattbok om u-landsgjelda (2004). Editor.
- Krigens regler. En lærebok for Røde Kors. (2010). Co-author.
- Er jeg fri nå? Tidsklemme i verdens beste land (2013). Aschehoug. ISBN 9788203293597
- Det er nok nå (2019). Manifest.
