= 1965–66 Huddersfield Town A.F.C. season =

Huddersfield Town
1965–66 season
- Chairman: Roger B. Kaye
- Manager: Tom Johnston
- Stadium: Leeds Road
- Football League Second Division: 4th
- FA Cup: Fifth round (eliminated by Sheffield Wednesday)
- Football League Cup: Third round (eliminated by Preston North End)
- Top goalscorer: League: Allan Gilliver (18); All: Allan Gilliver (18)
- Highest home attendance: 49,514 vs Sheffield Wednesday (5 March 1966)
- Lowest home attendance: 9,774 vs Preston North End (13 October 1965)
- Biggest win: 6–0 vs Middlesbrough (28 August 1965)
- Biggest defeat: 1–4 vs Derby County (16 April 1966)

Huddersfield Town's 1965–66 campaign was a fairly successful season for the Town. For a large amount of the season, Town were on the verge on promotion to Division 1. Town also managed to reach the 5th round of the FA Cup, before losing to Sheffield Wednesday. Town finished in 4th place, but a win in the final game against Coventry City, might have given the team promotion, but a 2–0 defeat left the door open for Southampton.

== Squad at the start of the season ==
Note: Flags indicate national team as defined under FIFA eligibility rules; some limited exceptions apply. Players may hold more than one non-FIFA nationality.

Pos.	Nation	Player
GK	ENG	Peter Goy
GK	IRL	John Oldfield
DF	ENG	Denis Atkins
DF	ENG	Chris Cattlin
DF	ENG	John Coddington
DF	ENG	David Joy
DF	ENG	Billy Legg
DF	ENG	Bob McNab
DF	IRL	Mick Meagan
MF	ENG	Peter Dinsdale
MF	ENG	Billy Lynn

Pos.	Nation	Player
MF	ENG	Kevin McHale
MF	NIR	Jimmy Nicholson
MF	ENG	Michael O'Grady
MF	SCO	Johnny Quigley
MF	ENG	Steve Smith
MF	ENG	Ray Veall
FW	ENG	Allan Gilliver
FW	ENG	Tony Leighton
FW	SCO	Les Massie
FW	ENG	John Rudge
FW	ENG	Derek Stokes

== Review ==
Tom Johnston began his first full season in charge of Huddersfield Town in glorious mood. They won their first 3 games, which included a 6–0 win over Middlesbrough, where both Allan Gilliver and Les Massie scored hat-tricks. Gilliver actually scored 7 goals in his first 4 league games, which would lead him to a transfer to Blackburn Rovers at the end of the season. By Christmas, Town were at the summit of the 2nd Division, but a little drop in form saw them slowly go down the table.

A nice run in the FA Cup saw Town reach the 5th round, before they narrowly lost to Sheffield Wednesday. Town only won 2 of their last 10 matches, which saw them miss out on promotion by just 3 points from Southampton. This would be the closest that Town would get to Division 1 until their promotion in the 1969–70 season.

== Squad at the end of the season ==
Note: Flags indicate national team as defined under FIFA eligibility rules; some limited exceptions apply. Players may hold more than one non-FIFA nationality.

Pos.	Nation	Player
GK	ENG	Peter Goy
GK	IRL	John Oldfield
DF	ENG	Denis Atkins
DF	ENG	Chris Cattlin
DF	ENG	John Coddington
DF	ENG	David Joy
DF	ENG	Billy Legg
DF	ENG	Bob McNab
DF	IRL	Mick Meagan
MF	ENG	Peter Dinsdale
MF	ENG	Billy Lynn

Pos.	Nation	Player
MF	ENG	Kevin McHale
MF	NIR	Jimmy Nicholson
MF	SCO	Johnny Quigley
MF	ENG	Steve Smith
MF	ENG	Ray Veall
FW	ENG	Allan Gilliver
FW	ENG	Tony Leighton
FW	SCO	Les Massie
FW	ENG	John Rudge
FW	ENG	Don Weston

== Results ==
=== Division Two ===
Date	Opponents	Home/ Away	Result F–A	Scorers	Attendance	Position
21 August 1965	Leyton Orient	A	2–0	Gilliver, Nicholson	7,381	1st
24 August 1965	Ipswich Town	H	1–0	Gilliver	11,448	1st
28 August 1965	Middlesbrough	H	6–0	Gilliver (3), Massie (3)	14,772	1st
31 August 1965	Ipswich Town	A	2–2	Gilliver (2)	14,283	1st
4 September 1965	Bristol City	A	1–2	Nicholson	15,708	2nd
7 September 1965	Bolton Wanderers	H	1–0	McHale	24,532	1st
11 September 1965	Crystal Palace	A	1–2	O'Grady	16,684	4th
15 September 1965	Bolton Wanderers	A	1–1	Leighton	16,614	3rd
18 September 1965	Preston North End	H	2–1	Leighton (2)	18,114	2nd
25 September 1965	Charlton Athletic	A	2–0	Massie, O'Grady	14,661	1st
2 October 1965	Plymouth Argyle	H	2–1	McHale, Leighton	16,707	1st
9 October 1965	Manchester City	H	0–0		31,876	1st
16 October 1965	Rotherham United	A	0–0		16,939	1st
23 October 1965	Wolverhampton Wanderers	H	1–1	Leighton	19,122	1st
30 October 1965	Norwich City	A	1–1	Leighton	16,442	3rd
6 November 1965	Bury	H	2–0	Quigley, Weston	17,212	1st
13 November 1965	Southampton	A	1–0	Nicholson	21,660	1st
20 November 1965	Derby County	H	1–3	Weston	14,336	2nd
27 November 1965	Cardiff City	A	1–0	Smith	10,898	1st
4 December 1965	Carlisle United	H	2–0	Leighton (2 pens)	15,517	1st
11 December 1965	Coventry City	A	3–0	Nicholson, Gilliver, McHale	27,735	1st
18 December 1965	Rotherham United	H	4–0	McHale, Gilliver (2), Leighton (pen)	17,855	1st
28 December 1965	Birmingham City	A	1–2	Leighton	19,750	1st
1 January 1966	Manchester City	A	0–2		47,171	1st
8 January 1966	Southampton	H	2–0	Gilliver (2)	17,989	1st
15 January 1966	Wolverhampton Wanderers	A	1–2	Weston	28,698	2nd
29 January 1966	Leyton Orient	H	1–1	Leighton	16,011	3rd
5 February 1966	Middlesbrough	A	3–1	Massie (3)	13,485	2nd
19 February 1966	Bristol City	H	3–0	Coddington (pen), Weston (2)	18,544	2nd
26 February 1966	Crystal Palace	H	1–1	Sewell (og)	17,350	2nd
12 March 1966	Preston North End	A	1–1	Gilliver	17,724	2nd
15 March 1966	Birmingham City	H	2–0	Gilliver (2)	19,156	1st
19 March 1966	Charlton Athletic	H	1–1	Gilliver	17,669	2nd
25 March 1966	Plymouth Argyle	A	0–0		13,902	1st
6 April 1966	Portsmouth	A	1–2	McHale	13,932	2nd
9 April 1966	Norwich City	H	0–0		13,942	2nd
11 April 1966	Portsmouth	H	2–0	Gilliver, Veall	18,479	1st
16 April 1966	Derby County	A	1–4	Massie	15,793	2nd
19 April 1966	Bury	A	4–0	McHale (2), Gilliver, Weston	12,783	1st
23 April 1966	Cardiff City	H	1–1	Carver (og)	19,138	1st
30 April 1966	Carlisle United	A	0–2		13,688	2nd
7 May 1966	Coventry City	H	0–2		24,997	4th

=== FA Cup ===
Date	Round	Opponents	Home/ Away	Result F–A	Scorers	Attendance
24 January 1966	Round 3	Hartlepools United	H	3–1	Quigley (2), Leighton	24,505
12 February 1966	Round 4	Plymouth Argyle	A	2–0	Smith, Massie	26,335
5 March 1966	Round 5	Sheffield Wednesday	H	1–2	Smith	49,514

=== Football League Cup ===
Date	Round	Opponents	Home/ Away	Result F–A	Scorers	Attendance
21 September 1965	Round 2	Bury	A	2–0	McHale, O'Grady	5,629
13 October 1965	Round 3	Preston North End	H	0–1		9,774

== Appearances and goals ==
Name	Nationality	Position	League		FA Cup		League Cup		Total	
Name	Nationality	Position	Apps	Goals	Apps	Goals	Apps	Goals	Apps	Goals
Denis Atkins	England	DF	42	0	3	0	2	0	47	0
Chris Cattlin	England	DF	0 (1)	0	0	0	0	0	0 (1)	0
John Coddington	England	DF	40	1	3	0	0	0	43	1
Peter Dinsdale	England	DF	14 (1)	0	2	0	2	0	18 (1)	0
Allan Gilliver	England	FW	27	18	1	0	0	0	28	18
David Joy	England	DF	1	0	0	0	0	0	1	0
Billy Legg	England	DF	1	0	0	0	0	0	1	0
Tony Leighton	England	FW	27	11	2	1	2	0	31	12
Billy Lynn	England	MF	3	0	0	0	0	0	3	0
Les Massie	Scotland	FW	22	8	2	1	1	0	25	9
Kevin McHale	England	MF	40	7	3	0	2	1	45	8
Bob McNab	England	DF	42	0	3	0	2	0	47	0
Mick Meagan	Republic of Ireland	DF	31 (1)	0	2	0	2	0	35 (1)	0
Jimmy Nicholson	Northern Ireland	MF	41	4	3	0	2	0	46	4
Michael O'Grady	England	MF	12	2	0	0	1	1	13	3
John Oldfield	Republic of Ireland	GK	42	0	3	0	2	0	47	0
Johnny Quigley	Scotland	MF	41	1	2	2	1	0	44	3
Steve Smith	England	MF	14 (3)	1	2	2	1	0	17 (3)	3
Derek Stokes	England	FW	0	0	0	0	2	0	2	0
Ray Veall	England	MF	11	1	1	0	0	0	12	1
Don Weston	England	FW	11 (2)	6	1	0	0	0	12 (2)	6
