= Lynn (surname) =

Lynn is a surname of Irish origin, English, Welsh or Scottish. It has a number of separate derivations:

- A locational surname from any of a number of places in England, the place name in turn may have derived from Brittonic lenna (pool or lake). Llyn means lake in modern Welsh.
- A locational surname in Scotland of Irish origin, the place name derived from Scottish Gaelic linne, in turn from Old Irish linn, meaning water feature or pool.
- A surname derived from a personal name in the north of Ireland, originally O'Fhloinn, later O'Loinn, O'Lynn and Lynn. See also the surnames Flynn and O'Flynn.

The earliest recorded instance of the surname is Aedricus de Lenna of King's Lynn, Norfolk, in 1177.

Notable people with the surname include:

== Arts and entertainment ==
- Allison Lynn (born 1971), American author
- Amber Lynn (born 1964), pornographic actress
- Ann Lynn (1933–2020), British actress
- Barbara Lynn (born 1943), American musician
- Betty Lynn (1926–2021), American actress
- Cheryl Lynn (born 1957), American musician
- Cynthia Lynn (1937–2014), Latvian actress
- Chelcie Lynn (born 1987), American influencer
- Diana Lynn (1926–1971), American actress
- Eleanor Lynn (1916–1996), American actress
- Elizabeth A. Lynn (born 1946), American author
- Emmett Lynn (1897–1958), American actor
- Frances Lynn, English journalist and author
- Ginger Lynn (born 1964), pornographic actress
- Henry Lynn (1895–1994), American director and screenwriter
- Jeffrey Lynn (1909–1995), American actor
- Jenny Lynn (photographer) (born 1953), American photographer
- Jonathan Lynn (born 1943), English actor and writer
- Lonnie Rashid Lynn Jr. (born 1972), American rapper known as Common
- Loretta Lynn (1932–2022), American country singer-songwriter
- Margaret E. Lynn (1924–2002), American theatre director
- Meredith Scott Lynn, American actress
- Porsche Lynn (born 1962), pornographic actress
- Ralph Lynn (1882–1962), British actor
- Robert Lynn (director) (1918–1982), British film and TV director
- Robert L. Lynn (1931–2020), American poet
- Sherry Lynn, American voice actress
- Tami Lynn (1942–2020), American musician
- Tanisha Lynn (born 1978), American actress
- Vera Lynn (1917–2020), British singer, the "forces' sweetheart" during WW2
- William Thynne Lynn (1835–1911), English author and astronomer

== Business and politics ==
- Bob Lynn (1933–2020), American politician
- Charlie Lynn (born 1945), Australian politician
- C. Stephen Lynn, American businessman
- Evelyn J. Lynn (born 1930), American politician
- Fred Lynn (1924–2012), American politician
- Gerry Lynn (politician) (1952–2020), American politician
- James Thomas Lynn (1927–2010), American political official
- John P. Lynn, American businessman
- Oliver Lynn (1926–1996), American talent manager and husband of Loretta Lynn
- Kathleen Lynn (1874–1955), Irish politician and doctor
- Laurence Lynn, Jr., American political scientist
- Robert Lynn (Australian politician) (1873–1928)
- Robert Lynn (Northern Ireland politician) (1873–1945), Ulster politician
- Uriel Lynn, Israeli politician
- Wauhope Lynn (1856–1920), Irish-American lawyer, judge, and politician

== Military ==
- Alan R. Lynn (fl. 1979–2018), U.S. Army lieutenant general
- John Lynn (VC) (1887–1915), English recipient of the Victoria Cross
- John A. Lynn, American military historian

== Sports ==
- Alex Lynn (born 1993), English racing driver
- Anthony Lynn (born 1968), American football player and coach
- Barry Lynn (darts player) (born 1987), English darts player
- Billy Lynn (1947–2014), English footballer
- Brandon Lynn (born 1995), American racing driver
- Byrd Lynn (1889–1940), American baseball player
- Chris Lynn (born 1990), Australian cricketer
- David Lynn (golfer) (born 1973), English golfer
- Fred Lynn (born 1952), American baseball player
- Gerry Lynn, Australian footballer
- Janet Lynn (born 1953), American figure skater
- Jenny Lynn, fitness and figure competitor
- Jerry Lynn (born 1963), American wrestler
- Jerry Lynn (baseball) (1916–1972), American baseball player
- Joe Lynn (1925–1992), English footballer
- Johnnie Lynn (born 1956), American football player
- Kendrick Lynn (born 1982), New Zealand rugby player
- Lance Lynn (born 1987), American baseball player
- Lonnie Lynn (1943–2014), American basketball player
- Mike Lynn (1936–2012), American football executive
- Mike Lynn (basketball) (born 1945), American basketball player
- Sammy Lynn (1920–1995), English footballer
- Shannon Lynn (born 1985), Canadian-born Scottish footballer
- Stan Lynn (1928–2002), English footballer
- Stevie Lynn, English wrestler
- Vic Lynn (1925–2010), Canadian ice hockey player

== Other ==
- Audra Lynn (born 1980), American model and Playboy Playmate of the Month
- Barry C. Lynn, American journalist and writer
- Barry W. Lynn (born 1948), American minister and activist
- Cassandra Lynn (born 1979), American model and Playboy Playmate of the Month
- David Lynn (architect) (1873–1961), American architect
- Donna Lynn (born 1936), American model and Playboy Playmate of the Month
- Greg Lynn (born 1964), American architect
- Nancy Lynn (c. 1956–2006), American aerobatic pilot
- Naomi B. Lynn (born 1933), American academic
- Peter Lynn (1946–2026), New Zealand kite maker, engineer and inventor
- Peter Lynn (statistician), British statistician and academic
- Regina Lynn (born 1971), American blogger
- Richard Lynn (1930–2023), British psychologist
- Robert J. Lynn (New Hampshire judge), justice of the New Hampshire Supreme Court
- Wiley Lynn (c. 1891–1932), American murderer
- William Henry Lynn (1829–1915), British architect

== See also ==
- Linn (surname)
- Lyn (surname)
- Lynne (surname)
