= Linn =

Linn may refer to:

== People ==
- Linn (surname)
- Linn (given name)
- Carl Linnaeus, abbreviated as Linn.
- Linn da Quebrada, stage name of Brazilian singer, actress, screenwriter and television personality Lina Pereira dos Santos (born 1990)

== Places ==
=== Germany ===
- Linn (Gangkofen), a part of Gangkofen in the Rottal-Inn district, Bavaria
- Linn (Massing), a part of Massing in the Rottal-Inn district, Bavaria
- Krefeld-Linn, a part of Krefeld in North Rhine-Westphalia

=== Scotland ===
- Linn (ward), an electoral ward in Glasgow
- Linn Park, Glasgow, a park on the outskirts of Glasgow

=== United States ===
- Linn, Kansas, a city
- Linn, Mississippi, an unincorporated community
- Linn, Missouri, a city
- Linn, Texas, an unincorporated area and census-designated place
- Linn, West Virginia
- Linn, Wisconsin, a town
- Linn County, Iowa
- Linn County, Kansas
- Linn County, Missouri
- Linn County, Oregon
- Mount Linn, California
- Linn Creek, Missouri, a city
- Linn Creek (Fox River tributary), Missouri
- Linn Lake, a lake in Minnesota
- Linn Park, Birmingham, Alabama, an urban park
- Linn Township (disambiguation)
- West Linn, a city in Oregon

=== Elsewhere ===
- Linn, Aargau, a former municipality in the Canton of Aargau, Switzerland
- Linn Mesa, Victoria Land, Antarctica

== Businesses ==
- Linn Energy, a defunct oil and gas company that operated in Western Oklahoma
- Linn Products, a Scottish audio electronics company
  - Linn Records, a record label, a division of Linn Products

== Other uses ==
- Linn (geology), in Scotland and northern England (Northumberland, Cumbria and Durham) a type of water feature, normally a Waterfall
- Linn tractor, a heavy duty civilian half-track or crawler tractor
- Linn LM-1, the first programmable digital drum machine
- Linn's Stamp News, a weekly newspaper for stamp collectors
- LINN, herbarium code for Linnaean Herbarium

== See also ==
- Lin (disambiguation)
- Lyn (disambiguation)
- Lynn (disambiguation)
