= Lynn =

Lynn may refer to:

== People and fictional characters ==
- Lynn (given name), including a list of people and fictional characters
- Lynn (surname)
- The Lynns, a 1990s American country music duo consisting of twin sisters Peggy and Patsy Lynn
- Lynn (voice actress), Japanese voice actress

== Places ==
=== Canada ===
- Lynn Lake, Manitoba, a town and adjacent lake
- Lynn, Nova Scotia, a community
- Lynn River, Ontario

=== Ireland ===
- Lynn (civil parish), County Westmeath

=== New Zealand ===
- New Lynn, a suburb of Auckland

=== United Kingdom ===
- King's Lynn, a port town in Norfolk, England
  - South Lynn, part of King's Lynn

=== United States ===
- Lynn, Alabama, a town
- Lynn, Arkansas, a town
- Lynn, Oakland, California, a former settlement
- Lynn, Indiana, a town
- Lynn, Massachusetts, a city
  - Lynn (MBTA station)
- Lynn, Nebraska, an unincorporated community
- Lynn, Susquehanna County, Pennsylvania, an historic community now part of Springville in Susquehanna County, Pennsylvania
- Lynn, Utah, an unincorporated community
- Lynn, West Virginia, an unincorporated community
- Lynn, Wisconsin, a town
  - Lynn (community), Wisconsin, an unincorporated community
- Lynn Canal, an inlet in Alaska
- Lynn County, Texas
- Lynn Township (disambiguation)

== Other uses ==
- Lynn University, a private university in Boca Raton, Florida, United States
- Tropical Storm Lynn, name of multiple Pacific tropical cyclones

== See also ==
- Alan of Lynn (c. 1348 – c. 1423), English theologian
- Nicholas of Lynn, 14th century English astronomer
- Lyn (disambiguation)
- Lynne (disambiguation)
- Lin (disambiguation)
- Lynnville (disambiguation)
