= Lynne (surname) =

Lynne is an English and Scottish surname. It is derived from the Irish surname Lynn.

People with the surname (given or married, stage names not included) include:

- Betty Lynne (1911–2011), British actress
- Beverly Lynne (born 1973), American actress
- Bjørn Lynne (born 1966), Norwegian musician
- Carole Lynne (1918–2008), British theatre actress
- Darci Lynne (born 2004), American ventriloquist
- Deanna Lynne (born 1970), American television producer
- Donna Lynne (born 1953), American politician
- Ethel Lynne (1895–1943), American actress
- Gillian Lynne (1926–2018), English dancer, choreographer
- Gloria Lynne (1929–2013), American jazz singer
- Jaime Lynne (born 1979), American wrestler
- Jeff Lynne (born 1947), English musician
- Judy Lynne (born 1943), American actress
- Lisa Lynne, Celtic musician
- Liz Lynne (born 1948), English politician
- Michael Lynne (1941–2019), American film executive
- Rockie Lynne (born 1964), American singer-songwriter
- Seybourn Arthur Lynne (born 1877), Alabama politician
- Seybourn Harris Lynne (1907–2000), American judge
- Shelby Lynne (born 1968), American singer-songwriter
- Walter Lynne (fl. 1550), Flemish publisher and translator
- William Thynne Lynne (1835–1911), English author and astronomer's assistant

== See also ==
- Lynne (disambiguation)
- Lynne (given name)
- Linn (surname)
- Lyn (surname)
- Lynn (surname)
