= Lynn (given name) =

Predominantly unisex given name

- Gender: Unisex

Origin
- Origin: Celtic
- Meaning: Pond, Waterfall, Pool, Lake

Other names
- Alternative spelling: Lyn, Lyne, Lynne, Lin, Linn, Linne
- Related names: Lin, Linda, Linn, Linnell, Llyn Lyn, Lynae, Lynelle, Lynette, Lynna, Lynne, Lynnelle, Lynnette

Lynn or Lynne is a Unisex name given name in English-speaking countries. It comes from Welsh, meaning "lake".

== Notable people named Lynn or Lynne ==
=== Female ===
- Lynn (voice actress), Japanese voice actress
- Lynn Abbey (born 1948), American author
- Lynne Abruzzo, American pathologist
- Lynn Ahrens (born 1948), American writer and lyricist
- Lynn Anderson (1947–2015), American singer
- Lynn Alvarez (born 1985), American mixed martial artist
- Lynn Amowitz, American physician and researcher
- Lynn Barber (born 1944), British journalist
- Lynn Bertholet (born 1959), Swiss bank executive
- Lynne Block, Canadian politician
- Lyn Mikel Brown (born 1956), American academic, author, feminist and activist
- Lynne Butler (born 1955), American mathematician
- Lynn Carlin (born 1938), American actress
- Lynne Cheney (born 1941), American author, scholar and talk-show host
- Lynn Cherny (born 1967), American data analysis consultant
- Lynn Collins (born 1977), American actress
- Lynn Conway (1938–2024), American computer scientist
- Lynn Deas (1952–2020), American professional bridge player
- Lynn Farleigh (born 1942), British actress
- Lynne Featherstone (born 1951), British politician
- Lynn Flewelling (born 1958) American author
- Lynn Franklin (1946–2021), American writer
- Lynn Goldsmith (born 1948), American recording artist and portrait photographer
- Lynn Hilary (born 1982), Irish singer, guitarist and songwriter
- Lynn Jennings (born 1960), American long-distance runner
- Lynn Kramer, American skateboarder
- Lynn Mahoney (born 1964), American university president
- Lynn Margulis (1938–2011), American theorist and biologist, author, educator and popularizer
- Lynn Martin, American banker, 68th president of the New York Stock Exchange
- Lynn McBain, professor of general practice in New Zealand
- Lynne McGranger (born 1953), Australian actress
- Lynn Melton, member of the Kansas House of Representatives
- Lynn Nakamoto (born 1960), American judge
- Lynne Neagle (born 1968), Welsh politician
- J. Lynn Palmer, American biostatistician
- Lynn Redgrave (1943–2010), English-American actress
- Lynn N. Rivers (born 1956), American politician and lawyer
- Lynne Stewart (1939–2017), American lawyer and criminal
- Lynne Marie Stewart (1946–2025), American actress
- Lynne Stopkewich (born 1964), Canadian film director
- Lynne Taylor-Corbett (1956–2025), American choreographer, director, lyricist, and composer
- Lynne Thigpen (1948–2003), African-American actress and singer
- Lynn Turner, multiple people
- Lynn Vidali (born 1952), American swimmer
- Lynn Whitfield (born 1953), American actress and producer
- Lynn Faulds Wood (1948–2020), Scottish television presenter and journalist
- Lynn Perry Wooten, American academic administrator
- Lynn Zelevansky (born 1947), American art curator
- Lynn Zhang (born 1989), former Chinese tennis player

=== Male ===
- Lynn Allen (1891–1958), American football player
- Lynn H. Becklin (born 1932), American politician
- Lynn Bowden (born 1997), American football player
- Lynn Bradford, American football player
- Lynn Chadwick (1914–2003), English sculptor and artist
- Lynn Compton (1921–2012), American lawyer and soldier
- Lynn Council (1933–2026), American police brutality victim
- Lynn Davies (born 1942), Welsh athlete
- Lynn Dean (1923–2022), American politician
- Lynn Dickey (born 1949), American football player
- Lynn W. Enquist, American molecular biologist
- Lynn Frazier, Governor of North Dakota
- Lynn Harrell (1944–2020), American classical cellist
- Lynn M. Hilton (1924–2010), American politician
- Lynn Matthews (born 1944), American athlete
- Lynn Okamoto (born 1970), Japanese Mangaka
- Lynn Riggs (1899–1954), American playwright
- Lynn Nolan Ryan, Jr. (born 1947), American baseball player
- Lynn Shackelford (born 1947), American basketball player
- Lynn Strait (1968–1998), American singer
- Lynn Swann (born 1952), American athlete
- Lynn Thomas (1959–2021), American football player

== Notable people with Lynn as a middle name ==
- Jeff Goldblum (born 1952), American actor (full name Jeffrey Lynn Goldblum)

== Fictional characters ==
- Lynn, a Dauntless-born character in Veronica Roth's Divergent
- Lynn Loud Jr., one of the main characters and fifth child of the eleven Loud siblings in The Loud House
- Lynne, a.k.a. Lynette Bishop, a character from the mixed-media franchise Strike Witches

== See also ==
- All articles beginning with "Lynn"
- Dublin, derivation Dubh Linn ("black pool")
- Lyn (given name)
- Lynne (surname)
- Lynn (surname)
