= William Lynn =

William Lynn may refer to:

- Bill Lynn (1921–2000), American baseball player
- Billy Lynn (1947-2014), former English professional footballer
- William Henry Lynn (1829–1915), Irish-born architect
- Msgr. William J. Lynn, Roman Catholic official on trial in 2012 in a conspiracy and endangerment/child sex abuse case in Philadelphia
- William J. Lynn III (born 1954), Deputy Secretary of Defense of the United States of America
- William Harkins Lynn (1888–1952), American actor who played Judge Gaffney in Harvey (1950)
- William Michael Lynn, professor at Cornell University's School of Hotel Administration
- William Thynne Lynn (1835–1911), English astronomer and author

== See also ==
- William Linn (disambiguation)
