= Linn Township =

Linn Township may refer to:

- Linn Township, Woodford County, Illinois
- Linn Township, Cedar County, Iowa
- Linn Township, Dallas County, Iowa
- Linn Township, Washington County, Kansas, in Washington County, Kansas
- Linn Township, Audrain County, Missouri
- Linn Township, Cedar County, Missouri
- Linn Township, Dent County, Missouri
- Linn Township, Moniteau County, Missouri
- Linn Township, Osage County, Missouri
- Linn Township, Hand County, South Dakota, in Hand County, South Dakota
