= Clay T. Whitehead =

U.S. Government Official (1938–2008)

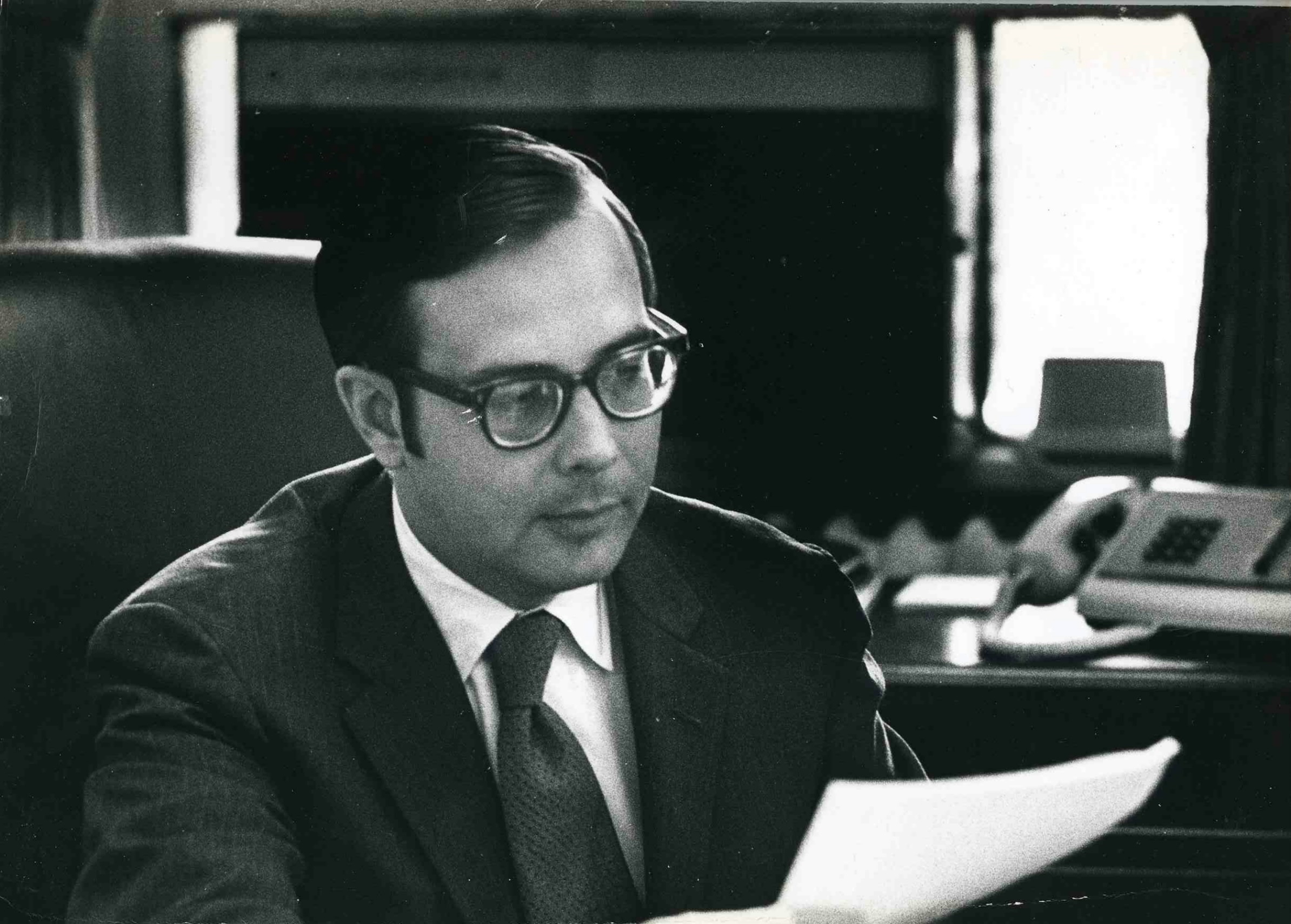
Clay T. Whitehead at the Office of Telecommunications Policy in Washington, D.C. (early 1970s)

Clay T. "Tom" Whitehead (November 13, 1938 – July 23, 2008) was a United States government official who served as special assistant to the president from 1968 to 1970; director of the White House Office of Telecommunications Policy (OTP) from 1970 to 1974 during the Nixon administration; director of the Ford Transition Team immediately before Nixon's resignation; and an operative in the White House during the initial phases of the Ford transition. Whitehead pioneered a policy of competition across the telecommunications industries, which later was reflected in legislation and regulations in the United States and around the world.

== Early life ==
Whitehead was born in Neodesha, Kansas, the eldest of four children of Clay B. and Helen Hinton Whitehead.

As a young boy, he was interested in telecommunications, spending hours on his ham radio talking to amateur radio operators around the world. He practiced photography with a darkroom of his own design and built his own celestial telescope for studying space.

== Education and early career ==
He graduated from Cherokee County High School in Columbus, Cherokee County, Kansas 1957.

He attended the Massachusetts Institute of Technology, earning his undergraduate and master's degrees in electrical engineering, in 1961 respectively, and a Ph.D. in management in 1967. In addition, Whitehead engaged in extensive studies in economics, which almost qualified him to write a dissertation in the field, but instead decided finally to leave MIT.

From 1958 to 1960 he worked at Bell Telephone Laboratories, Murray Hill, NJ, between 1958 and 1960 under the MIT cooperative program developing experimental design of pulse and analog electronic equipment.

Before joining the Nixon campaign in 1968 as an expert on budget policies, Whitehead was a RAND Corporation economist and defense analyst.

== The White House Years ==
Between 1969 and 1970, Whitehead served as special assistant to President Richard Nixon. In this capacity, he crafted the “Open Skies” domestic satellite policy that allowed any qualified private company to launch communications satellites, thereby deregulating the monopoly model for the technology. The policy enabled cable television networks including C-SPAN, CNN, and HBO to prosper and created a ripple effect that ultimately led to sweeping and lasting changes in the telecommunications landscape.

In 1970, Whitehead led the effort to create the White House Office of Telecommunications Policy (OTP), which he announced at a White House Press conference on January 23, 1970. Having tried to recruit heads for the new office, and finding none that fit the description he had in mind, he took the job himself and was confirmed by the U. S. Senate in 1970. Brian Lamb was director for Congressional and media relations, resigning in 1974, and Antonin Scalia was the general counsel for OTP at that time. Inspired by the OTP mantra of "manyvoices," Lamb founded C-SPAN in 1979. Scalia resigned in 1972 to become chairman of the Administrative Conference of the United States, before becoming an associate justice of the Supreme Court of the United States in 1986.

One of OTP's accomplishments included ending the regulatory freeze on the infant cable industry, which then permitted it to compete with television broadcasting and, eventually, the established telephone industry.

Whitehead's policies also impacted broadcasting directly. “He was credited with formulating policies that gave more autonomy to local stations in the public broadcasting system, which was seen by some PBS executives as an attack on the service in large part because of Dr. Whitehead's early reputation for antagonizing the press.”

In a noted 1972 speech, Whitehead used the terms "elitist gossip" and "ideological plugola" to echo the Nixon administration's claims of liberal bias in network news. Walter Cronkite claims in his memoir that Whitehead suggested to affiliate stations that they need not carry network news reports such as Cronkite's, and instead could rely on wire dispatches.

In the spring of 1974, while still working for Nixon and at the encouragement of Gerald Ford's former law partner, Philip Buchen, later counsel to President Ford, Whitehead secretly organized and led the effort, including Jonathan Moore, assistant to Attorney General Elliot Richardson; Brian Lamb, by then a broadcast journalist; and Laurence Lynn, Jr., assistant secretary for policy, health education and welfare, to plan Vice President Ford's transition to the presidency.

== Post-government career ==
After leaving government, Whitehead was a visiting fellow at Harvard University and MIT.

Whitehead joined Hughes Aircraft and founded the Hughes Communications subsidiary that launched the Galaxy satellite system, one of the first geostationary satellites. The Galaxy business became the model for satellite television distribution and broadcasting around the world.

Whitehead left Hughes in 1983 and founded Société Européenne des Satellites (SES S.A.), the first private satellite business in Europe, which was based in Luxembourg. Whitehead's design for SES upended the monopolies of government-run, language-specific television and grew tremendously to become the world's largest satellite system.

In 2005, Whitehead was a distinguished visiting professor of communications policy at George Mason University School of Law in Virginia.

During this time, he was also president of Clay Whitehead Associates, an international business development company working primarily in the telecom and television industries.

== Honors ==
In 2005, Whitehead was inducted into the Hall of Fame of the Society of Satellite Professionals International.

In February 2009, The Commonwealth of Virginia passed a house and senate resolution, mourning Whitehead's death and celebrating his life achievements.

== Personal ==
Whitehead served as chairman of the Yosemite National Institutes board of directors from 1972 to 1985 and a board member until 1993.

Whitehead also served from 1984 to 2008 as a member of the board of directors, Prudential Mutual Funds Family; he was the founder and chairman of the governance committee, as well as director or trustee variously of 116 mutual funds.

== Death ==
Dr. Whitehead died of prostate cancer in Washington, D.C., on July 23, 2008. He was 69 and lived in McLean, Virginia. In 1973, he had married Margaret Mahon. He was survived by his wife, a son, Clay, and a daughter, Abigail Craine. In 2013 his papers were donated to and celebrated in an accession ceremony at the Library of Congress.
