= William Linn =

William Linn may refer to:

- William Linn (clergyman) (1752–1808), President of Queen's College (now Rutgers University) and Chaplain of the United States House of Representatives
- William Linn (soldier) (died 1836?), believed to have fought and died in the Battle of the Alamo
- William Alexander Linn (1846–1917), American journalist and historian

== See also ==
- William Lynn (disambiguation)
