= Lynn Township, Illinois =

Lynn Township, Illinois may refer to one of the following townships:

- Lynn Township, Henry County, Illinois
- Lynn Township, Knox County, Illinois

See also

- Lynn Township (disambiguation)
