= David Joy =

David Joy may refer to:

- David Joy (author) (born 1983), American novelist
- David Joy (engineer) (1825–1903), locomotive and marine engineer, designer of the Joy valve gear
- David Joy (footballer) (born 1943), former professional footballer
