= Jenny Lynn (disambiguation) =

Jenny Lynn (c. 1942–2021) was a professional figure competitor.

Jenny Lynn, Jenny Lyn, or Jennylyn may also refer to:

- Jenny Lynn (photographer) (born 1953), American photographer
- Jenny-Lyn Anderson (born 1992), Australian swimmer
- Jennylyn Mercado (born 1987), Filipina actress
- Jennylyn Reyes (born 1991), Filipino volleyball player

== See also ==
- Jenny Lind (1820–1887), Swedish opera singer
