= Linn (surname) =

Linn is a surname. Notable people with the surname include:

- Amnon Linn (1924–2016), Israeli politician
- Bettina Linn (1905–1962), American novelist and college professor
- George Ward Linn (1884-1966), American philatelist and journal publisher
- Grace Walls Linn (1874-1940), American composer
- James Weber Linn (1876–1939), American politician and educator
- Karl Linn (1923–2005), landscape architect, psychologist, educator, and community activist
- Lewis F. Linn (1796-1843), U.S. Senator of Missouri
- Rex Linn (born 1956), American actor
- Richard Linn, Senior Judge U.S. Court of Appeals for the Federal Circuit
- Robert Linn (politician) (1908–2004), American politician
- Robert Linn (composer) (1925–1999), American composer
- Robert L. Linn (1938–2015), American educational psychologist
- Roger Linn, inventor of the Linn LM-1, the first programmable digital drum machine
- William Linn (clergyman) (1752–1808), President of Queen's College (now Rutgers University) and Chaplain of the United States House of Representatives
- William Linn (soldier) (died 1836?), believed to have fought and died in the Battle of the Alamo
- William Alexander Linn (1846–1917), American journalist and historian

== See also ==
- Lin (surname)
- Lynn (surname)
