= Office of Telecommunications Policy =

After President Richard Nixon took office in 1969, Clay T. Whitehead, Special Assistant to the President, pushed to establish an executive office dedicated to telecommunications policy. The White House Office of Telecommunications Policy (OTP) was established in 1970. In 1978, it was merged, along with the Commerce Department's Office of Telecommunications, into the newly created National Telecommunications and Information Administration (NTIA).

== Directors and staff ==
The first director of the OTP was Clay T. Whitehead who served from 1970 to 1974. After Whitehead resigned, John M. Eger served as acting director from 1974 to 1976 until Thomas J. Houser was appointed OTP Director in 1976.

Under Whitehead's tenure, notable individuals who worked at OTP include Supreme Court Justice Antonin Scalia, who served as General Counsel, and C-SPAN founder and CEO Brian Lamb, who handled Congressional and press relations.

== Policy ==
During Whitehead's tenure, the OTP worked to unfreeze and deregulate the cable industry and implement the "Open Skies" policy. "Open Skies" had emerged from months of study by the Domestic Satellite Policy Working Group, a group that in 1969, as Special Assistant to the President, Whitehead had suggested, organized, and headed. "Open Skies," announced as Executive Branch policy in a White House Press Conference in January, 1970 and approved by the FCC in June, 1972, functioned to privatize the satellite industry by allowing for any qualified company to launch a domestic communications satellite. "Open Skies" rejected the monopoly industry structure that applied in international communications.

The OTP was also responsible for Nixon Administration policy towards the Corporation for Public Broadcasting.

== Cable ==
OTP's two major initiatives concerning cable included the 1971 Cable Copyright Compromise and the 1974 Cabinet Committee on Cable Communications Cable: Report to the President, or "The Whitehead Report."

OTP took a strong interest in supporting cable's development in part because Whitehead saw that "cable promises a revolutionary diversity and a fundamentally new system of communication."

In 1971 and 1972, cable operators were blocked by copyright owners and broadcasters who demanded fees for distributing their programs. OTP facilitated a Cable Copyright Compromise that pacified cable opponents enough to permit some industry growth.

Two years later, a Cabinet Committee on Cable chaired by Whitehead released a report denouncing industry regulation. Until the committee's report, cable had been seen as an extension of broadcast television, and subject to its regulations. But the 1974 Cabinet Committee on Cable Communications Cable: Report to the President advocated applying a different regulatory model to cable. It argued in part that cable did not use the publicly owned airwaves and promised a multitude of channels instead of the limited number necessitated by spectrum scarcity, which meant that cable and the television networks were not analogous businesses. Accordingly, the report reasoned, cable should be afforded the same freedom of expression as the print media.

== AT&T ==
Consistent with OTP's goal to increase competition and technological innovation within telecommunications industries, OTP worked to loosen AT&T's hold on U.S. telephone service.

The Nixon Administration launched its first volley against AT&T in January 1970 when it announced its "Open Skies" policy that allowed all qualifying companies to launch commercial satellites. This defeated AT&T's expectations that the White House would give monopoly control to Comsat, of which AT&T owned 29 percent, the largest share held by any single company.

OTP further weakened AT&T's monopoly by supporting a Department of Justice antitrust investigation of, and then litigation against, AT&T.

OTP's chief economist, Bruce M. Owen, favored breaking up AT&T and persuaded Whitehead that the best way to split the company was the way in which it was finally done, by separating long distance from local service – known as horizontal divestiture.

OTP supported the Department of Justice through testimony before a Senate Antitrust and Monopoly subcommittee hearing concerning a bill that would break up big businesses in industries including communications. Whitehead's testimony explained that historically, competition was the preferred regulatory tool in the U.S., and that it applied equally in telecommunications as in any other industry. Monopoly in the telephone business, he explained, was not a necessary structure in the nation's telecommunications industry and, in fact, the existing regulatory scheme had become "a barrier to competition and innovation required for the future direction of communications." Whitehead stated that, moreover, no special public policy considerations such as national defense necessitated the AT&T monopoly. It was unbecoming for "AT&T to use its legal, political and economic power to seek to extend its monopoly" where monopoly was not warranted, and "the Government cannot let such an effort go unnoticed or unchecked." He also said that "the anti-trust laws should be enforced to ensure that regulatory mechanisms cannot become a haven for escape from competition."

Some weeks later, the Department of Justice filed the antitrust case that ultimately led to the break-up of AT&T along the lines that Bruce M. Owen had suggested, with AT&T retaining its long-distance services, Western Electric and Bell Laboratories, and giving up its local telephone companies.
