= Lyn (given name) =

Lyn is a unisex given name. Notable people with the name include:

- Lyn Allison (born 1946), Australian politician
- Lyn Ashley, Australian actress who worked in the United Kingdom on television during the 1960s
- Lyn Ashton (born 1951), American slalom canoeist
- Lyn Bell (born 1967), Australian freestyle swimmer
- Lyn Bennet, American politician from Montana
- Lyn Brown, British politician
- Lyn Mikel Brown (born 1956), American academic, author and feminist
- Lyn Chevli (1931–2016), American cartoonist
- Lyn Collingwood, Australian television and film actress
- Lyn Collins (1948–2005), American soul singer
- Lyn Duff (born 1976), American journalist
- Lyn Evans (born 1945), Welsh scientist
- Lyn Gardner, British theatre critic and children's writer
- Lyn Gunson (born 1953), New Zealand netball player and coach
- Lyn Harding (1867–1952), British actor
- Lyn Hejinian (born 1941), American poet, essayist, translator and publisher
- Lyn Lary (1906–1973), American baseball player
- Lyn James, Welsh actress
- Lyn Jones (born 1964), Welsh rugby union player
- Lyn Marshall (1944–1992), British yoga teacher
- Lyn McLean (1944/1945 – 2017), New Zealand lawn bowler
- Lyn Moran (born 1978), American entertainer
- Lyn Murray (1909–1989), British composer and conductor
- Lyn Paul (born 1949), English pop singer and actress
- Lyn St. James (born 1947), American race car driver

== Fictional characters ==
- Lyn Scully, from the Australian soap opera Neighbours

== See also ==
- Llyn (name)
- Lyn (surname)
- Lynn (given name)
