= Lin =

LIN or LIN may refer to:

== People ==
- Lin (surname) (normally 林), a Chinese surname
- Lin (The King of Fighters), Chinese assassin character
- Lin Chow Bang, character in Fat Pizza
- Lin (NouerA) (Chinese name Lin Hanzhong Korean name Lim Hanjung), a Member of boygroup NouerA
- Lin (futsal player) (born 1986), Spanish futsal player

== Places ==
- Lin, Iran, a village in Mazandaran Province
- Lin, Korçë, village in Pogradec municipality, Albania
- Lin County, Henan, now Linzhou, China
- Lin County, Shanxi, in China
- Lincolnshire, Chapman code LIN

== Transport ==
- Linate Airport, Milan, Italy
- Linlithgow railway station, West Lothian, Scotland

== Other uses ==
- LIN Media, a US TV broadcaster
- Lingala language, a Bantu language of central Africa
- Local Interconnect Network, a network protocol used in vehicles
- lin., an abbreviation for linear

== See also ==
- Linn (disambiguation)
- Lyn (disambiguation)
- Lynn (given name)
