= Lyn =

Lyn or LYN may refer to:

== People ==
- Lyn (singer), South Korean singer
- Lyn (gamer), South Korean Warcraft III player
- Lyn (given name)
- Lyn (surname)

== In science and technology ==
- Lynx (constellation), standard abbreviation
- Lyn (locomotive), a British narrow gauge railway locomotive built in 1897 for the Lynton and Barnstaple Railway
- Lyn (Src family kinase), in biochemistry
- LyN, a video game engine

== In fiction ==
- Lyn Me, a character in the Star Wars universe
- Lyndis, a character from the Fire Emblem series

== Other uses ==
- Lyn, Ontario, Canada, a community within the township of Elizabethtown-Kitley
- Lyon–Bron Airport (IATA code LYN)
- Lyn Fotball, Norwegian football club from Oslo established in 1896
- HNoMS Lyn, the name of ships of the Royal Norwegian Navy

== See also ==
- Lynn (disambiguation)
- Lin (disambiguation)
