= Lynne =

Lynne may refer to:

- Lynne (given name)
- Lynne (surname)
- Lynne, Florida, an unincorporated community
- Lynne, Wisconsin, a town in Oneida County, Wisconsin, United States
