= Bruce M. Owen =

American economist

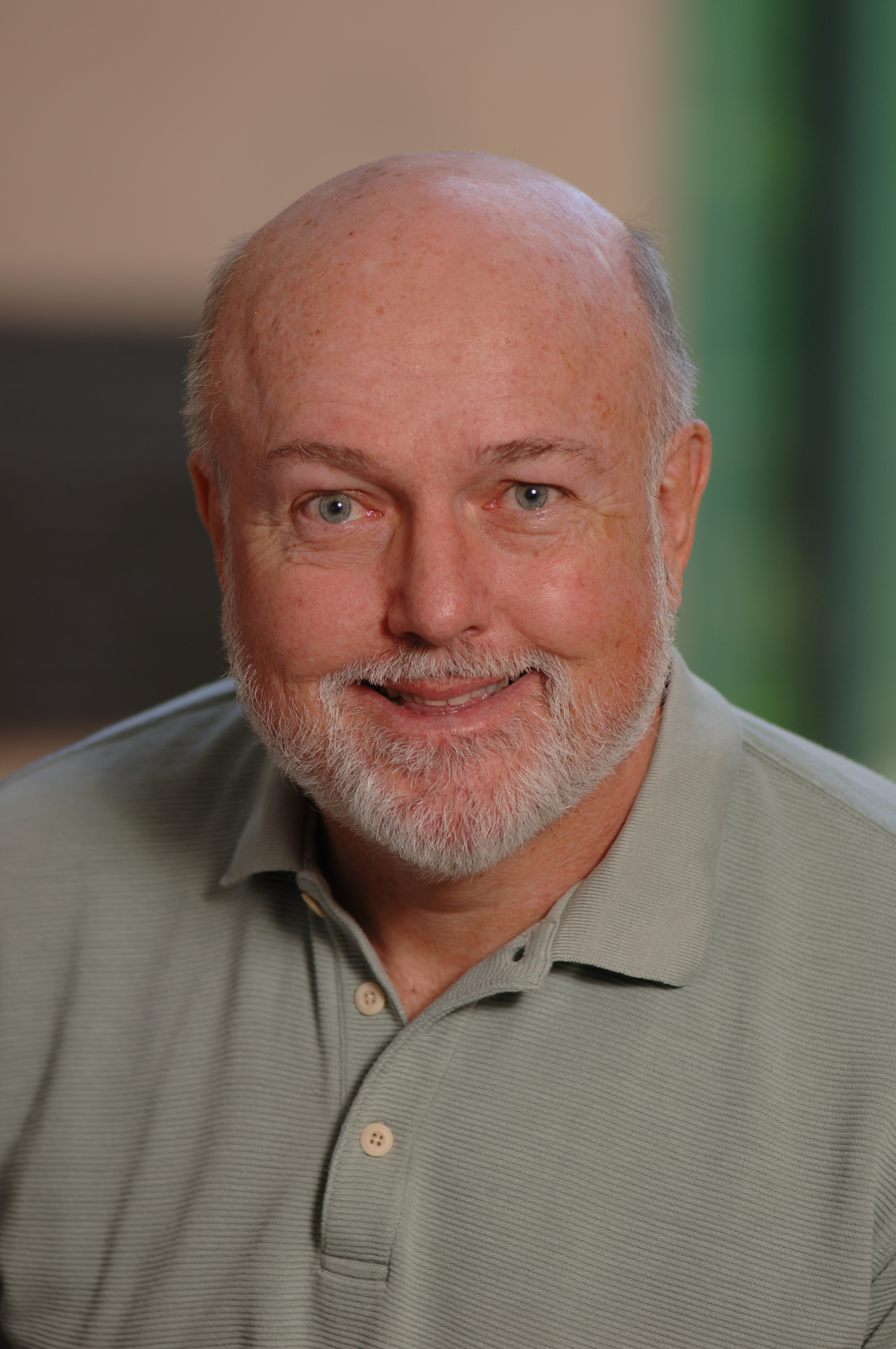
- Born: October 13, 1943 (age 82); Worcester, Massachusetts
- Occupation: Economist
- Known for: Deregulation of AT&T

Bruce M. Owen (born October 13, 1943, in Worcester, Massachusetts) is an economist and author. Owen is the Morris M. Doyle Professor in Public Policy, Emeritus, in the School of Humanities and Sciences at Stanford University, and the Gordon Cain Senior Fellow, Emeritus, in Stanford's Institute for Economic Policy Research.

== Early life and education ==
Owen graduated with a BA from Williams College in 1965, where he was a merit scholar, and subsequently earned his PhD in Economics from Stanford University in 1970. At Stanford, Owen was a Woodrow Wilson fellow, National Defense Education Act Title IV fellow, and Brookings Institution Economic Policy fellow.

== Career ==
Owen acted as chief economist in the White House Office of Telecommunications Policy in 1971 before returning to Stanford University in 1973 to serve as assistant professor of economics. From 1974 to 1975, Owen was a Hoover Institution national fellow.

In 1978, Owen moved to Chapel Hill, North Carolina, where he briefly taught at Duke University as associate professor of business and law. During this time, Owen was an Aspen Institute for Humanistic Studies fellow and chairman of the task force on the future of the United States Postal Service.

In 1979, Owen became chief economist of the Antitrust Division of the United States Department of Justice, where he played a key role in the ultimate deregulation of AT&T. During the landmark trial of the breakup of AT&T (American Telephone & Telegraph), Owen testified as the Chief Economist of the US Justice Department. He presented compelling economic analysis that AT&T was in violation of the Sherman Antitrust Act. The outcome of the trial was that AT&T was indeed a monopoly and Judge Greene ordered that AT&T therefore must allow competitors into the communication industry. From that point on, the prices of telecommunications fell, not only for governments and businesses, but for the average telephone user around the world.

Owen entered the private sector with the 1981 co-founding of Economists Incorporated, a consulting firm. He served as president and chairman of the board of the company until his retirement in 2003. During this time, Owen also taught an undergraduate seminar on economic analysis of law at Stanford's Washington, D.C. campus from 1989 to 2002. Economists Incorporated is now a division of Secretariate.

Owen served as the Gordon Cain Senior Fellow at the Stanford Institute for Economic Policy Research (SIEPR) from 2003 - 2015 and as the Morris M. Doyle Professor of Public Policy and Director of the Public Policy Program at Stanford from 2005 - 2015. He proposed and oversaw the addition of a Masters degree offering in the program.

Owen is a member of the American Economic Association, the Econometric Society, the American Law and Economics Association, an associate of the American Bar Association, and a consultant to the World Bank.

== Books ==
- Television Economics (1974)
- Economics and Freedom of Expression' (1975)
- The Regulation Game (1978)
- The Political Economy of Deregulation (1983)
- Video Economics (1992)
- Electric Utility Mergers: Principles of Antitrust Analysis (1994)
- The Economics of a Disaster: The Exxon Valdez Oil Spill (1995)
- The Internet Challenge to Television (1999)
- Madison's Missing Branch: How Americans Can Reduce Their Pain From Political Corruption in Washington (Kindle) 2021

== Personal life ==
Owen is married to Josetta Owen and has two adult children, Bradford Kelly (born 1974), and Peter Brandon (born 1969).
