= Bank Buildings, Belfast =

Listed building in Belfast, Northern Ireland

Bank Buildings
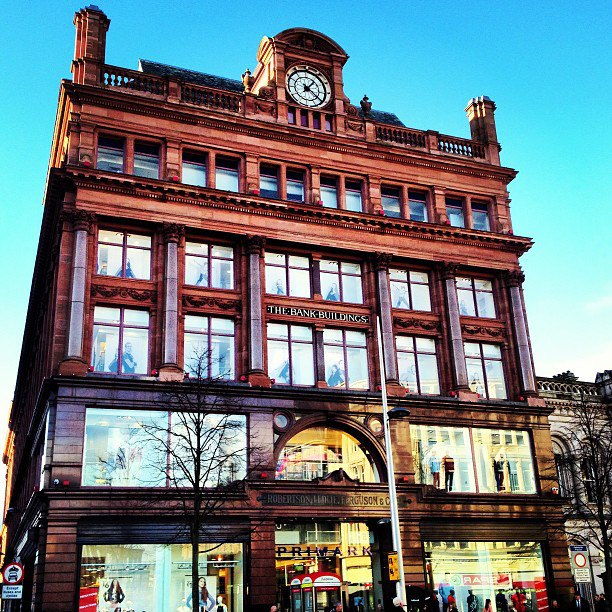
- The Bank Buildings (2013)

- Location within Greater Belfast

General information
- Status: Restored
- Type: Retail
- Location: 1-27 Castle Street, Belfast, Northern Ireland
- Construction started: 1785; 1855; 1899; 2019
- Completed: 1787; 1855; 1900; 2022
- Renovated: 1938; 1979-1980; 2005; 2016-2018
- Renovation cost: £30 million (2016-2018)
- Client: Waddell Cunningham (1785); Hawkins, Robertson & Co. (1855 & 1900); Primark (2019)
- Owner: Primark Stores Limited

Technical details
- Structural system: Cast iron structure clad in red Dumfries stone
- Floor count: 5

Design and construction
- Architects: Sir Robert Taylor (1785); William Henry Lynn (1900)
- Designations

Listed Building – Grade B1
- Official name: The Bank Buildings

The Bank Buildings is a Grade B1-listed five-storey building located at the intersection of Castle Street and Royal Avenue in Belfast, Northern Ireland. It was designed and built between 1899 and 1900 by W. H. Lynn as a department store and warehouse, owned by the firm of Robertson, Ledlie, Ferguson & Co. It stands on the site of a bank erected in 1785, from which it takes its name.

Since 1979, it has been owned by the Dublin-based company Primark, and serves as their flagship store in Northern Ireland.

On 28 August 2018, during a £30 million two-year renovation, the building was gutted by fire, severely damaging most of the internal structure. Primark opted to restore the building to its 1900 appearance while expanding the size of the store. The store reopened on 1 November 2022.

== History ==
=== First building ===
The first Bank Buildings was a three-storey building designed by Sir Robert Taylor and erected by Waddell Cunningham between 1785 and 1787, known as Cunningham's Bank. The bank closed in 1798 and the building was converted to residential use, becoming the residence of the Church of Ireland bishop of Down and Connor, Rev. Dr. William Dickson.

The site of the bank was known as a place for public executions, with the last execution being carried out in 1816, on the doorstep of the building.

=== Second building ===
In 1853, the store became home to a wholesale drapery firm. The original building was replaced in 1855 by a four-storey building for Hawkins, Robertson & Co. The business was formed into a limited liability company in 1880. Founded by businessmen William Robertson and Henry Hawkins (Waterford), J. C. Ledlie (Cork), and Robert Ferguson (Belfast), the business soon expanded and became a commercial department store.

=== Third building ===
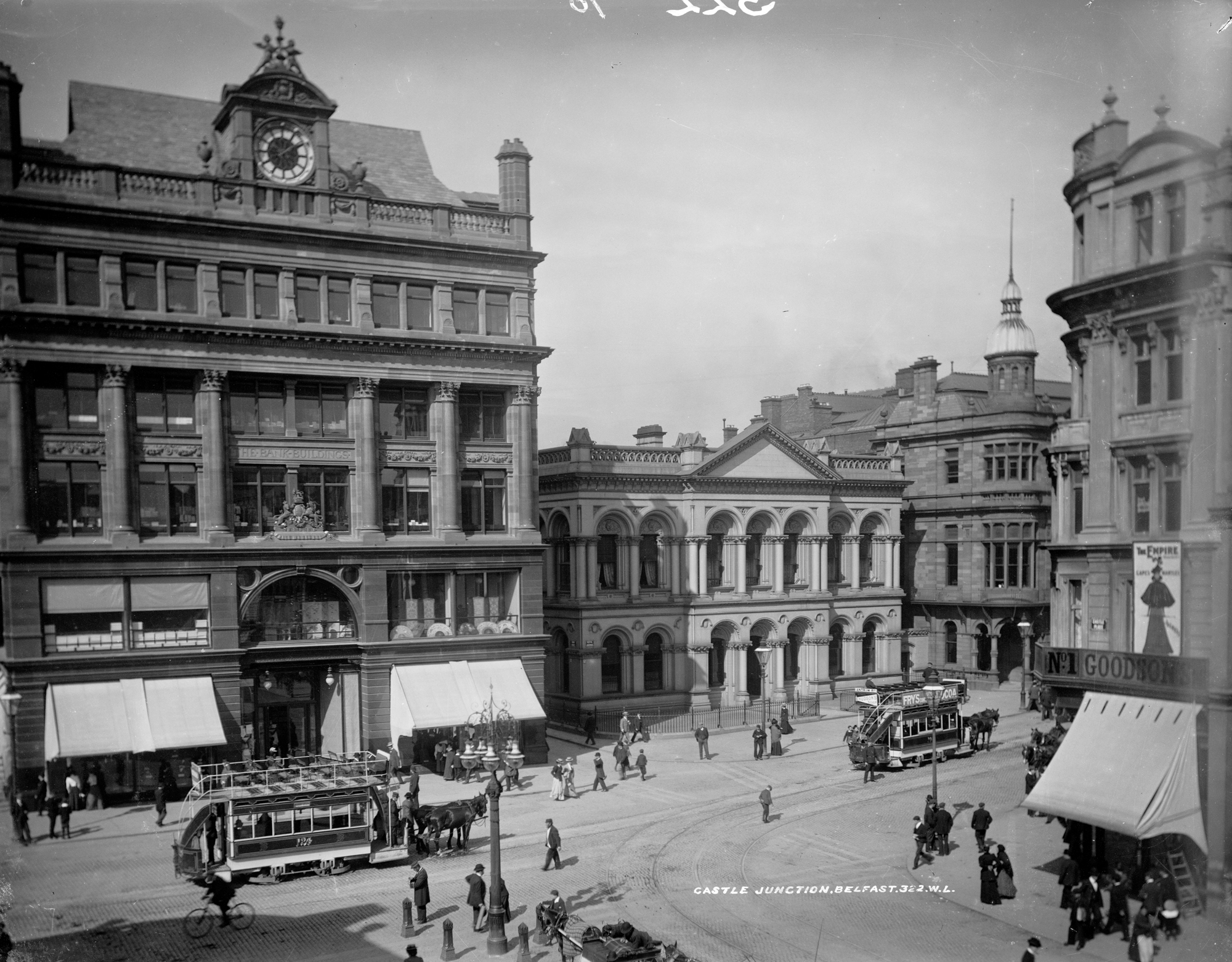
The Bank Buildings, along the left of the image, circa 1900

The best known Bank Buildings were constructed between 1899 and 1900. The architect W. H. Lynn allowed for large plate glass windows to be installed in the lower floors. The retail business occupied the ground and first floors of the building with the upper storeys devoted to the wholesale trade. This arrangement continued until 1961 when the wholesale operation was relocated and the retail business expanded. The building remained under the ownership of Robertson, Ledlie, Ferguson & Co. until the House of Fraser group took control of the company in 1969. On 9 April 1975, three bombs were detonated inside Bank Buildings, starting a fire that extensively damaged the building. The department store closed in 1979 with the building sold to Primark Stores Limited. After eighteen months of refurbishment works a new Primark store opened at The Bank Buildings. They continue to trade from the site.

=== Extension and refurbishment ===
In 2016, Primark announced it was expanding the building by 30,000 sq ft (2,800 m^{2}) and refurbishing it, creating 100 new jobs once completed. The expansion cost an estimated £30m and was expected to be completed in September 2018. Commonwealth House, which occupied 29-43 Castle Street was demolished between September 2016 and April 2017 and the extension was built in its place.

=== August 2018 Fire and restoration ===
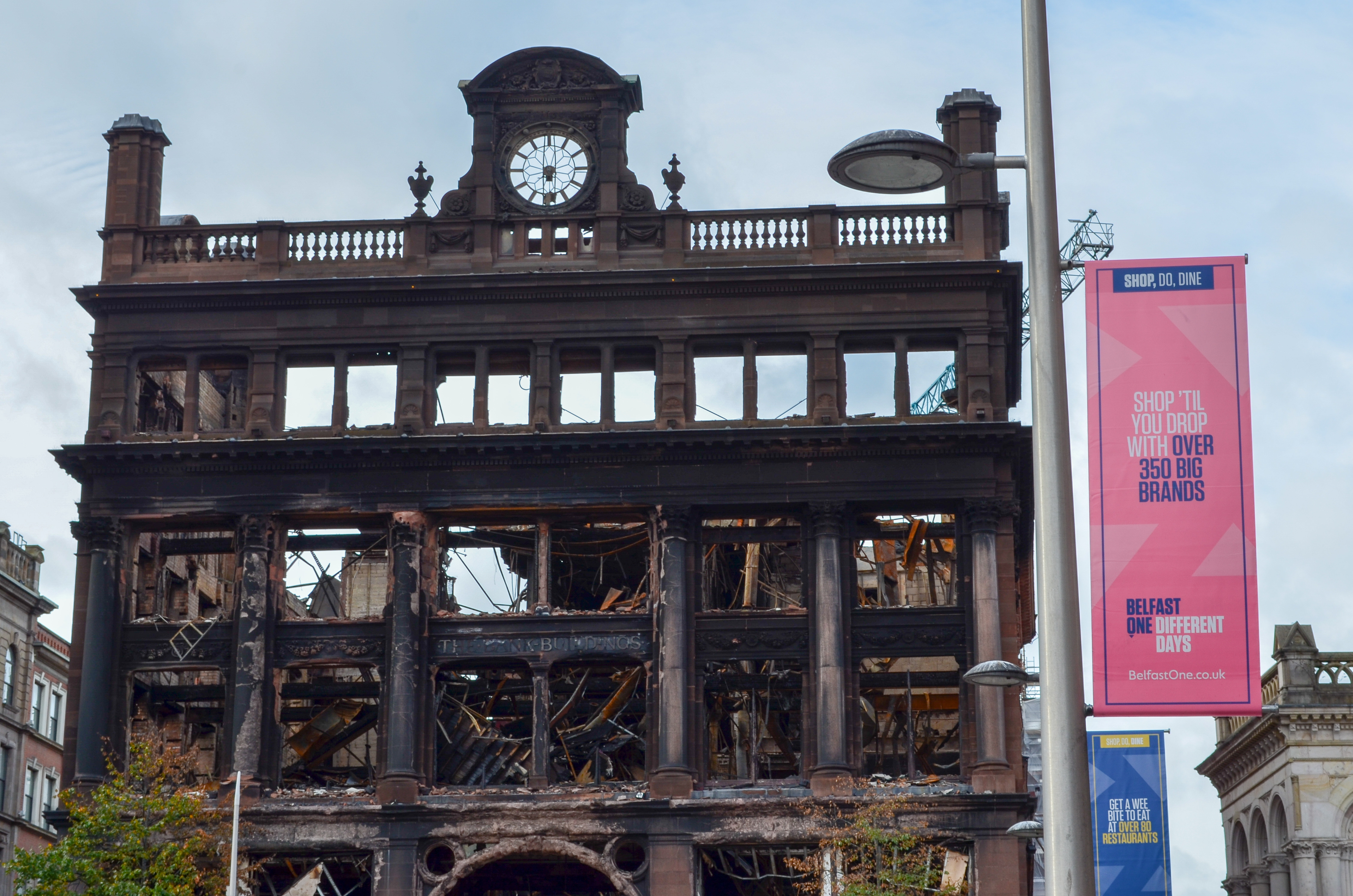
Bank Buildings after the August 2018 fire.

On 28 August 2018, a fire broke out at roughly 11:00 BST near the roof of the building during business hours. Shoppers and staff were evacuated from the ground and first floors, and 11 fire appliances were called. The area around was cordoned off for public safety, and due to falling debris. The roof collapsed and the clock face was burnt out with the hands staying still at about 11:05. The fire was still spreading and had covered all floors of the building by 15:00 with more appliances called in to assist. The building suffered extensive damage to all levels, however the new wing of the building was relatively undamaged. In September 2018, a specialist team from London based firm Keltbray was called in to manage and undertake to extremely difficult job of making safe and demolition of part of the structure.

In October 2018, Primark sent an application for planning permission to Belfast City Council, in order to completely restore the building to its original 1900 appearance. Permission was granted on 26 October 2018, with the initial stages aimed at reducing the safety cordon due to commence "immediately". The project commenced with emergency façade retention and demolition works by Keltbray. The upper two floors and roof level were taken down, which allowed a façade retention scheme to be put in place. The stonework recovered during the removal of the top two storeys was numbered and labelled, to be reused later in reconstruction. The iconic clock face was removed for restoration and eventual reinstatement.

On 3 December 2018, the area around Bank Buildings was reopened to pedestrians, with concrete-filled shipping containers being used to support the fragile façades, and to protect the public from any potential collapse. Demolition of the damaged interior structure was completed by Keltbray in late 2019.

Following reconstruction and restoration works, Primark reopened in Bank Buildings on 1 November 2022.

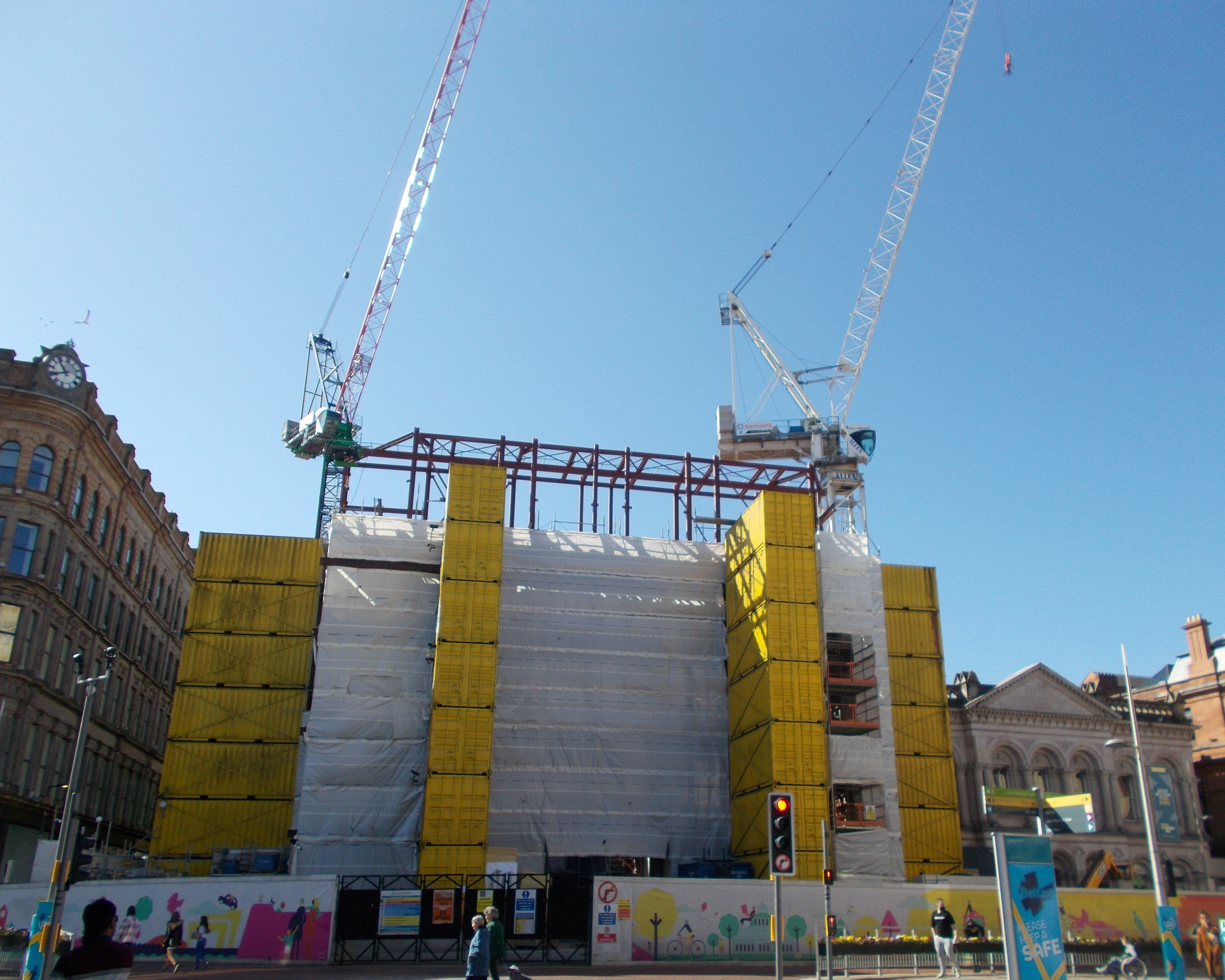
Rebuilding work on Bank Buildings, April 2021

== Bank Buildings Football Club ==
Representatives from the store attended the first ever meeting of the Northern Amateur Football League at Clarence Place Hall on 4 July 1923. The league was open to applications from public bodies, private associations, schools and firms. Although they originally submitted a team for the new league, Bank Buildings Football Club never played a competitive match. The club is, however, considered one of the founding members of the Amateur League.
