= 4358 Lynn =

Main-belt asteroid

Discovery
- Discovered by: P. H. Cowell
- Discovery site: Greenwich Obs.
- Discovery date: 5 October 1909

Designations
- Named after: William Thynne Lynn (astronomer and author)
- Alternative designations: A909 TF · 1943 VB; 1981 TO_{1} · 1985 SD_{6} 1988 GK
- Minor planet category: main-belt · Eunomia

Orbital characteristics
- Epoch 4 September 2017 (JD 2458000.5)
- Uncertainty parameter 0
- Observation arc: 107.67 yr (39,325 days)
- Aphelion: 3.0579 AU
- Perihelion: 2.1567 AU
- Semi-major axis: 2.6073 AU
- Eccentricity: 0.1728
- Orbital period (sidereal): 4.21 yr (1,538 days)
- Mean anomaly: 296.97°
- Mean motion: 0° 14^{m} 2.76^{s} / day
- Inclination: 13.084°
- Longitude of ascending node: 15.249°
- Argument of perihelion: 260.32°

Physical characteristics
- Dimensions: 9.12±0.37 km 10.53 km (calculated)
- Synodic rotation period: 3.8377±0.0006 h
- Geometric albedo: 0.21 (assumed); 0.307±0.034
- Spectral type: S
- Absolute magnitude (H): 12.10 · 12.2 · 12.84±0.64

4358 Lynn, provisional designation A909 TF, is a stony Eunomia asteroid from the central region of the asteroid belt, approximately 10 kilometers in diameter. It was discovered by British astronomer Philip Herbert Cowell at the Royal Greenwich Observatory on 5 October 1909. It was named for William Lynn, an assistant astronomer at the discovering observatory.

== Orbit and classification ==
Lynn is a member of the Eunomia family, a large group of stony asteroids and the most prominent family in the intermediate main-belt. It orbits the Sun in the central main-belt at a distance of 2.2–3.1 AU once every 4 years and 3 months (1,538 days). Its orbit has an eccentricity of 0.17 and an inclination of 13° with respect to the ecliptic. No precoveries or identifications were made prior to its discovery, and the asteroid's observation arc begins in 1909.

== Physical characteristics ==
=== Diameter and albedo ===
According to the survey carried out by NASA's Wide-field Infrared Survey Explorer with its subsequent NEOWISE mission, Lynn measures 9.1 kilometers in diameter and its surface has a high albedo of 0.307. The Collaborative Asteroid Lightcurve Link assumes a standard albedo for members of the Eunomia family of 0.21 and calculates a diameter of 10.5 kilometers with an absolute magnitude of 12.2.

=== Lightcurve ===
In April 2009, a rotational lightcurve of Lynn was obtained from photometric observations made at the Oakley Southern Sky Observatory (E09) in Australia. Lightcurve analysis gave a well-defined rotation period of 3.8377 hours with a brightness variation of 0.60 in magnitude (U=3).

== Naming ==
This minor planet is named for William Thynne Lynn (1835–1911), who worked for many years as an assistant at the Royal Greenwich Observatory during the second half of the 19th century. He was also an author of various well received books and many short notes on astronomical topics, which were printed in The Observatory. It was named by the Minor Planet Names Committee after a proposal by Brian G. Marsden. The approved naming citation was published by the Minor Planet Center on 1 September 1993 (M.P.C. 22501).
