= HNoMS Lyn =

HNoMS Lyn is the name of at least two ships of the Royal Norwegian Navy:

- HNoMS Lyn (1882), a 2.-class torpedo boat
- HNoMS Lyn (1896)

== See also ==
- Lyn (disambiguation)
