= Back Yard Burgers =

American regional franchise chain of restaurants in the Southern and Midwestern US

Back Yard Burgers, Inc.
- Logo used since 2016

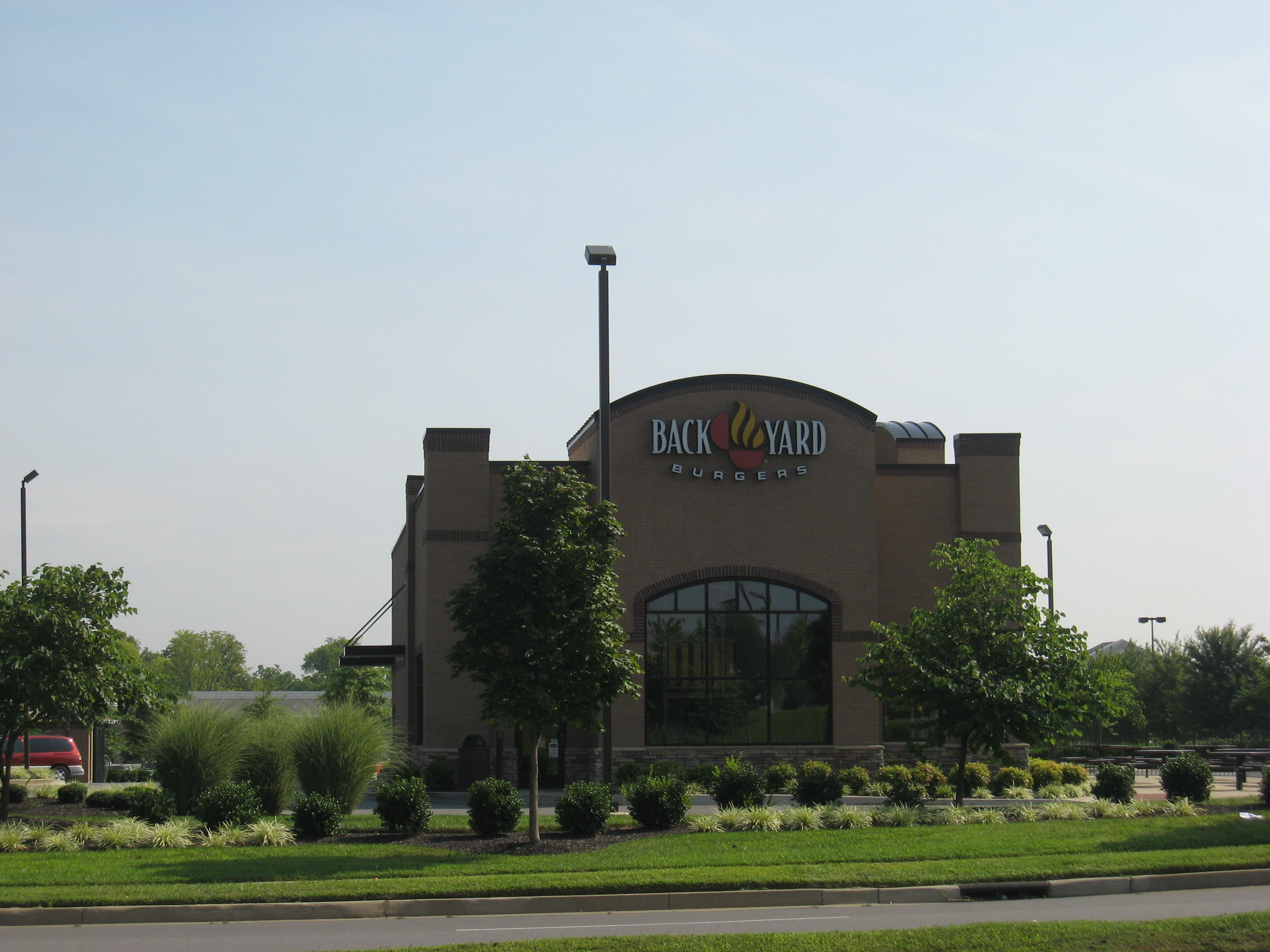
- A former Back Yard Burgers in Hendersonville, Tennessee
- Type: Subsidiary
- Industry: Restaurants
- Genre: Quick service
- Founded: April 21, 1987 (39 years ago) in Cleveland, Mississippi
- Founder: Lattimore M. Michael
- Headquarters: Nashville, Tennessee, U.S.
- Number of locations: 6 (September 2026)
- Area served: Southern and Midwestern United States
- Key people: Dennis Pfaff (CEO)
- Products: Hamburgers • chicken products • french fries • milkshakes • salads • hot dogs • chili products
- Revenue: ▲US$37 Million (2021)
- Owner: Axum Capital Partners
- Number of employees: 2,200 (2021)
- Website: backyardburgers.com

Back Yard Burgers, Inc., is an American regional franchise chain of quick serve restaurants. As of September 2026, there are only 6 restaurants left, located in Mississippi, Tennessee, Florida, and Illinois. At its peak in 2007, the chain had 179 locations in 21 states. Back Yard Burgers is a subsidiary of private equity firm Axum Capital Partners, and is headquartered in Nashville, Tennessee.

Although it is the most common commercial breed in the country, the franchise's marketing tries to distinguish itself from other hamburger chains by the use of 100% Black Angus beef. Back Yard Burgers also offers salads, baked potatoes, onion rings, and other side items as optional replacements for fries in its combo meals, and also offers chicken/turkey alternatives.

== History ==
The first Back Yard Burgers restaurant opened in Cleveland, Mississippi, on March 21, 1987 by Lattimore M. Michael. The chain would begin franchising in 1988. Originally, the chain consisted of only drive-through restaurants without any dine-in facilities, but most locations would add them by the late 90's.

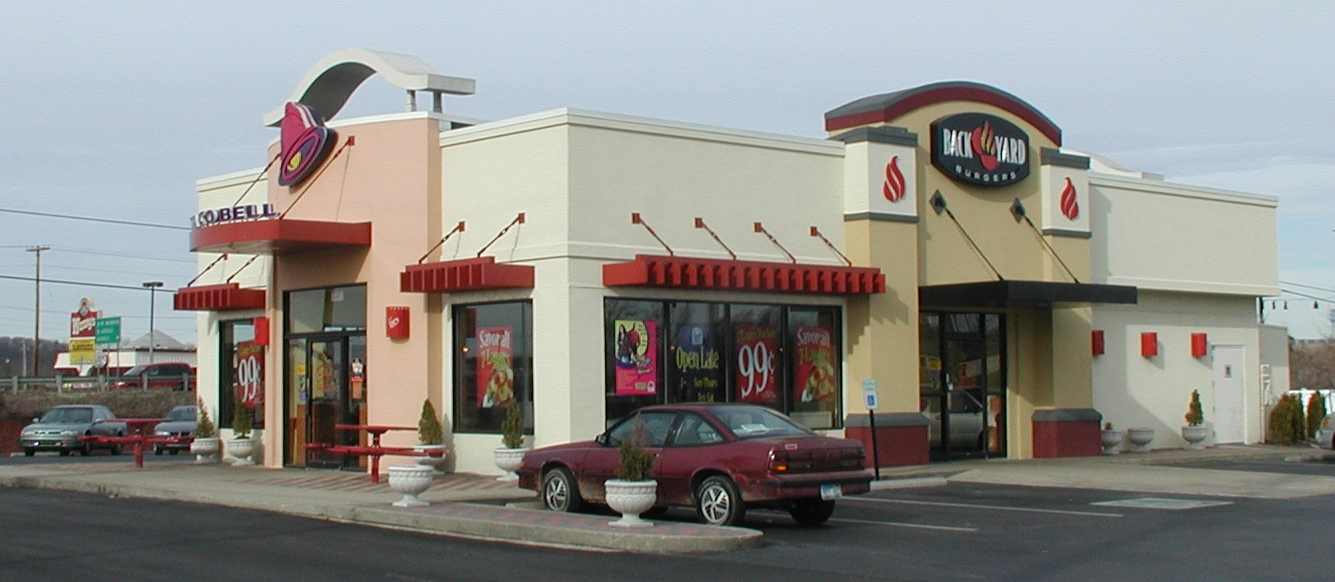
A co-branded Back Yard Burgers - Taco Bell restaurant in Shepherdsville, Kentucky, photo taken January 2003

In 2002, Back Yard Burgers and Yum! Brands, Inc., temporarily entered into a development agreement whereby Yum! had an option to co-brand Back Yard Burgers' trademarks with its other restaurants' trademarks, including Taco Bell, Pizza Hut, and KFC. In 2004, however, after Yum! chose not to exercise its option, the two companies abandoned this plan as Yum! began revitalization of the A&W brand of hamburgers and root beer.

In August 2007, the then-publicly traded company with 140 locations was purchased for US$38 million by a group of investors led by C. Stephen Lynn, the former chairman of Shoney's, who also previously served as Sonic's chief executive officer, and Reid M. Zeising of Cherokee Advisors. A significant aspect of the purchase was relocation of the company's corporate headquarters from Memphis to Nashville. In February 2009, Zeisling resigned as executive chairman of the board.

In the summer of 2012, events at the company pointed to marked internal discord. The CEO, James Boyd, was accused of physical assault by Carl Diaz during a spring 2012 senior staff meeting. Diaz was then immediately fired by the company. In September 2012, another employee, Andy Abbajay, the company's COO, also filed suit against the company, alleging he, too, was mistreated after expressing concern about Diaz's dismissal.

In October 2012, the company, headed by James Boyd as CEO, filed for Chapter 11 bankruptcy protection. The filings listed debt at about $62 million and assets around $13 million. Around the same time, Back Yard Burgers closed 22 stores in several states. Cherokee Advisors owned the "BBAC Merger Sub" used as the acquisition vehicle in the merger. Cherokee's principal investors were reported to be Reid M. Zeising, Pharos Capital Group, LLC, and C. Stephen Lynn

In January 2013, just four months after the bankruptcy filing, Back Yard Burger indicated it had received financing from its new owners, Pharos Capital, and was ready to emerge from bankruptcy, albeit with a new CEO. Neither Reid M. Zeising nor C. Stephen Lynn was mentioned as investors responsible for financing the emergence of Back Yard Burgers from bankruptcy. Back Yard Burgers appointed a new CEO, David McDougal; Michael G Webb is the CFO.

In July 2017, Axum Capital Partners "bought a controlling stake" in Back Yard Burgers from Pharos Capital Group LLC. Back Yard Burger's entity name is Tantum Companies, LLC.

In July 2018, Scott Shotter replaced David McDougal as Chief executive officer (CEO).

In May 2020, Dennis Pfaff, an industry veteran from Red Lobster and Friendly's, took over as CEO.

On September 18, 2020, Back Yard Burgers opened a new prototype store in Gastonia, North Carolina. This location closed in April 2023, and was replaced by Whataburger.

In 2022, Back Yard Burgers was named one of America's favorite brands by Newsweek.

In late July 2023, Back Yard Burgers filed for bankruptcy again and closed more restaurants. At the time of this filing, the chain reported 20 operating locations, representing a decline of 15 from the prior year. Back Yard Burgers emerged from Chapter 11 bankruptcy in December 2024.

== See also ==
- List of hamburger restaurants
