= Philip Herbert Cowell =

British astronomer (1870–1949)

Minor planets discovered: 1
4358 Lynn	5 October 1909	MPC

Philip Herbert Cowell FRS (1870 – 1949) was a British astronomer.

Philip Herbert Cowell was born in Calcutta, India on the 7 August 1870, and educated at Eton and Trinity College, Cambridge. He became second chief assistant at the Royal Greenwich Observatory in 1896 and later became the Superintendent of HM Nautical Almanac Office between 1910 and 1930. He worked on celestial mechanics, and orbits of comets and minor planets in particular. He also carefully studied the discrepancy that then existed between the theory and observation of the position of the Moon.

Cowell was elected a Fellow of the Royal Astronomical Society on 14 February 1896. On 27 October 1897 he was elected a member of the British Astronomical Association. He was also elected a Fellow of the Royal Society on 3 May 1906. In 1911 he won the Gold Medal of the Royal Astronomical Society.

In 1909, he discovered 4358 Lynn, a 10-kilometer sized main-belt asteroid and member of the Eunomia.

In 1910, for their work on Halley’s Comet Cowell and Andrew Crommelin jointly received the Prix Jules Janssen, the highest award of the Société astronomique de France, the French astronomical society and the Lindemann Prize of the Astronomische Gesellschaft.

He died in Aldeburgh, Suffolk on 6 June 1949. The main-belt asteroid 1898 Cowell is named after him.
