= Lynnville =

Lynnville may refer to:

Canada

- Lynnville, Ontario

United States

- Lynnville, Illinois
- Lynnville Township, Ogle County, Illinois
- Lynnville, Indiana
- Lynnville, Iowa
- Lynnville, Kentucky
- Lynnville, Tennessee
