= Lynn Turner =

Lynn Turner may refer to:

- Lynn Turner (model) (born 1935), American Playboy model
- Lynn Turner (murderer) (1968–2010), American convicted murderer
- Joe Lynn Turner (born 1951), American rock singer
