= Linn Township, Dent County, Missouri =

Township in Dent County, Missouri, U.S.

Coordinates: 37.549374°N 91.369748°W

Linn Township is an inactive township in Dent County, in the U.S. state of Missouri.

Linn Township was established in 1866, taking its name from the linden trees within its borders.
