= Tony Leighton =

English footballer and manager

Personal information
- Full name: Anthony Leighton
- Date of birth: 27 November 1939
- Place of birth: Leeds, England
- Date of death: 4 April 1978 (aged 38)
- Position: Striker

Senior career*
Years	Team	Apps	(Gls)
1956–1959	Leeds United	0	(0)
1959–1962	Doncaster Rovers	83	(45)
1962–1964	Barnsley	107	(59)
1964–1968	Huddersfield Town	90	(40)
1968–1970	Bradford City	88	(23)

Managerial career
- 1970–1973: Bradford Park Avenue
- * Club domestic league appearances and goals

Anthony Leighton (27 November 1939 – 4 April 1978) was a professional footballer who played as a striker for a number of Yorkshire clubs.

Born in Leeds, Leighton played for Doncaster Rovers, Barnsley, Huddersfield Town and Bradford City.

He managed Bradford Park Avenue from December 1970 until October 1973.

Leighton died of motor neurone disease on 4 April 1978, aged 38.
