= Lynn Bertholet =

Transgender Swiss bank executive, model, ÉPICÈNE co-founder, and activist

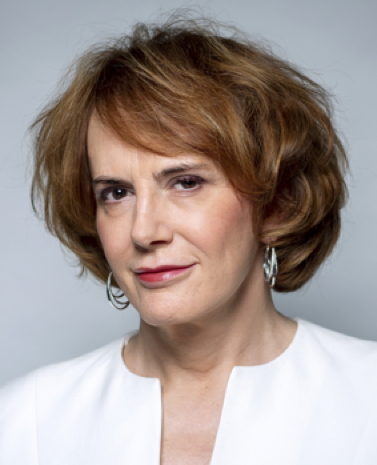
- Lynn Bertholet in 2020 © Magali Girardin
- Born: Pierre-André Bertholet; 14 July 1959 (age 66); Lausanne, originating from Rougemont
- Education: EPFL — HEC Lausanne
- Occupations: Bank executive director Photomodel
- Employers: UBS Group AG; Banque cantonale de Genève
- Known for: First transgender woman in Geneva (Switzerland) to get new identity papers even before going through surgery. Co-founder and chairperson of charity ÉPICÈNE (Switzerland).
- Notable work: TRANS*
- Website: lynn-model.com epicene.ch

Lynn Bertholet (born 14 July 1959 in Lausanne, originating from Rougemont,) is a transgender Swiss woman, bank executive and photomodel. She is also co-founder and chairperson of charity ÉPICÈNE, a volunteer public utility body which aims to welcome and support anyone facing transidentity issues.

== Biography ==
=== Childhood ===
Living since birth in the body of someone she called her “twin”, Lynn Bertholet grew up, studied and began her career under the first name Pierre-André. Her true identity appeared from early childhood with the desire to wear dresses and play with her sister's dolls. As an adolescent, she had difficulty experiencing the changes that puberty imposed on her body.

=== Studies ===
Her father wanted her to become an engineer. She thus accepted, against her will, to study two years at the École Polytechnique Fédérale de Lausanne (EPFL). However, she decided to follow her own path by enrolling at HEC Lausanne, from which she gained a Master's degree in Political Economy in 1983, which was awarded the Credit Suisse prize for the best results obtained over the entire course. Her father, upset by her new orientation, nevertheless cut her off. She therefore had to finance her studies herself by working as a cab driver during the night. In 1994, she completed her studies with a diploma in "Program for Executive" awarded by the IMD business school. In 2019, she will continue her education with a course of study—on diversity and inclusion—culminating in a certificate in "Leadership for Executive LGBT" from the Stanford Graduate School of Business.

=== Professional career ===
After graduating, she joined UBS Group AG in Geneva, then the Caisse d'Épargne located in the same city, which later merged with the Banque Hypothécaire, becoming the Banque cantonale de Genève (BCGE). She participated in the merger process by being part of the steering committee for the operation. She then continued her career at BCGE where she headed the department entitled “Affaires immobilières et entreprises de la construction” (“Real Estate and Construction Business”).

From 2002 to 2007, she taught at the Geneva School of Management and participated in the creation of the Certificate of Continuing Education in Compliance Management at the University of Geneva, a certificate which she co-directed until the end of 2006 and of which she was a member of the committee until the end of 2015. She taught in this program from 2003 to the end of 2019. From 2011 to 2020, she was deputy director of a private bank in Geneva and a member of the US Program Team. At the same time, she was also a member of the scientific committee of the Institut Supérieur de Formation Bancaire (ISFB), functions that she carried out under her true identity—Lynn Bertholet—since her transition on 19 October 2015, a key date that she has since then considered as her “second birth”.

Since 2019, she is now a member of the Board of Directors and Treasurer of Égides—Alliance internationale francophone pour l'égalité et les diversités—headquartered in Montreal and founded by the Government of Quebec.

=== ÉPICÈNE ===
She was the first transgender woman in Geneva to get new identity papers in 2015 even before going through facial surgery and chest feminization in 2017. Subsequently, after two years of relentless legal proceedings, she even managed to force her health insurance company—Groupe Mutuel—to pay the full cost of her facial reconstruction, a symbolic act that, since then, she has always considered as having represented the ultimate step in the recovery of her identity. This encouraging outcome led her to advocate for a better medical, family and social integration of transidentity, both in Switzerland and in French-speaking countries around the world.

In the same vein, her restored identity has placed her under an additional challenge, which the German-speaking Swiss newspaper Schweizer Illustrierte highlighted in its 8 March 2019 edition:

“Women face a more complex destiny than men”, says Lynn Bertholet, who was born in the wrong body and had to suffer martyrdom for more than half a century. Indeed, it was only at the age of 56 that she ultimately “dared” to show the world the face that she knew corresponded to her intimately: that of a woman. Since then, freed from her shackles, she has been engaged in an unprecedented battle succeeding to succeed in asserting herself and having her rights fully recognized with respect to her newly recovered status as a woman.

She is also working actively in favour of a facilitated official and state recognition that is no longer subject to harassing evaluations. Indeed, such exhausting procedures, according to her, would be inappropriate as they would often prove to be dangerous, discriminatory and even stigmatizing when they confront the applicant with professionals insufficiently trained in the notion of transidentity. Her personal experience and background have therefore led her to realize the extent of the harmful effects triggered by these endless wandering processes which, in her opinion, are mainly based on the incompetence of many so-called “specialists” who have been randomly mandated for this purpose. As a result, she maintains that their arbitrary conclusions and anamnestic “verdicts”, most of the time, would end up with approximate or erroneous diagnoses.

Based on the above, the association ÉPICÈNE, co-founded by Lynn Bertholet, was thus created in August 2018.

In September 2020, under her impetus and co-direction, the aforementioned institution published a work—TRANS*—whose content recounts the rehabilitating and reconstructive journey accomplished or endured by a number of personalities confronted with the archetype of transidentity.

Lynn Bertholet is also a member of the advisory commission on themes related to sexual orientation, gender identity, gender expression and sexual characteristics of the Canton of Geneva, as well as its sub-commissions on health and prevention.

== Media ==
=== TV broadcasts ===
- Darius Rochebin (24 May 2018). "Changement de sexe: interview de Lynn Bertholet, membre du comité de l'Association "360°"". 19h30 (in French). Radio télévision suisse.
- Jérémy Seydoux, Valentin Emery (28 June 2019). "Geneva Show avec Lynn Bertholet, présidente de l'association ÉPICÈNE". Geneva Show (in French). Léman bleu.
- "Lynn, transgenre et libre d'être belle". L'Illustré (in French). 5 August 2019.
- Darius Rochebin (16 December 2019). "Lynn Bertholet: "Ce sont des vies qui vont être sauvées"". 19h30 (in French). Radio télévision suisse.
- Faustine Bollaert (27 December 2019). "Ils ont caché qui ils étaient vraiment". Ça commence aujourd'hui (in French). France 2. "Vivre dans le mensonge"
- Darius Rochebin (14 June 2020). "Lynn Bertholet". Pardonnez-moi (in French). Radio télévision suisse.
- "Reliefs: Lynn Bertholet, présidente de l'association ÉPICÈNE, expose la situation des personnes transgenres". 12h45 (in French). Radio télévision suisse. 5 January 2021.
- Émilie Spierer, Dafina Gervalla, Fanny Lelong, Jochen Bechler (23 January 2021). "Trans-Identité: une rencontre avec soi-même". Faut Pas Croire (in French). Reportage télévisé suivi — à partir du minutage 10:40 — d'un débat entre Lynn Bertholet, Caroline Dayer et la journaliste Linn Levy. Production: Cyril Dépraz. Radio télévision suisse. Summary

=== Radio broadcasts ===
- "Pour la première fois, Lynn Bertholet, mannequin, rencontre le chanteur Kadebostany". Premier Rendez-vous (in French). Radio télévision suisse. 26 March 2018.
- "Si j'étais élue: Lynn Bertholet, fondatrice de l'association ÉPICÈNE". La Matinale 5h – 6h30 (in French). Radio télévision suisse. 4 March 2019.
- "Lynn Bertholet, top-modèle transgenre et… Crapaud Fou". Crapaud Fou (in French). Radio télévision suisse. 8 August 2019.
- "Lynn Bertholet: Toute une vie pour gagner son identité..." La Matinale (in French). RFJ: Radio fréquence Jura. 20 September 2019. Archived from the original on 29 January 2021. "Lynn Bertholet a été en 2015, la première femme transgenre à Genève à obtenir de nouveaux papiers d'identité avant même d'avoir subi des opérations chirurgicales."
- Bertholet, Lynn (15 November 2020). "Lynn Bertholet et Anne Carecchio se rencontrent pour la première fois". Premier Rendez-vous (in French). Radio télévision suisse.
- "TRANS*: un libro e 46 storie di resilienza". Radiotelevisione Svizzera di Lingua Italiana (in Italian). 20 January 2021. "Storie di persone transgender in Svizzera, raccolte in un libro fotografico"

== Bibliography ==
- ÉPICÈNE (2020). TRANS* (in French). Illustrated by Noura Gauper. Lausanne: Till Schaap Édition. ISBN 978-3-03878-042-7. 240 p.
- Raphaël Wahlen, Céline Brockmann, Cindy Soroken, Lynn Bertholet, Michal Yaron, Adèle Zufferey, Anne-Emmanuelle Ambresin, Arnaud Merglen (2020). "Adolescents transgenres et non binaires: approche et prise en charge par les médecins de premier recours" [Transgender and non-binary adolescents: outreach and management by primary care physicians]. Revue médicale suisse (in French). 16 (691): 789–793. doi:10.53738/REVMED.2020.16.691.0789. S2CID 246666876. Summary
- Lynn Bertholet (MSc en économie politique, HEC Lausanne; Program for Executive, IMD; présidente de l'association ÉPICÈNE), Roxane Sheybani (avocate, membre de la Commission des droits de l'homme de l'ordre des avocats de Genève, coordinatrice du groupe Égalité) (May 2019). "Quels droits pour les personnes transgenres en 2019 ?" (pdf). Anwalts — Revue de l'avocat (in French). L'Organe professionnel de la Fédération suisse des avocats: 203–208.
