= Peter Goy =

English footballer (1938–2021)

Personal information
- Full name: Peter John Goy
- Date of birth: 8 June 1938
- Place of birth: Beverley, Yorkshire, England-
- Date of death: 12 April 2021 (aged 82)
- Position: Goalkeeper

Youth career
- 1954–1955: Arsenal

Senior career*
Years	Team	Apps	(Gls)
1955–1960	Arsenal	2	(0)
1960–1964	Southend United	118	(0)
1964–1965	Watford	27	(0)
1965–1967	Huddersfield Town	4	(0)
Total		151	(0)
- * Club domestic league appearances and goals

Peter John Goy (8 June 1938 – 12 April 2021) was an English professional footballer who played as a goalkeeper.

== Career ==
Goy joined Arsenal as a member of their groundstaff in 1954, also playing for the club's youth team, and became the regular goalkeeper. He turned professional in June 1955 and continued to play for the youth team until 1956. After two years of National Service he returned to the club in 1958 and was third-choice goalkeeper after Jack Kelsey and Jim Standen. In 1958–59 he played two matches for Arsenal, his debut against Leeds United on 24 February 1959 (which Arsenal won 1–0) and the second against Birmingham City on 4 May 1959. He did not play any more matches for Arsenal and in October 1960 left the club on a free transfer.

He later played for Southend United, Watford and Huddersfield Town, before moving to South Africa, then living at Shoeburyness, Essex.
