= Linn Township, Cedar County, Missouri =

Inactive township in the US state of Missouri

Coordinates: 37.666475°N 93.853876°W

Linn Township is an inactive township in Cedar County, in the U.S. state of Missouri.

Linn Township was established in the 1840s, and named for the linden trees within its borders.
