= Linn Lake =

Lake in the state of Minnesota, United States

- Location within Minnesota
- Location: Chisago County, Minnesota
- Coordinates: 45°21′32″N 92°49′32″W
- Type: lake

Linn Lake is a lake in Chisago County, Minnesota, in the United States.

Linn Lake was named for a family who settled there.

== See also ==
- List of lakes in Minnesota
