= Mick Meagan =

Irish footballer and manager (1934–2022)

Personal information
- Full name: Michael Kevin Meagan
- Date of birth: 29 May 1934
- Place of birth: Dublin, Ireland
- Date of death: 27 November 2022 (aged 88)
- Position: Defender

Senior career*
Years	Team	Apps	(Gls)
1952–1964	Everton	165	(1)
1964–1968	Huddersfield Town	119	(1)
1968–1969	Halifax Town	23	(0)
1969–1973	Drogheda	78	(1)
1973–1974	Bray Wanderers		
1974–1976	Shamrock Rovers		(1)

International career
1961–1969	Republic of Ireland	17	(0)
1957	Republic of Ireland B	1	(0)

Managerial career
- 1969–1971: Republic of Ireland
- 1969–1973: Drogheda
- 1974–1976: Shamrock Rovers
- * Club domestic league appearances and goals

Michael Kevin Meagan (29 May 1934 – 27 November 2022) was an Irish professional footballer. He was the first manager of the Republic of Ireland national team to be given total control over selecting players.

== Early days ==
Meagan grew up in Dublin, Ireland. After appearing in a match against a Liverpool district team in Dublin, Meagan was signed by Everton in 1952.

== Shamrock Rovers ==
As well as playing for the club Mick managed the Milltown outfit from 1974 to 1976 as player manager. History was made in the FAI Cup in his last season at Rovers when he played on the same team as his son Mark who later went on to win the 1976 League of Ireland Cup and the 1978 FAI Cup . Mark's cousin Tom played for Shelbourne in the 1980s.

== International career ==
Meagan's international debut came in May 1961 when he was chosen to play in the wing half position during a World Cup qualifier against Scotland at Hampden Park. Although Ireland lost 4–1, Meagan impressed enough to be selected to play in the return game the following week at Dalymount Park.

Meagan won 17 caps for Ireland.

== International management ==
In the 1968 European Championships qualifiers, Spain again proved an insurmountable obstacle for Ireland. However, the improvements convinced the FAI that it was time to appoint a team manager and, in 1969, Mick Meagan became the first manager of the Republic of Ireland national side.

Up until then, a team of selectors picked the side. However, this new professionalism didn't have any effect, as Ireland failed to win any of their qualifiers for the 1970 World Cup. The 1970s Ireland finished bottom of their qualification group for the 1972 European Championships, ending Meagan's tenure as manager.

Meagan also managed the amateur Republic of Ireland national team in the qualifiers for the 1972 Summer Olympics.

== Personal life and death ==
Meagan died on 27 November 2022, at the age of 88.

== Honours ==
Everton

- First Division: 1962–63
- FA Charity Shield: 1963

Individual

- SWAI Personality of the Year: 1970–71

== Sources ==
Paul Doolan; Robert Goggins. The Hoops. ISBN 0-7171-2121-6.
