= Linn Township, Osage County, Missouri =

Township in Osage County, Missouri, U.S.

Coordinates: 38.543967°N 91.930739°W

Linn Township is an inactive township in Osage County, in the U.S. state of Missouri.

Linn Township was erected in 1841, taking its name from Senator Lewis F. Linn.
