= Chris Cattlin =

English footballer and manager

Personal information
- Full name: Christopher John Cattlin
- Date of birth: 25 June 1946 (age 80)
- Place of birth: Milnrow, Lancashire, England
- Height: 5 ft 11 in (1.80 m)
- Position: Defender

Senior career*
Years	Team	Apps	(Gls)
1964–1968	Huddersfield Town	61	(1)
1968–1976	Coventry City	217	(0)
1976–1979	Brighton & Hove Albion	95	(1)
- * Club domestic league appearances and goals as of 20 September 2007

Christopher John Cattlin (born 25 June 1946 in Milnrow, Lancashire) is a former professional footballer who played as a defender for Huddersfield Town, Coventry City and Brighton & Hove Albion.

He became manager of Brighton & Hove Albion on 1 October 1983, and left that position on 30 April 1986, and now runs a rock shop in the city. He also co-owns a racehorse, Ajigolo, with former Southampton and England forward Mick Channon.
