= Grace Walls Linn =

American composer and organist

Grace Walls Linn Sandy
- Born: Grace Walls Linn; August 3, 1874; Greencastle, Indiana, U.S.
- Origin: United States
- Died: August 31, 1940 (aged 66)
- Genres: Ragtime
- Occupation: Composer
- Instruments: Piano, Organ
- Label: Carlin Music Company
- Spouse(s): Edward Martin Linn (m. 1899), James Albert Sandy

Grace Walls Linn Sandy (3 August 1874 – 31 August 1940) was a ragtime composer and organist. The National Spiritualist Association of Churches made one of her compositions its official song. She published under the name Grace Walls Linn.

== Life and career ==
Linn was born in Greencastle, Indiana, to Sarah Frances Alspaugh and Charles Edward Walls. She was a direct descendant of the family of Jane Seymour, wife of Henry VIII of England. She married Edward Martin Linn in 1899. After he died in 1918, she married James Albert Sandy. Linn had one daughter, Gretchen. Little is known about her education.

Linn taught piano and was the organist at Sutherland Presbyterian Church in Indianapolis. She belonged to the Pen Woman's Club and was a Federation President of the International Travel Study Club. In 1928, the National Spiritualist Association of Churches made Linn's "Sunflower Song" the organization's official song. Linn spent the last year of her life in Florida with her daughter.

The Carlin Music Company published Linn's music. She composed at least 14 piano pieces and five songs.

== Selected works ==
=== Piano ===
- Automobile Spin
- Dancing Shadows Gavotte
- Enchantment Waltz
- Gretchen’s Dance
- La Grace
- Memories of the Dance
- Sunbeam Gavotte
- Tippecanoe Two Step

=== Vocals ===
- “Shut Eye Land Lullaby” (music and text by Linn)
- “Sunflower Song” (music and text by Linn)
- “You Has Still Got Me” (text traditional)
