= Lynn Amowitz =

American physician and human rights investigator

Lynn Amowitz is an American physician and investigator for Physicians for Human Rights working to highlight human rights abuses and violence against women in conflict-affected countries. She has worked in countries as diverse as Rwanda, Kosovo, Afghanistan, Iraq, Nigeria, Pakistan, and Sierra Leone.

== Early life ==
Amowitz was born to Jewish parents in North Carolina, in one of the few Jewish families in her community. She experienced antisemitic harassment during school and grew up hearing of her grandparents' struggles with antisemitism in Eastern Europe. From an early age, she had a desire to help people, even repeatedly trying to give her coat to a classmate who she perceived needed it more.

== Schooling ==
Amowitz received her medical degree from the Brody School of Medicine at East Carolina University in 1992 where her father, Dr. Edward Lieberman, was a professor of physiology. Her medical specialties include internal medicine, women's health, and epidemiology. She completed her residency in Africa.

== Career ==
After completing her residency, Amowitz returned to Africa to work with rural refugee communities in Rwanda and the Democratic Republic of Congo. She did similar work with refugee communities in Albania. These experiences prompted her to seek out solutions to the underlying causes of conflict, and not just its medical ramifications. This effort led to her work with Physicians for Human Rights. Since joining Physicians for Human Rights, she has chronicled human rights abuses perpetrated against southern Iraqis by Saddam Hussein and met with the Taliban in Afghanistan to discuss women's health concerns. She has worked in Rwanda, Kosovo, Afghanistan, Iraq, Nigeria, Pakistan, the DRC, Sierra Leone, and other countries.

She also holds an appointment with the Brigham and Women’s Hospital, a Harvard University hospital, in Boston.
