= Ray Veall =

English footballer

Personal information
- Full name: Raymond Joseph Veall
- Date of birth: 16 March 1943 (age 83)
- Place of birth: Skegness, England
- Position: Left wing

Senior career*
Years	Team	Apps	(Gls)
1960–1961	Skegness Town		
1961	Doncaster Rovers	19	(6)
1961–1965	Everton	11	(1)
1965	Preston North End	11	(0)
1965–1968	Huddersfield Town	12	(1)
1968	Los Angeles Wolves	31	(4)
1971	Maritzburg	14	(4)
1972–1974	Gisborne City		
- * Club domestic league appearances and goals

Raymond Joseph "Ray" Veall (born 16 March 1943) is an English former professional footballer who played as a left winger for Doncaster Rovers, Everton, Preston North End and Huddersfield Town in the Football League during the 1960s. He also played for the Los Angeles Wolves in the North American Soccer League.
