= C. Stephen Lynn =

American businessman

- Education: Tennessee Technological University
- Occupation: Businessman
- Spouse: Milah P. Lynn

C. Stephen Lynn is an American businessman from Tennessee. He spent the bulk of his career in the fast food industry, as the chairman and CEO of Sonic Corporation from 1983 to 1995, chairman and CEO of Shoney's from 1995 to 1998, and CEO of Back Yard Burgers from 2007 to 2010. Lynn is CEO of GGR Enterprises, a motorsports marketing enterprises headquarter in North Carolina.

== Early life ==
C. Stephen Lynn graduated from the Tennessee Technological University. He received an M.B.A. from the University of Louisville.

== Career ==
Lynn has spent most of his career as a businessman in the fast food industry. He was the director of distribution for Kentucky Fried Chicken from 1973 to 1978. He was the chairman and chief executive officer of the Sonic Corporation from 1983 to 1995, and of Shoney's from 1995 to 1998.

Lynn was the chairman of Cummins, an engine corporation, from 1999 to 2011. He returned to the fast food industry, as the chief executive officer of Back Yard Burgers from 2007 to 2010. In 2012, he founded RP3, a merger and acquisition firm in the fast food industry. He was its managing partner. He is on the board of directors of Krispy Kreme.

== Philanthropy ==
He is on the board of directors of the National Cowboy & Western Heritage Museum in Oklahoma City, Oklahoma. He is on the board of directors of the Tennessee Tech University Foundation. He is on the Christian Business Leaders Roundtable.

In 2013, he co-chaired the Tennessee Waltz with his wife at the Tennessee State Capitol, hosted by Tennessee Governor Bill Haslam.

== Personal life ==
He is married to Milah P. Lynn. They reside in Belle Meade, Tennessee, near Nashville.
