= Stevie Lynn =

Personal information
- Born: 1 August 1983 (age 42) Teesside

Professional wrestling career
- Ring name: Stevie Lynn
- Billed height: 6 ft 1 in (185 cm)
- Billed weight: 190 lb (86 kg)
- Trained by: Iceman, Tony Spitfire, General Trent Steel
- Debut: 2003

Stevie Lynn is a Northeast-based English professional wrestler who competes with many independent promotions within the United Kingdom and Europe. Outside of wrestling Lynn processes mortgages as a living.

== Wrestling career ==
Steve Lynn started his professional wrestling career in 2002, learning and then wrestling for Wrestle Zone Wrestling (wZw), based in Newcastle. Later, however; Stevie Lynn started wrestling mainly for 3 Count Wrestling (3CW), based around Middlesbrough and Billingham. Lynn was also known to compete occasionally for Frontier Wrestling Alliance (FWA), Westside Xtreme Wrestling (wXw) and 1 Pro Wrestling (1PW).

Stevie Lynn debuted in 3CW during "Rivertown Riot" in May 2004, in a losing effort to Anthony McIntyre. Lynn would go on to form the tag team LDT (Live or Die Trying) with "Dragon Aisu" Ice XVII. The two men would later feud which saw Lynn defeat Ice XVII at "Tiger in the Tower" in a 28-minute matchup to win 3CW's Heavyweight title. However, Lynn's first reign was short lived as Ice XVII regained the gold on 10 June in a classic Iron Man match.

Stevie Lynn would go on to win the title for a second time before losing it at a "3CW Vs FWA:A" event, where Doug Williams would walk out with the title.

In 2006 Stevie announced his retirement from the wrestling world, to concentrate on his University Degree course. He made some surprise appearances for 3CW, but stated that he had definitely retired from wrestling.

More recently, Stevie Lynn has returned to 3 Count Wrestling, now wrestling out of Gateshead, and part of the "3 Count Mafia" along with Dragon Aisu, Chris Whitton, Anthony McIntyre, GBH and others.

== Championships and accomplishments ==
- 3 Count Wrestling

- 3CW Heavyweight Champion (2 times)

- Wrestle Zone Wrestling

- wZw Zero-G Championship (1 time)
- wZw Babyface of the Year 2004
