= Fred Lynn (politician) =

American politician

Member of the U.S. House of Representatives from Missouri's 148th district

Missouri House of Representatives

Personal details
- Born: 1924 Vera Cruz, Missouri
- Died: 2012 (aged 87–88)
- Resting place: Greenlawn Memorial Gardens in Greene County, Missouri
- Party: Democratic
- Spouse(s): Opal Trantham; Duna Beshears
- Children: 2 daughters
- Occupation: pastor, radio broadcaster

Fred Lowell Lynn (March 8, 1924 – March 31, 2012) was a Democratic politician who served in the Missouri House of Representatives during the 1970s and 1980s representing northern Springfield, Missouri. He was born in Vera Cruz, Missouri and was educated in Huffman Elementary School in Douglas County, Nixa Public High School, Draughon's Business University, ABC Radio School in Seattle, and Bible College. On June 30, 1945, he married Opal Trantham in Springfield, Missouri. Some of the radio stations where he worked include KGBX, KCMO, KWTO, KWFC, and KLFJ.
