= William Henry Lynn =

British architect (1829–1915)

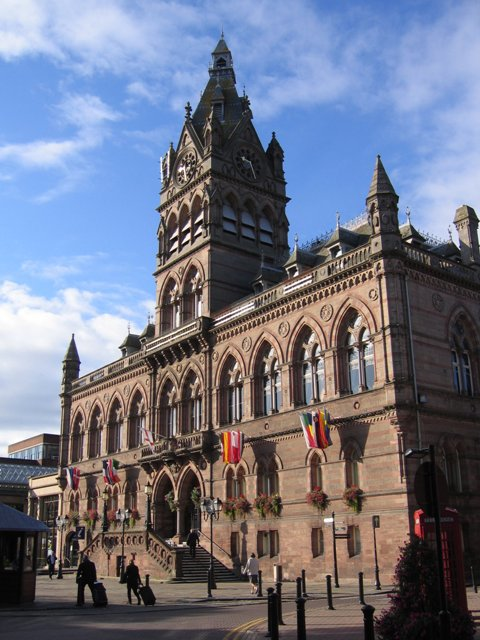
Chester Town Hall (1863–69), designed by Lynn

William Henry Lynn (1829–1915) was an Irish-born architect with a practice in Belfast and the north of England. He is noted for his Ruskinian Venetian Gothic public buildings, which include Chester Town Hall (completed 1869) and Barrow-in-Furness Town Hall (completed 1886).

== Career ==
In 1846 Lynn was articled to Sir Charles Lanyon in Belfast; under Lanyon he prepared the drawings for the original building housing Queens College, Belfast. He and Lanyon formed a partnership in 1854; in 1860, with Charles' son John Lanyon as junior partner, they incorporated as Lanyon, Lynn and Lanyon. The partnership dissolved in 1872, when Lynn struck out on his own.

For their first joint projects (1855), Lynn and the elder Lanyon produced bank buildings at Newtownards, County Down, and at Dungannon, County Tyrone, which are two of the earliest Irish examples of the Venetian Gothic style that was being championed by John Ruskin. In Belfast the firm produced urbane Italianate commercial structures, in Dublin, the Church of St Andrew (1860) and the Unitarian Church, St Stephen's Green was "justly described as the best example extant of a modern Gothic church on a narrow street frontage, the treatment being quite original and altogether admirable". In Jordanstown, Co. Antrim, they designed the Romanesque Revival Church of St Patrick (1865–8) and, in England, the Chester Town Hall, following a public competition (1863–9), should be mentioned. In the 1860s a second Shane's Castle was designed with Charles Lanyon for 1st Lord O'Neill (burned 1922), and in 1870 Castle Leslie was designed for Sir John Leslie, 1st Baronet.

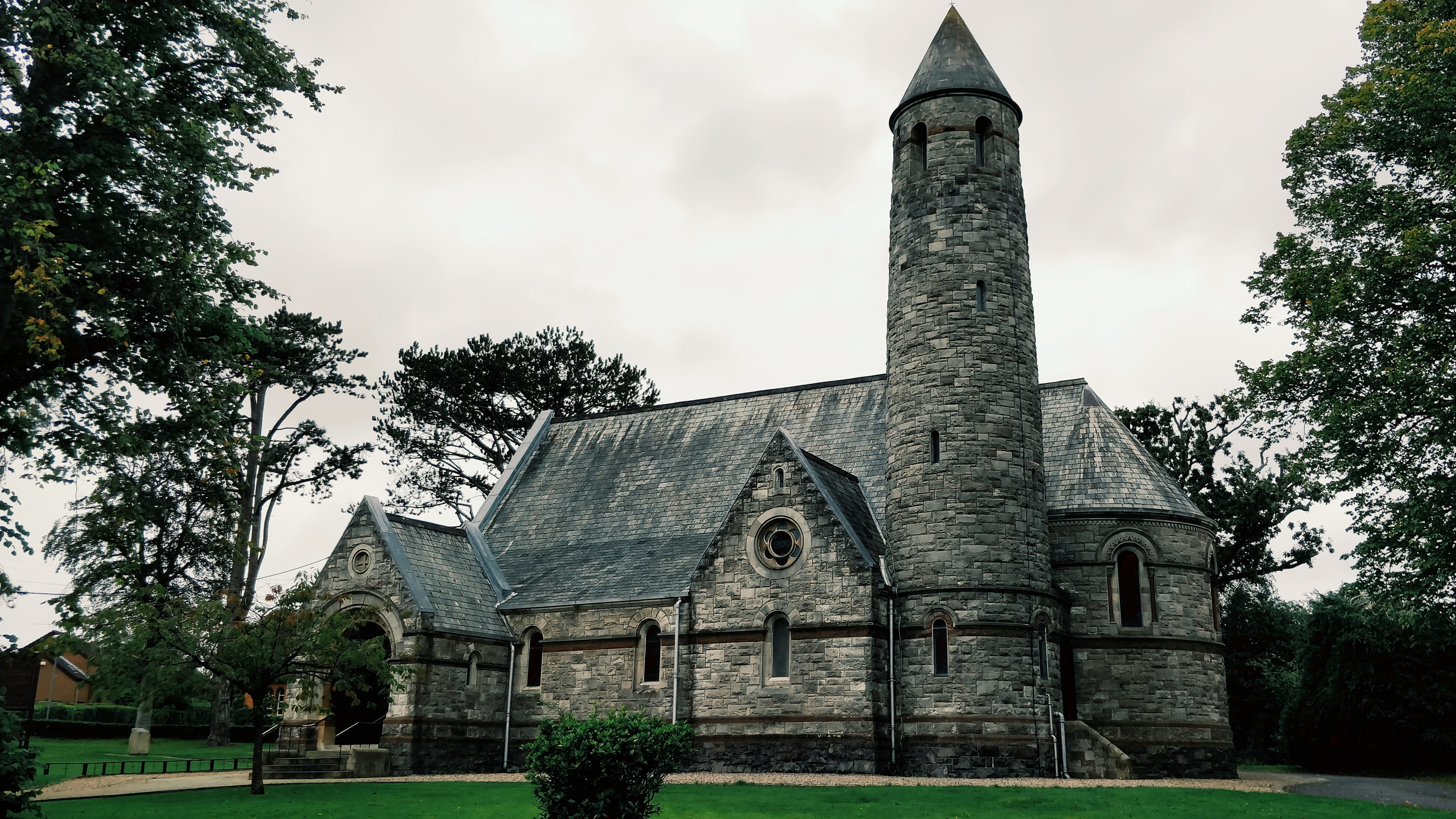
Church Of St Patrick, Jordanstown

A project that was never realised was the remodelling and expansion of Clandeboye House for the young Lord Dufferin and Claneboye, though correspondence continued over three decades, concerning the plans but also ranging over a projected new house at Grey Point; a seaside resort at Helen's Bay; a water tank to be sited below Helen's Tower; and projects in Canada, where Lord Dufferin was Governor General. A letter from Lynn to Lord Dufferin in March 1869 referring to alterations then under way at Clandeboye, some interior alterations of the time were designed by Lynn, perhaps in the dining-room, drawing-room, library and gallery.

Among Lynn's most prominent designs working on his own were his work at Queen's University, Belfast, the Carlisle Memorial Methodist Church, Carlisle Circus, Belfast (1872–5; now semi-derelict and being restored) and the Ruskinian "Venetian" Gothic Belfast Bank on College Green, Dublin (1892), now housing a grand pub. Among his other later public commissions in Belfast were the Central Library (1883–8), the Bank Buildings (1895–1900), and Campbell College (1891–4). Lynn was commissioned (1888–90) by the distiller, James Bruce, to design Benburb Manor (now Benburb Priory) in Co Tyrone. In part on the success of the Chester Town Hall he was commissioned to produce designs for Paisley Town Hall in Scotland (1875–82), and Barrow-in-Furness Town Hall in Cumbria (previously North Lancashire) (1882–87), as well as the extension (1891–95) to the Italianate Harbour Office, Belfast.

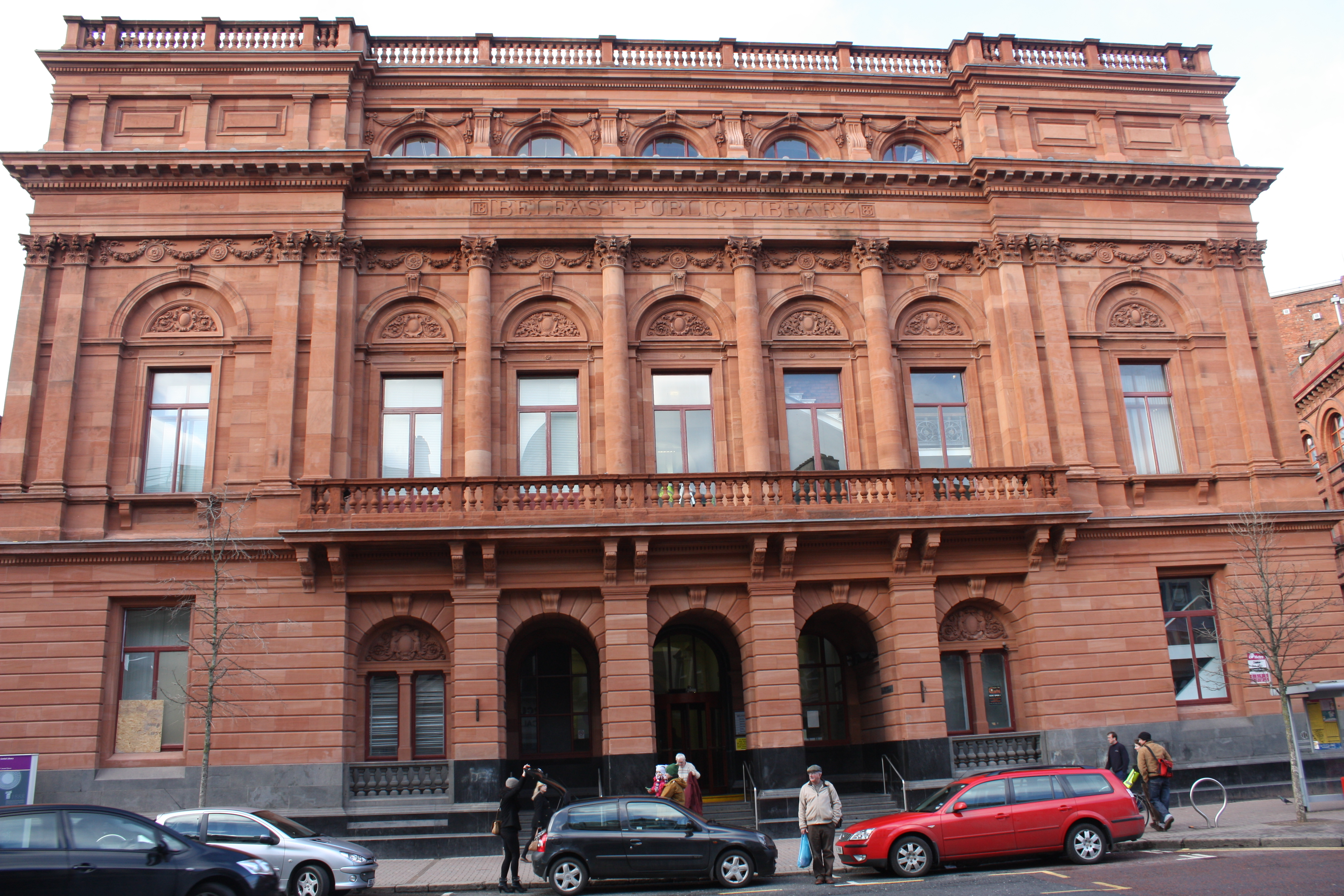
Belfast Central Library, January 2011 (01)

One of his last designs was for the baptistry of St Anne's Cathedral, Belfast in 1915. He died that same year and is buried in Belfast City Cemetery.

Lynn served as president of the Royal Institute of the Architects of Ireland from 1886 to 1889.
