= Jenny Lynn (photographer) =

American photographer

Jenny Lynn (born 1953, Tampa, Florida), is an American photographer. She works and lives in Philadelphia, Pennsylvania.

== Formative years ==
Born in Tampa, Florida in 1953, Lynn was raised near Philadelphia, Pennsylvania. Lynn studied painting and photography at the Tyler School of Art and Architecture at Temple University in Philadelphia from 1972 to 1976, graduating with a Bachelor of Fine Arts degree, cum laude. She then enrolled in the filmmaking program at the New York University Graduate School of Film and Television, and received further training there from 1977 to 1978.

== Career ==
Following her studies at New York University, Lynn worked as a freelance designer and photographer in New York City prior to relocating to Santa Barbara, California, where she continued her artistic endeavors before feeling the need to return to the East Coast. "There wasn't enough grit in Santa Barbara.... It's idyllic for a vacation, but all my roots are here, and my clients, too." She subsequently opted to settle again in Philadelphia, where she found an apartment and set up a studio in the city's Old City section. She has also worked as a master lecturer at Philadelphia's University of the Arts.

Lynn's 2004 book, PhotoPlay, features photographs, collages and photograms from thirty years of work. The book's introduction is by novelist and editor Richard Burgin. Photography curator Virginia Heckert wrote the book's essay. Her work has also appeared in Photo District News, Zoom International magazine, The New Yorker, Glamour, Mademoiselle, and other publications.

One of her best-known pieces is the advertisement which first appeared in 1994, "Absolut Lynn." The ad was part of the "Absolut Artists" series of advertisements for Absolut Vodka.

Lynn's one-person show, "The Object Is Art," was exhibited in 2008 at New York's Katonah Museum of Art.

Her public art projects include "Dreams In Transit," a ten-foot-by-thirty-foot, permanent photographic installation at New Jersey Transit's 9th Street Station, in Hoboken, NJ.

Lynn conceived and edited a fall of 2015 book, "EyeBook: Sixty Artists. One Subject." The book, an anthology, focuses upon the eye in art, and is published by Damiani Editore, of Bologna, Italy.

== Collections ==
- Philadelphia Museum of Art
- Center for Creative Photography, Arizona
