= William Linn (soldier) =

William Linn (died March 6, 1836) is believed to have participated in the Battle of the Alamo, in present-day Texas, United States, February 23 – March 6, 1836, on the Texan side.

Linn resided in Boston, Massachusetts before eventually moving New Orleans and then travelling to Texas as a member of Capt. Thomas H. Breece's company of the New Orleans Greys. In Texas, Linn took part in the siege of Bexar, and is listed on the roster of Lt. Col. James C. Neill's Bexar garrison as having been taken prisoner. This possibly occurred during Siege of Bexar and then Linn may have been released. Linn purportedly served in the Alamo as a member of Capt. William Blazeby's infantry company, and likely died on March 6, 1836, in the Battle of the Alamo.

== See also ==
- List of Alamo defenders

== Sources ==
- Daughters of the American Revolution, The Alamo Heroes and Their Revolutionary Ancestors (San Antonio, 1976). Daughters of the Republic of Texas, Muster Rolls of the Texas Revolution (Austin, 1986). Bill Groneman, Alamo Defenders (Austin: Eakin, 1990).
