= Laurence Lynn Jr. =

Laurence E. Lynn Jr. (June 10, 1937 – January 1, 2023) was the Sid Richardson Research Professor at the Lyndon B. Johnson School of Public Affairs, University of Texas at Austin and Professor of Public Management at the University of Manchester's Business School. From 2002 to 2007, he was the George H. W. Bush Chair and Professor of Public Affairs at the George Bush School of Government and Public Service, Texas A&M University.

He is sometimes referred to as the "Godfather of Public Management", as his contributions to academia and publications are often cited.

Lynn received an AB in economics from the University of California, Berkeley, and a Ph.D. in economics from Yale University.

In 1975, Lynn served as a consultant to the Murphy Commission, which reviewed the formulation of U.S. foreign policy, and suggested improvements.

Lynn is also the Sydney Stein Jr., Professor of Public Management Emeritus in the Harris Graduate School of Public Policy Studies and the School of Social Service Administration (SSA) at the University of Chicago, where he was a member of the faculty from 1983 until 2002 and Dean of SSA from 1983 until 1988.

Lynn is a former professor of public policy and chairman of the Public Policy Program at Harvard University's John F. Kennedy School of Government. He has also served on the faculty of the Business School at Stanford University.

He has served as a deputy assistant secretary of defense; director of program analysis at the U.S. National Security Council; assistant secretary, Department of Health, Education and Welfare; and assistant secretary, Department of the Interior. Lynn was also elected as a fellow of the National Academy of Public Administration.

His most recent book, co-authored with Carolyn J. Hill of Georgetown University's Public Policy Institute, is a textbook, Public Management: A Three-Dimensional Approach, published in 2008.

Lynn died on January 1, 2023, at the age of 85.

== Publications ==
- The State and Human Services
- Designing Public Policy
- Managing the Public's Business
- Managing Public Policy
- Public Management as Art, Science, and Profession
- Public Management: Old and New
- An Iberian Trilogy and Other Stories
