= Lyn (surname) =

Lyn is a surname. Notable people with the name include:

- Anthony Lyn (born 1965), Welsh theatrical director and actor
- Brian Lyn (born 1961), Antiguan cyclist
- David Lyn (1927-2012), Welsh actor and director
- Dawn Lyn (born 1963), American child actress
- Euros Lyn, Welsh director for television
- George Lyn, Jamaican politician
- Jacquie Lyn (1928–2002), British-born American child actress
- Keon Lyn (born 1992), American football player
- Lisa Lyn (born 1964), Canadian field hockey player
- Nicole Lyn (born 1978), Canadian television actress
- Robbie Lyn (born 1951), Jamaican musician

== See also ==
- Lyn (given name)
- Lin (surname)
- Lynn (surname)
