= David Joy (footballer) =

English footballer

Personal information
- Full name: David Frederick Joy
- Date of birth: 23 September 1943 (age 83)
- Place of birth: Barnard Castle, County Durham, England
- Position: Defender

Senior career*
Years	Team	Apps	(Gls)
- Evenwood Town
1965–1966	Huddersfield Town	1	(0)
1967–1968	York City	15	(0)
- * Club domestic league appearances and goals

David Frederick Joy (born 23 September 1943) is a former professional footballer who played for Huddersfield Town and York City.
