= Llyn (given name) =

Llyn is a unisex given name originating from the Welsh word llyn meaning "lake" or "loch."

== People with the name ==
- Llyn Foulkes (1934–2025), American artist
