= Lynn Township =

Lynn Township may refer to:

- Lynn Township, Henry County, Illinois
- Lynn Township, Knox County, Illinois
- Lynn Township, Posey County, Indiana
- Lynn Township, Sioux County, Iowa
- Lynn Township, Michigan
- Lynn Township, McLeod County, Minnesota
- Lynn Township, Clay County, Nebraska
- Lynn Township, Wells County, North Dakota, in Wells County, North Dakota
- Lynn Township, Hardin County, Ohio
- Lynn Township, Pennsylvania, in Lehigh County
- Lynn Township, Day County, South Dakota, in Day County, South Dakota
- Lynn Township, Lincoln County, South Dakota, in Lincoln County, South Dakota
- Lynn Township, Moody County, South Dakota, in Moody County, South Dakota
