= William Thynne Lynn =

- Born: August 9, 1835; London, England
- Died: December 11, 1911 (aged 76); Blackheath, London
- Resting place: Lee cemetery
- Education: B. A., University of London
- Scientific career
- Fields: Astronomy
- Workplaces: Greenwich Observatory

William Thynne Lynn (9 August 1835 – 11 December 1911) was an English astronomer and author.

== Biography ==
He was born at his family's home on Sloane Street in London, England, the eldest son of William Bewicke Lynn and Ellen née Thynne. His father had served in the 5th Fusiliers as a surgeon during the Peninsula War, then with the Allied troops that occupied Paris following the Waterloo campaign, before becoming senior surgeon at Westminster Hospital. The young William spent his youth in Claygate, Surrey, where his father would retire from service. Lynn received a private education in Esher, Surrey.

In April 1854, Lynn gained a position as a supernumerary computer at the Royal Observatory, Greenwich. The following year, the Astronomer Royal, George Biddell Airy, recommended him as an assistant at Cambridge Observatory, under the direction of James Challis. After eighteen months, he returned to Greenwich and was appointed assistant in September 1856, reducing meridian zenith-distance observations. Following the death of H. Bean in 1859, Lynn was named superintendent of supernumerary computers, working on the annual volume, Greenwich Observations.

While employed at Cambridge, Lynn found time for private study. He was educated at King's College in London. Lynn graduated with a B.A. from the University of London in October 1861, after passing the required exams in 1860 and 1861. He was elected an associate of King's College in 1862. On 14 February 1862 he was elected a fellow of the Royal Astronomical Society. At Greenwich, Lynn was named second class assistant in 1871, then first class assistant in 1875.

In 1880, he retired from the Royal Observatory due to poor health perpurtedly brought on by constant exposure to the nighttime conditions. He was granted a pension by the Admiralty. Following this, he was admitted as a lay reader at the Rochester diocese. In 1884, he published a work titled Celestial Motions: a Handy Book of Astronomy, which proved popular and went through multiple editions. The 9th edition would provide the foundation for a larger volume titled Stars and Telescopes by David P. Todd. Lynn wrote on other topics in astronomy and Christian religion, including numerous short notes on astronomy published in The Observatory. He joined the British Astronomical Association in 1900, and contributed papers to its journal.

After a stroke, Lynn died 11 December 1911. He was survived by two sisters. (4358) Lynn, a minor planet discovered in 1909, was named in his memory.

== Bibliography ==
Lynn published several works:

- The First Principles of Natural Philosophy (1863)
- Celestial Motions: a Handy Book of Astronomy (1884)
- Bible Chronology: Brief Lessons on the Parables and Miracles of Our Lord (1889)
- Eminent Scripture Characters (1891)
- Short Catechisms of English Church History (1892)
- Brief Lessons on Astronomy (1893)
- Remarkable Comets (1893)
- Remarkable Eclipses (1896)
- Astronomy for the Young (1898)
- The Penny Chronology (1902)
- Studies in the New Testament, Expository and Practical (1909)
