= Billy Lynn =

English footballer

Personal information
- Full name: William Lynn
- Date of birth: 20 January 1947
- Place of birth: Newcastle upon Tyne, England
- Date of death: July 2014 (aged 67)
- Place of death: Gateshead, England
- Position: Winger

Senior career*
Years	Team	Apps	(Gls)
1965–1967	Huddersfield Town	4	(0)
1967–19??	Rotherham United	0	(0)
- * Club domestic league appearances and goals

William Lynn (20 January 1947 – July 2014) was an English professional footballer who played as a winger for Huddersfield Town and Rotherham United. He was born in Newcastle upon Tyne.
