= 1974–75 Huddersfield Town A.F.C. season =

Huddersfield Town
1974–75 season
- Chairman: Stanley Kinder; Keith Longbottom
- Manager: Bobby Collins
- Stadium: Leeds Road
- Football League Third Division: 24th (relegated)
- FA Cup: First round (eliminated by Grimsby Town)
- Football League Cup: Second round (eliminated by Leeds United)
- Top goalscorer: League: Alan Gowling (17); All: Alan Gowling (19)
- Highest home attendance: 15,013 vs Leeds United (10 September 1974)
- Lowest home attendance: 2,455 vs Aldershot (22 April 1975)
- Biggest win: 4–1 vs Southend United (4 March 1975)
- Biggest defeat: 0–4 vs Preston North End (30 November 1974); 0–4 vs Port Vale (14 December 1974)
Home colours

Huddersfield Town's 1974–75 campaign saw Town relegated to the 4th Division for the first time in the club's history. Following Ian Greaves' resignation at the end of the previous season, Bobby Collins took charge at Leeds Road, but could not stop Town's alarming slide to Division 4. Town finished bottom of the table, 6 points from safety and 5 points from 2nd bottom team Watford.

== Squad at the start of the season ==
Note: Flags indicate national team as defined under FIFA eligibility rules; some limited exceptions apply. Players may hold more than one non-FIFA nationality.

Pos.	Nation	Player
GK	ENG	Terry Poole
GK	ENG	Dick Taylor
DF	ENG	Roy Ellam
DF	ENG	Paul Garner
DF	ENG	Peter Hart
DF	ENG	Geoff Hutt
DF	ENG	Brian Marshall
DF	ENG	Grahame McGifford
DF	ENG	John Saunders
MF	ENG	Les Chapman
MF	ENG	Terry Dolan
MF	ENG	Martin Fowler
MF	ENG	Bobby Hoy

Pos.	Nation	Player
MF	ENG	Lloyd Maitland
MF	ENG	Graham Pugh
MF	ENG	Steve Smith
MF	ENG	Steve Spriggs
FW	ENG	John Dungworth
FW	IRL	Mick Fairclough
FW	ENG	Franny Firth
FW	ENG	Alan Gowling
FW	ENG	Terry Gray
FW	ENG	Jimmy Lawson
FW	ENG	Bob Newton
FW	ENG	Phil Summerill

== Review ==
Following Ian Greaves' resignation at the end of the previous season, Town hired ex-Leeds United player and Scotland international Bobby Collins in his first managerial post. Following mid-table mediocrity the previous season, Town were hoping for a good start to mount a serious promotion challenge. But the start of the season saw Town lose 6 of their opening 8 league games. They then went on a 6-match unbeaten run, but that would be as good as it got for Town for the rest of the season. Even the 17 goals of Alan Gowling, the top scorer from the previous 2 seasons could not help Town's alarming slide.

In January 1975, ex-manager Tom Johnston was brought in as General Manager to help his fellow countryman, but even he could not change Town's fortunes as the team only won 4 out of their 22 games in 1975. Therefore, Town got relegated to Division 4 for the first time in their history. They also became the first team to win the 1st Division and play in the bottom tier of the Football League. They finished 24th with only 32 points, 5 behind Watford and Tranmere Rovers. 33 different players were used during the season, a record that would stand until the 1996–97 season.

== Squad at the end of the season ==
Note: Flags indicate national team as defined under FIFA eligibility rules; some limited exceptions apply. Players may hold more than one non-FIFA nationality.

Pos.	Nation	Player
GK	ENG	Terry Poole
GK	ENG	Dick Taylor
DF	ENG	Paul Garner
DF	ENG	Peter Hart
DF	ENG	Geoff Hutt
DF	ENG	Brian Marshall
DF	ENG	Grahame McGifford
DF	ENG	John Saunders
MF	ENG	Les Chapman
MF	ENG	Terry Dolan
MF	ENG	Martin Fowler
MF	ENG	Bobby Hoy
MF	ENG	Lloyd Maitland

Pos.	Nation	Player
MF	ENG	Brian O'Neil
MF	ENG	Steve Smith
MF	ENG	Steve Spriggs
FW	ENG	John Dungworth
FW	ENG	Barry Endean
FW	IRL	Mick Fairclough
FW	ENG	Franny Firth
FW	ENG	Colin Garwood
FW	ENG	Alan Gowling
FW	ENG	Terry Gray
FW	ENG	Jimmy Lawson
FW	SCO	Billy McGinley
FW	ENG	Bob Newton

== Results ==
=== Division Three ===
Date	Opponents	Home/ Away	Result F–A	Scorers	Attendance	Position
17 August 1974	Peterborough United	H	1–2	Summerill	7,334	17th
24 August 1974	Aldershot	A	0–1		3,909	23rd
31 August 1974	Watford	H	3–1	Chapman, Hoy, Dolan	5,007	15th
7 September 1974	Charlton Athletic	A	0–1		6,551	23rd
14 September 1974	Chesterfield	H	2–0	Hoy (2)	5,962	16th
21 September 1974	Bury	A	0–3		5,956	22nd
28 September 1974	Crystal Palace	H	0–1		6,524	23rd
1 October 1974	Plymouth Argyle	A	0–2		5,324	23rd
5 October 1974	Grimsby Town	A	2–1	Gowling, MacLeod	4,901	24th
12 October 1974	Brighton & Hove Albion	H	1–0	Garner	6,544	21st
19 October 1974	Tranmere Rovers	A	2–1	Gray, Gowling	2,833	21st
22 October 1974	Wrexham	H	0–0		5,873	20th
26 October 1974	Swindon Town	H	2–2	Gowling (2)	5,792	19th
2 November 1974	Hereford United	A	1–1	Gowling	7,471	19th
4 November 1974	Wrexham	A	0–3		4,777	19th
9 November 1974	Colchester United	H	3–2	Gowling (pen), Gray, Dolan	5,233	17th
16 November 1974	Halifax Town	A	1–2	Ellam	6,827	19th
30 November 1974	Preston North End	A	0–4		7,958	22nd
3 December 1974	Bournemouth	H	2–2	McGinley, Lawson	3,804	21st
7 December 1974	Gillingham	H	0–2		4,761	21st
14 December 1974	Port Vale	A	0–4		3,986	22nd
21 December 1974	Walsall	H	3–2	Gowling (3)	3,627	19th
26 December 1974	Chesterfield	A	0–3		4,593	23rd
28 December 1974	Blackburn Rovers	H	1–2	O'Neil	8,122	23rd
4 January 1975	Bournemouth	A	1–1	O'Neil	5,078	22nd
11 January 1975	Gillingham	A	2–3	Garwood (2)	7,960	23rd
18 January 1975	Preston North End	H	0–1		7,654	23rd
1 February 1975	Colchester United	A	2–3	Gowling (2 pens)	3,921	24th
8 February 1975	Hereford United	H	2–1	Fowler, Lawson	4,893	24th
15 February 1975	Southend United	A	0–1		4,316	24th
22 February 1975	Halifax Town	H	1–2	Gowling (pen)	7,931	24th
28 February 1975	Watford	A	0–1		4,345	24th
4 March 1975	Southend United	H	4–1	Gowling, Maitland, Ellam, Belfitt	4,538	24th
8 March 1975	Port Vale	H	3–1	Garner, Gowling (pen), Dolan	6,705	23rd
15 March 1975	Crystal Palace	A	1–1	Lawson	15,043	23rd
19 March 1975	Peterborough United	A	1–2	Endean	4,894	23rd
22 March 1975	Charlton Athletic	H	1–3	Belfitt	6,546	23rd
28 March 1975	Blackburn Rovers	A	1–1	Dolan	16,746	24th
29 March 1975	Walsall	A	0–2		4,140	24th
1 April 1975	Bury	H	0–0		5,666	23rd
5 April 1975	Swindon Town	A	1–4	Gray	7,009	23rd
8 April 1975	Plymouth Argyle	H	0–2		2,947	23rd
12 April 1975	Grimsby Town	H	1–0	Gowling	3,961	24th
19 April 1975	Brighton & Hove Albion	A	0–2		10,822	24th
22 April 1975	Aldershot	H	2–2	Gowling (2)	2,455	24th
26 April 1975	Tranmere Rovers	H	0–0		2,960	24th

=== FA Cup ===
Date	Round	Opponents	Home/ Away	Result F–A	Scorers	Attendance
23 November 1974	Round 1	Grimsby Town	A	0–1		5,541

=== Football League Cup ===
Date	Round	Opponents	Home/ Away	Result F–A	Scorers	Attendance
21 August 1974	Round 1	York City	A	2–0	Saunders, Summerill	5,570
10 September 1974	Round 2	Leeds United	H	1–1	Gowling	15,013
24 September 1974	Round 2 Replay	Leeds United	A	1–1	Gowling	18,496
7 October 1974	Round 2 2nd Replay	Leeds United	A	1–2	McGinley	14,599

== Appearances and goals ==
Name	Nationality	Position	League		FA Cup		League Cup		Total	
Name	Nationality	Position	Apps	Goals	Apps	Goals	Apps	Goals	Apps	Goals
Rod Belfitt	England	FW	6	2	0	0	0	0	6	2
Les Chapman	England	MF	15	1	1	0	4	0	20	1
Terry Dolan	England	MF	46	4	1	0	4	0	51	4
John Dungworth	England	FW	4	0	0	0	0	0	4	0
Roy Ellam	England	DF	18	2	1	0	2	0	21	2
Barry Endean	England	MF	6 (2)	1	0	0	0	0	6 (2)	1
Mick Fairclough	Republic of Ireland	FW	3 (1)	0	0	0	0	0	3 (1)	0
Franny Firth	England	FW	1	0	0	0	0	0	1	0
Martin Fowler	England	MF	14 (2)	1	0	0	0	0	14 (2)	1
Paul Garner	England	DF	35	2	0	0	4	0	39	2
Colin Garwood	England	FW	10 (6)	2	0	0	0	0	10 (6)	2
Alan Gowling	England	FW	41	17	1	0	4	2	46	19
Terry Gray	England	FW	24 (8)	3	1	0	0 (2)	0	25 (10)	3
Peter Hart	England	MF	13	0	0	0	0	0	13	0
Bobby Hoy	England	MF	23 (1)	3	1	0	4	0	28 (1)	3
Geoff Hutt	England	DF	28	0	1	0	3	0	32	0
Jimmy Lawson	England	MF	17 (3)	3	0	0	0	0	17 (3)	3
Lloyd Maitland	England	MF	12	1	0	0	0	0	12	1
Brian Marshall	England	DF	3	0	0	0	0	0	3	0
Grahame McGifford	England	DF	22	0	1	0	1	0	24	0
Billy McGinley	Scotland	FW	11 (4)	1	0	0	2 (1)	1	13 (5)	2
Ally McLeod	Scotland	FW	3 (1)	1	0	0	0	0	3 (1)	1
Bob Newton	England	FW	2 (1)	0	0	0	0	0	2 (1)	0
Brian O'Neil	England	MF	22 (1)	2	0	0	0	0	22 (1)	2
Terry Poole	England	GK	24	0	0	0	4	0	28	0
Graham Pugh	England	MF	15	0	1	0	3	0	19	0
John Saunders	England	DF	41	0	1	0	4	1	46	1
Steve Smith	England	MF	16	0	0	0	2	0	18	0
Steve Spriggs	England	MF	2 (2)	0	0	0	1	0	3 (2)	0
Phil Summerill	England	FW	6 (2)	1	0	0	2	1	8 (2)	2
Alan Sweeney	Scotland	DF	1	0	0	0	0	0	1	0
Dick Taylor	England	GK	21	0	1	0	0	0	22	0
John Turner	England	GK	1	0	0	0	0	0	1	0
