= 1973–74 Huddersfield Town A.F.C. season =

Huddersfield Town
1973–74 season
- Chairman: Stanley Kinder; Garrick Graham
- Manager: Ian Greaves
- Stadium: Leeds Road
- Football League Third Division: 10th
- FA Cup: Second round (eliminated by Chester)
- Football League Cup: First round (eliminated by York City)
- Top goalscorer: League: Alan Gowling (24); All: Alan Gowling (25)
- Highest home attendance: 11,514 vs Halifax Town (26 December 1973)
- Lowest home attendance: 2,522 vs Wrexham (24 April 1974)
- Biggest win: 5–0 vs Rochdale (23 February 1974)
- Biggest defeat: 0–6 vs Oldham Athletic (20 April 1974)

Huddersfield Town's 1973–74 campaign was a season of new beginnings for Huddersfield Town as they experienced life in the 3rd Division for the first time. The season was not spectacular as Town finished in 10th place, behind fellow West Yorkshire club Halifax Town. At the end of the season, Ian Greaves resigned after 6 years as manager. The alarming slide down the Football League was temporarily halted, but the following season would see Town continue their perilous freefall to the basement of the Football League.

== Squad at the start of the season ==
Note: Flags indicate national team as defined under FIFA eligibility rules; some limited exceptions apply. Players may hold more than one non-FIFA nationality.

Pos.	Nation	Player
GK	ENG	Terry Poole
GK	ENG	Dick Taylor
DF	ENG	Dennis Clarke
DF	ENG	Paul Garner
DF	ENG	Geoff Hutt
DF	ENG	Dave Lyon
DF	ENG	Brian Marshall
DF	ENG	Grahame McGifford
DF	ENG	John Saunders
MF	ENG	Les Chapman
MF	ENG	Terry Dolan
MF	ENG	Bobby Hoy

Pos.	Nation	Player
MF	NIR	Jimmy Nicholson
MF	ENG	Graham Pugh
MF	ENG	Paul Smith
MF	ENG	Steve Smith
FW	ENG	John Dungworth
FW	IRL	Mick Fairclough
FW	ENG	Alan Gowling
FW	ENG	Terry Gray
FW	WAL	Dick Krzywicki
FW	ENG	Jimmy Lawson
FW	ENG	Dave Smith
FW	ENG	Phil Summerill

== Review ==
Following Town's second relegation in 2 seasons, Town had reached a division not seen by any previous Town team in their history. Town would visit 13 grounds for the first time in league football, although 4 of them had hosted Town in cup matches before. Town's start to the season was pretty mediocre with Town drawing 6 of their opening 12 games, losing only 2 of them, but it was a far cry from 1st Division football they were playing just 2 seasons earlier. The previous season's top scorer, Alan Gowling, continued with his goalscoring form scoring 24 goals in the league campaign.

Town eventually finished the season in a disappointing 10th place with 47 points, 2 points behind local rivals Halifax Town. However, at the end of the season Ian Greaves resigned as manager of the side. He became Jimmy Armfield's assistant at Bolton Wanderers. The next season would see Town get even further down the league ladder, so even though Greaves had halted the slide, it was temporary, not permanent.

== Squad at the end of the season ==
Note: Flags indicate national team as defined under FIFA eligibility rules; some limited exceptions apply. Players may hold more than one non-FIFA nationality.

Pos.	Nation	Player
GK	ENG	Terry Poole
GK	ENG	Dick Taylor
DF	ENG	Paul Garner
DF	ENG	Peter Hart
DF	ENG	Geoff Hutt
DF	ENG	Dave Lyon
DF	ENG	Brian Marshall
DF	ENG	Grahame McGifford
DF	ENG	John Saunders
MF	ENG	Les Chapman
MF	ENG	Terry Dolan
MF	ENG	Martin Fowler
MF	ENG	Bobby Hoy
MF	ENG	Bob Mountain

Pos.	Nation	Player
MF	ENG	Graham Pugh
MF	ENG	Paul Smith
MF	ENG	Steve Smith
FW	ENG	John Dungworth
FW	IRL	Mick Fairclough
FW	ENG	Franny Firth
FW	ENG	Alan Gowling
FW	ENG	Terry Gray
FW	WAL	Dick Krzywicki
FW	ENG	Jimmy Lawson
FW	ENG	Bob Newton
FW	ENG	Dave Smith
FW	ENG	Phil Summerill

== Results ==
=== Division Three ===
Date	Opponents	Home/ Away	Result F — A	Scorers	Attendance	Position
25 August 1973	Watford	A	1–1	Hoy	6,246	12th
1 September 1973	Cambridge United	H	2–1	Gowling, Hoy	5,559	8th
8 September 1973	Port Vale	A	2–4	Dolan, Gowling	5,003	12th
11 September 1973	Chesterfield	H	1–0	Fairclough	6,164	8th
15 September 1973	Aldershot	H	1–0	Gowling	5,849	7th
17 September 1973	Walsall	A	0–3		5,491	8th
22 September 1973	Wrexham	A	0–0		6,665	9th
29 September 1973	Bournemouth	H	1–1	Gowling (pen)	5,360	12th
6 October 1973	Rochdale	A	1–1	Arnold (og)	3,220	12th
9 October 1973	Walsall	H	2–2	S. Smith, Dolan	4,436	12th
13 October 1973	Plymouth Argyle	H	2–1	S. Smith, Summerill	4,927	8th
19 October 1973	Tranmere Rovers	A	1–1	Gowling (pen)	4,715	5th
24 October 1973	Chesterfield	A	2–0	Dolan, Gowling	6,589	6th
27 October 1973	Bristol Rovers	H	1–2	Dolan	9,532	9th
3 November 1973	Southend United	A	2–5	Gowling (2)	7,255	10th
10 November 1973	Brighton & Hove Albion	H	2–2	Dolan, Summerill	6,057	12th
13 November 1973	Shrewsbury Town	H	1–0	Summerill	4,154	6th
17 November 1973	Hereford United	A	1–0	Gowling	7,925	6th
1 December 1973	Southport	A	0–0		2,109	6th
8 December 1973	Oldham Athletic	H	2–1	Gowling (2)	8,074	5th
22 December 1973	Bournemouth	A	0–1		9,141	7th
26 December 1973	Halifax Town	H	4–0	Lawson, Dolan, Gowling (2)	11,514	6th
29 December 1973	Port Vale	H	3–0	Lawson (2), Gowling	7,702	6th
1 January 1974	Cambridge United	A	2–2	Chapman, Hoy	5,667	6th
12 January 1974	Aldershot	A	0–1		5,029	6th
19 January 1974	Watford	H	1–2	Gowling	6,301	6th
26 January 1974	Charlton Athletic	A	1–2	Lawson	5,391	7th
29 January 1974	Blackburn Rovers	H	1–0	Lawson	5,204	5th
2 February 1974	Grimsby Town	A	1–2	Gowling	7,188	6th
16 February 1974	Plymouth Argyle	A	1–1	Summerill	7,299	10th
23 February 1974	Rochdale	H	5–0	Lawson (2), Gowling (2), Summerill	5,679	7th
2 March 1974	Halifax Town	A	0–0		8,126	7th
8 March 1974	Bristol Rovers	A	1–2	Gowling	13,543	7th
16 March 1974	Tranmere Rovers	H	0–0		4,702	7th
20 March 1974	Grimsby Town	H	1–0	Gray	4,473	7th
23 March 1974	Brighton & Hove Albion	A	2–1	Gowling (2)	12,444	7th
27 March 1974	Blackburn Rovers	A	0–1		6,671	7th
30 March 1974	Southend United	H	0–1		4,453	7th
2 April 1974	Charlton Athletic	H	2–0	Gowling (2)	3,142	7th
6 April 1974	Shrewsbury Town	A	0–3		1,675	7th
12 April 1974	York City	A	1–2	Dolan	10,189	8th
13 April 1974	Hereford United	H	0–0		4,148	9th
16 April 1974	York City	H	0–1		7,737	11th
20 April 1974	Oldham Athletic	A	0–6		16,466	13th
24 April 1974	Wrexham	H	2–1	Dolan, Summerill	2,522	13th
27 April 1974	Southport	H	3–1	Summerill, Dolan, Gowling	3,320	9th

=== FA Cup ===
Date	Round	Opponents	Home/ Away	Result F — A	Scorers	Attendance
24 November 1973	Round 1	Wigan Athletic	H	2–0	Newton (2)	9,557
15 December 1973	Round 2	Chester	A	2–3	Saunders, Gowling	3,296

=== Football League Cup ===
Date	Round	Opponents	Home/ Away	Result F — A	Scorers	Attendance
29 August 1973	Round 1	York City	A	0–1		6,497

== Appearances and goals ==
Name	Nationality	Position	League		FA Cup		League Cup		Total	
Name	Nationality	Position	Apps	Goals	Apps	Goals	Apps	Goals	Apps	Goals
Les Chapman	England	MF	31 (2)	1	1	0	1	0	33 (2)	1
Dennis Clarke	England	DF	4	0	0	0	0	0	4	0
Terry Dolan	England	MF	43	8	2	0	1	0	46	8
John Dungworth	England	FW	1 (2)	0	0	0	0	0	1 (2)	0
Mick Fairclough	Republic of Ireland	FW	3	1	0	0	0	0	3	1
Franny Firth	England	FW	1 (1)	0	0	0	0	0	1 (1)	0
Martin Fowler	England	MF	1 (1)	0	0	0	0	0	1 (1)	0
Paul Garner	England	DF	43	0	2	0	1	0	46	0
Alan Gowling	England	FW	45	24	2	1	1	0	48	25
Terry Gray	England	FW	9 (4)	1	2	0	0	0	11 (4)	1
Peter Hart	England	MF	1	0	0	0	0	0	1	0
Bobby Hoy	England	MF	26 (1)	3	2	0	1	0	29 (1)	3
Geoff Hutt	England	DF	26	0	2	0	0	0	28	0
Dick Krzywicki	Wales	MF	2 (1)	0	0	0	0	0	2 (1)	0
Jimmy Lawson	England	MF	31 (1)	7	0	0	0 (1)	0	31 (2)	7
Dave Lyon	England	DF	2 (1)	0	0	0	0	0	2 (1)	0
Brian Marshall	England	DF	24 (2)	0	0	0	0	0	24 (2)	0
Grahame McGifford	England	DF	16	0	0	0	1	0	17	0
Bob Mountain	England	MF	1	0	0	0	0	0	1	0
Bob Newton	England	FW	4	0	1	2	0	0	5	2
Jimmy Nicholson	Northern Ireland	MF	3 (1)	0	0	0	0	0	3 (1)	0
Terry Poole	England	GK	41	0	2	0	1	0	44	0
Graham Pugh	England	MF	28	0	2	0	0	0	30	0
John Saunders	England	DF	43	0	2	1	1	0	46	1
Dave Smith	England	MF	1 (1)	0	0	0	1	0	2 (1)	0
Paul Smith	England	MF	1	0	0 (1)	0	0	0	1 (1)	0
Steve Smith	England	MF	41	3	1	0	1	0	43	3
Phil Summerill	England	FW	29 (1)	7	1	0	1	0	31 (1)	7
Dick Taylor	England	GK	5	0	0	0	0	0	5	0
