= 1975–76 Huddersfield Town A.F.C. season =

Huddersfield Town
1975–76 season
- Chairman: Keith Longbottom
- Manager: Bobby Collins (until 23 December 1975); Tom Johnston (from 23 December 1975)
- Stadium: Leeds Road
- Football League Fourth Division: 5th
- FA Cup: Fourth round (eliminated by Bolton Wanderers)
- Football League Cup: Second round (eliminated by Derby County)
- Top goalscorer: League: Terry Gray (15); All: Terry Gray (19)
- Highest home attendance: 27,894 vs Bolton Wanderers (24 January 1976)
- Lowest home attendance: 3,595 vs Northampton Town (16 August 1975)
- Biggest win: 3–0 vs Darlington (21 February 1976); 3–0 vs Reading (28 February 1976)
- Biggest defeat: 1–4 vs Doncaster Rovers (4 November 1975); 1–4 vs Exeter City (27 March 1976); 0–3 vs Tranmere Rovers (17 April 1976)

Huddersfield Town's 1975–76 campaign was the first season in the 67 years existence of the club, that the team had been in the fourth tier of the Football League. Under Bobby Collins and then Tom Johnston, Town managed a 4th round appearance in the season's FA Cup competition and a 5th-place finish in Division 4. Town managed to finish just one place and two points behind 4th-placed Tranmere Rovers.

== Squad at the start of the season ==
Note: Flags indicate national team as defined under FIFA eligibility rules; some limited exceptions apply. Players may hold more than one non-FIFA nationality.

No.	Pos.	Nation	Player
--	GK	ENG	Terry Poole
--	GK	ENG	Dick Taylor
--	DF	ENG	Steve Baines
--	DF	ENG	Paul Garner
--	DF	ENG	Peter Hart
--	DF	ENG	Geoff Hutt
--	DF	ENG	Grahame McGifford
--	DF	ENG	John Saunders
--	DF	SCO	Alan Sweeney
--	MF	ENG	Terry Dolan
--	MF	ENG	Martin Fowler

No.	Pos.	Nation	Player
--	MF	ENG	Lloyd Maitland
--	MF	ENG	Brian O'Neil
--	MF	ENG	Steve Smith
--	FW	ENG	Rod Belfitt
--	FW	NIR	Bobby Campbell
--	FW	ENG	Barry Endean
--	FW	ENG	Franny Firth
--	FW	ENG	Colin Garwood
--	FW	ENG	Terry Gray
--	FW	ENG	Jimmy Lawson
--	FW	ENG	Bob Newton

== Review ==
Following their third relegation in four seasons, Town started the 1975–76 season in the Fourth Division, a level never seen by the Terriers, or by any team who had won the First Division. The Board had decided to return Town to the all-blue kit. The early part of the season under Bobby Collins and general manager Tom Johnston saw Town make a steady early start to the campaign, which only seemed to have a minor falter between late October and just before Christmas saw Town lose 6 out of 10 games, although the other 4 in that run were wins. The strain of general manager Johnston took its toll on manager Collins, who resigned two days before Christmas, with Johnston taking over, making him the first man in the club's history to have the job twice (Although, that is strictly speaking untrue as Ian Greaves was caretaker manager in 1964, before taking the job on a full-time basis in 1968 .).

Under Johnston, Town went on a pulsating run in the FA Cup fourth round, which led to a match-up with Bolton Wanderers, now managed by Ian Greaves, which Town narrowly lost 1–0. But, near the end of the season, Town without top scorer Terry Gray and his strike partner Bobby Campbell were both out with broken legs. Town's form plummeted as they only won 1 of their last 12 league games, whereas if any 3 of those winless games had resulted in wins, Town would have got promoted back into Division 3 at the first attempt, but instead they found themselves languishing in the division for another 4 seasons.

== Squad at the end of the season ==
Note: Flags indicate national team as defined under FIFA eligibility rules; some limited exceptions apply. Players may hold more than one non-FIFA nationality.

No.	Pos.	Nation	Player
--	GK	ENG	Terry Poole
--	GK	ENG	Dick Taylor
--	DF	ENG	Steve Baines
--	DF	ENG	Paul Garner
--	DF	ENG	Peter Hart
--	DF	ENG	Geoff Hutt
--	DF	ENG	Grahame McGifford
--	DF	ENG	John Saunders
--	DF	ENG	Arnie Sidebottom
--	DF	ENG	Chris Simpkin
--	DF	SCO	Alan Sweeney
--	MF	ENG	Terry Dolan

No.	Pos.	Nation	Player
--	MF	ENG	Martin Fowler
--	MF	ENG	Lloyd Maitland
--	MF	ENG	Steve Smith
--	FW	ENG	Rod Belfitt
--	FW	ENG	Mick Butler
--	FW	NIR	Bobby Campbell
--	FW	ENG	Franny Firth
--	FW	ENG	Wayne Goldthorpe
--	FW	ENG	Terry Gray
--	FW	ENG	Jimmy Lawson
--	FW	ENG	Bob Newton

== Results ==
=== Division Four ===
Date	Opponents	Home/ Away	Result F–A	Scorers	Attendance	Position
16 August 1975	Northampton Town	H	1–1	Gray	3,595	10th
23 August 1975	Watford	A	2–0	O'Neil (pen), Gray	4,500	6th
30 August 1975	Rochdale	H	0–0		4,185	5th
6 September 1975	Scunthorpe United	A	1–0	Campbell	2,232	1st
13 September 1975	Lincoln City	H	0–1		5,209	5th
20 September 1975	Cambridge United	A	0–0		3,150	6th
24 September 1975	Bradford City	A	2–2	Gray (2)	4,476	9th
27 September 1975	Brentford	H	2–1	Gray, Garwood	4,160	5th
4 October 1975	Workington	A	2–0	Maitland, Garwood	1,158	5th
11 October 1975	Swansea City	A	1–1	Garwood	3,332	6th
18 October 1975	Newport County	H	2–1	Garwood, Gray	5,477	4th
21 October 1975	Torquay United	H	2–3	Belfitt, Garwood	5,777	5th
25 October 1975	Reading	A	0–2		6,679	9th
1 November 1975	Hartlepool	H	2–0	Garwood (pen), Smith	4,183	7th
4 November 1975	Doncaster Rovers	A	1–4	Gray	10,650	9th
8 November 1975	Stockport County	A	1–0	Gray	2,789	7th
15 November 1975	Darlington	H	1–0	Smith	4,133	6th
29 November 1975	Barnsley	A	3–2	Lawson (2), Smith	5,007	5th
6 December 1975	Exeter City	H	0–1		4,987	6th
20 December 1975	Bournemouth	A	0–1		4,012	8th
26 December 1975	Tranmere Rovers	H	1–0	Belfitt	6,672	7th
27 December 1975	Southport	A	2–1	Belfitt, Smith	2,546	6th
17 January 1976	Cambridge United	H	2–0	Smith, Hart	5,195	6th
27 January 1976	Crewe Alexandra	H	1–0	Newton	4,459	6th
7 February 1976	Doncaster Rovers	H	1–2	Gray	6,305	7th
14 February 1976	Stockport County	H	2–2	Newton (2)	5,307	8th
17 February 1976	Torquay United	A	3–1	Gray (2), Baines	2,019	6th
21 February 1976	Darlington	A	3–0	Firth, Gray, Lawson	2,052	6th
28 February 1976	Reading	H	3–0	Newton, Gray (2)	6,546	7th
1 March 1976	Rochdale	A	0–0		3,791	5th
6 March 1976	Hartlepool	A	1–1	Gray	2,044	6th
9 March 1976	Workington	H	2–0	Hughes (og), Lawson	5,010	5th
13 March 1976	Swansea City	H	2–0	Butler, Firth	6,393	5th
17 March 1976	Newport County	A	2–1	Sidebottom, Butler	1,374	4th
20 March 1976	Barnsley	H	1–2	Goldthorpe	10,049	5th
23 March 1976	Lincoln City	A	0–0		11,290	5th
27 March 1976	Exeter City	A	1–4	Sidebottom	3,925	5th
30 March 1976	Bournemouth	H	0–0		5,834	5th
3 April 1976	Northampton Town	A	1–1	Belfitt	7,218	5th
5 April 1976	Brentford	A	0–0		4,413	5th
10 April 1976	Scunthorpe United	H	1–1	Dolan	6,502	5th
14 April 1976	Crewe Alexandra	A	2–0	Belfitt, Newton	2,750	5th
17 April 1976	Tranmere Rovers	A	0–3		8,308	5th
19 April 1976	Southport	H	1–2	Belfitt	6,324	5th
24 April 1976	Watford	H	1–0	Goldthorpe	3,787	5th
29 April 1976	Bradford City	H	0–0		4,779	5th

=== FA Cup ===
Date	Round	Opponents	Home/ Away	Result F–A	Scorers	Attendance
22 November 1975	Round 1	Walsall	A	1–0	Belfitt	5,506
13 December 1975	Round 2	Port Vale	H	2–1	Belfitt, Baines	6,218
3 January 1976	Round 3	Fulham	A	3–2	Gray (2), Lawson	10,299
24 January 1976	Round 4	Bolton Wanderers	H	0–1		27,894

=== Football League Cup ===
Date	Round	Opponents	Home/ Away	Result F–A	Scorers	Attendance
19 August 1975	Round 1 1st Leg	Barnsley	H	2–1	Gray, Dolan	4,200
27 August 1975	Round 1 2nd Leg	Barnsley	A	1–1	Campbell	6,043: Huddersfield won 3–2 on aggregate.
10 September 1975	Round 2	Derby County	A	1–2	Gray	20,602

== Appearances and goals ==
Name	Nationality	Position	League		FA Cup		League Cup		Total	
Name	Nationality	Position	Apps	Goals	Apps	Goals	Apps	Goals	Apps	Goals
Steve Baines	England	DF	41	1	4	1	3	0	48	2
Rod Belfitt	England	FW	28	6	4	2	3	0	35	8
Mick Butler	England	MF	9 (1)	2	0	0	0	0	9 (1)	2
Bobby Campbell	Northern Ireland	FW	11	1	0	0	3	1	14	2
Willie Coulson	England	MF	2	0	0	0	0	0	2	0
Terry Dolan	England	MF	29 (1)	1	3	0	3	1	35 (1)	2
Barry Endean	England	MF	2 (2)	0	0	0	0	0	2 (2)	0
Franny Firth	England	FW	16	2	0	0	0	0	16	2
Martin Fowler	England	MF	6 (2)	0	0	0	0	0	6 (2)	0
Paul Garner	England	DF	16	0	0	0	3	0	19	0
Colin Garwood	England	FW	12	6	2	0	0	0	14	6
Wayne Goldthorpe	England	FW	6 (2)	2	0	0	0	0	6 (2)	2
Terry Gray	England	FW	29	15	4	2	3	2	36	19
Peter Hart	England	MF	17 (2)	1	0	0	0	0	17 (2)	1
Geoff Hutt	England	DF	20	0	4	0	3	0	27	0
Jimmy Lawson	England	MF	22 (3)	4	3	1	0	0	25 (3)	5
Lloyd Maitland	England	MF	9 (6)	1	1	0	0	0	10 (6)	1
Grahame McGifford	England	DF	3	0	0	0	0	0	3	0
Bob Newton	England	FW	16 (2)	5	0	0	0	0	16 (2)	5
Brian O'Neil	England	MF	38	1	3	0	3	0	44	1
Terry Poole	England	GK	4	0	0	0	0	0	4	0
John Saunders	England	DF	17	0	0	0	3	0	20	0
Arnie Sidebottom	England	DF	9	2	0	0	0	0	9	2
Chris Simpkin	England	DF	25	0	4	0	0	0	29	0
Steve Smith	England	MF	41	5	4	0	3	0	48	5
Alan Sweeney	Scotland	DF	36	0	4	0	0	0	40	0
Dick Taylor	England	GK	42	0	4	0	3	0	49	0
