= 1976–77 Huddersfield Town A.F.C. season =

Huddersfield Town
1976–77 season
- Chairman: Keith Longbottom
- Manager: Tom Johnston (until 22 April 1977); John Haselden (from 22 April 1977)
- Stadium: Leeds Road
- Football League Fourth Division: 9th
- FA Cup: First round (eliminated by Mansfield Town)
- Football League Cup: Third round (eliminated by Chelsea)
- Top goalscorer: League: Kevin Johnson (13); All: Kevin Johnson (13)
- Highest home attendance: 11,829 vs Cambridge United (19 April 1977)
- Lowest home attendance: 2,275 vs Southend United (7 May 1977)
- Biggest win: 4–0 vs Scunthorpe United (9 April 1977)
- Biggest defeat: 0–2 vs Darlington (18 September 1976); 0–2 vs Chelsea (20 September 1976); 0–2 vs Exeter City (12 November 1976); 1–3 vs Bradford City (19 March 1977); 0–2 vs Doncaster Rovers (25 March 1977); 0–2 vs Watford (16 April 1977); 1–3 vs Colchester United (19 April 1977)

Huddersfield Town's 1976–77 campaign was Huddersfield Town's second season in the 4th Division. Under Tom Johnston, Town almost gained promotion back to the 3rd Division, but a dreadful end to the season saw Town finish in 9th place with 50 points, 9 points off 4th place, which was taken by rivals Bradford City.

== Squad at the start of the season ==
Note: Flags indicate national team as defined under FIFA eligibility rules; some limited exceptions apply. Players may hold more than one non-FIFA nationality.

Pos.	Nation	Player
GK	ENG	Terry Poole
GK	ENG	Dick Taylor
DF	ENG	Steve Baines
DF	ENG	Paul Cooper
DF	ENG	Neil Hague
DF	ENG	Peter Hart
DF	SCO	Peter Oliver
DF	ENG	Arnie Sidebottom
DF	SCO	Alan Sweeney
MF	ENG	Terry Armstrong

Pos.	Nation	Player
MF	ENG	Martin Fowler
MF	ENG	Lloyd Maitland
MF	ENG	Steve Smith
FW	ENG	Mick Butler
FW	NIR	Bobby Campbell
FW	ENG	Franny Firth
FW	ENG	Wayne Goldthorpe
FW	ENG	Terry Gray
FW	ENG	Bob Newton

== Review ==
Town had a mixed start to the season, with wins and draws seeming to come from all over the place. Although they were never on a massive losing or unbeaten run under Tom Johnston, they mainly relied on new signing Kevin Johnson from Hartlepool, who scored 13 goals during the season.

They had a run of 7 straight wins during late January to early March saw Town climb ever nearer to promotion, but the last nine games (6 of them under Johnston's replacement, John Haselden) saw Town fail to win a single match, which saw Town slumber down the table into a final position of 9th place, just 14 points off 4th place, which was taken up by rivals Bradford City.

== Squad at the end of the season ==
Note: Flags indicate national team as defined under FIFA eligibility rules; some limited exceptions apply. Players may hold more than one non-FIFA nationality.

Pos.	Nation	Player
GK	ENG	Alan Starling
GK	ENG	Dick Taylor
DF	ENG	Steve Baines
DF	ENG	Paul Cooper
DF	ENG	Paul Gartland
DF	ENG	Neil Hague
DF	ENG	Peter Hart
DF	SCO	Peter Oliver
DF	ENG	Arnie Sidebottom
DF	SCO	Alan Sweeney
MF	ENG	Terry Armstrong
MF	ENG	Martin Fowler

Pos.	Nation	Player
MF	ENG	Kevin Johnson
MF	ENG	Lloyd Maitland
MF	ENG	Jim McCaffrey
MF	ENG	Steve Smith
FW	ENG	Mick Butler
FW	NIR	Bobby Campbell
FW	ENG	Terry Eccles
FW	ENG	Franny Firth
FW	ENG	Wayne Goldthorpe
FW	ENG	Terry Gray
FW	ENG	Peter Howey
FW	ENG	Bob Newton

== Results ==
=== Division Four ===
Date	Opponents	Home/ Away	Result F–A	Scorers	Attendance	Position
21 August 1976	Torquay United	A	0–1		3,955	19th
28 August 1976	Brentford	H	1–0	Newton	4,559	15th
4 September 1976	Newport County	A	1–1	Firth	2,247	14th
11 September 1976	Swansea City	H	2–2	Newton, Firth	4,048	15th
14 September 1976	Southport	H	1–0	Smith	4,174	8th
18 September 1976	Darlington	A	0–2		3,037	11th
25 September 1976	Stockport County	H	2–0	Johnson, Baines	5,916	9th
2 October 1976	Barnsley	A	1–2	Butler	7,124	14th
9 October 1976	Bradford City	H	3–0	Sidebottom, Butler, Johnson	10,608	10th
16 October 1976	Doncaster Rovers	H	2–1	Sidebottom, Jones	7,494	7th
23 October 1976	Aldershot	A	0–1		4,598	11th
26 October 1976	Watford	H	2–2	Johnson (2, 1 pen.)	5,299	9th
30 October 1976	Hartlepool	A	1–0	Goldthorpe	2,613	6th
2 November 1976	Cambridge United	A	1–1	Goldthorpe	4,357	7th
6 November 1976	Workington	H	2–1	Hague, Smith	5,621	5th
12 November 1976	Exeter City	A	0–2		3,657	9th
26 November 1976	Rochdale	H	2–1	Johnson (pen.), Jones	5,240	7th
4 December 1976	Southend United	A	1–1	Baines	4,419	6th
18 December 1976	Crewe Alexandra	H	0–1		4,932	8th
27 December 1976	Halifax Town	A	0–0		8,720	8th
28 December 1976	Scunthorpe United	H	1–0	Hague	7,028	6th
1 January 1977	Workington	A	2–3	Baines, Johnson	2,133	8th
8 January 1977	Bournemouth	A	0–1		4,494	12th
15 January 1977	Southport	A	2–2	Campbell (2)	1,803	11th
22 January 1977	Torquay United	H	2–1	Johnson, Eccles	6,237	10th
5 February 1977	Brentford	A	3–1	Johnson, Campbell, N. Smith (o.g.)	4,830	11th
12 February 1977	Newport County	H	3–0	Eccles, Campbell, Johnson (pen.)	5,452	9th
15 February 1977	Hartlepool	H	4–1	Johnson, Baines, Fowler, Creamer (o.g.)	5,493	5th
26 February 1977	Darlington	H	3–1	Campbell (2), Johnson (pen.)	6,315	7th
4 March 1977	Stockport County	A	3–2	Campbell, Gray (2)	5,499	5th
12 March 1977	Barnsley	H	1–0	Eccles	11,659	4th
19 March 1977	Bradford City	A	1–3	Oliver	10,734	6th
21 March 1977	Colchester United	H	0–0		7,508	4th
25 March 1977	Doncaster Rovers	A	0–2		11,042	6th
2 April 1977	Aldershot	H	2–0	Hart, Butler	5,073	7th
5 April 1977	Halifax Town	H	1–0	Smith	7,591	5th
9 April 1977	Scunthorpe United	A	4–0	Gray (3), Johnson	4,207	5th
12 April 1977	Cambridge United	H	1–2	Johnson	11,829	6th
16 April 1977	Watford	A	0–2		6,181	7th
19 April 1977	Colchester United	H	1–3	Dowman (o.g.)	5,057	9th
23 April 1977	Exeter City	H	0–1		4,717	10th
26 April 1977	Swansea City	A	1–2	Gray	9,613	10th
30 April 1977	Rochdale	A	2–2	Baines, Campbell	1,626	10th
3 May 1977	Bournemouth	H	0–0		2,342	10th
7 May 1977	Southend United	H	1–1	Howey	2,275	10th
14 May 1977	Crewe Alexandra	A	0–0		2,153	9th

=== FA Cup ===
Date	Round	Opponents	Home/ Away	Result F–A	Scorers	Attendance
20 November 1976	Round 1	Mansfield Town	H	0–0		9,025
22 November 1976	Round 1 Replay	Mansfield Town	A	1–2	Sidebottom	9,036

=== Football League Cup ===
Date	Round	Opponents	Home/ Away	Result F–A	Scorers	Attendance
14 August 1976	Round 1 1st Leg	Hartlepool	H	2–0	Baines, Newton	3,603
18 August 1976	Round 1 2nd Leg	Hartlepool	A	2–1	Newton, Butler	2,060: Huddersfield won 4–1 on aggregate.
31 August 1976	Round 2	Northampton Town	A	1–0	Newton	6,641
20 September 1976	Round 3	Chelsea	A	0–2		19,860

== Appearances and goals ==
Name	Nationality	Position	League		FA Cup		League Cup		Total	
Name	Nationality	Position	Apps	Goals	Apps	Goals	Apps	Goals	Apps	Goals
Terry Armstrong	England	FW	4	0	0	0	0	0	4	0
Steve Baines	England	DF	43 (1)	5	2	0	4	1	49 (1)	6
Mick Butler	England	MF	23 (3)	3	0	0	3	1	26 (3)	4
Bobby Campbell	Northern Ireland	FW	19 (1)	8	0	0	0	0	19 (1)	8
Paul Cooper	England	DF	2	0	0	0	0	0	2	0
Terry Eccles	England	FW	17	3	0	0	0	0	17	3
Franny Firth	England	FW	8	2	0	0	4	0	12	2
Martin Fowler	England	MF	36 (3)	1	2	0	4	0	42 (3)	1
Paul Gartland	England	DF	3	0	0	0	0	0	3	0
John Gilligan	England	MF	0 (1)	0	0	0	0	0	0 (1)	0
Wayne Goldthorpe	England	FW	5 (2)	2	1	0	1	0	7 (2)	2
Terry Gray	England	FW	17 (1)	6	0	0	0	0	17 (1)	6
Neil Hague	England	DF	25	2	1	0	4	0	30	2
Peter Hart	England	MF	44	1	2	0	4	0	50	1
Peter Howey	England	MF	3	1	0	0	0	0	3	1
Kevin Johnson	England	FW	38	13	0 (1)	0	0	0	38 (1)	13
Chris Jones	England	MF	9 (5)	2	1 (1)	0	1 (1)	0	11 (7)	2
Lloyd Maitland	England	MF	10 (2)	0	2	0	4	0	16 (2)	0
Jim McCaffrey	England	MF	14 (1)	0	0	0	0	0	14 (1)	0
Bob Newton	England	FW	15 (2)	2	2	0	3 (1)	3	20 (3)	5
Peter Oliver	Scotland	DF	41	1	2	0	4	0	47	1
Terry Poole	England	GK	24	0	2	0	4	0	30	0
Arnie Sidebottom	England	DF	18 (5)	2	2	1	0 (2)	0	20 (7)	3
Steve Smith	England	MF	44	3	2	0	4	0	50	3
Alan Starling	England	GK	13	0	0	0	0	0	13	0
Alan Sweeney	Scotland	DF	21	0	1	0	0	0	22	0
Dick Taylor	England	GK	9	0	0	0	0	0	9	0
Paul Walker	England	MF	1	0	0	0	0	0	1	0
