= 1972–73 Huddersfield Town A.F.C. season =

Huddersfield Town
1972–73 season
- Chairman: Frank Drabble; Stanley Kinder
- Manager: Ian Greaves
- Stadium: Leeds Road
- Football League Second Division: 21st (relegated)
- FA Cup: Third round (eliminated by Carlisle United)
- Football League Cup: Second round (eliminated by Tottenham Hotspur)
- Top goalscorer: League: Alan Gowling (17); All: Alan Gowling (17)
- Highest home attendance: 13,689 vs Burnley (14 April 1973)
- Lowest home attendance: 3,871 vs Luton Town (20 January 1973)
- Biggest win: 2–0 vs Rochdale (9 September 1972); 2–0 vs Portsmouth (28 April 1973)
- Biggest defeat: 1–4 vs Luton Town (2 September 1972); 0–3 vs Sunderland (10 April 1973); 1–4 vs Cardiff City (21 April 1973)
Home colours

Huddersfield Town's 1972–73 campaign saw Town get relegated for a consecutive season, which saw them drop into the 3rd Division for the first time in their history. Despite the 17 goals of new signing Alan Gowling from Manchester United, Town were relegated by goal average from Cardiff City, who were beaten by Town to the 1st Division title in 1924.

== Squad at the start of the season ==
Note: Flags indicate national team as defined under FIFA eligibility rules; some limited exceptions apply. Players may hold more than one non-FIFA nationality.

Pos.	Nation	Player
GK	ENG	Gary Pierce
GK	ENG	Terry Poole
GK	ENG	Chris Wood
DF	ENG	Dennis Clarke
DF	ENG	Geoff Hutt
DF	ENG	Alan Jones
DF	ENG	Dave Lyon
DF	ENG	Brian Marshall
DF	ENG	Grahame McGifford
MF	WAL	Mike Barry
MF	ENG	Les Chapman

Pos.	Nation	Player
MF	ENG	Terry Dolan
MF	ENG	Bobby Hoy
MF	NIR	Jimmy Nicholson
MF	ENG	Graham Pugh
MF	ENG	Steve Smith
FW	ENG	John Dungworth
FW	IRL	Mick Fairclough
FW	ENG	Alan Gowling
FW	WAL	Dick Krzywicki
FW	ENG	Jimmy Lawson
FW	ENG	Dave Smith

== Review ==
Following the relegation of Town from 1st Division at the end of the previous season, Town's three most experienced players, Trevor Cherry, Roy Ellam and Frank Worthington all left for pastures new, but the money received from their transfers was used to sign the experience of Alan Gowling from Manchester United and Graham Pugh from Sheffield Wednesday. However, a rise back up to Division 1 had a bad start, with Town drawing most of their opening matches and not making any realistic ground on any of the promotion chasing teams such as Burnley and Queens Park Rangers.

Town had only 7 wins in the league by the end of the season, with Town needing to win the last game of the season at home to Portsmouth to have any chance of Town avoiding the unthinkable drop to Division 3. Town beat Pompey 2–0 thanks to goals from Mick Fairclough and new signing Phil Summerill gave Town the needed win, but they had to wait on other results to go their way. Cardiff City got their needed result from their game in hand, which relegated Town on goal average. It was revenge on Town, who pipped Cardiff to the 1st Division title in 1924. They finished 21st with 33 points, getting relegated to Division 3 with Brighton & Hove Albion.

== Squad at the end of the season ==
Note: Flags indicate national team as defined under FIFA eligibility rules; some limited exceptions apply. Players may hold more than one non-FIFA nationality.

Pos.	Nation	Player
GK	ENG	Gary Pierce
GK	ENG	Terry Poole
GK	ENG	Chris Wood
DF	ENG	Dennis Clarke
DF	ENG	Paul Garner
DF	ENG	Geoff Hutt
DF	ENG	Alan Jones
DF	ENG	Dave Lyon
DF	ENG	Brian Marshall
DF	ENG	Grahame McGifford
DF	ENG	John Saunders
MF	WAL	Mike Barry
MF	ENG	Les Chapman

Pos.	Nation	Player
MF	ENG	Terry Dolan
MF	ENG	Bobby Hoy
MF	NIR	Jimmy Nicholson
MF	ENG	Graham Pugh
MF	ENG	Paul Smith
MF	ENG	Steve Smith
FW	ENG	John Dungworth
FW	IRL	Mick Fairclough
FW	ENG	Alan Gowling
FW	WAL	Dick Krzywicki
FW	ENG	Jimmy Lawson
FW	ENG	Dave Smith
FW	ENG	Phil Summerill

== Results ==
=== Division Two ===
Date	Opponents	Home/ Away	Result F–A	Scorers	Attendance	Position
12 August 1972	Blackpool	H	1–0	Krzywicki	12,840	1st
19 August 1972	Aston Villa	A	0–2		34,843	15th
26 August 1972	Carlisle United	H	1–1	D. Smith	9,483	13th
30 August 1972	Portsmouth	A	2–1	Gowling (2)	16,419	8th
2 September 1972	Luton Town	A	1–4	Gowling	8,133	13th
9 September 1972	Oxford United	H	2–0	D. Smith (2)	7,356	9th
16 September 1972	Fulham	A	1–1	D. Smith	7,071	9th
19 September 1972	Swindon Town	H	1–1	Lawson	7,992	10th
23 September 1972	Sunderland	H	1–1	Chapman	10,145	10th
27 September 1972	Sheffield Wednesday	A	2–3	Gowling, Chapman	22,185	11th
30 September 1972	Bristol City	A	0–0		12,406	11th
7 October 1972	Nottingham Forest	A	1–1	Gowling	7,931	13th
14 October 1972	Brighton & Hove Albion	H	0–2		7,935	15th
21 October 1972	Middlesbrough	A	1–2	Dungworth	9,907	15th
28 October 1972	Orient	H	1–1	Gowling (pen)	6,232	15th
4 November 1972	Sheffield United	H	1–0	Gowling	12,806	14th
11 November 1972	Swindon Town	A	1–1	Gowling	9,673	13th
14 November 1972	Bristol City	H	0–1		5,692	14th
18 November 1972	Cardiff City	H	2–1	Pugh, Krzywicki	5,886	13th
25 November 1972	Millwall	A	0–1		9,112	16th
2 December 1972	Preston North End	H	0–0		6,900	14th
23 December 1972	Hull City	H	1–3	Gowling	6,827	17th
30 December 1972	Aston Villa	H	1–1	Gowling	9,719	18th
6 January 1973	Carlisle United	A	0–0		6,986	18th
20 January 1973	Luton Town	H	1–2	Hutt	3,871	19th
27 January 1973	Oxford United	A	0–2		8,107	20th
3 February 1973	Burnley	A	1–2	Gowling (pen)	14,589	20th
6 February 1973	Queens Park Rangers	A	1–3	Gowling	13,539	20th
10 February 1973	Fulham	H	1–0	Saunders	6,469	20th
17 February 1973	Blackpool	A	1–1	Hoy	8,593	18th
3 March 1973	Nottingham Forest	H	1–1	Summerill	7,473	21st
6 March 1973	Queens Park Rangers	H	2–2	Summerill, S. Smith	8,627	18th
10 March 1973	Brighton & Hove Albion	A	1–2	Gowling	10,053	20th
17 March 1973	Middlesbrough	H	1–1	Gowling (pen)	7,193	20th
24 March 1973	Orient	A	1–3	Gowling	5,497	20th
31 March 1973	Millwall	H	1–0	Gowling	5,551	20th
7 April 1973	Preston North End	A	0–0		7,896	20th
10 April 1973	Sunderland	A	0–3		32,251	20th
14 April 1973	Burnley	H	0–2		13,689	20th
21 April 1973	Cardiff City	A	1–4	Gowling	12,379	21st
23 April 1973	Hull City	A	0–0		7,480	21st
28 April 1973	Portsmouth	H	2–0	Fairclough, Summerill	8,993	20th: Town dropped to 21st after Cardiff City's last game, which was at a later date.

=== FA Cup ===
Date	Round	Opponents	Home/ Away	Result F–A	Scorers	Attendance
13 January 1973	Round 3	Carlisle United	A	2–2	Fairclough (2)	9,557
16 January 1973	Round 3 Replay	Carlisle United	H	0–1		13,555

=== Football League Cup ===
Date	Round	Opponents	Home/ Away	Result F–A	Scorers	Attendance
6 September 1972	Round 2	Tottenham Hotspur	A	1–2	Pugh	21,422

== Appearances and goals ==
Name	Nationality	Position	League		FA Cup		League Cup		Total	
Name	Nationality	Position	Apps	Goals	Apps	Goals	Apps	Goals	Apps	Goals
Mike Barry	Wales	MF	17	0	2	0	0	0	19	0
Les Chapman	England	MF	22	2	0	0	1	0	23	2
Dennis Clarke	England	DF	31	0	2	0	0	0	33	0
Terry Dolan	England	MF	21 (2)	0	2	0	1	0	24 (2)	0
John Dungworth	England	FW	13 (3)	1	0	0	0	0	13 (3)	1
Mick Fairclough	Republic of Ireland	FW	14 (6)	1	2	2	1	0	17 (6)	3
Paul Garner	England	DF	2	0	0	0	0	0	2	0
Alan Gowling	England	FW	42	17	2	0	1	0	45	17
Bobby Hoy	England	MF	19	1	2	0	0	0	21	1
Geoff Hutt	England	DF	35	1	2	0	1	0	38	1
Alan Jones	England	DF	8	0	0	0	0	0	8	0
Dick Krzywicki	Wales	MF	8 (1)	2	0	0	0	0	8 (1)	2
Jimmy Lawson	England	MF	22	1	2	0	1	0	25	1
Dave Lyon	England	DF	20	0	1	0	1	0	22	0
Brian Marshall	England	DF	3	0	0	0	0	0	3	0
Grahame McGifford	England	DF	0 (1)	0	0	0	0	0	0 (1)	0
Jimmy Nicholson	Northern Ireland	MF	26	0	0	0	1	0	27	0
Gary Pierce	England	GK	13	0	0	0	1	0	14	0
Terry Poole	England	GK	22	0	2	0	0	0	24	0
Graham Pugh	England	MF	37	1	0	0	1	1	38	2
John Saunders	England	DF	20	1	1	0	0	0	21	1
Dave Smith	England	MF	18 (4)	4	2	0	1	0	21 (4)	4
Paul Smith	England	MF	0 (1)	0	0	0	0	0	0 (1)	0
Steve Smith	England	MF	29 (1)	1	0	0	0	0	29 (1)	1
Phil Summerill	England	FW	13 (3)	3	0	0	0	0	13 (3)	3
Chris Wood	England	GK	7	0	0	0	0	0	7	0
