= 1967–68 Leeds United A.F.C. season =

Leeds United
1967–68 season
- Chairman: Percy Woodward
- Manager: Don Revie
- Stadium: Elland Road
- First Division: 4th
- FA Cup: Semi-final
- League Cup: Winners
- Inter-Cities Fairs Cup: Winners
- Top goalscorer: League: Peter Lorimer (16); All: Peter Lorimer (30)
- Highest home attendance: 51,818 vs Manchester City, First Division, 23 March 1968
- Lowest home attendance: 11,473 vs Luton Town, League Cup, 13 September 1967
- Average home league attendance: 36,733

The 1967–68 season was Leeds United's 41st season in the Football League, and their fourth consecutive season in the First Division, in which they finished 4th. Along with the First Division, they competed in the FA Cup, where they were defeated in the semi-final by Everton. The club were more successful in their other two cup competitions however, winning the Football League Cup after beating Arsenal in the final, and the Inter-Cities Fairs Cup after beating Ferencváros in that final over two legs.

== Competitions ==
=== First Division ===
==== League table ====
Pos	Team	Pld	W	D	L	GF	GA	GAv	Pts	Qualification or relegation
2	Manchester United	42	24	8	10	89	55	1.618	56	Qualification for the European Cup first round (Note: Manchester United qualified for the European Cup as the 1967–68 European Cup winners.)
3	Liverpool	42	22	11	9	71	40	1.775	55	Qualification for the Inter-Cities Fairs Cup first round
4	Leeds United	42	22	9	11	71	41	1.732	53	Qualification for the Inter-Cities Fairs Cup first round
5	Everton	42	23	6	13	67	40	1.675	52	
6	Chelsea	42	18	12	12	62	68	0.912	48	Qualification for the Inter-Cities Fairs Cup first round (Note: Everton were ineligible to participate in the Inter-Cities Fairs Cup as Liverpool had already qualified. Under the rules of the cup, only one team per city could participate. Chelsea took their place as the highest-ranked team that had not already qualified for a European competition.)

Source: World Football
Rules for classification: 1) Points; 2) Goal average; 3) Goals scored

==== Matches ====
Win	Draw	Loss

First Division match details
Date	Opponent	Venue	Result F–A	Scorers	Attendance
19 August 1967	Sunderland	H	1–1	Greenhoff	36,252
23 August 1967	Manchester United	A	0–1		53,016
26 August 1967	Wolverhampton Wanderers	A	0–2		35,368
2 September 1967	Fulham	H	2–0	Belfitt (2)	25,760
9 September 1967	Southampton	A	1–1	Lorimer	25,522
16 September 1967	Everton	A	1–0	Gray	53,159
20 September 1967	Burnley	H	2–1	Lorimer (2)	32,944
23 September 1967	Leicester City	H	3–2	Lorimer (2, 1 pen.), Greenhoff	37,084
30 September 1967	West Ham United	A	0–0		28,940
7 October 1967	Chelsea	H	7–0	Johanneson, Greenhoff, Charlton, Lorimer, Gray, Hinton (o.g.). Bremner	40,460
14 October 1967	West Bromwich Albion	A	0–2		21,300
25 October 1967	Newcastle United	H	2–0	Lorimer, Johanneson	30,347
28 October 1967	Manchester City	A	0–1		39,713
4 November 1967	Arsenal	H	3–1	Lorimer (pen.), Jones, Gray	31,632
8 November 1967	Manchester United	H	1–0	Greenhoff	43,999
11 November 1967	Sheffield United	A	0–1		24,715
18 November 1967	Coventry City	H	1–1	Lorimer	32,469
25 November 1967	Nottingham Forest	A	2–0	Greenhoff, Lorimer	29,750
2 December 1967	Stoke City	H	2–0	Lorimer, Madeley	29,988
9 December 1967	Liverpool	A	0–2		39,675
16 December 1967	Sunderland	A	2–2	Greenhoff, Gray	21,189
23 December 1967	Wolverhampton Wanderers	H	2–1	Jones, Charlton	28,376
26 December 1967	Sheffield Wednesday	A	1–0	Giles (pen.)	51,055
30 December 1967	Sheffield Wednesday	H	3–2	Greenhoff, Gray, Hunter	36,409
6 January 1968	Fulham	A	5–0	Greenhoff (3), Gray (2)	24,419
13 January 1968	Southampton	H	5–0	Madeley (2), Lorimer, Jones, Hibbitt	31,474
20 January 1968	Everton	H	2–0	Jones, Giles (pen.)	44,119
3 February 1968	Leicester City	A	2–2	Madeley, Giles	30,081
10 February 1968	West Ham United	H	2–1	Lorimer (2)	41,814
13 March 1968	Nottingham Forest	H	1–1	Bremner	32,508
16 March 1968	Newcastle United	A	1–1	Hunter	45,190
20 March 1968	Chelsea	A	0–0		47,470
23 March 1968	Manchester City	H	2–0	Charlton, Giles	51,818
6 April 1968	Sheffield United	H	3–0	Madeley, Giles (2, 2 pens.)	31,059
12 April 1968	Tottenham Hotspur	A	1–2	Madeley	56,597
13 April 1968	Coventry City	A	1–0	Hibbitt	48,778
17 April 1968	Tottenham Hotspur	H	1–0	Lorimer (pen.)	50,000
20 April 1968	West Bromwich Albion	H	3–1	Gray (pen.), Madeley, Charlton	38,334
23 April 1968	Stoke City	A	2–3	Charlton, Greenhoff	23,999
4 May 1968	Liverpool	H	1–2	Jones	44,553
7 May 1968	Arsenal	A	3–4	Lorimer, Jones, Giles	25,043
11 May 1968	Burnley	A	0–3		13,247

=== FA Cup ===
Win	Draw	Loss

FA Cup match results
Round	Date	Opponent	Venue	Result F–A	Scorers	Attendance
Third round	27 January 1968	Derby County	H	2–0	Charlton, Lorimer	39,753
Fourth round	17 February 1968	Nottingham Forest	H	2–1	Jones, Giles	51,739
Fifth round	9 March 1968	Bristol City	H	2–0	Jones, Lorimer	45,227
Sixth round	30 March 1968	Sheffield United	H	1–0	Madeley	48,322
Semi-final	27 April 1968	Everton	N	0–1		63,000

=== League Cup ===
Win	Draw	Loss

League Cup match details
Round	Date	Opponent	Venue	Result F–A	Scorers	Attendance
Second round	13 September 1967	Luton Town	H	3–1	Lorimer (3, 1 pen.)	11,473
Third round	11 October 1967	Bury	H	3–0	Charlton, Johanneson, Greenhoff	20,927
Fourth round	15 November 1967	Sunderland	A	2–0	Greenhoff (2)	29,536
Fifth round	13 December 1967	Stoke City	H	2–0	Bremner, Lorimer	24,558
Semi-final, first leg	17 January 1968	Derby County	A	1–0	Giles (pen.)	31,904
Semi-final, second leg	7 February 1968	Derby County	H	3–2	Belfitt (2), Gray	29,367
Final	2 March 1968	Arsenal	N	1–0	Cooper	97,887

=== Inter-Cities Fairs Cup ===
Win	Draw	Loss

Inter-Cities Fairs Cup match details
Round	Date	Opponent	Venue	Result F–A	Scorers	Attendance
First round, first leg	3 October 1967	Spora Luxembourg	A	9–0	Lorimer (4), Bremner, Greenhoff (2), Madeley, Jones	2,500
First round, second leg	17 October 1967	Spora Luxembourg	H	7–0	Johanneson (3), Greenhoff (2), Cooper, Lorimer	15,196
Second round, first leg	29 November 1967	Partizan Belgrade	A	2–1	Lorimer, Belfitt	10,000
Second round, second leg	6 December 1967	Partizan Belgrade	H	1–1	Lorimer	34,258
Third round, first leg	20 December 1967	Hibernian	H	1–0	Gray	31,522
Third round, second leg	10 January 1968	Hibernian	A	1–1	Charlton	30,000
Fourth round, first leg	26 March 1968	Rangers	A	0–0		80,000
Fourth round, second leg	9 April 1968	Rangers	H	2–0	Giles (pen.), Lorimer	50,498
Semi-final, first leg	1 May 1968	Dundee	A	1–1	Madeley	30,000
Semi-final, second leg	15 May 1968	Dundee	H	1–0	Gray	23,830
Final, first leg	7 August 1968	Ferencváros	H	1–0	Jones	25,268
Final, second leg	11 September 1968	Ferencváros	A	0–0		76,000

== Appearances and goals ==
Numbers in parentheses denote appearances made as a substitute.
Players with name in italics and marked * were on loan from another club for the whole of their season with Leeds.
Key to positions: GK – Goalkeeper; DF – Defender; MF – Midfielder; FW – Forward

Players' appearances and goals by competition
Pos.	Nat.	Name	League		FA Cup		League Cup		Inter-Cities Fairs Cup		Total	
Pos.	Nat.	Name	Apps	Goals	Apps	Goals	Apps	Goals	Apps	Goals	Apps	Goals
GK	WAL	Gary Sprake	36	0	5	0	7	0	8	0	56	0
GK	SCO	David Harvey	6	0	0	0	0	0	4	0	10	0
DF	ENG	Paul Reaney	40 (1)	0	5	0	7	0	12	0	64 (1)	0
DF	SCO	Willie Bell	3	0	0	0	1	0	0	0	4	0
DF	ENG	Jack Charlton	34	5	4	1	5	1	11	1	54	8
DF	ENG	Norman Hunter	40	2	5	0	7	0	12	0	64	2
DF	ENG	Terry Cooper	37	0	5	0	6	1	12	1	60	2
DF	ENG	Nigel Davey	2	0	0	0	0	0	0	0	2	0
DF	ENG	Bobby Sibbald	1	0	0	0	0	0	0	0	1	0
MF	ENG	Mick Bates	6 (1)	0	0	0	0 (3)	0	0 (3)	0	6 (7)	0
MF	SCO	Billy Bremner	36	2	5	0	6	1	11	1	58	4
MF	IRL	Johnny Giles	20	7	5	1	3	1	7	1	35	10
MF	SCO	Eddie Gray	32	6	3	0	7	1	8	2	50	9
MF	ENG	Terry Hibbitt	12 (4)	2	1	0	2	0	3	0	18 (4)	2
MF	SCO	Jimmy Lumsden	1	0	0	0	0	0	0	0	1	0
MF	ENG	Paul Madeley	33 (3)	7	3 (2)	1	5	0	10 (1)	2	51 (6)	10
MF	ENG	Mike O'Grady	6	0	1	0	0	0	1	0	8	0
MF	WAL	Terry Yorath	1	0	0	0	0	0	0	0	1	0
MF	ENG	Rod Johnson	0 (1)	0	0	0	1 (1)	0	0	0	1 (2)	0
MF	SCO	Peter Lorimer	36 (1)	16	5	2	6	4	12	8	59 (1)	30
FW	ENG	Rod Belfitt	11 (3)	2	0	0	5 (1)	2	2 (2)	1	18 (6)	5
FW	ENG	Jimmy Greenhoff	35 (2)	11	3	0	7	3	10 (1)	4	55 (3)	18
FW	WAL	Dennis Hawkins	1	0	0	0	1	0	0	0	2	0
FW	ENG	Mick Jones	25	8	5	2	0	0	8	2	38	12
FW	RSA	Albert Johanneson	8 (1)	2	0	0	1	1	1 (1)	3	10 (2)	6

== Bibliography ==
- Jarred, Martin; MacDonald, Malcolm (1986). Leeds United: a complete record 1919–1986. Derby: Breedon Books Sport. ISBN 0-907969-17-8. OCLC 14977257.
