= McGifford =

McGifford is a surname. Notable people with the surname include:

- Diane McGifford (born 1945), Canadian politician
- Grahame McGifford (born 1955), English footballer
