= Bobby Campbell (Northern Irish footballer) =

Northern Irish footballer

Personal information
- Full name: Robert McFaul Campbell
- Date of birth: 13 September 1956
- Place of birth: Belfast, Northern Ireland
- Date of death: 15 November 2016 (aged 60)
- Place of death: Huddersfield, England
- Height: 6 ft 0 in (1.83 m)
- Position: Striker

Youth career
- 1972–1974: Aston Villa

Senior career*
| Years | Team | Apps | (Gls) |
| 1974–1975 | Aston Villa | 10 | (1) |
| 1975 | → Halifax Town (loan) | 15 | (0) |
| 1975–1977 | Huddersfield Town | 31 | (9) |
| 1977–1978 | Sheffield United | 37 | (11) |
| 1978 | Vancouver Whitecaps | 13 | (9) |
| 1978 | Huddersfield Town | 7 | (3) |
| 1979 | Halifax Town | 22 | (3) |
| 1979 | Brisbane City | 20 | (10) |
| 1979–1983 | Bradford City | 148 | (76) |
| 1983 | Derby County | 11 | (4) |
| 1983–1986 | Bradford City | 126 | (45) |
| 1986–1988 | Wigan Athletic | 69 | (27) |
| Total | | 509 | (198) |

International career
| 1982 | Northern Ireland | 2 | (0) |
- * Club domestic league appearances and goals

Robert McFaul Campbell (13 September 1956 – 15 November 2016) was a Northern Irish international footballer who played as a centre forward.

== Club career ==
Born in Belfast, Campbell started his career at Aston Villa, making his professional debut in April 1974. He failed to establish himself in the first team, making 10 league appearances for the club before being sold to Huddersfield Town in May 1975. He joined Sheffield United in 1977, but left the club after just one season. He briefly returned to Huddersfield Town for a second spell before signing for Halifax Town.

In December 1979, he joined Bradford City. He made over 300 appearances for the club, and became the club's all-time leading goalscorer with a total of 143 goals. Whilst at Bradford he won promotion from Division Four in the 1981–82 season and the Football League Division Three title in 1984–85, the latter of which paled into insignificance when 56 spectators were killed in a stand fire while playing Lincoln City in the final game of the season.

Campbell left Bradford in 1986 and joined Wigan Athletic, where he finished his playing career. In 1986–87, Campbell finished as Wigan's top goal scorer with 20 goals, helping the club to reach the quarter-final of the FA Cup for the first time in its history. He was the club's top scorer again with a further 16 goals in the 1987–88 season, most notably scoring a hat trick against local rivals Bolton Wanderers at Burnden Park in the first round of the League Cup.

== International career ==
In 1975, Campbell was selected to play for the Northern Ireland youth team at the European Under-18 Championship in Switzerland, but was sent home, along with teammate Bertie McMinn, after being involved in a car crash. The Irish FA subsequently banned both players from representing the country at all levels. After several attempts to overturn the decision, including a petition from supporters, the ban was eventually lifted in 1981.

In April 1982, Campbell was included in the Northern Ireland squad for the upcoming British Home Championship, and was subsequently capped twice during the tournament. He was also selected by his country for the 1982 FIFA World Cup later that year, but failed to make an appearance.

== Post-retirement ==
After retiring from football in 1988, Campbell worked as a steward at a working men's club in Huddersfield. In 2013, he was dismissed by the club after he and his wife were accused of fraud, but the charges were dropped after the case was taken to court.

On 15 November 2016, Campbell was found dead after hanging himself in his garage.

== Career statistics ==
Appearances and goals by club, season and competition
| Club | Season | League | | | FA Cup | | League Cup | | Other | | Total | |
| Club | Season | Division | Apps | Goals | Apps | Goals | Apps | Goals | Apps | Goals | Apps | Goals |
|---|---|---|---|---|---|---|---|---|---|---|---|---|
| Aston Villa | 1973–74 | Second Division | 3 | 1 | 0 | 0 | 0 | 0 | 0 | 0 | 3 | 1 |
| Aston Villa | 1974–75 | Second Division | 7 | 0 | 0 | 0 | 2 | 0 | 0 | 0 | 9 | 0 |
| Aston Villa | Total | | 10 | 1 | 0 | 0 | 2 | 0 | 0 | 0 | 12 | 1 |
| Halifax Town (loan) | 1974–75 | Third Division | 15 | 0 | 0 | 0 | 0 | 0 | 0 | 0 | 15 | 0 |
| Huddersfield Town | 1975–76 | Fourth Division | 11 | 1 | 0 | 0 | 3 | 1 | 0 | 0 | 14 | 2 |
| Huddersfield Town | 1976–77 | Fourth Division | 20 | 8 | 0 | 0 | 0 | 0 | 0 | 0 | 20 | 8 |
| Huddersfield Town | Total | | 31 | 9 | 0 | 0 | 3 | 1 | 0 | 0 | 34 | 10 |
| Sheffield United | 1977–78 | Second Division | 37 | 11 | 0 | 0 | 1 | 0 | 4 (Note: Appearances in the Anglo-Scottish Cup) | 3 | 42 | 14 |
| Vancouver Whitecaps | 1978 | NASL | 13 | 9 | 0 | 0 | 0 | 0 | 0 | 0 | 13 | 9 |
| Huddersfield Town | 1978–79 | Fourth Division | 7 | 3 | 0 | 0 | 0 | 0 | 0 | 0 | 7 | 3 |
| Halifax Town | 1978–79 | Fourth Division | 22 | 3 | 1 | 0 | 0 | 0 | 0 | 0 | 23 | 3 |
| Brisbane City | 1979 | NSL | 20 | 10 | 0 | 0 | 0 | 0 | 0 | 0 | 20 | 10 |
| Bradford City | 1979–80 | Fourth Division | 21 | 8 | 0 | 0 | 0 | 0 | 0 | 0 | 21 | 8 |
| Bradford City | 1980–81 | Fourth Division | 42 | 19 | 1 | 0 | 4 | 3 | 0 | 0 | 47 | 22 |
| Bradford City | 1981–82 | Fourth Division | 45 | 24 | 1 | 0 | 6 | 3 | 4 (Note: Appearances in the Football League Group Cup) | 2 | 56 | 29 |
| Bradford City | 1982–83 | Third Division | 40 | 25 | 4 | 2 | 5 | 3 | 4 | 3 | 53 | 33 |
| Bradford City | Total | | 148 | 76 | 6 | 2 | 15 | 9 | 8 | 5 | 177 | 92 |
| Derby County | 1983–84 | Second Division | 11 | 4 | 0 | 0 | 1 | 0 | 0 | 0 | 12 | 4 |
| Bradford City | 1983–84 | Third Division | 32 | 9 | 1 | 0 | 0 | 0 | 2 (Note: Appearances in the Football League Trophy) | 1 | 35 | 10 |
| Bradford City | 1984–85 | Third Division | 46 | 23 | 3 | 3 | 4 | 0 | 0 | 0 | 53 | 26 |
| Bradford City | 1985–86 | Second Division | 41 | 10 | 2 | 0 | 4 | 2 | 0 | 0 | 47 | 12 |
| Bradford City | 1986–87 | Second Division | 7 | 3 | 0 | 0 | 1 | 0 | 0 | 0 | 8 | 3 |
| Bradford City | Total | | 126 | 45 | 6 | 3 | 9 | 2 | 2 | 1 | 143 | 51 |
| Wigan Athletic | 1986–87 | Third Division | 35 | 16 | 5 | 4 | 0 | 0 | 5 (Note: Three appearances in the Football League Trophy, two appearances in the Third Division play-offs) | 0 | 45 | 20 |
| Wigan Athletic | 1987–88 | Third Division | 34 | 11 | 2 | 1 | 4 | 4 | 2 | 0 | 42 | 16 |
| Wigan Athletic | Total | | 69 | 27 | 7 | 5 | 4 | 4 | 7 | 0 | 87 | 36 |
| Career total | | | 509 | 198 | 20 | 10 | 35 | 16 | 21 | 9 | 585 | 233 |

== Honours ==
Bradford City

- Football League Third Division: 1984–85
