= Steve Spriggs =

English footballer

Personal information
- Full name: Stephen Spriggs
- Date of birth: 16 February 1956 (age 70)
- Place of birth: Armthorpe, Doncaster, England
- Height: 5 ft 3 in (1.60 m)
- Position: Midfielder

Senior career*
Years	Team	Apps	(Gls)
1974–1975	Huddersfield Town	4	(0)
1975–1987	Cambridge United	416	(60)
1986–1987	→ Middlesbrough (loan)	3	(0)
- * Club domestic league appearances and goals

Stephen Spriggs (born 16 February 1956) is an English former professional footballer who is mostly remembered for his 12 years at Cambridge United, where he still holds the record for the most appearances with 416.
