= Kevin Johnson (footballer) =

English footballer

Personal information
- Full name: Kevin Peter Johnson
- Date of birth: 29 August 1952 (age 74)
- Place of birth: Doncaster, England
- Position: Midfielder

Youth career
- Sheffield Wednesday

Senior career*
Years	Team	Apps	(Gls)
1970–1971	Sheffield Wednesday	1	(0)
1972–1974	Southend United	17	(1)
1973	Gillingham	1	(0)
1974	→ Workington (loan)	15	(1)
1974–1976	Hartlepool United	61	(8)
1976–1978	Huddersfield Town	81	(23)
1978–1980	Halifax Town	57	(10)
1980–1984	Hartlepool United	87	(3)
1984–198?	Gateshead		
- * Club domestic league appearances and goals

Kevin Peter Johnson (born 29 August 1952 in Doncaster) is an English former professional footballer who played as a midfielder in the Football League for Sheffield Wednesday, Southend United, Gillingham, Workington, Hartlepool United, Huddersfield Town and Halifax Town, and non-league football for Gateshead, during the 1970s and 1980s.
