= Paul Walker (footballer, born 1949) =

English footballer

Personal information
- Full name: Paul Graham Walker
- Date of birth: 3 April 1949 (age 77)
- Place of birth: Bradford, England
- Position: Midfielder

Senior career*
Years	Team	Apps	(Gls)
1968–1973	Wolverhampton Wanderers	26	(0)
1971	→ Watford (loan)	3	(0)
1972	→ Swindon Town (loan)	5	(0)
1973–1975	Peterborough United	78	(3)
1975–1976	Barnsley	13	(0)
1976	Ottawa Tigers		
1976–1977	Huddersfield Town	1	(0)
- * Club domestic league appearances and goals

Paul Graham Walker (born 3 April 1949) is a former professional footballer, who played for Wolverhampton Wanderers, Watford, Swindon Town, Peterborough United, Barnsley and Huddersfield Town. In the summer of 1976, he played abroad in Canada's National Soccer League with Ottawa Tigers.

== Sources ==
- Ian Thomas, Owen Thomas, Alan Hodgson, John Ward (2007). 99 Years and Counting: Stats and Stories. Huddersfield Town A.F.C. ISBN 978-0955728105.
