= John Turner (footballer, born 1954) =

English footballer

Personal information
- Full name: John Graham Anthony Turner
- Date of birth: 23 December 1954 (age 71)
- Place of birth: Gateshead, England
- Position: Goalkeeper

Youth career
- 1970–1972: Derby County

Senior career*
Years	Team	Apps	(Gls)
1972–1975	Derby County	0	(0)
1974	→ Doncaster Rovers (loan)	4	(0)
1974	→ Brighton & Hove Albion (loan)	0	(0)
1975	→ Huddersfield Town (loan)	1	(0)
1975–1978	Reading	31	(0)
1978–1980	Torquay United	76	(0)
1980–1983	Chesterfield	132	(0)
1983–1984	Torquay United	34	(0)
1984	Weymouth		
1984	Burnley	0	(0)
1984–1986	Peterborough United	60	(0)
Total		338	(0)
- * Club domestic league appearances and goals

John Graham Anthony Turner (born 23 December 1954 in Gateshead) is a former professional footballer, who played in the Football League as a goalkeeper for Doncaster Rovers, Huddersfield Town, Reading, Torquay United, Chesterfield, and Peterborough United. He began his career with Derby County, but never appeared for the first team, and spent time with Brighton & Hove Albion and Burnley, again without appearing for the first team, and with non-league club Weymouth. His professional career ended when he broke his leg with 10 minutes left in an FA Cup tie against Leeds United; Peterborough hung on for a 1–0 upset win.

== Honours ==
Individual

- Toulon Tournament Best Goalkeeper: 1974
