= Ron Hughes (footballer, born 1955) =

English footballer

Ronald Hardwick Hughes (born 17 August 1955) is an English former professional footballer from Workington who played as a goalkeeper for Workington in the Football League during the 1975–76 season.
