= Bob Mountain =

English footballer (born 1956)

Personal information
- Full name: Robert Brian Mountain
- Date of birth: 11 September 1956 (age 70)
- Place of birth: Wombwell, England
- Position: Forward

Youth career
- 1972–1973: Huddersfield Town

Senior career*
Years	Team	Apps	(Gls)
1973–1974	Huddersfield Town	1	(0)
–	Frickley Colliery		
–	Mexborough Town		
–	Bridlington Trinity		
1980–1981	Grantham Town		
–	Matlock Town		
–	Alfreton Town		
1986–19??	Stafford Rangers	37	(13)
- * Club domestic league appearances and goals

Robert Brian Mountain (born 11 September 1956) is an English former professional footballer born in Wombwell, Yorkshire, who played in the Football League for Huddersfield Town in the 1970s. Mountain went on to play non-league football for Frickley Colliery, Mexborough Town, Bridlington Trinity, Grantham Town, for whom he scored 15 goals from 39 games in all competitions, Alfreton Town, with 47 goals from 82 games in all competitions, Matlock Town, with whom he was Northern Premier League leading scorer in the 1982–83 season, and Stafford Rangers, for whom he scored the winning goal in the Conference League Cup in 1985–86.
