= Nigel Davey =

English footballer

Personal information
- Full name: Nigel Geoffrey Davey
- Date of birth: 20 June 1946 (age 80)
- Place of birth: Garforth, England
- Height: 5 ft 9 in (1.75 m)
- Position: Left-back

Youth career
- Great Preston Juniors
- 1964–1965: Leeds United

Senior career*
Years	Team	Apps	(Gls)
1965–1974	Leeds United	14	(0)
1974–1975	Rotherham United	0	(0)
- Garforth United
Total		14	(0)

Managerial career
- Garforth United (player-manager)
- * Club domestic league appearances and goals

Nigel Geoffrey Davey (born 20 June 1946) is an English former footballer who played in the Football League for Leeds United.

== Career statistics ==
Appearances and goals by club, season and competition
Club	Season	League			FA Cup		League Cup		Continental		Other		Total	
Club	Season	Division	Apps	Goals	Apps	Goals	Apps	Goals	Apps	Goals	Apps	Goals	Apps	Goals
Leeds United	1965–66	First Division	0	0	0	0	1	0	0	0	0	0	1	0
Leeds United	1966–67	First Division	0	0	0	0	0	0	0	0	0	0	0	0
Leeds United	1967–68	First Division	2	0	0	0	0	0	0	0	0	0	0	0
Leeds United	1968–69	First Division	0	0	0	0	0	0	0	0	0	0	0	0
Leeds United	1969–70	First Division	5	0	0	0	0	0	0	0	0	0	5	0
Leeds United	1970–71	First Division	7	0	1	0	0	0	4 (Note: Appearances in the Inter-Cities Fairs Cup)	0	0	0	12	0
Leeds United	1971–72	First Division	0	0	0	0	1	0	1 (Note: Appearances in the UEFA Cup)	0	0	0	2	0
Leeds United	1972–73	First Division	0	0	0	0	0	0	0	0	0	0	0	0
Leeds United	1973–74	First Division	0	0	0	0	0	0	1	0	0	0	1	0
Leeds United	Total		14	0	1	0	2	0	6	0	0	0	23	0
Rotherham United	1974–75	Fourth Division	0	0	0	0	0	0	–		0	0	0	0
Career total			14	0	1	0	2	0	6	0	0	0	23	0
