= Paul Cooper (footballer, born 1957) =

English footballer

Personal information
- Full name: Paul Terence Cooper
- Date of birth: 12 July 1957 (age 69)
- Place of birth: Birmingham, England
- Date of death: 28 February 2020
- Position: Defender

Youth career
- Huddersfield Town

Senior career*
Years	Team	Apps	(Gls)
1976–1977	Huddersfield Town	2	(0)
1977–1978	Grimsby Town	3	(0)
–	Nuneaton Borough		
- * Club domestic league appearances and goals

Paul Terence Cooper (born 12 July 1957 in Birmingham) is an English former professional footballer who played as a defender in the Football League for Huddersfield Town and Grimsby Town.
