= Peter Oliver (footballer) =

Scottish footballer

Personal information
- Full name: Peter Francis Raeside Oliver
- Date of birth: 14 August 1948 (age 78)
- Place of birth: Dunfermline, Scotland
- Position: Defender

Senior career*
Years	Team	Apps	(Gls)
1969–1974	Heart of Midlothian	78	(0)
1974–1976	York City	41	(0)
1976–1977	Huddersfield Town	41	(1)

International career
1971	Scotland U23	1	(0)
- * Club domestic league appearances and goals

Peter Francis Raeside Oliver (born 14 August 1948 in Dunfermline) is a former professional footballer, who played as a defender for Heart of Midlothian, York City & Huddersfield Town.
