= Chris Wood (footballer, born 1955) =

English footballer

Personal information
- Full name: Christopher Charles Wood
- Date of birth: 15 May 1955 (age 71)
- Place of birth: Penistone, England
- Position: Goalkeeper

Senior career*
Years	Team	Apps	(Gls)
1972–1975	Huddersfield Town	7	(0)
1973	→ Barnsley (loan)	1	(0)
1974	→ Doncaster Rovers (loan)	4	(0)
- * Club domestic league appearances and goals

Christopher Charles Wood (born 15 May 1955) is an English former professional footballer, who played for Huddersfield Town, Barnsley and Doncaster Rovers as a goalkeeper.
