= Grahame McGifford =

English footballer

Personal information
- Full name: Grahame Leslie McGifford
- Date of birth: 1 May 1955 (age 71)
- Place of birth: Carshalton, England
- Height: 5 ft 7 in (1.70 m)
- Position: Right-back

Senior career*
Years	Team	Apps	(Gls)
1972–1976	Huddersfield Town	42	(0)
1976–1977	Hull City	1	(0)
1977–1978	Port Vale	20	(0)
- Northwich Victoria
Total		63+	(0+)
- * Club domestic league appearances and goals

Grahame Leslie McGifford (born 1 May 1955) is an English former footballer, who played at right-back for Huddersfield Town, Hull City, Port Vale and Northwich Victoria.

== Career ==
McGifford started his career with Huddersfield Town in 1972. Manager Ian Greaves handed him his Second Division debut as a substitute in the 1972–73 season after which the "Terriers" were relegated into the Third Division. He made 17 appearances in 1973–74 and 24 appearances in 1974–75, as Bobby Collins's only season in charge at Leeds Road saw the club slip into the Fourth Division for the first time. McGifford lost his first-team place under new boss Tom Johnston and played only three games in 1975–76. McGifford started Hull City's opening match of the 1976–77 season, an Anglo-Scottish Cup tie against Middlesbrough, but suffered an injury that kept him out for several subsequent matches. By the time McGifford recovered, young full-back Peter Daniel had established himself in the side. He featured just once in the Second Division for Bobby Collins's "Tigers". He departed Boothferry Park for Vale Park in June 1977, when he dropped down a division to sign for Port Vale. A regular in the first half of the 1977–78 season, he made 20 league and seven cup appearances for the "Valiants", keeping his first-team place despite manager Roy Sproson being replaced by Bobby Smith. However, McGifford suffered a serious knee injury in December 1977, and was given a free transfer in May 1978 to Northern Premier League side Northwich Victoria. He later entered the finance industry and took up residence in Stockport.

== Career statistics ==
Appearances and goals by club, season and competition
Club	Season	League			FA Cup		League Cup		Total	
Club	Season	Division	Apps	Goals	Apps	Goals	Apps	Goals	Apps	Goals
Huddersfield Town	1972–73	Second Division	1	0	0	0	0	0	1	0
Huddersfield Town	1973–74	Third Division	16	0	0	0	1	0	17	0
Huddersfield Town	1974–75	Third Division	22	0	1	0	1	0	24	0
Huddersfield Town	1975–76	Fourth Division	3	0	0	0	0	0	3	0
Huddersfield Town	Total		42	0	1	0	2	0	45	0
Hull City	1976–77	Second Division	1	0	0	0	1	0	2	0
Port Vale	1977–78	Third Division	20	0	4	0	3	0	27	0
Career total			63	0	5	0	6	0	74	0
