= Neil Hague (footballer) =

English footballer (1949–2022)

Personal information
- Date of birth: 1 December 1949
- Place of birth: Thurcroft, Rotherham, England
- Date of death: 24 July 2022 (aged 72)
- Position: Defender

Senior career*
Years	Team	Apps	(Gls)
1967–1972	Rotherham United	145	(2)
1971–1974	Plymouth Argyle	98	(15)
1974–1976	AFC Bournemouth	89	(7)
1976–1977	Huddersfield Town	25	(2)
1977–1979	Darlington	80	(4)
Total		437	(30)
- * Club domestic league appearances and goals

Neil Hague (1 December 1949 – 24 July 2022) was an English professional footballer, who played as a defender for Rotherham United, Plymouth Argyle, AFC Bournemouth, Huddersfield Town, and Darlington.

In 1980 he was contracted to play with the American Soccer League expansion team the Phoenix Fire, but the team folded in pre-season. Hague then moved to the Columbus Magic. His final club as a player was the Los Angeles Aztecs, part-owned by Elton John. Before returning to the UK, he ran soccer camps in California.
