= Billy McGinley =

Scottish footballer (born 1954)

Personal information
- Full name: William David McGinley
- Date of birth: 12 November 1954 (age 71)
- Place of birth: Dumfries, Scotland

Senior career*
Years	Team	Apps	(Gls)
1972–1973	Leeds United	1	(0)
1974–1975	Huddersfield Town	15	(1)
1975–1977	Bradford City	60	(11)
1977–1978	Crewe Alexandra	38	(2)
- * Club domestic league appearances and goals

William David McGinley (born 12 November 1954) is a former professional footballer, who played for Leeds United, Huddersfield Town, Bradford City and Crewe Alexandra.

== Career ==
Billy McGinley was at Leeds United when the club were managed by Don Revie and consistent trophy contenders in England and in Europe. In a side packed with seasoned regular internationals, the teenage McGinley was unable to establish himself in the first team. He made a single league appearance in season 1972/73.

Aged 20 he found regular first team football. He spent two seasons at Bradford City from 1975 where he made 60 league appearances in which he found the net 11 times. Bradford enjoyed some success in McGinley's time. In his first season the fourth division side reached the 1975–76 FA Cup quarter finals. Entering the competition at the first round, Bradford won all five of their first five ties without need of replay before succumbing to that season's eventual winners, Southampton. In McGinley's second season, 1976–77 in English football, Bradford finished fourth to earn promotion to the third division.

He then spent a season at Crewe Alexandra where was again a regular. In his 38 league appearances he scored twice. Crewe were drawn against Bradford in the first round of the 1977–78 FA Cup. McGinley had the satisfaction of his side progressing with a 1–0 away win against his previous club.

Aged 23, McGinley then left professional football, briefly serving Congleton Town before joining Whitchurch Alport. He followed Manager Peter Gowans to Nantwich Town in the summer of 1982 as club captain.

== Honours ==
- Bradford City: 1976/77 Fourth Division promotion
