= Wayne Goldthorpe =

English footballer

Personal information
- Full name: Wayne Goldthorpe
- Date of birth: 19 September 1957 (age 69)
- Place of birth: Staincross, Barnsley, England
- Position: Striker

Senior career*
Years	Team	Apps	(Gls)
1975–1978	Huddersfield Town	26	(7)
1976-1977	→ Hartlepool United (loan)	1	(0)
1977	→ Bolton Wanderers (loan)	0	(0)
1977	→ Leeds United (loan)	0	(0)
1977	→ Arsenal (loan)	0	(0)
1978–1979	Hartlepool United	47	(8)
1979–1980	Crewe Alexandra.	1	(0)
- * Club domestic league appearances and goals

Wayne Goldthorpe (born 19 September 1957 in Staincross, near Barnsley, Yorkshire) is a former professional footballer who played for Huddersfield Town, Hartlepool United and Crewe Alexandra. He also had loan spells at Bolton and Arsenal before being forced to retire from football due to ulcerative colitis. He then had great success in the pub and hotel trade in the Lake District before buying a greetings card business in Grange over Sands. He sold his businesses and has now retired to Morecambe with his longtime partner, where they collect antiques as a hobby.
