= Dave Lyon (footballer, born 1951) =

English footballer

Personal information
- Full name: David George Lyon
- Date of birth: 18 January 1951
- Place of birth: Bowden, Cheshire, England
- Date of death: 21 April 1999 (aged 48)
- Place of death: Chesterton, England
- Position: Defender

Youth career
- –: Bury

Senior career*
Years	Team	Apps	(Gls)
1968–1971	Bury	71	(0)
1971–1974	Huddersfield Town	25	(0)
1973–1974	→ Mansfield Town (loan)	2	(0)
1974–1977	Cambridge United	85	(11)
1977–1978	Northampton Town	6	(0)
–	Cambridge City		
- * Club domestic league appearances and goals

David George Lyon (18 January 1951 – 29 April 1999) was an English professional footballer who played in the Football League as a defender for Bury, Huddersfield Town, Mansfield Town, Cambridge United and Northampton Town during the 1960s and 1970s.
