= Barry Endean =

English footballer (born 1946)

Personal information
- Full name: Barry Endean
- Date of birth: 22 March 1946 (age 80)
- Place of birth: Chester-le-Street, England
- Position: Striker

Youth career
- Everton

Senior career*
Years	Team	Apps	(Gls)
1968–1970	Watford	77	(28)
1970–1971	Charlton Athletic	27	(1)
1971–1974	Blackburn Rovers	79	(18)
1974–1976	Huddersfield Town	12	(1)
1975	→ Workington (loan)	8	(2)
1976–1977	Hartlepool United	25	(5)
- * Club domestic league appearances and goals

Barry Endean (born 22 March 1946) is an English former professional footballer. He signed for Everton as a youngster but was released by the club. He returned to the professional game six years later with Watford and went on to play for Charlton Athletic, Blackburn Rovers, Huddersfield Town, Workington and Hartlepool United.

== Youth career ==
Born in Chester-le-Street, County Durham, Endean left school at the age of 15 with no plans to become a professional footballer, choosing instead to start an apprenticeship as a welder. He also played for a junior football team in Pelton Fell, where he was spotted by a scout from Football League First Division club Everton. The Liverpool-based club signed him to a youth contract, but after four days, unable to settle in the city, he asked to be released from his contract. He returned to his native North-East England, where he resumed work as a welder and played only local amateur football.

== Senior career ==
By 1968, Endean was playing for a pub team, for whom he was a prolific goalscorer. In September of that year, he was spotted playing for an amateur team in a public park and was invited to sign for Watford of the Football League Third Division. He was soon a regular in the club's first team and, in January of the following year, he was part of the Watford team which held Manchester United, the reigning European Cup-holders, to a 1–1 draw in front of over 60,000 fans at Old Trafford in the third round of the 1968–69 FA Cup. He also scored the winning goal for the club against Liverpool in the sixth round of the 1969–70 FA Cup at Vicarage Road on 21 February 1970, covered by BBC Television's Match of the Day. In total he scored 28 goals for the "Hornets" in 77 Football League games, and helped the club gain promotion to the Second Division in the 1968–69 season.

In February 1971, Endean was transferred to Charlton Athletic of the Second Division, where he spent eight months. He made 27 League appearances for the London-based club but only scored one goal. He dropped back down to the Third Division when he joined Blackburn Rovers in October 1971. He had a more successful spell with the Ewood Park-based club, registering 18 League goals in 75 appearances. In March 1975 he moved to Huddersfield Town, but played only 12 times for the club, scoring a single goal. In late 1975 he was loaned out to Workington of the Fourth Division. In March of the following year, he moved on to Hartlepool United, where he finished his professional career with a spell of 25 League games, during which he scored five goals.
