= Dave Smith (footballer, born 1950) =

English footballer

Personal information
- Full name: David Bryan Smith
- Date of birth: 11 December 1950 (age 75)
- Place of birth: Sheffield, England
- Position: Striker

Senior career*
Years	Team	Apps	(Gls)
1971–1974	Huddersfield Town	34	(7)
1973	→ Stockport County (loan)	8	(0)
1974	→ Halifax Town (loan)	13	(4)
1974–1975	Cambridge United	17	(3)
1975–1976	Hartlepool United	42	(13)
- Gateshead United
- * Club domestic league appearances and goals

David Bryan Smith (born 11 December 1950) is a former professional footballer, who played for Huddersfield Town, Stockport County, Halifax Town, Cambridge United, Hartlepool United and Gateshead United.
