= Mick Butler (footballer) =

English footballer (born 1951)

Personal information
- Date of birth: 27 January 1951 (age 75)
- Place of birth: Barnsley, England
- Position: Striker

Senior career*
Years	Team	Apps	(Gls)
- Worsbrough Bridge MW
1972–1976	Barnsley	120	(57)
1976–1978	Huddersfield Town	79	(22)
1978–1980	AFC Bournemouth	69	(19)
1980–1982	Bury	82	(15)
- * Club domestic league appearances and goals

Mick Butler (born 27 January 1951 in Barnsley) is an English former professional footballer who made 350 appearances in the Football League playing as a striker for Barnsley, Huddersfield Town, AFC Bournemouth and Bury during the 1970s and 1980s.
