= Paul Smith (footballer, born 1954) =

English footballer

Personal information
- Full name: Paul William Smith
- Date of birth: 15 October 1954 (age 72)
- Place of birth: Thorne, England
- Position: Midfielder

Youth career
- Huddersfield Town

Senior career*
Years	Team	Apps	(Gls)
1972–1974	Huddersfield Town	2	(0)
1974–1976	Cambridge United	38	(3)
Total		40	(3)
- * Club domestic league appearances and goals

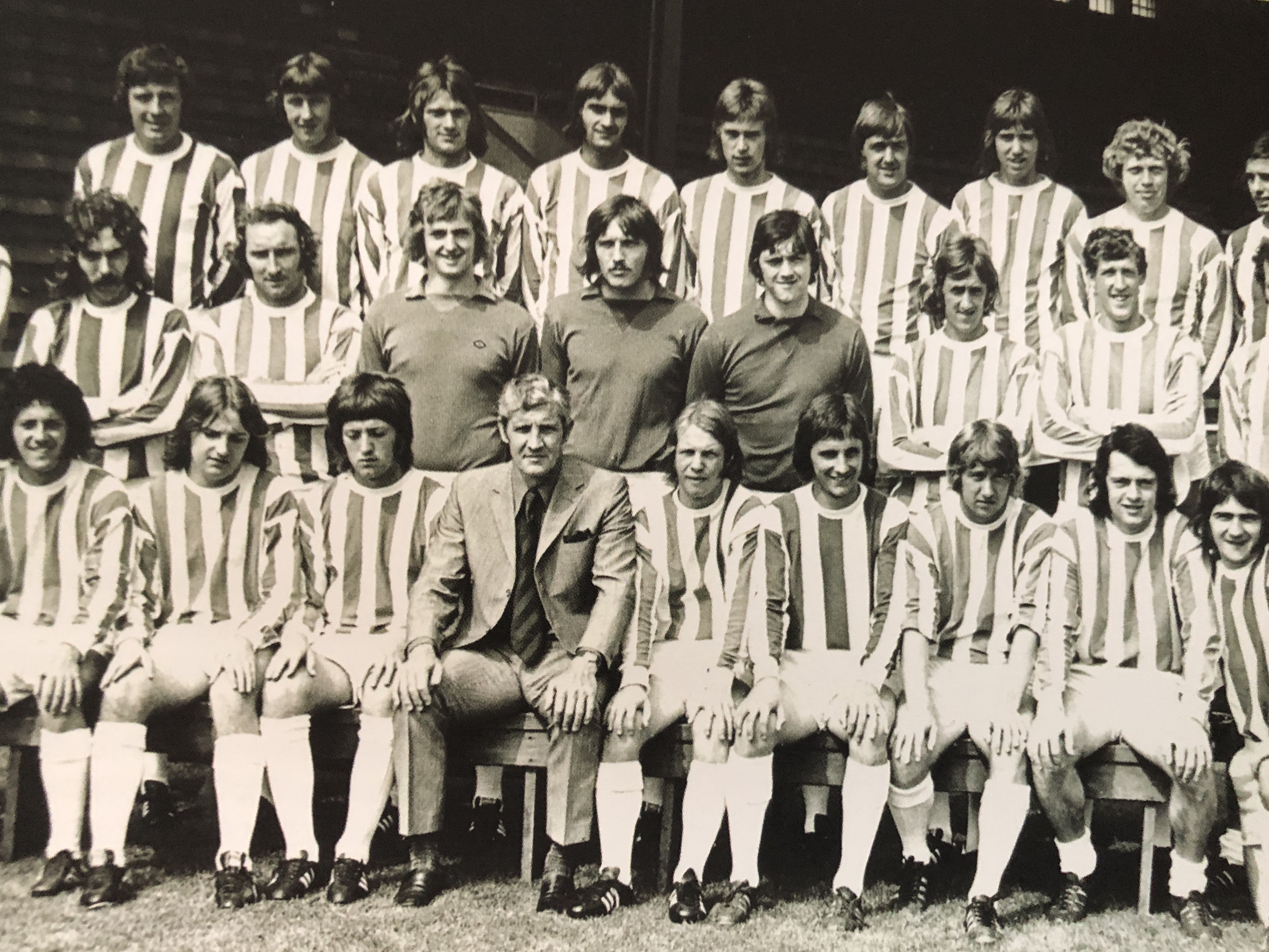

Paul William Smith (born 15 October 1954 in Thorne, Doncaster) is a former professional footballer who played as a midfielder in the Football League for Huddersfield Town and Cambridge United.
