= Brian O'Neil (footballer, born 1944) =

English footballer

Personal information
- Full name: Brian O'Neil
- Date of birth: 4 January 1944 (age 82)
- Place of birth: Bedlington, England
- Position: Midfielder

Senior career*
Years	Team	Apps	(Gls)
1962–1970	Burnley	235	(22)
1970–1974	Southampton	149	(16)
1974–1976	Huddersfield Town	61	(3)
?	Bideford A.F.C.	?	(?)
- * Club domestic league appearances and goals

Brian O'Neil (born 4 January 1944 in Bedlington) is a former footballer who played for Burnley, Southampton and Huddersfield Town in the 1960s and 1970s.
