= Steve Baines =

English footballer and referee

Personal information
- Full name: Stephen John Baines
- Date of birth: 23 June 1954 (age 72)
- Place of birth: Newark, Nottinghamshire, England
- Height: 6 ft 0 in (1.83 m)
- Position: Defender

Senior career*
Years	Team	Apps	(Gls)
1972–1973	Nottingham Forest	2	(0)
1975–1978	Huddersfield Town	114	(10)
1978–1980	Bradford City	99	(17)
1980–1982	Walsall	48	(5)
1981	→ Bury (loan)	7	(0)
1982–1983	Scunthorpe United	38	(1)
1983–1987	Chesterfield	133	(9)
Total		432	(42)
- * Club domestic league appearances and goals

Stephen John Baines (born 23 June 1954) is an English former footballer and later a referee in the Football League. Born in Newark, Nottinghamshire, during his refereeing career he resided in Chesterfield, Derbyshire. He is the only referee in the League's history to have had a significant career previously as a professional player.

== Playing career ==
Baines started his career with nearby Nottingham Forest, and made his debut in the 1972–73 season, but only played twice before being transferred to Huddersfield Town. He made over one hundred appearances for that club before moving to local rivals Bradford City in 1977. After 99 league games for them he departed to Walsall. There was a loan spell at Bury before he returned on a permanent transfer to Walsall. A final move to Chesterfield, where he spent the final years of his League career as player/coach, ended in 1987, after which he played briefly for various non-League clubs.

At the close of his playing career he had made almost 450 League appearances. He had generally operated as a centre-half, scoring 42 goals – a good record for this position. In the period from 1979–80 onwards he was sent off once, while on loan at Bury in January 1982.

== Refereeing career ==
Baines remained in Chesterfield and worked in insurance. In a rare move for an ex-player he soon took up refereeing. He reached the Panel Leagues and became a Football League assistant in 1994. After just one year he was promoted to the Referees List. Only one other referee had ever been promoted that quickly – former Scottish League referee Joe Timmons, in 1987. Only two other referees – Bob Matthewson and John Lloyd – had previous professional playing experience but the pair only made five League appearances between them.

Baines had made the List after less than ten years refereeing. However he was still able to serve eight years as a Football League referee during which he had a low rate of red and yellow cards. He handled matches involving most of his former clubs although not Chesterfield, in line with League policy.

== Honours ==
Chesterfield

- Football League Fourth Division: 1984–85
