= Mick Fairclough =

Irish footballer (born 1952)

Personal information
- Full name: Michael Joseph Fairclough
- Date of birth: 22 October 1952 (age 74)
- Place of birth: Annagassan, County Louth, Ireland
- Positions: Midfielder; striker

Senior career*
Years	Team	Apps	(Gls)
1970–1971	Drogheda	14	(1)
1971–1975	Huddersfield Town	35	(2)
1979–1980	CIE/Transport		
1980–1983	Dundalk	104	(48)
1984–1986	Drogheda United	32	(11)
1986	Sligo Rovers	1	(0)
1986	Newry Town		

International career
1982	Republic of Ireland	2	(0)
- * Club domestic league appearances and goals

Michael Joseph Fairclough (born 22 October 1952) was an Irish professional footballer who played as a midfielder for Drogheda United, Dundalk and Huddersfield Town.

Mick Fairclough's scoring debut for Dundalk in March 1980 was a remarkable comeback after being told five years earlier that his football career was over due to serious knee injuries. He began his career with Drogheda United and moved to Huddersfield Town in 1971, where he made 39 appearances and scored four goals before injuries forced him out of English football.

Returning to Ireland, he underwent extensive knee treatment and eventually resumed playing at a lower level before being signed by Dundalk. He quickly impressed, scoring in his first game and helping the team secure a spot in European competition. Over the next four years, he became a key player, winning major trophies, becoming top scorer, and scoring memorable goals—including one against Tottenham in the European Cup Winners’ Cup.

His performances earned him a place on the Irish national team for a South American tour in 1982. After Dundalk's manager left, Fairclough returned to Drogheda, where he had a strong individual season despite the team's relegation.

== Career ==
Fairclough started his football career with Drogheda Youths and won an FAI Youth Cup medal in 1970 scoring in the replay of the final. At age 18, he played in the 1971 FAI Cup Final with Drogheda who lost to Limerick after a replay. This qualified Drogheda for the Blaxnit Cup where Drogheda lost on penalties to eventual winners Linfield.

Fairclough was bought by Huddersfield Town (who were then in the English Premier Division) in August 1971 and made his first team debut against Wolves in October 1971. He made 20 appearances in the 1971/72 season including games against Arsenal, Chelsea, Crystal Palace, Everton, Spurs & Wolves. He also represented Ireland in the International match against the West German Olympic team, and scored the third goal in a 3-0 win.

Fairclough received a serious leg injury against Walsall on 29 March 1973 and this ultimately ended his career prematurely in 1974.

He was out of football for 6 years and then made a comeback in the League of Ireland with Dundalk after receiving treatment from Bobby McGregor the renowned Northern Ireland Physio.

His first League of Ireland game in nearly a decade came at Glenmalure Park on 2 March 1980 when he came off the bench and scored the equaliser for the Lilywhites. This goal helped secure second place in the 1979–80 League of Ireland season which meant qualification for the 1980–81 UEFA Cup. Fairclough made his European debut against F.C. Porto in the Estádio das Antas on 17 September 1980. That season he scored the winner in the semi-final of the FAI Cup and scored in the Final against Sligo Rovers.

Fairclough played for Dundalk for a further 4 years where he was top scorer for 3 consecutive seasons during which time he won FAI Cup and League medals. He also scored 2 goals in the 1981–82 European Cup Winners' Cup against Fram Reykjavik. He then scored the equalising goal against the great Tottenham Hotspur team in the dramatic 1-1 draw in Oriel Park in the next round of the 1981 European Cup Winners Cup.

He won two full International caps for Ireland in 1982 after his successful comeback from injury.

In 1984, he left Oriel Park to return to Drogheda United where he started his career and finished playing there in 1986.

== Honours ==
- League of Ireland
  - Dundalk F.C. 1981–82
- FAI Cup
  - Dundalk F.C. 1981
- League of Ireland Cup
  - Dundalk F.C. 1980–81
- President's Cup: 2
  - Dundalk F.C. 1980–81, 1981–82

== Sources ==
- McGarrigle, Stephen (1996). The Complete Who's Who of Irish International Football, 1945–96. ISBN 9781851588947.
- Keane, Paul (2010). Gods Vs Mortals. ISBN 9780956359841. OCLC 751863344.
