= Lloyd Maitland =

English footballer

Personal information
- Full name: Lloyd Curtis Maitland
- Date of birth: 21 March 1957 (age 69)
- Place of birth: Coleshill, Warwickshire, England
- Position: Midfielder

Senior career*
Years	Team	Apps	(Gls)
1974–1977	Huddersfield Town	39	(2)
1977–1979	Darlington	71	(6)
- * Club domestic league appearances and goals

Lloyd Curtis Maitland (born 21 March 1957) is an English former professional footballer, who played for Huddersfield Town and Darlington.

Born in England, Maitland is of Jamaican descent. A winger, was the first black player to play for Huddersfield Town's first team in 1975. He also played in Town's FA Youth Cup Final team versus Tottenham Hotspur in 1974.
