= Brian Marshall (footballer) =

English footballer

Personal information
- Full name: Brian Marshall
- Date of birth: 20 September 1954 (age 72)
- Place of birth: Bolton on Dearne, England
- Position: Defender

Senior career*
| Years | Team | Apps | (Gls) |
| 1972–1975 | Huddersfield Town | 32 | (0) |
| 1974 | → Scunthorpe United (loan) | 3 | (0) |
- * Club domestic league appearances and goals

Brian Marshall (born 20 September 1954 in Bolton on Dearne, West Riding of Yorkshire) is a former professional footballer, who played as a defender for Huddersfield Town and Scunthorpe United.
