= Graham Pugh =

English footballer

Personal information
- Full name: John Graham Pugh
- Date of birth: 12 February 1948 (age 78)
- Place of birth: Chester, England
- Position: Midfielder

Senior career*
Years	Team	Apps	(Gls)
1965–1972	Sheffield Wednesday	142	(7)
1972–1975	Huddersfield Town	80	(1)
1975–1977	Chester	69	(3)
1977–1980	Barnsley	130	(8)
1980–1981	Scunthorpe United	55	(0)
–	Matlock Town		
Total		476	(19)
- * Club domestic league appearances and goals

John Graham Pugh (born 12 February 1948 in Chester, Cheshire) is an English former professional footballer who played in the Football League as a midfielder for Sheffield Wednesday, Huddersfield Town, Chester, Barnsley and Scunthorpe United in the 1960s, 1970s and 1980s. He played in the 1966 FA Cup final for Sheffield Wednesday, losing to Everton.

== Honours ==
Sheffield Wednesday

- FA Cup runner-up: 1965–66
