= Alan Sweeney =

Scottish footballer

Personal information
- Full name: Alan Sweeney
- Date of birth: 31 October 1956 (age 69)
- Place of birth: Glasgow, Scotland
- Position: Defender

Youth career
- 1972–1975: Huddersfield Town

Senior career*
Years	Team	Apps	(Gls)
1974–1978	Huddersfield Town	66	(0)
1978–1979	Emley	?	(?)
1979–1982	Hartlepool United	97	(2)
- * Club domestic league appearances and goals

Alan Sweeney (born 31 October 1956 in Glasgow, Scotland) is a former professional footballer, who played for Huddersfield Town, Hartlepool United and Emley.
