= Rod Belfitt =

English footballer

Personal information
- Full name: Roderick Michael Belfitt
- Date of birth: 30 October 1945 (age 81)
- Place of birth: Doncaster, England
- Height: 5 ft 11 1/2 in (1.82 m)
- Position: Striker

Youth career
- Retford Town

Senior career*
Years	Team	Apps	(Gls)
1964–1971	Leeds United	75	(17)
1971–1972	Ipswich Town	40	(13)
1972–1973	Everton	16	(2)
1973–1975	Sunderland	39	(4)
1975	→ Fulham (loan)	6	(1)
1975–1976	Huddersfield Town	34	(8)
?-?	Worksop Town	?	(?)
Total		210	(45)
- * Club domestic league appearances and goals

Roderick Michael Belfitt (born 30 October 1945) is a former professional footballer who played for a number of English football teams. His family lived in South Africa and India before settling in Doncaster, where he later played football for amateur side Doncaster United. After a short period at Arsenal he returned to Doncaster United. Later, after signing for another amateur team Retford Town, Belfitt turned professional in July 1963 and signeď for Leeds United.

== Career ==
=== Leeds United ===
Belfitt made his first team debut at Huddersfield on 23 September 1964 scoring the winning goal. With several Leeds forwards injured Belfitt was given a six-game run in the first team where he scored three times before being dropped by Don Revie. Appearances were limited until the 1966–67 season when he became a regular in February 1967. An Inter-Cities Fairs Cup semi-final first-leg game against Kilmarnock saw Belfitt scoring three goals in the opening 30 minutes in a 4–2 victory. Belfitt appeared in the goalless second leg and the two-legged final 0–2 defeat by Dynamo Zagreb. He saw more football the following season including a substitute appearance in the 1968 Football League Cup Final against Arsenal, and he also played as a substitute in the first leg of the 1968 Inter-Cities Fairs Cup Final as Leeds defeated Ferencváros on aggregate.

The following season (1968–69) Leeds won the league title but Belfitt was restricted to eight appearances (two of which were as substitute) but his three goals secured vital victories against Ipswich Town and Sunderland. Belfitt made even fewer appearances in 1969–70 with only a single league and two cup goals in 11 appearances. During 1970–71 Belfitt played more often with ten starts and 11 appearances as substitute yielding four goals. Injuries to Mick Jones and Allan Clarke saw Belfitt picked regularly but scoring just one goal in 16 appearances. He was dropped when Jones returned but following another injury a week later, Belfitt was not picked and promptly handed in a transfer request being signed by Bobby Robson at Ipswich Town for £55,000. Belfitt's last game was as a substitute away to Manchester United on 30 October 1971 (his 26th birthday).

During his eight years at Leeds Belfitt scored 17 goals from 75 league appearances with a further 16 cup goals from 53 games.

=== Ipswich Town ===
Belfitt was successful from the start, scoring in his first two games for his new club (against Wolverhampton Wanderers on 6 November 1971 and Crystal Palace) and finished the season as equal leading scorer with 7 goals in 26 games equal with Mick Hill. Belfitt made a fine start to the following season with a goal against his old club Leeds featuring amongst them. A ninth goal was scored in a 2–2 draw at Everton on 28 October impressing manager Harry Catterick to make an offer for the striker. Belfitt moved to Merseyside on 30 October 1972, his 27th birthday, with David Johnson making the move from Everton in the opposite direction. Belfitt was valued at £65,000 in this deal.

Belfitt scored a total of 19 goals in 46 league and cup games for Ipswich.

=== Everton ===
Before Belfitt's move to Everton, he was invited to play for the Civil Service first eleven after a disappointing goal return from their attack. Belfitt's first game for Everton was away in a 1–0 defeat by Crystal Palace followed by a home game where he scored against Manchester City although Everton lost 3–2. Belfitt is possibly unique in scoring two consecutive goals for different teams in consecutive Everton home games having scored for Ipswich. After 17 games and three goals Belfitt as sold to Sunderland by new manager Billy Bingham for £70,000.

=== Sunderland ===
Belfitt spent a year at Sunderland scoring four goals in 24 appearances. His lack of goals is partly explained by being deployed with some success at centre half. Within a year Belfitt was transfer listed and in November 1974 spent a brief period on loan at Fulham scoring a single goal in six games. Belfitt was transferred in February 1975 to Huddersfield Town managed by former Leeds United teammate Bobby Collins.

=== Huddersfield Town ===
Belfitt had joined a struggling Third Division side and was unable to help them stave off relegation to the Fourth Division (then the bottom tier of the Football League). He scored eight goals in 34 appearances before moving to non-league football in June 1975.

After playing amateur football for Worksop Town, Frickley Athletic and Bentley Victoria, Belfitt worked as a draughtsman and a financial adviser.

== Honours ==
Leeds United

- Football League Cup: 1967–68
- Inter-Cities Fairs Cup: 1967–68
