= John Dungworth =

English footballer and coach

Personal information
- Full name: John Henry Dungworth
- Date of birth: 30 March 1955 (age 71)
- Place of birth: Rotherham, England
- Height: 6 ft 0 in (1.83 m)
- Position: Striker

Youth career
- 1969–1972: Huddersfield Town

Senior career*
Years	Team	Apps	(Gls)
1972–1975	Huddersfield Town	23	(1)
1974	→ Barnsley (loan)	3	(1)
1975–1977	Oldham Athletic	4	(0)
1976	→ Rochdale (loan)	14	(3)
1977–1980	Aldershot	105	(58)
1980–1982	Shrewsbury Town	86	(17)
1982	→ Hereford United (loan)	7	(3)
1982–1984	Mansfield Town	56	(16)
1984–1988	Rotherham United	186	(16)
Total		484	(115)
- * Club domestic league appearances and goals

John Henry Dungworth (born 30 March 1955) is an English former professional footballer and coach.

== Career ==
Born in Rotherham, then in the West Riding of Yorkshire, England, Dungworth began his playing career at Huddersfield Town, where he signed schoolboy forms in 1969, and scored on his first-team début against Middlesbrough in 1972. He was then transferred to Oldham Athletic in 1975 followed by a successful spell at Aldershot, where he scored 66 goals in 118 games. In 1977–78 he scored 23 goals in 45 league games and was voted Supporters Player of the Year. The following season he was ever present, scoring 26 times to break the all time Shots record for league goals in a season. However some of his best performances in 1978–79 were in the FA Cup where Aldershot lost in a 5th Round Replay, with Dungworth scoring 8 times in the club's cup run to make him the second highest scorer in the country with 34 goals. He won the Golden Boot Award for being the leading marksman in the Fourth Division. He joined Shrewsbury Town in October 1979, a Football League Tribunal setting the fee at £170,000, a club record fee for Aldershot. At Shrewsbury, he struggled to repeat his past scoring records. Later he moved into the back four and ended his career as a centre-half at his home town club Rotherham United.

Since he ended his playing career, he has been a coach at Sheffield United and manager of Leeds United's academy. Subsequently, he rejoined Huddersfield Town, initially as reserve team coach, and then being appointed First Team Coach in December 2006, when Terry Yorath resigned due to ill health. He left on 3 April 2008, announced as by 'mutual consent', following the departure of manager Andy Ritchie two days earlier. He joined Sheffield Wednesday in early 2009 with primary responsibility for coaching the reserve team, but departed in December 2009 along with manager Brian Laws.
