= Martin Fowler (footballer) =

Professional footballer

Personal information
- Date of birth: 17 January 1957 (age 69)
- Place of birth: York, England
- Height: 5 ft 11 in (1.80 m)
- Position: Midfielder

Youth career
- Huddersfield Town

Senior career*
Years	Team	Apps	(Gls)
1973–1978	Huddersfield Town	73	(2)
1978–1980	Blackburn Rovers	38	(0)
1979	→ Hartlepool United (loan)	6	(0)
1980–1982	Stockport County	75	(6)
1982–1983	Scunthorpe United	18	(0)
- Rowntree Mackintosh
- * Club domestic league appearances and goals

Martin Fowler (born 17 January 1957 in York) is an English former professional footballer who played in the Football League as a midfielder for Huddersfield Town, Blackburn Rovers, Hartlepool United, Stockport County and Scunthorpe United.
