= Franny Firth =

English footballer (1956–2018)

Personal information
- Full name: Francis Martin Firth
- Date of birth: 27 May 1956
- Place of birth: Dewsbury, England
- Date of death: 21 May 2018 (aged 61)
- Place of death: Wakefield
- Position: Winger

Youth career
- Huddersfield Town

Senior career*
Years	Team	Apps	(Gls)
1973–1977	Huddersfield Town	27	(4)
1977–1982	Halifax Town	168	(19)
1982–1983	Bury	33	(4)
1983–198x	Witton Albion		
- * Club domestic league appearances and goals

Francis Martin "Franny" Firth (27 May 1956 – 21 May 2018) was an English professional footballer who played as a winger for Huddersfield Town, Halifax Town and Bury in the Football League and for Witton Albion in non-league football.
