= John Saunders (footballer, born Worksop) =

English footballer

Personal information
- Full name: John George Saunders
- Date of birth: 1 December 1950
- Place of birth: Worksop, England
- Date of death: 4 January 1998 (aged 47)
- Position: Centre back

Youth career
- Mansfield Town

Senior career*
Years	Team	Apps	(Gls)
1969–1973	Mansfield Town	89	(2)
1972–1976	Huddersfield Town	121	(1)
1975–1979	Barnsley	145	(7)
1979–1980	Lincoln City	26	(1)
1980–1981	Doncaster Rovers	28	(2)
- * Club domestic league appearances and goals

John George Saunders (1 December 1950 – 4 January 1998) was a professional footballer, who played for Mansfield Town, Huddersfield Town, Barnsley, Lincoln City, Doncaster Rovers and Worksop Town.
