= Paul Garner (footballer) =

English footballer

Personal information
- Date of birth: 1 December 1955 (age 70)
- Place of birth: Edlington, England
- Height: 5 ft 8 3/4 in (1.75 m)
- Position: Left back

Youth career
- Huddersfield Town

Senior career*
Years	Team	Apps	(Gls)
1972–1975	Huddersfield Town	96	(2)
1975–1984	Sheffield United	251	(7)
1983	→ Gillingham (loan)	5	(0)
1984–1989	Mansfield Town	111	(8)
Total		463	(17)

International career
1974	England Youth	3	(0)
- * Club domestic league appearances and goals

Paul Garner (born 1 December 1955) is an English former professional footballer who played as a left back in the Football League for Huddersfield Town, Sheffield United, Gillingham and Mansfield Town. At Mansfield he helped them win the 1986–87 Associate Members' Cup, playing in the final.

== Honours ==
Sheffield United

- Football League Fourth Division: 1981–82

Mansfield Town

- Associate Members' Cup: 1986–87
