= Peter Hart (footballer) =

English footballer

Personal information
- Full name: Peter Osborne Hart
- Date of birth: 14 August 1957 (age 69)
- Place of birth: Mexborough, England
- Height: 5 ft 11 in (1.80 m)
- Position: Defender

Youth career
- Huddersfield Town

Senior career*
| Years | Team | Apps | (Gls) |
| 1974–1980 | Huddersfield Town | 210 | (7) |
| 1980–1990 | Walsall | 390 | (12) |
| Total | | 600 | (19) |
- * Club domestic league appearances and goals

Peter Osborne Hart (born 14 August 1957) is an English former footballer who played mainly as a defender. He made 600 appearances in the Football League playing for Huddersfield Town and Walsall.

== Career ==
Hart holds the record for the youngest debutant for Huddersfield Town, having made his debut aged 16 years and 229 days against Southend United in 1974. He played for Huddersfield in the final of the 1974 FA Youth Cup, and captained the club to the Fourth Division title in 1980. He then moved to Walsall, helped them reach the semi-final of the 1983–84 Football League Cup, and captained the side to promotion to the Second Division via the play-offs in 1988. The final game at Walsall's Fellows Park ground was Hart's testimonial match against West Bromwich Albion. After retiring from football he was ordained as a minister of the Church of England and became vicar of St Luke's Church in Cannock. In November 2017 he became vicar of St John the Baptist church in Armitage.

== Honours ==
Huddersfield Town

- Football League Fourth Division: 1979–80

Walsall

- Football League Third Division play-offs: 1988
