= Richard Taylor (footballer, born 1957) =

English footballer

Personal information
- Full name: Richard Herbert Taylor
- Date of birth: 24 January 1957 (age 69)
- Place of birth: Huddersfield, England
- Position: Goalkeeper

Senior career*
Years	Team	Apps	(Gls)
1973–1982	Huddersfield Town	105	(0)
1980	→ York City (loan)	2	(0)

International career
1975	England Youth	1	(0)
- * Club domestic league appearances and goals

Richard Herbert Taylor (born 24 January 1957) is an English former footballer who played for Huddersfield Town and York City.

He was born in Farnley Tyas and played for England Youth in the early 1970s.

He was the goalkeeper on the losing side of the 1974 Youth Cup final. Spurs won 2–1.
