= Terry Gray (footballer) =

English footballer

Personal information
- Full name: Terence Ian Gray
- Date of birth: 3 June 1954 (age 72)
- Place of birth: Bradford, England
- Position: Midfielder

Senior career*
Years	Team	Apps	(Gls)
1972–1979	Huddersfield Town	163	(36)
1979–1982	Southend United	110	(28)
1982–1984	Bradford City	69	(15)
1984–1986	Preston North End	40	(1)
1986	Goole Town		

International career
1972	England Youth	2	(1)
- * Club domestic league appearances and goals

Terence Ian Gray (born 3 June 1954 in Bradford) is an English former professional footballer who played nearly 400 games as a midfielder in the Football League for Huddersfield Town, Southend United, Bradford City and Preston North End.

== Honours ==
Southend United

- Football League Fourth Division: 1980–81
