= 1977–78 Northampton Town F.C. season =

Northampton Town
1977–78 season
- Chairman: Bob Brett
- Manager: John Petts (until January); Dave Bowen (caretaker); Mike Keen (from February)
- Stadium: County Ground
- Division Four: 10th
- FA Cup: Second round
- League Cup: Second round
- Top goalscorer: League: George Reilly (21); All: George Reilly (22)
- Highest home attendance: 8,041 vs Watford
- Lowest home attendance: 2,278 vs Halifax Town
- Average home league attendance: 3,517

The 1977–78 season was Northampton Town's 81st season in their history and the first season back in the Fourth Division following relegation the previous season. In addition to competing in Division Four, the club also participated in the FA Cup and League Cup.

== Players ==
As of the match played on 29 April 1978.

Name	Position	Nat.	Place of Birth	Date of Birth (Age)	Apps	Goals	Previous club	Date signed	Fee
Goalkeepers
Carl Jayes	GK	(England)	Leicester	15 March 1954 (aged 24)	27	0	Leicester City	November 1977	
Jeff Parton	GK	(Wales)	Swansea	24 February 1953 (aged 25)	30	0	Burnley	Summer 1975	
Defenders
Steve Bryant	LB	(England)	London	5 September 1953 (aged 24)	74	2	Birmingham City	December 1976	
Tony Geidmintis	RB	(England)	London	30 July 1949 (aged 28)	18	0	Watford	February 1978	£8,000
Steve Litt (c)	CB	(England)	Carlisle	21 May 1954 (aged 23)	22	0	Minnesota Kicks	September 1977	
Dave Lyon	CB	(England)	Altrincham	18 January 1951 (aged 27)	6	0	Cambridge United	October 1977	
Peter Mead	LB	(England)	Luton	9 September 1956 (aged 21)	39	1	Luton Town	August 1977	
Stuart Robertson	CB	(England)	Nottingham	16 December 1946 (aged 31)	237	23	Doncaster Rovers	Summer 1972	
Midfielders
Billy Best	U	(Scotland)	Glasgow	7 September 1942 (aged 35)	271	56	Southend United	Summer 1973	
Derrick Christie	W	(England)	Bletchley	15 March 1957 (aged 21)	136	17	Apprentice	January 1974	N/A
John Farrington	W	(England)	Lynemouth	19 June 1947 (aged 30)	170	19	Cardiff City	Summer 1974	
David Liddle	CM	(England)	Bedford	21 May 1957 (aged 20)	32	2	Apprentice	July 1977	N/A
Don Martin	U	(England)	Corby	15 February 1944 (aged 34)	252	81	Blackburn Rovers	November 1975	
Andy McGowan	CM	(England)	Corby	17 July 1956 (aged 21)	111	14	Apprentice	June 1975	N/A
Kim Wassell	W	(England)	Wolverhampton	9 June 1957 (aged 20)	7	0	West Bromwich Albion	September 1977	
Keith Williams	CM	(England)	Dudley	12 April 1957 (aged 21)	49	3	Aston Villa	February 1977	
Forwards
Keith Bowen	FW	(Wales)	Northampton	26 February 1958 (aged 20)	1	0	Apprentice	Summer 1976	N/A
Jim Hall	FW	(England)	Northampton	21 March 1945 (aged 33)	136	35	Peterborough United	Summer 1975	
George Reilly	FW	(Scotland)	Bellshill	14 September 1957 (aged 20)	72	24	Corby Town	June 1976	
Paul Stratford	FW	(England)	Northampton	4 September 1955 (aged 22)	188	61	Apprentice	Summer 1972	N/A

== Competitions ==
=== Division Four ===
==== League table ====
Pos	Team	Pld	W	D	L	GF	GA	GD	Pts
8	Reading	46	18	14	14	55	52	+3	50
9	Torquay United	46	16	15	15	57	56	+1	47
10	Northampton Town	46	17	13	16	63	68	−5	47
11	Huddersfield Town	46	15	15	16	63	55	+8	45
12	Doncaster Rovers	46	14	17	15	52	65	−13	45

==== Results summary ====
Overall								Home						Away					
Pld	W	D	L	GF	GA	GAv	Pts	W	D	L	GF	GA	Pts	W	D	L	GF	GA	Pts
46	17	13	16	63	68	0.926	47	9	8	6	32	30	26	8	5	10	31	38	21

Last updated: 2 February 2024.

==== League position by match ====
Round	1	2	3	4	5	6	7	8	9	10	11	12	13	14	15	16	17	18	19	20	21	22	23	24	25	26	27	28	29	30	31	32	33	34	35	36	37	38	39	40	41	42	43	44	45	46
Ground	A	A	A	H	A	H	H	A	H	A	A	H	H	A	H	A	H	A	H	A	H	A	H	H	A	H	A	H	H	H	A	A	H	H	A	H	A	H	A	A	H	A	A	H	H	A
Result	L	D	W	W	L	W	W	L	W	D	L	L	W	L	W	D	L	L	D	W	D	L	W	D	L	D	L	W	L	L	D	W	D	L	D	D	W	L	L	W	D	W	W	W	D	W
Position	23	17	9	5	9	8	7	10	6	8	9	12	8	9	9	9	12	15	14	13	14	16	10	13	15	15	15	15	17	17	18	16	17	17	17	16	14	17	18	16	16	13	11	9	9	10

Source: 11v11.com
A = Away; H = Home; W = Win; D = Draw; L = Loss

==== Matches ====
Win Draw Loss

20 August 1977 1	Brentford	3–0	Northampton Town	Brentford, London
15:00 BST	B.Lloyd; A.McCulloch; S.Phillips			Stadium: Griffin Park; Attendance: 5,492

22 August 1977 2	Southend United	0–0	Northampton Town	Southend-on-Sea
19:30 BST				Stadium: Roots Hall; Attendance: 3,693

27 August 1977 3	Halifax Town	0–1	Northampton Town	Halifax
15:00 BST			S.Bryant	Stadium: The Shay; Attendance: 1,869

3 September 1977 4	Northampton Town	1–0	Torquay United	Northampton
15:00 BST	D.Christie			Stadium: County Ground; Attendance: 3,889

9 September 1977 5	Southport	3–1	Northampton Town	Southport
19:30 BST			S.Robertson	Stadium: Haig Avenue; Attendance: 2,677

13 September 1977 6	Northampton Town	2–1	Stockport County	Northampton
19:30 BST	J.Farrington; G.Reilly			Stadium: County Ground; Attendance: 3,880

17 September 1977 7	Northampton Town	5–3	Hartlepool United	Northampton
15:00 BST	D.Martin; G.Reilly; S.Robertson			Stadium: County Ground; Attendance: 3,499

24 September 1977 8	Wimbledon	2–0	Northampton Town	Wimbledon, London
15:00 BST	B.Holmes 35'; P.Summerill 38'			Stadium: Plough Lane; Attendance: 3,236

27 September 1977 9	Northampton Town	3–1	Huddersfield Town	Northampton
19:30 BST	B.Best; G.Reilly		T.Gray	Stadium: County Ground; Attendance: 3,942

1 October 1977 10	Scunthorpe United	2–2	Northampton Town	Scunthorpe
15:15 BST			D.Martin	Stadium: Old Show Ground; Attendance: 2,711

4 October 1977 11	Darlington	2–0	Northampton Town	Darlington
19:30 BST				Stadium: Feethams; Attendance: 1,729

8 October 1977 12	Northampton Town	0–2	Reading	Northampton
15:00 BST				Stadium: County Ground; Attendance: 3,861

11 October 1977 13	Northampton Town	3–1	Rochdale	Northampton
19:30 BST	D.Christie; G.Reilly		S.Melledew	Stadium: County Ground; Attendance: 2,965

14 October 1977 14	Crewe Alexandra	3–2	Northampton Town	Crewe
19:30 BST			B.Best; D.Christie	Stadium: Gresty Road; Attendance: 2,807

22 October 1977 15	Northampton Town	1–0	AFC Bournemouth	Northampton
15:00 BST	G.Reilly			Stadium: County Ground; Attendance: 3,479

29 October 1977 16	Rochdale	1–1	Northampton Town	Rochdale
15:00 GMT	O'Loughlin 72' (pen.)		J.Farrington 90'	Stadium: Spotland; Attendance: 1,198

5 November 1977 17	Northampton Town	2–4	Newport County	Northampton
15:00 GMT	D.Christie; D.Martin		H.Goddard; J.Emanuel; R.Walker	Stadium: County Ground; Attendance: 3,568

12 November 1977 18	Doncaster Rovers	4–2	Northampton Town	Doncaster
14:00 GMT			J.Hall; A.McGowan	Stadium: Belle Vue; Attendance: 2,688

19 November 1977 19	Northampton Town	1–1	Barnsley	Northampton
15:00 GMT	G.Reilly			Stadium: County Ground; Attendance: 3,131

3 December 1977 20	Swansea City	2–4	Northampton Town	Swansea, Wales
15:00 GMT			D.Christie; J.Farrington; D.Liddle; G.Reilly	Stadium: Vetch Field; Attendance: 4,735

10 December 1977 21	Northampton Town	1–1	York City	Northampton
15:00 GMT	D.Martin			Stadium: County Ground; Attendance: 3,108

26 December 1977 22	Watford	3–0	Northampton Town	Watford
15:00 GMT	B.Downes; A.Mayes; B.Pollard			Stadium: Vicarage Road; Attendance: 15,056

27 December 1977 23	Northampton Town	2–1	Grimsby Town	Northampton
15:00 GMT	D.Martin; B.Tucker			Stadium: County Ground; Attendance: 3,518

31 December 1977 24	Northampton Town	1–1	Aldershot	Northampton
15:00 GMT	J.Farrington			Stadium: County Ground; Attendance: 3,598

2 January 1978 25	Newport County	5–3	Northampton Town	Newport, Wales
15:15 GMT	H.Goddard; B.Clark; Jones		J.Farrington; G.Reilly	Stadium: Rodney Parade; Attendance: 7,160

14 January 1978 26	Northampton Town	2–2	Brentford	Northampton
15:00 GMT	G.Reilly		A.McCulloch	Stadium: County Ground; Attendance: 4,050

28 January 1978 27	Torquay United	2–1	Northampton Town	Torquay
15:00 GMT			G.Reilly	Stadium: Plainmoor; Attendance: 2,443

4 February 1978 28	Northampton Town	1–0	Southport	Northampton
15:00 GMT	Mead			Stadium: County Ground; Attendance: 2,374

25 February 1978 29	Northampton Town	1–2	Scunthorpe United	Northampton
15:00 GMT	D.Christie			Stadium: County Ground; Attendance: 2,952

28 February 1978 30	Northampton Town	0–3	Wimbledon	Northampton
19:30 GMT			R.Connell 23', 44'; S.Parsons 30'	Stadium: County Ground; Attendance: 2,643

4 March 1978 31	Reading	0–0	Northampton Town	Reading
15:00 GMT				Stadium: Elm Park; Attendance: 2,443

6 March 1978 32	Stockport County	1–2	Northampton Town	Stockport
19:30 GMT			D.Liddle; G.Reilly	Stadium: Edgeley Park; Attendance: 3,358

11 March 1978 33	Northampton Town	0–0	Crewe Alexandra	Northampton
15:00 GMT				Stadium: County Ground; Attendance: 2,842

14 March 1978 34	Northampton Town	1–2	Halifax Town	Northampton
19:30 GMT	J.Farrington			Stadium: County Ground; Attendance: 2,278
Note: Fixture was previously postponed on January 21, 1978.

17 March 1978 35	AFC Bournemouth	1–1	Northampton Town	Bournemouth
19:30 GMT			A.McGowan	Stadium: Dean Court; Attendance: 2,221

21 March 1978 36	Northampton Town	0–0	Southend United	Northampton
19:30 GMT				Stadium: County Ground; Attendance: 2,431

25 March 1978 37	Grimsby Town	0–1	Northampton Town	Cleethorpes
15:00 GMT			A.McGowan	Stadium: Blundell Park; Attendance: 5,077

28 March 1978 38	Northampton Town	0–2	Watford	Northampton
19:30 GMT			I.Bolton; A.Mayes	Stadium: County Ground; Attendance: 8,041

1 April 1978 39	Aldershot	2–1	Northampton Town	Aldershot
15:00 GMT			D.Martin	Stadium: Recreation Ground; Attendance: 3,353

4 April 1978 40	Huddersfield Town	0–1	Northampton Town	Huddersfield
19:30 GMT			S.Bryant	Stadium: Leeds Road; Attendance: 3,488

8 April 1978 41	Northampton Town	0–0	Doncaster Rovers	Northampton
15:00 GMT				Stadium: County Ground; Attendance: 2,793

11 April 1978 42	Hartlepool United	0–2	Northampton Town	Hartlepool
19:15 GMT			A.McGowan	Stadium: Victoria Park; Attendance: 2,844
Note: Fixture was previously postponed on February 9, 1985.

15 April 1978 43	Barnsley	2–3	Northampton Town	Barnsley
15:00 GMT			J.Farrington; D.Christie; G.Reilly	Stadium: Oakwell; Attendance: 3,434

22 April 1978 44	Northampton Town	3–1	Swansea City	Northampton
15:00 GMT	D.Christie; G.Reilly; S.Robertson			Stadium: County Ground; Attendance: 4,865

25 April 1978 45	Northampton Town	2–2	Darlington	Northampton
19:30 GMT	A.McGowan; G.Reilly			Stadium: County Ground; Attendance: 3,181

29 April 1978 46	York City	0–3	Northampton Town	York
15:00 GMT			G.Reilly; K.Williams	Stadium: Bootham Crescent; Attendance: 1,389

=== FA Cup ===
26 November 1977 First round	Tooting & Mitcham United	1–2	Northampton Town	Mitcham, London
15:00 GMT			D.Christie; D.Martin	Stadium: Sandy Lane; Attendance: 3,513

17 December 1977 Second round	Northampton Town	0–2	Enfield	Northampton
15:00 GMT				Stadium: County Ground; Attendance: 5,249

=== League Cup ===
13 August 1976 First round 1st leg	Southend United	2–3	Northampton Town	Southend-on-Sea
19:30 BST			J.Farrington; G.Reilly; K.Williams	Stadium: Roots Hall; Attendance: 4,654

16 August 1976 First round 2nd leg	Northampton Town	2–1	Southend United	Northampton
19:30 BST	B.Best; D.Martin			Stadium: County Ground; Attendance: 4,395

30 August 1977 Second round	Ipswich Town	5–0	Northampton Town	Ipswich
19:30 BST				Stadium: Portman Road; Attendance: 15,443

=== Appearances and goals ===
Pos	Player	Division Four			FA Cup			League Cup			Total		
Pos	Player	Starts	Sub	Goals	Starts	Sub	Goals	Starts	Sub	Goals	Starts	Sub	Goals
GK	Carl Jayes	25	–	–	2	–	–	–	–	–	27	–	–
GK	Jeff Parton	10	–	–	–	–	–	2	–	–	12	–	–
DF	Steve Bryant	39	2	2	2	–	–	3	–	–	44	2	2
DF	Tony Geidmintis	18	–	–	–	–	–	–	–	–	18	–	–
DF	Steve Litt	19	1	–	2	–	–	–	–	–	21	1	–
DF	Dave Lyon	6	–	–	–	–	–	–	–	–	6	–	–
DF	Peter Mead	37	1	1	–	–	–	–	1	–	37	2	1
DF	Stuart Robertson	38	–	3	2	–	–	3	–	–	43	–	3
MF	Billy Best	33	1	2	1	–	–	3	–	–	37	1	2
MF	Derrick Christie	39	4	9	2	–	1	1	1	–	42	5	10
MF	John Farrington	44	–	7	2	–	–	3	–	1	49	–	8
MF	David Liddle	25	2	2	2	–	–	3	–	–	30	2	2
MF	Andy McGowan	30	2	6	–	–	–	2	–	–	32	2	6
MF	Don Martin	16	9	7	2	–	1	2	–	1	20	9	9
MF	Kim Wassell	3	4	–	–	–	–	–	–	–	3	4	–
MF	Keith Williams	25	3	1	–	1	–	3	–	1	28	4	2
FW	Keith Bowen	–	–	–	–	–	–	–	–	–	–	–	–
FW	Jim Hall	10	–	1	1	–	–	–	–	–	11	–	1
FW	George Reilly	44	–	21	2	–	–	3	–	1	49	–	22
FW	Paul Stratford	2	–	–	–	–	–	–	–	–	2	–	–
Non-professional:
DF	Arthur Poppy	1	–	–	–	–	–	–	–	–	1	–	–
Players who left before end of season:
GK	Stuart Garnham	11	–	–	–	–	–	1	–	–	12	–	–
DF	Barry Tucker	28	–	1	2	–	–	3	–	–	33	–	1
FW	Ray Haywood	3	–	–	–	–	–	1	–	–	4	–	–
