= 1976–77 Northampton Town F.C. season =

Northampton Town F.C.
1976–77 season
- Chairman: Neville Ronson
- Manager: Paddy Crerand
- Stadium: County Ground
- Division Three: 22nd
- FA Cup: First round
- League Cup: First round
- Top goalscorer: League: Paul Stratford (12); All: Paul Stratford (13)
- Highest home attendance: 7,782 vs Brighton & Hove Albion
- Lowest home attendance: 3,911 vs Chesterfield
- Average home league attendance: 5,750

The 1976–77 season was Northampton Town's 80th season in their history and the first season back in the Third Division following promotion the previous season. Alongside competing in Division Three, the club also participated in the FA Cup and League Cup.

== Players ==
As of match played 7 May 1977.

Name	Position	Nat.	Place of birth	Date of birth (age)	Apps	Goals	Previous club	Date signed	Fee
Goalkeepers
Jeff Parton	GK	(Wales)	Swansea	24 February 1953 (aged 24)	18	0	Burnley	Summer 1975	
Defenders
Steve Bryant	LB	(England)	London	5 September 1953 (aged 23)	28	0	Birmingham City	December 1976	
John Gregory	U	(England)	Scunthorpe	11 May 1954 (aged 22)	203	10	Apprentice	Summer 1972	N/A
Alex Malcolm	LB	(Scotland)	Hamilton	13 February 1956 (aged 21)	2	0	Luton Town	August 1976	
Stuart Robertson	CB	(England)	Nottingham	16 December 1946 (aged 30)	194	20	Doncaster Rovers	Summer 1972	
Barry Tucker	FB	(Wales)	Swansea	28 August 1952 (aged 24)	202	2	Apprentice	August 1970	N/A
Midfielders
Billy Best (c)	U	(Scotland)	Glasgow	7 September 1942 (aged 34)	233	53	Southend United	Summer 1973	
Derrick Christie	W	(England)	Bletchley	15 March 1957 (aged 20)	89	7	Apprentice	January 1974	N/A
John Farrington	W	(England)	Lynemouth	19 June 1947 (aged 29)	121	11	Cardiff City	Summer 1974	
Don Martin	U	(England)	Corby	15 February 1944 (aged 33)	223	72	Blackburn Rovers	November 1975	
Andy McGowan	CM	(England)	Corby	17 July 1956 (aged 20)	77	8	Apprentice	June 1975	N/A
Keith Williams	CM	(England)	Dudley	12 April 1957 (aged 20)	17	1	Aston Villa	February 1977	
Forwards
Keith Bowen	FW	(Wales)	Northampton	26 February 1958 (aged 19)	1	0	Apprentice	Summer 1976	N/A
Jim Hall	FW	(England)	Northampton	21 March 1945 (aged 32)	125	34	Peterborough United	Summer 1975	
Ray Haywood	FW	(England)	Dudley	12 January 1949 (aged 28)	13	2	Shrewsbury Town	March 1977	
George Reilly	FW	(Scotland)	Bellshill	14 September 1957 (aged 19)	23	2	Corby Town	June 1976	
Paul Stratford	FW	(England)	Northampton	4 September 1955 (aged 21)	186	61	Apprentice	Summer 1972	N/A

== Competitions ==
=== Division Three ===
==== League table ====
Pos	Team	Pld	W	D	L	GF	GA	GD	Pts	Promotion or relegation
20	Portsmouth	46	11	14	21	53	70	−17	36	
21	Reading (R)	46	13	9	24	49	73	−24	35	Relegation to the Fourth Division
22	Northampton Town (R)	46	13	8	25	60	75	−15	34	Relegation to the Fourth Division
23	Grimsby Town (R)	46	12	9	25	45	69	−24	33	Relegation to the Fourth Division
24	York City (R)	46	10	12	24	50	89	−39	32	Relegation to the Fourth Division

Source: rsssf.com
(R) Relegated

==== Results summary ====
Overall								Home						Away					
Pld	W	D	L	GF	GA	GAv	Pts	W	D	L	GF	GA	Pts	W	D	L	GF	GA	Pts
46	13	8	25	60	75	0.8	34	9	4	10	33	29	22	4	4	15	27	46	12

Last updated: 9 April 2020.

==== League position by match ====
Round	1	2	3	4	5	6	7	8	9	10	11	12	13	14	15	16	17	18	19	20	21	22	23	24	25	26	27	28	29	30	31	32	33	34	35	36	37	38	39	40	41	42	43	44	45	46
Ground	A	A	H	A	H	A	H	H	A	H	A	A	H	H	A	H	A	A	H	H	A	H	H	H	A	A	H	A	A	H	A	H	A	H	H	A	H	H	A	A	H	H	A	H	A	A
Result	D	L	W	D	L	L	L	L	L	W	L	W	L	D	L	W	L	D	L	L	L	L	L	W	W	L	L	D	W	W	W	L	L	W	W	L	D	W	L	L	W	D	L	D	L	L
Position	14	16	8	9	14	19	22	23	24	20	22	20	21	22	23	22	23	23	23	23	23	23	23	23	23	24	24	24	24	21	22	22	22	20	17	20	20	20	21	21	20	19	19	19	20	22

Source: 11v11.com
A = Away; H = Home; W = Win; D = Draw; L = Loss

==== Matches ====
Win Draw Loss

21 August 1976 1	Chesterfield	0–0	Northampton Town	Chesterfield
15:00 BST				Stadium: Saltergate; Attendance: 4,052

25 August 1976 2	Sheffield Wednesday	2–1	Northampton Town	Sheffield
19:30 BST			D.Christie	Stadium: Hillsborough Stadium; Attendance: 11,684; Referee: G P Owen

28 August 1976 3	Northampton Town	1–0	Lincoln City	Northampton
15:00 BST	D.Christie			Stadium: County Ground; Attendance: 6,350

4 September 1976 4	Gillingham	1–1	Northampton Town	Gillingham
15:00 BST			J.Hall	Stadium: Priestfield Stadium; Attendance: 5,375

11 September 1976 5	Northampton Town	1–2	Reading	Northampton
15:00 BST	S.Robertson			Stadium: County Ground; Attendance: 6,176

18 September 1976 6	Shrewsbury Town	3–0	Northampton Town	Shrewsbury
15:00 BST				Stadium: Gay Meadow; Attendance: 4,191

25 September 1976 7	Northampton Town	0–1	Walsall	Northampton
15:00 BST				Stadium: County Ground; Attendance: 5,656; Referee: Colin Gardner

1 October 1976 8	Northampton Town	0–2	Wrexham	Northampton
19:30 BST				Stadium: County Ground; Attendance: 5,114; Referee: Jim Bent

8 October 1976 9	Port Vale	2–1	Northampton Town	Burslem
15:00 BST	D.Brownbill; J.Rogers		S.Phillips	Stadium: Vale Park; Attendance: 3,962

15 October 1976 10	Northampton Town	3–1	Portsmouth	Northampton
19:30 BST	J.Hall; S.Robertson; G.Reilly			Stadium: County Ground; Attendance: 4,805

23 October 1976 11	Swindon Town	5–1	Northampton Town	Swindon
15:00 BST	T.Anderson 21' (pen.), 87' (pen.); D.Moss 43'; J.McLaughlin 79'; D.Syrett 89'	Report	A.McGowan 70'	Stadium: County Ground; Attendance: 7,483; Referee: Clive Thomas

26 October 1976 12	York City	1–4	Northampton Town	York
19:30 GMT			D.Christie; J.Farrington; P.Stratford	Stadium: Bootham Crescent; Attendance: 2,634

30 October 1976 13	Northampton Town	0–2	Brighton & Hove Albion	Northampton
15:00 GMT				Stadium: County Ground; Attendance: 7,782; Referee: Ken Salmon

2 November 1976 14	Northampton Town	2–2	Peterborough United	Northampton
19:30 GMT	P.Stratford o.g.'			Stadium: County Ground; Attendance: 7,483

6 November 1976 15	Preston North End	3–0	Northampton Town	Preston
15:00 GMT			[	Stadium: Deepdale; Attendance: 7,306

13 November 1976 16	Northampton Town	1–0	Oxford United	Northampton
15:00 GMT	S.Robertson			Stadium: County Ground; Attendance: 7,021

27 November 1976 17	Chester City	2–1	Northampton Town	Chester
15:00 GMT	A.Oakes; I.Edwards		S.Phillips	Stadium: Sealand Road; Attendance: 3,721

18 December 1976 18	Crystal Palace	1–1	Northampton Town	Selhurst, London
15:00 GMT			A.McGowan	Stadium: Selhurst Park; Attendance: 11,032

27 December 1976 19	Northampton Town	1–4	Rotherham United	Northampton
15:00 GMT	J.Gregory			Stadium: County Ground; Attendance: 6,963

1 January 1977 20	Northampton Town	0–1	Preston North End	Northampton
15:00 GMT				Stadium: County Ground; Attendance: 5,024

3 January 1977 21	Brighton and Hove Albion	2–0	Northampton Town	Hove
15:00 GMT				Stadium: Goldstone Ground; Attendance: 22,517

7 January 1977 22	Northampton Town	3–4	Tranmere Rovers	Northampton
19:30 GMT	B.Best; D.Martin; P.Stratford			Stadium: County Ground; Attendance: 4,267

15 January 1977 23	Northampton Town	0–2	Sheffield Wednesday	Northampton
15:00 GMT				Stadium: County Ground; Attendance: 5,828

22 January 1977 24	Northampton Town	2–1	Chesterfield	Northampton
15:00 GMT	B.Best; J.Gilligan			Stadium: County Ground; Attendance: 3,911

29 January 1977 25	Grimsby Town	0–1	Northampton Town	Cleethorpes
15:00 GMT			J.Farrington	Stadium: Blundell Park; Attendance: 3,909

5 February 1977 26	Lincoln City	5–4	Northampton Town	Lincoln
15:00 GMT			B.Best; S.Robertson	Stadium: Sincil Bank; Attendance: 5,869

12 February 1977 27	Northampton Town	1–2	Gillingham	Northampton
15:00 GMT	J.Farrington			Stadium: County Ground; Attendance: 4,391

15 February 1977 28	Bury	1–1	Northampton Town	Bury
19:30 GMT			J.Farrington	Stadium: Gigg Lane; Attendance: 3,809

19 February 1977 29	Reading	2–4	Northampton Town	Reading
15:00 GMT			D.Christie; A.McGowan; P.Stratford	Stadium: Elm Park; Attendance: 5,051

26 February 1977 30	Northampton Town	5–3	Shrewsbury Town	Northampton
15:00 GMT	B.Best; J.Gregory; D.Martin; P.Stratford			Stadium: County Ground; Attendance: 5,112

5 March 1977 31	Walsall	0–3	Northampton Town	Walsall
15:00 GMT			D.Martin; P.Stratford	Stadium: Fellows Park; Attendance: 4,806

8 March 1977 32	Northampton Town	0–1	Mansfield Town	Northampton
19:30 GMT				Stadium: County Ground; Attendance: 7,283

12 March 1977 33	Wrexham	3–1	Northampton Town	Wrexham, Wales
15:00 GMT			B.Best	Stadium: Racecourse Ground; Attendance: 6,775

15 March 1977 34	Northampton Town	3–0	Crystal Palace	Northampton
19:30 GMT	J.Gregory; R.Haywood; P.Stratford			Stadium: County Ground; Attendance: 6,253

19 March 1977 35	Northampton Town	3–0	Port Vale	Northampton
15:00 GMT	B.Best; P.Stratford			Stadium: County Ground; Attendance: 5,808

26 March 1977 36	Portsmouth	2–1	Northampton Town	Portsmouth
15:00 BST			P.Stratford	Stadium: Fratton Park; Attendance: 9,195

1 April 1977 37	Northampton Town	1–1	Swindon Town	Northampton
19:30 BST	B.Best 77'	Report	C.Prophett 83'	Stadium: County Ground; Attendance: 5,609

9 April 1977 38	Northampton Town	3–0	Bury	Northampton
15:00 BST	B.Best; P.Stratford o.g.'			Stadium: County Ground; Attendance: 5,262

11 April 1977 39	Rotherham United	2–0	Northampton Town	Rotherham
15:00 BST				Stadium: Millmoor; Attendance: 7,286

12 April 1977 40	Peterborough United	3–1	Northampton Town	Peterborough
19:30 BST			J.Gregory	Stadium: London Road; Attendance: 7,286

16 April 1977 41	Northampton Town	3–0	York City	Northampton
15:00 BST	B.Best; G.Reilly; K.Williams			Stadium: County Ground; Attendance: 5,427

19 April 1977 42	Northampton Town	0–0	Grimsby Town	Northampton
19:30 BST				Stadium: County Ground; Attendance: 5,699

23 April 1977 43	Oxford United	1–0	Northampton Town	Oxford
15:00 BST				Stadium: Manor Ground; Attendance: 5,075

29 April 1977 44	Northampton Town	0–0	Chester City	Northampton
19:30 BST				Stadium: County Ground; Attendance: 5,015

2 May 1977 45	Tranmere Rovers	2–1	Northampton Town	Birkenhead
15:00 BST			R.Haywood	Stadium: Prenton Park; Attendance: 2,030

7 May 1977 46	Mansfield Town	3–0	Northampton Town	Mansfield
15:00 BST				Stadium: Field Mill; Attendance: 11,314

=== FA Cup ===
20 November 1976 First round	Leatherhead	2–0	Northampton Town	Leatherhead
15:00 GMT				Stadium: Fetcham Grove; Attendance: 3,550

=== League Cup ===
14 August 1976 First round 1st leg	Swindon Town	3–2	Northampton Town	Swindon
19:30 BST	K.Stroud 24'; H.Goddard 75'; D.Syrett 85'	Report	D.Christie; J.Gregory	Stadium: County Ground; Attendance: 6,353

18 August 1976 First round 2nd leg	Northampton Town	2–0	Swindon Town	Northampton
19:30 BST	D.Martin; P.Stratford	Report		Stadium: County Ground; Attendance: 7,037

31 August 1976 Second round	Northampton Town	0–1	Huddersfield Town	Northampton
19:30 BST				Stadium: County Ground; Attendance: 6,641

=== Appearances and goals ===
Pos	Player	Division Three			FA Cup			League Cup			Total		
Pos	Player	Starts	Sub	Goals	Starts	Sub	Goals	Starts	Sub	Goals	Starts	Sub	Goals
GK	Jeff Parton	12	–	–	1	–	–	–	–	–	13	–	–
DF	Steve Bryant	28	–	–	–	–	–	–	–	–	28	–	–
DF	John Gregory	46	–	4	1	–	–	3	–	1	50	–	5
DF	Alex Malcolm	2	–	–	–	–	–	–	–	–	2	–	–
DF	Stuart Robertson	41	–	4	1	–	–	3	–	–	45	–	4
DF	Barry Tucker	37	–	–	1	–	–	3	–	–	41	–	–
MF	Billy Best	40	–	11	1	–	–	3	–	–	44	–	11
MF	Derrick Christie	37	7	5	1	–	–	3	–	1	41	7	6
MF	John Farrington	35	6	4	–	1	–	–	2	–	35	9	4
MF	Andy McGowan	25	6	4	–	–	–	3	–	–	28	6	4
MF	Don Martin	32	5	3	1	–	–	3	–	1	36	5	4
MF	Keith Williams	17	–	1	–	–	–	–	–	–	17	–	1
FW	Keith Bowen	–	1	–	–	–	–	–	–	–	–	1	–
FW	Ray Haywood	11	2	2	–	–	–	–	–	–	11	2	2
FW	George Reilly	19	3	2	1	–	–	–	–	–	20	3	2
FW	Paul Stratford	40	2	12	1	–	–	3	–	1	44	2	13
Players who left before end of season:
GK	Alan Starling	26	–	–	–	–	–	3	–	–	29	–	–
GK	Bob Ward	8	–	–	–	–	–	–	–	–	8	–	–
DF	Dave Carlton	6	–	–	–	–	–	–	–	–	6	–	–
DF	Ian Ross	2	–	–	–	–	–	–	–	–	2	–	–
MF	John Gilligan	5	–	1	–	–	–	–	–	–	5	–	1
FW	Keith Bowker	4	–	–	–	–	–	–	–	–	4	–	–
FW	Jim Hall	11	–	2	1	–	–	3	–	–	15	–	2
FW	Bobby Owen	5	–	–	–	–	–	–	–	–	5	–	–
FW	Steve Phillips	16	1	2	1	–	–	3	–	–	20	1	2
