= 1975–76 Northampton Town F.C. season =

Northampton Town
1975–76 season
- Chairman: Neville Ronson
- Manager: Bill Dodgin Jr.
- Stadium: County Ground
- Division Four: 2nd
- FA Cup: First round
- League Cup: First round
- Top goalscorer: League: Jim Hall (21); All: Jim Hall (22)
- Highest home attendance: 9,548 vs Reading
- Lowest home attendance: 3,675 vs Bradford City
- Average home league attendance: 6,416

The 1975–76 season was Northampton Town's 79th season in their history and the seventh successive season in the Fourth Division. Alongside competing in Division Four, the club also participated in the FA Cup and League Cup.

== Players ==
As of match played 23 April 1976.

Name	Position	Nat.	Place of birth	Date of birth (age)	Apps	Goals	Previous club	Date signed	Fee
Goalkeepers
Jeff Parton	GK	(Wales)	Swansea	24 February 1953 (aged 23)	5	0	Burnley	Summer 1975	
Alan Starling	GK	(England)	Dagenham	2 April 1951 (aged 25)	229	1	Luton Town	June 1971	
Defenders
Dave Carlton	U	(England)	Stepney	24 November 1952 (aged 23)	105	6	Fulham	October 1973	
John Gregory	U	(England)	Scunthorpe	11 May 1954 (aged 21)	153	5	Apprentice	Summer 1972	N/A
Stuart Robertson	CB	(England)	Nottingham	16 December 1946 (aged 29)	149	16	Doncaster Rovers	Summer 1972	
Barry Tucker	FB	(Wales)	Swansea	28 August 1952 (aged 23)	161	2	Apprentice	August 1970	N/A
Midfielders
Billy Best (c)	U	(Scotland)	Glasgow	7 September 1942 (aged 33)	189	41	Southend United	Summer 1973	
Derrick Christie	W	(England)	Bletchley	15 March 1957 (aged 19)	41	1	Apprentice	January 1974	N/A
John Farrington	W	(England)	Lynemouth	19 June 1947 (aged 28)	77	7	Cardiff City	Summer 1974	
Graham Felton	W	(England)	Cambridge	1 March 1949 (aged 27)	286	27	Apprentice	September 1966	N/A
Don Martin	U	(England)	Corby	15 February 1944 (aged 32)	181	68	Blackburn Rovers	November 1975	
Andy McGowan	CM	(England)	Corby	17 July 1956 (aged 19)	43	4	Apprentice	June 1975	N/A
Forwards
Jim Hall	FW	(England)	Northampton	21 March 1945 (aged 31)	110	32	Peterborough United	January 1975	
Steve Phillips	FW	(England)	Edmonton	4 August 1954 (aged 21)	34	7	Birmingham City	October 1975	£5,000
Paul Stratford	FW	(England)	Northampton	4 September 1955 (aged 20)	140	48	Apprentice	Summer 1972	N/A

== Competitions ==
=== Division Four ===
==== League table ====
Pos	Team	Pld	W	D	L	GF	GA	GAv	Pts	Promotion
1	Lincoln City (C, P)	46	32	10	4	111	39	2.846	74	Promotion to the Third Division
2	Northampton Town (P)	46	29	10	7	87	40	2.175	68	Promotion to the Third Division
3	Reading (P)	46	24	12	10	70	51	1.373	60	Promotion to the Third Division
4	Tranmere Rovers (P)	46	24	10	12	89	55	1.618	58	Promotion to the Third Division
5	Huddersfield Town	46	21	14	11	56	41	1.366	56	

(C) Champions; (P) Promoted

==== Results summary ====
Overall								Home						Away					
Pld	W	D	L	GF	GA	GAv	Pts	W	D	L	GF	GA	Pts	W	D	L	GF	GA	Pts
46	29	10	7	87	40	2.175	68	18	5	0	62	20	41	11	5	7	25	20	27

Last updated: 9 April 2020.

==== League position by match ====
Round	1	2	3	4	5	6	7	8	9	10	11	12	13	14	15	16	17	18	19	20	21	22	23	24	25	26	27	28	29	30	31	32	33	34	35	36	37	38	39	40	41	42	43	44	45	46
Ground	A	A	A	H	A	H	H	A	H	A	H	H	A	H	A	A	H	A	H	A	H	A	H	A	H	A	H	A	H	H	A	A	H	A	A	H	A	H	A	H	H	A	H	H	A	H
Result	D	W	L	W	W	D	W	W	W	L	W	W	W	W	W	W	W	D	W	D	W	L	W	L	W	D	W	L	W	W	W	L	W	W	W	D	L	W	W	D	D	W	W	W	D	W
Position	13	5	15	8	3	4	3	3	3	5	3	3	3	2	1	1	1	2	2	1	1	2	2	2	2	2	1	2	2	1	1	2	1	1	1	1	1	1	2	2	2	2	2	2	2	2

Source: 11v11.com
A = Away; H = Home; W = Win; D = Draw; L = Loss

==== Matches ====
Win Draw Loss

16 August 1975 1	Huddersfield Town	1–1	Northampton Town	Huddersfield
15:00 BST	T.Gray		B.Tucker	Stadium: Leeds Road; Attendance: 3,595

22 August 1975 2	Stockport County	1–3	Northampton Town	Stockport
19:30 BST	I.Lawther		J.Hall; J.Farrington	Stadium: Edgeley Park; Attendance: 3,032

30 August 1975 3	Barnsley	3–1	Northampton Town	Barnsley
15:15 BST	M.Butler; J.Peachey		J.Hall	Stadium: Oakwell; Attendance: 3,525; Referee: Don Shaw

5 September 1975 4	Northampton Town	4–2	Bradford City	Northampton
19:30 BST	D.Christie; J.Gregory; S.Robertson; A.McGowan		J.Cooke; G.Ingram	Stadium: County Ground; Attendance: 3,675; Referee: Colin Gardner

13 September 1975 5	Darlington	0–1	Northampton Town	Darlington
15:00 BST			J.Gregory	Stadium: Feethams; Attendance: 3,788

19 September 1975 6	Northampton Town	0–0	Swansea City	Northampton
19:30 BST				Stadium: County Ground; Attendance: 5,428

23 September 1975 7	Northampton Town	2–1	Workington	Northampton
19:30 BST	P.Stratford; B.Best		Murray	Stadium: County Ground; Attendance: 4,677

27 September 1975 8	Torquay United	0–1	Northampton Town	Torquay
15:00 BST			B.Best	Stadium: Plainmoor; Attendance: 1,919

3 October 1975 9	Northampton Town	2–1	Doncaster Rovers	Northampton
19:30 BST	J.Hall; P.Stratford		L.Chappell	Stadium: County Ground; Attendance: 6,155

10 October 1975 10	Tranmere Rovers	2–0	Northampton Town	Birkenhead
19:30 BST	J.James; R.Moore		N.Davids (red card)	Stadium: Prenton Park; Attendance: 4,808

18 October 1975 11	Northampton Town	1–0	Lincoln City	Northampton
15:00 BST	P.Stratford			Stadium: County Ground; Attendance: 6,566

21 October 1975 12	Northampton Town	3–1	Brentford	Northampton
19:30 BST	J.Farrington; B.Best		T.Scales	Stadium: County Ground; Attendance: 6,225

25 October 1975 13	Scunthorpe United	0–2	Northampton Town	Scunthorpe
15:00 BST			P.Stratford	Stadium: Old Showground; Attendance: 1,965

1 November 1975 14	Northampton Town	3–0	Watford	Northampton
15:00 GMT	J.Hall; G.Felton; S.Phillips			Stadium: County Ground; Attendance: 6,656

3 November 1975 15	Rochdale	0–2	Northampton Town	Rochdale
19:30 GMT			S.Robertson; P.Stratford	Stadium: Spotland Stadium; Attendance: 2,995

8 November 1975 16	Cambridge United	0–1	Northampton Town	Cambridge
15:00 GMT			J.Hall; P.Stratford (red card)	Stadium: Abbey Stadium; Attendance: 5,560

15 November 1975 17	Northampton Town	1–0	Southport	Northampton
15:00 GMT	J.Farrington			Stadium: County Ground; Attendance: 6,089; Referee: Eddie Hughes

29 November 1975 18	Bournemouth	0–0	Northampton Town	Bournemouth
15:00 GMT				Stadium: Dean Court; Attendance: 5,890

6 December 1975 19	Northampton Town	2–1	Crewe Alexandra	Northampton
15:00 GMT	J.Hall; A.McGowan		Bowles	Stadium: County Ground; Attendance: 5,705

13 December 1975 20	Exeter City	0–0	Northampton Town	Exeter
15:00 GMT				Stadium: St James Park; Attendance: 3,394

20 December 1975 21	Northampton Town	3–1	Exeter City	Northampton
15:00 GMT	J.Hall; S.Phillips		A.Beer	Stadium: County Ground; Attendance: 5,212

26 December 1975 22	Hartlepool United	3–0	Northampton Town	Hartlepool
15:00 GMT	K.McMahon; D.Smith			Stadium: Victoria Park; Attendance: 5,070

27 December 1975 23	Northampton Town	3–0	Newport County	Northampton
15:00 GMT	S.Phillips; S.Robertson; J.Hall			Stadium: County Ground; Attendance: 8,448

3 January 1976 24	Reading	1–0	Northampton Town	Reading
15:00 GMT	G.Barker			Stadium: Elm Park; Attendance: 10,139

10 January 1976 25	Northampton Town	5–0	Barnsley	Northampton
15:00 GMT	D.Carlton; S.Robertson; J.Hall; B.Best			Stadium: County Ground; Attendance: 6,132

16 January 1976 26	Swansea City	1–1	Northampton Town	Swansea, Wales
19:30 GMT	G.Bray		A.Mayes	Stadium: Vetch Field; Attendance: 3,656

24 January 1976 27	Northampton Town	3–2	Darlington	Northampton
15:00 GMT	S.Robertson; J.Hall		S.Holbrook; S.Webb	Stadium: County Ground; Attendance: 5,135

31 January 1976 28	Brentford	2–1	Northampton Town	Brentford
15:00 GMT	T.Johnson pen.' R.Cross		J.Hall	Stadium: Griffin Park; Attendance: 4,110

7 February 1976 29	Northampton Town	1–1	Rochdale	Northampton
15:00 GMT	P.Stratford		T.Whelan	Stadium: County Ground; Attendance: 5,393

14 February 1976 30	Northampton Town	4–2	Cambridge United	Northampton
15:00 GMT	P.Smith o.g.' A.Mayes; S.Robertson		D.Simmons; S.Spriggs	Stadium: County Ground; Attendance: 5,969

21 February 1976 31	Southport	0–1	Northampton Town	Southport
15:00 GMT			J.Farrington	Stadium: Haig Avenue; Attendance: 1,332

25 February 1976 32	Workington	1–0	Northampton Town	Workington
19:15 GMT	Murray			Stadium: Borough Park; Attendance: 1,135

27 February 1976 33	Northampton Town	2–1	Scunthorpe United	Northampton
19:30 GMT	A.Mayes; D.Martin pen.'		D.O'Connor	Stadium: County Ground; Attendance: 6,804

6 March 1976 34	Watford	0–1	Northampton Town	Watford
15:00 GMT			J.Hall	Stadium: Vicarage Road; Attendance: 7,389

9 March 1976 35	Doncaster Rovers	0–4	Northampton Town	Doncaster
19:30 GMT			P.Stratford; A.McGowan	Stadium: Belle Vue; Attendance: 8,737

12 March 1976 36	Northampton Town	1–1	Tranmere Rovers	Northampton
19:30 GMT	S.Phillips		B.Mitchell	Stadium: County Ground; Attendance: 8,047

17 March 1976 37	Lincoln City	3–1	Northampton Town	Lincoln
19:30 GMT	J.Fleming; D.Krzywicki; D.Smith		P.Stratford	Stadium: Sincil Bank; Attendance: 13,880

20 March 1976 38	Northampton Town	6–0	Bournemouth	Northampton
15:00 GMT	J.Hall; B.Best; P.Stratford			Stadium: County Ground; Attendance: 6,780

27 March 1976 39	Crewe Alexandra	0–1	Northampton Town	Crewe
15:00 GMT			B.Best	Stadium: Gresty Road; Attendance: 2,865

3 April 1976 40	Northampton Town	1–1	Huddersfield Town	Northampton
15:00 BST	S.Phillips		R.Belfitt	Stadium: County Ground; Attendance: 7,218

6 April 1976 41	Northampton Town	2–2	Torquay United	Northampton
19:30 BST	S.Phillips; J.Gregory		L.Chatterley; P.Kruse	Stadium: County Ground; Attendance: 6,263

20 April 1976 42	Bradford City	1–2	Northampton Town	Bradford
15:00 BST	J.Cooke		J.Hall	Stadium: Valley Parade; Attendance: 3,175

15 April 1976 43	Northampton Town	4–1	Reading	Northampton
19:30 BST	A.McGowan; P.Stratford; D.Martin		R.Hiron	Stadium: County Ground; Attendance: 9,548

17 April 1976 44	Northampton Town	5–2	Hartlepool United	Northampton
15:00 BST	A.Starling pen.' D.Martin pen.' S.Robertson		M.Moore; K.Johnson pen.'	Stadium: County Ground; Attendance: 7,555

20 April 1976 45	Newport County	1–1	Northampton Town	Newport, Wales
19:30 BST	R.Jones		D.Martin pen.'	Stadium: Somerton Park; Attendance: 1,728

23 April 1976 46	Northampton Town	4–0	Stockport County	Northampton
19:30 BST	P.Stratford; D.Martin			Stadium: County Ground; Attendance: 7,680; Referee: John Homewood

=== FA Cup ===
22 November 1975 First round	Brentford	2–0	Northampton Town	Brentford
15:00 GMT	G.Sweetzer			Stadium: Griffin Park; Attendance: 6,640

=== League Cup ===
19 August 1975 First round 1st leg	Watford	2–0	Northampton Town	Watford
19:30 BST	B.Downes; B.Greenhalgh			Stadium: Vicarage Road; Attendance: 3,368

27 August 1975 First round 2nd leg	Northampton Town	1–1	Watford	Northampton
19:30 BST	J.Hall		K.Goodeve	Stadium: County Ground; Attendance: 4,255

=== Appearances and goals ===
Pos	Player	Division Four			FA Cup			League Cup			Total		
Pos	Player	Starts	Sub	Goals	Starts	Sub	Goals	Starts	Sub	Goals	Starts	Sub	Goals
GK	Jeff Parton	3	–	–	–	–	–	2	–	–	5	–	–
GK	Alan Starling	43	–	1	1	–	–	–	–	–	44	–	1
DF	Dave Carlton	30	4	1	1	–	–	1	–	–	32	4	1
DF	John Gregory	45	–	3	1	–	–	2	–	–	48	–	3
DF	Stuart Robertson	44	–	7	1	–	–	2	–	–	47	–	7
DF	Barry Tucker	46	–	1	1	–	–	2	–	–	49	–	1
MF	Billy Best	44	–	8	1	–	–	2	–	–	47	–	8
MF	Derrick Christie	12	7	1	1	–	–	2	–	–	15	7	1
MF	John Farrington	36	2	4	1	–	–	2	–	–	39	2	4
MF	Graham Felton	8	2	1	1	–	–	–	–	–	9	2	1
MF	Andy McGowan	38	4	4	1	–	–	–	–	–	39	4	4
MF	Don Martin	28	1	7	–	–	–	–	–	–	28	1	7
FW	Jim Hall	43	–	21	1	–	–	2	–	1	46	–	22
FW	Steve Phillips	34	–	7	–	–	–	–	–	–	34	–	7
FW	Paul Stratford	30	–	16	–	–	–	2	–	–	32	–	16
Players who left before end of season:
DF	Gary Anderson	3	–	–	–	–	–	2	–	–	5	–	–
DF	Neil Davids	9	–	–	–	–	–	–	–	–	9	–	–
FW	Gary Mabee	–	1	–	–	–	–	1	–	–	1	1	–
FW	Alan Mayes	10	–	4	–	–	–	–	–	–	10	–	4
