= 1974–75 Northampton Town F.C. season =

Northampton Town
1974–75 season
- Chairman: Neville Ronson
- Manager: Bill Dodgin Jr.
- Stadium: County Ground
- Division Four: 16th
- FA Cup: Second round
- League Cup: Second round
- Top goalscorer: League: Paul Stratford (15); All: Paul Stratford (16)
- Highest home attendance: 7,275 vs Lincoln City
- Lowest home attendance: 2,482 vs Newport County
- Average home league attendance: 4,179

The 1974–75 season was Northampton Town's 78th season in their history and the sixth successive season in the Fourth Division. Alongside competing in Division Four, the club also participated in the FA Cup and League Cup.

== Players ==
As of match played 25 April 1975.

Name	Position	Nat.	Place of Birth	Date of Birth (Age)	Apps	Goals	Previous club	Date signed	Fee
Goalkeepers
Alan Starling	GK	(England)	Dagenham	2 April 1951 (aged 24)	185	0	Luton Town	June 1971	
Defenders
Gary Anderson	RB	(England)	London	20 October 1955 (aged 19)	11	0	Tottenham Hotspur	March 1975	
Wayne Cegielski	CB	(Wales)	Tredegar	11 January 1956 (aged 19)	11	0	Tottenham Hotspur	March 1975	Loan
John Gregory	U	(England)	Scunthorpe	11 May 1954 (aged 20)	105	2	Apprentice	Summer 1972	N/A
John Moore	CB	(Scotland)	Harthill	21 December 1943 (aged 31)	16	0	Luton Town	August 1974	
Alan Oman	FB	(England)	Newcastle upon Tyne	6 October 1952 (aged 22)	96	3	Apprentice	October 1970	N/A
Stuart Robertson	CB	(England)	Nottingham	16 December 1946 (aged 28)	102	9	Doncaster Rovers	Summer 1972	
Barry Tucker	FB	(Wales)	Swansea	28 August 1952 (aged 22)	112	1	Apprentice	August 1970	N/A
Ray Tumbridge	LB	(England)	London	6 March 1955 (aged 20)	11	0	Charlton Athletic	March 1975	Loan
Midfielders
Billy Best (c)	U	(Scotland)	Glasgow	7 September 1942 (aged 32)	142	33	Southend United	Summer 1973	
Dave Carlton	CM	(England)	Stepney	24 November 1952 (aged 22)	70	5	Fulham	October 1973	
Derrick Christie	W	(England)	Bletchley	15 March 1957 (aged 18)	19	0	Apprentice	January 1974	N/A
John Farrington	W	(England)	Lynemouth	19 June 1947 (aged 27)	36	3	Cardiff City	Summer 1974	
Graham Felton	W	(England)	Cambridge	1 March 1949 (aged 26)	275	26	Apprentice	September 1966	N/A
Robin Wainwright	CM	(England)	Luton	9 March 1951 (aged 24)	35	5	Millwall	February 1974	
Forwards
Jim Hall	FW	(England)	Northampton	21 March 1945 (aged 30)	64	10	Peterborough United	January 1975	
Malcolm John	FW	(Wales)	Bridgend	9 December 1950 (aged 24)	43	8	Bristol Rovers	March 1974	Free
Gary Mabee	FW	(England)	Oxford	1 February 1955 (aged 20)	36	13	Tottenham Hotspur	August 1974	
Paul Stratford	FW	(England)	Northampton	4 September 1955 (aged 19)	108	32	Apprentice	Summer 1972	N/A

== Competitions ==
=== Division Four ===
==== League table ====
Pos	Team	Pld	W	D	L	GF	GA	GAv	Pts
14	Torquay United	46	14	14	18	46	61	0.754	42
15	Barnsley	46	15	11	20	62	65	0.954	41
16	Northampton Town	46	15	11	20	67	73	0.918	41
17	Doncaster Rovers	46	14	12	20	65	79	0.823	40
18	Crewe Alexandra	46	11	18	17	34	47	0.723	40

Source: rsssf.com

==== Results summary ====
Overall								Home						Away					
Pld	W	D	L	GF	GA	GAv	Pts	W	D	L	GF	GA	Pts	W	D	L	GF	GA	Pts
46	15	11	20	67	73	0.918	41	12	6	5	43	22	30	3	5	15	24	51	11

Last updated: 3 February 2024.

==== League position by match ====
Round	1	2	3	4	5	6	7	8	9	10	11	12	13	14	15	16	17	18	19	20	21	22	23	24	25	26	27	28	29	30	31	32	33	34	35	36	37	38	39	40	41	42	43	44	45	46
Ground	A	H	A	H	A	H	H	A	H	A	H	A	A	H	A	A	H	H	A	H	A	A	H	A	H	H	A	A	H	H	A	H	H	A	A	H	H	A	H	A	A	H	H	A	A	H
Result	L	L	L	W	D	D	W	W	W	W	W	L	D	W	L	W	L	W	D	W	D	L	W	L	D	D	L	L	L	W	L	D	L	L	L	L	W	L	W	L	D	D	D	L	L	W
Position	23	23	24	19	20	22	16	16	11	9	5	10	8	6	6	4	6	6	5	5	6	9	6	8	7	7	10	11	13	10	12	12	13	14	18	18	15	18	14	16	13	14	13	13	18	16

Source: 11v11.com
A = Away; H = Home; W = Win; D = Draw; L = Loss

==== Matches ====
Win Draw Loss

17 August 1974 1	Brentford	1–0	Northampton Town	Brentford, London
15:00 BST	A.Woon			Stadium: Griffin Park; Attendance: 5,147

24 August 1974 2	Northampton Town	1–2	Bradford City	Northampton
15:00 BST	B.Best			Stadium: County Ground; Attendance: 4,408

31 August 1974 3	Reading	3–2	Northampton Town	Reading
15:00 BST			B.Wagstaff o.g.' P.Stratford	Stadium: Elm Park; Attendance: 5,464

6 September 1974 4	Northampton Town	3–0	Darlington	Northampton
19:30 BST	Mabee; P.Stratford; D.Carlton			Stadium: County Ground; Attendance: 4,003

14 September 1974 5	Lincoln City	2–2	Northampton Town	Lincoln
15:00 BST			P.Neal pen.'	Stadium: Sincil Bank; Attendance: 3,113

21 September 1974 6	Northampton Town	3–3	Shrewsbury Town	Northampton
15:00 BST	P.Stratford; B.Best; D.Carlton			Stadium: County Ground; Attendance: 4,001

24 September 1974 7	Northampton Town	2–0	Doncaster Rovers	Northampton
19:30 BST	Mabee; J.Buchanan			Stadium: County Ground; Attendance: 4,269

28 September 1974 8	Torquay United	0–1	Northampton Town	Torquay
15:00 BST			R.Wainwright	Stadium: Plainmoor; Attendance: 3,004

1 October 1974 9	Northampton Town	3–0	Workington	Northampton
19:30 BST	P.Stratford			Stadium: County Ground; Attendance: 4,783

5 October 1974 10	Rotherham United	1–3	Northampton Town	Rotherham
15:00 BST			Mabee; D.Carlton	Stadium: Millmoor; Attendance: 4,934

11 October 1974 11	Northampton Town	4–1	Stockport County	Northampton
19:30 BST	P.Stratford; J.Buchanan; M.John; Mabee			Stadium: County Ground; Attendance: 5,846

18 October 1974 12	Newport County	2–1	Northampton Town	Newport, Wales
19:15 BST	E.Woods; P.Passey		P.Stratford	Stadium: Somerton Park; Attendance: 2,149

21 October 1974 13	Rochdale	2–2	Northampton Town	Rochdale
19:30 BST	G.Cooper; S.Horne		G.Mabee; R.Wainwright	Stadium: Spotland; Attendance: 1,379

26 October 1974 14	Northampton Town	5–1	Swansea City	Northampton
15:00 BST	P.Stratford; Mabee; J.Farrington; R.Wainwright			Stadium: County Ground; Attendance: 5,096

28 October 1974 15	Mansfield Town	3–0	Northampton Town	Mansfield
19:30 GMT	R.Clarke; C.Foster; T.Eccles			Stadium: Field Mill; Attendance: 5,310

1 November 1974 16	Cambridge United	3–4	Northampton Town	Cambridge
19:30 GMT	B.Baston; B.Shinton		Mabee; D.Carlton; P.Stratford	Stadium: Abbey Stadium; Attendance: 3,589; Referee: Derek Richardson

5 November 1974 17	Northampton Town	0–1	Rochdale	Northampton
19:30 GMT			T.Whelan	Stadium: County Ground; Attendance: 5,695

9 November 1974 18	Northampton Town	2–0	Chester	Northampton
15:00 GMT	B.Tucker pen.' R.Wainwright			Stadium: County Ground; Attendance: 5,240

15 November 1974 19	Southport	0–0	Northampton Town	Southport
19:30 GMT				Stadium: Haig Avenue; Attendance: 1,851

29 November 1974 20	Northampton Town	3–0	Crewe Alexandra	Northampton
19:30 GMT	Mabee; P.Stratford			Stadium: County Ground; Attendance: 5,037

7 December 1974 21	Exeter City	2–2	Northampton Town	Exeter
15:00 GMT			R.Wainwright; B.Best	Stadium: St James Park; Attendance: 3,497

21 December 1974 22	Barnsley	5–1	Northampton Town	Barnsley
15:15 GMT			P.Stratford	Stadium: Oakwell; Attendance: 2,666

26 December 1974 23	Northampton Town	1–0	Lincoln City	Northampton
15:00 GMT	P.Stratford			Stadium: County Ground; Attendance: 7,275

1 January 1975 24	Hartlepool	2–0	Northampton Town	Hartlepool
15:00 GMT				Stadium: Victoria Park; Attendance: 5,178
Note: Fixture was previously postponed on December 28, 1974.

4 January 1975 25	Northampton Town	0–0	Brentford	Northampton
15:00 GMT				Stadium: County Ground; Attendance: 4,735

11 January 1975 26	Northampton Town	1–1	Exeter City	Northampton
15:00 GMT	B.Best			Stadium: County Ground; Attendance: 4,104

18 January 1975 27	Crewe Alexandra	3–1	Northampton Town	Crewe
15:00 GMT			Mabee	Stadium: Gresty Road; Attendance: 1,859

1 February 1975 28	Chester	4–1	Northampton Town	Chester
15:00 GMT	D.Lennard; T.Owen; J.James pen.'		J.Hall	Stadium: Sealand Road; Attendance: 5,209

8 February 1975 29	Northampton Town	1–2	Cambridge United	Northampton
15:00 GMT	J.Farrington		T.Horsfall	Stadium: County Ground; Attendance: 4,126

11 February 1975 30	Northampton Town	3–0	Scunthorpe United	Northampton
19:30 GMT	S.Robertson; J.Hall			Stadium: County Ground; Attendance: 3,079
Note: Fixture was previously postponed on January 25, 1975.

15 February 1975 31	Scunthorpe United	2–1	Northampton Town	Scunthorpe
15:15 GMT			B.Best	Stadium: Old Show Ground; Attendance: 1,975

22 February 1975 32	Northampton Town	1–1	Southport	Northampton
15:00 GMT	J.Hall			Stadium: County Ground; Attendance: 3,320

28 February 1975 33	Northampton Town	0–3	Reading	Northampton
19:30 GMT				Stadium: County Ground; Attendance: 3,039

8 March 1975 34	Doncaster Rovers	2–0	Northampton Town	Doncaster
15:00 GMT				Stadium: Belle Vue; Attendance: 5,319

22 March 1975 35	Darlington	2–0	Northampton Town	Darlington
15:00 BST				Stadium: Feethams; Attendance: 1,582

25 March 1975 36	Northampton Town	0–2	Mansfield Town	Northampton
19:30 BST			K.Griffin; G.Hodgson	Stadium: County Ground; Attendance: 3,846

28 March 1975 37	Northampton Town	2–1	Barnsley	Northampton
19:30 BST	B.Best; J.Farrington			Stadium: County Ground; Attendance: 2,594

31 March 1975 38	Shrewsbury Town	6–0	Northampton Town	Shrewsbury
19:30 BST				Stadium: Gay Meadow; Attendance: 4,315

1 April 1975 39	Northampton Town	3–0	Hartlepool	Northampton
19:30 BST	M.John; B.Best			Stadium: County Ground; Attendance: 2,758

5 April 1975 40	Swansea City	1–0	Northampton Town	Swansea, Wales
15:00 BST				Stadium: Vetch Field; Attendance: 1,591

9 April 1975 41	Workington	2–2	Northampton Town	Workington
19:15 BST			P.Stratford; B.Best	Stadium: Borough Park; Attendance: 1,455; Referee: Ted Jolly

12 April 1975 42	Northampton Town	1–1	Rotherham United	Northampton
15:00 BST	J.Gregory pen.'			Stadium: County Ground; Attendance: 3,714

15 April 1975 43	Northampton Town	1–1	Torquay United	Northampton
19:30 BST	A.Oman			Stadium: County Ground; Attendance: 2,658

18 April 1975 44	Stockport County	1–0	Northampton Town	Stockport
19:30 BST				Stadium: Edgeley Park; Attendance: 1,978

23 April 1975 45	Bradford City	2–1	Northampton Town	Bradford
19:30 BST			M.John	Stadium: Valley Parade; Attendance: 1,697

25 April 1975 46	Northampton Town	3–2	Newport County	Northampton
19:30 BST	P.Stratford; D.Carlton; B.Best		J.Parsons; E.Woods	Stadium: County Ground; Attendance: 2,482

=== FA Cup ===
23 November 1974 First round	Torquay United	0–1	Northampton Town	Torquay
15:00 GMT			J.Gregory	Stadium: Plainmoor; Attendance: 2,659

14 December 1974 Second round	Rotherham United	2–1	Northampton Town	Rotherham
15:00 GMT			P.Stratford	Stadium: Millmoor; Attendance: 4,741

=== League Cup ===
20 August 1974 First round	Northampton Town	1–0	Port Vale	Northampton
19:45 BST	S.Robertson			Stadium: County Ground; Attendance: 5,688

10 September 1974 Second round	Northampton Town	2–2	Blackburn Rovers	Northampton
19:30 BST	P.Neal o.g.'			Stadium: County Ground; Attendance: 5,706

18 September 1974 Second round (r)	Blackburn Rovers	1–0	Northampton Town	Blackburn
19:30 BST				Stadium: Ewood Park; Attendance: 5,706

=== Appearances and goals ===
Pos	Player	Division Four			FA Cup			League Cup			Total		
Pos	Player	Starts	Sub	Goals	Starts	Sub	Goals	Starts	Sub	Goals	Starts	Sub	Goals
GK	Alan Starling	45	–	–	2	–	–	3	–	–	50	–	–
DF	Gary Anderson	11	–	–	–	–	–	–	–	–	11	–	–
DF	Wayne Cegielski	11	–	–	–	–	–	–	–	–	11	–	–
DF	John Gregory	41	–	1	2	–	1	3	–	–	46	–	2
DF	John Moore	14	–	–	–	–	–	2	–	–	16	–	–
DF	Alan Oman	21	–	1	2	–	–	–	–	–	23	–	1
DF	Stuart Robertson	31	–	1	2	–	–	1	–	1	34	–	2
DF	Barry Tucker	38	–	1	2	–	–	3	–	–	43	–	1
DF	Ray Tumbridge	11	–	–	–	–	–	–	–	–	11	–	–
MF	Billy Best	46	–	9	2	–	–	3	–	–	51	–	9
MF	Dave Carlton	31	1	5	1	–	–	2	–	–	34	1	5
MF	Derrick Christie	12	2	–	2	–	–	–	–	–	14	2	–
MF	John Farrington	34	–	3	2	–	–	–	–	–	36	–	3
MF	Graham Felton	10	1	–	–	–	–	3	–	–	13	1	–
MF	Robin Wainwright	23	8	5	2	–	–	1	–	–	26	8	5
FW	Jim Hall	5	–	4	–	–	–	–	–	–	5	–	4
FW	Malcolm John	21	7	4	2	–	–	–	–	–	23	7	4
FW	Gary Mabee	29	3	13	1	–	–	2	1	–	32	4	13
FW	Paul Stratford	44	–	15	2	–	1	3	–	–	49	–	16
Players who left before end of season:
GK	Stuart Garnham	1	–	–	–	–	–	–	–	–	1	–	–
DF	John Clarke	4	2	–	–	–	–	1	–	–	5	2	–
DF	Tom Kilkelly	2	2	–	–	–	–	–	–	–	2	2	–
DF	Phil Neal	10	–	2	–	–	–	3	–	1	13	–	3
MF	John Buchanan	11	–	2	–	–	–	3	–	–	14	–	2
