= List of Newport County A.F.C. players =

This is a list of notable players of Newport County Football Club.

== Newport County Hall of Fame ==
The Newport County Hall of Fame was launched on 3 April 2009 by Andrew Taylor, club programme columnist and author of Look Back in Amber: Memories of Newport County. Fans can nominate players to be considered by a committee. To date there have been five sets of inductions with further inductions planned regularly.

Player	Inducted	Newport County career	League Appearances	League Goals	Notes
(England) Tommy Tynan	3 Apr 2009	1978–1983	183	66	
(Wales) Albert Derrick (Senior)	18 Sep 2009	1935–1945	145	57	Posthumous
(Wales) Roddy Jones	18 Sep 2009	1969–1979	323	71	
(Wales) Chris Lilygreen	18 Sep 2009	1983–1993	211	98	
(Wales) Ken Morgans	18 Sep 2009	1964–1967	141	46	
(England) Kevin Moore	18 Sep 2009	1978–1983	148	14	
(Wales) Dave Williams	18 Sep 2009	1960–1973	306	2	
(England) John Relish	18 Sep 2009	1974–1987	338	9	
(England) Keith Oakes	27 Oct 2012	1978–1984	232	27	
(England) Mark Price	27 Oct 2012	1990–1996	275	46	
(Wales) Nathan Davies	27 Oct 2012	1998–2010	383	16	
(Wales) Len Weare	27 Oct 2012	1955–1970	525	0	Posthumous
(England) Craig Reid	27 Oct 2012	2008–2011	112	66	
(Wales) Tony Gilbert	27 Oct 2012	1970–2013	N/A	N/A	Kit Manager
(Wales) David Pipe	2 Apr 2015	2011–2014	100	0	
(England) Gary Plumley	2 Apr 2015	1976–1982, 1984–1985, 1987	187	0	
(Wales) Graham Coldrick	2 Apr 2015	1970–1975	157	10	
(England) Richard Walden	2 Apr 2015	1978–1982	151	2	Posthumous
(England) Christian Jolley	2 Apr 2015	2012–2015	61	15	
(Wales) Steve Lowndes	2 Apr 2015	1977–1983, 1992–1996	358	51	
(Wales) Norman Parselle	2 Apr 2015	1986–1988, 1989–1991, mid 90s	N/A	N/A	
(Wales) David Hando	2 Apr 2015	N/A	N/A	N/A	Honorary President
(Wales) Andrew Taylor	17 Oct 2015	N/A	N/A	N/A	Club Historian, Secretary of Former Players' Association
(England) Justin Edinburgh	29 Dec 2019	2011–2015 (manager)	N/A	N/A	Posthumous

== International honours ==
=== Full internationals ===
The following players received the following full international caps while playing for Newport County:

- (Wales) Ron Hugh (1 cap)
- (Wales) Tudor Martin (1 cap)
- (Wales) Jack Nicholls (2 caps)
- (Wales) Fred Cook (2 caps)
- (Wales) Harold Williams (2 caps)
- (Wales) Alf Sherwood (2 caps)
- (Wales) Steve Lowndes (2 caps)
- (Wales) Nigel Vaughan (3 caps)
- (Antigua and Barbuda) Calaum Jahraldo-Martin (1 cap)
- (Guyana) Keanu Marsh-Brown (1 caps)
- (Wales) Josh Sheehan (2 caps)
- (Malta) Luke Gambin (1 cap)
- (Antigua and Barbuda) Nick Townsend (8 caps)
- (Guyana) Nathan Moriah-Welsh (1 cap)

=== Semi-pro internationals ===
The following players have received semi-pro international caps while playing for Newport County:

- (England) Paul Bignot
- (Wales) Nathan Davies
- (Wales) Lee Evans*
- (England) Charlie Henry
- (Wales) Andrew Hughes
- (Wales) Craig Hughes
- (England) Christian Jolley
- (Wales) Ian Hillier
- (England) Danny Rose
- (Wales) Garry Shephard
- (Wales) Ben Swallow
- (Wales) Andrew Thomas

=== Youth internationals ===
The following players have received schoolboy, under 17, under 19 or under 21 international caps while playing for Newport County:

- (Wales) Gethin Jones
- (Wales) Andrew Hughes
- (Wales) Keiron Blackburn
- (Wales) Ryan Newman
- (Wales) Jamie Davies
- (Wales) Lee Evans*
- (Wales) Regan Poole*
- (Wales) Aaron Collins
- (Wales) Liam Angel
- (Wales) Josh Sheehan*
- (Wales) Jay Foulston
- (Wales) Momodou Touray
- (Wales) Mark Harris*
- (Republic of Ireland) Danny McNamara
- (Wales) Lewis Collins
- (Wales) Brandon Cooper
- (Wales) Lewys Twamley
- (Wales) Sonny Lewis
- (Wales) Matt Baker
- (Wales) Ben Lloyd
- (Wales) Tanatswa Nyakuhwa

== PFA Team of the Year ==
The following players were selected for the PFA Team of the Year whilst playing for Newport County:

- 1973–74 (Wales) Brian Godfrey (Fourth Division)
- 1979–80 (England) Keith Oakes (Fourth Division)
- 1985–86 (Wales) Terry Boyle (Third Division)
- 2020–21 (Wales) Josh Sheehan (League Two)
- 2021–22 (England) Dom Telford (League Two)

== Newport County Player of the Year ==
The following players were selected by the Supporters Trust as the official Newport County player of the year at the club's annual end of season awards presentation evening:

- 2010 (England) Gary Warren
- 2011 (England) Paul Bignot
- 2012 (Wales) David Pipe
- 2013 (Wales) Tony James
- 2014 (England) Chris Zebroski
- 2015 (Wales) Darren Jones
- 2016 (Republic of Ireland) Mark Byrne
- 2017 (England) Dan Butler
- 2018 (England) Dan Butler
- 2019 (Republic of Ireland) Pádraig Amond
- 2020 (England) Scot Bennett
- 2021 (England) Matty Dolan
- 2022 (England) Cameron Norman
- 2023 (England) Cameron Norman
- 2024 (Antigua and Barbuda) Nick Townsend
- 2025 (Antigua and Barbuda) Nick Townsend
- 2026 (Wales) Lee Jenkins

== Football League appearances for Newport County ==
=== Over 200 football league appearances since 1989 ===
- (England) Scot Bennett 300
- (England) Joe Day 266
- (England) Mickey Demetriou 258
- (England) Robbie Willmott 223

=== Over 100 football league appearances since 1989 (as at 22 November 2026) ===
- (England) Matty Dolan 175
- (Antigua and Barbuda) Nick Townsend* 169
- (Republic of Ireland) Pádraig Amond 162
- (Wales) Josh Sheehan* 142
- (Wales) Matt Baker 129
- (England) Dan Butler 129
- (England) Joss Labadie 122
- (England) James Clarke 119
- (Wales) David Pipe* 110
- (England) Cameron Norman 107
- (England) Ryan Haynes 103
- (Republic of Ireland) Mark O'Brien 103

=== Over 200 football league appearances before 1989 ===
- (Wales) Len Weare 525
- (Wales) Ray Wilcox 488
- (Wales) John Rowland 463
- (Wales) Len Hill 366
- (England) John Relish 337
- (Wales) Dave Williams 306
- (Wales) Roddy Jones 288
- (Wales) John Bird 276
- (Wales) Billy Shergold* 274
- (Wales) Mark Kendall 272
- (England) Doug Hayward 260
- (Wales) Andy White 253
- (England) Granville Smith 241
- (Wales) Danny Newall 233
- (England) Keith Oakes 232
- (Wales) Ken Hollyman 231
- (Wales) Nigel Vaughan* 224
- (Wales) Jeff Thomas 209
- (Wales) Steve Lowndes* 208
- (Wales) Alf Sherwood* 205
- (Wales) Reg Parker 201

=== Over 100 football league appearances before 1989 ===
- (Wales) Steve Aizlewood
- (Republic of Ireland) John Aldridge*
- (England) Neil Bailey
- (Scotland) George Beattie
- (England) Gary Bell
- (Wales) Cliff Birch
- (Wales) Stan Bowsher*
- (Wales) Terry Boyle*
- (Scotland) Gordon Brown
- (Scotland) Willie Brown
- (England) Roy Carter
- (Wales) Graham Coldrick
- (England) Grant Davies
- (Wales) Albert Derrick (Senior)
- (England) Cecil Dixon
- (England) Tom Docherty
- (Republic of Ireland) (Northern Ireland) Harry Duggan*
- (England) Ernie Edwards
- (Wales) Karl Elsey
- (England) Harry Fearnley
- (England) Howard Goddard
- (Wales) Dave Gwyther
- (Scotland) Bobby Harper
- (Wales) Wynne Hooper
- (Wales) Harry Harris
- (Wales) Linden Jones
- (Wales) John Lewis
- (Scotland) Norman Low
- (England) John Macey
- (England) Ken McPherson
- (Scotland) John McSeveney
- (Wales) Beriah Moore
- (England) Kevin Moore
- (Wales) Ken Morgans
- (England) Peter Passey
- (Wales) Dudley Peake
- (England) Gary Plumley
- (Wales) Graham Rathbone
- (England) Les Riggs
- (Wales) Guido Roffi
- (Wales) Alan Smith
- (Wales) Martyn Sprague
- (England) Len Staples
- (Wales) George Thomas
- (England) Tommy Tynan
- (England) Richard Walden
- (Wales) Allen Wood
- (England) Eddie Woods
- (Wales) George Young
