= List of Newport County A.F.C. records and statistics =

This article details records and statistics of Newport County Football Club.

== Honours ==
=== League ===
- Football League Third Division South champions 1939.
- Conference National play-off winners 2013.
- Conference South champions 2010.
- Southern League Midland Division champions 1995; runners-up 1999.
- Hellenic League champions 1990.
- Welsh Football League winners 1928, 1937, 1955, 1975, 1980 (Reserve team).

=== League Performance ===
- Tier 2: 1939–47 (Second Division, 1 full season)
- Tier 3: 1920–21, 1958–62, 1980–87 (Third Division, 12 seasons); 1921–31, 1932–39, 1947–58 (Third Division South, 28 seasons)
- Tier 4: 1962–80, 1987–8 (Fourth Division, 19 seasons); 2013– (League Two, 10 seasons)
- Tier 5: 2010–13 (Conference, 3 full seasons)

=== Cups ===
- Welsh Cup winners 1980; runners-up 1963, 1987.
- FA Trophy runners-up 2012.
- FAW Premier Cup winners 2008; runners-up 2003, 2007.
- Southern League Merit Cup joint holders 1995, 1999.
- Hellenic League Cup winners 1990.
- Gloucestershire Senior Challenge Cup winners 1994.
- Herefordshire Senior Cup winners 2000.
- Welsh Football League Cup winners 1937, 1953, 1958, 1977, 1978; runners-up 1948, 1956, 1973, 1980 (Reserve team)
- Royal Gwent Cup winners 1923, 1925.
- Monmouthshire/ Gwent Senior Cup winners 1921, 1922, 1923, 1924, 1926, 1928, 1932, 1936, 1954, 1958, 1959, 1965, 1968, 1969, 1970, 1972, 1973, 1974, 1997, 1998, 1999, 2000, 2001, 2002, 2004, 2005, 2011, 2012

== Club records ==
- Highest league finish: Joint 9th in Football League Second Division 1939–40 (abandoned season), 22nd in Football League Second Division 1946–47.
- Best FA Cup run: 5th round (last 16)
  - 1948–49; Defeat after extra time vs. Portsmouth, 12 February 1949 (in front of a then-record attendance of 48,581 at Fratton Park).
  - 2018–19; Defeat by Manchester City, the eventual FA Cup winners that season, 16 February 2019.
- Best League Cup run: 4th round (last 16)
  - 2020–21; Defeat by penalties after drawing 1–1 in normal time against Newcastle United, 30 September 2020.
- Best EFL Trophy run: Semi-final (last 4)
  - 1984–85; Defeat by Brentford, 17 May 1985.
  - 2019–20; Defeat by penalties after drawing 0–0 in normal time against Salford City, the eventual EFL Trophy winners that season, 19 February 2020.

=== Match records ===
Newport County scores are shown first in every match

==== Firsts ====
- First Football League match: 0–1 vs. Reading, 28 August 1920 (Football League Third Division).
- First FA Cup match: 6–1 vs. Mond Nickel Works, 1st Qualifying round, 27 Sep 1913.
- First League Cup match: 2–2 vs. Southampton, 10 October 1960.
- First Welsh Cup match: 1–0 vs. Mardy, Extra preliminary round, 1912.
- First European match: 4–0 vs. Crusaders 16 September 1980 (European Cup Winners' Cup).

==== Record results ====
- Record League victory: 10–0 vs. Merthyr Town, 10 April 1930 (Football League Third Division South).
- Record FA Cup victory: 7–0 vs. Woking, 24 November 1928 (FA Cup round 1).
- Record League Cup victory: 6–0 (8–1 aggregate) vs. Exeter City, 14 September 1982 (League Cup round 1, 2nd leg).
- Record European Cup Winners' Cup victory: 6–0 vs. Haugar (Norway), 4 November 1980.
- Record League defeat: 0–13 vs. Newcastle United, 5 October 1946 (Football League Second Division).
- Record FA Cup defeat: 1–8 vs. Brighton & Hove Albion, 19 September 1955 (FA Cup round 1).
- Record League Cup defeat: 0–8 vs. Southampton, 25 August 2021 (League Cup round 2).

=== Season records ===
- Longest stretch of wins (Football League): 10, 22 February 1980 – 12 April 1980.
- Longest stretch of wins (non-league): 14, 16 November 1994 – 21 January 1995.
- Longest stretch without loss (Football League): 17, 15 March 2019 – 14 September 2019.
- Longest stretch without loss (non-league): 21, 31 October 2009 – 15 March 2010.

=== Attendance records ===
- Record League Attendance Somerton Park: 24,268 vs. Cardiff City, 16 October 1937 (Football League Third Division South).
- Record Cup Attendance Somerton Park: 24,000 vs. Tottenham Hotspur, 9 January 1960 (FA Cup round 3).
- Record League Attendance Newport Stadium: 4,221 vs. Havant & Waterlooville, 15 March 2010 (Conference South).
- Record Cup Attendance Newport Stadium: 4,616 vs. Swansea City, 11 November 2006 (FA Cup round 1).
- Record League Attendance Rodney Parade: 9,537 vs. Wrexham, 20 January 2024 (Football League Two).
- Record Cup Attendance Rodney Parade: 9,836 vs. Tottenham Hotspur, 27 January 2018 (FA Cup round 4).

=== European matches ===
Newport County scores are shown first in every match

Season	Competition	Round	Country	Club	Home result	Away result	Aggregate
1980–1981	European Cup Winners' Cup	1R	(Northern Ireland)	Crusaders F.C.	4–0	0–0	4–0
1980–1981	European Cup Winners' Cup	2R	(Norway)	SK Haugar	6–0	0–0	6–0
1980–1981	European Cup Winners' Cup	QF	(East Germany)	FC Carl Zeiss Jena	0–1	2–2	2–3

== Player records ==
=== Most League appearances ===
As of 27 April 2024. (League matches only, includes appearances as substitute):

	Name	Career	Appearances	Goals
1	(Wales) Len Weare	1955–1970	526	0
2	(Wales) Ray Wilcox	1946–1959	489	0
3	(Wales) John Rowland	1958–1969	463	9
4	(Wales) Len Hill	1962–1974	357	63
5	(England) John Relish	1974–1990	348	9
6	(Wales) Dave Williams	1960–1973	306	2
7	(Wales) Nathan Davies*	1998–2010	304	14

- Nathan Davies appearances were below the English Football League ie below tier 4 of the English football league system.

=== Most League Goals ===
As of 24 February 2024. (League goals only):

	Name	Career	Appearances	Goals	Goals/game
1	(Wales) Reg Parker	1948–1954	201	99	0.49
2	(Wales) Chris Lilygreen	1983–1993	176	72	0.41
3	(Republic of Ireland) John Aldridge	1979–1983	170	69	0.41
4	(Wales) Rod Jones	1969–1978	288	68	0.24
5	(England) Tommy Tynan	1979–1983	183	66	0.36
6	(Wales) Jimmy Gittins	1921–1933	253	65	0.26
7	(England) Craig Reid	2008–2011	96	58	0.60

=== Transfer records ===
==== Pre 1989 ====
- Paid: £80,000 to Swansea City for Alan Waddle, December 1980. As of September 2017, the Waddle signing means Newport County holds the record for the oldest club record transfer fee among Football League clubs.
- Received: £78,000 from Oxford United for John Aldridge, 21 March 1984.

==== Post 1989 ====
- Paid: £20,000+ (undisclosed) to AFC Wimbledon for Christian Jolley, January 2013.
- Paid: £30,000+ (undisclosed) to Peterborough United for Joe Day, December 2014.
- Received: £100,000+ (undisclosed) from Stevenage for Craig Reid, 31 January 2011.
- Received: £100,000+ (undisclosed) from Blackpool for Paul Bignot, 22 July 2011.
- Received: £100,000+ (undisclosed) from Wolverhampton Wanderers for Lee Evans, 31 January 2013.
- Received: £100,000+ (undisclosed) from Manchester United for Regan Poole, 1 September 2015.
- Received: £100,000+ (undisclosed) from Wolverhampton Wanderers for Aaron Collins, 22 January 2016.
- Received: £500,000+ (undisclosed) from Peterborough United for Conor Washington, 28 January 2014.

=== PFA Team of the Year ===
See: List of Newport County A.F.C. players

=== International player honours ===
See: List of Newport County A.F.C. players

== See also ==
- Newport County A.F.C. seasons

== Sources ==
- Newport County A.F.C.
- Statto.com: Newport County
- Football Club History Database
- Welsh Football Data Archive
