= 1973–74 Northampton Town F.C. season =

Northampton Town
1973–74 season
- Chairman: Neville Ronson
- Manager: Bill Dodgin Jr.
- Stadium: County Ground
- Division Four: 5th
- FA Cup: Second round
- League Cup: First round
- Top goalscorer: League: Paul Stratford (13); All: John Buchanan (15); Paul Stratford (15)
- Highest home attendance: 11,378 vs Peterborough United
- Lowest home attendance: 2,995 vs Banbury United
- Average home league attendance: 5,424

The 1973–74 season was Northampton Town's 77th season in their history and the fifth successive season in the Fourth Division. Alongside competing in Division Four, the club also participated in the FA Cup and League Cup.

== Players ==
As of match played 25 April 1975.

Name	Position	Nat.	Place of Birth	Date of Birth (Age)	Apps	Goals	Previous club	Date signed	Fee
Goalkeepers
Alan Starling	GK	(England)	Dagenham	2 April 1951 (aged 23)	135	0	Luton Town	June 1971	
Defenders
Dietmar Bruck	RB	(Germany)	Danzig	19 April 1944 (aged 30)	44	0	Charlton Athletic	June 1972	N/A
John Clarke	CB	(England)	Northampton	23 October 1945 (aged 28)	255	1	Apprentice	July 1965	N/A
John Gregory	U	(England)	Scunthorpe	11 May 1954 (aged 19)	59	0	Apprentice	Summer 1972	N/A
Phil Neal	U	(England)	Irchester	20 February 1951 (aged 23)	195	27	Apprentice	July 1968	N/A
Alan Oman	FB	(England)	Newcastle upon Tyne	6 October 1952 (aged 21)	73	2	Apprentice	October 1970	N/A
Stuart Robertson	CB	(England)	Nottingham	16 December 1946 (aged 27)	68	7	Doncaster Rovers	Summer 1972	
Barry Tucker	FB	(Wales)	Swansea	28 August 1952 (aged 21)	69	0	Apprentice	August 1970	N/A
Midfielders
Billy Best (c)	U	(Scotland)	Glasgow	7 September 1942 (aged 31)	91	24	Southend United	Summer 1973	
John Buchanan	W	(Scotland)	Dingwall	19 September 1951 (aged 22)	112	26	Ross County	October 1970	
Dave Carlton	CM	(England)	Stepney	24 November 1952 (aged 21)	35	0	Fulham	October 1973	
Derrick Christie	W	(England)	Bletchley	15 March 1957 (aged 17)	3	0	Apprentice	January 1974	N/A
Graham Felton	W	(England)	Cambridge	1 March 1949 (aged 25)	261	26	Apprentice	September 1966	N/A
Bobby Park	CM	(Scotland)	Edinburgh	3 July 1946 (aged 27)	25	0	Peterborough United	February 1973	
Robin Wainwright	CM	(England)	Luton	9 March 1951 (aged 23)	1	0	Millwall	February 1974	Loan
Forwards
Tony Buck	FW	(England)	Clowne	18 August 1944 (aged 29)	18	3	Rochdale	January 1973	
Malcolm John	FW	(Wales)	Bridgend	9 December 1950 (aged 23)	13	4	Bristol Rovers	March 1974	Loan
Paul Stratford	FW	(England)	Northampton	4 September 1955 (aged 18)	59	16	Apprentice	Summer 1972	N/A

== Competitions ==
=== Division Four ===
==== League table ====
Pos	Team	Pld	W	D	L	GF	GA	GAv	Pts	Promotion or relegation
3	Colchester United (P)	46	24	12	10	73	36	2.028	60	Promotion to the Third Division
4	Bury (P)	46	24	11	11	81	49	1.653	59	Promotion to the Third Division
5	Northampton Town	46	20	13	13	63	48	1.313	53	
6	Reading	46	16	19	11	58	37	1.568	51	
7	Chester	46	17	15	14	54	55	0.982	49	

Source: rsssf.com
(P) Promoted

==== Results summary ====
Overall								Home						Away					
Pld	W	D	L	GF	GA	GAv	Pts	W	D	L	GF	GA	Pts	W	D	L	GF	GA	Pts
46	20	13	13	63	48	1.313	53	14	7	2	39	14	35	6	6	11	24	34	18

Last updated: 7 February 2024.

==== League position by match ====
Round	1	2	3	4	5	6	7	8	9	10	11	12	13	14	15	16	17	18	19	20	21	22	23	24	25	26	27	28	29	30	31	32	33	34	35	36	37	38	39	40	41	42	43	44	45	46
Ground	H	A	H	H	A	A	H	A	H	H	A	H	A	A	H	A	H	A	H	H	A	A	H	A	H	A	H	H	A	H	A	H	H	A	A	H	H	A	A	H	H	A	A	A	H	A
Result	W	L	D	W	D	D	W	L	W	D	D	L	L	L	W	W	W	L	W	W	L	L	W	L	W	W	D	D	W	W	L	D	W	D	L	W	D	W	W	L	D	W	D	L	W	D
Position	1	11	4	5	7	8	6	7	5	6	7	11	11	12	11	10	9	12	10	9	11	13	11	13	9	9	8	8	5	5	6	6	5	5	5	5	5	5	5	6	6	5	5	6	5	5

Source: 11v11.com
A = Away; H = Home; W = Win; D = Draw; L = Loss

==== Matches ====
Win Draw Loss

25 August 1973 1	Northampton Town	3–1	Rotherham United	Northampton
15:00 BST	S.Robertson; G.Felton; P.Neal			Stadium: County Ground; Attendance: 4,098

1 September 1973 2	Mansfield Town	2–0	Northampton Town	Mansfield
15:00 BST	T.Eccles; D.Roberts			Stadium: Field Mill; Attendance: 3,109

7 September 1973 3	Northampton Town	0–0	Colchester United	Northampton
19:30 BST		Report		Stadium: County Ground; Attendance: 4,916; Referee: Ronnie Marshall

11 September 1973 4	Northampton Town	1–0	Newport County	Northampton
19:30 BST	J.Buchanan			Stadium: County Ground; Attendance: 4,061

14 September 1973 5	Stockport County	2–2	Northampton Town	Stockport
19:30 BST			P.Stratford; G.Riddick	Stadium: Edgeley Park; Attendance: 3,552

18 September 1973 6	Swansea City	1–1	Northampton Town	Swansea, Wales
19:30 BST			S.Robertson	Stadium: Vetch Field; Attendance: 1,301

21 September 1973 7	Northampton Town	2–0	Scunthorpe United	Northampton
19:30 BST	P.Stratford			Stadium: County Ground; Attendance: 5,049

29 September 1973 8	Workington	1–0	Northampton Town	Workington
15:00 BST				Stadium: Borough Park; Attendance: 970

2 October 1973 9	Northampton Town	2–0	Swansea City	Northampton
19:30 BST	J.Buchanan; S.Robertson			Stadium: County Ground; Attendance: 5,287

5 October 1973 10	Northampton Town	0–0	Torquay United	Northampton
19:30 BST				Stadium: County Ground; Attendance: 6,640

13 October 1973 11	Bradford City	1–1	Northampton Town	Bradford
15:00 BST			P.Stratford	Stadium: Valley Parade; Attendance: 3,343

20 October 1973 12	Northampton Town	1–2	Exeter City	Northampton
15:00 BST	P.Stratford			Stadium: County Ground; Attendance: 4,923

23 October 1973 13	Newport County	3–1	Northampton Town	Newport, Wales
19:15 BST	R.Jones; S.Aizlewood; H.Jarman		P.Neal pen.'	Stadium: Somerton Park; Attendance: 3,592

27 October 1973 14	Bury	3–1	Northampton Town	Bury
15:15 BST			P.Stratford	Stadium: Gigg Lane; Attendance: 4,360

3 November 1973 15	Northampton Town	1–0	Hartlepool	Northampton
15:00 GMT	P.Stratford			Stadium: County Ground; Attendance: 3,715

10 November 1973 16	Darlington	2–3	Northampton Town	Darlington
15:00 GMT	P.Neal; J.Buchanan; B.Best			Stadium: Feethams; Attendance: 2,063

13 November 1973 17	Northampton Town	2–1	Barnsley	Northampton
19:30 GMT	A.Oman; J.Clarke			Stadium: County Ground; Attendance: 4,299

17 November 1973 18	Peterborough United	3–0	Northampton Town	Peterborough
14:15 GMT				Stadium: London Road; Attendance: 10,351

8 December 1973 19	Northampton Town	1–0	Lincoln City	Northampton
15:00 GMT	B.Best			Stadium: County Ground; Attendance: 3,464

22 December 1973 20	Northampton Town	1–0	Workington	Northampton
15:00 GMT	D.Krzywicki			Stadium: County Ground; Attendance: 4,038

26 December 1973 21	Gillingham	3–1	Northampton Town	Gillingham
15:00 GMT	B.Yeo		G.Felton	Stadium: Priestfield; Attendance: 11,313

29 December 1973 22	Colchester United	1–0	Northampton Town	Colchester
14:00 GMT	B.Dyson 77' (pen.)	Report		Stadium: Layer Road; Attendance: 5,042; Referee: Brian Martin

1 January 1974 23	Northampton Town	2–0	Mansfield Town	Northampton
15:00 GMT	P.Neal pen.' D.Krzywicki			Stadium: County Ground; Attendance: 6,231

5 January 1974 24	Hartlepool	1–0	Northampton Town	Hartlepool
14:00 GMT				Stadium: Victoria Park; Attendance: 2,078

12 January 1974 25	Northampton Town	2–0	Stockport County	Northampton
14:00 GMT	D.Krzywicki; P.Stratford			Stadium: County Ground; Attendance: 3,396

20 January 1974 26	Rotherham United	1–2	Northampton Town	Rotherham
14:00 GMT			J.Buchanan	Stadium: Millmoor; Attendance: 4,609; Referee: Derek Richardson

27 January 1974 27	Northampton Town	2–2	Reading	Northampton
14:30 GMT	B.Best; P.Stratford			Stadium: County Ground; Attendance: 7,599

2 February 1974 28	Northampton Town	0–0	Brentford	Northampton
14:30 GMT				Stadium: County Ground; Attendance: 4,130

10 February 1974 29	Scunthorpe United	1–2	Northampton Town	Scunthorpe
14:30 GMT			J.Buchanan; P.Stratford	Stadium: Old Show Ground; Attendance: 3,603; Referee: Bob Armstrong

17 February 1974 30	Northampton Town	3–0	Bradford City	Northampton
14:45 GMT	J.Buchanan; P.Neal; S.Robertson			Stadium: County Ground; Attendance: 8,146

24 February 1974 31	Torquay United	1–0	Northampton Town	Torquay
15:00 GMT				Stadium: Plainmoor; Attendance: 4,186; Referee: John Gow

3 March 1974 32	Northampton Town	0–0	Gillingham	Northampton
15:00 GMT				Stadium: County Ground; Attendance: 8,583

9 March 1974 33	Northampton Town	3–1	Bury	Northampton
15:00 GMT	B.Best; J.Buchanan			Stadium: County Ground; Attendance: 4,884

16 March 1974 34	Exeter City	1–1	Northampton Town	Exeter
15:00 GMT			G.Felton	Stadium: St James Park; Attendance: 4,052

18 March 1974 35	Brentford	3–1	Northampton Town	Brentford, London
17:15 BST	R.Cross; D.Simmons; B.Salvage		M.John	Stadium: Griffin Park; Attendance: 3,686

24 March 1974 36	Northampton Town	5–0	Darlington	Northampton
15:00 BST	M.John; B.Best; P.Neal pen.' P.Stratford			Stadium: County Ground; Attendance: 5,416

26 March 1974 37	Northampton Town	3–3	Chester	Northampton
19:30 BST	P.Neal pen.' J.Buchanan; M.John		B.Tucker o.g.' N.Whitehead; J.Redfern	Stadium: County Ground; Attendance: 5,969; Referee: Alan Robinson

3 April 1974 38	Reading	1–2	Northampton Town	Reading
19:30 BST			J.Buchanan	Stadium: Elm Park; Attendance: 7,055

6 April 1974 39	Barnsley	0–2	Northampton Town	Barnsley
15:00 BST			P.Neal; M.John	Stadium: Oakwell; Attendance: 3,646

13 April 1974 40	Northampton Town	0–1	Peterborough United	Northampton
15:00 BST				Stadium: County Ground; Attendance: 11,378; Referee: Terry Bosi

15 April 1974 41	Northampton Town	1–1	Crewe Alexandra	Northampton
15:00 BST	P.Neal			Stadium: County Ground; Attendance: 5,389; Referee: Tony Glasson

16 April 1974 42	Crewe Alexandra	0–2	Northampton Town	Crewe
19:30 BST			P.Stratford	Stadium: Gresty Road; Attendance: 1,498

20 April 1974 43	Lincoln City	1–1	Northampton Town	Lincoln
15:00 BST			G.Felton	Stadium: Sincil Bank; Attendance: 2,530

23 April 1974 44	Doncaster Rovers	2–1	Northampton Town	Doncaster
19:30 BST			P.Stratford	Stadium: Belle Vue; Attendance: 1,561
Note: Fixture was previously postponed on December 1, 1973.

27 April 1974 45	Northampton Town	3–1	Doncaster Rovers	Northampton
15:00 BST	J.Buchanan; B.Best; G.Felton			Stadium: County Ground; Attendance: 3,137; Referee: Peter Walters

1 May 1974 46	Chester	0–0	Northampton Town	Doncaster
19:30 BST				Stadium: Sealand Road; Attendance: 1,928

=== FA Cup ===
24 November 1973 First round	Banbury United	0–0	Northampton Town	Banbury
14:15 GMT				Stadium: Spencer Stadium; Attendance: 4,800

29 November 1973 First round (r)	Northampton Town	3–2	Banbury United	Northampton
13:45 GMT	G.Felton; S.Robertson; B.Best			Stadium: County Ground; Attendance: 2,995

15 December 1973 Second round	Northampton Town	1–2	Bristol Rovers	Northampton
15:00 GMT	J.Buchanan			Stadium: County Ground; Attendance: 6,181

=== League Cup ===
28 August 1973 First round	Grimsby Town	2–1	Northampton Town	Cleethorpes
19:30 BST			J.Buchanan	Stadium: Blundell Park; Attendance: 7,829

=== Appearances and goals ===
Pos	Player	Division Four			FA Cup			League Cup			Total		
Pos	Player	Starts	Sub	Goals	Starts	Sub	Goals	Starts	Sub	Goals	Starts	Sub	Goals
GK	Alan Starling	46	–	–	3	–	–	1	–	–	50	–	–
DF	Dietmar Bruck	15	–	–	–	–	–	1	–	–	16	–	–
DF	John Clarke	39	3	1	1	–	–	–	1	–	40	4	1
DF	John Gregory	46	–	–	3	–	–	1	–	–	50	–	–
DF	Phil Neal	46	–	9	3	–	–	1	–	–	50	–	9
DF	Alan Oman	17	5	1	2	–	–	1	–	–	20	5	1
DF	Stuart Robertson	31	–	4	3	–	1	1	–	–	35	–	5
DF	Barry Tucker	33	1	–	3	–	–	–	–	–	36	1	–
MF	Billy Best	38	1	7	3	–	1	–	–	–	41	1	8
MF	John Buchanan	40	2	13	3	–	1	1	–	1	44	2	15
MF	Dave Carlton	32	–	–	2	–	–	–	–	–	34	–	–
MF	Derrick Christie	1	2	–	–	–	–	–	–	–	1	2	–
MF	Graham Felton	43	1	5	3	–	1	1	–	–	47	1	6
MF	Bobby Park	3	3	–	–	–	–	1	–	–	4	3	–
MF	Robin Wainwright	–	1	–	–	–	–	–	–	–	–	1	–
FW	Tony Buck	1	1	–	1	–	–	–	–	–	2	1	–
FW	Malcolm John	13	–	4	–	–	–	–	–	–	13	–	4
FW	Paul Stratford	45	–	15	3	–	–	1	–	–	49	–	15
Players who left before end of season:
MF	Gordon Riddick	8	–	1	–	–	–	1	–	–	9	–	1
MF	Peter Hawkins	1	–	–	–	–	–	–	–	–	1	–	–
FW	Dick Krzywicki	8	–	3	–	–	–	–	–	–	8	–	3
FW	Derek Watts	–	1	–	–	–	–	–	–	–	–	1	–
