= 1955 in association football =

The following are the association football events of the year 1955 throughout the world.

== Events ==
- March 13 – For the first time in history of Dutch football, professionals are allowed to play for the Netherlands national football team. Against Denmark, Faas Wilkes plays his first international match for the Dutch in six years, after signing in Italy in 1949.
- England - FA Cup: Newcastle United win 3-1 over Manchester City
- September 21 – Dutch club PSV Eindhoven makes its European debut with a defeat (6-1) against Austria's Rapid Wien in the first round of the European Cup.

== Winners club national championship ==
- Argentina – River Plate
- England – Chelsea
- France – Stade de Reims
- Iceland – KR
- Israel – Hapoel Petah Tikva F.C.
- Italy – A.C. Milan
- Scotland – Aberdeen
- Spain – Real Madrid
- West Germany – Rot-Weiß Essen

== Domestic cups ==
- England – Newcastle
- Scotland - Clyde
- Spain – Athletic Bilbao

== International tournaments ==
- 1955 British Home Championship (October 2, 1954 – April 20, 1955)

England

- Pan American Games in Mexico City, Mexico (March 13 – April 22, 1955)
  - Gold Medal: Argentina
  - Silver Medal: Mexico
  - Bronze Medal: Netherlands Antilles

== Births ==
- January 10 — Franco Tancredi, Italian footballer and manager
- January 18 — Tibor Nyilasi, Hungarian international footballer
- January 28 — Aurel Munteanu, Romanian former footballer
- February 8 — Bruno Pezzey, Austrian international footballer (died 1994)
- February 15 — Ordan Aguirre, Venezuelan international footballer
- March 6 — Ray Tumbridge, English former professional footballer
- March 12 — Kirk Corbin, Barbadian former professional footballer
- March 13 — Bruno Conti, Italian international footballer
- April 1 — Roberto Pruzzo, Italian international footballer
- May 1 — Bobby Lenarduzzi, Canadian international soccer player
- June 21 — Michel Platini, French international footballer, 6th president of UEFA
- June 28 — Heribert Weber, Austrian international footballer
- July 25 — Milan Ružić, Yugoslavian international footballer (died 2014)
- August 8 — Herbert Prohaska, Austrian international footballer
- September 1 — Gerd Strack, German international footballer (died 2020)
- September 22 — Ludo Coeck, Belgian international footballer (died 1985)
- September 25 — Karl-Heinz Rummenigge, German international footballer
- October 11 — Hans-Peter Briegel, German international footballer
- October 12 — Einar Jan Aas, Norwegian international footballer
- November 24 — Joe Auguste, former Trinidadian footballer (died 2022)
- November 28 — Alessandro Altobelli, Italian international footballer
- December 24 — Cees Schapendonk, Dutch international footballer

== Deaths ==
=== January ===
- November 11 – Ramón Muttis, Argentine defender, runner-up of the 1930 FIFA World Cup. (55)
