= Weare (surname) =

Weare is a surname, and may refer to:

- Frank Weare (1896–1971), British World War I flying ace
- Jack Weare (1912–1994), Welsh footballer
- Joseph Weare (1737–1774), American Indian fighter
- Kate Weare (born 1972), American choreographer
- Katherine Weare (born 1950), Professor of Education at the University of Southampton, England
- Len Weare, Welsh professional footballer
- Meshech Weare (1713–1786), American farmer
- Neil Weare (born 1980), Guam middle-distance runner
- Ross Weare (born 1977), footballer
- Tony Weare (1912–1994), English comics artist
- William Weare, victim in the Radlett murder
