= John Bird =

John Bird may refer to:

== Politics ==
- John Bird (died c. 1445), MP for Marlborough
- John Bird (MP for Derby), in 1459, MP for Derby
- John Bird (MP for Bath) (by 1481–1542 or later), in 1529, MP for Bath
- John Bird (MP for Coventry) (c. 1694–1771), MP for Coventry from 1734 to 1737
- John James Bird (1844–1933), politician in Manitoba, Canada
- John Bird Wright (1909–1990), New Zealand diplomat
- John Bird (MEP) (1926–1997), one of the Members of the European Parliament 1989–94
- John Bird (New York politician) (1768–1806), American politician
- Bud Bird (John Williston Bird, born 1932), Canadian politician
- John T. Bird (1829–1911), American Democratic Party politician and businessman

== Sports ==
- John Bird (footballer, born 1940), Welsh football player for Newport County
- John Bird (footballer, born 1948), English football player and manager
- John Bird (racing driver) (born 1926), Canadian rally driver

== Others ==
- John Bird (actor) (1936–2022), British actor and comedian
- John Bird (astronomer) (1709–1776), British astronomer and instrument designer
- John Bird (bishop) (died 1558), British bishop of Chester
- John Bird, Baron Bird (born 1946), founder of The Big Issue
- John E. Bird (1862–1928), member of the Michigan Supreme Court, 1910–1928
- John Bird (artist) (1768–1829), Welsh landscape artist
- John Bird (scientist) (born 1955), Canadian engineer, set hang gliding record in 1982
- John M. Bird, commander of United States Seventh Fleet

== See also ==
- John Berde
- John Birt (disambiguation)
