= Tumbridge =

Tumbridge may refer to:

== People ==
- Mary Jane Tumbridge (born 1964), Bermudian equestrian
- Ray Tumbridge (1955–2009), English footballer

== Other uses ==
- Tumbridge & Co., stockbroker
