= Lilygreen =

Lilygreen is a surname. It may refer to:

- Chris Lilygreen (born 1965), Welsh footballer and football manager
- Jon Lilygreen (born 1987), Welsh singer, who along with the band The Islanders represented Cyprus in the Eurovision Song Contest 2010
- Lilygreen & Maguire, Welsh pop rock duo formed in 2011 made up of Jon Lilygreen and Jon Maguire
