= John Berde =

John Berde may refer to:

- John Berde (MP for Bath) (by 1481–1542 or later), English MP for Bath
- John Berde (MP for Hythe) (by 1471–1521/22), English MP for Hythe

== See also ==
- John Bird
- John Birt (disambiguation)
