= Jack Weare =

Welsh footballer

Personal information
- Full name: Arthur John Weare
- Date of birth: 21 September 1912
- Place of birth: Newport, Wales
- Date of death: 1994 (aged 81–82)
- Height: 5 ft 11 in (1.80 m)
- Position: Goalkeeper

Senior career*
Years	Team	Apps	(Gls)
1931–1933	Lovells Athletic		
1933–1936	Wolverhampton Wanderers	42	(0)
1936–1939	West Ham United	58	(0)
1945–1951	Bristol Rovers	141	(0)
1951	Barry Town	5	(0)
- * Club domestic league appearances and goals

Arthur John Weare (21 September 1912 – 1994), commonly known as Jack Weare, was a Welsh professional footballer who played as a goalkeeper in The Football League for Wolverhampton Wanderers, West Ham United, and Bristol Rovers.

== Career ==
Born in Newport, Monmouthshire, Weare started his career with local side Lovells Athletic. He joined Football League First Division club Wolverhampton Wanderers in May 1933, playing 42 times for Wolves before joining West Ham United in September 1936.

Weare played for West Ham for three seasons, making 35 Second Division appearances in 1936–37 and 23 in 1937–38, before losing his place to Herman Conway and then Harry Medhurst in 1938–39.

After the outbreak of the Second World War in 1939, Weare played as a guest for Bournemouth, Bristol Rovers, Hibernian and St Mirren, where he won the Summer Cup in 1942–43. The club had played a Greenock Morton side that included Stanley Matthews and Tommy Lawton in the semi-final of the competition. During the match, Weare was injured as St Mirren went 2–0 down, and he moved to a position on the left wing, with centre-half Willie Kelly filling in as makeshift goalkeeper. Weare kept a clean sheet in the final, as the Saints beat Rangers by a single goal. He served with the Royal Air Force and, during the conflict, became a qualified PT instructor and rose to the rank of sergeant. He spent the latter part of the war in India, where he was reunited with former Hammers teammate Charlie Walker (who had also played as a guest for St Mirren). Despite Weare being Welsh, the pair were selected to play for England against Scotland at Irwin Stadium in New Delhi.

Weare signed with Bristol Rovers full-time on the conclusion of hostilities in 1945. He spent six years with The Pirates, making 141 League appearances. He ended his career with Barry Town in 1951, for whom he played five times in the Southern League.

Following his retirement from football, he emigrated to South Africa, where he worked for a food processing company in Estcourt. In 1957, he moved to Salisbury, Rhodesia, and worked as a production manager until his retirement in 1987. He was living in the city, by then known as Harare, Zimbabwe, around the time of his death in 1994. His brother, Len, was also a footballer.
