= John Birt (disambiguation) =

John Birt (born 1944) is a British television executive and businessman.

John Birt may also refer to:

- John Birt (footballer) (born 1937), Australian rules footballer
- John Birt (politician) (1873–1925), Australian politician

== See also ==
- John Berde
- John Bird
