= Joe Auguste =

Trinidad and Tobago footballer

Personal information
- Full name: Joseph Auguste
- Date of birth: 24 November 1951
- Place of birth: Port of Spain, Trinidad and Tobago
- Date of death: 2022 (aged 70–71)
- Position: Forward

Youth career
- Blackpool

Senior career*
Years	Team	Apps	(Gls)
	Chelmsford City	0	(0)
- Hounslow
1979–1981	Hayes	55	(5)
1981–1983	Hounslow		
1983	Exeter City	10	(0)
- Hounslow
- Chiswick Albion
- * Club domestic league appearances and goals

Joseph Auguste (24 November 1951 – 11 February 2022) was a Trinidadian former footballer who played as a forward in the Football League for Exeter City.

== Career ==
Auguste began his career in the youth set-up at Blackpool, before joining Chelmsford City. He joined Hounslow FC in 1979 & then Hayes F.C., where he played 55 times. Auguste re-joined Hounslow in 1981, following his departure from Hayes. In September 1983, Auguste joined Football League club Exeter City on non-contract terms. Auguste made his debut for the club in a 2–0 loss against Bristol Rovers on 17 September 1983, going on to make 10 league appearances for the club. In November 1983, Auguste left Exeter, re-joining Hounslow in the process.

== Personal life ==
Following his football career, Joe raised 3 children, while working at Broadwater Primary School, Tooting, for 15 years as an Early Years Educator & sports mentor. He was a lifelong supporter of Liverpool FC, travelling domestically and abroad for matches. Joe also had a great passion for West Indies Cricket, playing himself in vetern leagues until his mid sixties.

In March 2022, Auguste's former club Chiswick Albion announced Auguste had died peacefully, in Nottingham. He leaves behind his beloved children - daughter, Maria '81 (grandchildren - Evelyn '04 & Arran '06) and 2 sons, Paul '84 & Adam '87.
