= Steve Holbrook =

English footballer

Personal information
- Full name: Stephen Holbrook
- Date of birth: 16 September 1952
- Place of birth: Richmond, England
- Position: Right wing

Youth career
- –: Hull City

Senior career*
Years	Team	Apps	(Gls)
1970–1972	Hull City	3	(0)
1972–1977	Darlington	116	(12)
1977–1983	Gateshead		
- * Club domestic league appearances and goals

Stephen Holbrook (born 16 September 1952) is an English former footballer who made 119 appearances in the Football League for Hull City and Darlington in the 1970s. He played on the right wing. He went on to play non-league football for Gateshead.

== Life and career ==
Holbrook was born in Richmond, Yorkshire, where he attended Richmond Secondary Modern School. He was capped several times for England Schoolboys. He scored the winning goal against their Welsh counterparts, and the Times gave him a glowing report, albeit in a losing cause, against the German Schoolboys at Wembley in April 1968:

Stephen Holbrook gave an outstanding display for England Schoolboys, and looked a player of huge promise. ... Holbrook has skill and strength far beyond his 15 years. With no apparent weakness in either foot, immaculate timing and a sense of the smallest gap, he kept the German defence in constant anxiety.

He began his football career as an apprentice with Hull City, and made his first-team debut for the club on 7 November 1970, in a 2–0 home defeat to Luton Town in the Second Division. After playing just twice more over the next 18 months, he moved on to Fourth Division club Darlington. Over five seasons with Darlington, he played 131 matches in all competitions and scored 13 goals, all but one in the league. That goal came in the 1975–76 League Cup against Sheffield Wednesday, newly relegated from the Second Division. Darlington had lost the home leg 2–0, but in the second leg, at Wednesday's Hillsborough ground, Holbrook opened the scoring in the second half, the match ended 2–2, and Darlington won the replay and went on to reach the last 32 of the competition. Speaking 25 years later, he described the goal as "An absolute pearler. I wouldn't care, I was whinging to the referee because someone was pulling me back and he just said 'There's the ball' and I hit it. Afterwards we were running back and the ref asked me if I was satisfied. After winning at Hillsborough, I think I probably was."

Holbrook made a transfer request in 1977, left the club and signed with Gateshead, playing in the Northern Premier League. He scored 34 goals from 156 appearances in senior competition for Gateshead over six seasons, in the last of which they won the Northern Premier League title.

Holbrook's employment after retiring from football included operating a car hire company in Darlington.
