= Kirk Corbin =

Barbadian footballer (1955–2025)

Personal information
- Full name: Kirk DeVere Corbin
- Date of birth: 12 March 1955
- Place of birth: Barbados
- Date of death: 21 July 2025 (aged 70)
- Position: Right-back

Senior career*
Years	Team	Apps	(Gls)
1978–1979	Wokingham Town		
1978–1979	Cambridge United	3	(0)
1979–1980	Wokingham Town		
1986–1988	Wycombe Wanderers	50	(0)
- Wokingham Town
- * Club domestic league appearances and goals

Kirk DeVere Corbin (12 March 1955 – 21 July 2025) was a Barbadian professional footballer who played in the Football League as a right-back for Cambridge United, and in the Isthmian League and Football Conference for Wycombe Wanderers. Corbin died on 21 July 2025, at the age of 70.
