= Ordan Aguirre =

Venezuelan footballer (born 1955)

Ordan Ramón Aguirre (born February 15, 1955) is a retired Venezuelan football (soccer) player. He competed at the 1980 Summer Olympics in Moscow, Soviet Union, where the Venezuela national football team was eliminated after the preliminary round. Aguirre played for Deportivo Lara. He was also part of Venezuela's squad for the 1979 Copa América tournament.
