= Kim Wassell =

English footballer

Personal information
- Date of birth: 9 June 1957 (age 69)
- Place of birth: Wolverhampton, England
- Position: Defender

Youth career
- –1975: West Bromwich Albion

Senior career*
Years	Team	Apps	(Gls)
1976–1977	West Bromwich	0	(0)
1977–1978	Worcester	0	(0)
1978–1979	Northampton	20	(0)
1979–1980	Aldershot	0	(0)
1981	Doveton SC	10	(0)
1983–1984	Hull	1	(0)
1984–1985	Swansea	2	(5)
1985	VPS Vaasa	6	(0)
1985–1986	Wolverhampton	2	(0)
1985–1986	Gresley	1	(0)
1989–1990	Shrewsbury	2	(0)
1989–1990	Worcester	0	(0)
1990	BK-46		(4)
1992	Gnistan		(1)
1992	Wivenhoe Town	1	(0)
1993	PK-35		(3)
1995	HJK Helsinki	1	(0)
- * Club domestic league appearances and goals

Kim Wassell (born 9 June 1957) is an English former footballer. He played for several clubs in the Football League Third and Fourth Divisions as well as in Australia and Finland. Wassell capped once for HJK Helsinki in the Finnish premier division Veikkausliiga.

In 2002 Wassell was charged of murdering his ex-girlfriend but was found not guilty.
