= Len Staples =

English footballer

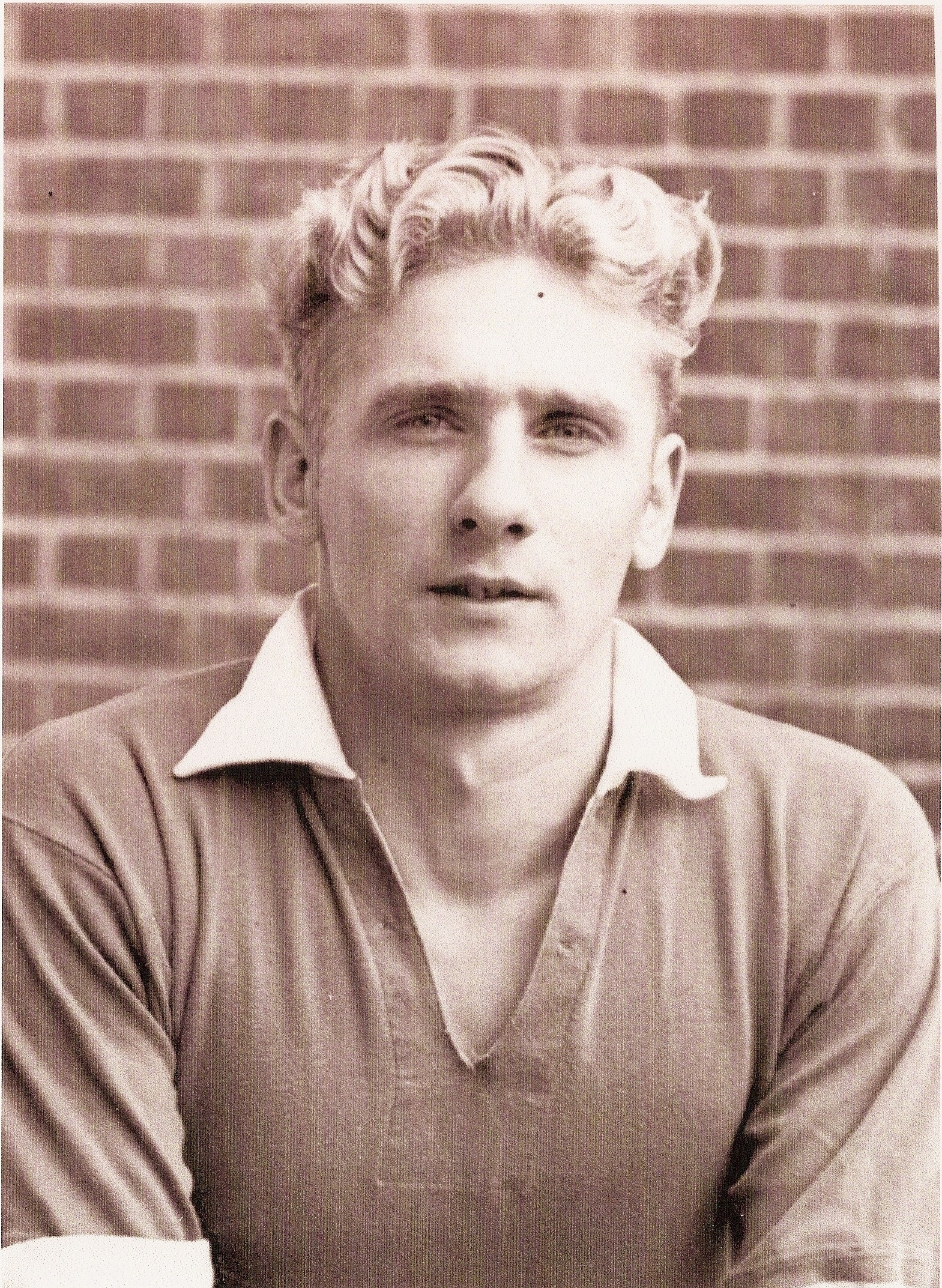
- Staples at Leicester City, circa 1943.

Personal information
- Full name: Leonard Ernest Staples
- Date of birth: 23 January 1926
- Place of birth: Leicester, England
- Date of death: 2 September 2008
- Position: Full back

Senior career*
Years	Team	Apps	(Gls)
1943	Leicester City	5	(1)
1947	Torquay United	0	(0)
1947–1949	Leicester City	0	(0)
1949–1957	Newport County	164	(2)
1957–1958	Weymouth	20	(0)
1958–1959	Nuneaton Borough	11	(0)

International career
1940	England Schoolboys	1	(0)
- * Club domestic league appearances and goals

Leonard Ernest Staples (23 January 1926 – 2 September 2008) was an English professional footballer. A full back, he started his career at Leicester City and in 1949 joined Newport County. He went on to make 164 appearances for the club, scoring 2 goals, between 1949 and 1957.

== Life and playing career ==
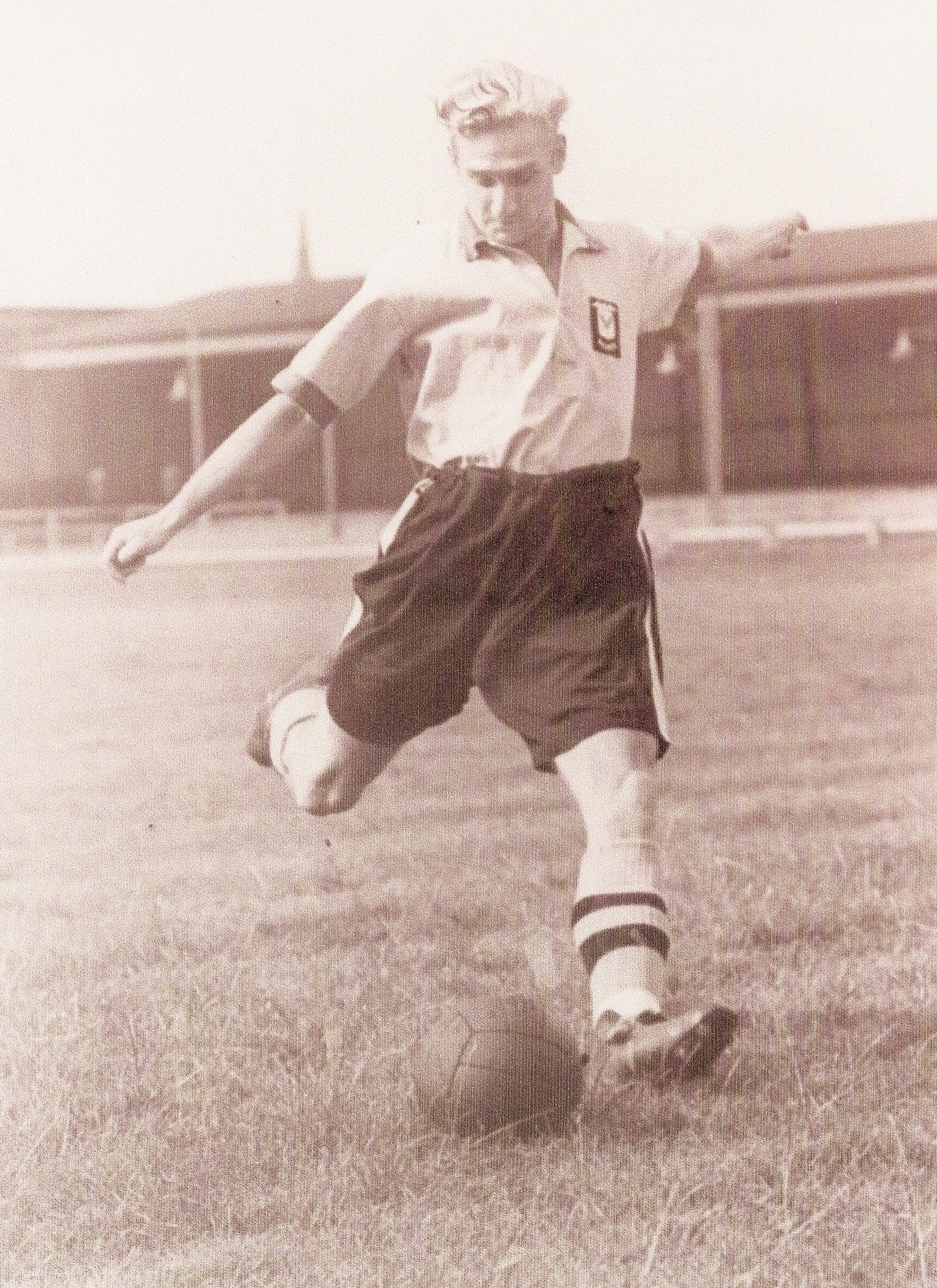
Staples at Newport County

Born in Leicester, England, in 1926, Staples played in the successful Linwood Lane School first XI of 1938/9, which won the City Schools League and the County Cup. He went on to captain Leicestershire Schoolboys and in March 1940 was capped for England Schoolboys against Wales at Ninian Park.

In 1940 Staples signed for Leicester City, playing for the Juniors in the 1940/1 season (winning the league) and the Colts in the 1941/2 and 1942/3 seasons. Staples made his debut for Leicester City's senior side aged 17 in the final game of the 1942/3 season, an away game at Stoke City for which Leicester arrived with only 8 players. The match was delayed until a full team could be fielded, with two Stoke players who were on Service leave and a Port Vale player being drafted in to complete the Leicester team. In the early months of the following season (1943/4) Staples appeared more regularly for the senior Leicester City side, making a further 4 appearances and scoring 1 goal.

World War II interrupted Staples' career when he joined the Royal Navy in December 1943, shortly before his 18th birthday. He served at HMS Raleigh (shore establishment) and on HMS St James (D65), based in Malta, and played football for his ship and for the Mediterranean Fleet side.

Staples was demobilised in June 1947 and immediately signed for Torquay United, although he never made an appearance for the club. By the time the new season began in August, he had returned to Leicester, re-signed for Leicester City (then in the old Division 2), and was married to Edna Lay in September 1947. In the 1947/8 and 1948/9 seasons Staples played for the Leicester City reserves side, although he failed to break into the first team. At the end of the 1948/9 season he asked to be placed on the transfer list and was signed by Newport County, then managed by Tom Bromilow who had previously been Staples' manager at Leicester.

Staples stayed with Newport County until 1957, making 164 appearances and scoring two goals in the (old) English Division 3 South. After leaving Newport Staples moved to Weymouth FC for a season, following which he returned to live in Leicester, playing for Nuneaton Borough FC until his retirement from the game at the end of the 1958/9 season.
