= Harry Medhurst =

English footballer (1916–1984)

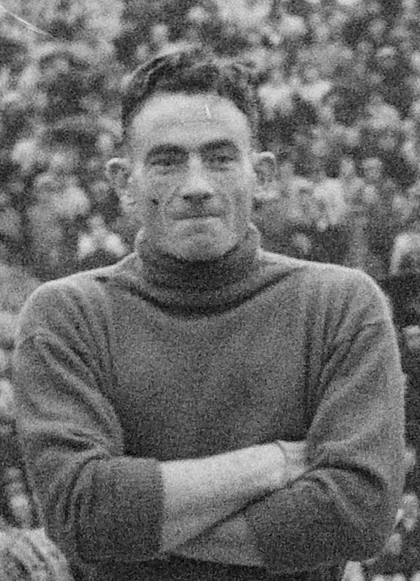
- Medhurst in a Chelsea team photo, November 1947

Personal information
- Full name: Harry Edward Pafford Medhurst
- Date of birth: 5 February 1916
- Place of birth: Byfleet, England
- Date of death: 9 April 1984 (aged 68)
- Place of death: Woking, England
- Position: Goalkeeper

Senior career*
Years	Team	Apps	(Gls)
19??–38	Woking		(0)
1938–46	West Ham United	27	(0)
1946–52	Chelsea	143	(0)
1952–53	Brighton	12	(0)
- * Club domestic league appearances and goals

Henry Edward Pafford Medhurst (5 February 1916 – April 1984) was a footballer who played for Woking, West Ham United, Chelsea and Brighton as a goalkeeper.

== Football career ==
Medhurst began his career with Woking. He moved to West Ham in 1938 but managed only 29 games before September 1939 and the outbreak of war. His footballing career was interrupted by World War II in which he served in the British Army as a sergeant. During the war, he guested for Sheffield Wednesday.

On commencement of League football in 1946 Medhurst played only three more times for the Hammers and in 1946 he left West Ham and signed for Chelsea in exchange for Joe Payne. He played 157 games for Chelsea in all competitions. He left Chelsea in 1952 and played a single season with Brighton before returning to Stamford Bridge as assistant trainer, physiotherapist and trainer until his retirement in 1975. He was awarded a testimonial match which was played in March 1976 between Chelsea and West Ham.

== Cricket career ==
Medhurst was also a keen cricketer playing as a right-handed batsman for Cambridgeshire in the Minor Counties Championship from 1950 until 1953.

== Death ==
He died in Woking, Surrey in April 1984 aged 68.
