= Geoff Bray =

English footballer (born 1951)

Personal information
- Date of birth: 30 May 1951 (age 75)
- Place of birth: Chatham, England
- Position: Forward

Senior career*
Years	Team	Apps	(Gls)
–	Erith & Belvedere		
1972–1975	Oxford United	33	(6)
1975–1977	Swansea City	46	(20)
1976–1977	Torquay United	7	(2)
–	Dartford		
- * Club domestic league appearances and goals

Geoff Bray (born 30 May 1951) is an English former footballer who played in the Football League for Oxford United, Swansea City and Torquay United.
