= Tumbridge & Co. =

Tumbridge & Co. was a stockbroker. It was one of the earliest brokerage firms that specialized in the trade of options. The firm was headquartered at 39 Wall Street.

In 1875, the company published a 48-page booklet titled Secrets of Success in Wall Street, which aimed to educate and attract investors to trade options. It described the workings of the New York Stock Exchange and the over-the-counter options market.

The options traded at Tumbridge & Co. were American options, which went by the name "stock privileges". Equity options included both call options and put options. Option strategies included option spreads and straddles. Each option contract represented 100 shares of an underlying stock, and matured in 30 days. Tumbridge always charged $100 as cost of a call or a put and $6.25 for broker's commissions for each leg of the trade.
