= John Gilligan (footballer, born 1957) =

English footballer

Personal information
- Full name: John Joseph Gilligan
- Date of birth: 2 May 1957 (age 69)
- Place of birth: Abingdon, England
- Position: Midfielder

Youth career
- Swindon Town

Senior career*
Years	Team	Apps	(Gls)
1975–1977	Swindon Town	6	(0)
1976	→ Huddersfield Town (loan)	1	(0)
1977	→ Northampton Town (loan)	5	(1)
–	Sligo Rovers		
- * Club domestic league appearances and goals

John Gilligan (2 May 1957 – 18 May 2023) was an English professional footballer who played as a midfielder in the English Football League for Swindon Town, Huddersfield Town and Northampton Town, and in Ireland for Sligo Rovers.
