= John Rowland (footballer, born 1936) =

Welsh footballer

Personal information
- Date of birth: 16 March 1936
- Place of birth: Newport, Wales
- Date of death: 2002 (aged 65–66)
- Position: Central defender

Youth career
- Lovells Athletic

Senior career*
Years	Team	Apps	(Gls)
1958–1969	Newport County	462	(11)
- Merthyr Tydfil

Managerial career
- Merthyr Tydfil
- * Club domestic league appearances and goals

John Rowland (1936–2002) was a Welsh professional footballer. Rowland joined Newport County in 1958 from local club Lovells Athletic. He went on to make 463 appearances for Newport scoring 9 goals. In 1969, he joined Merthyr Tydfil as player/manager.
