= John Bird (MP for Bath) =

16th-century English politician

John Bird or Berde (by 1481–1542 or later), of Bath, Somerset, was an English politician.

He was a member (MP) of the parliament of England for Bath in 1529.
