= Alan Mayes =

English footballer

Personal information
- Full name: Alan Kenneth Mayes
- Date of birth: 11 December 1953 (age 72)
- Place of birth: Edmonton, London, England
- Height: 5 ft 7 in (1.70 m)
- Position: Striker

Senior career*
| Years | Team | Apps | (Gls) |
| 1971–1974 | Queens Park Rangers | 0 | (0) |
| 1974–1979 | Watford | 133 | (31) |
| 1975–1976 | → Northampton Town (loan) | 10 | (4) |
| 1979–1980 | Swindon Town | 89 | (38) |
| 1980–1983 | Chelsea | 66 | (19) |
| 1983–1985 | Swindon Town | 62 | (27) |
| 1985–1986 | Carlisle United | 10 | (2) |
| 1985–1986 | → Newport County (loan) | 3 | (1) |
| 1986–1987 | Blackpool | 13 | (6) |
- * Club domestic league appearances and goals

Alan Kenneth Mayes (born 11 December 1953) is an English retired footballer who made nearly 400 appearances in the Football League during the 1970s and 1980s.

A striker, Mayes started out with Queens Park Rangers and played for Watford, Northampton Town, Swindon Town, Chelsea, Carlisle United, Newport County, Blackpool and Wycombe Wanderers.
