= Steve Bryant (footballer) =

English footballer

Personal information
- Full name: Steven Paul Bryant
- Date of birth: 5 September 1953
- Place of birth: London, England
- Height: 5 ft 8 in (1.73 m)
- Positions: Winger; left back

Youth career
- 1970–1971: Birmingham City

Senior career*
Years	Team	Apps	(Gls)
1971–1976	Birmingham City	36	(1)
1976	→ Sheffield Wednesday (loan)	3	(1)
1976–1979	Northampton Town	97	(5)
1979–1982	Portsmouth	111	(5)
1982	Northampton Town	10	(0)
1984–1986	Canberra City	68	(11)
Total		325	(23)
- * Club domestic league appearances and goals

Steven Paul Bryant (born 5 September 1953) is an English former professional footballer born in Islington, London, who played as a winger or left back.

He made more than 250 appearances in the Football League playing for Birmingham City, Sheffield Wednesday (on loan), Northampton Town (in two spells) and Portsmouth, before moving to Australia, where he played for Canberra City in the National Soccer League. He won Northampton Town's Player of the Year award in 1978.
