= Ray Wilcox =

Welsh footballer

Personal information
- Full name: Raymond Wilcox
- Date of birth: 12 April 1921
- Place of birth: Treharris, Wales
- Date of death: 26 January 2003 (aged 81)
- Place of death: Newport, Wales
- Position: Defender

Senior career*
Years	Team	Apps	(Gls)
- Treharris Athletic
1939–1969	Newport County	487	(0)
- * Club domestic league appearances and goals

Raymond Wilcox (12 April 1921 – 26 January 2003) was a Welsh professional footballer who played as a centre half.

== Career ==
Born in Treharris, Glamorgan, Wilcox joined Second Division side Newport County from Treharris Athletic in 1939. He remained at the club for over 30 years, making over 500 appearances in all competitions without scoring. He captained Newport as they reached the fifth round of the FA Cup in the 1948–49 season, the furthest they have ever progressed in the competition. Wilcox was rewarded with a testimonial in 1959, which featured Stanley Matthews. Following his retirement, Wilcox remained at Newport as trainer.

== Personal life ==
During World War II, Wilcox worked as a PE instructor for the Royal Air Force at St Andrew's golf course in Scotland.

Wilcox suffered from Alzheimer's disease for the last six years of his life. He died in hospital in Newport of a perforated ulcer on 26 January 2003, aged 81. He was survived by his second wife, Margaret, and his son from his first marriage.
