= Colin Gardner =

English football official and philanthropist

- Born: 1940 or 1941; England
- Died: 3 July 2010 (aged 69); Minchinhampton, England

Domestic
Years	League	Role

Colin Gardner MBE (1940 or 1941 – 3 July 2010) was an English football official and philanthropist.

== Career ==
Gardner began his career as a referee in the Football League. He then became chairman of a number of non-league teams, including Minehead, Gloucester City and Forest Green Rovers.

=== Recognition ===
Gardner was awarded a MBE in 2006 for his charity work.

== Death ==
Gardner died of a brain tumour on 3 July 2010, at the age of 69, at his home in Minchinhampton.
