= Dave Williams (footballer, born 1942) =

Welsh footballer

Personal information
- Full name: David Williams
- Date of birth: 1 March 1942
- Place of birth: Newport, Wales
- Date of death: 23 February 2015 (aged 72)
- Position: Right back

Youth career
- Nash United

Senior career*
Years	Team	Apps	(Gls)
1960–1973	Newport County	306	(2)

Managerial career
- 1988: Newport County
- * Club domestic league appearances and goals

David Williams (1 March 1942 – 23 February 2015) was a Welsh professional footballer and coach. A full back, he joined Newport County from local club Nash United. He went on to make 306 league appearances for Newport scoring 2 goals between 1960 and 1973.

In 1988 Williams had a brief spell as team manager of Newport County until the arrival of Eddie May.

In September 2009 Williams was inducted to the Newport County Hall of Fame. He died at the age of 72 in 2015.
