= Len Weare =

Welsh footballer

Personal information
- Full name: Leonard Nicholas Weare
- Date of birth: 23 July 1934
- Place of birth: Newport, Wales
- Date of death: 21 September 2012 (aged 78)
- Position: Goalkeeper

Youth career
- Temple Street YMCA

Senior career*
Years	Team	Apps	(Gls)
1955–1970	Newport County	525	(0)
- * Club domestic league appearances and goals

Leonard Nicholas Weare (23 July 1934 – 21 September 2012) was a Welsh professional footballer who played as a goalkeeper. He has the distinction of being one of a relatively small group of British footballers to play 500 English Football League matches for one club, the only other Welshmen being Ryan Giggs, Neville Southall and Roger Freestone.

Weare holds the record for the most football league appearances for Newport County with 525 from 1955 to his retirement as a player in 1970. In all competitions Weare made over 600 appearances for Newport County, his only club. Weare was selected for Wales international squads but never attained a full cap.

Weare died on 21 September 2012. He was 78 years old. A minute's applause was held in his honour at Newport County's match versus Southport on 22 September 2012. He was entered into the Newport County Hall of Fame as part of the Centenary Celebrations at Newport's Celtic Manor Resort. He died weeks before the event but knew about the plans. His family received the award on his behalf.

His brother, Jack, was also a footballer.
