= Robin Wainwright =

English footballer (born 1951)

Personal information
- Full name: Robin Keith Wainwright
- Date of birth: 9 March 1951 (age 75)
- Place of birth: Luton, England
- Height: 5 ft 11 in (1.80 m)
- Position: Midfielder

Senior career*
Years	Team	Apps	(Gls)
1971–1972	Luton Town	16	(3)
1970–1971	→ Cambridge United (loan)	1	(0)
1973	Millwall	4	(0)
1973–1975	Northampton Town	32	(5)
- * Club domestic league appearances and goals

Robin Wainwright (born 9 March 1951) is an English former footballer who played in the Football League for Cambridge United, Luton Town, Millwall and Northampton Town.
