= Gary Mabee =

English footballer

Personal information
- Full name: Gary Lee Mabee
- Date of birth: 1 February 1955 (age 71)
- Place of birth: Oxford, England

Senior career*
Years	Team	Apps	(Gls)
1970–1974	Tottenham Hotspur		
1974–1976	Northampton Town	33	(13)
- * Club domestic league appearances and goals

Gary Lee Mabee (born 1 February 1955) is an English former professional footballer who played as a forward. He began his career with Tottenham Hotspur, as an apprentice, in July 1970. After a very brief loan spell at AJ Auxerre, he moved to Northampton Town, in the summer of 1974, when Tottenham did not extend his contract.

In his short professional career at Northampton, Mabee started 29 games and came on as substitute in four. He scored 13 goals in his first season with Northampton.

Mabee grew up in Oxford.
