= Peter Passey =

English footballer

Personal information
- Full name: Peter Thord John Passey
- Date of birth: 13 July 1952 (age 74)
- Place of birth: Birmingham, England
- Position: Defender

Youth career
- Birmingham City

Senior career*
| Years | Team | Apps | (Gls) |
| 1969–1972 | Birmingham City | 0 | (0) |
| 1972 | → Newport County (loan) | 20 | (0) |
| 1972–1976 | Newport County | 136 | (2) |
| 1976–19?? | Bridgend Town | | |
- * Club domestic league appearances and goals

Peter Thord John Passey (born 13 July 1952) is an English former professional footballer. A defender, he represented England youth as they attempted to qualify for the 1970 UEFA European Under-18 Championship. He began his club career as an apprentice with Birmingham City, but never played for their first team. In the 1971–72 Football League season, he played 20 matches on loan at Newport County, joined the club on a permanent basis in December 1972, and went on to make 136 league appearances, scoring twice. In 1976, he joined Bridgend Town.
