= George Reilly =

Scottish footballer

Personal information
- Date of birth: 14 September 1957 (age 69)

Senior career*
Years	Team	Apps	(Gls)
1976–1979	Northampton Town	127	(46)
1979–1983	Cambridge United	138	(36)
1983–1985	Watford	46	(14)
1985–1985	Newcastle United	31	(10)
1985–1988	West Bromwich Albion	43	(9)
1988	Cambridge United	20	(7)
1989	Barnet	27	(5)
Total		432	(127)
- * Club domestic league appearances and goals

George Reilly (born 14 September 1957) is a Scottish former footballer. He played for Corby Town, Northampton Town, Cambridge United, Watford, Newcastle United, West Bromwich Albion and Barnet. Reilly scored the winning goal for Watford against Plymouth Argyle in the 1984 FA Cup semi-final at Villa Park and played in the 1984 FA Cup Final itself. In 2003, nearly 20 years later, Reilly was working as a bricklayer on a building site in Corby when he was attacked by another worker who bit part of his right ear off, before whispering "Plymouth" in his other ear by way of explanation.

== Honours ==
Watford

- FA Cup runner-up: 1983–84
