= John Bird (footballer, born 1940) =

Welsh footballer (born 1940)

Personal information
- Full name: John Bird
- Date of birth: 21 November 1940 (age 85)
- Place of birth: Cardiff, Wales
- Position: Left-back

Senior career*
Years	Team	Apps	(Gls)
1957–1967	Newport County	277	(4)
1967–1968	Swansea Town	8	(0)
- Hereford United
Total		285	(4)
- * Club domestic league appearances and goals

John Bird (born 21 November 1940) is a Welsh former professional footballer. A full back, he joined Newport County in 1957. He went on to make 277 appearances for Newport, scoring 4 goals. In 1967, he joined Swansea Town.

Bird subsequently played with Merthyr Tydfil, Caerau and was player-manager at Pontyclun.
