= Howard Goddard =

English footballer

Personal information
- Full name: Howard John Goddard
- Date of birth: 10 May 1957 (age 69)
- Place of birth: Over Wallop, England
- Height: 5 ft 9 in (1.75 m)
- Position: Forward

Senior career*
Years	Team	Apps	(Gls)
1972–1976	Bournemouth	64	(18)
1976–1977	Swindon Town	12	(0)
1977–1982	Newport County	105	(42)
1982	→ Blackpool (loan)	4	(2)
1982	Bournemouth	9	(2)
1982–1983	Aldershot	28	(9)
- Trowbridge Town
Total		222	(73)
- * Club domestic league appearances and goals

Howard John Goddard (born 10 May 1957) is an English former professional footballer. A striker, he joined Newport County in 1977 from Swindon Town. He went on to make 105 appearances for Newport scoring 42 goals. In 1982, he spent time on loan at Blackpool, scoring twice in four matches before joining Bournemouth.
