= Ray Tumbridge =

English footballer (1955–2009)

Personal information
- Full name: Raymond Alan Tumbridge
- Date of birth: 6 March 1955 (age 71)
- Place of birth: Hampstead, England
- Date of death: 4 June 2009 (aged 54)
- Place of death: Chatham, England
- Position: Left back

Senior career*
Years	Team	Apps	(Gls)
1972–1974	Charlton Athletic	46	(0)
1974–1975	Folkestone	?	(?)
1975	Northampton Town	11	(0)
1976–1978	Weymouth	?	(3)
1978–1982	Dartford	?	(?)
1983–1988	Gravesend & Northfleet	?	(?)
1988–1989	Thanet United	?	(?)
1989–1991	Tonbridge	?	(?)
- * Club domestic league appearances and goals

Raymond Alan Tumbridge (6 March 1955 – 4 June 2009) was an English professional footballer who played in the Football League as a left back.
