= Chris Lilygreen =

Welsh footballer and manager

Personal information
- Full name: Christopher Lilygreen
- Date of birth: 9 June 1965 (age 61)
- Place of birth: Newport, Monmouthshire
- Position: Forward

Senior career*
Years	Team	Apps	(Gls)
1983–1985	Newport County	31	(4)
1985–1986	Yeovil Town	5	(2)
1986–1988	Bath City	42	(10)
1989–1994	Newport County	145	(68)
1994–1995	Ebbw Vale	21	(3)
1994–1995	Cwmbran Town	6	(0)

Managerial career
- 2002–2006: Caldicot Town
- 2006–: Chepstow Town
- * Club domestic league appearances and goals

Chris Lilygreen (born 9 June 1965) is a Welsh football manager and former professional footballer. A striker, he joined hometown team Newport County in 1983.

Lilygreen is Newport County AFC's leading all time goalscorer with 93 league and cup goals since the club was reformed in 1989.
