= Jeff Parton =

Welsh footballer

Personal information
- Full name: Jeffrey John Parton
- Date of birth: 24 February 1953 (age 73)
- Place of birth: Swansea, Wales
- Position: Goalkeeper

Senior career*
Years	Team	Apps	(Gls)
1970–1975	Burnley	3	(0)
1975–1978	Northampton Town	25	(0)
- Irthlingborough Diamonds

International career
	Wales U-23	3	(0)
- * Club domestic league appearances and goals

Jeffrey John "Jeff" Parton (born 24 February 1953) is a Welsh retired professional footballer who played as a goalkeeper. He won three caps for the Welsh under-23 team.
