= John Farrington (footballer) =

English footballer

Personal information
- Full name: John Robert Farrington
- Date of birth: 19 June 1947 (age 79)
- Place of birth: Lynemouth, England
- Height: 5 ft 10 in (1.78 m)
- Position: Right winger

Senior career*
Years	Team	Apps	(Gls)
1966–1969	Wolverhampton Wanderers	34	(2)
1969–1973	Leicester City	118	(19)
1973–1974	Cardiff City	23	(6)
1974–1980	Northampton Town	232	(29)
- AP Leamington
Total		407	(56)

Managerial career
- AP Leamington
- * Club domestic league appearances and goals

John Robert Farrington (born 19 June 1947) is an English former professional footballer who played as a right winger.

== Career ==
Born in Lynemouth, Farrington played for Wolverhampton Wanderers, Leicester City, Cardiff City and Northampton Town, making over 400 appearances in the Football League. He was part of the Leicester side that won the 1971 FA Charity Shield. He later became player-manager of AP Leamington.
