= Jim Hall (footballer, born 1945) =

English Footballer (born 1945)

Personal information
- Full name: James Leonard Hall
- Date of birth: 21 March 1945 (age 81)
- Place of birth: Northampton, England
- Position: Striker

Youth career
- Northampton ON Chenecks

Senior career*
Years	Team	Apps	(Gls)
1963–1967	Northampton Town	55	(7)
1967–1975	Peterborough United	302	(122)
1975–1978	Northampton Town	69	(28)
1976–1977	→ Cambridge United (loan)	24	(15)
Total		450	(172)

International career
	England Youth	1	(0)
- * Club domestic league appearances and goals

James Leonard Hall (born 21 March 1945) is an English former footballer who played as a forward.

Hall started his football career at Northampton ON Chenecks as a youth player gaining one cap for England Youth before he made 450 appearances in the Football League, including over 300 for Peterborough United. He scored 122 League goals for Peterborough between 1967 and 1975, and is their all-time leading League goalscorer.
