= Rod Jones (Welsh footballer) =

Welsh footballer

Personal information
- Date of birth: 14 June 1946 (age 80)
- Place of birth: Rhiwderin, Wales
- Date of death: May 4, 2022 (aged 75)
- Position: Forward

Youth career
- Lovells Athletic

Senior career*
Years	Team	Apps	(Gls)
1969–1979	Newport County	287	(67)
- Barry Town
- * Club domestic league appearances and goals

Rod "Roddy" Jones (14 June 1946 - 4 May 2022) was a Welsh former professional footballer. A striker, he joined Newport County in 1969 from local club Lovells Athletic. He went on to make 288 appearances for Newport scoring 65 goals. In 1979, he joined Barry Town.
