= Paul Stratford =

English footballer

Personal information
- Date of birth: 4 September 1955 (age 71)
- Place of birth: Northampton, England
- Position: Striker

Youth career
- Northampton Town

Senior career*
Years	Team	Apps	(Gls)
1972–1978	Northampton Town	172	(59)
Total		172	(59)
- * Club domestic league appearances and goals

Paul Stratford (born 4 September 1955) is an English former professional footballer who played as a striker. He spent his entire career with Northampton Town, scoring 59 goals in 172 appearances in the Football League.
