= Stuart Robertson (footballer, born 1946) =

English footballer

Personal information
- Full name: Stuart John Robertson
- Date of birth: 16 December 1946 (age 79)
- Place of birth: Nottingham, England
- Position: Centre half

Youth career
- 19??–1964: Nottingham Forest

Senior career*
Years	Team	Apps	(Gls)
1964–1966	Nottingham Forest	0	(0)
1966–1972	Doncaster Rovers	227	(8)
1972–1979	Northampton Town	254	(27)
1979–1980	Bedford Town	42	(3)
Total		523	(38)
- * Club domestic league appearances and goals

Stuart John Robertson (born 16 December 1946) is a former footballer who played centre half for Doncaster Rovers and Northampton Town.

== Club career ==
Robertson came through the ranks of Nottingham Forest Juniors, signing for the senior team in 1964 when he was 18.

=== Doncaster Rovers ===
After two season without a first team appearance, he moved to Third Division club Doncaster Rovers, his debut being in a 1–0 victory at Swindon Town on 1 October 1966. That first season he played 33 games, mainly at centre half but also filling in a variety of defensive positions, then in his second season he was the established centre half player appearing 47 times as Rovers finished mid table in the Fourth Division.

Robertson scored his first goal in a 7–0 home victory over Aldershot in February 1969, netting twice more that season as Doncaster won the league title. In his 5th season he played five games at centre forward, scoring twice in those games, as Doncaster struggled with having enough quality players and were eventually relegated.

=== Northampton Town ===
After the end of the 1971–72 season, Robertson moved to Northampton Town where he remained till the summer of 1979. He was voted Player of the Season for 1978–79.

=== Bedford Town ===
His next club was Bedford Town of the Southern League. He was released after the end of the 1979–80 season.

== Personal life ==
After football, Robertson managed a sports complex in Northampton.
