= Billy Best =

English footballer

Personal information
- Full name: William James Blaikley Best
- Date of birth: 7 September 1942 (age 84)
- Place of birth: Glasgow, Scotland
- Height: 5 ft 7 in (1.70 m)
- Position: Forward

Youth career
- Pollok

Senior career*
Years	Team	Apps	(Gls)
1961–1968	Northampton Town	47	(16)
1968–1973	Southend United	226	(106)
1973–1977	Northampton Town	184	(37)
1977	Bedford Town		
Total		457	(159)
- * Club domestic league appearances and goals

William James Blaikley Best (born 7 September 1942) is a former professional footballer who played football for Northampton Town and Southend United as a forward/winger. During his second spell with Northampton, he mainly performed in midfield and finally defence, as a centre back playing alongside the centre-half.

After retiring from football, Best worked as a painter before becoming a salesman. He was inducted into Northampton's hall of fame in 2006.

== Honours ==
Northampton Town

- Player of the Season: 1974-75; 1976-77
