= Barry Tucker =

Welsh footballer (born 1952)

Personal information
- Full name: William Barrington Tucker
- Date of birth: 28 August 1952 (age 74)
- Place of birth: Swansea, Wales
- Position: Full back

Youth career
- 1970–1971: Northampton Town

Senior career*
Years	Team	Apps	(Gls)
1971–1978	Northampton Town	214	(3)
1978–1982	Brentford	169	(5)
1982–1984	Northampton Town	63	(5)
Total		446	(13)
- * Club domestic league appearances and goals

William Barrington Tucker (born 28 May 1952) is a Welsh former professional footballer who made over 440 appearances as a full back in the Football League for Northampton Town and Brentford.

== Career ==
=== Northampton Town ===
A full back, Tucker began his career at Fourth Division club Northampton Town in 1970. After making his debut the following year, he went on to be a regular fixture in the team throughout the 1970s, making 214 league appearances and scoring three goals before departing the County Ground in February 1978. A memorable moment was helping the club to promotion to the Third Division during the 1975–76 season, though the Cobblers were relegated at the first attempt.

=== Brentford ===
Tucker followed his former Northampton Town manager Bill Dodgin, Jr. to Fourth Division club Brentford in February 1978 in a £10,000 deal. He went into the starting lineup at left back later that month and helped the Bees to promotion to the Third Division with a fourth-place finish at the end of the season. He missed only five league games over the course of the 1978–79 and 1979–80 seasons and despite missing most of 1980–81 due to a contractual dispute, he came back strong in 1981–82, making 38 league appearances and scoring four of the five goals he scored for the club. After his seventh appearance of the 1982–83 season, Tucker departed Griffin Park. He made 181 appearances and scored five goals in four-and-a-half years with Brentford.

=== Return to Northampton Town ===
Tucker returned to Northampton Town in October 1982, with the club still rooted in the Fourth Division. He made 63 league appearances and scored five goals before retiring from football in 1984. Tucker made 302 appearances and scored 8 goals across his two spells with the Cobblers.

== Personal life ==
After his retirement from football, Tucker settled in Northampton and as of November 2013 was working for FG Metcalfe.

== Career statistics ==
Appearances and goals by club, season and competition
Club	Season	League			FA Cup		League Cup		Total	
Club	Season	Division	Apps	Goals	Apps	Goals	Apps	Goals	Apps	Goals
Brentford	1977–78	Fourth Division	18	0	—		—		18	0
Brentford	1978–79	Third Division	43	0	1	0	2	0	46	0
Brentford	1979–80	Third Division	42	0	1	0	0	0	43	0
Brentford	1980–81	Third Division	23	1	1	0	0	0	24	1
Brentford	1981–82	Third Division	38	4	3	0	2	0	43	4
Brentford	1982–83	Third Division	5	0	—		2	0	7	0
Career total			169	5	6	0	6	0	181	5

== Honours ==
Northampton Town

- Football League Fourth Division second-place promotion: 1975–76

Brentford

- Football League Fourth Division fourth-place promotion: 1977–78
