= Derrick Christie =

English footballer

Personal information
- Full name: Derrick Hugh Michael Christie
- Date of birth: 15 March 1957 (age 69)
- Place of birth: Bletchley, England
- Height: 5 ft 8 in (1.73 m)
- Position: Winger

Senior career*
Years	Team	Apps	(Gls)
1975–1978	Northampton Town	138	(18)
1978–1984	Cambridge United	138	(19)
1984–1985	Reading	14	(1)
1985–1986	Cardiff City	19	(2)
1986–1986	Peterborough United	8	(0)
Total		317	(40)
- * Club domestic league appearances and goals

Derrick Hugh Michael Christie (born 15 March 1957) is an English former professional footballer who played as a winger. During his career, he made over 300 appearances in the Football League during spells with Northampton Town, Cambridge United, Reading, Cardiff City and Peterborough United.

== Career ==
Christie began his career with Northampton Town, helping the club win promotion to the Third Division during the 1975–76 season. He joined Cambridge United in 1978 for £50,000, making over 100 appearances for the club, before moving on to Reading in 1984. However, he struggled to establish himself in the first team and joined Cardiff City the following year. Despite initially impressing, he was eventually released at the end of the 1985-86 season and finished his professional career with Peterborough United.
