= 1969–70 Rochdale A.F.C. season =

English football club season

Rochdale
1969–70 season
- Manager: Len Richley; Dick Conner
- League Division Three: 9th
- FA Cup: 1st Round
- League Cup: 1st Round
- Top goalscorer: League: Reg Jenkins; All: Reg Jenkins

The 1969–70 season was Rochdale A.F.C.'s 63rd in existence and their first consecutive in the Football League Third Division, following promotion the previous season.

== Statistics ==
No.	Pos	Nat	Player	Total		Division 3		F.A. Cup		League Cup		Lancashire Cup		Rose Bowl	
No.	Pos	Nat	Player	Apps	Goals	Apps	Goals	Apps	Goals	Apps	Goals	Apps	Goals	Apps	Goals
	GK	(England) ENG	Chris Harker	49	0	46+0	0	1+0	0	1+0	0	0+0	0	1+0	0
	DF	(England) ENG	Graham Smith	50	0	46+0	0	1+0	0	1+0	0	1+0	0	1+0	0
	DF	(England) ENG	Derek Ryder	50	1	46+0	1	1+0	0	1+0	0	1+0	0	1+0	0
	MF	(England) ENG	Bobby Downes	32	4	26+4	4	0+1	0	0+0	0	0+0	0	0+1	0
	DF	(England) ENG	Colin Parry	50	0	46+0	0	1+0	0	1+0	0	1+0	0	1+0	0
	MF	(England) ENG	Joe Ashworth	48	1	44+0	1	1+0	0	1+0	0	1+0	0	1+0	0
	MF	(England) ENG	Norman Whitehead	46	2	41+1	1	1+0	1	1+0	0	1+0	0	1+0	0
	MF	(England) ENG	Billy Rudd	50	3	46+0	3	1+0	0	1+0	0	1+0	0	1+0	0
	FW	(England) ENG	Tony Buck	33	16	27+2	15	1+0	0	1+0	0	1+0	0	1+0	1
	FW	(England) ENG	Reg Jenkins	44	24	40+0	20	1+0	0	1+0	1	1+0	0	1+0	3
	MF	(England) ENG	Dennis Butler	48	13	44+0	10	1+0	0	1+0	2	1+0	0	1+0	1
	FW	(England) ENG	David Cross	16	3	10+6	3	0+0	0	0+0	0	0+0	0	0+0	0
	FW	(England) ENG	Steve Melledew	6	3	5+0	3	0+0	0	1+0	0	0+0	0	0+0	0
	MF	(England) ENG	Hughen Riley	24	4	20+4	4	0+0	0	0+0	0	0+0	0	0+0	0
	DF	(England) ENG	Vince Leech	15	1	13+0	1	1+0	0	0+0	0	1+0	0	0+0	0
	DF	(England) ENG	Paul Clarke	4	0	2+1	0	0+0	0	0+0	0	0+0	0	1+0	0
	DF	(Northern Ireland) NIR	Ronnie Blair	5	1	4+1	1	0+0	0	0+0	0	0+0	0	0+0	0
	GK	(England) ENG	Dave Tennant	1	0	0+0	0	0+0	0	0+0	0	1+0	0	0+0	0

== Final League Table ==
Pos	Team	Pld	W	D	L	GF	GA	GAv	Pts	Promotion or relegation
7	Barnsley	46	19	15	12	68	59	1.153	53	
8	Reading	46	21	11	14	87	77	1.130	53	Qualified for the Watney Cup (Note: The two teams who scored the most goals in each division, and did not qualify for Europe and were not promoted, qualified for the Watney Cup.)
9	Rochdale	46	18	10	18	69	60	1.150	46	
10	Bradford City	46	17	12	17	57	50	1.140	46	
11	Doncaster Rovers	46	17	12	17	52	54	0.963	46	

== Competitions ==
=== Football League Third Division ===
9 August 1969 1	Rochdale	0–3	Orient	Rochdale
		Report	Rofe 18'; Dyson 32'; Allen 52'	Stadium: Spotland Stadium; Attendance: 7114

16 August 1969 2	Stockport County	0–1	Rochdale	Stockport
		Report	Jenkins 40'	Stadium: Edgeley Park; Attendance: 5338

23 August 1969 3	Rochdale	3–3	Bury	Rochdale
	Melledew 10'; Jenkins 56', 89'	Report	Connell 17'; Parry 35'; Kerr 53' (pen.)	Stadium: Spotland Stadium; Attendance: 9752; Referee: JR Osborne

27 August 1969 4	Brighton & Hove Albion	2–0	Rochdale	Brighton and Hove
	Spearritt (pen.); Gilliver	Report		Stadium: Goldstone Ground; Attendance: 13904

30 August 1969 5	Walsall	1–4	Rochdale	Walsall
	Woodward 9'	Report	Jenkins 13' (pen.), 21'; Butler 43'; Melledew 86'	Stadium: Fellows Park; Attendance: 6666; Referee: RA Paine

6 September 1969 6	Rochdale	1–0	Barrow	Rochdale
	Melledew 13'	Report		Stadium: Spotland Stadium; Attendance: 6562

13 September 1969 7	Gillingham	2–2	Rochdale	Gillingham
	Yeo 48'; Pound 65'	Report	Buck 25', 79'	Stadium: Priestfield Stadium; Attendance: 4364

15 September 1969 8	Rochdale	4–2	Rotherham United	Rochdale
	Jenkins (pen.); Downes; Buck	Report	Storrie; Womble	Stadium: Spotland Stadium; Attendance: 6749

20 September 1969 9	Rochdale	1–2	Bradford City	Rochdale
	Jenkins 36'	Report	Middleton 13'; Corner 81'	Stadium: Spotland Stadium; Attendance: 9203

27 September 1969 10	Bristol Rovers	3–3	Rochdale	Bristol
	Jarman 11' (pen.); Stubbs 78'; Jones 81'	Report	Buck 16', 57', 90'	Stadium: Eastville Stadium; Attendance: 8673

29 September 1969 11	Bournemouth and Boscombe Athletic	0–3	Rochdale	Bournemouth
		Report	Leech; Jenkins (pen.) (pen.)	Stadium: Dean Court; Attendance: 4775

4 October 1969 12	Rochdale	3–0	Shrewsbury Town	Rochdale
	Buck 37'; Rudd 49'; Wood 58' (o.g.)	Report		Stadium: Spotland Stadium; Attendance: 6492

6 October 1969 13	Rochdale	2–0	Stockport County	Rochdale
	Jenkins; Butler	Report		Stadium: Spotland Stadium; Attendance: 7889

11 October 1969 14	Plymouth Argyle	2–3	Rochdale	Plymouth
	Shepherd 1'; Davey 49'	Report	Butler 2', 4'; Jenkins 79'	Stadium: Home Park; Attendance: 9458

18 October 1969 15	Rochdale	4–0	Tranmere Rovers	Rochdale
	Butler 1', 67'; Buck 20'; Jenkins 40'	Report		Stadium: Spotland Stadium; Attendance: 7892

25 October 1969 16	Southport	0–3	Rochdale	Southport
		Report	Dunleavy 23' (o.g.); Buck 79'; Jenkins 89'	Stadium: Haig Avenue; Attendance: 5834; Referee: HW Ellis

1 November 1969 17	Rochdale	3–2	Reading	Rochdale
	Butler 33'; Buck 41'; Ryder 64'	Report	Smee 3'; Jenkins 21'	Stadium: Spotland Stadium; Attendance: 7977; Referee: JE Thacker

3 November 1969 18	Mansfield Town	1–2	Rochdale	Mansfield
	Bates	Report	Jenkins (pen.); Butler	Stadium: Field Mill; Attendance: 4588

8 November 1969 19	Halifax Town	3–1	Rochdale	Halifax
	Lennard 23', 89'; Hill 85'	Report	Buck 50'	Stadium: The Shay; Attendance: 7570

22 November 1969 20	Luton Town	2–0	Rochdale	Luton
	Collins 75'; Allen 86'	Report		Stadium: Kenilworth Road; Attendance: 15876

24 November 1969 21	Rochdale	2–1	Mansfield Town	Rochdale
	Buck; Rudd	Report	Roberts	Stadium: Spotland Stadium; Attendance: 6833

29 November 1969 Abandoned	Rochdale	2–2	Fulham	Rochdale
	Goal		Goal	Stadium: Spotland Stadium; Attendance: 6861

6 December 1969 22	Bury	2–1	Rochdale	Bury
	Kerr 38', 82'	Report	Buck 82'	Stadium: Gigg Lane; Attendance: 9849

13 December 1969 23	Rochdale	0–0	Gillingham	Rochdale
		Report		Stadium: Spotland Stadium; Attendance: 5439; Referee: K Howley

20 December 1969 24	Barrow	2–0	Rochdale	Barrow-in-Furness
	Ledger 46', 62'	Report		Stadium: Holker Street; Attendance: 2128

10 January 1970 Abandoned	Bradford City	1–0	Rochdale	Bradford
	Goal			Stadium: Valley Parade

17 January 1970 25	Rochdale	0–0	Bristol Rovers	Rochdale
		Report		Stadium: Spotland Stadium; Attendance: 5701

23 January 1970 26	Doncaster Rovers	3–1	Rochdale	Doncaster
	Regan; Harker (o.g.); Briggs	Report	Jenkins	Stadium: Belle Vue; Attendance: 6237

26 January 1970 27	Rochdale	0–1	Bournemouth and Boscombe Athletic	Rochdale
		Report	MacDougall	Stadium: Spotland Stadium; Attendance: 5286

31 January 1970 28	Shrewsbury Town	1–0	Rochdale	Shrewsbury
	Harkin 48'	Report		Stadium: Gay Meadow; Attendance: 4091

4 February 1970 29	Bradford City	0–3	Rochdale	Bradford
		Report	Buck; Riley	Stadium: Valley Parade; Attendance: 10236

7 February 1970 30	Rochdale	2–1	Plymouth Argyle	Rochdale
	Cross 75'; Riley 87'	Report	Rickard 2'	Stadium: Spotland Stadium; Attendance: 4833

21 February 1970 31	Rochdale	1–1	Southport	Rochdale
	Ashworth 48'	Report	McCarthy 19'	Stadium: Spotland Stadium; Attendance: 4312

28 February 1970 32	Reading	1–0	Rochdale	Reading
	Chappell 25' (pen.)	Report	Riley (yellow card)	Stadium: Elm Park; Attendance: 14307

3 March 1970 33	Barnsley	1–0	Rochdale	Barnsley
	Evans	Report		Stadium: Oakwell; Attendance: 9548

9 March 1970 34	Rochdale	1–1	Torquay United	Rochdale
	Butler	Report	Welsh	Stadium: Spotland Stadium; Attendance: 3604

14 March 1970 35	Fulham	2–0	Rochdale	London
	Halom 18', 43'	Report		Stadium: Craven Cottage; Attendance: 6708

16 March 1970 36	Rochdale	2–0	Doncaster Rovers	Rochdale
	Cross; Riley	Report		Stadium: Spotland Stadium; Attendance: 4496

21 March 1970 37	Rochdale	1–1	Barnsley	Rochdale
	Cross 69'	Report	Hamstead 61'	Stadium: Spotland Stadium; Attendance: 4887

27 March 1970 38	Tranmere Rovers	0–0	Rochdale	Birkenhead
		Report		Stadium: Prenton Park; Attendance: 7192

28 March 1970 39	Torquay United	3–0	Rochdale	Torquay
	Lucas 10'; Mitchinson 14'; Welsh 34'	Report		Stadium: Plainmoor; Attendance: 5280

30 March 1970 40	Rochdale	5–0	Halifax Town	Rochdale
	Jenkins 24', 30', 47'; Whitehead 36'; Riley 51'	Report		Stadium: Spotland Stadium; Attendance: 5346

4 April 1970 41	Rochdale	2–1	Brighton & Hove Albion	Rochdale
	Butler 9'; Jenkins 89'	Report	Ashworth 50' (o.g.)	Stadium: Spotland Stadium; Attendance: 4762

9 April 1970 42	Rochdale	1–2	Walsall	Rochdale
	Rudd	Report	Woodward; Taylor	Stadium: Spotland Stadium; Attendance: 4404; Referee: H Williams

11 April 1970 43	Orient	2–2	Rochdale	London
	Brabrook 78'; Lazarus 87'	Report	Downes 30', 38'	Stadium: Brisbane Road; Attendance: 13260

14 April 1970 44	Rotherham United	3–1	Rochdale	Rotherham
	Leigh (pen.); Phillips	Report	Blair	Stadium: Millmoor; Attendance: 6382

18 April 1970 45	Rochdale	0–1	Fulham	Rochdale
		Report	Halom 22'	Stadium: Spotland Stadium; Attendance: 5077

25 April 1970 46	Rochdale	1–2	Luton Town	Rochdale
	Jenkins 37'	Report	Busby 15'; Macdonald 50'	Stadium: Spotland Stadium; Attendance: 5886; Referee: KH Burns

=== F.A. Cup ===
15 November 1969 1	Workington	2–1	Rochdale	Workington
	Goodfellow 59'; Martin 73'	Report	Whitehead 45'	Stadium: Borough Park; Attendance: 2570

=== League Cup ===
19 August 1969 1	Bolton Wanderers	6–3	Rochdale	Bolton
	Greaves; Byrom; Wharton	Report	Jenkins; Butler	Stadium: Burnden Park; Attendance: 10057; Referee: DJ Lyden

=== Lancashire Cup ===
24 September 1969	Burnley	2–0	Rochdale	Burnley
	Goal			Stadium: Turf Moor

=== Rose Bowl ===
26 July 1969	Rochdale	5–1	Oldham Athletic	Rochdale
	Jenkins; Butler; Buck		Goal	Stadium: Spotland Stadium
