= 1970–71 Rochdale A.F.C. season =

English football club season

Rochdale
1970–71 season
- Manager: Dick Conner
- League Division Three: 16th
- FA Cup: 4th Round
- League Cup: 2nd Round
- Top goalscorer: League: Reg Jenkins; All: Reg Jenkins

The 1970–71 season was Rochdale A.F.C.'s 64th in existence and their second consecutive in the Football League Third Division. The season also saw Rochdale win the Lancashire Cup for the first time since 1949.

== Statistics ==
No.	Pos	Nat	Player	Total		Division 3		F.A. Cup		League Cup		Lancashire Cup		Rose Bowl	
No.	Pos	Nat	Player	Apps	Goals	Apps	Goals	Apps	Goals	Apps	Goals	Apps	Goals	Apps	Goals
	GK	(England) ENG	Tony Godfrey	39	0	30+0	0	2+0	0	3+0	0	3+0	0	1+0	0
	DF	(England) ENG	Graham Smith	45	2	31+0	1	5+0	0	3+0	1	5+0	0	1+0	0
	DF	(England) ENG	Derek Ryder	60	0	44+0	0	5+0	0	3+0	0	7+0	0	1+0	0
	MF	(England) ENG	Hughen Riley	57	5	41+1	4	5+0	0	3+0	0	5+1	1	1+0	0
	DF	(England) ENG	Colin Parry	46	0	35+0	0	5+0	0	1+0	0	4+0	0	1+0	0
	MF	(England) ENG	Joe Ashworth	53	2	38+0	0	5+0	1	3+0	0	6+0	1	1+0	0
	MF	(England) ENG	Norman Whitehead	61	6	45+0	4	5+0	0	3+0	1	7+0	1	1+0	0
	FW	(England) ENG	Alf Arrowsmith	37	17	27+4	12	1+0	2	1+0	0	3+0	2	1+0	1
	FW	(England) ENG	Reg Jenkins	42	19	28+2	13	1+0	0	3+0	2	7+0	4	1+0	0
	MF	(Scotland) SCO	Peter Gowans	44	6	31+2	5	1+0	0	3+0	1	6+0	0	1+0	0
	MF	(England) ENG	Dennis Butler	39	10	29+1	8	3+0	1	1+0	0	3+1	1	1+0	0
	FW	(England) ENG	David Cross	44	13	30+3	9	4+1	1	2+1	0	2+0	2	0+1	1
	DF	(England) ENG	Paul Clarke	4	0	3+0	0	0+0	0	0+0	0	0+0	0	0+1	0
	DF	(Northern Ireland) NIR	Ronnie Blair	47	2	33+3	1	2+1	1	2+0	0	6+0	0	0+0	0
	MF	(England) ENG	Bobby Downes	49	1	35+2	0	5+0	1	2+0	0	5+0	0	0+0	0
	GK	(England) ENG	Dave Tennant	23	0	16+0	0	3+0	0	0+0	0	4+0	0	0+0	0
	DF	(Wales) WAL	Dave Pearson	4	0	3+0	0	0+0	0	0+0	0	1+0	0	0+0	0
	FW	(England) ENG	Tony Buck	12	3	4+3	1	3+0	2	0+0	0	2+0	0	0+0	0
	DF	(England) ENG	Vince Leech	4	0	3+1	0	0+0	0	0+0	0	0+0	0	0+0	0

== Final League Table ==
Pos	Team	Pld	W	D	L	GF	GA	GAv	Pts
14	Brighton & Hove Albion	46	14	16	16	50	47	1.064	44
15	Plymouth Argyle	46	12	19	15	63	63	1.000	43
16	Rochdale	46	14	15	17	61	68	0.897	43
17	Port Vale	46	15	12	19	52	59	0.881	42
18	Tranmere Rovers	46	10	22	14	45	55	0.818	42

Rules for classification: 1) Points; 2) Goal average; 3) Goals scored

== Competitions ==
=== Football League Third Division ===
15 August 1970 1	Rochdale	1–1	Bristol Rovers	Rochdale
	Butler 36'	Report	Jarman 60'	Stadium: Spotland Stadium; Attendance: 4628

22 August 1970 2	Port Vale	4–1	Rochdale	Stoke-on-Trent
	James 16'; Morris 26'; McLaren 27', 89'	Report	Jenkins 73' (pen.)	Stadium: Vale Park; Attendance: 6196

29 August 1970 3	Rochdale	0–0	Bradford City	Rochdale
		Report		Stadium: Spotland Stadium; Attendance: 5600

31 August 1970 4	Rochdale	1–0	Doncaster Rovers	Rochdale
	Robertson (o.g.)	Report		Stadium: Spotland Stadium; Attendance: 3551

4 September 1970 5	Torquay United	3–0	Rochdale	Torquay
	Welsh; Jackson	Report		Stadium: Plainmoor; Attendance: 6165

12 September 1970 6	Rochdale	1–2	Fulham	Rochdale
	Gowans 20'	Report	Barrett 9'; Conway 70'	Stadium: Spotland Stadium; Attendance: 4429

19 September 1970 7	Rotherham United	5–1	Rochdale	Rotherham
	Watson 13', 70', 82'; Fantham 29'; Brogden 77'	Report	Butler 34'	Stadium: Millmoor; Attendance: 6928

26 September 1970 8	Rochdale	1–2	Reading	Rochdale
	Jenkins 62'	Report	Cumming 41' (pen.); Williams 86'	Stadium: Spotland Stadium; Attendance: 3840

3 October 1970 9	Mansfield Town	3–2	Rochdale	Mansfield
	Stenson 34', 65'; Jones 89'	Report	Butler 75'; Jenkins 90'	Stadium: Field Mill; Attendance: 7038; Referee: BJ Homewood

10 October 1970 10	Rochdale	1–1	Aston Villa	Rochdale
	Jenkins 23'	Report	Lochhead 10'	Stadium: Spotland Stadium; Attendance: 7537

17 October 1970 11	Bristol Rovers	2–2	Rochdale	Bristol
	Stubbs 37'; Jones 45'	Report	Jenkins 81'; Sheppard 85' (o.g.)	Stadium: Eastville Stadium; Attendance: 11794; Referee: G Hartley

21 October 1970 12	Brighton & Hove Albion	1–1	Rochdale	Brighton and Hove
	O'Sullivan	Report	Arrowsmith	Stadium: Goldstone Ground; Attendance: 7551

24 October 1970 13	Rochdale	1–0	Barnsley	Rochdale
	Arrowsmith 36'	Report		Stadium: Spotland Stadium; Attendance: 5462; Referee: RB Lee

31 October 1970 14	Walsall	0–3	Rochdale	Walsall
		Report	Arrowsmith 17'; Butler 45'; Gowans 65'	Stadium: Fellows Park; Attendance: 4667; Referee: L Callaghan

2 November 1970 15	Rochdale	1–1	Plymouth Argyle	Rochdale
	Whitehead	Report	Rickard	Stadium: Spotland Stadium; Attendance: 5033

7 November 1970 16	Rochdale	4–1	Wrexham	Rochdale
	Smith 10'; Gowans 37'; Riley 78'; Arrowsmith 87'	Report	Griffiths	Stadium: Spotland Stadium; Attendance: 4591

10 November 1970 17	Rochdale	0–1	Gillingham	Rochdale
		Report	Watson	Stadium: Spotland Stadium; Attendance: 3291

14 November 1970 18	Preston North End	3–1	Rochdale	Preston
	Wilson 20'; Ham 40'; Lyall 87'	Report	Whitehead 49'	Stadium: Deepdale; Attendance: 13451

28 November 1970 19	Swansea Town	4–2	Rochdale	Swansea
	A. Williams 25' (pen.); Allchurch 40'; H. Williams 47'; Nurse 89'	Report	Cross 67'; Whitehead 80'	Stadium: Vetch Field; Attendance: 7178; Referee: KE Walker

5 December 1970 20	Rochdale	1–2	Shrewsbury Town	Rochdale
	Jenkins 83'	Report	Harkin 18'; Andrews 88'	Stadium: Spotland Stadium; Attendance: 3217; Referee: ME Washer

19 December 1970 21	Rochdale	0–3	Port Vale	Rochdale
		Report	James 7'; Summerscales 39'; Morris 75'	Stadium: Spotland Stadium; Attendance: 3619; Referee: TP Gill

26 December 1970 22	Halifax Town	1–4	Rochdale	Halifax
	Brierley 18'	Report	Butler 35', 63', 69'; Cross 37'	Stadium: The Shay; Attendance: 5584; Referee: A Bone

9 January 1971 23	Plymouth Argyle	2–2	Rochdale	Plymouth
	Davey 69'; Sullivan 90'	Report	Whitehead 48'; Buck 53'	Stadium: Home Park; Attendance: 6140

16 January 1971 24	Rochdale	3–3	Brighton & Hove Albion	Rochdale
	Riley 6', 23', 80'	Report	Wilkinson 4'; Gilliver 21', 40'	Stadium: Spotland Stadium; Attendance: 4938; Referee: RE Raby

30 January 1971 25	Rochdale	0–0	Swansea Town	Rochdale
		Report		Stadium: Spotland Stadium; Attendance: 3220

6 February 1971 26	Shrewsbury Town	0–2	Rochdale	Shrewsbury
		Report	Cross 1', 21'	Stadium: Gay Meadow; Attendance: 3759; Referee: R Capey

10 February 1971 27	Chesterfield	1–1	Rochdale	Chesterfield
	Cliff	Report	Arrowsmith	Stadium: Saltergate Recreation Ground; Attendance: 10466

13 February 1971 28	Rochdale	2–0	Chesterfield	Rochdale
	Gowans 26'; Arrowsmith 60'	Report		Stadium: Spotland Stadium; Attendance: 3750

20 February 1971 29	Gillingham	0–0	Rochdale	Gillingham
		Report		Stadium: Priestfield Stadium; Attendance: 3979; Referee: WS Castle

22 February 1971 30	Rochdale	2–0	Bury	Rochdale
	Arrowsmith	Report		Stadium: Spotland Stadium; Attendance: 9088

27 February 1971 31	Rochdale	2–0	Walsall	Rochdale
	Jenkins 30'; Arrowsmith 84'	Report		Stadium: Spotland Stadium; Attendance: 4369; Referee: K Howley

6 March 1971 32	Barnsley	2–2	Rochdale	Barnsley
	Lea 17', 51'	Report	Arrowsmith 67'; Gowans 89'	Stadium: Oakwell; Attendance: 4872

8 March 1971 33	Rochdale	0–0	Tranmere Rovers	Rochdale
		Report		Stadium: Spotland Stadium; Attendance: 4498; Referee: JE Thacker

13 March 1971 34	Rochdale	1–2	Preston North End	Rochdale
	Cross 89'	Report	Heppolette 18'; Ingram 57'	Stadium: Spotland Stadium; Attendance: 10345

16 March 1971 35	Bury	0–2	Rochdale	Bury
		Report	Blair; Arrowsmith	Stadium: Gigg Lane; Attendance: 8047

20 March 1971 36	Wrexham	3–1	Rochdale	Wrexham
	Provan 7', 56'; Kinsey 39'	Report	Jenkins 16'	Stadium: Racecourse Ground; Attendance: 4152; Referee: WB Johnson

27 March 1971 37	Rochdale	2–0	Tranmere Rovers	Rochdale
	Jenkins 44'; Cross 53'	Report		Stadium: Spotland Stadium; Attendance: 3704; Referee: RB Kirkpatrick

3 April 1971 38	Bradford City	3–0	Rochdale	Bradford
	Middleton 67', 69'; Bannister 88'	Report		Stadium: Valley Parade; Attendance: 4536

7 April 1971 39	Fulham	2–0	Rochdale	London
	Earle 53'; Conway 76' (pen.)	Report		Stadium: Craven Cottage; Attendance: 10054

10 April 1971 40	Rochdale	0–3	Halifax Town	Rochdale
		Report	Rhodes 27'; Lennard 34'; Atkins 42'	Stadium: Spotland Stadium; Attendance: 5756

12 April 1971 41	Rochdale	1–1	Mansfield Town	Rochdale
	Arrowsmith	Report	Roberts	Stadium: Spotland Stadium; Attendance: 3898

17 April 1971 42	Aston Villa	1–0	Rochdale	Aston
	Vowden 6'	Report		Stadium: Villa Park; Attendance: 18406; Referee: P Partridge

19 April 1971 43	Tranmere Rovers	0–2	Rochdale	Birkenhead
		Report	Jenkins 66', 73'	Stadium: Prenton Park; Attendance: 3357

24 April 1971 44	Rochdale	4–3	Rotherham United	Rochdale
	Cross 44'; Jenkins 63', 80' (pen.); Mielczarek 87' (o.g.)	Report	Blair 70' (o.g.); Gilbert 77'; Swift 89'	Stadium: Spotland Stadium; Attendance: 3561

27 April 1971 45	Doncaster Rovers	1–2	Rochdale	Doncaster
	Kitchen	Report	Butler; Cross	Stadium: Belle Vue; Attendance: 2884

1 May 1971 46	Reading	1–1	Rochdale	Reading
	Wagstaff 82'	Report	Cross 66'	Stadium: Elm Park; Attendance: 5746

=== F.A. Cup ===
21 November 1970 1	Rochdale	2–0	Oldham Athletic	Rochdale
	Arrowsmith 7', 50'	Report		Stadium: Spotland Stadium; Attendance: 13879; Referee: WB Johnson

12 December 1970 2	Darlington	0–2	Rochdale	Darlington
		Report	Blair 44'; Downes 88'	Stadium: Feethams; Attendance: 5595

11 January 1971 3	Rochdale	2–1	Coventry City	Rochdale
	Cross 39'; Butler 80'	Report	Hunt 51'	Stadium: Spotland Stadium; Attendance: 13011; Referee: JE Thacker

23 January 1971 4	Rochdale	3–3	Colchester United	Rochdale
	Ashworth 27'; Buck 54', 61'	Report	Crawford 4'; Lewis 85'; Simmons 86'	Stadium: Spotland Stadium; Attendance: 12321; Referee: R Capey

25 January 1971 4	Colchester United	5–0	Rochdale	Colchester
	Lewis 42'; Simmons 44'; Parry 50' (o.g.); Crawford 70'; Mahon 76'	Report		Stadium: Layer Road; Attendance: 11205; Referee: R Capey

=== League Cup ===
19 August 1970 1	Rochdale	1–0	Southport	Rochdale
	Jenkins	Report		Stadium: Spotland Stadium; Attendance: 4057

9 September 1970 2	Crystal Palace	3–3	Rochdale	London
	Birchenall; Jenkins (o.g.); Payne	Report	Jenkins; Gowans; Whitehead	Stadium: Selhurst Park; Attendance: 16265

14 September 1970 2	Rochdale	1–3	Crystal Palace	Rochdale
	Smith	Report	Taylor; Scott; Queen	Stadium: Spotland Stadium; Attendance: 8911

=== Lancashire Cup ===
16 September 1970 1	Burnley	1–1	Rochdale	Burnley
	Goal		Butler	Stadium: Turf Moor

23 September 1970 1	Rochdale	1–0	Burnley	Rochdale
	Jenkins			Stadium: Spotland Stadium; Attendance: 1802

13 October 1970 2	Blackburn Rovers	0–2	Rochdale	Blackburn
			Arrowsmith	Stadium: Ewood Park; Attendance: 561

3 February 1971 3	Rochdale	3–1	Everton	Rochdale
	Jenkins; Riley		Goal	Stadium: Spotland Stadium; Attendance: 1111

4 March 1971 SF	Chorley	0–0	Rochdale	Chorley
				Stadium: Victory Park

29 March 1971 SF	Rochdale	2–1	Chorley	Rochdale
	Jenkins; Whitehead		Goal	Stadium: Spotland Stadium; Attendance: 1410

3 May 1971 F	Rochdale	3–2	Oldham Athletic	Rochdale
	Cross; Ashworth		Goal	Stadium: Spotland Stadium; Attendance: 7003

=== Rose Bowl ===
8 August 1970	Oldham Athletic	1–2	Rochdale	Oldham
	Goal		Arrowsmith; Cross	Stadium: Boundary Park; Attendance: 5078
