= 1971–72 Rochdale A.F.C. season =

English football club season

Rochdale
1971–72 season
- Manager: Dick Conner
- League Division Three: 18th
- FA Cup: 1st Round
- League Cup: 1st Round
- Top goalscorer: League: Peter Gowans; All: David Cross

The 1971–72 season was Rochdale A.F.C.'s 65th in existence and their 3rd consecutive in the Football League Third Division.

== Statistics ==
No.	Pos	Nat	Player	Total		Division 3		F.A. Cup		League Cup		Lancashire Cup		Rose Bowl	
No.	Pos	Nat	Player	Apps	Goals	Apps	Goals	Apps	Goals	Apps	Goals	Apps	Goals	Apps	Goals
	GK	(England) ENG	Rod Jones	11	0	5+0	0	0+0	0	2+0	0	3+0	0	0+1	0
	DF	(Northern Ireland) NIR	Ronnie Blair	38	1	29+1	1	1+0	0	3+0	0	3+0	0	1+0	0
	DF	(England) ENG	Derek Ryder	40	0	32+0	0	1+0	0	3+0	0	3+0	0	1+0	0
	DF	(England) ENG	Graham Smith	52	0	44+0	0	1+0	0	3+0	0	3+0	0	1+0	0
	DF	(England) ENG	Colin Parry	36	1	28+2	1	1+0	0	1+0	0	3+0	0	1+0	0
	MF	(England) ENG	Joe Ashworth	16	1	12+0	1	0+0	0	3+0	0	0+0	0	1+0	0
	FW	(England) ENG	Tony Buck	34	5	24+3	4	1+0	0	1+1	0	3+0	1	1+0	0
	FW	(England) ENG	Reg Jenkins	27	8	20+0	6	1+0	0	3+0	0	2+0	2	1+0	0
	FW	(England) ENG	David Cross	14	10	10+0	8	0+0	0	3+0	2	0+0	0	1+0	0
	MF	(England) ENG	Bobby Downes	41	1	35+1	1	0+0	0	3+0	0	2+0	0	0+0	0
	MF	(England) ENG	Dennis Butler	22	0	17+1	0	0+0	0	3+0	0	0+0	0	0+1	0
	MF	(Scotland) SCO	Peter Gowans	42	10	36+2	9	0+1	0	0+0	0	3+0	1	0+0	0
	MF	(England) ENG	Norman Whitehead	35	4	27+0	4	1+0	0	3+0	0	3+0	0	1+0	0
	DF	(England) ENG	Paul Clarke	6	0	5+0	0	0+0	0	1+0	0	0+0	0	0+0	0
	GK	(England) ENG	Tony Godfrey	44	0	41+0	0	1+0	0	1+0	0	0+0	0	1+0	0
	MF	(England) ENG	Hughen Riley	6	0	2+3	0	0+0	0	0+0	0	0+0	0	1+0	0
	MF	(Scotland) SCO	Len Kinsella	39	3	32+3	3	1+0	0	0+0	0	3+0	0	0+0	0
	FW	(England) ENG	Alf Arrowsmith	18	4	13+2	2	1+0	1	0+0	0	1+1	1	0+0	0
	FW	(Scotland) SCO	Malcolm Darling	36	6	30+4	6	1+0	0	0+0	0	1+0	0	0+0	0
	DF	(England) ENG	Arthur Marsh	28	0	28+0	0	0+0	0	0+0	0	0+0	0	0+0	0
	FW	(England) ENG	Jack Howarth	21	8	21+0	8	0+0	0	0+0	0	0+0	0	0+0	0
	MF	(England) ENG	Lee Brogden	16	1	15+1	1	0+0	0	0+0	0	0+0	0	0+0	0

== Final League Table ==
Pos	Team	Pld	W	D	L	GF	GA	GAv	Pts	Qualification or relegation
16	Wrexham	46	16	8	22	59	63	0.937	40	Qualification for the Cup Winners' Cup first round
17	Halifax Town	46	13	12	21	48	61	0.787	38	
18	Rochdale	46	12	13	21	57	83	0.687	37	
19	York City	46	12	12	22	57	66	0.864	36	
20	Tranmere Rovers	46	10	16	20	50	71	0.704	36	

Rules for classification: 1) Points; 2) Goal average; 3) Goals scored

== Competitions ==
=== Football League Third Division ===
14 August 1971 1	Notts County	4–0	Rochdale	Nottingham
	Mansley 6'; Masson 18'; Stubbs 32'; Hateley 40'	Report	Ashworth (red card) 71'	Stadium: Meadow Lane; Attendance: 10879

21 August 1971 2	Rochdale	2–1	Mansfield Town	Rochdale
	Cross 1'; Jenkins 61'	Report	Ryder 12' (o.g.)	Stadium: Spotland Stadium; Attendance: 3554

28 August 1971 3	Aston Villa	2–0	Rochdale	Aston
	Lochhead 8'; Graydon 40'	Report		Stadium: Villa Park; Attendance: 24280

3 September 1971 4	Rochdale	2–1	Tranmere Rovers	Rochdale
	Cross (pen.); Ashworth	Report	Beamish	Stadium: Spotland Stadium; Attendance: 3691; Referee: H Williams

11 September 1971 5	Bournemouth	4–1	Rochdale	Bournemouth
	Boyer 33'; MacDougall 38', 48' (pen.), 74'	Report	Cross 70'	Stadium: Dean Court; Attendance: 8856

13 September 1971 6	Torquay United	1–1	Rochdale	Torquay
	Welsh	Report	Cross	Stadium: Plainmoor; Attendance: 8885

18 September 1971 7	Rochdale	1–1	Oldham Athletic	Rochdale
	Gowans 23'	Report	Fryatt 37'	Stadium: Spotland Stadium; Attendance: 10926

25 September 1971 8	Barnsley	3–3	Rochdale	Barnsley
	Seal 58'; Millar 67'; Waddell 85'	Report	Jenkins 24', 82'; Cross 55'	Stadium: Oakwell; Attendance: 5805

27 September 1971 9	Rochdale	3–2	Plymouth Argyle	Rochdale
	Kinsella; Cross; Davey (o.g.)	Report	Hutchins; Hinch	Stadium: Spotland Stadium; Attendance: 4519; Referee: V James

2 October 1971 10	Rochdale	5–0	Torquay United	Rochdale
	Cross 31', 82' (pen.); Arrowsmith 37'; Gowans 67'; Whitehead 72'	Report		Stadium: Spotland Stadium; Attendance: 4551

9 October 1971 11	Blackburn Rovers	3–0	Rochdale	Blackburn
	Shanahan 8', 42'; McDonald 20'	Report		Stadium: Ewood Park; Attendance: 8492

16 October 1971 12	Rochdale	1–1	Notts County	Rochdale
	Darling 57'	Report	Bradd 77'	Stadium: Spotland Stadium; Attendance: 4848

19 October 1971 13	Halifax Town	2–2	Rochdale	Halifax
	Brierley 30'; Farley 50'; Robertson (red card) 81'	Report	Kinsella 61', 71'	Stadium: The Shay; Attendance: 3288

23 October 1971 14	Rochdale	3–1	Bristol Rovers	Rochdale
	Whitehead 29'; Downes 33'; Buck 52'	Report	Stephens 76'	Stadium: Spotland Stadium; Attendance: 4753

30 October 1971 15	Swansea City	1–0	Rochdale	Swansea
	Gwyther 5'	Report		Stadium: Vetch Field; Attendance: 7743

6 November 1971 16	Rochdale	0–2	Chesterfield	Rochdale
		Report	Wilson 12', 33'	Stadium: Spotland Stadium; Attendance: 4818

13 November 1971 17	Wrexham	1–3	Rochdale	Wrexham
	Tinnion 70'	Report	Whitehead 10'; Buck 63', 89'	Stadium: Racecourse Ground; Attendance: 7749

26 November 1971 18	Walsall	3–0	Rochdale	Walsall
	Woodward; Jones; Wright	Report		Stadium: Fellows Park; Attendance: 3575; Referee: J Hunting

4 December 1971 19	Rochdale	2–1	Rotherham United	Rochdale
	Jenkins 16'; Gowans 70'	Report	Bentley 1'	Stadium: Spotland Stadium; Attendance: 3384

17 December 1971 20	Tranmere Rovers	2–0	Rochdale	Birkenhead
	Russell; Beamish	Report		Stadium: Prenton Park; Attendance: 2800

27 December 1971 21	Rochdale	0–1	Bradford City	Rochdale
		Report	Hall	Stadium: Spotland Stadium; Attendance: 4722

1 January 1972 22	Oldham Athletic	3–2	Rochdale	Oldham
	Shaw 2'; McNeill 50'; Robins 82'	Report	Gowans 44', 89'	Stadium: Boundary Park; Attendance: 8885

8 January 1972 23	Rochdale	1–0	Aston Villa	Rochdale
	Whitehead 65' (pen.)	Report		Stadium: Spotland Stadium; Attendance: 5874

22 January 1972 24	Plymouth Argyle	4–1	Rochdale	Plymouth
	Hinch 6'; Rickard 55', 67'; Hutchins 83'	Report	Darling 70'	Stadium: Home Park; Attendance: 9187

29 January 1972 25	Rochdale	3–2	Halifax Town	Rochdale
	Parry 22'; Howarth 68', 89'	Report	Atkins 32'; Wallace 79'	Stadium: Spotland Stadium; Attendance: 3124

5 February 1972 26	Rochdale	0–0	Shrewsbury Town	Rochdale
		Report		Stadium: Spotland Stadium; Attendance: 3502

12 February 1972 27	Bristol Rovers	5–2	Rochdale	Bristol
	Stephens 34'; Bannister 38', 47'; Jones 65'; Prince 86'	Report	Darling 23', 63'	Stadium: Eastville Stadium; Attendance: 7344

19 February 1972 28	Rochdale	1–1	Swansea Town	Rochdale
	Arrowsmith 81'	Report	Slattery 21'	Stadium: Spotland Stadium; Attendance: 3097; Referee: V James

26 February 1972 29	Chesterfield	2–0	Rochdale	Chesterfield
	Randall 77'; Wilson 89'	Report		Stadium: Saltergate Recreation Ground; Attendance: 6599

4 March 1972 30	Rochdale	1–0	Wrexham	Rochdale
	Davies 21' (o.g.)	Report		Stadium: Spotland Stadium; Attendance: 2643; Referee: NP Paget

11 March 1972 31	Rochdale	2–1	Blackburn Rovers	Rochdale
	Howarth 8'; Gowans 35'	Report	Field 24'	Stadium: Spotland Stadium; Attendance: 6542

13 March 1972 32	Rochdale	3–2	Port Vale	Rochdale
	Howarth; Gowans	Report	James; Parry (o.g.)	Stadium: Spotland Stadium; Attendance: 3157

18 March 1972 33	Mansfield Town	3–1	Rochdale	Mansfield
	Fairbrother 15'; Wignall 73'; Saunders 83'	Report	Darling 53'	Stadium: Field Mill; Attendance: 5121

20 March 1972 34	York City	2–0	Rochdale	York
	Swallow; Calloway	Report		Stadium: Bootham Crescent; Attendance: 4539

25 March 1972 35	Rochdale	1–1	Bournemouth	Rochdale
	Howarth 63'	Report	MacDougall 33'	Stadium: Spotland Stadium; Attendance: 4437

1 April 1972 36	Bradford City	1–1	Rochdale	Bradford
	O'Neill 90'	Report	Brogden 17'	Stadium: Valley Parade; Attendance: 4889

3 April 1972 37	Rochdale	0–2	Barnsley	Rochdale
		Report	Mahoney; Seal	Stadium: Spotland Stadium; Attendance: 3848; Referee: RB Lee

8 April 1972 38	Shrewsbury Town	2–1	Rochdale	Shrewsbury
	Wood 23'; Andrews 36'	Report	Blair 43'	Stadium: Gay Meadow; Attendance: 2539

12 April 1972 39	Bolton Wanderers	2–1	Rochdale	Bolton
	Byrom; Jones	Report	Howarth	Stadium: Burnden Park; Attendance: 6057; Referee: WS Castle

15 April 1972 40	Rochdale	0–0	Walsall	Rochdale
		Report		Stadium: Spotland Stadium; Attendance: 3027; Referee: H Williams

17 April 1972 41	Rochdale	1–2	York City	Rochdale
	Buck	Report	Burrows; Henderson	Stadium: Spotland Stadium; Attendance: 2776

22 April 1972 42	Rotherham United	5–1	Rochdale	Rotherham
	Gilbert 33', 69'; Swift 51'; Mielczarek 67'; Ham 90'	Report	Gowans 23'	Stadium: Millmoor; Attendance: 4569

24 April 1972 43	Rochdale	2–2	Bolton Wanderers	Rochdale
	Howarth; Darling	Report	Jones; Phillips	Stadium: Spotland Stadium; Attendance: 4826; Referee: JD Williams

29 April 1972 44	Rochdale	1–2	Brighton & Hove Albion	Rochdale
	Jenkins 81' (pen.)	Report	Napier 49'; Beamish 89'	Stadium: Spotland Stadium; Attendance: 4283; Referee: P Baldwin

3 May 1972 45	Brighton & Hove Albion	1–1	Rochdale	Brighton and Hove
	Templeman	Report	Gowans	Stadium: Goldstone Ground; Attendance: 34644

12 May 1972 46	Port Vale	1–1	Rochdale	Stoke-on-Trent
	Horton (pen.)	Report	Jenkins (pen.)	Stadium: Vale Park; Attendance: 2475

=== F.A. Cup ===
20 November 1971 1	Rochdale	1–3	Barnsley	Rochdale
	Arrowsmith 20'	Report	Winstanley 27', 55'; Seal 81'	Stadium: Spotland Stadium; Attendance: 5185

=== League Cup ===
18 August 1971 1	Halifax Town	1–1	Rochdale	Halifax
	Lennard 17'	Report	Rhodes 31' (o.g.)	Stadium: The Shay; Attendance: 5195

24 August 1971 1	Rochdale	2–2 (a.e.t.)	Halifax Town	Rochdale
	Cross 74', 82'	Report	Chadwick 25'; Atkins 50'	Stadium: Spotland Stadium; Attendance: 6016

31 August 1971 1	Rochdale	0–2	Halifax Town	Rochdale
		Report	Wallace 85'; Brierley 89'	Stadium: Spotland Stadium; Attendance: 5718

=== Lancashire Cup ===
13 October 1971	Rochdale	3–0	Blackpool	Rochdale
	Gowans; Buck; Arrowsmith			Stadium: Spotland Stadium

6 December 1971	Rochdale	1–1	Manchester United	Rochdale
	Jenkins		Goal	Stadium: Spotland Stadium; Attendance: 3764

22 December 1971	Manchester United	4–1	Rochdale	Manchester
	Goal		Jenkins	Stadium: Old Trafford

=== Rose Bowl ===
31 July 1971	Oldham Athletic	4–0	Rochdale	Oldham
	Goal			Stadium: Boundary Park; Attendance: 4946
