= 1968–69 Rochdale A.F.C. season =

English football club season

Rochdale
1968–69 season
- Manager: Bob Stokoe; Len Richley
- League Division Four: 3rd
- FA Cup: 1st Round
- League Cup: 1st Round
- Top goalscorer: League: Dennis Butler; All: Dennis Butler

The 1968–69 season was Rochdale A.F.C.'s 62nd in existence and their 10th consecutive in the Football League Fourth Division. The club finished in 3rd position and achieved promotion to Division Three.

== Statistics ==
No.	Pos	Nat	Player	Total		Division 4		F.A. Cup		League Cup		Lancashire Cup		Rose Bowl	
No.	Pos	Nat	Player	Apps	Goals	Apps	Goals	Apps	Goals	Apps	Goals	Apps	Goals	Apps	Goals
	GK	(England) ENG	Chris Harker	53	0	46+0	0	2+0	0	1+0	0	3+0	0	1+0	0
	DF	(England) ENG	Vince Radcliffe	32	1	26+0	1	2+0	0	1+0	0	3+0	0	0+0	0
	DF	(England) ENG	Derek Ryder	53	0	46+0	0	2+0	0	1+0	0	3+0	0	1+0	0
	DF	(England) ENG	Vince Leech	50	0	43+0	0	2+0	0	1+0	0	3+0	0	1+0	0
	DF	(England) ENG	Colin Parry	51	0	45+0	0	2+0	0	1+0	0	2+0	0	1+0	0
	MF	(England) ENG	Joe Ashworth	44	1	39+0	1	2+0	0	1+0	0	1+0	0	1+0	0
	MF	(England) ENG	Norman Whitehead	49	2	41+1	2	2+0	0	1+0	0	3+0	0	1+0	0
	FW	(England) ENG	Joe Fletcher	13	2	8+2	2	0+0	0	1+0	0	1+0	0	1+0	0
	FW	(England) ENG	Reg Jenkins	38	13	28+5	13	0+1	0	1+0	0	1+1	0	1+0	0
	MF	(England) ENG	Billy Rudd	53	4	46+0	4	2+0	0	1+0	0	3+0	0	1+0	0
	MF	(England) ENG	Dennis Butler	53	16	44+2	16	2+0	0	1+0	0	3+0	0	1+0	0
	MF	(England) ENG	Hughen Riley	2	0	1+0	0	0+0	0	0+0	0	1+0	0	0+0	0
	FW	(England) ENG	Steve Melledew	36	15	26+5	12	2+0	0	0+1	1	2+0	2	0+0	0
	DF	(England) ENG	Graham Smith	38	2	32+1	1	2+0	0	0+0	0	2+0	0	0+1	1
	FW	(England) ENG	Terry Melling	23	8	20+0	8	0+0	0	0+0	0	3+0	0	0+0	0
	FW	(England) ENG	Tony Buck	17	8	15+2	8	0+0	0	0+0	0	0+0	0	0+0	0
	DF		Steve Lee	1	0	0+0	0	0+0	0	0+0	0	0+0	0	1+0	0

== Final League Table ==
Pos	Team	Pld	W	D	L	GF	GA	GAv	Pts	Promotion or relegation
1	Doncaster Rovers (C, P)	46	21	17	8	65	38	1.711	59	Promotion to the Third Division
2	Halifax Town (P)	46	20	17	9	53	37	1.432	57	Promotion to the Third Division
3	Rochdale (P)	46	18	20	8	68	35	1.943	56	Promotion to the Third Division
4	Bradford City (P)	46	18	20	8	65	46	1.413	56	Promotion to the Third Division
5	Darlington	46	17	18	11	62	45	1.378	52	

Source: rsssf.com
Rules for classification: 1) points; 2) goal average; 3) number of goals scored.
(C) Champions; (P) Promoted

== Competitions ==
=== Football League Fourth Division ===
10 August 1968 1	Rochdale	3–2	Scunthorpe United	Rochdale
	Butler 31'; Jenkins 44' (pen.), 64' (pen.)	Report	Kerr 76'; Deere	Stadium: Spotland Stadium; Attendance: 3253

17 August 1968 2	Colchester United	0–0	Rochdale	Colchester
		Report		Stadium: Layer Road; Attendance: 3969

24 August 1968 3	Rochdale	1–1	Exeter City	Rochdale
	Melledew 70'	Report	Mitten 55' (pen.)	Stadium: Spotland Stadium; Attendance: 3225

26 August 1968 4	Brentford	1–1	Rochdale	Brentford
	Deakin 16'	Report	Melledew 70'	Stadium: Griffin Park; Attendance: 9149

31 August 1968 5	Port Vale	1–1	Rochdale	Stoke-on-Trent
	Chapman 55'	Report	Melledew 36'	Stadium: Old Recreation Ground; Attendance: 4591

7 September 1968 6	Rochdale	1–1	Peterborough United	Rochdale
	Melledew 43'	Report	Hall 66'	Stadium: Spotland Stadium; Attendance: 4030

14 September 1968 7	Chesterfield	1–1	Rochdale	Chesterfield
	Hollett 58'	Report	Melledew 80'	Stadium: Saltergate Recreation Ground; Attendance: 5903

17 September 1968 8	Doncaster Rovers	2–0	Rochdale	Doncaster
	Johnson; Gilfillan	Report		Stadium: Belle Vue; Attendance: 12183

21 September 1968 9	Rochdale	6–0	Bradford City	Rochdale
	Butler 24'; Rudd 31'; Melledew 35', 71'; Fletcher 68', 87'	Report		Stadium: Spotland Stadium; Attendance: 4136

28 September 1968 10	York City	0–0	Rochdale	York
		Report		Stadium: Bootham Crescent; Attendance: 3509

5 October 1968 11	Rochdale	0–0	Workington	Rochdale
		Report		Stadium: Spotland Stadium; Attendance: 4535

7 October 1968 12	Rochdale	0–0	Brentford	Rochdale
		Report		Stadium: Spotland Stadium; Attendance: 5181

12 October 1968 13	Darlington	0–0	Rochdale	Darlington
		Report		Stadium: Feethams; Attendance: 7113

19 October 1968 14	Rochdale	0–1	Swansea Town	Rochdale
		Report	Gwyther 53' (pen.)	Stadium: Spotland Stadium; Attendance: 4771

26 October 1968 15	Southend United	1–3	Rochdale	Southend-on-Sea
	Best 73'	Report	Butler 76', 82'; Melledew 89'	Stadium: Roots Hall; Attendance: 9486

2 November 1968 16	Rochdale	6–0	Bradford Park Avenue	Rochdale
	Melling 8'; Rudd 14', 87'; Melledew 29'; Radcliffe 71'; Butler 83' (pen.)	Report		Stadium: Spotland Stadium; Attendance: 2795

4 November 1968 17	Rochdale	0–1	Newport County	Rochdale
		Report	Hill	Stadium: Spotland Stadium; Attendance: 4223

9 November 1968 18	Aldershot	0–0	Rochdale	Aldershot
		Report		Stadium: Recreation Ground; Attendance: 5185

23 November 1968 19	Wrexham	3–2	Rochdale	Wrexham
	Griffiths 23'; May 24'; Kinsey 82'	Report	Melling 26', 60'	Stadium: Racecourse Ground; Attendance: 5663

30 November 1968 20	Rochdale	0–0	Notts County	Rochdale
		Report		Stadium: Spotland Stadium; Attendance: 2673

7 December 1968 21	Grimsby Town	2–0	Rochdale	Cleethorpes
	Walker 22', 81'	Report		Stadium: Blundell Park; Attendance: 2714

21 December 1968 22	Swansea Town	3–0	Rochdale	Swansea
	Williams 7', 51'; Biggs 58'	Report		Stadium: Vetch Field; Attendance: 5703

26 December 1968 23	Workington	1–2	Rochdale	Workington
	Ogilvie	Report	Jenkins	Stadium: Borough Park; Attendance: 2921

4 January 1969 24	Rochdale	6–1	Grimsby Town	Rochdale
	Melling 24'; Jenkins 38' (pen.), 51', 67'; Whitehead 62'; Rudd 79'	Report	Ross 27' (pen.)	Stadium: Spotland Stadium; Attendance: 2038

11 January 1969 25	Bradford Park Avenue	1–4	Rochdale	Bradford
	Andrews 28'	Report	Whitehead 44'; Melling 47', 60', 70'	Stadium: Park Avenue; Attendance: 5453

18 January 1969 26	Rochdale	3–0	Aldershot	Rochdale
	Melling 32'; Butler 39', 59' (pen.)	Report		Stadium: Spotland Stadium; Attendance: 3305

1 February 1969 27	Lincoln City	0–0	Rochdale	Lincoln
		Report		Stadium: Sincil Bank; Attendance: 8621

10 February 1969 28	Newport County	1–1	Rochdale	Newport
	Wood	Report	Butler	Stadium: Somerton Park; Attendance: 2607

24 February 1969 29	Rochdale	2–0	Darlington	Rochdale
	Jenkins	Report		Stadium: Spotland Stadium; Attendance: 3815

1 March 1969 30	Scunthorpe United	0–0	Rochdale	Scunthorpe
		Report		Stadium: Old Show Ground; Attendance: 3102

8 March 1969 31	Rochdale	4–0	Colchester United	Rochdale
	Jenkins 52'; Butler 75', 90'; Buck 82'	Report		Stadium: Spotland Stadium; Attendance: 4988

10 March 1969 32	Rochdale	2–1	Lincoln City	Rochdale
	Butler 25'; Buck 55'	Report	Lewis 44'	Stadium: Spotland Stadium; Attendance: 5803

15 March 1969 33	Exeter City	2–2	Rochdale	Exeter
	Mitten 40'; Binney 85'	Report	Buck 26', 47'	Stadium: St James Park; Attendance: 4061

22 March 1969 34	Rochdale	1–0	Port Vale	Rochdale
	Butler 82'	Report		Stadium: Spotland Stadium; Attendance: 4860

29 March 1969 35	Peterborough United	0–1	Rochdale	Peterborough
		Report	Buck 52'; Melledew (red card) 89'	Stadium: London Road Stadium; Attendance: 4107

5 April 1969 36	Rochdale	2–1	York City	Rochdale
	Smith 62'; Buck 65'	Report	MacDougall 8'	Stadium: Spotland Stadium; Attendance: 6886; Referee: R Barker

7 April 1969 37	Rochdale	0–0	Doncaster Rovers	Rochdale
		Report		Stadium: Spotland Stadium; Attendance: 12647

8 April 1969 38	Chester	2–1	Rochdale	Chester
	Provan; Dearden	Report	Melledew	Stadium: Sealand Road; Attendance: 3820

12 April 1969 39	Bradford City	1–1	Rochdale	Bradford
	Ham 66'	Report	Ashworth 74'	Stadium: Valley Parade; Attendance: 9449

14 April 1969 40	Rochdale	4–1	Chester	Rochdale
	Buck; Butler; Melledew	Report	Talbot	Stadium: Spotland Stadium; Attendance: 4884

19 April 1969 41	Rochdale	0–0	Chesterfield	Rochdale
		Report		Stadium: Spotland Stadium; Attendance: 7600

23 April 1969 42	Rochdale	2–1	Wrexham	Rochdale
	Buck; Butler (pen.)	Report	Purdie	Stadium: Spotland Stadium; Attendance: 6635

28 April 1969 43	Notts County	1–1	Rochdale	Nottingham
	Butlin	Report	Jenkins	Stadium: Meadow Lane; Attendance: 3678

30 April 1969 44	Rochdale	1–0	Halifax Town	Rochdale
	Butler 30'	Report		Stadium: Spotland Stadium; Attendance: 12806

8 May 1969 45	Halifax Town	1–0	Rochdale	Halifax
	Massie 76'	Report		Stadium: The Shay; Attendance: 17186

10 May 1969 46	Rochdale	3–0	Southend United	Rochdale
	Melledew 15'; Jenkins 67' (pen.), 80'	Report		Stadium: Spotland Stadium; Attendance: 9095

=== F.A. Cup ===
16 November 1968 1	Barnsley	0–0	Rochdale	Barnsley
		Report		Stadium: Oakwell; Attendance: 11414

18 November 1968 1	Rochdale	0–1	Barnsley	Rochdale
		Report	Dean	Stadium: Spotland Stadium; Attendance: 7340

=== League Cup ===
14 August 1968 1	Workington	2–1	Rochdale	Workington
	Tinnion; Ogilvie	Report	Melledew	Stadium: Borough Park; Attendance: 2558

=== Lancashire Cup ===
22 October 1968	Oldham Athletic	1–1	Rochdale	Oldham
	Goal		Melledew	Stadium: Boundary Park

28 October 1968	Rochdale	2–2	Oldham Athletic	Rochdale
	Melledew; Hunter (o.g.)		Goal	Stadium: Spotland Stadium; Attendance: 1977

25 November 1968	Rochdale	0–1	Oldham Athletic	Rochdale
			Goal	Stadium: Spotland Stadium; Attendance: 2458

=== Rose Bowl ===
2 August 1968	Oldham Athletic	2–1	Rochdale	Oldham
	Goal		Smith	Stadium: Boundary Park
