= 1966–67 Mansfield Town F.C. season =

Mansfield Town
1966–67 season
- Manager: Tommy Cummings
- Stadium: Field Mill
- Third Division: 9th
- FA Cup: Fourth Round
- League Cup: Second Round

The 1966–67 season was Mansfield Town's 30th season in the Football League and 6th in the Third Division, they finished in 9th position with 49 points.

== Final league table ==
Pos	Team	Pld	W	D	L	GF	GA	GAv	Pts
7	Torquay United	46	21	9	16	73	54	1.352	51
8	Swindon Town	46	20	10	16	81	59	1.373	50
9	Mansfield Town	46	20	9	17	84	79	1.063	49
10	Oldham Athletic	46	19	10	17	80	63	1.270	48
11	Gillingham	46	15	16	15	58	62	0.935	46

== Results ==
=== Football League Third Division ===
Match	Date	Opponent	Venue	Result	Attendance	Scorers
1	20 August 1966	Walsall	A	2–1	10,429	Curry (2)
2	27 August 1966	Peterborough United	H	0–0	6,326	
3	3 September 1966	Torquay United	A	2–1	5,577	Brace (2)
4	5 September 1966	Oldham Athletic	H	2–4	9,766	Hall (2)
5	10 September 1966	Brighton & Hove Albion	H	2–1	5,171	Brace, Hall
6	17 September 1966	Darlington	A	1–1	7,033	Curry
7	24 September 1966	Queens Park Rangers	H	1–7	6,260	Brace
8	27 September 1966	Oldham Athletic	A	0–0	14,978	
9	1 October 1966	Watford	A	1–0	5,219	Curry
10	8 October 1966	Oxford United	H	1–1	5,023	Morris
11	15 October 1966	Bristol Rovers	A	4–4	7,599	Rowland (2), Brace, Mitchinson
12	17 October 1966	Doncaster Rovers	H	3–1	8,257	McKinney, Brace, Mitchinson
13	22 October 1966	Colchester United	H	2–0	6,038	Brace, Mitchinson
14	29 October 1966	Shrewsbury Town	A	0–1	4,925	
15	31 October 1966	Torquay United	H	4–2	6,101	Morris, Mitchinson, Brace, Curry
16	5 November 1966	Middlesbrough	H	4–5	6,379	Morris, Curry (2), Ferns
17	12 November 1966	Swansea Town	A	1–0	5,553	Brace
18	15 November 1966	Doncaster Rovers	A	6–4	7,188	Brace (2), Morris, McKinney, Curry (2)
19	19 November 1966	Bournemouth & Boscombe Athletic	H	1–0	6,681	Rowland
20	3 December 1966	Gillingham	H	4–1	6,158	Mitchinson, Rowland (2), Brace
21	10 December 1966	Workington	A	4–2	2,118	Brace (2), Curry (2)
22	17 December 1966	Walsall	H	4–1	8,771	Curry (2), Morris, Mitchinson
23	23 December 1966	Scunthorpe United	A	1–2	6,458	Brace
24	27 December 1966	Scunthorpe United	H	3–1	10,291	Rowland (2), Morris
25	31 December 1966	Peterborough United	A	1–3	6,596	Curry
26	14 January 1967	Brighton & Hove Albion	A	0–1	13,591	
27	21 January 1967	Darlington	H	2–2	13,591	Brace, Morris
28	4 February 1967	Queens Park Rangers	A	0–0	14,728	
29	11 February 1967	Watford	H	2–1	11,289	Morris, Curry
30	22 February 1967	Reading	H	4–2	6,824	Morris, Curry (2), Mitchinson
31	25 February 1967	Oxford United	A	1–2	8,235	Morris
32	4 March 1967	Bristol Rovers	H	2–0	12,815	Morris, Mitchinson
33	11 March 1967	Reading	A	2–2	6,232	Morris, Curry
34	18 March 1967	Colchester United	A	0–3	4,175	
35	24 March 1967	Grimsby Town	A	2–1	10,017	Rowland, Knox
36	25 March 1967	Shrewsbury Town	H	0–1	10,118	
37	28 March 1967	Grimsby Town	H	4–0	11,735	Taylor (o.g.), Mitchinson, Brace (2)
38	1 April 1967	Middlesbrough	A	0–1	23,226	
39	8 April 1967	Swansea Town	H	1–2	7,478	Curry
40	11 April 1967	Swindon Town	A	1–3	13,451	Curry
41	15 April 1967	Bournemouth & Boscombe Athletic	A	3–1	4,831	Brace (2), Morris
42	22 April 1967	Orient	H	1–1	8,875	Curry
43	24 April 1967	Swindon Town	H	1–3	7,836	Brace
44	29 April 1967	Gillingham	A	2–5	4,880	Knox, Curry
45	6 May 1967	Workington	H	0–1	3,486	
46	12 May 1967	Orient	A	2–4	4,918	Mitchinson, Rowland

=== FA Cup ===
Round	Date	Opponent	Venue	Result	Attendance	Scorers
R1	26 November 1966	Bangor City	H	4–1	6,470	Mitchinson, Brace, Curry (2)
R2	7 January 1967	Scunthorpe United	H	2–1	9,446	Mitchinson, Brace
R3	28 January 1967	Middlesbrough	H	2–0	17,332	Mitchinson, Brace
R4	18 February 1967	Sheffield Wednesday	A	0–4	49,049	

=== League Cup ===
Round	Date	Opponent	Venue	Result	Attendance	Scorers
R1	24 August 1966	Notts County	A	1–1	7,002	Williams
R1 Replay	29 August 1966	Notts County	H	3–0	6,001	Brace (2), Burns
R2	13 September 1966	Wolverhampton Wanderers	A	1–2	12,098	Curry

== Squad statistics ==
- Squad list sourced from 1966–67 Mansfield Town F.C. season at the English National Football Archive (subscription required)

Pos.	Name	League		FA Cup		League Cup		Total	
Pos.	Name	Apps	Goals	Apps	Goals	Apps	Goals	Apps	Goals
GK	(England) Dave Hollins	13	0	0	0	0	0	13	0
GK	(England) Alan Humphreys	28	0	3	0	3	0	34	0
GK	(Scotland) Allan Wilson	5	0	1	0	0	0	6	0
DF	(England) Stuart Boam	1	0	0	0	0	0	1	0
DF	(England) John Coleman	30	0	4	0	0(2)	0	34(2)	0
DF	(England) Dick Edwards	13	0	0	0	0	0	13	0
DF	(England) Philip Ferns	44	1	4	0	3	0	51	1
DF	(England) Bill McKinney	40	2	4	0	3	0	47	2
DF	(England) Bill Richardson	41	0	3	0	3	0	47	0
DF	(England) Bill Williams	15(2)	0	3	0	3	1	21(2)	1
MF	(Italy) Franco Derko	1	0	0	0	0	0	1	0
MF	(England) Ian Hall	34	3	4	0	1	0	39	3
MF	(England) Tommy Mitchinson	46	10	4	2	3	0	53	12
MF	(England) Peter Morris	41	13	3	0	3	0	47	13
FW	(England) Paul Aldread	1	0	0	0	0	0	1	0
FW	(England) Stuart Brace	44(1)	22	4	3	3	2	51(1)	27
FW	(England) Neil Burns	2(1)	0	0	0	1	1	3(1)	1
FW	(England) Albert Cheesebrough	4	0	1	0	1	0	6	0
FW	(England) Bill Curry	45	22	4	3	3	1	52	26
FW	(England) John Gregson	21(1)	0	0	0	3	0	24(1)	0
FW	(Scotland) Thomas Knox	13	2	0	0	0	0	13	2
FW	(England) Jimmy McGeorge	5(5)	0	0	0	0	0	5(5)	0
FW	(England) John Oldham	0(1)	0	0	0	0	0	0(1)	0
FW	(England) John Rowland	19	9	2	0	0	0	21	9
