= 1972–73 Rochdale A.F.C. season =

English football club season

Rochdale
1972–73 season
- Manager: Dick Conner
- League Division Three: 13th
- FA Cup: 1st Round
- League Cup: 1st Round
- Top goalscorer: League: Malcolm Darling; Reg Jenkins; All: Malcolm Darling; Reg Jenkins

The 1972–73 season was Rochdale A.F.C.'s 66th in existence and their 4th consecutive season in the Football League Third Division.

== Statistics ==
No.	Pos	Nat	Player	Total		Division 3		F.A. Cup		League Cup		Lancashire Cup		Rose Bowl	
No.	Pos	Nat	Player	Apps	Goals	Apps	Goals	Apps	Goals	Apps	Goals	Apps	Goals	Apps	Goals
	GK	(England) ENG	Gordon Morritt	33	0	31+0	0	0+0	0	2+0	0	0+0	0	0+0	0
	DF	(England) ENG	Graham Smith	53	1	45+0	0	1+0	0	2+0	0	4+0	1	1+0	0
	MF	(England) ENG	Bobby Downes	34	1	27+2	1	0+0	0	2+0	0	2+0	0	1+0	0
	MF	(Scotland) SCO	Peter Gowans	52	6	44+0	6	1+0	0	2+0	0	4+0	0	0+1	0
	DF	(England) ENG	Colin Blant	47	0	42+0	0	1+0	0	2+0	0	1+0	0	1+0	0
	MF	(Scotland) SCO	Len Kinsella	50	0	43+0	0	1+0	0	2+0	0	3+0	0	1+0	0
	MF	(England) ENG	Dennis Butler	5	0	3+0	0	0+0	0	1+0	0	0+0	0	1+0	0
	FW	(Scotland) SCO	Malcolm Darling	53	12	45+0	8	1+0	0	2+0	1	4+0	2	0+1	1
	FW	(England) ENG	Jack Howarth	25	5	19+0	4	1+0	0	2+0	0	2+0	1	1+0	0
	FW	(England) ENG	Reg Jenkins	31	11	22+3	8	1+0	1	2+0	0	2+0	2	1+0	0
	MF	(England) ENG	Keith Bebbington	44	3	34+3	3	1+0	0	2+0	0	3+0	0	0+1	0
	DF	(England) ENG	Arthur Marsh	43	0	36+1	0	0+0	0	0+1	0	4+0	0	1+0	0
	MF	(England) ENG	Lee Brogden	31	3	26+2	3	1+0	0	0+0	0	1+1	0	0+0	0
	FW	(England) ENG	Tony Buck	8	1	3+2	1	0+1	0	0+0	0	1+0	0	1+0	0
	DF	(England) ENG	Dick Renwick	47	0	41+0	0	1+0	0	1+0	0	3+0	0	1+0	0
	DF	(England) ENG	Barry Bradbury	6	0	4+1	0	0+0	0	0+0	0	1+0	0	0+0	0
	GK	(England) ENG	Harry Wainman	10	0	9+0	0	0+0	0	0+0	0	1+0	0	0+0	0
	MF	(Scotland) SCO	Jim Bowie	5	0	1+2	0	0+0	0	0+0	0	2+0	0	0+0	0
	GK	(England) ENG	Rod Jones	9	0	6+0	0	1+0	0	0+0	0	1+0	0	1+0	0
	MF	(England) ENG	Paul Fielding	1	0	0+1	0	0+0	0	0+0	0	0+0	0	0+0	0
	FW	(England) ENG	Bill Atkins	22	7	21+0	7	0+0	0	0+0	0	1+0	0	0+0	0
	MF	(England) ENG	Charlie Simpson	2	1	1+0	1	0+0	0	0+0	0	1+0	0	0+0	0
	FW	(England) ENG	Leo Skeete	3	3	3+0	3	0+0	0	0+0	0	0+0	0	0+0	0
	MF	(England) ENG	Dave Hunt	3	0	0+0	0	0+0	0	0+0	0	2+1	0	0+0	0
	GK	(England) ENG	Mike Poole	2	0	0+0	0	0+0	0	0+0	0	2+0	0	0+0	0

== Final League Table ==
Pos	Team	Pld	W	D	L	GF	GA	GAv	Pts
11	Charlton Athletic	46	17	11	18	69	67	1.030	45
12	Wrexham	46	14	17	15	55	54	1.019	45
13	Rochdale	46	14	17	15	48	54	0.889	45
14	Southend United	46	17	10	19	61	54	1.130	44
15	Shrewsbury Town	46	15	14	17	46	54	0.852	44

Source: rsssf.com

== Competitions ==
=== Football League Third Division ===
12 August 1972 1	Rochdale	0–0	Port Vale	Rochdale
		Report		Stadium: Spotland Stadium; Attendance: 2661

19 August 1972 2	Blackburn Rovers	1–1	Rochdale	Blackburn
	Endean 56'	Report	Howarth 83'	Stadium: Ewood Park; Attendance: 6172

26 August 1972 3	Rochdale	0–2	Charlton Athletic	Rochdale
		Report	Horsfield 7'; Peacock 75'	Stadium: Spotland Stadium; Attendance: 2584

28 August 1972 4	Southend United	1–2	Rochdale	Southend-on-Sea
	Moore 90'	Report	Jenkins 11'; Howarth 30'	Stadium: Roots Hall; Attendance: 8862

2 September 1972 5	Swansea City	2–3	Rochdale	Swansea
	Williams 20'; Evans 79'	Report	Jenkins 48'; Gowans 69'; Howarth 80'	Stadium: Vetch Field; Attendance: 2457

9 September 1972 6	Rochdale	1–1	Tranmere Rovers	Rochdale
	Jenkins 25'	Report	Crossley 28'	Stadium: Spotland Stadium; Attendance: 2326

16 September 1972 7	Notts County	2–2	Rochdale	Nottingham
	Needham 36'; Nixon 88'	Report	Brogden 48'; Gowans 74'	Stadium: Meadow Lane; Attendance: 7991; Referee: AP Oliver

19 September 1972 8	Scunthorpe United	1–2	Rochdale	Scunthorpe
	McDonald	Report	Darling	Stadium: Old Show Ground; Attendance: 3710

23 September 1972 9	Rochdale	1–0	Wrexham	Rochdale
	Brogden 88'	Report		Stadium: Spotland Stadium; Attendance: 3412

25 September 1972 10	Rochdale	2–1	Walsall	Rochdale
	Brogden; Bebbington	Report	Morris	Stadium: Spotland Stadium; Attendance: 4749; Referee: H Davey

30 September 1972 11	Grimsby Town	1–0	Rochdale	Cleethorpes
	Worthington 65'	Report		Stadium: Blundell Park; Attendance: 12173

7 October 1972 12	Rochdale	1–0	Watford	Rochdale
	Franks 64' (o.g.)	Report		Stadium: Spotland Stadium; Attendance: 3871

9 October 1972 13	Rochdale	0–0	Halifax Town	Rochdale
		Report		Stadium: Spotland Stadium; Attendance: 5425

14 October 1972 14	Shrewsbury Town	3–2	Rochdale	Shrewsbury
	Hughes 20'; Bridgwood 49'; Blant 88' (o.g.)	Report	Darling 21'; Jenkins 51' (pen.)	Stadium: Gay Meadow; Attendance: 2502

21 October 1972 15	Rochdale	2–2	Bolton Wanderers	Rochdale
	Gowans 28'; Jenkins 47'	Report	Byrom 44'; Nicholson 78'	Stadium: Spotland Stadium; Attendance: 7168; Referee: DW Smith

24 October 1972 16	Bournemouth	4–2	Rochdale	Bournemouth
	Boyer; Gabriel; Machin	Report	Bebbington; Gowans	Stadium: Dean Court; Attendance: 11741

28 October 1972 17	Brentford	1–0	Rochdale	Brentford
	Docherty 5'	Report		Stadium: Griffin Park; Attendance: 9201

4 November 1972 18	Walsall	0–2	Rochdale	Walsall
		Report	Howarth 84'; Jenkins 86'	Stadium: Fellows Park; Attendance: 5682; Referee: KE Walker

11 November 1972 19	Rochdale	0–2	Scunthorpe United	Rochdale
		Report	Heath 21'; Kirk 58'	Stadium: Spotland Stadium; Attendance: 2551

25 November 1972 20	Rochdale	1–2	Chesterfield	Rochdale
	Buck 84'	Report	Large 41'; Smith 48' (o.g.)	Stadium: Spotland Stadium; Attendance: 1982

2 December 1972 21	Rotherham United	0–0	Rochdale	Rotherham
		Report		Stadium: Millmoor; Attendance: 4590

9 December 1972 22	Rochdale	0–0	Bristol Rovers	Rochdale
		Report	Taylor (red card) 79'	Stadium: Spotland Stadium; Attendance: 1792

23 December 1972 23	Rochdale	0–0	Oldham Athletic	Rochdale
		Report		Stadium: Spotland Stadium; Attendance: 6702

26 December 1972 24	Wrexham	3–3	Rochdale	Wrexham
	Ashcroft 49', 64'; May 58'	Report	Atkins 23', 42'; Darling 39'	Stadium: Racecourse Ground; Attendance: 3958

30 December 1972 25	Rochdale	0–1	Blackburn Rovers	Rochdale
		Report	Field 28'	Stadium: Spotland Stadium; Attendance: 5116

6 January 1973 26	Charlton Athletic	1–0	Rochdale	London
	Horsfield 38'	Report		Stadium: The Valley; Attendance: 5048

29 January 1973 27	Rochdale	1–0	Bournemouth	Rochdale
	Darling	Report		Stadium: Spotland Stadium; Attendance: 3575

3 February 1973 28	Halifax Town	0–0	Rochdale	Halifax
		Report		Stadium: The Shay; Attendance: 2422

6 February 1973 29	Tranmere Rovers	0–1	Rochdale	Birkenhead
		Report	Atkins	Stadium: Prenton Park; Attendance: 8329

10 February 1973 30	Rochdale	4–1	Notts County	Rochdale
	Jenkins 33', 88'; Downes 43'; Brindley 76' (o.g.)	Report	Nixon 32'	Stadium: Spotland Stadium; Attendance: 3092

24 February 1973 31	Rochdale	0–6	Plymouth Argyle	Rochdale
		Report	Rickard 23', 54 ' Welsh 26', 75'; Provan 31' (pen.); Latcham 66'	Stadium: Spotland Stadium; Attendance: 2622

2 March 1973 32	Watford	0–0	Rochdale	Watford
		Report		Stadium: Vicarage Road; Attendance: 5338

6 March 1973 33	Bristol Rovers	0–0	Rochdale	Bristol
		Report		Stadium: Eastville Stadium; Attendance: 11767

10 March 1973 34	Rochdale	1–1	Shrewsbury Town	Rochdale
	Darling 16'	Report	Calloway 73'	Stadium: Spotland Stadium; Attendance: 2195

12 March 1973 35	Rochdale	1–1	Swansea City	Rochdale
	Darling 81'	Report	Gwyther 79'	Stadium: Spotland Stadium; Attendance: 2037

17 March 1973 36	Bolton Wanderers	2–1	Rochdale	Bolton
	Byrom 51'; Jones 68'	Report	Atkins 6'	Stadium: Burnden Park; Attendance: 18154; Referee: R Tinkler

19 March 1973 37	Rochdale	1–0	York City	Rochdale
	Bebbington	Report		Stadium: Spotland Stadium; Attendance: 2100

24 March 1973 38	Rochdale	0–1	Brentford	Rochdale
		Report	Allen 35'	Stadium: Spotland Stadium; Attendance: 1747

31 March 1973 39	Chesterfield	2–1	Rochdale	Chesterfield
	Sinclair 44'; Large 87'	Report	Simpson 13'	Stadium: Saltergate Recreation Ground; Attendance: 3576

7 April 1973 40	Rochdale	0–1	Rotherham United	Rochdale
		Report	Mullen 20'	Stadium: Spotland Stadium; Attendance: 1588

9 April 1973 41	Port Vale	0–0	Rochdale	Stoke-on-Trent
		Report		Stadium: Vale Park; Attendance: 6413

14 April 1973 42	York City	1–2	Rochdale	York
	Stone 1'	Report	Gowans 51'; Atkins 54'	Stadium: Bootham Crescent; Attendance: 2387

20 April 1973 43	Oldham Athletic	0–0	Rochdale	Oldham
		Report		Stadium: Boundary Park; Attendance: 9829

23 April 1973 44	Rochdale	3–2	Grimsby Town	Rochdale
	Wigginton (o.g.); Atkins; Skeete	Report	Hubbard; Brace	Stadium: Spotland Stadium; Attendance: 1911

28 April 1973 45	Rochdale	3–2	Southend United	Rochdale
	Darling 67'; Skeete 78'; Atkins 87'	Report	Best 26'; Johnson 88'	Stadium: Spotland Stadium; Attendance: 2081; Referee: R Capey

1 May 1973 46	Plymouth Argyle	3–2	Rochdale	Plymouth
	Hague; Hore	Report	Skeete; Gowans	Stadium: Home Park; Attendance: 9917

=== F.A. Cup ===
18 November 1972 1	Rochdale	1–2	Bangor City	Rochdale
	Jenkins 33' (pen.)	Report	Brodie; Marsden	Stadium: Spotland Stadium; Attendance: 3181

=== League Cup ===
16 August 1972 1	Blackburn Rovers	0–1	Rochdale	Blackburn
		Report	Darling 67'	Stadium: Ewood Park; Attendance: 6292

6 September 1972 2	Manchester City	4–0	Rochdale	Manchester
	Marsh; Lee; Bell	Report		Stadium: Maine Road; Attendance: 17222

=== Lancashire Cup ===
16 October 1972 2	Rochdale	1–1	Manchester City	Rochdale
	Smith		Goal	Stadium: Spotland Stadium; Attendance: 1521

8 November 1972 2	Manchester City	2–4	Rochdale	Manchester
	Goal		Howarth; Darling; Jenkins	Stadium: Maine Road

13 December 1972 3	Rochdale	0–0	Bury	Rochdale
				Stadium: Spotland Stadium

13 January 1973 3	Bury	5–1	Rochdale	Bury
	Goal		Darling	Stadium: Gigg Lane

=== Rose Bowl ===
28 July 1972	Rochdale	1–2	Oldham Athletic	Rochdale
	Darling		Goal	Stadium: Spotland Stadium; Attendance: 2973
