= 1967–68 Mansfield Town F.C. season =

Mansfield Town
1967–68 season
- Manager: Tommy Eggleston
- Stadium: Field Mill
- Third Division: 21st
- FA Cup: First Round
- League Cup: First Round

The 1967–68 season was Mansfield Town's 31st season in the Football League and 7th in the Third Division, they finished in 21st position with 37 points only avoiding relegation after Peterborough United were docked 19 points by the League for making irregular payments to players.

== Final league table ==
Pos	Team	Pld	W	D	L	GF	GA	GAv	Pts	Promotion or relegation
18	Orient	46	12	17	17	46	62	0.742	41	
19	Tranmere Rovers	46	14	12	20	62	74	0.838	40	
20	Mansfield Town	46	12	13	21	51	67	0.761	37	
21	Grimsby Town (R)	46	14	9	23	52	69	0.754	37	Relegation to the Fourth Division
22	Colchester United (R)	46	9	15	22	50	87	0.575	33	Relegation to the Fourth Division

Source: rsssf.com
(R) Relegated

== Results ==
=== Football League Third Division ===
Match	Date	Opponent	Venue	Result	Attendance	Scorers
1	19 August 1967	Southport	H	4–2	5,877	Rowland, Brace, Morris (2)
2	25 August 1967	Scunthorpe United	A	3–3	6,372	Curry, Knox, Burrows (o.g.)
3	2 September 1967	Oldham Athletic	H	1–1	6,776	Knox
4	5 September 1967	Northampton Town	A	1–1	12,205	Brace
5	9 September 1967	Bristol Rovers	A	0–2	7,317	
6	16 September 1967	Barrow	H	1–2	5,550	Curry
7	23 September 1967	Oxford United	A	0–2	6,565	
8	25 September 1967	Northampton Town	H	3–2	5,506	Knox, Rowlands (2)
9	30 September 1967	Bury	H	1–1	7,398	Rowland
10	2 October 1967	Peterborough United	A	0–2	9,039	
11	7 October 1967	Tranmere Rovers	H	0–3	6,493	
12	13 October 1967	Stockport County	A	0–1	7,936	
13	21 October 1967	Brighton & Hove Albion	H	1–3	5,231	Morris
14	23 October 1967	Peterborough United	H	2–3	5,134	Rowland, Stanton
15	28 October 1967	Shrewsbury Town	A	1–2	5,660	Brace
16	4 November 1967	Swindon Town	H	2–2	4,621	Brace, Rowland
17	11 November 1967	Reading	A	1–2	8,247	Rowland
18	14 November 1967	Oldham Athletic	A	0–1	7,691	
19	18 November 1967	Torquay United	H	2–0	5,295	Rowland, Melling
20	25 November 1967	Grimsby Town	A	0–0	3,263	
21	2 December 1967	Gillingham	H	0–1	5,403	
22	16 December 1967	Southport	A	1–3	4,226	Morris
23	23 December 1967	Scunthorpe United	H	3–0	4,907	Morris, Rowland, Jones
24	26 December 1967	Colchester United	H	2–1	6,679	Jones, Ledger
25	30 December 1967	Colchester United	A	2–1	4,180	Jones (2)
26	20 January 1968	Barrow	A	1–0	6,246	Jones
27	3 February 1968	Oxford United	H	1–0	6,111	Morris
28	10 February 1968	Bury	A	1–3	9,399	Morris
29	17 February 1968	Bournemouth & Boscombe Athletic	H	1–1	6,093	Melling
30	23 February 1968	Tranmere Rovers	A	1–1	7,976	Ledger
31	2 March 1968	Stockport County	H	1–0	6,459	Ledger
32	9 March 1968	Watford	H	1–2	6,629	Edwards
33	11 March 1968	Bristol Rovers	H	3–0	6,377	Melling, Partridge, Coleman
34	16 March 1968	Brighton & Hove Albion	A	0–3	7,756	
35	19 March 1968	Watford	A	2–1	7,324	Sharkey (2)
36	23 March 1968	Shrewsbury Town	H	0–1	6,701	
37	30 March 1968	Swindon Town	A	1–1	10,471	Jones
38	6 April 1968	Reading	H	2–2	5,661	Melling (2)
39	13 April 1968	Torquay United	A	2–0	11,081	Rowlands, Jones
40	15 April 1968	Orient	A	0–0	6,772	
41	16 April 1968	Orient	H	0–0	6,565	
42	20 April 1968	Grimsby Town	H	1–1	6,227	Jones
43	23 April 1968	Walsall	A	1–2	5,598	Ledger
44	27 April 1968	Gillingham	A	1–2	3,928	Williams (o.g.)
45	4 May 1968	Walsall	H	0–3	5,072	
46	11 May 1968	Bournemouth & Boscombe Athletic	A	0–3	4,363	

=== FA Cup ===
Round	Date	Opponent	Venue	Result	Attendance	Scorers
R1	13 December 1967	Tow Law Town	A	1–5	2,508	Melling

=== League Cup ===
Round	Date	Opponent	Venue	Result	Attendance	Scorers
R1	23 August 1967	Lincoln City	A	2–3	5,944	Knox, Mitchinson

== Squad statistics ==
- Squad list sourced from 1967–68 Mansfield Town F.C. season at the English National Football Archive (subscription required)

Pos.	Name	League		FA Cup		League Cup		Total	
Pos.	Name	Apps	Goals	Apps	Goals	Apps	Goals	Apps	Goals
GK	(England) Dave Hollins	41	0	1	0	1	0	43	0
GK	(England) Alan Humphreys	5	0	0	0	0	0	5	0
DF	(England) Stuart Boam	44	0	1	0	0	0	45	0
DF	(England) John Coleman	13	1	0	0	1	0	14	1
DF	(England) Dick Edwards	32	1	1	0	1	0	34	1
DF	(England) Philip Ferns	11(1)	0	0	0	0	0	11(1)	0
DF	(England) Bill McKinney	11(1)	0	0	0	0	0	11(1)	0
DF	(Scotland) Sandy Pate	34	0	1	0	0	0	35	0
DF	(England) Bill Richardson	8(1)	0	0	0	1	0	9(1)	0
DF	(England) Phil Waller	13	0	0	0	0	0	13	0
DF	(England) Bill Williams	4	0	0	0	1	0	5	0
MF	(England) Roger Frude	12	0	1	0	0	0	13	0
MF	(England) Gerry Glover	18(1)	0	0	0	0	0	18(1)	0
MF	(Scotland) Jimmy Goodfellow	12	0	0	0	0	0	12	0
MF	(England) Ian Hall	13	0	0	0	0	0	13	0
MF	(England) Tommy Mitchinson	2	0	0	0	1	1	3	1
MF	(England) Peter Morris	29	7	1	0	1	0	31	7
MF	(Scotland) Tom Stanton	37	1	1	0	0	0	38	1
FW	(England) Stuart Brace	11(1)	4	0	0	1	0	12(1)	4
FW	(England) Bill Curry	5	2	1	0	1	0	7	2
FW	(Wales) Dai Jones	22	8	0	0	0	0	22	8
FW	(Scotland) Thomas Knox	21	3	1	0	1	1	23	4
FW	(England) Bob Ledger	15(2)	4	0	0	0	0	15(2)	4
FW	(England) Terry Melling	27	5	1	1	0	0	28	6
FW	(England) Malcolm Partridge	5	1	0	0	0	0	5	1
FW	(England) Dudley Roberts	6(2)	0	0	0	0	0	6(2)	0
FW	(England) John Rowland	30	7	1	0	1	0	32	7
FW	(England) John Rowlands	12(1)	3	0	0	0	0	12(1)	3
FW	(England) Nick Sharkey	13	2	0	0	0	0	13	2
–	Own goals	–	2	–	0	–	0	–	2
