= 1967–68 Rochdale A.F.C. season =

English football club season

Rochdale
1967–68 season
- Manager: Tony Collins; Bob Stokoe
- League Division Four: 19th
- FA Cup: 1st Round
- League Cup: 1st Round
- Top goalscorer: League: Joe Fletcher; All: Joe Fletcher

The 1967–68 season was Rochdale A.F.C.'s 61st in existence and their 9th consecutive in the Football League Fourth Division.

== Statistics ==
No.	Pos	Nat	Player	Total		Division 4		F.A. Cup		League Cup		Lancashire Cup		Northern Floodlit Cup		Rose Bowl	
No.	Pos	Nat	Player	Apps	Goals	Apps	Goals	Apps	Goals	Apps	Goals	Apps	Goals	Apps	Goals	Apps	Goals
	GK	(England) ENG	Les Green	52	0	44+0	0	1+0	0	1+0	0	3+0	0	2+0	0	1+0	0
	FW	(England) ENG	Steve Melledew	45	8	35+3	7	1+0	0	1+0	0	3+0	0	1+0	1	1+0	0
	DF	(England) ENG	Laurie Calloway	33	1	26+1	1	1+0	0	1+0	0	1+0	0	2+0	0	1+0	0
	FW	(Scotland) SCO	John Reid	45	3	37+2	3	1+0	0	1+0	0	2+0	0	1+0	0	1+0	0
	DF	(England) ENG	Graham Smith	50	0	42+0	0	1+0	0	1+0	0	3+0	0	2+0	0	1+0	0
	DF	(England) ENG	Brian Eastham	16	0	13+0	0	0+0	0	1+0	0	1+0	0	0+0	0	1+0	0
	MF	(England) ENG	Jack Winspear	18	3	15+1	3	0+0	0	0+0	0	1+0	0	0+0	0	1+0	0
	FW	(England) ENG	Billy Russell	34	2	26+1	1	1+0	0	1+0	0	3+0	0	1+0	1	1+0	0
	FW	(England) ENG	Joe Fletcher	46	16	38+0	15	1+0	1	1+0	0	3+0	0	2+0	0	1+0	0
	FW	(England) ENG	Reg Jenkins	49	7	42+0	7	1+0	0	1+0	0	2+0	0	2+0	0	1+0	0
	MF	(England) ENG	Hughen Riley	24	4	17+3	4	0+0	0	1+0	0	2+0	0	0+0	0	1+0	0
	MF	(England) ENG	Brian Taylor	35	0	30+0	0	1+0	0	1+0	0	1+0	0	2+0	0	0+0	0
	DF	(England) ENG	Vic Cockcroft	45	0	42+0	0	1+0	0	0+0	0	1+0	0	1+0	0	0+0	0
	FW	(England) ENG	Barry Hutchinson	31	5	27+0	3	0+0	0	0+0	0	3+0	1	1+0	1	0+0	0
	MF	(England) ENG	David Crompton	8	0	6+2	0	0+0	0	0+0	0	0+0	0	0+0	0	0+0	0
	MF	(Republic of Ireland) IRL	Frank McEwen	10	1	7+0	1	1+0	0	0+0	0	2+0	0	0+0	0	0+0	0
	MF	(England) ENG	Ray Daubney	3	0	1+0	0	0+0	0	0+0	0	1+1	0	0+0	0	0+0	0
	GK	(Scotland) SCO	Bobby Williamson	2	0	2+0	0	0+0	0	0+0	0	0+0	0	0+0	0	0+0	0
	DF	(England) ENG	David Dow	9	0	7+0	0	0+0	0	0+0	0	1+0	0	1+0	0	0+0	0
	MF	(England) ENG	Les Harley	7	0	5+0	0	0+0	0	0+0	0	0+0	0	2+0	0	0+0	0
	MF	(England) ENG	Dennis Butler	16	2	15+0	2	0+0	0	0+0	0	0+0	0	1+0	0	0+0	0
	MF	(England) ENG	Billy Rudd	17	1	16+0	1	0+0	0	0+0	0	0+0	0	1+0	0	0+0	0
	DF	(England) ENG	Ken Bracewell	5	0	5+0	0	0+0	0	0+0	0	0+0	0	0+0	0	0+0	0
	DF	(England) ENG	Ernie Wilkinson	9	0	9+0	0	0+0	0	0+0	0	0+0	0	0+0	0	0+0	0

== Final League Table ==
Pos	Team	Pld	W	D	L	GF	GA	GAv	Pts	Promotion or relegation
17	Notts County	46	15	11	20	53	79	0.671	41	
18	Port Vale	46	12	15	19	61	72	0.847	39 (Note: Due to financial irregularities, Port Vale were initially expelled from the league, but this punishment was later reduced to applying for re-election.)	Re-elected
19	Rochdale	46	12	14	20	51	72	0.708	38	
20	Exeter City	46	11	16	19	45	65	0.692	38	
21	York City	46	11	14	21	65	68	0.956	36	Re-elected

Source: rsssf.com
Rules for classification: 1) points; 2) goal average; 3) number of goals scored.

== Competitions ==
=== Football League Fourth Division ===
19 August 1967 1	Newport County	1–1	Rochdale	Newport
	Melling 46'	Report	Calloway 20'	Stadium: Somerton Park; Attendance: 4858

26 August 1967 2	Rochdale	3–2	York City	Rochdale
	Riley 1', 33'; Fletcher 24'	Report	Provan 32'; Spencer 72'	Stadium: Spotland Stadium; Attendance: 2536

2 September 1967 3	Rochdale	1–2	Lincoln City	Rochdale
	Melledew 65'	Report	Ford 35', 43'	Stadium: Spotland Stadium; Attendance: 2467

4 September 1967 4	Hartlepools United	1–1	Rochdale	Hartlepool
	McGovern	Report	Fletcher	Stadium: Victoria Park; Attendance: 8361

9 September 1967 5	Brentford	4–0	Rochdale	Brentford
	Ross 4'; Docherty 22'; Lawther 45'; Melledew 78' (o.g.)	Report		Stadium: Griffin Park; Attendance: 5646

16 September 1967 6	Rochdale	1–1	Bradford Park Avenue	Rochdale
	Fletcher 58'	Report	Ham 38'	Stadium: Spotland Stadium; Attendance: 2579

23 September 1967 7	Doncaster Rovers	2–0	Rochdale	Doncaster
	Gilfillan 11'; Jeffrey 27' (pen.)	Report		Stadium: Belle Vue; Attendance: 6530

25 September 1967 8	Rochdale	1–1	Hartlepools United	Rochdale
	Winspear	Report	Bell	Stadium: Spotland Stadium; Attendance: 2041

30 September 1967 9	Rochdale	2–2	Luton Town	Rochdale
	Winspear 38'; Jenkins 65'	Report	Buxton 26'; Rioch 32'	Stadium: Spotland Stadium; Attendance: 1884

3 October 1967 10	Barnsley	1–1	Rochdale	Barnsley
	Bettany	Report	Fletcher	Stadium: Oakwell; Attendance: 4663

7 October 1967 11	Bradford City	0–0	Rochdale	Bradford
		Report		Stadium: Valley Parade; Attendance: 5174

14 October 1967 12	Rochdale	1–1	Crewe Alexandra	Rochdale
	Winspear 89'	Report	Talbot 56'	Stadium: Spotland Stadium; Attendance: 2397

21 October 1967 13	Notts County	2–0	Rochdale	Nottingham
	Elliott 45'; Bradd 83'	Report		Stadium: Meadow Lane; Attendance: 5832

23 October 1967 14	Rochdale	1–0	Barnsley	Rochdale
	Fletcher	Report		Stadium: Spotland Stadium; Attendance: 3368

28 October 1967 15	Rochdale	3–1	Port Vale	Rochdale
	Hutchinson 52'; Reid 70'; Jenkins 78' (pen.)	Report	Chapman 24'	Stadium: Spotland Stadium; Attendance: 2566

4 November 1967 16	Chester	0–1	Rochdale	Chester
		Report	Melledew 81'	Stadium: Sealand Road; Attendance: 4068

11 November 1967 17	Rochdale	1–4	Chesterfield	Rochdale
	Jenkins 44'	Report	Hollett 55'; Randall 56', 70' (pen.); Moore 83'	Stadium: Spotland Stadium; Attendance: 2391

18 November 1967 18	Exeter City	3–1	Rochdale	Exeter
	Curtis 10'; Banks 11', 65'	Report	Jenkins 79'	Stadium: St James Park; Attendance: 4072

25 November 1967 19	Rochdale	1–0	Darlington	Rochdale
	Jenkins 81'	Report		Stadium: Spotland Stadium; Attendance: 1692

2 December 1967 20	Aldershot	2–1	Rochdale	Aldershot
	Howarth 16'; Burton 62'	Report	Fletcher 82'	Stadium: Recreation Ground; Attendance: 4687

16 December 1967 21	Rochdale	4–3	Newport County	Rochdale
	Reid 9', 80'; Fletcher 17'; Melledew 62'	Report	Hill 25' (pen.); Buck 29'; Robinson 47'	Stadium: Spotland Stadium; Attendance: 1662

23 December 1967 22	York City	4–1	Rochdale	York
	Jenkins 10' (o.g.); MacDougall 16', 46'; Provan 23'	Report	Russell 34'	Stadium: Bootham Crescent; Attendance: 3329

26 December 1967 23	Wrexham	2–0	Rochdale	Wrexham
	Beanland; Weston	Report		Stadium: Racecourse Ground; Attendance: 9767

30 December 1967 24	Rochdale	3–0	Wrexham	Rochdale
	Showell 30' (o.g.); Jenkins 40' (pen.); Hutchinson 73'	Report		Stadium: Spotland Stadium; Attendance: 1799

6 January 1968 25	Lincoln City	3–2	Rochdale	Lincoln
	Holmes 36'; Grummett 55', 67'	Report	Peden 80' (o.g.); McEwen 88'	Stadium: Sincil Bank; Attendance: 5480

20 January 1968 26	Bradford Park Avenue	0–0	Rochdale	Bradford
		Report		Stadium: Park Avenue; Attendance: 3334

27 January 1968 27	Rochdale	1–3	Workington	Rochdale
	Fletcher 75'	Report	Tinnion 47'; McLean 54'; Spratt 78'	Stadium: Spotland Stadium; Attendance: 1606

3 February 1968 28	Rochdale	2–0	Doncaster Rovers	Rochdale
	Melledew 53'; Fletcher 75'	Report		Stadium: Spotland Stadium; Attendance: 1728

10 February 1968 29	Luton Town	4–1	Rochdale	Luton
	Rioch 14'; Allen 24'; Buxton 38'; Branston 42'	Report	Fletcher 23'	Stadium: Kenilworth Road; Attendance: 10040

17 February 1968 30	Rochdale	0–1	Southend United	Rochdale
		Report	McKinven 12'	Stadium: Spotland Stadium; Attendance: 2370

24 February 1968 31	Rochdale	2–2	Exeter City	Rochdale
	Melledew 62'; Rudd 75'	Report	Blain 29'; Corr 82'	Stadium: Spotland Stadium; Attendance: 2159

2 March 1968 32	Crewe Alexandra	2–1	Rochdale	Crewe
	Smith 65' (o.g.); Tarbuck	Report	Fletcher 44'	Stadium: Gresty Road; Attendance: 4570

9 March 1968 33	Halifax Town	2–0	Rochdale	Halifax
	Massie 71'; McCarthy 80'	Report		Stadium: The Shay; Attendance: 4933

16 March 1968 34	Rochdale	0–0	Notts County	Rochdale
		Report		Stadium: Spotland Stadium; Attendance: 1895

18 March 1968 35	Rochdale	1–1	Brentford	Rochdale
	Melledew 90'	Report	Cockcroft 21' (o.g.)	Stadium: Spotland Stadium; Attendance: 1725

23 March 1968 36	Port Vale	1–1	Rochdale	Stoke-on-Trent
	Chapman 34'	Report	Butler 65'	Stadium: Old Recreation Ground; Attendance: 3151

30 March 1968 37	Rochdale	1–1	Chester	Rochdale
	Fletcher 64'	Report	Loyden 20'	Stadium: Spotland Stadium; Attendance: 2212

6 April 1968 38	Chesterfield	0–2	Rochdale	Chesterfield
		Report	Fletcher 19'; Kettleborough 71' (o.g.)	Stadium: Saltergate Recreation Ground; Attendance: 7159

13 April 1968 39	Rochdale	3–2	Bradford City	Rochdale
	Fletcher 26', 86'; Hutchinson 71'	Report	Leighton 58'; Bannister 70'	Stadium: Spotland Stadium; Attendance: 4625

15 April 1968 40	Rochdale	1–2	Swansea Town	Rochdale
	Jenkins (pen.)	Report	Raybould; Williams	Stadium: Spotland Stadium; Attendance: 3076

16 April 1968 41	Swansea Town	1–0	Rochdale	Swansea
	Todd 84'	Report		Stadium: Vetch Field; Attendance: 4978

20 April 1968 42	Darlington	2–0	Rochdale	Darlington
	L. O'Neill 48'; J. O'Neill 59'	Report		Stadium: Feethams; Attendance: 3241

27 April 1968 43	Rochdale	0–2	Aldershot	Rochdale
		Report	Howarth 63'; Gowans 83'	Stadium: Spotland Stadium; Attendance: 2001

29 April 1968 44	Rochdale	2–1	Halifax Town	Rochdale
	Melledew; Riley	Report	Morris	Stadium: Spotland Stadium; Attendance: 1929

4 May 1968 45	Workington	0–1	Rochdale	Workington
		Report	Butler 49'	Stadium: Borough Park; Attendance: 1405

10 May 1968 46	Southend United	3–1	Rochdale	Southend-on-Sea
	Chisnall 5'; Best 40', 68'	Report	Riley 61'	Stadium: Roots Hall; Attendance: 5744

=== F.A. Cup ===
9 December 1967 1	Tranmere Rovers	5–1	Rochdale	Birkenhead
	Williams 49'; Hudson 51', 69', 74'; Yardley 71'	Report	Fletcher 55'	Stadium: Prenton Park; Attendance: 4500

=== League Cup ===
23 August 1967 1	Rochdale	0–1	Bury	Rochdale
		Report	Lindsay	Stadium: Spotland Stadium; Attendance: 4848

=== Lancashire Cup ===
31 October 1967	Rochdale	1–1	Manchester United	Rochdale
	Hutchinson		Goal	Stadium: Spotland Stadium; Attendance: 1981

22 November 1967 Abandoned	Manchester United	1–0	Rochdale	Manchester
	Goal			Stadium: Old Trafford

15 January 1968	Manchester United	7–0	Rochdale	Manchester
	Goal			Stadium: Old Trafford; Attendance: 5267

=== Northern Floodlit Cup ===
13 February 1968	Wigan Athletic	3–2	Rochdale	Wigan
	Goal		Russell; Hutchinson	Stadium: Springfield Park; Attendance: 654

26 February 1968	Rochdale	1–1	Wigan Athletic	Rochdale
	Melledew		Goal	Stadium: Spotland Stadium; Attendance: 1146

=== Rose Bowl ===
Rochdale	1–1	Oldham Athletic	Rochdale
Lawson (o.g.)		Goal	Stadium: Spotland Stadium; Attendance: 2548
