= Hughen Riley =

English footballer (1947–2025)

Personal information
- Full name: Hughen William Riley
- Date of birth: 12 June 1947
- Place of birth: Accrington, England
- Date of death: 19 February 2025 (aged 77)
- Place of death: Salisbury, England
- Position: Midfielder

Senior career*
Years	Team	Apps	(Gls)
1967–1971	Rochdale	92	(12)
1971–1974	Crewe Alexandra	121	(9)
1974–1976	Bury	51	(3)
1976–1978	Bournemouth	72	(8)
1978	Dorchester Town		
1979	Weymouth		
Total		336	(32)
- * Club domestic league appearances and goals

Hughen William Riley (12 June 1947 – 19 February 2025) was an English footballer who played as a midfielder for Rochdale, Crewe Alexandra, Bury and Bournemouth.

== Career statistics ==
Appearances and goals by club, season and competition
Club	Season	League			FA Cup		Other		Total	
Club	Season	Division	Apps	Goals	Apps	Goals	Apps	Goals	Apps	Goals
Rochdale	1967–68	Division 4	20	4	0	0	1	0	21	4
Rochdale	1968–69	Division 4	1	0	0	0	0	0	1	0
Rochdale	1969–70	Division 3	24	4	0	0	0	0	24	4
Rochdale	1970–71	Division 3	42	4	5	0	3	0	50	4
Rochdale	1971–72	Division 3	5	0	0	0	0	0	5	0
Rochdale	Total		92	12	5	0	4	0	101	0
Crewe Alexandra	1971–72	Division 4	24	2	0	0	0	0	24	2
Crewe Alexandra	1972–73	Division 4	42	2	3	0	1	0	46	2
Crewe Alexandra	1973–74	Division 4	41	4	2	0	1	0	44	4
Crewe Alexandra	1974–75	Division 4	14	1	0	0	4	1	18	2
Crewe Alexandra	Total		121	9	5	0	6	1	132	10
Bury	1974–75	Division 3	27	2	7	1	0	0	34	3
Bury	1975–76	Division 3	24	1	3	1	2	0	29	2
Bury	Total		51	3	10	2	2	0	63	5
Bournemouth	1976–77	Division 4	42	6	2	0	2	0	46	6
Bournemouth	1977–78	Division 4	30	2	2	0	3	0	35	2
Bournemouth	Total		72	8	4	0	5	0	81	8
Career total			336	32	24	2	17	1	377	35
