= John Rowland (footballer, born 1941) =

English footballer (1941–2020)

Personal information
- Full name: John Douglas Rowland
- Date of birth: 7 April 1941
- Place of birth: Riddings, Alfreton, England
- Date of death: November 2020 (aged 79)
- Place of death: Derby, England
- Positions: Forward; winger

Youth career
- Ironville Amateurs

Senior career*
Years	Team	Apps	(Gls)
1960–1962	Nottingham Forest	26	(3)
1962–1966	Port Vale	149	(40)
1966–1968	Mansfield Town	49	(16)
1968–1969	Tranmere Rovers	26	(3)
1969–1972	Derry City		
1972–197?	South Shields		
197?–197?	Linfield		
197?–197?	Coleraine		
197?–197?	South Shields		
Total		250+	(62+)

International career
- England Youth
- * Club domestic league appearances and goals

John Douglas Rowland (7 April 1941 – November 2020) was an English footballer who was known for his powerful 'hammer shot'. A forward, he scored 62 goals in 250 league games in a nine-year career in the Football League.

He began his career at Nottingham Forest in 1960 before being sold to Port Vale for £6,000 in August 1962. In September 1966, he was sold to Mansfield Town for £6,500. Two years later, he joined Tranmere Rovers before going into Northern Irish and non-League football with Derry City, South Shields, Linfield and Coleraine. Port Vale announced his death on 20 November 2020.

== Career ==
=== Nottingham Forest ===
Rowland played for Ironville Amateurs before joining First Division side Nottingham Forest in 1960. He played 26 league games under Andy Beattie in 1960–61 and 1961–62, scoring three goals. He also represented England youth level. However, he fell out with Beattie after questioning the manager's tactical ability.

=== Port Vale ===
Rowland was signed by Port Vale manager Norman Low for £6,000 in August 1962. Low was quickly replaced by Freddie Steele, and Rowland took a while to blend into the team, though he scored seven goals in 41 games in 1962–63. He scored just four goals in 28 games in the 1963–64 campaign and played in the FA Cup victory over Birmingham City and 0–0 draw with Liverpool at Anfield. He found his form by September 1964, and hit five goals in 43 games in 1964–65 under new manager Jackie Mudie, though this was not enough to prevent the "Valiants" slipping into the Fourth Division.

He was then moved from right-wing to centre-forward and scored 23 goals in 46 games in the 1965–66 season to become the club's top scorer; he managed to equal Basil Hayward's club record of scoring in eight consecutive games from 1 September to 4 October. In September 1966, he was sold to Tommy Cummings' Mansfield Town for £6,500. He had made 166 appearances (149 in the league) and scored 43 goals (40 in the league) for the Vale. He was happy to stay at Vale Park, but Vale director Tommy Talbot advised him to make the move as the club were desperately short of funds.

=== Later career ===
The "Stags" finished ninth in the Third Division in 1966–67, though they only avoided relegation in 1967–68 under Tommy Eggleston after Peterborough United were hit with a 19-point deduction. In two seasons at Field Mill, Rowland made 53 appearances in all competitions, scoring 16 goals. He played for Tranmere Rovers in 1968–69, playing 26 league games and scoring three goals under Dave Russell's stewardship. However, he did not enjoy his time at Tranmere playing on the slanted Prenton Park pitch. He turned out for Derry City after being recruited by former Port Vale teammate Jimmy Hill. He left Derry after the club quit the Irish League during The Troubles. He then dropped into non-League football with Northern Premier League side South Shields, whilst working as a sales representative for Ben Sherman. He later played for Linfield and Coleraine, before returning to South Shields. After leaving Ben Sherman, he went on to work for Rolls-Royce in Derby.

== Style of play ==
Rowland could play as a forward or winger and was able to kick with either foot. He was noted for his powerful shooting. One of his shots was so powerful as to break the wrist of a player.

== Career statistics ==
Appearances and goals by club, season and competition
Club	Season	League			FA Cup		League Cup		Total	
Club	Season	Division	Apps	Goals	Apps	Goals	Apps	Goals	Apps	Goals
Nottingham Forest	1960–61	First Division	12	1	0	0	2	0	14	1
Nottingham Forest	1961–62	First Division	14	2	0	0	1	0	15	2
Nottingham Forest	Total		26	3	0	0	3	0	29	3
Port Vale	1962–63	Third Division	37	7	4	0	0	0	41	7
Port Vale	1963–64	Third Division	23	4	4	0	1	0	28	4
Port Vale	1964–65	Third Division	40	5	2	0	1	0	43	5
Port Vale	1965–66	Fourth Division	42	21	2	1	2	1	46	23
Port Vale	1966–67	Fourth Division	7	3	0	0	1	1	8	4
Port Vale	Total		149	40	12	1	5	2	166	43
Mansfield Town	1966–67	Third Division	19	9	2	0	0	0	21	9
Mansfield Town	1967–68	Third Division	30	7	1	0	1	0	32	7
Mansfield Town	Total		49	16	3	0	1	0	53	16
Tranmere Rovers	1968–69	Second Division	26	3	0	0	2	0	28	3
Career total			250	62	15	1	11	2	276	65
