= Bobby Downes (footballer) =

English footballer, coach, and manager

Personal information
- Full name: Robert David Downes
- Date of birth: 18 August 1949 (age 77)
- Place of birth: Bloxwich, Staffordshire, England
- Height: 5 ft 10 in (1.78 m)
- Positions: Left-back; left winger

Youth career
- West Bromwich Albion

Senior career*
Years	Team	Apps	(Gls)
1966–1967	West Bromwich Albion	0	(0)
1967–1969	Peterborough United	26	(3)
1969–1974	Rochdale	174	(10)
1974–1980	Watford	199	(18)
1980–1982	Barnsley	43	(1)
1982–1984	Blackpool	28	(3)
Total		470	(35)
- * Club domestic league appearances and goals

Robert David Downes (born 18 August 1949) is an English former footballer, coach and manager. He started his playing career as a left-back, later becoming a left-winger. After starting his career at West Bromwich Albion, Downes played 470 games in the Football League for Peterborough United, Rochdale, Watford, Barnsley and Blackpool. He won the Fourth Division title with Watford in 1977–78. He later worked as a coach at Blackpool, Aston Villa, Port Vale, Wolverhampton Wanderers, Watford, and Blackburn Rovers, before being appointed Head of Recruitment at Nottingham Forest in February 2013.

== Playing career ==
Born in Bloxwich, Staffordshire, Downes started his career as an apprentice at West Brom. He turned professional in 1966 but joined Peterborough United the following year, failing to make a league appearance. After two seasons as a squad player at Peterborough, he joined newly-promoted Rochdale at the end of the 1968–69 season. He was a first-team regular at Rochdale, as they managed to stay in the Football League Third Division for five consecutive seasons. Following their relegation in 1974, he transferred to Watford for a fee of £10,000. Downes missed just three games in his debut season at Vicarage Road. Still, Watford were relegated to the Fourth Division at the end of 1974–75 and were unable to obtain promotion in the following two campaigns.

Mike Keen was replaced as manager by Graham Taylor in June 1977. Taylor decided that Downes, who had previously spent much of his career at left-back, should play further up the field; Downes was ever-present on the left-wing in the 1977–78 season, scoring ten goals in all competitions as Watford won promotion as champions of the Fourth Division. He faced increased competition in 1978–79, but made 46 appearances as Watford secured a second consecutive promotion and reached the semi-finals of the League Cup. However, Downes only managed 10 Watford appearances in 1979–80, and was sold to Barnsley for £10,000 in March 1980, playing a part in Barnsley's improved form at the end of that season.

After two years at Barnsley, he joined Blackpool on a free transfer in 1982. After two years as a player-coach for the Tangerines, he retired from playing in 1984.

== Coaching career ==
In June 1987, newly appointed Aston Villa manager Graham Taylor appointed Downes as a youth coach. He remained there until 1991 before taking up the same role at Port Vale in July of that year. He was upgraded to the position of first-team coach in March 1992. He was again signed by Taylor in June 1994, this time as assistant manager at Wolverhampton Wanderers. Following Taylor's dismissal in November 1995, Downes briefly served as caretaker manager. Wolves won two and drew one of Downes' six matches in charge. Taylor signed Downes for a third time in June 1996 as Watford's youth football director.

Downes left Watford in May 1997 to take up a similar position at Premier League side Blackburn Rovers. Players to go through the academy during Downes' tenure included England international David Dunn, as well as future Watford player Martin Taylor. He left the position in July 2009 by mutual consent. Following this he took up a scouting role at Preston North End.

In February 2013, he was appointed as the Head of Recruitment at Nottingham Forest. He left the club in March 2014 and went on to scout for Preston North End, Derby County, Aston Villa and Sheffield Wednesday.

== Personal life ==
Downes' son, David, was appointed sporting director at Blackpool in June 2023. He previously worked for Sheffield Wednesday.

== Career statistics ==
Appearances and goals by club, season and competition
Club	Season	League			FA Cup		Other^{[A]}		Total	
Club	Season	Division	Apps	Goals	Apps	Goals	Apps	Goals	Apps	Goals
West Bromwich Albion	1966–67	First Division	0	0	0	0	0	0	0	0
Peterborough United	1967–68	Third Division	12	2	0	0	0	0	12	2
Peterborough United	1968–69	Fourth Division	14	1	1	1	0	0	15	2
Peterborough United	Total		26	3	1	1	0	0	27	4
Rochdale	1969–70	Third Division	30	4	1	0	0	0	31	4
Rochdale	1970–71	Third Division	37	0	5	1	2	0	44	1
Rochdale	1971–72	Third Division	36	1	0	0	3	0	39	1
Rochdale	1972–73	Third Division	29	1	0	0	2	0	31	1
Rochdale	1973–74	Third Division	42	4	3	1	2	0	47	5
Rochdale	Total		174	10	9	2	9	0	192	12
Watford	1974–75	Third Division	43	3	1	0	2	0	46	3
Watford	1975–76	Fourth Division	30	2	0	0	3	1	33	3
Watford	1976–77	Fourth Division	35	2	3	0	3	0	41	2
Watford	1977–78	Fourth Division	46	9	3	0	5	1	54	10
Watford	1978–79	Third Division	37	2	2	0	7	2	46	4
Watford	1979–80	Second Division	8	0	0	0	2	0	10	0
Watford	Total		199	18	9	0	22	4	230	22
Barnsley	1979–80	Third Division	13	0	0	0	0	0	13	0
Barnsley	1980–81	Third Division	30	1	6	0	6	0	42	1
Barnsley	Total		43	1	6	0	6	0	55	1
Blackpool	1982–83	Fourth Division	27	3	2	0	4	1	33	4
Blackpool	1983–84	Fourth Division	1	0	1	0	0	0	2	0
Blackpool	Total		28	3	3	0	4	1	35	4
Career total			470	35	28	3	41	5	539	43

A. The "Other" column constitutes appearances and goals in the League Cup, Football League Trophy, English Football League play-offs and Full Members' Cup.

== Honours ==
Watford

- Football League Fourth Division: 1977–78
