= Allan Wilson (footballer, born 1945) =

Scottish footballer

Personal information
- Full name: Allan Armstrong Wilson
- Date of birth: 10 January 1945 (age 81)
- Place of birth: Bathgate, Scotland
- Position: Goalkeeper

Senior career*
Years	Team	Apps	(Gls)
1963–1964	Partick Thistle		
1964–1966	Scunthorpe United		(0)
1966–1967	Mansfield Town	35	(0)
1974-1975	Meadowbank Thistle	25	(0)
Total		8	(0)
- * Club domestic league appearances and goals

Allan Armstrong Wilson (born 10 January 1945) is a Scottish former professional footballer who played in the Football League for Mansfield Town.
