= Tom Stanton (footballer) =

Scottish footballer

Personal information
- Full name: Thomas Stanton
- Date of birth: 3 May 1948 (age 78)
- Place of birth: Glasgow, Scotland
- Positions: Full back; midfielder

Senior career*
Years	Team	Apps	(Gls)
1965–1966	Liverpool	0	(0)
1966–1967	Arsenal	0	(0)
1967–1968	Mansfield Town	37	(1)
1968–1976	Bristol Rovers	168	(7)
1976–1977	Weymouth		
1977–1980	Forest Green Rovers		
1982–1983	Clevedon Town		
Total		205	(8)

Managerial career
- 1982–1983: Clevedon Town
- * Club domestic league appearances and goals

Thomas Stanton (born 3 May 1948 in Glasgow) is a former professional footballer who played as a full back and a midfielder in The Football League between 1967 and 1976.

Stanton started out playing junior football for Liverpool before turning professional in 1965. After a year with their senior squad without playing a League match he moved to Arsenal in September 1966, with whom he again failed to play in a League game. He eventually made his League debut after joining Mansfield Town in 1967, and went on to play 37 times for them before joining Bristol Rovers in June 1968.

In eight seasons with Bristol Rovers he made 168 League appearances, eleven of those as a substitute, and scored seven times, before dropping down into non-League football in 1976 when he joined Weymouth. In 1977, he joined Forest Green Rovers as a player-coach, and in 1980 returned to Bristol Rovers as reserve team coach. Another stint as a player-coach followed in 1982, this time with Clevedon Town, and he was later appointed their manager. He returned for a third spell with Bristol Rovers in 1983, where he spent a year coaching their schoolboy teams.

Following his retirement from football, Stanton started up an antiques business in the Clifton area of Bristol.
