= Jimmy McGeorge =

English footballer

Personal information
- Full name: James Lumley McGeorge
- Date of birth: 8 June 1945 (age 81)
- Place of birth: Sunderland, England
- Position: Winger

Senior career*
Years	Team	Apps	(Gls)
1963–1964	Spennymoor United		
1964–1966	Leyton Orient	16	(0)
1966–1967	Mansfield Town	10	(0)
1967-1968	Cambridge City	21	(5)
Total		26	(0)
- * Club domestic league appearances and goals

James Lumley McGeorge (born 8 June 1945) is an English former professional footballer who played in the Football League for Leyton Orient and Mansfield Town.
