= Tommy Henderson (footballer, born 1949) =

English footballer

Personal information
- Full name: Thomas Henderson
- Date of birth: 6 April 1949 (age 77)
- Place of birth: Consett, County Durham, England
- Height: 5 ft 8 in (1.73 m)
- Position: Winger

Senior career*
Years	Team	Apps	(Gls)
–1969	Tow Law Town		
1969–1970	Bradford Park Avenue	22	(3)
1970–1972	York City	64	(7)
1972–	Bradford Park Avenue		
- Dartford
1976–1979	Weymouth		(47)
- Bridport
Total		86	(57)
- * Club domestic league appearances and goals

Thomas Henderson (born 6 April 1949) is an English former professional footballer who played as a winger in the Football League for Bradford Park Avenue and York City and in non-League football for Tow Law Town, Bradford Park Avenue, Dartford, Weymouth and Bridport.
