= Clive Ford =

English footballer

Personal information
- Date of birth: 10 April 1945 (age 81)
- Place of birth: Hateley Heath, England
- Position: Forward

Youth career
- 1961–1964: Wolverhampton Wanderers

Senior career*
Years	Team	Apps	(Gls)
1964	Wolverhampton Wanderers	2	(0)
1964–1967	Walsall	14	(0)
1967–1968	Lincoln City	49	(16)
1968	Los Angeles Wolves	11	(3)
1968–19xx	Cambridge City	?	(?)
Total		76	(19)
- * Club domestic league appearances and goals

Clive Ford (born 10 April 1945) is an English former professional footballer who played as a forward.

== Career ==
Born in Hateley Heath, Ford began as an apprentice at Wolverhampton Wanderers, turning professional in 1964. He later played in the Football League for Walsall and Lincoln City, before playing in the North American Soccer League with the Los Angeles Wolves. Ford returned to the UK after one season to play non-League football with Cambridge City.
