= Barry Wagstaff =

English footballer

Barry Wagstaff (born 26 November 1945 - 11 August 2023) is a former professional footballer with Sheffield United, Reading and Rotherham United.

Wagstaff was a defensive midfield player with Sheffield United from June 1963 until July 1969. He played for Reading until March 1975 when he joined Rotherham United, for whom he played until 1977.

Wagstaff died August 11, 2023.
