= Neil Burns (footballer) =

Scottish footballer

Personal information
- Full name: Neil James Burns
- Date of birth: 11 June 1945 (age 81)
- Place of birth: Bellshill, Scotland
- Position: Winger

Senior career*
Years	Team	Apps	(Gls)
1963–1964	Crewe Alexandra	0	(0)
1964–1965	Bethesda Athletic		
1965–1967	Mansfield Town	10	(0)
1967–1975	Corby Town		
1975–1977	Rushden Town		
1977–1979	Desborough Town		
1979–1981	Rothwell Town		
1981–1983	Corby Town		
1983	Cottingham		
Total		10	(0)
- * Club domestic league appearances and goals

Neil James Burns (born 11 June 1945) is a Scottish former professional footballer who played in the Football League for Mansfield Town.
