= Franco Derko =

Italian footballer

Personal information
- Full name: Tadeusz Franciszek Derko
- Date of birth: 22 December 1946 (age 79)
- Place of birth: Italy
- Position: Centre half

Senior career*
| Years | Team | Apps | (Gls) |
| 1966–1967 | Mansfield Town | 1 | (0) |
| Total | | 1 | (0) |
- * Club domestic league appearances and goals

Tadeusz Franciszek Derko (born 24 December 1946) is a former Italian professional footballer who played in the Football League for Mansfield Town.
