= Tony Beanland =

English footballer

Personal information
- Full name: Anthony Beanland
- Date of birth: 11 January 1944 (age 82)
- Place of birth: Bradford, West Riding of Yorkshire, England
- Position: Defender

Youth career
- Blackpool

Senior career*
Years	Team	Apps	(Gls)
1962	Blackpool	0	(0)
1962–1966	Southport	143	(3)
1966–1967	Southend United	57	(3)
1967–1969	Wrexham	84	(5)
1969–1970	Bradford Park Avenue	31	(1)
- Kirkby Town
- * Club domestic league appearances and goals

Anthony Beanland (born 11 January 1944) is an English former professional footballer who played as a defender. He made appearances in the English Football League for Southport, Southend United, Wrexham and Bradford Park Avenue.
