= John Oldham (footballer) =

English footballer

Personal information
- Full name: John Oldham
- Date of birth: 24 October 1949 (age 77)
- Place of birth: Nottingham, England
- Position: Inside forward

Senior career*
Years	Team	Apps	(Gls)
1965–1966	Nuthall Boys Club		
1966–1967	Mansfield Town	1	(0)
1967	Arnold		
Total		1	(0)
- * Club domestic league appearances and goals

John Oldham (born 24 October 1949) is an English former professional footballer who played in the Football League for Mansfield Town.
