= Vince Radcliffe =

English footballer

Personal information
- Date of birth: 9 June 1945
- Place of birth: Manchester, England
- Date of death: 10 March 2014 (aged 68)
- Place of death: Perth, Australia
- Position: Defender

Senior career*
Years	Team	Apps	(Gls)
1963–1967	Portsmouth	10	(0)
1967–1968	Peterborough United	2	(0)
1968–1969	Rochdale	26	(1)
1969–1971	King's Lynn		
1974	Western Suburbs	23	(0)
Total		61	(1)
- * Club domestic league appearances and goals

Vince Radcliffe (9 June 1945 – 10 March 2014) was an English professional footballer who played as a defender.

== Career ==
Born in Manchester, Radcliffe played in England and Australia for Portsmouth, Peterborough United, Rochdale, King's Lynn and Western Suburbs.

== Later life and death ==
Following a long illness, Radcliffe died in Perth on 10 March 2014, at the age of 68.
