= Glen Andrews (footballer) =

English footballer

Personal information
- Full name: Glendon Andrews
- Date of birth: 11 February 1945 (age 81)
- Place of birth: Dudley, England
- Positions: Forward; right back

Senior career*
Years	Team	Apps	(Gls)
1963–1966	Manchester United	0	(0)
1966–1967	Wolverhampton Wanderers	0	(0)
1967–1969	Bradford (Park Avenue)	48	(6)
- Chelmsford City
- * Club domestic league appearances and goals

Glendon Andrews (born 11 February 1945) is an English former professional footballer who played as a right back and forward in the Football League for Bradford (Park Avenue).
