= Dave Tennant =

English footballer

Personal information
- Full name: David Tennant
- Date of birth: 13 June 1945 (age 81)
- Place of birth: Walsall, Staffordshire, England
- Position: Goalkeeper

Youth career
- –: Walsall

Senior career*
Years	Team	Apps	(Gls)
1963–1965	Walsall	19	(0)
1965–1966	Worcester City		
1966–1970	Lincoln City	40	(0)
1970–1971	Rochdale	16	(0)
1971–197?	Corby Town		
- Skegness Town
- * Club domestic league appearances and goals

David Tennant (born 13 June 1945) is an English former footballer who made 75 appearances in the Football League playing as a goalkeeper for Walsall, Lincoln City and Rochdale. He also played non-league football for Worcester City, Corby Town and Skegness Town.
