= Philip Ferns =

English footballer

Philip Ferns (14 November 1937 – 25 August 2007) was an English footballer who played as a wing half in the Football League.
