= Bill McKinney (footballer) =

English footballer (1936–2025)

Personal information
- Full name: William McKinney
- Date of birth: 20 July 1936
- Place of birth: Newcastle upon Tyne, England
- Date of death: 10 June 2025 (aged 88)
- Position: Right-back

Senior career*
Years	Team	Apps	(Gls)
1954	Wallsend Rising Sun		
1955–1956	Wallsend St Luke's		
1956–1965	Newcastle United	85	(6)
1965–1966	Bournemouth & Boscombe Athletic	17	(0)
1966–1968	Mansfield Town	52	(2)
1968	Wellington Town		
Total		154	(8)
- * Club domestic league appearances and goals

William McKinney (20 July 1936 – 10 June 2025) was an English professional footballer who played as a right-back in the Football League for Bournemouth & Boscombe Athletic, Mansfield Town and Newcastle United.

== Career ==
McKinney served his apprenticeship as a plater at Swan Hunter Shipyard, playing junior football for both Wallsend Rising Sun and Wallsend St. Lukes.

Called up for national service in the army, McKinney was selected for their national XI and after returning to Tyneside joined Newcastle United.

Losing out to fellow new arrival Dick Keith in his first season at Gallowgate, McKinney had to wait until December 1957 for his first team chance, in a 3–3 draw away to Spurs.

Finally becoming a first team regular in the relegation season of 1960–61, McKinney stayed in and around the first team for the following three seasons as unsuccessful promotion challenges were mounted.

Replaced by David Craig in the closing weeks of the 1963–64 season, McKinney featured just twice the following season before joining Bournemouth & Boscombe Athletic at a cost of £2,750 in August 1965, by then struggling with a nagging Achilles injury.

McKinney moved again a year later to fellow Third Division side Mansfield Town and played on at Field Mill for another two seasons.

Joining Southern Premier League side Wellington Town (who later renamed themselves Telford United), McKinney settled in the Shropshire town of Dawley and remained there after his retirement.

== Death ==
McKinney died on 10 June 2025, at the age of 88.
