= Rod Jones (English footballer) =

English footballer

Personal information
- Full name: Rodney Ernest Jones
- Date of birth: 23 September 1945 (age 81)
- Place of birth: Manchester, England
- Position: Goalkeeper

Senior career*
Years	Team	Apps	(Gls)
1965–1967	Rotherham United	36	(0)
1967–1971	Burnley	9	(0)
1971–1973	Rochdale	19	(0)
1975–1976	Barrow	24	(0)
1976–1977	Mossley	13	(0)
- * Club domestic league appearances and goals

Rodney Ernest Jones (born 23 September 1945) is an English retired professional footballer who played as a goalkeeper.
