= John Coleman (footballer, born 1946) =

English footballer

Personal information
- Full name: John Henry Coleman
- Date of birth: 3 March 1946 (age 80)
- Place of birth: Hucknall, Nottinghamshire England
- Height: 5 ft 7 in (1.70 m)
- Positions: Full-back; half-back

Youth career
- 1961–1963: Nottingham Forest

Senior career*
Years	Team	Apps	(Gls)
1963–1966	Nottingham Forest	0	(0)
1966–1968	Mansfield Town	43	(1)
1968–1969	York City	11	(3)
1969–????	Ilkeston Town		
Total		54	(4)
- * Club domestic league appearances and goals

John Henry Coleman (born 3 March 1946) is an English former professional footballer who played as a full-back or as a half-back in the Football League for Mansfield Town and York City, in non-League football for Ilkeston Town, and was on the books of Nottingham Forest without making a league appearance.
