= Peter Middleton (footballer) =

English footballer

Personal information
- Full name: Peter Watson Middleton
- Date of birth: 13 September 1948
- Place of birth: Rawmarsh, England
- Date of death: April 1977 (aged 28)
- Place of death: Braithwell, England
- Position: Midfielder

Youth career
- Sheffield Wednesday

Senior career*
Years	Team	Apps	(Gls)
1965–1968	Sheffield Wednesday	0	(0)
1968–1972	Bradford City	131	(25)
1972	Plymouth Argyle	1	(1)
Total		132	(26)
- * Club domestic league appearances and goals

Peter Watson Middleton (13 September 1948 – April 1977) was an English professional footballer who played as a midfielder. He spent almost all of his career with Bradford City. His career was cut short following an accident just days after his Plymouth Argyle debut.

He was one of eight children, including four boys, born in Rawmarsh, Yorkshire, England. One of his brothers, John, also played for Bradford City.

He was found dead in his car in 1977.

== Career ==
Middleton was a schoolboy with Sheffield Wednesday who signed as an apprentice professional. He became a regular in the reserves, signing as a full-time player in 1965. But after three years without a first team game he moved to Bradford City.

Bradford City paid £500 for him. He played for four full seasons at Bradford City and into the start of 1972–1973 season, scoring 25 goals in 131 league appearances. He also had a good scoring record in the FA Cup and League Cup, with three goals in the former and six in the latter in a total of 20 cup games.

In September 1972 he left Valley Parade to join Plymouth Argyle. He scored on his debut against Shrewsbury Town but it proved to be his last first-team appearance. A few days later he was struck by a car as he crossed a road. He tried to resurrect his career even scoring twice in a reserve game, but he quit following advice from a specialist. He had a benefit game against Manchester United.

In April 1977 he was found dead in his car, having committed suicide by carbon monoxide poisoning.
