= Chris Harker (footballer) =

English footballer

Personal information
- Full name: Christopher Joseph Harker
- Date of birth: 29 June 1937
- Place of birth: Shiremoor, England
- Date of death: 5 September 2014 (aged 77)
- Place of death: Darlington, England
- Height: 5 ft 10 in (1.78 m)
- Position: Goalkeeper

Senior career*
Years	Team	Apps	(Gls)
1952–1954	Backworth Welfare		
1954–1957	West Allotment Celtic		
1957–1958	Newcastle United	1	(0)
1958–1959	Consett		
1959–1961	Aberdeen		
1961–1967	Bury	178	(0)
1967–1968	Grimsby Town	10	(0)
1968–1970	Rochdale	92	(0)
1970–197?	Stockton		
Total		281	(0)
- * Club domestic league appearances and goals

Christopher Joseph Harker (29 June 1937 – 5 September 2014) was an English professional footballer who played as a goalkeeper.

On the 26 December 1962, in icy conditions and torrential rain, Harker collided with Sunderland striker Brian Clough, and the latter sustained career-ending injuries.
