= Terry Melling =

English footballer (1940–2021)

Personal information
- Full name: Terence Melling
- Date of birth: 24 January 1940
- Place of birth: Haverton Hill, England
- Date of death: 21 March 2021 (aged 81)
- Place of death: Northampton, England
- Position: Forward

Senior career*
Years	Team	Apps	(Gls)
1958–1960	Slough Town	30	(21)
1962	Slough Town	4	(1)
1962	Tooting & Mitcham United	1	(0)
–	Maidstone United		
196?–1965	Tow Law Town		
1965–1966	Newcastle United	0	(0)
1966–1967	Watford	24	(5)
1967	Newport County	34	(14)
1967–1968	Mansfield Town	33	(7)
1968–1969	Rochdale	20	(8)
1969	Darlington	21	(6)
1969–19??	Scarborough		
–	Tow Law Town		
- * Club domestic league appearances and goals

Terence Melling (24 January 1940 – 21 March 2021) was an English footballer who scored 40 goals from 129 appearances in the Football League playing as a forward for Watford, Newport County, Mansfield Town, Rochdale and Darlington. He also played non-league football for clubs including Slough Town, Maidstone United, Tooting & Mitcham United, Tow Law Town and Scarborough, and was on Newcastle United's books, but never played for them in the League.

== Life and career ==
Melling was born in Haverton Hill, County Durham, and attended St Thomas' School in nearby Port Clarence, where he played for the school football team. He joined the army, serving with the Coldstream Guards in which he reached the rank of sergeant. He played representative football for the Army against civilian opponents as well as other service teams. He was a member of the British team that won the 1964 Kentish Cup, a triangular tournament for the Belgian, British and French Army teams, and also played against the Navy for an Amateur XI selected by the Football Association. While a serving soldier, Melling also played for amateur clubs in the south-east of England including Slough Town, whose website describes him as a "brave, bustling centre forward", Maidstone United and Tooting & Mitcham United.

He returned to his native north-east of England, where he worked in a shipyard and played non-league football for Tow Law Town before turning professional with Newcastle United in December 1965. Unable to force his way into Newcastle's first team, he moved on to Third Division club Watford on a free transfer in May 1966, and made his debut in the Football League in the last match of the 1965–66 season, a 1–1 draw away to Scunthorpe United, at the unusually late age of 26. This was the first of several short spells with clubs in the lower divisions of the Football League – nine months with Watford, nine months in the Fourth Division with Newport County, ten months in Division Three with Mansfield Town, six months with Rochdale, where he contributed to their third-place finish and consequent first ever promotion from Division Four, and finally six months with Darlington. He played regularly with each of those clubs, and averaged a goal every three games. In October 1969, Melling signed for Northern Premier League club Scarborough, and he later rejoined Tow Law.

After football, Melling worked in the building trade. Head injuries suffered in an accident in 1986 left him deaf and with other disabilities. Melling lived in Andover, Hampshire and then in a care home in Northampton. He had dementia in later life, and died in March 2021 at the age of 81.
