= Stuart Brace =

English footballer

Stuart Brace (born 21 September 1942) is a former professional footballer played as a winger or forward. He scored 155 goals from 423 games in the Football League, playing for Plymouth Argyle, Watford, Mansfield Town, Peterborough United, Grimsby Town (206 league games), Southend United, and Falmouth Town. He also played Second XI cricket for Somerset while at Plymouth Argyle.
