= Ronnie Blair =

Northern Irish association football player

Personal information
- Full name: Ronald Victor Blair
- Date of birth: 26 September 1949 (age 77)
- Place of birth: Coleraine, Northern Ireland
- Height: 1.75 m (5 ft 9 in)
- Position: Midfielder

Youth career
- 1965–1966: Coleraine

Senior career*
Years	Team	Apps	(Gls)
1966–1970	Oldham Athletic	77	(1)
1969–1970	→ Preston North End (loan)	0	(0)
1970–1972	Rochdale	70	(3)
1972–1981	Oldham Athletic	295	(21)
1978	→ Colorado Caribous (loan)	18	(1)
1981–1982	Blackpool	36	(3)
1982–1983	Rochdale	3	(0)
- Castleton Gabriels
Total		499	(29)

International career
1974–1976	Northern Ireland	5	(0)

Managerial career
- Castleton Gabriels
- Bacup Borough
- * Club domestic league appearances and goals

Ronald Victor Blair (born 26 September 1949) is a Northern Irish former professional football player and manager.

== Career ==
Born in Coleraine, Blair played for Coleraine, Oldham Athletic, Preston North End, Rochdale, Colorado Caribous and Blackpool. He also earned 5 caps for the Northern Ireland national team.

He later became player-manager at Castleton Gabriels, and manager at Bacup Borough.
