= Tommy Mitchinson =

English footballer

Personal information
- Full name: Thomas William Mitchinson
- Date of birth: 24 February 1943
- Place of birth: Sunderland, England
- Date of death: 2006 (aged 62–63)
- Height: 5 ft 7 in (1.70 m)
- Position: Midfielder

Senior career*
Years	Team	Apps	(Gls)
1960–1966	Sunderland	17	(2)
1966–1967	Mansfield Town	76	(15)
1967–1969	Aston Villa	49	(9)
1969–1971	Torquay United	108	(9)
1971–1972	Bournemouth & Boscombe Athletic	23	(1)
1972–1973	Bournemouth	9	(0)
- * Club domestic league appearances and goals

Thomas William Mitchinson (24 February 1943 – 2006) was an English professional footballer who played as a midfielder for Sunderland.
