= Derek Rickard =

English footballer

Personal information
- Full name: Derek Bryan Philip Rickard
- Date of birth: 1 October 1947 (age 79)
- Place of birth: Plymouth, England
- Position: Forward

Senior career*
| Years | Team | Apps | (Gls) |
| 1964–1965 | Torpoint Athletic | | |
| 1965–1969 | St Austell | | |
| 1969–1974 | Plymouth Argyle | 110 | (41) |
| 1974–1976 | Bournemouth | 32 | (6) |
| 1976–1979 | Falmouth Town | | |
| 1979–1982 | Saltash United | | |
- * Club domestic league appearances and goals

Derek Bryan Philip Rickard (born 1 October 1947) is an English former professional footballer.

He played as a forward for Football League clubs Plymouth Argyle and Bournemouth.

== Playing career ==
Rickard joined hometown club Plymouth Argyle in December 1969 as a 22-year-old, making his debut against Halifax Town. He made an immediate impact and was voted as the club's player of the year in 1970, having been there just under six months. He made 121 appearances in all competitions for the club, scoring 42 goals. His best season came in 1971–72 when he scored 14 goals in just 19 league appearances. He joined Bournemouth in 1974 and spent two years with the Cherries, making 32 league appearances. After playing for Bournemouth he played for Falmouth Town and Saltash United
