= Colin Parry (footballer) =

English footballer (1941–2020)

Personal information
- Full name: Colin Parry
- Date of birth: 16 February 1941
- Place of birth: Stockport, England
- Date of death: 13 August 2020 (aged 79)
- Position: Central defender

Senior career*
Years	Team	Apps	(Gls)
- Vernon Park
1962–1968	Stockport County	133	(0)
1965	→ Bradford City (loan)	5	(0)
1968–1972	Rochdale	157	(1)
- Macclesfield Town
- Morecambe
Total		295	(1)
- * Club domestic league appearances and goals

Colin Parry (16 February 1941 – 13 August 2020) was an English professional footballer who played as a central defender.

== Career ==
Born in Stockport, Parry played for Vernon Park, Stockport County, Bradford City, Rochdale, Macclesfield Town and Morecambe.

He was on loan at Bradford City from Stockport County between September and October 1965, making 5 league appearances for the club.

He died on 13 August 2020.

== Sources ==
- Frost, Terry (1988). Bradford City A Complete Record 1903-1988. Breedon Books Sport. ISBN 0-907969-38-0.
