= Dick Conner =

English footballer and manager

Personal information
- Full name: Richard John Conner
- Date of birth: 13 August 1931
- Place of birth: Jarrow, England
- Date of death: May 1999 (aged 67)
- Place of death: Jarrow, England
- Position: Wing half

Youth career
- Newcastle United

Senior career*
Years	Team	Apps	(Gls)
1950–1951	Newcastle United	0	(0)
1951–1952	South Shields		
1953–1959	Grimsby Town	186	(8)
1959–1961	Southampton	78	(2)
1961–1962	Tranmere Rovers	4	(0)
1962–1963	Aldershot	6	(0)
Total		274	(10)

Managerial career
- 1968: Aldershot
- 1970–1973: Rochdale
- 1973–1974: Darlington
- * Club domestic league appearances and goals

Richard John Conner (13 August 1931 – May 1999) was an English football player and manager. He played as wing half for Newcastle United, South Shields, Grimsby Town, Southampton, Tranmere Rovers and Aldershot. He went on to manage Aldershot as caretaker, Rochdale and Darlington.
