= Norman Whitehead (footballer) =

English footballer

Personal information
- Full name: Norman John Whitehead
- Date of birth: 22 April 1948 (age 78)
- Place of birth: Liverpool, England
- Height: 5 ft 9 in (1.75 m)
- Position: Winger

Youth career
- Skelmersdale United

Senior career*
| Years | Team | Apps | (Gls) |
| 1967–1968 | Southport | 8 | (0) |
| 1968–1972 | Rochdale | 156 | (11) |
| 1972–1973 | Rotherham United | 33 | (2) |
| 1973–1976 | Chester | 74 | (8) |
| 1976–1977 | Grimsby Town | 4 | (0) |
- Rhyl
| Total | | 275 | (21) |
- * Club domestic league appearances and goals

Norman John Whitehead is a footballer who played as a winger in the Football League for Southport, Rochdale, Rotherham United, Chester and Grimsby Town.
