= Derek Ryder =

English footballer (1947–2026)

Personal information
- Full name: Derek Francis Ryder
- Date of birth: 18 February 1947
- Place of birth: Leeds, England
- Date of death: July 2026 (aged 79)
- Position: Full back

Senior career*
Years	Team	Apps	(Gls)
1964–1966	Leeds United	0	(0)
1966–1968	Cardiff City	4	(0)
1968–1972	Rochdale	167	(1)
1972–1974	Southport	82	(2)
- * Club domestic league appearances and goals

Derek Francis Ryder (18 February 1947 – July 2026) was an English professional footballer who played as a full back.

== Career ==
Ryder began his career with his hometown club Leeds United but was released in 1966 after failing to break into the first team. He joined Cardiff City and, although he again struggled to establish himself, he made his professional debut in the Football League. He signed for Rochdale and went on to make over 150 appearances for the club, helping win promotion to the Third Division. He finished his professional career with Southport.

== Death ==
Ryder died in July 2026, at the age of 79.
