= Alan Welsh =

Scottish footballer

Personal information
- Full name: Alan Welsh
- Date of birth: 9 July 1947 (age 79)
- Place of birth: Edinburgh, Scotland
- Date of death: 16 August 2020
- Height: 5 ft 8 in (1.73 m)
- Position: Winger

Senior career*
Years	Team	Apps	(Gls)
–	Bonnyrigg Rose Athletic		
1965–1967	Millwall	5	(0)
1967–1972	Torquay United	146	(45)
1972–1974	Plymouth Argyle	66	(14)
1974–1975	Bournemouth	35	(3)
1975–1976	Millwall	9	(1)
–	Cape Town City		
- * Club domestic league appearances and goals

Alan Welsh (9 July 1947 – 16 August 2020) was a Scottish footballer who played as a winger. He made 261 appearances in the Football League for Millwall, Torquay United, Plymouth Argyle and Bournemouth.
