= Joe Ashworth =

English footballer

Personal information
- Full name: Joseph Matthew Ashworth
- Date of birth: 6 January 1943
- Place of birth: Huddersfield, England
- Date of death: 2002 (aged 58–59)
- Position: Wing half

Youth career
- ????–1960: Bradford Park Avenue

Senior career*
Years	Team	Apps	(Gls)
1960–1962	Bradford Park Avenue	3	(0)
1962–1965	York City	57	(0)
1965–1967	Bournemouth	60	(2)
1967–1968	Southend United	36	(2)
1968–1971	Rochdale	132	(3)
1971–1972	Chester	5	(0)
1972	Stockport County	14	(0)
- * Club domestic league appearances and goals

Joseph Matthew Ashworth (6 January 1943 – 2002) was an English footballer who played as a wing half.

== Career ==
Ashworth was born in Huddersfield, West Yorkshire and progressed through the junior ranks at Bradford Park Avenue, before signing as a professional in January 1960. After making three Football League appearances in two and a half years at Park Avenue, he joined Fourth Division team York City in May 1962. His debut came in a 0–0 draw with Rochdale in the FA Cup first round on 3 November 1962. The opportunity of his league debut came after an injury to Alan Woods, nearly a year after signing, and he played in a 5–2 victory over Oldham Athletic on 20 April 1963. He finished the 1962–63 season with nine appearances. He was released by York in the summer of 1965 after making 65 appearances for the team.

He signed for Bournemouth in June, where he played for two seasons, making 60 league appearances and scoring two goals before joining Southend United in July 1967. Ashworth made 36 league appearances and scored two goals during the 1967–68 season for Southend before joining Rochdale in July 1968. He made 132 league appearances and scored three goals for Rochdale, before moving on to Chester in December 1971. He made five appearances for Chester in the remainder of the 1971–72 season and joined Stockport County in June 1962. He made 14 league appearances at Stockport before retiring. Following his retirement, he joined Her Majesty's Prison Service and died in 2002.

== Style of play ==
He was a good passer of the ball and during his career was regarded as one of the best passers in the lower leagues.
