= Tony Buck (footballer) =

English footballer

Personal information
- Full name: Anthony Rowland Buck
- Date of birth: 18 August 1944 (age 82)
- Place of birth: Clowne, England
- Position: Striker

Youth career
- Eastbourne Town

Senior career*
Years	Team	Apps	(Gls)
1962–1967	Oxford United	35	(6)
1967–1969	Newport County	49	(16)
1969–1973	Rochdale	82	(29)
1972	→ Bradford City (loan)	3	(0)
1973–1974	Northampton Town	17	(3)
- Bedford Town
Total		187	(54)
- * Club domestic league appearances and goals

Anthony Rowland Buck (born 18 August 1944) is an English former professional footballer who played as a striker.

== Career ==
Born in Clowne, Buck played for Eastbourne Town, Oxford United, Newport County, Rochdale, Bradford City, Northampton Town and Bedford Town.

He was with Bradford City from January 1972 to February 1972, on loan from Rochdale, making 3 appearances in the Football League for them.

== Sources ==
- Frost, Terry (1988). Bradford City A Complete Record 1903-1988. Breedon Books Sport. ISBN 0-907969-38-0.
