= Graham Smith (footballer, born 1946) =

English footballer

Personal information
- Full name: Graham Leslie Smith
- Date of birth: 20 June 1946 (age 80)
- Place of birth: Pudsey, England
- Height: 5 ft 10 in (1.78 m)
- Position: Defender

Youth career
- –1966: Leeds United

Senior career*
Years	Team	Apps	(Gls)
1966–1974	Rochdale	317	(3)
1974–1979	Stockport County	151	(2)
1979–1980	Buxton		
Total		468	(5)
- * Club domestic league appearances and goals

Graham Leslie Smith (born 20 June 1946) is an English former professional footballer who played as a defender. He played in the Football League for Rochdale and Stockport County.
