= Reg Jenkins =

English footballer

Personal information
- Date of birth: 7 October 1938
- Place of birth: Millbrook, England
- Date of death: 29 January 2013 (aged 74)
- Place of death: Tenerife, Spain
- Position: Inside forward

Senior career*
Years	Team	Apps	(Gls)
1957–1960	Plymouth Argyle	16	(3)
1960–1961	Exeter City	20	(6)
1961–1964	Torquay United	88	(23)
1964–1973	Rochdale	305	(119)
- * Club domestic league appearances and goals

Reginald Jenkins (7 October 1938 – 29 January 2013) was an English footballer who played as an inside forward in the Football League between the 1950s and 1970s.

Jenkins was born in Millbrook, Cornwall. After short spells with Plymouth Argyle and Exeter City, he joined Torquay United in the 1961–62 season, and went on to make 88 league appearances for the Gulls.

He joined Rochdale in 1964–65 and went on to play for them for nine seasons. He became Rochdale's record goalscorer, scored 119 league goals for the club, and made 305 appearances a then record, surpassed a year later by Graham Smith. In 2004, he was voted Rochdale's greatest-ever player by the club's fans.

While recuperating from a knee operation in Tenerife, Spain, Jenkins died in January 2013 at the age of 74.

A year after his death, in February 2014, his home-town club, Millbrook, renamed their ground in honour of Jenkins. The ground, formerly known as Mill Park, is now officially referred to as Jenkins Park. In October 2016, the club renovated the main stand to reflect the name change.
