= 1974–75 Rochdale A.F.C. season =

English football club season

Rochdale
1974–75 season
- Manager: Walter Joyce
- League Division Four: 19th
- FA Cup: 2nd Round
- League Cup: 1st Round
- Top goalscorer: League: Tony Whelan; Bob Mountford; All: Tony Whelan; Bob Mountford

The 1974–75 season was Rochdale A.F.C.'s 68th in existence and their first back in the Football League Fourth Division, following relegation the previous season.

== Statistics ==
No.	Pos	Nat	Player	Total		Division 4		F.A. Cup		League Cup	
No.	Pos	Nat	Player	Apps	Goals	Apps	Goals	Apps	Goals	Apps	Goals
	GK	(England) ENG	Mike Poole	48	0	43+0	0	4+0	0	1+0	0
	DF	(England) ENG	Paul Hallows	51	1	46+0	1	4+0	0	1+0	0
	FW	(England) ENG	Tony Whelan	51	10	46+0	10	4+0	0	1+0	0
	MF	(England) ENG	Stan Horne	26	2	21+0	2	4+0	0	1+0	0
	DF	(England) ENG	Jim Grummett	15	0	14+0	0	0+0	0	1+0	0
	MF	(England) ENG	Mike Ferguson	46	5	42+0	5	3+0	0	1+0	0
	FW	(England) ENG	Alan Taylor	20	6	19+0	6	0+0	0	1+0	0
	MF	(England) ENG	David Carrick	21	2	15+1	1	4+0	1	1+0	0
	FW	(England) ENG	Leo Skeete	12	2	10+0	2	1+0	0	1+0	0
	FW	(England) ENG	Mike Brennan	13	1	9+1	1	1+1	0	1+0	0
	FW	(England) ENG	Neil Young	17	5	8+5	4	3+0	1	1+0	0
	DF	(England) ENG	Harold Martin	14	0	11+3	0	0+0	0	0+0	0
	MF	(England) ENG	Paul Fielding	29	4	27+0	4	1+0	0	0+1	0
	FW	(England) ENG	Gary Cooper	22	4	18+4	4	0+0	0	0+0	0
	MF	(England) ENG	Don Tobin	26	0	26+0	0	0+0	0	0+0	0
	DF	(England) ENG	Keith Hanvey	39	2	35+0	2	4+0	0	0+0	0
	MF	(England) ENG	Paul Brears	28	1	23+1	0	4+0	1	0+0	0
	DF	(England) ENG	David Seddon	15	0	10+2	0	3+0	0	0+0	0
	GK	(England) ENG	John Taylor	3	0	3+0	0	0+0	0	0+0	0
	FW	(England) ENG	Gary Hulmes	5	1	1+3	1	0+1	0	0+0	0
	DF	(England) ENG	Dick Mulvaney	34	3	30+0	3	4+0	0	0+0	0
	DF	(England) ENG	George Townsend	23	0	23+0	0	0+0	0	0+0	0
	FW	(England) ENG	Bob Hutchinson	2	1	2+0	1	0+0	0	0+0	0
	FW	(England) ENG	Bob Mountford	16	10	16+0	10	0+0	0	0+0	0
	MF	(Scotland) SCO	Joe Murty	6	0	3+3	0	0+0	0	0+0	0
	MF	(England) ENG	Billy Bell	6	0	5+1	0	0+0	0	0+0	0

== Final League Table ==
Pos	Team	Pld	W	D	L	GF	GA	GAv	Pts	Promotion or relegation
17	Doncaster Rovers	46	14	12	20	65	79	0.823	40	
18	Crewe Alexandra	46	11	18	17	34	47	0.723	40	
19	Rochdale	46	13	13	20	59	75	0.787	39	
20	Stockport County	46	12	14	20	43	70	0.614	38	
21	Darlington	46	13	10	23	54	67	0.806	36	Re-elected

Source: rsssf.com

== Competitions ==
=== Football League Fourth Division ===
17 August 1974 1	Shrewsbury Town	1–1	Rochdale	Shrewsbury
	Kearney 27'	Report	Young 44'	Stadium: Gay Meadow; Attendance: 3513

24 August 1974 2	Rochdale	1–1	Torquay United	Rochdale
	Taylor	Report	Tearse 59'	Stadium: Spotland Stadium; Attendance: 1271

30 August 1974 3	Mansfield Town	2–0	Rochdale	Mansfield
	O'Connor; Clarke	Report		Stadium: Field Mill; Attendance: 3779

7 September 1974 4	Rochdale	3–1	Barnsley	Rochdale
	Taylor 14'; Horne 43'; Skeete 69'	Report	Doyle 37'	Stadium: Spotland Stadium; Attendance: 1376

13 September 1974 5	Doncaster Rovers	4–1	Rochdale	Doncaster
	Murray; Kitchen	Report	Carrick	Stadium: Belle Vue; Attendance: 1928

16 September 1974 6	Darlington	1–2	Rochdale	Darlington
	Burluraux	Report	Taylor	Stadium: Feethams; Attendance: 2345

21 September 1974 7	Rochdale	2–0	Workington	Rochdale
	Ferguson 43' (pen.), 69'	Report		Stadium: Spotland Stadium; Attendance: 1385

23 September 1974 8	Rochdale	0–0	Brentford	Rochdale
		Report		Stadium: Spotland Stadium; Attendance: 1587; Referee: T Farley

28 September 1974 9	Lincoln City	3–0	Rochdale	Lincoln
	Graham 16', 49'; Krzywicki 74'	Report		Stadium: Sincil Bank; Attendance: 2461

30 September 1974 10	Rochdale	0–2	Reading	Rochdale
		Report	Murray; Habbin	Stadium: Spotland Stadium; Attendance: 1684

4 October 1974 11	Stockport County	2–3	Rochdale	Stockport
	Fryatt; Lawther	Report	Crowther (o.g.); Whelan; Brennan	Stadium: Edgeley Park; Attendance: 2354

12 October 1974 12	Rochdale	1–2	Rotherham United	Rochdale
	Young 75'	Report	Crawford 22'; Womble 27'	Stadium: Spotland Stadium; Attendance: 1684

18 October 1974 13	Swansea City	3–3	Rochdale	Swansea
	Bruton (pen.); Evans 51'; Bevan 85'	Report	Skeete 14'; Taylor 31'; Hulmes 78'	Stadium: Vetch Field; Attendance: 2767

21 October 1974 14	Rochdale	2–2	Northampton Town	Rochdale
	Cooper; Horne	Report	Mabee; Wainwright	Stadium: Spotland Stadium; Attendance: 1379

26 October 1974 15	Rochdale	2–4	Newport County	Rochdale
	Ferguson 20' (pen.); Taylor 35'	Report	Woods 6'; Godfrey 12'; Jones 60', 74'	Stadium: Spotland Stadium; Attendance: 1208

2 November 1974 16	Chester	4–0	Rochdale	Chester
	Edwards 58'; Draper 62', 72', 78'	Report		Stadium: Sealand Road; Attendance: 3291

5 November 1974 17	Northampton Town	0–1	Rochdale	Northampton
		Report	Whelan	Stadium: County Ground; Attendance: 5695

9 November 1974 18	Rochdale	0–0	Cambridge United	Rochdale
		Report		Stadium: Spotland Stadium; Attendance: 1116

16 November 1974 19	Scunthorpe United	2–2	Rochdale	Scunthorpe
	Pilling 52', 63'	Report	Taylor 36'; Whelan 40'	Stadium: Old Show Ground; Attendance: 1787

30 November 1974 20	Rochdale	1–1	Exeter City	Rochdale
	Mulvaney 75'	Report	Beer 49'	Stadium: Spotland Stadium; Attendance: 1033

7 December 1974 21	Crewe Alexandra	0–1	Rochdale	Crewe
		Report	Young 89'	Stadium: Gresty Road; Attendance: 1803

21 December 1974 22	Hartlepool United	5–0	Rochdale	Hartlepool
	Honour 22'; McMahon 31', 40'; Moore 59', 71'	Report		Stadium: Victoria Park; Attendance: 1991

26 December 1974 23	Rochdale	2–0	Doncaster Rovers	Rochdale
	Hutchinson; Fielding	Report		Stadium: Spotland Stadium; Attendance: 1077

28 December 1974 24	Bradford City	1–0	Rochdale	Bradford
	Cooke 60'	Report		Stadium: Valley Parade; Attendance: 3250

4 January 1975 25	Rochdale	2–0	Darlington	Rochdale
	Mountford 20', 79'	Report		Stadium: Spotland Stadium; Attendance: 1217

11 January 1975 26	Rochdale	3–0	Crewe Alexandra	Rochdale
	Ferguson 20'; Whelan 44'; Fielding 60'	Report		Stadium: Spotland Stadium; Attendance: 1749

18 January 1975 27	Exeter City	2–1	Rochdale	Exeter
	Bowker 1'; Robertson 32' (pen.)	Report	Fielding 61'	Stadium: St James Park; Attendance: 3560

1 February 1975 28	Cambridge United	1–1	Rochdale	Cambridge
	Tully 48' (pen.)	Report	Mountford 33'	Stadium: Abbey Stadium; Attendance: 3118

8 February 1975 29	Rochdale	0–1	Chester	Rochdale
	Mountford (red card) 55'	Report	Redfern 65'	Stadium: Spotland Stadium; Attendance: 2273

14 February 1975 30	Southport	1–0	Rochdale	Southport
	Gough	Report		Stadium: Haig Avenue; Attendance: 1569

17 February 1975 31	Rochdale	1–1	Bradford City	Rochdale
	Mountford 87'	Report	Ham 62'	Stadium: Spotland Stadium; Attendance: 2004

22 February 1975 32	Rochdale	4–2	Scunthorpe United	Rochdale
	Whelan 40'; Mountford 72', 73'; Hallows 84'	Report	Collier 77'; Roberts 88'	Stadium: Spotland Stadium; Attendance: 1430

1 March 1975 33	Rochdale	0–1	Mansfield Town	Rochdale
		Report	Clarke 37'	Stadium: Spotland Stadium; Attendance: 2317

8 March 1975 34	Brentford	3–0	Rochdale	Brentford
	Johnson 9'; Graham 42'; Cross 55'	Report		Stadium: Griffin Park; Attendance: 4460

11 March 1975 35	Rochdale	3–3	Southport	Rochdale
	Mountford; Mulvaney	Report	O'Riley; Noble	Stadium: Spotland Stadium; Attendance: 1191

15 March 1975 36	Rochdale	1–1	Lincoln City	Rochdale
	Whelan 89'	Report	Ellis 51' (pen.)	Stadium: Spotland Stadium; Attendance: 1517

17 March 1975 37	Rochdale	0–0	Shrewsbury Town	Rochdale
		Report		Stadium: Spotland Stadium; Attendance: 1427

22 March 1975 38	Barnsley	5–3	Rochdale	Barnsley
	Doyle 19' (pen.); Butler 21', 54', 64'; Peachey 33'	Report	Cooper 38', 39'; Young 62'	Stadium: Oakwell; Attendance: 3594

29 March 1975 39	Rochdale	3–0	Hartlepool United	Rochdale
	Fielding 18'; Hanvey 29'; Whelan 73'	Report		Stadium: Spotland Stadium; Attendance: 1297

31 March 1975 40	Workington	2–1	Rochdale	Workington
	Harris; Geidmintis (pen.); Helliwell (red card)	Report	Mulvaney; Mountford (red card)	Stadium: Borough Park; Attendance: 1870

5 April 1975 41	Newport County	3–2	Rochdale	Newport
	Hooper 7' (pen.), 13', 83'	Report	Mountford 30'; Whelan 55'	Stadium: Somerton Park; Attendance: 1801

9 April 1975 42	Reading	2–1	Rochdale	Reading
	Friday; Alleyne	Report	Hanvey	Stadium: Elm Park; Attendance: 3861

12 April 1975 43	Rochdale	3–0	Stockport County	Rochdale
	Whelan 3', 48'; Cooper 69'	Report		Stadium: Spotland Stadium; Attendance: 1880

19 April 1975 44	Rotherham United	3–1	Rochdale	Rotherham
	Habbin 3', 88'; Womble 61'	Report	Cooper 26'	Stadium: Millmoor; Attendance: 7536

23 April 1975 45	Torquay United	3–0	Rochdale	Torquay
	Provan	Report		Stadium: Plainmoor; Attendance: 2718

26 April 1975 46	Rochdale	1–0	Swansea City	Rochdale
	Mountford 34'	Report		Stadium: Spotland Stadium; Attendance: 1548

=== F.A. Cup ===
23 November 1974 1	Rochdale	0–0	Marine	Rochdale
		Report		Stadium: Spotland Stadium; Attendance: 2041

27 November 1974 1	Marine	1–2 (a.e.t.)	Rochdale	Crosby
	Woosey	Report	Young; Carrick	Stadium: Rossett Park; Attendance: 2540

14 December 1974 2	Rochdale	1–1	Tranmere Rovers	Rochdale
	Brears 34'	Report	Hanvey 77' (o.g.)	Stadium: Spotland Stadium; Attendance: 2221

16 December 1974 2	Tranmere Rovers	1–0	Rochdale	Birkenhead
	Crossley	Report		Stadium: Prenton Park; Attendance: 3244

=== League Cup ===
24 August 1974 1	Preston North End	1–0	Rochdale	Preston
	Holden	Report		Stadium: Deepdale; Attendance: 7780
