= 1975–76 Rochdale A.F.C. season =

English football club season

Rochdale
1975–76 season
- Manager: Walter Joyce
- League Division Four: 15th
- FA Cup: 3rd Round
- League Cup: 1st Round
- Top goalscorer: League: Bob Mountford; All: Bob Mountford

The 1975–76 season was Rochdale A.F.C.'s 69th in existence and their 2nd consecutive in the Football League Fourth Division

== Statistics ==
No.	Pos	Nat	Player	Total		Division 4		F.A. Cup		League Cup	
No.	Pos	Nat	Player	Apps	Goals	Apps	Goals	Apps	Goals	Apps	Goals
	GK	(England) ENG	Mike Poole	51	0	43+0	0	6+0	0	2+0	0
	DF	(England) ENG	Paul Hallows	54	0	45+0	0	7+0	0	2+0	0
	DF	(England) ENG	George Townsend	13	0	8+1	0	2+0	0	2+0	0
	DF	(England) ENG	Dick Mulvaney	44	1	38+0	1	5+0	0	0+1	0
	DF	(England) ENG	Bill Summerscales	51	2	43+0	2	6+0	0	2+0	0
	DF	(England) ENG	Keith Hanvey	37	2	28+0	2	7+0	0	2+0	0
	MF	(England) ENG	Paul Fielding	33	1	26+4	1	2+0	0	1+0	0
	FW	(England) ENG	Bob Mountford	53	17	44+0	14	7+0	3	2+0	0
	FW	(England) ENG	Tony Whelan	53	7	44+0	6	7+0	1	2+0	0
	MF	(England) ENG	Tony Lacey	49	0	41+0	0	6+0	0	2+0	0
	MF	(England) ENG	Andy Sweeney	20	0	12+5	0	1+0	0	2+0	0
	FW	(England) ENG	Gary Cooper	48	4	40+1	4	6+0	0	1+0	0
	MF	(England) ENG	Mike Ferguson	36	1	26+1	0	7+0	1	2+0	0
	MF	(Scotland) SCO	Joe Murty	15	2	12+2	2	0+1	0	0+0	0
	MF	(England) ENG	Don Tobin	17	6	13+0	5	4+0	1	0+0	0
	FW	(England) ENG	Gary Hulmes	6	0	3+3	0	0+0	0	0+0	0
	MF	(England) ENG	Chris Duffey	2	0	2+0	0	0+0	0	0+0	0
	GK	(England) ENG	Brian Oliver	4	0	3+0	0	1+0	0	0+0	0
	MF	(England) ENG	Phil Mullington	28	3	25+0	2	3+0	1	0+0	0
	DF	(England) ENG	Billy Boslem	9	1	8+1	1	0+0	0	0+0	0
	MF	(England) ENG	Paul Brears	2	0	2+0	0	0+0	0	0+0	0
	FW	(England) ENG	David Ainsworth	2	0	0+2	0	0+0	0	0+0	0

== Final League Table ==
Pos	Team	Pld	W	D	L	GF	GA	GAv	Pts
13	Cambridge United	46	14	15	17	58	62	0.935	43
14	Hartlepool	46	16	10	20	62	78	0.795	42
15	Rochdale	46	12	18	16	40	54	0.741	42
16	Crewe Alexandra	46	13	15	18	58	57	1.018	41
17	Bradford City	46	12	17	17	63	65	0.969	41

== Competitions ==
=== Football League Fourth Division ===
16 August 1975 1	Reading	2–0	Rochdale	Reading
	Youlden 10'; Hetzke 62'	Report		Stadium: Elm Park; Attendance: 4717

23 August 1975 2	Rochdale	2–1	Swansea City	Rochdale
	Mountford 13', 78'	Report	Leitch	Stadium: Spotland Stadium; Attendance: 1169

30 August 1975 3	Huddersfield Town	0–0	Rochdale	Huddersfield
		Report		Stadium: Leeds Road; Attendance: 4185

6 September 1975 4	Rochdale	4–3	Newport County	Rochdale
	Cooper 14', 42'; Mountford 23', 56'	Report	Woods 65', 88'; Jones 76'	Stadium: Spotland Stadium; Attendance: 1119

13 September 1975 5	Torquay United	1–0	Rochdale	Torquay
	Summerscales 9' (o.g.)	Report		Stadium: Plainmoor; Attendance: 1852

20 September 1975 6	Rochdale	0–0	Bradford City	Rochdale
		Report		Stadium: Spotland Stadium; Attendance: 2004

24 September 1975 7	Crewe Alexandra	0–0	Rochdale	Crewe
		Report		Stadium: Gresty Road; Attendance: 4294

26 September 1975 8	Stockport County	0–1	Rochdale	Stockport
		Report	Mountford	Stadium: Edgeley Park; Attendance: 3436

4 October 1975 9	Rochdale	0–1	Exeter City	Rochdale
		Report	Bowker 27'; Hatch (red card) 89'	Stadium: Spotland Stadium; Attendance: 1234

11 October 1975 10	Scunthorpe United	1–3	Rochdale	Scunthorpe
	Green 73'	Report	Mountford 18', 60'; Whelan 39'	Stadium: Old Show Ground; Attendance: 2671

18 October 1975 11	Rochdale	2–1	Watford	Rochdale
	Summerscales 47'; Tobin 84'	Report	Jenkins 90'	Stadium: Spotland Stadium; Attendance: 1528

22 October 1975 12	Bournemouth	2–1	Rochdale	Bournemouth
	Cunningham; Morgan	Report	Tobin	Stadium: Dean Court; Attendance: 4395

25 October 1975 13	Southport	0–1	Rochdale	Southport
		Report	Tobin 79'	Stadium: Haig Avenue; Attendance: 1447

1 November 1975 14	Rochdale	4–1	Tranmere Rovers	Rochdale
	Tobin 5'; Whelan 7'; Mountford 33', 87'	Report	James 80'	Stadium: Spotland Stadium; Attendance: 2047; Referee: KS Hackett

3 November 1975 15	Rochdale	0–2	Northampton Town	Rochdale
		Report	Stratford; Robertson	Stadium: Spotland Stadium; Attendance: 2995

8 November 1975 16	Lincoln City	2–0	Rochdale	Lincoln
	Krzywicki 38'; Graham 89'	Report		Stadium: Sincil Bank; Attendance: 7063

14 November 1975 17	Rochdale	1–1	Cambridge United	Rochdale
	Mulvaney 20'	Report	Lyon 83'	Stadium: Spotland Stadium; Attendance: 1562

29 November 1975 18	Rochdale	1–1	Workington	Rochdale
	Tobin 64'	Report	Ward 75'	Stadium: Spotland Stadium; Attendance: 1361

6 December 1975 19	Brentford	3–0	Rochdale	Brentford
	Johnson 17' (pen.) (red card) 77'; Cross 63'; Sweetzer (red card) 73'; Riddick 90'	Report	Poole (red card) 77'	Stadium: Griffin Park; Attendance: 4853

20 December 1975 20	Rochdale	1–1	Hartlepool United	Rochdale
	Murty 16'	Report	Scaife 83'	Stadium: Spotland Stadium; Attendance: 1156

26 December 1975 21	Barnsley	2–1	Rochdale	Barnsley
	Millar; Brown	Report	Mountford	Stadium: Oakwell; Attendance: 3486

27 December 1975 22	Rochdale	1–0	Darlington	Rochdale
	Murty 89'	Report		Stadium: Spotland Stadium; Attendance: 1659

17 January 1976 23	Bradford City	3–0	Rochdale	Bradford
	Hutchins 59'; Cooke 70'; Ingram 72'	Report		Stadium: Valley Parade; Attendance: 3059

20 January 1976 24	Doncaster Rovers	1–2	Rochdale	Doncaster
	Kitchen	Report	Fielding; Hanvey	Stadium: Belle Vue; Attendance: 3586

24 January 1976 25	Rochdale	2–2	Torquay United	Rochdale
	Hanvey 14'; Whelan 27'	Report	Chatterley 29'; Brown 89'	Stadium: Spotland Stadium; Attendance: 1448

7 February 1976 26	Northampton Town	1–1	Rochdale	Northampton
	Stratford 66'	Report	Whelan 77'	Stadium: County Ground; Attendance: 5393

10 February 1976 27	Rochdale	2–2	Bournemouth	Rochdale
	Mountford; Whelan	Report	Hague; Reeves	Stadium: Spotland Stadium; Attendance: 1392

14 February 1976 28	Rochdale	0–0	Lincoln City	Rochdale
		Report		Stadium: Spotland Stadium; Attendance: 2439

21 February 1976 29	Cambridge United	0–0	Rochdale	Cambridge
		Report		Stadium: Abbey Stadium; Attendance: 2048

28 February 1976 30	Rochdale	2–0	Southport	Rochdale
	Mountford 84'; Summerscales 89'	Report		Stadium: Spotland Stadium; Attendance: 1261

1 March 1976 31	Rochdale	0–0	Huddersfield Town	Rochdale
		Report		Stadium: Spotland Stadium; Attendance: 3791

6 March 1976 32	Tranmere Rovers	0–1	Rochdale	Birkenhead
		Report	Mullington 79'	Stadium: Prenton Park; Attendance: 3354

9 March 1976 33	Exeter City	1–0	Rochdale	Exeter
	Morrin 80'	Report		Stadium: St James Park; Attendance: 3102

12 March 1976 34	Rochdale	1–1	Scunthorpe United	Rochdale
	Cooper	Report	Green	Stadium: Spotland Stadium; Attendance: 1430

16 March 1976 35	Watford	3–0	Rochdale	Watford
	McCarthy; Jenkins	Report		Stadium: Vicarage Road; Attendance: 3886

20 March 1976 36	Workington	0–0	Rochdale	Workington
		Report		Stadium: Borough Park; Attendance: 941

22 March 1976 37	Rochdale	0–1	Crewe Alexandra	Rochdale
		Report	Bevan	Stadium: Spotland Stadium; Attendance: 1128

27 March 1976 38	Rochdale	1–2	Brentford	Rochdale
	Boslem 84'	Report	McCulloch 15'; French 67'	Stadium: Spotland Stadium; Attendance: 894

31 March 1976 39	Hartlepool United	3–0	Rochdale	Hartlepool
	Spelman; Moore	Report		Stadium: Victoria Park; Attendance: 1561

3 April 1976 40	Rochdale	0–0	Reading	Rochdale
		Report		Stadium: Spotland Stadium; Attendance: 913

5 April 1976 41	Rochdale	2–3	Stockport County	Rochdale
	Whelan (pen.); Mountford	Report	Bradley; Davies; Hardman	Stadium: Spotland Stadium; Attendance: 1287

10 April 1976 42	Newport County	1–1	Rochdale	Newport
	Jones 36'	Report	Mullington 26'	Stadium: Somerton Park; Attendance: 1331

16 April 1976 43	Rochdale	1–0	Doncaster Rovers	Rochdale
	Mountford	Report		Stadium: Spotland Stadium; Attendance: 1462

17 April 1976 44	Rochdale	0–0	Barnsley	Rochdale
		Report		Stadium: Spotland Stadium; Attendance: 1386

20 April 1976 45	Darlington	4–0	Rochdale	Darlington
	Webb; Craig; Sinclair	Report		Stadium: Feethams; Attendance: 1957

23 April 1976 46	Swansea City	1–1	Rochdale	Swansea
	Bruton 9'	Report	Cooper 77'	Stadium: Vetch Field; Attendance: 1664

=== F.A. Cup ===
22 November 1975 1	Workington	1–1	Rochdale	Workington
	Heslop 71'	Report	Ferguson 10'	Stadium: Borough Park; Attendance: 1190

25 November 1975 1	Rochdale	2–1 (a.e.t.)	Workington	Rochdale
	Mountford; Whelan	Report	Geidmintis	Stadium: Spotland Stadium; Attendance: 2354

13 December 1975 2	Gateshead United	1–1	Rochdale	Gateshead
	Guthrie 75'	Report	Ableson (o.g.)	Stadium: Gateshead Youth Stadium; Attendance: 4600

16 December 1975 2	Rochdale	3–1	Gateshead United	Rochdale
	Morrison (o.g.); Tobin; Mountford	Report	Morrison	Stadium: Spotland Stadium; Attendance: 2607

3 January 1976 3	Norwich City	1–1	Rochdale	Norwich
	MacDougall 4' (pen.)	Report	Mullington 34'	Stadium: Carrow Road; Attendance: 14187

6 January 1976 3	Rochdale	0–0 (a.e.t.)	Norwich City	Rochdale
		Report		Stadium: Spotland Stadium; Attendance: 8284

13 January 1976 3	Norwich City	2–1	Rochdale	Norwich
	MacDougall (pen.); Suggett	Report	Mountford	Stadium: Carrow Road; Attendance: 18868

=== League Cup ===
19 August 1975 1	Bury	2–0	Rochdale	Bury
	Nicholson	Report		Stadium: Gigg Lane; Attendance: 4561

26 August 1975 1	Rochdale	0–2 (0–4 agg.)	Bury	Rochdale
		Report	Rowland	Stadium: Spotland Stadium; Attendance: 3725
