= 1973–74 Rochdale A.F.C. season =

English football club season

Rochdale
1973–74 season
- Manager: Walter Joyce
- League Division Three: 24th
- FA Cup: 2nd Round
- League Cup: 2nd Round
- Top goalscorer: League: Leo Skeete; All: Leo Skeete

The 1973–74 season was Rochdale A.F.C.'s 67th in existence and their 5th consecutive in the Football League Third Division. They finished in 24th and last position and were relegated into the Football League Fourth Division

== Statistics ==
No.	Pos	Nat	Player	Total		Division 3		F.A. Cup		League Cup		Lancashire Cup	
No.	Pos	Nat	Player	Apps	Goals	Apps	Goals	Apps	Goals	Apps	Goals	Apps	Goals
	GK	(England) ENG	Rod Jones	9	0	8+0	0	0+0	0	1+0	0	0+0	0
	DF	(England) ENG	Graham Smith	36	0	30+0	0	3+0	0	2+0	0	1+0	0
	DF	(England) ENG	Keith Hanvey	43	3	39+0	2	2+0	1	2+0	0	0+0	0
	MF	(England) ENG	Steve Arnold	43	1	37+3	1	2+0	0	1+0	0	0+0	0
	DF	(England) ENG	Arthur Marsh	30	1	25+0	0	3+0	1	1+0	0	1+0	0
	MF	(Scotland) SCO	Len Kinsella	9	1	7+0	1	0+0	0	1+0	0	1+0	0
	FW	(England) ENG	Alan Taylor	42	3	36+0	1	3+0	1	2+0	1	1+0	0
	MF	(England) ENG	Paul Brears	1	0	1+0	0	0+0	0	0+0	0	0+0	0
	FW	(England) ENG	Bill Atkins	5	1	4+0	0	0+0	0	1+0	1	0+0	0
	FW	(Scotland) SCO	Malcolm Darling	8	3	7+0	2	0+0	0	1+0	1	0+0	0
	MF	(England) ENG	Bobby Downes	48	5	41+1	4	3+0	1	2+0	0	1+0	0
	FW	(England) ENG	Leo Skeete	32	10	26+1	9	3+0	0	2+0	1	0+0	0
	MF	(Scotland) SCO	Peter Gowans	32	1	25+4	1	2+0	0	1+0	0	0+0	0
	MF	(England) ENG	Paul Fielding	14	0	12+2	0	0+0	0	0+0	0	0+0	0
	DF	(England) ENG	Colin Blant	10	0	9+0	0	0+0	0	1+0	0	0+0	0
	DF	(England) ENG	Dick Renwick	10	0	7+1	0	0+0	0	1+0	0	1+0	0
	GK	(England) ENG	Mike Poole	43	0	38+0	0	3+0	0	1+0	0	1+0	0
	DF	(Scotland) SCO	Jimmy Burt	4	0	4+0	0	0+0	0	0+0	0	0+0	0
	MF	(England) ENG	Keith Bebbington	28	3	23+0	3	3+0	0	1+0	0	1+0	0
	FW	(England) ENG	Mike Brennan	30	3	26+1	3	0+1	0	1+0	0	1+0	0
	MF	(England) ENG	Lee Brogden	17	5	7+6	3	3+0	2	0+0	0	1+0	0
	DF	(England) ENG	Barry Bradbury	13	0	8+2	0	3+0	0	0+0	0	0+0	0
	MF	(England) ENG	Eamonn Kavanagh	4	0	2+2	0	0+0	0	0+0	0	0+0	0
	FW	(England) ENG	Gary Cooper	6	0	6+0	0	0+0	0	0+0	0	0+0	0
	MF	(England) ENG	Stan Horne	27	3	27+0	3	0+0	0	0+0	0	0+0	0
	DF	(England) ENG	Jimmy Grummett	20	2	18+2	2	0+0	0	0+0	0	0+0	0
	DF	(England) ENG	Ian Buckley	6	0	6+0	0	0+0	0	0+0	0	0+0	0
	DF	(England) ENG	David Seddon	8	0	8+0	0	0+0	0	0+0	0	0+0	0
	MF	(England) ENG	David Carrick	10	3	10+0	3	0+0	0	0+0	0	0+0	0
	MF	(England) ENG	Don Tobin	10	0	7+2	0	0+0	0	0+0	0	1+0	0
	DF	(England) ENG	Roger Denton	2	0	2+0	0	0+0	0	0+0	0	0+0	0

== Final League Table ==
Pos	Team	Pld	W	D	L	GF	GA	GAv	Pts	Promotion or relegation
20	Port Vale	46	14	14	18	52	58	0.897	42	
21	Cambridge United (R)	46	13	9	24	48	81	0.593	35	Relegation to the Fourth Division
22	Shrewsbury Town (R)	46	10	11	25	41	62	0.661	31	Relegation to the Fourth Division
23	Southport (R)	46	6	16	24	35	82	0.427	28	Relegation to the Fourth Division
24	Rochdale (R)	46	2	17	27	38	94	0.404	21	Relegation to the Fourth Division

Source: rsssf.com
(R) Relegated

== Competitions ==
=== Football League Third Division ===
25 August 1973 1	Rochdale	1–1	Brighton & Hove Albion	Rochdale
	Darling 54'	Report	Bridges 40'	Stadium: Spotland Stadium; Attendance: 2665

1 September 1973 2	Walsall	0–0	Rochdale	Walsall
		Report		Stadium: Fellows Park; Attendance: 5211

8 September 1973 3	Rochdale	0–1	Tranmere Rovers	Rochdale
		Report	Loyden 50'	Stadium: Spotland Stadium; Attendance: 2749

11 September 1973 4	Plymouth Argyle	5–0	Rochdale	Plymouth
	Hore 5'; Rogers 38'; Mariner 55', 80'; Davey 68'	Report		Stadium: Home Park; Attendance: 7066

15 September 1973 5	Shrewsbury Town	2–0	Rochdale	Shrewsbury
	Tarbuck 61'; Durban 88'	Report		Stadium: Gay Meadow; Attendance: 2516

17 September 1973 6	Rochdale	3–3	Bournemouth	Rochdale
	Hanvey; Skeete; Kinsella	Report	Machin; Boyer; Cave	Stadium: Spotland Stadium; Attendance: 2108

22 September 1973 7	Rochdale	2–2	Southport	Rochdale
	Darling 24'; Skeete 62'	Report	Lee 33'; Molyneux 77'	Stadium: Spotland Stadium; Attendance: 2380; Referee: PN Willis

29 September 1973 8	Southend United	1–2	Rochdale	Southend-on-Sea
	Johnson 10'	Report	Arnold 23'; Taylor 55' (pen.)	Stadium: Roots Hall; Attendance: 5039

3 October 1973 9	Bournemouth	2–0	Rochdale	Bournemouth
	Powell; Jones	Report		Stadium: Dean Court; Attendance: 8836

6 October 1973 10	Rochdale	1–1	Huddersfield Town	Rochdale
	Skeete 32'	Report	Hanvey 65' (o.g.)	Stadium: Spotland Stadium; Attendance: 3220

13 October 1973 11	Oldham Athletic	3–1	Rochdale	Oldham
	Edwards 14', 19'; Blair 43'	Report	Brennan 60'	Stadium: Boundary Park; Attendance: 7846

20 October 1973 12	Charlton Athletic	3–0	Rochdale	London
	Hales 20', 84'; Horsfield 88'	Report		Stadium: The Valley; Attendance: 5038

22 October 1973 13	Rochdale	1–3	Plymouth Argyle	Rochdale
	Downes	Report	Welsh; Davey; Marsh (o.g.)	Stadium: Spotland Stadium; Attendance: 1437

27 October 1973 14	Rochdale	1–1	Grimsby Town	Rochdale
	Skeete 86'	Report	Hubbard 63'	Stadium: Spotland Stadium; Attendance: 1549

3 November 1973 15	Port Vale	3–1	Rochdale	Stoke-on-Trent
	Williams 14', 64'; Woodward 84'	Report	Skeete 58'	Stadium: Vale Park; Attendance: 3223

10 November 1973 16	Rochdale	1–3	Watford	Rochdale
	Brogden 38'	Report	Farley 6'; Lindsay 80', 89'	Stadium: Spotland Stadium; Attendance: 1459

17 November 1973 17	Wrexham	3–0	Rochdale	Wrexham
	Davies 13'; Smallman 55'; May 69'	Report		Stadium: Racecourse Ground; Attendance: 3793

8 December 1973 18	Rochdale	1–2	Blackburn Rovers	Rochdale
	Brogden 28'	Report	Field 60' (pen.), 80'	Stadium: Spotland Stadium; Attendance: 3660

22 December 1973 19	Rochdale	1–1	Southend United	Rochdale
	Brogden 44'	Report	Guthrie 41'	Stadium: Spotland Stadium; Attendance: 1073

26 December 1973 20	Chesterfield	1–0	Rochdale	Chesterfield
	McHale	Report		Stadium: Saltergate Recreation Ground; Attendance: 5775

29 December 1973 21	Tranmere Rovers	1–1	Rochdale	Birkenhead
	Crossley	Report	Downes (pen.)	Stadium: Prenton Park; Attendance: 2766

1 January 1974 22	Rochdale	0–1	Walsall	Rochdale
		Report	Hanvey (o.g.)	Stadium: Spotland Stadium; Attendance: 2117; Referee: WB Johnson

5 January 1974 23	York City	2–1	Rochdale	York
	Jones 28'; Seal 81'	Report	Horne 30'	Stadium: Bootham Crescent; Attendance: 3923

12 January 1974 24	Rochdale	3–2	Shrewsbury Town	Rochdale
	Grummett 26'; Downes 58'; Skeete 68'	Report	Tarbuck 33'; Hughes	Stadium: Spotland Stadium; Attendance: 957

20 January 1974 25	Brighton & Hove Albion	2–1	Rochdale	Brighton and Hove
	Beamish; Towner	Report	Skeete	Stadium: Goldstone Ground; Attendance: 18900

26 January 1974 26	Grimsby Town	5–1	Rochdale	Cleethorpes
	Lewis 45'; Hubbard 60', 65'; Hickman 70', 81'	Report	Gowans 31'	Stadium: Blundell Park; Attendance: 5548

3 February 1974 27	Rochdale	1–3	York City	Rochdale
	Horne	Report	Jones; Seal	Stadium: Spotland Stadium; Attendance: 2205

5 February 1974 28	Rochdale	0–2	Cambridge United	Rochdale
		Report	Greenhalgh 31'; Simmons 46'	Stadium: Spotland Stadium; Attendance: 588

16 February 1974 29	Rochdale	1–3	Oldham Athletic	Rochdale
	Bebbington 85'	Report	Hicks 11'; Blair 48'; Lochhead 65'	Stadium: Spotland Stadium; Attendance: 5923

23 February 1974 30	Huddersfield Town	5–0	Rochdale	Huddersfield
	Lawson 53', 57'; Gowling 65', 84'; Summerill 81'	Report		Stadium: Leeds Road; Attendance: 5679

26 February 1974 31	Rochdale	1–1	Hereford United	Rochdale
	Brennan 59'	Report	Rudge 39'	Stadium: Spotland Stadium; Attendance: 1195

2 March 1974 32	Rochdale	1–2	Chesterfield	Rochdale
	Brennan 24'	Report	Bellamy 62'; Wilson 75'	Stadium: Spotland Stadium; Attendance: 1566

5 March 1974 33	Bristol Rovers	1–1	Rochdale	Bristol
	Bannister	Report	Bebbington	Stadium: Eastville Stadium; Attendance: 11188

10 March 1974 34	Southport	0–0	Rochdale	Southport
		Report		Stadium: Haig Avenue; Attendance: 1708

13 March 1974 35	Aldershot	4–0	Rochdale	Aldershot
	Howarth; Bell	Report		Stadium: Recreation Ground; Attendance: 1742

16 March 1974 36	Rochdale	1–1	Charlton Athletic	Rochdale
	Grummett 89'	Report	Dunn (red card) 71'; Powell 83'	Stadium: Spotland Stadium; Attendance: 850

23 March 1974 37	Watford	4–0	Rochdale	Watford
	Morrisey 20'; Scullion 25'; Jenkins 60', 69'	Report		Stadium: Vicarage Road; Attendance: 5616

25 March 1974 38	Rochdale	0–1	Bristol Rovers	Rochdale
		Report	Bannister	Stadium: Spotland Stadium; Attendance: 1499

30 March 1974 39	Rochdale	1–1	Port Vale	Rochdale
	Horne 33'	Report	Mountford 60'	Stadium: Spotland Stadium; Attendance: 982

3 April 1974 40	Hereford United	2–1	Rochdale	Hereford
	Ritchie 48'; Hinch 51'	Report	Hanvey 65'	Stadium: Edgar Street; Attendance: 6659

6 April 1974 41	Cambridge United	3–3	Rochdale	Cambridge
	Shinton 7', 22'; Cassidy 57'	Report	Carrick 25', 58'; Downes 80' (pen.)	Stadium: Abbey Stadium; Attendance: 2704

13 April 1974 42	Rochdale	0–0	Wrexham	Rochdale
		Report		Stadium: Spotland Stadium; Attendance: 1119

15 April 1974 43	Rochdale	2–2	Aldershot	Rochdale
	Bebbington; Skeete	Report	Brodie; Howarth	Stadium: Spotland Stadium; Attendance: 885

20 April 1974 44	Blackburn Rovers	3–1	Rochdale	Blackburn
	Hutchins 19'; Martin 58', 80'	Report	Carrick 10'	Stadium: Ewood Park; Attendance: 4517

22 April 1974 45	Halifax Town	1–0	Rochdale	Halifax
	Shanahan 88'	Report		Stadium: The Shay; Attendance: 1431

27 April 1974 46	Rochdale	1–1	Halifax Town	Rochdale
	Skeete 6'	Report	Smith 40'	Stadium: Spotland Stadium; Attendance: 1320

=== F.A. Cup ===
24 November 1973 1	Rochdale	2–0	South Shields	Rochdale
	Marsh 18'; Brogden 21'	Report		Stadium: Spotland Stadium; Attendance: 1554

15 December 1973 2	Grantham Town	1–1	Rochdale	Grantham
	Benskin 15'	Report	Brogden 76'	Stadium: London Road; Attendance: 3224

18 December 1973 2	Rochdale	3–5 (a.e.t.)	Grantham Town	Rochdale
	Taylor; Downes; Hanvey	Report	Brent Horobin; Brian Norris; Mick Chambers	Stadium: Spotland Stadium; Attendance: 1266

=== League Cup ===
29 August 1973 1	Rochdale	5–3	Hartlepool United	Rochdale
	Darling; Atkins; Skeete; Taylor; Embleton (o.g.)	Report	Gauden; McMahon	Stadium: Spotland Stadium; Attendance: 1856

10 October 1973 2	Rochdale	0–4	Bolton Wanderers	Rochdale
		Report	Jones; Lee; Waldron	Stadium: Spotland Stadium; Attendance: 7241; Referee: HP Hackney

=== Lancashire Cup ===
15 October 1973	Bolton Wanderers	4–0	Rochdale	Bolton
	Goal			Stadium: Burnden Park
