= 1976–77 Rochdale A.F.C. season =

English football club season

Rochdale
1976–77 season
- Manager: Brian Green
- League Division Four: 18th
- FA Cup: 1st Round
- League Cup: 1st Round
- Top goalscorer: League: Bob Mountford; All: Bob Mountford

The 1976–77 season was Rochdale A.F.C.'s 70th in existence and their 3rd consecutive in the Football League Fourth Division

== Statistics ==
No.	Pos	Nat	Player	Total		Division 4		F.A. Cup		League Cup	
No.	Pos	Nat	Player	Apps	Goals	Apps	Goals	Apps	Goals	Apps	Goals
	GK	(England) ENG	Mike Poole	49	0	44+0	0	3+0	0	2+0	0
	DF	(England) ENG	Paul Hallows	51	0	46+0	0	3+0	0	2+0	0
	MF	(England) ENG	Tony Lacey	47	0	42+0	0	3+0	0	2+0	0
	DF	(England) ENG	Keith Hanvey	21	4	19+0	4	0+0	0	2+0	0
	DF	(England) ENG	Bill Summerscales	49	2	44+0	2	3+0	0	2+0	0
	MF	(England) ENG	Nigel O'Loughlin	49	4	42+2	4	3+0	0	2+0	0
	MF	(England) ENG	Dave Helliwell	34	4	20+11	3	2+0	1	1+0	0
	FW	(England) ENG	Steve Melledew	48	7	42+1	6	3+0	0	2+0	1
	FW	(England) ENG	Tony Whelan	39	4	34+0	4	3+0	0	2+0	0
	MF	(England) ENG	Phil Mullington	45	4	34+7	4	2+0	0	2+0	0
	MF	(England) ENG	Alan Tarbuck	27	2	22+0	1	3+0	1	2+0	0
	DF	(England) ENG	Billy Boslem	16	0	13+0	0	3+0	0	0+0	0
	FW	(England) ENG	Bob Mountford	36	11	33+1	11	1+0	0	1+0	0
	DF	(England) ENG	Dick Mulvaney	5	0	4+1	0	0+0	0	0+0	0
	FW	(England) ENG	Gary Cooper	24	5	17+5	5	1+1	0	0+0	0
	DF	(England) ENG	Ian Bannon	23	0	23+0	0	0+0	0	0+0	0
	DF	(England) ENG	Stuart Mason	2	0	2+0	0	0+0	0	0+0	0
	MF	(England) ENG	George Hamstead	4	0	3+1	0	0+0	0	0+0	0
	FW	(England) ENG	John Dungworth	14	3	14+0	3	0+0	0	0+0	0
	MF	(England) ENG	Jimmy Mullen	8	1	6+2	1	0+0	0	0+0	0
	GK	(England) ENG	Chris Shyne	2	0	2+0	0	0+0	0	0+0	0

== Final League Table ==
Pos	Team	Pld	W	D	L	GF	GA	GD	Pts
16	Torquay United	46	17	9	20	59	67	−8	43
17	Aldershot	46	16	11	19	49	59	−10	43
18	Rochdale	46	13	12	21	50	59	−9	38
19	Newport County	46	14	10	22	42	58	−16	38
20	Scunthorpe United	46	13	11	22	49	73	−24	37

== Competitions ==
=== Football League Fourth Division ===
21 August 1976 1	Scunthorpe United	0–1	Rochdale	Scunthorpe
		Report	Mountford 16'	Stadium: Old Show Ground; Attendance: 3536

23 August 1976 2	Rochdale	2–2	Cambridge United	Rochdale
	Hanvey 45' (pen.); Mullington 74'	Report	Horsfall 50'; Howard 76'	Stadium: Spotland Stadium; Attendance: 1716

28 August 1976 3	Rochdale	1–0	Colchester United	Rochdale
	Hanvey 63'	Report		Stadium: Spotland Stadium; Attendance: 1440

4 September 1976 4	Halifax Town	0–0	Rochdale	Halifax
		Report		Stadium: The Shay; Attendance: 2003

11 September 1976 5	Exeter City	2–1	Rochdale	Exeter
	Beer 10'; Kellow 39'	Report	Hanvey 47' (pen.)	Stadium: St James Park; Attendance: 2829

18 September 1976 6	Rochdale	3–1	Watford	Rochdale
	O'Loughlin 8'; Mullington 65'; Melledew 80'	Report	Joslyn 85'	Stadium: Spotland Stadium; Attendance: 1760

25 September 1976 7	Crewe Alexandra	1–1	Rochdale	Crewe
	Purdie 35'	Report	Hanvey 44'	Stadium: Gresty Road; Attendance: 2454

2 October 1976 8	Rochdale	0–0	Bournemouth	Rochdale
		Report		Stadium: Spotland Stadium; Attendance: 1807

9 October 1976 9	Workington	0–2	Rochdale	Workington
		Report	Mullington 34'; Mountford 73'	Stadium: Borough Park; Attendance: 1423

16 October 1976 10	Rochdale	0–0	Southend United	Rochdale
		Report		Stadium: Spotland Stadium; Attendance: 2302

23 October 1976 11	Hartlepool United	2–0	Rochdale	Hartlepool
	Scaife 61'; Reed 90' (pen.)	Report		Stadium: Victoria Park; Attendance: 1492

27 October 1976 12	Aldershot	0–2	Rochdale	Aldershot
		Report	O'Loughlin; Whelan	Stadium: Recreation Ground; Attendance: 4654

30 October 1976 13	Rochdale	1–0	Doncaster Rovers	Rochdale
	Mountford 30'	Report		Stadium: Spotland Stadium; Attendance: 2436

1 November 1976 14	Rochdale	2–2	Darlington	Rochdale
	Summerscales; Tarbuck	Report	Rowles; Holbrook	Stadium: Spotland Stadium; Attendance: 2577; Referee: D Shaw

6 November 1976 15	Southport	1–1	Rochdale	Southport
	Taylor 50'	Report	Whelan 18'	Stadium: Haig Avenue; Attendance: 1729

13 November 1976 16	Rochdale	0–0	Newport County	Rochdale
		Report		Stadium: Spotland Stadium; Attendance: 2842

26 November 1976 17	Huddersfield Town	2–1	Rochdale	Huddersfield
	Johnson (pen.); Jones	Report	Cooper	Stadium: Leeds Road; Attendance: 5240

27 December 1976 18	Rochdale	0–1	Bradford City	Rochdale
		Report	Dolan 75'	Stadium: Spotland Stadium; Attendance: 2942

29 December 1976 19	Stockport County	0–1	Rochdale	Stockport
		Report	Mountford	Stadium: Edgeley Park; Attendance: 3842

8 January 1977 20	Rochdale	1–0	Swansea City	Rochdale
	Cooper 43'	Report		Stadium: Spotland Stadium; Attendance: 1436

11 January 1977 21	Doncaster Rovers	2–0	Rochdale	Doncaster
	Kitchen (pen.); Miller	Report		Stadium: Belle Vue; Attendance: 3008

15 January 1977 22	Cambridge United	0–0	Rochdale	Cambridge
		Report		Stadium: Abbey Stadium; Attendance: 3607

22 January 1977 23	Rochdale	5–0	Scunthorpe United	Rochdale
	Peacock 25' (o.g.); Melledew 40'; O'Loughlin 44'; Cooper 84', 88'	Report		Stadium: Spotland Stadium; Attendance: 1640

25 January 1977 24	Rochdale	2–3	Barnsley	Rochdale
	Mountford; Mullington	Report	Peachey; Joicey; Mountford (o.g.)	Stadium: Spotland Stadium; Attendance: 2474

29 January 1977 25	Torquay United	2–0	Rochdale	Torquay
	Lee 1'; Brown 88'	Report		Stadium: Plainmoor; Attendance: 2453

5 February 1977 26	Colchester United	1–0	Rochdale	Colchester
	Dowman	Report		Stadium: Layer Road; Attendance: 4943

12 February 1977 27	Rochdale	4–1	Halifax Town	Rochdale
	Summerscales 25'; Cooper 38'; Helliwell 79'; Mountford 85'	Report	Bullock 8'	Stadium: Spotland Stadium; Attendance: 2255

19 February 1977 28	Rochdale	1–2	Exeter City	Rochdale
	Whelan 75' (pen.)	Report	Weeks 36'; Beer 77'	Stadium: Spotland Stadium; Attendance: 1523

22 February 1977 29	Brentford	3–2	Rochdale	Brentford
	Johnson 48'; Phillips 67'; Sweetzer 80'	Report	Melledew 32'; Helliwell 90'	Stadium: Griffin Park; Attendance: 3307

26 February 1977 30	Watford	3–1	Rochdale	Watford
	Mercer 4', 48'; Bond 9' (pen.)	Report	Melledew 85'	Stadium: Vicarage Road; Attendance: 6331

1 March 1977 31	Rochdale	3–0	Southport	Rochdale
	Whelan; Melledew	Report		Stadium: Spotland Stadium; Attendance: 1153

5 March 1977 32	Rochdale	0–1	Crewe Alexandra	Rochdale
		Report	Mayman	Stadium: Spotland Stadium; Attendance: 1609

12 March 1977 33	Bournemouth	1–1	Rochdale	Bournemouth
	Howarth 19'	Report	Dungworth 65'	Stadium: Dean Court; Attendance: 3400

19 March 1977 34	Rochdale	0–3	Workington	Rochdale
		Report	Coleman 17'; Prudham 43'; Kisby 80'	Stadium: Spotland Stadium; Attendance: 1737; Referee: DT Richardson

25 March 1977 35	Southend United	3–0	Rochdale	Southend-on-Sea
	Townsend 52'; Hadley 81'; Moody 85' (pen.)	Report		Stadium: Roots Hall; Attendance: 5677

2 April 1977 36	Rochdale	0–1	Hartlepool United	Rochdale
		Report	Cunningham 14'	Stadium: Spotland Stadium; Attendance: 858

6 April 1977 37	Bradford City	3–0	Rochdale	Bradford
	Hutchins 6'; McGinley 49'; Cooke 59'	Report		Stadium: Valley Parade; Attendance: 5263

9 April 1977 38	Rochdale	1–1	Stockport County	Rochdale
	Mountford 83'	Report	McBeth 60'	Stadium: Spotland Stadium; Attendance: 1489

12 April 1977 39	Darlington	0–2	Rochdale	Darlington
		Report	Dungworth; O'Loughlin	Stadium: Feethams; Attendance: 2586

16 April 1977 40	Rochdale	2–1	Aldershot	Rochdale
	Earls 37' (o.g.); Helliwell 41'	Report	Morrissey 87'	Stadium: Spotland Stadium; Attendance: 1038

23 April 1977 41	Newport County	3–0	Rochdale	Newport
	Woods 32', 47', 89' (pen.)	Report		Stadium: Somerton Park; Attendance: 2206

26 April 1977 42	Rochdale	0–1	Torquay United	Rochdale
		Report	Brown	Stadium: Spotland Stadium; Attendance: 852

30 April 1977 43	Rochdale	2–2	Huddersfield Town	Rochdale
	Mountford 33', 65'	Report	Baines 31'; Campbell 86'	Stadium: Spotland Stadium; Attendance: 1626

3 May 1977 44	Swansea City	3–2	Rochdale	Swansea
	Curtis 20', 80'; Charles 23'	Report	Mountford 73', 88'	Stadium: Vetch Field; Attendance: 10689

7 May 1977 45	Barnsley	2–0	Rochdale	Barnsley
	Joicey 14'; Warnock 76'	Report		Stadium: Oakwell; Attendance: 2531

14 May 1977 46	Rochdale	2–3	Brentford	Rochdale
	Dungworth 30'; Mullen 60'	Report	Shrubb 50'; McCulloch 53'; Phillips 70'	Stadium: Spotland Stadium; Attendance: 977

=== F.A. Cup ===
20 November 1977 1	Rochdale	1–1	Northwich Victoria	Rochdale
	Helliwell 60'	Report	Nieman 71'	Stadium: Spotland Stadium; Attendance: 3641

22 November 1977 1	Northwich Victoria	0–0 (a.e.t.)	Rochdale	Northwich
		Report		Stadium: Drill Field; Attendance: 4273

29 November 1977 1	Northwich Victoria	2–1	Rochdale	Manchester
	Collier; Smith	Report	Tarbuck	Stadium: Maine Road; Attendance: 4909

=== League Cup ===
14 August 1977 1	Rochdale	0–1	Blackburn Rovers	Rochdale
		Report	Svarc 52'	Stadium: Spotland Stadium; Attendance: 3547

18 August 1977 1	Blackburn Rovers	4–1 (5–1 agg.)	Rochdale	Blackburn
	Hird; Beamish; Svarc	Report	Melledew	Stadium: Ewood Park; Attendance: 5232
