= 1982 West Adelaide SC season =

West Adelaide
1982 season
- Head Coach: Alan Vest
- Stadium: Pratten Park
- National Soccer League: 9th
- NSL Cup: Quarter-finals
- Top goalscorer: Graham Honeyman (14)
- Highest home attendance: 8,325 vs. Adelaide City (H) (16 May 1982); National Soccer League
- Lowest home attendance: 2,500 (four matches)
- Average home league attendance: 3,546
- Biggest win: 4–0 vs. Wollongong City (H) (28 February 1982); National Soccer League; 4–0 vs. Heidelberg United (H) (2 May 1982); National Soccer League; 5–1 vs. Preston Makedonia (H) (30 May 1982); National Soccer League
- Biggest defeat: 2–5 vs. Sydney City (A) (5 September 1982); National Soccer League

The 1982 season was the sixth in the National Soccer League for West Adelaide Soccer Club. In addition to the domestic league, they also participated in the NSL Cup. West Adelaide finished 9th in their National Soccer League season, and were eliminated in the quarter-finals of the NSL Cup.

== Players ==
Note: Flags indicate national team as defined under FIFA eligibility rules; some limited exceptions apply. Players may hold more than one non-FIFA nationality.

No.	Pos.	Nation	Player
—	MF	AUS	Steve Atsalas
—	MF	NZL	Allan Boath
—	GK	AUS	Frank Boetel
—	FW	ENG	Micky Brennan
—	MF	AUS	Tim Brown
—	GK	AUS	Martyn Crook
—	MF	AUS	David Doorne
—	DF	AUS	Robbie Dunn
—	FW	ENG	Graham Heys
—	FW	SCO	Graham Honeyman
—	FW	AUS	George Koulianos

No.	Pos.	Nation	Player
—		AUS	Paul Kounas
—	FW	ANG	Lopez Manecas
—	DF	YUG	Zoran Maricic
—	MF	SCO	Neil McGachey
—	MF	SCO	Ian McGregor
—	DF	SCO	Ian McKie
—	MF	AUS	Adrian Santrac
—	FW	AUS	Bill Stefanopoulos
—	MF	NZL	Steve Sumner
—	DF	AUS	Tom Totsikas
—	FW	SCO	Jim Wright

== Competitions ==
=== Overall record ===
Competition	First match	Last match	Starting round	Final position	Record							
Competition	First match	Last match	Starting round	Final position	Pld	W	D	L	GF	GA	GD	Win %
National Soccer League	14 February 1982	5 September 1982	Matchday 1	9th	30	10	8	12	44	40	+4	33.33
NSL Cup	14 June 1982	14 July 1982	First round	Second round	2	1	0	1	3	3	+0	50.00
Total					32	11	8	13	47	43	+4	34.38

Source: Competitions

=== National Soccer League ===
==== League table ====
Pos	Team	Pld	W	D	L	GF	GA	GD	Pts	Relegation
1	Sydney City (C)	30	20	5	5	68	28	+40	45	Qualification to Finals series (Note: The Finals series was not considered the championship for the 1982 National Soccer League.)
2	St George-Budapest	30	14	8	8	47	40	+7	36	Qualification to Finals series
3	Wollongong City	30	16	3	11	43	46	−3	35	Qualification to Finals series
4	Heidelberg United	30	13	8	9	42	37	+5	34	Qualification to Finals series
5	Preston Makedonia	30	12	10	8	45	41	+4	34	
6	South Melbourne	30	11	9	10	46	37	+9	31	
7	APIA Leichhardt	30	12	7	11	49	54	−5	31	
8	Sydney Olympic	30	12	6	12	52	42	+10	30	
9	West Adelaide	30	10	8	12	44	40	+4	28	
10	Marconi Fairfield	30	12	4	14	44	43	+1	28	
11	Brisbane Lions	30	10	8	12	39	42	−3	28	
12	Newcastle KB United	30	10	7	13	43	52	−9	27	
13	Adelaide City	30	6	12	12	36	44	−8	24	
14	Footscray JUST	30	5	14	11	34	46	−12	24	
15	Canberra City	30	7	10	13	37	54	−17	24	
16	Brisbane City	30	5	11	14	32	55	−23	21	

Source: rsssf.com
Rules for classification: 1) points; 2) goal difference; 3) number of goals scored.
(C) Champions

==== Results summary ====
Overall								Home						Away					
Pld	W	D	L	GF	GA	GD	Pts	W	D	L	GF	GA	GD	W	D	L	GF	GA	GD
30	10	8	12	44	40	+4	38	7	3	5	28	14	+14	3	5	7	16	26	−10

Source: worldfootball.net

==== Results by round ====
Round	1	2	3	4	5	6	7	8	9	10	11	12	13	14	15	16	17	18	19	20	21	22	23	24	25	26	27	28	29	30
Ground	H	A	H	A	H	A	A	H	A	H	A	H	A	H	A	H	A	H	A	H	H	A	H	A	H	A	H	A	H	A
Result	D	D	W	D	L	L	D	W	D	D	W	W	L	W	W	W	L	W	W	L	W	L	L	W	L	L	D	D	L	L
Position	11	10	5	4	9	10	9	9	9	9	6	5	9	6	5	4	4	3	4	6	3	5	5	4	6	8	8	8	8	9
Points	1	2	4	5	5	5	6	8	9	10	12	14	14	16	18	20	20	22	24	24	26	26	26	28	28	28	29	30	30	30

Source: worldfootball.net
A = Away; H = Home; W = Win; D = Draw; L = Loss

==== Matches ====
Win Draw Loss

14 February 1982 1	West Adelaide	0–0	Brisbane Lions	Adelaide
		Report		Stadium: Hindmarsh Stadium; Attendance: 2,500; Referee: Don Campbell

21 February 1982 2	Preston Makedonia	1–1	West Adelaide	Melbourne
	Ollerton 87'	Report	Wright 78' (pen.)	Stadium: B.T. Connor Reserve; Attendance: 3,700; Referee: Jim Fearn

28 February 1982 3	West Adelaide	4–0	Wollongong City	Adelaide
	Honeyman 40', 55', 68'; Heys 87'	Report		Stadium: Hindmarsh Stadium; Attendance: 3,365; Referee: Jim Rossis

7 March 1982 4	South Melbourne	2–2	West Adelaide	Melbourne
	Campbell 68'; Egan 90+2'	Report	Heys 70'; Manecas 76'	Stadium: Middle Park Soccer Stadium; Attendance: 7,000; Referee: Chris Bambridge

14 March 1982 5	West Adelaide	0–2	Sydney City	Adelaide
		Report	Kosmina 55'; Cant 60'	Stadium: Hindmarsh Stadium; Attendance: 4,230; Referee: Ken Allen

21 March 1982 6	Sydney Olympic	3–1	West Adelaide	Sydney
	Rowden 14'; Redfern 56', 78'	Report	Brown 35'	Stadium: Pratten Park; Attendance: 3,488; Referee: Tony Boskovic

28 March 1982 7	APIA Leichhardt	0–0	West Adelaide	Sydney
		Report		Stadium: Lambert Park; Attendance: 4,219; Referee: Doug Rennie

4 April 1982 8	West Adelaide	3–0	Brisbane City	Adelaide
	Heys 67'; Brown 71'; Santrac 73'	Report		Stadium: Hindmarsh Stadium; Attendance: 4,100; Referee: Don Campbell

11 April 1982 9	Footscray JUST	2–2	West Adelaide	Melbourne
	Kojic 55'; Ilioski 65'	Report	Honeyman 66'; Santrac 67'	Stadium: Schintler Reserve; Attendance: 2,000; Referee: David Yelland

18 April 1982 10	West Adelaide	2–2	Canberra City	Adelaide
	Manecas 44'; Brown 75'	Report	Purdie 59'; T. Byrne 75'	Stadium: Hindmarsh Stadium; Attendance: 2,800; Referee: Bob Kerr

24 April 1982 11	Newcastle KB United	1–2	West Adelaide	Newcastle
	Senkalski 5'	Report	Honeyman 2', 33'	Stadium: Newcastle International Sports Centre; Attendance: 3,046; Referee: Jim Reeves

2 May 1982 12	West Adelaide	4–0	Heidelberg United	Adelaide
	Honeyman 12', 48'; Boath 35'; Sumner 78'	Report		Stadium: Hindmarsh Stadium; Attendance: 3,760; Referee: Jim Rossis

9 May 1982 13	St George-Budapest	2–0	West Adelaide	Sydney
	Slater 48'; Marton 83'	Report		Stadium: St George Stadium; Attendance: 3,654; Referee: Tim Davies

16 May 1982 14	West Adelaide	2–1	Adelaide City	Adelaide
	Honeyman 30'; Atsalas 85'	Report	J. Nyskohus 76'	Stadium: Hindmarsh Stadium; Attendance: 8,325; Referee: Don Campbell

23 May 1982 15	Marconi Fairfield	0–2	West Adelaide	Sydney
		Report	Dunn ?'; Honeyman 60'	Stadium: Marconi Stadium; Attendance: 2,699; Referee: Gary Power

30 May 1982 16	West Adelaide	5–1	Preston Makedonia	Adelaide
	Dunn 9'; Brennan 25'; Atsalas 38'; Heys 76', 89'	Report	Lucchesi 78'	Stadium: Hindmarsh Stadium; Attendance: 2,563; Referee: Jim Rossis

6 June 1982 17	Brisbane Lions	2–1	West Adelaide	Brisbane
	Sunderland 37', 41' (pen.)	Report	Honeyman 83' (pen.)	Stadium: Richlands Stadium; Attendance: 3,281; Referee: Col Amos

13 June 1982 18	West Adelaide	1–0	South Melbourne	Adelaide
	Brown 15'	Report		Stadium: Hindmarsh Stadium; Attendance: 4,200; Referee: Bob Kerr

20 June 1982 19	Wollongong City	2–0	West Adelaide	Wollongong
	Tredinnick 69'; Cotton 86'	Report		Stadium: Wollongong Showground; Attendance: 2,145; Referee: Tim Davies

27 June 1982 20	West Adelaide	0–1	Sydney Olympic	Adelaide
		Report	Redfern 30'	Stadium: Hindmarsh Stadium; Attendance: 3,600; Referee: Jim Rossis

4 July 1982 21	West Adelaide	5–2	APIA Leichhardt	Adelaide
	Dunn 11'; Manecas 50'; Boath 55'; Honeyman 63'; Heys 84'	Report	Giampaolo 25'; Kafka 89'	Stadium: Hindmarsh Stadium; Attendance: 3,250; Referee: Don Campbell

11 July 1982 22	Brisbane City	4–1	West Adelaide	Brisbane
	Bohan 20'; Hamilton 52'; Hermiston 81' (pen.); Conner 88'	Report	Honeyman 13'	Stadium: Spencer Park; Attendance: 1,800; Referee: Doug Rennie

18 July 1982 23	West Adelaide	0–1	Footscray JUST	Adelaide
		Report	Simic 47'	Stadium: Hindmarsh Stadium; Attendance: 3,000; Referee: Jim Rossis

25 July 1982 24	Canberra City	1–2	West Adelaide	Canberra
	Christopoulos 52'	Report	Honeyman 15'; Sumner 17'	Stadium: Bruce Stadium; Attendance: 1,500; Referee: Peter Rampley

1 August 1982 25	West Adelaide	1–2	Newcastle KB United	Adelaide
	Dunn 22'	Report	Lowe 25'; Senkalski 31'	Stadium: Hindmarsh Stadium; Attendance: 2,500; Referee: Bob Kerr

8 August 1982 26	Heidelberg United	1–0	West Adelaide	Melbourne
	Campbell 81'	Report		Stadium: Olympic Village; Attendance: 3,000; Referee: David Yelland

15 August 1982 27	West Adelaide	1–1	St George-Budapest	Adelaide
	Dunn 12'	Report	Marton 65' (pen.)	Stadium: Hindmarsh Stadium; Attendance: 2,500; Referee: Chris Bambridge

22 August 1982 28	Adelaide City	0–0	West Adelaide	Adelaide
		Report		Stadium: Olympic Sports Field; Attendance: 4,100; Referee: Jim Rossis

29 August 1982 29	West Adelaide	0–1	Marconi Fairfield	Adelaide
		Report	Djordjevic 9'	Stadium: Hindmarsh Stadium; Attendance: 2,500; Referee: Don Campbell

5 September 1982 30	Sydney City	5–2	West Adelaide	Sydney
	Kosmina 4', 45', 80'; Watson 53'; Borges 84'	Report	Manecas 26'; Atsalas 70'	Stadium: ES Marks Athletics Field; Attendance: 1,115; Referee: Richard Lorenc

=== NSL Cup ===
Win Draw Loss

14 June 1982 First round	West Adelaide	3–1 (a.e.t.)	Adelaide City	Adelaide
	Heys 56'; Honeyman 95'; Atsalas 97'	Report	Marocchi 44'	Stadium: Hindmarsh Stadium; Attendance: 3,900

14 July 1982 Second round	West Adelaide	0–2	Canberra City	Adelaide
		Report	Stone 38'; Christopoulos 86'	Stadium: Hindmarsh Stadium; Referee: Don Campbell

== Statistics ==
=== Appearances and goals ===
Includes all competitions. Players with no appearances not included in the list.

No.	Pos	Nat	Player	Total		National Soccer League		NSL Cup	
No.	Pos	Nat	Player	Apps	Goals	Apps	Goals	Apps	Goals
	MF	(Australia) AUS	Steve Atsalas	18	4	15+1	3	2	1
	MF	(Australia) AUS	Allan Boath	11	2	11	2	0	0
	GK	(Australia) AUS	Frank Boetel	2	0	1	0	1	0
	FW	(Australia) AUS	Micky Brennan	25	1	23+1	1	1	0
	MF	(England) ENG	Tim Brown	15	4	13+1	4	1	0
	GK	(Australia) AUS	Martyn Crook	30	0	29	0	1	0
	MF	(Australia) AUS	David Doorne	16	0	14+1	0	1	0
	DF	(Australia) AUS	Robbie Dunn	31	5	29	5	2	0
	FW	(England) ENG	Graham Heys	32	7	30	6	2	1
	FW	(Scotland) SCO	Graham Honeyman	32	15	30	14	2	1
	FW	(Australia) AUS	George Koulianos	4	0	4	0	0	0
		(Australia) AUS	Paul Kounas	2	0	0+1	0	0+1	0
	FW	(Angola) ANG	Lopez Manecas	10	0	8+1	0	1	0
	DF	(Socialist Federal Republic of Yugoslavia) YUG	Zoran Maricic	14	0	12+2	0	0	0
	MF	(Scotland) SCO	Neil McGachey	29	0	25+2	0	2	0
	MF	(Scotland) SCO	Ian McGregor	29	0	27	0	2	0
	DF	(Scotland) SCO	Ian McKie	12	0	9+1	0	2	0
	MF	(Australia) AUS	Adrian Santrac	11	2	9+1	2	0+1	0
	FW	(Australia) AUS	Bill Stefanopoulos	1	0	0+1	0	0	0
	MF	(Australia) AUS	Steve Sumner	13	2	12	2	1	0
	DF	(Australia) AUS	Tom Totsikas	27	0	26	0	1	0
	FW	(Scotland) SCO	Jim Wright	4	1	3+1	1	0	0

=== Disciplinary record ===
Includes all competitions. The list is sorted by squad number when total cards are equal. Players with no cards not included in the list.

No.	Pos	Nat	Player	Total			National Soccer League			NSL Cup		
No.	Pos	Nat	Player	Yellow card	Second yellow card	Red card	Yellow card	Second yellow card	Red card	Yellow card	Second yellow card	Red card
	FW	(England) ENG	Micky Brennan	5	0	2	5	0	2	0	0	0
	MF	(Australia) AUS	Allan Boath	1	0	1	1	0	1	0	0	0
	MF	(Scotland) SCO	Neil McGachey	3	0	0	3	0	0	0	0	0
	DF	(Australia) AUS	Robbie Dunn	2	0	0	2	0	0	0	0	0
	MF	(Scotland) SCO	Ian McGregor	2	0	0	2	0	0	0	0	0
	DF	(Australia) AUS	Tom Totsikas	2	0	0	2	0	0	0	0	0
	MF	(Australia) AUS	Steve Atsalas	1	0	0	1	0	0	0	0	0
	MF	(Australia) AUS	Tim Brown	1	0	0	1	0	0	0	0	0
	MF	(Australia) AUS	David Doorne	1	0	0	1	0	0	0	0	0
	FW	(Scotland) SCO	Graham Honeyman	1	0	0	1	0	0	0	0	0
	DF	(Socialist Federal Republic of Yugoslavia) YUG	Zoran Maricic	1	0	0	1	0	0	0	0	0
	FW	(Australia) AUS	George Koulianos	1	0	0	1	0	0	0	0	0
	MF	(Australia) AUS	Steve Sumner	1	0	0	1	0	0	0	0	0

- (yellow card) = Number of bookings; (second yellow card) = Number of sending offs after a second yellow card; (red card) = Number of sending offs by a direct red card.
