= 1974–75 Newport County A.F.C. season =

Welsh association football club season

Newport County
1974–75 season
- Manager: Brian Harris (until 15 March 1975); Billy Lucas (from 15 March 1975)
- Stadium: Somerton Park
- Fourth Division: 12th
- FA Cup: 2nd round
- League Cup: 2nd round
- Top goalscorer: League: Woods (21); All: Woods (21)
- Highest home attendance: 4,765 vs Walsall (FA Cup, 14 December 1974)
- Lowest home attendance: 1,535 vs Hartlepool (17 March 1975)
- Average home league attendance: 2,713
Home colours	Away colours	Third colours

The 1974–75 season was Newport County's 13th consecutive season in the Football League Fourth Division since relegation at the end of the 1961–62 season and their 47th overall in the Football League.

== Season review ==
County wore a plain tangerine and black kit until changing to a shirt with two wide shoulder stripes in early 1975 (listed as third kit here).

=== Results summary ===
Overall								Home						Away					
Pld	W	D	L	GF	GA	GAv	Pts	W	D	L	GF	GA	Pts	W	D	L	GF	GA	Pts
46	19	9	18	68	75	0.907	47	13	5	5	43	30	31	6	4	13	25	45	16

Source: rsssf.com

=== Results by round ===
Round	1	2	3	4	5	6	7	8	9	10	11	12	13	14	15	16	17	18	19	20	21	22	23	24	25	26	27	28	29	30	31	32	33	34	35	36	37	38	39	40	41	42	43	44	45	46
Ground	A	H	A	H	H	A	A	H	H	A	H	A	A	H	A	A	H	A	A	H	A	A	H	A	H	H	A	H	A	H	H	H	A	H	H	A	H	H	A	H	A	A	H	H	A	A
Result	L	W	W	W	L	L	W	W	W	L	L	W	L	W	W	D	D	D	W	W	W	L	W	L	W	W	D	D	L	L	L	D	L	L	W	L	W	W	D	W	L	L	D	D	L	L
Position	20	16	9	4	7	12	9	6	3	5	11	8	9	4	5	7	8	8	9	7	6	9	5	9	5	5	3	6	7	8	10	9	10	12	10	11	10	10	9	8	8	9	9	9	10	11

Updated to match(es) played on 25 Apr 1975. Source: statto.com
A = Away; H = Home; W = Win; D = Draw; L = Loss

== Fixtures and results ==
=== Fourth Division ===
Date	Opponents	Venue	Result	Scorers	Attendance
17 Aug 1974	Hartlepool	A	0–2		2,559
24 Aug 1974	Darlington	H	2–1	Godfrey, Hancock	2,707
31 Aug 1974	Doncaster Rovers	A	2–0	Jones 2	2,156
3 Sep 1974	Swansea City	H	3–0	Jones, Woods, Aizlewood	3,485
7 Sep 1974	Shrewsbury Town	H	2–4	Jones, Hooper	2,754
14 Sep 1974	Reading	A	0–3		6,360
18 Sep 1974	Bradford City	A	1–0	Jones	3,829
21 Sep 1974	Brentford	H	1–0	Godfrey	3,022
24 Sep 1974	Workington	H	3–1	Jones, Bell, Woods	3,250
28 Sep 1974	Barnsley	A	1–2	Woods	4,553
5 Oct 1974	Exeter City	H	1–2	Bell	3,130
12 Oct 1974	Crewe Alexandra	A	2–1	Jones, Woods	2,861
15 Oct 1974	Swansea City	A	0–2		3,372
18 Oct 1974	Northampton Town	H	2–1	Woods, Passey	2,155
26 Oct 1974	Rochdale	A	4–2	Jones 2, Godfrey, Woods	1,208
2 Nov 1974	Rotherham United	A	1–1	Woods	4,642
9 Nov 1974	Stockport County	H	3–3	Jones, Godfrey, Woods	2,634
16 Nov 1974	Cambridge United	A	1–1	Hooper	2,829
30 Nov 1974	Southport	A	3–1	Woods 2, Jones	1,314
7 Dec 1974	Scunthorpe United	H	2–0	Woodruff, Woods	3,139
21 Dec 1974	Torquay United	A	1–0	White	2,259
28 Dec 1974	Mansfield Town	A	0–3		7,920
4 Jan 1975	Bradford City	H	2–1	Woods, Woodruff	3,251
11 Jan 1975	Scunthorpe United	A	1–4	Woods	1,529
17 Jan 1975	Southport	H	1–0	Hooper	2,857
25 Jan 1975	Chester	H	3–0	Woods 2, Jones	4,144
31 Jan 1975	Stockport County	A	1–1	Jones	1,975
8 Feb 1975	Rotherham United	H	1–1	Woods	4,161
15 Feb 1975	Chester	A	1–4	Jones	5,427
22 Feb 1975	Cambridge United	H	1–2	Jones	3,219
28 Feb 1975	Doncaster Rovers	H	0–2		2,252
3 Mar 1975	Lincoln City	H	1–1	Godfrey	2,064
8 Mar 1975	Workington	A	1–3	Woods	1,248
15 Mar 1975	Barnsley	H	3–4	Woods, Parsons, OG	1,773
17 Mar 1975	Hartlepool	H	2–0	Woods, Woodruff	1,535
22 Mar 1975	Shrewsbury Town	A	0–1		3,465
29 Mar 1975	Torquay United	H	2–1	Woodruff, OG	2,139
31 Mar 1975	Mansfield Town	H	2–1	Woods, White	3,663
1 Apr 1975	Brentford	A	0–0		5,560
5 Apr 1975	Rochdale	H	3–2	Hooper 3	1,801
9 Apr 1975	Lincoln City	A	2–5	Parsons 2	5,613
12 Apr 1975	Exeter City	A	1–3	Woodruff	2,755
15 Apr 1975	Reading	H	2–2	Woodruff, Parsons	1,536
19 Apr 1975	Crewe Alexandra	H	1–1	Hancock	1,739
21 Apr 1975	Darlington	A	0–3		1,959
25 Apr 1975	Northampton Town	A	2–3	Parsons, Woods	2,482

=== FA Cup ===
Round	Date	Opponents	Venue	Result	Scorers	Attendance
1	23 Nov 1974	Exeter City	A	2–1	Hooper, White	4,202
2	14 Dec 1974	Walsall	H	1–3	Jones	4,765

=== Football League Cup ===
Round	Date	Opponents	Venue	Result	Scorers	Attendance
1	20 Aug 1974	Torquay United	H	1–0	Woodruff	3,022
2	11 Sep 1974	Chelsea	A	2–4	Woodruff, Brown	13,322

== League table ==
Pos	Team	Pld	W	D	L	GF	GA	GAv	Pts
10	Bradford City	46	17	13	16	56	51	1.098	47
11	Southport	46	15	17	14	56	56	1.000	47
12	Newport County	46	19	9	18	68	75	0.907	47
13	Hartlepool	46	16	11	19	52	62	0.839	43
14	Torquay United	46	14	14	18	46	61	0.754	42

Source: rsssf.com
