= Santrač =

Santrač (Serbian Cyrillic: Сантрач, pronounced [sântraːtʃ]) is a Serbian surname. Notable people with the surname include:

- Adrian Santrac (born 1958), Australian soccer coach and former soccer player
- Slobodan Santrač (1946–2016), Yugoslav and Serbian football manager and player
