= David Carrick =

English footballer (1946–1989)

Personal information
- Full name: Matthew David Carrick
- Date of birth: 5 December 1946
- Place of birth: Evenwood, England
- Date of death: 1 July 1989 (aged 42)
- Place of death: Mansfield, England
- Height: 5 ft 7 in (1.70 m)
- Position: Forward

Youth career
- 1964–1966: Wolverhampton Wanderers

Senior career*
| Years | Team | Apps | (Gls) |
| 1966–1968 | Wrexham | 24 | (3) |
| 1968–1969 | Altrincham | 27 | (4) |
| 1969 | Port Vale | 16 | (1) |
| 1969 | Stalybridge Celtic | | |
| 1969–1973 | Witton Albion | | |
| 1973 | Preston North End | 2 | (0) |
| 1973–1975 | Rochdale | 26 | (4) |
| 1975–1976 | Altrincham | 11 | (1) |
| 1976–1977 | Droylsden | | |
| 1977–1978 | Middlewich Athletic | | |
| 1978–1979 | Macclesfield Town | 27 | (4) |
| 1979–1980 | Oswestry Town | | |
- New Mills
- * Club domestic league appearances and goals

Matthew David Carrick (5 December 1946 – 1 July 1989) was an English footballer who played as a forward for Wolverhampton Wanderers, Wrexham, Altrincham, Port Vale, Stalybridge Celtic, Witton Albion, Preston North End, Rochdale, Middlewich Athletic, Macclesfield Town, Droylsden, Oswestry Town, and New Mills. He made a total of 68 appearances in the English Football League, and also played in the Northern Premier League and Cheshire County League.

== Career ==
Carrick began his career at Ronnie Allen's Wolverhampton Wanderers; he signed in December 1964 but never made a first-team appearance at Molineux. On 1 July 1966, he joined Jack Rowley's Fourth Division side Wrexham for a "small fee". He made his debut on the opening day of the 1966–67 season, in a 0–0 draw with Exeter City. He was dropped after the following game, before returning to the starting eleven for an FA Cup tie with Chesterfield in which he scored the opening goal of a 3–2 victory. He was not selected for the final of the Welsh Cup, despite playing in all the previous rounds. His first-team opportunities were limited in the 1967–68 season, and new manager Alvan Williams allowed him to leave the Racecourse Ground.

Carrick signed with Cheshire County League side Altrincham in March 1968. He scored on his home debut at Moss Lane, in a 5–2 win over Runcorn. He played both legs of the North West Floodlit League final defeat to Macclesfield Town. Altrincham then moved into the Northern Premier League and Carrick featured in FA Cup ties with Wigan Athletic and Crewe Alexandra, greatly impressing scouts from the Football League with his performances in the first half of the 1968–69 season. He signed with Port Vale in January 1969. He played in 16 consecutive Fourth Division games at the end of the 1968–69 season, but only scored the one goal – in a 4–1 win over Brentford at Vale Park on 15 March, before being released in the summer.

He moved on to Cheshire County League sides Stalybridge Celtic and Witton Albion, making his debut for Witton on 9 August 1969. He scored 20 goals in 57 games in the 1969–70 season, 31 goals from 63 games in the 1970–71 season, 29 goals from 61 starts in the 1971–72 campaign, 14 goals in 52 games in the 1972–73 season, and another three goals from eight games at the start of the 1973–74 campaign. He returned to the Football League after being signed by Preston North End for a £500 fee in November 1973. He played two Second Division games at Deepdale before moving on to already-relegated Third Division side Rochdale in March 1974. Walter Joyce's "Dale" suffered relegation in last place at the end of the 1973–74 campaign, with Carrick scoring the only brace of the season during a 3–3 draw at Cambridge United. Rochdale dropped to 19th in the Fourth Division in 1974–75. Carrick scored four goals in 26 league games during his two-season stay at Spotland. He then returned to Altrincham, back in the Northern Premier League. He signed with Droylsden in October 1976 but was transfer-listed in March 1977.

After a spell with Middlewich Athletic, he signed with Macclesfield Town and made his debut for the "Silkmen" away at Goole Town on 21 March 1978. He scored ten goals for the club in the final ten games of the 1977–78 season, before scoring two goals in 19 appearances in the 1978–79 season as Macclesfield finished bottom of the Northern Premier League. He went on to play for Oswestry Town (July 1979) and New Mills.

== Style of play ==
Carrick was described as a "fast constructive player who liked to be fully involved".

== Death ==
Carrick was diagnosed with motor neuron disease and died on 1 July 1989, aged 42.

== Career statistics ==
Appearances and goals by club, season and competition
| Club | Season | League | | | FA Cup | | Other | | Total | |
| Club | Season | Division | Apps | Goals | Apps | Goals | Apps | Goals | Apps | Goals |
|---|---|---|---|---|---|---|---|---|---|---|
| Wrexham | 1966–67 | Fourth Division | 19 | 3 | 2 | 1 | 1 | 0 | 22 | 4 |
| Wrexham | 1967–68 | Fourth Division | 5 | 0 | 1 | 0 | 1 | 0 | 7 | 0 |
| Wrexham | Total | | 24 | 3 | 3 | 1 | 2 | 0 | 29 | 4 |
| Altrincham | 1967–68 | Cheshire County League | 11 | 3 | 0 | 0 | 2 | 0 | 13 | 3 |
| Altrincham | 1968–69 | Northern Premier League | 16 | 1 | 2 | 0 | 9 | 1 | 27 | 2 |
| Altrincham | Total | | 27 | 4 | 2 | 0 | 11 | 1 | 40 | 5 |
| Port Vale | 1968–69 | Fourth Division | 16 | 1 | 0 | 0 | 0 | 0 | 16 | 1 |
| Witton Albion | 1969–70 | Cheshire County League | | | | | | | 57 | 20 |
| Witton Albion | 1970–71 | Cheshire County League | | | | | | | 63 | 31 |
| Witton Albion | 1971–72 | Cheshire County League | | | | | | | 61 | 29 |
| Witton Albion | 1972–73 | Cheshire County League | | | | | | | 52 | 14 |
| Witton Albion | Total | | | | | | | | 233 | 94 |
| Preston North End | 1973–74 | Second Division | 2 | 0 | 0 | 0 | 0 | 0 | 2 | 0 |
| Rochdale | 1973–74 | Third Division | 10 | 3 | 0 | 0 | 0 | 0 | 10 | 3 |
| Rochdale | 1974–75 | Fourth Division | 16 | 1 | 4 | 1 | 1 | 0 | 21 | 2 |
| Rochdale | Total | | 26 | 4 | 4 | 1 | 1 | 0 | 31 | 5 |
| Altrincham | 1976–76 | Northern Premier League | 11 | 1 | 1 | 0 | 3 | 0 | 15 | 0 |
| Macclesfield Town | 1977–78 | Northern Premier League | 10 | 2 | 0 | 0 | 0 | 0 | 10 | 2 |
| Macclesfield Town | 1978–79 | Northern Premier League | 17 | 2 | 1 | 0 | 1 | 0 | 19 | 2 |
| Macclesfield Town | Total | | 27 | 4 | 1 | 0 | 1 | 0 | 29 | 4 |
