= Trevor Womble =

English footballer

Personal information
- Date of birth: 7 June 1951 (age 75)
- Place of birth: South Shields, England
- Height: 5 ft 8 in (1.73 m)
- Position: Midfielder

Senior career*
Years	Team	Apps	(Gls)
1968–1978	Rotherham United	214	(39)
1971	Crewe Alexandra	4	(1)
1973	Halifax Town	10	(2)
Total		228	(42)
- * Club domestic league appearances and goals

Trevor Womble (born 7 June 1951 in South Shields) is an English former footballer who played in the Football League for Rotherham United, Crewe Alexandra and Halifax Town.

He began his footballing career as an apprentice with Rotherham United and was only 17 years old when he made his full debut in a 3–1 defeat to Stockport County in 1968. He was right footed and played in a midfield role. He was the second highest scorer in the Rotherham United team that won promotion from Division Four in 1974–75. He also spent spells on loan at Crewe Alexandra and Halifax Town, and retired in 1978 through injury.
