= Don Burluraux =

English footballer

Personal information
- Full name: Donald Burluraux
- Date of birth: 8 June 1951 (age 75)
- Place of birth: Skelton, England
- Height: 5 ft 10 in (1.78 m)
- Position: Winger

Youth career
- –: Staithes Juniors
- –: Middlesbrough

Senior career*
Years	Team	Apps	(Gls)
1970–1972	Middlesbrough	5	(0)
1971–1972	→ York City (loan)	3	(1)
1972–1975	Darlington	112	(13)
–	Whitby Town		(28)

Managerial career
- 1978–1979: Whitby Town (player-manager)
- * Club domestic league appearances and goals

Donald Burluraux (born 8 June 1951) is an English former footballer who scored 12 goals from 120 appearances in the Football League playing as a winger for Middlesbrough, York City and Darlington in the 1970s. He went on to play non-League football for Whitby Town.

== Life and career ==
Burluraux was born in Skelton, which was then in the North Riding of Yorkshire, the son of Fred Burluraux, who had a brief professional career with Hartlepools United in the 1930s. He played youth football for Staithes Juniors before signing for Middlesbrough. He made his first-team debut in the 1970–71 Football League season, but after just five Second Division matches, he suffered badly torn ankle ligaments. After a brief spell on loan at York City, Burluraux signed for Fourth Division club Darlington. He was the club's player of the year in his first season, and played more than 100 times over three seasons, but the damage to his ankle forced his retirement from professional football at the age of 24.

He played for Northern League club Whitby Town until at least 1980, and was player-manager in the 1978–79 season.

After finishing with football, Burluraux worked for ICI as a quality control laboratory analyst, managed Redcar tourist information office, and acted as co-ordinator of a "walking for health" scheme for his local healthcare trust. Between 1999 and 2007 Burluraux ran the "North York Moors CAM" website which contains dozens of illustrated walks in and around the North York Moors.
