= Arthur Marsh (footballer) =

English footballer (1947–2020)

Personal information
- Full name: Arthur Marsh
- Date of birth: 4 May 1947
- Place of birth: Lower Gornal, England
- Date of death: 31 March 2020 (aged 72)
- Place of death: Bedfordshire, England
- Position: Central defender

Youth career
- Bolton Wanderers

Senior career*
Years	Team	Apps	(Gls)
1966–1971	Bolton Wanderers	73	(0)
1971–1974	Rochdale	90	(0)
1974–1975	Darlington	23	(1)
Total		186	(1)
- * Club domestic league appearances and goals

Arthur Marsh (4 May 1947 – 31 March 2020) was an English footballer who made 186 appearances in the Football League playing as a central defender for Bolton Wanderers, Rochdale and Darlington.

On 1 April 2020, his former club Bolton Wanderers announced that he had died at the age of 72.

In his later years, he suffered from Alzheimer's disease. He died in 2020, and left his wife Judith with two daughters Joanne and Liza.
