= Peter Gowans =

Scottish footballer

Personal information
- Full name: Peter Taylor Gowans
- Date of birth: 25 May 1944
- Place of birth: Dundee, Scotland
- Date of death: 17 November 2009 (aged 65)
- Place of death: Crewe, England
- Position: Winger

Senior career*
Years	Team	Apps	(Gls)
1960?–1963	Celtic	0	(0)
1963–1966	Crewe Alexandra	153	(47)
1966–1970	Aldershot	113	(27)
1970–1973	Rochdale	144	(21)
1973?	Southport	4	(0)
?	Nantwich Town		
Total		400+	(95+)

Managerial career
- ?: Nantwich Town (player/manager)
- * Club domestic league appearances and goals

Peter Taylor Gowans (25 May 1944 – 17 November 2009) was a Scottish football winger who played more than 400 Football League games for three English clubs.

He started his career with junior team Dundee Shamrock, moving to Celtic for the 1960/61 season. However, Gowans did not play a senior first team game for the Scottish giants, and he moved to Crewe Alexandra in 1963.

Nineteen-year-old Gowans was signed by Crewe manager Jimmy McGuigan. He went on to spend 3 seasons with the Railwaymen, scoring 47 league goals for them.

Gowans moved to Aldershot in 1966/67 and made over 100 League appearances for The Shots. In 1970, he moved back north with Rochdale, and Gowans made a total of 155 senior league and cup appearances for them, scoring 22 goals. Gowans played over 400 games in the English Football League spanning a 10-year career.

After his playing career he managed Nantwich Town whilst working for British Rail as a Clerical Officer in the Main Locomotive Erecting Shop at Crewe Locomotive Works.
