= Peter Hatch (footballer) =

English footballer

Personal information
- Full name: Peter Derek Hatch
- Date of birth: 22 October 1949 (age 77)
- Place of birth: Wargrave, England
- Positions: Left back; midfielder

Youth career
- Oxford United

Senior career*
Years	Team	Apps	(Gls)
1966–1973	Oxford United	19	(2)
1973–1982	Exeter City	346	(18)
1982–1983	Hamrun Spartans		
- Bideford
- Taunton Town
- Barnstaple Town
- Dawlish Town
- Crediton United
- Heavitree United
Total		365	(20)
- * Club domestic league appearances and goals

Peter Derek Hatch (born 22 October 1949) is an English retired professional footballer who played as a left back and midfielder.

== Career ==
Born in Wargrave, Hatch turned professional with Oxford United in October 1966, making 19 league appearances over the next seven years. He moved to Exeter City in December 1973, on the same day as Keith Bowker, who he also initially lived with, and went on to make 346 league appearances for the club. He was with the club as they finished runners-up in the 1976–77 Fourth Division, gaining promotion.

In 1982 he signed for Maltese club Hamrun Spartans, winning the national title during his first season with them.

After that season he returned to the UK, playing for a number of non-league clubs including Bideford, Taunton Town, Barnstaple Town, Dawlish Town, Crediton United and Heavitree United.

Exeter City gave him a testimonial match in October 1986, against first club Oxford United.

After retiring from football, Hatch worked as postman in the Exeter area.

In April 2018 he was inducted into the Exeter City Hall of Fame.
