= Jimmy Mullen (footballer, born 1947) =

English footballer

Personal information
- Full name: James Mullen
- Date of birth: 16 March 1947 (age 79)
- Place of birth: Oxford, England
- Position: Left winger

Senior career*
Years	Team	Apps	(Gls)
1965–1966	Oxford City		
1966–1968	Reading	8	(1)
1967–1969	Charlton Athletic	7	(0)
1969–1974	Rotherham United	177	(24)
1974–1976	Blackburn Rovers	10	(0)
1976–1977	Bury	4	(0)
1976–1977	→ Rochdale (loan)	8	(1)
1977–1978	Great Harwood		
Total		214	(26)
- * Club domestic league appearances and goals

James Mullen (born 16 March 1947) is an English footballer who played as a left winger in the Football League.
