= Martin Harris (footballer) =

English footballer

Personal information
- Full name: Martin Harris
- Date of birth: 22 December 1955 (age 70)
- Place of birth: Doncaster, England
- Position: Right winger

Youth career
- 19??–1974: Grimsby Town

Senior career*
Years	Team	Apps	(Gls)
1974–1977	Workington	106	(13)
1977–1978	Hartlepool United	1	(0)
1978–1981	Scarborough		
1981–198?	Burton Albion		
- Cleator Moor Celtic
- * Club domestic league appearances and goals

Martin Harris (born 22 December 1955) is an English former professional footballer who made 107 appearances in the Football League playing on the right wing for Workington and Hartlepool United. He was on the books of Grimsby Town as a youngster without playing for their league side, and also played non-league football for Scarborough, Burton Albion and Cleator Moor Celtic. He went on to manage clubs including Cleator Moor Celtic and Whitehaven Amateurs.

Harris was born in 1955 in Doncaster, which was then in the West Riding of Yorkshire.
