= Len Kinsella =

Scottish footballer

Personal information
- Full name: Leonard Kinsella
- Date of birth: 14 May 1946 (age 80)
- Place of birth: Alexandria, Scotland
- Position: Midfielder

Senior career*
| Years | Team | Apps | (Gls) |
| 1963–1970 | Burnley | 13 | (0) |
| 1970–1971 | Carlisle United | 13 | (0) |
| 1971–1974 | Rochdale | 85 | (4) |
- * Club domestic league appearances and goals

Leonard Kinsella (born 14 May 1946) is a Scottish retired professional footballer who played as a midfielder.
