= Ally Millar =

Scottish footballer

Personal information
- Full name: Alistair Millar
- Date of birth: 15 January 1952 (age 74)
- Place of birth: Glasgow, Scotland
- Height: 5 ft 7 1/2 in (1.71 m)
- Position: Midfielder

Youth career
- Benburb

Senior career*
Years	Team	Apps	(Gls)
1971	Hamilton Academical (trialist)	1	(1)
1971–1980	Barnsley	289	(17)
1980–1981	York City	12	(0)
- Phoenix Inferno (indoor)
- Baltimore Blast (indoor)
- Matlock Town
- Worksop Town
Total		301	(17)
- * Club domestic league appearances and goals

Alistair Millar (born 15 January 1952) is a Scottish former professional footballer who played as a midfielder in the Football League for Barnsley and York City, in non-League football for Matlock Town and Worksop Town, in Scottish junior football for Benburb, and in the United States for Phoenix Inferno and Baltimore Blast.
