= Mick Spelman =

English footballer

Personal information
- Full name: Michael Thomas Spelman
- Date of birth: 8 December 1950 (age 75)
- Place of birth: Newcastle upon Tyne, England
- Position: Midfielder

Senior career*
Years	Team	Apps	(Gls)
–	Whitley Bay		
1969–1971	Wolverhampton Wanderers	0	(0)
1971	Watford	0	(0)
1971–1977	Hartlepool United	121	(4)
1972–1973	→ Darlington (loan)	4	(0)
–	Chester-le-Street Garden Farm		
- * Club domestic league appearances and goals

Michael Thomas Spelman (born 8 December 1950), known as Mick or Mike Spelman, is an English former footballer who played as a midfielder in the Football League for Hartlepool United and Darlington. He was on the books of Wolverhampton Wanderers and Watford, without playing first-team football for either, and also played non-league football for Whitley Bay and Chester-le-Street Garden Farm. As a youngster, he played representative football for England Schools.
