= Fred Molyneux (footballer, born 1944) =

English footballer (1944–2019)

Personal information
- Date of birth: 25 July 1944
- Place of birth: Wallasey, England
- Date of death: 1 October 2019 (aged 75)
- Position: Central defender

Youth career
- 1962–1965: Liverpool

Senior career*
Years	Team	Apps	(Gls)
1965–1968	Southport	123	(1)
1968–1970	Plymouth Argyle	79	(5)
1970	→ Exeter City	2	(0)
1970–1972	Tranmere Rovers	72	(0)
1973–1974	Southport	33	(1)
- Wigan Athletic
Total		309	(7)
- * Club domestic league appearances and goals

Fred Molyneux (25 July 1944 – 1 October 2019) was an English professional footballer who played as a central defender in the Football League for Southport, Plymouth Argyle, Exeter City and Tranmere Rovers. He also spent two seasons with Wigan Athletic in the Northern Premier League, making 74 appearances.
