= Malcolm Darling =

Scottish footballer

Malcolm Darling (born 4 July 1947) is a Scottish former professional footballer. He was a winger who played for Blackburn Rovers, Norwich City, Rochdale, Bolton Wanderers, Chesterfield, Stockport County, Sheffield Wednesday, Hartlepool United and Bury.

Darling was a member of the Norwich City squad that won the second division championship in 1972.
