= Bob Mountford =

English footballer and manager (1952-2008)

Personal information
- Full name: Robert William Mountford
- Date of birth: 23 February 1952
- Place of birth: Stockton Brook, Stoke-on-Trent, England
- Date of death: 26 August 2008 (aged 56)
- Place of death: Australia
- Height: 5 ft 11 in (1.80 m)
- Position: Forward

Youth career
- Brown Edge
- Port Vale

Senior career*
Years	Team	Apps	(Gls)
1969–1974	Port Vale	81	(9)
1974	→ Scunthorpe United (loan)	3	(0)
1974	→ Crewe Alexandra (loan)	5	(0)
1974–1977	Rochdale	98	(37)
1977–1978	Huddersfield Town	14	(4)
1978–1980	Halifax Town	62	(11)
1980	Crewe Alexandra	3	(0)
1980–1981	Stockport County	7	(3)
- Newcastle KB United
- Brisbane City FC
- Blacktown City
Total		273+	(64+)

Managerial career
- Azzuri
- 2007–2008: Adamstown Rosebud
- * Club domestic league appearances and goals

Robert William Mountford (23 February 1952 – 26 August 2008) was an English footballer who played 277 matches in the Football League for various clubs, scoring 64 goals.

He debuted for Port Vale in April 1969 and became a first-team regular after signing professional forms in February 1970. He was loaned out to Scunthorpe United and Crewe Alexandra in 1974 before he joined Rochdale for £2,000 in December of that year. He scored 41 goals in 117 league and cup games before moving on to Huddersfield Town in 1977. He switched to Halifax Town the following year before joining Stockport County via Crewe Alexandra in 1980. He emigrated to Australia the following year and played and coached at numerous teams, including Newcastle KB United, Brisbane City FC, and Adamstown Rosebud. He became a prison warder at Cessnock Correctional Centre in 1988.

== Playing career ==
As a youth, he played for local village team Brown Edge before being spotted by Stanley Matthews and persuaded to join Port Vale juniors. He graduated through the Vale youth set-up to make his first team debut as a substitute in a 2–0 defeat at Doncaster Rovers on 19 April 1969. Signing professional forms under Gordon Lee in February 1970, he made his full debut in a 2–0 defeat by Shrewsbury Town at Vale Park in a League Cup first round match on 18 August 1971. The young striker was gradually broken into the team over the 1971–72 and 1972–73 seasons.

"Bob was a promising young player and I had high hopes for him. He had all the ingredients of being a good player. He had a good shape, was mobile and good in the air and had a good shot. He was a good athlete and looked a player. Bob was a local lad who wanted to succeed and I thought he would do well."

— Manager Gordon Lee speaking after Mountford's death.

He was a regular in the 1973–74 side that battled against relegation from the Third Division. The following season saw the Vale push for promotion under Roy Sproson's stewardship, with Ray Williams, Brian Horton and new signing Terry Bailey providing 41 goals between them. Unable to establish himself in the new set-up, Mountford joined Fourth Division strugglers Scunthorpe United on a one-month loan in October 1974. That December he joined Crewe Alexandra, another side failing to find the net. He made five appearances for the "Alex" before being sold to Walter Joyce's Rochdale for £2,000 later in the month.

The "big, bustling, old fashioned, centre forward" was in his element at Spotland. The 1975–76 and 1976–77 seasons were spent in mid-table obscurity in the basement division, but with 41 goals in 117 games, Mountford was a sensation for the club.

He moved on to Huddersfield Town in September 1977 for £10,000 but struggled with injuries at Leeds Road. The 1977–78 season saw the "Terriers" performing comfortably in the Fourth Division under Tom Johnston's stewardship, but Rochdale missed Mountford's goals – they finished bottom with 24 points and 43 goals scored.

In 1978, he joined George Kirby's Halifax Town, another club at the foot of the Football League. The 1978–79 and 1979–80 seasons were difficult, with Mountford bagging eleven goals from 62 league games.

In 1980, he joined Tony Waddington's Crewe Alexandra permanently but played just three games before joining Stockport County later in the year. He scored three goals in nine league games for Jimmy McGuigan's "Hatters" during the 1980–81 season.

== Coaching career ==
After leaving Stockport, Mountford emigrated to Australia, playing for Newcastle KB United, also serving as their assistant coach. After a spell with Brisbane City FC and Blacktown he was appointed assistant coach and youth coach at Newcastle Breakers. He later coached Azzuri, Newcastle-Port Stephens juniors and Edgeworth under 19s. In April 2007, he took charge at Adamstown Rosebud and was still at the helm at the time of his death.

He joined the Prison Service in 1988, whilst still coaching, becoming a warden at Cessnock Correctional Centre in Cessnock, New South Wales.

Mountford died on 26 August 2008 in Australia following a lengthy battle against cancer. He was survived by his wife and their two children; Paul and Anna.

== Career statistics ==
Appearances and goals by club, season and competition
Club	Season	League			FA Cup		League Cup		Total	
Club	Season	Division	Apps	Goals	Apps	Goals	Apps	Goals	Apps	Goals
Port Vale	1968–69	Fourth Division	1	0	0	0	0	0	1	0
Port Vale	1969–70	Fourth Division	0	0	0	0	0	0	0	0
Port Vale	1970–71	Third Division	1	0	0	0	0	0	1	0
Port Vale	1971–72	Third Division	21	3	3	0	1	0	25	3
Port Vale	1972–73	Third Division	17	2	1	0	2	0	20	2
Port Vale	1973–74	Third Division	38	4	4	1	1	0	43	5
Port Vale	1974–75	Third Division	3	0	2	1	0	0	5	1
Port Vale	Total		81	9	10	2	4	0	95	11
Scunthorpe United (loan)	1974–75	Fourth Division	3	0	0	0	0	0	3	0
Crewe Alexandra (loan)	1974–75	Fourth Division	5	0	0	0	0	0	5	0
Rochdale	1974–75	Fourth Division	16	10	0	0	0	0	16	10
Rochdale	1975–76	Fourth Division	44	14	7	3	2	0	53	17
Rochdale	1976–77	Fourth Division	34	12	1	0	1	0	36	12
Rochdale	1977–78	Fourth Division	4	1	0	0	3	1	7	2
Rochdale	Total		98	37	8	3	6	1	112	41
Huddersfield Town	1977–78	Fourth Division	14	4	0	0	0	0	14	4
Halifax Town	1977–78	Fourth Division	10	3	0	0	0	0	10	3
Halifax Town	1978–79	Fourth Division	26	4	1	0	0	0	27	4
Halifax Town	1979–80	Fourth Division	26	4	2	0	2	1	30	5
Halifax Town	Total		62	11	3	0	2	1	67	12
Crewe Alexandra	1980–81	Fourth Division	3	0	0	0	1	0	4	0
Stockport County	1980–81	Fourth Division	7	3	1	0	0	0	8	3
Career total			273	64	22	5	13	2	308	71
