= Roger Denton =

English footballer (born 1953)

Personal information
- Full name: Roger William Denton
- Date of birth: 6 January 1953 (age 73)
- Place of birth: Stretford, England
- Position: Full back

Youth career
- Manchester United
- Bolton Wanderers

Senior career*
Years	Team	Apps	(Gls)
1971–1972	Bolton Wanderers	4	(0)
1972–1974	Bradford City	30	(0)
1974	→ Rochdale (loan)	2	(0)
Total		36	(0)
- * Club domestic league appearances and goals

Roger William Denton (born 6 January 1953) is an English former professional footballer who played as a full back.

== Career ==
Born in Stretford, Denton played for Manchester United, Bolton Wanderers, Bradford City and Rochdale.

For Bolton Wanderers he made 4 appearances in the Football League.

For Bradford City he made 30 appearances in the Football League; he also made three appearances in the FA Cup.

For Rochdale he made two appearances in the Football League.

== Sources ==
- Frost, Terry (1988). Bradford City A Complete Record 1903-1988. Breedon Books Sport. ISBN 0-907969-38-0.
