= Dick Mulvaney =

English footballer

Richard Mulvaney
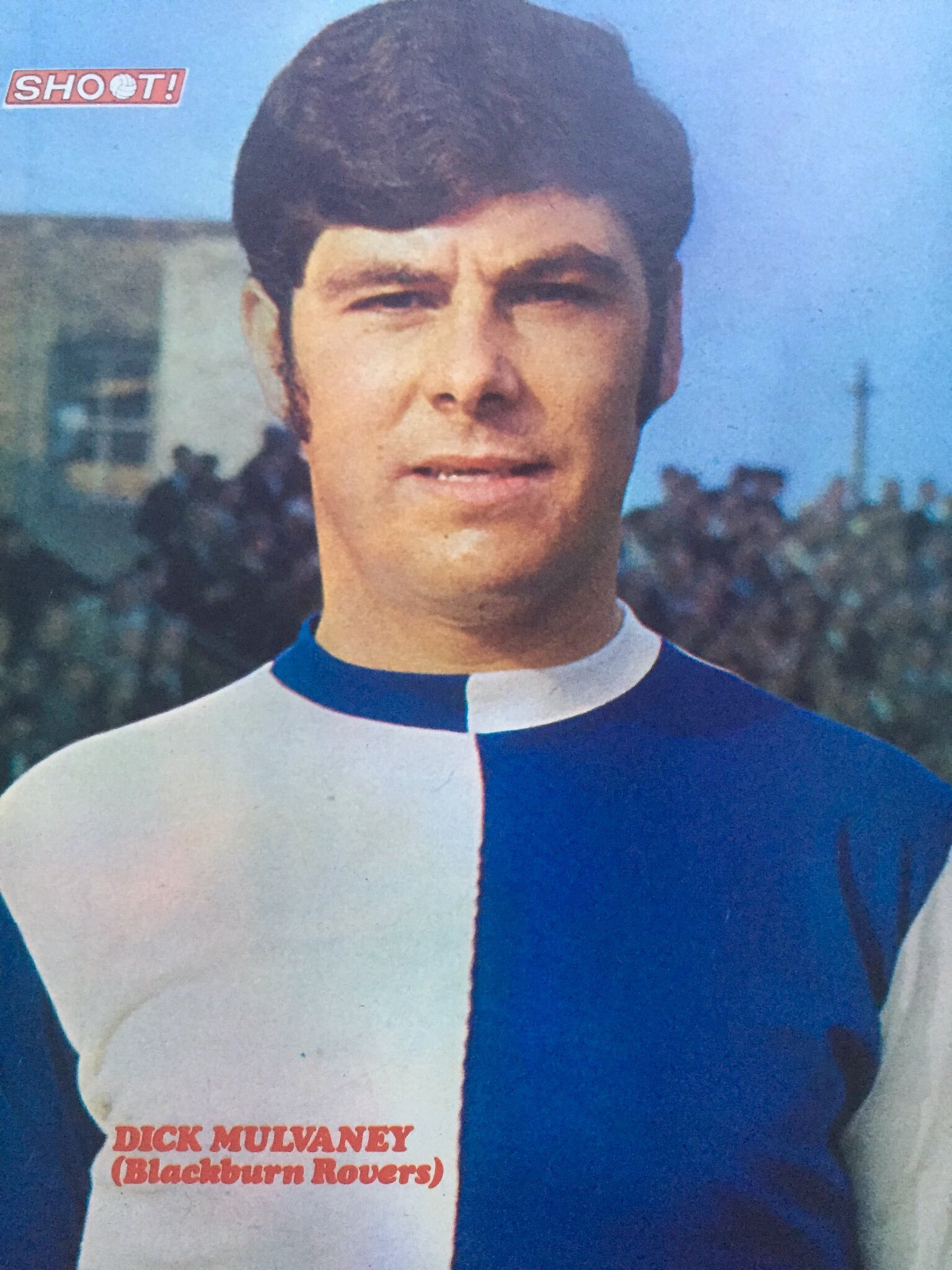

Personal information
- Date of birth: 5 August 1942 (age 84)
- Place of birth: Silksworth, Sunderland, England
- Position: Central defender

Youth career
- 1958–1962: Silksworth Colliery
- 1962–1963: Billingham Synthonia
- 1963–1964: Murton CW

Senior career*
Years	Team	Apps	(Gls)
1964–1971	Blackburn Rovers	145	(4)
1971–1974	Oldham Athletic	92	(2)
1974–1977	Rochdale	73	(4)
1976–1977	Gateshead	20	(1)
Total		330	(11)
- * Club domestic league appearances and goals

Richard Mulvaney (born 5 August 1942) is an English former Professional footballer who played for Blackburn Rovers, Oldham Athletic and Rochdale A.F.C.

== Club career ==
Mulvaney attended St Leonards RC School in Silksworth Sunderland. Playing for Durham County at school level. In 1964, A Blackburn Rovers scout noticed Dick's growing reputation while playing for Murton Colliery in the Wearside League, and took Dick to Ewood Park to be understudy for Mike England. When Mike left for Tottenham Hotspur F.C., Dick became a first team regular, making a total of 145 appearances over a 7-year spell at Rovers. He notably won Blackburn's 1st ever Central League Championship twice. Jimmy Frizzell brought Mulvaney to Oldham Athletic in 1971, where he captained the team to the Third Division Championship in 1974. At the time, it was the 1st league title in the clubs history. At 32 years Old, Mulvaney transferred to Rochdale A.F.C who had looked to add experienced players to their 4th Division campaign. Stan Horne also arrived around that time. In 1976, Dick returned home to Sunderland and continued playing football for non league Gateshead F.C., North Shields & Chester Le Street Town, where he teamed up with Malcolm Moore (footballer) & Jim McNab managing the Wearside League Club.

== Honours ==
Blackburn Rovers

- Central League (England): 1st Division Champions 1964–65 & 1966–67

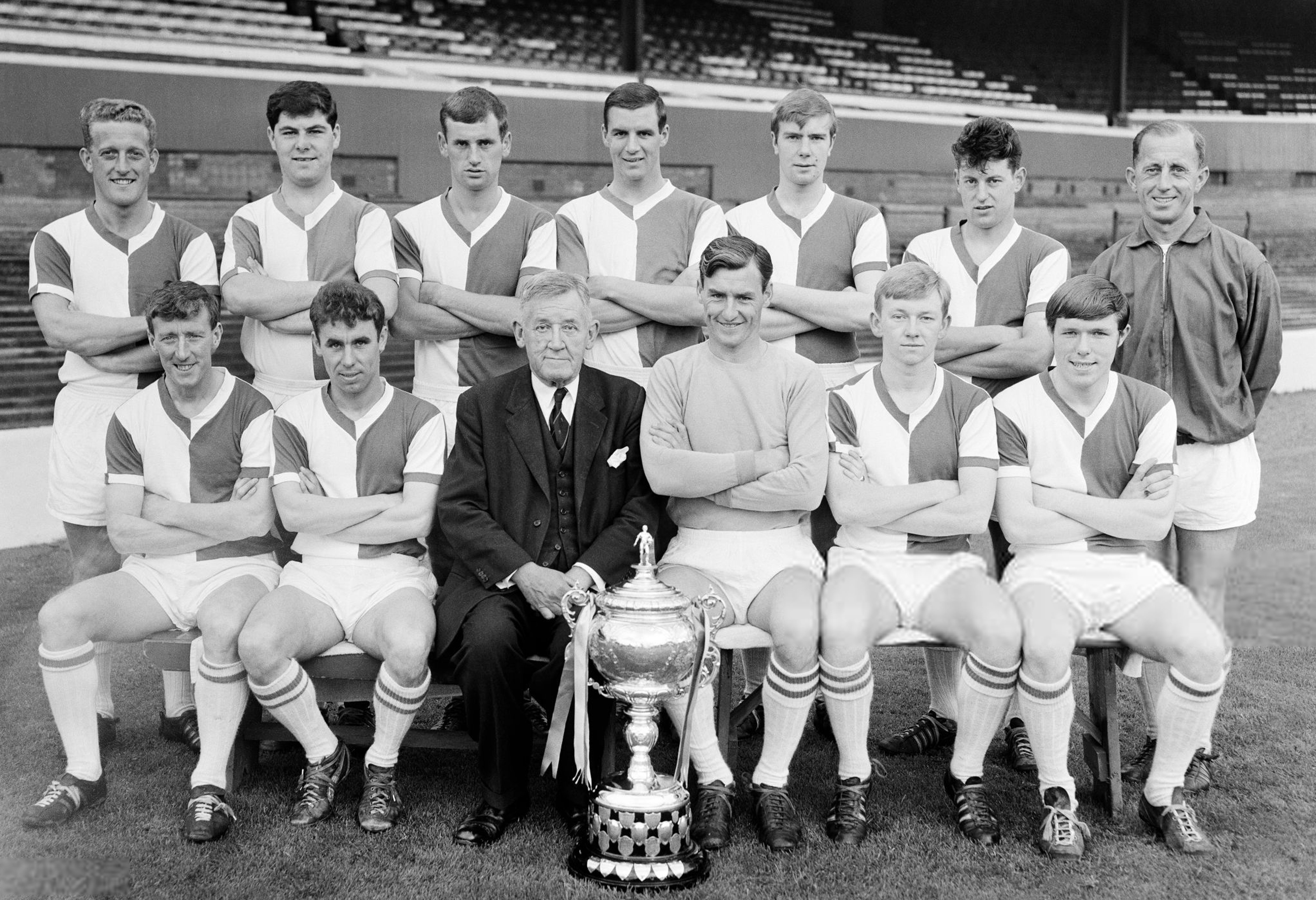

Oldham Athletic

- English Football League: 3rd Division Champions 1973–74

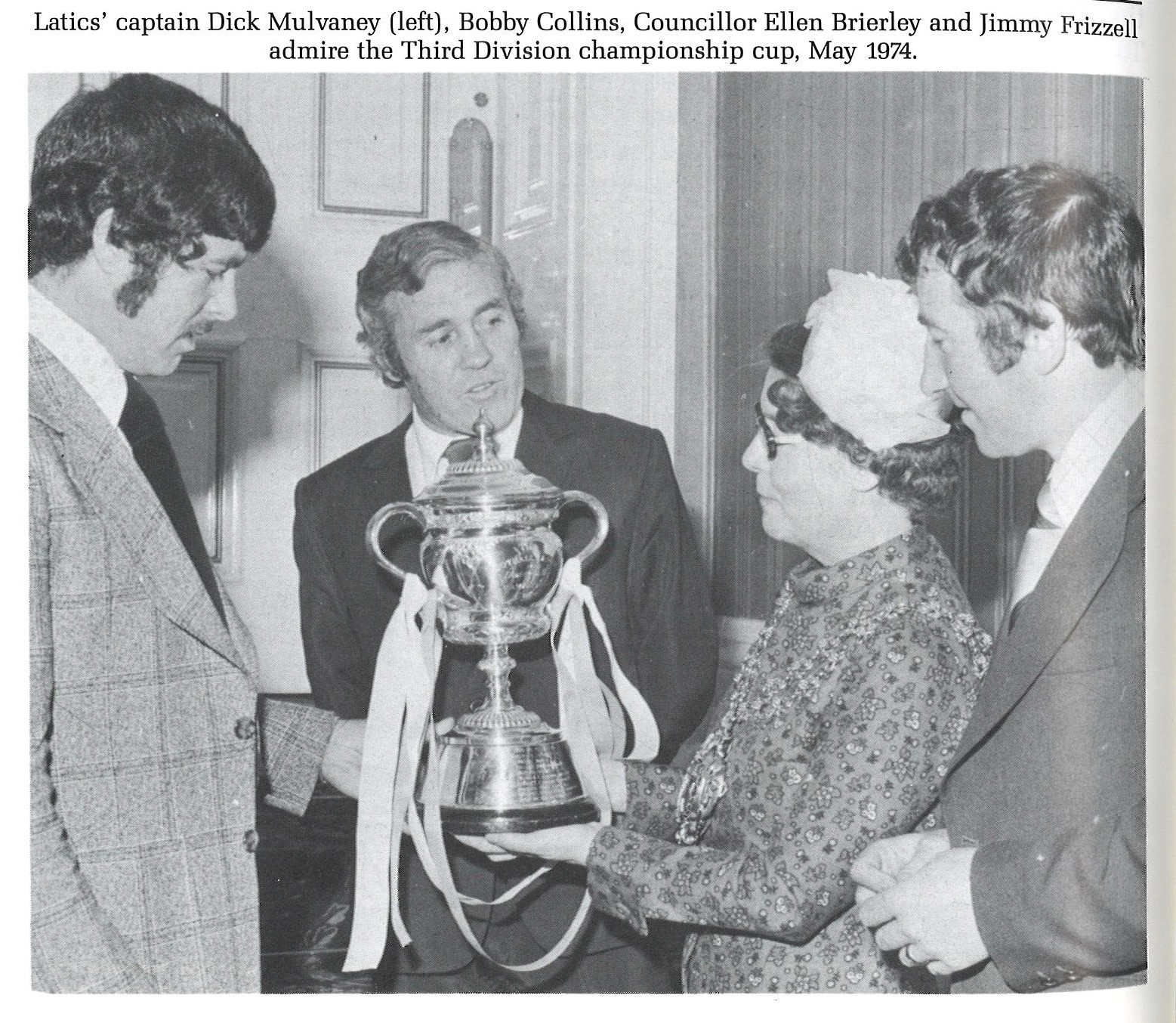

== Personal life ==
Richard was a timed served Corker & Burner at Picklegills Shipyard in Sunderland until becoming a professional footballer at the age of 21. He married Jane Atkinson Cooper in July 1965, and had four children.
