= Rick Green (footballer) =

English former professional footballer who played as a forward

Personal information
- Full name: Richard Green
- Date of birth: 23 November 1952 (age 73)
- Place of birth: Scunthorpe, England
- Position: Forward

Senior career*
| Years | Team | Apps | (Gls) |
- Appleby Frodingham
- Lincoln City
| 1975–1977 | Scunthorpe United | 66 | (19) |
| 1977–1978 | Chesterfield | 48 | (13) |
| 1978–1979 | Notts County | 9 | (0) |
| 1979–1981 | Scunthorpe United | 71 | (19) |
- Brigg Town
- Barton Town
| Total | | 194+ | (51+) |
- * Club domestic league appearances and goals

Richard Green (born 23 November 1952) is an English former professional footballer who played as a forward.

== Career ==
Born in Scunthorpe, Green played for Appleby Frodingham, Lincoln City, Scunthorpe United, Chesterfield, Notts County, Brigg Town and Barton Town.

Green grew up as a Scunthorpe United fan, and began playing for the Appleby Frodingham works team after leaving school. He trialled at Lincoln City and signed for them, but suffered a knee injury which kept him out for 13 weeks. He then signed for Scunthorpe United following a trialHe transferred to Chesterfield for £23,000, and then to Notts County for £40,000, before returning to Scunthorpe for £25,000. He retired from professional football in 1981 due to a back injury, playing in non-league football for Brigg Town and Barton Town.

Green also played cricket and golf.
