= Lee Brogden =

English footballer

Personal information
- Full name: Lee Anthony Brogden
- Date of birth: 18 October 1949 (age 77)
- Place of birth: Leeds, England
- Position: Winger

Youth career
- Leeds Ashley Road

Senior career*
Years	Team	Apps	(Gls)
1967-72	Rotherham United	85	(17)
1972-74	Rochdale	57	(7)
1974	Denver Dynamos	18	(2)
- * Club domestic league appearances and goals

Lee Brogden (born 18 October 1949) is an English former footballer who played as a winger.
