= Billy Boslem =

English footballer

Personal information
- Full name: William Boslem
- Date of birth: 11 January 1958 (age 68)
- Place of birth: Middleton, Greater Manchester, England
- Position: Defender

Senior career*
Years	Team	Apps	(Gls)
1975-78	Rochdale	45	(1)
1976	Mossley (loan)		
- Buxton
- * Club domestic league appearances and goals

Billy Boslem (born 11 January 1958) is an English former footballer who played as a defender.
