= Adrian Santrac =

Australian soccer player (born 1958)

Adrian Santrac (born 29 June 1958) is an Australian soccer coach and former player for Adelaide City and West Adelaide in the National Soccer League.

== Playing career ==
Santrac was born in Adelaide, South Australia, on 29 June 1958.

A midfielder, Santrac played 170 games in the National Soccer League. He played for West Adelaide SC and Adelaide City FC.

== Coaching career ==
When Santrac retired from playing, he was assistant coach of West Adelaide Sharks in the men's National Soccer League for four years, after which he became head coach of the West Adelaide Sharks for two years.

He was the assistant coach of the Australia U23 national team from 1998 and into the Sydney 2000 Olympic Games. He was named coach of the Australia women's national team in November 2001, taking part in the 2003 Women's World Cup and 2004 Athens Olympic Games. In December 2004, he was replaced as the Australian women's national football coach by Tom Sermanni.

He was also head coach of the Australian women's national under-19 team (Young Matildas) in November 2004, which competed in the U-19 Women's World Championship in Thailand. The Young Matildas were sent home after losing their quarterfinal 0–2 against United States.
