= John Peachey (footballer) =

English footballer

Personal information
- Date of birth: 21 July 1952 (age 74)
- Place of birth: Cambridge, England
- Position: Striker

Senior career*
| Years | Team | Apps | (Gls) |
- Hillingdon Borough
| 1973–1974 | York City | 8 | (3) |
| 1974–1978 | Barnsley | 127 | (31) |
| 1976 | → Darlington (loan) | 6 | (3) |
| 1978–1980 | Darlington | 20 | (6) |
| 1980–1981 | Plymouth Argyle | 3 | (0) |
- Barnstaple Town
| Total | | 164 | (43) |
- * Club domestic league appearances and goals

John Peachey (born 21 July 1952) is an English former professional footballer who played as a striker.

== Career ==
Born in Cambridge, Peachey made 164 appearances in the Football League for York City, Barnsley, Darlington and Plymouth Argyle.

He also played non-league football for Hillingdon Borough and Barnstaple Town.
