= Phil Mullington =

English footballer

Philip Mullington
Personal information
- Full name: Philip Tom Mullington
- Date of birth: 25 September 1956 (age 70)
- Place of birth: Oldham, England
- Position: Midfielder

Youth career
- Oldham Athletic

Senior career*
Years	Team	Apps	(Gls)
1972–1975	Oldham Athletic	0	(0)
1975–1977	Rochdale	66	(6)
1977	Northwich Victoria		
1977	Mossley		
1978	Crewe Alexandra	1	(0)
1978–????	Rochdale	9	(0)
- Caroline Hill
1983–1984	Sligo Rovers	5	(2)
- * Club domestic league appearances and goals

Philip Mullington (born 25 September 1956) is an English former footballer who played as a midfielder.

== Career ==
Having begun his career at Oldham Athletic, Mullington signed for Rochdale in December 1975 and went on to play 73 times for the club in all competitions scoring 13 goals. His best remembered goal for the club was probably the one scored on 3 January 1976 which earned Dale an FA Cup Third Round replay at home to then First Division Norwich City after a 1-1 draw at Carrow Road.

Released at the end of the 1976/77 season, he was signed by Dick Bate for Mossley from Northwich Victoria in October 1977. Spells at Crewe Alexandra before a return to Rochdale in August 1978. Mullington later played in Hong Kong and Ireland.

According to the Football League Paper, he "had a spell working as a showbiz agent for singer Wayne Fontana". Mullington, who now has an impressive property portfolio, spends his time between his home in Essex and his overseas property in Mallorca.
