= Leo Skeete =

English footballer

Personal information
- Full name: Leopold Anthony Skeete
- Date of birth: 3 August 1949 (age 77)
- Place of birth: Liverpool, England
- Position: Forward

Senior career*
Years	Team	Apps	(Gls)
- Burscough
- Ellesmere Port Town
1973–1975	Rochdale	40	(14)
1975–1982	Mossley		
1982–1983	Runcorn		
1983–1984	Altrincham		

Managerial career
- 1978: Mossley
- * Club domestic league appearances and goals

Leopold Anthony Skeete (born 3 August 1949) is an English former professional footballer who played as a forward.

Born in Liverpool, Skeete played non-League football for Burscough and Ellesmere Port Town before signing for Rochdale in April 1973. He played 40 Football League games for Rochdale, scoring 14 goals, before returning to non-League football with Mossley in 1975, serving as caretaker manager in January 1978. He signed for Runcorn in 1982 for £3,500, and then Altrincham in 1983, before retiring in 1984.
