= George Townsend (footballer) =

English footballer

Personal information
- Full name: George Ernest Townsend
- Date of birth: 29 July 1957 (age 69)
- Place of birth: Ashton-under-Lyne, England
- Position: Defender

Youth career
- Rochdale

Senior career*
Years	Team	Apps	(Gls)
1974–1976	Rochdale	32	(0)
Total		32	(0)
- * Club domestic league appearances and goals

George Townsend (born 29 July 1957) is an English former footballer who played as a defender.

His son Ryan Townsend was also a professional football player.
