= Alan Beer =

Welsh footballer (born 1950)

Personal information
- Date of birth: 11 March 1950 (age 76)
- Place of birth: Swansea, Wales
- Position: Forward

Senior career*
| Years | Team | Apps | (Gls) |
| 19??–1970 | West End | ? | |
| 1970–1972 | Swansea City | 15 | (3) |
| 1972–1974 | Weymouth | ? | |
| 1974–1978 | Exeter City | 114 | (52) |
- * Club domestic league appearances and goals

Alan Beer (born 11 March 1950) is a Welsh-born former footballer who played as a forward in the Football League during the 1970s, most notably with Exeter City.

== Football career ==
He started his career with home-town's West End F.C., before progressing to play for Swansea's senior team Swansea City. After 15 league appearances he moved into non-league football with Weymouth F.C. but returned to the Football League with Exeter City in 1974/75.

He made over 100 league appearances for Exeter, and was part of the team that were promoted from Football League Division Four in 1976–77, including scoring two goals in an amazing 4–3 win at Barnsley, in which Exeter had trailed 3–0 at half time.

== Later life and legacy ==
Following his retirement from football, he worked in a car dealership.

He was inducted into the Weymouth F.C. Hall of Fame on 21 February 2025.
