= Peter Graham (footballer) =

English footballer

Personal information
- Full name: Peter Graham
- Date of birth: 19 April 1947 (age 79)
- Place of birth: Worsbrough, England
- Height: 5 ft 10 in (1.78 m)
- Position: Forward

Senior career*
Years	Team	Apps	(Gls)
–	Worsbrough Bridge Athletic		
1966–1970	Barnsley	19	(1)
1970	→ Halifax Town (loan)	6	(0)
1970–1973	Darlington	119	(43)
1973–1978	Lincoln City	158	(47)
1978–1980	Cambridge United	38	(0)

Managerial career
- –: Newmarket Town
- * Club domestic league appearances and goals

Peter Graham (born 19 April 1947) is an English former professional footballer who scored 91 goals from 340 games in the English Football League playing as a forward for Barnsley, Halifax Town, Darlington, Lincoln City and Cambridge United.

== Career ==
Graham was born in Worsbrough Common, Barnsley. He was an apprentice plumber playing part-time football for Worsbrough Bridge Athletic before signing a professional contract with Barnsley F.C. He spent four years at Barnsley, playing only infrequently, and after a month on loan to Halifax Town he joined Darlington. After three seasons, during which he scored 43 goals from 116 League appearances, Graham signed for Lincoln City for a fee of £12,500 in September 1973. He scored only twice in his first season, but 13 goals the next season placed him second behind Sam Ellis in the club's scoring charts. He began the 1975–76 season with 11 goals from 13 starts, but a knee injury meant he missed the second half of that season as Lincoln went on to win the Fourth Division title. In his last season with the club, he was joint top scorer alongside Mick Harford, with only nine goals. He finished his playing career with Cambridge United, where he was assistant manager, and later managed Newmarket Town.
