= Tony Geidmintis =

English footballer

Personal information
- Full name: Anthony Joseph Geidmintis
- Date of birth: 30 July 1949
- Place of birth: Stepney, England
- Date of death: 17 April 1993 (aged 43)
- Place of death: Halifax, West Yorkshire, England
- Height: 6 ft 0 in (1.83 m)
- Position: Defender

Youth career
- Workington

Senior career*
Years	Team	Apps	(Gls)
1965–1976	Workington	328	(37)
1976–1978	Watford	49	(0)
1978–1979	Northampton Town	63	(1)
1979–1980	Halifax Town	12	(0)
- Workington
- Cheltenham Town
Total		452+	(38+)
- * Club domestic league appearances and goals

Anthony Joseph Geidmintis (30 July 1949 – 17 April 1993) was an English professional footballer who played as a defender, making over 450 appearances in the Football League.

== Career ==
Born in Stepney, Geidmintis made his Football League debut for Workington on 3 April 1965, aged just 15 years 247 days. He also played in the Football League for Watford, Northampton Town and Halifax Town, before returning in 1980 to a Workington side which had dropped into non-league football. He also played for Cheltenham Town. He retired in the 1980–81 season, aged 31, due to a heart condition that contributed to his death 12 years later.

== Personal life ==
He was of Lithuanian descent.
