= Dave Bruton (footballer) =

English footballer

Personal information
- Date of birth: 31 October 1952 (age 74)
- Place of birth: Dursley, England
- Position: Defender

Youth career
- Bristol City

Senior career*
| Years | Team | Apps | (Gls) |
| 1971–1973 | Bristol City | 17 | (0) |
| 1973–1978 | Swansea Town | 193 | (19) |
| 1976–1977 | → Newport County (loan) | 6 | (1) |
| 1978–1981 | Newport County | 82 | (9) |
| – | Gloucester City | | |
- * Club domestic league appearances and goals

David Bruton (born 31 October 1952) is an English former professional footballer, born in Dursley, Gloucestershire, who played as a central defender in the Football League for Bristol City, Swansea Town and Newport County.

Bruton turned professional with Bristol City in 1971, and moved to Swansea Town in 1973. In his first season, he was Swansea's Player of the Year. He was loaned to Newport County in the 1976–77 season, playing six matches and scoring once. In the 1977–78 season he helped Swansea gain promotion to the Third Division, then in October 1978 he signed permanently for Newport County. He was part of the squad that won promotion to the Third Division and won the Welsh Cup in 1978–79, and in the subsequent season reached the quarter-final of the 1981 European Cup Winners Cup. In total Bruton made 88 league appearances for Newport and scored 10 goals. In 1981, he moved to Gloucester City.

After football, he went on to work for a finance company.

His brother Mike was also a player with Newport County. A forward, he made nine Football League appearances for Newport in the 1979–80 season, scoring once, before returning to Gloucester City.
