= Dave Helliwell =

English footballer

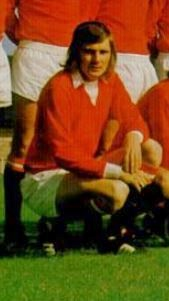
- David in the 1970s

Personal information
- Full name: David Helliwell
- Date of birth: 28 March 1948
- Place of birth: Blackburn, England
- Date of death: 22 March 2003 (aged 54)
- Place of death: Blackburn, England
- Position: Winger

Youth career
- 19??–1966: Blackburn Rovers

Senior career*
Years	Team	Apps	(Gls)
1966–1969	Blackburn Rovers	15	(1)
1969–1970	Lincoln City	13	(1)
1970–1976	Workington	189	(20)
1976–1977	Rochdale	31	(3)
1977-1978	Morecambe		
- * Club domestic league appearances and goals

David Helliwell (28 March 1948 – 22 March 2003) was an English professional footballer who made 257 appearances with 25 goals scored in the Football League, playing as a winger for Blackburn Rovers, Lincoln City, Workington and Rochdale. He also played non-league football for Morecambe.

Helliwell was born in 1948 in Blackburn, Lancashire, and died there in 2003 at the age of 54.

== Career ==
In 1969, at the age of 21, he was signed for Lincoln City by manager Ron Gray for a fee of £4,000. In the previous season, when Jim Smith moved to Boston United as player-manager, Helliwell got an other new signing midfield partner Billy Taylor from Nottingham Forest.

In the first game of the 1969/70 season against Colchester United at Sincil Bank, Helliwell made his City debut alongside Taylor.

During the summer of 1970, Helliwell was released on a free transfer joining Workington, played around 200 games for the Cumbrian side, scoring 21 goals, and was featured against City over the next five seasons. After getting a free transfer prior to Workington's last season in the League, he then spent a year with Rochdale before joining Morecambe side for Northern Premier League in 1977.
