= Gary Hulmes =

English footballer

Personal information
- Full name: Gary Anthony Hulmes
- Date of birth: 28 February 1957 (age 69)
- Place of birth: Manchester, England
- Position: Forward

Youth career
- Manchester United
- Manchester City

Senior career*
Years	Team	Apps	(Gls)
1974–1976	Rochdale	9	(1)
1976–1980	Sligo Rovers	96	(49)
1980–1981	Limerick		(56)
1981	Altrincham		
1981–1985	Limerick		
1986–1987	Sligo Rovers	6	(1)
- * Club domestic league appearances and goals

Gary Hulmes (born 28 February 1958) is an English former footballer who played as a forward.

He began his professional football career with Rochdale, where he played for two seasons before being released by the club in 1976.

He was then signed for Sligo Rovers by manager Billy Sinclair and went on to enjoy a successful career in Ireland with Rovers and Limerick.
