= Stan Horne =

English footballer

Personal information
- Full name: Stanley Frederick Horne
- Date of birth: 17 December 1944 (age 81)
- Place of birth: Clanfield, England
- Position: Midfielder

Youth career
- 1960–1961: Swindon Town
- 1961–1963: Aston Villa

Senior career*
| Years | Team | Apps | (Gls) |
| 1963–1965 | Aston Villa | 6 | (0) |
| 1965–1968 | Manchester City | 50 | (0) |
| 1968–1973 | Fulham | 79 | (0) |
| 1973–1974 | Chester | 18 | (0) |
| 1974 | Denver Dynamos | 20 | (0) |
| 1974–1975 | Rochdale | 48 | (5) |
| Total | | 221 | (5) |
- * Club domestic league appearances and goals

Stan Horne (born 17 December 1944) is an English former professional footballer who played as a midfielder. Horne was the first black player in the history of two of his teams - Manchester City and Fulham and the second to play for Aston Villa. He also played for Chester, Denver Dynamos and Rochdale, making a total of 201 appearances in the Football League. He was forced to retire from professional football due to high blood pressure.

== Honours ==
Manchester City

- First Division: 1967–68
