= Micky Brennan =

English footballer

Mick Brennan
Personal information
- Date of birth: 17 May 1952 (age 74)
- Place of birth: Salford, England
- Positions: Forward; midfielder

Senior career*
Years	Team	Apps	(Gls)
1970–1973	Manchester City	4	(0)
1971–1972	→ Stockport County (loan)	18	(3)
1973–1975	Rochdale	37	(4)
1975	→ Mossley (loan)		
1975–1977	Macclesfield Town	101	(17)
1977–1979	Northwich Victoria		
1979–1980	Oswestry Town		
1980–81	Witton Albion		
1981	Macclesfield Town	20	(0)
- * Club domestic league appearances and goals

Mick Brennan (born 17 May 1952, in Salford) is an English retired professional footballer. He played as a forward or a midfielder.

In 1977, Micky Brennan is listed with the Cleveland State University men's soccer team. He is then listed as having played for the Cleveland Cobras of the American Soccer League in 1978.
