= Malcolm Moore (footballer) =

English footballer (born 1948)

Personal information
- Date of birth: 18 December 1948 (age 77)
- Place of birth: Silksworth, England
- Position: Centre forward

Senior career*
Years	Team	Apps	(Gls)
1967–1970	Sunderland	12	(3)
1970	→ Crewe Alexandra (loan)	8	(0)
1970–1973	Tranmere Rovers	91	(21)
1973–1976	Hartlepool United	129	(34)
1976–1977	Workington	22	(2)
- Gateshead
Total		262	(60)
- * Club domestic league appearances and goals

Malcolm Moore (born 18 December 1948) is an English former footballer who played as a centre forward for Sunderland, Crewe Alexandra, Tranmere Rovers, Hartlepool United and Workington.
