= Tony Whelan =

English footballer (born 1952)

Tony Whelan MBE
Personal information
- Date of birth: 20 November 1952 (age 73)
- Place of birth: Salford, England
- Positions: Forward; midfielder

Team information
- Current team: Manchester United (assistant academy director)

Youth career
- 1968–1969: Manchester United

Senior career*
Years	Team	Apps	(Gls)
1969–1973	Manchester United	0	(0)
1973–1974	Manchester City	6	(0)
1974–1977	Rochdale	124	(20)
1976	Los Angeles Skyhawks	21	(5)
1977–1979	Fort Lauderdale Strikers	85	(5)
1979–1980	Fort Lauderdale Strikers (indoor)	4	(1)
1980–1981	Atlanta Chiefs	60	(3)
1981–1982	Philadelphia Fever (indoor)	41	(2)
1982–1983	Fort Lauderdale Strikers	15	(0)
1983	Fort Lauderdale Strikers (indoor)	4	(2)
1983–?	Witton Albion	?	(?)
- * Club domestic league appearances and goals

Anthony Michael Whelan MBE (/ˈhwiːlən/; born 20 November 1952) is an English former professional footballer who works as assistant academy director of Manchester United. He is responsible for the Under-9 to Under-16 player development programme.

== Playing career ==
=== Early career ===
Whelan was born in Salford, Lancashire, and grew up as a Manchester City fan in Wythenshawe, South Manchester. He attended St Anthonys Sec Modern in Blackley, North Manchester for a short while then after the family moved to Partington, Whelan attended St Paul's Secondary Modern School in Urmston, where he captained his school team, as well as the local schoolboy representative team, Stretford Boys. Whilst playing for Stretford Boys, Whelan was spotted by Manchester United scout Joe Armstrong and invited to sign associated schoolboy forms in 1967.

He signed apprentice professional forms upon leaving school in July 1968 and advanced through the various junior teams featuring in the FA Youth Cup team that reached the semi-finals in both 1969 and 1970. They also won the prestigious FC Blue Stars Youth Tournament in Zurich, Switzerland in May 1969. He signed as a full professional in December 1969 and, in May 1970, aged just 17, he was selected to go on the first team's three-week tour of Bermuda, Canada and the United States, where he played against Eintracht Frankfurt and the Bermuda national football team. The remainder of his tenure with the club was spent on the fringes of the first team, playing for the Reserves, for whom he was the leading scorer in 1971–72.

=== Manchester City and Rochdale ===
In February 1973, Whelan was on the verge of signing for Bolton Wanderers when his mother received a phone call from Manchester City manager Malcolm Allison. He was offered a month-long trial with the club, and within three weeks he had been offered a professional contract and was making his debut against West Ham United, starting up front with Francis Lee on 17 March 1973. However, Whelan only made five more appearances for City over the next 16 months before departing for Rochdale in July 1974. In his first season with Rochdale, Whelan was voted as the club's Player of the Year. In the second season he became, jointly with Clive Charles of Cardiff City, the first black player to receive a PFA divisional award being named by his fellow pros in their all-star team. He scored 20 goals in 130 first team outings for Rochdale.

==== Los Angeles Skyhawks ====
In 1976, coach Ron Newman brought Whelan across the pond to play for the American Soccer League's expansion Los Angeles Skyhawks. Whelan quickly became a fan favourite and earned the nickname "Wheels" for his speed and as a play on his last name. Splitting his time between midfield and forward, Whelan was the third leading scorer on the team as they won the ASL championship.

=== North American Soccer League ===
After a brief stint back in England, Whelan went back to the United States in April 1977 to play for the Fort Lauderdale Strikers in the North American Soccer League from 1977 to 1979, and from 1982 to 1983, during which time they won the Eastern Division title and reached the American Conference final in 1978. During his two spells with the club, he played over a hundred games and had the dual role of Director of Youth Development from 1982 to 1983. He also received the honorary citizenship of Plantation, Florida for services to the youth of the community (1978).

Whelan was also selected for the Fort Lauderdale Sun-Sentinel "All Strikers Team" (1 December 1983) which included George Best, Gerd Müller, Teófilo Cubillas and Brian Kidd. Whelan was transferred to the Atlanta Chiefs for the 1980 and 1981 seasons and helped them win divisional titles, both indoor and outdoor, in 1981. During his time in America, he played in over 170 matches in the NASL.

Whelan was also the recipient of the Most Valuable Player Award (MVP) in two nationally televised games in 1978.

=== Major Indoor Soccer League ===
Following the demise of the Atlanta Chiefs franchise in 1981, Whelan spent the 1981–82 season in the MISL playing for the Philadelphia Fever before they folded at the end of the season.

== Coaching career ==
Upon returning to England in November 1983, Whelan continued to coach young players part-time on Manchester City's Community Football Programme between 1987 and 1990. In September 1990, he was invited by Brian Kidd to join Manchester United's Centre of Excellence as a coach, and joined the full-time staff in September 1998 when the Academy was established. His time as a player included, Whelan has been involved with the club for over 20 years.

Over the years, Whelan has gained several coaching qualifications, as well as a bachelor's degree in humanities from the Open University, and a master's degree in sociology from Manchester Metropolitan University. He also wrote the foreword to Phil Vasili's The First Black Footballer: Arthur Wharton 1865–1930 An Absence of Memory (1998) and is the author of The Birth of the Babes: Manchester United Youth Policy 1950–1957, which explores the impact of youth development and the building of the Busby Babes side at Manchester United.

In March 2008, The Voice included him on a list of the 30 most influential black people in English football in recognition of his work developing elite young players. In October 2008, he received an award at the House of Lords from Kick It Out acknowledging his inclusion in the list.

In 2015, Whelan successfully completed a professional doctorate entitled "Pastoral Care of Premier League Academy Schoolboy Footballers (with particular reference to Manchester United)".

In July 2020, Whelan received the Eamonn Dolan award from the Premier League for his role in the Manchester United academy and his contribution to youth coaching.
