= Paul Brears =

English footballer

Personal information
- Full name: Paul Arthur Brears
- Date of birth: 25 September 1954 (age 72)
- Place of birth: Oldham, England
- Position: Midfielder

Youth career
- Oldham Athletic

Senior career*
Years	Team	Apps	(Gls)
1973-1975	Rochdale	27	(0)
- * Club domestic league appearances and goals

Paul Brears (born 25 September 1954) is an English former footballer who played as a midfielder.
