= Paul Fielding =

English footballer

Personal information
- Full name: Paul Fielding
- Date of birth: 4 December 1955 (age 70)
- Place of birth: Oldham, England
- Position: Midfielder

Senior career*
Years	Team	Apps	(Gls)
1973–1976	Rochdale	72	(5)
1976–1980	Sligo Rovers		
1980–1981	Glenavon		
1981–1985	Sligo Rovers		
1985–1986	Newcastlewest		
1986–1987	Sligo Rovers		
- Canberra City
- * Club domestic league appearances and goals

Paul Fielding (born 4 December 1955) is an English former footballer who played as a midfielder.
