= Eddie Woods (footballer) =

Welsh footballer

Personal information
- Full name: Eddie Woods
- Date of birth: 29 July 1951 (age 75)
- Place of birth: Ton Pentre, Wales
- Position: Forward

Senior career*
Years	Team	Apps	(Gls)
- Ton Pentre
1972–1973	Bristol City	2	(0)
1973–1974	→ Scunthorpe United (loan)	4	(2)
1974–1979	Newport County	151	(54)
- Bridgend
Total		157	(56)
- * Club domestic league appearances and goals

Eddie Woods (born 29 July 1951) is a Welsh former professional footballer. A striker, Woods joined Newport County in 1974 from Bristol City. Woods went on to make 151 appearances for the club, scoring 55 goals. In 1979, he joined Bridgend Town.
