= Gary Cooper (footballer, born 1955) =

English footballer (born 1955)

Gary Smethurst Cooper (born 15 February 1955) is an English former footballer who played as a forward for Rochdale, Southport, Lancaster City and Horwich RMI. He was an apprentice with Bolton Wanderers and signed for Oldham Athletic after his 2 years with the likes of Sam Allardyce at Bolton he went onto Oldham Athletic where he spent 1 season without making a first team appearance.
