= 1965–66 Mansfield Town F.C. season =

Mansfield Town
1965–66 season
- Manager: Tommy Cummings
- Stadium: Field Mill
- Third Division: 19th
- FA Cup: First round
- League Cup: Third round

The 1965–66 season was Mansfield Town's 29th season in the Football League and 5th in the Third Division, they finished in 19th position with 38 points, two above the relegation zone.

== Final league table ==
| Pos | Team | Pld | W | D | L | GF | GA | GAv | Pts | Promotion or relegation |
|---|---|---|---|---|---|---|---|---|---|---|
| 17 | Swansea Town | 46 | 15 | 11 | 20 | 81 | 96 | 0.844 | 41 | Qualification for the European Cup Winners' Cup first round |
| 18 | Bournemouth & Boscombe Athletic | 46 | 13 | 12 | 21 | 38 | 56 | 0.679 | 38 | |
| 19 | Mansfield Town | 46 | 15 | 8 | 23 | 59 | 89 | 0.663 | 38 | |
| 20 | Oldham Athletic | 46 | 12 | 13 | 21 | 55 | 81 | 0.679 | 37 | |
| 21 | Southend United (R) | 46 | 16 | 4 | 26 | 54 | 83 | 0.651 | 36 | Relegation to the Fourth Division |

(R) Relegated

== Results ==
=== Football League Third Division ===
| Match | Date | Opponent | Venue | Result | Attendance | Scorers |
|---|---|---|---|---|---|---|
| 1 | 21 August 1965 | Brighton & Hove Albion | H | 3–1 | 7,647 | Morris, Curry (2) |
| 2 | 25 August 1965 | Scunthorpe United | A | 1–0 | 6,894 | Curry |
| 3 | 28 August 1965 | Queens Park Rangers | A | 2–1 | 6,405 | Middleton, Anderson |
| 4 | 4 September 1965 | Bristol Rovers | H | 2–0 | 9,559 | Curry |
| 5 | 11 September 1965 | Hull City | H | 1–2 | 14,081 | Anderson |
| 6 | 14 September 1965 | Watford | A | 1–2 | 11,521 | Morris |
| 7 | 17 September 1965 | Reading | A | 1–2 | 7,450 | Middleton |
| 8 | 25 September 1965 | Exeter City | H | 0–0 | 7,511 | |
| 9 | 2 October 1965 | Peterborough United | A | 2–3 | 8,213 | Scanlon, Aldread |
| 10 | 4 October 1965 | Watford | H | 2–2 | 8,509 | Scanlon (2) |
| 11 | 9 October 1965 | Oxford United | A | 1–4 | 9,789 | Middleton |
| 12 | 16 October 1965 | Swansea Town | H | 3–0 | 6,767 | Middleton, Scanlon, Lee |
| 13 | 23 October 1965 | Walsall | A | 1–2 | 9,334 | Middleton |
| 14 | 30 October 1965 | Workington | A | 0–1 | 5,679 | |
| 15 | 6 November 1965 | Bournemouth & Boscombe Athletic | A | 2–2 | 4,807 | Curry, Macready |
| 16 | 20 November 1965 | Swindon Town | A | 2–6 | 12,213 | Curry (2) |
| 17 | 11 December 1965 | Brentford | H | 2–0 | 3,617 | Curry, Scanlon |
| 18 | 1 January 1966 | Oxford United | A | 1–4 | 5,194 | Middleton |
| 19 | 8 January 1966 | Southend United | A | 0–1 | 7,155 | |
| 20 | 15 January 1966 | Walsall | H | 0–3 | 4,027 | |
| 21 | 29 January 1966 | Brighton & Hove Albion | A | 4–6 | 13,058 | Macready, Anderson (2), Aldread |
| 22 | 5 February 1966 | Queens Park Rangers | H | 2–1 | 4,166 | Macready, Anderson |
| 23 | 19 February 1966 | Bristol Rovers | A | 0–6 | 7,477 | |
| 24 | 21 February 1966 | Oldham Athletic | H | 1–0 | 5,789 | Middleton |
| 25 | 26 February 1966 | Hull City | A | 0–4 | 28,214 | |
| 26 | 1 March 1966 | Swansea Town | A | 2–1 | 8,887 | Anderson, Mitchinson |
| 27 | 5 March 1966 | Oldham Athletic | A | 1–1 | 10,239 | Anderson |
| 28 | 7 March 1966 | Scunthorpe United | H | 2–2 | 6,678 | Middleton, Curry |
| 29 | 12 March 1966 | Reading | H | 0–2 | 4,721 | |
| 30 | 14 March 1966 | Gillingham | H | 0–0 | 5,251 | |
| 31 | 19 March 1966 | Exeter City | A | 2–2 | 5,055 | Hall, Morris |
| 32 | 21 March 1966 | Shrewsbury Town | H | 0–3 | 5,662 | |
| 33 | 26 March 1966 | Peterborough United | H | 1–7 | 3,551 | Mallinson |
| 34 | 8 April 1966 | York City | A | 1–2 | 3,398 | Curry |
| 35 | 9 April 1966 | Grimsby Town | A | 1–0 | 4,228 | Macready |
| 36 | 11 April 1966 | York City | H | 4–1 | 4,232 | Anderson, Mitchinson (2), Aldread |
| 37 | 16 April 1966 | Swindon Town | H | 1–5 | 3,763 | Gregson |
| 38 | 22 April 1966 | Shrewsbury Town | A | 1–2 | 3,585 | Mitchinson |
| 39 | 25 April 1966 | Millwall | H | 1–1 | 5,709 | Scanlon |
| 40 | 30 April 1966 | Grimsby Town | H | 2–1 | 4,961 | Anderson, Curry |
| 41 | 3 May 1966 | Gillingham | A | 0–2 | 6,127 | |
| 42 | 7 May 1966 | Brentford | A | 3–0 | 7,970 | Mitchinson, Gregson, Curry |
| 43 | 9 May 1966 | Southend United | H | 2–0 | 6,544 | Gregson, Morris |
| 44 | 16 May 1966 | Millwall | A | 0–2 | 15,980 | |
| 45 | 23 May 1966 | Bournemouth & Boscombe Athletic | H | 1–0 | 6,385 | Curry |
| 46 | 27 May 1966 | Workington | A | 0–2 | 2,261 | |

=== FA Cup ===
| Round | Date | Opponent | Venue | Result | Attendance | Scorers |
|---|---|---|---|---|---|---|
| R1 | 13 November 1965 | Oldham Athletic | H | 1–3 | 6,914 | Macready |

=== League Cup ===
| Round | Date | Opponent | Venue | Result | Attendance | Scorers |
|---|---|---|---|---|---|---|
| R2 | 22 September 1965 | Birmingham City | H | 2–1 | 9,354 | Scanlon, Middleton |
| R3 | 13 October 1965 | West Ham United | A | 0–4 | 11,613 | |

== Squad statistics ==
- Squad list sourced from 1965–66 Mansfield Town F.C. season at the English National Football Archive (subscription required)

| Pos. | Name | League | | FA Cup | | League Cup | | Total | |
| Pos. | Name | Apps | Goals | Apps | Goals | Apps | Goals | Apps | Goals |
|---|---|---|---|---|---|---|---|---|---|
| GK | (England) Alan Humphreys | 17 | 0 | 0 | 0 | 0 | 0 | 17 | 0 |
| GK | (Wales) Colin Treharne | 29 | 0 | 1 | 0 | 2 | 0 | 32 | 0 |
| DF | (England) Johnny Gill | 18(1) | 0 | 1 | 0 | 2 | 0 | 21(1) | 0 |
| DF | (England) Wilf Humble | 22 | 0 | 1 | 0 | 2 | 0 | 25 | 0 |
| DF | (England) Mick Jones | 19 | 0 | 0 | 0 | 0 | 0 | 19 | 0 |
| DF | (England) Dick Lee | 3(1) | 1 | 0 | 0 | 0 | 0 | 3(1) | 1 |
| DF | (England) Colin Nelson | 32 | 0 | 1 | 0 | 2 | 0 | 35 | 0 |
| DF | (England) Bill Poynton | 7 | 0 | 1 | 0 | 0 | 0 | 8 | 0 |
| DF | (England) Bill Richardson | 12(1) | 0 | 0 | 0 | 0 | 0 | 12(1) | 0 |
| DF | (England) Colin Toon | 9 | 0 | 0 | 0 | 0 | 0 | 9 | 0 |
| DF | (England) Bill Williams | 28 | 0 | 0 | 0 | 0 | 0 | 28 | 0 |
| MF | (England) Ian Hall | 41 | 1 | 1 | 0 | 2 | 0 | 44 | 1 |
| MF | (England) David Mallinson | 10(1) | 1 | 0 | 0 | 0 | 0 | 10(1) | 1 |
| MF | (England) Tommy Mitchinson | 28 | 5 | 0 | 0 | 0 | 0 | 28 | 5 |
| MF | (England) Peter Morris | 39(1) | 4 | 1 | 0 | 2 | 0 | 42(1) | 4 |
| FW | (England) Paul Aldread | 10(1) | 3 | 0 | 0 | 0 | 0 | 10(1) | 3 |
| FW | (England) Geoff Anderson | 29 | 9 | 0 | 0 | 0 | 0 | 29 | 9 |
| FW | (Scotland) Neil Burns | 5(2) | 0 | 0 | 0 | 0 | 0 | 5(2) | 0 |
| FW | (England) Albert Cheesebrough | 20 | 0 | 1 | 0 | 2 | 0 | 23 | 0 |
| FW | (England) Bill Curry | 36 | 14 | 1 | 0 | 1 | 0 | 38 | 14 |
| FW | (Wales) Doug Curtin | 3 | 0 | 0 | 0 | 0 | 0 | 3 | 0 |
| FW | (England) John Gregson | 30 | 3 | 0 | 0 | 2 | 0 | 32 | 3 |
| FW | (England) Brian Macready | 18(1) | 4 | 1 | 1 | 1 | 0 | 20(1) | 5 |
| FW | (England) Harry Middleton | 21(1) | 8 | 1 | 0 | 2 | 1 | 24(1) | 9 |
| FW | (England) Albert Scanlon | 20 | 6 | 0 | 0 | 2 | 1 | 22 | 7 |
