= 1964–65 Mansfield Town F.C. season =

Mansfield Town
1964–65 season
- Manager: Tommy Cummings
- Stadium: Field Mill
- Third Division: 3rd
- FA Cup: Second round
- League Cup: Third round

The 1964–65 season was Mansfield Town's 28th season in the Football League and 4th in the Third Division, they finished in 3rd position with 59 points, missing out on promotion on goal average to Bristol City.

== Final league table ==
Pos	Team	Pld	W	D	L	GF	GA	GAv	Pts	Promotion or relegation
1	Carlisle United (C, P)	46	25	10	11	76	53	1.434	60	Promotion to the Second Division
2	Bristol City (P)	46	24	11	11	92	55	1.673	59	Promotion to the Second Division
3	Mansfield Town	46	24	11	11	95	61	1.557	59	
4	Hull City	46	23	12	11	91	57	1.596	58	
5	Brentford	46	24	9	13	83	55	1.509	57	

(C) Champions; (P) Promoted

== Results ==
=== Football League Third Division ===
Match	Date	Opponent	Venue	Result	Attendance	Scorers
1	22 August 1964	Bristol Rovers	A	1–4	10,701	Morris
2	24 August 1964	Brentford	H	4–1	11,426	Chapman, Anderson, Scanlon, Wagstaff
3	29 August 1964	Oldham Athletic	H	4–1	9,346	Morris, Wagstaff, Hollett, Macready
4	31 August 1964	Brentford	A	0–1	10,592	
5	5 September 1964	Exeter City	A	3–2	8,357	B Hall, Cooper (2)
6	7 September 1964	Colchester United	H	0–1	11,574	
7	12 September 1964	Bournemouth & Boscombe Athletic	H	0–0	7,621	
8	14 September 1964	Colchester United	A	1–0	3,544	Scanlon
9	19 September 1964	Peterborough United	A	5–4	10,526	Scanlon, Chapman (2), Macready, Wagstaff
10	26 September 1964	Grimsby Town	H	2–2	10,620	Chapman, Macready
11	28 September 1964	Port Vale	H	2–2	10,709	Scanlon, Graham
12	3 October 1964	Scunthorpe United	H	3–2	7,911	Chapman (2), Wagstaff
13	5 October 1964	Port Vale	A	2–2	4,247	B Hall, Cooper
14	10 October 1964	Watford	A	1–3	8,044	Wagstaff
15	12 October 1964	Luton Town	H	2–0	8,083	Wagstaff, Bramwell (o.g.)
16	17 October 1964	Workington	H	3–5	7,227	Cooper, Scanlon, I Hall
17	21 October 1964	Luton Town	A	1–1	2,874	Anderson
18	24 October 1964	Hull City	A	1–1	8,482	Hollett
19	26 October 1964	Barnsley	H	4–3	8,245	Anderson, Wagstaff, Graham, Swallow (o.g.)
20	31 October 1964	Gillingham	H	3–1	7,073	I Hall, Wagstaff, Graham
21	3 November 1964	Shrewsbury Town	A	1–1	5,463	Wagstaff
22	7 November 1964	Bristol City	A	1–1	9,653	Scanlon
23	28 November 1964	Reading	H	2–1	6,480	Middleton, Kerr (o.g.)
24	12 December 1964	Bristol Rovers	H	3–0	4,783	Gregson, Chapman, Morris
25	19 December 1964	Oldham Athletic	A	1–2	6,310	Chapman
26	26 December 1964	Walsall	A	1–2	6,898	Middleton
27	28 December 1964	Walsall	H	2–0	5,201	Middleton, Chapman
28	2 January 1965	Exeter City	H	2–1	6,678	Middleton (2)
29	16 January 1965	Bournemouth & Boscombe Athletic	A	0–2	5,284	
30	30 January 1965	Southend United	A	4–1	5,360	Scanlon, Tyrer, I Hall, Middleton
31	6 February 1965	Grimsby Town	A	1–1	6,564	Macready
32	12 February 1965	Scunthorpe United	A	1–0	6,115	Curry
33	20 February 1965	Watford	H	3–0	6,180	Middleton, I Hall, Curry
34	26 February 1965	Workington	A	5–1	4,414	Curry (3), Middleton (2)
35	13 March 1965	Gillingham	A	0–0	11,849	
36	15 March 1965	Queens Park Rangers	H	8–1	9,168	Curry (3), Middleton (3), Morris, Gregson
37	20 March 1965	Bristol City	H	3–0	9,434	Middleton (2), Curry
38	26 March 1965	Queens Park Rangers	A	0–2	5,400	
39	29 March 1965	Peterborough United	H	0–0	15,346	
40	3 April 1965	Shrewsbury Town	H	1–0	8,984	Morris
41	5 April 1965	Southend United	H	6–1	11,850	Curry (4), Morris, Anderson
42	10 April 1965	Reading	A	1–2	5,406	Curry
43	17 April 1965	Hull City	H	2–1	19,500	Middleton (2)
44	19 April 1965	Carlisle United	H	2–0	13,832	Curry, Macready
45	20 April 1965	Carlisle United	A	0–3	18,764	
46	24 April 1965	Barnsley	A	3–2	6,860	Macready (2), Morris

=== FA Cup ===
Round	Date	Opponent	Venue	Result	Attendance	Scorers
R1	14 November 1964	Oxford United	A	1–0	9,765	I Hall
R2	5 December 1964	Newport County	A	0–3	5,304	

=== League Cup ===
Round	Date	Opponent	Venue	Result	Attendance	Scorers
R2	23 September 1964	Manchester City	A	5–3	8,789	Chapman 23', 47', Wagstaff 24', Tyrer 44', Macready 53'
R3	14 October 1964	Coventry City	A	2–3	12,387	Wagstaff, Scanlon

== Squad statistics ==
- Squad list sourced from 1964–65 Mansfield Town F.C. season at the English National Football Archive (subscription required)

Pos.	Name	League		FA Cup		League Cup		Total	
Pos.	Name	Apps	Goals	Apps	Goals	Apps	Goals	Apps	Goals
GK	(England) Alan Humphreys	8	0	0	0	0	0	8	0
GK	(Wales) Colin Treharne	38	0	2	0	2	0	42	0
DF	(England) Johnny Gill	46	0	2	0	2	0	50	0
DF	(England) Brian Hall	10	2	0	0	2	0	12	2
DF	(England) Wilf Humble	17	0	0	0	0	0	17	0
DF	(England) Colin Nelson	6	0	0	0	0	0	6	0
DF	(England) Bill Poynton	13	0	0	0	2	0	15	0
DF	(England) Colin Toon	17	0	2	0	0	0	19	0
MF	(England) Gerry Graham	18	3	2	0	1	0	21	3
MF	(England) Ian Hall	34	4	2	1	1	0	37	5
MF	(England) Mick Jones	35	0	2	0	1	0	38	0
MF	(England) Peter Morris	46	7	2	0	2	0	50	7
MF	(England) Alan Tyrer	18	1	0	0	2	1	20	2
FW	(England) Geoff Anderson	14	4	1	0	0	0	15	4
FW	(England) Roy Chapman	19	9	2	0	1	2	22	11
FW	(England) Jim Cooper	7	4	1	0	1	0	9	4
FW	(England) Bill Curry	16	15	0	0	0	0	16	15
FW	(England) Charlie Govan	1	0	0	0	1	0	2	0
FW	(England) John Gregson	24	2	1	0	0	0	25	2
FW	(England) Ivan Hollett	5	2	0	0	0	0	5	2
FW	(England) Brian Macready	31	7	0	0	1	1	32	8
FW	(England) Harry Middleton	24	16	1	0	0	0	25	16
FW	(England) Albert Scanlon	37	7	2	0	1	1	40	8
FW	(England) Ken Wagstaff	22	9	0	0	2	2	24	11
–	Own goals	–	3	–	0	–	0	–	3
