= Peter Kerr =

Peter Kerr may refer to:

- Peter Kerr, 12th Marquess of Lothian (1922–2004), Scottish peer, politician and landowner
- Peter Kerr (architect) (1820–1912), Australian architect
- Peter Kerr (author) (born 1940), Scottish author
- Peter Kerr (footballer, born 1891) (1891–1969), Scottish international footballer
- Peter Kerr (footballer, born 1943), Scottish footballer
- Peter Kerr (footballer, born 1948), Australian footballer for Carlton Football Club
- Peter Kerr (footballer, born 1954), Australian footballer for South Melbourne Football Club
- Peter Kerr (political scientist) (born 1967), senior lecturer in political science at the University of Birmingham
- Peter Kerr (priest) (1775–?), member of the Church of Jesus Christ of Latter-Day Saints
- Peter Kerr (Texas settler) (1795–1861), founder of Burnet, Texas and a member of the Old Three Hundred
- Peter Kerr (water polo), Australian water polo official, swore the judge oath at the 2000 Summer Olympics

== See also ==
- Peter Carr (disambiguation)
