= The History Boys =

Play by British playwright Alan Bennett

- Original (2004) Royal National Theatre cast
- Original language: English
- Written by: Alan Bennett
- Characters: Headmaster; Hector; Irwin; Mrs. Lintott; Akthar; Crowther; Dakin; Lockwood; Posner; Rudge; Scripps; Timms
- Subject: An unruly bunch of bright, funny boys in pursuit of sex, sport and a place at university.
- Genre: Comedy-drama
- Setting: 1980s

Premiere
- Date: 18 May 2004
- Place: Royal National Theatre, London

The History Boys is a play by the British playwright Alan Bennett. The play premiered at the Royal National Theatre in London's West End on 18 May 2004. Its Broadway debut was on 23 April 2006 at the Broadhurst Theatre where 185 performances were staged before it closed on 1 October 2006.

The play won multiple awards, including the 2005 Laurence Olivier Award for Best New Play and the 2006 Tony Award for Best Play.

== Plot ==
The play opens in Cutlers' Grammar School, Sheffield, a fictional boys' grammar school in the north of England. Set in the mid-late 1980s, the play follows a group of history pupils preparing for the Oxford and Cambridge entrance examinations under the guidance of three teachers (Hector, Irwin, and Lintott) with contrasting styles.

Hector, an eccentric teacher, delights in knowledge for its own sake but his ambitious headmaster wants the school to move up the academic league table and hires Irwin, a supply teacher, to introduce a rather more cynical and ruthless style of teaching. Hector is discovered sexually fondling a boy and later Irwin's latent homosexual inclinations emerge.

== Characters ==
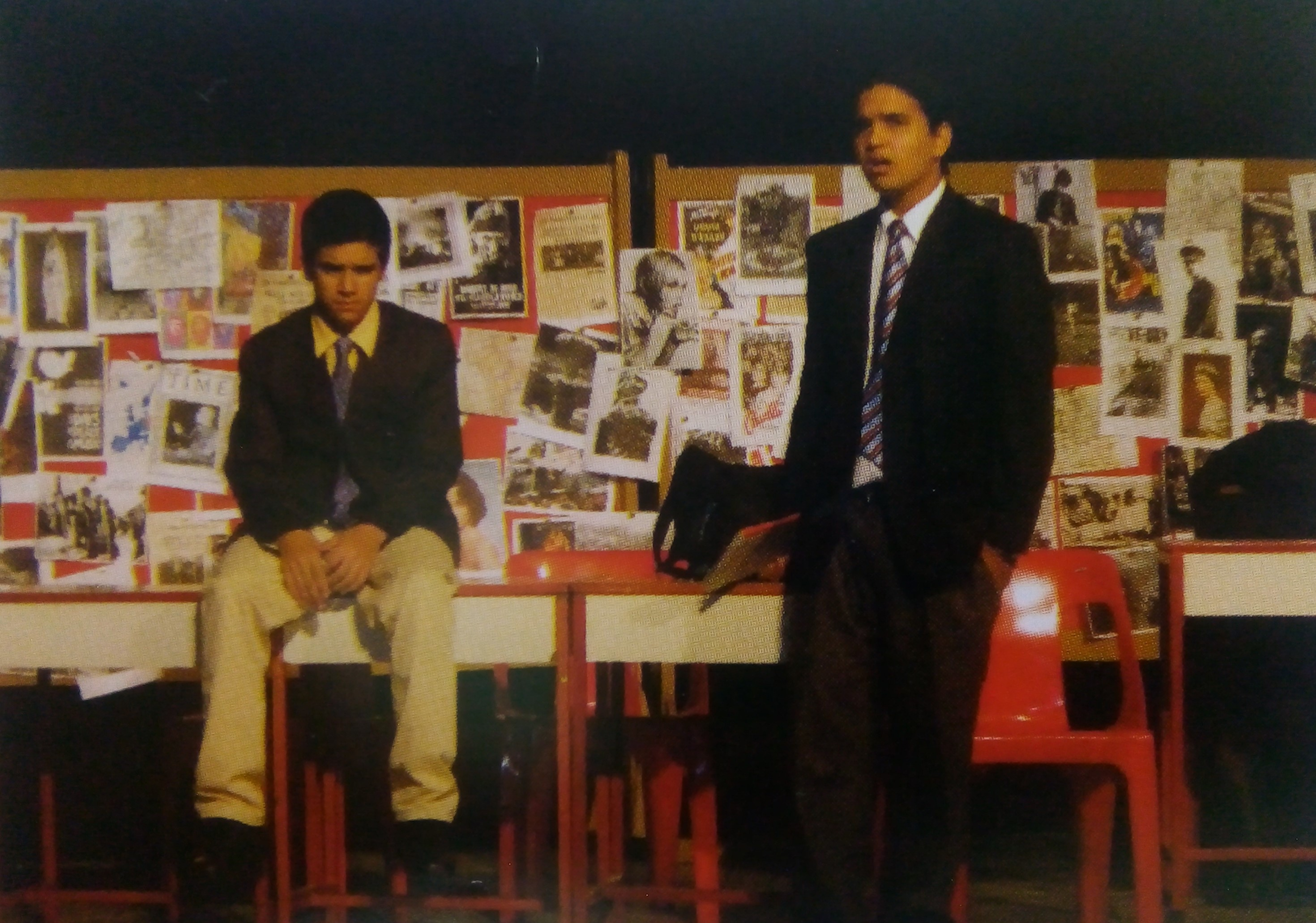
A 2007 production of The History Boys at The Doon School, India; a scene featuring Irwin (played by Vivaan Shah, then a student) and Posner

- Headmaster
- Hector – English and General Studies teacher
- Irwin – History teacher; brought in as a special coach
- Mrs Dorothy Lintott – History teacher
- Akthar – Pupil; of Asian ancestry, Muslim
- Crowther – Pupil; acts as a hobby
- Dakin – Pupil; handsome, object of Posner's and Irwin's affection
- Lockwood – Pupil; strong opinions
- Posner – Pupil; youngest, gay and Jewish
- Rudge – Pupil; better known for athletic skills than for intelligence
- Scripps – Pupil; Anglican, plays piano
- Timms – Pupil; joker, overweight
- Director on Irwin's television programme (a small role)

Irwin is said to be modelled after Niall Ferguson.

The play includes several non-speaking roles:

- Make-Up Woman, Production team – on Irwin's television show
- Three or four unidentified MPs – spoken to by Irwin in opening scene
- Other male pupils
- Fiona – Headmaster's secretary; object of Dakin's affection. Does not appear on stage in the published text, but was seen in filmed projections featuring Rio by Duran Duran during the original production.

== Productions ==
=== Original production ===
==== Royal National Theatre (2004-06) ====
The play opened at the Lyttelton Theatre (part of the National Theatre) in London on 18 May 2004, directed by Nicholas Hytner. It played to sell-out audiences and its limited run was frequently extended. Richard Griffiths, Frances de la Tour, James Corden, Dominic Cooper, Russell Tovey, Sacha Dhawan, Samuel Barnett, Jamie Parker and Andrew Knott were among the original cast. On 24 November 2005, the same production was revived once again at the Lyttelton Theatre, where it played another successful run. Matt Smith took on the role of Lockwood in the November 2005 revision of the cast. The original cast reunited in the final week in February 2006.

==== International tour (2006) ====
Following closing in London, the National Theatre production toured to Hong Kong in February 2006 and featured in the 2006 New Zealand International Arts Festival held in Wellington (February 2006) before playing at the Sydney Theatre in Sydney, Australia from 4 March to 8 April 2006. At each venue, the play was presented to sell-out audiences with the original London cast, including Richard Griffiths; however, Frances de la Tour and Clive Merrison were replaced by Maggie Steed and Malcolm Sinclair until the Broadway season.

==== Broadway (2006) ====
The American premiere of the play took place on 23 April 2006 when the same National production opened on Broadway at the Broadhurst Theatre. Originally scheduled to run through 2 September 2006, the run was extended through to 8 October 2006 following huge public demand after the show won the Tony, New York Critics Circle and other American theatrical awards.

==== West End (2007-08) ====
Following its Broadway triumph and second UK tour, the play opened at London's Wyndham's Theatre on 2 January 2007, following previews from 20 December 2006. The production closed on 14 April 2007. A further West End run of the play opened once again at Wyndham's Theatre on 20 December 2007 running through 26 April 2008.

==== UK and Ireland tour (2005-07) ====
The first national tour of the production opened in 2005, continuing to play nine regional venues. A second Britain wide tour began on 31 August 2006 at the Birmingham Repertory Theatre, touring to eight further venues. The third tour launched on 6 September 2007 at the Theatre Royal, Plymouth, before continuing to Truro, Cheltenham, Bath, Dublin, Blackpool, Leeds, Cambridge and Eastbourne, culminating in Newcastle on 10 November 2007.

==== West End revival (2027) ====
On 22 October 2026, it was announced that a revival of the original National Theatre production will open at the Theatre Royal Haymarket from 10 April to 24 July 2027. Hytner and Crowley will both return as director and designer. Casting is to be announced.

==== Royal National Theatre casts ====
Role	First cast	Second cast	Third cast	Fourth cast
Role	18 May 2004 to 2005, 23 January 2006 to 1 February 2006 (international tour, film adaptation)	24 November 2005 to January 2006 (UK tour)	31 August 2006 to 14 April 2007	6 September 2007 to 26 April 2008
Headmaster	Clive Merrison Malcolm Sinclair (23 January 2006 to 28 January 2006, international tour until Broadway)	Bruce Alexander	William Chubb	David Mallinson
Hector	Richard Griffiths	Desmond Barrit	Stephen Moore	Desmond Barrit
Irwin	Stephen Campbell Moore Geoffrey Streatfeild (20 December 2004 to 2005)	Tobias Menzies	Orlando Wells	Tim Delap
Mrs Lintott	Frances de la Tour Maggie Steed (23 January 2006 to 28 January 2006, international tour until Broadway)	Diane Fletcher	Isla Blair	Elizabeth Bell
Akthar	Sacha Dhawan	Marc Elliott	Marc Elliott	Alton Letto
Crowther	Samuel Anderson	Kenny Thompson	Akemnji Ndifornyen	Nathan Stewart-Jarrett
Dakin	Dominic Cooper	Jamie King	Ben Barnes (pre February 2007) Jamie King (post February 2007)	Andrew Hawley
Lockwood	Andrew Knott	Matt Smith	David Poynor	Sam Phillips
Posner	Samuel Barnett	Steven Webb	Steven Webb	Daniel Fine
Rudge	Russell Tovey	Philip Correia	Philip Correia	Ryan Hawley
Scripps	Jamie Parker	Thomas Morrison	Thomas Morrison	Thomas Howes
Timms	James Corden	James Cartwright	Owain Arthur	Danny Kirrane

A majority of the original cast reunited on 2 November 2013 for the National Theatre 50th Anniversary special and performed the French lesson scene, with Philip Correia taking over for Russell Tovey, Marc Elliott performing as Akthar, original Akthar actor Sacha Dhawan as Posner (as Samuel Barnett was performing in Richard III/Twelfth Night on Broadway at the time) and playwright Alan Bennett taking over as Hector from Richard Griffiths, who had died in March 2013.

=== West Yorkshire Playhouse / Theatre Royal Bath tour ===
A fourth national tour co-produced by the West Yorkshire Playhouse and Theatre Royal Bath commenced in early 2010. This was a new production not produced by the National Theatre and directed by Christopher Luscombe. The cast were as follows:

- Headmaster: Thomas Wheatley
- Hector: Gerard Murphy
- Irwin: Ben Lambert
- Mrs. Lintott: Penny Beaumont
- Akthar: Beruce Khan
- Crowther: Tom Reed
- Dakin: Kyle Redmond-Jones
- Lockwood: George Banks
- Posner: James Byng
- Rudge: Peter McGovern
- Scripps: Rob Delaney
- Timms: Christopher Keegan

After a successful run the West Yorkshire Playhouse/Bath Theatre Royal production was revived for 2011 with the following cast:

- Headmaster: Thomas Wheatley
- Hector: Philip Franks
- Irwin: Ben Lambert
- Mrs. Lintott: Penny Beaumont
- Akthar: Beruce Khan
- Crowther: Michael Lyle
- Dakin: George Banks
- Lockwood: Ryan Saunders
- Posner: Rob Delaney
- Rudge: Peter McGovern
- Scripps: Harry Waller
- Timms: Christopher Keegan

=== Other productions ===
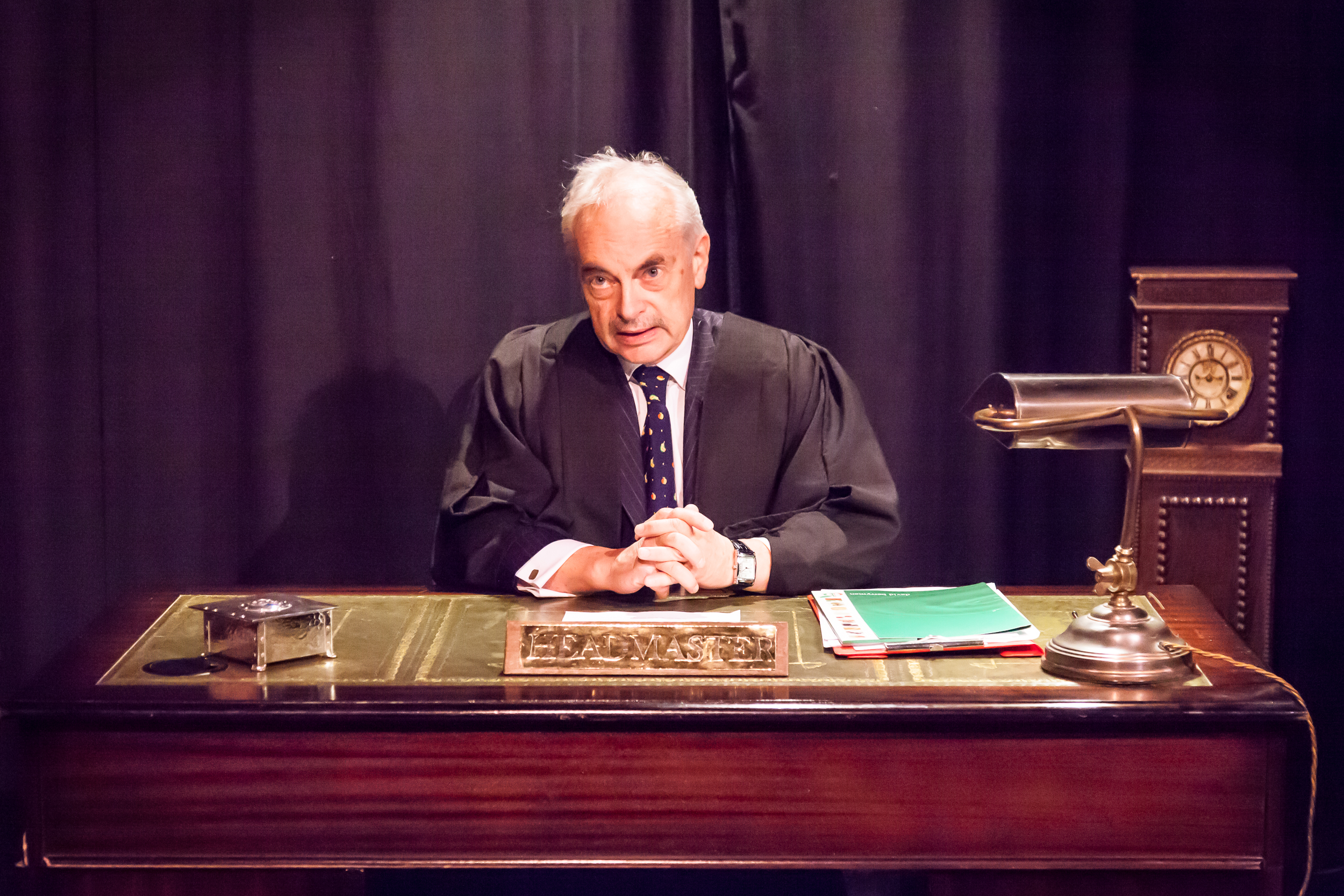
The Headmaster, in a 2014 production by OVO theatre company, St Albans, UK

- The first non-professional UK production was staged by Daisy and Rose Theatre Productions at Ermysted's Grammar School in Skipton, North Yorkshire, on 28–30 August 2008.
- A Catalan adaptation debuted on 24 September 2008 at Teatre Goya in Barcelona. Director: Josep Maria Pou.
- In the spring of 2009, the play was produced across the United States in several regional premieres. On the west coast, a Seattle production ran from 4 March to 28 March 2009, at ArtsWest Playhouse. The play had its southwest premiere at Uptown Players, in Dallas, from 3 April to 3 May 2009. And the play made its Chicago premiere on 25 April 2009, at TimeLine Theatre.
- The play had its amateur debut in Melbourne, Australia, performed at the Cromwell Road Theatre from 18–25 July 2009 and directed by Bryce Ives . The first amateur production of the play (text released by Samuel French, Inc.) was performed at the St Helens Theatre Royal, on 19–22 August 2009.
- The Netherlands premiere was presented on 1 October 2009 by The Queen's English Theatre Company at the CREA Theater, Amsterdam – featuring an English mother-tongue cast, starring Brian André as Hector and directed by Mark Winstanley. The same production formed the play's premiere at the Edinburgh International Festival in August 2010.
- An Italian adaptation debuted on 19 September 2010 at Teatro ElfoPuccini in Milan, directed by Elio de Capitani and Ferdinando Bruni. It won the Premio UBU 2011 as best show.
- The Sydney debut was performed at the Sydney Opera House by the Peach Theatre Company from 8 February to 2 March 2013, starring John Wood as Hector, Heather Mitchell as Mrs Linnott, Paul Goddard as Headmaster, James Mackay as Irwin, Dakin: Lindsay Farris, Scripps: Aaron Tsindos. Crowther: Simon Brook McLachlan. Lockwood: Caleb Alloway. Arthur: James Elliott. Posner:Matthew Backer. Rudge: Gary Brun. Timms: Matt Hardie and is directed by Jesse Peach.

== Film adaptation ==
In October 2006, a film adaptation of the play was released in the United States, and later in November 2006 in the UK. The film, also titled The History Boys, was directed by Nicholas Hytner and featured the original stage cast.

== Awards and nominations ==
=== Original London production ===
Year	Award ceremony	Category	Nominee	Result
2005	Laurence Olivier Award	Best New Play		Won
2005	Laurence Olivier Award	Best Actor in a Play	Richard Griffiths	Won
2005	Laurence Olivier Award	Best Performance in a Supporting Role	Samuel Barnett	Nominated
2005	Laurence Olivier Award	Best Director	Nicholas Hytner	Won

=== Original Broadway production ===
Year	Award ceremony	Category	Nominee	Result
2006	Tony Award	Best Play	Alan Bennett	Won
2006	Tony Award	Best Performance by a Leading Actor in a Play	Richard Griffiths	Won
2006	Tony Award	Best Performance by a Featured Actor in a Play	Samuel Barnett	Nominated
2006	Tony Award	Best Performance by a Featured Actress in a Play	Frances de la Tour	Won
2006	Tony Award	Best Direction of a Play	Nicholas Hytner	Won
2006	Tony Award	Best Scenic Design of a Play	Bob Crowley	Won
2006	Tony Award	Best Lighting Design of a Play	Mark Henderson	Won
2006	Drama Desk Award	Outstanding Play	Alan Bennett	Won
2006	Drama Desk Award	Outstanding Actor in a Play	Richard Griffiths	Won
2006	Drama Desk Award	Outstanding Featured Actor in a Play	Samuel Barnett	Won
2006	Drama Desk Award	Outstanding Featured Actor in a Play	Stephen Campbell Moore	Nominated
2006	Drama Desk Award	Outstanding Featured Actor in a Play	Dominic Cooper	Nominated
2006	Drama Desk Award	Outstanding Featured Actress in a Play	Frances de la Tour	Won
2006	Drama Desk Award	Outstanding Director of a Play	Nicholas Hynter	Won
2006	Outer Critics Circle Award	Outstanding New Broadway Play		Won
2006	Outer Critics Circle Award	Outstanding Featured Actor in a Play	Richard Griffiths	Won
2006	Outer Critics Circle Award	Outstanding Featured Actress in a Play	Frances de la Tour	Won
2006	Outer Critics Circle Award	Outstanding Director of a Play	Nicholas Hynter	Won
2006	New York Drama Critics' Circle Award	Best Play	Alan Bennett	Won
2006	Drama League Award	Outstanding New Broadway Play		Won
2006	Drama League Award	Distinguished Production of a Play		Won
2006	Theatre World Award		Richard Griffiths	Won
