= Kevin Wallace =

Kevin Wallace may refer to:

- Kevin Wallace (theatre producer)
- Kevin Wallace (politician)
