= Peter Carr =

Peter Carr may refer to:

- Peter Carr (New Zealand politician) (1884–1946), New Zealand member of parliament
- Peter Carr (footballer) (born 1951), English soccer player
- Peter Carr (Virginia politician) (1770–1815), Virginia politician
- Peter Carr (public servant) (1930–2017), British public servant
- Peter P. Carr (1890–1966), American grocer and Wisconsin state senator
- Pete Carr (1950–2020), American guitarist
- Peter Carr (speedway rider) (born 1963), English speedway rider

== See also ==
- Peter Kerr (disambiguation)
