= James Byng =

English actor (born 1985)

- Born: 1985 (age 40–41)
- Occupation: Actor
- Years active: 1995 – present
- Website: http://www.jamesbyng.com/

James Byng (born 1985) is an English actor and vocalist. Acting since the age of ten, James made his West End debut in the title role of Oliver! at the London Palladium. He played the same role in the national tour of Oliver! and at the Royal Charity Gala Hey! Mr. Producer, honoring theatrical producer Cameron Mackintosh at the Lyceum Theatre on 8 June 1998. Byng also played Gavroche in Les Misérables at the Palace Theatre. From 2007 to 2008 he was seen on stage at the Theatre Royal, Drury Lane, first playing various ensemble roles and then taking over the part of Frodo Baggins in Matthew Warchus' theatrical adaption of The Lord of the Rings. In 2008-09 Byng appeared in the role of John Darling in the musical Peter Pan at the West Yorkshire Playhouse in Leeds. He just finished a tour with the West Yorkshire Playhouse production of The History Boys by Alan Bennet, in which he played Posner. From September until November 2010 Byng was on tour with a production of Carrie's War in the role of Nick Willow. After performing in Secret Cinema - Back to the Future he can currently be seen in The Grimm Tales at The Bargehouse at Oxo Tower Wharf.

Byng's television and film work includes the role of George Hawthorne in the 2002 television adaptation of Goodbye Mr. Chips, starring Martin Clunes which aired both in Great Britain and in the United States. In this made-for-television film he appeared as James Malcolm. He also played wayward American Montague Bear in the independent film Rupert Brockstein's Blood Red Letters.

In 2017, he played the role of The Actor in The Woman in Black at The Fortune Theatre in the West End.

Byng has also been host and resident jazz vocalist at the Starlight Theatre, Manchester, and the Grove Inn Jazz Club in Leeds.

== Stage ==
- Oliver in Oliver!, London Palladium
- Oliver in Hey! Mr. Producer, Lyceum Theatre
- Gavroche in Les Misérables, Palace Theatre
- Oliver in Oliver! UK Tour, Theatre Royal, Plymouth
- Hobbit, Orc and other roles in The Lord of the Rings, Theatre Royal Drury Lane
- Frodo Baggins in The Lord of the Rings, Theatre Royal Drury Lane
- John Darling in Peter Pan, West Yorkshire Playhouse, Leeds
- David Posner in The History Boys, UK Tour
- Nick Willow in Carrie's War, UK Tour
- Prince/Soldier/Son/Beautiful Bird in The Grimm Tales, Shoreditch Town Hall
- Texatone in Secret Cinema - Back to the Future, Leeds
- Frog King and Young King in The Grimm Tales, The Bargehouse at Oxo Tower Wharf

== Television and film ==
- George Hawthorne in Goodbye Mr. Chips
- Montague Bear in Rupert Brockstein's Blood Red Letters

== Music videos ==
- Office clown in "Raoul" by The Automatic

== Recordings ==
- Hey! Mr. Producer: Cast Album
- The Lord of the Rings: Original Cast Album
- Peter Pan: 2008/2009 Cast Album
