= The Lord of the Rings (musical) =

2006 stage musical

- Music: A. R. Rahman; Värttinä; Christopher Nightingale
- Lyrics: Shaun McKenna; Matthew Warchus
- Book: Shaun McKenna; Matthew Warchus
- Setting: Middle-earth
- Basis: The Lord of the Rings by J. R. R. Tolkien
- Premiere: March 23, 2006: Princess of Wales Theatre, Toronto
- Productions: 2006 Toronto; 2007 West End; 2023 Berkshire; 2024 Chicago; 2024 Auckland; 2025 Sydney/Australian tour; 2025 Singapore

The Lord of the Rings is a stage musical with music by A. R. Rahman, Värttinä, and Christopher Nightingale, and lyrics and book by Shaun McKenna and Matthew Warchus, based on the novel of the same name by J. R. R. Tolkien. It is the most prominent of several theatre adaptations of the novel. Set in the world of Middle-earth, the musical tells the tale of a humble hobbit who is asked to play the hero and undertake a treacherous mission to destroy an evil, magic ring without being seduced by its power.

The musical has been performed in four professional productions. It was first performed in 2006 at the Princess of Wales Theatre in Toronto. The second production opened at Theatre Royal, Drury Lane in London's West End in June 2007 where it played until July 2008. The musical was revived in 2023 at the Watermill Theatre in Berkshire, winning Best Regional Production in TheWhatsOnStage Awards 2024. The Watermill production was announced to open in July 2024 at the Chicago Shakespeare Theater, before transferring to the Civic Theatre in Auckland, New Zealand in November 2024. In January 2025, the production embarked on an Australian tour, opening with a new cast at the State Theatre in Sydney. An international tour continued to the Sands Theatre at the Marina Bay Sands Resort, Singapore in August 2025 before it was due to return to the UK for a run at the Theatre Royal, Plymouth in October 2025, before embarking on a European tour. The Plymouth run was cancelled in September 2025, with the status of any potential future productions being unknown.

== Productions ==
=== Toronto ===
The London-based theatre producer Kevin Wallace and his partner, Saul Zaentz, who held the stage and film rights, in association with Toronto theatre owner David Mirvish and concert promoter Michael Cohl, produced a stage musical adaptation. The book and lyrics were written by Shaun McKenna and Matthew Warchus. The music was by A. R. Rahman and Värttinä, collaborating with Christopher Nightingale. The three-and-a-half-hour-long three-act production, with a cast of 65 actors, was mounted in Toronto, Canada, at the Princess of Wales Theatre, at a cost of approximately C$30 million. It was promoted as a spectacle of unusual scale. It starred Brent Carver as Gandalf and Michael Therriault as Gollum, and was directed by Matthew Warchus and choreographed by Peter Darling, with set and costume design by Rob Howell. The production began performances on 4 February 2006, had its opening on 23 March 2006, and its final performance on 3 September 2006. The show played to almost 400,000 people in Toronto. It was nominated for 15 Dora Awards, winning 7, including Outstanding New Musical and awards for direction, design and choreography. It received wide-ranging critical reaction, including both positive and hostile reviews from the press. Richard Corliss of Time Magazine described it as "ingenious" and a "definitive megamusical". Variety labelled it "a saga of short people burdened by power jewellery". The Toronto Star dubbed it "Bored of the Rings". Ben Brantley of the New York Times said it was "largely incomprehensible", explaining that "Everyone and everything winds up lost," ... "includ(ing) plot, character and the patience of most ordinary theatergoers."

=== London ===
The significantly re-written show, shortened to three hours, began previews at the Theatre Royal, Drury Lane on 9 May 2007, with its official premiere on 19 June 2007. The same creative team as the Toronto production was involved in the London production, with only four cast members reprising their roles from Toronto—James Loye (Frodo), Owen Sharpe (Pippin), Peter Howe (Sam) and Michael Therriault (Gollum). The production featured a cast of 50 actors and reportedly cost £12 million (approximately US$25 million), making it one of the most expensive musicals ever produced in the West End. It was nominated for 7 Whatsonstage Theatregoer's Choice Awards in 2007 and 5 Olivier Awards in 2008, including book and lyrics, lighting (Paul Pyant), sets and costumes (both Rob Howell) and sound. The production took its final bow on 20 July 2008, after 492 performances over a 13-month run.

The production received mixed reviews from critics. Among the positive reviews, The Times called it "a brave, stirring, epic piece of popular theatre" and The Guardian gave the show a four star rating, calling it "a hugely impressive production". In The Stage, Mark Shenton wrote the production "both looks and behaves as a spectacular piece of music theatre, and there isn't a single production element that doesn't impress and frequently thrill. Despite several positive reviews, Amol Rajan in The Independent wrote that it had "received a critical mauling throughout most of its run", leading to its closure. It was remarked upon at the time for its lack of commercial success. Susannah Clapp in The Observer called the stage design "gargantuan" with "a terrific, house-size spider", "black-leather Orcs ... like scarab Richard IIIs" and "long-winded ents ... on stilts". The trouble, she wrote, was that none of these characters "moves events along with any urgency."

The London original cast recording was released on 4 February 2008, and features 18 musical numbers from the show.

=== Later productions ===
In 2013, Playbill announced that the show would be revived for a world tour in 2015. The first location for the tour would have been in New Zealand, but dates and other locations were never announced.

In 2023, the Watermill Theatre, Bagnor, Berkshire, revived a scaled-down version of the show for a 12-week run as The Lord of the Rings: A Musical Tale.

In 2024, the Watermill production was announced to be making its North American premiere at the Chicago Shakespeare Theater, running from 19 July to 1 September. It was also confirmed that the production would go on an international tour. In November 2024, the production made its New Zealand premiere, with a limited run at the Civic Theatre, Auckland to positive reviews from the New Zealand Herald and Radio New Zealand. The production opened at the State Theatre in Sydney, Australia with a new cast on 7 January 2025 before embarking on an Australian tour to Perth, Melbourne and the Gold Coast, followed by a season at Marina Bay Sands, Singapore.

== Synopsis ==
=== Act I ===
The half-Elven maiden Arwen sings the prologue, urging those to whom she sings to trust their instincts ("Prologue" ('Lasto i lamath')). In the region of Middle-earth known as the Shire, Bilbo Baggins, an eccentric and wealthy Hobbit, celebrates his eleventyfirst birthday by vanishing from his birthday party, leaving his greatest treasure, a mysterious magic Ring, to his young relative Frodo Baggins ("Springle Ring"). The Ring is greatly desired by the Dark Lord Sauron, who could use it to conquer the world, and must be destroyed in the fires of Mount Doom in Mordor. Frodo and his friends Samwise Gamgee, Merry Brandybuck and Pippin Took set out along the road that leads out of the Shire, where they meet a group of Elves led by Elránien, an original female character who fills the role of Gildor Inglorion from the source material ("The Road Goes On"). Meanwhile, the corrupt wizard Saruman also desires the Ring ("Saruman").

At the Inn of the Prancing Pony in the village of Bree, Frodo and his friends sing and dance for their fellow guests ("The Cat and the Moon"). With the assistance of the Ranger Strider, the four Hobbits escape pursuit by the Black Riders, servants of Sauron, and safely reach the Ford of Bruinen ("Flight to the Ford"). Awaiting them at the Elven settlement of Rivendell is Arwen, the beloved of Strider, whose true name is Aragorn, heir to the throne of Gondor ("The Song of Hope"). Arwen's father, Lord Elrond, calls a Council of Elves, Men and Dwarves at which it is decided that Frodo will carry the Ring to Mordor. The Fellowship of the Ring sets out from Rivendell: Frodo and his three fellow Hobbits, Aragorn, the warrior Boromir, the Elf Legolas, the Dwarf Gimli, and the wizard Gandalf. Arwen and the people of Rivendell invoke the power of the star Eärendil to protect and guide the Fellowship on its journey ("Star of Eärendil"). In the ancient, ruined Dwarf-mines of Moria, Gandalf confronts a Balrog, a monstrous creature of evil, and falls into the darkness.

=== Act II ===
The Fellowship takes refuge in Lothlórien, the mystical realm of Galadriel, an Elven lady of great power and wisdom ("The Golden Wood", "Lothlórien"). As their journey south continues, Boromir attempts to take the Ring from Frodo; Frodo and Sam flee from the rest of the Fellowship, and Boromir falls in battle. Gandalf returns in time to intervene at the Siege of the City of Kings, where the Lands of Men are under attack by the forces of Saruman and the Orcs of Mordor ("The Siege of the City of Kings"). Meanwhile, Frodo and Sam are joined on their journey by Gollum, a wretched creature who possessed the Ring for centuries and desires to have it for his own again. As they approach Mordor, Frodo and Sam sing to each other about the power of stories ("Now and for Always"). Gollum is moved by their song, but the evil side of his personality asserts itself and he plans to betray the Hobbits ("Gollum/Sméagol").

=== Act III ===
If Aragorn can defeat the forces of evil and reclaim the kingship of Men, he will receive Arwen's hand in marriage ("The Song of Hope (Duet)"). Meanwhile, Gollum leads Sam and Frodo to the lair of an enormous spider named Shelob so he can take the Ring from Frodo when he is dead, but the hobbits manage to survive and make their way to Mount Doom. Galadriel casts spells to protect the forces of good in the final battle ("Wonder", "The Final Battle"). Frodo and Sam finally reach the Cracks of Doom to destroy the Ring once and for all, but Frodo is consumed by the Ring's power and claims it for himself. Suddenly, Gollum reappears and takes the Ring from Frodo, but he loses his balance and falls into the fire with it. With the Ring's destruction, Sauron is defeated and the dominion of Men begins. Aragorn becomes King and marries Arwen ("City of Kings"), but Frodo, wearied by his quest, decides to leave Middle-earth forever and sail with Bilbo, Gandalf and the Great Elves to the lands of the West ("Epilogue (Farewells)"). After bidding farewell to their friend, Sam, Merry and Pippin return to the Shire ("Finale").

== Production changes ==
During the scene at the Ford, Elrond was originally present in Toronto. In London however, Elrond is replaced by Glorfindel. Toronto also featured a scene in which Galadriel, Arwen, and Elrond, even though they are not physically present, view the action through magic. When the show moved to London, the prologue scene, which was shown as a shadow play, was completely absent. In addition, "Galadriel's Song" was transferred from the Lothlórien scene in Act Two to Act Three. The whole Lothlórien scene was also redesigned, and the script tightened, with many characters from Toronto being completely cut.

In the 2023 Watermill Theatre production, the show was changed from having three acts to only having two. In this revision, the act break happens following the death of Boromir and the departure of Sam and Frodo. Act Two begins with the introduction of Gollum into the story.

== Casts ==
Character	Toronto	London	Berkshire	Chicago	Sydney
Character	2006	2007	2023	2024	2025
Bilbo Baggins	Cliff Saunders	Terence Frisch	John O'Mahony	Rick Hall	Laurence Coy
Samwise "Sam" Gamgee	Peter Howe	Peter Howe	Nuwan Hugh Perera	Michael Kurowski	Wern Mak
Rose "Rosie" Cotton	Kristin Galer	Kirsty Malpass	Charlotte Grayson	Suzanne Hannau	Ruby Clark
Frodo Baggins	James Loye	James Loye	Louis Maskell	Spencer Davis Milford	Rarmian Newton
Gandalf the Grey / Gandalf the White	Brent Carver	Malcolm Storry	Peter Marinker	Tom Amandes	Terence Crawford
Peregrin "Pippin" Took	Owen Sharpe	Owen Sharpe	Amelia Gabriel	Ben Mathew	Hannah Buckley
Meriadoc "Merry" Brandybuck	Dylan Roberts	Richard Henders	Geraint Downing	Eileen Doan	Jeremi Campese
Elránien	Monique Lund	Alexandra Bonnet	Sioned Saunders	Bernadette Santos Schwegel	Gianna Cheung
Saruman the White	Richard McMillan	Brian Protheroe	Tom Giles	Jeff Parker	Ian Stenlake
Barliman Butterbur	Shawn Wright	Tim Parker	Bridget Lappin	Joey Faggion	James Whiting
Bill Ferny	Patrick McManus	Michael Hobbs	Reece Causton	Adam Qutaishat	David Cuny
Strider / Aragorn	Evan Buliung	Jérôme Pradon	Aaron Sidwell	Will James Jr.	Rob Mallett
Glorfindel	—N/a	Alma Ferovic	—N/a	—N/a	—N/a
Arwen Undómiel	Carly Street	Rosalie Craig	Aoife O'Dea	Alina Taber	Stefanie Caccamo
Lord Elrond	Victor A. Young	Andrew Jarvis	Tom Giles	Jeff Parker	Andrew Broadbent
Boromir	Dion Johnstone	Steven Miller	Peter Dukes	Matthew C. Yee	Rohan Campbell
Gimli	Ross Williams	Sévan Stephan	Folarin Akinmade	Ian Maryfield	Connor Morel
Legolas Greenleaf	Gabriel Burrafato	Michael Rouse	Yazdan Qafouri	Justin Albinder	Conor Neylon
Gollum / Sméagol	Michael Therriault	Michael Therriault	Matthew Bugg	Tony Bozzuto	Laurence Boxhall
Haldir	Fraser Walters	Wayne Fitzsimmons	Elliot Mackenzie	Arik Vega	Anthony Garcia
Lady Galadriel	Rebecca Jackson Mendoza	Laura Michelle Kelly	Georgia Louise/Sioned Saunders	Lauren Zakrin	Jemma Rix
Treebeard	Shawn Wright	Michael Hobbs	Peter Dukes	John Lithgow	Terence Crawford
Steward of the Lands of Men	—N/a	Tim Morgan	John O'Mahony	Rick Hall	Laurence Coy

=== Notable replacements ===
==== London (2007–2008) ====
Frodo Baggins: James Byng

== Musical numbers ==
Act I

- "Springle Ring" – Company
- "Prologue" ('Lasto i lamath') – Arwen
- "The Road Goes On" – Frodo, Sam, Pippin, Merry and Company
- "Saruman" – Female Voices
- "The Cat and the Moon" – Frodo, Sam, Pippin, Merry and Company
- "Flight to the Ford" – Glorfindel and Female Voices
- "The Song of Hope" – Arwen
- "Star of Eärendil" – Arwen and Company
- "Lament for Moria" – Gandalf and Gimli

Act II

- "The Golden Wood" – Company
- "Lothlórien" – Legolas, Galadriel and Company
- "Lothlórien" (Reprise) – Galadriel and Company
- "The Siege of the City of Kings" – Female Voices
- "Now and for Always" – Frodo and Sam
- "Gollum/Sméagol" – Gollum/Sméagol

Act III

- "The Song of Hope" (Duet) – Aragorn and Arwen
- "Wonder" – Galadriel
- "The Final Battle" – Galadriel
- "City of Kings" – Company
- "Epilogue (Farewells)"
- "Finale" – Company

== Awards and nominations ==
Year	Award	Category	Nominee	Result
2008	Laurence Olivier Award	Best New Musical		Nominated
2008	Laurence Olivier Award	Best Set Design	Rob Howell	Nominated
2008	Laurence Olivier Award	Best Costume Design	Rob Howell	Nominated
2008	Laurence Olivier Award	Best Lighting Design	Paul Pyant	Nominated
2008	Laurence Olivier Award	Best Sound Design	Simon Baker	Nominated
