= Geoff Anderson =

English footballer

Personal information
- Full name: Geoffrey Thomas Anderson
- Date of birth: 26 November 1944 (age 81)
- Place of birth: Sheerness, England
- Position: Right winger

Senior career*
Years	Team	Apps	(Gls)
1960–1962	Ramsgate		
1962–1964	Birmingham City	1	(0)
1964–1966	Mansfield Town	43	(13)
1966–1967	Lincoln City	44	(6)
- * Club domestic league appearances and goals

Geoffrey Thomas Anderson (born 26 November 1944) is an English former professional footballer who scored 19 goals in 88 appearances in the Football League playing for Birmingham City, Mansfield Town and Lincoln City. He played as a right winger.

== Career ==
Anderson was born in Sheerness, Kent. He played football for Canterbury Schools and Southern League side Ramsgate before joining Birmingham City in December 1962. He was one of three teenagers who made their debuts on 11 January 1964 away at Manchester United in the First Division, the other two being Mickey Bullock and Ray Martin. Birmingham won the game 2–1, but Anderson never played for the club again; he signed for Mansfield Town in May 1964. In two seasons, he scored 13 goals in 43 games in the Third Division. Then he moved on to Fourth Division club Lincoln City. After scoring seven goals in 48 appearances in all competitions in the 1966–67 season, he left the club. He finished his career with short spells at Brentford and Port Vale, though did not play a first-team game for either club.

== Career statistics ==
Appearances and goals by club, season and competition
Club	Season	League			FA Cup		League Cup		Total	
Club	Season	Division	Apps	Goals	Apps	Goals	Apps	Goals	Apps	Goals
Birmingham City	1962–63	First Division	0	0	0	0	0	0	0	0
Birmingham City	1963–64	First Division	1	0	0	0	0	0	1	0
Birmingham City	Total		1	0	0	0	0	0	1	0
Mansfield Town	1964–65	Third Division	14	4	1	0	0	0	15	4
Mansfield Town	1965–66	Third Division	29	9	0	0	0	0	29	9
Mansfield Town	Total		43	13	1	0	0	0	44	13
Lincoln City	1966–67	Fourth Division	44	6	1	0	3	1	48	7
Career total			88	19	2	0	3	1	93	20
