= Megamusical =

Large-scale musical

A megamusical (also known as a "spectacle show", "blockbuster musical", or "extravaganza") is a large-scale musical produced for large commercial profit. Such musicals utilize spectacle and increased technology to "radicalize the imagistic potential of musical theatre." Early concepts of the megamusical came into existence in the 1970s, and the form was established and popularized in the 1980s by individuals such as Andrew Lloyd Webber and Cameron Mackintosh. Megamusical is analogous to the film industry term "blockbuster".

Notable megamusicals include Cats (1981), Les Misérables (1985), The Phantom of the Opera (1986), The Lion King (1997), Wicked (2003) and Hamilton (2015).

== Characteristics ==
Megamusicals are known for their grand scale. They tend to be set in the distant past and cover broad, universal issues (usually concerning social justice) that global audiences can relate to. The plot is generally melodramatic, ambitious in scope, but not the focus of the show. Instead, a megamusical's priority is a visual spectacle, with ample attention given to visual elements like extravagant set and costumes, complex and technologically advanced stagecraft, and large casts that allow for big ensemble numbers with elaborate choreography.

The scores for megamusicals are also grand, consisting of pop-influenced catchy songs, power ballads, lush harmonies and lavish orchestrations. Similar to operetta, this genre relies on the "continuous musicalization of dramatic action", and commonly feature a sung-through script in which the recitative is used to carry any dialogue in between musical numbers. As such, they are also referred to as "pop-operas".

Megamusicals have huge budgets and their non-artistic elements tend to be large as well. They are heavily publicized and the marketing for a megamusical is very intense and costly. Another key element of this form is its commercial appeal: whether or not the musical will be a hit at the box office. Generally, a megamusical is expected to be a massive financial success, but not necessarily a critical success.

A "big" Broadway musical is not necessarily a megamusical. One major difference between long-running Broadway productions, such as A Chorus Line and Chicago, and successful megamusicals is that the latter are global franchises. While musicals had long been an American institution, they gained unprecedented global recognition and success with the advent of megamusicals in the 1980s. Megamusicals are intended to be mass-reproduced worldwide and the successful ones run for decades in international markets. Once his musicals became famous and were being licensed all over the world, composer Andrew Lloyd Webber vowed to keep a very tight grip on them and would get the final say on all productions regardless of the production team. This led to a strict level of standardization across the global productions of megamusicals that did not exist in live theatre before. This genre of musical theatre has been derogatorily referred to as "McTheatre", comparatively alluding to the standardization of fast food chain McDonald's products as well as its size and global reach.

A musical need not contain all of these elements to be regarded as a megamusical. Many of these features were established by the influential megamusicals of the 1980s, but the genre has since evolved. As such, consideration has to be given to the musical itself as well as the context surrounding it.

== History ==
Theatre historians and scholars often consider the megamusical genre to be a descendant of 19th century French opera, specifically operetta, because of their similar emphasis on spectacle. The concept musicals of the 1960s and 1970s, which prioritised visual representation over linear storytelling, are also seen as a precursor to this genre.

The megamusical phenomenon began with the 1981 musical Cats, composed by Lloyd Webber and produced by Cameron Mackintosh. Theatre scholar Vagelis Siropoulos explained:

Cats is considered the quintessential megamusical, because it reconceived, like no other show before, theatrical space as an immense affective encompasser, that transforms the viewing experience into a hypercharged thrill-ride and the spectator into an explorer of new and challenging aural and visual sensations. Its unprecedented success paved the way for even bolder hyperspatial configurations, made the set designer a proper environment builder and raised light and sound design into the status of art in their own right. It also paved the way for the constant revolutionization of stage technology.

Musicologist Jessica Sternfeld points out that while Cats was the "first true megamusical", an early form of the genre was first introduced by Jesus Christ Superstar, another musical by Lloyd Webber with lyrics by Tim Rice. Premiering on Broadway in 1971, some of the characteristics found in Jesus Christ Superstar later became key elements of the 1980s megamusical: a completely sung-through score replacing dialogue, expansive and complicated sets, and a melodramatic and larger-than-life plot. Lloyd Webber's 1978 musical Evita also featured these elements, leading Siropoulos to regard it as another early prototype of the genre — "not yet a megamusical in its finished form, like Cats".

The first two major players in the megamusical era were Lloyd Webber and Mackintosh, but soon after, they were joined by major corporations like Disney Theatrical Group, Viacom, PolyGram, and MCA. Disney Theatrical Group came onto the New York theatre scene in the form of megamusicals during the renovation of Times Square. To this day, they are one of the biggest producers of megamusicals on Broadway.

=== 21st century ===
After the September 11 attacks, Broadway ticket sales suffered. Ticket sales eventually started stabilising, driven not by tourists but by the locals. According to musicologist Elizabeth Wollman, New Yorkers sought escapist entertainment in the months and years following the attacks, and megamusicals fit that bill for them. Just a couple of years later came the megamusical Wicked, which featured two female leads and had feminist undertones. Since then, other megamusicals such as Hamilton have incorporated elements of social change. Hamilton is a story about Alexander Hamilton and many other white men, but the cast deliberately featured mostly people of color in the lead roles and ensemble. There has been debate over whether or not Hamilton is a megamusical, but those who say that it is cite its commercial success, its design elements (though it features a simple set, it has grand lighting and stage automation) and the fact that it is completely sung-through.

== Technology ==
The megamusical's continual innovation of stage technology has transformed the live theatre experience. The advent of the genre itself was driven largely by major technological advances and globalisation, with one major turning point being the advancement of audio technology. While radio microphones had been used sparingly as early as the 1964 Broadway staging of Funny Girl, the original 1981 production of Cats was the first known instance where an entire cast was individually outfitted with radio microphones. This departure from shared ambient microphones transformed sound design as it meant that musicals no longer had to depend on the acoustics and architectural design of the theatrical venue, and enabled megamusicals to achieve cinematic levels of sound amplification and studio-quality audio in live theatre. This practice of individually radio miking each performer has since become the norm in live theatre. Special effects technology also plays an integral role in this genre and has allowed for complicated set changes to be fully automated. Production manager Richard Bullimore was at the forefront of realising these technical advances along with companies such as Delstar Engineering, Stage Technologies and Unusual Rigging.

== Notable examples ==
Below is a non-exhaustive list of notable megamusicals.

Name	Year	Composer	Lyricist	Book	Ref
Cats	1981	Andrew Lloyd Webber	T. S. Eliot		
Starlight Express	1984	Andrew Lloyd Webber	Richard Stilgoe		
Les Misérables	1985	Claude-Michel Schönberg	Alain Boublil	Schönberg	
The Phantom of the Opera	1986	Andrew Lloyd Webber	Charles Hart and Richard Stilgoe	Hart and Stilgoe	
Chess	1986	Benny Andersson and Björn Ulvaeus	Tim Rice and Ulvaeus	Rice and Richard Nelson	
Miss Saigon	1989	Claude-Michel Schönberg	Alain Boublil and Richard Maltby Jr.	Boublil and Schönberg	
Beauty and the Beast	1994	Alan Menken	Howard Ashman and Tim Rice	Linda Woolverton	
Sunset Boulevard	1994	Andrew Lloyd Webber	Don Black and Christopher Hampton	Black and Hampton	
The Lion King	1997	Elton John	Tim Rice	Roger Allers & Irene Mecchi	
Wicked	2003	Stephen Schwartz	Schwartz	Winnie Holzman	
The Lord of the Rings	2006	A. R. Rahman, Christopher Nightingale and Värttinä	Matthew Warchus and Shaun McKenna	Warchus and McKenna	
Spider-Man: Turn Off the Dark	2011	Bono and The Edge		Julie Taymor, Glen Berger and Roberto Aguirre-Sacasa	
King Kong	2013	Marius de Vries	Michael Mitnick and Craig Lucas	Lucas	
Hamilton	2015	Lin-Manuel Miranda			

== Image gallery ==
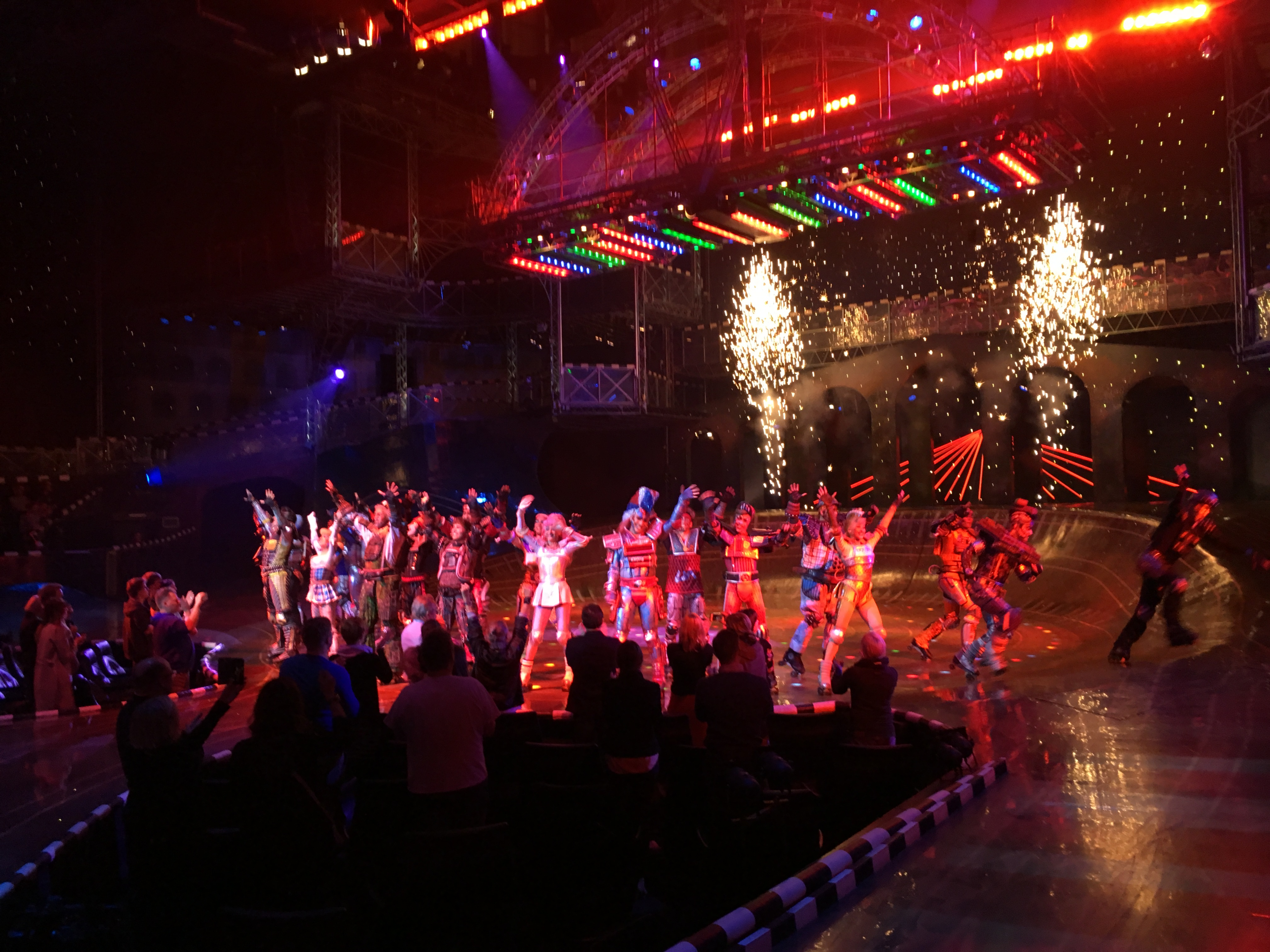
The megamusical Starlight Express features spectacle elements as seen in this photo.

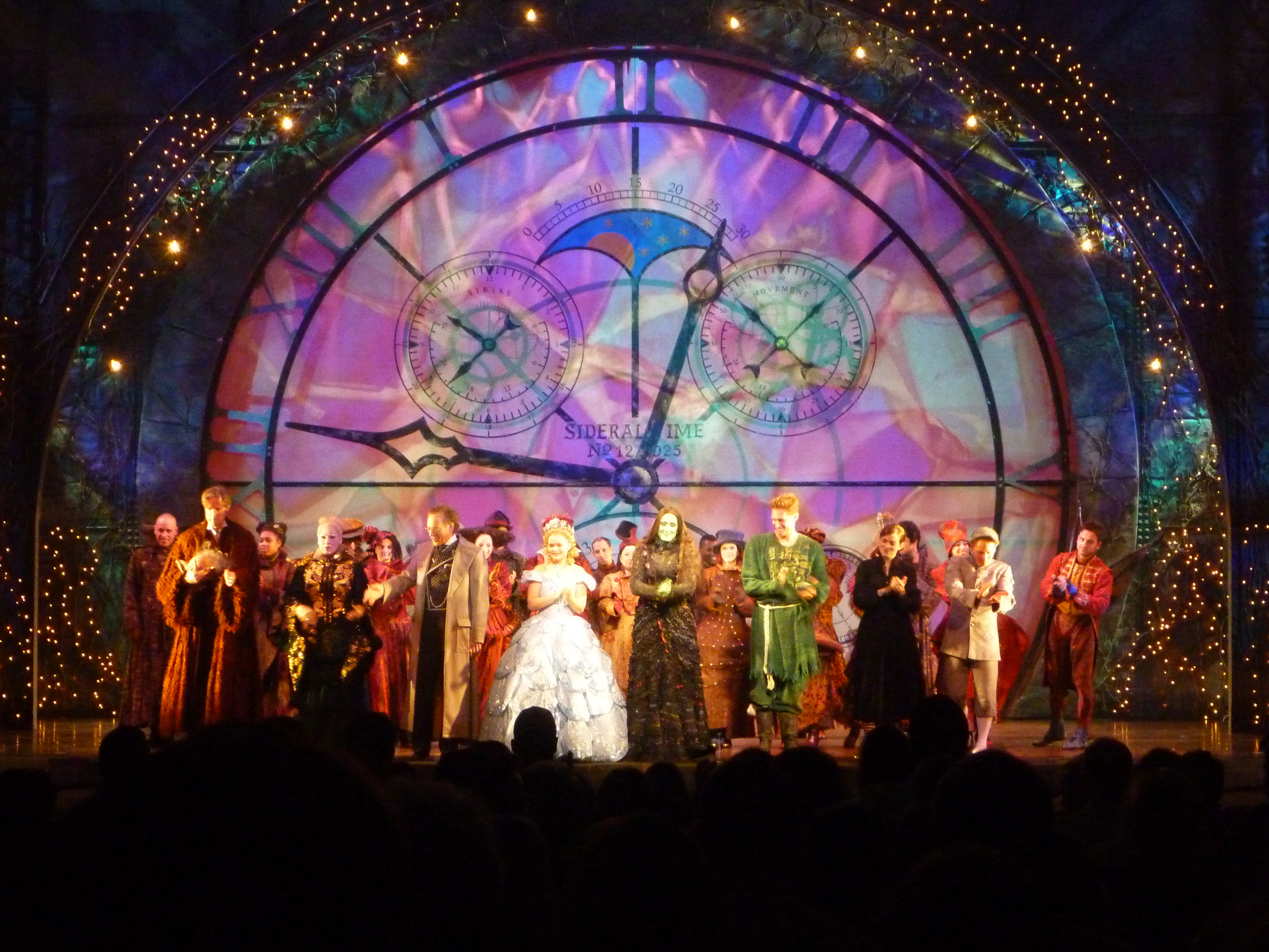
This is a photo from a touring production of Wicked, a megamusical from the early 2000s.

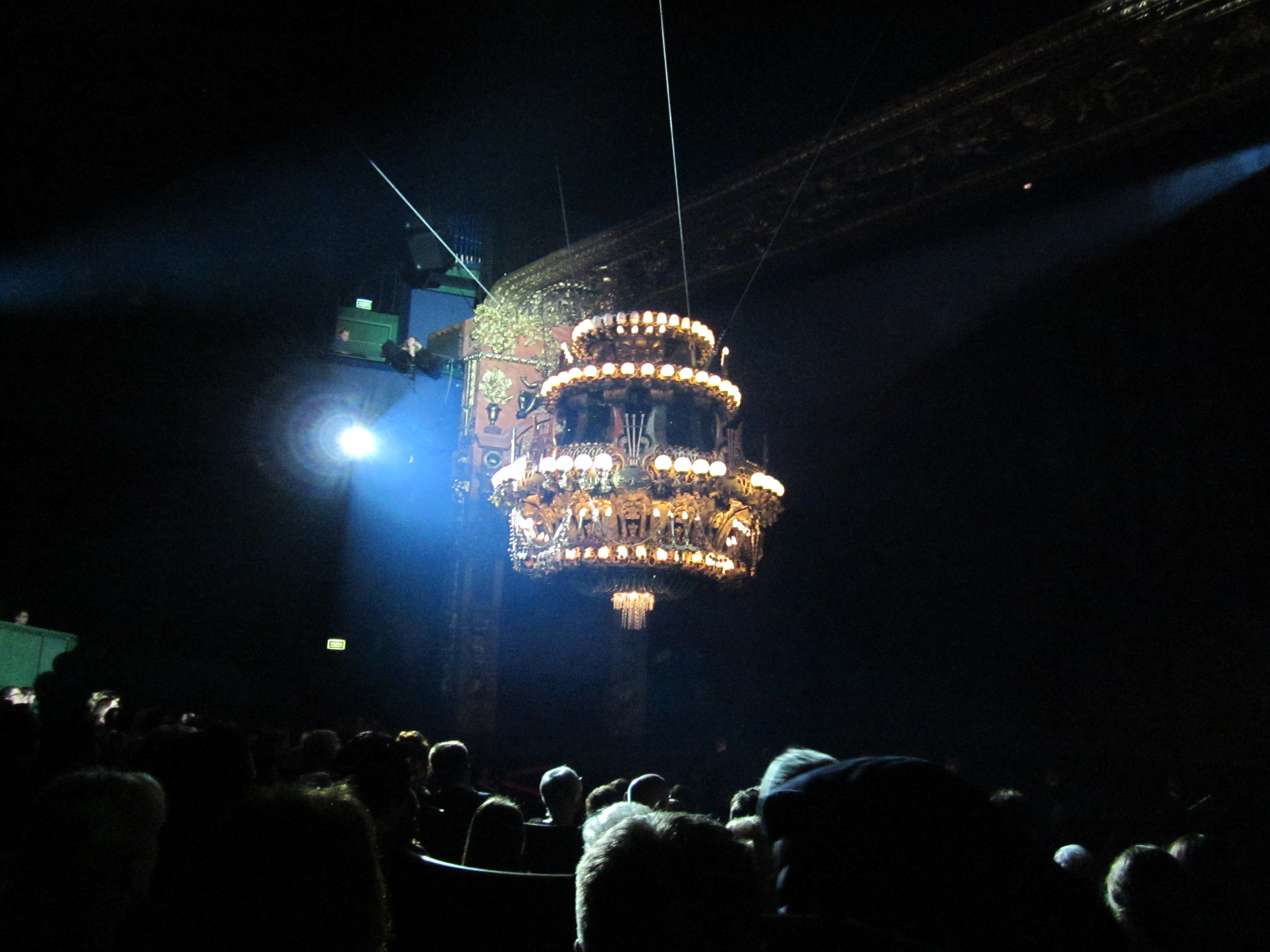
The chandelier in The Phantom of the Opera is featured in a moment of spectacle during the musical.

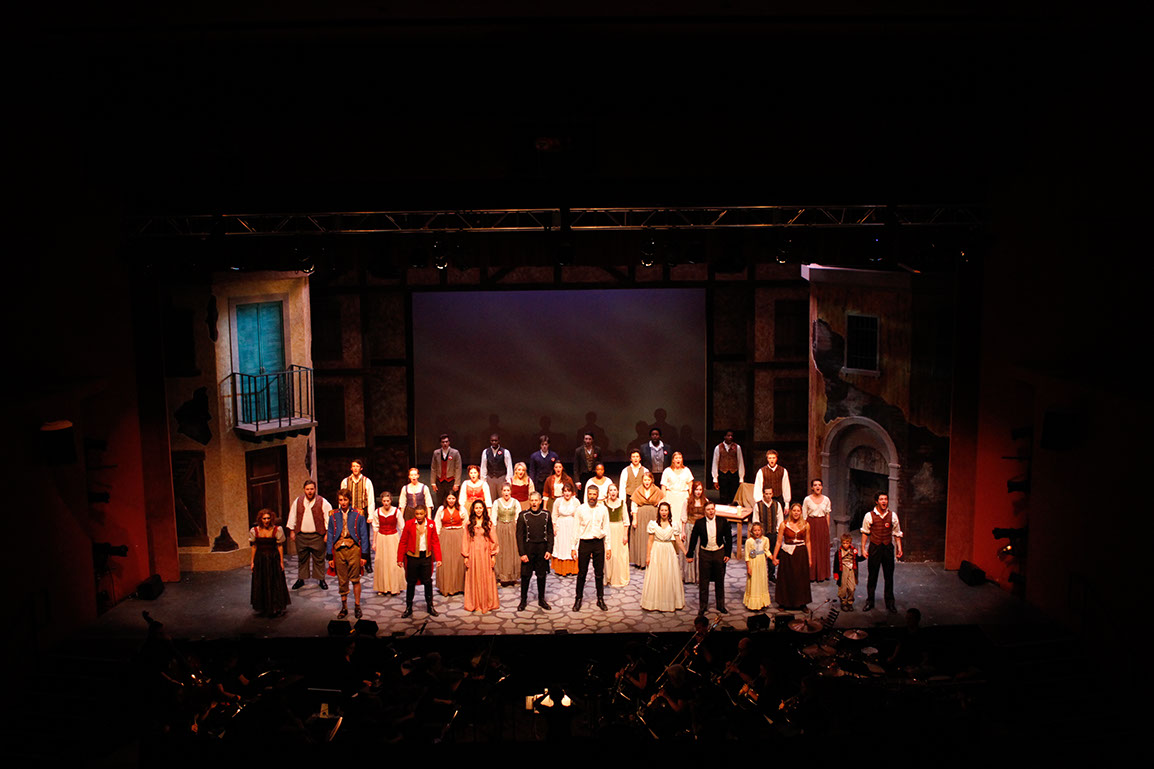
One of the qualities of a megamusical is having a large ensemble cast, as seen in Les Misérables.
