= Concept musical =

Musical theater that embodies a theme

A concept musical is a work of musical theatre with a book and score structured to develop and embody a theme or message, rather than convey a narrative plot.

The form was popularized by Man of La Mancha (1965), Cabaret (1966), and Hair (1967), with Company (1970) paving the way for bolder concept musicals.

The careers of producer-director Harold Prince, composer Stephen Sondheim, and director-choreographer Bob Fosse are all closely associated with the genre.

== Definition ==
The term 'concept musical' was influenced by the 1968 New York Times review of Zorba by critic Martin Gottfried. Referring to Harold Prince's direction rather than the show itself, Gottfried wrote: "Conception is the big word here - it is what is coming to replace the idea of a 'book'... there is even less room than in the usual musical [for story] because Prince's concept... apparently won out on every question about cutting." In his 1971 review of Follies, Gottfried defined the concept musical as "a show whose music, lyrics, dance, stage movement and dialogue are woven through each other in the creation of a tapestry-like theme (rather than in support of a plot)."

Concept musicals place emphasis upon style, message, and thematic metaphor rather than the plot itself, thus the show's structure is rarely cohesive or linear. Chiefly understood by its holistic approach to each show, the concept musical strives for artistic representation of the theme in every aspect of the final production. Distinguishing it from other forms of musical theatre: "In musical comedy there is no theme. The revue uses a theme to unify disparate musical numbers and specialty acts. The integrated musical contains a theme. In contrast, the concept musical embodies a theme [that is] developed as the musical is written."

Concept musicals share structural characteristics and common staging techniques: songs "punctuate rather than flow out from the story," serving as a means of self-reflection for the character and acting as commentary upon the theme. The message of the show often spurs within its director a "renewed emphasis on the visual aspects of the performance... [leading] to a more abstract, unrealistic, non-representational staging, as the director has to free himself/herself from the confines of scenic verisimilitude in order to explore the visual dynamics of the stage." The attention paid to visual presentation marks the concept musical as the most expressive and imagistic form of musical theatre. Theatre historian Vagelis Siropoulos notes "a sense of aesthetic totality is provided not by the linear unfolding of a narrative but by the overarching staging concept, which turns the spectator's attention to the overall principle of organization in the same way that an abstract painting does."

== Origins ==
The concept musical's non-linear structure and focus on theme are suggestive of the works of Bertolt Brecht. A similar connection can be made to the Living Newspapers of the 1930s. The 1941 Broadway production of Lady in the Dark by Kurt Weill, Ira Gershwin, and Moss Hart offered early signs of the genre: attention to characters and their psychological makeup, rather than the plot and its through-line, foreshadow the concept musical's priority of personal expression. Weill would favor ideas over linear narrative throughout the course of his career.

== Predecessors ==
Conventions of the post-World War II musical were probed in Allegro (1947) by Rodgers and Hammerstein, as well as Love Life (1948) by Weill and Alan Jay Lerner.

Allegro, which concerns a son following in his father's footsteps, represents a "musical experiment" conducted by Rodgers and Hammerstein. Defying "virtually all musical theatre conventions" of the time, its Greek chorus frequently interrupts the narrative, and the show focuses on a larger theme of personal struggle in the face of success. Minimalist in its staging, patterns of light were used to represent both spaces and emotions, while each character was given a single solo, with no character standing out. Though Allegro maintains a linear nature and the plot continues regardless of the choral interludes, the particular story is arguably ceded to the concept that success corrupts. The show was a critical failure, which many theatre historians blame on the inexperience of director-choreographer Agnes de Mille. Disheartened, Rodgers and Hammerstein returned to a more traditional format. Yet Allegro "opened the door to a splendid new way of writing for musical theatre." The show planted an early seed of the concept musical with Stephen Sondheim, who was mentored by Hammerstein and worked as a production assistant on Allegro.

Love Life, the story of a marriage lasting over a century, "disregarded the traditional use of time, interrupted its action with jolting vaudeville numbers that commented on the story, and... tried to illustrate sociological ideas by paralleling them to a long-term personal relationship." Freed from his usual partnership with Loewe, Lerner's growing experimentation with the genre is represented in Love Life. Like Allegro, the narrative is not explicitly linear, exploring the theme of marriage through a variety of lenses. Sondheim has stated that Love Life was a "useful influence" on his own work, "but it failed because it started out with an idea rather than a character."

== Development ==
The concept musical blooms from the growing concern for the cohesiveness of a particular production: unlike composers "who simply found a good story and musicalized it, now it was considered appropriate (and artistically more satisfying) to have a vision of the whole show." Leonard Bernstein was a key figure in this movement, with his 1956 shows Candide and West Side Story representing a "radical experiment in book writing" dominated by theme and metaphor. The growing maturation of musical theatre allowed the genre to become "a vehicle for social commentary and experimentation in form," including fragmented storytelling approaches in The Fantasticks (1960) and Stop the World – I Want to Get Off (1961), with the concept musical emerging at the forefront of this movement.

=== 1960s ===
Man of La Mancha premiered at the Goodspeed Opera House in 1965, eventually transferring to Broadway. The "antithesis of what people expected musicals to be," the show was nonetheless popular, and marked a growing undercurrent of rebellion against the traditional musical theatre model.

Cabaret opened on Broadway in 1966, directed by Harold Prince, "considered the primary director" of the genre. The show features songs that comment on the action within the narrative frame of the musical's Kit Kat Klub setting. Removed from the story, these songs serve as commentary in the style of Brecht and Weill's The Threepenny Opera.

Hair, an early rock musical, opened Off-Broadway at The Public Theater in 1967, then on Broadway the following year. Dramatizing a communal 1960s "happening," the show effectively "provided 'safe' exposure to the counterculture for middle-class audiences."

=== 1970s ===
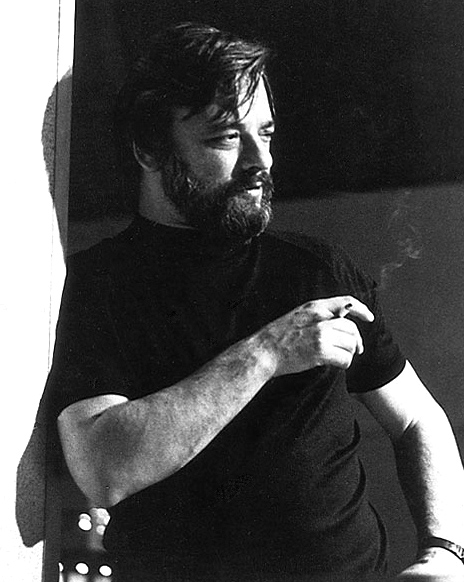
Stephen Sondheim authored numerous concept musicals, beginning with Company.

"The concept musical truly arrived with Company, a musical that managed to be palatable to audiences even as it broke just about every rule of musical comedy." The 1970 show, with music and lyrics by Sondheim and a book by George Furth, centers on Bobby, a single man living in New York City on the eve of his thirty-fifth birthday. It examines his romantic and personal relationships with several girlfriends and a variety of his married friends. The critical success of Company paved the way for Sondheim to continue innovating with the genre, believing every show should contain "a secret metaphor that nobody knows except the authors." Like Prince, Sondheim had "instincts in [his] approach... that echo Brecht and Weill". Sondheim's themes and issues are intended to confront the audience rather than provide them with a means of escape. Sondheim's writing adheres to the principle that "content dictates form," an approach well suited to the concept musical.

Follies opened in 1971 at the Winter Garden Theatre, winning the Tony Award for Best Music and Lyrics and the New York Drama Critics' Circle award for Best Musical. Directed by Prince and Bennett, with choreography by Bennett, Follies can be taken for a commentary on America under the Nixon presidency. In true Sondheim fashion, content defines its form: parallelisms of the young characters, mirrored against their older selves, create multiple structural permutations and confrontations, breaking down a linear sense of narrative. Set against a backdrop of aging glamour and the roads not taken, the show "belies Sondheim's preoccupation with choice and its consequences, or rather subverts it into an understanding that making a mess of choices or being unable to choose at all is a constant."

After directing the film version of Cabaret, director-choreographer Bob Fosse helped shape the 1972 Broadway musical Pippin, written by Stephen Schwartz and Roger Hirson. Fosse's conceptual vision for Chicago, which opened on Broadway in 1975, featured vaudeville routines that "comment on the system of justice and imprisonment in Chicago in the 1920s... Kander and Ebb and Fosse and Prince were advancing upon the convention by which characters have two modes of existence in musicals. They were taking the convention literally, putting show business settings next to 'real' settings... and letting the two overlap."

The phrase "conceived by" preceded Michael Bennett's billing in A Chorus Line. Often cited as the quintessential concept musical, the popularity of the 1975 New York Shakespeare Festival/Public Theater production and its subsequent Broadway transfer kicked the growing concept musical phenomenon into high gear. Based on interviews with actual dancers, the show uses the premise of an audition to expose the complex lives of previously-faceless chorus members.

Pacific Overtures, among the more obscure Sondheim scores, delineates a theme of naïve illusion maturing to acceptance. The show, directed by Prince, opened at the Winter Garden Theatre in 1976, winning the Drama Critics Circle award for Best Musical. Sondheim explained his writing process for the show: "What we actually did was to create a mythical Japanese playwright in our heads, who has come to New York, seen a couple of Broadway shows, and then goes back home and writes a musical about Commodore Perry's visit to Japan. It's this premise that helped to give us tone and style for the show." The show mixes traditional forms of kabuki and vaudeville to present a unique viewpoint. Sondheim's Sweeney Todd (1979) pushed the genre's boundaries into horror.

=== 1980s and beyond ===
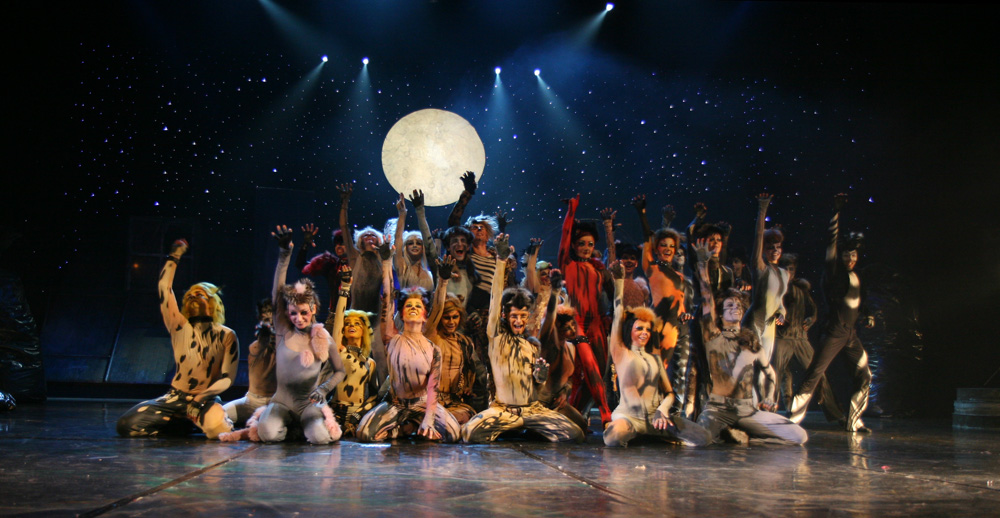
Cats cast, Roma Musical Theatre in Warsaw.

Sondheim's 1981 flop Merrily We Roll Along follows a trio of friends backwards from retirement to young adulthood, while his Sunday in the Park with George (1983) is inspired by a neo-impressionist painting.

Experimental and expressive concept musicals were a precursor to the megamusical genre, which prioritized spectacle and stage technology to "radicalize the imagistic potential of musical theatre." First staged in 1981, Cats "heralded the dawning of a new postmodern musical era, encapsulating the major difference between the concept musical and the megamusical." Though the show is based on a concept rather than a linear plot, author Andrew Lloyd Webber intended to create a show that was not meant to "reflect [or] comment on the world, even in an oblique, metaphorical way." This was a drastic difference from the metaphors that defined the concept musical.

Starlight Express, an "experiment" by Lloyd Webber staged on the West End in 1984 and on Broadway in 1987, used the conceit of trains being portrayed by a cast on roller skates without concern for a linear plot. The original concept was to be an "entertainment 'event' for children who love trains." Lloyd Webber has been quoted as saying that the result was "not quite what we intended," given that the "joy and sense of pure fun that was the original intention seemed to get lost."

Sondheim's Assassins, directed by Jerry Zaks, opened Off-Broadway at Playwrights Horizons in 1991, with neither protagonist nor linear plot. The show shifts back and forth chronologically, exploring the motives and efforts of the successful and would-be assassins of various United States presidents. Its number of short scenes, many of which are crude and slapstick, echo the structure of Company.

Creators of Avenue Q (2003) aimed to create something that "didn't move like a story," but was not a true revue, "using kind of Internet logic, a hyperlink type of logic to go from one subject to another." Utilizing a series of vignettes and isolated situations to comment on the central idea, the circular structure follows the central character's coming-of-age search for his purpose. None of the scenes "bring him closer to discovering his purpose, indicating that the events of the musical will continue after the section shared with the audience is completed."

== Criticism ==
Much has been written about the importance and impact of the concept musical. Drama theorist and critic Kathryn Edney believes that the concept musical "is rarely popular or particularly profitable, although it often garners critical praise, scholarly attention, and a cult following among the musical theater cognoscenti." She postulates that the discrepancies between the concept musical and megamusical are a direct result of the efforts of Sondheim and Lloyd Webber, whose "competing musical and personal styles... polarized fans of this genre. One is not supposed to enjoy both Cats and Company." Likewise considering the relationship between the concept musical and megamusical, Siropoulos finds that the concept musical "is the product of a culture permeated by spectacle... The concept musical's disproportional concentration on the visual aspects of performance goes hand in hand with representational ends, an obligation to represent, however obliquely, the external world."

Siropoulos also argues that Prince, over any of his peers, is the true link between the concept musical and megamusical. Prince's work on Company and Evita, in particular, showcase his abilities in directing two distinct styles.

Like the megamusical, [Company] undermines the narrative organization of the musical and foregrounds the visual aspects of the performance. For the staging of Evita, Prince employed and further developed the directorial vocabulary he cultivated in his concept musicals, creating, in the process, the first international megamusical blockbuster. In a sense, Prince can be considered the father of both the concept musical and the megamusical, linking, in this way, two forms of musical theatre: one of the most critically acclaimed with the one that has generally been considered as an anomaly and aberration in the history of the twentieth-century musical theatre.

— Vagelis Siropoulos, Evita, the Society of the Spectacle and the Advent of the Megamusical

Dramaturg Scott McMillin argues that the concept musical built upon the theories of Rodgers and Hammerstein to bring the genre into the modern era, allowing the musical to become "arguably the major form of drama produced so far in America."

The age of the concept musical carried this advance in book-and-number formatting to the point that there is virtually nothing that cannot be imagined an effective topic for a musical. The ferment of ideas behind the concept show combines innovation with a strict sense of the musical’s history (the revue as called to life in Follies), the musical’s procedures (the audition and rehearsals of A Chorus Line), and the musical’s relationships to other forms of theatre (the kabuki methods in Pacific Overtures). The past and the future of the theatre are at issue in the best of them.

— Scott McMillin, The Musical as Drama

Theatre historian John Bush Jones argues that the concept musical undermines the role of the traditional musical as a narrative medium, proposing that the term 'concept musical' is "too broad to be of much value," suggesting instead the term 'fragmented musical'.
