= James Loye =

British actor (born 1979)

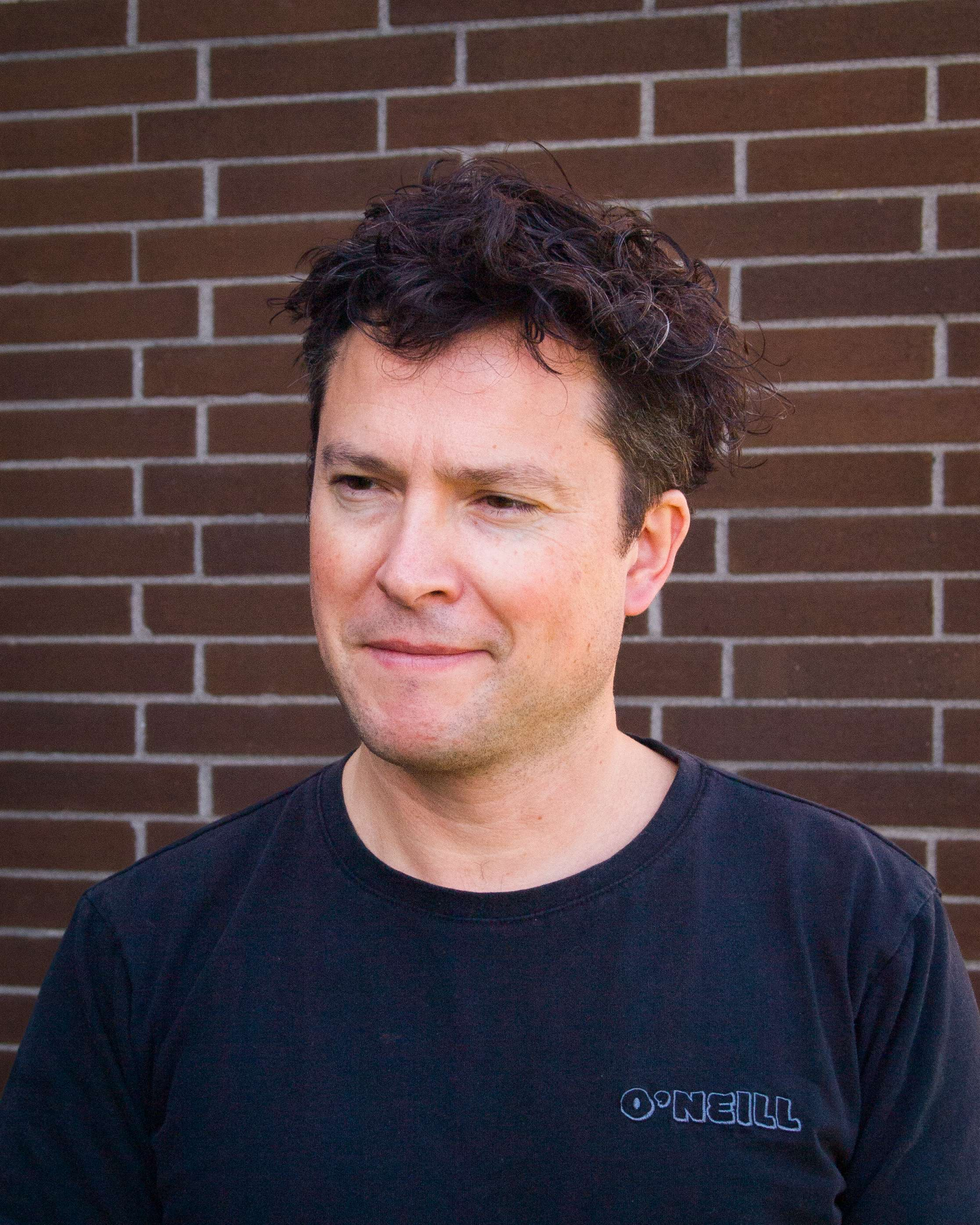
James Loye 2024

James Loye (born 23 May 1979, Bristol, United Kingdom) is a British actor. He originated the part of Frodo Baggins in the Toronto and London production (Theatre Royal Drury Lane) of Lord of the Rings the Musical. He trained at The Royal Welsh College of Music and Drama. His theatre credits include Cymbeline and Twelfth Night at Regents Park Open Air Theatre for which he was nominated for the Ian Charlson award. He played Prince Charming in Rufus Norris' Sleeping Beauty at The Barbican, Young Vic and New Victory Theatre New York. His other credits include work at The Bristol Old Vic, Chichester Festival Theatre, Birmingham Rep, Salisbury Playhouse and The Sheffield Crucible.

He now lives in Montreal, Canada where he continues to work in theatre, television, film and the video games. Theatre includes Butcher, Robin Hood, Centaur Theatre, The Sound of Music, NAC. His television credits includes The Art of More (Season 1), Being Human, Ascension and Mohawk Girls. Film credits include X-Men Apocalypse and Francois Girard's film Hochelaga Land of Souls (release 2017). He has appeared in Assassin's Creed Video games for Ubisoft and Eidos' Deus Ex.

For UK television, he has played Lieutenant David Mellis in the award-winning BBC series Dunkirk, and his radio credits include The White Guard, Who Shot Shelly?, Molière Imaginaire and King Lear.
