= Bill Richardson (footballer, born 1943) =

English footballer

Personal information
- Full name: William Richardson
- Date of birth: 25 October 1943 (age 83)
- Place of birth: Bedlington, Northumberland, England
- Height: 5 ft 8 in (1.73 m)
- Position: Defender

Youth career
- –1960: Sunderland

Senior career*
Years	Team	Apps	(Gls)
1960–1965	Sunderland	0	(0)
1965–1968	Mansfield Town	63	(0)
1968–1969	York City	24	(0)
1969–	South Shields		
Total		87	(0)
- * Club domestic league appearances and goals

William Richardson (born 25 October 1943) is an English former professional footballer who played as a winger in the Football League for Mansfield Town and York City, in non-League football for South Shields and was on the books of Sunderland without making a league appearance.
