= Dick Lee (footballer, born 1944) =

English footballer

Personal information
- Full name: Richard Lee
- Date of birth: 11 September 1944 (age 82)
- Place of birth: Sheffield, England
- Position: Defender

Senior career*
Years	Team	Apps	(Gls)
1963–1964	Rotherham United	0	(0)
1964–1965	Notts County	0	(0)
1965–1966	Mansfield Town	4	(1)
1966–1968	Halifax Town	14	(0)
1968–1975	Buxton		
1975	Mossley		
Total		18	(1)
- * Club domestic league appearances and goals

Richard Lee (born 11 September 1944) is an English former professional footballer who played in the Football League for Halifax Town and Mansfield Town.
