= Peter Carr (public servant) =

British public servant

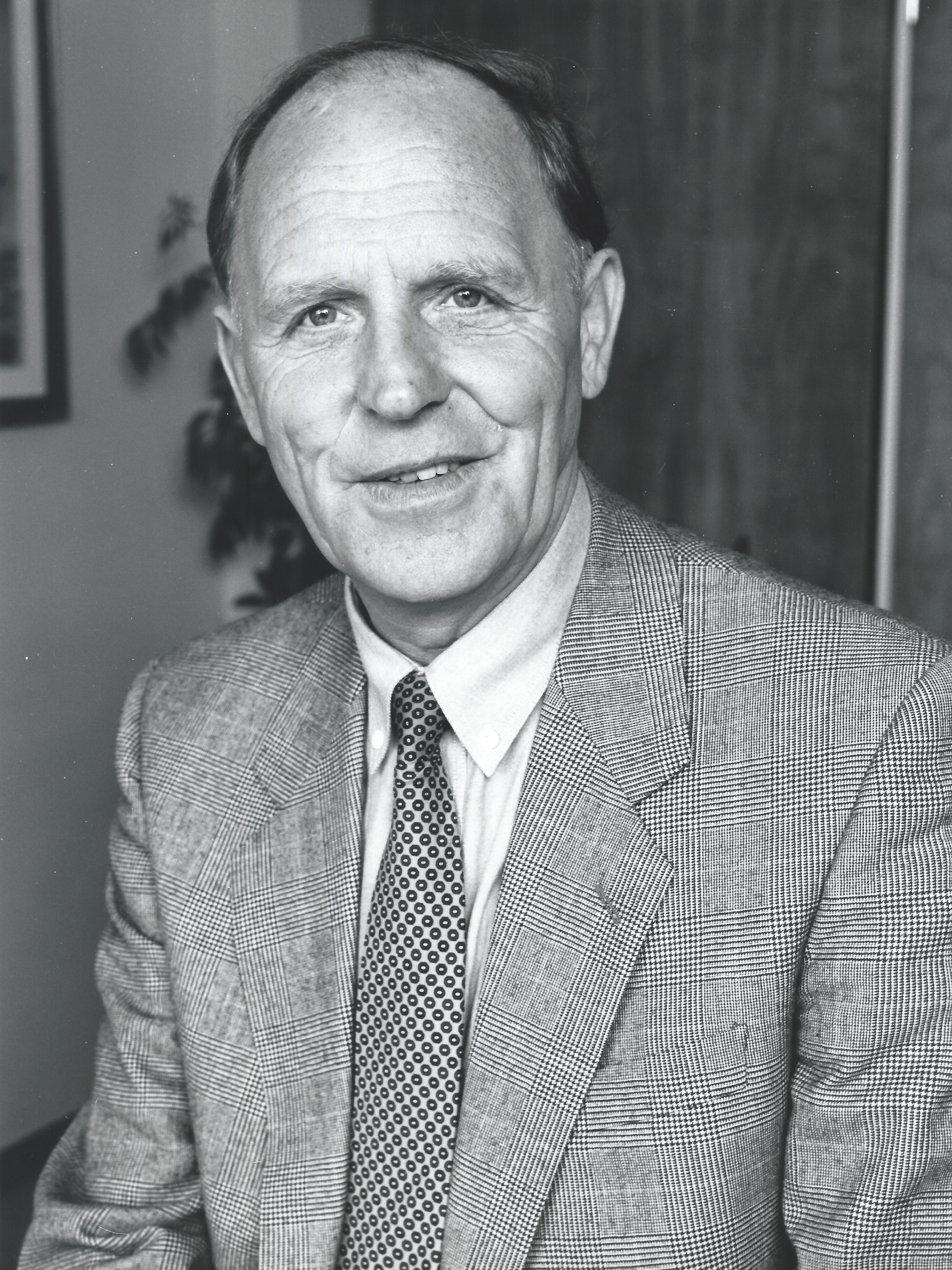
Sir Peter Carr, UK Public Servant and National Health Service Chairman, 1930-2017. Photograph taken in 1994.

Sir Peter Derek Carr CBE (12 July 1930 – 21 October 2017) was a British public servant who had a career in industrial relations, the UK diplomatic service and in National Health Service (NHS) management. He was a founding director of the government's Commission on Industrial Relations and the industrial relations body ACAS. He was chairman of the North East Strategic Health Authority and its precursors, the NHS Trust Development Authority and vice-chair of NHS Improvement (now NHS England). He was made a knight bachelor in 2007 for his service to the NHS and to public life.

- Industrial relations advisor, H.M. Government, National Board for Prices and Incomes, 1967–1969
- Director, Commission on Industrial Relations, 1969–1974
- Director, Advisory Conciliation and Arbitration Service (ACAS), 1974–1978
- Labour Attaché/Counsellor, British Embassy, Washington DC, USA, 1978–1983
- Director, Department of Employment and North East City Action Team, 1983–1989
- Chairman, County Durham Development Corporation, 1990–2001
- Chairman & Co-Founder, Northern Screen Commission, 1992-2002
- Chairman, Occupational Pensions Board, 1993–1997
- Chairman, NHS (National Health Service) North East Strategic Health Authority (and precursors), 2002–2011
- Chairman, NHS (National Health Service) Trust Development Authority (now NHS England), 2012–2016
- Vice chair, NHS (National Health Service) Improvement (now NHS England), 2016–2017

== Early life ==
Peter Carr was born in 1930 in the South Yorkshire mining town of Mexborough, England, the son of George Carr, a print worker, and his wife, Marjorie (née Tailby). After leaving school without qualifications aged thirteen, he completed an apprenticeship as a joiner at General Electric Company and did National Service in the Royal Air Force Mountain Rescue Service. He worked on building sites and for cabinet making firms for fifteen years until his mid twenties but during this period began to read widely, especially the Fabian philosopher Bertrand Russell and the social historian GDH Cole and he ran courses for the Workers' Educational Association. In 1956 he left home to study at Fircroft College in Birmingham, an adult education college founded by the Cadbury family, where he met his wife, Geraldine, who was working at the Cadbury’s chocolate factory in the city. The following year, his trade union, the Amalgamated Society of Woodworkers (now part of the UCATT union), sponsored him to study economics and politics at Ruskin College in Oxford. Whilst at Ruskin, he edited its New Epoch magazine and was adopted by the ‘Oxford School’ of industrial relations academics, which included his friend and fellow Yorkshireman, the labour economist Professor Derek Robinson as well as Allan Flanders and Hugh Clegg at Nuffield College.

After Oxford, Carr then qualified as a college lecturer at Garnett College in London and went on to lecture on collective bargaining in courses for trade unionists at Percival Whitley Adult Education College in Halifax in West Yorkshire. He was active in the Labour Party whilst in Halifax and ran the election campaign that got Shirley Summerskill elected as a member of the UK Parliament. He then moved south to Thurrock Technical College (now South Essex College) in Essex, where he pioneered education on collective bargaining for dockyard, chemical industry and paper workers. During this time, he organised many exchange trips between UK trade unionists in the UK and those in Sweden and France. Through his teaching to trade unionists, he became an advisor to the government’s National Board for Prices and Incomes as an expert witness on wage bargaining in industry.

== Industrial relations ==
In 1969 Carr was recruited into the UK Civil Service, as a founding director of the newly formed Commission on Industrial Relations (CIR), a body created by Barbara Castle’s ‘In Place of Strife’ legislation to improve employer-worker relations and Lord Donovan's Royal Commission report. He worked to solve high-profile industrial disputes, such as at the Con Mech engineering company, which had recruited mushroom farmers from Sicily to replace unionised workers in its factory in Woking. However, the incoming Conservative government of 1970 ignored Carr’s recommendations on union recognition and, under the powers of the notorious Industrial Relations Act 1971, the engineering union’s assets were sequestrated, prompting a series of national strikes. The incoming Labour Government of 1974 repealed the acrimonious 1971 Act, replacing it with a more conciliatory approach to Industrial Relations.

In 1975 Carr went on to work as a founding director of the industrial arbitration body, the Advisory Conciliation and Arbitration Service (ACAS), working on industrial relations in many sectors, including on the troubled print industry being reviewed by the Royal Commission on the Press. At ACAS he wrote new policy guidance on employer disclosure of information, the right to take time off for trade union duties and a review of trade union collective bargaining in Europe.

In 1978 Carr was asked to join the diplomatic service at the British embassy in Washington, D.C., United States, to be its labour attaché, working to Ambassador Peter Jay who he had known at Oxford. His role at the embassy was to encourage union and employer exchanges between Britain and the US. During this period, he got to know many prominent trade union figures, such as George Meany, president of the AFL-CIO, A. Philip Randolph, the African-American founder of the Brotherhood of Pullman Sleeping Car Porters, Cezar Chavez of the farm workers union and other US figures, including President Jimmy Carter. The US Labor and Employment Relations Association (LERA) latterly awarded Peter Carr its Lifetime Achievement Award for his work in fostering Anglo-US learning on industrial relations.

== North East England ==
On return to Britain in 1983, Carr took up directorship roles at the Department of Employment in Sheffield and then at the North East City Action Team in Newcastle and was closely involved in attracting Nissan and other overseas investors to the region. In this development role, he created the Northern Screen Commission (North East Screen) to promote the region as a film location, working closely the British film-maker Stewart MacKinnon. One notable success was that the Harry Potter films were partly shot at Durham Cathedral and Alnwick Castle. He also promoted tourism in the North East and brought together all the local authorities along Hadrian’s Wall to agree to jointly on upkeep, promotion and job creation along the wall. The Hadrian's Wall Path is the result.

After retirement from the Civil Service in 1993, Carr went on to chair various public bodies in the UK, including the Occupational Pensions Board, where he introduced major reforms in response to the Robert Maxwell pensions scandal, and locally in the North East he chaired the County Durham Development Company.

== National Health Service ==
From 1998 Carr had senior roles in the National Health Service, where he chaired the regional strategic health authorities for the North East of England, eventually bringing them together as chair of the Newcastle and North Tyneside Health Authority, the Northumberland, Tyne and Wear Strategic Health Authority and subsequently the North East Strategic Health Authority. As regional lead for the NHS, Carr’s legacy for health in the North East includes a cardiac unit in Teesside, a cataract surgery unit in Sunderland, the building of the Royal Victoria Infirmary in Newcastle and the first smoking cessation programme in the health service.

As chair of the national NHS Trust Development Authority and then vice-chair of NHS Improvement (now NHS England), and as a member of the national governing board of the NHS, Carr advocated that new modern management and learning methods be adopted in the NHS. He promoted the Japanese ‘Kaizen’ management philosophy of continuous improvement, and promoted a principle of ‘no unnecessary deaths’ be adopted. He had strong views on the dangers of politicians trying to micro-manage the health services saying that “Parliament and Ministers are legislators, not managers.”

As a board member of Newcastle University, Carr worked closely with Sir Liam Donaldson, the former Chief Medical Officer, including on a ground-breaking programme of research to promote NHS management and constant improvement in the health service.

In 2017 the National Health Service established the Sir Peter Carr Award, in recognition of health staff who promote innovation and good management, an award initiated by Sir Jim Mackey, now heading NHS England, with whom Carr had worked in the North East.

== Awards ==
Peter Carr was made a Commander of the British Empire (CBE) in 1989 and was knighted (knight bachelor) in 2007 for services to the NHS. He was awarded honorary doctorates from Sunderland University, Teesside University, a visiting professorship at Durham University and was an honorary fellow and a board member at Newcastle University, as well as being made deputy lieutenant of the County of Durham.

== Personal life ==
Carr was also a keen photographer and furniture maker and was an avid cyclist.

== Death ==
Sir Peter Carr died from complications of Parkinson’s disease on October 21, 2017, aged 87, leaving his widow, Lady Geraldine Carr, daughter Alyce, son Steve and grandchildren Nelson, Warren, Elizabeth and Oscar.
