= Paul Aldread =

English footballer

Personal information
- Full name: Paul Aldread
- Date of birth: 6 November 1946
- Place of birth: Mansfield, England
- Date of death: 2014 (aged 67–68)
- Position: Forward

Senior career*
Years	Team	Apps	(Gls)
1965–1967	Mansfield Town	12	(3)
1967	Corby Town		
1968	Sutton Town		
Total		12	(3)
- * Club domestic league appearances and goals

Paul Aldread (6 November 1946 – 2014) was an English professional footballer who played in the Football League for Mansfield Town.
