= Peter Kerr (footballer, born 1954) =

Australian rules footballer

Personal information
- Full name: Peter Kerr
- Born: 26 March 1954 (age 72)
- Original team: Newport
- Height: 180 cm (5 ft 11 in)
- Weight: 83 kg (183 lb)

Playing career^{1}
Years	Club	Games (Goals)
1972	South Melbourne	1 (0)
- ^{1} Playing statistics correct to the end of 1972.

Peter Kerr (born 26 March 1954) is a former Australian rules footballer who played with South Melbourne in the Victorian Football League (VFL).
