= Kevin Wallace (theatre producer) =

Irish theatre producer

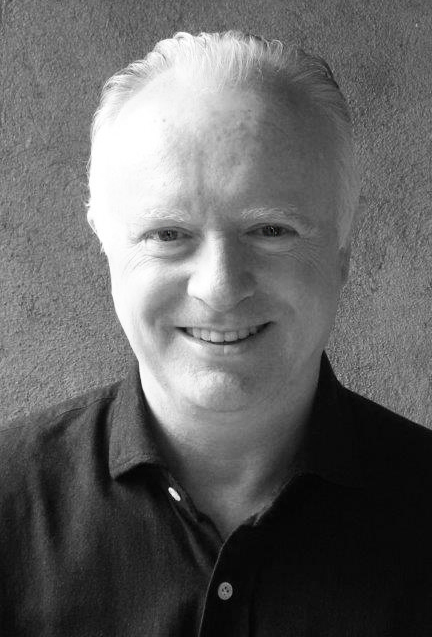

Background information
- Born: Kevin Gerard Wallace; Limerick, Ireland
- Occupation: Theatrical producer
- Years active: 1990–present
- Website: http://kevinwallace.co.uk

Kevin Gerard Wallace is an Irish theatre producer.

== Early life and education ==
Kevin Gerard Wallace was born in Limerick, Ireland, the youngest of the three children of Michael Kevin Wallace and Nancy (née Cussen).

== Career ==
Wallace worked as a stage and television actor in his native Ireland and in Britain, with the Abbey Theatre, the Royal Shakespeare Company (RSC), Bristol Old Vic, The Liverpool Everyman, Oxford Playhouse, Yorkshire Television and the BBC.

Before joining The Really Useful Group, Wallace produced The Emperor Jones (Offstage Downstairs), Our Town (Shaftesbury Theatre) starring Alan Alda and Robert Sean Leonard with Jonny Lee Miller in his first West End role, and Tim Luscombe's Eurovision starring Anita Dobson and James Dreyfus In January 2002 he re-established Kevin Wallace Limited (KWL), to produce musicals and plays. During 2002, KWL presented the multi-award winning Traverse Theatre/National Theatre production of Gregory Burke's Gagarin Way (Arts Theatre), directed by John Tiffany and the Abbey Theatre Dublin production of Eden by Eugene O'Brien (also at the Arts) Directed by Conor McPherson, Eden won both the Irish Times/ESB Award and the Stewart Parker Award for Best New Play.

Wallace is a Fellow of Rose Bruford College and a Full Member of the Society of London Theatre.

=== Really Useful Group ===
Wallace was an in-house producer with Andrew Lloyd Webber's Really Useful Group (RUG) for eight years, where he was responsible for Celebration, Andrew Lloyd Webber's 50th Birthday Concert at the Royal Albert Hall starring Glenn Close, Antonio Banderas, Sarah Brightman and Elaine Paige; Whistle Down the Wind (Aldwych Theatre), which featured "No Matter What", the hit single recorded by Boyzone; The Beautiful Game (Cambridge Theatre), winner, Best Musical, in the Critics' Circle Theatre Awards 2000 and Closer to Heaven (Arts Theatre), with music and lyrics by the Pet Shop Boys and starring Frances Barber.

He also established productions of The Phantom of the Opera in Switzerland, Belgium, Mexico and Denmark; a US tour of Cats; the original production of Sunset Boulevard, directed by Trevor Nunn, in Germany, and produced the new production of Sunset Boulevard, directed by Robert Carsen and starring Faith Brown.

Wallace produced the UK tour of Jesus Christ Superstar, directed by Gale Edwards, and was executive producer of the film based on that production in 2001. Wallace also produced the Broadway production of Jesus Christ Superstar, (Foxwoods Theatre), directed by Edwards, that received a 2000 Tony Award Nomination for Best Musical Revival.

=== The Lord of the Rings original stage production ===
Wallace, with Saul Zaentz, produced The Lord of the Rings directed by Matthew Warchus, with music by Indian music composer A. R. Rahman, Värttinä and Christopher Nightingale. The Lord of the Rings played in Toronto (Princess of Wales Theatre), where the show was nominated for 15 Dora Awards, winning 7, including "Outstanding New Musical" and awards for direction (Matthew Warchus), costume design (Rob Howell) and choreography (Peter Darling) and in London (Theatre Royal, Drury Lane), where it was nominated for seven Whatsonstage Theatregoer's Choice Awards in 2007 and five Olivier Awards in 2008.

=== The Lord of the Rings: A Musical Tale ===
In 2023, Wallace developed The Lord of the Rings - A Musical Tale, produced by the Watermill Theatre in association with Kevin Wallace for KWL and Middle-earth Enterprises. It was directed by Paul Hart (the venue's artistic director). The production was nominated for 10 BroadwayWorld.Com UK Awards 2023 winning 8 including Best Production, and was also nominated for 4 WhatsOnStage Awards 2024, winning Best Regional Production. The US premiere of The Lord of the Rings - A Musical Tale, again directed by Hart, opened at Chicago Shakespeare Theater on 26 July 2024. It was announced on 9 July 2024, that the Chicago production would play the Civic Theatre, Auckland, New Zealand, with performances from 5 November 2024.

With an all-Australian cast, The Lord of the Rings - A Musical Tale opened at the State Theatre, Sydney on 11 January 2025.

=== Other productions ===
In 2009, Wallace produced the Christmas season of Stuart Wood's music hall musical, Frank's Closet, starring Russell Whitehead and Gary Amers, at the Hoxton Hall in London's East End.

In 2012, Wallace was a co-producer on the musical, Loserville, by Elliot Davis and James Bourne, at the Quarry Theatre, West Yorkshire Playhouse, in Leeds. Loserville transferred from West Yorkshire Playhouse to The Garrick Theatre in London's West End in October 2012, and received a Best New Musical 2013 Olivier Awards nomination.

Wallace was consultant producer to the Australian-based company, Global Creatures, on their stage adaptation King Kong, directed by Daniel Kramer, which had its world premiere at the Regent Theatre, Melbourne on 15 June 2013.

In 2016, Wallace and his Brazilian partners in Tempo Entertainment, premiered a musical based on "Gabriela Clove and Cinnamon" by "Jorge Amado", opening at TEATRO CETIP, São Paulo. Gabriela, adapted for the stage by Adriana Falcão and João Falcão, and directed by João Falcão, won three Bibi Ferreira Awards; Best Brazilian Musical, Best Lighting and Best Direction, and an APCA Cultural Award for Best Director.

In 2017, Wallace co-produced I Capture the Castle, a musical based on the Dodie Smith novel, with Book & Lyrics by Teresa Howard and Music by Steven Edis, at Watford Palace Theatre.

Wallace was creative and consultant producer on the Seven Ages production of Cinderella directed by Joe Graves and designed by Ti Green that opened at Shanghai Cultural Square Theatre in May 2018 and toured throughout China until September 2019.

== Honours and awards ==
Wallace is a Fellow of Rose Bruford College of Theatre and Performance.

=== Olivier Awards for Best New Musical ===
- 1999: Whistle Down the Wind (Nomination)
- 2001: The Beautiful Game (Nomination)
- 2008: The Lord of the Rings (Nomination)
- 2013: Loserville (Nomination)

=== Tony Awards for Best Revival of a Musical ===
- 2000: Jesus Christ Superstar (Nomination)

=== Critics' Circle Theatre Awards for Best Musical ===
- 2001: The Beautiful Game (Won)

=== Dora Awards for Outstanding New Musical ===
- 2006: The Lord of the Rings (Won)

=== Bibi Ferreira Awards for Best Brazilian Musical ===
- 2016: Gabriela, Clove & Cinnamon (Won)

=== International Emmy Awards for Outstanding Performing Arts Program ===
- 2001: Jesus Christ Superstar (Won)

=== WhatOnStage Awards for Best Regional Production ===
- 2024: The Lord of the Rings – A Musical Tale (Won)
