= Gerry Graham =

English footballer

Personal information
- Full name: Gerald Wilson Graham
- Date of birth: 31 January 1941 (age 85)
- Place of birth: Aspatria, England
- Position: Midfielder

Senior career*
Years	Team	Apps	(Gls)
1959–1960	Blackpool	0	(0)
1960–1963	Peterborough United	17	(1)
1963–1964	Cambridge United		
1964–1965	Mansfield Town	18	(3)
1965–1966	Hereford United		
1966–1967	Cambridge City		
1967–1968	Worcester City		
1968–1969	Workington	6	(0)
1969	Nuneaton Borough		
Total		41	(4)
- * Club domestic league appearances and goals

Gerald Wilson Graham (born 31 January 1941) is an English former professional footballer who played in the Football League for Mansfield Town, Peterborough United and Workington.
