= Harry Middleton (footballer, born 1937) =

English footballer

Personal information
- Full name: Henry Middleton
- Date of birth: 18 March 1937 (age 89)
- Place of birth: Birmingham, England
- Position: Inside forward

Senior career*
Years	Team	Apps	(Gls)
1955–1956	Wolverhampton Wanderers	1	(0)
1959–1961	Scunthorpe United	29	(11)
1961–1962	Portsmouth	17	(5)
1962–1964	Shrewsbury Town	85	(36)
1964–1966	Mansfield Town	46	(24)
1966–1968	Walsall	59	(27)
1968	Worcester City		
1969	Tamworth		
Total		237	(103)
- * Club domestic league appearances and goals

Henry Middleton (born 18 March 1937) is an English former professional footballer who played in the Football League for Mansfield Town, Portsmouth, Scunthorpe United, Shrewsbury Town, Walsall and Wolverhampton Wanderers.
