= David Mallinson =

English footballer

Personal information
- Full name: David John Mallinson
- Date of birth: 7 July 1946 (age 80)
- Place of birth: Sheffield, England
- Position: Wing half

Senior career*
Years	Team	Apps	(Gls)
1965–1966	Mansfield Town	11	(1)
1952–1954	Lockheed Leamington		
Total		11	(1)
- * Club domestic league appearances and goals

David John Mallinson (born 7 July 1946) is an English former professional footballer who played in the Football League for Mansfield Town.
