= Alan Humphreys =

English footballer

Personal information
- Full name: Alan Humphreys
- Date of birth: 18 October 1939 (age 87)
- Place of birth: Chester, England
- Position: Goalkeeper

Senior career*
Years	Team	Apps	(Gls)
1956–1960	Shrewsbury Town	32	(0)
1960–1962	Leeds United	40	(0)
1962–1964	Gravesend & Northfleet United		
1964–1968	Mansfield Town	58	(0)
1968–1970	Chesterfield	51	(0)
- * Club domestic league appearances and goals

Alan Humphreys (born 18 November 1939) is a former professional footballer who played as a goalkeeper for Shrewsbury Town, Leeds United, Mansfield Town and Chesterfield in the 1950s and 1960s.

== Playing career ==
Humphreys was born on 18 November 1939 in Chester, England. He began his professional career at Shrewsbury Town in 1956, where he made 32 appearances in three seasons and built a reputation of being one of the best young goalkeepers in the lower divisions. In February 1960, he joined a declining Leeds United side that was relegated to the Second Division at the end of the 1959–60 season. He had an unhappy time at Leeds, losing confidence, and Don Revie brought in the experienced Tommy Younger and later Gary Sprake to fill the goalkeeping position. Humphreys left Leeds in August 1962 for non-league football before returning to league action with Mansfield Town in 1964–65 and later with Chesterfield.
