= Peter Kerr (footballer, born 1943) =

Scottish footballer

Personal information
- Full name: Peter Kerr
- Date of birth: 25 September 1943 (age 83)
- Place of birth: Paisley, Renfrewshire, Scotland
- Position: Inside forward

Senior career*
Years	Team	Apps	(Gls)
1959–1960	Drumchapel Amateur		
1960–1962	Partick Thistle	0	(0)
1962–1963	Third Lanark	0	(0)
1963–1965	Reading	41	(7)
1965	Port Elizabeth City		
Total		41	(7)
- * Club domestic league appearances and goals

Peter Kerr (born 25 September 1943) is a Scottish former professional footballer who played in the Football League for Reading.
