= Brian Macready =

English footballer

Personal information
- Full name: Brian Leslie Macready
- Date of birth: 25 March 1942
- Place of birth: Leicester, England
- Date of death: 2017 (aged 74–75)
- Position: Inside forward

Senior career*
Years	Team	Apps	(Gls)
1958–1959	Willerby Boys Club		
1959–1960	Hull City	0	(0)
1960–1964	West Bromwich Albion	14	(1)
1964–1966	Mansfield Town	50	(11)
1966	Worcester City		
1967	Banbury United		
Total		64	(12)
- * Club domestic league appearances and goals

Brian Leslie Macready (25 March 1942 – 2017) was an English professional footballer who played in the Football League for Mansfield Town and West Bromwich Albion.
