= 1966–67 Rochdale A.F.C. season =

English football club season

Rochdale
1966–67 season
- Manager: Tony Collins
- League Division Four: 21st
- FA Cup: 1st Round
- League Cup: 1st Round
- Top goalscorer: League: Reg Jenkins; All: Reg Jenkins

The 1966–67 season was Rochdale A.F.C.'s 60th in existence and their 8th consecutive in the Football League Fourth Division.

== Statistics ==
No.	Pos	Nat	Player	Total		Division 4		F.A. Cup		League Cup		Lancashire Cup		Rose Bowl	
No.	Pos	Nat	Player	Apps	Goals	Apps	Goals	Apps	Goals	Apps	Goals	Apps	Goals	Apps	Goals
	GK	(Scotland) SCO	Bobby Williamson	37	0	34+0	0	1+0	0	1+0	0	0+0	0	1+0	0
	DF	(England) ENG	Graham Smith	50	1	46+0	1	1+0	0	1+0	0	1+0	0	1+0	0
	DF	(England) ENG	Laurie Calloway	50	2	46+0	1	1+0	0	1+0	0	1+0	1	1+0	0
	MF	(England) ENG	Brian Richardson	21	1	19+0	1	0+0	0	1+0	0	0+0	0	1+0	0
	MF	(England) ENG	Brian Taylor	47	1	44+0	1	1+0	0	1+0	0	0+0	0	1+0	0
	MF	(England) ENG	Graham Collins	8	0	7+0	0	0+0	0	1+0	0	0+0	0	0+0	0
	MF	(England) ENG	Paul Crossley	16	2	14+0	2	0+0	0	1+0	0	0+0	0	1+0	0
	FW	(England) ENG	Billy Russell	37	7	34+0	7	1+0	0	1+0	0	0+0	0	1+0	0
	FW	(England) ENG	Ian McQueen	8	1	5+2	1	0+0	0	0+0	0	0+0	0	1+0	0
	FW	(England) ENG	Barrie Wheatley	17	13	13+0	13	1+0	0	1+0	0	1+0	0	1+0	0
	MF	(England) ENG	David Storf	46	8	43+0	6	1+0	1	1+0	0	0+0	0	1+0	1
	FW	(England) ENG	Bert Lister	12	2	11+0	2	0+0	0	1+0	0	0+0	0	0+0	0
	MF	(England) ENG	John Hardman	9	0	9+0	0	0+0	0	0+0	0	0+0	0	0+0	0
	FW	(England) ENG	Tony Moulden	1	0	1+0	0	0+0	0	0+0	0	0+0	0	0+0	0
	MF	(England) ENG	Jimmy Pennington	16	0	14+0	0	1+0	0	0+0	0	0+0	0	0+1	0
	FW	(England) ENG	Bob Stephenson	17	3	16+1	3	0+0	0	0+0	0	0+0	0	0+0	0
	DF	(England) ENG	Kevin Connor	20	1	18+0	1	1+0	0	0+0	0	1+0	0	0+0	0
	FW	(Scotland) SCO	Bill Calder	9	1	7+1	1	1+0	0	0+0	0	0+0	0	0+0	0
	FW	(England) ENG	Reg Jenkins	31	14	30+0	14	1+0	0	0+0	0	0+0	0	0+0	0
	FW	(England) ENG	Steve Melledew	24	1	22+1	1	0+0	0	0+0	0	1+0	0	0+0	0
	MF	(England) ENG	Ray Daubney	12	2	11+0	2	0+0	0	0+0	0	1+0	0	0+0	0
	FW	(England) ENG	Joe Fletcher	10	4	9+0	4	0+0	0	0+0	0	1+0	0	0+0	0
	MF	(Republic of Ireland) IRL	Frank McEwen	11	1	10+0	1	0+0	0	0+0	0	1+0	0	0+0	0
	DF	(England) ENG	Stewart Holden	21	0	21+0	0	0+0	0	0+0	0	0+0	0	0+0	0
	GK	(England) ENG	Simon Jones	13	0	12+0	0	0+0	0	0+0	0	0+0	0	0+1	0
	MF	(England) ENG	David Crompton	9	0	9+0	0	0+0	0	0+0	0	0+0	0	0+0	0
	DF	(England) ENG	David Dow	2	0	1+0	0	0+0	0	0+0	0	0+1	0	0+0	0
	GK		Roger? Cutler	1	0	0+0	0	0+0	0	0+0	0	1+0	0	0+0	0
	MF		Brian Hardman	1	0	0+0	0	0+0	0	0+0	0	1+0	0	0+0	0
	MF	(England) ENG	Hughen Riley	1	0	0+0	0	0+0	0	0+0	0	1+0	0	0+0	0
	DF	(England) ENG	Ray Aspden	1	0	0+0	0	0+0	0	0+0	0	0+0	0	1+0	0

== Final League Table ==
Pos	Team	Pld	W	D	L	GF	GA	GAv	Pts	Promotion or relegation
19	Chester	46	15	10	21	54	78	0.692	40	
20	Notts County	46	13	11	22	53	72	0.736	37	
21	Rochdale	46	13	11	22	53	75	0.707	37	Re-elected
22	York City	46	12	11	23	65	79	0.823	35	Re-elected
23	Bradford (Park Avenue)	46	11	13	22	52	79	0.658	35	Re-elected

Source: rsssf.com

== Competitions ==
=== Football League Fourth Division ===
20 August 1966 1	Crewe Alexandra	2–1	Rochdale	Crewe
	Kane 37'; Sandiford 58'	Report	Wheatley 55'	Stadium: Gresty Road; Attendance: 3069

27 August 1966 2	Rochdale	1–3	Barrow	Rochdale
	Lister 87'	Report	Mallon 57'; Mulholland 76'; McAdams 84'	Stadium: Spotland Stadium; Attendance: 2752

2 September 1966 3	York City	1–1	Rochdale	York
	Provan	Report	Wheatley	Stadium: Bootham Crescent; Attendance: 5046

6 September 1966 4	Rochdale	3–0	Luton Town	Rochdale
	Crossley; Wheatley; Russell	Report		Stadium: Spotland Stadium; Attendance: 2472

10 September 1966 5	Rochdale	1–0	Lincoln City	Rochdale
	Russell 14'	Report		Stadium: Spotland Stadium; Attendance: 2905

17 September 1966 6	Chesterfield	0–0	Rochdale	Chesterfield
		Report		Stadium: Saltergate Recreation Ground; Attendance: 5003

24 September 1966 7	Rochdale	1–0	Stockport County	Rochdale
	Storf 20'	Report		Stadium: Spotland Stadium; Attendance: 5756

29 September 1966 8	Luton Town	3–1	Rochdale	Luton
	Thear; Rioch	Report	Crossley	Stadium: Kenilworth Road; Attendance: 6435

1 October 1966 9	Aldershot	4–0	Rochdale	Aldershot
	McAnearney 59' (pen.); Maloy 65'; Dodson 77', 83'	Report		Stadium: Recreation Ground; Attendance: 4273

8 October 1966 10	Rochdale	1–1	Barnsley	Rochdale
	Richardson 71'	Report	Barton 30'	Stadium: Spotland Stadium; Attendance: 2784

15 October 1966 11	Newport County	2–2	Rochdale	Newport
	Jones 20'; Rathbone 26'	Report	Wheatley 17'; Stephenson 29'	Stadium: Somerton Park; Attendance: 4650

19 October 1966 12	Chester	3–2	Rochdale	Chester
	Talbot; Metcalf	Report	Storf; Stephenson	Stadium: Sealand Road; Attendance: 4316

22 October 1966 13	Rochdale	1–3	Brentford	Rochdale
	Russell 85'	Report	Lawther 25', 83'; Ross 34'	Stadium: Spotland Stadium; Attendance: 2632

29 October 1966 14	Halifax Town	1–1	Rochdale	Halifax
	Parks 70'	Report	McQueen 8'	Stadium: The Shay; Attendance: 2771

5 November 1966 15	Rochdale	3–2	Hartlepools United	Rochdale
	Russell 11', 18'; Calder 23'	Report	Mulvaney 40'; Phythian 80'	Stadium: Spotland Stadium; Attendance: 2005

12 November 1966 16	Exeter City	0–0	Rochdale	Exeter
		Report		Stadium: St James Park; Attendance: 3625

19 November 1966 17	Rochdale	0–1	Bradford City	Rochdale
		Report	Cuthbertson 72'	Stadium: Spotland Stadium; Attendance: 3108

3 December 1966 18	Rochdale	1–2	Southend United	Rochdale
	Lister 66'	Report	Flatt 32'; Slack 84'	Stadium: Spotland Stadium; Attendance: 1733

10 December 1966 19	Wrexham	4–2	Rochdale	Wrexham
	Lloyd 44', 60'; Stacey 57'; Carrick 86'	Report	Russell 55'; Storf 82'	Stadium: Racecourse Ground; Attendance: 6904

17 December 1966 20	Rochdale	0–1	Crewe Alexandra	Rochdale
		Report	Harley 15'	Stadium: Spotland Stadium; Attendance: 1432

27 December 1966 21	Notts County	2–0	Rochdale	Nottingham
	Smith 9', 85'	Report		Stadium: Meadow Lane; Attendance: 4810

31 December 1966 22	Barrow	2–0	Rochdale	Barrow-in-Furness
	Field 25'; Mulholland 57' (pen.)	Report		Stadium: Holker Street; Attendance: 6871

14 January 1967 23	Lincoln City	0–2	Rochdale	Lincoln
		Report	Storf 6'; Jenkins 21'	Stadium: Sincil Bank; Attendance: 3983

21 January 1967 24	Rochdale	2–1	Chesterfield	Rochdale
	Jenkins 59', 71'	Report	Stark 63'	Stadium: Spotland Stadium; Attendance: 2255

27 January 1967 25	Rochdale	1–1	Notts County	Rochdale
	Jenkins	Report	Smith	Stadium: Spotland Stadium; Attendance: 2358

3 February 1967 26	Stockport County	2–2	Rochdale	Stockport
	Morrin; Allen	Report	Stephenson; Daubney	Stadium: Edgeley Park; Attendance: 9908

11 February 1967 27	Rochdale	2–1	Aldershot	Rochdale
	Jenkins 65', 69' (pen.)	Report	Howarth 25'	Stadium: Spotland Stadium; Attendance: 2494

18 February 1967 28	Bradford Park Avenue	0–3	Rochdale	Bradford
		Report	Storf 37'; Jenkins 63' (pen.); McEwen 73'	Stadium: Park Avenue; Attendance: 4823

25 February 1967 29	Barnsley	3–1	Rochdale	Barnsley
	Evans 44'; Barton 55'; Thomas 67'	Report	Daubney 35'	Stadium: Oakwell; Attendance: 7585

1 March 1967 30	Rochdale	0–1	Chester	Rochdale
		Report	Ryden	Stadium: Spotland Stadium; Attendance: 2140

4 March 1967 31	Rochdale	2–0	Newport County	Rochdale
	Russell 17'; Jenkins 75'	Report		Stadium: Spotland Stadium; Attendance: 2039

11 March 1967 32	Rochdale	1–0	Bradford Park Avenue	Rochdale
	Jenkins 83'	Report		Stadium: Spotland Stadium; Attendance: 2143

18 March 1967 33	Brentford	4–0	Rochdale	Brentford
	Docherty 5'; Ross 8', 43'; Lawther 73'	Report		Stadium: Griffin Park; Attendance: 6610

25 March 1967 34	Rochdale	1–2	Tranmere Rovers	Rochdale
	Connor	Report	Yardley 28'; King 88'	Stadium: Spotland Stadium; Attendance: 2478

27 March 1967 35	Rochdale	1–2	Port Vale	Rochdale
	Taylor	Report	Richardson (o.g.); Goodfellow	Stadium: Spotland Stadium; Attendance: 2254

28 March 1967 36	Port Vale	5–0	Rochdale	Stoke-on-Trent
	Wilson; Poole; Goodfellow; Georgeson; Cullerton	Report		Stadium: Old Recreation Ground; Attendance: 3004

1 April 1967 37	Hartlepools United	2–1	Rochdale	Hartlepool
	Somers 71'; Broadbent 83'	Report	Jenkins 3'	Stadium: Victoria Park; Attendance: 5952

8 April 1967 38	Rochdale	1–0	Exeter City	Rochdale
	Calloway 42'	Report		Stadium: Spotland Stadium; Attendance: 1294

10 April 1967 39	Rochdale	1–1	Southport	Rochdale
	Smith	Report	Peat	Stadium: Spotland Stadium; Attendance: 2644

15 April 1967 40	Bradford City	4–1	Rochdale	Bradford
	Smith 15'; York 19'; Holden 59' (o.g.); Rackstraw 64'	Report	Fletcher 26'	Stadium: Valley Parade; Attendance: 4119

22 April 1967 41	Rochdale	3–0	Halifax Town	Rochdale
	Fletcher 10', 68'; Taylor (red card) 44'; Melledew 88'	Report	Hutchinson (red card) 44'	Stadium: Spotland Stadium; Attendance: 2416

24 April 1967 42	Southport	1–2	Rochdale	Southport
	Andrews	Report	Storf; Jenkins (pen.)	Stadium: Haig Avenue; Attendance: 5469

29 April 1967 43	Southend United	0–0	Rochdale	Southend-on-Sea
		Report		Stadium: Roots Hall; Attendance: 8236

2 May 1967 44	Rochdale	2–2	York City	Rochdale
	Jenkins (pen.)	Report	Spencer; Provan	Stadium: Spotland Stadium; Attendance: 2017

6 May 1967 45	Rochdale	1–3	Wrexham	Rochdale
	Fletcher 77'	Report	Campbell 42'; Kinsey 73'; Evans 81'	Stadium: Spotland Stadium; Attendance: 2066

12 May 1967 46	Tranmere Rovers	3–1	Rochdale	Birkenhead
	Williams; Stevens; Hudson	Report	Jenkins (pen.)	Stadium: Prenton Park; Attendance: 12123

=== F.A. Cup ===
26 November 1966 1	Rochdale	1–3	Barrow	Rochdale
	Storf 63'	Report	Field 35', 52'; McCarthy 83'	Stadium: Spotland Stadium; Attendance: 3784

=== League Cup ===
23 August 1966 1	Bury	2–0	Rochdale	Bury
	Owen; Turner	Report		Stadium: Gigg Lane; Attendance: 3724

=== Lancashire Cup ===
1	Rochdale	1–2	Bury	Rochdale
	Calloway (pen.)		Goal	Stadium: Spotland Stadium; Attendance: 709

=== Rose Bowl ===
Rochdale	1–2	Oldham Athletic	Rochdale
Storf		Goal	Stadium: Spotland Stadium; Attendance: 3807
