= 1965–66 Rochdale A.F.C. season =

English football club season

Rochdale
1965–66 season
- Manager: Tony Collins
- League Division Four: 21st
- FA Cup: 1st Round
- League Cup: 2nd Round
- Top goalscorer: League: Reg Jenkins; Bob Stephenson; All: Reg Jenkins

The 1965–66 season was Rochdale A.F.C.'s 59th in existence and their 7th consecutive in the Football League Fourth Division.

== Statistics ==
No.	Pos	Nat	Player	Total		Division 4		F.A. Cup		League Cup		Lancashire Cup		Rose Bowl	
No.	Pos	Nat	Player	Apps	Goals	Apps	Goals	Apps	Goals	Apps	Goals	Apps	Goals	Apps	Goals
	GK	(England) ENG	Simon Jones	32	0	29+0	0	0+0	0	2+0	0	0+0	0	1+0	0
	DF	(England) ENG	Roy Ridge	53	0	45+0	0	3+0	0	3+0	0	1+0	0	1+0	0
	DF	(England) ENG	Laurie Calloway	53	3	44+0	2	3+0	1	3+0	0	3+0	0	0+0	0
	MF	(England) ENG	Brian Birch	42	2	33+1	2	3+0	0	2+0	0	3+0	0	0+0	0
	DF	(England) ENG	Ray Aspden	45	0	37+0	0	2+0	0	2+0	0	3+0	0	1+0	0
	MF	(England) ENG	Jimmy Thompson	21	1	15+0	1	2+0	0	3+0	0	0+0	0	1+0	0
	MF	(England) ENG	Neville Bannister	23	2	18+1	2	0+0	0	1+0	0	2+0	0	1+0	0
	FW	(England) ENG	George Morton	48	11	41+1	11	2+0	0	3+0	0	1+0	0	0+0	0
	FW	(England) ENG	Bob Stephenson	41	15	34+0	13	1+0	0	2+0	1	3+0	0	1+0	1
	FW	(England) ENG	Reg Jenkins	48	20	39+0	13	3+0	4	3+0	2	2+0	1	1+0	0
	MF	(England) ENG	David Storf	36	6	32+0	6	1+0	0	0+0	0	2+0	0	1+0	0
	FW	(England) ENG	Bert Lister	37	15	29+0	11	3+0	2	3+0	1	1+0	1	1+0	0
	MF	(England) ENG	Barrie Ratcliffe	19	2	12+0	1	3+0	0	2+0	0	2+0	1	0+0	0
	MF	(England) ENG	John Hardman	2	0	1+0	0	0+0	0	0+0	0	0+0	0	1+0	0
	MF	(Scotland) SCO	George Sievwright	41	2	31+1	1	3+0	1	2+0	0	3+0	0	0+1	0
	MF	(England) ENG	Brian Taylor	36	5	31+1	4	1+0	0	1+0	0	1+0	1	1+0	0
	GK	(England) ENG	Ted Burgin	16	0	11+0	0	3+0	0	1+0	0	1+0	0	0+0	0
	FW	(England) ENG	Ian McQueen	10	3	9+0	3	0+0	0	0+0	0	1+0	0	0+0	0
	GK	(England) ENG	John Heath	8	0	6+0	0	0+0	0	0+0	0	2+0	0	0+0	0
	DF	(England) ENG	Kevin Connor	7	0	3+2	0	0+0	0	0+0	0	2+0	0	0+0	0
	FW	(England) ENG	Brian Handley	3	0	3+0	0	0+0	0	0+0	0	0+0	0	0+0	0
	MF	(England) ENG	Paul Crossley	3	0	3+0	0	0+0	0	0+0	0	0+0	0	0+0	0

== Final League Table ==
Pos	Team	Pld	W	D	L	GF	GA	GAv	Pts	Promotion or relegation
19	Port Vale	46	15	9	22	48	59	0.814	39	
20	Chesterfield	46	13	13	20	62	78	0.795	39	
21	Rochdale	46	16	5	25	71	87	0.816	37	Re-elected
22	Lincoln City	46	13	11	22	57	82	0.695	37	Re-elected
23	Bradford City	46	12	13	21	63	94	0.670	37	Re-elected

Source: rsssf.com

== Competitions ==
=== Football League Fourth Division ===
21 August 1965 1	Rochdale	1–0	Aldershot	Rochdale
	Storf 70'	Report		Stadium: Spotland Stadium; Attendance: 3955

24 August 1965 2	Bradford Park Avenue	1–2	Rochdale	Bradford
	Hector	Report	Stephenson; Bannister	Stadium: Park Avenue; Attendance: 5486

28 August 1965 3	Newport County	1–1	Rochdale	Newport
	Reynolds 75'	Report	Thompson 90'	Stadium: Rodney Parade; Attendance: 3673

4 September 1965 4	Rochdale	2–3	Torquay United	Rochdale
	Lister 29'; Jenkins 59'	Report	Spratt 29'; Northcott 60'; Kirkman 64'	Stadium: Spotland Stadium; Attendance: 3720

11 September 1965 5	Chesterfield	4–1	Rochdale	Chesterfield
	Taylor 19' (pen.); Hollett 34', 58'; Salisbury 44'	Report	Morton 35'	Stadium: Saltergate Recreation Ground; Attendance: 4887

14 September 1965 6	Rochdale	2–3	Bradford Park Avenue	Rochdale
	Jenkins; Morton	Report	Ham; Hector	Stadium: Spotland Stadium; Attendance: 4806

18 September 1965 7	Colchester United	2–0	Rochdale	Colchester
	Stratton 42', 75'	Report		Stadium: Layer Road; Attendance: 4919

24 September 1965 8	Rochdale	1–2	Luton Town	Rochdale
	Morton	Report	Read; O'Rourke	Stadium: Spotland Stadium; Attendance: 3962

2 October 1965 9	Barrow	0–2	Rochdale	Barrow-in-Furness
		Report	Morton 53'; Jenkins 81'	Stadium: Holker Street; Attendance: 4763

5 October 1965 10	Rochdale	3–0	Southport	Rochdale
	Lister; Storf; Morton	Report		Stadium: Spotland Stadium; Attendance: 4188

8 October 1965 11	Rochdale	5–1	Bradford City	Rochdale
	Lister; Morton; Ratcliffe	Report	Newton	Stadium: Spotland Stadium; Attendance: 4027

16 October 1965 12	Crewe Alexandra	3–1	Rochdale	Crewe
	Barnes 25'; Bradshaw 35', 58'	Report	Lister 7'	Stadium: Gresty Road; Attendance: 4019

22 October 1965 13	Rochdale	1–0	Port Vale	Rochdale
	Morton	Report		Stadium: Spotland Stadium; Attendance: 4195

29 October 1965 14	Halifax Town	4–1	Rochdale	Halifax
	McMillan; Smith; Fidler	Report	Stephenson	Stadium: The Shay; Attendance: 2786

5 November 1965 15	Rochdale	3–0	Chester	Rochdale
	Jenkins	Report		Stadium: Spotland Stadium; Attendance: 3122

20 November 1965 16	Rochdale	0–1	Lincoln City	Rochdale
		Report	Holmes	Stadium: Spotland Stadium; Attendance: 2547

22 November 1965 17	Southport	4–0	Rochdale	Southport
	Spence; Smith; Marshall	Report		Stadium: Haig Avenue; Attendance: 2326

10 December 1965 18	Tranmere Rovers	6–2	Rochdale	Birkenhead
	Sinclair; Manning; Dyson	Report	Lister; Birch	Stadium: Prenton Park; Attendance: 6463

18 December 1965 19	Rochdale	2–1	Crewe Alexandra	Rochdale
	Taylor 50'; Jenkins 85'	Report	Gowans 63'	Stadium: Spotland Stadium; Attendance: 1486

27 December 1965 20	Rochdale	6–0	Wrexham	Rochdale
	Bannister; Jenkins; McQueen; Stephenson; Morton	Report		Stadium: Spotland Stadium; Attendance: 4187

1 January 1966 21	Bradford City	2–1	Rochdale	Bradford
	Leek 12'; Hannah 41'	Report	McQueen	Stadium: Valley Parade; Attendance: 4807

8 January 1966 22	Rochdale	0–2	Notts County	Rochdale
		Report	Flower 35'; Sheridan 39'	Stadium: Spotland Stadium; Attendance: 2677

15 January 1966 23	Port Vale	2–1	Rochdale	Stoke-on-Trent
	Georgeson 52'; Rowland 87'	Report	Taylor 89'	Stadium: Vale Park; Attendance: 4262

29 January 1966 24	Aldershot	2–3	Rochdale	Aldershot
	Burton 33'; Maloy 48'	Report	Calloway 60'; Taylor 66', 81'	Stadium: Recreation Ground; Attendance: 2967

5 February 1966 25	Rochdale	2–1	Newport County	Rochdale
	Storf 11'; Morton 80'	Report	Smith 44'	Stadium: Spotland Stadium; Attendance: 2167

12 February 1966 26	Rochdale	0–1	Doncaster Rovers	Rochdale
		Report	Jeffrey 3'	Stadium: Spotland Stadium; Attendance: 2542

19 February 1966 27	Torquay United	4–0	Rochdale	Torquay
	Stubbs 17', 35', 65'; Clarke 69'	Report		Stadium: Plainmoor; Attendance: 5504

26 February 1966 28	Rochdale	1–1	Chesterfield	Rochdale
	Jenkins 2'	Report	Hollett 68'	Stadium: Spotland Stadium; Attendance: 2292

28 February 1966 29	Darlington	3–1	Rochdale	Darlington
	Ratcliffe; Hutchinson	Report	Stephenson	Stadium: Feethams; Attendance: 8633

4 March 1966 30	Doncaster Rovers	2–0	Rochdale	Doncaster
	Sheffield	Report		Stadium: Belle Vue; Attendance: 12255

8 March 1966 31	Barnsley	5–0	Rochdale	Barnsley
	Bettany; Hayes; Earnshaw	Report		Stadium: Oakwell; Attendance: 3426

11 March 1966 32	Rochdale	0–1	Colchester United	Rochdale
		Report	Stratton	Stadium: Spotland Stadium; Attendance: 1780

19 March 1966 33	Luton Town	4–1	Rochdale	Luton
	O'Rourke 43', 44', 65'; Riddick 86'	Report	Storf	Stadium: Kenilworth Road; Attendance: 7381

25 March 1966 34	Rochdale	4–0	Barrow	Rochdale
	Stephenson; Lister; Jenkins	Report		Stadium: Spotland Stadium; Attendance: 1743

30 March 1966 35	Wrexham	2–2	Rochdale	Wrexham
	Kinsey; Griffiths	Report	Jenkins; Lister	Stadium: Racecourse Ground; Attendance: 5390

2 April 1966 36	Chester	1–2	Rochdale	Chester
	Metcalf 75' (pen.)	Report	Stephenson 17', 69'	Stadium: Sealand Road; Attendance: 6361

9 April 1966 37	Rochdale	4–0	Stockport County	Rochdale
	Stephenson 22'; Lister 26'; Calloway 34'; Storf 75'	Report		Stadium: Spotland Stadium; Attendance: 3281

11 April 1966 38	Rochdale	2–1	Barnsley	Rochdale
	Jenkins (pen.); Lister	Report	Addy	Stadium: Spotland Stadium; Attendance: 3316

16 April 1966 39	Lincoln City	2–0	Rochdale	Lincoln
	Fencott 63', 66'	Report		Stadium: Sincil Bank; Attendance: 2884

19 April 1966 40	Rochdale	0–1	Halifax Town	Rochdale
		Report	Balmer	Stadium: Spotland Stadium; Attendance: 2186

22 April 1966 41	Rochdale	1–2	Darlington	Rochdale
	Morton	Report	Hutchinson; Cummings	Stadium: Spotland Stadium; Attendance: 2427

26 April 1966 42	Rochdale	3–1	Hartlepools United	Rochdale
	Lister; Stephenson	Report	McPheat	Stadium: Spotland Stadium; Attendance: 1964

29 April 1966 43	Stockport County	3–1	Rochdale	Stockport
	Price; Young; White	Report	Sievwright	Stadium: Edgeley Park; Attendance: 5503

6 May 1966 44	Rochdale	3–5	Tranmere Rovers	Rochdale
	Birch; Stephenson; King (o.g.)	Report	Barry Dyson; Manning; Pritchard	Stadium: Spotland Stadium; Attendance: 2085

16 May 1966 45	Hartlepools United	0–0	Rochdale	Hartlepool
		Report		Stadium: Victoria Park; Attendance: 5779

21 May 1966 46	Notts County	3–3	Rochdale	Nottingham
	Still 3', 53'; Bates 70'	Report	McQueen 11'; Storf 45'; Stephenson 82'	Stadium: Meadow Lane; Attendance: 3488

=== F.A. Cup ===
13 November 1965 1	Fleetwood	2–2	Rochdale	Fleetwood
	Robinson 25'; Strachan 53'	Report	Lister 32'; Sievwright 84'	Stadium: Highbury Stadium; Attendance: 6150

17 November 1965 1	Rochdale	5–0	Fleetwood	Rochdale
	Lister; Jenkins; Calloway	Report		Stadium: Spotland Stadium; Attendance: 5084

9 December 1965 2	Rochdale	1–3	Altrincham F.C.	Rochdale
	Jenkins	Report	Connolly; Campbell; Swindells	Stadium: Spotland Stadium; Attendance: 8367

=== League Cup ===
1 September 1965 1	Barrow	1–1	Rochdale	Barrow-in-Furness
	Knox	Report	Stephenson	Stadium: Holker Street; Attendance: 4814

8 September 1965 1	Rochdale	3–1	Barrow	Rochdale
	Jenkins; Lister	Report	Rawlingson	Stadium: Spotland Stadium; Attendance: 2090

22 September 1965 2	Southampton	3–0	Rochdale	Southampton
	Chivers 21', 26', 88'	Report		Stadium: The Dell; Attendance: 12188

=== Lancashire Cup ===
2 November 1965 1	Rochdale	1–0	Manchester City	Rochdale
	Ratcliffe			Stadium: Spotland Stadium; Attendance: 1115

23 February 1966 2	Chester	1–3	Rochdale	Chester
	Goal		Lister; Jenkins	Stadium: Sealand Road; Attendance: 2104

14 April 1966 SF	Burnley	2–0	Rochdale	Burnley
	Goal			Stadium: Turf Moor; Attendance: 1338

=== Rose Bowl ===
11 August 1965	Oldham Athletic	1–1	Rochdale	Oldham
	Goal		Stephenson	Stadium: Boundary Park; Attendance: 6723
