= 1964–65 Rochdale A.F.C. season =

English football club season

Rochdale
1964–65 season
- Manager: Tony Collins
- League Division Four: 6th
- FA Cup: 1st Round
- League Cup: 2nd Round
- Top goalscorer: League: Reg Jenkins; All: Reg Jenkins

The 1964–65 season was Rochdale A.F.C.'s 58th in existence and their 6th consecutive in the Football League Fourth Division.

== Statistics ==
No.	Pos	Nat	Player	Total		Division 4		F.A. Cup		League Cup		Lancashire Cup		Rose Bowl	
No.	Pos	Nat	Player	Apps	Goals	Apps	Goals	Apps	Goals	Apps	Goals	Apps	Goals	Apps	Goals
	GK	(England) ENG	Ted Burgin	51	0	46	0	1	0	2	0	1	0	1	0
	DF	(England) ENG	Roy Ridge	44	0	40	0	0	0	2	0	1	0	1	0
	DF	(England) ENG	Laurie Calloway	49	0	45	0	1	0	2	0	0	0	1	0
	MF	(England) ENG	Graham Cunliffe	41	0	36	0	1	0	2	0	1	0	1	0
	DF	(England) ENG	Ray Aspden	50	0	45	0	1	0	2	0	1	0	1	0
	MF	(England) ENG	Jimmy Thompson	50	5	45	5	1	0	2	0	1	0	1	0
	FW	(England) ENG	Joe Richardson	35	7	31	5	0	0	2	1	1	1	1	0
	FW	(England) ENG	George Morton	38	17	35	17	0	0	2	0	0	0	1	0
	FW	(England) ENG	John Turley	26	7	22	5	1	0	1	1	1	0	1	1
	FW	(England) ENG	Reg Jenkins	50	25	46	25	1	0	2	0	0	0	1	0
	MF	(England) ENG	David Storf	21	4	18	3	1	0	2	1	0	0	0	0
	MF	(England) ENG	Brian Taylor	12	2	11	2	0	0	1	0	0	0	0	0
	MF	(England) ENG	Brian Birch	29	4	27	4	1	0	0	0	1	0	0	0
	MF	(England) ENG	Don MacKenzie	24	2	23	2	0	0	0	0	0	0	1	0
	DF	(England) ENG	Stanley Milburn	16	1	14	1	1	0	0	0	1	0	0	0
	MF	(England) ENG	John Hardman	8	0	6	0	1	0	0	0	1	0	0	0
	FW	(England) ENG	Bert Lister	16	3	16	3	0	0	0	0	0	0	0	0
	FW		Brian Hardman	1	0	0	0	0	0	0	0	1	0	0	0

== Final League Table ==
Pos	Team	Pld	W	D	L	GF	GA	GAv	Pts	Promotion or relegation
4	Oxford United (P)	46	23	15	8	87	44	1.977	61	Promotion to the Third Division
5	Tranmere Rovers	46	27	6	13	99	56	1.768	60	
6	Rochdale	46	22	14	10	74	53	1.396	58	
7	Bradford (Park Avenue)	46	20	17	9	86	62	1.387	57	
8	Chester	46	25	6	15	119	81	1.469	56	

Source: rsssf.com
(P) Promoted

== Competitions ==
=== Football League Fourth Division ===
22 August 1964 1	York City	2–1	Rochdale	York
	Aimson 74'; Provan 81'	Report	Richardson 43'	Stadium: Bootham Crescent; Attendance: 4348

26 August 1964 2	Rochdale	4–0	Stockport County	Rochdale
	Jenkins; Morton	Report		Stadium: Spotland Stadium; Attendance: 4458

29 August 1964 3	Rochdale	2–0	Lincoln City	Rochdale
	Morton 8'; Richardson 22'	Report		Stadium: Spotland Stadium; Attendance: 4306

5 September 1964 4	Brighton & Hove Albion	3–0	Rochdale	Brighton and Hove
	Collins 24'; Smith 39'; Goodchild 64'	Report		Stadium: Goldstone Ground; Attendance: 14023

7 September 1964 5	Rochdale	1–0	Torquay United	Rochdale
	Morton	Report		Stadium: Spotland Stadium; Attendance: 4641

12 September 1964 6	Rochdale	3–3	Oxford United	Rochdale
	Jenkins 10'; Beavon 20' (o.g.); Morton 31'	Report	Havenhand 25'; Booth 30', 42'	Stadium: Spotland Stadium; Attendance: 4473; Referee: DNH Payne

16 September 1964 7	Torquay United	2–1	Rochdale	Torquay
	Atkinson; Panter	Report	Turley	Stadium: Plainmoor; Attendance: 5238

19 September 1964 8	Barrow	2–2	Rochdale	Barrow-in-Furness
	Knox 8'; Brennan 39'	Report	Morton 52'; Jenkins 85'	Stadium: Holker Street; Attendance: 3159

26 September 1964 9	Rochdale	3–0	Hartlepools United	Rochdale
	Jenkins 54', 88'; Morton 87'	Report		Stadium: Spotland Stadium; Attendance: 3736

30 September 1964 10	Rochdale	3–1	Bradford City	Rochdale
	Storf; Turley; Jenkins	Report	Stowell	Stadium: Spotland Stadium; Attendance: 4623

3 October 1964 11	Wrexham	2–3	Rochdale	Wrexham
	Colbridge 44'; Barnes 65' (pen.)	Report	Jenkins 35'; Turley 54', 73'	Stadium: Racecourse Ground; Attendance: 7184

7 October 1964 12	Bradford City	0–2	Rochdale	Bradford
		Report	Jenkins	Stadium: Valley Parade; Attendance: 3395

10 October 1964 13	Rochdale	1–1	Darlington	Rochdale
	Morton 40'	Report	Lawton 20'	Stadium: Spotland Stadium; Attendance: 5007

14 October 1964 14	Rochdale	2–1	Chester	Rochdale
	Jenkins; Morton	Report	Humes	Stadium: Spotland Stadium; Attendance: 4845

17 October 1964 15	Crewe Alexandra	1–1	Rochdale	Crewe
	Gowans 30'	Report	Jenkins 14'; Calloway (red card) 30'	Stadium: Gresty Road; Attendance: 3619

24 October 1964 16	Rochdale	2–0	Newport County	Rochdale
	Storf 22' (pen.); Birch 68'	Report		Stadium: Spotland Stadium; Attendance: 4283

26 October 1964 17	Southport	1–0	Rochdale	Southport
	Aspden (o.g.)	Report		Stadium: Haig Avenue; Attendance: 3642

31 October 1964 18	Halifax Town	1–2	Rochdale	Halifax
	Frear 69'	Report	MacKenzie 3'; Jenkins 40'	Stadium: The Shay; Attendance: 4089

7 November 1964 19	Rochdale	1–1	Notts County	Rochdale
	Jenkins 15'	Report	Sheridan 71'	Stadium: Spotland Stadium; Attendance: 4804; Referee: GW Grundy

21 November 1964 20	Rochdale	2–1	Doncaster Rovers	Rochdale
	Storf 59' (pen.); Jenkins 85'	Report	Tait 16'	Stadium: Spotland Stadium; Attendance: 4752

28 November 1964 21	Aldershot	1–2	Rochdale	Aldershot
	Kearns 14'	Report	Thompson 7'; Jenkins 78'	Stadium: Recreation Ground; Attendance: 5412

5 December 1964 Abandoned	Rochdale	0–1	Tranmere Rovers	Rochdale
			Goal	Stadium: Spotland Stadium; Attendance: 5008

12 December 1964 22	Rochdale	1–2	York City	Rochdale
	Turley 35'	Report	Rudd 49'; Wilkinson 68'	Stadium: Spotland Stadium; Attendance: 3051

18 December 1964 23	Lincoln City	1–1	Rochdale	Lincoln
	Milner	Report	Jenkins	Stadium: Sincil Bank; Attendance: 3177

26 December 1964 24	Tranmere Rovers	4–1	Rochdale	Birkenhead
	McDonnell 30'; Dyson 34'; Jones 39', 41'	Report	Morton 68'	Stadium: Prenton Park; Attendance: 13497

28 December 1964 25	Rochdale	0–1	Tranmere Rovers	Rochdale
		Report	Dyson (pen.)	Stadium: Spotland Stadium; Attendance: 5008

9 January 1965 26	Rochdale	4–3	Bradford Park Avenue	Rochdale
	Jenkins 3', 12'; Thompson 20'; McCalman 30' (o.g.)	Report	Ham 75'; Lawrie 80' (pen.); Hector 85'	Stadium: Spotland Stadium; Attendance: 4377

16 January 1965 27	Oxford United	2–2	Rochdale	Oxford
	Atkinson 2', 86'	Report	Taylor 40'; Richardson 42'	Stadium: Manor Ground; Attendance: 8681; Referee: JE Cooke

23 January 1965 28	Rochdale	3–0	Barrow	Rochdale
	Milburn 44'; Richardson 73'; Taylor 79'	Report		Stadium: Spotland Stadium; Attendance: 3812

30 January 1965 29	Chesterfield	1–1	Rochdale	Chesterfield
	Hollett 33'	Report	Jenkins 70'	Stadium: Saltergate Recreation Ground; Attendance: 5091

6 February 1965 30	Hartlepools United	1–1	Rochdale	Hartlepool
	Bradley 85'	Report	Birch 34'	Stadium: Victoria Park; Attendance: 5049

13 February 1965 31	Rochdale	2–1	Wrexham	Rochdale
	Thompson 25'; Lister 60'	Report	King 75'	Stadium: Spotland Stadium; Attendance: 3728

15 February 1965 32	Stockport County	1–2	Rochdale	Stockport
	Hoggart	Report	Morton; Thompson	Stadium: Edgeley Park; Attendance: 8645

20 February 1965 33	Darlington	2–0	Rochdale	Darlington
	Lawton 10'; O'Neill 73'	Report		Stadium: Feethams; Attendance: 2606

27 February 1965 34	Rochdale	1–0	Crewe Alexandra	Rochdale
	Jenkins 49'	Report		Stadium: Spotland Stadium; Attendance: 4442

10 March 1965 35	Chester	0–1	Rochdale	Chester
		Report	Jenkins	Stadium: Sealand Road; Attendance: 8550

13 March 1965 36	Rochdale	3–0	Halifax Town	Rochdale
	MacKenzie 50'; Morton 65'; Lister 76'	Report		Stadium: Spotland Stadium; Attendance: 4829

20 March 1965 37	Notts County	0–0	Rochdale	Nottingham
		Report		Stadium: Meadow Lane; Attendance: 3219; Referee: PG Brandwood

22 March 1965 38	Rochdale	2–2	Brighton & Hove Albion	Rochdale
	Morton; Thompson (pen.); Lister (red card) 76'	Report	Goodchild; Collins; Gall (red card) 76'	Stadium: Spotland Stadium; Attendance: 7005; Referee: K Howley

26 March 1965 39	Rochdale	1–2	Chesterfield	Rochdale
	Morton	Report	Holmes	Stadium: Spotland Stadium; Attendance: 6383

29 March 1965 40	Newport County	2–3	Rochdale	Newport
	Sheffield; Hill	Report	Birch; Jenkins; Lister	Stadium: Rodney Parade; Attendance: 2761

3 April 1965 41	Doncaster Rovers	2–2	Rochdale	Doncaster
	Jeffrey 10'; Grainger 27'	Report	Jenkins 4'; Birch 86'	Stadium: Belle Vue; Attendance: 7842

10 April 1965 42	Rochdale	3–1	Aldershot	Rochdale
	Jenkins 1'; Morton 53', 54'	Report	Priscott 58'	Stadium: Spotland Stadium; Attendance: 4139

16 April 1965 43	Millwall	0–0	Rochdale	London
		Report		Stadium: The Den; Attendance: 15389

17 April 1965 44	Bradford Park Avenue	0–0	Rochdale	Bradford
		Report		Stadium: Park Avenue; Attendance: 10636

21 April 1965 45	Rochdale	0–2	Millwall	Rochdale
		Report	John (pen.); Curran	Stadium: Spotland Stadium; Attendance: 8031

24 April 1965 46	Rochdale	2–0	Southport	Rochdale
	Richardson 44'; Morton 60'	Report		Stadium: Spotland Stadium; Attendance: 2882

=== F.A. Cup ===
14 November 1964 1	Workington	2–0	Rochdale	Workington
	Carr 70'; Moran 81'	Report		Stadium: Borough Park; Attendance: 5376

=== League Cup ===
2 September 1964 1	Stockport County	1–3	Rochdale	Stockport
	Hoggart	Report	Storf; Richardson; Turley	Stadium: Edgeley Park; Attendance: 3450

23 September 1964 2	Rotherham United	2–0	Rochdale	Rotherham
	Casper; Tiler	Report		Stadium: Millmoor; Attendance: 8934

=== Lancashire Cup ===
3 November 1964	Bury	2–1	Rochdale	Bury
	Goal		Richardson	Stadium: Gigg Lane; Attendance: 2608

=== Rose Bowl ===
14 August 1964	Rochdale	1–2	Oldham Athletic	Rochdale
	Turley		Goal	Stadium: Spotland Stadium; Attendance: 5160
