= 1962–63 Rochdale A.F.C. season =

English football club season

Rochdale
1962–63 season
- Manager: Tony Collins
- League Division Four: 7th
- FA Cup: 1st Round
- League Cup: 1st Round
- Top goalscorer: League: Ronnie Cairns; George Morton; All: Ronnie Cairns; George Morton

The 1962–63 season was Rochdale A.F.C.'s 56th in existence and their 4th in the Football League Fourth Division.

== Statistics ==
No.	Pos	Nat	Player	Total		Division 4		F.A. Cup		League Cup		Lancashire Cup		Rose Bowl	
No.	Pos	Nat	Player	Apps	Goals	Apps	Goals	Apps	Goals	Apps	Goals	Apps	Goals	Apps	Goals
	GK	(England) ENG	Ted Burgin	52	0	46	0	2	0	2	0	1	0	1	0
	DF	(England) ENG	Stanley Milburn	45	3	40	3	2	0	2	0	0	0	1	0
	DF	(Scotland) SCO	Doug Winton	47	0	41	0	2	0	2	0	1	0	1	0
	FW	(England) ENG	Stan Hepton	41	1	35	1	2	0	2	0	1	0	1	0
	DF	(England) ENG	Ray Aspden	46	1	42	1	2	0	1	0	1	0	0	0
	MF	(England) ENG	Jimmy Thompson	46	2	40	2	2	0	2	0	1	0	1	0
	MF	(England) ENG	Doug Wragg	48	2	42	2	2	0	2	0	1	0	1	0
	FW	(England) ENG	Don Watson	37	9	33	8	2	0	2	1	0	0	0	0
	FW	(England) ENG	Louis Bimpson	23	6	21	5	0	0	0	0	1	0	1	1
	FW	(England) ENG	Ronnie Cairns	43	15	40	14	0	0	1	0	1	0	1	1
	MF	(England) ENG	Colin Whitaker	13	3	10	3	0	0	2	0	0	0	1	0
	DF	(Scotland) SCO	Jack Martin	19	0	16	0	0	0	2	0	1	0	0	0
	MF	(England) ENG	John Hardman	8	1	6	1	0	0	1	0	0	0	1	0
	FW	(England) ENG	Joe Richardson	25	6	24	6	0	0	1	0	0	0	0	0
	DF	(England) ENG	Norman Bodell	4	0	3	0	0	0	0	0	0	0	1	0
	FW	(England) ENG	George Morton	33	14	30	14	2	0	0	0	1	0	0	0
	MF	(England) ENG	Peter Phoenix	34	5	32	4	2	1	0	0	0	0	0	0
	FW	(England) ENG	Tony Moulden	8	1	5	1	2	0	0	0	1	0	0	0

== Final League Table ==
Pos	Team	Pld	W	D	L	GF	GA	GAv	Pts
5	Gillingham	46	22	13	11	71	49	1.449	57
6	Torquay United	46	20	16	10	75	56	1.339	56
7	Rochdale	46	20	11	15	67	59	1.136	51
8	Tranmere Rovers	46	20	10	16	81	67	1.209	50
9	Barrow	46	19	12	15	82	80	1.025	50

Source: rsssf.com

== Competitions ==
=== Football League Fourth Division ===
18 August 1962 1	Mansfield Town	1–0	Rochdale	Mansfield
	Wagstaff 47'	Report		Stadium: Field Mill; Attendance: 6121; Referee: KH Burns

25 August 1962 2	Rochdale	3–2	Workington	Rochdale
	Whitaker 35', 80'; Cairns 57'	Report	Lowes 48', 50'	Stadium: Spotland Stadium; Attendance: 2850; Referee: JE Thacker

27 August 1962 3	Stockport County	1–0	Rochdale	Stockport
	Whitelaw 42'	Report		Stadium: Edgeley Park; Attendance: 6389

1 September 1962 4	Exeter City	0–2	Rochdale	Exeter
		Report	Hardman 1'; Cairns 30'	Stadium: St James Park; Attendance: 4320; Referee: JK Taylor

8 September 1962 5	Rochdale	3–2	Chesterfield	Rochdale
	Watson 12', 73'; Cairns 89'	Report	Duncan 67'; Rackstraw 88'	Stadium: Spotland Stadium; Attendance: 3649; Referee: H Webb

12 September 1962 6	Gillingham	2–1	Rochdale	Gillingham
	Francis 24'; Waldock 59'	Report	Richardson	Stadium: Priestfield Stadium; Attendance: 5851

15 September 1962 7	Rochdale	1–1	Oldham Athletic	Rochdale
	Watson 35'	Report	Colquhoun 23'	Stadium: Spotland Stadium; Attendance: 12125; Referee: K Howley

22 September 1962 8	Brentford	1–0	Rochdale	Brentford
	McLeod 87'	Report		Stadium: Griffin Park; Attendance: 10753; Referee: NCH Burtenshaw

29 September 1962 9	Rochdale	1–0	York City	Rochdale
	Bimpson 7'	Report		Stadium: Spotland Stadium; Attendance: 3030; Referee: LJ Tirebuck

2 October 1962 10	Rochdale	6–0	Barrow	Rochdale
	Whitaker; Bimpson; Morton; Wragg	Report		Stadium: Spotland Stadium; Attendance: 3234

6 October 1962 11	Hartlepools United	4–0	Rochdale	Hartlepool
	McLean 5', 65'; Edgar 50', 89'	Report		Stadium: Victoria Park; Attendance: 3850

13 October 1962 12	Rochdale	1–1	Darlington	Rochdale
	Bimpson 20'	Report	Lawton 53'	Stadium: Spotland Stadium; Attendance: 3131; Referee: KG Aston

16 October 1962 13	Rochdale	1–0	Stockport County	Rochdale
	Thompson 70' (pen.)	Report		Stadium: Spotland Stadium; Attendance: 3797

20 October 1962 14	Southport	1–1	Rochdale	Southport
	Spence 64'	Report	Milburn 82'	Stadium: Haig Avenue; Attendance: 4231; Referee: VJ Batty

23 October 1962 15	Rochdale	3–1	Doncaster Rovers	Rochdale
	Morton 11', 85'; Aspden 86'	Report	Booth 46'	Stadium: Spotland Stadium; Attendance: 3534

27 October 1962 16	Rochdale	1–1	Aldershot	Rochdale
	Morton 6'	Report	Woan 36'	Stadium: Spotland Stadium; Attendance: 2905; Referee: P Rhodes

30 October 1962 17	Doncaster Rovers	2–2	Rochdale	Doncaster
	Booth; Rooney	Report	Watson; Moulden	Stadium: Belle Vue; Attendance: 9764; Referee: AW Sparling

10 November 1962 18	Rochdale	2–1	Oxford United	Rochdale
	Cairns 16'; Morton 50'	Report	Knight 67'	Stadium: Spotland Stadium; Attendance: 2351; Referee: G McCabe

17 November 1962 19	Bradford City	1–2	Rochdale	Bradford
	Devitt 77'	Report	Watson 8'; Morton 32'	Stadium: Valley Parade; Attendance: 4396; Referee: RTE Langdale

1 December 1962 20	Torquay United	2–1	Rochdale	Torquay
	Jenkins 33'; Northcott 64'	Report	Watson 48'	Stadium: Plainmoor; Attendance: 4155

15 December 1962 21	Rochdale	3–1	Mansfield Town	Rochdale
	Phoenix 36', 46'; Morton 80'	Report	Hall 86'	Stadium: Spotland Stadium; Attendance: 2375

22 December 1962 22	Workington	1–0	Rochdale	Workington
	Commons 85'	Report		Stadium: Borough Park; Attendance: 2173

29 December 1962 23	Rochdale	2–0	Crewe Alexandra	Rochdale
	Phoenix 36'; Watson 84'	Report		Stadium: Spotland Stadium; Attendance: 3596

2 February 1963 24	Oldham Athletic	5–1	Rochdale	Oldham
	Whitaker 34', 79'; Lister 72', 87'; Colquhoun 81'	Report	Cairns 65'	Stadium: Boundary Park; Attendance: 14839

5 March 1963 25	Rochdale	1–1	Gillingham	Rochdale
	Watson	Report	Godfrey	Stadium: Spotland Stadium; Attendance: 2,442

9 March 1963 26	Rochdale	1–0	Southport	Rochdale
	Bimpson 62'	Report		Stadium: Spotland Stadium; Attendance: 2,327

12 March 1963 27	Rochdale	2–1	Hartlepools United	Rochdale
	Milburn (pen.); Cairns	Report	Godbold	Stadium: Spotland Stadium; Attendance: 2,857

16 March 1963 28	Aldershot	2–0	Rochdale	Aldershot
	Norris 4'; Priscott 87'	Report		Stadium: Recreation Ground; Attendance: 4,693

20 March 1963 29	Rochdale	3–5	Brentford	Rochdale
	Milburn 58' (pen.); Morton 67', 80'	Report	Dick 26', 40', 74'; McAdams 54'; Brooks 83'	Stadium: Spotland Stadium; Attendance: 5,680

23 March 1963 30	Rochdale	3–3	Newport County	Rochdale
	Richardson 22', 39'; Morton 73'	Report	Smith 44'; Hudson 57'; Hunt 66'	Stadium: Spotland Stadium; Attendance: 2,829

27 March 1963 31	Crewe Alexandra	1–2	Rochdale	Crewe
	Lord	Report	Richardson; Phoenix	Stadium: Gresty Road; Attendance: 6,073

30 March 1963 32	Tranmere Rovers	3–2	Rochdale	Birkenhead
	King 21'; Dyson 31'; Hickson 47'	Report	Hepton 33'; Cairns 68'	Stadium: Prenton Park; Attendance: 8,819

6 April 1963 33	Rochdale	2–1	Bradford City	Rochdale
	Richardson 1'; Thompson 69'	Report	Storton 44'	Stadium: Spotland Stadium; Attendance: 2,710

8 April 1963 34	Darlington	3–0	Rochdale	Darlington
	Lawton; Robson; Maltby	Report		Stadium: Feethams; Attendance: 3,129

13 April 1963 35	Oxford United	0–0	Rochdale	Oxford
		Report		Stadium: Manor Ground; Attendance: 6,085

15 April 1963 36	Chester	1–0	Rochdale	Chester
	Fitzgerald (pen.)	Report		Stadium: Sealand Road; Attendance: 4,979

16 April 1963 37	Rochdale	0–0	Chester	Rochdale
		Report		Stadium: Spotland Stadium; Attendance: 2,926

20 April 1963 38	Rochdale	3–0	Torquay United	Rochdale
	Cairns 63'; Wragg 82', 83'	Report		Stadium: Spotland Stadium; Attendance: 1,785

22 April 1963 39	Barrow	1–1	Rochdale	Barrow-in-Furness
	Darwin	Report	Cairns	Stadium: Holker Street; Attendance: 3,928

27 April 1963 40	Lincoln City	3–0	Rochdale	Lincoln
	Campbell 55'; Franks 58'; Punter 82'	Report		Stadium: Sincil Bank; Attendance: 2,281

4 May 1963 41	York City	1–0	Rochdale	York
	Gould 42'	Report		Stadium: Bootham Crescent; Attendance: 4,442

7 May 1963 42	Rochdale	1–0	Lincoln City	Rochdale
	Morton	Report		Stadium: Spotland Stadium; Attendance: 2,101

11 May 1963 43	Rochdale	3–0	Exeter City	Rochdale
	Morton 33'; Cairns 39', 71'	Report		Stadium: Spotland Stadium; Attendance: 1,403

17 May 1963 44	Chesterfield	1–3	Rochdale	Chesterfield
	Clarke (pen.)	Report	Cairns; Richardson	Stadium: Saltergate Recreation Ground; Attendance: 4,412

20 May 1963 45	Newport County	1–1	Rochdale	Newport
	Bonson	Report	Morton	Stadium: Rodney Parade; Attendance: 2,387

23 May 1963 46	Rochdale	2–0	Tranmere Rovers	Rochdale
	Cairns; Wragg	Report		Stadium: Spotland Stadium; Attendance: 2,385

== Final League Table ==
Pos	Team	Pld	W	D	L	GF	GA	GAv	Pts
5	Gillingham	46	22	13	11	71	49	1.449	57
6	Torquay United	46	20	16	10	75	56	1.339	56
7	Rochdale	46	20	11	15	67	59	1.136	51
8	Tranmere Rovers	46	20	10	16	81	67	1.209	50
9	Barrow	46	19	12	15	82	80	1.025	50

Source: rsssf.com

=== F.A. Cup ===
3 November 1962 1	York City	0–0	Rochdale	York
		Report		Stadium: Bootham Crescent; Attendance: 4,655; Referee: MA Fussey

6 November 1962 1	Rochdale	1–2	York City	Rochdale
	Phoenix	Report	Wilkinson; Wragg	Stadium: Spotland Stadium; Attendance: 6,225

=== League Cup ===
5 September 1962 1	Southport	0–0	Rochdale	Southport
		Report		Stadium: Haig Avenue; Attendance: 3,559

18 September 1962 1	Rochdale	1–2 (a.e.t.)	Southport	Rochdale
	Watson	Report	Blain	Stadium: Spotland Stadium; Attendance: 3,434

=== Lancashire Cup ===
26 September 1962	Blackpool	3–0	Rochdale	Blackpool
	Goal			Stadium: Bloomfield Road

=== Rose Bowl ===
11 August 1962	Rochdale	2–3	Oldham Athletic	Rochdale
	Whitaker; Cairns		Goal	Stadium: Spotland Stadium; Attendance: 6146
