= List of Barrow A.F.C. seasons =

Barrow Association Football Club is an English football club based in the town of Barrow-in-Furness, Cumbria. Founded in 1901, the team began in that season's Lancashire League, joined the Lancashire Combination in its newly formed Second Division for the 1903–04 season, and were promoted to its First Division in 1905. In 1909, Barrow moved to the Holker Street ground where they have played ever since. They won the Lancashire Combination title in 1920–21, and were invited to join the newly formed Third Division North of the Football League for 1921–22.

Barrow spent most of the 19 seasons before the Football League was suspended for the Second World War in the bottom half of the table. They finished bottom of the league four times, were re-elected each time, and had three consecutive top-half finishes in the early 1930s, the best of which, fifth place in 1931–32, remains the club's highest finishing position. When the regional third tier was reorganised into national Third and Fourth Divisions in 1958, Barrow were placed in the fourth tier. After one bottom-placed finish and three more in the re-election positions, Barrow finished third in the 1966–67 Fourth Division and gained promotion to the third tier. They finished eighth in their first season – their highest finish in the four-tier Football League – but were relegated two years later, finished bottom in 1970–71, but in 1971–72, at the eleventh time of asking, their application for re-election proved unsuccessful after a second vote. Their place was taken by Southern League runners-up Hereford United, who had received widespread attention during an FA Cup run that included their dramatic elimination of top-flight team Newcastle United in front of the television cameras.

Barrow struggled for seven seasons in the Northern Premier League (NPL) before joining the newly formed Alliance Premier League (APL), where they lasted four seasons before being relegated back to the NPL. They bounced straight back as 1983–84 title-winners, and yo-yoed between the two for the next 20 years, during which time the APL was renamed the Football Conference. They won further NPL titles in 1988–89 and 1997–98, and won their first national silverware, the FA Trophy, in the 1989–90 season, beating Leek Town 3–0 in the final they would win their second FA Trophy 20 years later, with an extra-time victory over Stevenage Borough. Barrow were expelled from the Conference in 1999 after financial mismanagement forced the club into liquidation. The NPL would not initially accept the reconstituted club as a member; it finally did so, under pressure from the Football Association, eight matches into the 1999–2000 season, and it took considerably longer for issues around the club's ownership to be resolved.

The non-league pyramid was restructured ahead of the 2004–05 season, and Barrow became founder members of the sixth-tier Conference North. After four seasons they were promoted via the play-offs to the Conference National, from which they were relegated after five years. Barrow won the 2014–15 Conference North title, and remained in the newly renamed National League until the 2019–20 season was initially suspended and then ended prematurely because of the COVID-19 pandemic, with Barrow four points clear at the top of the table. After protracted discussions, the clubs voted to decide the final tables on a points-per-game basis; Barrow's 70 points from 37 games made them champions, and returned them to the Football League after 48 years. They retained their status for the next two seasons, albeit with bottom-four finishes, before moving into mid-table in 2022–23.

== Key ==
Key to league record:

- P – Played
- W – Games won
- D – Games drawn
- L – Games lost
- F – Goals for
- A – Goals against
- Pts – Points
- Pos – Final position

Key to colours and symbols:
Symbol	Meaning
1st or W	Winners
2nd or F	Runners-up / losing finalists
↑	Promoted
↓	Relegated
♦	Top league scorer in Barrow's division

Key to divisions:

- Lancs Lge – Lancashire League
- Lancs C 1 – Lancashire Combination Division 1
- Lancs C 2 – Lancashire Combination Division 2
- Div 3N – Football League Third Division North
- Div 3 – Football League Third Division
- Div 4 – Football League Fourth Division
- League 2 – EFL League Two
- NPL – Northern Premier League
- NPL P – Northern Premier League Premier Division
- APL – Alliance Premier League
- Conf – Football Conference
- Conf Nat – Conference National
- Conf P – Conference Premier
- Conf N – Conference North
- Nat – National League

Key to rounds:

- Group – Group stage
- Prelim – Preliminary round
- QR1 – First qualifying round
- QR2 – Second qualifying round, etc.
- R1 – First round
- R2 – Second round, etc.
- QF – Quarter-final
- SF – Semi-final
- F – Final
- W – Winners
- (N) – Northern section of regionalised stage

Details of the abandoned 1939–40 Football League season are shown in italics and appropriately footnoted.

== Seasons ==
Season	League									FA Cup	League Cup	Other		Top league scorer(s)	
Season	Division	P	W	D	L	F	A	Pts	Pos	FA Cup	League Cup	Competition	Result	Name	Goals
1901–02	Lancs Lge	24	8	3	13	52	58	19	10th	QR4	—	—	—	Not known	—
1902–03	Lancs Lge	22	14	3	5	42	24	31	3rd	QR4	—	—	—	Not known	—
1903–04	Lancs C 2	34	12	9	13	51	54	33	9th	Prelim	—	—	—	Not known	—
1904–05	Lancs C 2 ↑	34	22	2	10	73	43	46	2nd	QR3	—	—	—	Not known	—
1905–06	Lancs C 1	38	14	7	17	75	78	35	16th	R1	—	—	—	Not known	—
1906–07	Lancs C 1	38	12	4	22	73	95	28	16th	QR3	—	—	—	Not known	—
1907–08	Lancs C 1 ↓	38	8	7	23	55	102	23	20th	QR1	—	—	—	Not known	—
1908–09	Lancs C 2	38	18	4	16	80	85	40	9th	QR2	—	—	—	Not known	—
1909–10	Lancs C 2	38	12	8	18	60	78	32	15th	QR2	—	—	—	Not known	—
1910–11	Lancs C 2 ↑	38	27	2	9	102	47	56	2nd	QR4	—	—	—	Not known	—
1911–12	Lancs C 1	32	15	9	8	66	48	39	4th	QR5	—	—	—	Not known	—
1912–13	Lancs C 1	34	17	6	11	73	34	40	5th	R1	—	—	—	Not known	—
1913–14	Lancs C 1	34	21	5	8	92	39	47	2nd	QR5	—	—	—	Not known	—
1914–15	Lancs C 1	32	11	6	15	59	89	28	13th	QR5	—	—	—	Not known	—
1915–19	The Football League and FA Cup were suspended until after the First World War.														
1919–20	Lancs C	34	20	3	11	58	37	43	5th	QR4	—	—	—	Not known	—
1920–21	Lancs C	34	23	6	5	79	28	52	1st	QR4	—	—	—	Not known	—
1921–22	Div 3N	38	14	5	19	42	54	33	15th	QR4	—	—	—	Bernard Sharkey	14
1922–23	Div 3N	38	13	4	21	50	60	30	18th	QR6	—	—	—	Billy Kellock	12
1923–24	Div 3N	42	8	9	25	35	80	25	22nd	QR4	—	—	—	Arthur Ormston	10
1924–25	Div 3N	42	16	7	19	51	74	39	14th	R1	—	—	—	Charlie Vowles	13
1925–26	Div 3N	42	7	4	31	50	98	18	22nd	R1	—	—	—	Jim Skillen	14
1926–27	Div 3N	42	7	8	27	34	117	22	22nd	R1	—	—	—	Alex Bosomworth	6
1927–28	Div 3N	42	10	11	21	54	102	31	19th	QR4	—	—	—	Alf Agar; Davie Brown; Elias MacDonald; Jacob Parsons; Billy Smith	7
1928–29	Div 3N	42	10	8	24	64	93	28	20th	R2	—	—	—	Fred Ferrari	14
1929–30	Div 3N	42	11	5	26	41	98	27	22nd	R2	—	—	—	Bobby Rock	11
1930–31	Div 3N	42	15	7	20	68	89	37	16th	R1	—	—	—	Billy Millar	25
1931–32	Div 3N	40	24	1	15	86	59	49	5th	R1	—	—	—	Billy Millar	30
1932–33	Div 3N	42	18	7	17	60	60	43	9th	R1	—	—	—	Joe Brain	17
1933–34	Div 3N	42	19	9	14	116	94	47	8th	R2	—	Third Division North Cup	R1	Jimmy Shankly	38
1934–35	Div 3N	42	13	9	20	58	87	35	17th	R2	—	Third Division North Cup	R1	Matt Robinson	11
1935–36	Div 3N	42	13	12	17	58	65	38	15th	R2	—	Third Division North Cup	QF	Tommy Reid	17
1936–37	Div 3N	42	13	10	19	70	86	36	16th	R1	—	Third Division North Cup	R1	Willie Ouchterlonie	22
1937–38	Div 3N	42	11	10	21	41	71	32	21st	R1	—	Third Division North Cup	QF	Richard McIntosh	9
1938–39	Div 3N	42	16	9	17	66	65	41	13th	R1	—	Third Division North Cup	QF	Tom Harris	24
1939–40	Div 3N	3	0	2	1	4	5	2	(Note: The 1939–40 season was abandoned with three matches played when the Second World War began.)	—	—	—	—	Jimmy Cargill; William Chalmers; Tom Harris; Dan Samuel	1
1939–45	The Football League and FA Cup were suspended until after the Second World War.														
1945–46	—	—	—	—	—	—	—	—	—	R3 (Note: Although the Football League did not resume until the 1946–47 season, the FA Cup was contested in 1945–46. From the first round proper to the sixth round (quarter-final), results were determined on aggregate score over two legs.)	—	—	—	—	—
1946–47	Div 3N	42	17	7	18	54	62	41	9th	R1	—	—	—	Alf Burnett	13
1947–48	Div 3N	42	16	13	13	49	40	45	7th	R3	—	—	—	Jimmy Kendall; Eddie Miller	12
1948–49	Div 3N	42	14	12	16	41	48	40	13th	R2	—	—	—	Alf Burnett	10
1949–50	Div 3N	42	14	9	19	47	53	37	15th	R1	—	—	—	George King	12
1950–51	Div 3N	46	16	6	24	51	76	38	19th	R1	—	—	—	George King	19
1951–52	Div 3N	46	17	12	17	57	61	46	12th	R1	—	—	—	Billy Gordon	15
1952–53	Div 3N	46	16	12	18	66	71	44	19th	R2	—	—	—	Billy Gordon	19
1953–54	Div 3N	46	16	12	18	72	71	44	12th	R3	—	—	—	Andy McLaren	20
1954–55	Div 3N	46	17	6	23	70	89	40	17th	R1	—	—	—	Billy Gordon	18
1955–56	Div 3N	46	12	9	25	61	83	33	22nd	R3	—	—	—	Billy Gordon	19
1956–57	Div 3N	46	21	9	16	76	62	51	10th	R2	—	—	—	Billy Gordon	27
1957–58	Div 3N	46	13	15	18	66	74	41	18th	R1	—	—	—	Brian Birch	20
1958–59	Div 4 (Note: Barrow were placed in the Fourth Division when the regional sections of the Third Division were amalgamated into national third- and fourth-tier divisions.)	46	9	10	27	51	104	28	23rd	R3	—	—	—	Jackie Robertson	12
1959–60	Div 4	46	15	11	20	77	87	41	18th	R1	—	—	—	Bobby Murdoch; Jackie Robertson	17
1960–61	Div 4	46	13	11	22	52	79	37	22nd	R1	R1 (Note: The League Cup competition started in the 1960–61 season.)	—	—	Barry Lowes	13
1961–62	Div 4	44	17	14	13	74	58	48	9th	R1	R1	—	—	John Kemp	15
1962–63	Div 4	46	19	12	15	82	80	50	9th	R2	R3	—	—	Tommy Dixon	16
1963–64	Div 4	46	6	18	22	51	93	30	17th	R3	R1	—	—	Ernie Ackerley; Tommy Thompson	10
1964–65	Div 4	46	12	6	28	59	105	30	24th	R1	R1	—	—	Bobby Tait	14
1965–66	Div 4	46	16	15	15	72	76	47	13th	R1	R1	—	—	Jimmy Mulholland; Bobby Tait	15
1966–67	Div 4 ↑	46	24	11	11	76	54	59	3rd	R3	R2	—	—	Jimmy Mulholland	18
1967–68	Div 3	46	21	8	17	65	54	50	8th	R3	R3	—	—	David Storf	16
1968–69	Div 3	46	17	8	21	56	75	42	19th	R2	R1	—	—	Jimmy Mulvaney	16
1969–70	Div 3 ↓	46	8	14	24	46	81	30	23rd	R2	R2	—	—	Jimmy Mulvaney	11
1970–71	Div 4	46	7	8	31	51	90	22	24th	R1	R1	—	—	Eddie Garbett	14
1971–72	Div 4 ↓	46	13	11	22	40	71	37	22nd (Note: Barrow failed to be re-elected to the League, losing out to Southern League runners-up Hereford United.)	R1	R1	—	—	Mick Hollis	10
1972–73	NPL	46	12	6	28	52	101	30	23rd	QR4	—	FA Trophy	R2	Not known	—
1973–74	NPL	46	13	7	26	46	94	33	22nd	QR1	—	FA Trophy	R2	Not known	—
1974–75	NPL	46	9	15	22	45	72	33	22nd	QR1	—	FA Trophy	R1	Not known	—
1975–76	NPL	46	12	9	25	47	84	33	23rd	Prelim	—	FA Trophy	R1	Not known	—
1976–77	NPL	44	14	12	20	58	61	40	21st	R1	—	FA Trophy	QR3	Not known	—
1977–78	NPL	46	14	12	20	58	61	40	18th	QR1	—	FA Trophy	QR3	Not known	—
1978–79	NPL	46	14	12	20	58	60	40	17th	QR2	—	FA Trophy	R2	Not known	—
1979–80	APL	38	14	6	18	47	55	34	14th (Note: Barrow were one of seven Northern Premier League clubs to join the newly formed Alliance Premier League.)	Prelim	—	FA Trophy	QF	Colin Cowperthwaite	12
1980–81	APL	38	15	8	15	50	49	38	9th	QR3	—	FA Trophy	R1	Colin Cowperthwaite	15
1981–82	APL	42	18	11	13	59	50	65 (Note: The 1981–82 season saw the introduction of three points for a win instead of two.)	8th	QR1	—	FA Trophy	R1	Colin Cowperthwaite	16
1982–83	APL ↓	42	8	12	22	46	74	36	21st	QR4	—	FA Trophy	R3	Colin Cowperthwaite	12
1983–84	NPL ↑	42	29	10	3	92	38	97	1st	QR1	—	FA Trophy	R2	Not known	—
1984–85	APL	42	11	16	15	47	57	43 (Note: From 1983–84 to 1985–86, the Alliance Premier League experimented with a system that awarded two points for a home win and three for an away win, before reverting to three points for any game won.)	18th	QR2	—	FA Trophy	R1	Colin Cowperthwaite	13
1985–86	APL ↓	46	7	8	27	41	86	24	22nd	QR1	—	FA Trophy	R1	Colin Cowperthwaite	15
1986–87	NPL	42	15	7	20	42	57	52	15th	QR1	—	FA Trophy	R1	Not known	—
1987–88	NPL P	42	21	8	13	70	41	71	5th	QR4	—	FA Trophy	SF	Not known	—
1988–89	NPL P ↑	42	26	9	7	69	35	87	1st	R1	—	FA Trophy	R3	Not known	—
1989–90	Conf	42	12	16	14	51	67	52	14th	QR3	—	FA Trophy; Conference League Cup	W (Note: Beat Leek Town 3–0 to win their first trophy at national level.); R2	Colin Cowperthwaite	12
1990–91	Conf	42	15	12	15	59	65	57	2nd	R3	—	FA Trophy	R2	Colin Cowperthwaite	18
1991–92	Conf ↓	42	8	14	20	52	72	38	22nd	QR4	—	FA Trophy	R2	John Brady	11
1992–93	NPL P	42	18	11	13	71	55	65	8th	QR4	—	FA Trophy	R1	Not known	—
1993–94	NPL P	42	18	10	14	59	51	64	8th	QR3	—	FA Trophy	QR3	Not known	—
1994–95	NPL P	42	17	5	20	68	71	56	11th	QR3	—	FA Trophy	QR3	Not known	—
1995–96	NPL P	42	20	13	9	69	42	73	4th	R2	—	FA Trophy	QR2	Not known	—
1996–97	NPL P	44	23	11	10	71	45	80	5th	QR4	—	FA Trophy	QR3	Neil Morton	22
1997–98	NPL P ↑	42	25	8	9	61	29	83	1st	QR1	—	FA Trophy	QF	Neil Morton	13
1998–99	Conf ↓	42	11	10	21	40	63	43	19th (Note: Expelled from Conference following liquidation.)	QR3	—	FA Trophy	R2	Andy Mutch	8
1999–2000	NPL P	44	14	15	15	65	59	57	13th	QR2	—	FA Trophy	R2	Nicky Peverell	19
2000–01	NPL P	44	21	9	14	83	63	72	6th	R1	—	FA Trophy	R1	Not known	—
2001–02	NPL P	44	19	10	15	75	59	67	8th	R1	—	FA Trophy	R2	Not known	—
2002–03	NPL P	44	24	12	8	84	52	84	2nd	R2	—	FA Trophy	R3	Not known	—
2003–04	NPL P	44	22	14	8	82	52	80	3rd (Note: After the non-league pyamid was restructured, Barrow became founder members of the new sixth-tier Conference North.)	QR3	—	FA Trophy	R3	Not known	—
2004–05	Conf N	42	14	10	18	50	64	52	16th	QR2	—	FA Trophy	R4	Not known	—
2005–06	Conf N	42	12	11	19	62	67	47	14th	QR4	—	FA Trophy	R2	Not known	—
2006–07	Conf N	42	12	14	16	47	48	50	16th	R1	—	FA Trophy	R1	Not known	—
2007–08	Conf N ↑	42	21	13	18	70	39	76	5th (Note: Beat A.F.C. Telford United in the semi-finals before beating Stalybridge Celtic 1–0 in the final to gain promotion to the Conference National via the play-offs.)	R1	—	FA Trophy; Conference League Cup	QR3; R4	Matt Henney	14
2008–09	Conf Nat	46	12	15	19	51	65	51	20th	R3	—	FA Trophy	R2	Jason Walker	11
2009–10	Conf Nat	44	13	13	18	50	67	52	15th	R3	—	FA Trophy	W (Note: Beat Stevenage Borough 2–1 after extra time to win their second FA Trophy.)	Jason Walker	14
2010–11	Conf Nat	46	12	14	20	52	67	50	18th	QR4	—	FA Trophy	R1	Jason Walker	11
2011–12	Conf Nat	46	17	9	20	62	76	60	13th	R1	—	FA Trophy	R2	Andy Cook	17
2012–13	Conf P ↓	46	11	13	22	45	83	46	22nd	R2	—	FA Trophy	QF	Adam Boyes	13
2013–14	Conf N	42	14	14	14	50	56	56	11th	QR4	—	FA Trophy	R2	Nicky Rushton	11
2014–15	Conf N ↑	42	26	9	7	81	43	87	1st	QR2	—	FA Trophy	QR3	Andy Cook	23
2015–16	Nat	46	17	14	15	64	71	65	11th	QR4	—	FA Trophy	R2	Andy Cook	24
2016–17	Nat	46	20	15	11	72	53	75	7th	R3	—	FA Trophy	QF	Byron Harrison	19
2017–18	Nat	46	11	16	19	51	63	49	20th	QR4	—	FA Trophy	R2	Byron Harrison	8
2018–19	Nat	46	17	13	16	52	51	64	10th	QR4	—	FA Trophy	R1	Jack Hindle	12
2019–20	Nat ↑	37	21	7	9	68	79	70	1st (Note: The 2019–20 football season was disrupted by the effects of the COVID-19 pandemic. The National League was suspended in mid-March 2020 and the clubs voted six weeks later to end the regular season programme. As teams had not all played the same number of matches, it was agreed to construct final league tables on an unweighted points per game basis. Barrow's 70 points from 37 games made them champions and returned them to the Football League after 48 years.)	QR4	—	FA Trophy	R3	Scott Quigley	20
2020–21	League 2	46	13	11	22	53	59	50	21st	R1	R1	EFL Trophy	Group	Scott Quigley	15
2021–22	League 2	46	10	14	22	44	57	44	22nd	R3	R2	EFL Trophy	Group	Ollie Banks	9
2022–23	League 2	46	18	8	20	47	53	62	9th	R1	R2	EFL Trophy	R2 (N)	Josh Gordon	15
2023–24	League 2	46	18	15	13	62	56	69	8th	R2	R1	EFL Trophy	Group	Kian Spence	9
2024–25	League 2	46	15	14	17	52	50	59	16th	R1	R3	EFL Trophy	Group	Emile Acquah	6
2025–26	League 2 ↓	46	9	9	28	45	78	36	24th	R2	R1	EFL Trophy	Group	Josh Gordon	9
