= George Duncan =

George Duncan may refer to:

- George Duncan (biblical scholar) (1884–1965), Scottish New Testament scholar and church Moderator
- George Duncan (golfer) (1883–1964), Scottish golfer
- George Duncan (lecturer) (1930–1972), Australian law lecturer
- George Duncan (painter) (1904–1974), Australian artist
- George Duncan (politician) (1791–1878), Scottish member of parliament
- George Alexander Duncan (1902–2006), Irish economist and academic
- George B. Duncan (1861–1950), officer in the United States Army
- George Baillie Duncan (1912–1997), preacher and Keswick Convention speaker
- George Smith Duncan (1852–1930), tramway and mining engineer
- Dr George Duncan (1930–1972), law lecturer, whose murder led to decriminalization of homosexuality in South Australia
- George Duncan (footballer) (1937–2012), Scottish footballer
- George Chamberlain Duncan, United States Navy officer

== See also ==
- George Duncan Beechey (1798–1852), portrait painter
- George Duncan Ludlow (1734–1808), lawyer
