= Godbold =

Godbold is a surname. Notable people with the surname include:

- Cathy Godbold (1974–2018), Australian actress
- Daryl Godbold (born 1964), English former professional footballer
- Edgar Godbold (1879–1952), American educator, 4th president of Southern Baptist-affiliated Louisiana College in Pineville, Louisiana, United States
- Harry Godbold (born 1939), English former professional footballer
- Jake Godbold (1933–2020), American politician
- John Cooper Godbold (1920–2009), Circuit Judge for the United States Court of Appeals
- John Godbolt or Godbold (1582–1648), English judge and politician who sat in the House of Commons in 1640
- Lucile Godbold (1900–1981), American athlete
- Mary Lou Godbold (1912–2008), American politician and educator
