= Joe Pritchard =

Joe Prichard may refer to:

- Joe Pritchard (American football) (1886–1947), played for the Vanderbilt Commodores
- Joe Pritchard (footballer, born 1943), English footballer for Tranmere Rovers
- Joe Pritchard (footballer, born 1996), English footballer for Oldham Athletic
- Joe Pritchard, a character from British TV series Shameless

== See also ==
- Joel Pritchard (1925–1997), American politician
