= Steve Melledew =

English footballer

Personal information
- Full name: Stephen Thomas Melledew
- Date of birth: 28 November 1945 (age 80)
- Place of birth: Rochdale, England
- Height: 5 ft 8 in (1.73 m)
- Positions: Forward; midfielder

Senior career*
Years	Team	Apps	(Gls)
–1966	Whipp & Bourne		
1966–1969	Rochdale	97	(23)
1969–1971	Everton	0	(0)
1971–1973	Aldershot	92	(27)
1973–1974	Bury	20	(2)
1974–1976	Crewe Alexandra	56	(2)
1975	→ Boston Minutemen (loan)	22	(6)
- Hillingdon Borough

Managerial career
- –2002: Thatcham Town (youth team)
- 2002–2004: Thatcham Town
- –2009: Newbury
- Abingdon United
- 2011–2012: Newbury
- * Club domestic league appearances and goals

Stephen Thomas Melledew (born 28 November 1945) is an English retired professional footballer who played as a forward and midfielder in the Football League, most notably for Rochdale and Aldershot. After his retirement as a player, he became a manager and coach in non-League football.

== Personal life ==
Melledew's son Thomas also became a footballer and played under his father's management in non-League football.

== Career statistics ==
Appearances and goals by club, season and competition
Club	Season	League			National Cup		League Cup		Other		Total	
Club	Season	Division	Apps	Goals	Apps	Goals	Apps	Goals	Apps	Goals	Apps	Goals
Rochdale	1966–67	Fourth Division	23	1	0	0	0	0	1 (Note: Appearances in Lancashire Senior Cup)	0	24	1
Rochdale	1967–68	Fourth Division	38	7	1	0	1	0	5 (Note: 3 appearances in Lancashire Senior Cup, 2 appearances and 1 goal in Northern Floodlit Cup)	1	45	8
Rochdale	1968–69	Fourth Division	31	12	2	0	1	1	2	0	36	13
Rochdale	1969–70	Third Division	5	3	—		1	0	—		6	4
Rochdale			97	23	3	0	3	1	8	1	111	25
Boston Minutemen (loan)	1975	North American Soccer League	22	6	—		—		—		22	6
Career total			119	29	3	0	3	1	8	1	133	31

== Honours ==
Rochdale

- Football League Fourth Division third-place promotion: 1968–69

Aldershot

- Football League Fourth Division fourth-place promotion: 1972–73

Bury

- Football League Fourth Division fourth-place promotion: 1973–74

Individual

- Aldershot Player of the Year: 1972–73
