= Dick Young (footballer) =

English footballer (1939–1988)

Personal information
- Full name: Richard Young
- Date of birth: 13 July 1939
- Place of birth: Felling, England
- Date of death: 1989 (aged 49–50)
- Height: 5 ft 10 in (1.78 m)
- Position: Forward

Senior career*
Years	Team	Apps	(Gls)
1956–1957	Usworth Juniors		
1957–1961	Newcastle United	0	(0)
1961–1962	South Shields		
1962–1965	Grimsby Town	33	(13)
1965–1966	Stockport County	27	(5)
1966–1967	Ellesmere Port Town		
1967–196?	Macclesfield Town	95	(63)
- * Club domestic league appearances and goals

Richard Young (13 July 1939 – 1988) was an English professional footballer who played as a forward.
