= Alan King (footballer) =

English footballer (born 1945)

Personal information
- Date of birth: January 18, 1945 (age 81)
- Place of birth: Birkenhead, England
- Position: Left half

Senior career*
Years	Team	Apps	(Gls)
1962–72	Tranmere Rovers	341	(35)
1972–	Ellesmere Port		
- Runcorn
- Bangor City
- Marine
- * Club domestic league appearances and goals

Alan King (born 18 January 1945) is an English footballer who played as a left half for Tranmere Rovers, Ellesmere Port, Runcorn, Bangor City and Marine. He made 385 appearances for Tranmere, and 341 in the Football League, scoring 38 goals.

King is currently a matchday host for Tranmere.

On 22nd April 2023, King was a pre match host for Tranmere Rovers vs Grimsby Town.
