= Don Watson (English footballer) =

English footballer (1932–2018)

Personal information
- Full name: Donald Watson
- Date of birth: 27 August 1932
- Place of birth: Barnsley, England
- Date of death: June 2018 (aged 85)
- Place of death: Barnsley, England
- Position: Inside forward

Senior career*
Years	Team	Apps	(Gls)
1953	Worsborough Bridge Miners Welfare		
1955-1956	Sheffield Wednesday	8	(3)
1956-1957	Lincoln City	14	(2)
1957-1961	Bury	172	(65)
1962	Barnsley	8	(1)
1962-1964	Rochdale	58	(15)
1964-1965	Barrow	17	(1)
1966	Buxton		
Total		277	(87)
- * Club domestic league appearances and goals

Don Watson (27 August 1932 – June 2018) was an English professional footballer who played for several clubs in the north of England.

== Career statistics ==
Appearances and goals by club, season and competition
Club	Season	League			FA Cup		League Cup		Total	
Club	Season	Division	Apps	Goals	Apps	Goals	Apps	Goals	Apps	Goals
Sheffield Wednesday	1954–55	First Division	5	1	2	1	0	0	7	0
Sheffield Wednesday	1956–57	First Division	3	2	0	0	0	0	3	2
Sheffield Wednesday	Total		8	3	2	1	0	0	10	2
Lincoln City	1956–57	Second Division	12	2	2	1	0	0	14	3
Lincoln City	1957–58	Second Division	2	0	0	0	0	0	2	0
Lincoln City	Total		14	2	2	1	0	0	16	3
Bury	1957–58	Third Division North	28	13	0	0	0	0	23	0
Bury	1958–59	Third Division	36	13	4	1	0	0	40	14
Bury	1959–60	Third Division	39	11	4	3	0	0	43	14
Bury	1960–61	Third Division	46	23	1	0	2	0	49	23
Bury	1961–62	Second Division	23	5	0	0	1	0	24	5
Bury	Total		172	65	9	4	3	0	179	56
Barnsley	1961–62	Third Division	8	1	0	0	0	0	8	1
Rochdale	1962–63	Fourth Division	33	8	2	0	2	1	37	9
Rochdale	1963–64	Fourth Division	25	7	2	1	0	0	27	8
Rochdale	Total		58	15	4	1	2	1	64	17
Barrow	1964–65	Fourth Division	17	1	3	0	1	1	21	2
Career total			277	87	20	7	6	2	298	81
