= Colin Cowperthwaite =

English footballer

Personal information
- Date of birth: 16 April 1959 (age 67)
- Place of birth: Flookburgh, Lancashire, England

Senior career*
Years	Team	Apps	(Gls)
1977–1992	Barrow	704	(282)
- * Club domestic league appearances and goals

Colin Cowperthwaite (born 16 April 1959) is an English former semi-professional footballer. He is best known as the overall top scorer and record appearance holder for Barrow, a club he played for from December 1977 till December 1992, where he scored 282 goals in 704 league and cup games. He has been voted Barrow's all-time greatest player.

Cowperthwaite made his debut for Barrow in 1977 when the team were in the Northern Premier League, five years after they had been relegated from the football league. During his period at the club, he won two Northern Premier League titles, playing eight seasons in that league and nine in the Alliance Premier League. The biggest success in that period came in 1990 when Barrow beat Leek Town 3–0 in the FA Trophy final at Wembley, in which Cowperthwaite scored. When Cowperthwaite retired in 1992, his testimonial match was held against Manchester City. After retiring, he continued to be active in the local amateur football scene. He played for Cartmel in the North Lancashire and District Football League, later managing the team in two different spells. With Cartmel he played alongside a young Jason Walker, who grew up in the same village of Flookburgh as Cowperthwaite; like Cowperthwaite, Walker would go on to score for Barrow in an FA Trophy final at Wembley.

His 1979-goal after just 3.5 seconds straight from kick off in an away game against Kettering Town was at the time the fastest recorded in the English game, and is still the fastest in a national competition, though a faster goal has since been scored by Marc Burrows in a reserve match.

He is the father of Niall Cowperthwaite, who played in the Football League with Morecambe, and who also went on to play for Barrow.
