= Alf Burnett =

Scottish footballer

Personal information
- Full name: Alfred Price Burnett
- Date of birth: 23 July 1922
- Place of birth: Aberdeen, Scotland
- Date of death: February 1977 (aged 54)
- Place of death: Lincoln, England
- Position: Centre forward

Senior career*
Years	Team	Apps	(Gls)
1946	Dundee United	1	(0)
1946–1959	Barrow	87	(32)
1949–1950	Lincoln City	4	(1)
- * Club domestic league appearances and goals

Alfred Price Burnett (23 July 1922 – February 1977) was a Scottish footballer who played as a centre forward. Burnett began his career in the mid-1940s with Dundee United, featuring in just one match before heading south to join Barrow. At the end of the decade, Burnett had a brief spell with Lincoln City, but left the club in June 1950 after joining the police.

Burnett, who died in 1977, served in the Royal Air Force at Walney Island Airfield prior to playing for Barrow.
