= Allan York =

English footballer

Personal information
- Date of birth: 13 July 1941 (age 85)
- Place of birth: Newcastle upon Tyne, England
- Position: Left back

Youth career
- Walker Boys Club

Senior career*
Years	Team	Apps	(Gls)
	Newcastle United	0	(0)
- West Auckland Town
- Kibblesworth Colliery Welfare
- Gateshead
1965–1967	Bradford City	45	(2)
1967	Lincoln City	0	(0)
Total		45+	(2+)
- * Club domestic league appearances and goals

Allan York (born 13 July 1941) is an English former professional footballer who played as a left back.

== Career ==
Born in Newcastle upon Tyne, York spent his early career with Walker Boys Club, Newcastle United, West Auckland Town, Kibblesworth Colliery Welfare and Gateshead. He signed for Bradford City from Gateshead in February 1965. He made 45 league appearances for the club, scoring twice, before moving to Lincoln City in July 1967.

== Sources ==
- Frost, Terry (1988). Bradford City A Complete Record 1903-1988. Breedon Books Sport. ISBN 0-907969-38-0.
