= Dave Campbell (footballer, born 1947) =

Welsh footballer

Personal information
- Full name: David Campbell
- Date of birth: 18 February 1947
- Place of birth: Wrexham, Wales
- Date of death: 7 December 2013 (aged 66)
- Place of death: Wrexham, Wales
- Position: Winger

Youth career
- Wrexham

Senior career*
Years	Team	Apps	(Gls)
1965–1967	Wrexham	43	(7)
- Corby Town
- * Club domestic league appearances and goals

David Campbell (18 February 1947 – 7 December 2013) was a Welsh professional footballer who played as a winger. He made appearances in the English Football League for Wrexham.
