= Mel Slack =

English footballer

Personal information
- Full name: Melvyn Slack
- Date of birth: 7 March 1944
- Place of birth: Gurney Valley, Bishop Auckland, England
- Date of death: 6 August 2016 (aged 72)
- Position: Midfielder

Senior career*
Years	Team	Apps	(Gls)
- Bishop Auckland
1964–1965	Sunderland	2	(1)
1965–1969	Southend United	111	(5)
1970–1971	Cambridge United	35	(0)
- Cambridge City
- * Club domestic league appearances and goals

Melvyn Slack (7 March 1944 – 6 August 2016) was an English footballer who played in the English Football League for Cambridge United, Southend United, and Sunderland.
