= Mike Addy =

English footballer

Personal information
- Full name: Michael Addy
- Date of birth: 20 February 1943 (age 83)
- Place of birth: Knottingley, England
- Position: Midfielder

Senior career*
Years	Team	Apps	(Gls)
1961–1964	Leeds United	2	(0)
1964–1967	Barnsley	51	(5)
1967–1968	Corby Town		
1970–1971	Kettering Town		
- * Club domestic league appearances and goals

Michael Addy (born 20 February 1943) is an English former professional footballer who played in the Football League as a wing half.
