= Tony Thear =

English footballer

Personal information
- Full name: Anthony Charles Thear
- Date of birth: 4 February 1948 (age 78)
- Place of birth: Edmonton, London, England
- Position: Forward

Senior career*
Years	Team	Apps	(Gls)
1965–1966	Arsenal	0	(0)
1966–1967	Luton Town	13	(5)
1967	Gillingham	7	(1)
Total		20	(6)
- * Club domestic league appearances and goals

Anthony Charles Thear (born 4 February 1948) is an English former professional footballer of the late 1960s. He played professionally for Arsenal, Luton Town and Gillingham and made a total of 20 appearances in the Football League.
