= Alex Bosomworth =

English footballer (1904–1987)

Personal information
- Full name: Alexander Charles Bosomworth
- Date of birth: 22 September 1904
- Place of birth: Coatham, England
- Date of death: 22 November 1987 (aged 83)
- Place of death: Bexley, England
- Height: 5 ft 10 in (1.78 m)
- Position: Inside forward

Senior career*
Years	Team	Apps	(Gls)
19??–1922	Eston Juniors		
1922	Redcar		
1923–1924	Middlesbrough	0	(0)
1924–1926	Darlington	8	(0)
1926–1927	Barrow	35	(6)
1927–1928	Bradford (Park Avenue)	0	(0)
- Grantham
- Woolwich Borough Council Athletic
- * Club domestic league appearances and goals

Alexander Charles Bosomworth (22 September 1904 – 22 November 1987) was an English footballer who made 43 appearances in the Football League for Darlington and Barrow, playing mainly as an inside forward. He was also on the books of Middlesbrough and Bradford (Park Avenue) without playing first-team football for either.

== Life and career ==
Bosomworth was born in 1904 in Coatham, Redcar, which was at the time in the North Riding of Yorkshire. The 1911 Census records him as the fourth of seven children living in Coatham with their parents, Thomas Frank Bosomworth, a blast furnace gantryman, and his wife Mary Agnes.

He played football for Eston Juniors and for Redcar before signing professional forms with First Division club Middlesbrough in January 1923. His services were retained for the following season, but not used by the first team, and he moved on to Darlington. He scored freely for their reserve team in the North-Eastern League, and finally made his Football League debut on Christmas Day 1924, standing in for regular inside-left George Stevens at home to Durham City; the match ended goalless. That was his only senior appearance that season as Darlington won the Third Division North title and gained promotion to the Second Division. He made seven appearances at the higher level, but was not retained, and signed for another Northern Section club, Barrow, in July 1926.

For the first time in his senior career, Bosomworth became a first-team regular. He made 35 league appearances, and scored his first senior goal on 9 October 1926 in a draw with Durham City – the week after missing a penalty. Although primarily an inside right, the Derby Daily Telegraph described him as "one of the most versatile players in the Northern Section to-day", having occupied seven different playing positions – both inside forward positions, centre forward, all three half-back positions and left full back – by halfway through the campaign. He finished the season with six league goals and two in the FA Cup, which made him Barrow's top scorer as they finished bottom of the division. Bosomworth signed for another Third Division club, Bradford Park Avenue, but made no first-team appearances.

He returned to his native Redcar, where he played club cricket. He married Nora Rogerson in 1932, and moved to London, where he worked for Woolwich Borough Council and played for their football team, Woolwich B.C. Athletic, and cricket team. The 1939 Register finds him living in Rochester Way, Woolwich, employed as a porter at the Town Hall, and serving as an ARP warden. He died in Bexley in 1987 at the age of 83.
