= Eric Barnes (footballer) =

English footballer

Personal information
- Date of birth: 29 November 1937
- Place of birth: Wythenshawe, England
- Date of death: 3 January 2014 (aged 76)
- Height: 6 ft 1 in (1.85 m)
- Position: Centre-half

Senior career*
| Years | Team | Apps | (Gls) |
| 1957–1970 | Crewe Alexandra | 354 | (1) |
- Witton Albion
- * Club domestic league appearances and goals

Eric Barnes (29 November 1937 – 3 January 2014) was an English professional footballer who played for Crewe Alexandra between 1957 and 1970.

Barnes joined Crewe initially as an amateur while doing his National Service in the Royal Air Force. He played mainly as a centre half, but also had a spell at full back after Crewe signed Dave Ewing from Manchester City. He moved into non-league football with Witton Albion in 1970.

== Honours ==
with Crewe Alexandra

- Football League Fourth Division fourth-place promotion: 1967–68
