= Les Campbell =

English footballer (1935–2019)

Personal information
- Date of birth: 26 July 1935
- Place of birth: Wigan, England
- Date of death: 10 November 2019 (aged 84)
- Position: Left wing

Senior career*
Years	Team	Apps	(Gls)
1952–1953	Wigan Athletic	5	(0)
1953–1960	Preston North End	64	(6)
1960–1961	Blackpool	11	(0)
1961–1964	Tranmere Rovers	102	(9)
1964–1965	Wigan Athletic	41	(2)
1965–1968	Altrincham	84	(10)
- Netherfield
- * Club domestic league appearances and goals

Les Campbell (26 July 1935 – 10 November 2019) was an English footballer who played on the left wing in The Football League for Preston North End, Blackpool and Tranmere Rovers.

Campbell started his career with Wigan Athletic, making five appearances in the Lancashire Combination before turning professional and joining Preston North End in 1953. He also played professionally for Blackpool and Tranmere Rovers before returning to Wigan Athletic (then in the Cheshire League) in 1964, where he made a further 41 appearances. In 1965, he signed for Altrincham where he made 84 league appearances in three seasons with the club (119 appearances in all competitions). He left the club at the end of the 1967–68 season and joined Netherfield.

Campbell died on 10 November 2019, aged 84.
