= John Manning (footballer) =

English footballer (1940–2021)

Personal information
- Full name: John Joseph Manning
- Date of birth: 11 December 1940
- Place of birth: Liverpool, England
- Date of death: 17 February 2021 (aged 80)
- Place of death: Liverpool, England
- Height: 5 ft 11 in (1.80 m)
- Position: Forward

Youth career
- 1960–1961: Liverpool
- 1961–1962: Tranmere Rovers

Senior career*
Years	Team	Apps	(Gls)
1962–1966	Tranmere Rovers	130	(70)
1966–1967	Shrewsbury Town	39	(18)
1967–1969	Norwich City	60	(21)
1969–1971	Bolton Wanderers	29	(7)
1971–1972	Walsall	14	(6)
1972	Tranmere Rovers	5	(1)
1972–1973	Crewe Alexandra	38	(6)
1973–1975	Barnsley	38	(6)
1975–1976	Crewe Alexandra	7	(5)
- Port Elizabeth City
Total		367	(141)
- * Club domestic league appearances and goals

John Joseph Manning (11 December 1940 – 17 February 2021) was an English footballer who played as a forward for numerous clubs between 1962 and 1976.

== Career ==
In the 1960–61 season, Manning played for a Liverpool youth team, before moving to Tranmere Rovers. Between 1962 and 1976, Manning played for Tranmere Rovers, Shrewsbury Town, Norwich City, Bolton Wanderers, Walsall, Crewe Alexandra, and Barnsley. In 1967, Manning signed for Norwich, for a fee of £21,000. and made 60 league appearances for them over two seasons, scoring 21 goals. Including other fixtures, he played 67 matches for Norwich, scoring 22 goals. In March 1969, Manning left Norwich City to join Bolton Wanderers, as he wanted to return to North West England to be closer to his family in Liverpool. He had two spells at Tranmere, where he scored over 70 goals, and also at Crewe. He also spent time playing in South Africa for Port Elizabeth City.

After retiring as a player, Manning was a coach for Crewe, before becoming a coach of the Saudi Arabia under-19s team, working with Jimmy Hill. He later worked as a scout for Birmingham City, Brighton & Hove Albion and Middlesbrough.

== Personal life and death ==
Manning was born on 11 December 1940 in Liverpool, England. Aside from football, he was a sales manager for a chemicals company.

In later life, Manning suffered from Alzheimer's disease. His death was announced on 17 February 2021, at the age of 80.
