= Brian Turner (footballer, born 1936) =

English footballer

Personal information
- Full name: Brian Turner
- Date of birth: 23 July 1936 (age 90)
- Place of birth: Salford, England
- Date of death: January 1999 (aged 62)
- Place of death: Southport, England
- Position: Wing half

Senior career*
Years	Team	Apps	(Gls)
1957–1970	Bury	454	(24)
1970–1971	Oldham Athletic	11	(0)
1971–1972	Droylsden		
Total		465	(24)
- * Club domestic league appearances and goals

Brian Turner (23 July 1936 – January 1999) was an English professional footballer who played as a wing half in the Football League. He made more than 450 appearances for Bury, and also appeared for Oldham Athletic.
