= George Sievwright =

Scottish footballer (1937–2025)

Personal information
- Full name: George Edgar Smollett Sievwright
- Date of birth: 10 September 1937
- Place of birth: Broughty Ferry, Scotland
- Date of death: 13 September 2025 (aged 88)
- Position: Wing half

Youth career
- Broughty Athletic

Senior career*
Years	Team	Apps	(Gls)
1961–1963	Dundee United	7	(0)
1963–1964	Oldham Athletic	37	(4)
1964–1965	Tranmere Rovers	0	(0)
1965–1966	Rochdale	32	(1)
1966–1972	Macclesfield Town	174	(8)
1972–1974	Mossley	2	(0)

Managerial career
- 1972–1974: Mossley
- Stalybridge Celtic
- * Club domestic league appearances and goals

George Edgar Smollett Sievwright (10 September 1937 – 13 September 2025) was a Scottish footballer who played as a wing half. Sievwright began his career with Dundee Junior club Broughty Athletic before going senior in the late 1950s with Dundee United. He played in seven league fixtures for United during the 1961–62 season and once during the following season. After leaving Tannadice in 1963, Sievwright joined Oldham Athletic in a £500 deal. He made 37 appearances and scored 4 goals before moving on to Tranmere Rovers. Appearing only in Tranmere's reserve team, Sievwright spent a season with Rochdale, where supporters found out about his release before he did. Subsequently, joining Macclesfield Town, Sievwright won the FA Trophy during his final playing years.

In November 1972, Sievwright moved into management, joining Mossley as player-manager. His time was brief, lasting little over a year before being dismissed in January 1974. He also had a spell managing Stalybridge Celtic.

Sievwright died on 13 September 2025, at the age of 88.

== Honours ==
Macclesfield Town

- FA Trophy: 1969–70
