= John Heath (footballer) =

English footballer (1936–2019)

Personal information
- Date of birth: 5 June 1936 (age 90)
- Place of birth: Heywood, England
- Date of death: 3 December 2019 (aged 83)
- Position: Goalkeeper

Youth career
- Blackburn Rovers

Senior career*
| Years | Team | Apps | (Gls) |
| 1956–1961 | Bury | 8 | (0) |
| 1961–1964 | Tranmere Rovers | 58 | (0) |
| 1964–1966 | Wigan Athletic | | |
| 1966–???? | Rochdale | 6 | (0) |
| Total | | 72 | (0) |
- * Club domestic league appearances and goals

John Heath (5 June 1936 – 3 December 2019) was an English footballer who played as a goalkeeper in the Football League for Bury, Tranmere Rovers and Rochdale.
