= Malcolm Devitt =

English footballer

Personal information
- Full name: Bernard Malcolm Devitt
- Date of birth: 26 January 1937
- Place of birth: Bradford, England
- Date of death: 12 February 2012 (aged 75)
- Place of death: Cyprus
- Position: Inside forward

Youth career
- 19xx–1958: Bradford Rovers

Senior career*
| Years | Team | Apps | (Gls) |
| 1958–1963 | Bradford City | 100 | (13) |
| 1963–1970 | Wisbech Town | 246 | (?) |
- * Club domestic league appearances and goals

Bernard Malcolm Devitt (26 January 1937 – 12 February 2012) was an English professional footballer who played as an inside forward.

== Career ==
Born in Bradford, Devitt began his career at Bradford Rovers, before turning professional in 1958 with Bradford City, making 100 appearances in the Football League over the next five years. He later played non-league football with Wisbech Town, and holds their Southern League match appearance record with 246 games, from a total of 385 first team appearances.

== Later life and death ==
Devitt retired to Cyprus, and died on 12 February 2012 aged 74 following a fall.
