= Albert Franks =

English footballer

Personal information
- Full name: Albert John Franks
- Date of birth: 13 April 1936
- Place of birth: Boldon Colliery, England
- Date of death: 18 June 2017 (aged 81)
- Position: Wing half

Senior career*
Years	Team	Apps	(Gls)
- Boldon Colliery Welfare
1956–1960	Newcastle United	72	(4)
1959–1960	Rangers	3	(0)
1961–1962	Greenock Morton	13	(2)
1961–1963	Lincoln City	58	(5)
1963–1964	Queen of the South	10	(2)
1964–1965	Scarborough		

Managerial career
- 1964–1965: Scarborough
- * Club domestic league appearances and goals

Albert John Franks (13 April 1936 – 18 June 2017) was an English footballer who played as a wing half. He played in the Football League for Newcastle United and Lincoln City in the Scottish Football League for Rangers, Greenock Morton and Queen of the South, and was player-manager of Scarborough.

== Early life ==
Albert Franks was born in the mining village of Boldon Colliery, County Durham on 13 April 1936. His mother was a Methodist preacher. He represented the Durham county schools teams at football and cricket, and once scored a century in 25 minutes playing for Boldon Colliery in the Durham Coast Cricket League. He was a police cadet before becoming a professional footballer.

== Playing career ==
Franks began his football career with Boldon Colliery Welfare, before signing for Newcastle United in December 1953. Although his Newcastle career was interrupted by his National Service, during which he captained the Royal Air Force football team, he went on to make 75 first team appearances and score 4 goals after making his debut against Luton Town in 1957. Having fallen out of favour once Charlie Mitten became Newcastle manager, Franks was sold to Rangers in March 1960 for £6,500, where he was thought to be the first Englishman to join the Scottish club.

Franks was named man of the match on his debut, in a 2–0 home defeat against Motherwell in April 1960, but made only two further first team appearances for Rangers. He joined Morton in September 1961 before another transfer, to Lincoln City, two months later. After a return to Scotland with Queen of the South in 1964, he ended his career as player-manager of Scarborough in the Midland League.

== After football ==
Franks retired from football aged 29, after a proposed move to become player-manager of Bradford City fell through. He returned to his police career, joining the Durham Constabulary. He served there for 22 years, principally with the CID in Chester-le-Street, earning 13 commendations. After retiring from the police force, he moved into retail security working internationally as a consultant and lived in Vigo, near Birtley, Tyne and Wear. Franks died on 18 June 2017, aged 81.
