= Johnny Price =

English footballer

Personal information
- Full name: John Price
- Date of birth: 25 October 1943
- Place of birth: Easington, England
- Date of death: 6 May 1995 (aged 51)
- Position: Winger

Senior career*
Years	Team	Apps	(Gls)
1960–1965	Burnley	21	(2)
1965–1971	Stockport County	246	(23)
1971–1974	Blackburn Rovers	76	(12)
1974–1976	Stockport County	66	(1)
- * Club domestic league appearances and goals

John "Johnny" Price (25 October 1943 – 1995) was an English professional footballer who played as a winger.
