= Alan Burton (footballer, born 1939) =

English footballer

Personal information
- Full name: Alan Richard Burton
- Date of birth: 11 January 1939 (age 87)
- Place of birth: Aldershot, England
- Position: Left winger

Senior career*
Years	Team	Apps	(Gls)
1958–1960	Wimbledon	34	(9)
1960	Alton Town	?	(?)
1960–1970	Aldershot	230	(47)
1970–1971	Wimbledon	17	(5)
- * Club domestic league appearances and goals

Alan Richard Burton (born 11 January 1939) is an English former professional footballer who played as a left winger in the Football League.
