= Peter Phoenix =

English footballer (1936–2020)

Personal information
- Full name: Peter Patrick Phoenix
- Date of birth: 31 December 1936
- Place of birth: Urmston, Lancashire, England
- Date of death: 14 April 2020 (aged 83)
- Position: Left winger

Senior career*
| Years | Team | Apps | (Gls) |
| 1953–1954 | Stretford Boys | | |
| 1954–1955 | Lostock Gralam | | |
| 1955–1956 | Manchester City | 0 | (0) |
| 1956–1957 | Stoke City | 0 | (0) |
| 1957 | Tamworth | | |
| 1957–1962 | Oldham Athletic | 161 | (27) |
| 1962–1963 | Rochdale | 36 | (4) |
| 1963–1964 | Exeter City | 15 | (1) |
| 1964 | Southport | 10 | (0) |
| 1964–1965 | Stockport County | 19 | (1) |
| 1965–1966 | Wigan Athletic | | |
| 1966–1967 | Bangor City | | |
| 1967–1968 | Witton Albion | | |
| 1968 | Massey Ferguson | | |
| Total | | 241 | (33) |
- * Club domestic league appearances and goals

Peter Patrick Phoenix (31 December 1936 – 14 April 2020) was an English footballer who played as a left winger in the Football League.

Phoenix began his playing career with Tamworth, before being spotted by Oldham Athletic, where he made his Football League debut in February 1958.

== Career statistics ==
Appearances and goals by club, season and competition
| Club | Season | League | | | FA Cup | | League Cup | | Total | |
| Club | Season | Division | Apps | Goals | Apps | Goals | Apps | Goals | Apps | Goals |
|---|---|---|---|---|---|---|---|---|---|---|
| Manchester City | 1955–56 | First Division | 0 | 0 | 0 | 0 | — | | 0 | 0 |
| Stoke City | 1956–57 | Second Division | 0 | 0 | 0 | 0 | — | | 0 | 0 |
| Oldham Athletic | 1957–58 | Third Division North | 6 | 0 | 0 | 0 | — | | 6 | 0 |
| Oldham Athletic | 1958–59 | Fourth Division | 40 | 13 | 3 | 1 | — | | 43 | 14 |
| Oldham Athletic | 1959–60 | Fourth Division | 32 | 3 | 1 | 1 | — | | 33 | 4 |
| Oldham Athletic | 1960–61 | Fourth Division | 44 | 6 | 3 | 1 | 2 | 0 | 49 | 7 |
| Oldham Athletic | 1961–62 | Fourth Division | 35 | 5 | 5 | 1 | 2 | 0 | 42 | 6 |
| Oldham Athletic | 1962–63 | Fourth Division | 4 | 0 | 0 | 0 | 2 | 0 | 6 | 0 |
| Oldham Athletic | Total | | 161 | 27 | 12 | 4 | 6 | 0 | 179 | 31 |
| Rochdale | 1962–63 | Fourth Division | 32 | 4 | 2 | 1 | 0 | 0 | 34 | 5 |
| Rochdale | 1963–64 | Fourth Division | 4 | 0 | 0 | 0 | 1 | 0 | 5 | 0 |
| Rochdale | Total | | 36 | 4 | 2 | 1 | 1 | 0 | 39 | 5 |
| Exeter City | 1963–64 | Fourth Division | 15 | 1 | 2 | 0 | 0 | 0 | 17 | 1 |
| Southport | 1963–64 | Fourth Division | 10 | 0 | 0 | 0 | 0 | 0 | 10 | 0 |
| Stockport County | 1964–65 | Fourth Division | 19 | 1 | 6 | 0 | 0 | 0 | 25 | 1 |
| Career total | | | 241 | 33 | 22 | 5 | 7 | 0 | 270 | 38 |
