= Brian Richardson (footballer) =

English footballer (1934–2020)

Brian Richardson (5 October 1934 – May 2020) was an English professional footballer with Sheffield United, Swindon Town and Rochdale.

Born in Sheffield on 5 October 1934, Richardson signed for Sheffield United in 1954, aged 20, and stayed for 12 years, playing in 291 League matches. He was a ball-winning half-back, often paired with the more creative Gerry Summers.

He went on to play for Swindon and Rochdale; on retiring as a player he became a sales executive.

Richardson died in Sheffield in May 2020, at the age of 85.
