= Derek Panter =

English footballer

Personal information
- Date of birth: 22 November 1943
- Place of birth: Blackpool, England
- Date of death: 13 August 2013 (aged 69)
- Place of death: Worsley, England
- Position: Inside forward

Youth career
- West Bromwich Albion

Senior career*
Years	Team	Apps	(Gls)
1963–1964	Manchester City	1	(0)
1964–1965	Torquay United	5	(1)
- Oswestry Town
1966–1967	Hyde United	41	(28)
Total		47	(29)
- * Club domestic league appearances and goals

Derek Panter was an English footballer, who played as an inside forward in the Football League for Manchester City and Torquay United.

He made a solitary appearance for Mossley after signing from Oswestry Town in the 1966–67 season before moving to Hyde United for the next two seasons.
