= Norman Gall (footballer) =

English footballer

Personal information
- Full name: Norman Albert Gall
- Date of birth: 30 September 1942 (age 84)
- Place of birth: Wallsend, England
- Height: 5 ft 9 in (1.75 m)
- Position: Defender

Senior career*
Years	Team	Apps	(Gls)
19??–1962	Gateshead		
1962–1974	Brighton & Hove Albion	440	(4)
1936–19??	Horsham		
- Eastbourne United
- Southwick
- * Club domestic league appearances and goals

Norman Albert Gall (born 30 September 1942) is an English former professional footballer who made more than 400 appearances in the Football League playing as a defender for Brighton & Hove Albion.

== Life and career ==
Gall was born in Wallsend, which was then in Northumberland. While completing a marine engineering apprenticeship, he played football as an amateur for Gateshead. In March 1962, he turned professional with Brighton & Hove Albion, about to be relegated to the Football League Third Division. He was initially unpopular because he had displaced captain Roy Jennings from the team, but soon established himself as first-choice centre half and was twice voted Albion's Player of the Season. Over 12 years with the club, he made 440 appearances in the Football League and 488 in all first-team competitions. Albion's long-serving goalkeeper Brian Powney said Gall "was the best player [he] ever played with because of his consistency over all the years."

After retiring from professional football, Gall remained in the Sussex area, playing non-League football for clubs including Horsham, Eastbourne United and Southwick and coaching at Worthing. He also acted as summariser on BBC Radio Sussex commentaries on Brighton matches.
