= Roger Barton (footballer) =

English footballer

Personal information
- Full name: David Roger Barton
- Date of birth: 25 September 1946
- Place of birth: Jump, Yorkshire, England
- Date of death: 4 November 2013 (aged 67)
- Place of death: Austerfield, Doncaster, South Yorkshire
- Position: Winger

Senior career*
Years	Team	Apps	(Gls)
196?–1965	Wolverhampton Wanderers	0	(0)
1965–1966	Lincoln City	28	(1)
1966–1970	Barnsley	55	(3)
1970–197?	Worcester City		
- * Club domestic league appearances and goals

David Roger Barton (25 September 1946 – 4 November 2013) was an English footballer who made 83 appearances in the Football League playing for Lincoln City and Barnsley. He represented England at under-18 level. He began his professional football career with Wolverhampton Wanderers, but left the club before appearing in the league, and after leaving Barnsley he played in the Southern League for Worcester City. He played as a winger.
