= Barrie Wheatley =

English footballer

Barrie Wheatley (born 21 February 1938) is an English former professional footballer who played for Crewe Alexandra and Rochdale.

== Career ==
Initially with Sandbach Ramblers and then Rode Heath F.C., Wheatley was signed by Liverpool in March 1956, but made no first team appearances. He joined Crewe Alexandra in July 1957. He made his Crewe debut, and scored his first Crewe goal, at Workington on 7 September 1957, eventually making 236 appearances as a forward and scoring 49 goals

His most memorable goal was on 7 January 1961 in the 1960-61 FA Cup 3rd Round, when he headed Fourth Division Crewe's winner in a shock 2–1 win against a then First Division Chelsea side including Jimmy Greaves, Peter Bonetti and Terry Venables.

He scored when Crewe beat Accrington Stanley 4–0 at Gresty Road on 2 March 1962, Accrington's final game before resigning from the Football League on 6 March 1962.

Wheatley signed for Rochdale in July 1966, making 13 appearances and scoring 4 goals. He later played for Witton Albion and Congleton Town.
