= Billy Russell (footballer, born 1935) =

English footballer (1935–2022)

Personal information
- Full name: William Russell
- Date of birth: 7 July 1935
- Place of birth: Hounslow, London, England
- Date of death: 10 November 2022 (aged 87)
- Height: 5 ft 8 in (1.73 m)
- Positions: Outside right; inside right

Senior career*
Years	Team	Apps	(Gls)
????–1957	Rhyl		
1957–1963	Sheffield United	144	(55)
1963–1966	Bolton Wanderers	22	(2)
1966–1968	Rochdale	61	(8)
1968–1969	Scarborough		
1970	Chorley		

International career
1957	England amateur	4	(0)
- * Club domestic league appearances and goals

William Russell (7 July 1935 – 10 November 2022) was an English footballer who played as an inside or outside right.

He began his career with Rhyl before playing top-flight football for Sheffield United. After leaving United he had spells at Bolton Wanderers, Rochdale, Scarborough and was playing for Chorley when forced to retire through injury. Initially playing as an amateur Russell was capped four times by the England amateur side before turning professional in 1957.

== Club career ==
Russell was playing as an amateur with Rhyl when he was spotted by Sheffield United manager Joe Mercer who duly signed him in August 1957 on similar amateur terms. After impressing in the reserve team, Russell was handed his full debut whilst still an amateur, scoring United's only goal in a 3–1 defeat by Charlton Athletic at the end of August.

Following his successful transition to league football Russell signed professional terms with Rhyl in November 1957, allowing them to claim a fee of £1,000 from United, plus the gate receipts from two games played between the two sides. Despite his new professional status, Russell continued as a part-time player, combining football with his teaching career.

Described locally as fast, with an accurate shot, he would work hard in midfield before breaking forward and creating opportunities for his teammates. After missing most of the 1959–60 season with a broken leg, Russell returned to the side the following year and enjoyed the best form of his career, scoring ten goals in eleven league games.

By 1963 Russell was less able to cope with the pace of the First Division and left United for Bolton Wanderers for a fee of £20,000. In 1966 he transferred to Rochdale, then dropped into non-league with Scarborough before finishing his career with Chorley where a broken leg sustained in a pre-season friendly forced him to retire.

== International career ==
After gaining prominence following his move to Sheffield United, Russell was capped on four occasions by England at amateur level in 1957.

== Personal life ==
Russell was born in Hounslow, London on 7 July 1935.

Russell's father Willie had played for Chelsea and Hearts and was manager of Rhyl during his time there. He trained as a teacher and was still studying at Loughborough when he was signed by Sheffield United. On completing his studies, Russell split his time between playing football and working as a technical high school teacher (Wythenshawe Technical High School), Stretford Grammar School for Boys (teaching German and later Russian), before eventually becoming Head of Languages at a college in Altrincham.

He died on 10 November 2022 at the age of 87.
