= Arthur Peat =

English footballer and manager

Personal information
- Full name: William Arthur Peat
- Date of birth: 1 September 1940
- Place of birth: Walton, England
- Date of death: 16 July 2012 (aged 71)
- Place of death: Southport, England
- Height: 5 ft 8 in (1.73 m)
- Position: Right half

Youth career
- 1959–1961: Everton

Senior career*
Years	Team	Apps	(Gls)
1961–1972	Southport	401	(27)
1972–1974	Crewe Alexandra	82	(5)

Managerial career
- 1969–1970: Southport (reserves)
- 1970: Southport (player-manager)
- * Club domestic league appearances and goals

William Arthur Peat (1 September 1940 – 16 July 2012) was an English professional footballer who made over 400 appearances as a right half in the Football League for Southport. He is Southport's record appearance-maker with 435 and also captained and managed the club.

== Career statistics ==
Appearances and goals by club, season and competition
Club	Season	League			FA Cup		League Cup		Other		Total	
Club	Season	Division	Apps	Goals	Apps	Goals	Apps	Goals	Apps	Goals	Apps	Goals
Southport	1961–62	Fourth Division	5	0	0	0	0	0	—		5	0
Southport	1962–63	Fourth Division	23	2	0	0	0	0	—		23	2
Southport	1963–64	Fourth Division	38	3	2	0	0	0	—		40	3
Southport	1964–65	Fourth Division	43	3	3	0	2	0	1 (Note: Appearance in Lancashire Senior Cup)	0	49	3
Southport	1965–66	Fourth Division	45	0	7	0	1	0	—		53	0
Southport	1966–67	Fourth Division	38	4	1	0	1	0	—		40	4
Southport	1967–68	Third Division	46	2	3	0	1	0	—		50	2
Southport	1968–69	Third Division	43	6	2	0	2	0	—		47	6
Southport	1969–70	Third Division	46	2	1	0	2	0	—		49	2
Southport	1970–71	Fourth Division	37	3	1	0	1	0	—		39	3
Southport	1971–72	Fourth Division	37	2	1	0	2	0	—		40	2
Career total			401	27	21	0	12	0	1	0	435	28
