= Bobby Tait =

Scottish footballer (1938–2024)

Personal information
- Full name: Robert James Tait
- Date of birth: 4 October 1938
- Place of birth: Edinburgh, Scotland
- Date of death: 2 May 2024 (aged 85)
- Place of death: Arnold, Nottinghamshire, England
- Height: 1.74 m (5 ft 9 in)
- Position: Inside forward

Senior career*
Years	Team	Apps	(Gls)
- Loanhead Mayflower
1960–1961	Aberdeen	2	(0)
1961–1962	Elgin City		
1962–1964	Notts County	60	(11)
1964–1966	Barrow	79	(27)
1966–1967	Chesterfield	28	(2)
1967–1968	Arnold		
Total		169	(40)
- * Club domestic league appearances and goals

Robert James Tait (4 October 1938 – 2 May 2024) was a Scottish professional footballer who played mainly in the Football League as an inside forward. Tait died in Arnold, Nottinghamshire on 2 May 2024, at the age of 85.
