= Joe Fletcher (footballer) =

English footballer

Personal information
- Full name: Joseph Michael Fletcher
- Date of birth: 25 September 1946
- Place of birth: Manchester, England
- Date of death: 14 June 2025 (aged 78)
- Position: Forward

Senior career*
Years	Team	Apps	(Gls)
1965–1967	Manchester City	0	(0)
1967–1969	Rochdale	57	(21)
1969	Grimsby Town	11	(1)
1969–1970	Barrow	8	(1)
1970–1971	Chorley		
1971–1972	Wigan Athletic		
1972–1975	Hakoah		
1975–1978	Mossley		
1978–19??	Macclesfield Town		
Total		76	(23)
- * Club domestic league appearances and goals

Joseph Michael Fletcher (25 September 1946 – 14 June 2025) was an English former professional footballer who played as a forward for Rochdale, Grimsby Town and Barrow. In the 1967–68 season, he was top goalscorer for Rochdale.
