= Jimmy Cuthbertson =

English footballer (born 1947)

Personal information
- Full name: James Cuthbertson
- Date of birth: 7 December 1947 (age 78)
- Place of birth: Silksworth, England
- Position: Inside forward

Senior career*
Years	Team	Apps	(Gls)
- Dawdon Colliery Welfare
1964–1968	Bradford City	28	(7)
- Thackley
- * Club domestic league appearances and goals

James Cuthbertson (born 7 December 1947) is an English former professional footballer who played as an inside forward.

== Career ==
Born in Silksworth, Cuthbertson played for Dawdon Colliery Welfare, Bradford City and Thackley. For Bradford City he made 28 appearances in the Football League, scoring 7 goals; he also made 1 appearance in the FA Cup.

== Sources ==
- Frost, Terry (1988). Bradford City A Complete Record 1903-1988. Breedon Books Sport. ISBN 0-907969-38-0.
