= 1972–73 Northern Premier League =

Northern Premier League
- Season: 1972–73
- Champions: Boston United
- Promoted: None
- Relegated: Ellesmere Port Town
- Matches: 552
- Goals: 1,503 (2.72 per match)
- Biggest home win: Stafford Rangers 7–0 Barrow (16 September 1972)
- Biggest away win: South Shields (2) 1–5 Lancaster City (30 December 1972); Barrow 0–4 Bradford Park Avenue (17 March 1973)
- Highest scoring: Great Harwood 6–3 Fleetwood (9 October 1972)
- Longest winning run: 7 matches Boston United (27 September 1972 – 21 October 1972)
- Longest unbeaten run: 32 matches Boston United (12 August 1972 – 24 February 1973)
- Longest winless run: 13 matches Lancaster City (27 December 1971 – 25 September 1972); Fleetwood (10 February 1973 – 4 May 1973)
- Longest losing run: 8 matches Matlock Town (2 September 1972 – 7 October 1972)

The 1972–73 Northern Premier League was the fifth season of the Northern Premier League, a regional football league in Northern England, the northern areas of the Midlands and North Wales. The season began on 12 August 1972 and concluded on 4 May 1973.

== Overview ==
The League featured twenty-four teams for the second consecutive season.

=== Team changes ===
The following two clubs left the League at the end of the previous season:

- Chorley resigned, demoted to Cheshire County League
- Kirkby Town relegated to Lancashire Combination

The following two clubs joined the League at the start of the season:

- Mossley promoted from Cheshire County League
- Barrow not re-elected to Football League Fourth Division

=== League table ===
Pos	Team	Pld	W	D	L	GF	GA	GR	Pts	Qualification or relegation
1	Boston United (C)	46	27	16	3	88	34	2.588	70	
2	Scarborough	46	26	9	11	72	39	1.846	61	
3	Wigan Athletic	46	23	14	9	69	38	1.816	60	
4	Altrincham	46	22	16	8	75	55	1.364	60	
5	Bradford Park Avenue	46	19	17	10	63	50	1.260	55	
6	Stafford Rangers	46	20	11	15	63	46	1.370	51	
7	Gainsborough Trinity	46	18	13	15	70	50	1.400	49	
8	Northwich Victoria	46	17	15	14	74	62	1.194	49	
9	Netherfield	46	20	9	17	68	65	1.046	49	
10	Macclesfield Town	46	16	16	14	58	47	1.234	48	
11	Ellesmere Port Town (R)	46	18	11	17	52	56	0.929	47	Relegated to Lancashire Combination
12	Skelmersdale United	46	15	16	15	58	59	0.983	46	
13	Bangor City	46	16	13	17	70	60	1.167	45	
14	Mossley	46	17	11	18	70	73	0.959	45	
15	Morecambe	46	17	11	18	62	70	0.886	45	
16	Great Harwood	46	14	15	17	63	74	0.851	43	
17	South Liverpool	46	12	19	15	47	57	0.825	43	
18	Runcorn	46	15	12	19	75	78	0.962	42	
19	Goole Town	46	13	13	20	64	73	0.877	39	
20	South Shields	46	17	4	25	64	81	0.790	38	
21	Matlock Town	46	11	11	24	42	80	0.525	33	
22	Lancaster City	46	10	11	25	53	78	0.679	31	
23	Barrow	46	12	6	28	52	101	0.515	30	
24	Fleetwood	46	5	15	26	31	77	0.403	25	

Updated to match(es) played on 4 May 1973. Source: The Football Archives
Rules for classification: 1) points; 2) goal average; 3) number of goals scored.

The system of using goal average to separate two teams tied on points was used up until the 1976–77 season.

The points system up until the 1982–83 season: 2 points for a win, 1 point for a draw and 0 points for losing.
(C) Champions; (R) Relegated

=== Results ===
Home \ Away	ALT	BAN	BRW	BOS	BPA	EPT	FLE	GAI	GOO	GHA	LNC	MAC	MAT	MOR	MOS	NET	NOR	RUN	SCA	SKU	SLI	SSH	STA	WIG
Altrincham		2–2	1–1	0–0	1–1	2–0	3–0	2–0	4–1	0–0	4–2	1–1	1–0	3–0	3–1	1–2	0–0	2–0	1–0	0–0	2–1	3–2	0–1	2–0
Bangor City	4–0		3–0	1–3	0–0	2–0	2–0	2–2	1–1	1–1	4–2	2–1	1–1	0–2	3–2	4–2	3–1	0–0	1–2	4–0	1–1	3–0	4–2	0–0
Barrow	1–2	2–0		1–1	0–4	1–2	3–2	1–1	2–4	0–3	3–1	0–2	4–1	0–1	1–0	0–1	3–0	0–0	2–3	3–0	2–1	1–2	2–0	0–1
Boston United	4–1	4–3	5–1		3–0	2–2	4–0	1–1	3–0	5–1	2–2	2–0	2–0	4–0	4–0	2–1	2–0	1–1	2–1	1–0	1–0	2–1	1–1	0–0
Bradford Park Avenue	2–3	0–1	4–2	1–1		1–2	1–0	1–0	2–1	2–1	2–2	1–1	4–0	1–1	2–2	2–0	1–0	1–0	1–0	2–1	0–1	2–1	1–1	2–1
Ellesmere Port Town	2–2	2–0	4–0	1–2	0–0		1–1	0–2	1–0	3–0	0–2	0–0	0–0	3–0	1–2	2–0	1–0	1–4	0–1	2–1	0–0	1–0	1–2	0–1
Fleetwood Town	1–1	2–0	0–1	0–0	0–0	0–2		1–2	1–4	1–1	1–2	1–1	1–1	0–0	0–1	1–3	1–0	0–3	0–1	0–2	1–1	1–1	0–1	1–1
Gainsborough Trinity	0–0	1–1	5–0	1–2	0–2	1–1	3–0		2–1	4–0	0–0	2–1	3–0	4–0	5–1	2–0	1–0	2–1	2–1	1–2	1–1	1–1	1–0	3–3
Goole Town	0–2	2–1	4–1	1–1	1–0	2–1	1–1	1–0		1–2	2–1	1–1	4–1	3–3	0–1	1–0	2–2	2–0	0–0	2–3	1–1	1–2	1–1	4–0
Great Harwood	1–3	2–0	3–1	2–2	2–3	0–2	6–3	4–2	0–0		3–0	2–0	1–1	4–2	0–3	3–1	3–3	2–1	0–1	2–2	2–1	1–4	0–0	0–0
Lancaster City	2–1	1–0	3–0	0–2	0–2	0–1	1–2	0–3	3–0	0–1		0–0	1–1	0–1	0–2	2–2	2–2	0–2	1–2	1–1	2–2	4–3	1–2	0–1
Macclesfield Town	2–3	2–1	1–0	0–1	2–2	4–0	1–0	1–0	1–2	0–0	0–0		3–0	4–1	1–1	0–0	3–1	1–0	1–0	0–0	4–0	4–1	0–2	0–1
Matlock Town	0–1	0–0	5–0	0–3	1–1	2–0	1–0	1–0	1–0	2–2	0–2	0–3		0–2	1–3	2–1	1–2	1–0	2–1	1–2	2–1	1–2	3–4	1–4
Morecambe	4–1	0–2	3–1	0–1	1–1	0–1	3–0	2–1	4–3	2–1	1–1	1–2	3–0		1–1	2–2	1–1	4–0	0–3	2–1	3–1	1–0	0–2	1–0
Mossley	2–3	1–4	3–3	3–1	4–2	1–0	5–0	1–1	4–1	1–0	1–2	2–2	2–2	2–1		1–1	1–0	3–1	1–2	0–0	1–2	3–2	3–1	1–3
Netherfield	2–2	2–1	0–3	2–1	5–0	1–1	0–2	2–1	2–0	2–1	4–1	2–0	1–0	6–2	2–1		1–1	4–3	0–2	0–1	0–1	1–0	2–0	2–2
Northwich Victoria	3–3	3–2	4–1	0–0	1–1	3–0	2–2	3–0	2–2	3–0	3–0	3–2	6–1	2–2	2–0	1–1		2–1	2–1	2–2	3–0	2–0	1–0	1–0
Runcorn	2–2	2–1	2–0	1–4	1–4	2–4	2–2	1–1	2–2	2–1	3–1	1–1	3–1	1–0	4–1	4–0	3–4		3–3	1–1	1–2	5–1	1–0	1–0
Scarborough	0–2	1–0	5–0	1–1	0–0	3–0	2–0	2–0	2–0	3–1	2–1	0–0	0–0	0–0	3–0	0–2	2–0	3–1		3–1	2–1	2–1	1–0	3–0
Skelmersdale United	1–2	2–1	2–2	1–0	0–0	5–0	0–0	1–4	2–1	1–1	4–1	2–0	0–2	1–1	0–0	3–2	4–1	1–2	2–3		1–0	0–1	0–2	2–2
South Liverpool	1–1	0–0	1–2	1–1	1–1	0–2	2–0	1–0	1–1	2–2	2–1	2–2	0–0	2–1	2–1	0–1	0–0	3–3	2–2	2–0		0–3	1–1	0–0
South Shields	1–0	1–2	3–1	1–3	2–1	2–2	0–2	3–2	3–1	0–1	1–5	0–2	2–0	3–1	2–0	2–3	1–0	2–2	3–2	0–1	0–1		3–1	1–2
Stafford Rangers	1–1	1–1	7–0	0–1	1–2	1–2	1–0	0–1	1–0	0–0	2–0	4–1	0–1	0–2	0–0	1–0	4–2	4–2	1–0	2–2	1–0	5–0		2–1
Wigan Athletic	4–1	4–1	1–0	0–0	2–0	1–1	4–0	1–1	4–2	4–0	1–0	2–0	4–1	1–0	2–1	3–0	1–0	3–0	1–1	0–0	1–2	2–0	0–0	

Updated to match(es) played on 4 May 1973. Source: The Football Archives
Legend: Blue = home team win; Yellow = draw; Red = away team win.

=== Stadia and locations ===
Locations of the 1972–73 Northern Premier League teams

Club	Stadium
Altrincham	Moss Lane
Bangor City	Farrar Road
Barrow	Holker Street
Boston United	York Street
Bradford Park Avenue	Park Avenue
Ellesmere Port Town	Ellesmere Port
Fleetwood	Highbury
Gainsborough Trinity	The Northolme
Goole Town	Victoria Pleasure Ground
Great Harwood	The Showground
Lancaster City	Great Axe
Macclesfield Town	Moss Rose
Matlock Town	Causeway Lane
Morecambe	Christie Park
Mossley	Seel Park
Netherfield	Parkside
Northwich Victoria	Drill Field
Runcorn	Canal Street
Scarborough	Athletic Ground
Skelmersdale United	White Moss Park
South Liverpool	Holly Park
South Shields	Simonside Hall
Stafford Rangers	Marston Road
Wigan Athletic	Springfield Park

== Cup results ==
=== Challenge Cup ===
Stage	Home team	Score	Away team
1st Leg	Northwich Victoria	?–?	Wigan Athletic
2nd Leg	Wigan Athletic	?–?	Northwich Victoria
Aggregate	Northwich Victoria	3–2	Wigan Athletic

=== Northern Premier League Shield ===
Between Champions of NPL Premier Division and Winners of the NPL Cup.

Home team	Score	Away team
Boston United	beat	Northwich Victoria

=== FA Cup ===
Out of the twenty-four clubs from the Northern Premier League, only three teams reached the second round:

Second Round

Home team	Score	Away team
Bangor City	2–3	York City
Notts County	2–1	Lancaster City
Scarborough	1–2	Doncaster Rovers

=== FA Trophy ===
Out of the twenty-four clubs from the Northern Premier League, five teams reached the fourth round:

Fourth Round

Home team	Score	Away team	
Bangor City	2–3	Ashford Town (Kent)	
Morecambe	1–1	Wigan Athletic	
Wigan Athletic	0–0	Morecambe	Replay
Wigan Athletic	1–0	Morecambe	2nd Replay
Scarborough	2–0	Chelmsford City	
Stafford Rangers	4–1	Bedford Town	

Semi-finals

Home team	Score	Away team	
Ashford Town (Kent)	0–1	Scarborough	
Wigan Athletic	0–0	Stafford Rangers	
Wigan Athletic	1–0	Stafford Rangers	Replay

Final

Home team	Score	Away team
Scarborough	2–1	Wigan Athletic

== End of the season ==
At the end of the fifth season of the Northern Premier League none of the teams put forward for election received enough votes to be promoted to the Football League. Ellesmere Port Town resigned the league.

=== Football League elections ===
Alongside the four Football League teams facing re-election, a total of ten non-League teams applied for election, two of which were from the Northern Premier League. All four Football League teams were re-elected.

Club	League	Votes
Colchester United	Football League	48
Northampton Town	Football League	43
Crewe Alexandra	Football League	36
Darlington	Football League	26
Yeovil Town	Southern League	14
Kettering Town	Southern League	12
Wigan Athletic	Northern Premier League	10
Chelmsford City	Southern League	4
Cambridge City	Southern League	1
Nuneaton Borough	Southern League	1
Telford United	Southern League	1
Bedford Town	Southern League	0
Boston United	Northern Premier League	0
Wimbledon	Southern League	0

=== Promotion and relegation ===
The following club left the League at the end of the season:

- Ellesmere Port Town resigned, demoted to Lancashire Combination

The following club joined the League the following season:

- Buxton promoted from Cheshire County League
