= Graham Reynolds (cricketer) =

Welsh cricketer and footballer (1937–2008)

Personal information
- Full name: Graham Edward Arthur Reynolds
- Born: 23 September 1937; Newport, Monmouthshire, Wales
- Died: 27 February 2008 (aged 70); Newport, Wales
- Batting: Left-handed
- Bowling: Right-arm medium

Domestic team information
- Years: Team
- 1969–1971: Glamorgan

Career statistics
Competition	First-class	List A
Matches	2	11
Runs scored	37	31
Batting average	37.00	10.33
100s/50s	0/0	0/0
Top score	23*	7
Balls bowled	192	492
Wickets	2	17
Bowling average	37.50	20.41
5 wickets in innings	0	1
10 wickets in match	0	n/a
Best bowling	2/24	5/37
Catches/stumpings	0/0	2/0
- Source: Cricinfo, 11 July 2017

Graham Edward Arthur Reynolds (23 September 1937 – 27 February 2008) was a Welsh cricketer and footballer. He played cricket for Glamorgan from 1969 to 1971.

Reynolds was born and died in Newport, Monmouthshire, and was educated at St Julian's High School, Newport, and at Exeter University. He appeared in two first-class matches but was most effective in List A cricket, taking 5 for 37 against Nottinghamshire in the Player's County League in 1969. He captained the Glamorgan Second XI several times.

He also played football for several Welsh clubs including Newport County (two spells), Caerleon Amateurs and Brecon Corinthians and was a Welsh Amateur International. He played as a centre forward.

Reynolds' sporting activities were restricted by his teaching commitments in schools in the Newport area. After Reynolds retired from teaching, he acted as Glamorgan County Cricket Club's school liaison officer in the 1980s and 1990s.
