= Joe Pritchard (footballer, born 1943) =

English footballer

Personal information
- Date of birth: 4 September 1943 (age 83)
- Place of birth: Birkenhead, England
- Position: Midfielder

Youth career
- –1962: Liverpool

Senior career*
| Years | Team | Apps | (Gls) |
| 1962–1970 | Tranmere Rovers | 178 | (29) |
- Ellesmere Port
| Total | | 178 | (29) |
- * Club domestic league appearances and goals

Joe Pritchard (born 4 September 1943) is a former professional footballer who played for Tranmere Rovers and Ellesmere Port. He scored 29 goals in 178 appearances for Tranmere, before moving to Ellesmere Port in June 1970. He was later employed as a joiner in Cammell Laird shipyard.
