= Colin Flatt =

English footballer (1940–2021)

Personal information
- Date of birth: 30 January 1940
- Place of birth: Blythburgh, England
- Date of death: September 2021 (aged 81)
- Place of death: Basildon, England
- Position: Centre forward

Senior career*
Years	Team	Apps	(Gls)
- Woodford Town
- Wisbech Town
- Cambridge United
1965–1966	Leyton Orient	33	(8)
1966–1967	Southend United	22	(8)
- Romford
1971–1973	Barnet	45	(10)
1973	St Albans City	2	(0)
- Dunstable Town
- Maidstone United
1975	Barnet	1	(0)
Total		103+	(26+)
- * Club domestic league appearances and goals

Colin Flatt (30 January 1940 – September 2021) was an English professional footballer who played as a centre forward.

== Career ==
Born in Blythburgh, Platt played for Woodford Town, Wisbech Town, Cambridge United, Leyton Orient, Southend United, Romford, Barnet, St Albans City, Dunstable Town and Maidstone United.

At Wisbech, Flatt made 153 appearances and scored 75 goals.

== Later life and death ==
After suffering from dementia, Flatt died following a fall at hospital, with the death being subject of an inquest which is due to take place in August 2026.
