= Brian Birch (footballer, born 1938) =

English footballer

Personal information
- Full name: Brian Birch
- Date of birth: 9 April 1938 (age 88)
- Place of birth: Southport, Lancashire, England
- Height: 5 ft 8 in (1.73 m)
- Position: Outside right

Senior career*
Years	Team	Apps	(Gls)
1955–1964	Bolton Wanderers	165	(23)
1964–1967	Rochdale	61	(6)
Total		226	(29)
- * Club domestic league appearances and goals

Brian Birch (born 9 April 1938) is an English former footballer who played for the majority of his career at Bolton Wanderers. He played mainly as an outside right.

Birch made his debut for Bolton at the age of 16 in the autumn of 1954 but did not make the regular first team until the 1957–58 season. He was an ever-present in Bolton's victorious FA Cup run (of which he is the last surviving player after the death of Tommy Banks in July 2024). He remained a regular up to the 1961–62 season but was pushed out of the team by the arrival of Francis Lee. Staying on the fringes for three more years he finally made the short journey across Lancashire to Rochdale, where he remained for three more years before moving into non-league football.

Birch was a schoolboy international, and was capped by England at youth level.

Birch is the grandfather of Canadian soccer player Will Johnson.

== Honours ==
Bolton Wanderers

- FA Cup: 1957–58
