= Jack Smith (footballer, born 1936) =

English footballer and manager

Personal information
- Full name: John Smith
- Date of birth: 24 April 1936
- Place of birth: West Hartlepool, England
- Date of death: 23 May 2008 (aged 72)
- Place of death: Margate, England
- Positions: Forward; midfielder

Senior career*
Years	Team	Apps	(Gls)
1953–1960	Hartlepool United	124	(50)
1960–1961	Watford		
1961–1964	Swindon Town	109	(48)
1964–1966	Brighton & Hove Albion	88	(33)
1966–1968	Notts County		
1968–1971	Margate	114	(30)
1971–1974	Ramsgate		

Managerial career
- 1971–1974: Ramsgate
- 1975–1976: Bath City
- 1976–1977: Swindon Town youth squad
- 1978–1979: Margate
- * Club domestic league appearances and goals

John Smith (24 April 1936 – 23 May 2008) was an English football player and manager from West Hartlepool. As a forward and midfielder, he was noted for his effective passing and aerial ability.

He played for Hartlepool United, Watford, Swindon Town, Brighton & Hove Albion, Notts County, Margate, and Ramsgate. He became player-manager of Ramsgate in 1971, and later managed Bath City, Swindon Town's youth squad, and Margate.

After retiring from managing, he ran a tea room and worked as a taxi driver in Thanet. He died in Margate on 23 May 2008.
