= Simon Jones (footballer) =

English footballer

Personal information
- Full name: Simon Christopher Jones
- Date of birth: 16 May 1945 (age 81)
- Place of birth: Nettleham, England
- Position: Goalkeeper

Youth career
- Gainsborough Trinity

Senior career*
| Years | Team | Apps | (Gls) |
| 1963–1967 | Rochdale | 47 | (0) |
| 1967–1968 | Chester | 3 | (0) |
- Stalybridge Celtic
| Total | | 50 | (0) |
- * Club domestic league appearances and goals

Simon Christopher Jones (born 16 May 1945) is an English footballer, who played as a goalkeeper in the Football League for Rochdale and Chester.
