= Harry Godbold =

English footballer

Personal information
- Full name: Harold Godbold
- Date of birth: 31 January 1939
- Place of birth: Springwell Village, England
- Position: Winger

Youth career
- Usworth Colliery

Senior career*
Years	Team	Apps	(Gls)
1956–1961	Sunderland	12	(1)
1961–1963	Hartlepools United	65	(8)
1963–1934	Boston United		
1964–1966	Boston		
1966–1967	Lincoln City	23	(3)
1967	Spalding United		
1967–1968	Boston		
1968–19??	Gateshead		
- * Club domestic league appearances and goals

Harold Godbold (born 31 January 1939) was an English professional footballer who played as a winger for Sunderland.
