= Jimmy Mulholland =

Scottish footballer

Personal information
- Full name: James Mulholland
- Date of birth: 10 April 1938
- Place of birth: Glasgow, Scotland
- Date of death: 21 June 1994 (aged 56)
- Place of death: Uddingston, South Lanarkshire, Scotland
- Position: Inside forward

Youth career
- Shettleston

Senior career*
Years	Team	Apps	(Gls)
1959–1962	East Stirlingshire	65	(38)
1962–1964	Chelsea	11	(2)
1964–1965	Greenock Morton	2	(1)
1965–1969	Barrow	134	(47)
1969–1970	Stockport County	32	(5)
1970–1971	Crewe Alexandra	1	(0)
Total		245	(93)
- * Club domestic league appearances and goals

James Mulholland (10 April 1938 – 21 June 1994) was a Scottish footballer, who played for East Stirlingshire, Chelsea, Greenock Morton, Barrow, Stockport County and Crewe Alexandra.
