= Tony Priscott =

English footballer (1941–2023)

Personal information
- Full name: Anthony John Priscott
- Date of birth: 19 March 1941
- Place of birth: Eastleigh, England
- Date of death: 4 July 2023 (aged 82)
- Place of death: Hampshire, England
- Height: 5 ft 7 in (1.70 m)
- Position: Winger

Senior career*
Years	Team	Apps	(Gls)
1959–1962	Portsmouth	35	(6)
1962–1966	Aldershot	141	(44)
1966–1967	Bournemouth & Boscombe Athletic	61	(7)
1967–1971	Aldershot	136	(27)
Total		373	(84)
- * Club domestic league appearances and goals

Anthony John Priscott (19 March 1941 – 24 July 2023) was an English professional footballer who played as a winger.

== Career ==
He started his career with Portsmouth, making 35 appearances and scoring 6 goals. In August 1962 he moved to Aldershot F.C., for whom he made 141 appearances and scored 44 goals. He then moved to Bournemouth & Boscombe Athletic in January 1966, scoring 6 times in 61 games for the club. In August 1967 Priscott returned to Aldershot. Staying until 1971, he made a further 136 appearances for the club, adding another 26 goals.

After finishing league football, Priscott went on to play non-league football for Poole Town between July 1971 and June 1973, making 59 appearances and scoring 3 goals. He subsequently moved on to Ringwood Town in 1973.

== Personal life and death ==
On 20 January 2007, The News published a sports mail edition featuring Priscott in its "Where are they now?" column. He later became a Christian minister.

Tony Priscott died on 4 July 2023, at the age of 82.
