= George Duncan (footballer) =

Scottish footballer (1937–2012)

Personal information
- Date of birth: 16 January 1937
- Place of birth: Glasgow, Scotland
- Date of death: 4 February 2012 (aged 75)
- Place of death: Chelmsford, England
- Position: Right winger

Senior career*
Years	Team	Apps	(Gls)
- Kirkintilloch Rob Roy
1957–1960	Rangers	12	(5)
1960	→ Raith Rovers (loan)		
1960–1961	Southend United	6	(2)
1961–1965	Chesterfield	140	(13)
1965–1967	Chelmsford City	76	(4)
- Folkestone Town
- Cambridge City
- Bury Town
- Braintree & Crittall Athletic
- Heybridge Swifts
- Maldon Town

Managerial career
- Braintree & Crittall Athletic
- Heybridge Swifts
- Maldon Town
- * Club domestic league appearances and goals

George Duncan (16 January 1937 – 4 February 2012) was a Scottish footballer who played as a winger.

== Career ==
Duncan began his career at Scottish non-league club Kirkintilloch Rob Roy, before signing for Rangers in 1957. On 22 February 1958, Duncan made his Rangers debut in a 5–1 home win against Queen's Park. On 8 March 1958, Duncan scored his first goals for the club, scoring two in a 3–1 away win against Clyde.

Duncan eventually fell out of favour at Rangers, competing with Scotland international Alex Scott on the wing. Following a loan move to Raith Rovers, Duncan moved to England in 1960, signing for Southend United. On 26 December 1960, Duncan scored twice on his debut for Southend, in a 2–2 draw against Halifax Town. However, these goals would be Duncan's only for Southend and in August 1961, signed for Chesterfield. Duncan made 140 Football League appearances at Chesterfield, scoring 13 times, before moving onto Chelmsford City in 1965. Duncan remained at Chelmsford for two seasons, scoring four goals in 76 appearances, before moving onto Folkestone Town. Duncan's later career was spent at Cambridge City and Bury Town, as well as player-manager roles at Essex-based clubs Braintree & Crittall Athletic, Heybridge Swifts and Maldon Town.
