= Roy Ridge =

English footballer (1934–2020)

Personal information
- Full name: Roy Ridge
- Date of birth: 21 October 1934
- Place of birth: Sheffield, England
- Date of death: 8 December 2020 (aged 86)
- Position: Defender

Youth career
- Ecclesfield

Senior career*
Years	Team	Apps	(Gls)
1951–1964	Sheffield United	11	(0)
1964–1966	Rochdale	85	(0)
- * Club domestic league appearances and goals

Roy Ridge (21 October 1934 – 8 December 2020) was an English footballer who played as a defender.
