= George Morton (footballer) =

English footballer

Personal information
- Full name: George Edmond Morton
- Date of birth: 30 September 1943
- Place of birth: Liverpool, England
- Date of death: 2009 (aged 65–66)
- Position: Inside forward

Senior career*
Years	Team	Apps	(Gls)
1960–1961	Everton		
1962–1966	Rochdale	147	(51)
1966	New Brighton		
1967	Bangor City		
Total		147	(51)
- * Club domestic league appearances and goals

George Edmond Morton (1943–2009) was an English footballer who played as an inside forward for Rochdale. He began his career as an apprentice with Everton before moving to Rochdale in 1962.
