= Ellesmere Port Town F.C. =

Ellesmere Port Town
- Full name: Ellesmere Port Town Football Club
- Founded: 1924; 2011 (reformed)
- Ground: Dunkirk Lane, Ellesmere Port
- League: West Cheshire League Division One
- 2025–26: West Cheshire League Division One, 15th of 16

Ellesmere Port Town Football Club is a football club based in Ellesmere Port, Cheshire, England. They are currently members of the West Cheshire League Division One.

== History ==
The club was formed in 1924 as Ellesmere Port Town F.C. and joined the Cheshire County League. After three seasons, in which they finished bottom twice, they joined the Liverpool County Combination.

They rejoined the Cheshire County League in 1948, playing at York Road. From 1958 to 1960, the club were league champions three seasons in a row, followed by a runners-up position and another championship the following season. In 1970–71 Ellesmere Port Town, now playing at Ellesmere Port Stadium on Thornton Road, on the outskirts of the town, finished fifth in the Cheshire County League and were promoted to the Northern Premier League, where they played for two seasons before resigning at the end of 1972–73. After this the club joined the Lancashire Combination for two years before entering the Mid-Cheshire League in 1976. However they soon folded in 1978.

A new Ellesmere Port Town was formed in the 1992 and entered the North West Counties Football League Division Two. The club lasted two seasons before folding again.

In 2011 Ellesmere Port Town F.C. was once again reformed, with its home ground at the Whitby Sports and Social Club, entering the Chester and District Football League Division Three. The club gained promotion in seasons 2011–12, 2012–13 and 2013–14 as well as winning the Cayzer Shield in 2012–13. A reserve team entered Division Three in the 2013–14 season and with the restructure of the league played its fixtures in Division Two for the 2014–15 season. The youth team entered the West Cheshire AFL in season 2014-15. In the 2015–16 season the first team was elected into Division Three of the West Cheshire AFL, the reserves took their place in the C&WFL Premier Division and a third team took the reserves place in Division Two. By 2018-19 season the first team was in the first division of the West Cheshire League with the Reserves in Division Three. A vets Team was also in the C&WFL Vets division.

Ellesmere Port Town F.C. also has a junior section, ages ranging from 3 to 16 years of age, a girls section for Under 12s and Under 16s and also a Ladies Section which gained promotion to the North West Women's Regional League in 2012–13, having won all of their league games and also a cup in the Cheshire Women's and Youth League.

== Honours ==
- Cheshire County League
  - Champions – 1957–58, 1958–59, 1959–60, 1961–62
  - Runners-up – 1960–61
- Chester and Wirral Football League
  - Cayzer Shield Winners - 2012-13
- West Cheshire Football League
  - Pyke Cup Runners-up - 2018-19
- Wirral District FA
  - Junior Cup Runners-up 2016-17, 2018–19
- Cheshire Women's and Youth League
  - Champions - 2012-13
- Cheshire Women's and Youth League Challenge Cup
  - Winners - 2011-12
- Cheshire Women's and Youth League, League Cup
  - Winners - 2012-13
  - Runners-up - 2011-12
- North West Women's Regional Football League
  - South Division Runners-up - 2013-14, 2014–15
- Cheshire County F.A. Ladies Cup
  - Runners-up - 2014–15

== Records ==
- FA Cup
  - First Round – 1971–72
- FA Trophy
  - Third Qualifying Round 1969–70
- Manager of the Month
  - Steve Simmons: August West Cheshire Manager of the Month

== Players ==
1. Players that have played/managed in the Football League or any foreign equivalent to this level (i.e. fully professional league).
People that play for them.

- (England) Joe Mercer

2. Players with full international caps.
3. Players that hold a club record or have captained the club.

- (England) John Fielding
