= Brian Taylor (footballer, born 1942) =

English footballer (1942–2024)

Personal information
- Full name: Brian Taylor
- Date of birth: 29 June 1942
- Place of birth: Manchester, England
- Date of death: 2024 (aged 81–82)
- Position: Wing half

Senior career*
Years	Team	Apps	(Gls)
1962–1968	Rochdale	132	(7)
1968–1974	Altrincham	195	(5)
Total		327	(12)
- * Club domestic league appearances and goals

Brian Taylor (29 June 1942 – 2024) was an English professional footballer who played as a wing half.

== Career ==
Born in Manchester, Taylor played for Rochdale and Altrincham.
