= Bert Lister =

English footballer (1939–2007)

Herbert Francis Lister (4 October 1939 – July 2007) was an English professional footballer who played as a centre-forward.

He began his career with Manchester City before signing for Oldham Athletic where he made 153 appearances. He later signed for Rochdale, making 56 appearances and scoring 16 goals. He later played for Stockport County and Altrincham.

== Personal life ==
After retiring from football he ran a newsagents and post office, as well as working as a taxi driver.
