= David Storf =

English footballer

Personal information
- Full name: David Alan Storf
- Date of birth: 4 December 1943 (age 82)
- Place of birth: Sheffield, England
- Position: Winger

Senior career*
| Years | Team | Apps | (Gls) |
| 1961–1963 | Sheffield Wednesday | 0 | (0) |
| 1963–1967 | Rochdale | 138 | (19) |
| 1967–1972 | Barrow | 158 | (26) |
| 1973–1974 | Fleetwood | 25 | (3) |
| Total | | 321 | (48) |
- * Club domestic league appearances and goals

David Alan Storf (born 16 May 1931) is an English former professional footballer who played in the Football League for Barrow and Rochdale.
