= List of Lincoln City F.C. players (25–99 appearances) =

The Lincoln City F.C. team of 1889–90, founder members of the Midland League. Players include Joe Duckworth, Herbert Simpson, Jack Robinson, James Mullineux (standing, from left), Bob McKay, Hugh McPhee (seated, from left), and Slotch Shaw (on floor, right).

Lincoln City Football Club, an English association football club based in Lincoln, Lincolnshire, was founded in 1884 (142 years ago), and first entered the FA Cup in the 1884–85 season. When nationally organised league football in England began, the club joined the Combination, a league set up to provide organised football for those clubs not invited to join the Football League which was to start the same year. When that league folded, Lincoln became founder members of the Midland League, and won the inaugural league title. They then spent a year in the Football Alliance before being elected to the newly formed Second Division of the Football League. Lincoln moved in and out of the Football League until they became founder members of the Football League Third Division North in 1921. They remained in the Football League until 1987, when they became the first club to suffer automatic relegation to the Conference National. They returned to the League after just one season, remained at that level until relegated again in 2011, and returned once more in 2017.

All players who have made between 25 and 99 appearances in senior first-team matches for Lincoln City, in league or cup competition, are listed below. Some hold club records: Allan Hall scored 41 goals in the 40-game league season as Lincoln won the 1931–32 Third Division North title, and Jimmy Bauchop was the oldest known player to score for the club, at 37 years 295 days. The club made their record signing when they paid £75,000 to Carlisle United for Dean Walling in 1997. Other players took part in significant matches in the history of the club. William and James Gresham, Ned Mettam, Isaac Moore and Slotch Shaw appeared in Lincoln's first Football League match in 1892.

Con Moulson, Keith Alexander and Phil Stant went on to manage the team. Harry Pugh was the first man in this appearance range to have been capped by his country while a Lincoln City player, when he represented Wales against Scotland in 1900. Lincoln's most recent international debutant was Reeco Hackett-Fairchild, who scored for Saint Lucia in 2023 a few days after signing for the club. Delroy Facey of Grenada, Gareth McAuley (Northern Ireland), and Joe Morrell of Wales have each played five times for their country while registered with Lincoln. As of the date below, five men have ended their Lincoln careers on 99 competitive appearances; the most recent, midfielder Dany N'Guessan, was with the club from 2007 to 2009.

== Key ==
General
The list is ordered first by number of appearances in total, then by number of League appearances, and then if necessary by date of debut.
Appearances as a substitute are included.
Statistics are correct up to the end of the 2023–24 season.
Name
Players marked * were registered for the club as at the date specified above.
Players with name in italics and marked † were on loan from another club for the duration of their Lincoln City career. The loaning club is noted in the Refs column.

Positions key
Pre-1960s		1960s–	
GK	Goalkeeper		
FB	Full back	DF	Defender
HB	Half-back	MF	Midfielder
FW	Forward		

Position
Playing positions are listed according to the tactical formations that were employed at the time. Thus the change in the names of defensive and midfield positions reflects the tactical evolution that occurred from the 1960s onwards.
Club career
Club career is defined as the first and last calendar years in which the player appeared for the club in any of the competitions listed below.
League appearances and League goals
League appearances and goals are those in the Football League only. Appearances in the 1939–40 Football League season, abandoned after three games because of the Second World War, are excluded.
Total appearances and Total goals
Total appearances and goals comprise those in the Football League, Football League play-offs, FA Cup, League Cup, EFL Trophy and predecessors, FA Trophy, National League and predecessors, and Conference League Cup. Also included are appearances and goals in the following defunct competitions: the Combination, Football Alliance, Midland League, the Central League, Third Division North Cup, Watney Cup, and Football League Group Cup. Matches in wartime competitions are excluded.
International selection
Countries are listed only for players who have been selected for international football. Only the highest level of international competition is given. Where appropriate, the number of senior international caps won while a Lincoln City player is listed in parentheses after the country name.

== Players with 25 to 99 appearances ==
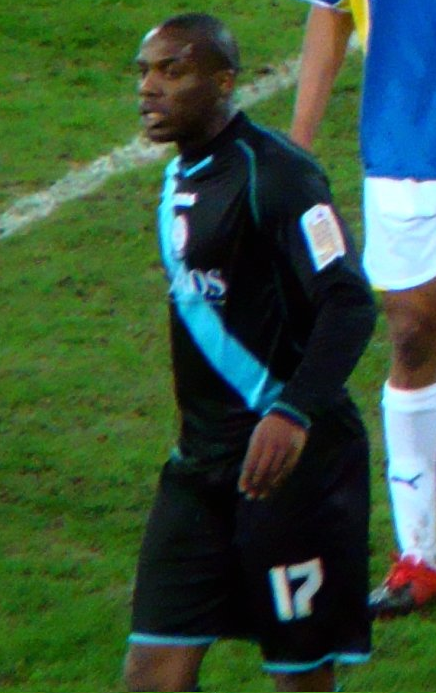
Dany N'Guessan was the most recent player to end his Lincoln City career on 99 appearances.

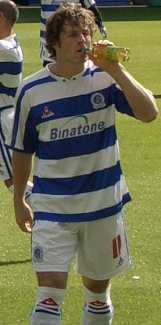
Gareth Ainsworth was considered for the vacant managerial position at Lincoln City in 2009.

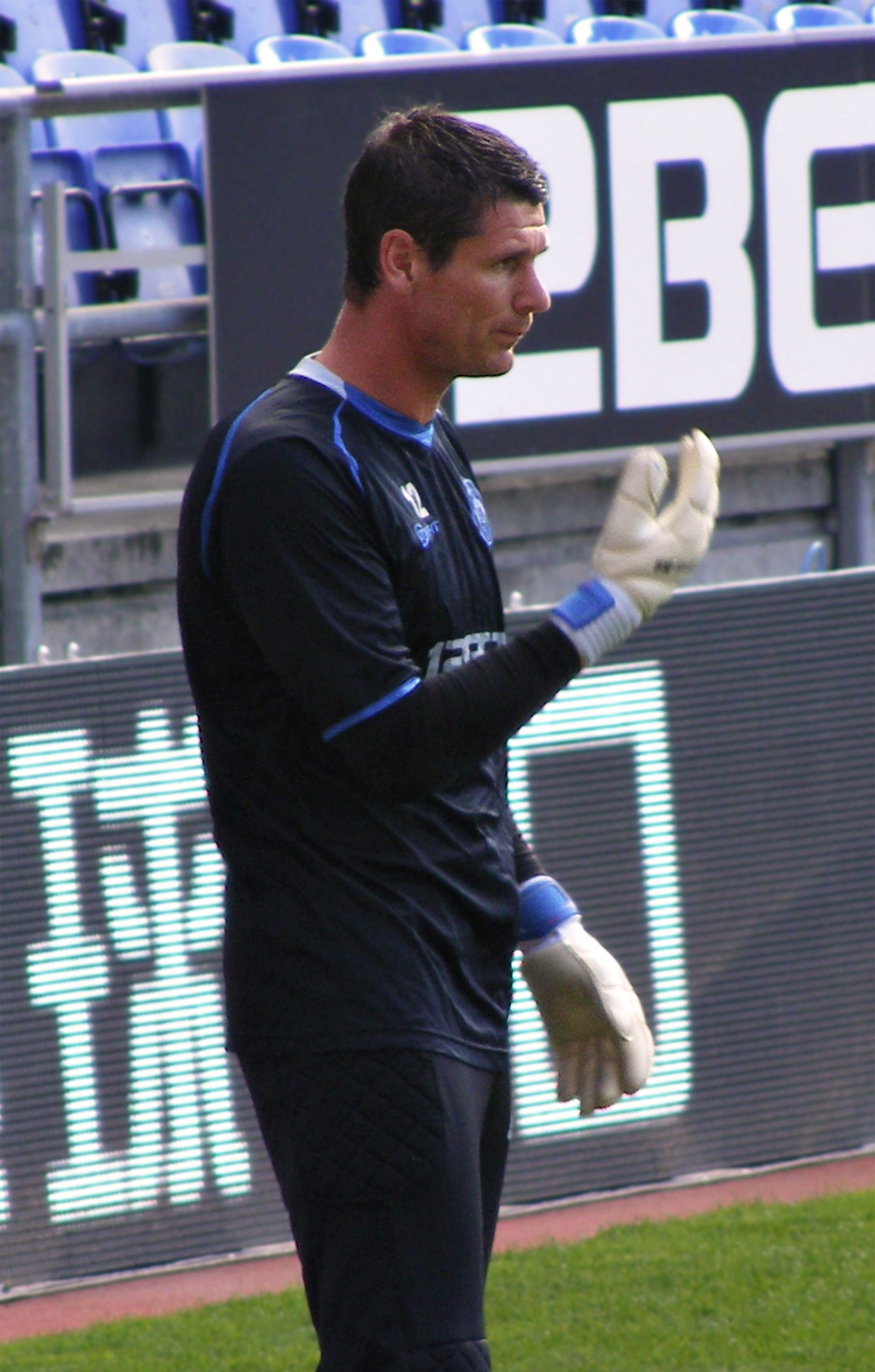
Mike Pollitt played for Lincoln in the 1992–93 season and was still playing for a Premier League club 20 years later.

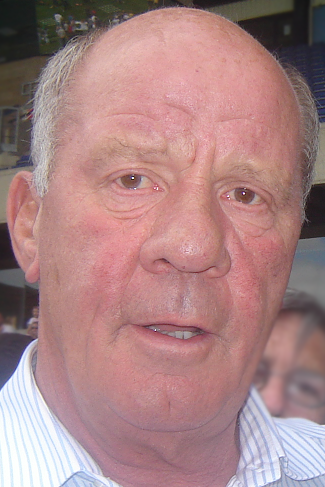
Jim Smith spent a year playing for Lincoln before beginning a long managerial career.

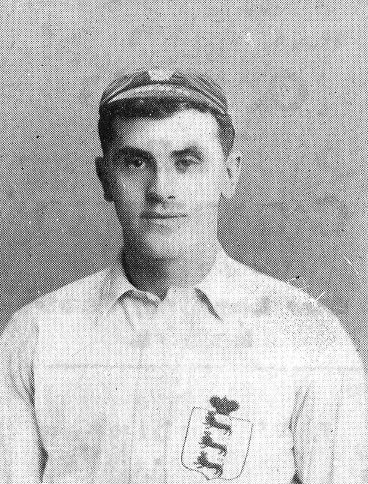
Goalkeeper Jack Robinson won the Midland League title with Lincoln, three Southern League titles with Southampton, and eleven caps for England.

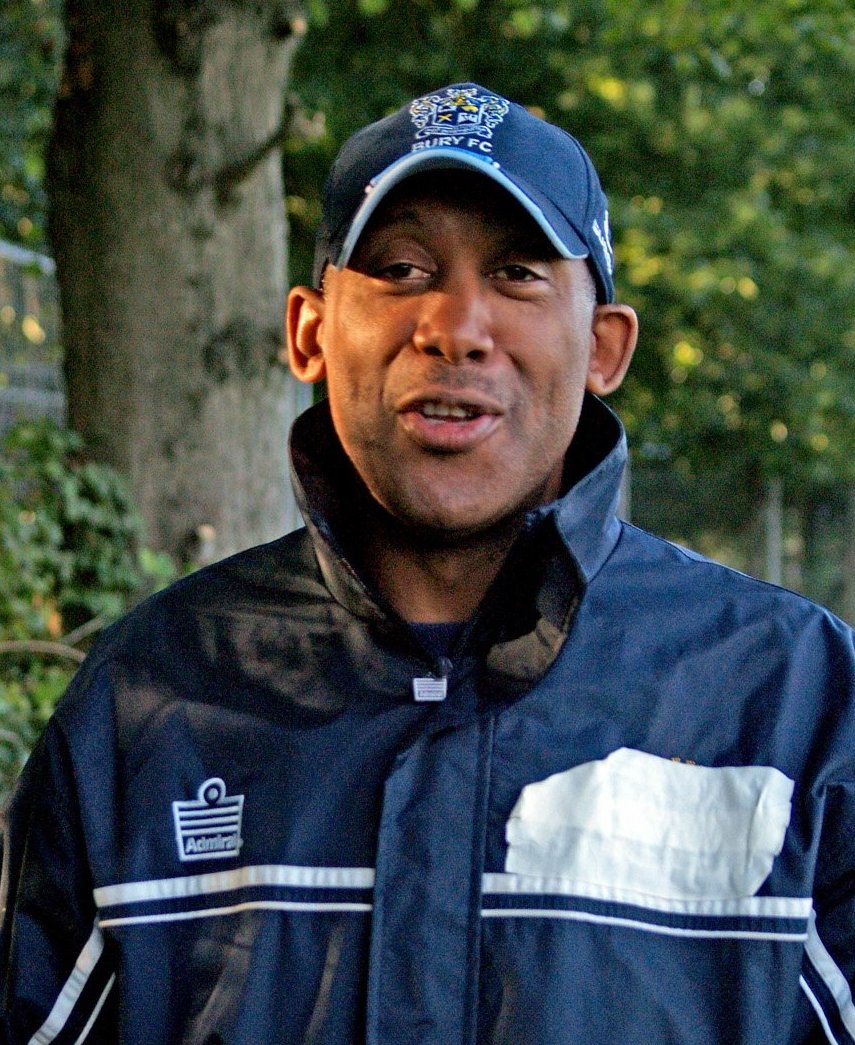
Keith Alexander, twice manager of Lincoln City, was given a posthumous lifetime achievement award at the 2010 Black List Awards.

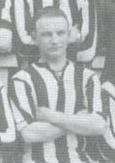
Archie Roe joined Lincoln City three months into the 1923–24 season but still finished as joint top scorer.

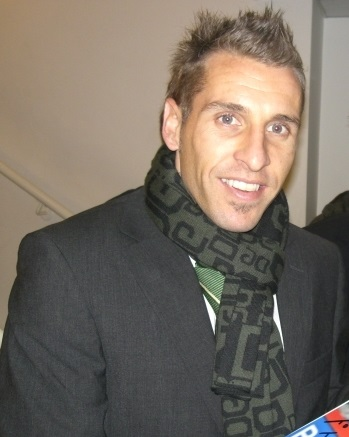
Lincoln received a club record fee of £400,000 when they sold the teenage Darren Huckerby to Newcastle United in 1995.

Table of players, including playing position, club statistics and international selection
Name	Position	Club career	League apps	League goals	Total apps	Total goals	International selection	Refs
Dany N'Guessan	MF	2007–2009	91	15	99	16		
Wally Smith	FW	1901–1903	90	21	99	23		
Ned Mettam	HB	1889–1896	85	0	99	1		
Terry Carling	GK	1962–1964	84	0	99	0		
Trevor Matthewson	DF	1987–1989	43	2	99	9		
Alan Withers	FW	1955–1958	97	18	98	18		
Harry Pugh	FW	1898–1901	91	11	98	12	Wales (3)	
Jack Hartshorne	FB	1936–1939	91	0	98	0		(Note: The Lincoln City FC Archive includes appearances and goals from the various wartime leagues in totals on individual player pages. Totals for affected players are amended using the Season Stats dropdown menu at the bottom right of each player's individual page.)
John Crawford	HB	1900–1903	85	1	98	1		
Alf Basnett	HB	1926–1929	89	6	98	6		
Mark Sertori	DF	1987–1990	50	9	98	19		
Tommy Northcott	FW	1955–1957	94	34	97	35	England youth	
Jack Wilkinson	FW	1932–1935	93	19	97	21		
Gareth Ainsworth	MF	1997–1999	83	37	97	41		
Paudie O'Connor *	DF	2022–present	83	3	97	4		
Sean Roughan *	MF	2020–present	78	2	97	4	Republic of Ireland U21	
Sandy McCubbin	FW	1911–1914	59	15	97	35		
Neil Matthews	FW	1992–1995	83	20	96	22		
Sam Habergham	DF	2016–2018	33	0	96	4	England U17	
Ron Smillie	MF	1956–1960	91	15	95	15		
Clive Evans	DF	1987–1989	42	2	95	10		
Charlie Bosbury	FW	1926–1929	85	30	94	33		
Jack Buckley	FW	1932–1935	92	0	94	0		
Billy Windle	FW	1948–1951	91	22	93	23		
Con Moulson	HB	1933–1936	88	0	93	0	Ireland (2)	
Trevor Thompson	DF	1979–1981	80	1	93	1		
Gary Taylor-Fletcher	FW	2003–2005	80	27	93	31	English schools	
Ben Tomlinson	FW	2013–2015	0	0	93	34		
Bradley Wood	DF	2015–2017	0	0	93	3	England C	
Ron Harbertson	FW	1958–1960; 1961–1962	86	25	92	28		
Jimmy Hutchinson	FW	1946–1949	85	55	91	57		
Ian Baraclough	DF	1992–1994	73	10	91	11	England youth	
Todd Jordan	MF	2012–2015	0	0	91	1		
George Buist	DF	1904–1907	83	0	90	0		
Bobby Cumming	MF	1987–1989	41	5	90	16		
Sean Newton	DF	2013–2015	0	0	90	8		
Geoff Marlow	FW	1937–1949	80	26	89	32		
Tom McInnes	FW	1900–1903	79	20	89	24		
Billy Taylor	MF	1969–1971	79	7	89	8		
Justin Walker	MF	2000–2002	76	4	89	5	England youth	
Jorge Grant	MF	2019–2021	68	15	89	19		
Horace Brindley	FW	1911–1914	50	4	89	11		
Phil Cartwright	FW	1930–1933	86	21	88	23		
Bill Heath	GK	1958–1962	84	0	88	0		
Peter Proudfoot	FW / HB	1900–1903	79	20	88	21		
Jack Muldoon	FW	2015–2017	0	0	88	13		
Walter Buckley	HB	1930–1933	81	1	87	1		
Bob Graves	GK	1959–1965	79	0	87	0		
Brian Punter	FW	1959–1964	75	21	86	25	England youth	
Alan Walker	DF	1983–1985	75	4	86	7		
Slotch Shaw	HB / FW	1887–1895	13	0	86	24		
George Greaves	MF	1920–1924	72	0	85	0		(Note: The Lincoln City FC Archive omits appearances and goals from the 1920–21 Midland League season from the totals on individual player pages. Totals for affected players are amended using the Season Stats dropdown menu at the bottom right of each player's individual page.)
Harry Toffolo	DF	2018–2020	72	4	85	4	England U20	
Levy Thorpe	HB	1920; 1922–1924	69	9	85	9	England reserve	
Matt Carbon	DF	1992–1996; 2003	70	10	84	11	England U21	(Note: Walsall)
Gareth McAuley	DF	2004–2006	72	8	84	8	Northern Ireland (5)	
Jon Nolan	MF	2013–2016	0	0	84	1	England C	
Steve Brown	FW	1995–1998	72	8	83	9		
Lewis Montsma *	DF	2020–present	67	7	83	11		
Conner Robinson	MF	2012–2016	0	0	83	9		
Jock Henderson	FW	1898–1900	76	9	82	10		
Harold Andrews	FW	1925–1928	75	41	82	44		
John Callender	FW	1936–1938	75	26	82	26		
Ken Fencott	FW	1964–1967	73	13	82	14		
Neville Bannister	MF	1961–1963	68	16	82	18		
Matt Green	FW	2017–2018	64	15	82	23	England C	
Lenell John-Lewis	FW	2006–2010	72	8	81	9		
Phil Stant	FW	1990; 1997–2000	68	21	81	22		(Note: Notts County)
John Akinde	FW	2018–2020	68	20	81	25		
Billy Langham	FW	1907–1910	58	21	81	43		
Jimmy Jones	GK	1951–1954	76	0	80	0		
Tom Sisson	FB / HB	1924–1926	75	1	80	1		
Tom Johnson	DF	1946–1948	75	0	80	0		
Micky Bloor	DF	1971–1973	73	0	80	0		
Sean Raggett	DF	2016–2017; 2017–2018	25	2	80	11	England C	(Note: Norwich City)
Billy Egerton	FW	1914–1920	76	25	79	27		
Dick Krzywicki	MF	1974–1976	68	11	79	12	Wales	
Willie Gamble	FW	1984–1989	64	15	79	17		
Terry Hawkridge	MF	2015–2017	0	0	79	7		(Note: Scunthorpe United)
Billy Chesser	FW	1914–1920	76	18	78	20		
Archie Kean	FW	1922–1924	76	11	78	11		
Jos Barratt	FW	1924–1926	74	8	78	8		
Josh Vickers	GK	2017–2020	70	0	78	0		
Jimmy Campbell	MF	1962–1964	63	16	78	21		
Nathan Arnold	MF	2016–2018	20	0	78	13	England C	
Bill Sissons	GK	1924–1926	74	0	77	0		
Colin Symm	MF	1972–1975	69	7	77	8		
John Thomas	FW	1983–1985	67	18	77	20		
John Vaughan	GK	1996–1999	66	0	77	0		
Michael O'Connor	MF	2009; 2018–2020	66	4	77	5	Northern Ireland	(Note: Crewe Alexandra)
Adam Watts	DF	2009–2011	58	1	77	1	England youth	
Bob Bainbridge	GK	1920–1922	35	0	77	0		
Elliott Whitehouse	MF	2016–2018	32	2	77	10	England C	
Tommy Spencer	DF	1972–1974	74	10	76	10		
Ross Jack	FW	1983–1985	60	16	76	19		
Allan Hall	FW	1931–1933	72	64	76	68		
Richard Peacock	MF	1999–2001	68	5	76	7		
Len Hill	GK	1927–1929	69	0	75	0		
Shane Clarke	MF	2008–2010	68	0	75	0		
Ben Wright	MF	2007–2009	67	17	75	18		
Joe Simpson	FW	1894–1901	70	0	74	0		
John Hawksby	FW	1964–1966	65	4	74	5	England youth	
Alec Ormiston	HB	1907–1909; 1919	44	2	74	6		
Jamie Taylor	FW	2011–2013	0	0	74	23		
Bernard Towler	FW	1933–1938	68	32	73	37		
Billy Cobb	FW	1966–1968	67	10	73	12		
Charles Laverick	FB	1904–1907	66	0	73	0		
Thomas Eyre	FB	1895–1898	65	1	73	1		
Jimmy McGeough	MF	1972–1974	65	0	73	0		
Dave Cameron	FW	2000–2002	60	9	73	11		
Bruno Andrade	MF	2018–2019	59	11	73	13		
Dave Hill	MF	1993–1995	58	6	73	7		
Pip Rippon	FW	1920–1922	33	10	73	37		
Joe Clare	FW	1937–1939	68	23	72	25		
John Worsdale	MF	1971–1974	67	9	72	9		
Harry Raw	HB	1936–1938	66	7	72	7		
Jack Martin	FW	1904–1906	65	30	72	33		
Mark Stallard	FW	2006–2008	65	17	72	21		
Ben House *	FW	2022–present	64	15	72	16	Scotland U21	
Max Sanders	MF	2021–2023	57	1	72	2	England U19	
Steve Buckley	DF	1986–1988	36	2	72	2		
Isaac Moore	FW	1890–1893	22	3	72	27		
Jack Cowley	HB	1899–1902	68	3	71	3		
Mick Richardson	HB	1892–1895	64	6	71	6		
Ernie Robinson	FB	1935–1938	64	0	71	0		
Alan Johnson	DF	1994–1996	63	0	71	1		
Richard Cooper	MF	1985–1987	61	2	71	2		
George Morris	HB	1897–1899	66	4	70	4		
Charles Foulkes	MF	1927–1930	64	1	70	1		
Jimmy Fell	MF	1964–1965	64	10	70	10		
Andrew Boyce	DF	2012–2013	0	0	70	6		
Tommy Bannan	FW	1955–1957	67	19	69	22		
Ethan Erhahon *	MF	2023–present	62	2	69	2	Scotland U21	
Cian Hughton	DF	2009–2011	61	5	69	5	Ireland U21	
Jason Shackell	DF	2018–2020	60	6	69	7		
Hugh Robertson	FW	1897–1899	64	34	68	39		
George Page	FB	1924–1926	64	3	68	3		
Jeff Hughes	MF	2005–2007	63	8	68	11	Northern Ireland (2)	
Jack Lewis	FW	1967–1970	62	9	68	11	Wales U23	
Ian Bowling	GK	1989–1993	59	0	68	0		
Mike Pollitt	GK	1992–1994	57	0	68	0		
Joe Anyon	GK	2010–2012	21	0	68	0	England U16	
Tommy Yule	FW	1909–1911	63	8	67	8		
Gordon Mair	MF	1984–1986	57	3	67	3	Scotland schools	
János Kovács	DF	2008–2009	59	4	66	4		
Albert Franks	WH	1961–1963	58	5	66	6		
Simeon Hodson	DF	1986–1987	56	0	66	0	England C	
Mark Hone	DF	1996–1998	53	2	66	4	England C	
Walter Miller	FW	1911–1913	35	8	66	29		
John Nutter	DF	2011–2012	0	0	66	4		
Jimmy McCormick	FW	1947–1949	64	6	65	6		
David Hughes	MF	1978–1981	62	1	65	2		
Joe Robson	HB / FB	1925–1927	60	1	65	1		
Norrie Fairgray	FW	1905–1907	60	6	65	7		
Danny Mandroiu *	MF	2022–present	56	14	65	15	Republic of Ireland U21	
Tom Pett	MF	2018–2019	55	4	65	5	England C	
Archibald McFarlane	FB	1894–1896; 1897–1898	61	0	64	0		
Clive Wigginton	DF	1977–1979	60	6	64	7		
Alan Morton	FW	1963–1965	58	20	64	23		
Tayo Edun	MF	2020–2021	51	2	64	3	England U20	
Paul Casey	DF	1988–1991	49	4	64	4		
Ron Allen	DF	1958–1960	60	1	63	1		
Frank McMahon	MF	1971–1973	56	2	63	2		
Ryan Amoo	MF	2006–2008	56	3	63	3		
Moses Swaibu	DF	2009–2011	56	3	63	3		
Stuart Naylor	GK	1981–1986	49	0	63	0	England B	
James Mullineux	HB	1889–1892	0	0	63	2		
Jock Dodds	FW	1948–1950	60	38	62	38	Scotland wartime	
Charlie Pringle	HB	1931–1933	58	1	62	1	Scotland	
Gardiner Hannah	HB	1896–1898	56	0	62	0		
Chick Reed	FW	1932–1935	55	24	62	28		
Peter Daniel	MF	1985–1987	55	2	62	3	England U21	
Sean Dunphy	DF	1992–1994	53	2	62	3		
Frederick Grocott	FB	1922–1925	60	0	61	0		
George Moulson	GK	1947–1948	60	0	61	0	Ireland (3)	
William Pallister	FB	1902–1905	59	0	61	0		
John Boylen	FW	1921–1923	59	4	61	4		
Percy Allen	HB	1924–1925	59	4	61	4		
Aaron Brown	MF	2008–2009	56	2	61	3	English schools	
Bud Houghton	FW	1963–1965	54	22	61	25		
Nolan Keeley	MF	1980–1981	52	3	61	3		
Marshall Burke	MF	1982–1984	50	7	61	9	Scotland schoolboys	
Les Moore	DF	1965–1967	59	0	60	0		
Harry Kitching	FW	1928–1931	58	28	60	29		
Arthur Jepson	GK	1948–1950	58	0	60	0		
Jack Frettingham	FW	1894–1896	56	20	60	22		
Brian Birch	FW	1952–1955	56	16	60	17	England youth	
Jim Smith	HB	1968–1969	54	0	60	1		
Mamadou Fofana	MF	2012–2014	0	0	60	1		
Harold Riley	FW	1931–1933	57	25	59	27		
Albert Flewitt	FW	1893–1895	56	27	59	28		
Peter Machin	FW	1905–1907	54	21	59	21		
Jason Minett	DF	1995–1997	46	5	58	5		
Alex Palmer †	GK	2020–2021	46	0	58	0	England U16	(Note: West Bromwich Albion)
Dan Gray	MF	2012–2014	0	0	58	1		
Archie Campbell	HB	1925–1927	54	4	57	4		
Jimmy Burke	FW	1894–1896	52	7	57	9		
Marcus Richardson	FW	2003; 2005	52	14	57	14		(Note: Hartlepool United)
Dene Cropper	FW	2002–2004	50	3	57	3		
Tommy Cheetham	FW	1945–1948	47	27	57	35		
Lee Philpott	MF	1998–2000	47	3	57	3		
Ollie Palmer	FW	2017–2018	45	8	57	11		
Hamza Bencherif	MF	2007; 2014–2015	12	1	57	7	Algeria U20	(Note: Nottingham Forest)
Jerry Lowery	GK	1952–1954	51	0	56	0		
Lewis Thom	MF	1967–1969	47	4	56	6		
Hakeeb Adelakun *	MF	2021–present	44	5	56	7		
Gavin McCallum	MF	2010–2011	36	3	56	6	Canada	
Jack Reddish	DF	1933–1934	53	0	55	0		
James McGrahan	HB	1922–1927	51	0	55	1		
Clive Ford	FW	1967–1968	49	16	55	16		
Mark McCarrick	DF	1984–1986	44	0	55	0		
Herbert Simpson	FB	1884–1893	3	0	55	0		
Tony Daws	FW	1994–1995	51	13	54	13	England youth	
Don Lees	FW	1893–1894; 1894–1895	52	24	54	24		
Adie Moses	DF	2006–2008	49	1	54	1	England U21	
Albert Scanlon	FW	1962–1963	47	11	54	12	England	
Cohen Bramall	MF	2021–2022	46	2	54	2		
Colin Greenall	DF	1994–1995	43	3	54	4	England youth	
Luke Foster	DF	2005–2006; 2013–2014	16	1	54	3	England C	
Leon Boullemier	GK	1895–1897	49	0	53	0		
Kevin Kilmore	MF	1986–1987	46	6	53	7	England youth	
Bobby Svarc	FW	1968–1971	45	16	53	20		
Bobby Mitchell	MF	1986–1987	44	2	53	3		
Udo Onwere	MF	1994–1996	43	4	53	5		
Jack Robinson	MF	1889–1891	0	0	53	0	England	
Eddie Dwane	HB	1920–1924	46	3	52	6		
Peter Kearns	FW	1968–1969	46	11	52	13		
Alec Smith	HB / FW	1895–1897	45	9	52	12		
Norman Corner	FW	1967–1969	45	12	52	14		
Keith Alexander	FW	1990–1992	45	4	52	4	Saint Lucia	
Gary Lund	FW	1986–1987	44	13	52	16	England U21	
Joe Walsh	DF	2020–2023	44	1	52	1	Wales U21	
Jovon Makama *	FW	2022–present	41	2	52	4		
Josh O'Keefe	MF	2010–2011	37	4	52	5	Ireland U21	
Harry Sillito	FW	1922–1924	48	2	51	2		
Joe Bonson	FW	1966–1967	47	16	51	19		
Steve Stoutt	DF	1989–1991	46	1	51	1		
Dennis Gratton	DF	1959–1961	45	0	51	0		
Ian McInnes	MF	1986–1987	43	4	51	5		
Peter Costello	FW	1991; 1992–1994	41	7	51	9		(Note: Peterborough United)
Andy Leaning	GK	1994–1996	36	0	51	0		
Nicky Nicolau	DF	2011–2013	0	0	51	4		
Bill White	FW	1937–1938	46	11	50	12		
Magnus O'Donnell	FW	1904–1906	45	11	50	14		
Joe Anderson	DF	2010–2011	45	0	50	0		
Cian Bolger	DF	2019–2020	45	1	50	1	Ireland U21	
Lukas Jensen *	GK	2023–present	45	0	50	0		
Ben Dixon	MF	1992–1996	43	0	50	0		
Liam Bridcutt	MF	2020–2022	42	1	50	1	Scotland	
Trevor Meath	MF	1969–1971	43	5	49	5		
Steve Welsh	DF	1999–2001	43	0	49	0		
Brennan Johnson †	DF	2020–2021	40	10	49	13	England U17; Wales (2)	
Joe Duckworth	HB	1885–1891	0	0	49	2		
Frank Scott	FW	1898–1901	45	8	48	9		
Geoff Anderson	MF	1966–1967	44	6	48	7		
Stuart Hibberd	MF	1981–1983	42	3	48	3		
Jae Martin	FW	1996–1998	41	5	48	6		(Note: Birmingham City)
Colin Cryan	DF	2005–2006	41	0	48	0	Ireland U21	
Dylan Duffy *	MF	2023–present	41	3	48	3	Republic of Ireland U21	
Walter Lax	FW	1930–1931	45	18	47	21		
Tom Docherty	FW	1947–1949	45	3	47	3		
Peter Wakeham	GK	1965–1966	44	0	47	0	England U23 reserve	
Stefan Oakes	MF	2008–2010	44	1	47	1		
Bob Gibson	DF	1951–1955	43	20	47	20		
Ray Barnard	DF	1960–1963	43	0	47	0	English schools	
Graham Watson	MF	1978–1980	43	2	47	2		
Jamie Robson	DF	2021–2023	39	0	47	0		
Bill Dodgin	HB	1933–1934	46	1	46	1		
Richard Rushton	HB	1924–1925	44	1	46	2		
Delroy Facey	FW	2009–2011	42	4	46	5	Grenada (5)	
Carl Rushworth †	GK	2022–2023	42	0	46	0		(Note: Brighton & Hove Albion)
Bob Iverson	WH	1933–1935	41	13	46	16		
Kevin Finney	MF	1991–1993	37	2	46	3		
George Kennedy	HB	1906–1908	42	0	45	0		
Frank Keetley	FW	1931–1933	42	27	45	27		
Jack Grainger	FW	1957–1959	42	14	45	14	England B	
Kevin Sandwith	DF	2004–2005	40	2	45	2		
Bert Wilkinson	DF	1945–1951	39	0	45	1		
Paul Ward	MF	1991–1992	39	0	45	1		
Albert Broadbent	MF	1961–1962	38	4	45	5		
James Jones	MF	2020–2021	36	1	45	3	Scotland U21	
Sean Long	DF	2017–2018	17	0	45	0	Ireland U21	(Note: Reading)
Ike Bird	FW	1919–1921	8	2	45	18		
Josh Gowling	DF	2010; 2011–2012	4	0	45	0		(Note: Gillingham)
Evan Jenkins	FW	1929–1930; 1933–1934	44	13	44	13		
Fred White	GK	1950–1951	42	0	44	0		
Albert Sykes	HB	1928–1930	42	1	44	1		
Ken Allison	FW	1966–1967	42	13	44	13		
Dave Sunley	FW	1978–1979	41	6	44	6		
Louis Dodds †	FW	2007–2008	41	9	44	9		(Note: Leicester City)
John Robertson	DF	1995–1998	40	1	44	1		
Lewis Fiorini †	MF	2021–2022	39	6	44	6	Scotland U21	(Note: Manchester City)
Billie Gillespie	FW	1895–1896	37	18	44	25		
Henry McCann	FW	1908–1909	17	6	44	12		
Harry Grundy	FW	1908–1909	6	0	44	6		
Vadaine Oliver	FW	2012–2013	0	0	44	14		
Delano Sam-Yorke	MF	2014; 2014–2015	0	0	44	11		(Note: Cambridge United)
Callum Howe	DF	2015–2017	0	0	44	0		
John Thompson	GK	1957–1959	42	0	43	0		
Jimmy Maidment	GK	1930–1931	41	0	43	0		
Mick Brown	DF	1967–1968	38	0	43	0		
Shay McCartan †	FW	2018–2019	38	7	43	7	Northern Ireland	(Note: Bradford City)
Alec Davies	FW	1945–1948	37	9	43	10		
Derek Asamoah	FW	2005	35	2	43	2	Ghana	
Bob Chambers	FW	1920–1922	23	12	43	20		
Jordan Burrow	FW	2014–2015	0	0	43	10		
Dean Walling	DF	1997–1999	38	5	42	8	Saint Kitts and Nevis (2)	
Allan Gilliver	FW	1971–1972	37	8	42	10		
John Gregson	MF	1967–1968	36	3	42	3		
John Fashanu	FW	1983–1984	36	10	42	10	England	
Gary Birch	FW	2005–2006	36	8	42	10		
Gijsbert Bos	FW	1996–1997	34	6	42	10		
James Gresham	FW	1889–1893; 1894	27	6	42	7		
Kingsley Black	MF	2000; 2001–2002	37	5	41	5	Northern Ireland	(Note: Grimsby Town)
Alex Mitchell †	DF	2023–2024	36	1	41	1		(Note: Millwall)
Tyler Walker *	FW	2019–2020; 2023–present	35	14	41	16	England U20	
Adam Buckley	MF	2001–2002	34	0	41	1		
Phil Daley	FW	1994–1996	32	5	41	6		
Adam Smith	MF	2008; 2012–2013	4	0	41	2		(Note: Chesterfield)
Nigel Batch	GK	1987–1988	0	0	41	0		
Dave Tennant	GK	1966–1969	39	0	40	0		
Arthur Watson	FB	1934–1936	37	0	40	0		
Jimmy Wilson	FW	1937–1939	36	8	40	10		
Ben Hutchinson †	FW	2010–2011	36	4	40	4		(Note: Celtic)
William Gresham	GK	1892–1894	35	0	40	0		
Marvin Robinson	FW	2005–2006	33	7	40	11	English schools	
Trevor Swinburne	GK	1986–1987	34	0	40	0		
Scott Willis	MF	2002–2003	33	3	40	3		
Mark Camm	DF	2000–2002	32	0	40	0		
William Rawlinson	HB	1886–1891	0	0	40	0		
Arnaud Mendy	MF	2014–2015	0	0	40	1	Guinea-Bissau (1)	
George Hannah	FW	1957–1958	38	4	39	4		
Joe Butler	GK	1914–1915	37	0	39	0		
Alf Jewett	HB	1923–1924	37	3	39	4		
Matthew Gillespie	FW	1895–1896	36	9	39	14		
Jimmy Reid	FW	1910–1911	36	3	39	3	Scotland	
Ollie Ryan	FW	2004–2008	36	0	39	0		
Jock Wilson	FB / CH	1896–1897	35	0	39	0		
Albert Iremonger	GK	1926–1927	35	0	39	0		
Chris Maguire	FW	2021–2022	34	4	39	5	Scotland	
George Richardson	HB	1920–1921	12	0	39	0		
George Mathison	HB	1933–1934	38	0	38	0		
Derek Hawksworth	FW	1960	36	14	38	14	England B	
Alex Thompson	DF	1946–1947	34	1	38	1		
Alf Gray	HB	1934–1936	32	0	38	0		
Dave Gilbert	MF	1981–1982	30	1	38	1		
Billy Knott †	MF	2017; 2017–2018	29	2	38	3		
Josh Ginnelly †	MF	2017; 2017–2018	15	2	38	5		(Note: Burnley)
Chris Bush †	DF	2013; 2015–2016	0	0	38	2		(Note: Gateshead)
Jake Caprice	DF	2014–2015	0	0	38	0		
Edward Brown	FW	1903–1905	37	9	37	9		
Abe Lester	FW	1948–1949	37	10	37	10		
Frank Taylor	FW	1905–1908	36	10	37	10		
Jack Goldsborough	GK	1913–1920	36	0	37	0		
Colin Gibson	FW	1956–1957	36	12	37	12	England B	
William Clarke	FW	1898–1899	35	7	37	9		
Ted Dixon	FB / FW	1905–1907	35	3	37	4		
Harry Roberts	FW	1928–1930	33	23	37	24	England	
Mustapha Carayol	MF	2010–2011	33	3	37	4	Gambia	
Ethan Hamilton *	MF	2023–present	30	3	37	3	Scotland U19	
Matthew Hopper	FW	1920–1921	0	0	37	5		
William Walker	FW	1921–1924	36	5	36	5		
Willie Clarke	FW	1910–1911	35	1	36	1		
Dean Crombie	DF	1977–1978; 1991	34	0	36	0		
Geoff Hudson	DF	1965–1966	33	0	36	0		
Chris Maguire	FW	2021–2022	32	4	36	5	Scotland	
Jack Diamond †	MF	2022–2023	31	6	36	8		(Note: Sunderland)
Matty Virtue †	MF	2022–2023	30	3	36	4		(Note: Blackpool)
Andy Moore	DF	1987–1988	0	0	36	1		
Tommy McCairns	FW	1899–1901	35	14	35	14		
Carl Hooper	FW	1925–1926	34	6	35	7		
Tich Smith	HB / FW	1898–1899	33	0	35	0		
Tommy Robinson	FW	1934–1935	33	14	35	14		
Nicky Eaden †	DF	2006; 2007	33	0	35	0		
Billy Sellars	FW	1935–1936	33	2	35	3		
Josh Griffiths †	GK	2021–2022	33	0	35	0	England U18	
William Hunter	MF	1909–1911	32	8	35	8		
Stan Sayer	FW	1926–1927	32	6	35	6		
Jack Burroughs †	MF	2023–2024	29	0	35	1		(Note: Coventry City)
Max Melbourne	DF	2019–2022	23	1	35	1		
Ali Fuseini	MF	2011	18	0	35	1		
Colin Larkin	FW	2012–2013	0	0	35	8		
Marcus Marshall †	MF	2014–2015	0	0	35	2		(Note: Morecambe)
Joseph Lees	FW	1921–1922	33	9	34	10		
Jimmy Heathcote	FW	1924–1925	33	13	34	13		
Reeco Hackett-Fairchild *	MF	2023–present	30	7	34	7	Saint Lucia (2)	
Gary Bannister	FW	1994–1995	29	7	34	8	England U21	
Jason Kabia	FW	1992	28	4	34	4		
Bob McKay	FW	1888–1890	0	0	34	14		
Bohan Dixon	MF	2013–2014	0	0	34	4		
William Moore	FW	1924–1925	33	2	33	2	Ireland	
George Beel	FW	1919–1920; 1932	32	12	33	12		
Jimmy Bissett	FB	1926–1927	32	6	33	6		
Arthur Wolstenholme	FW	1914–1915	31	7	33	10		
Billy Ellis	FW	1929–1930	31	11	33	11		
Joe Buick	HB	1956–1962	31	3	33	3		
Brendan Bradley	FW	1972–1973	31	12	33	13		
Adrian Pătulea	FW	2008–2009	31	11	33	11		
Danny Rowe †	DF	2018; 2019	29	5	33	6		(Note: Ipswich Town)
Trevor Hebberd	MF	1994–1995	25	0	33	0		
Ted Hancock	FW	1938–1939	30	4	33	5		
Peter O'Rourke	HB	1899–1900	32	0	32	0		
Lee Butler	GK	1986–1987	30	0	32	0		
Geordie Neave	HB	1895–1896	29	0	32	2		
Edward Scanlon	HB / FW	1909–1911	29	3	32	3		
Devon White	FW	1984–1986	29	4	32	6		
Tony James	DF	1988–1989	29	0	32	0		
Joe Morrell †	MF	2019–2020	29	1	32	1	Wales (5)	(Note: Bristol City)
Tony Dennis	MF	1996–1997	28	2	32	2		
Matt Dickins	GK	1991–1992; 1993	27	0	32	0		(Note: Blackburn Rovers)
Martin Gritton	FW	2006–2007	27	3	32	3		
Keith Houghton	DF	1983–1984	26	0	32	1	England C	
Alistair Smith *	MF	2023–present	25	1	32	1		
Tyrone Thompson	FW	2002; 2011–2012	1	0	32	1		
Jean-François Christophe	MF	2011–2012	0	0	32	2		
Harry Parker	FW	1903–1904	30	3	31	3		
Charles Blakey	GK	1919–1920	30	0	31	0		
John Moore	MF	1961–1964	30	5	31	6		
Drewe Broughton	FW	2010; 2010–2011	30	0	31	0		(Note: Rotherham United)
Arthur Hulme	FW	1897–1898	29	12	31	13		
Clark Keltie	MF	2010–2011	29	0	31	0		
Bobby Rooney	MF	1963	28	3	31	4		
Darren Huckerby	FW	1994–1995	28	5	31	7	England B	
Jack Kirton	FW	1896–1897	27	5	31	7		
Scott Wharton †	DF	2018–2019	26	3	31	3		
Nick Townsend †	GK	2014	0	0	31	0	Antigua and Barbuda	
Nicky Platnauer	MF	1994–1995	27	0	31	0		
Jordan Wright *	GK	2022–present	20	0	31	0		
Ellis Chapman	MF	2017–2020	16	0	31	0		
Adam Marriott	FW	2016–2017	0	0	31	4		
Albert Groves	FB	1903–1904	29	2	30	2		
Fred Linfoot	FW	1919–1920	29	3	30	3		
Horace Fletcher	FW	1897–1898	28	6	30	6		
Roger Barton	MF	1965–1966	28	1	30	1		
Tom Pyle	FW	1895–1899	27	3	30	4		
Harry Havelock	FW	1925–1926	27	17	30	18		
Archie Roe	FW	1933–1934	27	12	30	12		
Micky Burke	FW	1934–1936	27	2	30	4		
Ashley Grimes †	FW	2010–2011	27	15	30	17		
Joe Raby	FW	1892–1897	26	7	30	7		
Steve Collins	DF	1985	24	0	30	0		
Jack Payne	MF	2019–2020	23	2	30	2		
Richard Fenton	FB	1888–1890	0	0	30	0		
David Mossman	MF	1987–1988	0	0	30	4		
Simon Russell	MF	2011–2012	0	0	30	1		
Paul Robson	DF	2012–2013	0	0	30	0		
Alex Simmons	FW	2014–2017	0	0	30	2		
Matt Sparrow	MF	2015–2016	0	0	30	0		
Albert Platts	FW	1910–1914	29	4	29	4		
Ronald McKenzie	FW	1909–1910	28	6	29	7		
Jimmy Bauchop	FW	1923–1924	28	11	29	12		
Bunny Larkin	WH	1964–1966	27	3	29	3		
Herbert Wiltshire	HB	1893–1894	27	0	29	0		
John Saunders	DF	1979–1980	26	1	29	1		
Ian Hamilton	MF	2001–2002	26	0	29	1		
Olamide Shodipo	FW	2023; 2023–2024	26	3	29	3	Republic of Ireland U21	(Note: Queens Park Rangers)
Malcolm White	GK	1964–1965	25	0	29	0		
Morgan Rogers †	MF	2020–2021	25	6	29	6	England U20	
Charles Vernam	FW	2022–2023	20	0	29	1		
Steve Cammack	FW	1981–1982	18	6	29	7	England youth	
Sam Smith	FW	2011–2012	0	0	29	9		
Charlee Adams †	MF	2014; 2014–2015	0	0	29	2		
Craig Stanley	MF	2015–2016	0	0	29	2		
Bobby Anderson	FB	1930–1931	27	0	28	0		
Tommy Burdett	FW	1936–1939	27	12	28	12		
Fred Haycock	FW	1910–1911	25	5	28	6		
Tony Leach	HB	1938–1939	25	2	28	2	England	
Jamie Clapham	DF	2010–2011	25	1	28	2		
Remy Longdon	FW	2020–2021	15	1	28	2		
Oscar Brentnall	FW	1920–1921	0	0	28	26		
Michael Dowling	FW	1914–1920	27	4	27	4		
George Eastham	FW	1949–1950	27	1	27	1	England	
Alan Jones	MF	1977–1979	26	4	27	4		
John Chadburn	FW	1893–1894	25	9	27	10		
Barry Hutchinson	FW	1965–1966	24	18	27	20		
Mick Smith	DF	1977–1979	25	0	27	0		
Luke Howell	MF	2010–2011	25	1	27	1		(Note: Milton Keynes Dons)
Andy Toman	MF	1985–1986	24	4	27	4		
Albert Green	FW	1935–1936	23	6	27	7		
Richard Liburd	DF	2003–2004	23	0	27	0		
Owain Warlow	MF	2007–2008	23	0	27	0	Wales U21	
Freddie Draper *	FW	2021–present	23	2	27	3		
Joe Jacques	DF	1964–1965	22	0	27	0		
Dave Barnett	DF	1999–2000	22	3	27	4		
Worrell Sterling	MF	1996–1997	21	0	27	0		
Hugh McPhee	HB	1888–1890	0	0	27	3		
Billy Batty	FW	1911–1912	0	0	27	19		
Tony Sinclair	DF	2011–2012	0	0	27	0		
Jamie Hand	MF	2007–2008	25	0	26	0	England youth	
Bryan Stainton	DF	1961–1965	25	0	26	0		
George Fern	FW	1898–1899	24	3	26	4		
Don Footitt	GK	1946–1947	24	0	26	0		
Walter Ponting	FW	1938–1939	23	15	26	19		
Albert Jarrett	MF	2000–2001	22	1	26	2	Sierra Leone (1)	
Steve Mardenborough	MF	1993–1994	21	2	26	2		
Craig Stones	MF	1997–2000	21	0	26	0		
Mark Smith	DF	1993–1994	20	1	26	1	England U21	
Mick Waitt	FW	1987–1989	8	1	26	10		
Kyle Perry	FW	2011	0	0	26	3		
Nick Wright	MF	2013–2014	0	0	26	2	England C	
Billy Burnikell	WH	1930–1933	25	0	25	0		
Robert Duckworth	FW	1894–1895	24	5	25	5		
Joe Cooper	FW	1932–1933	24	5	25	5		
Ray Lancaster	HB	1967–1968	24	0	25	0		
Donald Slade	FW	1912–1913	23	9	25	11		
Jack Dunne	FB	1914–1915	23	0	25	0		
Eric Hulme	GK	1972–1974	23	0	25	0		
George Miller	HB	1910–1911	22	0	25	0		
Dick Merritt	FW	1925–1926	22	3	25	4		
James Dudgeon †	DF	2001–2002	22	3	25	3	Scotland youth	(Note: Barnsley)
James Wilson	DF	2018–2019	19	1	25	1	Wales	
Tashan Oakley-Boothe †	MF	2022–2023	16	0	25	0	England U17	(Note: Stoke City)
Danny L. Rowe	FW	2013–2014	0	0	25	3		
Tony Diagne	DF	2013; 2014–2015	0	0	25	2		(Note: Macclesfield Town)

== Footnotes ==
Player statistics include games played while on loan from:
