= George Miller =

George Miller may refer to:

== Entertainment ==
- George Miller (comedian) (1941–2003), American comedian
- George Miller (filmmaker) (born 1945), Australian film director, producer and screenwriter
- George T. Miller (1943–2023), Australian film and television director
- George Bures Miller (born 1960), Canadian artist
- George Miller, stage name Joji (born 1993), Japanese musician and Internet personality formerly known under the pseudonyms Filthy Frank and Pink Guy
- George Miller (Lassie), fictional character in the long-running television series Lassie

== Politics ==
- George Funston Miller (1809–1885), U.S. Representative from Pennsylvania
- George Clark Miller (1882–1968), mayor of Vancouver, British Columbia
- George P. Miller (1891–1982), U.S. Representative from California
- George Paul Miller (Wisconsin politician) (1868–1930), Wisconsin state senator and automobile dealer
- George Miller (Arizona politician) (1922–2014), mayor of Tucson, Arizona 1991–1999
- George Miller (California politician) (born 1945), former United States Representative from California's 11th congressional district
- George Miller (New York politician) (1799–1883), New York lawyer, assemblyman, district attorney, county judge
- George Miller Jr. (1914–1969), California Democratic politician, father of George Miller (California politician)
- G. William Miller (1925–2006), U.S. Secretary of the Treasury, 1979–1981
- George W. Miller (politician) (1922–1997), New York assemblyman
- George Miller (West Virginia politician) (born 1952), member of the lower house of the west virginia legislature
- George W. Miller Jr. (1930–2021), member of the North Carolina House of Representatives

== Sports ==
- George Miller (American football), American football coach
- George Miller (baseball) (1853–1929), baseball player
- George Miller (cricketer) (1929–2017), Scottish cricketer
- George Miller (footballer, born 1886) (1886–?), Scottish footballer who played as a left half for Lincoln City
- George Miller (footballer, born 1894) (1894–1939), Scottish footballer
- George Miller (soccer, born 1927), South African footballer
- George Miller (footballer, born 1939) (1939–2008), Scottish footballer and manager
- George Miller (footballer, born 1945), Scottish footballer
- George Miller (footballer, born 1980), Liberian footballer
- George Miller (footballer, born 1991), English footballer
- George Miller (footballer, born 1998), English footballer currently with Cheltenham Town F.C.
- George Arthur Miller (1867–1935), British polo player
- George "Doggie" Miller (1864–1909), baseball player and manager

== Science and architecture ==
- George Abram Miller (1863–1951), American mathematician
- George E. Miller (1919–1998), American medical educator
- George H. Miller (architect, born 1856) (1856–1927), American architect in Bloomington, Illinois
- George H. Miller (architect, born 1949), American architect in New York City
- George Armitage Miller (1920–2012), American psychologist
- George H. Miller (physicist), American physicist
- George James Miller (1902–1940), Scottish architect

== Other ==
- George Miller (historian) (1764–1848), Irish Anglican priest and historian of Trinity College, Dublin
- George Miller (bishop) (1794–1856), American bishop in the Latter Day Saint church
- George L. Miller (1830–1920), founder of the Omaha Herald newspaper
- George Macculloch Miller (1832–1917), lawyer and secretary of Cathedral of St. John the Divine in New York City
- George W. Miller (judge) (1941–2016), judge of the United States Court of Federal Claims
- George Stewart Miller (1884–1971), president of Tufts College, 1937 to 1938
- George D. Miller III (born 1951), president of Davis College in Johnson City, New York
- George Fuller Miller Sr. (1903–1980), Boy Scouts of America executive
- George D. Miller (born 1930), U.S. Air Force general
- George Frazier Miller (1864–1943), American religious official and activist

== See also ==
- Georges Miller (1906–1979), Luxembourgish wrestler
- George Millar (disambiguation)
- George A. Miller (disambiguation)
