= Moulson =

Moulson is a surname and may refer to:

- Con Moulson (1906–1989), Irish footballer and manager
- George Moulson (1914–1994), Irish professional football player
- Matt Moulson (born 1983), Canadian professional ice hockey left winger
- Robert Moulson (1932–2003), American classical tenor
- Roger Moulson, English poet whose debut volume Waiting for the Night-Rowers won the Jerwood Aldeburgh First Collection Prize
- Thomas Moulson (1582–1638), alderman, member of the Grocers' Company, Sheriff of London in 1624 and Lord Mayor of London in 1634

== See also ==
- Moulon (disambiguation)
- Olson (disambiguation)
- Oulon
