= Pallister (surname) =

Pallister is a surname. Notable people with the surname include:

- Brian Pallister (born 1954), Canadian politician
- David Pallister (1945–2021), British investigative journalist
- David Pallister (United States Air Force officer) (1915–2003), colonel in the U.S. Air Force
- Gary Pallister (born 1965), English former professional footballer
- Gordon Pallister (1917–1999), English footballer
- Graeme Pallister, Scottish chef and restaurateur
- Lani Pallister (born 2002), Australian swimmer
- Matthew Pallister (born 1969), Australian slalom canoeist
- Minnie Pallister (1885–1960), English political activist
- William Pallister (1884–1904), English footballer
