= Albert Groves =

Albert Groves may refer to:

- Albert Groves (footballer, born 1886) (1886–1960), Welsh footballer and manager
- Albert Groves (footballer, born 1883), English footballer
- Albert B. Groves, American architect
