= George Tweedy =

English footballer (1913–1987)

Personal information
- Full name: George Jacob Tweedy
- Date of birth: 8 January 1913
- Place of birth: Willington, County Durham, England
- Date of death: 23 April 1987 (aged 74)
- Height: 5 ft 11 in (1.80 m)
- Position: Goalkeeper

Youth career
- Willington

Senior career*
Years	Team	Apps	(Gls)
1932–1953	Grimsby Town	347	(0)

International career
1936	England	1	(0)

Managerial career
- 1950–1951: Grimsby Town (caretaker)
- * Club domestic league appearances and goals

George Jacob Tweedy (8 January 1913 – 23 April 1987) was an English footballer who played as a goalkeeper. He was a one club player for Grimsby Town and earned one cap for England.

He played 347 league games in a World War II interrupted career spanning 20 years. He is considered to be Grimsby's "best ever goalkeeper".

== Club career ==
Born in the rural mining town of Willington, County Durham, Tweedy first played for Durham Schools and then his hometown club Willington F. C. He made his debut for Grimsby against Bradford City on 19 November 1932 upon the replacement of Read, the regular goalkeeper, who had a broken finger. At the time of his debut, Grimsby had just been relegated from the First Division, they rejoined the top division in Tweedy's second season with the club by winning the Second Division championship. This led to six consecutive seasons in the top division, two FA Cup semi finals, the club's highest ever league ranking as fifth and Tweedy winning his only England cap. He went on to miss the second FA Cup semi-final to an injury and was replaced by Moulson, who also injured himself during that semi-final match.

=== World War hiatus ===
During the Second World War, players played in teams close to where they were stationed and this gave Tweedy the chance to play with Grimsby Town until 1942. However, most of the team including keeper Tweedy were eventually sent off to battle and this left the remaining team with a mixture of untried young players and guests. Tweedy's replacement in goal was, once again, George Moulson who left for Lincoln County upon Tweedy's return in 1946. Tweedy played as a guest for both Arsenal and Hibernian in the intervening years. After World War 2, Grimsby managed only two more seasons in the First Division and have never regained such a status since. Keeper Tweedy is also the second of three Grimsby players to be capped by England whilst playing for the club.

He retired as a player in 1950 to become assistant manager with Grimsby, and from July 1950 to January 1951, stayed with the team as caretaker manager. He returned as a player for a small time period in late 1951, before finally retiring on 3 April 1953.

== International career ==
George played his only game for England on 2 December 1936 at Highbury against Hungary. England won 6–2 in front of a crowd of around 36,000 people. He was prevented from acquiring more caps by being in competition with fellow goalkeepers Woodley (19 caps) of Chelsea and Hibbs (25 caps) of Birmingham.

== Career statistics ==
Appearances and goals by club, season and competition
Club	Season	League			Cup		Total	
Club	Season	Division	Apps	Goals	Apps	Goals	Apps	Goals
Grimsby; Town	1932–33	Second Division	9	0	1	0	10	0
Grimsby; Town	1933–34	Second Division	12	0	1	0	13	0
Grimsby; Town	1934–35	First Division	42	0	1	0	43	0
Grimsby; Town	1935–36	First Division	41	0	6	0	47	0
Grimsby; Town	1936–37	First Division	42	0	4	0	46	0
Grimsby; Town	1937–38	First Division	40	0	2	0	42	0
Grimsby; Town	1938–39	First Division	38	0	6	0	44	0
Grimsby; Town	1939–40	First Division	3	0	0	0	3	0
Grimsby; Town	World War II							
Grimsby; Town	1946–47	First Division	39	0	3	0	42	0
Grimsby; Town	1947–48	First Division	36	0	1	0	37	0
Grimsby; Town	1948–49	Second Division	15	0	0	0	15	0
Grimsby; Town	1949–50	Second Division	1	0	0	0	1	0
Grimsby; Town	Retired							
Grimsby; Town	1951–52	Third Division (North)	24	0	0	0	24	0
Grimsby; Town	1952–53	Third Division (North)	8	0	0	0	8	0
Career total			347	0	25	0	372	0

== Honours ==
Grimsby Town

- Second Division: 1934
- Third Division North runners-up: 1952
