= Peter Machin =

Peter Machin may refer to:

- Peter Machin (footballer) (1883–?), English footballer
- Peter Machin (darts player) (born 1973), Australian darts player
