= Ernest Miller (disambiguation) =

Ernest Miller is an actor and former professional wrestler.

Ernest Miller may also refer to:

- George Miller (soccer, born 1927) (Ernest George Miller), South African footballer
- Punch Miller (1894–1971), American musician
- Ernest Miller (victim), one of Jeffrey Dahmer's victims
- Ernest Miller (cinematographer) (1885–1957), American cinematographer
- Ernest M. Miller, justice of the Iowa Supreme Court
- Ernest Miller (politician) (1869–1924), Canadian politician
- Ernest R. Miller, American educator and coach of football, basketball, and baseball
