= Symm =

Symm or Symms is a surname. Notable people with the surname include:

- Colin Symm (born 1946), English footballer
- Robert Symms (1931–2014), American photographer
- Steve Symms (1938–2024), American politician and lobbyist

== See also ==
- Symm v. United States
