= George Millar =

George Millar may refer to:

- George Millar (writer) (1910–2005), awarded the MC for his escape during World War II which he wrote about in Horned Pigeon
- George Millar (footballer) (1874–?), Scottish footballer
- George Millar (singer), singer, songwriter and guitarist with The Irish Rovers

== See also ==
- George Miller (disambiguation)
- Georgy Millyar
