= George A. Miller =

George A. Miller may refer to:

- George Abram Miller (1863-1951), mathematician
- George Armitage Miller (1920–2012), professor of psychology
- George Arthur Miller (1867–1935), British Olympic polo player

== See also ==
- George Miller (disambiguation)
