= William Clarke (footballer, fl. 1897–1900) =

Association footballer

Personal information
- Full name: William Clarke
- Positions: Inside left; forward

Senior career*
Years	Team	Apps	(Gls)
1897–1898	Aberdeen	8	(4)
1898–1900	Lincoln City	35	(7)
- * Club domestic league appearances and goals

William Clarke (fl. 1897–1900), also known as Billy Clark, was a professional footballer who made 35 appearances in the Football League for Lincoln City in the late 1890s. Before joining Lincoln, he spent a season with Aberdeen, a predecessor of the modern Aberdeen F.C. He played mainly as an inside left.

== Career ==
During the 1897–98 Scottish season, Clarke (who was then referred to as Billy Clark) scored 4 goals from 8 appearances for Aberdeen in the Northern League. He signed for English Second Division club Lincoln City in July 1898. Upon his move to Lincoln he was described as "playing a grand game when in the humour" by Aberdeen's Bon-Accord newspaper.

Clarke was signed to play as an outside left and it was noted that he could also play as a centre forward and at inside left. According to the Lincolnshire Echo, "a considerable sum was paid for his transfer." Clarke was a regular in Lincoln's team in his first season, appearing in 30 of the 34 Second Division matches. He began at outside left, with George Fern inside him, but after five matches the two changed places. He was ever-present in the side until a match against Manchester City at Hyde Road in February 1899: with the scores level at half-time, Lincoln's defence held out for much of the second half, but the hosts scored twice late on, provoking "a degree of unpleasantness, which led to Clarke fouling an opponent badly and being ordered off the field." During April, he played four times in the half-back line.

He appeared infrequently in the first half of the 1899–1900 season, and had taken his totals to 7 goals from 35 league appearances by January 1900, when Lincoln cancelled his contract and paid his train fare back to the Scottish borders where he had been working over the summer. The Echo described him as a "rather erratic forward" who "could play when he liked, but the trouble was that he so rarely liked".
