= Hebburn Argyle A.F.C. =

- Full name: Hebburn Argyle Association Football Club
- Nickname: the Highlanders
- Founded: 1882
- Dissolved: 1919
- Ground: Ellison Ground
Home colours

Hebburn Argyle Association Football Club was a football club based in Hebburn, Tyne and Wear, England.

== History ==
=== Original club ===
The club was originally established in 1882 as St Aloysius Juniors, named after St Aloysius Church adjacent to their ground. The club was renamed Hebburn Argyle shortly after its foundation.

The club joined the Northern Alliance in 1893, and was league champions in 1896–97, an exceptional season amidst a run of mid-table finishes. Its best run in the FA Cup came in 1898–99 when it reached the final qualifying round (the equivalent of the 2nd round proper today), but went down to Jarrow in a replay, who were subsequently drawn to visit Everton.

The club ceased operations during the War, but, apart from friendlies in December 1918, never re-emerged; the club was entered for the 1919–20 FA Cup, but in July 1919 its ground was taken over to form part of a new shipyard, and that ended the club's existence.

=== Revivals of name ===
A Hebburn Argyle Football Club existed in the 1930s, and a further side disbanded in the 1990s. A youth club was set up by Trevor Wood in 2012, which is associated with Hebburn Town.

== Colours ==
The club originally wore white but by the mid-1900s had changed to blue and white striped shirts with dark (probably navy serge) shorts.

== Ground ==
The club's original ground was located on Argyle Street. In 1888 it moved to an enclosed ground nearby, and in 1899 the club moved to the Ellison Ground off James Street, with the opening match attracting 4,000 spectators. The ground was named for club patron Col. Ralph Carr-Ellison.

== Notable players ==
Hebburn Argyle players that went on to play professional football include:

- Bob Barnshaw
- Pat Burke
- Tom Cain
- Joe Clark
- Billy Cook
- Jack English
- Peter Mackin
- Arthur Metcalf
- Alec Milne
- Alec Ormiston
- Alex Rainnie
- Peter Ronald
- Billy Silto
- Jackie Smith

== Honours ==
- Northern Alliance
  - Champions 1896–97
