= Pat Burke (association footballer) =

English footballer (1889–1942)

Personal information
- Full name: Patrick Burke
- Date of birth: 27 December 1889
- Place of birth: Hebburn, England
- Date of death: 28 January 1942 (aged 52)
- Height: 5 ft 7 in (1.70 m)
- Position: Right half

Senior career*
Years	Team	Apps	(Gls)
19??–1912	Hebburn Argyle		
1912–1921	Blackpool	19	(0)
1921	Darlington	2	(0)
- * Club domestic league appearances and goals

Patrick Burke MM (27 December 1889 – 28 January 1942), commonly known as Pat or Paddy Burke, was an English professional footballer. A right half or left half, he played in the Football League for Blackpool and Darlington either side of the First World War.

== Life and career ==
Burke was born in Hebburn, County Durham, in 1889. His father, Thomas, was an Irish shipyard labourer; his mother, Annie, was a local girl. The 1911 Census finds the 21-year-old Burke living in Hebburn with his parents and four younger brothers, working for shipbuilders Hawthorne Leslie as an engine fitter's labourer.

By March 1911, Burke was playing North-Eastern League football for Hebburn Argyle, and at the end of the 1911–12 season, he was one of several Hebburn players to join Football League clubs when he signed for Blackpool. He made his first-team debut on 22 March 1913, standing in for the injured Tom Heslop at left half in a draw at home to Bristol City in the Second Division, and played twice the following season.

Burke had joined the Territorial Force in 1908 – at which time he stood only 5 ft 3 3/4 in (1.62 m) in height – and committed to service in the Royal Field Artillery as soon as the First World War began. He served in France, rose to the rank of sergeant, was twice wounded, and in 1917 was awarded the Military Medal. When the medal was presented to Burke the following March, he also received a gold watch from the Local Heroes' Fund, and the supporters of Hebburn Argyle subscribed for a silver tea service and a gold brooch for his wife. His discharge papers described him as brown-haired, blue-eyed, with a fresh complexion, and having grown to 5 ft 7 in (1.70 m).

After the war he returned to Blackpool, where he was reported to be popular with supporters and team-mates alike. A March 1920 feature in the Fleetwood Chronicle dubbed him "a half-back with a brain", and reckoned only a lack of physique kept "one of Blackpool's cleverest half-backs" out of a regular place in the first eleven. He "could not truthfully be called a strong player, but what he lacks in bulk and bustle he more than atones for by the cleverness of his play. He is tricky in defence, but perhaps his best work lies in his excellent co-operation with the wing in front of him, for he is seldom far behind when the advance guard is pressing." He made nine appearances in the 1919–20 season, and had a run of seven matches early in 1920–21, but lost his place and was not selected again. Burke returned to his native County Durham where he signed for Darlington of the newly formed Football League Third Division North in July 1921. He played for their reserves in the North-Eastern League, but appeared only twice for the first team, and was not retained at the end of the season.

The 1939 Register finds Burke working as a grinder and living in Wordsworth Avenue, Hebburn, with his wife Elizabeth and one adult son. He was still resident at that address when he died in January 1942.
