= Clogheen, County Tipperary =

Clogheen An Chloichín or Cloichín an Mhargaidh
- Village
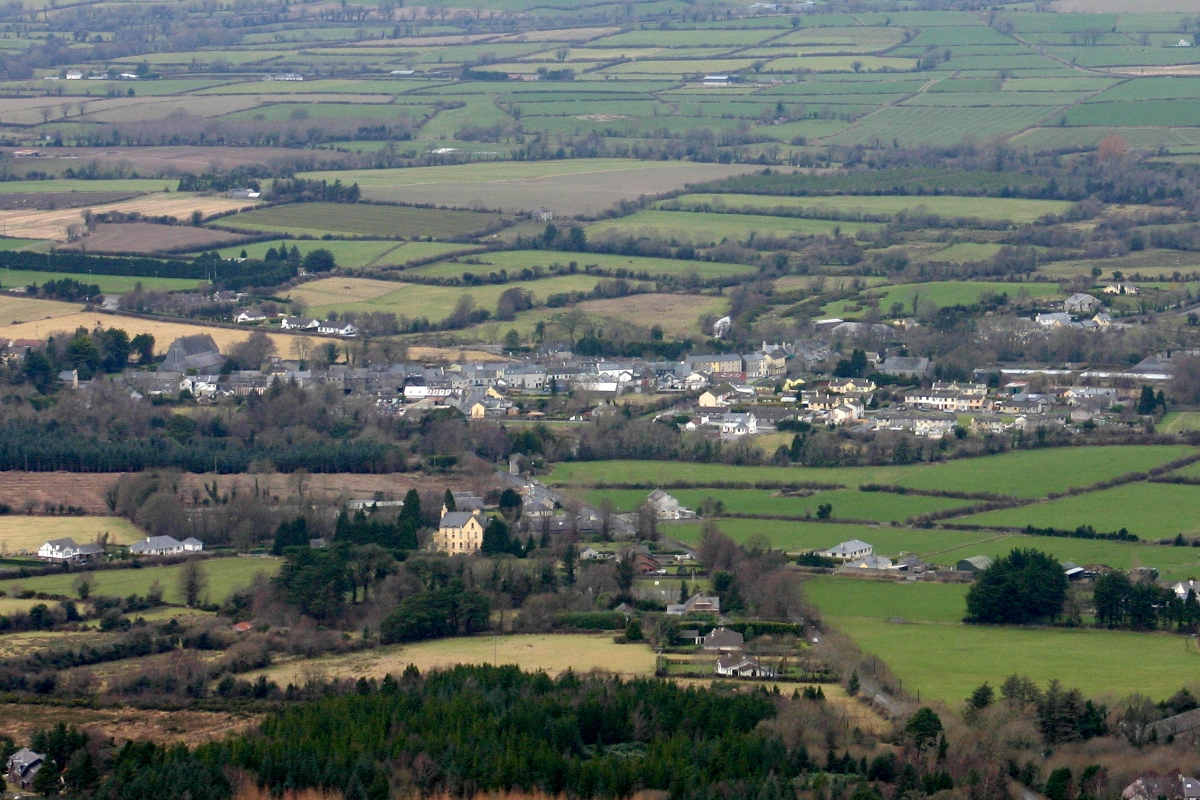
- Clogheen seen from the Knockmealdown Mountains

- Location in Ireland
- Coordinates: 52.276°N 7.996°W
- Country: Ireland
- Province: Munster
- County: County Tipperary
- Dáil Éireann: Tipperary South
- Elevation: 54 m (177 ft)

Population (2016)
  - Total: 478
- Dialing code: 0 52, +000 353 (0)52
- Irish Grid Reference: S001137

Clogheen (Irish: Cloichín an Mhargaidh, meaning 'Little Stone of the Market') is a village in County Tipperary, Ireland. The 2016 census recorded the population at 478 people.

Historical population
Year	Pop.	±%
1821	1,633	—
1831	1,928	+18.1%
1841	2,049	+6.3%
1851	1,564	−23.7%
1861	1,347	−13.9%
1871	1,317	−2.2%
1881	1,209	−8.2%
1891	915	−24.3%
1901	914	−0.1%
1911	734	−19.7%
1926	641	−12.7%
1936	479	−25.3%
1946	498	+4.0%
1951	505	+1.4%
1956	621	+23.0%
1961	576	−7.2%
1966	572	−0.7%
1971	530	−7.3%
1981	536	+1.1%
1986	502	−6.3%
1991	499	−0.6%
1996	518	+3.8%
2002	550	+6.2%
2006	509	−7.5%
2016	478	−6.1%

== Location ==
It lies in the Galtee-Vee Valley with the Galtee Mountains to the north and the Knockmealdowns in close proximity to the south. The River Tar which is a tributary of the Suir runs through the village. It is located on the R665 and R668 regional roads. The nearest large towns are Cahir and Mitchelstown, approximately 14 and 20 kilometres away, respectively.

== History ==
The first substantial records of the village date from the Cromwellian period, but the village did not come to note until the 18th and 19th centuries. It then became a local centre of trade and commerce. The village takes its modern form from the 19th century with a wide area that was formerly the Market Square (and still named so) and a number of townhouses in the Georgian style. Evidence of its former economic activity exists in the form of a number of ruined mills and accompanying mill-streams in the environs of the village, as well as several large estates.

A former Catholic parish priest of Clogheen, Nicholas Sheehy, is buried at Shanrahan graveyard just outside the village, having been executed in 1766. Sheehy had been a vocal opponent of Anglican Church tithes. When a secret oath-bound society known as the Whiteboys, formed in the parish, elements of the Protestant Ascendancy conspired to make him an example to those who questioned or threatened their powers. After a kangaroo trial in Clonmel, he was hanged for murder and treason, crimes with little basis, no reliable witnesses, and no proof.

The stately Shanbally Castle was situated 4.5 kilometres outside the village. It was built circa 1820 for the 1st Viscount Lismore, designed by the architect John Nash, and was demolished by the State in 1960.

Daniel O'Connell addressed a crowd of up to 50,000 people in the town on 28 September 1828, as part of a public demonstration to demand Catholic emancipation.

Lewis' Topographical Dictionary of 1837 notes Clogheen as being located in the barony of Iffa and Offa West and reported that there were 1,928 inhabitants, a military barracks for the accommodation of two troops of cavalry, an extensive brewery, plus seven flour mills in the town and neighbourhood.

Clogheen gained national notoriety in 2000 when a former hotel, which was due to house refugees, was damaged by fire in an arson attack. The event reputedly inspired the Gerry Stembridge television film, Black Day at Black Rock.

== Transport ==
During the week, the area is served five times a day in each direction by Bus Éireann route 245 linking it to Clonmel, Mitchelstown, Fermoy and Cork. At the weekend there are three buses each way. The number 18 runs direct from Dublin city.

== Notable people ==
- Nan Joyce, the Irish Travellers' rights activist, was born here in 1940.
- Con Moulson (1906–1989), Irish international footballer
- George Moulson (1914–1994), Irish international footballer
- Reginald Polecarew, army officer
- Edward Sackville-West, music critic

== Gallery ==
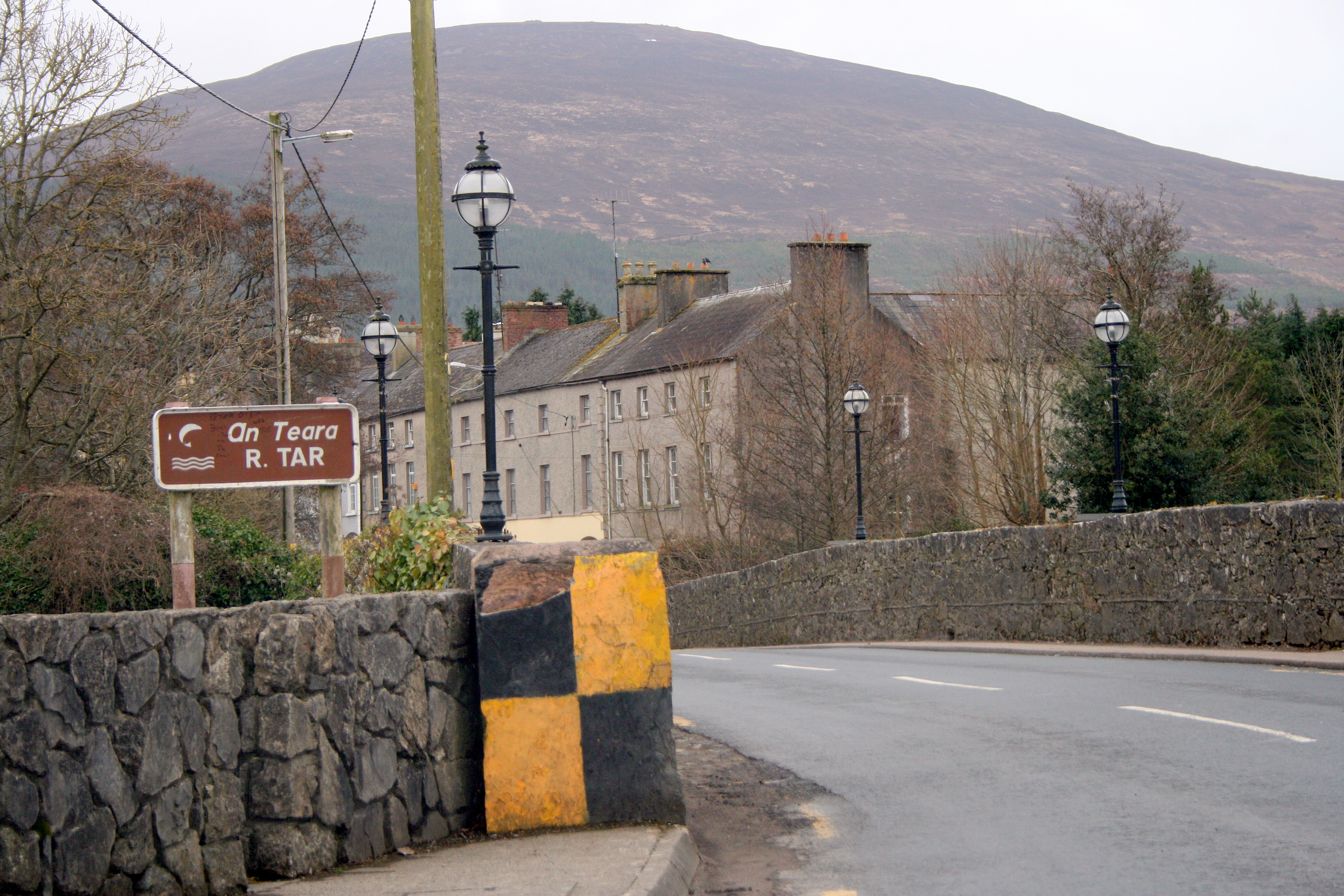
Junction of R668 and R665 roads in Clogheen

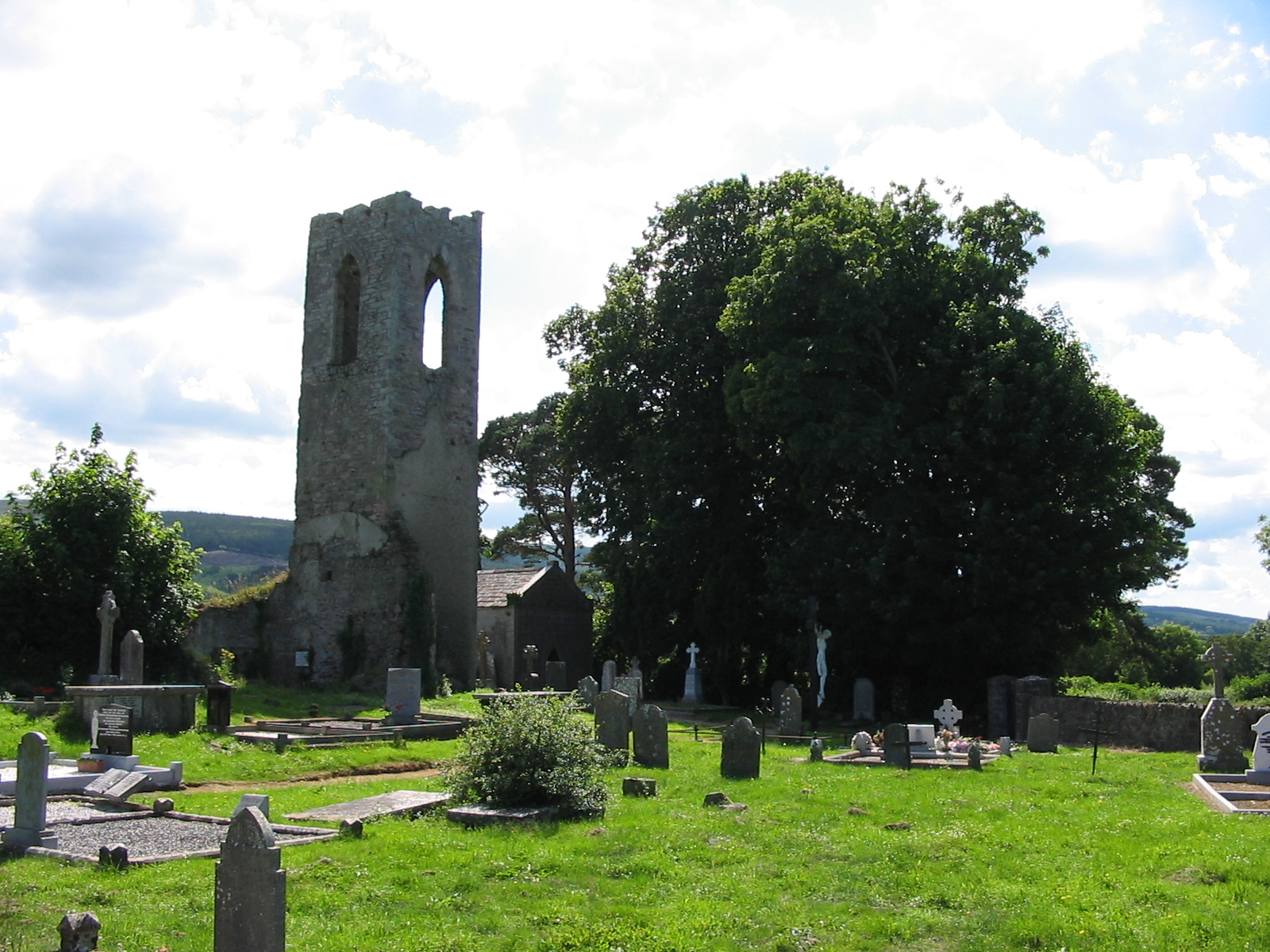
Shanrahan Graveyard, where Nicholas Sheehy is buried

== See also ==
- List of towns and villages in Ireland
