= Bill Sissons =

English footballer (1901–1988)

Personal information
- Full name: William Stanley Sissons
- Date of birth: 1 February 1901
- Place of birth: Kiveton Park, England
- Date of death: 28 June 1988 (aged 87)
- Place of death: Lincoln, England
- Height: 5 ft 9 in (1.75 m)
- Position: Goalkeeper

Senior career*
Years	Team	Apps	(Gls)
19??–1924	Anston Athletic		
1924–1927	Lincoln City	74	(0)
- * Club domestic league appearances and goals

William Stanley Sissons (1 February 1901 – 28 June 1988) was an English footballer who made 74 appearances in the Football League playing as a goalkeeper for Lincoln City. His career ended at the age of 25 when he suffered a badly broken arm.

== Life and career ==
Sissons was born in Kiveton Park, Yorkshire, in 1901, the son of Samuel, a coal miner, and his wife, Sarah Ann (Annie). By the time of the 1911 Census, Sissons' father had died, and he and his two sisters were living with their widowed mother.

By early 1923, Sissons was playing local football for Anston Athletic, as well as cricket for Kiveton Park Colliery: he helped that club win the Bassetlaw League title for the first time in 1926. After trials with Football League club Lincoln City, he signed professional forms ahead of the 1924–25 season. After starting goalkeeper Bernard Wrigley conceded four goals in each of Lincoln's third and fourth matches, Sissons, who had impressed for the reserves in the Midland League, replaced him for the Third Division North match away to Crewe Alexandra on 17 September, and was ever-present for the rest of the season. He was undisputed first choice through the 1925–26 season, and signed on again for the next, but lost his place to the giant Albert Iremonger, released by Notts County after 21 years and 564 League appearances. In mid-September 1926, Sissons broke both bones of his forearm during a reserve match, and was expected to be out for at least a couple of months. The arm did not heal well – a year later, after several operations, he was still receiving treatment – and his professional career was at an end.

In 1936, Sissons married Elsie Johnson. They settled in Winterton, Lincolnshire, where Sissons ran a fish and chip shop. During the Second World War he served as an ARP warden. In the 1950s and 1960s, Sissons and his wife ran the post office and general stores in nearby Langworth. Sissons died in Lincoln in 1988 at the age of 87; he and his wife are buried in Nettleham Cemetery.

Sissons' cousin, Albert Sissons, and Albert's son Graham both played football professionally.
