= Alex Rainnie =

Scottish footballer

Personal information
- Full name: Alexander Rainnie
- Date of birth: 22 June 1891
- Place of birth: Seafield, Banffshire, Scotland
- Date of death: 1965 (aged 73)
- Place of death: County Durham, England
- Height: 5 ft 7 in (1.70 m)
- Position: Wing half

Senior career*
Years	Team	Apps	(Gls)
- Hebburn Argyle
- South Shields
1919–1920	Newcastle United	1	(0)
1920–1922	Darlington	8	(0)
1923–1924	Ashington	1	(0)
- * Club domestic league appearances and goals

Alexander Rainnie (22 June 1891 – 1965) was a Scottish footballer who played as a wing half in the Football League for Newcastle United, Darlington and Ashington. He also played non-league football for Hebburn Argyle and South Shields.

== Football career ==
Rainnie played football as a wing half for North Eastern League clubs Hebburn Argyle before the First World War and for South Shields after it. Described as a "resourceful right half", he signed for Football League club Newcastle United ahead of the 1919–20 season, but played mainly for their reserve team in the North Eastern League. He appeared only once for the first team, in a 4–0 defeat at Everton on 24 January 1920 in the First Division, and moved back to the North Eastern League with Darlington for 1920–21.

He helped Darlington win the North Eastern League title, which contributed to their election to the newly formed Northern Section of the Football League Third Division. He made eight appearances in the League, without scoring, and played for them until at least 1922. He made one appearance for Ashington in the 1923–24 Football League season.

== Personal life ==
Rainnie was born in Seafield, Banffshire, in Scotland, the son of William Thompson Rainnie, a shipwright, and his wife, Isabella née Legg. He was raised in England, in Hebburn, County Durham, where he attended Hebburn Quay School. He was apprenticed as a shipwright, and served in that trade in the Royal Naval Volunteer Reserve during the First World War; in 1915 he was serving on HMS Conqueror.

Rainnie married Isabella Prentice in South Shields in 1924. The couple are listed on the 1939 Register as living in Hebburn; Rainnie was working as a safety inspector and serving as an ARP Warden. He died in County Durham in 1965 at the age of 73.
