= Nan Joyce =

Irish Travellers' rights activist (1940–2018)

- Nan Joyce in 1982
- Born: Ann O'Donoghue; 1940; Clogheen, Ireland
- Died: 7 August 2018 (aged 77–78)
- Known for: Traveller rights activism
- Spouse: John Joyce
- Children: 11
- Parent(s): John O'Donoghue; Nan McCann

Ann "Nan" Joyce (née O'Donoghue, 1940 – 7 August 2018) was an Irish Travellers' rights activist. She worked to improve the lives of Travellers in Ireland and Northern Ireland from 1981 until her death in 2018. She was the first Traveller candidate in an Irish general election, in 1982.

== Family life ==
Joyce was born Ann O'Donoghue in Clogheen, County Tipperary, in 1940. She was the second of nine children and her parents were John O'Donoghue, a horse trainer, and Nan McCann. Her father was an avid reader who taught his children the history of landmarks and castles they saw on their travels. He read medical works which enabled him to treat many of the illnesses of his children. He spoke Cant, and could read and write in Irish and English. His wife was illiterate.

Joyce's father died in a police cell when she was twelve, and her mother was sent to prison for theft committed to support her family. Joyce took over the role of mother and roamed the country with her siblings. Some years later, she married a Traveller, John Joyce, and they had eleven children.

She endured many hardships including prejudice and intolerance, as well as living by roadsides with no facilities, exposed to severe weather, leading to illness and despair. The conditions led two of her daughters to have nervous breakdowns and they were committed to hospitals. Another daughter contracted severe lead poisoning when batteries were dumped at their camp, and she entered long-term care. People dumped their rubbish at Joyce's camp during the 1982 bin-collector's strike, which attracted rats, leading to the death of her one-year-old granddaughter, who caught meningitis from them.

She lived for a time in Clondalkin before moving to Tallaght where she began her public life, and later lived in Belfast, where she continued to work for Travellers' rights and well-being.

== Public activism ==
=== Entry into public life ===
Joyce's family from her marriage were living at a halting site in Clondalkin when they were forced out in 1981 by Dublin County Council bulldozers. They moved to Tallaght where Joyce enrolled her children at school. While the family was settling into their new surroundings, the county council tried to open the new Tallaght By-pass, where over a hundred Traveller families lived, without fulfilling their legal obligation to offer them an alternative site. (Note: A Traveller, Roselle McDonald, won a court ruling in 1980 that Travellers could not be evicted from local authority property without being offered a suitable alternative, although the authorities side-stepped the ruling by harassment such as dumping rubbish and manure beside Traveller homes, causing them to move away.) Some angry locals from the settled community threatened the Joyces and other Traveller families, giving them an ultimatum to quit the area.

When they refused to move, hostile locals, with the support of some community politicians, organized a vigilante mob to patrol all open space in the area, and they visited the Traveller camp to intimidate them by wielding hurleys and shouting "Out! Out! Out!", which terrified elderly Travellers and children. Some of the settled Tallaght locals came to the Travellers' defence and stood with them. Broadcaster Gay Byrne also supported them and transmitted his radio programme from the halting site. This gave Joyce her first opportunity to speak publicly on behalf of her community about the injustices they endured.

She read the local papers regularly and was disturbed by how they misrepresented the Traveller community: "I wouldn't wonder for the settled people to be against us because they were hearing nothing but bad about us," she said. She wrote a Travellers' manifesto describing their needs and delivered it to all the local newspaper offices. She was part of a group of Travellers and settled people who created the Travellers' Rights Committee and held meetings at her home to involve other Travellers. She gave talks around the country to schools, colleges, and convents to educate people about Traveller history and heritage. She and the Travellers' Rights Committee led marches and pickets, and some of these agitations were conducted outside the Dáil. The first Travellers' rights organisation, called Mincéir Misli, evolved from the Travellers' Rights Committee in 1983, and Joyce continued her work with them.

=== Election campaign ===
Joyce was selected by the committee to run as a candidate in the general election of November 1982, in Dublin South-West, becoming the first Traveller to compete for a Dáil seat. She made a documentary for the BBC during her election campaign to improve her support. She petitioned people for votes in the streets of Dublin, wearing a hidden microphone and while being secretly filmed. She received many good wishes but also met people who told her that Travellers were "dirt" and "filth" and "should be burned". Another constituency candidate, Richard O'Reilly, ran to oppose her on an anti-Traveller platform using the slur, "Get the knackers out of Tallaght" as his campaign slogan. Joyce was not elected but she attracted twice as many votes as O'Reilly. (Note: November 1982 general election results: Nan Joyce: 581 first preference votes; Richard O'Reilly: 297 votes.)

Shortly after the election, she was arrested and wrongly charged with theft of jewellery. The case attracted widespread publicity but the charges were dropped in court for lack of evidence, although her confidence was damaged. Many believed she was framed because of her campaigning.

=== Speech to international gathering ===
She attended a Trócaire seminar in Galway in 1983 where she impressed her seminar group which included Nobel Peace Prize-winner, Seán MacBride, and she was selected as chairperson to represent them. She delivered a speech to thousands of attending bishops and humanitarians from all over the world: "You people are very concerned about the Third World. I think you should also be concerned about us, we are the fourth world. We live among rats in camps or caravans ... our children suffer from as many diseases as the children of the Third World." She received a standing ovation, and The Irish Times reported that, "Mrs Joyce had an extraordinary impact on the seminar, receiving more applause than anyone else who presented reports."

=== Belfast ===
She later moved to Belfast for a number of years. There, she created a group to fight for Travellers' rights and lobbied successfully for new halting sites in West Belfast with a fresh water supply, toilets, a playschool, and a clinic for babies. She continued her school visits in the area to explain how important it was that Traveller children learned about their culture and heritage. These visits influenced the schools' use of teaching materials and course content to address Traveller children directly.

=== Legacy ===
Joyce was one of the best-known Irish Travellers. She pioneered the cause of Travellers' rights and heightened awareness of the many hidden problems they faced. The existence of the Travellers' Rights Committee in the 1980s fostered many offshoot organizations dedicated to the needs of Travellers. She published Traveller: an autobiography in 1985, which has received scholarly attention, and was the subject of a chapter in a study of influential Irish women, Mná na hÉireann: Women who Shaped Ireland, in 2009.

== Bibliography ==
- Joyce, Nan (1985). Farmar, Anna (ed.). Traveller: an autobiography. Dublin: Gill and Macmillan. ISBN 978-0-7171-1388-0.
- Nicola Depuis (2009). "Chapter 21: Nan Joyce". Mná na hÉireann: Women who Shaped Ireland. Cork: Mercier Press. pp. 117–123. ISBN 978-1-85635-645-9.
