= Harry Sillito =

English footballer

Personal information
- Full name: Henry Sillito
- Date of birth: 1 July 1901
- Place of birth: Chester-le-Street, County Durham, England
- Date of death: 17 December 1993 (aged 92)
- Place of death: Lincoln, Lincolnshire, England
- Height: 5 ft 6 in (1.68 m)
- Position: Outside left

Senior career*
| Years | Team | Apps | (Gls) |
| – | Chester-le-Street | | |
| – | Washington Colliery | | |
| 1921–1922 | Chelsea | 0 | (0) |
| 1922–1924 | Lincoln City | 48 | (2) |
| 1924–1928 | Merthyr Town | 19 | (0) |
| 1928–1929 | Grantham | | |
- * Club domestic league appearances and goals

Henry Sillito (1 July 1901 – 17 December 1993) was an English footballer who made 67 appearances in the Football League playing for Lincoln City and Merthyr Town. He played as an outside left. He began his career in non-league football in his native north-east of England with Chester-le-Street and Washington Colliery, and was on the books of Chelsea, without representing that club in the league, before finishing his career in the Midland League with Grantham.
