= James Mullineux =

English footballer

Personal information
- Date of birth: 1872
- Place of birth: Blackburn, England
- Date of death: Unknown
- Position: Wing half

Senior career*
Years	Team	Apps	(Gls)
- Lincoln City
1892–1895	Burnley	26	(0)
1895	Burton Wanderers	1	(0)
- * Club domestic league appearances and goals

James E. B. Mullineux (1872 – unknown) was an English professional footballer who played as a wing half.
