= George Miller (footballer, born 1980) =

Liberian footballer

Personal information
- Date of birth: 22 November 1980 (age 45)
- Place of birth: Tripoli, Libya
- Position: Striker

Senior career*
Years	Team	Apps	(Gls)
2000–2002	Braga	19	(0)
2002–2003	St Patrick's Athletic		
2003	Crumlin United		
2004–2007	Mighty Barrolle		

International career
2000–2005	Liberia	4	(0)
- * Club domestic league appearances and goals

George Miller (born 22 November 1980) is a Liberian former footballer who played at both professional and international levels as a striker.

== Career ==
Born in Tripoli, Libya, Miller played club football in Portugal, Ireland and Liberia for Braga, St Patrick's Athletic, Crumlin United and Mighty Barrolle.

He also earned four caps for the Liberian national side, three of which came in FIFA World Cup qualifying matches.
