= Phil Daley (footballer) =

English footballer

Personal information
- Date of birth: 12 April 1967 (age 59)
- Place of birth: Walton, England
- Position: Forward

Senior career*
Years	Team	Apps	(Gls)
- Newton
1989–1994	Wigan Athletic	161	(39)
1994–1996	Lincoln City	32	(5)
- Bangor City
1996	TPS	2	(0)
- * Club domestic league appearances and goals

Phil Daley (born 12 April 1967) is a former footballer who played as a forward in the Football League.

He started his League career at Wigan Athletic in 1989, joining the club from semi-professional side Newton in the West Cheshire League. He made 161 league appearances for the club, scoring 39 goals, and was voted as the club's Player of the Year for the 1991–92 season.

In August 1994 he moved to Lincoln City.
