= Magnus O'Donnell =

English footballer

Personal information
- Place of birth: Willington Quay, Northumberland, England
- Position: Inside left

Senior career*
Years	Team	Apps	(Gls)
–	Wallsend Park Villa		
1904–1906	Lincoln City	45	(11)
1906–1907	Barnsley	19	(2)
- Newark Town
- Grantham Avenue
- Castleford Town
- * Club domestic league appearances and goals

Magnus O'Donnell (fl. 1882—1907) was an English footballer who scored 13 goals from 64 appearances in the Football League playing for Lincoln City and Barnsley. He played as an inside left. He also played non-league football for Wallsend Park Villa, Newark Town, Grantham Avenue and Castleford Town.
