= George Miller (footballer, born 1945) =

Scottish footballer (born 1945)

George Miller (born 27 March 1945) is a Scottish former footballer who played as a wing-half.

== Career ==
Miller was brought up in Greenock and played for St Johnstone F.C. from 1965 to 1970, having transferred there from Dalry Thistle F.C. After making 68 appearances and scoring zero goals for St Johnstone, he transferred to Brechin City F.C. where he played for two seasons. Later he managed junior outfit, the Jeanfield Swifts F.C. in Perth.

Whilst he played for St Johnstone, he famously scored not one, but two own goals in the Scottish League Cup semi-final against Dundee F.C. on 11 October 1967. After the embarrassment of the game, he was told by the manager, Willie Ormond, to "go and get drunk" to try and forget the match.
