= Craig Stones =

English former footballer (born 1980)

Personal information
- Date of birth: 31 May 1980 (age 46)
- Place of birth: Scunthorpe, England
- Height: 5 ft 11 in (1.80 m)
- Position: Midfielder

Senior career*
Years	Team	Apps	(Gls)
1996–2000	Lincoln City	21	(0)
1999–2000	→ Grantham Town (loan)		
2000–2001	Spalding United		
2000–2003	Brigg Town		
2002–2003	Gainsborough Trinity		
2002–2007	Brigg Town		
2006–2009	Sleaford Town		
2009–2010	Bottesford Town		
2010–2011	Sleaford Town		
- * Club domestic league appearances and goals as of 01:57, 23 December 2008 (UTC)

Craig Stones (born 31 May 1980) is an English former professional footballer who played as a midfielder.

He notably played in the Football League for Lincoln City over a four-year period before moving into Non-league football, spending the rest of his career with Lincolnshire sides Grantham Town, Spalding United, Brigg Town, Gainsborough Trinity, Sleaford Town and Bottesford Town.

== Career ==
Stones made his Football League debut for Lincoln City as a 72nd-minute substitute for Worrell Sterling in the 4–0 home victory over Swansea City on 5 April 1997. Stones was aged just 16 years 309 days old and, at the time, the third youngest player to appear for the club in the Football League: he is currently the fourth after Jack Hobbs, Shane Nicholson and Carl Dawson. He spent the end of the 1999–2000 season on loan at Grantham Town, debuting in the 1–0 home defeat to Burton Albion on 1 April 2000 and making a total of seven league appearances for the club, scoring a solitary goal in the 6–0 home victory over Atherstone United on 8 April 2000. It was no surprise that, after just 21 league appearances in three seasons as a professional, he was released by the Sincil Bank based club at the end of season.

He dropped out of professional football to sign with Spalding United before moving onto Brigg Town in March 2001. Having spent some time with the club during the pre-season in November 2002 Stones signed for Gainsborough Trinity who were under the command of his former Lincoln coach Phil Stant. He made his Northern Premier League debut for the club in the 2–1 home victory over Colwyn Bay on 23 November 2002 and made a further eight league appearances, scoring a single goal in the 4–2 home victory over Worksop Town on 26 December 2002, before returning to Brigg Town in February 2003. He helped Brigg to secure the FA Vase that season, appearing in the 2–1 final victory over AFC Sudbury at Boleyn Ground on 10 May 2003.

He moved to Sleaford Town in November 2006. Stones was forced to miss the entire 2007–2008 season after breaking his leg in two places just two minutes into a friendly with Lincoln Moorlands Railway on 7 July 2007, the first fixture at Sleaford's new Eslaforde Park ground. He returned to fitness ahead of the 2008–2009 season. He departed Sleaford Town in July 2009 to link up with his one-time Brigg Town manager Ralph Clayton at Bottesford Town. He remained with the club for a single season before returning to Sleaford Town ahead of the 2010–11 season.

== Personal life ==
Stones works as a branch manager in the Grantham residential office of estate agents Pygott & Crone.
