= Moulon =

Moulon is the name of several communes in France:

- Moulon, Gironde, in the Gironde department
- Moulon, Loiret, in the Loiret department

== Other uses ==
- Moulin (grape), another name for the wine grape Chardonnay
