= Albert Broadbent =

English footballer

Personal information
- Full name: Albert Henry Broadbent
- Date of birth: 20 August 1934
- Place of birth: Dudley, England
- Date of death: 23 October 2006 (aged 72)
- Place of death: Sheffield, England
- Position: Left wing

Senior career*
Years	Team	Apps	(Gls)
–1953	Dudley Town		
1953–1955	Notts County	31	(11)
1955–1957	Sheffield Wednesday	81	(17)
1957–1959	Rotherham United	48	(14)
1959–1961	Doncaster Rovers	100	(20)
1961–1963	Lincoln City	38	(4)
1963–1966	Doncaster Rovers	106	(19)
1965–1967	Bradford Park Avenue	56	(11)
1966–1968	Hartlepools United	25	(3)
1968–1969	Scarborough		
- * Club domestic league appearances and goals

Albert Henry Broadbent (20 August 1934 – 23 October 2006) was an English footballer who played on the left wing. He scored 99 goals from 485 appearances in the Football League.

== Career ==
Born in Dudley, Worcestershire, Broadbent commenced his career with Dudley Town before joining Notts County in March 1952. After 11 goals in 31 games, and playing a part in the club's run to the FA Cup quarter-finals, he linked up with Sheffield Wednesday in July 1955, a fee of £6,000 securing his services. His first season for the club saw him record 12 goals as Wednesday secured the Football League Second Division title. On Christmas Eve 1957 he moved on to join Rotherham United and then on to Doncaster Rovers. In November 1961 he joined Lincoln City before returning to Doncaster Rovers in exchange for Bobby Rooney. Spells at Bradford Park Avenue and Hartlepools United ended his League career after 485 games and 99 goals.

Broadbent died in Sheffield, where he had lived since joining Sheffield Wednesday. His death was marked by a minute's silence before Doncaster Rovers' 0–0 home draw with Leyton Orient on 4 November 2006.
