= Charles Laverick =

English footballer

Personal information
- Full name: Charles Laverick
- Date of birth: 1881
- Position: Full back

Senior career*
Years	Team	Apps	(Gls)
1901–1902	Newcastle United	0	(0)
1902–1904	Doncaster Rovers (Note: Excludes appearances in the Midland League)	8	(0)
1904–1907	Lincoln City	66	(0)
- * Club domestic league appearances and goals

Charles Laverick (1881 – after 1906) was an English footballer who made 74 appearances in the Football League playing for Doncaster Rovers and Lincoln City. He played at full back. Before joining Doncaster, he was on the books of Newcastle United, but never represented them in the league.
