= Michael Dowling (footballer) =

English footballer (1890–1969)

Personal information
- Full name: Michael Dowling
- Date of birth: 30 March 1890
- Place of birth: Jarrow, England
- Date of death: 1969 (aged 79)
- Place of death: Rother Valley, Yorkshire
- Height: 5 ft 9 in (1.75 m)
- Position: Forward

Youth career
- St Bede's (Jarrow)

Senior career*
Years	Team	Apps	(Gls)
190?–1909	Jarrow Croft		
1909–1910	St Mirren		
1910–1911	The Wednesday	7	(0)
1911–1913	Portsmouth		
1913–1914	Jarrow		
1914–1920	Lincoln City	28	(4)
1920–1925	Ebbw Vale		
- * Club domestic league appearances and goals

Michael Dowling (30 March 1890 – 1969) was an English footballer who made 35 appearances in the Football League playing as a forward for The Wednesday and Lincoln City. He also played for St Mirren in the Scottish League, for Portsmouth and Ebbw Vale in the Southern League, and in non-League football for Jarrow.

== Life and career ==
Dowling was born in 1890 in Jarrow, County Durham, the son of Arthur Patrick Dowling, a merchant seaman, and his wife Catherine née Dowey. He attended St Bede's Catholic School in the town and played for St Bede's F.C.

Dowling moved on to Jarrow Croft, from where he joined Scottish First Division club St Mirren in September 1909. He played mainly at outside right, but also appeared in other forward positions, scored four goals from 16 appearances in all competitions, and St Mirren were keen to retain his services at the end of the season, but he chose to return to England. He signed for The Wednesday in May 1910, and made his English Football League debut on 17 September away to Preston North End in place of Sam Kirkman. Despite his early goal being disallowed for fouling an opponent, his team won 3–1. He played in the next three matches, once at outside right and twice at centre forward, and a further three in the second half of the season, all in the First Division.

When Wednesday's scout, Robert Brown, left to become secretary-manager of Portsmouth, newly relegated to the Second Division of the Southern League and struggling financially, Dowling and another young forward, Frank Stringfellow, went along. The pseudonymous "Athleo" of the Sheffield Sports Special "[could] not understand Dowling being allowed to go", and later described him as "a good worker with a sensible habit of popping frequently at goal." Dowling helped Portsmouth finish as runners-up in his first season, and remained with the club for a further season at the higher level, before returning to his native north-east where he signed for Jarrow, an amalgamation of the former Jarrow Croft and Jarrow Caledonians clubs.

After one season in the North-Eastern League, Dowling returned to the Football League with Lincoln City. He made 14 appearances in the Second Division, and scored his first Football League goal, on 17 April 1915 in a 2–1 defeat away to Bristol City. His ability to play in any forward position made him valuable cover for Jack Manning, Arthur Wolstenholme or Frank Pattison, and he earned himself a reputation as "a dashing and assertive forward", but he was never a first choice in the side.

Dowling returned to Jarrow during the First World War where he worked in the shipyards. He married Julia Pearson in 1915, but the marriage was not a success. In 1919, she summoned him for desertion. According to her evidence, she had left him more than once because he mistreated her, and after he joined the Navy in 1918 he had stopped paying her allowance. The court ruled that there was no desertion, and made no order against Dowling. After demobilisation he rejoined Lincoln City, and made a further 14 appearances during the first post-war season, at the end of which Lincoln finished 21st and failed to be re-elected. Dowling moved on to Ebbw Vale, scored freely as they won the Southern League Welsh Section in 1921–22 and the overall Southern League title the following year, his record including four goals "in about ten minutes" as Ebbw Vale beat Abertillery 9–0 in March 1923, and was still playing for them in the 1924–25 season.

The 1939 Register finds Dowling living in Kilnhurst, Yorkshire, and working as a colliery fitter. His death at the age of 79 was registered in the Rother Valley district of Yorkshire in the last quarter of 1969.
