= William Moore (footballer) =

Irish footballer

Personal information
- Full name: William John Moore
- Date of birth: 2 August 1895
- Place of birth: Ballyclare, County Antrim, Ireland
- Date of death: 17 August 1932 (aged 37)
- Place of death: Ballyclare, Ireland
- Height: 5 ft 11 in (1.80 m)
- Position: Outside left

Senior career*
Years	Team	Apps	(Gls)
- Brantwood
1914–1920	Glentoran		
1920–1924	Falkirk	117	(5)
1924–1925	Lincoln City	33	(2)
1925–1926	Ards		
1926–1929	Glentoran		

International career
1923	Ireland	1	(0)
- * Club domestic league appearances and goals

William John Moore (2 August 1895 – 17 August 1932), sometimes known as Pal Moore, was an Ireland international footballer. He spent several years with Glentoran (in two separate spells), and also appeared in the Irish League with Ards. Away from Ireland, he made 117 appearances for Falkirk in the Scottish League First Division and played 33 games in the English Football League for Lincoln City. He played as an outside left. He played for the Ireland national team against Scotland in 1923, and appeared in a Victory International, also against Scotland, in 1919.
