= Ron Allen (footballer) =

English footballer

Personal information
- Full name: Ronald Leslie Allen
- Date of birth: 22 April 1935
- Place of birth: Birmingham, England
- Date of death: 2006 (aged 70–71)
- Position: Full back

Youth career
- Birmingham City

Senior career*
Years	Team	Apps	(Gls)
195?–1958	Birmingham City	0	(0)
1958–1961	Lincoln City	60	(1)
- * Club domestic league appearances and goals

Ronald Leslie Allen (22 April 1935 – 2006) was an English footballer who made 60 appearances in the Football League playing for Lincoln City. He played as a full back. Before joining Lincoln, he was on the books of Birmingham City for some years without playing for the first team, and his career ended because of a broken leg in December 1960.
