= Bobby Rooney =

Scottish footballer (1938–2016)

Personal information
- Full name: Robert Rooney
- Date of birth: 8 July 1938
- Place of birth: Cowie, Stirling, Scotland
- Date of death: 9 August 2016 (aged 78)
- Place of death: Portsmouth, England
- Position: Winger

Youth career
- –1958: Clydebank Juniors

Senior career*
Years	Team	Apps	(Gls)
1958–1962	Sheffield United	14	(3)
1962–1963	Doncaster Rovers	5	(1)
1963–1964	Lincoln City	28	(3)
–	Gainsborough Trinity		
- * Club domestic league appearances and goals

Robert Rooney (8 July 1938 – 9 August 2016) was a Scottish footballer, who made 47 appearances in the Football League playing for Sheffield United, Doncaster Rovers and Lincoln City. He played as a winger.

Rooney was born in Cowie, Stirling, and began his football career with Clydebank Juniors in his native Scotland before joining English Second Division club Sheffield United in 1958. He played occasionally in his first two seasons with the club, but not thereafter. In the 1962–63 season, he was registered with three clubs: Sheffield United transferred him to Doncaster Rovers for a £5,000 fee in October 1962, but exchanged him for Lincoln City's Albert Broadbent soon afterwards. Rooney made his Lincoln debut in January 1963, yet at the end of the season, Lincoln confirmed that he was one of four players available for transfer. He made his last Lincoln appearance in December 1963 before moving into English non-league football with Gainsborough Trinity.
