= David Pallister (United States Air Force officer) =

David Stanley Pallister (1915–2003) was a colonel in the U.S. Air Force and a hockey player. Pallister commanded bomber squadrons and served as a vice commander of Pease Air Force Base in New Hampshire. During his childhood, Pallister captained the first American high school hockey team to play overseas in Europe.

== Early life and education ==
Pallister was born to Claude Vincent Pallister and Hortense Pollister on January 24, 1915, and he grew up in Mountain Lakes, New Jersey. Claude Vincent Pallister served as the chief legal adviser to the Reformed Church in America. and as the first mayor of Shoreham, New York. He also served as a commodore of the Port Jefferson Yacht Club in Port Jefferson, New York on Long Island.

In 1934, Pallister graduated from the Morristown School (now Morristown-Beard School) in Morristown, New Jersey. He then earned his bachelor's degree at Dartmouth College in Hanover, New Hampshire. After graduating, Pallister attended New York Law School in Manhattan. In 1992, Morristown-Beard School elected Pallister to the school's Athletic Hall of Fame.

During high school, Pallister played forward on Morristown School's ice hockey team. (His brother, Claude V. Jr., also played on the team.) Pallister served as team captain in his senior year. He led the hockey team on an overseas trip to play hockey clubs from Germany, Switzerland, and France between December 1933 and January 1934. The rarity of this sports trip for the time led to extensive coverage in The New York Times and The Literary Digest; the United Press International story carried a headline of "Hockey Team Invades Europe". The team also received a personal telegram from President Franklin D. Roosevelt wishing them luck: "The President sends them [the players] his best wishes for their success in this new field of competition, and wishes them to know of his conviction that they will live up to the best traditions of American sportsman."

== Military career ==
Pallister enlisted with the U.S. Army Air Corps on January 20, 1942, to serve in World War II as a pilot. After the war ended, Pallister served with the New York Air National Guard. He flew B-26 Invader light bombers for the 114th Bombardment Squadron at Floyd Bennett Field. (The 114th Squadron is now the 114th Fighter Squadron of the Oregon Air National Guard.)

During the 1950s and 1960s, Pallister commanded bombing squadrons in California and Illinois. He commanded the 441st Bombardment Squadron with the 320th Bombardment Wing at March Air Force Base in California. After transferring to Orchard Place Airport (now O'Hare International Airport), Pallister commanded the 338th Bombardment Group. He then served as the assistant deputy commander for operations of the 100th Air Refueling Wing at Pease. Pallister later served as the vice commander of Pease. After returning to squadron command, Pallister commanded the 23d Tactical Air Support Squadron in the 504 Tactical Air Support Group between 1967 and 1968. The 504th provided air support for U.S. operations from Nakhon Phanom Royal Air Force Base in Thailand during the Vietnam War.

== Ship rescues ==
Pallister served as a Shoreham police officer responsible for beach patrol. In 1937, he rescued passengers of a yawl that went adrift on Long Island Sound during an intense thunderstorm. Strong winds from the storm had broken both mainmasts on the 25-foot ship during a journey from Mattituck, New York to Port Jefferson. This had left it floating haphazardly two miles from shore. After rowing a 12-foot dory (a lightweight rowboat) to the ship, Pallister threw its two passengers a connecting line. He then used his rowboat to tow the ship to shore.

At the age of 16, Pallister also participated in a rescue of three passengers of a capsized canoe near Rocky Point, New York. He and two friends were mooring their motor boat after a fishing trip when a beachgoer's telescope on North Shore beach observed the overturned canoe. Setting back out, Pallister and his friends (Gilbert Frei and Wentworth Eddy) journeyed to the canoe. They helped the canoe passengers who could not swim (because of their clothing) aboard the motorboat, and toed the canoe to the beach.

== Family ==
Pallister married Beatrice Imhoff Pallister in 1939. Beatrice Pallister worked as a professional model and volunteered with the U.S. Air Force's Family Services Department. They had two children together: David Pallister, Jr. and Sara D.
