= Bryan Stainton =

English footballer

Personal information
- Full name: Bryan Stainton
- Date of birth: 8 January 1942 (age 84)
- Place of birth: Scampton, Lincolnshire, England
- Position: Defender

Senior career*
Years	Team	Apps	(Gls)
–	Ingham		
1961–1965	Lincoln City	25	(0)
–	Gainsborough Trinity		
- * Club domestic league appearances and goals

Bryan Edward Stainton (born 8 January 1942) is an English former footballer who scored made 25 appearances in the Football League playing for Lincoln City as a defender. He also played non-league football for Ingham and for Gainsborough Trinity.
