= Archibald McFarlane =

Scottish footballer

Personal information
- Place of birth: Scotland
- Position: Right back

Senior career*
Years	Team	Apps	(Gls)
1894–1896	Lincoln City	51	(0)
1896–1897	Glossop North End		
1897–1898	Lincoln City	10	(0)
1898	Gravesend United		
1898–????	Sheppey United		
- * Club domestic league appearances and goals

Archibald E. McFarlane (fl. 1890s) was a Scottish footballer who made 61 appearances in the Football League for Lincoln City. He played at right back. He also played in the Midland League for Glossop North End, for Gravesend United, and in the Southern League for Sheppey United.
