= George Miller (soccer, born 1927) =

South African soccer player (born 1927)

Personal information
- Full name: Ernest George Miller
- Date of birth: 17 October 1927
- Place of birth: Pretoria, South Africa
- Height: 1.69 m (5 ft 7 in)
- Position: Inside forward

Senior career*
Years	Team	Apps	(Gls)
- Arcadia Shepherds
1950–1952	Leeds United	13	(1)
1952	Workington	11	(0)

International career
	South Africa	3	(2)
- * Club domestic league appearances and goals

Ernest George Miller (born 17 October 1927) is a South African former footballer who played as an inside forward.

== Football career ==
Playing for Arcadia Shepherds in his native South Africa, Miller signed for Leeds United in November 1950 on the recommendation of a friend of Leeds manager Frank Buckley. Several South African players later followed Miller to Leeds, including Ken Hastie and Gordon Stewart. Over the course of just over a calendar year, Miller made 13 Football League for Leeds, scoring once. In March 1952, Miller signed for Workington. Miller made 11 appearances at the club, before returning to South Africa. Miller scored twice in three appearances for South Africa during his career.

== Baseball ==
Miller also represented South Africa in baseball, playing against an Amateur USA team in 1955 and 1956.
