= Gardner Hannah =

Scottish footballer

Personal information
- Full name: Gardner Hannah
- Date of birth: 4 February 1871
- Place of birth: Baillieston, Lanarkshire, Scotland
- Date of death: 6 July 1927 (aged 56)
- Place of death: Glasgow, Scotland
- Position: Right half

Senior career*
Years	Team	Apps	(Gls)
–	Baillieston Thistle		
–	Airdrieonians		
1895–1896	Blackburn Rovers	3	(0)
1896–1898	Lincoln City	56	(0)
- * Club domestic league appearances and goals

Gardner Hannah (4 February 1871 – 6 July 1927) was a Scottish footballer who made 59 appearances in the Football League playing for Blackburn Rovers and Lincoln City. He played as a right half. Before moving to England, he played for his local team, Baillieston Thistle, and for Airdrieonians.

He later worked as a colliery pit motorman. He died in the Glasgow Royal Infirmary of crush injuries following a mining accident.
