= Tom Yule =

Scottish footballer

- Yule in a Port Vale team photo.

Personal information
- Full name: Thomas Yule
- Date of birth: 4 February 1888
- Place of birth: Douglas Water, South Lanarkshire, Scotland
- Position: Left winger

Youth career
- Portobello

Senior career*
Years	Team	Apps	(Gls)
1909–1911	Lincoln City	63	(8)
1911–1913	Wolverhampton Wanderers	33	(7)
1913–1915	Port Vale	53	(13)
Total		149	(28)
- * Club domestic league appearances and goals

Thomas Yule (4 February 1888 – ?) was a Scottish footballer who played on the left-wing for Lincoln City, Wolverhampton Wanderers, and Port Vale in the 1910s.

== Career ==
Yule played for Portobello before moving down to England to play for Lincoln City of the Second Division. He moved on to Wolverhampton Wanderers in 1911. Wolves finished fifth in the Second Division in 1911–12 and then tenth in 1912–13. In his two seasons at Molineux, Yule made 33 appearances, scoring seven goals. He joined Port Vale in the summer of 1913. The "left-wing flyer" made his debut in a 3–3 draw with Blackburn Rovers Reserves in a Central League match at the Old Recreation Ground on 1 September 1913. He was a regular in the team and helped them reach the FA Cup first round in the 1913–14 season, which they lost 3–0 to Bolton Wanderers on 10 January 1914. Yule racked up 20 goals in 77 appearances before departing the club in January 1915.

== Career statistics ==
Appearances and goals by club, season and competition
Club	Season	League			FA Cup		Total	
Club	Season	Division	Apps	Goals	Apps	Goals	Apps	Goals
Lincoln City	1909–10	Second Division	37	6	1	0	38	6
Lincoln City	1910–11	Second Division	26	2	3	0	29	2
Lincoln City	Total		63	8	4	0	67	8
Wolverhampton Wanderers	1911–12	Second Division	25	6	0	0	25	6
Wolverhampton Wanderers	1912–13	Second Division	8	1	0	0	8	1
Wolverhampton Wanderers	Total		33	7	0	0	33	7
Port Vale	1913–14	Central League	35	8	9	3	44	11
Port Vale	1914–15	Central League	18	5	3	0	21	5
Port Vale	Total		53	13	12	3	65	16
Total			149	28	16	3	165	31
