= Herbert Wiltshire =

English footballer

Personal information
- Full name: Herbert Henry Wiltshire
- Date of birth: 1871
- Place of birth: Worcester, England
- Position: Left half

Senior career*
Years	Team	Apps	(Gls)
18??–1893	Warmley		
1893–1894	Lincoln City	27	(0)
1894–????	Warmley		
- * Club domestic league appearances and goals

Herbert Henry Wiltshire (1871 – after 1893) was an English footballer who made 27 appearances in the Football League playing for Lincoln City as a left half.

Wiltshire was born in Worcester, and played football for Bristol-based club Warmley. He helped the club win the Gloucestershire Senior Cup in 1892, beating Bedminster by two goals to one, and later that year he was selected to represent Gloucestershire in an inter-county match against Somerset. He contributed to Warmley becoming inaugural champions of the Bristol & District League, in 1892–93; the Bristol Mercury's preview of the season to come described him as "a most valuable half-back in last year's team".

Ahead of the 1893–94 Football League season, he turned professional with Lincoln City. He played in all but one of Lincoln's matches in the Second Division as the team finished in mid-table. Nevertheless, at the end of the season he returned to Bristol, his amateur status was reinstated and he resumed his career with Warmley.
