= Charles Blakey =

English footballer

Personal information
- Full name: Charles Henry Smithson Blakey
- Date of birth: 4 January 1896
- Place of birth: Lincoln, Lincolnshire England
- Date of death: 31 August 1962 (aged 65–66)
- Place of death: Scunthorpe, Lincolnshire, England
- Positions: Goalkeeper; defender

Senior career*
Years	Team	Apps	(Gls)
–	Lincoln YMCA		
–	Newland Athletic		
1916–1920	Lincoln City	30	(0)
1920–1921	Doncaster Rovers		(0)
19??–1933	Boston Town		
1933–1934	Boston United	19	(2)
- * Club domestic league appearances and goals

Charles Henry Smithson Blakey (4 January 1896 – 31 August 1962) was an English footballer who made 30 appearances in the Football League playing for Lincoln City as a goalkeeper. He went on to play for Midland League clubs Doncaster Rovers, Boston Town, and the newly formed Boston United, for whom he played as a defender.
