= Ned Mettam =

English footballer

Personal information
- Full name: Edward Mettam
- Date of birth: 18 August 1868
- Place of birth: Lincoln, England
- Date of death: 31 May 1943 (aged 74)
- Place of death: Lincoln, England
- Position: Right half

Senior career*
Years	Team	Apps	(Gls)
1889–1896	Lincoln City	85	(0)
- * Club domestic league appearances and goals

Edward Mettam (18 August 1868 – 31 May 1943) was an English footballer who made 85 appearances in the Football League for Lincoln City while making 99 appearances in all competitions. He played as a right half.

He later worked as a pub owner in his hometown of Lincoln, where he died in 1943.
