= Alec Ormiston =

Scottish footballer (1884–1952)

Personal information
- Full name: Andrew Paisley Ormiston
- Date of birth: 1 March 1884
- Place of birth: Peebles, Scotland
- Date of death: 30 June 1952 (aged 68)
- Place of death: Peebles, Peeblesshire, Scotland
- Positions: Centre half; left half

Senior career*
Years	Team	Apps	(Gls)
- Hebburn Argyle
1907–1909	Lincoln City (Note: Ormiston's Lincoln City infobox statistics are for the Football League only, and exclude appearances and goals in the 1908–09 Midland League season.)	24	(2)
1909–1919	Chelsea	95	(1)
1919–1920	Lincoln City	20	(0)
- Peebles Rovers
- * Club domestic league appearances and goals

Andrew Paisley Ormiston (1 March 1884 – 1952), also known as Alec Ormiston, was a Scottish footballer who made 139 appearances in the Football League playing for Lincoln City and Chelsea. He played as a centre half or left half.

== Life and career ==
Ormiston was born in Peebles, Scotland. He played non-League football in England for Hebburn Argyle, before joining Football League Second Division club Lincoln City in 1907. The club finished bottom of the division in 1908, and failed to gain re-election to the League. Ormiston helped Lincoln win their second Midland League title in 1908–09, and then followed former Lincoln manager David Calderhead to First Division club Chelsea. He played just over 100 matches in senior competition over five years, and made a solid contribution to Chelsea's return to the First Division in 1912, but his career with the club effectively ended in April 1914 when he suffered a serious ankle injury in a match at Bradford City.

He guested for former club Lincoln during the war, and signed for them when competitive football resumed in 1919. On the opening day of the 1919–20 season, as Lincoln earned an unexpected draw against West Ham United, who were playing their first match after joining the Football League from the Southern League, Ormiston's experience made him stand out:

In strong contrast was Ormiston – the old Chelsea player – on the other side. He stabilised the Lincoln defence, and seemed like a father to it, and he also gave his attack the benefit of some nice nursing and support. In fact, in this match—historic as a landmark, but otherwise easily forgettable—there were only three men who did anything to distinguish themselves from the commonplace, and these were all on the side of Lincoln. One was Ormiston, for his experienced conception of pivotal work.

He played his last game for Lincoln in December 1919, and returned to Scotland, where he appeared for Peebles Rovers.

Ormiston died 30 June 1952 in Peebles, Peeblesshire, Scotland.
