= Frederick Grocott =

Scottish footballer

Personal information
- Full name: Frederick Grocott
- Date of birth: 1900
- Place of birth: Paisley, Renfrewshire, Scotland
- Height: 5 ft 6 1/2 in (1.69 m)
- Position: Right back

Senior career*
| Years | Team | Apps | (Gls) |
| – | Walker Celtic | | |
| 1922–1925 | Lincoln City | 60 | (0) |
- * Club domestic league appearances and goals

Frederick Grocott (1900 – after 1924) was a Scottish footballer who made 60 appearances in the Football League playing for Lincoln City. He played at right back.
