= Slotch Shaw =

English footballer

Personal information
- Full name: George Shaw
- Date of birth: 1865
- Place of birth: Lincoln, England
- Date of death: 15 December 1928 (aged 62–63)
- Positions: Right half; outside left

Senior career*
Years	Team	Apps	(Gls)
- Lincoln Ramblers
1887–1896	Lincoln City	13	(0)
- * Club domestic league appearances and goals

George Shaw (1865 – 15 December 1928), known as Slotch Shaw, was an English professional footballer who made thirteen appearances in the Football League playing as a right half or outside left for Lincoln City.

Shaw was born in Lincoln in 1865. He made his debut for Lincoln City on 15 October 1887 in the FA Cup, and played his last game for their first team in the Football League Second Division against Notts County on 19 October 1895. He scored 24 goals in 86 senior appearances for the club. Shaw died on 15 December 1928, aged about 63.
