= Stuart Hibberd (footballer) =

English footballer

Personal information
- Full name: Stuart Hibberd
- Date of birth: 11 October 1961 (age 65)
- Place of birth: Sheffield, England
- Position: Midfielder

Youth career
- –: Lincoln City

Senior career*
Years	Team	Apps	(Gls)
1981–1983	Lincoln City	42	(3)
1983–1984	Boston United	11	(0)
1984–19??	Alfreton Town		
- * Club domestic league appearances and goals

Stuart Hibberd (born 11 October 1961) is an English former footballer who made 43 appearances in the Football League for Lincoln City. A midfielder, he also played in the Alliance Premier League for Boston United and in the Northern Counties East League for Alfreton Town.
