= George E. Miller =

American physician and medical educator

- Born: June 19, 1919
- Died: November 7, 1998 (aged 79)
- Known for: Research in medical education

Academic background
- Education: University of Pennsylvania

Academic work
- Discipline: Medicine
- Sub-discipline: Medical education
- Institutions: University at Buffalo, University of Illinois Chicago
- Notable ideas: Miller's pyramid of assessment

George E. Miller (1919 – November 7, 1998) was an American physician and a key figure in the development of the field of medical education.

From 1955 to 1959, Miller served as Coordinator of the Project in Medical Education at the University at Buffalo, creating a pilot multidisciplinary research team that served as a proof of concept for the study of medical education. Miller subsequently established the Office of Research in Medical Education (ORME) at the University of Illinois College of Medicine in 1959, creating a model for medical education departments and centers within medical schools internationally.

Through his consulting relationship with the World Health Organization, Miller was instrumental in promoting faculty training and degree programs in the area of medical education in the United States and worldwide.

Under Miller's direction, the renamed Center for Educational Development (CED; now the Department of Medical Education) established new standards for the medical school—including a comprehensive assessment system in place of individual departmental judgment—that became an influential model in the field of medical education and resulted in a restructuring of US National Board of Medical Examiners (NBME) licensing examinations.

Miller's research led to the development of the Association of American Medical Colleges (AAMC) Research in Medical Education (RIME) Conference in 1962, the formation of the Society of Directors of Research in Medical Education (SDRME) in 1965, and the AAMC Group on Educational Affairs (GEA) in 1971. In addition, he chaired the Clinical Skills Steering Committee until 1996. In 1985, Miller was the second recipient of NBME's Hubbard Award for excellence in assessment in medical education.

One of Miller's seminal reviews, "The assessment of clinical skills/competence/performance," introduced a framework now referred to as "Miller's pyramid." This framework describes four levels of clinical assessment, comprising "knows" (assessment of knowledge), "knows how" (assessment of competence), "shows how" (assessment of performance), and "does" (assessment of action).
