= Con Moulson =

Irish footballer and manager

Personal information
- Full name: Cornelius Moulson
- Date of birth: 3 September 1906
- Place of birth: Clogheen, Ireland
- Date of death: 27 October 1989 (aged 83)
- Place of death: Lincoln, England
- Height: 6 ft 0 in (1.83 m)
- Position: Center-back

Senior career*
Years	Team	Apps	(Gls)
1932–1936	Lincoln City	93	(2)
1936–1939	Notts County	31	(0)
1939–1943	Lincoln City	97	(0)

International career
1936–1937	Ireland	5	(0)

Managerial career
- 1965: Lincoln City
- * Club domestic league appearances and goals

Cornelius "Con" Moulson (3 September 1906 – 27 October 1989) was an Irish footballer and manager. His early playing career was spent in his native Ireland, before a spell in the English leagues, most notably for Lincoln City between 1932 and 1936, and then again from 1939 to 1943, with a spell at Notts County in between his two spells at Lincoln. He also won five call-ups for his country.

His playing career ended in 1943 and he subsequently took up a job at a factory in Lincoln, where he continued working after the war ended, along with taking up a part-time role as Lincoln City's kit man. When long-serving manager Bill Anderson retired in 1965, Moulson was the shock choice to be the club's new manager, despite not having had any day-to-day involvement in football for almost three decades. After only eight matches, which saw an unconventional 3–3–4 formation being deployed and 21 goals conceded, Moulson was relieved of his duties. Every single one of the eight matches which Moulson was in charge for ended in defeat, giving him arguably the worst record of any permanent manager in the entire history of the league.

After his turn as manager, Moulson reverted to his role as kit man and resumed work at the factory where he had been previously working.

His brother, George Moulson was also a footballer. The two were honoured by their hometown of Clogheen in 2013.
