= Albert Platts =

English footballer

Personal information
- Full name: Albert John Platts
- Date of birth: 27 December 1883
- Place of birth: Worksop, Nottinghamshire, England
- Date of death: 1969 (aged 85–86)
- Height: 5 ft 9 in (1.75 m)
- Positions: Inside left; outside left

Senior career*
Years	Team	Apps	(Gls)
–	Ashton Juniors		
–	Worksop Town		
1910–1913	Lincoln City	29	(4)
–	Scunthorpe & Lindsey United		
–	Rotherham Town		
- * Club domestic league appearances and goals

Albert John Platts (27 December 1883 – 1969) was an English footballer who made 29 appearances in the Football League playing for Lincoln City. He played at inside left or outside left. He also played non-league football for clubs including Worksop Town, Scunthorpe & Lindsey United and Rotherham Town.
