= George H. Miller (physicist) =

American physicist

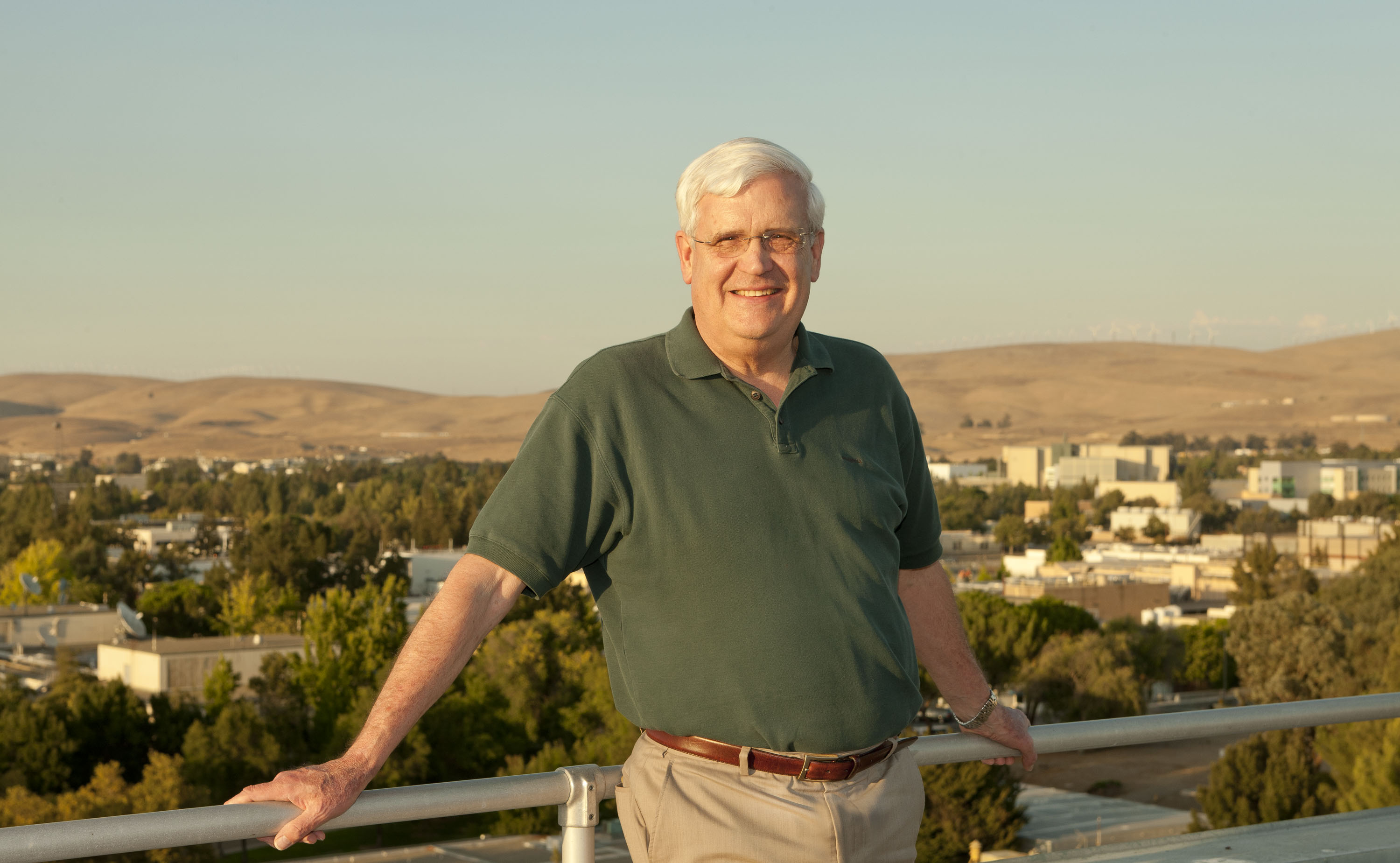
George Miller

George H. Miller Ph.D. served as director of the Lawrence Livermore National Laboratory (LLNL) from 2007 until 2011. Dr. Miller, an employee of the Laboratory for 34 years, replaced Michael Anastasio, who left LLNL to head Los Alamos National Laboratory.

Dr. Miller received his B.S. with high honors in physics in 1967, his M.S. in physics in 1969 and his Ph.D. in physics in 1972, all from the College of William & Mary.

Dr. Miller joined the LLNL staff in 1972, as a physicist. In 1985, he became associate director for nuclear design. He left LLNL in 1989, to serve as the special scientific adviser on weapons activities to the U.S. Department of Energy. In 1990 he returned to LLNL to serve as associate director for defense and nuclear technologies, associate director for national security, and associate director for National Ignition Facility programs. Prior to being named the LLNL Director, he had been associate director at large for LLNL since June 2005. He retired as LLNL director in December 2011.
