= Ken Hastie =

South African soccer player

Personal information
- Full name: John Kenneth George Hastie
- Date of birth: 6 September 1928
- Place of birth: Cape Town, South Africa
- Date of death: 2 October 2002 (aged 74)
- Place of death: Constantia, South Africa
- Height: 1.77 m (5 ft 10 in)
- Position: Centre forward

Senior career*
Years	Team	Apps	(Gls)
- Clyde Athletic
1952–1953	Leeds United	4	(2)
1953–1955	Germiston Callies		

International career
- South Africa
- * Club domestic league appearances and goals

John Kenneth George Hastie (6 September 1928 – 2 October 2002) was a South African footballer who played as a centre forward.

== Career ==
In August 1952, Hastie signed for Leeds United from South African club Clyde Athletic after impressing for South Africa the previous year, during a Newcastle United tour of the country. On 17 September 1952, Hastie made his debut for Leeds against Birmingham City in a Second Division game, scoring twice in a 2–2 draw. Hastie only made three more league appearances for the club, due, in part, to the emergence of John Charles. At the end of the 1952–53 season, Hastie was released by Leeds, returning to South Africa to play for Germiston Callies.
