= Herbert Simpson =

English footballer

Personal information
- Full name: Herbert Simpson
- Date of birth: 29 September 1863
- Place of birth: Sleaford, Lincolnshire, England
- Date of death: 29 December 1929 (aged 66)
- Position: Left back

Senior career*
Years	Team	Apps	(Gls)
- Lincoln Rovers
1884–1893	Lincoln City	3	(0)
- * Club domestic league appearances and goals

Herbert Simpson (29 September 1863 – 29 December 1929) was an English footballer who made three appearances in the Football League playing for Lincoln City as a left back. Simpson played in Lincoln City's first FA Cup match, in 1884, was part of the team that won the inaugural Midland League title in 1889–90, and represented the club in their first season in the Football League, in 1892–93.
