= Albert Sissons =

English footballer

Personal information
- Date of birth: 5 July 1903
- Place of birth: Kiveton Park, England
- Height: 5 ft 11 in (1.80 m)
- Position: Forward

Senior career*
Years	Team	Apps	(Gls)
1921-1923	Kiveton Park		
1923	Arsenal		
1923–1925	Doncaster Rovers	80	(2)
1925–1928	Leeds United	30	(1)
1928–1929	Southport	30	(3)
1929–1930	Northampton Town	19	(4)
- * Club domestic league appearances and goals

Albert Sissons (5 July 1903 – after 1927) was an English footballer who played for Doncaster Rovers and Leeds United.
