= Henry McCann =

Scottish footballer

Personal information
- Full name: Henry McCann
- Date of birth: 1887
- Place of birth: Stenhousemuir, Stirlingshire, Scotland
- Position: Inside left

Youth career
- Glasgow Ashfield

Senior career*
Years	Team	Apps	(Gls)
1905–1907	Hibernian	17	(2)
1907–1909	Lincoln City (Note: Lincoln City infobox statistics omit matches in the 1908–09 Midland League season: the free-access sections of the Lincoln City FC Archive do not distinguish between appearances in competitions other than the Football League.)	17	(6)
- * Club domestic league appearances and goals

Henry McCann (1887 – after 1909) was a Scottish footballer who played in the Scottish Football League for Hibernian and in the English Football League and the Midland League for Lincoln City. He played as an inside left.
