= Eddie Dwane =

English footballer

Personal information
- Full name: Edwin John Dwane
- Date of birth: 17 July 1896
- Place of birth: Valletta, Malta
- Date of death: 10 February 1973 (aged 76)
- Height: 5 ft 9 in (1.75 m)
- Positions: Inside left; left half

Senior career*
Years	Team	Apps	(Gls)
–	Royal Engineers (Chatham)		
1920–1924	Lincoln City	50	(6)
1924–192?	Boston Town		
192?–1926	Newark Town		
1926–192?	Lincoln City	0	(0)
–	Worksop Town		
- * Club domestic league appearances and goals

Edwin John Dwane (17 July 1896 – 10 February 1973) was an English footballer who made 46 appearances in the Football League for Lincoln City as an inside left or left half. He also played in the Midland League for Lincoln City, and in non-league football for Boston Town, Newark Town and Worksop Town.
