= Bernard Towler =

English footballer

Personal information
- Full name: Bernard Edward Towler
- Date of birth: 13 March 1912
- Place of birth: Ipswich, Suffolk, England
- Date of death: 19 May 1992 (aged 80)
- Positions: Outside left; inside left

Senior career*
Years	Team	Apps	(Gls)
–	Lincoln Corinthians		
1933–1938	Lincoln City	68	(32)
1938–1939	Notts County	22	(9)
–	Ruston Bucyrus		
1946–1947	Boston United	13	(4)
- * Club domestic league appearances and goals

Bernard Edward Towler (13 March 1912 – 19 May 1992) was an English footballer who scored 41 goals from 90 appearances in the Football League playing for Lincoln City and Notts County. He played at outside left or inside left. His career was interrupted by the Second World War; after the war he played for Boston United for a season in the Midland League.
