= Don Footitt =

English footballer

Personal information
- Full name: Donald Footitt
- Date of birth: 24 May 1929
- Place of birth: Grantham, Lincolnshire, England
- Date of death: 10 June 1995 (aged 66)
- Position: Goalkeeper

Senior career*
Years	Team	Apps	(Gls)
- St John's
1946–1947	Lincoln City	24	(0)
1949–1950	Crewe Alexandra	1	(0)
- Ransome & Marles
- * Club domestic league appearances and goals

Donald Footitt (24 May 1929 – 10 June 1995) was an English footballer who made 25 appearances in the Football League playing for Lincoln City and Crewe Alexandra as a goalkeeper.

Footitt made his Lincoln debut at the age of 17 years, 7 months, in December 1946, as Lincoln beat Wrexham in an FA Cup replay; the Daily Mirror described him as the hero of the tie. An amateur who worked in an office in Grantham, Footitt missed only one senior match between then and the end of the season. He played only once more in senior competition, for Crewe Alexandra in the 1949–50 Football League season.
