= Thomas Eyre (footballer) =

English footballer

Personal information
- Full name: Thomas Eyre (Note: The Lincoln City FC Archive and Michael Joyce's Football League Players' Records give the player's surname as Eyre. However, contemporary newspapers, including the Liverpool Mercury (1895 and 1897), the Nottinghamshire Guardian (1896), the Sheffield & Rotherham Independent (1896), and the Manchester Guardian (1897), frequently, but not exclusively, refer to him as Eyres.)
- Position: Left back

Senior career*
Years	Team	Apps	(Gls)
–	Ashfield		
1895–1898	Lincoln City	65	(1)
–	Hamilton Academical		
- * Club domestic league appearances and goals

Thomas Eyre (fl. 1890s) was a footballer who made 65 appearances in the Football League playing for Lincoln City. He played at left back. Either side of Lincoln, he played for Ashfield and Hamilton Academical in Scotland.
