= George Miller (footballer, born 1886) =

Scottish footballer

Personal information
- Full name: George Miller
- Date of birth: 1886
- Place of birth: Riggend, Lanarkshire, Scotland
- Position: Left half

Senior career*
Years	Team	Apps	(Gls)
–	Larkhall United		
1910–1911	Lincoln City	22	(0)
- * Club domestic league appearances and goals

George Miller (1886 – after 1910) was a Scottish footballer who made 22 appearances in the Football League playing for Lincoln City as a left half.
