= Peter Mackin =

English footballer

Peter Mackin (Machin)
Personal information
- Full name: Peter Mackin
- Date of birth: 1878
- Place of birth: Gateshead, England
- Date of death: 9 April 1917 (aged 38)
- Place of death: Vimy Ridge, France
- Position: Inside right

Senior career*
Years	Team	Apps	(Gls)
–1899	Hebburn Argyle		
1899–1903	Sunderland	0	(0)
1903–1905	Wallsend Park Villa		
1905–1907	Lincoln City	54	(21)
1907–1908	Wallsend Park Villa		
1908–1910	Blyth Spartans		
1910–1911	Bedlington United		
- Ashington
- Willington Athletic
- Newburn
- * Club domestic league appearances and goals

Peter Mackin (sometimes Machin) (1878 – 9 April 1917) was an English professional footballer who played in the Football League for Lincoln City as an inside right.

== Career ==
An inside right, Mackin had a long career in non-League football in his native North East, most notably with North Eastern League club Blyth Spartans. He scored 21 goals in 54 Football League appearances for Lincoln City.

== Personal life ==
Mackin was married with five children and worked as a shipyard labourer in Hebburn, Wallsend and Blyth. He served as a private in the Royal Northumberland Fusiliers during the First World War and was wounded on the first day on the Somme. Mackin was killed during the Battle of Vimy Ridge on 9 April 1917. He was buried in Roclincourt Military Cemetery.

== Honours ==
Blyth Spartans

- Northern Football Alliance: 1908–09
- Tynemouth Infirmary Cup: 1908–09, 1909–10

Bedlington United

- Tynemouth Infirmary Cup: 1910–11
