= George Fern =

English footballer

Personal information
- Full name: George Edward Fern
- Date of birth: 10 February 1874
- Place of birth: Burton upon Trent, Staffordshire, England
- Date of death: 19 May 1955 (aged 81)
- Place of death: Coventry, Warwickshire, England
- Position: Outside left

Senior career*
Years	Team	Apps	(Gls)
–	Hinckley Town		
1898–1899	Lincoln City	24	(3)
1899–1900	Millwall Athletic	7	(0)
1900	Watford	4	(1)
1900–1901	Fulham	10	(5)
–	Coventry City		
- * Club domestic league appearances and goals

George Edward Fern (10 February 1874 – 19 May 1955), sometimes spelt Ferne, was an English footballer who made 24 appearances in the Football League playing for Lincoln City. He played as an outside left. He also played in the Southern League for Millwall Athletic, Watford and Fulham, and in non-league football for Hinckley Town and Coventry City.
