= William Pallister =

English footballer

Personal information
- Full name: William Pallister
- Date of birth: 1884
- Place of birth: Gateshead, County Durham, England
- Position: Left back

Senior career*
Years	Team	Apps	(Gls)
1899–1902	Sunderland	1	(0)
1902–1905	Lincoln City	59	(0)
- * Club domestic league appearances and goals

William Pallister (1884 – after 1904) was an English footballer who made 60 appearances in the Football League playing for Sunderland and Lincoln City. He played at left back.
