= Colin Symm =

English footballer

Personal information
- Full name: Colin Symm
- Date of birth: 26 November 1946 (age 79)
- Place of birth: Dunston-on-Tyne, County Durham, England
- Position: Midfielder

Youth career
- –: Redheugh Boys Club

Senior career*
Years	Team	Apps	(Gls)
–	Gateshead		
1966–1968	Sheffield Wednesday	19	(1)
1969–1972	Sunderland	14	(0)
1972–1975	Lincoln City	69	(7)
1975–1978	Boston United	92	(9)
- * Club domestic league appearances and goals

Colin Symm (born 26 November 1946) is an English former footballer who scored 8 goals from 102 appearances in the Football League playing as a midfielder for Sheffield Wednesday, Sunderland and Lincoln City. He also played non-league football for Gateshead, and Boston United,
