= Albert Groves (footballer, born 1883) =

English footballer

Personal information
- Full name: James Albert Groves
- Date of birth: July 1883
- Place of birth: South Bank, Middlesbrough, England
- Position: Full back

Senior career*
Years	Team	Apps	(Gls)
–	South Bank		
1903–1904	Lincoln City	29	(2)
1904–1907	Sheffield United	62	(0)
1907–1910	Middlesbrough	27	(2)
–	Wingate Albion		
- * Club domestic league appearances and goals

James Albert Groves (July 1883 – after 1909), known as Albert Groves, was an English footballer who made 118 appearances in the Football League playing for Lincoln City, Sheffield United and Middlesbrough. He played as a full back. He began his career with his local club, South Bank of the Northern League, and later played for North Eastern League club Wingate Albion. In February 1905, he played for The North in a trial for England's international match against Ireland later that month, but was not selected.
