= George Moulson =

Irish footballer

Personal information
- Full name: George Bernard Moulson
- Date of birth: 6 August 1914
- Place of birth: Clogheen, County Tipperary, Ireland
- Date of death: 11 November 1994 (aged 80)
- Place of death: Grimsby, England
- Height: 5 ft 11 in (1.80 m)
- Position: Goalkeeper

Senior career*
Years	Team	Apps	(Gls)
1936–1947	Grimsby Town	1	(0)
1947–1948	Lincoln City	60	(0)

International career
1947–1948	Republic of Ireland	3	(0)
- * Club domestic league appearances and goals

George Bernard Moulson (6 August 1914 – 11 November 1994) was an Irish professional footballer.

He played three times for the Republic of Ireland national football team and also played at club level for Lincoln City, Grimsby Town and Peterborough United.

A goalkeeper, Moulson made his international debut in a 2–0 defeat to Portugal on 23 May 1948 in the Estádio da Luz, Lisbon.

Moulson played in the semi-final of the FA Cup on 25 March 1939, Wolverhampton Wanderers played Grimsby, in a FA Cup semi-final at Old Trafford. The attendance of 76,962 remains Old Trafford's largest ever attendance. The Mariners lost the game 5–0 after Moulson was injured early in the match. With the rules forbidding substitutes for injuries, Grimsby had to play with 10 men and an outfield player in goal.
