= 1963–64 Rochdale A.F.C. season =

English football club season

Rochdale
1963–64 season
- Manager: Tony Collins
- League Division Four: 20th
- FA Cup: 2nd Round
- League Cup: 2nd Round
- Top goalscorer: League: Joe Richardson; All: Joe Richardson; George Morton

The 1963–64 season was Rochdale A.F.C.'s 57th in existence and their 5th consecutive in the Football League Fourth Division.

== Statistics ==
| No. | Pos | Nat | Player | Total | | Division 4 | | F.A. Cup | | League Cup | | Lancashire Cup | | Rose Bowl | |
| No. | Pos | Nat | Player | Apps | Goals | Apps | Goals | Apps | Goals | Apps | Goals | Apps | Goals | Apps | Goals |
|---|---|---|---|---|---|---|---|---|---|---|---|---|---|---|---|
| | GK | (England) ENG | Ted Burgin | 46 | 0 | 40 | 0 | 2 | 0 | 3 | 0 | 0 | 0 | 1 | 0 |
| | DF | (England) ENG | Stanley Milburn | 50 | 1 | 44 | 1 | 2 | 0 | 3 | 0 | 0 | 0 | 1 | 0 |
| | DF | (Scotland) SCO | Doug Winton | 44 | 0 | 38 | 0 | 2 | 0 | 3 | 0 | 0 | 0 | 1 | 0 |
| | FW | (England) ENG | Stan Hepton | 43 | 0 | 36 | 0 | 2 | 0 | 3 | 0 | 1 | 0 | 1 | 0 |
| | DF | (England) ENG | Ray Aspden | 44 | 0 | 39 | 0 | 1 | 0 | 3 | 0 | 0 | 0 | 1 | 0 |
| | MF | (England) ENG | Jimmy Thompson | 52 | 5 | 45 | 4 | 2 | 0 | 3 | 1 | 1 | 0 | 1 | 0 |
| | MF | (England) ENG | Doug Wragg | 26 | 2 | 22 | 2 | 0 | 0 | 2 | 0 | 1 | 0 | 1 | 0 |
| | FW | (England) ENG | George Morton | 46 | 16 | 40 | 9 | 2 | 0 | 3 | 5 | 0 | 0 | 1 | 2 |
| | FW | (England) ENG | Ronnie Cairns | 28 | 8 | 23 | 7 | 2 | 0 | 1 | 0 | 1 | 0 | 1 | 1 |
| | FW | (England) ENG | Joe Richardson | 39 | 16 | 33 | 11 | 2 | 2 | 3 | 1 | 0 | 0 | 1 | 2 |
| | MF | (England) ENG | David Storf | 51 | 5 | 45 | 4 | 2 | 0 | 3 | 1 | 0 | 0 | 1 | 0 |
| | MF | (England) ENG | Peter Phoenix | 5 | 0 | 4 | 0 | 0 | 0 | 1 | 0 | 0 | 0 | 0 | 0 |
| | FW | (England) ENG | Dave Kerry | 15 | 5 | 12 | 4 | 0 | 0 | 2 | 1 | 1 | 0 | 0 | 0 |
| | FW | (England) ENG | Don Watson | 28 | 8 | 25 | 7 | 2 | 1 | 0 | 0 | 1 | 0 | 0 | 0 |
| | DF | (England) ENG | David Wells | 10 | 0 | 8 | 0 | 1 | 0 | 0 | 0 | 1 | 0 | 0 | 0 |
| | GK | (England) ENG | Simon Jones | 7 | 0 | 6 | 0 | 0 | 0 | 0 | 0 | 1 | 0 | 0 | 0 |
| | DF | (Scotland) SCO | Jack Martin | 9 | 1 | 8 | 1 | 0 | 0 | 0 | 0 | 1 | 0 | 0 | 0 |
| | MF | (England) ENG | Brian Taylor | 16 | 0 | 15 | 0 | 0 | 0 | 0 | 0 | 1 | 0 | 0 | 0 |
| | MF | (England) ENG | Don MacKenzie | 19 | 5 | 18 | 5 | 0 | 0 | 0 | 0 | 1 | 0 | 0 | 0 |
| | MF | (England) ENG | John Hardman | 5 | 0 | 5 | 0 | 0 | 0 | 0 | 0 | 0 | 0 | 0 | 0 |

== Final League Table ==
| Pos | Team | Pld | W | D | L | GF | GA | GAv | Pts | Promotion or relegation |
|---|---|---|---|---|---|---|---|---|---|---|
| 18 | Oxford United | 46 | 14 | 13 | 19 | 59 | 63 | 0.937 | 41 | |
| 19 | Darlington | 46 | 14 | 12 | 20 | 66 | 93 | 0.710 | 40 | |
| 20 | Rochdale | 46 | 12 | 15 | 19 | 56 | 59 | 0.949 | 39 | |
| 21 | Southport | 46 | 15 | 9 | 22 | 63 | 88 | 0.716 | 39 | Re-elected |
| 22 | York City | 46 | 14 | 7 | 25 | 52 | 66 | 0.788 | 35 | Re-elected |

Source: rsssf.com

== Competitions ==
=== Football League Fourth Division ===
| 24 August 1963 1 | York City | 0–3 | Rochdale | York |
| | | Report | Cairns 1'; Richardson 44'; Morton 63' | Stadium: Bootham Crescent; Attendance: 5446; Referee: K Stokes |

| 28 August 1963 2 | Rochdale | 1–1 | Brighton & Hove Albion | Rochdale |
| | Thompson 66' | Report | Cooper 65' | Stadium: Spotland Stadium; Attendance: 5662 |

| 31 August 1963 3 | Rochdale | 1–3 | Barrow | Rochdale |
| | Richardson 39' | Report | Ackerley 9'; Thompson 19' (pen.); Howard 57' | Stadium: Spotland Stadium; Attendance: 4216; Referee: DJ Lyden |

| 7 September 1963 4 | Torquay United | 1–0 | Rochdale | Torquay |
| | Hancock 7' | Report | | Stadium: Plainmoor; Attendance: 4787; Referee: P Rhodes |

| 10 September 1963 5 | Brighton & Hove Albion | 3–1 | Rochdale | Brighton and Hove |
| | Goodchild; Collins | Report | Kerry | Stadium: Goldstone Ground; Attendance: 7181 |

| 14 September 1963 6 | Oxford United | 1–1 | Rochdale | Oxford |
| | Jones 50' | Report | Kerry | Stadium: Manor Ground; Attendance: 6761; Referee: R Aldous |

| 21 September 1963 7 | Rochdale | 5–0 | Workington | Rochdale |
| | Richardson 14', 82'; Storf 15'; Morton 40'; Kerry 66' | Report | | Stadium: Spotland Stadium; Attendance: 3366; Referee: E Crawford |

| 28 September 1963 8 | Newport County | 1–1 | Rochdale | Newport |
| | Smith 66' | Report | Thompson 60' | Stadium: Rodney Parade; Attendance: 4878; Referee: JR Loynton |

| 2 October 1963 9 | Chester | 2–0 | Rochdale | Chester |
| | Lee 7'; Humes 85' | Report | | Stadium: Sealand Road; Attendance: 5220 |

| 5 October 1963 10 | Rochdale | 1–0 | Stockport County | Rochdale |
| | Richardson 80' | Report | | Stadium: Spotland Stadium; Attendance: 3995; Referee: RH Windle |

| 12 October 1963 11 | Rochdale | 1–1 | Tranmere Rovers | Rochdale |
| | Kerry 62' | Report | Evans 11' | Stadium: Spotland Stadium; Attendance: 3731; Referee: V James |

| 16 October 1963 12 | Rochdale | 0–1 | Chesterfield | Rochdale |
| | | Report | Frear | Stadium: Spotland Stadium; Attendance: 2698 |

| 19 October 1963 13 | Darlington | 3–2 | Rochdale | Darlington |
| | Lawton 25'; Robson 60', 84' | Report | Storf 29'; Morton 76' | Stadium: Feethams; Attendance: 3439; Referee: HP Hackney |

| 23 October 1963 14 | Bradford Park Avenue | 2–2 | Rochdale | Bradford |
| | Fryatt; Burns | Report | Morton; Richardson | Stadium: Park Avenue; Attendance: 5484 |

| 26 October 1963 15 | Rochdale | 2–0 | Hartlepools United | Rochdale |
| | Morton 12'; Storf 72' | Report | | Stadium: Spotland Stadium; Attendance: 2764; Referee: SB Stoakes |

| 30 October 1963 16 | Rochdale | 0–0 | Bradford Park Avenue | Rochdale |
| | | Report | | Stadium: Spotland Stadium; Attendance: 2490 |

| 2 November 1963 17 | Exeter City | 0–1 | Rochdale | Exeter |
| | | Report | Richardson 14' | Stadium: St James Park; Attendance: 6249; Referee: H Horner |

| 9 November 1963 18 | Rochdale | 4–0 | Southport | Rochdale |
| | Watson 35'; Cairns 46', 77'; Richardson 67' | Report | | Stadium: Spotland Stadium; Attendance: 2690; Referee: JE Thacker |

| 23 November 1963 19 | Rochdale | 2–2 | Lincoln City | Rochdale |
| | Richardson 38'; Cairns 55' | Report | Houghton 28'; Campbell 80' | Stadium: Spotland Stadium; Attendance: 2407; Referee: G McCabe |

| 30 November 1963 20 | Bradford City | 2–0 | Rochdale | Bradford |
| | Ellam 41'; Price 90' | Report | | Stadium: Valley Parade; Attendance: 4595; Referee: JR Loynton |

| 14 December 1963 21 | Rochdale | 2–0 | York City | Rochdale |
| | MacKenzie 39'; Watson 77' | Report | | Stadium: Spotland Stadium; Attendance: 2203 |

| 20 December 1963 22 | Barrow | 1–2 | Rochdale | Barrow-in-Furness |
| | Darwin | Report | Richardson; Arrowsmith (o.g.) | Stadium: Holker Street; Attendance: 1978 |

| 28 December 1963 23 | Rochdale | 4–1 | Halifax Town | Rochdale |
| | MacKenzie 40'; Watson 50', 81'; Morton 53' | Report | Twist 85' | Stadium: Spotland Stadium; Attendance: 3678 |

| 4 January 1964 24 | Gillingham | 0–0 | Rochdale | Gillingham |
| | | Report | | Stadium: Priestfield Stadium; Attendance: 8099 |

| 11 January 1964 25 | Rochdale | 1–2 | Torquay United | Rochdale |
| | Storf 60' | Report | Northcott 9'; Pym 79' | Stadium: Spotland Stadium; Attendance: 3080 |

| 18 January 1964 26 | Rochdale | 0–0 | Oxford United | Rochdale |
| | | Report | | Stadium: Spotland Stadium; Attendance: 2436 |

| 1 February 1964 27 | Workington | 3–0 | Rochdale | Workington |
| | Lowes 20', 57'; Hopper 83' | Report | | Stadium: Borough Park; Attendance: 2832 |

| 8 February 1964 28 | Rochdale | 0–1 | Newport County | Rochdale |
| | | Report | Bonson 7' (pen.) | Stadium: Spotland Stadium; Attendance: 2444 |

| 15 February 1964 29 | Stockport County | 1–0 | Rochdale | Stockport |
| | Davock 46' | Report | | Stadium: Edgeley Park; Attendance: 3487 |

| 21 February 1964 30 | Tranmere Rovers | 2–1 | Rochdale | Birkenhead |
| | Jones; Dyson | Report | MacKenzie | Stadium: Prenton Park; Attendance: 6560 |

| 25 February 1964 31 | Rochdale | 2–2 | Aldershot | Rochdale |
| | Wragg; Watson | Report | Kearns; Palethorpe | Stadium: Spotland Stadium; Attendance: 2329 |

| 29 February 1964 32 | Rochdale | 2–1 | Darlington | Rochdale |
| | MacKenzie 1'; Thompson 44' | Report | McGeachie 4' | Stadium: Spotland Stadium; Attendance: 2355 |

| 4 March 1964 33 | Rochdale | 1–0 | Chester | Rochdale |
| | Wragg | Report | | Stadium: Spotland Stadium; Attendance: 2322 |

| 7 March 1964 34 | Hartlepools United | 1–1 | Rochdale | Hartlepool |
| | Fraser 7' | Report | Milburn 76' | Stadium: Victoria Park; Attendance: 2836 |

| 11 March 1964 35 | Halifax Town | 3–2 | Rochdale | Halifax |
| | Westlake; Taylor | Report | Watson; Morton | Stadium: The Shay; Attendance: 3911 |

| 14 March 1964 36 | Rochdale | 1–3 | Exeter City | Rochdale |
| | Morton 54' | Report | Banks 19'; Thorne 20', 61' | Stadium: Spotland Stadium; Attendance: 2113 |

| 20 March 1964 37 | Southport | 2–1 | Rochdale | Southport |
| | Shepherd; Tighe | Report | Thompson | Stadium: Haig Avenue; Attendance: 2206 |

| 24 March 1964 38 | Doncaster Rovers | 2–0 | Rochdale | Doncaster |
| | Thompson 40' (o.g.); Hale 57' | Report | | Stadium: Belle Vue; Attendance: 5160 |

| 28 March 1964 39 | Rochdale | 1–1 | Carlisle United | Rochdale |
| | Morton 80' | Report | Livingstone 17' | Stadium: Spotland Stadium; Attendance: 2736 |

| 31 March 1964 40 | Rochdale | 2–2 | Doncaster Rovers | Rochdale |
| | Richardson 23'; Martin 60' | Report | Jeffrey 17'; Hale 85' | Stadium: Spotland Stadium; Attendance: 2181 |

| 4 April 1964 41 | Lincoln City | 2–0 | Rochdale | Lincoln |
| | Bracewell 17'; Morton 88' | Report | | Stadium: Sincil Bank; Attendance: 3643 |

| 6 April 1964 42 | Chesterfield | 1–1 | Rochdale | Chesterfield |
| | Rackstraw | Report | Cairns | Stadium: Saltergate Recreation Ground; Attendance: 4277 |

| 11 April 1964 43 | Rochdale | 1–2 | Bradford City | Rochdale |
| | Watson 1' | Report | Green 39'; Price 87' | Stadium: Spotland Stadium; Attendance: 4824 |

| 18 April 1964 44 | Aldershot | 1–1 | Rochdale | Aldershot |
| | Fogg 50' | Report | Cairns 3' | Stadium: Recreation Ground; Attendance: 3742 |

| 21 April 1964 45 | Carlisle United | 1–0 | Rochdale | Carlisle |
| | Evans | Report | | Stadium: Brunton Park; Attendance: 11556 |

| 25 April 1964 46 | Rochdale | 2–1 | Gillingham | Rochdale |
| | MacKenzie 1'; Cairns 54' (pen.) | Report | Godfrey | Stadium: Spotland Stadium; Attendance: 2737 |

=== F.A. Cup ===
| 16 November 1963 1 | Rochdale | 2–1 | Chorley | Rochdale |
| | Watson; Richardson | Report | Wroth | Stadium: Spotland Stadium; Attendance: 5381 |

| 7 December 1963 2 | Barnsley | 3–1 | Rochdale | Barnsley |
| | Kerr 62', 66'; Leighton 89' | Report | Richardson 84' | Stadium: Oakwell; Attendance: 9431; Referee: VJ Batty |

=== League Cup ===
| 4 September 1963 1 | Rochdale | 1–1 | Chester | Rochdale |
| | Morton | Report | Corbishley (pen.) | Stadium: Spotland Stadium; Attendance: 2919 |

| 18 September 1963 1 | Chester | 2–5 | Rochdale | Chester |
| | Humes; Pritchard | Report | Morton; Storf; Thompson; Kerry | Stadium: Sealand Road; Attendance: 5083 |

| 25 September 1963 2 | Halifax Town | 4–2 | Rochdale | Halifax |
| | Fidler; Carlin; Harrison | Report | Morton; Richardson | Stadium: The Shay; Attendance: 4774 |

=== Lancashire Cup ===
| 27 November 1963 | Chester | 1–0 | Rochdale | Chester |
| | Goal | | | Stadium: Sealand Road; Attendance: 2096 |

=== Rose Bowl ===
| 17 August 1963 | Oldham Athletic | 3–5 | Rochdale | Oldham |
| | Goal | | Morton; Richardson; Cairns | Stadium: Boundary Park; Attendance: 8697 |
