= 1960–61 Rochdale A.F.C. season =

English football club season

Rochdale
1960–61 season
- Manager: Tony Collins
- Stadium: Spotland Stadium
- Division 4: 17th
- F.A. Cup: 1st Round
- Top goalscorer: League: Ronnie Cairns; All: Ronnie Cairns

The 1960–61 season was Rochdale A.F.C.'s 54th in existence and their second in the Football League Fourth Division.

== Statistics ==
No.	Pos	Nat	Player	Total		Division 4		F.A. Cup		League Cup		Lancashire Cup	
No.	Pos	Nat	Player	Apps	Goals	Apps	Goals	Apps	Goals	Apps	Goals	Apps	Goals
	GK	(England) ENG	Jimmy Jones	18	0	17	0	0	0	1	0	0	0
	DF	(England) ENG	Stanley Milburn	43	2	37	2	2	0	4	0	0	0
	DF	(Wales) WAL	Dai Powell	21	0	17	0	2	0	2	0	0	0
	MF	(England) ENG	Ron Phoenix	48	0	41	0	2	0	4	0	1	0
	DF	(England) ENG	Ray Aspden	51	0	43	0	2	0	4	0	2	0
	MF	(England) ENG	Alan Bushby	27	0	21	0	2	0	4	0	0	0
	MF	(England) ENG	Ron Barnes	53	3	45	1	2	0	4	2	2	0
	FW	(England) ENG	Stan Hepton	50	15	43	12	2	0	4	2	1	1
	FW	(England) ENG	Frank Lord	36	19	31	17	2	0	3	2	0	0
	FW	(England) ENG	Ronnie Cairns	53	22	45	20	2	1	4	1	2	0
	MF	(England) ENG	Jim Brown	28	3	24	3	0	0	3	0	1	0
	DF	(England) ENG	Norman Bodell	26	0	24	0	0	0	2	0	0	0
	DF	(Wales) WAL	Jack Edwards	32	0	30	0	0	0	0	0	2	0
	GK	(Scotland) SCO	Joffre Mckay	15	0	9	0	2	0	3	0	1	0
	FW	(England) ENG	Jack Pollitt	8	1	6	0	2	1	0	0	0	0
	MF	(England) ENG	Ken McDowall	8	0	6	0	0	0	1	0	1	0
	DF	(England) ENG	Bryn Owen	3	0	1	0	0	0	0	0	2	0
	MF	(England) ENG	John Hardman	7	0	5	0	0	0	0	0	2	0
	FW	(England) ENG	Joe Richardson	7	1	4	0	0	0	1	1	2	0
	MF	(England) ENG	Tony Collins	13	1	13	1	0	0	0	0	0	0
	GK	(England) ENG	Ted Burgin	21	0	20	0	0	0	0	0	1	0
	FW	(Northern Ireland) NIR	Ollie Norris	3	1	2	1	0	0	0	0	1	0
	MF	(England) ENG	Jimmy Thompson	12	1	12	1	0	0	0	0	0	0
	FW	(England) ENG	Brian Birch	10	0	10	0	0	0	0	0	0	0
	MF	(England) ENG	Jim Sanders	1	0	0	0	0	0	0	0	1	0

== Final League Table ==
Pos	Team	Pld	W	D	L	GF	GA	GAv	Pts
15	Gillingham	46	15	13	18	64	66	0.970	43
16	Wrexham	46	17	8	21	62	56	1.107	42
17	Rochdale	46	17	8	21	60	66	0.909	42
18	Accrington Stanley	46	16	8	22	74	88	0.841	40
19	Carlisle United	46	13	13	20	61	79	0.772	39

Source: rsssf.com

== Competitions ==
=== Football League Fourth Division ===
20 August 1960 1	Stockport County	1–0	Rochdale	Stockport
	Fletcher 10'	Report		Stadium: Edgeley Park; Attendance: 6617; Referee: J Powell

22 August 1960 2	Mansfield Town	0–2	Rochdale	Mansfield
		Report	Brown; Lord	Stadium: Field Mill; Attendance: 8130

27 August 1960 3	Rochdale	3–1	Exeter City	Rochdale
	Hepton 26'; Lord 70', 82'	Report	Wilkinson 66'	Stadium: Spotland Stadium; Attendance: 3099; Referee: E Crawford

30 August 1960 4	Rochdale	1–2	Mansfield Town	Rochdale
	Lord 87'	Report	Wagstaff	Stadium: Spotland Stadium; Attendance: 5547

3 September 1960 5	Peterborough United	4–3	Rochdale	Peterborough
	Hails 13'; McNamee 48'; Smith 72' (pen.), 89' (pen.)	Report	Lord 23', 81'; Cairns 61'	Stadium: London Road Stadium; Attendance: 14285; Referee: JK Taylor

6 September 1960 6	Carlisle United	1–2	Rochdale	Carlisle
	Smith	Report	Lord; Cairns	Stadium: Brunton Park; Attendance: 5262; Referee: K Howley

10 September 1960 7	Rochdale	0–1	Southport	Rochdale
		Report	Booth 73'	Stadium: Spotland Stadium; Attendance: 4654; Referee: WT Surtees

13 September 1960 8	Rochdale	2–1	Carlisle United	Rochdale
	Lord	Report	Walker 58'	Stadium: Spotland Stadium; Attendance: 4023

17 September 1960 9	Darlington	1–0	Rochdale	Darlington
	Baxter 56' (pen.)	Report		Stadium: Feethams; Attendance: 4641; Referee: P Rhodes

20 September 1960 10	Rochdale	3–0	Oldham Athletic	Rochdale
	Cairns; Lord; Ferguson (o.g.)	Report		Stadium: Spotland Stadium; Attendance: 7353

24 September 1960 11	Rochdale	2–2	Crystal Palace	Rochdale
	Hepton 41', 68'	Report	Petchey 10'; Summersby 19'	Stadium: Spotland Stadium; Attendance: 4819; Referee: J Bellwood

27 September 1960 12	Oldham Athletic	0–2	Rochdale	Oldham
		Report	Lord; Brown	Stadium: Boundary Park; Attendance: 6477

1 October 1960 13	Doncaster Rovers	3–2	Rochdale	Doncaster
	Broadbent 23', 40'; Walker 53'	Report	Cairns 47', 81'	Stadium: Belle Vue; Attendance: 3798; Referee: K Stokes

3 October 1960 14	Rochdale	4–0	Hartlepools United	Rochdale
	Lord 50', 70', 82'; Brown 88'	Report		Stadium: Spotland Stadium; Attendance: 3852; Referee: A Holland

8 October 1960 15	Rochdale	2–0	Chester	Rochdale
	Lord 41'; Hepton 49'	Report		Stadium: Spotland Stadium; Attendance: 3826; Referee: M Dixon

15 October 1960 16	Crewe Alexandra	3–0	Rochdale	Crewe
	Riley 48'; Llewellyn 80'; Wheatley 88'	Report		Stadium: Gresty Road; Attendance: 7256; Referee: H Horner

22 October 1960 17	Rochdale	0–0	York City	Rochdale
		Report		Stadium: Spotland Stadium; Attendance: 4889; Referee: PH Carr

29 October 1960 18	Accrington Stanley	2–0	Rochdale	Accrington
	Hudson 10'; Devine 12'	Report		Stadium: Peel Park; Attendance: 4243; Referee: JE Carr

12 November 1960 19	Barrow	1–0	Rochdale	Barrow-in-Furness
	Lowes 62'	Report		Stadium: Holker Street; Attendance: 3801; Referee: A Jobling

19 November 1960 20	Rochdale	2–0	Gillingham	Rochdale
	Cairns 9', 58'	Report		Stadium: Spotland Stadium; Attendance: 3044; Referee: W Robinson

3 December 1960 21	Rochdale	1–1	Northampton Town	Rochdale
	Lord 30'	Report	Lines 40'	Stadium: Spotland Stadium; Attendance: 2173; Referee: P Rhodes

10 December 1960 22	Aldershot	3–0	Rochdale	Aldershot
	Richards 24', 46', 84'	Report		Stadium: Recreation Ground; Attendance: 4930; Referee: DW Smith

26 December 1960 23	Rochdale	2–1	Wrexham	Rochdale
	Milburn (pen.); Cairns	Report	Roberts	Stadium: Spotland Stadium; Attendance: 3305

27 December 1960 24	Wrexham	2–0	Rochdale	Wrexham
	Metcalf; Harbertson	Report		Stadium: Racecourse Ground; Attendance: 6754

31 December 1960 25	Exeter City	1–0	Rochdale	Exeter
	Wilkinson 30'	Report		Stadium: St James Park; Attendance: 4365; Referee: GW Thorpe

7 January 1961 26	Bradford Park Avenue	2–1	Rochdale	Bradford
	Gibson 34'; Buchanan 87'	Report	Aspden (red card) 55'; Cairns 88'	Stadium: Park Avenue; Attendance: 7375; Referee: W Robinson

14 January 1961 Abandoned	Rochdale	1–0	Peterborough United	Rochdale
	Hepton			Stadium: Spotland Stadium; Attendance: 5424

21 January 1961 27	Southport	0–1	Rochdale	Southport
		Report	Hepton 40'	Stadium: Haig Avenue; Attendance: 3135; Referee: W Crossley

28 January 1961 28	Rochdale	4–0	Millwall	Rochdale
	Hepton 5'; Collins 72'; Lord 82'; Cairns 87'	Report		Stadium: Spotland Stadium; Attendance: 2840; Referee: A Holland

4 February 1961 29	Rochdale	1–0	Darlington	Rochdale
	Hepton 47'	Report		Stadium: Spotland Stadium; Attendance: 3171; Referee: H Webb

11 February 1961 30	Crystal Palace	4–1	Rochdale	London
	Heckman 19'; Bushby 46' (o.g.); Gavin 55', 87'	Report	Cairns 36'	Stadium: Selhurst Park; Attendance: 17675; Referee: MA Fussey

18 February 1961 31	Rochdale	2–1	Doncaster Rovers	Rochdale
	Norris 14'; Cairns 74'	Report	Brettell 31'	Stadium: Spotland Stadium; Attendance: 3173; Referee: LJ Tirebuck

25 February 1961 32	Chester	3–1	Rochdale	Chester
	Clempson 11'; Hughes 55' (pen.); Cooper 89'	Report	Pollitt 15'	Stadium: Sealand Road; Attendance: 3877; Referee: H Horner

4 March 1961 33	Rochdale	3–0	Crewe Alexandra	Rochdale
	Hepton 20'; Cairns 32', 49'	Report		Stadium: Spotland Stadium; Attendance: 4035

11 March 1961 34	York City	2–0	Rochdale	York
	Wragg 55', 87' (pen.)	Report		Stadium: Bootham Crescent; Attendance: 5477

18 March 1961 35	Rochdale	3–2	Accrington Stanley	Rochdale
	Cairns 20', 48'; Hepton 56'	Report	Swindells 29'; Smith 59'	Stadium: Spotland Stadium; Attendance: 4067

25 March 1961 36	Millwall	4–1	Rochdale	London
	Broadfoot 15', 53', 87', 88'	Report	Milburn 80' (pen.)	Stadium: The Den; Attendance: 7126

31 March 1961 37	Workington	3–0	Rochdale	Workington
	Dixon; Harburn	Report		Stadium: Borough Park; Attendance: 2871

1 April 1961 38	Rochdale	0–0	Barrow	Rochdale
		Report		Stadium: Spotland Stadium; Attendance: 2785

3 April 1961 39	Rochdale	2–0	Workington	Rochdale
	Cairns; Hepton	Report		Stadium: Spotland Stadium; Attendance: 3086

8 April 1961 40	Gillingham	0–0	Rochdale	Gillingham
		Report		Stadium: Priestfield Stadium; Attendance: 4807

10 April 1961 41	Rochdale	1–1	Stockport County	Rochdale
	Hepton	Report	Porteous (pen.)	Stadium: Spotland Stadium; Attendance: 3215

15 April 1961 42	Rochdale	2–3	Bradford Park Avenue	Rochdale
	Hepton 33'; Thompson 74' (pen.)	Report	Spratt 26' (pen.); Gibson 30'; Walker 78'	Stadium: Spotland Stadium; Attendance: 5342

18 April 1961 43	Rochdale	2–2	Peterborough United	Rochdale
	Cairns	Report	Smith; Bly	Stadium: Spotland Stadium; Attendance: 5424

22 April 1961 44	Northampton Town	5–1	Rochdale	Northampton
	Brown 34', 80'; Moran 68', 75', 82'	Report	Cairns 82'	Stadium: County Ground; Attendance: 9535

24 April 1961 45	Hartlepools United	2–0	Rochdale	Hartlepool
	Parkes	Report		Stadium: Victoria Park; Attendance: 3771

29 April 1961 46	Rochdale	1–1	Aldershot	Rochdale
	Barnes 33'	Report	Matthews 76'	Stadium: Spotland Stadium; Attendance: 2648

=== F.A. Cup ===
5 November 1960 1	Crewe Alexandra	1–1	Rochdale	Rochdale
	Coleman 72'	Report	Pollitt 29'	Stadium: Spotland Stadium; Attendance: 8923; Referee: FP Clarke

8 November 1960 1	Rochdale	1–2	Crewe Alexandra	Crewe
	Cairns	Report	Stark; Riley	Stadium: Gresty Road; Attendance: 7148

=== League Cup ===
10 October 1960 1	Rochdale	1–1	Scunthorpe United	Rochdale
	Lord	Report	Bonson	Stadium: Spotland Stadium; Attendance: 4274

20 October 1960 1	Scunthorpe United	0–1	Rochdale	Scunthorpe
		Report	Hepton	Stadium: Old Show Ground; Attendance: 5727

25 October 1960 2	Rochdale	5–2	Southend United	Rochdale
	Hepton 33'; Lord 44'; Cairns 73'; Barnes 87', 88'	Report	Houghton 25'; Laverty	Stadium: Spotland Stadium; Attendance: 3591

21 November 1960 3	Blackburn Rovers	2–1	Rochdale	Blackburn
	Crowe 2', 86'	Report	Richardson 44'	Stadium: Ewood Park; Attendance: 6316

=== Lancashire Cup ===
14 November 1960	Manchester City	0–1	Rochdale	Manchester
			Hepton	Stadium: Maine Road; Attendance: 2500

21 February 1961	Burnley	3–0	Rochdale	Rochdale
	Goal			Stadium: Turf Moor; Attendance: 4416
