= 1961–62 Rochdale A.F.C. season =

English football club season

Rochdale
1961–62 season
- Manager: Tony Collins
- League Division Four: 12th
- FA Cup: 2nd Round
- League Cup: Final
- Top goalscorer: League: Ronnie Cairns; All: Ronnie Cairns

The 1961–62 season was Rochdale A.F.C.'s 55th in existence and their 3rd in the Football League Fourth Division. This season also saw Rochdale reach final of the League Cup.

== Statistics ==
No.	Pos	Nat	Player	Total		League Division 4		FA Cup		League Cup		Lancashire Cup		Rose Bowl	
No.	Pos	Nat	Player	Apps	Goals	Apps	Goals	Apps	Goals	Apps	Goals	Apps	Goals	Apps	Goals
	GK	(England) ENG	Ted Burgin	58	0	44	0	2	0	9	0	2	0	1	0
	DF	(England) ENG	Stanley Milburn	54	5	42	4	2	1	9	0	0	0	1	0
	DF	(Scotland) SCO	Doug Winton	53	0	40	0	2	0	9	0	2	0	0	0
	MF	(England) ENG	Ron Phoenix	32	0	23	0	2	0	4	0	2	0	1	0
	MF	(England) ENG	Ray Aspden	51	1	38	1	1	0	8	0	3	0	1	0
	MF	(England) ENG	Jimmy Thompson	56	3	42	2	2	0	9	1	2	0	1	0
	MF	(England) ENG	Doug Wragg	52	11	39	9	2	0	8	0	2	0	1	2
	FW	(England) ENG	Stan Hepton	43	12	35	8	1	1	6	3	1	0	0	0
	FW	(England) ENG	Louis Bimpson	44	15	33	11	1	0	7	4	2	0	1	0
	FW	(England) ENG	Ronnie Cairns	59	20	44	15	2	1	9	2	3	2	1	0
	MF	(England) ENG	Colin Whitaker	57	9	44	8	2	0	9	1	1	0	1	0
	DF	(England) ENG	Norman Bodell	24	1	18	1	0	0	4	0	2	0	0	0
	FW	(England) ENG	Joe Richardson	27	11	23	9	0	0	4	2	0	0	0	0
	DF	(England) ENG	Bryn Owen	8	0	5	0	0	0	0	0	2	0	1	0
	DF	(England) ENG	John Hardman	12	1	8	1	1	0	1	0	2	0	0	0
	FW	(England) ENG	Brian Birch	3	0	1	0	1	0	0	0	1	0	0	0
	FW	(England) ENG	Peter Whyke	10	0	5	0	1	0	1	0	3	0	0	0
	GK	(Scotland) SCO	Joffre Mckay	1	0	0	0	0	0	0	0	1	0	0	0

== Final League Table ==
Pos	Team	Pld	W	D	L	GF	GA	GAv	Pts
10	Crewe Alexandra	44	20	6	18	79	70	1.129	46
11	Oldham Athletic	44	17	12	15	77	70	1.100	46
12	Rochdale	44	19	7	18	71	71	1.000	45
13	Darlington	44	18	9	17	61	73	0.836	45
14	Mansfield Town	44	19	6	19	77	66	1.167	44

Source: rsssf.com

== Competitions ==
=== Football League Fourth Division ===
19 August 1961 1	Rochdale	3–1	Hartlepools United	Rochdale
	Cairns 36'; Whitaker 53'; Milburn 87' (pen.)	Report	Milburn 23' (o.g.)	Stadium: Spotland Stadium; Attendance: 2400; Referee: J Powell

23 August 1961 2	Rochdale	4–1	Millwall	Rochdale
	Bimpson; Cairns; Wragg; Milburn (pen.)	Report	Burridge	Stadium: Spotland Stadium; Attendance: 3346

26 August 1961 3	Crewe Alexandra	2–1	Rochdale	Crewe
	Smith 20'; Lord 48'	Report	Cairns 8'	Stadium: Gresty Road; Attendance: 6731; Referee: S Yates

28 August 1961 4	Millwall	1–1	Rochdale	London
	Wilson	Report	Cairns	Stadium: The Den; Attendance: 11672

2 September 1961 5	Rochdale	3–0	Exeter City	Rochdale
	Whitaker 15', 20'; Milburn 27' (pen.)	Report		Stadium: Spotland Stadium; Attendance: 5062; Referee: GW Grundy

6 September 1961 6	Rochdale	3–1	Gillingham	Rochdale
	Cairns; Hepton	Report	Proverbs	Stadium: Spotland Stadium; Attendance: 5239

9 September 1961 7	Wrexham	3–0	Rochdale	Wrexham
	Bennion 2', 74'; Davies 84'	Report		Stadium: Racecourse Ground; Attendance: 11982; Referee: KH Burns

16 September 1961 8	Rochdale	2–3	Doncaster Rovers	Rochdale
	Hepton 1'; Bimpson 20'	Report	Veall 11'; Ballagher 27'; Leighton 76'	Stadium: Spotland Stadium; Attendance: 5138

18 September 1961 9	Darlington	2–0	Rochdale	Darlington
	Windross; Martin	Report		Stadium: Feethams; Attendance: 7908; Referee: H Webb

23 September 1961 10	Workington	2–1	Rochdale	Workington
	Commons 9'; Wilson 65'	Report	Wragg 83'	Stadium: Borough Park; Attendance: 3659; Referee: HG Wilson

30 September 1961 11	Rochdale	3–1	York City	Rochdale
	Hepton 38'; Bimpson 42', 83'	Report	Weir 28'	Stadium: Spotland Stadium; Attendance: 4201; Referee: KR Tuck

11 October 1961 12	Rochdale	1–1	Chesterfield	Rochdale
	Cairns 19'	Report	Kerry	Stadium: Spotland Stadium; Attendance: 4827

14 October 1961 13	Oldham Athletic	2–2	Rochdale	Oldham
	Frizzell 17', 42'	Report	Cairns 13'; Bimpson 36'	Stadium: Boundary Park; Attendance: 17029; Referee: J Powell

18 October 1961 14	Rochdale	1–3	Darlington	Rochdale
	Wragg	Report	Martin; Rayment; Carr	Stadium: Spotland Stadium; Attendance: 3702

21 October 1961 15	Rochdale	3–3	Stockport County	Rochdale
	Hepton 43'; Cairns 74'; Bimpson 75'	Report	Anderson 35'; Ward 53'; Murdoch 54'	Stadium: Spotland Stadium; Attendance: 4413; Referee: HP Hackney

28 October 1961 16	Aldershot	3–0	Rochdale	Aldershot
	Woan 17'; Hasty 60'; Howfield 85'	Report		Stadium: Recreation Ground; Attendance: 7420; Referee: PG Brandwood

11 November 1961 17	Carlisle United	2–2	Rochdale	Carlisle
	Taylor 23'; Brayton 32'	Report	Hepton 78'; Hardman 87'	Stadium: Brunton Park; Attendance: 5263; Referee: HG Wilson

18 November 1961 18	Rochdale	0–1	Colchester United	Rochdale
		Report	Hunt 80'	Stadium: Spotland Stadium; Attendance: 4618; Referee: G McCabe

2 December 1961 19	Rochdale	1–0	Tranmere Rovers	Rochdale
	Cairns 42'	Report		Stadium: Spotland Stadium; Attendance: 2872; Referee: KR Tuck

9 December 1961 20	Southport	3–0	Rochdale	Southport
	Blain 68', 85'; Jones 71' (pen.)	Report		Stadium: Haig Avenue; Attendance: 4712

16 December 1961 21	Hartlepools United	3–1	Rochdale	Hartlepool
	Edgar 38', 62'; Folland 71'	Report	Richardson 63'	Stadium: Victoria Park; Attendance: 2387

26 December 1961 22	Mansfield Town	0–1	Rochdale	Mansfield
		Report	Richardson	Stadium: Field Mill; Attendance: 6357

13 January 1962 23	Exeter City	1–3	Rochdale	Exeter
	Carter 72'	Report	Richardson 33', 56'; Cairns 75'	Stadium: St James Park; Attendance: 4003

20 January 1962 24	Rochdale	2–1	Wrexham	Rochdale
	Barnes 42' (o.g.); Hepton 61'	Report	Davies 53'	Stadium: Spotland Stadium; Attendance: 4208

27 January 1962 25	Chester	2–3	Rochdale	Chester
	Davies 61'; Aspden 76' (o.g.)	Report	Richardson 13'; Wragg 25', 79'	Stadium: Sealand Road; Attendance: 4082

31 January 1962 26	Rochdale	4–1	Bradford City	Rochdale
	Thompson; Richardson; Cairns; Hepton	Report	Layne	Stadium: Spotland Stadium; Attendance: 1998

3 February 1962 27	Doncaster Rovers	1–2	Rochdale	Doncaster
	Bonson 28'	Report	Bodell 77'; Whitaker 84'	Stadium: Belle Vue; Attendance: 4032

10 February 1962 28	Rochdale	1–3	Workington	Rochdale
	Hepton 89'	Report	Commons 40', 44'; Haasz 47'	Stadium: Spotland Stadium; Attendance: 4016

17 February 1962 29	York City	2–1	Rochdale	York
	Jackson 23'; Weir 38'	Report	Richardson 87'	Stadium: Bootham Crescent; Attendance: 5168

3 March 1962 30	Rochdale	3–1	Oldham Athletic	Rochdale
	Bimpson 65'; Cairns 72'; Wragg 80'	Report	Johnstone 30'	Stadium: Spotland Stadium; Attendance: 9213

9 March 1962 31	Stockport County	5–2	Rochdale	Stockport
	Ward; Murray; Whitelaw; McDonnell	Report	Whitaker; Wragg	Stadium: Edgeley Park; Attendance: 4248

13 March 1962 32	Rochdale	3–0	Crewe Alexandra	Rochdale
	Wragg; Bimpson; Thompson	Report		Stadium: Spotland Stadium; Attendance: 3809

17 March 1962 33	Rochdale	1–0	Aldershot	Rochdale
	Cairns 80'	Report		Stadium: Spotland Stadium; Attendance: 3627

23 March 1962 34	Bradford City	1–0	Rochdale	Bradford
	McCole	Report		Stadium: Valley Parade; Attendance: 6652

31 March 1962 35	Rochdale	1–1	Carlisle United	Rochdale
	Whitaker 38'	Report	Martin 4'	Stadium: Spotland Stadium; Attendance: 2453

7 April 1962 36	Colchester United	1–1	Rochdale	Colchester
	Hunt 70'	Report	Richardson 79'	Stadium: Layer Road; Attendance: 4616

11 April 1962 37	Rochdale	3–2	Mansfield Town	Rochdale
	Richardson; Bimpson; Aspden	Report	Hollett; Morris	Stadium: Spotland Stadium; Attendance: 3045

14 April 1962 38	Rochdale	3–2	Chester	Rochdale
	Bimpson 36'; Whitaker 79'; Cairns 80'	Report	Hennin 6'; Myerscough 38'	Stadium: Spotland Stadium; Attendance: 3061

16 April 1962 39	Chesterfield	1–0	Rochdale	Chesterfield
	Clarke (pen.)	Report		Stadium: Saltergate Recreation Ground; Attendance: 2932

20 April 1962 40	Barrow	0–1	Rochdale	Barrow-in-Furness
		Report	Wragg	Stadium: Holker Street; Attendance: 6732

21 April 1962 41	Tranmere Rovers	2–0	Rochdale	Birkenhead
	Arnell 18', 29'	Report		Stadium: Prenton Park; Attendance: 3720

23 April 1962 42	Rochdale	0–2	Barrow	Rochdale
		Report	Brown; Kemp	Stadium: Spotland Stadium; Attendance: 4008

28 April 1962 43	Rochdale	2–0	Southport	Rochdale
	English 14' (o.g.); Bimpson 83'	Report		Stadium: Spotland Stadium; Attendance: 1940

3 May 1962 44	Gillingham	4–2	Rochdale	Gillingham
	Hughes; Livesey; Pulley; Waldock	Report	Milburn; Whitaker	Stadium: Priestfield Stadium; Attendance: 2964

==== Expunged Games ====
7 October 1961	Rochdale	1–0	Accrington Stanley	Rochdale
	Whitaker 67'			Stadium: Spotland Stadium; Attendance: 5364; Referee: E Crawford

24 February 1962	Accrington Stanley	0–2	Rochdale	Accrington
			Bimpson 8'; Cairns 89'	Stadium: Peel Park; Attendance: 2650

=== F.A. Cup ===
4 November 1961 1	Rochdale	2–0	Halifax Town	Rochdale
	Milburn 7' (pen.); Hepton 74'	Report		Stadium: Spotland Stadium; Attendance: 6368

25 November 1961 2	Rochdale	1–2	Wrexham	Rochdale
	Cairns 68'	Report	Metcalf 26'; Bennion 46'	Stadium: Spotland Stadium; Attendance: 8741

=== League Cup ===
13 September 1961 1	Southampton	0–0	Rochdale	Southampton
		Report		Stadium: The Dell; Attendance: 7783

27 September 1961 1	Rochdale	2–1	Southampton	Rochdale
	Bimpson 50', 56'	Report	Reeves 90'	Stadium: Spotland Stadium; Attendance: 5449

4 October 1961 2	Rochdale	4–0	Doncaster Rovers	Rochdale
	Bimpson; Hepton; Cairns	Report		Stadium: Spotland Stadium; Attendance: 5476

14 November 1961 3	Rochdale	1–0	Charlton Athletic	Rochdale
	Whitaker	Report		Stadium: Spotland Stadium; Attendance: 5298

7 February 1962 4	Rochdale	2–1	York City	Rochdale
	Hepton; Thompson	Report	Wragg (pen.)	Stadium: Spotland Stadium; Attendance: 7312

19 March 1962 SF1	Rochdale	3–1	Blackburn Rovers	Rochdale
	Richardson 61', 80'; Cairns 89'	Report	Douglas 88'	Stadium: Spotland Stadium; Attendance: 9828

4 April 1962 SF2	Blackburn Rovers	2–1 (3–4 agg.)	Rochdale	Blackburn
	Pickering 9' (pen.); Douglas 52'	Report	Hepton 17'	Stadium: Ewood Park; Attendance: 11700

26 April 1962 F1	Rochdale	0–3	Norwich City	Rochdale
		Report	Lythgoe 3', 15'; Punton 84'	Stadium: Spotland Stadium; Attendance: 11123; Referee: Arthur Holland

1 May 1962 F2	Norwich City	1–0 (4–0 agg.)	Rochdale	Norwich
	Hill 75'	Report		Stadium: Carrow Road; Attendance: 19709; Referee: Ron H Mann

=== Lancashire Cup ===
25 October 1961 1	Rochdale	1–0	Everton	Rochdale
	Cairns			Stadium: Spotland Stadium; Attendance: 1971

17 April 1962 2	Liverpool	0–0	Rochdale	Liverpool
				Stadium: Anfield; Attendance: 2600

7 May 1962 2 (replay)	Rochdale	1–3	Liverpool	Rochdale
	Cairns		Goal	Stadium: Spotland Stadium; Attendance: 1799

=== Rose Bowl ===
12 August 1961 1	Oldham Athletic	1–2	Rochdale	Oldham
	Goal		Wragg	Stadium: Boundary Park; Attendance: 9525
