= List of footballers in England by number of league appearances =

The following is a list of the 941 footballers who have made at least 500 domestic league appearances in English league football. This includes the appearances and goals of current and former players in the Premier League and English Football League.

Peter Shilton has made the most appearances, and is the only player to have played in over one thousand games. Chris O'Grady made appearances for 17 different clubs, while 49 players made their appearances for only one team. Frank Womack is the only outfield player who failed to score a goal in his appearances, while Arthur Rowley scored 433. Stanley Matthews made his appearances during a career spanning 34 seasons.

== List of players ==
=== Key ===
★	English Football Hall of Fame inductee

Players still active in the English leagues are listed in bold

As of 14:56, 16 November 2026 (UTC)

Player	Nationality	Games (Note: Number of League games only. Play-off games (1987 to date) and Test Matches (1893 to 1898) are not included)	Goals (Note: Number of League goals only. Goals scored in Play-off games (1987 to date) and Test Matches (1893 to 1898) are not included)	Position	Career span (Note: Displays first and last seasons where appearances made. For example, 1972–1994 displayed where first appearance was in the 1972–73 season and last appearance was in the 1993–94 season)	Seasons (Note: Number of League seasons only)	Clubs (Note: Number of different clubs where League appearances made; two or more spells with the same club are counted only once)	Notes
Peter Shilton★	England	1,005	1	GK	1965–1997	32	8	
Tony Ford	England	931	108	MF	1975–2002	27	8	
Graham Alexander	Scotland	833	107	DF	1990–2012	22	4	
Terry Paine	England	824	168	FW	1956–1977	21	2	
Dean Lewington	England	820	22	DF	2002–2025	23	2	
Tommy Hutchison	Scotland	794	51	MF	1967–1991	24	5	
Luke Chambers	England	791	38	DF	2002–2023	21	4	
Neil Redfearn	England	790	158	MF	1982–2004	22	13	
David James	England	788	0	GK	1990–2013	23	8	
Robbie James	Wales	781	137	MF	1972–1994	22	6	
Peter Clarke	England	778	56	DF	2000–2023	23	11	
Alan Oakes	England	776	41	MF	1959–1984	25	3	
Dave Beasant	England	773	0	GK	1979–2003	24	10	
John Trollope	England	770	22	DF	1960–1981	21	1	
Jimmy Dickinson	England	764	9	DF	1946–1965	19	1	
Roy Sproson	England	760	30	DF	1950–1972	22	1	
Mick Tait	England	760	91	MF	1974–1997	23	7	
Billy Bonds★	England	758	49	DF	1964–1988	24	2	
Ray Clemence★	England	758	0	GK	1965–1988	23	3	
Pat Jennings★	Northern Ireland	757	0	GK	1962–1985	23	3	
Frank Worthington	England	757	234	FW	1966–1988	22	11	
Jamie Cureton	England	755	263	FW	1994–2016	22	13	
Wayne Allison	England	752	171	FW	1986–2008	22	9	
Ernie Moss	England	749	245	FW	1968–1988	20	11	
Les Chapman	England	747	36	MF	1966–1988	22	7	
Asa Hartford	Scotland	744	63	MF	1967–1991	24	9	
Alan Ball Jr.★	England	743	169	MF	1962–1984	22	5	
John Hollins	England	743	63	MF	1963–1984	21	3	
Phil Parkes	England	743	0	GK	1968–1991	23	4	
Steve Bruce	England	737	81	DF	1979–1999	20	5	
Teddy Sheringham★	England	734	276	FW	1983–2008	25	8	
Mick Mills	England	732	25	DF	1965–1988	23	3	
Ian Callaghan★	England	731	51	MF	1959–1982	23	3	
David Seaman★	England	731	0	GK	1982–2004	22	5	
**Albert Adomah**	Ghana	729	99	FW	2007–	20	8	
Steve Perryman	England	725	31	MF	1969–1990	21	3	
Martin Peters★	England	722	175	MF	1961–1981	20	4	
Billy Sharp	England	721	265	FW	2004–2026	22	9	
Mick Channon	England	717	232	FW	1965–1986	21	6	
Ron Harris	England	716	13	DF	1961–1984	23	2	
Mike Summerbee★	England	716	92	FW	1959–1980	21	5	
Glenn Cockerill	England	714	86	MF	1976–1998	22	7	
Keith Curle	England	708	35	DF	1981–2003	22	10	
Phil Neal	England	706	72	DF	1968–1989	21	3	
John Wile	England	705	34	MF	1967–1986	19	2	
Steve Fletcher	England	704	112	FW	1990–2013	23	4	
Rob Lee	England	703	105	MF	1983–2006	23	6	
Andy Melville	Wales	703	54	MF	1985–2005	20	7	
Neville Southall★	Wales	701	0	GK	1980–2000	20	7	
Mick Gooding	England	700	94	MF	1979–2000	21	6	
Steve Howard	Scotland	700	188	FW	1995–2014	19	6	
Paul Futcher	England	698	2	DF	1972–1995	23	8	
Stanley Matthews★ (Note: Stanley Matthews made an additional three Football League appearances in 1939–40 before the season was abandoned. These are not included in his total)	England	697	71	MF	1931–1965	34	2	
Roy Tunks	England	694	0	GK	1967–1990	23	5	
Roger Jones	England	693	0	GK	1965–1985	20	7	
Derek Fazackerley	England	692	23	DF	1970–1989	19	4	
Scott McGleish	England	692	208	FW	1994–2012	18	9	
Ivor Allchurch★	Wales	691	249	FW	1949–1968	19	3	
John Burridge	England	691	0	GK	1968–1996	28	15	
Kevin Davies	England	689	123	FW	1993–2015	22	7	
James Coppinger	England	688	77	MF	2000–2021	21	5	
Kevin Ellison	England	687	124	FW	2000–2022	22	11	
Nigel Winterburn	England	687	17	DF	1983–2003	20	3	
Alan Knight	England	683	0	GK	1977–2000	23	1	
Denis Irwin★	Republic of Ireland	682	29	DF	1983–2004	21	4	
Gareth Barry	England	680	54	MF	1997–2020	23	4	
Jonny Howson	England	680	54	MF	2006–2025	19	3	
Billy Meredith★	Wales	680	180	FW	1893–1924	31	3	
Trevor Cherry	England	679	36	DF	1966–1985	19	3	
Norman Hunter★	England	679	22	DF	1962–1983	21	3	
Alec Chamberlain	England	678	0	GK	1982–2007	25	5	
Paul Robinson	England	678	15	DF	1996–2018	22	5	
Gary Speed★	Wales	677	104	MF	1988–2009	21	5	
Alan Mullery★	England	676	62	MF	1958–1976	18	2	
Paul Stancliffe	England	676	22	DF	1975–1995	20	4	
Rob Newman	England	674	77	DF	1981–2002	21	4	
Pop Robson	England	674	265	FW	1964–1986	22	5	
Geraint Williams	Wales	674	20	MF	1980–1999	19	4	
Paul Simpson	England	673	150	MF	1982–2006	24	9	
Ryan Giggs★	Wales	672	114	MF	1990–2014	24	1	
Peter Beagrie	England	670	90	MF	1984–2007	23	10	
Michael Doyle	Republic of Ireland	669	36	MF	2003–2019	16	5	
Steve Foster	England	669	42	DF	1975–1996	21	5	
Bobby Moore★	England	668	25	DF	1958–1977	19	2	
Chris Powell	England	667	6	DF	1988–2010	22	8	
Nigel Martyn	England	666	0	GK	1987–2006	19	4	
Adebayo Akinfenwa	England	664	195	FW	2003–2022	19	11	
Dean Kiely	Republic of Ireland	664	0	GK	1990–2011	21	6	
James Milner	England	664	58	MF	2002–2026	24	7	
Marcus Stewart	England	664	199	FW	1991–2011	20	8	
Mike Keen	England	663	55	MF	1959–1975	16	3	
Kevin Hector	England	662	268	FW	1962–1982	20	2	
Martin Dobson	England	661	96	MF	1967–1986	19	3	
Gary McAllister	Scotland	661	112	MF	1985–2004	19	4	
Dave Watson	England	660	65	DF	1966–1985	19	7	
Marco Gabbiadini	England	659	222	FW	1984–2004	20	10	
Colin Greenall	England	659	40	DF	1980–1999	19	8	
Phil Jagielka	England	659	34	DF	1999–2023	24	4	
Gary Jones	England	659	87	MF	1997–2015	18	5	
Peter Beardsley★	England	658	208	FW	1979–1999	20	8	
Richard Keogh	Republic of Ireland	658	19	DF	2005–2024	19	11	
Matthew Taylor	England	658	84	MF	1999–2019	20	7	
**Ian Henderson**	England	657	174	FW	2002–	25	7	
John Jackson	England	656	0	GK	1964–1983	19	5	
Leighton James	Wales	656	123	MF	1970–1989	19	7	
Mike Walker	Wales	656	0	GK	1964–1983	19	5	
Steve Thompson	England	655	85	MF	1982–2001	19	6	
Richard Walden	England	655	19	DF	1964–1982	18	3	
Mike Flynn	England	654	25	DF	1987–2005	18	6	
Ian McDonald	England	654	91	MF	1970–1989	19	6	
Billy Bremner★	Scotland	653	96	MF	1959–1982	23	3	
**Marlon Pack**	England	653	41	MF	2009–	18	6	
Phil Brown	England	652	46	DF	1979–1996	17	4	
Peter Jackson	England	651	38	DF	1978–1997	19	4	
Ian Breckin	England	650	26	DF	1993–2011	18	4	
Peter Downsborough	England	650	0	GK	1959–1979	20	4	
Graham Turner	England	650	27	DF	1964–1984	20	3	
George Foster	England	649	9	DF	1973–1993	20	5	
David Eyres	England	648	127	MF	1989–2006	17	4	
Ron Hillyard	England	647	0	GK	1969–1991	22	3	
Kevin Keelan	England	647	0	GK	1959–1980	21	4	
John McDermott	England	647	11	DF	1986–2007	21	1	
Garry Nelson	England	647	136	FW	1979–1997	18	7	
Chris Nicholl	Northern Ireland	647	28	DF	1968–1985	17	5	
Darren Pratley	England	647	50	MF	2003–2025	22	6	
Iwan Roberts	Wales	647	202	FW	1985–2005	20	7	
Paul Hall	Jamaica	646	110	MF	1989–2008	19	11	
Steve White	England	646	223	FW	1977–1998	21	7	
Bobby Charlton★	England	644	207	MF	1956–1975	19	2	
Michael Morrison	England	644	35	DF	2008–2026	18	7	
Ritchie Humphreys	England	643	47	MF	1995–2017	22	7	
Mervyn Day	England	642	0	GK	1973–1994	21	7	
Steve Claridge	England	641	195	FW	1984–2007	23	16	
Chris Kamara	England	641	71	MF	1975–1995	20	9	
Colin Todd	England	641	10	DF	1966–1985	19	7	
John Wark	Scotland	641	165	MF	1974–1997	23	3	
Dele Adebola	Nigeria	639	138	FW	1994–2012	18	11	
James Hayter	England	639	152	FW	1996–2015	19	3	
Steve Wignall	England	639	29	DF	1972–1991	19	4	
Ronnie Allen	England	638	276	FW	1946–1965	19	3	
Adam Barrett	England	638	45	DF	1999–2017	18	9	
Tommy Mooney	England	638	185	FW	1990–2008	18	11	
Mick Stockwell	England	638	57	MF	1985–2003	18	2	
Clinton Morrison	Republic of Ireland	637	152	FW	1997–2016	19	8	
Kenny Sansom	England	637	10	DF	1974–1995	21	8	
**Lucas Akins**	England	635	118	FW	2006–	21	5	
Lee Dixon	England	635	37	DF	1982–2002	20	5	
Brian Tinnion	England	635	60	MF	1986–2005	19	3	
Dave Watson	England	635	33	DF	1980–2000	20	2	
Nicky Southall	England	634	67	MF	1991–2009	18	6	
Wes Morgan	Jamaica	634	24	DF	2003–2021	18	3	
Peter Broadbent	England	632	138	FW	1950–1970	20	5	
Colin Calderwood	Scotland	632	27	DF	1981–2001	20	6	
Emlyn Hughes★	England	632	43	MF	1965–1984	19	6	
Joe Shaw	England	632	7	MF	1948–1966	18	1	
Willie Morgan	Scotland	631	58	FW	1962–1982	20	5	
Tom Lees	England	630	22	DF	2009–2026	17	6	
Lindsay Smith	England	630	49	MF	1970–1989	19	6	
Jack Charlton★	England	629	70	DF	1952–1973	21	1	
Roger Freestone	Wales	629	3	GK	1986–2004	18	4	
Tommy Tynan	England	629	252	FW	1975–1992	17	8	
Ian Bowyer	England	628	103	MF	1968–1990	22	5	
Kevin Miller	England	628	0	GK	1988–2007	19	8	
Les Robinson	England	628	18	DF	1984–2002	18	4	
Des Walker	England	628	1	DF	1983–2005	22	2	
Brian Deane	England	627	186	FW	1985–2006	21	7	
Mike Doyle	England	627	40	DF	1964–1984	20	4	
Paul Groves	England	627	101	MF	1987–2004	17	6	
Trevor Peake	England	627	13	DF	1979–1998	19	3	
Jimmy Case	England	626	46	MF	1974–1996	22	7	
Steve Doyle	Wales	626	19	MF	1974–1995	21	5	
Paul Jones	England	626	49	DF	1970–1990	20	6	
Danny Wilson	Northern Ireland	626	96	MF	1977–1995	18	8	
Kenny Swain	England	625	32	DF	1973–1992	19	6	
Kevin Moore	England	623	43	DF	1976–1996	20	5	
Mark Rankine	England	623	33	MF	1987–2006	19	5	
Brian Talbot	England	623	84	MF	1973–1992	19	7	
Gordon Nisbet	England	622	15	DF	1969–1988	19	4	
Paul Merson	England	621	125	FW	1986–2006	20	6	
Graham Cross	England	620	33	DF	1960–1979	19	5	
Sean Gregan	England	620	19	MF	1991–2011	20	5	
Tony Brown	England	619	229	MF	1963–1983	20	2	
Geoff Crudgington	England	619	0	GK	1970–1988	18	5	
David Nugent	England	619	155	FW	2001–2021	20	9	
Arthur Rowley	England	619	433	FW	1946–1965	19	4	
Frank Lampard Jr.★	England	618	178	MF	1995–2015	20	4	
**David McGoldrick**	Republic of Ireland	618	178	FW	2003–	24	12	
Clive Platt	England	618	110	FW	1996–2015	19	9	
Dave Blakey	England	617	20	DF	1948–1967	19	1	
Brian Borrows	England	617	11	DF	1981–1999	18	5	
Bob Hatton	England	617	215	FW	1966–1983	17	9	
Andy Sinton	England	617	75	MF	1982–2002	20	6	
Jack Ashurst	Scotland	616	13	DF	1972–1993	21	6	
Dave Reeves	England	616	168	FW	1986–2004	18	9	
Neil Aspin	England	615	8	DF	1981–2001	20	4	
Wade Elliott	England	615	62	MF	1999–2015	16	4	
Peter Morris	England	615	67	MF	1960–1980	20	4	
Cole Skuse	England	615	12	MF	2004–2023	19	3	
Micky Cook	England	614	21	DF	1969–1984	15	1	
Nicky Forster	England	614	190	FW	1992–2011	19	9	
Jobi McAnuff	Jamaica	614	59	MF	2001–2021	20	8	
Bob McKinlay	Scotland	614	9	DF	1951–1970	19	1	
Matt Oakley	England	614	33	MF	1994–2017	23	4	
Barry Siddall	England	614	0	GK	1972–1993	21	13	
Frank Stapleton	Republic of Ireland	614	151	FW	1974–1995	21	8	
Andy Crosby	England	613	39	DF	1991–2009	18	6	
Kelvin Davis	England	613	0	GK	1993–2016	23	7	
Howard Kendall	England	613	65	MF	1962–1982	20	5	
Paul Musselwhite	England	613	0	GK	1988–2011	23	5	
Ally Robertson	Scotland	613	8	DF	1969–1990	21	2	
Joe Spence	England	613	195	FW	1919–1938	19	3	
David Felgate	Wales	612	0	GK	1978–1996	18	8	
Chris Martin	Scotland	612	164	FW	2006–2025	19	11	
Steve Charles	England	611	105	MF	1979–1996	17	5	
Brian Clark	England	611	217	FW	1960–1979	19	6	
Steve Ogrizovic	England	611	1	GK	1977–2000	23	4	
Tommy Robson	England	611	142	MF	1961–1981	20	4	
Brian Horton	England	610	74	MF	1970–1987	17	4	
Ronnie Moore	England	610	158	FW	1971–1989	18	5	
Stephen Quinn	Republic of Ireland	610	37	MF	2006–2025	19	7	
Sam Vokes	Wales	610	124	FW	2006–2026	20	11	
John Aldridge	Republic of Ireland	609	329	FW	1979–1998	19	4	
John Deary	England	609	76	MF	1980–1997	17	3	
Robert Green	England	609	0	GK	1998–2017	19	4	
Ernie Hine	England	609	288	FW	1921–1938	17	5	
Frank McLintock★	Scotland	609	56	DF	1959–1977	18	3	
Cyrille Regis★	England	609	159	FW	1977–1996	19	6	
Glenn Whelan	Republic of Ireland	609	20	MF	2003–2023	20	6	
Ashley Williams	Wales	609	22	DF	2003–2020	17	5	
Frank Gray	Scotland	608	47	DF	1972–1992	20	4	
Warren Joyce	England	608	79	MF	1982–2000	18	5	
Gary Mabbutt	England	608	37	DF	1978–1998	20	2	
Sammy McIlroy	Northern Ireland	608	80	MF	1971–1990	19	5	
Jimmy Montgomery	England	608	0	GK	1961–1979	18	3	
Ken Mulhearn	England	608	0	GK	1964–1982	18	4	
Gerry Peyton	Republic of Ireland	608	0	GK	1975–1993	18	7	
Jack Brownsword	England	607	50	DF	1946–1965	19	2	
Wyn Davies	Wales	607	179	FW	1960–1978	18	9	
Rickie Lambert	England	607	218	FW	1999–2017	18	9	
Hayden Mullins	England	607	28	MF	1998–2015	17	6	
Marc Richards	England	607	186	FW	2001–2020	19	11	
Keith Welch	England	607	0	GK	1986–2003	17	6	
Colin Cooper	England	606	37	DF	1985–2006	21	4	
Arfon Griffiths	Wales	606	122	MF	1959–1979	20	3	
Cameron Jerome	England	606	133	FW	2004–2024	20	8	
John Sheridan	Republic of Ireland	606	88	MF	1982–2004	22	5	
Chris Lucketti	England	605	22	DF	1988–2009	21	7	
Jim Stannard	England	605	1	GK	1980–1999	19	4	
Ian Baraclough	England	604	40	DF	1989–2008	19	8	
Colin Sullivan	England	604	11	DF	1967–1986	19	6	
Gary Bennett	England	603	61	DF	1981–2000	19	5	
Simon Garner	England	603	193	FW	1978–1996	18	4	
Bob Kelly	England	603	156	FW	1913–1936	23	5	
Mickey Thomas	Wales	603	77	MF	1971–1993	22	10	
Aaron Wilbraham	England	603	131	FW	1997–2020	23	10	
**Barry Bannan**	Scotland	602	41	MF	2008–	19	8	
Jabo Ibehre	England	602	121	FW	1999–2020	21	10	
Derek Parkin	England	602	7	DF	1964–1983	19	3	
Jimmy Scoular	Scotland	602	19	MF	1946–1964	18	3	
Kevin Wilson	Northern Ireland	602	149	FW	1979–2001	22	7	
Len Allchurch	Wales	601	108	FW	1950–1971	21	3	
Dion Dublin	England	601	182	FW	1988–2008	20	7	
Kevin Hodges	England	601	85	MF	1978–1997	19	2	
David Phillips	Wales	601	62	MF	1981–2000	19	7	
Alan Stevenson	England	601	0	GK	1969–1985	16	4	
Richie Wellens	England	601	40	MF	1999–2016	17	7	
Peter Bonetti	England	600	0	GK	1959–1979	20	1	
Peter Hart	England	600	19	DF	1973–1990	17	2	
Danny Murphy	England	600	79	MF	1993–2013	20	6	
Steve Bloomer★	England	599	352	FW	1892–1914	22	2	
Albert Iremonger	England	599	0	GK	1904–1927	23	2	
Joe Murphy	Republic of Ireland	599	0	GK	1999–2026	27	8	
Jon Stead	England	599	136	FW	2002–2021	19	12	
**James Collins**	Republic of Ireland	598	201	FW	2009–	18	12	
Tony Craig	England	598	15	DF	2002–2023	21	7	
John Gregory	England	598	83	MF	1972–1990	18	7	
Ian Lawther	Northern Ireland	598	180	FW	1959–1976	17	6	
Andy Linighan	England	598	30	DF	1980–2001	21	8	
John Atyeo	England	597	314	FW	1950–1966	16	2	
**Luke Ayling**	England	597	18	DF	2009–	18	4	
Paul Butler	Republic of Ireland	597	26	DF	1990–2009	19	7	
Stewart Downing	England	597	50	FW	2001–2021	20	6	
Ian Holloway	England	597	50	MF	1980–1999	19	4	
**Oliver Norwood**	Northern Ireland	597	41	MF	2010–	17	9	
Warwick Rimmer	England	597	17	DF	1967–1986	19	2	
Lee Duxbury	England	596	66	MF	1988–2004	16	5	
Dave Gwyther	Wales	596	160	FW	1965–1985	20	5	
John Lukic	England	596	0	GK	1979–2001	22	2	
John MacPhail	Scotland	596	58	DF	1978–1995	17	5	
Harold Bell	England	595	11	DF	1946–1960	14	1	
Andy Butler	England	595	48	DF	2003–2021	18	7	
Curtis Davies	England	595	28	DF	2003–2024	21	8	
Roger Gibbins	England	595	69	MF	1975–1993	18	7	
Antony Kay	England	595	49	DF	2000–2019	19	6	
Don Masson	Scotland	595	117	MF	1964–1982	18	5	
Darren Moore	Jamaica	595	31	DF	1991–2012	21	8	
Russell Osman	England	595	34	DF	1977–1996	19	6	
George Wood	Scotland	595	0	GK	1971–1991	20	6	
Viv Anderson★	England	594	37	DF	1974–1995	21	6	
Michael Bell	England	594	51	DF	1989–2007	18	5	
Gordon Cowans	England	594	51	MF	1975–1998	23	8	
Tony Gale	England	594	24	DF	1977–1996	19	4	
Johnny Haynes★	England	594	146	FW	1952–1970	18	1	
Joey Jones	Wales	594	27	DF	1972–1992	20	4	
Paul Reaney	England	594	6	DF	1962–1980	18	2	
Steve Vickers	England	594	20	DF	1985–2003	18	4	
Duncan Welbourne	England	594	27	DF	1957–1976	19	3	
Andy Williams	England	594	128	FW	2006–2023	17	8	
John Hore	England	593	17	DF	1964–1980	16	2	
Steve Torpey	England	593	139	FW	1989–2008	19	7	
Brian Williams	England	593	51	MF	1971–1989	18	6	
Dennis Wise	England	593	95	MF	1984–2006	22	6	
Richard Wood	England	593	36	DF	2002–2025	23	8	
Ron Ashman	England	592	55	MF	1947–1964	17	1	
Kerry Dixon	England	592	231	FW	1980–1997	17	7	
Archie Gemmill	Scotland	592	54	MF	1967–1984	17	5	
Ryan Lowe	England	592	175	FW	2000–2018	18	8	
Jordan Rhodes	Scotland	592	220	FW	2007–2025	18	11	
Tony Adcock	England	591	212	FW	1980–1999	19	6	
Willie Donachie	Scotland	591	8	DF	1969–1991	22	4	
Emile Heskey	England	591	120	FW	1994–2016	22	6	
Steve Redmond	England	591	17	DF	1985–2003	18	3	
David Armstrong	England	590	120	MF	1971–1988	17	3	
Stanley Milburn	England	590	27	DF	1946–1965	19	3	
Dennis Mortimer	England	590	47	MF	1969–1987	18	5	
Carlton Palmer	England	590	32	MF	1985–2006	21	9	
Matt Elliott	England	588	71	DF	1988–2005	17	5	
Richard Jobson	England	588	40	DF	1982–2003	21	8	
**Garath McCleary**	Jamaica	588	73	FW	2007–	20	4	
Paul Allen	England	587	32	MF	1979–1998	19	8	
Mark Allott	England	587	52	MF	1996–2013	17	2	
Paul Bracewell	England	587	22	MF	1979–1999	20	5	
Bill McGarry	England	587	32	MF	1946–1963	17	3	
Wilfred Milne	England	587	7	DF	1920–1936	16	1	
Richard Shaw	England	587	4	DF	1987–2008	21	4	
Mitchell Thomas	England	587	15	DF	1982–2002	20	4	
John Barnes★	England	586	155	MF	1981–1999	18	4	
Russell Coughlin	Wales	586	41	MF	1978–1996	18	9	
Eddie Lowe	England	586	11	DF	1946–1965	19	3	
Peter Crouch	England	585	141	FW	2000–2019	19	8	
Martin Keown	England	585	8	DF	1985–2005	20	6	
Jim Langley	England	585	57	DF	1952–1967	15	4	
Tony Dunne	Republic of Ireland	584	2	DF	1960–1979	19	2	
Frank Lampard Sr.	England	584	19	DF	1967–1986	19	2	
Mick Harford	England	583	186	FW	1977–1998	21	10	
Bobby Robson★	England	583	133	FW	1950–1967	17	2	
Steve Whitworth	England	583	2	DF	1970–1985	15	4	
Nicky Adams	England	582	39	MF	2005–2022	17	10	
Stuart Boam	England	582	19	DF	1966–1983	17	4	
Les Bradd	England	582	182	FW	1967–1983	16	5	
Louis Carey	England	582	12	DF	1995–2014	19	2	
Troy Deeney	England	582	173	FW	2006–2024	18	4	
Craig Fleming	England	582	13	DF	1988–2007	19	5	
Sam Hardy	England	582	0	GK	1902–1925	23	4	
Peter Atherton	England	581	13	DF	1987–2005	18	5	
Ronnie Clayton	England	581	15	MF	1950–1969	19	1	
Paul Cook	England	581	55	MF	1984–2003	19	7	
Kenny Hibbitt	England	581	98	MF	1967–1989	22	4	
David Kelly	Republic of Ireland	581	186	FW	1983–2002	19	9	
Peter Noble	England	581	146	MF	1965–1983	18	4	
Peter Skipper	England	581	30	DF	1978–1994	16	7	
Ian Thomas-Moore	England	581	114	FW	1994–2011	17	9	
Ian Banks	England	580	87	DF	1978–1995	17	7	
Paul Furlong	England	580	185	FW	1991–2010	19	9	
Jim Magilton	Northern Ireland	580	64	MF	1990–2006	16	5	
Tommy Northcott	England	580	183	FW	1948–1966	18	3	
Kevin Phillips	England	580	246	FW	1994–2014	20	9	
**Nahki Wells**	Bermuda	580	167	FW	2010–	17	7	
Sam Bartram (Note: Sam Bartram made an additional three Football League appearances in 1939–40 before the season was abandoned. These are not included in his total)	England	579	0	GK	1934–1956	22	1	
Dave Hatton	England	579	17	DF	1961–1979	18	3	
Chris Sedgwick	England	579	35	MF	1997–2016	19	5	
Liam Sercombe	England	579	75	MF	2008–2024	16	4	
Robbie Blake	England	578	145	FW	1994–2013	19	8	
Tony Cottee	England	578	225	FW	1982–2001	19	7	
Robbie Earle★	Jamaica	578	136	MF	1982–2000	18	2	
Colin Methven	Scotland	578	35	DF	1979–1993	14	4	
Jimmy Quinn	Northern Ireland	578	210	FW	1981–2000	19	8	
Bob Taylor	England	577	200	FW	1985–2004	19	5	
Mark Wallington	England	577	0	GK	1971–1991	20	4	
Alan Hodgkinson	England	576	0	GK	1954–1971	17	1	
Ray Houghton	Republic of Ireland	576	68	MF	1981–1999	18	7	
Joe Jacobson	Wales	576	48	DF	2005–2024	19	6	
Andy Legg	Wales	576	61	DF	1988–2005	17	7	
Jimmy McIlroy★	Northern Ireland	576	133	FW	1950–1968	18	3	
Tony Norman	Wales	576	0	GK	1979–1997	18	3	
John Simpson	England	576	0	GK	1956–1972	16	2	
Dave Stringer	England	576	19	DF	1964–1981	17	2	
Ashley Young	England	576	66	DF	2003–2026	23	5	
Damien Delaney	Republic of Ireland	575	16	DF	2000–2018	18	8	
Shaun Derry	England	575	12	MF	1995–2014	19	8	
Simon Francis	England	575	9	DF	2002–2020	18	7	
Barry Horne	Wales	575	34	MF	1984–2001	17	9	
Andy Liddell	Scotland	575	136	FW	1991–2010	19	5	
Barry Roche	Republic of Ireland	575	1	GK	2000–2020	20	3	
Richard Cresswell	England	574	122	FW	1995–2014	19	8	
Ray McHale	England	574	85	MF	1971–1988	17	9	
Billy Rudd	England	574	69	MF	1959–1977	18	5	
Dean Saunders	Wales	574	170	FW	1983–2001	18	10	
John Connelly	England	573	181	FW	1956–1973	17	4	
Darren Currie	England	573	61	FW	1994–2011	17	12	
Bradley Johnson	England	573	75	MF	2004–2023	19	8	
Vince Overson	England	573	15	DF	1979–1998	19	4	
Tommy Rowe	England	573	78	MF	2006–2024	18	6	
Duncan Forbes	Scotland	572	13	DF	1961–1981	20	3	
Jussi Jaaskelainen	Finland	572	0	GK	1998–2017	19	3	
Gary Liddle	England	572	28	DF	2006–2022	16	6	
Don O'Riordan	Republic of Ireland	572	51	MF	1976–1996	20	10	
Alan Campbell	Scotland	571	43	MF	1965–1982	17	4	
Jim Cannon	Scotland	571	30	DF	1972–1988	16	1	
Warney Cresswell	England	571	1	DF	1919–1936	17	3	
Tony Grealish	Republic of Ireland	571	31	MF	1974–1992	18	7	
Jimmy Greenhoff	England	571	146	FW	1962–1984	22	7	
David Linighan	England	571	24	DF	1981–2000	19	5	
Jimmy Melia	England	571	105	MF	1955–1972	17	5	
Sean O'Driscoll	Republic of Ireland	571	32	MF	1979–1995	16	2	
James Perch	England	571	23	DF	2004–2023	19	6	
Jack Smith	England	571	147	FW	1919–1937	18	4	
Alex Stepney	England	571	2	GK	1963–1978	15	3	
Alan Curtis	Wales	570	116	MF	1972–1990	18	5	
Mal Donaghy	Northern Ireland	570	19	DF	1978–1994	16	3	
Peter Grummitt	England	570	0	GK	1960–1977	17	3	
Cliff Holton	England	570	293	FW	1950–1968	18	7	
Stuart Pearce★	England	570	72	DF	1983–2002	19	5	
Ian Rush★	Wales	570	246	FW	1978–1999	21	6	
Tommy Taylor	England	570	17	DF	1967–1982	15	3	
Anthony Grant	Jamaica	569	18	MF	2004–2024	20	13	
Mick Lyons	England	569	64	DF	1970–1987	17	3	
Stuart McCall	Scotland	569	53	MF	1982–2004	22	3	
Andy Ritchie	England	569	177	FW	1977–1999	22	5	
Jimmy Armfield★	England	568	6	DF	1954–1971	17	1	
Peter Dobing	England	568	201	FW	1956–1973	17	3	
John Humphrey	England	568	8	DF	1979–1998	19	6	
Frank Large	England	568	209	FW	1958–1974	16	9	
David O'Leary	Republic of Ireland	568	11	DF	1975–1994	19	2	
Bryan Robson★	England	568	115	MF	1974–1997	23	3	
Peter Fox	England	567	0	GK	1972–1997	25	4	
Paul Hart	England	567	39	DF	1970–1988	18	7	
Micah Hyde	England	567	39	MF	1993–2010	17	5	
Paddy Kenny	Republic of Ireland	567	0	GK	1999–2015	16	5	
Ray Mathias	England	567	6	DF	1967–1985	18	1	
Ian Miller	Scotland	567	40	MF	1973–1991	18	7	
Bill Foulkes	England	566	7	DF	1952–1970	18	1	
Glenn Morris	England	566	0	GK	2001–2026	25	5	
Dean Smith	England	566	54	DF	1988–2005	17	5	
Michael Brown	England	565	43	MF	1995–2017	22	9	
Rob Edwards	Wales	565	15	DF	1989–2011	22	5	
Tommy Eglington	Republic of Ireland	565	112	FW	1946–1961	15	2	
**Aden Flint**	England	565	58	DF	2010–	17	9	
Craig Short	England	565	30	DF	1987–2006	19	6	
John Butler	England	564	22	DF	1981–1997	16	2	
Kevin Dillon	England	564	64	MF	1977–1994	17	4	
Tony Hazell	England	564	10	DF	1964–1981	17	4	
Clint Hill	England	564	31	DF	1997–2018	21	7	
Joe Jakub	Scotland	564	36	MF	1975–1995	20	4	
Martin Ling	England	564	63	MF	1982–2000	18	6	
Keith Newton	England	564	15	DF	1960–1978	18	3	
Phil Turner	England	564	46	MF	1979–1996	17	4	
Dave Wagstaffe	England	564	42	MF	1960–1979	19	4	
Tim Williamson	England	564	2	GK	1901–1923	22	1	
Lukas Jutkiewicz	England	563	105	FW	2005–2025	20	9	
David Lowe	England	562	133	FW	1982–2000	18	5	
Steve Phillips	England	562	200	FW	1971–1988	17	9	
Ces Podd	Saint Kitts and Nevis	562	3	DF	1970–1988	18	3	
Bruce Rioch	Scotland	562	129	MF	1964–1984	20	7	
Mark Schwarzer	Australia	562	0	GK	1996–2015	19	5	
Charlie Aitken	Scotland	561	14	DF	1960–1976	16	1	
Gary Ford	England	561	74	MF	1978–1996	18	6	
Michael Johnson	Jamaica	561	19	DF	1991–2009	18	4	
Lee Nogan	Wales	561	114	FW	1987–2004	17	10	
Chris Price	England	561	43	DF	1976–1994	18	4	
Glenn Roeder	England	561	31	DF	1974–1993	19	6	
Peter Thompson	England	561	63	FW	1960–1978	18	3	
Dean Windass	England	561	178	FW	1991–2010	19	8	
Gary Alexander	England	560	156	FW	1999–2014	15	9	
Danny Graham	England	560	155	FW	2003–2021	18	12	
Martin Hicks	England	560	24	DF	1977–1993	16	2	
Mark Hughes★	Wales	560	153	FW	1983–2002	19	5	
Alan Knill	Wales	560	32	DF	1984–1999	15	6	
Jack Lester	England	560	146	FW	1994–2013	19	5	
Neil Sullivan	Scotland	560	0	GK	1990–2013	23	6	
Roy Bentley	England	559	175	FW	1946–1963	17	4	
Matt Phillips	Scotland	559	69	FW	2007–2026	19	7	
Alan Shearer★	England	559	283	FW	1987–2006	19	3	
Alf Sherwood	Wales	559	35	DF	1946–1961	15	2	
Trevor Sinclair	England	559	74	FW	1989–2008	19	5	
Ken Wagstaff	England	559	266	FW	1960–1976	16	2	
Bobby Woodruff	England	559	115	MF	1958–1976	18	5	
David Worrall	England	559	42	MF	2006–2026	20	9	
Alan Wright	England	559	8	DF	1987–2009	22	11	
Brian Flynn	Wales	558	35	MF	1973–1993	20	6	
Paul Green	Republic of Ireland	558	48	MF	2003–2020	17	7	
John McCue	England	558	2	DF	1946–1962	16	2	
**Sam Morsy**	Egypt	558	32	MF	2009–	18	8	
Kasper Schmeichel	Denmark	558	0	GK	2005–2022	17	8	
Dick Tydeman	England	558	22	MF	1969–1984	15	3	
John Brayford	England	557	28	DF	2008–2024	16	5	
Gary Briggs	England	557	22	DF	1977–1995	18	2	
Paul Cooper	England	557	0	GK	1971–1991	20	5	
Johnny Giles★	Republic of Ireland	557	101	MF	1959–1977	18	3	
Brian Godfrey	Wales	557	128	FW	1959–1976	17	6	
Tommy Burden	England	556	73	DF	1946–1961	15	3	
Neil McNab	Scotland	556	33	MF	1973–1994	21	8	
Darren Purse	England	556	34	DF	1993–2013	20	10	
Kevin Randall	England	556	181	FW	1965–1981	16	5	
Ken Beamish	England	555	159	FW	1965–1982	17	6	
Paul Ince	England	555	63	MF	1986–2007	21	7	
Peter Lorimer	Scotland	555	176	FW	1962–1986	24	2	
Maurice Owen	England	555	150	FW	1946–1963	17	1	
Dave Thompson	England	555	61	FW	1981–1997	16	5	
Bert Tindill	England	555	183	FW	1946–1962	16	3	
David Webb	England	555	35	DF	1964–1985	21	8	
Alan Williams	England	555	24	DF	1956–1972	16	5	
Luther Blissett	England	554	207	FW	1975–1994	19	5	
Guy Butters	England	554	35	DF	1988–2008	20	6	
Alan Durban	Wales	554	135	MF	1959–1978	19	3	
Matt Holland	Republic of Ireland	554	69	MF	1994–2009	15	3	
Mike Jackson	England	554	37	DF	1991–2009	18	6	
Paul McKenna	England	554	33	MF	1996–2013	17	4	
Simon Morgan	England	554	52	DF	1985–2002	17	3	
David Preece	England	554	30	MF	1980–2002	22	7	
Darren Ward	England	554	21	DF	1996–2017	21	9	
Danny Blanchflower★	Northern Ireland	553	27	DF	1948–1964	16	3	
Mike Edwards	England	553	34	DF	1997–2017	20	5	
Keith Oakes	England	553	48	DF	1972–1991	19	4	
Dennis Booth	England	552	19	DF	1966–1985	19	6	
Gary Breen	Republic of Ireland	552	13	DF	1991–2010	19	9	
Dannie Bulman	England	552	25	MF	1998–2021	23	4	
Lee Chapman	England	552	197	FW	1978–1996	18	12	
Shaun Goater	Bermuda	552	217	FW	1989–2006	17	7	
Harry Harris	Wales	552	107	FW	1954–1971	17	2	
Matt Lawrence	England	552	6	DF	1995–2012	17	5	
Paul Wotton	England	552	61	DF	1994–2014	20	4	
David Best	England	551	0	GK	1960–1976	16	4	
Ted Burgin	England	551	0	GK	1949–1966	17	4	
Jermain Defoe	England	551	191	FW	2000–2022	22	5	
Paul Gallagher	Scotland	551	90	MF	2002–2021	19	6	
Trevor Hebberd	England	551	56	MF	1976–1995	19	8	
David Oldfield	England	551	73	MF	1987–2004	17	7	
Matt Ritchie	Scotland	551	97	FW	2008–2026	18	7	
Craig Woodman	England	551	7	DF	2000–2020	20	6	
Ron Wylie	Scotland	551	54	FW	1951–1970	19	3	
Lee Camp	Northern Ireland	550	0	GK	2002–2021	19	10	
David Cross	England	550	194	FW	1969–1986	17	9	
Nicky Eaden	England	550	13	DF	1992–2007	15	5	
Fred Else	England	550	0	GK	1953–1970	17	3	
George Armstrong	England	549	53	MF	1961–1979	18	3	
Ian Atkins	England	549	75	MF	1975–1994	19	8	
Ron Davies	Wales	549	275	FW	1959–1976	17	7	
Paul Smith	England	549	34	MF	1989–2007	18	6	
Noel Blake	England	548	35	DF	1979–2001	22	8	
Bobby Doyle	Scotland	548	46	MF	1972–1987	15	5	
Andy Hessenthaler	England	548	34	MF	1991–2007	16	4	
Michael Nelson	England	548	33	DF	2000–2018	18	7	
Gary Owers	England	548	46	DF	1987–2002	15	3	
Alan Slough	England	548	51	MF	1965–1982	17	4	
Gordon Taylor	England	548	55	FW	1962–1980	18	4	
Dean Whitehead	England	548	26	MF	2000–2018	18	5	
Neil Cox	England	547	37	MF	1990–2008	18	7	
Gordon Jones	England	547	9	DF	1960–1975	15	2	
Sean McCarthy	Wales	547	171	FW	1985–2002	17	7	
Jimmy Phillips	England	547	18	DF	1983–2000	17	3	
Derek Dougan	Northern Ireland	546	222	FW	1957–1975	18	6	
Michael Duff	Northern Ireland	546	19	DF	1999–2016	17	2	
Gavin Peacock	England	546	107	MF	1986–2002	16	6	
Stuart Taylor	England	546	28	DF	1965–1980	15	1	
Jim Iley	England	545	31	MF	1954–1973	19	5	
Brian Lloyd	England	545	1	GK	1967–1983	16	5	
**Curtis Nelson**	England	545	25	DF	2010–	17	6	
Ray Parry	England	545	112	FW	1951–1972	21	3	
Kevin Ball	England	544	27	DF	1983–2002	19	4	
Steve Brown	England	544	57	MF	1983–2004	21	2	
Keith Edwards	England	544	254	FW	1975–1991	16	6	
Brian Harris	England	544	23	MF	1955–1974	19	3	
Andrew Hughes	England	544	39	MF	1995–2014	19	7	
Paul Konchesky	England	544	14	DF	1997–2017	20	9	
Kevin Richardson	England	544	37	MF	1981–2000	19	8	
Andy Thorpe	England	544	3	DF	1977–1998	21	3	
Emmerson Boyce	England	543	22	DF	1998–2016	18	4	
Deon Burton	Jamaica	543	125	FW	1993–2015	22	14	
Bruce Grobbelaar	Zimbabwe	543	1	GK	1979–1999	20	8	
Johnny King	England	543	174	FW	1950–1967	17	3	
Brett Pitman	Jersey	543	181	FW	2005–2022	17	6	
Steve Cherry	England	542	0	GK	1979–1999	20	9	
Fred Tunstall	England	542	169	FW	1920–1936	16	2	
Ian Wood	England	542	22	DF	1965–1981	16	2	
Gary Shelton	England	541	56	MF	1975–1998	23	8	
Paul Wilkinson	England	541	155	FW	1982–1999	17	10	
Ian Bishop	England	540	32	MF	1983–2003	20	7	
Kevin Kilbane	Republic of Ireland	540	37	MF	1995–2013	18	9	
Kenny Lunt	England	540	36	MF	1997–2012	15	3	
Paul McLaren	England	540	26	MF	1993–2012	19	6	
Stuart Naylor	England	540	0	GK	1981–2000	19	7	
Lawrie Sanchez	England	540	61	MF	1977–1994	17	3	
Gareth Ainsworth	England	539	107	MF	1991–2013	22	9	
**Aaron Cresswell**	England	539	21	DF	2008–	18	4	
Johnny Gordon	England	539	138	FW	1951–1967	16	2	
Chris Gunter	Wales	539	5	DF	2006–2023	17	6	
Jamie Hewitt	England	539	26	DF	1985–2002	17	2	
Jim McNab	Scotland	539	20	MF	1958–1976	18	3	
Dennis Rofe	England	539	11	DF	1967–1984	17	4	
**Jake Bidwell**	England	538	11	DF	2011–	15	4	
George Curtis	England	538	14	DF	1955–1972	17	2	
**Chris Wood**	New Zealand	538	178	FW	2008–	19	12	
Alan Woodward	England	538	158	MF	1964–1979	15	1	
Mark Aizlewood	Wales	537	23	DF	1975–1995	20	7	
Elliott Bennett	England	537	30	DF	2007–2024	17	7	
Kevin Bond	England	537	33	DF	1975–1994	19	5	
Chris Brunt	Northern Ireland	537	68	MF	2003–2021	18	3	
Paul Hayes	England	537	117	FW	2002–2018	16	10	
Graham Kavanagh	Republic of Ireland	537	75	MF	1992–2011	19	8	
Robbie Savage	Wales	537	37	MF	1994–2011	17	6	
**Michael Smith**	England	537	136	FW	2009–	18	13	
Alex Baptiste	England	536	25	DF	2002–2022	20	10	
David Bardsley	England	536	18	DF	1981–2000	19	4	
**Jordan Bowery**	England	536	73	DF	2008–	19	10	
Peter Farrell	Republic of Ireland	536	14	DF	1946–1960	14	2	
Mick Kennedy	Republic of Ireland	536	29	MF	1978–1994	16	10	
Alan Kimble	England	536	24	DF	1984–2003	19	6	
Paul Madeley	England	536	25	DF	1963–1981	18	1	
Kevin Nolan	England	536	99	FW	1999–2016	17	4	
Chris Porter	England	536	147	FW	2002–2022	20	8	
Gordon Armstrong	England	535	60	MF	1984–2003	19	5	
Jason Dozzell	England	535	79	MF	1983–2001	18	4	
Tommy Fowler	England	535	84	FW	1946–1963	17	2	
Adrian Heath	England	535	119	MF	1978–1997	19	6	
Pat Howard	England	535	18	DF	1965–1982	17	5	
Roger Joslyn	England	535	39	MF	1967–1982	15	4	
Ted MacDougall	Scotland	535	256	FW	1967–1981	14	7	
John McGovern	Scotland	535	27	MF	1965–1984	19	5	
Gary Pallister	England	535	18	FW	1985–2001	16	3	
Gareth Roberts	Wales	535	22	DF	1999–2014	15	5	
Charlie Wright	Scotland	535	0	GK	1958–1973	15	4	
Doug Clarke	England	534	115	FW	1953–1968	15	3	
Ian Evatt	England	534	23	DF	2000–2018	18	5	
Andy Farrell	England	534	32	DF	1983–1999	16	4	
Keith Houchen	England	534	151	FW	1977–1997	20	6	
Eddie May	England	534	46	DF	1964–1978	14	3	
Keith Peacock	England	534	92	MF	1962–1979	17	1	
Phil Burrows	England	533	18	DF	1966–1980	14	4	
Adam Chambers	England	533	12	DF	2000–2019	19	5	
Steve Chettle	England	533	14	DF	1987–2003	16	4	
Jack Cork	England	533	14	MF	2006–2024	18	7	
Martin Foyle	England	533	155	FW	1982–2000	18	4	
Dave Needham	England	533	44	DF	1965–1982	17	3	
**Richard Smallwood**	England	533	17	MF	2010–	17	8	
Andy Thompson	England	533	48	MF	1985–2003	18	5	
Kenny Clements	England	532	4	DF	1975–1991	16	4	
Toumani Diagouraga	France	532	22	MF	2005–2023	18	14	
Keith Dublin	England	532	16	DF	1983–1999	16	5	
John Marquis	England	532	147	FW	2009–2026	17	11	
Colin Woodthorpe	England	532	12	DF	1986–2008	22	4	
Chris Balderstone	England	531	91	MF	1959–1976	17	3	
Kenny Cunningham	Republic of Ireland	531	1	DF	1989–2007	18	4	
Efe Sodje	Nigeria	531	35	DF	1997–2013	16	9	
Andy Booth	England	530	162	FW	1991–2009	18	3	
Bob Crompton★	England	530	14	DF	1896–1920	24	1	
Dean Holdsworth	England	530	163	FW	1987–2006	19	10	
Bob Latchford	England	530	218	FW	1968–1986	18	6	
Nicky Law	England	530	26	DF	1981–1997	16	8	
Keith Millen	England	530	26	FW	1984–2003	19	3	
John Terry	England	530	42	DF	1998–2018	20	3	
Simon Barker	England	529	70	MF	1983–2000	17	3	
Ron Flowers	England	529	37	DF	1952–1969	17	2	
James Henry	England	529	96	FW	2008–2024	16	8	
Geoff Hurst★	England	529	212	FW	1959–1976	17	3	
Peter Reid	England	529	33	MF	1974–1995	21	7	
Dicky Robinson	England	529	1	DF	1946–1963	17	2	
Winston White	England	529	61	MF	1976–1993	17	13	
Mike Bailey	England	528	40	MF	1960–1979	19	3	
Adam Black	Scotland	528	4	DF	1919–1935	16	1	
Eric Brook (Note: Eric Brook made an additional three Football League appearances (scoring one goal) in 1939–40 before the season was abandoned. These are not included in his total)	England	528	176	FW	1925–1939	14	2	
Trevor Brooking★	England	528	88	MF	1967–1984	17	1	
Tony Currie	England	528	80	MF	1967–1985	18	5	
Karl Henry	England	528	11	MF	2001–2019	18	6	
Johnny McNichol	Scotland	528	111	FW	1948–1963	15	3	
Norman Piper	England	528	86	MF	1964–1978	14	2	
Len Weare	Wales	528	0	GK	1955–1970	15	1	
John Craggs	England	527	13	DF	1966–1985	19	3	
Andy Edwards	England	527	21	DF	1988–2006	18	4	
Michael Gray	England	527	22	DF	1992–2010	18	5	
Bobby Kellard	England	527	57	MF	1959–1976	17	8	
George Harrison	England	526	100	FW	1910–1932	22	4	
Arthur Kaye	England	526	103	FW	1950–1967	17	4	
Sam Collins	England	525	19	DF	1996–2015	19	6	
George Eastham	England	525	74	FW	1956–1974	18	3	
Kevin McHale	England	525	86	FW	1956–1972	16	3	
Lee Peltier	England	525	8	DF	2006–2024	18	10	
Scott Sellars	England	525	71	MF	1982–2003	21	6	
Michael Carrick	England	524	26	MF	1999–2018	19	5	
Joe Corrigan	England	524	0	GK	1967–1985	18	4	
Nick Fenton	England	524	27	DF	1998–2013	15	7	
Marcus Gayle	Jamaica	524	66	MF	1988–2006	18	4	
Billy Smith	England	524	115	FW	1913–1935	22	2	
Albert Sturgess	England	524	8	DF	1902–1925	23	3	
John Taylor	England	524	152	FW	1988–2004	16	8	
Bruce Bannister	England	523	167	FW	1965–1980	15	4	
Phil Boyer	England	523	159	FW	1968–1983	15	5	
**Sonny Bradley**	England	523	28	DF	2011–	16	9	
Karl Duguid	England	523	47	MF	1995–2014	19	2	
Jeff Eckhardt	England	523	48	DF	1984–2001	17	4	
Trevor Hockey	Wales	523	28	MF	1959–1976	17	7	
Chris Hope	England	523	32	DF	1993–2006	13	2	
Barry Kitchener	England	523	25	DF	1966–1982	16	1	
Nicky Marker	England	523	22	DF	1981–1999	18	4	
Bobby Marshall	England	523	139	FW	1920–1938	18	2	
Shane Nicholson	England	523	32	DF	1986–2007	21	8	
Craig Shakespeare	England	523	67	MF	1982–1998	16	5	
Jody Craddock	England	522	20	DF	1993–2013	20	5	
Jerry Dawson	England	522	0	GK	1906–1929	23	1	
Ken Furphy	England	522	10	DF	1953–1968	15	3	
Eddie Hopkinson	England	522	0	GK	1951–1970	19	2	
Glen Johnson	England	522	0	GK	1970–1983	13	3	
Dixie McNeil	England	522	239	FW	1966–1983	17	5	
Chris O'Grady	England	522	100	FW	2002–2020	18	17	
David Pugh	Wales	522	26	MF	1964–1981	17	5	
Gary Strodder	England	522	26	DF	1982–2001	19	6	
Ray Wilkins★	England	522	44	MF	1973–1997	24	7	
John Bramhall	England	521	35	DF	1976–1991	15	6	
Les Briley	England	521	28	MF	1976–1992	16	5	
Glenn Murray	England	521	191	FW	2005–2021	16	9	
Wayne Rooney	England	521	214	FW	2002–2021	19	3	
Jock Rutherford	England	521	103	FW	1901–1927	26	3	
Mark Venus	England	521	24	DF	1984–2004	20	5	
**Jed Wallace**	England	521	84	FW	2012–	15	5	
Paul Walsh	England	521	128	FW	1979–1996	17	7	
**Andreas Weimann**	Austria	521	96	FW	2010–	17	8	
Andy Davidson	England	520	18	DF	1952–1968	16	1	
Dougie Freedman	Scotland	520	161	FW	1994–2010	16	6	
Ian Hamilton	England	520	46	MF	1987–2002	15	7	
Martin Hodge	England	520	0	GK	1977–1995	18	9	
Gary Kelly	Republic of Ireland	520	0	GK	1986–2003	17	5	
Les Massie	Scotland	520	159	FW	1956–1971	15	5	
Tommy Miller	England	520	90	MF	1997–2015	18	8	
Eric Nixon	England	520	0	GK	1985–2004	19	10	
Micky Quinn	England	520	230	FW	1979–1995	16	8	
Wayne Routledge	England	520	48	FW	2001–2021	20	9	
Gareth Evans	England	519	87	FW	2007–2022	15	6	
David Hockaday	England	519	33	DF	1976–1995	19	5	
Doug Holden	England	519	53	FW	1951–1965	14	2	
**Tom Ince**	England	519	106	MF	2010–	17	12	
Jimmy McLaren	Scotland	519	0	GK	1922–1939	17	3	
Mel Pejic	England	519	17	DF	1979–1995	16	3	
Alex Revell	England	519	101	FW	2000–2020	20	12	
Joe Smith	England	519	315	FW	1908–1929	21	2	
Tommy Smith	England	519	95	FW	1997–2015	18	7	
David Speedie	Scotland	519	148	FW	1978–1994	16	11	
Trevor Storton	England	519	25	DF	1967–1984	17	3	
Allen Tankard	England	519	17	DF	1985–2002	17	4	
Tommy Allen	England	518	0	GK	1919–1934	15	5	
Mark Chamberlain	England	518	73	FW	1978–1997	19	7	
John Hendrie	Scotland	518	118	MF	1981–1999	18	7	
Peter Shirtliff	England	518	15	DF	1978–1998	20	5	
Les Taylor	England	518	32	MF	1974–1990	16	4	
Gary Bannister	England	517	172	FW	1978–1996	18	9	
Tony Ellis	England	517	179	FW	1986–2002	16	8	
John Hurst	England	517	31	DF	1965–1981	16	2	
Tony Ingham	England	517	3	DF	1947–1963	16	2	
Roy McFarland	England	517	45	DF	1966–1984	18	3	
Georgie Mee	England	517	50	FW	1920–1939	19	6	
Bert Murray	England	517	96	MF	1961–1976	15	4	
Shaun Taylor	England	517	53	DF	1986–2000	14	3	
Dave Evans	England	516	13	DF	1978–1992	14	3	
Jimmy Greaves★	England	516	357	FW	1957–1971	14	3	
Roy Greaves	England	516	66	MF	1965–1983	18	2	
Chris Lines	England	516	42	MF	2005–2022	17	6	
**Kyle Walker**	England	516	8	DF	2008–	19	7	
Tommy Craig	Scotland	515	81	MF	1968–1985	17	5	
Richard Dunne	Republic of Ireland	515	12	DF	1996–2015	19	4	
Jimmy Gabriel	Scotland	515	62	DF	1959–1974	15	5	
Don Goodman	England	515	151	FW	1983–2003	20	8	
Jack Howarth	England	515	190	FW	1964–1978	14	5	
Barry Swallow	England	515	39	DF	1960–1976	16	5	
Allan Clarke	England	514	223	FW	1963–1980	17	5	
Ken Coote	England	514	14	DF	1949–1964	15	1	
Rio Ferdinand★	England	514	11	DF	1995–2015	20	5	
Eric Gates	England	514	124	FW	1973–1991	18	3	
Ted Hemsley	England	514	30	MF	1960–1979	19	3	
Joe Laidlaw	England	514	118	MF	1967–1983	16	6	
Barry Murphy	England	514	3	DF	1962–1978	16	1	
Joe Garner	England	513	127	FW	2006–2026	20	10	
Matt Jackson	England	513	14	DF	1991–2008	17	10	
Grant Leadbitter	England	513	60	MF	2003–2021	18	4	
Paddy Madden	Republic of Ireland	513	157	FW	2010–2026	16	7	
Jason Pearce	England	513	21	DF	2007–2022	15	5	
Spencer Prior	England	513	13	DF	1988–2007	19	6	
Danis Salman	England	513	15	DF	1975–1993	18	5	
Ian Sharps	England	513	18	DF	1998–2015	17	4	
**Korey Smith**	England	513	8	MF	2008–	18	8	
Alfie Biggs	England	512	213	FW	1953–1969	16	4	
Neal Bishop	England	512	29	MF	2007–2020	13	5	
Nathan Clarke	England	512	13	DF	2001–2018	17	8	
Tony Gallimore	England	512	13	DF	1989–2006	17	5	
Glyn Hodges	Wales	512	87	MF	1980–1999	19	9	
Steve Mungall	Scotland	512	13	DF	1979–1996	17	1	
Eric Skeels	England	512	8	DF	1959–1977	18	2	
Matthew Spring	England	512	53	MF	1997–2014	17	7	
Jimmy Blain	England	511	62	DF	1959–1974	15	5	
John Bond	England	511	44	DF	1951–1969	18	2	
Baden Herod	England	511	3	DF	1921–1937	16	6	
Peter Hindley	England	511	11	DF	1962–1979	17	4	
Tommy Johnson	England	511	222	FW	1919–1936	17	3	
Paul Mariner	England	511	175	FW	1973–1988	15	4	
Johnny Newman	England	511	12	MF	1951–1972	21	4	
David Peach	England	511	72	DF	1969–1983	14	4	
Mel Sutton	England	511	27	MF	1968–1983	15	3	
Eric Winstanley	England	511	42	DF	1961–1977	16	2	
Gordon Banks★	England	510	0	GK	1958–1973	15	3	
Chris Barker	England	510	3	DF	1999–2013	14	7	
**Joe Edwards**	England	510	40	DF	2010–	17	5	
Fred Hill	England	510	87	MF	1957–1975	18	4	
Cliff Jones★	Wales	510	185	FW	1952–1970	18	3	
Brian Laws	England	510	31	DF	1979–1998	19	7	
Barry Lyons	England	510	72	FW	1963–1979	16	4	
Mark Morris	England	510	23	DF	1981–1998	17	7	
Lee Peacock	Scotland	510	122	FW	1993–2010	17	7	
Steve Phillips	England	510	0	GK	1998–2014	16	4	
Stuart Ripley	England	510	43	FW	1984–2001	17	6	
John Salako	England	510	49	MF	1986–2005	19	8	
Mark Smith	England	510	30	FW	1977–1994	17	4	
Eddie Stuart	South Africa	510	10	DF	1951–1968	17	4	
Clive Whitehead	England	510	23	DF	1973–1991	18	5	
Herbie Williams	Wales	510	102	FW	1958–1975	17	1	
Frank Womack	England	510	0	DF	1908–1930	22	2	
Frank Barton	England	509	82	MF	1964–1979	15	6	
Lee Bradbury	England	509	92	FW	1995–2011	16	11	
Simon Charlton	England	509	6	DF	1989–2007	18	6	
Andrew Cole	England	509	230	FW	1990–2009	19	13	
Andy Dawson	England	509	16	DF	1998–2015	17	2	
Steve Jenkins	Wales	509	7	DF	1990–2006	16	7	
Keith Jones	England	509	37	MF	1982–2002	20	5	
Shane Long	Republic of Ireland	509	98	FW	2005–2023	18	5	
Peter O'Sullivan	Wales	509	40	MF	1970–1984	14	5	
Albert Phelan	England	509	18	MF	1964–1977	13	2	
Pat Rice	Northern Ireland	509	13	DF	1967–1984	17	2	
Jackie Sewell	England	509	228	FW	1946–1961	15	4	
Trevor Tainton	England	509	25	MF	1967–1982	15	2	
Tug Wilson	England	509	68	FW	1922–1936	14	1	
Peter Withe	England	509	160	FW	1970–1990	20	9	
Barry Ashby	England	508	14	DF	1989–2005	16	3	
**Ashley Barnes**	England	508	106	FW	2008–	18	5	
Jamie Carragher	England	508	3	DF	1996–2013	17	1	
Billy Houghton	England	508	16	DF	1957–1974	17	5	
**Kyle McFadzean**	England	508	24	DF	2011–	16	6	
Steve McMahon	England	508	48	MF	1980–1998	18	5	
Jimmy Oakes (Note: Jimmy Oakes made an additional two Football League appearances in 1939–40 before the season was abandoned. These are not included in his total)	England	508	3	DF	1923–1939	16	2	
Peter Springett	England	508	0	GK	1962–1980	18	3	
Bert Trautmann★	West Germany	508	0	GK	1949–1964	15	1	
Terry Venables★	England	508	50	MF	1959–1975	16	4	
Steve Yates	England	508	10	DF	1986–2005	19	5	
Stan Bowles	England	507	127	MF	1967–1984	17	8	
Richard Carpenter	England	507	32	MF	1990–2007	17	4	
Steve Kember	England	507	55	MF	1965–1980	15	3	
James McClean	Republic of Ireland	507	51	MF	2011–2026	15	5	
Steve Palmer	England	507	20	DF	1989–2006	17	4	
Phil Parkinson	England	507	25	MF	1987–2003	16	2	
Jimmy Ruffell	England	507	160	FW	1921–1939	18	2	
Peter Whittingham	England	507	86	MF	2002–2018	16	5	
Lee Williamson	Jamaica	507	36	MF	1999–2017	18	9	
Joe Wilson	England	507	10	DF	1955–1973	18	4	
Clint Boulton	England	506	45	DF	1964–1979	15	2	
Frank Clark	England	506	1	DF	1963–1979	16	2	
Fraser Digby	England	506	0	GK	1986–2003	17	4	
Gerry Forrest	England	506	7	DF	1977–1991	14	2	
Billy Gray	England	506	73	FW	1947–1965	18	5	
Marlon Harewood	England	506	127	FW	1997–2015	18	10	
Charlie Hurley	Republic of Ireland	506	28	DF	1953–1971	18	3	
Luke Joyce	England	506	14	MF	2006–2021	15	5	
Alan Kennedy	England	506	26	DF	1972–1991	19	6	
Mark Proctor	England	506	47	MF	1978–1997	19	6	
David Wetherall	England	506	30	DF	1991–2008	17	2	
Gary Bennett	England	505	168	FW	1984–1999	15	6	
Norman Bullock	England	505	123	FW	1920–1935	15	1	
Terry Cooper	England	505	9	DF	1963–1985	22	5	
Tony Dorigo	Australia	505	18	DF	1983–2001	18	5	
Jonathan Douglas	Republic of Ireland	505	36	MF	2000–2017	17	8	
Mike England	Wales	505	36	DF	1959–1976	17	3	
Phil Neville	England	505	9	DF	1994–2013	19	2	
Mike Pollitt	England	505	0	GK	1992–2014	22	12	
Jason Shackell	England	505	19	DF	2002–2020	18	8	
Frank Sinclair	Jamaica	505	12	DF	1990–2009	19	7	
Lee Sinnott	England	505	12	DF	1981–1999	18	6	
Paul Stewart	England	505	124	FW	1981–1998	17	9	
Tony Adams★	England	504	32	DF	1983–2002	19	1	
Stan Anderson	England	504	46	MF	1952–1966	14	3	
Len Badger	England	504	7	DF	1962–1978	16	2	
Stuart Beavon	England	504	58	MF	1978–1993	15	4	
Sol Campbell	England	504	20	DF	1992–2011	19	5	
Alan Cork	England	504	155	FW	1977–1995	18	4	
Rory Delap	Republic of Ireland	504	33	DF	1992–2014	22	7	
Brian Drysdale	England	504	5	DF	1959–1978	19	5	
David Edwards	Wales	504	62	MF	2002–2021	19	4	
Mickey Evans	Republic of Ireland	504	87	FW	1990–2007	17	6	
Tim Flowers	England	504	0	GK	1984–2002	18	7	
Steven Gerrard★	England	504	120	MF	1998–2015	17	1	
Steve Harper	England	504	54	MF	1987–2002	15	7	
Conor Hourihane	Republic of Ireland	504	85	MF	2011–2025	14	6	
John Byrne	Republic of Ireland	503	134	FW	1979–1996	17	6	
Neil Danns	Guyana	503	71	MF	2002–2020	18	12	
Paul Devlin	Scotland	503	88	MF	1991–2006	15	6	
Matt Done	England	503	46	FW	2005–2022	17	6	
Chris Fairclough	England	503	36	DF	1982–2000	18	6	
Alf Jones	England	503	5	DF	1923–1936	13	1	
George Jones	England	503	164	FW	1961–1978	17	5	
Alan McLoughlin	Republic of Ireland	503	80	MF	1986–2002	16	6	
Tommy Smith	England	503	38	DF	1962–1979	17	2	
Gareth Southgate	England	503	26	DF	1990–2006	16	3	
Alan Suddick	England	503	109	FW	1961–1978	17	5	
Tom Brittleton	England	502	45	MF	1902–1925	23	3	
Malcolm Brown	England	502	21	DF	1973–1992	19	5	
Steve Davis	England	502	64	DF	1989–2004	15	5	
**Will Grigg**	Northern Ireland	502	141	FW	2008–	19	7	
David Marshall	Scotland	502	0	GK	2005–2022	17	6	
**Liam Palmer**	Scotland	502	11	DF	2010–	17	2	
Maik Taylor	Northern Ireland	502	0	GK	1995–2013	18	5	
George Burley	Scotland	501	8	DF	1973–1995	22	4	
Billy Pease	England	501	152	FW	1920–1934	14	3	
Neil Pointon	England	501	12	DF	1981–2000	19	6	
Nathan Tyson	England	501	111	FW	1999–2019	20	11	
Steve Walsh	England	501	57	DF	1982–2003	21	4	
Andrew Wilson	Scotland	501	199	FW	1900–1920	20	1	
Chris Billy	England	500	25	MF	1991–2007	16	5	
Steve Bould	England	500	11	DF	1981–2001	20	4	
George Boyd	Scotland	500	86	MF	2006–2021	15	6	
Tony Coton	England	500	0	GK	1980–1997	17	4	
Bobby Crawford	Scotland	500	23	MF	1921–1938	17	4	
David Currie	England	500	132	FW	1981–1997	16	9	
Jimmy Giles	England	500	20	DF	1965–1981	16	4	
**Matt Grimes**	England	500	23	MF	2013–	14	6	
Bill Harris	Wales	500	76	FW	1949–1966	17	3	
Mark Hooper (Note: Mark Hooper made an additional three Football League appearances (scoring one goal) in 1939–40 before the season was abandoned. These are not included in his total)	England	500	168	FW	1923–1939	16	2	
Mark Hughes	England	500	23	DF	2005–2022	17	9	
Kenny Irons	England	500	65	MF	1989–2003	14	2	
Kevin Keegan★	England	500	171	FW	1968–1984	16	4	
Kevin Keen	England	500	40	MF	1986–2002	16	4	
Francis Lee★	England	500	228	FW	1960–1976	16	3	
Joleon Lescott	England	500	36	DF	2000–2017	17	6	
Danny Mayor	England	500	40	MF	2008–2025	17	7	
Roy McDonough	England	500	96	FW	1976–1994	18	6	
Keith McPherson	England	500	18	DF	1984–2000	16	5	
Don Rogers	England	500	181	FW	1962–1977	15	3	
Russ Wilcox	England	500	27	DF	1980–2002	22	5	

== See also ==
- List of footballers with 500 or more Premier League appearances
- List of footballers in Scotland by number of league appearances
- List of footballers in Scotland by number of league goals
- List of footballers in England by number of league goals
