= Tommy Spencer =

Scottish footballer

Personal information
- Full name: Thomas Hannah Spencer
- Date of birth: 28 November 1945 (age 80)
- Place of birth: Glasgow, Scotland
- Positions: Striker; central defender

Senior career*
Years	Team	Apps	(Gls)
	Neilston	?	(?)
	Celtic	0	(0)
1965–1966	Southampton	3	(0)
1966–1968	York City	57	(21)
1968–1972	Workington	167	(10)
1972–1974	Lincoln City	74	(10)
1974–1978	Rotherham United	138	(10)
- * Club domestic league appearances and goals

Thomas Hannah Spencer (born 28 November 1945 in Glasgow, Scotland) is a Scottish former footballer.

== Career ==
Spencer played for Neilston, before joining Celtic in 1963. He joined Southampton in July 1965, after making no league appearances for Celtic. He joined York City in June 1966, after making three league appearances for Southampton. He was York's top scorer for the 1966–67 season, after scoring 23 goals. After making 65 appearances and scoring 26 goals for York, he joined Workington in March 1963 in a player-exchange deal, which brought Tommy Spratt to York. He made 167 appearances, mostly as a central defender, and scored 10 goals in the league for Workington, before joining Lincoln City in January 1972. He joined Rotherham United in July 1974, after making 74 appearances and scoring 10 goals in the league for Lincoln. He made 138 appearances and scored 10 goals in the league for Rotherham.
