= David Hancock =

David or Dave Hancock may refer to:

- Sir David Hancock (civil servant) (1934–2013), British civil servant
- Dave Hancock (footballer) (1938–2007), English footballer
- David Hancock (cricketer) (born 1940), English cricketer
- Dave Hancock (American politician) (born 1945), member of the Minnesota House of Representatives
- Dave Hancock (weightlifter) (1945–1993), English weightlifter
- Dave Hancock (born 1955), Canadian politician and judge, former premier of Alberta
- W. David Hancock, American playwright
