= Alan Morton (footballer, born 1942) =

English footballer

Personal information
- Full name: Alan Morton
- Date of birth: 6 March 1942
- Place of birth: Peterborough, England
- Date of death: 14 September 2021 (aged 79)
- Place of death: Lincoln, England
- Position: Inside forward

Youth career
- Arsenal

Senior career*
Years	Team	Apps	(Gls)
1961–1963	Peterborough United	7	(2)
1963–1965	Lincoln City	58	(20)
1965–1966	Chesterfield	29	(6)
–	Wisbech Town		
- * Club domestic league appearances and goals

Alan Morton (6 March 1942 – 14 September 2021) is an English former professional footballer who scored 28 goals from 94 appearances in the Football League playing as an inside forward for Peterborough United, Lincoln City and Chesterfield.

== Football career ==
Morton was born in Peterborough. He began his football career with Arsenal, but never played for the first team, and made his debut in the 1961–62 Football League season with Peterborough United. In 1963 he moved on to Lincoln City, where he was the club's top scorer in the 1963–64 season with 21 goals in all competitions. He played only infrequently the following season, and moved on to Chesterfield where he finished his professional career, later playing non-League football for Wisbech Town.

== Personal life ==
Morton died on 14 September 2021 in Lincoln at the age of 79.
