= Sammy Taylor (footballer, born 1933) =

Scottish footballer

Personal information
- Full name: Samuel McGregor Taylor
- Date of birth: 23 September 1933
- Place of birth: Glasgow, Scotland
- Date of death: 6 November 2013 (aged 80)
- Place of death: Preston, England
- Position: Winger

Senior career*
Years	Team	Apps	(Gls)
- Dunipace
1954–1955	Falkirk	24	(2)
1955–1961	Preston North End	149	(40)
1961–1964	Carlisle United	93	(12)
1964–1965	Southport	36	(3)
- Morecambe
Total		302	(58)

International career
1955	Scotland B vs A trial	1	(0)
- * Club domestic league appearances and goals

Samuel McGregor Taylor (23 September 1933 – 6 November 2013) was a Scottish professional footballer who played as a winger

== Career ==
Born in Glasgow, Taylor played for Dunipace, Falkirk, Preston North End, Carlisle United, Southport and Morecambe.

== Later life and death ==
Taylor died on 6 November 2013 at the age of 80.
