= Chris Riley (Welsh footballer) =

Welsh soccer player (1939–1983)

Personal information
- Full name: Christopher John Riley
- Date of birth: 19 January 1939
- Place of birth: Rhyl, Wales
- Date of death: 1983 (aged 43–44)
- Position: Forward

Senior career*
Years	Team	Apps	(Gls)
????–1958	Rhyl		
1958–1964	Crewe Alexandra	136	(46)
1964–1965	Witton Albion		
1965–1966	Ellesmere Port Town		
1966–????	Bedford Town		
- * Club domestic league appearances and goals

Christopher John Riley (19 January 1939 – 1983) was a Welsh professional footballer who played as a forward for Crewe Alexandra in the late 1950s and early 1960s.

Signed from Rhyl in March 1958, aged 19, he made his debut and scored his first goal for Crewe in a 3–1 defeat at Bradford Park Avenue on 15 March 1958. He played 155 league and cup matches for Crewe, scoring 49 goals, before moving, after an unsuccessful trial at Tranmere Rovers, to Witton Albion in 1964.

From Witton Albion, he then moved to Ellesmere Port Town and Bedford Town. He played while also a serving RAF officer, captaining the RAF football XI, and also played Minor Counties cricket for Flintshire and Denbighshire.
