= Ernie Ackerley =

English footballer

Personal information
- Full name: Ernest Nicol Ackerley
- Date of birth: 23 September 1943
- Place of birth: Dunfermline, Scotland
- Date of death: 1 June 2017 (aged 73)
- Position: Forward

Youth career
- 1960–1961: Manchester United

Senior career*
Years	Team	Apps	(Gls)
1961–1963	Manchester United	0	(0)
1963–1964	Barrow	53	(12)
1966–1972	South Melbourne	?	(?)
- * Club domestic league appearances and goals

Ernest Nicol Ackerley (23 September 1943 – 1 June 2017) was a professional footballer who played in the Football League as a forward. He was born in Scotland and grew up in Manchester.
