= Bill Hopper (footballer) =

English footballer (1938–2023)

Personal information
- Full name: William Hopper
- Date of birth: 20 February 1938
- Place of birth: Bishop Auckland, England
- Date of death: 7 April 2023 (aged 85)
- Place of death: Wirral, England
- Position: Centre forward

Senior career*
Years	Team	Apps	(Gls)
–	Bishop Auckland		
1960	Crook Town		
1960–1961	West Auckland Town		
1961–1963	Halifax Town	35	(9)
1963–1965	Workington	46	(14)
1965–1966	Darlington	6	(0)
1966–1967	South Shields		
1967–19??	Stockton		
- * Club domestic league appearances and goals

William Hopper (20 February 1938 – 7 April 2023) was an English footballer who played as a centre forward in the Football League for Halifax Town, Workington and Darlington, and in non-league football for several clubs in the north-east of England.

== Life and career ==
Hopper was born in Bishop Auckland, County Durham, and began his football career with his hometown club. He moved on to Crook Town and then West Auckland Town – scoring five goals on his debut for each club, against Stanley United on each occasion, and in his last match for West Auckland, a Northern League club, scoring the equaliser as they came back from three goals behind to draw with Barnsley of the Football League Third Division in the 1960–61 FA Cup.

In 1961, he signed as a full-time professional with Halifax Town, two years later moved on to Workington, and finished his Football League career with six league appearances for Darlington as they were promoted from the Fourth Division in 1965–66. Hopper scored one of the goals as Darlington eliminated First Division club Blackpool, whose team contained four England internationals, from that season's League Cup. Knee cartilage problems meant he then dropped back into non-league football with South Shields and Stockton.

Before turning professional, he had worked as a steam locomotive fireman, and afterwards worked for engineering company GEC.

Hopper died on 7 April 2023, at the age of 86.
