= Dudley Price =

Welsh footballer (1931–2021)

Personal information
- Date of birth: 17 November 1931
- Place of birth: Swansea, Wales
- Date of death: 2021 (aged 89)
- Place of death: Swansea, Wales
- Position: Inside forward

Youth career
- 1950–1954: Swansea Town

Senior career*
Years	Team	Apps	(Gls)
1954–1958	Swansea Town	33	(9)
1958–1960	Southend United	91	(41)
1960–1963	Hull City	76	(26)
1963–1965	Bradford City	62	(21)
- Merthyr Tydfil
Total		262	(97)
- * Club domestic league appearances and goals

Thomas Dudley Price (17 November 1931 – 2021), also known as Duggie Price, was a Welsh professional footballer who played as an inside forward.

== Career ==
Price began his career with hometown club Swansea Town, and also played in the English Football League for Southend United, Hull City and Bradford City.

He later played in the English non-League system for Welsh club Merthyr Tydfil.

== Personal life and death ==
Price was born in Swansea on 17 November 1931. He died in Swansea in 2021, at the age of 89.
