= Tommy Dixon (footballer, born 1929) =

English footballer

Personal information
- Date of birth: 8 June 1929
- Place of birth: Newcastle upon Tyne, England
- Date of death: 6 February 2014 (aged 84)
- Place of death: Watford, Hertfordshire
- Position: Forward

Youth career
- Newcastle United

Senior career*
Years	Team	Apps	(Gls)
1952–1954	West Ham United	39	(21)
1955–1959	Reading	123	(64)
1959–1960	Brighton & Hove Albion	35	(12)
1960–1962	Workington	53	(17)
1962–1964	Barrow	62	(23)
- * Club domestic league appearances and goals

Tommy Dixon (8 June 1929 – 6 February 2014) was an English footballer who played as a centre forward.

== Club career ==
Dixon played for West Ham United between 1952 and 1955. He was the club's top scorer during the 1953-54 season with a record of 19 goals, but only featured four times the following season. He moved to Reading, then transferred to the Third Division South, and was their top scorer two years running. He later played for Brighton & Hove Albion, Workington and Barrow.
