= Trevor Porteous =

English footballer and manager

Personal information
- Date of birth: 9 October 1933
- Place of birth: Hull, England
- Date of death: 15 May 1997 (aged 63)
- Place of death: Stockport, England
- Position: Wing half

Youth career
- Hull City

Senior career*
Years	Team	Apps	(Gls)
1951–1956	Hull City	61	(1)
1956–1965	Stockport County	337	(9)
Total		398	(10)

Managerial career
- 1963–1965: Stockport County
- * Club domestic league appearances and goals

Trevor Porteous (9 October 1933 – 15 May 1997) was an English football player and coach.

== Career ==
Born in Hull, Porteous played for Hull City and Stockport County. He was also player-manager of Stockport between 1963 and 1965.
