= Geoff Martin (English footballer) =

English footballer (1940–2021)

Personal information
- Full name: Geoffrey Martin
- Date of birth: 9 March 1940
- Place of birth: New Tupton, Derbyshire, England
- Date of death: 6 November 2021 (aged 81)
- Height: 5 ft 9 in (1.75 m)
- Position: Left winger

Senior career*
Years	Team	Apps	(Gls)
–	Parkhouse Colliery		
1958–1960	Chesterfield	2	(0)
1960–1961	Leeds United	1	(0)
1961–1962	Darlington	20	(6)
1962	Carlisle United	15	(2)
1962–1966	Workington	144	(24)
1966–1968	Grimsby Town	71	(5)
1968–1970	Chesterfield	43	(4)
- * Club domestic league appearances and goals

Geoffrey Martin (9 March 1940 – 6 November 2021) was an English footballer who scored 41 goals from 295 appearances in the Football League playing as a left winger for Chesterfield (in two spells), Darlington, Carlisle United, Workington and Grimsby Town. He was on the books of Leeds United, but his only appearance was in the League Cup. He won the Fourth Division championship with Chesterfield in the 1969–70 season, after which he retired.

According to a profile in the Workington Times & Star, "Martin was not the most skilful of wingers, but ideal in a 4–4–2 format. His work-rate was phenomenal, so strong and persistent."

Martin died on 6 November 2021, at the age of 81.
