= Colin Whitaker =

English footballer

Personal information
- Date of birth: 14 June 1932
- Place of birth: Leeds, England
- Date of death: 1 May 2015 (aged 82)
- Place of death: England
- Position: Left winger

Youth career
- Leeds United

Senior career*
Years	Team	Apps	(Gls)
1951–1952	Sheffield Wednesday	1	(0)
1953–1956	Bradford Park Avenue	49	(10)
1956–1960	Shrewsbury Town	152	(59)
1960–1961	Queens Park Rangers	8	(0)
1961–1962	Rochdale	54	(11)
1962–1964	Oldham Athletic	72	(29)
1964	Barrow	12	(0)
1964–	Ashton United		
–1966	Buxton		
- Heanor Town
- Stalybridge Celtic
Total		348	(109)

Managerial career
- Stalybridge Celtic
- 1970–1974: Buxton
- Droylsden
- 1978–1982: Buxton
- * Club domestic league appearances and goals

Colin Whitaker (14 July 1932 – 1 May 2015) was an English footballer who played as a left winger in the Football League.

== Football career ==
Whitaker was a member of the youth team at Leeds United, before joining Sheffield Wednesday during the 1951–52 season. After only one league appearance for Wednesday he signed for Bradford Park Avenue. He went on to play for five other Football League clubs, Shrewsbury Town, Queens Park Rangers, Rochdale, Oldham Athletic and Barrow.

In 1964 he dropped into non-League football, signing for Ashton United. He joined Buxton during the 1965–66 season, and also played for Heanor Town and Stalybridge Celtic, where he was player-manager. He later managed Buxton for two spells between December 1970 and January 1982, in between which he managed Droylsden.

== Other sports ==
He also played cricket for Shropshire in the 1958 Minor Counties Championship.

== Personal life ==
While playing for Rochdale and Oldham, Whitaker worked as sports master at Rochdale High School. He later ran a building business from which he retired at age 59, living between Ashton-under-Lyne and the Costa del Sol in Spain. He died on 1 May 2015 and was cremated at Oldham Crematorium.

== Honours ==
Rochdale

- Football League Cup runner-up: 1961–62
