= Ron Roberts (footballer) =

Welsh footballer (1942–2026)

Personal information
- Date of birth: 14 September 1942
- Place of birth: Wrexham, Wales
- Date of death: 13 March 2026 (aged 83)
- Place of death: Wrexham, Wales
- Position: Winger

Senior career*
Years	Team	Apps	(Gls)
1959–1962	Wrexham	67	(4)
1962–1964	Tranmere Rovers	56	(2)
- Stafford Rangers
Total		123	(6)
- * Club domestic league appearances and goals

Ron Roberts (14 September 1942 – 13 March 2026) was a Welsh footballer who played as a winger in the Football League for Wrexham and Tranmere Rovers. He died in Wrexham on 13 March 2026, at the age of 83.
