= Archie Taylor (footballer, born 1939) =

English footballer

Personal information
- Full name: Arthur Matson Taylor
- Date of birth: 7 November 1939 (age 86)
- Place of birth: Dunscroft, England
- Height: 5 ft 9 in (1.75 m)
- Position: Winger

Senior career*
Years	Team	Apps	(Gls)
	Doncaster Rovers	0	(0)
1958–1961	Bristol City	12	(2)
1961–1962	Barnsley	2	(0)
1962–1963	Hull City	1	(0)
1963–1967	Halifax Town	174	(16)
1967–1968	Bradford City	11	(0)
1968–1971	York City	96	(8)
- * Club domestic league appearances and goals

Arthur Matson "Archie" Taylor (born 7 November 1939) is an English former footballer.

== Career ==
Taylor started his career with Doncaster Rovers as an amateur.
