= Rodney Green (footballer) =

English footballer

Personal information
- Full name: Harry Rodney Green
- Date of birth: 24 June 1939
- Place of birth: Halifax, England
- Date of death: 21 November 2018 (aged 79)
- Position: Centre forward

Senior career*
Years	Team	Apps	(Gls)
1960–1962	Halifax Town	9	(2)
1962	Bradford (Park Avenue)	19	(6)
1962–1964	Bradford City	66	(39)
1964–1965	Gillingham	33	(17)
1965–1966	Grimsby Town	65	(20)
1966–1967	Charlton Athletic	4	(1)
1967–1968	Luton Town	11	(3)
1968–1970	Watford	30	(8)
–	Durban United		
- * Club domestic league appearances and goals

Harry Rodney Green (24 June 1939 – 21 November 2018), known as Rodney Green, was an English footballer, born in Halifax, West Yorkshire, who played in the Football League as a centre forward for Halifax Town, Bradford (Park Avenue), Bradford City, Gillingham, Grimsby Town, Charlton Athletic, Luton Town and Watford.

Green started his career with his hometown club Halifax Town before playing for the two Bradford league sides, first Bradford (Park Avenue) then Bradford City. In his second full season, 1963–64, he was City's top goal-scorer, with 29 league goals and two League Cup goals including two hat-tricks.

He left City with 39 league goals from 66 games, to join Gillingham where his 17 goals came in 33 games, then Grimsby Town, scoring 20 league goals in 65 games. His career continued at Charlton Athletic, Luton Town and Watford before he moved to South Africa.

Green played for Durban United in South Africa before returning to Halifax to run an antiques shop and a furniture import business.
