= Franklin Twist =

English footballer

Personal information
- Date of birth: 2 November 1940
- Place of birth: Liverpool, England
- Date of death: 7 December 2024 (aged 84)
- Position: Winger

Youth career
- Liverpool
- Prescot Cables

Senior career*
Years	Team	Apps	(Gls)
1961–1963	Bury	8	(0)
1963–1965	Halifax Town	64	(11)
1965–1966	Tranmere Rovers	7	(3)
1966-1967	New Brighton		
1967-1968	Altrincham	41	(4)
Total		79	(14)
- * Club domestic league appearances and goals

Franklin Twist (2 November 1940 – 7 December 2024) was an English former footballer, who played as a winger in the Football League for Bury and Tranmere Rovers.

He died in December 2024 due to an intracranial hemorrhage.

== Early life ==
Twist was educated at Roscoe Secondary Modern School.

== Career ==
=== Youth ===
Twist began his career as a junior with Liverpool. After playing "several outstanding games" for his school which brought him prominence in the 1955 season, he made his debut for the Liverpool senior youth team in the sixth round of the English trophy. Liverpool played Swansea F.C. at Anfield, in what was considered among the most difficult debuts for a youth player, as Swansea had a record five international players. He helped his side go on to win the game 7-0 and kept his place in the team, ultimately winning a medal when Liverpool beat Brighton in the final 7-2. He was praised for his quick speed and ball control.

=== Senior ===
Following his release from Liverpool, he signed for Prescot Cables while training as an electrician. While at the club, he was described as being a crowd favourite and his performances attracted interest from scouts representing Bury and Oldham. He joined Bury in October 1961 for a fee described as being "fairly substantial", making his debut against Walsall.

In 1963, he signed for Halifax Town, becoming one of four former Liverpool players then playing for the club. In July 1965, Twist joined Tranmere Rovers, where he made 7 league appearances, scoring 1 goal, along with an appearance in the League Cup.

During a spell with New Brighton, Twist was placed on the open-to-transfer list following the club's financial difficulties and agreed to accept a temporary reduction in wages to help the club. He later joined Altrincham in 1967 and made his debut against Chester City, going on to make 60 appearances for the club, scoring 5 goals. During his time at Altrincham, the club won the Northwest Floodlit League and the Cheshire County League, the Cheshire Senior Cup. Twist left the club at the end of the season, rounding off his career with a return spell at New Brighton and later Radcliffe Borough.

=== International ===
His first international youth game was against Yugoslavia youth in 1958, where he played as an outside right. During a game against Romania in April 1958, where he was described as having given his "finest performance", his run contributed towards an England goal in which they won 1-0. In May 1958, during a youth international game against Switzerland, Twist scored in a 3-0 win.
