= Ken McDowall =

English footballer

Personal information
- Full name: Kenneth Francis McDowall
- Date of birth: 6 May 1938 (age 88)
- Place of birth: Manchester, England
- Position: Outside left

Senior career*
Years	Team	Apps	(Gls)
1958–1959	Rhyl	?	(?)
1959–1960	Manchester United	0	(0)
1960–1961	Rochdale	6	(0)
1961–19??	Rhyl		
- * Club domestic league appearances and goals

Kenneth Francis McDowall (born 6 May 1938) is an English former footballer who played as an outside left in the Football League Fourth Division for Rochdale in the early 1960s. He began his career in the Cheshire League with Rhyl before joining Manchester United in September 1959. A year later, in October 1960, he left Manchester United for Rochdale without making an appearance.
