= Willie Devine =

Scottish footballer

Personal information
- Full name: William Devine
- Date of birth: 22 August 1933
- Place of birth: Ayr, Scotland
- Date of death: 16 April 1997 (aged 63)
- Place of death: Stevenston, North Ayrshire, Scotland
- Position: Left wing

Senior career*
Years	Team	Apps	(Gls)
1955–1958	St Mirren	36	(7)
1958–1959	Watford	30	(6)
1959–1960	Partick Thistle	14	(2)
1960–1962	Accrington Stanley	46	(6)
1962–1963	Cambridge City	44	(6)
1963-1964	Cambridge United	34	(12)
Total		204	(39)
- * Club domestic league appearances and goals

William Devine (22 August 1933 – 16 April 1997) was a Scottish professional footballer who played as a left winger in the Scottish League and the English Football League. Following Accrington Stanley's resignation from the Football League in March 1962 he immediately joined Cambridge City. Devine was an integral part of the City team that won the Southern League in the 1962-1963 season. He was born in Ayr.
