= Jimmy Blain =

English footballer

Personal information
- Full name: James Donald Blain
- Date of birth: 9 April 1940 (age 86)
- Place of birth: Mossley Hill, Liverpool, England
- Height: 5 ft 8 1/2 in (1.74 m)
- Positions: Left back; inside forward

Youth career
- 195?–1959: Everton

Senior career*
Years	Team	Apps	(Gls)
1959–1960	Everton	0	(0)
1960–1962	Southport	127	(40)
1962–1964	Rotherham United	23	(1)
1964–1965	Carlisle United	41	(7)
1965–1974	Exeter City	320	(15)
- * Club domestic league appearances and goals

James Donald Blain (born 9 April 1940) is an English professional footballer who made 501 appearances in the Football League playing as a left back or inside forward for Southport, Rotherham United, Carlisle United and Exeter City. Blain was born in Mossley Hill, Liverpool, and began his career as a youngster with Everton, but never played for their first team. After retiring from football he remained in the Exeter area and worked as a carpet fitter. Blain was a schoolmate of John Lennon, Jimmy Tarbuck and Peter Sissons at Dovedale Primary School.
