= Dave Hancock (footballer) =

English footballer

Personal information
- Full name: David Jeffrey Hancock
- Date of birth: 24 July 1938
- Place of birth: Exeter, Devon, England
- Date of death: 6 June 2007 (aged 68)
- Place of death: Cape Town, South Africa
- Position: Wing half

Youth career
- –1955: Plymouth Argyle

Senior career*
Years	Team	Apps	(Gls)
1955–1959	Plymouth Argyle	2	(0)
1959–1964	Torquay United	177	(12)
1964–1966	Exeter City	40	(3)
- Durban United
- * Club domestic league appearances and goals

David Jeffrey Hancock (24 July 1938 – 6 June 2007) was an English professional footballer. He was born in Exeter, Devon and played for all three of the county's professional football teams as well as for the National Team, England.

Hancock began his career as a junior with Plymouth Argyle, turning professional in September 1955. He played twice in the league for Argyle during the 1956–57 season, but failed to make any further appearances and left to join Torquay United in January 1959. He made 177 league appearances for Torquay, scoring twelve goals, and played in the 1959–60 promotion winning side. In March 1964, he moved to Exeter City, scoring 3 times in 40 games before leaving to join South African side Durban United.

Hancock died on 6 June 2007 at the age of 68.
