= Tommy Spratt =

English footballer and manager

Personal information
- Full name: Thomas Spratt
- Date of birth: 20 December 1941 (age 84)
- Place of birth: Cambois, Northumberland, England
- Height: 5 ft 6 in (1.68 m)
- Position: Half-back

Senior career*
Years	Team	Apps	(Gls)
1959–1961	Manchester United	0	(0)
1961–1964	Bradford Park Avenue	118	(45)
1964–1965	Weymouth		
1965–1967	Torquay United	61	(19)
1967–1968	Workington	52	(14)
1968–1969	York City	29	(1)
1969–1972	Workington	143	(26)
1972–1974	Stockport County	65	(6)
1974–	Northwich Victoria		
Total		468	(111)

International career
- England schools
1959	England youth		
- * Club domestic league appearances and goals

Thomas Spratt (born 20 December 1941) is an English former professional footballer who played as a half-back in the Football League for Bradford Park Avenue, Torquay United, Workington, York City and Stockport County, in non-League football for Weymouth and Northwich Victoria and was on the books of Manchester United without making a league appearance. He was an England schools and youth international.
