= Joe Wilson (footballer, born 1937) =

English footballer

Personal information
- Date of birth: 6 July 1937
- Place of birth: Workington, England
- Date of death: 25 September 2015 (aged 78)
- Place of death: Australia
- Position: Full back

Senior career*
Years	Team	Apps	(Gls)
1955–1961	Workington	153	(5)
1961–1964	Nottingham Forest	84	(1)
1964–1967	Wolverhampton Wanderers	58	(0)
1967–1968	Newport County	43	(0)
1968–1973	Workington	169	(4)
- * Club domestic league appearances and goals

Joe Wilson (6 July 1937 – 25 September 2015), was an English footballer who played as a full back. During his professional career he represented Workington (in two spells), Nottingham Forest, Wolverhampton Wanderers and Newport County.
