= Ronnie Cairns =

English footballer

Personal information
- Full name: Ronald Cairns
- Date of birth: 4 April 1934
- Place of birth: Chopwell, England
- Date of death: August 2016 (aged 82)
- Place of death: North Yorkshire, England
- Position: Inside forward

Senior career*
| Years | Team | Apps | (Gls) |
- Consett
| 1953–1959 | Blackburn Rovers | 26 | (7) |
| 1959–1964 | Rochdale | 195 | (66) |
| 1964–1965 | Southport | 34 | (14) |
- Wigan Athletic
| Total | | 255 | (86) |
- * Club domestic league appearances and goals

Ronald Cairns (4 April 1934 – August 2016) was an English professional footballer who played as an inside forward.

== Career ==
Born in Chopwell, Cairns played for Consett, Blackburn Rovers, Rochdale, Southport and Wigan Athletic. He played for Rochdale in the 1962 Football League Cup Final.

== Honours ==
Rochdale

- Football League Cup runner-up: 1961–62
