= Jimmy Thompson (footballer, born 1935) =

English footballer

Personal information
- Date of birth: 26 November 1935 (age 90)
- Place of birth: Oldham, England
- Position: Wing half

Senior career*
Years	Team	Apps	(Gls)
- Chadderton
- Platt Brothers
- Mill Brow
1953–1959	Oldham Athletic	110	(19)
1959–1961	Exeter City	105	(10)
1961–1965	Rochdale	199	(15)
1965–1966	Bradford City	24	(1)
1966–1968	Hyde United	65	(21)
- Buxton
Total		503+	(66+)
- * Club domestic league appearances and goals

Jimmy Thompson (born 26 November 1935) is an English former professional footballer who played as a wing half.

== Career ==
Born in Oldham, Lancashire, Thompson played for Chadderton, Platt Brothers, Mill Brow, Oldham Athletic, Exeter City, Rochdale, Bradford City, Hyde United, and Buxton.

== Honours ==
Rochdale

- Football League Cup runner-up: 1961–62
