= Stan Hepton =

English footballer

Personal information
- Full name: Stanley Hepton
- Date of birth: 3 December 1932
- Place of birth: Leeds, England
- Date of death: 15 April 2017 (aged 84)
- Place of death: Leeds, England
- Positions: Inside forward; wing half

Senior career*
Years	Team	Apps	(Gls)
1952–1957	Blackpool	6	(3)
1957–1959	Huddersfield Town	6	(1)
1959–1960	Bury	14	(3)
1960–1964	Rochdale	149	(21)
1964–1965	Southport	22	(2)
- * Club domestic league appearances and goals

Stanley Hepton (3 December 1932 – 15 April 2017) was an English professional footballer who played in the Football League for Blackpool, Huddersfield Town, Bury, Rochdale and Southport during the 1950s and 1960s.

== Honours ==
Rochdale

- Football League Cup runner-up: 1961–62
