= Joe Richardson (footballer, born 1942) =

English footballer

Personal information
- Full name: Joseph Arthur Searles Richardson
- Date of birth: 17 March 1942
- Place of birth: Liverpool, England
- Date of death: 1966
- Position: Inside forward

Senior career*
Years	Team	Apps	(Gls)
- Winsford United
1959–1960	Sheffield United	0	(0)
1960–1965	Rochdale	115	(31)
Total		115	(31)
- * Club domestic league appearances and goals

Joe Richardson (17 March 1942 – 1966) was an English professional footballer who played as an inside forward.

== Career ==
Born in Sheffield, Richardson played for Rochdale, appearing in the second leg of the 1962 Football League Cup Final. He scored a brace of goals in the 3–1 defeat of Blackburn Rovers that helped Dale to the final of that competition.

== Death ==
Richardson died in 1966 while working as a lorry driver.

== Honours ==
Rochdale

- Football League Cup runner-up: 1961–62
