= List of Bury F.C. players (1–24 appearances) =

Appearances and goals are for first-team competitive matches only. Wartime matches are regarded as unofficial and are excluded, as are matches from the abandoned 1939–40 season.

Name	Nationality	Position	Club career	League apps	League goals	Total apps	Total goals	Notes
Jack Edwards	Wales	FW	1894	2	1	2	1	
Walter Park	England	GK	1894-1895	3	0	3	0	
John Gillespie	Scotland	DF	1894	5	0	5	0	
Joe Kirkland	Ireland	DF	1894	5	0	5	0	
Jonathan White	Scotland	MF	1894	13	0	13	0	
Reuben Crowther	England	FW	1894	2	0	2	0	
Jack Ostler	Scotland	DF	1894-1895	15	6	15	6	
George McNaughton	Scotland	MF	1894-1895	15	0	18	0	
Alex Bell	Scotland	FW	1895	1	0	1	0	
Fred Collinson	England	MF	1895	1	1	1	1	
George Ewing	Unknown	MF	1895	1	0	1	0	
John Gibbon	Unknown	MF	1895	1	0	1	0	
Ted Evans	England	FW	1895	2	0	2	0	
James McDonald	Unknown	MF	1895	2	0	2	0	
John Docherty	Unknown	FW	1895	4	1	4	1	
Charlie Satterthwaite	England	FW	1895-1896	4	2	4	2	
Ernest Hawkins	Wales	DF	1895-1896	7	0	7	0	
Felix Mooney	England	FW	1895-1896	7	2	7	2	
Sam Graham	Scotland	DF	1895-1896	9	0	9	0	
Bob Barr	Scotland	FW	1895-1896	15	6	18	7	
John Earnshaw	England	FW	1896	1	2	1	2	
Bob Crawford	Scotland	FW	1896	2	0	2	0	
Billy Fleming	Scotland	FW	1896	2	1	2	1	
Frank Mobley	England	FW	1896	3	0	3	0	
David Steven	Scotland	MF	1896	3	0	3	0	
John Clarke	Unknown	FW	1896	6	0	6	0	
Billy Hendry	Scotland	DF	1896-1897	8	1	10	1	
Ernest Pooley	England	MF	1897	2	0	2	0	
William Garside	Scotland	FW	1897-1898	5	0	5	0	
John Cust	Scotland	MF	1897-1898	9	1	9	1	
Robert Dobie	Scotland	MF	1897-1898	10	0	11	0	
Billy Wilson	Scotland	MF	1898	1	0	1	0	
Thomas Handford	England	DF	1898	1	0	1	0	
Sam Bennett	England	MF	1898-1899	2	1	3	2	
Walter Neilson	Scotland	DF	1898	3	0	3	0	
James Carnie	Unknown	FW	1898-1899	4	0	4	0	
Bill Evans	England	FW	1898	5	2	5	2	
Archie Nicol	Scotland	MF	1898-1900	18	0	19	0	
Jack Finney	England	MF	1899-1901	3	0	3	0	
Joe Booth	England	FW	1899-1900	7	1	7	1	
James Lamberton	England	DF	1899-1900	7	0	7	0	
Wally Holland	England	FW	1900	1	0	1	0	
Frank Cooper	England	FW	1900	1	0	1	0	
John Reddish	England	FW	1900	1	0	1	0	
Victor Heap	England	MF	1901-1902	3	0	3	0	
Bill Morton	England	MF	1901	7	0	7	0	
Albert Monks	England	FW	1901-1902	16	7	16	7	
Isaac Foster	England	DF	1902	1	0	1	0	
Bill Archer	England	MF	1902-1903	2	0	2	0	
George Storey	England	FW	1902-1903	3	1	3	1	
George Booth	England	FW	1902-1903	5	1	5	1	
George Lamberton	England	FW	1902	22	7	23	7	
Joe Mills	Unknown	MF	1903	1	0	1	0	
Jimmy Hodson	England	DF	1903	2	0	2	0	
Charlie White	England	MF	1903	2	1	2	1	
Davie Ross	England	FW	1903	4	1	4	1	
Julius Gregory	England	DF	1903-1905	14	0	14	0	
Duncan Ronaldson	Scotland	FW	1903-1904	15	4	15	4	
William Green	Unknown	MF	1904	1	0	1	0	
William Brown	England	DF	1904	1	0	1	0	
Richard Harrison	England	MF	1904	1	0	1	0	
Joe Ball	England	MF	1904	4	0	4	0	
Bill Cox	England	FW	1904	4	0	4	0	
Alec Morton	Scotland	FW	1904	4	0	4	0	
John Pickering	England	FW	1904	5	0	5	0	
Jim Smith	England	MF	1904-1905	6	0	6	0	
Jack Williams	England	FW	1904-1906	15	7	15	7	
Ernie Mullineux	England	DF	1904-1906	22	0	22	0	
Tommy Simpson	England	FW	1904-1906	20	8	22	9	
Alf Berry	England	FW	1905	3	2	3	2	
Joe Hodgkinson	England	FW	1905	7	0	7	0	
Gilbert Chorlton	England	MF	1905-1907	15	1	16	1	
Billy Dow	Scotland	FW	1905-1906	15	6	17	8	
Sam Hulmes	England	DF	1905-1906	15	0	17	0	
John Wolstenholme	England	GK	1905-1909	18	0	18	0	
Joseph Bowden	England	DF	1906	1	0	1	0	
Frank Chorlton	England	MF	1906	1	0	1	0	
Fred Bell	England	MF	1906-1907	2	0	2	0	
Sydney Heaton	England	FW	1906	3	0	3	0	
John Shackleton	Unknown	MF	1906	4	0	4	0	
Joe Bulcock	England	DF	1906-1907	5	0	5	0	
Fred Warburton	England	FW	1906-1907	11	5	11	5	
Fred Mearns	England	GK	1906-1908	10	0	11	0	
Herbert Bradley	England	MF	1906-1910	18	0	18	0	
Bert Hodgkinson	Wales	FW	1906-1907	17	3	19	3	
Harry Astley	England	FW	1907	1	0	1	0	
James Brennan	Ireland	FW	1907	1	0	1	0	
Sam Broome	England	FW	1907	1	0	1	0	
Billy Hampson	England	DF	1907-1908	2	0	2	0	
Harry Wilkinson	England	MF	1907	2	0	2	0	
Fred Talbot	England	FW	1907-1908	3	0	4	0	
Harry Tufnell	England	FW	1907-1909	13	3	13	3	
Jimmy Gill	England	DF	1908	1	0	1	0	
Jimmy Morris	England	GK	1908	1	0	1	0	
James Bigden	England	MF	1908	3	0	3	0	
Bobbie Billam	England	DF	1908-1909	5	0	5	0	
Archie Hughes	Scotland	FW	1908-1909	6	3	7	3	
Bob Gibson	England	MF	1908-1909	14	1	14	1	
Charlie Chorlton	England	DF	1909-1910	5	1	5	1	
Alf Smith	England	FW	1909-1911	5	3	5	3	
Bill Domleo	England	DF	1909-1910	14	0	14	0	
Arnie Whittaker	England	MF	1910	0	0	1	0	
John Mcleod	Scotland	DF	1910-1911	2	1	2	1	
George Anderson	England	FW	1910	3	0	3	0	
Harry Vinson	Scotland	MF	1910-1912	3	0	3	0	
Charles Stanfield	Austria	FW	1910	6	2	6	2	
Johnny Walker	Northern Ireland	MF	1910-1912	18	0	19	0	
Jim Holt	England	GK	1910-1911	21	0	22	0	
Dick Walker	England	MF	1910-1912	23	1	23	1	
John Horrocks	England	MF	1911	1	0	1	0	
Albert Beney	England	FW	1911	4	0	4	0	
Barker Cannell	Isle of Man	FW	1911-1912	3	0	4	1	
George Foot	England	GK	1911-1913	8	0	9	0	
Tom Cannon	England	MF	1911-1912	13	0	14	0	
Harry Stewart	Scotland	DF	1912	1	0	1	0	
Jim Fitzsimmons	England	FW	1912	1	0	1	0	
Sam Marsh	England	FW	1912	3	0	3	0	
Alex Culshaw	England	MF	1913	1	0	1	0	
Alex Maxwell	Scotland	FW	1913	1	0	1	0	
John Dockray	England	MF	1913	5	0	5	0	
Harold Meadowcroft	England	MF	1913	5	0	5	0	
Frank Wilson	England	FW	1913-1915	16	6	16	6	
Philip Richmond	England	FW	1914	1	0	1	0	
Jack Parkinson	England	FW	1914	4	3	4	3	
Joe Spottiswood	England	MF	1914-1915	6	1	6	1	
John McKnight	Scotland	FW	1914-1915	22	5	23	5	
Hugh McClelland	Scotland	GK	1915	1	0	1	0	
Sam Spruce	England	MF	1919	1	0	1	0	
Jimmy Woods	England	GK	1919	3	0	3	0	
Joe Kissock	New Zealand	DF	1919-1921	6	0	6	0	
Billy Robertson	Scotland	GK	1919-1920	6	0	6	0	
Jimmy Logan	Scotland	FW	1919-1920	7	2	7	2	
Frank Watmough	England	DF	1919-1920	7	0	7	0	
Ted Rodgerson	England	FW	1919-1920	13	3	13	3	
Jimmy Lister	Scotland	FW	1919-1920	14	6	14	6	
Alf Gregson	England	FW	1919-1921	15	1	15	1	
Sam Hodgkiss	England	FW	1920	1	0	1	0	
Rowland Brindle	England	DF	1920	2	0	2	0	
Joe Scholes	England	MF	1920	2	0	2	0	
Jimmy Stansfield	England	DF	1920	2	0	2	0	
George Schofield	England	MF	1920	1	0	3	0	
Albert Spilsbury	England	GK	1920	3	0	3	0	
Joe Griffiths	England	MF	1920	12	0	12	0	
John Murphy	Scotland	FW	1920-1921	21	5	22	5	
Joe Hulse	England	GK	1921	1	0	1	0	
Sam Kirkman	England	DF	1921	1	0	1	0	
Billy Norton	England	DF	1921	1	0	1	0	
Harry Barnett	England	FW	1921	2	0	2	0	
Ernest Holmes	Unknown	DF	1921	3	0	3	0	
Alf Davies	England	DF	1921	3	0	3	0	
George Perkins	England	MF	1921	4	0	4	0	
John Williamson	England	FW	1921-1922	12	0	12	0	
Billy Kirsopp	England	FW	1921-1922	20	1	21	1	
Ernie Heath	England	GK	1921-1922	23	0	24	0	
Stan Woodhouse	England	MF	1921-1924	23	4	24	4	
Sam Fletcher	England	GK	1922	1	0	1	0	
Charlie Cook	Scotland	MF	1922	1	0	1	0	
Gilbert Turner	England	GK	1922	2	0	2	0	
Tom Partington	England	MF	1923	2	0	2	0	
Tom Hulley	England	GK	1923	3	0	3	0	
Robert Ogden	England	MF	1923-1925	6	1	6	1	
Peter Quinn	England	MF	1923	6	1	9	2	
John Stevenson	England	FW	1923-1924	9	1	9	1	
Reuben Butler	England	FW	1923-1924	20	13	21	13	
Billy Rose	England	FW	1925	1	0	1	0	
Bob Thompson	England	FW	1925	1	0	1	0	
Bert Humpish	England	MF	1925	2	0	2	0	
Arthur Mercer	England	FW	1925	11	3	11	3	
Norman Wilson	England	MF	1925-1926	13	0	13	0	
Harry Fare	England	DF	1926	2	0	2	0	
Jack Davies	England	GK	1926	5	0	5	0	
Tommy Holmes	England	MF	1926-1927	4	0	5	0	
Joe Hughes	Wales	FW	1926-1927	8	6	9	6	
Alex Massie	Scotland	MF	1926-1928	17	4	17	4	
Sam Wynne	England	DF	1926-1927	18	1	19	1	
Fred McLachlan	Scotland	MF	1927	2	0	2	0	
Laurie Crown	England	DF	1927	17	0	17	0	
John Crawford	Scotland	MF	1928	1	0	1	0	
John Moran	England	FW	1928-1929	3	1	3	1	
Luke Curry	England	MF	1928-1932	14	0	15	0	
George Jordan	Scotland	DF	1929	1	0	1	0	
Norman Kirby	England	MF	1929	5	1	5	1	
Dick Rushton	England	MF	1929	5	0	5	0	
John Maughan	England	GK	1929-1930	7	0	7	0	
Tommy Robertson	England	DF	1929-1931	13	0	13	0	
Dai Gethin Evans	Wales	MF	1929	19	0	19	0	
Harry Brant	Scotland	FW	1929-1930	22	6	22	6	
Jack Martin	England	MF	1930	1	1	1	1	
John Snaith	England	FW	1930-1931	3	0	3	0	
Joe Armstrong	England	MF	1931	2	0	2	0	
Tom Robinson	England	MF	1931	2	0	2	0	
Joe Leightley	England	FW	1931	4	1	4	1	
Roy Clipson	England	DF	1931-1933	7	0	7	0	
Jack Smith	England	GK	1931	11	0	11	0	
Don Bird	Wales	MF	1932	0	0	1	0	
Frank Ryder	England	MF	1932-1933	6	3	6	3	
Ian McFadyen	Scotland	FW	1932	6	2	6	2	
Alf Edmonds	England	MF	1932-1934	13	0	13	0	
Les Cant	England	GK	1933	4	0	4	0	
Jimmy Younger	England	MF	1934	2	1	2	1	
Harry Jolly	England	DF	1934-1935	3	0	3	0	
Arthur Smith	England	MF	1934	4	0	4	0	
Albert Gregory	England	MF	1934-1935	6	0	7	0	
Jim Treanor	England	MF	1934	11	0	11	0	
Harry O'Grady	England	FW	1934-1935	15	4	16	5	
James O'Rourke	England	FW	1934-1935	16	8	16	8	
Alex McMurdo	Scotland	MF	1935	1	0	1	0	
Harold Blackmore	England	FW	1935	6	4	6	4	
Joseph Lisle	England	MF	1935	6	0	6	0	
Joe Patrick	England	FW	1935	15	10	15	10	
Billy Hallard	England	MF	1936	1	0	1	0	
Jack Firth	England	MF	1936-1937	7	4	7	4	
Dai Lewis	Wales	MF	1936-1937	8	0	8	0	
John Wylie	Scotland	MF	1937	0	0	1	0	
John Foreman	England	MF	1937	4	1	4	1	
Fred Smith	England	FW	1937-1938	6	0	7	0	
Jimmy Boyd	Scotland	MF	1937	9	2	10	2	
Peter Dougal	Scotland	FW	1938-1939	16	2	16	2	
Archie Livingstone	Scotland	FW	1938-1939	24	8	24	8	
David Henderson	Scotland	DF	1939	1	0	1	0	
Jack Watson	Scotland	DF	1939-1946	6	0	7	0	
Fred Roberts	Wales	MF	1939-1946	12	5	16	9	
John McNeill	Malta	FW	1939	15	6	15	6	
Viv Aston	England	DF	1939-1948	23	0	24	0	
Fred Blondel	England	FW	1946	1	0	1	0	
Frank Herbert	England	MF	1946	0	0	2	0	
Jimmy McGill	Scotland	FW	1946	1	0	2	1	
Ronnie Anderson	England	FW	1946	2	0	2	0	
Bill Bainbridge	England	FW	1946	2	1	2	1	
Cec Wyles	England	FW	1946	2	0	2	0	
Eddie Lyons	England	DF	1946-1949	2	0	3	0	
Maurice Tompkin	England	FW	1946	0	0	4	1	
Terry Meaney	England	FW	1946-1947	4	2	4	2	
Bert Taylor	England	GK	1946-1948	4	0	6	0	
Jack Livesey	England	FW	1946	7	1	7	1	
Jackie Moss	England	FW	1946	7	2	11	3	
Jack Lindsay	Scotland	FW	1946-1947	11	7	12	7	
Jack Robinson	England	GK	1946-1947	12	0	13	0	
Bobby Reid	Scotland	MF	1946-1947	17	1	17	1	
Ernie Woodcock	England	MF	1946-1948	18	3	19	3	
George Mutch	Scotland	FW	1946-1947	21	8	21	8	
Norman Berry	England	MF	1946-1947	23	6	24	6	
Bert Williams	England	FW	1947	1	0	1	0	
Cliff Leeming	England	MF	1947	1	0	2	0	
Bill Hurst	England	MF	1947-1948	1	0	2	0	
Walter Keeley	England	FW	1947	7	0	7	0	
Bill Jarman	Wales	FW	1947	10	1	10	1	
Tom Peters	England	FW	1947	10	1	10	1	
Charlie Hogan	England	MF	1948	1	0	1	0	
David Wilson	Scotland	MF	1948	2	1	2	1	
Bob Crosbie	Scotland	FW	1948	9	5	9	5	
Bob Kelly	Scotland	MF	1948-1949	9	0	9	0	
Andy Dolan	Scotland	FW	1948-1949	10	2	11	2	
Johnny Halpin	England	DF	1949	2	0	2	0	
Dennis Thomas	England	MF	1949-1950	3	0	3	0	
Don Clegg	England	GK	1949-1950	15	0	15	0	
Willie Barclay	Scotland	MF	1949	17	1	17	1	
Irvin Cavanagh	England	FW	1950	1	0	1	0	
Jimmy Jackson	Scotland	MF	1950	1	0	1	0	
Arthur Evans	England	GK	1950	2	0	2	0	
Jimmy Inglis	Scotland	FW	1950	2	0	2	0	
Joe Steele	Scotland	MF	1950-1951	18	1	18	1	
Frank Wood	England	DF	1951	1	0	1	0	
Albert Keetley	England	DF	1951	4	0	4	0	
Jim Hayman	England	DF	1951	5	0	5	0	
Norman Moore	England	FW	1952	2	0	2	0	
Bobby Dale	England	MF	1952-1953	15	2	15	2	
Harry Gordon	Scotland	MF	1952-1957	21	0	21	0	
Bert Head	England	DF	1952-1953	22	0	23	0	Manager of Bury 1965-1966
Harry Hitchen	England	MF	1953-1954	2	0	2	0	
Harry Williams	England	FW	1953	2	0	2	0	
Gus McLean	Wales	DF	1953	12	0	12	0	
Bobby McIlvenny	Northern Ireland	FW	1954-1955	12	1	12	1	
Vince Jack	Scotland	DF	1955-1956	10	0	10	0	
Peter Greenwood	England	FW	1956	1	0	1	0	
Alvan Williams	Wales	DF	1956	2	1	2	1	
John Heath	England	GK	1956-1961	8	0	9	0	
Billy Ritchie	Scotland	FW	1957-1958	13	7	14	7	
Jimmy Mercer	Scotland	MF	1957-1959	18	1	21	2	
James Reid	Scotland	FW	1957-1958	21	9	23	10	
Tony McNamara	England	MF	1958-1959	14	0	15	0	
Brian Howcroft	England	DF	1958	20	0	20	0	
Jack Pollitt	England	FW	1959	4	0	4	0	
Stan Hepton	England	FW	1959-1960	15	3	15	3	
Jeff Tonge	England	MF	1960	1	0	1	0	
Tony Moulden	England	FW	1960-62	4	0	4	0	
Bill Bradbury	England	FW	1960	18	4	18	4	
Graham McInnes	Scotland	FW	1961	1	0	1	0	
Mike Brennan	England	DF	1961	0	0	1	0	
Les Riggs	England	MF	1961-1962	6	0	6	0	
Frank Twist	England	MF	1961-1963	8	0	9	0	
Dave Hickson	England	FW	1962	8	0	8	0	
Warren Bradley	England	MF	1962-1963	13	1	17	2	
Paul Durrant	England	MF	1962-1965	21	6	23	6	
Tony Brooks	England	FW	1963	1	0	1	0	
Tony Morrin	England	MF	1963-1965	3	0	3	0	
Peter Simpson	England	FW	1963-1964	4	0	5	0	
John Rawlingson	England	DF	1964-1965	2	0	2	0	
Colin Bell	England	MF	1964-1966	10	2	10	2	
Brian Pilkington	England	MF	1964-1965	20	0	21	0	
Barry Grayson	England	FW	1965	1	0	1	0	
David Knowles	England	GK	1965	1	0	1	0	
Brian Albeson	England	DF	1965	1	0	1	0	
Gordon Roberts	Wales	MF	1965	2	0	3	0	
Kevin Randall	England	FW	1965	4	0	4	0	
Tommy Henderson	Scotland	MF	1965	7	1	8	1	
Jim Clunie	Scotland	DF	1965-1966	10	0	11	0	
John Bain	Scotland	DF	1965-1967	12	0	12	0	
Ronnie Bird	England	MF	1965	13	3	13	3	
Ray Pointer	England	FW	1965	19	17	20	17	
Ken Bracewell	England	DF	1966	1	0	1	0	
Geoff Carter	England	MF	1966-1967	4	0	4	0	
George Kerr	Scotland	FW	1966	15	2	16	2	
Colin Waldron	England	DF	1966-1967	20	0	21	0	
Gordon Eadie	Scotland	MF	1967	2	0	2	0	
Alan Tyrer	England	MF	1967	3	0	3	0	
Phil Anderson	Northern Ireland	MF	1967-1968	7	1	8	1	
Gary France	England	MF	1968	1	0	1	0	
Lammie Robertson	Scotland	MF	1968	5	0	7	0	
Jim Connell	England	MF	1969	9	2	9	2	
Alex Rae	Scotland	MF	1969	11	0	14	0	
Jim Cassell	England	MF	1970	3	0	3	0	
Stan Bowles	England	MF	1970	5	0	6	0	
Bobby Noble	England	DF	1970	6	0	7	0	
Jimmy O'Connor	Scotland	MF	1970	7	2	7	2	
Terry Alcock	England	DF	1972	6	1	6	1	
Ian Warburton	England	FW	1972-1973	6	2	7	2	
David Embleton	England	DF	1972	7	0	8	0	
Vic Dougherty	Scotland	DF	1972	9	0	10	0	
Charlie Gisbourne	England	DF	1972-1974	16	1	18	1	
Tommy Horsfall	Scotland	MF	1973	1	0	1	0	
Bobby Smith	England	MF	1973	0	0	1	0	Manager of Bury 1973-1977
Andy Sweeney	England	MF	1973	2	0	2	0	
Terry Gennoe	England	GK	1973	3	0	3	0	
Ian Miller	Scotland	MF	1973-1974	15	0	16	1	
David Hughes	England	MF	1973	12	4	17	4	
David Howitt	England	DF	1973-1974	20	4	23	4	
Steve Melledew	England	FW	1973-1974	20	2	23	2	
Peter McDonnell	England	GK	1974	1	0	1	0	
Malcolm Brown	England	DF	1974-1977	11	0	11	0	
Colin D'Arcy	England	GK	1975	4	0	4	0	
Malcolm Smith	England	FW	1975	5	1	5	1	
Kevin Moore	England	MF	1976-1977	4	0	4	0	
Jimmy Mullen	England	MF	1976-1977	4	0	6	0	
Terry Curran	England	MF	1977	2	0	2	0	
Joe Murty	Scotland	MF	1977-1978	1	0	2	0	
Malcolm Darling	Scotland	FW	1978	2	0	2	0	
Dave Latchford	England	GK	1979	2	0	6	0	
Mike Betts	England	DF	1980	1	0	1	0	
Kevin Mooney	England	DF	1980	1	0	1	0	
Jack Trainer	Scotland	DF	1980	1	1	2	1	
Don Graham	England	DF	1980-1981	7	0	9	0	
David Bradley	England	DF	1980-1981	8	0	10	1	
Kevin Tully	England	MF	1980-1981	10	1	13	1	
Benny Phillips	England	DF	1980	14	0	18	0	
John Platt	England	GK	1981-1982	20	0	24	0	
John Hughes	England	MF	1982	2	0	2	0	
Brian Smith	England	MF	1982	6	0	6	0	
Steve Baines	England	DF	1982	7	0	7	0	
Ian Davies	England	DF	1982-1983	14	0	15	0	
Steve Kenworthy	Wales	DF	1982	14	0	16	0	
John Breckin	England	DF	1982	17	0	17	0	
Gary Hilton	England	GK	1983-1984	1	0	2	0	
Vince O'Keefe	England	GK	1983	2	0	2	0	
Ray Mountford	England	GK	1983	4	0	5	0	
Ray McHale	England	MF	1983	6	0	6	0	
Len Cantello	England	MF	1983	9	1	9	1	
John Butcher	England	GK	1983-1985	16	0	16	0	
Terry Park	England	MF	1983-1984	21	1	24	0	
Paul Jones	Unknown	MF	1984	0	0	1	0	
Danny Keough	England	MF	1985	0	0	1	0	
Marcus Phelan	England	GK	1985	0	0	1	0	
Steve Eagleton	Unknown	DF	1985	0	0	2	0	
Heath Reynolds	England	DF	1985	0	0	3	1	
Andy Welsh	England	FW	1985-1986	1	0	5	0	
Garry Lowe	England	DF	1985-1986	4	0	6	0	
Chris Grimshaw	England	MF	1985-1986	3	0	8	0	
Darren Beckford	England	FW	1985	12	5	12	5	
Richard Harrison	England	DF	1986	0	0	1	0	
David Moran	Unknown	DF	1986	0	0	1	0	
Jimmy Collins	England	DF	1986-1988	11	0	12	0	
Peter Butler	England	MF	1986	11	0	14	1	
Bob Colville	England	FW	1986-1987	11	1	15	2	
David Cross	England	FW	1986	13	0	16	1	
Jonathan Clark	Wales	MF	1986	14	1	16	1	
Craig Brown	England	MF	1987	0	0	1	0	
Andy Walsh	England	DF	1988	1	0	1	0	
Steve Holland	England	MF	1988	0	0	1	0	
Tony Godden	England	GK	1988	1	0	2	0	
David Jones	England	FW	1988 1991-1992	10	0	12	0	
Gary Leonard	England	MF	1988-1989	9	1	12	1	
Derek Fazackerley	England	DF	1988-1989	14	0	14	0	
Marlon Beresford	England	GK	1989	1	0	1	0	
Roger Eli	England	MF	1989	2	0	2	0	
Dave Windridge	England	MF	1989	1	0	4	0	
Darren Wassall	England	DF	1989	7	1	7	1	
Paul Atkin	England	DF	1989-1991	21	1	24	1	
Pat Bradley	Australia	DF	1990	1	0	2	0	
Gareth Price	England	MF	1990-1991	4	0	5	0	
Dean Spink	England	FW	1990	6	1	6	1	
Tony Cullen	England	MF	1991	5	0	5	0	
Mike Sheron	England	FW	1991	5	1	7	1	
Paul Robertson	England	DF	1991-1992	8	0	11	0	
Paul Morris	England	DF	1992	1	0	1	0	
John Norman	England	FW	1992	2	0	2	0	
Steve Gardner	England	DF	1992-1993	1	0	3	0	
Laurie Greenhalgh	England	DF	1992	2	0	3	0	
Graham Branch	England	MF	1992	4	1	5	1	
Andy Kilner	England	MF	1992	5	0	5	0	
Danny Sonner	Northern Ireland	MF	1992-1993	5	3	9	4	
Gary Flitcroft	England	MF	1992	12	0	12	0	
Ian Scott	England	MF	1992	9	2	12	2	
Paul Collings	England	GK	1993	1	0	1	0	
Craig Nixon	England	GK	1993	0	0	1	0	
Graeme Worsley	England	DF	1993	1	0	1	0	
Kenny Woods	England	MF	1993	2	0	2	0	
Colin McKee	Scotland	FW	1993	2	0	3	0	
Dave Hanson	England	FW	1993	1	0	3	0	
David Esdaille	England	MF	1993	6	0	6	0	
Phil Jones	England	DF	1993	4	0	6	0	
Adie Mike	England	FW	1993	7	1	7	1	
Gary Powell	England	FW	1993	5	0	8	1	
Paul Fitzpatrick	England	DF	1993	9	0	9	0	
Luther Blissett	England	FW	1993	10	1	13	2	
Neil Matthews	England	FW	1994	2	1	2	1	
Peter Reid	England	MF	1994	1	0	2	0	
Jason Beckford	England	MF	1994	3	0	3	0	
Miguel De Souza	England	FW	1994	3	0	3	0	
Rodney Rowe	England	FW	1994	3	0	3	0	
John Ryan	England	DF	1994	9	0	9	0	
Mark Sertori	England	DF	1994-1996	13	1	20	2	
Mike Harle	England	DF	1995	1	0	1	0	
Nick Richardson	England	MF	1995	5	0	6	0	
Dave Lancaster	England	FW	1995	10	1	12	1	
Paul Edwards	England	DF	1996	4	0	4	0	
Gary Brabin	England	MF	1996	5	0	5	0	
Nicky Reid	England	DF	1996-1997	15	0	16	0	
Brian Linighan	England	DF	1997 2000	3	0	5	0	
Steve Morgan	England	DF	1997	5	0	5	0	
Andy Gray	Scotland	FW	1997-1998	6	1	6	1	
Jason Peake	England	MF	1997	6	0	6	0	
Andy Scott	England	FW	1997	8	0	8	0	
Paul Dalglish	Scotland	FW	1997-1998	12	0	13	0	
John O'Kane	England	MF	1997	13	3	14	3	
Bruce Grobbelaar	Zimbabwe	GK	1998	1	0	1	0	
Simon Baldry	England	MF	1998	5	0	5	0	
John Foster	England	DF	1998	7	0	7	0	
Bryan Small	England	DF	1998	18	1	18	1	
Carlos Rocha	Portugal	FW	1999	3	0	3	0	
Derek Lilley	Scotland	FW	1999	5	1	5	1	
Ryan Souter	England	DF	1999-2000	5	0	5	0	
Lee Richardson	England	MF	1999	5	1	5	1	
Paul Hall	Jamaica	MF	1999	7	0	7	0	
Carl Serrant	England	DF	1999	15	0	15	0	
Paul Challinor	England	DF	2000	1	0	1	0	
Lee Buggie	England	FW	2000–2001	1	0	2	0	
Andy Smith	Northern Ireland	FW	2000	2	0	3	0	
Steve Halford	England	DF	2000–2001	5	0	5	0	
Marvin Bryan	England	DF	2000	9	0	9	0	
Dean Crowe	England	FW	2000	11	2	11	2	
Warren Peyton	England	MF	2001	1	0	2	0	
Matt Murphy	England	MF	2001-2002	9	0	10	0	
George Syros	Greece	DF	2001	9	1	10	1	
David Borley	England	MF	2001-2002	21	3	24	3	
Gary Evans	England	DF	2002	1	0	1	0	
Phil Clarkson	England	MF	2002	4	0	4	0	
Steve Gunby	England	MF	2002-2003	6	0	7	0	
Liam George	England	FW	2002-2003	8	1	10	1	
Pawel Abbott	Poland	FW	2002-2003	17	6	20	6	
Phil Charnock	England	MF	2003	3	0	3	0	
Justin Thompson	Canada	FW	2003	1	0	3	1	
Ben Thornley	England	FW	2003	5	0	5	0	
Phil Gulliver	England	DF	2003	10	0	11	0	
Greg Strong	England	DF	2003	10	0	11	0	
Glenn Whelan	Ireland	MF	2003-2004	13	0	15	0	
Graeme Jones	England	FW	2004	3	1	3	1	
Jon Cartledge	England	DF	2004-2005	16	1	16	1	
Jon Daly	Ireland	FW	2004 2006	18	3	18	3	
Andy Marriott	Wales	GK	2004-2005	19	0	21	0	
Steve Burke	England	FW	2005	1	0	1	0	
David Moore	England	FW	2005	3	0	3	0	
Damien Quigley	England	FW	2005	1	0	3	0	
Andy Keogh	Ireland	FW	2005	4	2	4	2	
Gary Harkins	Scotland	MF	2005	5	0	5	0	
Bas Savage	England	FW	2005	5	0	5	0	
Danny Boshell	England	MF	2005	6	0	6	0	
Aaron Grundy	England	GK	2005-2007	2	0	6	0	
Ricky Shakes	Guyana	MF	2005	7	0	7	0	
Craig Dootson	England	GK	2005-2006	5	0	7	0	
Danny Reet	England	FW	2005	6	4	8	4	
Jake Sedgemore	England	DF	2005	9	0	10	1	
John Hardiker	England	DF	2005	11	0	13	0	
Allan Smart	Scotland	FW	2005-2006	13	1	14	1	
Stuart Barlow	England	FW	2005	13	0	15	0	
Jamie Burns	England	MF	2006	1	0	1	0	
Ben Saunders	England	FW	2006	1	0	1	0	
David Hannah	Scotland	MF	2006	2	0	2	0	
Nathan Jarman	England	FW	2006	2	0	2	0	
Lewis Edge	England	GK	2006	1	0	2	0	
Lee Jones	Wales	GK	2006	2	0	2	0	
Joe Anyinsah	England	MF	2006	3	0	3	0	
Anthony Williams	Wales	GK	2006	3	0	3	0	
Daryl Taylor	England	MF	2006	4	0	5	0	
Marc Goodfellow	England	MF	2006	4	0	6	0	
Stephen Turnbull	England	MF	2006-2007	5	0	6	0	
Lewis Gobern	England	MF	2006	7	1	7	1	
Ian Ross	England	MF	2006	7	0	7	0	
Matty Blinkhorn	England	FW	2006-2007	10	0	10	0	
Jon-Paul Pittman	England	FW	2006	9	1	10	1	
Alan Fettis	Northern Ireland	GK	2006-2007	9	0	12	0	
Colin Marrison	England	FW	2006	16	0	16	0	
Andy Warrington	England	GK	2006-2007	20	0	21	0	
Marcus Richardson	England	FW	2007	1	0	1	0	
Ricky Anane	England	DF	2007-2008	0	0	2	0	
Tony Bedeau	Grenada	FW	2007	4	0	4	0	
Nicky Wroe	England	MF	2007	5	0	5	0	
Liam Hughes	England	MF	2007	4	0	5	0	
James Dean	England	FW	2007	4	0	6	0	
Lee Bullock	England	MF	2007	8	0	8	0	
Will Mocquet	France	MF	2007	9	0	9	0	
Jack Dorney	England	MF	2007-2008	7	0	11	0	
Darran Kempson	England	DF	2007	12	0	12	0	
Jason Kennedy	England	MF	2007	12	0	12	0	
Dale Stephens	England	MF	2007-2008	9	1	12	1	
Domaine Rouse	England	FW	2007-2009	12	0	15	1	
Paul Morgan	Northern Ireland	DF	2007	20	0	22	0	
Chris O'Grady	England	FW	2008	6	0	6	0	
Simon Yeo	England	FW	2008	8	0	8	0	
Dean Howell	England	DF	2008 2013	11	0	13	0	
Darren Randolph	Ireland	GK	2008	14	0	14	0	
Adam Rooney	Ireland	FW	2008	16	3	16	3	
Jordan Robertson	England	FW	2009	4	1	5	1	
John Welsh	England	MF	2009	5	0	6	0	
Simon Johnson	England	MF	2009	4	0	6	0	
Phil Jevons	England	FW	2009	7	2	9	2	
Mark Tyler	England	GK	2009	11	0	11	0	
Danny Carlton	England	FW	2009-2010	10	0	14	0	
Tom Elliott	England	FW	2009-2010	16	1	17	1	
James Wallace	England	MF	2010	0	0	1	0	
Keigan Parker	Scotland	FW	2010	2	0	2	0	
Gavin Gunning	Ireland	DF	2010-2011	2	0	2	0	
Ritchie Branagan	Ireland	GK	2010	2	0	3	0	
Sam Hewson	England	MF	2010	7	0	7	0	
Owain Fôn Williams	Wales	GK	2010-2011	6	0	8	0	
James Poole	England	FW	2010 2014	13	0	13	0	
Richard Eckersley	England	DF	2011	3	0	3	0	
Luke McCarthy	England	MF	2011	1	0	3	0	
Kudos Oyenuga	England	FW	2011	1	0	3	0	
Chris Holroyd	England	FW	2011	4	1	4	1	
Patrick Cregg	Ireland	MF	2011-2012	7	0	8	0	
Max Harrop	England	MF	2011-2012 2024	12	2	16	2	
Mike Grella	United States	FW	2011-2012	10	4	10	4	
Mark Cullen	England	FW	2011-2012	14	1	16	1	
David Amoo	England	MF	2011-2012	17	4	18	4	
Shane Byrne	Ireland	MF	2011-2012	17	0	19	0	
Ryan Doble	Wales	FW	2012	5	0	5	0	
Seb Carole	France	MF	2012-2013	4	0	5	0	
Jonathan Bond	England	GK	2012	6	0	6	0	
Gregg Wylde	Scotland	MF	2012-2013	4	0	7	0	
Domenic Poleon	England	FW	2012	7	2	8	2	
Nathan Clarke	England	DF	2012	11	0	11	0	
Marcus Marshall	England	MF	2012	9	0	11	0	
Troy Hewitt	England	FW	2012	8	2	12	2	
Lateef Elford-Alliyu	England	FW	2012	18	2	19	2	
David Healy	Northern Ireland	FW	2012-2013	16	1	19	1	
Adam Lockwood	England	DF	2012-2013	18	1	20	1	
Matt Doherty	Ireland	DF	2012-2013	17	1	22	3	
Tom Hopper	England	FW	2012-2013	22	3	24	3	
Scott Harrison	England	DF	2013	1	0	1	0	
Tom Pratt	England	FW	2013	2	0	2	0	
Marco Navas	Spain	MF	2013	2	0	3	0	
Regan Walker	England	FW	2013-2014	3	0	3	0	
John Rooney	England	FW	2013	3	0	4	0	
Jessy Reindorf	Rwanda	FW	2013	4	1	5	2	
Euan Holden	Scotland	DF	2013	3	0	6	0	
Stephane Zubar	Guadeloupe	DF	2013	6	0	6	0	
Jordan Mustoe	England	DF	2013	6	0	6	0	
Valéry Mézague	Cameroon	MF	2013	7	0	7	0	
Tope Obadeyi	England	FW	2013-2014	7	0	8	0	
Danny Hylton	England	FW	2013	7	2	9	2	
Marlon Jackson	England	FW	2013	8	1	9	1	
Carl Regan	England	DF	2013	10	0	10	0	
Jordan Sinnott	England	MF	2013	9	1	10	1	
Craig Fagan	England	FW	2013	11	1	11	1	
Jonson Clarke-Harris	Jamaica	FW	2013	12	4	12	4	
Richard Hinds	England	DF	2013-2014	10	1	13	2	
Gareth Roberts	Wales	DF	2013	11	0	13	0	
Ashley Grimes	England	FW	2013-2014	15	0	18	0	
William Edjenguélé	France	DF	2013-2014	19	2	23	3	
Shaun Beeley	England	DF	2013	20	0	24	1	
Marcus Poscha	England	MF	2014	1	0	1	0	
Keil O'Brien	England	DF	2014	0	0	1	0	
Joe Widdowson	England	DF	2014	1	0	1	0	
James Burke	England	DF	2014	2	0	2	0	
Reice Charles-Cook	Grenada	GK	2014	2	0	2	0	
Rob Milsom	England	MF	2014	2	0	2	0	
Hayden White	England	DF	2014	2	0	2	0	
Scott Loach	England	GK	2014	2	0	3	0	
Lewis Young	England	DF	2014	4	0	4	0	
Joe Thompson	England	MF	2014	1	0	4	0	
Courtney Duffus	Ireland	FW	2014	3	0	5	0	
Jake Carroll	Ireland	DF	2014	6	1	6	1	
Duane Holmes	United States	MF	2014	6	0	7	0	
Shwan Jalal	Iraq	GK	2014	5	0	8	0	
Jean-Louis Akpa Akpro	France	FW	2014	10	0	10	0	
Anthony Dudley	England	FW	2014-2016	9	0	12	0	
Freddie Veseli	Albania	DF	2014	18	0	18	0	
Clive Platt	England	FW	2014	19	2	19	2	
Scott Burgess	England	MF	2014-2017	20	2	23	2	
Adam El-Abd	Egypt	DF	2014-2015	24	1	24	1	
Rob Holding	England	DF	2015	1	0	1	0	
Aaron McCarey	Ireland	GK	2015	1	0	1	0	
Khalid Mohammed	England	MF	2015	1	0	1	0	
Jack Ruddy	Scotland	GK	2015	1	0	1	0	
Matty Foulds	England	DF	2015	0	0	2	0	
Lee Erwin	Scotland	FW	2015	3	0	3	0	
Joe Dodoo	Ghana	FW	2015	4	0	5	0	
Chris Eagles	England	MF	2015-2016	4	0	5	0	
Christian Walton	England	GK	2015	4	0	6	0	
Tom Eaves	England	FW	2015	9	1	9	1	
Daniel Bachmann	Austria	GK	2015-2016	8	0	10	0	
Nick Pope	England	GK	2015	22	0	22	0	
Rob Bourne	England	MF	2016	1	0	1	0	
Emeka Obi	Nigeria	DF	2016	0	0	1	0	
Paul Rachubka	England	GK	2016	1	0	1	0	
Rob Harker	England	FW	2016-2017	0	0	2	0	
Ishmael Miller	England	FW	2016-2017	3	0	3	0	
Sean Clare	England	MF	2016	4	0	4	0	
Nathan Delfouneso	England	FW	2016	4	0	4	0	
Nicky Clark	Scotland	FW	2016	3	0	4	0	
Danny Gardner	England	FW	2016	6	0	6	0	
Jacob Bedeau	England	DF	2016-2017	7	0	7	0	
Jermaine Pennant	England	MF	2016	7	0	7	0	
Cian Bolger	Ireland	DF	2016	9	0	9	0	
Chris Neal	England	GK	2016	10	0	10	0	
Kean Bryan	England	DF	2016-2017	12	0	13	0	
Ian Lawlor	Ireland	GK	2016	12	0	15	0	
Tom Walker	England	MF	2016-2017	11	0	15	1	
John O'Sullivan	Ireland	MF	2016	19	0	19	0	
Niall Maher	England	DF	2016-2017	17	0	22	1	
Cameron Hill	England	MF	2017	0	0	1	0	
Tom Beadling	Australia	DF	2017	2	0	2	0	
Alex Bruce	Northern Ireland	DF	2017	2	1	2	1	
Jack Mackreth	England	MF	2017	3	0	3	0	
Chris Sang	England	FW	2017-2018	2	0	3	0	
Saul Shotton	England	DF	2017-2018	4	0	6	0	
Dai Wai Tsun	China	MF	2017-2018	8	0	11	1	
Alex Whitmore	England	DF	2017	8	0	11	0	
Alex Dobre	Romania	MF	2017	10	0	12	0	
Paul Caddis	Scotland	DF	2017	13	0	13	0	
Chris Humphrey	Jamaica	MF	2017	10	0	13	0	
Jordan Williams	England	DF	2017	9	0	14	0	
Jermaine Beckford	Jamaica	FW	2017-2018	16	8	17	8	
Cameron Burgess	Australia	DF	2017	18	0	18	0	
Taylor Moore	England	DF	2017	19	0	19	0	
Leo Fasan	Italy	GK	2017-2018	15	0	21	0	
Josh Laurent	England	MF	2017-2018	22	1	22	1	
Tom Aldred	England	DF	2017-2018	19	1	23	1	
Michael Smith	England	FW	2017-2018	19	1	23	2	
Aaron Brown	Northern Ireland	FW	2018	0	0	1	0	
Dougie Nyaupembe	Zimbabwe	DF	2018	1	0	2	0	
Matt Hudson	England	GK	2018-2019	0	0	4	0	
Callum Hulme	England	MF	2018-2019	1	0	4	0	
Joe Adams	Wales	MF	2018-2019	3	0	6	0	
Jamie Barjonas	Scotland	MF	2018	4	0	8	0	
Tom Miller	England	DF	2018-2019	7	0	15	0	
Connor Ripley	England	GK	2018	15	0	16	0	
Gold Omatayo	Switzerland	FW	2018-2019	13	1	17	1	
James Hanson	England	FW	2018	17	0	18	0	
Chris Dagnall	England	FW	2018-2019	17	3	19	4	
Scott Wharton	England	DF	2019	15	2	15	2	
Jordan Rossiter	England	MF	2019	16	1	17	1	
Kieran Nolan	England	DF	2020	0	0	1	0	
Aaron Dwyer	England	MF	2020	2	0	2	0	
Mitchell Bryant	England	FW	2020	0	0	1	0	
Kamar Moncrieffe	England	FW	2020	3	0	3	0	
Tommy Lent	England	DF	2020	2	0	3	0	
Kai Calderbank-Park	Australia	GK	2020	3	0	3	0	
Alex O'Keefe	England	FW	2020	3	1	3	1	
Callum Bagshaw	Scotland	FW	2020	0	0	1	0	
Jordan Downing	England	DF	2020-2021	11	1	13	1	
Greg Daniels	England	FW	2020-2021	13	2	16	3	
Tony Whitehead	Ireland	MF	2020	6	1	7	1	
Scott Metcalfe	England	DF	2020	7	1	8	1	
Edward Wilczynski	Ireland	GK	2020	4	0	5	0	
Joe Stanley	England	DF	2020	1	0	2	0	
Arthur Feudjio	Netherlands	MF	2020	1	0	1	0	
Ayomide Ibrahim	Ireland	DF	2020-2021	16	3	22	3	
Nathan Valentine	England	MF	2020	2	0	2	0	
Bailey Sloane	England	DF	2020 2025-	16	5	17	5	As of end of 2025-26 season
Gregory Hartley	England	GK	2021	2	0	2	0	
Anthony Whitehead	?	?	2021	3	0	3	0	
Oliver Fannon	England	MF	2021-2022	2	0	3	0	
Thomas Stewart	England	GK	2021	1	0	1	0	
Samuel Oluwabiyi	Nigeria	MF	2021	3	0	3	0	
Theo Roberts	England	GK	2021	0	0	1	0	
Sonny Whittingham	England	MF	2021	3	1	3	1	
Thomas Schofield	England	MF	2022	3	0	4	0	
Alex McQuade	England	DF	2022	0	0	2	0	
Rhain Hellawell	England	MF	2022-	8	0	10	0	
Jack Coop	England	FW	2022	3	0	3	1	
Leon Armasalam	England	MF	2022	1	0	1	0	
Leighton Egan	England	DF	2022	2	0	2	0	
Jake O'Brien	England	MF	2022	3	0	3	0	
Bradley Sixsmith	England	MF	2022	1	0	1	0	
Mosopeoluwo Awe	England	FW	2022	1	0	1	0	
Luke Nicholls	England	FW	2022	3	0	4	0	
David Lynch	Ireland	MF	2022	3	0	3	0	
Taylor Jones	England	DF	2022	2	0	2	0	
Abdulahi Ahmed	England	MF	2022	1	0	1	0	
Michael Monaghan	Ireland	FW	2022-2023	16	2	16	2	
Samuel Unwin	England	MF	2022-2023	10	0	10	0	
Sidney Santos	England	FW	2022	1	0	1	0	
Fopefoluwa Deru	England	FW	2022	0	0	1	0	
Josh Ollerenshaw	England	GK	2023	2	0	2	0	
Jack Hewitt-Hill	England	GK	2023	1	0	1	0	
Thomas Corner	England	FW	2023	5	0	5	0	
Tnique Fishley	England	DF	2023	1	0	1	0	
Sam Ashton	England	GK	2023-2024	1	0	3	0	
Benito Lowe	England	FW	2023-2024	15	9	18	11	
Darius Palma	England	FW	2023	4	3	7	3	
Harry Brazel	England	MF	2023	11	2	12	2	
Daniel Lafferty	England	DF	2023	13	0	15	0	
Curtis Obeng	England	DF	2023	3	0	3	0	
Sajjad Elhassan	England	FW	2023	21	5	21	5	
Abimbola Obasoto	Ireland	MF	2023	11	1	13	1	
Luis Morrison-Derbyshire	England	DF	2023	2	0	3	0	
Jack Lenehan	England	MF	2023	17	1	18	1	
Tom Kilifin	England	FW	2023	6	0	6	0	
Jordi Nsaka	France	DF	2023	16	0	18	0	
Shakeel Jones-Griffiths	England	MF	2023	12	2	13	2	
Andrew Hollins	England	DF	2023	7	0	7	0	
Niall Battersby	England	DF	2023	1	0	2	0	
Ben McKenna	Northern Ireland	MF	2023	1	0	1	0	
Gabriel Cole	Australia	DF	2023	3	0	3	0	
Joe Duckworth	England	FW	2023	6	3	8	3	
Dan Cockerline	England	FW	2023	3	0	3	0	
Joe Hobson	England	FW	2023-2024	11	3	13	3	
Ethan Kachosa	England	DF	2023	6	0	7	0	
Kyle Hayde	England	DF	2023	1	0	2	0	
Luis Cantello	England	MF	2023	4	0	5	0	
Danny Taberner	England	GK	2023-2024	2	0	3	0	
Andy Kellett	England	MF	2023-2024	11	0	16	0	
Sam Burns	England	FW	2023-2024	13	6	16	6	
Declan Daniels	England	FW	2023-2024	16	8	16	8	
Sam Jones	England	GK	2023-	0	0	2	0	
Damola Sotana	England	MF	2023-	1	0	1	0	
Joseph Hudson		FW	2023-	0	0	1	0	
Mason Beard	England	FW	2023-	0	0	3	3	
Cole Dewhurst			2023-	0	0	1	0	
Jack Cooper			2023-	0	0	1	0	
Jack Parker			2023-	0	0	1	0	
Oliver Holt			2023-	0	0	1	0	
Harry Brockbank	England	DF	2024	4	0	5	0	
Andre Mendes	Brazil	GK	2024	1	0	1	0	
Ollie Kilner	England	DF	2024	10	0	10	0	
Keenan Ferguson	England	DF	2024	7	0	7	0	
Jacob Holland-Wilkinson	England	MF	2024	16	4	16	4	
Arthur Lomax-Jones	England	MF	2024	13	2	13	2	
Joe Maguire	England	DF	2024	2	0	2	0	
Aaron Morris	England	DF	2024	5	0	5	0	
Dean Pinnington	Isle of Man	MF	2024	10	2	10	2	
Miles Storey	England	FW	2024	7	0	7	0	
Tom Stewart	England	GK	2024	6	0	8	0	
Will Calligan	England	DF	2024-	7	0	11	0	
Macauley Wilson	England	DF	2024	6	1	9	1	
Brad Carroll	England	MF	2024-	3	0	5	0	As of end of 2025-26 season
Efe Ambrose	Nigeria	DF	2024	4	1	7	1	
Jack Dunn	England	FW	2024-2025	3	0	6	0	
Alik Babayan	England	MF	2024-	7	0	10	1	
Ben Hockenhull	England	DF	2024-2025	22	3	24	4	
Jack Pearce	England	DF	2024-	0	0	1	0	
Cole Dewhurst	England	DF	2024-	0	0	1	0	
David Oko	England	DF	2024-	0	0	2	0	
Luis Cantello	England	MF	2024-	0	0	1	0	
Mamudu Touray Touray	England	FW	2024-	1	0	3	0	
Patrick Jarrett	England	MF	2024-2025	7	1	10	1	
Shay Fox	England	FW	2024-	0	0	1	0	
Zaid Smith	England	FW	2024-	0	0	2	0	
Jermaine Dickinson-Grant	England	FW	2024-	0	0	2	3	
Russell Saunders	England	GK	2024-	1	0	6	0	As of end of 2025-26 season
Prindi Kimputu	England	DF	2024-	0	0	1	0	
Ethan Bradshaw	England	DF	2024-	0	0	1	0	
Blerti Jacaj	England	DF	2024-	0	0	1	0	
Tye Turner	England	MF	2024-	0	0	1	0	
William Hayes	England	MF	2024-	0	0	1	0	
Liam Sergent	England	GK	2024-	0	0	1	0	
Calvin Harper	England	MF	2024-	0	0	1	0	
Bamba Fall	England	DF	2024-	0	0	1	0	
Adam Cullen	England	FW	2024-	0	0	1	0	
Aaron Chalmers	England	DF	2024-	22	4	25	4	
Courtney Meppen-Walter	England	DF	2024-	5	0	5	0	
Morgan Homson-Smith	England	FW	2024-	2	0	2	0	
Lewis Byrne	England	FW	2025-	14	4	14	4	
Louis Jeanne	England	DF	2025-	10	0	10	0	
Tyler James	England	FW	2025-	30	14	37	18	As of end of 2025-26 season
Reece Kendall	England	DF	2025-	19	0	20	0	As of end of 2025-26 season
Aiden Walker	England	DF	2025-	20	3	24	3	As of end of 2025-26 season
Scott Duxbury	England	DF	2025-	6	0	8	0	As of end of 2025-26 season
Callum Spooner	England	MF	2025-	14	0	17	0	As of end of 2025-26 season
Owen Robinson	England	MF	2025-	18	3	18	3	As of end of 2025-26 season
Kieran Lloyd	England	DF	2025-	1	0	2	0	As of end of 2025-26 season
Kieran Glynn	England	MF	2025-	18	1	23	1	As of end of 2025-26 season
Gabriel Johnson	England	FW	2025-	12	1	16	3	As of end of 2025-26 season
Ryan Atkinson	England	FW	2025-	1	0	3	0	As of end of 2025-26 season
Gavin Massey	England	FW	2025-	10	2	12	2	As of end of 2025-26 season
Owen Barker	England	MF	2025-	8	0	8	0	As of end of 2025-26 season
Luke Tabone	Malta	DF	2025-2026	4	0	5	0	
Lewis Rawsthorn	England	FW	2025-	12	6	12	6	As of end of 2025-26 season
Leo Graham	England	FW	2025-	16	3	17	3	As of end of 2025-26 season
Momodou Touray	Wales	FW	2026-	17	8	18	9	As of end of 2025-26 season
Joe Piggott	England	FW	2026-	6	0	6	0	As of end of 2025-26 season
Toto Nsiala	DRC	DF	2026-	2	0	2	0	As of end of 2025-26 season
Luca Navvaro	England	FW	2026-	11	2	11	2	As of end of 2025-26 season
Veron Parny	England	FW	2026-	2	0	2	0	As of end of 2025-26 season
Jordan Lazenbury	England	MF	2026-	4	0	4	0	As of end of 2025-26 season
Louis White	England	MF	2026-	6	0	6	0	As of end of 2025-26 season
Tom Carr	England	FW	2026-	6	1	6	1	As of end of 2025-26 season
Samuel Grady	England	GK	2025-	1	0	1	0	As of end of 2025-26 season
Josh Ashe	England	DF	2025-	0	0	1	0	As of end of 2025-26 season
Faeth Abdulkader	England	DF	2025-	0	0	1	0	As of end of 2025-26 season
Jaylen Peters-Webbe	England	DF	2025-	0	0	2	0	As of end of 2025-26 season
Frazer Gaulton	England	DF	2025-	0	0	2	0	As of end of 2025-26 season
Oliver Brooks Hopkins	England	DF	2025-	0	0	1	0	As of end of 2025-26 season
Daniel Hayhurst	England	MF	2025-	0	0	2	0	As of end of 2025-26 season
Destin Vika	England	FW	2025-	0	0	2	0	As of end of 2025-26 season
Freddie Ackerley	England	MF	2025-	0	0	2	0	As of end of 2025-26 season
Alex Mather	England	FW	2025-	0	0	2	0	As of end of 2025-26 season
Liam Gould	England	MF	2025-	0	0	2	0	As of end of 2025-26 season
Gerald McCullion	England	FW	2025-	1	0	4	1	As of end of 2025-26 season
George Whitwell	England		2025-	0	0	1	0	As of end of 2025-26 season
Adam Cooke	England		2025-	0	0	1	0	As of end of 2025-26 season
Jayden Jones	England		2025-	0	0	1	0	As of end of 2025-26 season
Avian Fennell	England		2025-	0	0	1	0	As of end of 2025-26 season
Joe Lynchey	England		2025-	0	0	1	0	As of end of 2025-26 season
Jaylen Webbe	England		2025-	0	0	1	0	As of end of 2025-26 season
Patrick Johnrose	England		2025-	0	0	1	1	As of end of 2025-26 season
Matty Read	England		2025-	0	0	1	0	As of end of 2025-26 season
Jack O'Malley	England		2025-	0	0	1	0	As of end of 2025-26 season
