= 2023–24 Bury F.C. season =

Bury
2023–24 season
- Chairman: Phil Young; Marcel De Matas
- Manager: Andy Welsh; Dave McNabb
- Stadium: Gigg Lane
- North West Counties Premier Division: 3rd
- FA Cup: Preliminary Round
- FA Vase: Second Round
- Manchester Premier Cup: First Round
- Macron Cup: Third Round
- Top goalscorer: League: Andrew Briggs (23 Goals); All: Andrew Briggs (24 Goals)
- Highest home attendance: 4,833 vs Prestwich Heys (26 December 2023); North West Counties Premier Division
- Lowest home attendance: 0 vs Barnoldswick Town (12 March 2024); North West Counties Premier Division vs Charnock Richard (16 March 2024); North West Counties Premier Division
- Average home league attendance: 3,338
- Biggest win: 10–1 vs Skelmersdale United (H), 27 January 2024
- Biggest defeat: 1–3 vs Chadderton (H), 12 August 2023

The 2023–24 season was Bury F.C.'s first season since the club's merger with the phoenix club Bury A.F.C. The club competed in the North West Counties Premier Division, in the 9th tier.

== Transfers and contracts ==
=== In ===
Date from	Position	Nationality	Name	From	Fee	Ref.
7 June 2023	FW	(England)	Benito Lowe	(England) Wythenshawe Town	Free	
7 June 2023	WB	(England)	Gareth Peet	(England) Atherton Collieries	Free	
10 June 2023	FB	(England)	Matty Williams	(England) Bury AFC	Free	
10 June 2023	AT	(England)	Darius Palma	(England) Wythenshawe Town	Free	
11 June 2023	LB	(England)	Carl Dickinson	(England) Eccleshall	Free	
18 June 2023	AT	(England)	Andy Briggs	(England) Steeton	Free	
18 June 2023	CB	(England)	Daniel Lafferty	(England) Atherton Collieries	Free	
19 June 2023	MF	(England)	Andy Kellett	(England) Guiseley	Free	
19 June 2023	MF	(England)	Harry Brazel	(England) Bury AFC	Free	
20 June 2023	CB	(England)	Jimmy Moore	(England) Bury AFC	Free	
25 June 2023	MF	(England)	Chris Rowney	(England) Bury AFC	Free	
25 June 2023	MF	(England)	Jack Lenehan	(England) Atherton Collieries	Free	
21 July 2023	DF	(England)	Luis Morrison-Derbyshire	(England) Stafford Rangers	Free	
21 July 2023	DF	(Australia)	Gabriel Cole	(Australia) Monaro Panthers	Free	
22 July 2023	WG	(England)	Sajjad Elhassan	(England) Bury AFC	Free	
22 July 2023	DF	(England)	Jack Tinning	(England) Bury AFC	Free	
22 July 2023	MF	(England)	Anton Smith	(England) Bury AFC	Free	
22 July 2023	GK	(England)	Jack Hewitt-Hill	(England) Bury AFC	Free	
24 July 2023	DF	(France)	Jordi Nsaka	(England) Congleton Town	Free	
4 August 2023	DF	(Republic of Ireland)	Abimbola Obasoto	(England) Clitheroe	Free	
5 August 2023	RB	(England)	Curtis Obeng	(England) Macclesfield	Free	
30 September 2023	AM	(England)	Andy Scarisbrick	(England) Bootle	Free	
30 September 2023	MF	(England)	Charlie Doyle	(England) Bootle	Free	
3 October 2023	CH	(England)	Oliver Jepson	(England) Kidsgrove Athletic	Free	
6 October 2023	MF	(England)	Jordan Butterworth	(England) Bamber Bridge	Free	
11 October 2023	MF	(Wales)	Billy Reeves	(England) Bootle	Free	
11 October 2023	CB	(England)	Tom Moore	(England) Bootle	Free	
17 October 2023	ST	(England)	Joe Duckworth	(England) Witton Albion	Free	
21 October 2023	GK	(England)	Harry Wright	(England) Cheadle Town	Free	
7 December 2023	ST	(England)	Declan Daniels	(England) Irlam	Free	
7 December 2023	DF	(England)	Ethan Kachosa	(England) Lewes	Free	
16 January 2024	AM	(England)	Jacob Holland-Wilkinson	(England) Lancaster City	Free	
21 January 2024	MF	(England)	Arthur Lomax	(England) Bootle	Undisclosed	
6 February 2024	MF	(England)	Sam Coughlan	(England) Everton U18s	Free	
9 March 2024	MF	(England)	Dean Pinnington	FC Isle of Man	Free	
19 March 2024	WR	(England)	Max Harrop	(England) Avro	Free	
19 March 2024	RB	(England)	Keenan Ferguson	(England) Spennymoor Town	Free	
29 March 2024	GK	(Brazil)	Andre Mendes	(England) Lancaster City	Free	
29 March 2024	LB	(England)	Joe Maguire	(England) Tranmere Rovers	Free	
1 April 2024	CB	(England)	Aaron Morris	(England) FC United of Manchester	Free	
1 April 2024	FW	(Zimbabwe)	Tanaka Cherera	(England) AFC Liverpool	Free	

=== Out ===
Date from	Position	Nationality	Name	Reason	To	Fee	Ref.
24 July 2023	LB	(England)	Carl Dickinson	travelling a long distance to training & matches	(England) Congleton Town	Free	
11 October 2023	CB	(England)	Jimmy Moore	Retirement	NA	NA	
28 March 2024	CB	(England)	Sam Burns	Transfer	(England) Warrington Rylands 1906	Free	
28 March 2024	MF	(England)	Jordan Butterworth	Transfer	(England) Stalybridge Celtic	Free	

=== Loaned in ===
Date from	Position	Nationality	Name	From	Date Until	Ref.
11 January 2024	CB	(England)	Ollie Kilner	(England) Oldham Athletic	End of Season	
6 February 2024	CB	(England)	Harry Brockbank	(England) Radcliffe	5 March 2024 / 28 Day Loan	
1 March 2024	FW	(England)	Miles Storey	(England) Curzon Ashton	29 March 2024/ 28 Day Loan	

=== Loaned out ===
Date from	Position	Nationality	Name	To	Date until	Ref.
28 March 2024	FW	(England)	Benito Lowe	(England) Stalybridge Celtic	24 April 2024 28 Days	

=== New Contract ===
Date	Position	Nationality	Name	signed on	Contracted until	Ref.
7 June 2023	GK	(Wales)	Jack Atkinson	7 June 2023	18 May 2024	
7 June 2023	WR	(England)	Connor Comber	7 June 2023	18 May 2024	
7 June 2023	RW	(England)	Lewis Gilboy	7 June 2023	18 May 2024	

== Pre-season and friendlies ==
Win Draw Loss

1 July 2023	Thackley	0–3	Bury	Bradford
15:30 BST		Report	Gilboy 41'; Elhassan 81', 86'	Stadium: Dennyfield; Attendance: 831

4 July 2023	Hyde United	2–2	Bury	Hyde
19:45 BST	Dawson 43'; Thompson 66'	Report	Lowe 22'; Smith 63'	Stadium: Ewen Fields; Attendance: 574

8 July 2023	Bury	0–6	Bradford City	Bury
15:00 BST		Report	Pattison 7'; Cook 12'; Osadebe 27'; Ridehalgh 28'; Derbyshire 53'; Walker 88'	Stadium: Gigg Lane; Attendance: 2,135

9 July 2023	Bury	0–3	Preston North End	Bury
15:00 BST		Report	Taylor 25'; Leigh 54'; Nelson 72'	Stadium: Gigg Lane; Attendance: 2,254

11 July 2023	Bury	4–3	1874 Northwich	Bury
19:45 BST	Elhassan 11'; Lowe 38'; Unwin 46'; Comber 79' (pen.)	Report	Unknown 32'; Green 45'; Unknown 90+1'	Stadium: Gigg Lane; Attendance: 848

15 July 2023	Macclesfield	5–2	Bury	Macclesfield
15:00 BST	Campbell 19'; Berry 48'; Unknown 50'; Unknown 63'; Curran 87'	Report	Lowe 24'; Lafferty 77'	Stadium: Moss Rose; Attendance: 996

18 July 2023	Bury	C–C	Stockport Town	Bury
19:45 BST		Report		Stadium: Gigg Lane

22 July 2023	Bury	4–2	Golcar United	Bury
15:00 BST	Briggs 13'; Lowe 19', 26'; Elhassan 56'	Report	Leonard 52'; Unknown 67'	Stadium: Gigg Lane; Attendance: 827

25 July 2023	Nelson	0–1	Bury	Nelson
19:45 BST		Report	Gilboy 6'	Stadium: Victoria Park; Attendance: 323

== Competitions ==
Win Draw Loss

=== North West Counties Premier Division ===
1 August 2023 1	Colne	1–3	Bury	Colne
19:45 BST	Watkinson 61'	Report	Briggs 24'; Lowe 45+2'; Palma 45+4' (yellow card); Laffertty (yellow card); Obeng (yellow card) 62'	Stadium: Holt House; Attendance: 1,469

8 August 2023 2	Wythenshawe Town	2–3	Bury	Wythenshawe
19:45 BST	Nock 24' (pen.); Burns 33'; (yellow card) (yellow card) (yellow card) (yellow card) (yellow card) (yellow card) (yellow card) (yellow card)	Report	Lenehan (yellow card) 21'; Rowney (yellow card) 23'; Briggs 47', 56' (yellow card); Palma (yellow card) 66'; Elhassan 78' (pen.) (yellow card)	Stadium: Ericstan Park; Attendance: 1,084

12 August 2023 3	Bury	1–3	Chadderton	Bury
15:00 BST	Palma 25' (pen.); (yellow card) (yellow card)	Report	87'; 90+2'; 90+9'	Stadium: Gigg Lane; Attendance: 4,115; Referee: Bob Richards

15 August 2023 4	Padiham	1–2	Bury	Padiham
19:45 BST	90+5'	Report	Lenehan 45+5'; Palma 46'; Nsaka (yellow card) 68'	Stadium: Arbories Memorial Sports Ground; Attendance: 1,207; Referee: Andrew Cottrell

22 August 2023 5	Bury	2–3	Kendal Town	Bury
19:45 BST	Briggs 15', 55'	Report	Yawson 47', 65'; 60'	Stadium: Gigg Lane; Attendance: 3,252; Referee: Justin Walton

26 August 2023 6	Bury	2–1	Cheadle Town	Bury
15:00 BST	Brazel 33'; Jones-Griffiths (yellow card) 40'; Gilboy 73'	Report	Pilkington 62'	Stadium: Gigg Lane; Attendance: 3,235; Referee: Anthony Ross

28 August 2023 7	Charnock Richard	2–2	Bury	Charnock Richard
15:00 BST	15'; 88'	Report	Briggs 27'; 44' (o.g.); Brazel (yellow card) 54'; J. Moore (yellow card) 63'; Atkinson (yellow card) 69'; Peet (yellow card) 86'	Stadium: Mossie Park; Attendance: 901; Referee: Ryan Bostock

2 September 2023 8	Bury	4–3	West Didsbury & Chorlton	Bury
15:00 BST	Obasoto 8' (yellow card) 79'; Tinning (yellow card) 23'; Jones-Griffiths (yellow card) 38'; Peet (yellow card) 53'; Briggs 57', 70'; Lowe (yellow card) 86' (goal) 90+6'	Report	39'; McKnight 86'; 90'	Stadium: Gigg Lane; Attendance: 3,838; Referee: Daniel Woodyat

5 September 2023 9	Wythenshawe	1–1	Bury	Wythenshawe
19:45 BST	Hevingham (red card) 39'; Dickov 89' (pen.)	Report	Jones-Griffiths 49' (yellow card); Brazel (yellow card); Williams (yellow card); Peet (yellow card) 86'	Stadium: Hollyhedge Park; Attendance: 1,400; Referee: Thomas De Prez

9 September 2023 10	Bury	1–1	Longridge Town	Bury
15:00 BST	Lowe 84'	Report	Anderton 2'	Stadium: Gigg Lane; Attendance: 3,700; Referee: Lee Corns

16 September 2023 11	Lower Breck	2–1	Bury	Liverpool
15:00 BST	Walsh 7'; 29'	Report	Briggs 66' (pen.); Brazel (yellow card)	Stadium: Anfield Sports and Community Centre; Attendance: 589

19 September 2023 12	Squires Gate	0–2	Bury	Blackpool
19:45 BST		Report	J. Moore (yellow card) 32'; Rowney 47'; Comber 65'; Lafferty (yellow card); Briggs (yellow card)	Stadium: The Brian Addison Stadium; Attendance: 421

23 September 2023 13	Bury	4–1	Colne	Bury
15:00 BST	Jones-Griffiths 25'; Brazel 44'; Briggs 49', 52'; J. Moore (yellow card)	Report	Doyle 29'	Stadium: Gigg Lane; Attendance: 3,317; Referee: Matthew Moss

26 September 2023 14	Bury	1–0	F.C. Isle of Man	Bury
20:00 BST	Peet 33'; Jones-Griffiths (yellow card); Brazel (yellow card) 74'	Report		Stadium: Gigg Lane; Attendance: 2,909; Referee: Jacob Viera

30 September 2023 15	Glossop North End	2–1	Bury	Glossop
15:00 BST	Freedman 15'; Badrock 90+7'	Report	Scarisbrick 27'; Doyle (yellow card) 30'; Lafferty (yellow card) 33'; Lowe (yellow card) 44'; Peet (red card) 47'	Stadium: Surrey Street; Attendance: 1,120; Referee: Jack Lambert

3 October 2023 16	Bury	4–2	Litherland REMYCA	Bury
19:45 BST	Jepson 9' (yellow card) 24'; Lowe 61', 64' (pen.); Comber 90'; Gilboy (yellow card) 90'	Report	Dunne 6' (pen.); Nugent 13'	Stadium: Gigg Lane; Attendance: 2,467; Referee: Jamie Kilgannon

7 October 2023 17	Barnoldswick Town	0–7	Bury	Barnoldswick
15:00 BST		Report	Dean 37' (o.g.); Lowe 39'; Gilboy 42'; Comber 59'; Elhassan 78', 86'; J. Moore 82'	Stadium: Greenberfield Lane; Attendance: 1,004; Referee: Samuel Oldfield

14 October 2023 18	Chadderton	3–2	Bury	Chadderton
15:00 BST	Dean (yellow card) 54' (yellow-red card) 90+2'; Sutcliffe 57'; Jones 87'; Knight 90+7'	Report	Scarisbrick 43'; Jepson 51' (yellow card) 72'; T. Moore (yellow card)	Stadium: Andrew Street; Attendance: 1,279

21 October 2023 19	Bury	4–0	Wythenshawe Town	Bury
15:00 BST	Duckworth 4', 46', 74'; Scarisbrick 62'; Jepson (yellow card) 88'; Smith (yellow card) 90'	Report		Stadium: Gigg Lane; Attendance: 3,195; Referee: Thomas De Prez

24 October 2023 20	Bury	1–0	Squires Gate	Bury
19:45 BST	Lowe 60'; Comber (yellow card)	Report		Stadium: Gigg Lane; Attendance: 2,270; Referee: Jamie Dolphin

28 October 2023 21	West Didsbury & Chorlton	0–3	Bury	Chorlton-cum-Hardy
15:00 BST	Davis (red card) 39'; Smyth (red card) 62'	Report	Comber (yellow card) 27' (goal) 30' (red card) 67'; Cockerline (yellow card) 41'; Duckworth (yellow card) 63'; Smith 90+5'; Briggs 90+9' (pen.)	Stadium: The Recreation Ground; Attendance: 1,320; Referee: Ciaran Williams

4 November 2023 22	Kendal Town	0–2	Bury	Kendal
15:00 GMT		Report	Scarisbrick 24', 58'	Stadium: Parkside Road; Attendance: 1,300; Referee: Bob Richards

25 November 2023 23	Skelmersdale United	2–1	Bury	Burscough
15:00 GMT	Bollongino 43'; Butterworth 48' (o.g.); Ibrahim (red card) 71'	Report	Burns 74' (pen.)	Stadium: The Community Ground; Attendance: 700

28 November 2023 24	Bury	3–1	Pilkington	Bury
19:45 GMT	Doyle (yellow card) 14', (yellow card) 73' to 83'; Comber 25'; Duckworth (yellow card) 65'; Jepson (yellow card) 79'; Reeves 87'; Hobson 90'	Report	Rutherford 76'	Stadium: Gigg Lane; Attendance: 2,552
Note: Doyle was sin-binned on second yellow card.

13 December 2023 25	Longridge Town	1–2	Bury	Longridge
19:45 GMT	Turner 49'	Report	Burns 43' (pen.); Daniels 55'; Peet (yellow card) 65'	Stadium: The Recycling Lives Ground; Attendance: 677

23 December 2023 26	Burscough	2–2	Bury	Burscough
15:00 GMT	Rigby 86' (pen.); Coughlan 90+3'	Report	Daniels 79'; Briggs 90+4'; Jepson (yellow card); Scarisbrick (yellow card)	Stadium: The Community Ground; Attendance: 606

26 December 2023 27	Bury	2–0	Prestwich Heys	Bury
15:00 GMT	T. Moore 26', 76'; Doyle (yellow card) 61'; Comber (yellow card)	Report		Stadium: Gigg Lane; Attendance: 4,833

30 December 2023 28	A.F.C. Liverpool	0–2	Bury	Crosby
15:00 GMT		Report	Daniels 18'; Briggs 38'; Reeves (yellow card) 86'	Stadium: Rossett Park; Attendance: 877; Referee: Chris Cooper-Tonge

6 January 2024 29	Bury	3–0	Irlam	Bury
15:00 GMT	Briggs (yellow card) 34' (goal) 72'; Jepson (yellow card) 48'; Daniels 67'; Hobson 90+8'	Report		Stadium: Gigg Lane; Attendance: 3,304

13 January 2024 30	Litherland REMYCA	0–6	Bury	Litherland
15:00 GMT		Report	Scarisbrick 31'; Briggs 47', 90+5'; Daniels 61' (pen.), 70'; Hobson 89'	Stadium: Litherland Sports Park; Attendance: 449

27 January 2024 31	Bury	10–1	Skelmersdale United	Bury
15:00 GMT	Briggs 7'; Comber 18'; Scarisbrick 21'; Daniels 45+4' (yellow card) 62'; Holland-Wilkinson 66', 77', 86' (pen.); Lomax-Jones 70'; Jepson (yellow card) 85'; Lowe 90+2'; Burns 90+5'	Report	Grimshaw 73'; Barnes (yellow card) 85'; Da Costa (red card) 85'	Stadium: Gigg Lane; Attendance: 3,219; Referee: Ciaran Williams

3 February 2024 32	Pilkington	2–3	Bury	St Helens
15:00 GMT	Ellis 24'; Gilchrist 90'	Report	Briggs 15', 28'; Jepson 22'; Scarisbrick (yellow card) 57'	Stadium: Ruskin Drive; Attendance: 603

10 February 2024 33	Bury	2–2	Burscough	Bury
15:00 GMT	Scarisbrick (yellow card) 18'; Briggs 51'; Daniels 55'	Report	Rigby 33'; Darr; Sample (red card) 81'	Stadium: Gigg Lane; Attendance: 2,941

13 February 2024 34	Cheadle Town	0–2	Bury	Cheadle
19:45 GMT		Report	Lowe 53' (pen.); Lomax-Jones (yellow card) 57'; Briggs 60'	Stadium: Park Road Stadium; Attendance: 656

18 February 2024 35	F.C. Isle of Man	0–2	Bury	Douglas
11:00 GMT		Report	Jepson (yellow card) 3'; Burns 51' (pen.), 79'; Coughlan (yellow card) 90'	Stadium: The Bowl; Attendance: 2,461

24 February 2024 36	Bury	1–0	Glossop North End	Bury
15:00 GMT	Holland-Wilkinson 48' (yellow card) 89'; Peet (yellow card) 64'	Report		Stadium: Gigg Lane; Attendance: 3,131
Note: match was originally played with Bury FC Winning 5–1 on July 29 in front of 5,451 fans, but was replayed due to inelligible player.

2 March 2024 37	Bury	2–1	Lower Breck	Bury
15:00 GMT	Lowe (yellow card) 29'; T. Moore 37'; Lomax-Jones 69'; Wright (yellow card) 72'	Report	Buckley 44'	Stadium: Gigg Lane; Attendance: 2,934

9 March 2024 38	Irlam	1–0	Bury	Irlam
15:00 GMT	Cartwright 13'	Report		Stadium: Silver Street; Attendance: 1,250

12 March 2024 39	Bury	1–2	Barnoldswick Town	Bury
19:45 GMT	Burns 26'; T. Moore (yellow card) 55'; Daniels (yellow card) 80'	Report	G. Hill 77'; A. Hill 81'	Stadium: Gigg Lane; Attendance: 0

16 March 2024 40	Bury	2–2	Charnock Richard	Bury
12:30 GMT	Scarisbrick (yellow card) 45+1'; Jepson 45+3'; Reeves 74'; Lowe (yellow card) 84'; Kilner (yellow card) 86'	Report	Carsley 27', 53'	Stadium: Gigg Lane; Attendance: 0

30 March 2024 41	Bury	1–1	Wythenshawe	Bury
15:00 GMT	Jepson (yellow card) 41'; Scarisbrick (yellow card) 59'; T. Moore 63'; Comber (yellow card) 90+5'	Report	Ly 90+10' (pen.)	Stadium: Gigg Lane; Attendance: 4,212

1 April 2024 42	Prestwich Heys	1–2	Bury	Prestwich
15:00 BST	Molloy 5'	Report	Comber 39', 60'; Ferguson (yellow card) 76'	Stadium: Adie Moran Park; Attendance: 1,000

6 April 2024 43	Bury	3–0	A.F.C. Liverpool	Bury
15:00 BST	Harrop (yellow card) 15' (goal) 50', 62'; Briggs 75'	Report		Stadium: Gigg Lane; Attendance: 3,368

11 April 2024 44	Bury	2–1	Ramsbottom United	Bury
19:45 BST	Comber 7'; Pinnington 61'	Report	Birchall 90'	Stadium: Gigg Lane; Attendance: 3,776

16 April 2024 45	Bury	1–2	Padiham	Moston
19:45 BST	Pinnington (yellow card) 32'; Cherera (yellow card) 70'; Comber 90+7'	Report	Brownhill 12'; Beck 60'	Stadium: Broadhurst Park; Attendance: 3,521

20 April 2024 46	Ramsbottom United	0–0	Bury	Ramsbottom
15:00 BST		Report		Stadium: Harry Williams Riverside Stadium; Attendance: 2,138

=== Play-Offs ===
30 April 2024 SF	Bury	1–0	Charnock Richard	Bury
19:45 BST	Cherera 48'; Briggs (yellow card) 81'; Scarisbrick (yellow card) 90'	Report		Stadium: Gigg Lane; Attendance: 4,099

4 May 2024 F	Wythenshawe Town	1–1 (3–2 p)	Bury	Wythenshawe
15:00 BST	Sheridan 53'	Report	Doyle (yellow card) 24'; Pinnington 83'	Stadium: Ericstan Park; Attendance: 1,320
	Penalties
	Uche (penalty scored); Liptrott (penalty missed); Bentham (penalty scored); Ajayi (penalty missed); Metz (penalty missed); Sheridan (penalty scored)		Comber (penalty missed); Jepson (penalty missed); Coughlan (penalty scored); T. Moore (penalty missed); Holland-Wilkinson (penalty scored); Morris (penalty missed)

=== F.A. Cup ===
5 August 2023 Extra Preliminary	Uttoxeter Town	1–4	Bury	Bury
15:00 BST	Conlon 11'	Report	Lowe 23', 71'; Higgins 33'; Comber 90+4' (pen.)	Stadium: Gigg Lane; Attendance: 2,903; Referee: Alex Shaw

19 August 2023 Preliminary	Charnock Richard	3–2	Bury	Charnock Richard
15:00 BST	Darr 59'; Power 82', 90+6'	Report	Comber 3'; Tinning 50'; Taberner (yellow card); Brazel (yellow card)	Stadium: Mossie Park; Attendance: 979

=== Manchester FA Premier Cup ===
10 October 2023 1	Glossop North End	2–1	Bury	Glossop
15:00 BST	Katumba 4'; Valentine 72' (pen.)	Report	Beard 16' (yellow card) 28'; Jones-Griffiths (yellow card) 46' (red card) 90+5'; Holt (yellow card) 88'	Stadium: Surrey Street; Attendance: 308; Referee: Daniel Sykes

=== FA Vase ===
11 November 2023 2	Whickham	1–0	Bury	Whickham
15:00 BST	Agnew 76'	Report	Lowe (yellow card) 72'; Burns (yellow card) 75'	Stadium: The Glebe Sports Ground; Attendance: 709

=== Macron Cup ===
18 November 2023 2	Ramsbottom United	2–2 (5–6 p)	Bury	Ramsbottom
15:00 BST	Sephton 23'; Dudley 81' (pen.)	Report	Rowney (yellow card) 42'; Butterworth (yellow card) 55'; Jepson (yellow card) 64'; Briggs 79'; T. Moore 90+4'	Stadium: Harry Williams Riverside Stadium; Attendance: 1,699
	Penalties
	Walder (penalty scored); Sephton (penalty scored); Lewis (penalty scored); Dudley (penalty missed); Chingwaro (penalty scored); Lockett (penalty missed) ? (penalty scored); Walker (penalty missed)		Reeves (penalty scored); T. Moore (penalty scored); Briggs (penalty missed); Burns (penalty scored); Kellett (penalty scored); Scarisbrick (penalty missed); Jepson (penalty scored); Peet (penalty scored)

16 December 2023 3	Bury	0–1	Charnock Richard	Bury
15:00 BST	Smith (yellow card) 51'	Report	Haydock 62'	Stadium: Gigg Lane; Attendance: 1,131

== Squad statistics ==
=== Appearances and goals ===
No.	Pos	Nat	Player	Total		NWC Prem		FA Cup		Macron Cup		FA Vase		Manchester Cup	
No.	Pos	Nat	Player	Apps	Goals	Apps	Goals	Apps	Goals	Apps	Goals	Apps	Goals	Apps	Goals
	GK	(England) ENG	Sam Ashton	3	0	1+0	0	0+0	0	2+0	0	0+0	0	0+0	0
	GK	(England) ENG	Harry Wright	29	0	28+0	0	0+0	0	0+0	0	1+0	0	0+0	0
	GK	(Brazil) BRA	Andre Mendes	1	0	1+0	0	0+0	0	0+0	0	0+0	0	0+0	0
	GK	(England) ENG	Sam Jones	1	0	0+0	0	0+0	0	0+0	0	0+0	0	1+0	0
	DF	(England) ENG	Gareth Peet	46	1	38+3	1	2+0	0	1+1	0	1+0	0	0+0	0
	DF	(England) ENG	Oliver Jepson	31	4	26+2	4	0+0	0	2+0	0	1+0	0	0+0	0
	DF	(England) ENG	Thomas Moore	31	5	28+0	4	0+0	0	2+0	1	1+0	0	0+0	0
	DF	(England) ENG	Ollie Kilner	10	0	5+5	0	0+0	0	0+0	0	0+0	0	0+0	0
	DF	(England) ENG	Keenan Ferguson	7	0	7+0	0	0+0	0	0+0	0	0+0	0	0+0	0
	DF	(England) ENG	Joe Maguire	2	0	1+1	0	0+0	0	0+0	0	0+0	0	0+0	0
	DF	(England) ENG	Aaron Morris	5	0	2+3	0	0+0	0	0+0	0	0+0	0	0+0	0
	MF	(England) ENG	Anton Smith	16	1	0+13	1	0+1	0	2+0	0	0+0	0	0+0	0
	MF	(England) ENG	Andy Kellett	16	0	4+7	0	2+0	0	2+0	0	0+1	0	0+0	0
	MF	(England) ENG	Andrew Scarisbrick	37	7	33+1	7	0+0	0	1+1	0	1+0	0	0+0	0
	MF	(England) ENG	Charlie Doyle	30	0	28+0	0	0+0	0	1+0	0	1+0	0	0+0	0
	MF	(Wales) WAL	Billy Reeves	32	2	28+1	2	0+0	0	0+2	0	1+0	0	0+0	0
	MF	(England) ENG	Jordan Butterworth	25	0	18+4	0	0+0	0	1+1	0	1+0	0	0+0	0
	MF	(England) ENG	Jacob Holland-Wilkinson	16	4	9+7	4	0+0	0	0+0	0	0+0	0	0+0	0
	MF	(England) ENG	Arthur Lomax-Jones	13	2	7+6	2	0+0	0	0+0	0	0+0	0	0+0	0
	MF	(England) ENG	Sam Coughlan	10	0	2+8	0	0+0	0	0+0	0	0+0	0	0+0	0
	MF	Isle of Man	Dean Pinnington	10	2	4+6	2	0+0	0	0+0	0	0+0	0	0+0	0
	MF	(England) ENG	Max Harrop	8	2	6+2	2	0+0	0	0+0	0	0+0	0	0+0	0
	FW	(England) ENG	Andrew Briggs	39	24	27+10	23	0+0	0	0+1	1	1+0	0	0+0	0
	FW	(England) ENG	Benito Lowe	25	11	12+10	9	1+0	2	1+0	0	0+1	0	0+0	0
	FW	(England) ENG	Connor Comber	42	12	26+13	10	2+0	2	0+1	0	0+0	0	0+0	0
	FW	(England) ENG	Sam Burns	16	6	10+3	6	0+0	0	1+1	0	1+0	0	0+0	0
	FW	(England) ENG	Declan Daniels	16	8	13+3	8	0+0	0	0+0	0	0+0	0	0+0	0
	FW	(England) ENG	Miles Storey	7	0	4+3	0	0+0	0	0+0	0	0+0	0	0+0	0
	FW	(Zimbabwe) ZIM	Alex Cherera	5	1	3+2	1	0+0	0	0+0	0	0+0	0	0+0	0
	FW	(England) ENG	Darius Palma	7	3	4+0	3	0+1	0	1+0	0	0+1	0	0+0	0
	FW	(England) ENG	Lewis Gilboy	28	2	8+15	2	2+0	0	1+1	0	0+0	0	1+0	0
	MF	(England) ENG	Harry Brazel	12	2	8+3	2	1+0	0	0+0	0	0+0	0	0+0	0
	DF	(England) ENG	Daniel Lafferty	15	0	12+1	0	1+1	0	0+0	0	0+0	0	0+0	0
	DF	(England) ENG	Curtis Obeng	3	0	3+0	0	0+0	0	0+0	0	0+0	0	0+0	0
	MF	(England) ENG	Chris Rowney	24	1	17+5	1	0+1	0	1+0	0	0+0	0	0+0	0
	FW	(England) ENG	Sajjad Elhassan	11	3	6+5	3	0+0	0	0+0	0	0+0	0	0+0	0
	MF	(Republic of Ireland) IRL	Abimbola Obasoto	13	1	7+4	1	2+0	0	0+0	0	0+0	0	0+0	0
	DF	(England) ENG	Luis Morrison-Derbyshire	3	0	1+1	0	1+0	0	0+0	0	0+0	0	0+0	0
	MF	(England) ENG	Jack Lenehan	18	1	8+9	1	1+0	0	0+0	0	0+0	0	0+0	0
	DF	(England) ENG	Jack Tinning	9	1	7+1	0	1+0	1	0+0	0	0+0	0	0+0	0
	FW	(England) ENG	Tom Kilifin	6	0	2+4	0	0+0	0	0+0	0	0+0	0	0+0	0
	DF	(France) FRA	Jordi Nsaka	18	0	12+4	0	0+2	0	0+0	0	0+0	0	0+0	0
	MF	(England) ENG	Shakeel Jones-Griffiths	13	2	8+3	2	1+0	0	0+0	0	0+0	0	1+0	0
	DF	(England) ENG	Andrew Hollins	7	0	6+1	0	0+0	0	0+0	0	0+0	0	0+0	0
	DF	(England) ENG	Jimmy Moore	10	1	7+3	1	0+0	0	0+0	0	0+0	0	0+0	0
	GK	(Wales) WAL	Jack Atkinson	17	0	16+0	0	1+0	0	0+0	0	0+0	0	0+0	0
	DF	(England) ENG	Niall Battersby	2	0	0+1	0	1+0	0	0+0	0	0+0	0	0+0	0
	DF	(England) ENG	Matty Williams	10	0	10+0	0	0+0	0	0+0	0	0+0	0	0+0	0
	MF	(Northern Ireland) NIR	Ben McKenna	1	0	0+1	0	0+0	0	0+0	0	0+0	0	0+0	0
	DF	(Australia) AUS	Gabriel Cole	3	0	0+3	0	0+0	0	0+0	0	0+0	0	0+0	0
	FW	(England) ENG	Joe Duckworth	8	3	5+1	3	0+0	0	1+0	0	1+0	0	0+0	0
	FW	(England) ENG	Dan Cockerline	3	0	1+2	0	0+0	0	0+0	0	0+0	0	0+0	0
	FW	(England) ENG	Joe Hobson	13	3	3+8	3	0+0	0	1+0	0	0+0	0	1+0	0
	DF	(England) ENG	Ethan Kachosa	7	0	1+5	0	0+0	0	1+0	0	0+0	0	0+0	0
	DF	(England) ENG	Kyle Hayde	2	0	0+1	0	0+0	0	1+0	0	0+0	0	0+0	0
	MF	(England) ENG	Luis Cantello	5	0	0+4	0	0+0	0	1+0	0	0+0	0	0+0	0
	DF	(England) ENG	Harry Brockbank	5	0	1+3	0	0+0	0	1+0	0	0+0	0	0+0	0
	GK	(England) ENG	Danny Taberner	3	0	2+0	0	1+0	0	0+0	0	0+0	0	0+0	0
	MF	(England) ENG	Sean Higgins	2	1	0+0	0	2+0	1	0+0	0	0+0	0	0+0	0
	MF	(England) ENG	Damola Sotana	1	0	0+1	0	0+0	0	0+0	0	0+0	0	0+0	0
	FW		Joseph Hudson	1	0	0+0	0	0+0	0	0+0	0	0+0	0	1+0	0
	FW	(England) ENG	Mason Beard	1	1	0+0	0	0+0	0	0+0	0	0+0	0	1+0	1
			Cole Turner-Shell	1	0	0+0	0	0+0	0	0+0	0	0+0	0	1+0	0
			Cole Dewhurst	1	0	0+0	0	0+0	0	0+0	0	0+0	0	1+0	0
			Jack Cooper	1	0	0+0	0	0+0	0	0+0	0	0+0	0	0+1	0
			Jack Parker	1	0	0+0	0	0+0	0	0+0	0	0+0	0	0+1	0
			Oliver Holt	1	0	0+0	0	0+0	0	0+0	0	0+0	0	0+1	0
