= Harry Brant =

Harry Brant may refer to:

- Harry Brant (footballer) (Henry Brant, 1905-1979), Scottish footballer, see List of Bury F.C. players (1–24 appearances)
- Harry Brant (1996-2021), son of Stephanie Seymour, see Stephanie Seymour#Personal life

== See also ==
- Henry Brant (disambiguation)
