= Arthur Evans (disambiguation) =

Arthur Evans (1851–1941) was an English archaeologist.

Arthur Evans may also refer to:

== Politicians and activists ==
- Arthur "Slim" Evans (1890–1944), Canadian trade unionist leader in Canada and the USA
- Arthur Evans (physician) (1920–2009), American Quaker war tax resister and peace activist
- Arthur Evans (politician) (1898–1958), British National Liberal and Conservative MP for Cardiff South, 1931–1945

== Sports competitors ==
- Arthur Evans (cricketer) (1871–1950), Australian cricketer
- Arthur Evans (footballer, born 1868) (1868–after 1898), English goalkeeper for Stoke FC during 1890s
- Arthur Evans (footballer, born 1933), English goalkeeper of the 1950s
- Arthur Evans (rower) (born 1947), American Olympic rower
- Arthur Evans (1903–1952), Welsh miner, boxer and rugby union/league footballer nicknamed Candy Evans
- Art Evans (baseball) (1911–1952), American Major League pitcher

== Writers and scholars ==
- Arthur Evans (author) (1942–2011), American gay rights activist; author of Witchcraft and the Gay Counterculture
- Arthur Benoni Evans (1781–1854), English scholarly writer and poet
- Arthur Charles Evans (1916–2011), English author of Sojourn in Silesia: 1940–1945
- A. Grant Evans (1858–1929), American educationalist; second president of University of Oklahoma
- Arthur Humble Evans (1855–1943), English ornithologist
- Arthur V. Evans (born 1956), American zoologist and author
- Arthur Wade-Evans (1875–1964), Welsh clergyman and historian

== Others ==
- Arthur Evans (VC) (1891–1936), British soldier awarded the Victoria Cross
- Arthur Reginald Evans (1905–1989), Australian army officer
- Art Evans (actor) (1942–2024), American actor

== See also ==
- Arthur Evans Moule (1836–1918), English missionary to China
