= Daniel Keough =

Daniel Keough may refer to:

- Danny Keough (footballer) (born 1963), English footballer for Exeter City and Bury, see List of Bury F.C. players (1–24 appearances)
- Danny Keough (born 1964), husband of Lisa Marie Presley
