= Bulcock =

Bulcock is an English surname. Notable people with the surname include:

- Emily Bulcock (1877–1969), Australian poet and journalist
- Frank Bulcock (1892–1973), Australian politician
- Joe Bulcock (1880–1918), English footballer
- Leslie Bulcock (1913–2001), English cricketer
- Philip Bulcock (born 1970), British actor
- Robert Bulcock (1832–1900), Australian politician
