= Henry Brant (disambiguation) =

Henry Brant may refer to:

- Harry Brant (footballer) (Henry Brant, 1905-1979), see List of Bury F.C. players (1–24 appearances)
- Henry Brant (1913-2008), Canadian-born American composer

== See also ==
- Harry Brant
