= Arthur Lomax =

English footballer (born 2004)

Personal information
- Full name: Arthur Lomax-Jones
- Date of birth: 17 May 2004 (age 22)
- Position: Midfielder

Team information
- Current team: Altona East Phoenix
- Number: 17

Youth career
- Tranmere Rovers
- 2018–2022: Wigan Athletic

Senior career*
Years	Team	Apps	(Gls)
2022–2024	Tranmere Rovers	0	(0)
2023	→ Bootle (loan)		
2023–2024	→ Widnes (loan)		
2024	Bury		
2024–2025	→ City of Liverpool (loan)		
2025–	Altona East Phoenix	20	(4)
- * Club domestic league appearances and goals as of 1:12, 8 March 2026 (UTC)

Arthur Lomax (born 17 May 2004) is an English professional footballer who plays as a midfielder for Victorian State League Division 1 North-West side Altona East Phoenix.

== Career ==
=== Wigan Athletic ===
Lomax joined Wigan Athletic from Tranmere Rovers at under-14 level. He scored four goals in the U15 Premier League Floodlit Cup final against Sunderland at the DW Stadium in April 2019. He helped the under-18 team to win the Professional Development League North title and become National champions. However he left the club in April 2022 following the expiry of his two-year scholarship.

=== Tranmere Rovers ===
On 30 May 2022, Lomax returned to Tranmere Rovers to sign his first professional contract. He made his first-team debut on 20 September, after coming on as a half-time substitute for Kieron Morris in a 2–2 draw with Bolton Wanderers in an EFL Trophy match at Prenton Park. He earned his first start in the competition on 18 October, in a 1–0 victory at Crewe Alexandra. On 9 May 2023 the club announced he would be released.

=== Altona East Phoenix ===
In February 2025, Lomax moved to Australia to join Victorian State League Division 2 North-West side Altona East Phoenix.

The club won promotion in Lomax's first season, with the midfielder contributing four goals in 20 games.

== Career statistics ==
As of match played 18 October 2022

Appearances and goals by club, season and competition
Club	Season	League			FA Cup		EFL Cup		Other		Total	
Club	Season	Division	Apps	Goals	Apps	Goals	Apps	Goals	Apps	Goals	Apps	Goals
Tranmere Rovers	2022–23	EFL League Two	0	0	0	0	0	0	3 (Note: Includes appearance/s in the EFL Trophy)	0	3	0
Career total			0	0	0	0	0	0	3	0	3	0
