= Regan Walker =

English footballer

Personal information
- Full name: Regan Craig Walker
- Date of birth: 4 June 1996 (age 30)
- Place of birth: Manchester, England
- Position: Forward

Youth career
- Manchester City
- Bury

Senior career*
Years	Team	Apps	(Gls)
2013–2014	Bury	3	(0)
2014	→ Hyde (loan)	6	(0)
2014–2015	Hyde	6	(0)
- * Club domestic league appearances and goals

Regan Craig Walker (born 4 June 1996) is an English former footballer who played for Bury.

== Career ==
Born in Manchester, Walker began his career with Bury having previously been at Manchester City's academy. He made his Football League debut on 2 November 2013 in a 3–1 defeat against Torquay United.

On 27 March 2014, he joined Conference Premier club Hyde on loan until the end of the season.

After leaving Bury at the end of the season he discovered a tumour on his leg and was diagnosed with Ewing's sarcoma, a rare form of cancer that forced him to retire from football.
