= Ted Rodgerson =

English footballer (1891–1962)

Personal information
- Full name: Edward Rodgerson
- Date of birth: 3 April 1891
- Place of birth: Sunderland, England
- Date of death: 8 January 1962 (aged 70)
- Place of death: Sunderland, England
- Height: 5 ft 8 in (1.73 m)
- Position: Inside forward

Senior career*
Years	Team	Apps	(Gls)
19??–1913	Boldon Colliery Welfare		
1913	Huddersfield Town	0	(0)
1913–1914	Castleford Town		
1914–1919	Southend United		
1919–1920	Bury	13	(3)
1920–1922	Brighton & Hove Albion	53	(11)
1922–1923	Clapton Orient	0	(0)
1924	Torquay United		
1924–1925	Taunton United		
- Southwick (Durham)
- Murton Colliery Welfare
- * Club domestic league appearances and goals

Edward Rodgerson (3 April 1891 – 8 January 1962) was an English professional footballer who played as an inside forward in the Football League for Bury and Brighton & Hove Albion He was also on the books of Huddersfield Town and Clapton Orient without playing for either in the league, and played non-league football for a variety of clubs.

== Life and career ==
Rodgerson was born in Sunderland in 1891, the son of Ralph Rodgerson, a ropemaker, and his wife Mary. The 1911 Census finds the family living at Boldon Colliery where Rodgerson worked as a putter.

He played football for Boldon Colliery Welfare, and in 1913, described in the Athletic News as "a forward of the fast, pushful order, with a dangerous rush near goal", joined Football League Second Division club Huddersfield Town. He did not break through to the first team, and by October was playing for Castleford Town of the Midland League. At the end of the season he joined Southern League club Southend United.

He made his Football League debut after the war with Bury in the Second Division, and scored three goals from 13 Second Division matches, including the winner against Wolverhampton Wanderers and the opening goal in a 2–1 win against South Shields.

Rodgerson moved on to Brighton & Hove Albion ahead of their first season in the newly formed Third Division of the Football League. He played in their opening fixture, and remained a regular selection until an injury sustained in an FA Cup tie in January 1922 finished his professional career. An attempted Football League comeback with Clapton Orient came to nothing, but he played Southern League football for Torquay United and Taunton United before returning to his native north-east of England where he played non-league football for teams including Southwick and Murton Colliery Welfare.

The 1939 Register finds Rodgerson living with his wife, Amy, in Moreland Street, Sunderland, and working as a gravedigger. He was still resident at the same address when he died in 1962 at the age of 70.
