= Keil O'Brien =

English footballer (born 1992)

Personal information
- Full name: Keil Aaron O'Brien
- Date of birth: 29 June 1992 (age 34)
- Place of birth: Stockport, England
- Height: 6 ft 5 in (1.96 m)
- Position: Centre back

Team information
- Current team: Trafford

Youth career
- Manchester United

Senior career*
Years	Team	Apps	(Gls)
2009–2010	Glossop North End	3	(0)
2010–2011	Northwich Victoria		
2011	→ Radcliffe Borough (loan)		
2011–2012	Mossley	60	(1)
2012–2014	Chorley	59	(3)
2014–2016	Bury	0	(0)
2015–2016	→ FC Halifax Town (loan)	4	(0)
2016–2017	Southport	4	(0)
2016	→ FC Halifax Town (loan)	1	(0)
2016–2017	→ Stalybridge Celtic (loan)	7	(0)
2017	Moreland City FC		
2017–	Trafford		
2020	→ Mossley (loan)		
- * Club domestic league appearances and goals as of 07:28, 30 August 2016 (UTC)

Keil Aaron O'Brien (born 29 June 1992) is an English footballer who plays for Trafford as a central defender.

== Club career ==
A Manchester United youth graduate, O'Brien made his senior debuts with Glossop North End in 2009. He joined Northwich Victoria in the 2010 summer, but was deemed surplus to requirements in January 2011.

O'Brien was loaned to Radcliffe Borough in February 2011. After appearing regularly he moved to Mossley in August 2011; he made 60 appearances for the club before joining Chorley in December 2012, for an undisclosed fee.

O'Brien only won recognition in the 2013–14 season, where he appeared in 40 matches and scored two goals, as his side was promoted to the Football Conference as champions. He was also named in the campaign's Team of the Year.

On 19 June 2014 O'Brien signed a two-year deal with League Two side Bury. However, he suffered a knee injury in September, being sidelined for a few months.

O'Brien made his professional debut on 16 December 2014, starting in a 0–1 away loss against Luton Town in the FA Cup. On 21 October of the following year he was loaned to FC Halifax Town, until 9 January.

He joined Southport in August 2016. In the same month, O'Brien returned to Halifax on a month's loan.

At the end of September 2016 he joined Stalybridge Celtic on loan.

In January 2017 O'Brien moved to Australia to sign for Moreland City FC, a team competing in the National Premier Leagues Victoria 2. On his return to England he signed for Trafford.

In January 2020 he rejoined former club Mossley on loan.
