= Viv Aston =

English footballer

Personal information
- Full name: Walter Vivian Aston
- Date of birth: 16 October 1918
- Place of birth: Coseley, England
- Date of death: March 1999 (aged 80)
- Position: Defender

Senior career*
Years	Team	Apps	(Gls)
1936	Bournemouth & Boscombe Athletic	0	(0)
1938–1947	Bury	23	(0)
1948–1951	Oldham Athletic	30	(1)
1951	Chester City	0	(0)
Total		53	(1)
- * Club domestic league appearances and goals

Walter Vivian Aston (16 October 1918 – March 1999) was a footballer who played in The Football League for Bury and Oldham Athletic. He also played for Bournemouth & Boscombe Athletic and Chester City.
