= Richard Rushton =

English footballer

Personal information
- Full name: Richard Rushton
- Date of birth: 18 September 1902
- Place of birth: Willenhall, Staffordshire, England
- Date of death: 1981 (aged 78–79)
- Height: 5 ft 10 1/2 in (1.79 m)
- Positions: Wing half; centre half

Senior career*
Years	Team	Apps	(Gls)
–	Bloxwich Strollers		
–	Willenhall Swifts		
1924–1925	Lincoln City	44	(1)
1925–1926	Sheffield Wednesday	0	(0)
1926–1927	Barnsley	6	(0)
–	Wombwell		
192?–1929	Connah's Quay & Shotton		
1929–1930	Bury	5	(0)
1930–1931	Swindon Town	7	(0)
–	Wellington Town		
- * Club domestic league appearances and goals

Richard Rushton (18 September 1902 – 1981) was an English footballer who made 62 appearances in the Football League playing for Lincoln City, Barnsley, Bury and Swindon Town. He played as a wing half or centre half.

Rushton began his career playing non-league football for Bloxwich Strollers and Willenhall Swifts in his native Staffordshire before joining Lincoln City. After a little more than a season, he joined Sheffield Wednesday, but never represented them in senior competition. He then spent a short spell with Barnsley and returned to non-league with Wombwell and Connah's Quay & Shotton, with whom he won the 1928–29 Welsh Cup, defeating Cardiff City 3–0 in the final. A return to the Football League with Bury and Swindon Town preceded the end of his career back in non-league with Wellington Town.
