= Anton Smith =

English footballer

Personal information
- Date of birth: 9 November 1985 (age 40)
- Place of birth: Hackney, England
- Position: Striker

Youth career
- Interwood
- 2000–2005: Crystal Palace

Senior career*
Years	Team	Apps	(Gls)
2005	TP-47	6	(0)
2006	Wealdstone		
- Erith & Belvedere
- * Club domestic league appearances and goals

Anton Smith (born 9 November 1985) is an English former footballer who played as a striker.

== Club career ==
In 2000, at the age of 14, Smith joined the academy at Crystal Palace from local club Interwood. In April 2005, Smith signed for Finnish club TP-47. During his time in Finland, Smith made six appearances for TP-47, all coming in the Veikkausliiga. Following his spell in Finland, Smith returned to England, signing for Wealdstone. In 2006, Smith joined Erith & Belvedere.

== Coaching career ==
Following his playing career, Smith moved into coaching and scouting. Smith has scouted for Braintree Town, Leatherhead, and Reading. In 2017, Smith was named as head coach, under Qayum Shakoor, at Waltham Forest. In 2018, Smith followed Shakoor to Crawley Town under-23s.
