= Steve Kenworthy =

Welsh footballer

Personal information
- Full name: Stephen Kenworthy
- Date of birth: 6 November 1959
- Place of birth: Wrexham, Wales
- Date of death: 26 June 2001 (aged 41)
- Place of death: Wrexham, Wales
- Position: Left-back

Youth career
- Wrexham

Senior career*
| Years | Team | Apps | (Gls) |
| 1977–1981 | Wrexham | 20 | (1) |
| 1981–1983 | Bury | 14 | (0) |
- Bangor City
- * Club domestic league appearances and goals

Stephen Kenworthy (6 November 1959 – 26 June 2001) was a Welsh professional footballer who played as a left-back. He made appearances in the English Football League for Wrexham and Bury. He also played for Welsh league club Bangor City.
