= Bill Hurst (footballer) =

English footballer

Personal information
- Full name: William Robert Hurst
- Date of birth: 4 March 1921
- Place of birth: Brierfield, England
- Date of death: September 2005 (age 84)
- Place of death: England
- Position: Winger

Senior career*
Years	Team	Apps	(Gls)
1938–1939	Burnley	0	(0)
1939–1946	Plymouth Argyle	4	(0)
1946–1947	Nelson	?	(?)
1947–1948	Bury	1	(0)
1948	Northwich Victoria	?	(?)
1948–1949	Accrington Stanley	1	(0)
- * Club domestic league appearances and goals

William Robert Hurst (4 March 1921 – December 2005) was an English professional footballer who played as a winger.
