= Sam Hulmes =

English footballer

Personal information
- Full name: Samuel Hulmes
- Date of birth: 1879
- Place of birth: Ashton-under-Lyne, England
- Date of death: 1920 (aged 40–41)
- Position: Full back

Senior career*
Years	Team	Apps	(Gls)
1898–1899	Heywood United		
1899–1900	Lincoln City	2	(0)
1900–1901	New Brompton		
1901–1903	Rochdale Town		
1903–1904	Rossendale United	43	(2)
1904–1905	Nelson		
1905–1906	Bury	15	(0)
1907	Nelson		
Total		17	(0)
- * Club domestic league appearances and goals

Samuel Hulmes (1879–1920) was an English footballer who played in the Football League for Bury and Lincoln City.
