= Harry Fare =

English footballer

Personal information
- Full name: Harold Vautin Fare
- Date of birth: 1 May 1896
- Place of birth: Wallasey, England
- Date of death: 12 August 1963 (aged 67)
- Place of death: Wallasey, England
- Height: 5 ft 11 in (1.80 m)
- Position: Full-back

Youth career
- Harrowby

Senior career*
Years	Team	Apps	(Gls)
1920–1922	Everton	0	(0)
1922–1925	Wigan Borough	112	(12)
1925–1927	Bury	2	(0)
- Flint Town United
- Stalybridge Celtic
- * Club domestic league appearances and goals

Harold Vautin Fare (1 May 1896 – 12 August 1963) was an English footballer who played in the Football League for Wigan Borough and Bury. Born in Wallasey, Fare started his career at Everton before joining Wigan in May 1922. He was a near ever-present during his three seasons at Wigan, making 112 league appearances, and was the club's regular penalty taker, with nine of his 12 goals being converted from the spot. He left the club in May 1925 and joined Bury, but only made two more appearances in the league before dropping into non-league football in 1927.
