= Arthur Evans (physician) =

American Quaker activist and physician (1920–2009)

Arthur Evans (21 February 1920 – 10 March 2009) was a Quaker physician and a devotee of Prem Rawat who was imprisoned for refusing to cooperate with the United States government's attempts to tax him to pay for war expenses.

Each year, starting in the early 1940s, Evans would refuse to pay some or all of his federal income tax, donating that money (or sometimes double that amount) instead to charity. The Internal Revenue Service would typically then also seize the amount from Evans's bank account so that he would end up losing the money twice. “But that’s all right,” he told a reporter. “My action merely is a protest — I’m motivated to act morally myself. I won’t pay the tax for war voluntarily. This way the responsibility for committing the immoral act is on the government.”

In 1963, Evans was jailed for 90 days for contempt of court when he refused to turn over his financial records to the Internal Revenue Service.

Evans was also active with the American Friends Service Committee and the Fellowship of Reconciliation.
