= Archie Nicol =

Scottish footballer (1865–1941)

Personal information
- Full name: Archibald Nicol
- Date of birth: 1865
- Place of birth: Dunfermline, Scotland
- Date of death: 1941 (aged 75–76)
- Position: Wing half

Senior career*
Years	Team	Apps	(Gls)
1895–1896	Cowdenbeath		
1896–1897	Lochgelly United		
1897–1900	Bury	18	(0)
1900–1901	Lochgelly United		
1901	Dunfermline Athletic		
Total		18	(0)
- * Club domestic league appearances and goals

Archibald Nicol (1865–1941) was a Scottish footballer who played in the English Football League for Bury.
