= Albert Spilsbury =

English footballer

Personal information
- Full name: Albert William Joseph Spilsbury
- Date of birth: 1894
- Place of birth: Ledbury, England
- Date of death: 1959 (aged 64–65)
- Position: Goalkeeper

Senior career*
Years	Team	Apps	(Gls)
1919–1920	Newcastle United	0	(0)
1920	Bury	3	(0)
- * Club domestic league appearances and goals

Albert William Joseph Spilsbury (1894–1959) was an English professional footballer who played as a goalkeeper in the Football League for Bury.

== Personal life ==
Spilsbury served as a sergeant in the Worcestershire Regiment during the First World War.
