= Max Harrop =

English footballer

Personal information
- Date of birth: 30 June 1993 (age 33)
- Place of birth: Oldham, England
- Height: 1.73 m (5 ft 8 in)
- Position: Midfielder

Team information
- Current team: Witton Albion

Youth career
- Liverpool
- 2009–2011: Bury

Senior career*
Years	Team	Apps	(Gls)
2009–2013	Bury	8	(0)
2011–2012	→ Blyth Spartans (loan)	5	(1)
2012–2013	→ Hinckley United (loan)	12	(0)
2013	→ Tamworth (loan)	2	(0)
2013–2015	Nantwich Town	43	(7)
2015	Ashton United	5	(1)
2015	Ramsbottom United	9	(1)
2016–2017	Nantwich Town	1	(1)
2017–2020	Altrincham	83	(11)
2020	Curzon Ashton	6	(0)
2022	Ashton United	13	(1)
2023	Stalybridge Celtic	14	(4)
2023–2024	Avro	10	(0)
2024	Bury	6	(2)
2024	Avro	12	(2)
2024–	Witton Albion	15	(2)
- * Club domestic league appearances and goals as of 16:32, 3 July 2025 (UTC)

Max Harrop (born 30 June 1993) is an English football winger who plays for Witton Albion. He previously played for Bury in the Football League.

== Playing career ==
Harrop spent his youth at the Liverpool Academy, but transferred to the Bury youth team as a teenager. He was awarded the 'Promising Newcomer of the Season' award at the club for his progress in 2009–10. He made his first team debut on 26 March 2011, replacing Kyle Bennett 79 minutes into a goalless draw with Port Vale at Vale Park.

He signed a new two-year contract with Bury in June 2011.

In December 2011 it was announced that Max had signed on a months loan with Conference North side Blyth Spartans. He returned to Bury during February having been recalled by the parent club.

In October 2012 Harrop was sent out on loan again, this time to Conference North club Hinckley United, scoring on his debut.

=== Nantwich Town ===
On his release from Bury he joined Nantwich Town in the summer of 2013. He made his debut for The Dabbers against King's Lynn Town on 17 August 2013. Harrop scored his first goal against Stocksbridge Park Steels on 7 September 2013.

=== Ashton United ===
On 14 March 2015, he signed for Ashton United. He scored his first goal against Rushall Olympic on 25 April 2015

=== Ramsbottom United ===
In August, 2015, he left Ashton United for Ramsbottom United, joining his older brother Kyle Harrop. Max scored his first goal against Whitby Town on 26 August 2015.

=== Nantwich Town ===
Harrop signed with Nantwich Town on 24 March, and marked his return by scoring the winning goal, coming off the bench against Barwell on 26 March.

=== Altrincham ===
On 11 August 2017, Harrop signed for Altrincham, on the eve of their first game of the season. In his first season with Altrincham, the club were champions of the Northern Premier League. He then secured promotion to the National league before departing.

=== Curzon Ashton ===
On 27 August 2020, Harrop signed for Curzon Ashton.

=== Return to Ashton and transfer to Stalybridge ===
In the summer of 2022, Harrop re-signed for Ashton United. On 7 June 2023, he transferred to Stalybridge Celtic.

On 29 November 2023, he signed for newly-promoted Northern Premier League West Division side Avro, with Manager, Chris Frost, describing that Harrop would "add a level of technical ability that this club has never seen before". He only made ten appearances for the club before re-joining his boyhood club, Bury, of the North West Counties Football League Premier Division title run-in on 19 March 2024. He made six appearances, scoring twice against AFC Liverpool as Bury slipped from the top of the table in the last two games to finish in 3rd position. He made a further two appearances in the play-offs as Bury lost to Wythenshawe Town in the final.

== Career statistics ==
As of match played 3 May 2025

Appearances and goals by club, season and competition
Club	Season	League			FA Cup		League Cup		Other		Total	
Club	Season	Division	Apps	Goals	Apps	Goals	Apps	Goals	Apps	Goals	Apps	Goals
Bury	2009–10	League Two	0	0	0	0	0	0	0	0	0	0
Bury	2010–11	League Two	3	0	0	0	0	0	0	0	3	0
Bury	2011–12	League One	5	0	0	0	1	0	1 (Note: Appearances in Football League Trophy)	0	7	0
Bury	2012–13	League One	0	0	0	0	0	0	0	0	0	0
Bury	Total		8	0	0	0	1	0	1	0	10	0
Altrincham	2017–18	NPL Premier Division	28	4	2	0	—		9 (Note: Five appearances in FA Trophy, three in Cheshire Senior Cup, one appearance and one goal in Northern Premier League Challenge Cup)	1	39	5
Altrincham	2018–19	National League North	35	7	3	0	—		3 (Note: One appearance in FA Trophy, two in National League North play-offs)	0	41	7
Altrincham	2019–20	National League North	20	0	2	0	—		5 (Note: Three appearances in FA Trophy, one in Cheshire Senior Cup, one in National League North play-offs)	0	27	0
Altrincham	Total		83	11	7	0	—		17	1	107	12
Ashton United	2022–23	NPL Premier Division	13	1	1	0	—		2 (Note: One appearance in FA Trophy, one in Manchester Premier Cup)	0	16	1
Stalybridge Celtic	2023–24	NPL Division One West	14	4	1	0	—		3 (Note: Two appearances in FA Trophy, one in Cheshire Senior Cup)	0	18	4
Avro	2023–24	NPL Division One West	10	0	—		—		1 (Note: Appearances in Manchester Premier Cup)	0	11	0
Bury	2023–24	NWCFL Premier Division	6	2	—		—		2 (Note: Appearances in North West Counties Football League Premier Division play-offs)	0	8	2
Avro	2024–25	NPL Division One West	12	2	0	0	—		1 (Note: Appearances in FA Trophy)	0	13	2
Witton Albion	2024–25	NPL Division One West	15	2	—		—		—		15	2
Career total			161	22	9	0	1	0	27	1	198	23
