= Chris Rowney =

English footballer

Personal information
- Date of birth: 4 February 1991 (age 35)
- Place of birth: Manchester, England
- Position: Midfielder

Team information
- Current team: Bury

Youth career
- ?–2009: Oldham Athletic

Senior career*
Years	Team	Apps	(Gls)
2009–2010	Oldham Athletic	1	(0)
2010–2011	Mossley	45	(8)
2011–2012	Woodley Sports	?	(?)
2012–2013	Mossley	?	(?)
2013–2019	Curzon Ashton	?	(?)
2019–2021	Ashton United	42	(1)
2021–	Bury F.C.	22	(0)
- * Club domestic league appearances and goals as of 22:32, 3 May 2022 (UTC)

Chris Rowney (born 4 February 1991) is an English professional footballer who plays as a midfielder.

== Career ==
Rowney made his debut on 1 September 2009 for Oldham Athletic in their 2–1 home defeat to Accrington Stanley in the Football League Trophy, replacing Andy Holdsworth in the 62nd minute as a substitute.

He was one of six players released by Oldham at the end of his contract in June 2010. Rowney then went on to sign for Mossley later that same month. Mossley manager, Shaun Higgins commented on Rowney after he signed stating; "Chris is a very talented young player. Several offers came his way but he has chosen a different path for now and we are delighted that he has agreed to sign for us."

After a season with Mossley, Rowney moved to Woodley Sports in August 2011 but returned to Mossley in August 2012.

In 2013, he joined Curzon Ashton.
