= Julius Gregory (footballer) =

English footballer

Personal information
- Full name: Julius Gregory
- Date of birth: 4 July 1881
- Place of birth: Romiley, England
- Date of death: 20 July 1916 (aged 35)
- Place of death: High Wood, France
- Position: Full back

Senior career*
Years	Team	Apps	(Gls)
1899–1902	Bury	0	(0)
1902–1903	Unsworth		
1903–1905	Bury	14	(0)
1905–1906	Manchester City	3	(0)
1906–1908	Brighton & Hove Albion	64	(1)
1908–1909	Luton Town	28	(0)
- * Club domestic league appearances and goals

Julius Gregory (4 July 1881 – 20 July 1916) was an English professional footballer who played in the Football League for Bury and Manchester City as a full back.

== Personal life ==
Gregory attended Manchester Grammar School. In late 1914, a matter of months after the outbreak of the First World War, he enlisted in as a private in the 20th (Service) Battalion, Royal Fusiliers. Gregory was killed during an attack on High Wood during the Battle of the Somme on 20 July 1916 and was commemorated on the Thiepval Memorial.

== Career statistics ==
Appearances and goals by club, season and competition
Club	Season	League			FA Cup		Total	
Club	Season	Division	Apps	Goals	Apps	Goals	Apps	Goals
Bury	1903–04	First Division	7	0	0	0	7	0
Bury	1904–05	First Division	7	0	0	0	7	0
Bury	Total		14	0	0	0	14	0
Manchester City	1905–06	First Division	3	0	0	0	3	0
Brighton & Hove Albion	1906–07	Southern League First Division	36	1	0	0	36	1
Brighton & Hove Albion	1907–08	Southern League First Division	28	0	0	0	28	0
Brighton & Hove Albion	Total		64	1	0	0	64	1
Luton Town	1908–09	Southern League First Division	28	0	3	0	31	0
Career total			109	1	3	0	112	1
