= Joe Bulcock =

English footballer

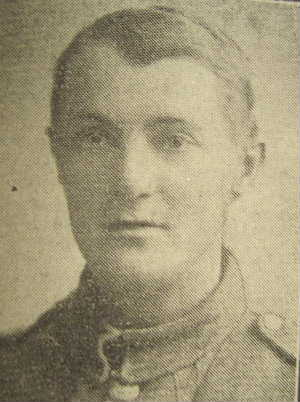

Personal information
- Full name: Joseph Bulcock
- Date of birth: April 1879
- Place of birth: Burnley, England
- Date of death: 20 April 1918 (aged 39)
- Place of death: Watten, France
- Position: Right back

Youth career
- St Catherine's

Senior career*
Years	Team	Apps	(Gls)
- Brynn Central
- Burnley
- Aston Villa
1904	Bacup		
1905	Colne		
1906–1907	Bury	5	(0)
	Macclesfield	0	(0)
1908–1909	Exeter City	23	
1909–1914	Crystal Palace	146	(2)
1914–1915	Swansea Town		

International career
1910	Southern League XI	1	(0)
1910	Football Association XI		
- * Club domestic league appearances and goals

Joseph Bulcock (April 1879 – 20 April 1918) was an English professional footballer, best remembered for his five years as a right back in the Southern League with Crystal Palace, for whom he made over 140 appearances. Earlier in his career, he played in the Football League for Bury and for a number of non-League clubs. He represented the Southern League XI and the Football Association XI.

== Personal life ==
Bulcock was the youngest of three brothers. After professional football was suspended at the end of the 1914–15 season due to the ongoing First World War, he lived in Llanelli and worked as a plumber's mate. Bulcock enlisted as a private in the Welch Regiment in December 1915 and was sent to the Western Front in September 1917. He was wounded at the Fourth Battle of Ypres and died of wounds to the head at 36th Casualty Clearing Station in Watten, France on 20 April 1918. Bulcock was buried in Haringhe (Bandaghem) Military Cemetery, Belgium.

== Honours ==
Colne

- Lancashire Junior Cup: 1905–06
