= Kyle Hayde =

English footballer

Personal information
- Full name: Kyle William Hayde
- Date of birth: 25 September 2001 (age 25)
- Place of birth: England
- Position: Defender

Senior career*
Years	Team	Apps	(Gls)
2020–2022	Tranmere Rovers	0	(0)
2021	→ Marine (loan)	10	(1)
2022	→ Marine (loan)	6	(0)
2022-2023	Warrington Rylands	?	(?)
2023	Marine	16	(0)
- * Club domestic league appearances and goals as of 13:01, 20 December 2023 (UTC)

Kyle William Hayde (born 25 September 2001) is an English professional footballer who plays as a defender, most recently for Marine.

== Career ==
He made his Tranmere Rovers first team debut in a 2–1 defeat to Leicester City Under-21's in the 2019–20 EFL Trophy, and signed his first professional contract in July 2020. The following season he made two appearances for the club in the 2020–21 EFL Trophy competition.

In September 2021 he joined Marine on loan for a month with the deal later extended until January 2022. He was recalled by Tranmere from this loan spell in December and went on to make his fourth appearance for the Tranmere in a 2021–22 EFL Trophy match. In February 2022 he returned to Marine on loan for the rest of the season but was recalled in April.

In July 2022, Hayde joined Warrington Rylands for an undisclosed fee.

He rejoined Marine on a permanent basis in February 2023 and played in the 2023 Liverpool Senior Cup final against Runcorn Linnets, which Marine won on penalties. He left Marine by mutual consent in December 2023.

== Career statistics ==
As of match played 21 December 2021

Appearances and goals by club, season and competition
Club	Season	League			FA Cup		League Cup		Other		Total	
Club	Season	Division	Apps	Goals	Apps	Goals	Apps	Goals	Apps	Goals	Apps	Goals
Tranmere Rovers	2019–20	League One	0	0	0	0	0	0	1 (Note: Appearance(s) in the Football League Trophy)	0	1	0
Tranmere Rovers	2020–21	League Two	0	0	0	0	0	0	2	0	2	0
Tranmere Rovers	2021–22	League Two	0	0	0	0	0	0	1	0	1	0
Tranmere Rovers	Tranmere Rovers total		0	0	0	0	0	0	4	0	4	0
Career total			0	0	0	0	0	0	4	0	4	0
