= Arthur Evans (footballer, born 1933) =

English footballer

Arthur Evans (born 13 May 1933) is an English former professional footballer of the 1950s. He played professionally for Bury, Stockport County and Gillingham and made a total of 16 appearances in the Football League.
